= Jean-Karl Vernay =

French racing driver

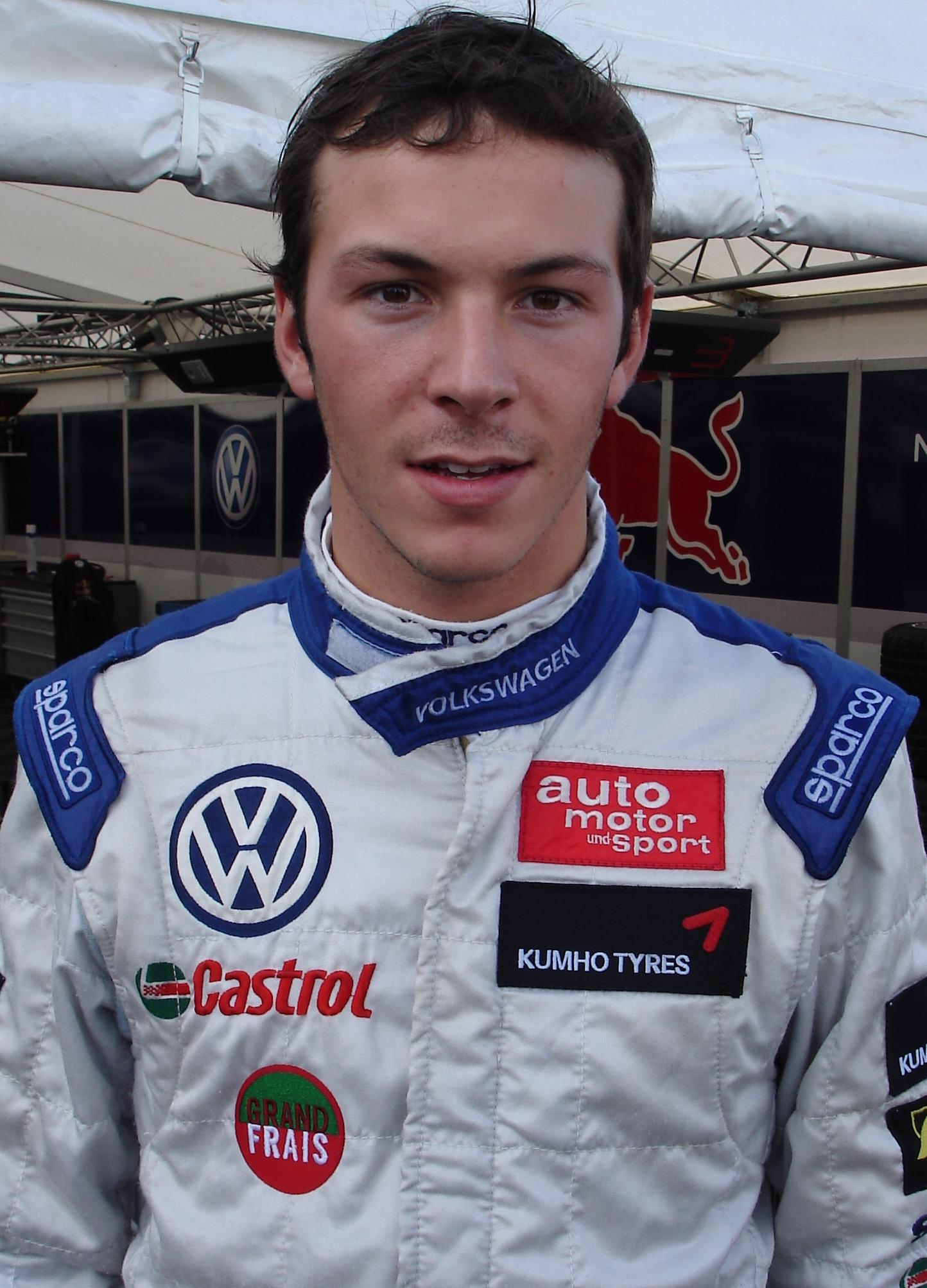
- Vernay in 2009
- Nationality: (France) French
- Born: 31 October 1987 (age 39) Villeurbanne (France)

Super GT (GT500)
- Categorisation: FIA Platinum
- Years active: 2014
- Teams: Dome Racing
- Car number: 18

Previous series
- 2013 2012 2011 2010 2007-2009 2006-07 2006 2005: FIA WEC (LMGTE Am); Porsche Carrera Cup France; Formula Renault 3.5; Indy Lights; F3 Euroseries; A1 Grand Prix; French Formula Renault 2.0; Formula Campus France

Championship titles
- 2020 2018 2017 2012 2010 2005: WTCR Trophy; TCR Benelux Series; TCR International Series; Porsche Carrera Cup France; Indy Lights; Formula Campus France

Awards
- 2010: Indy Lights Rookie of the Year

Jean-Karl "J. K." Vernay (born 31 October 1987) is a French professional racing driver. He was 2010 Indy Lights and 2017 TCR International Series champion. He has won races at the World Touring Car Cup, where he finished fifth in 2018 and won the WTCR Trophy in 2020.

== Career history ==
=== Karting ===
- 2000: third in France Cadet Championship
- 2001: fifth in Speedy Junior World Cup at the Masters Karting Paris Bercy
- 2002: second in Junior Monaco Kart Cup
- 2004: second in Belgium Championship, Formula A and 21st in world championship, Formula A

=== Formula ===
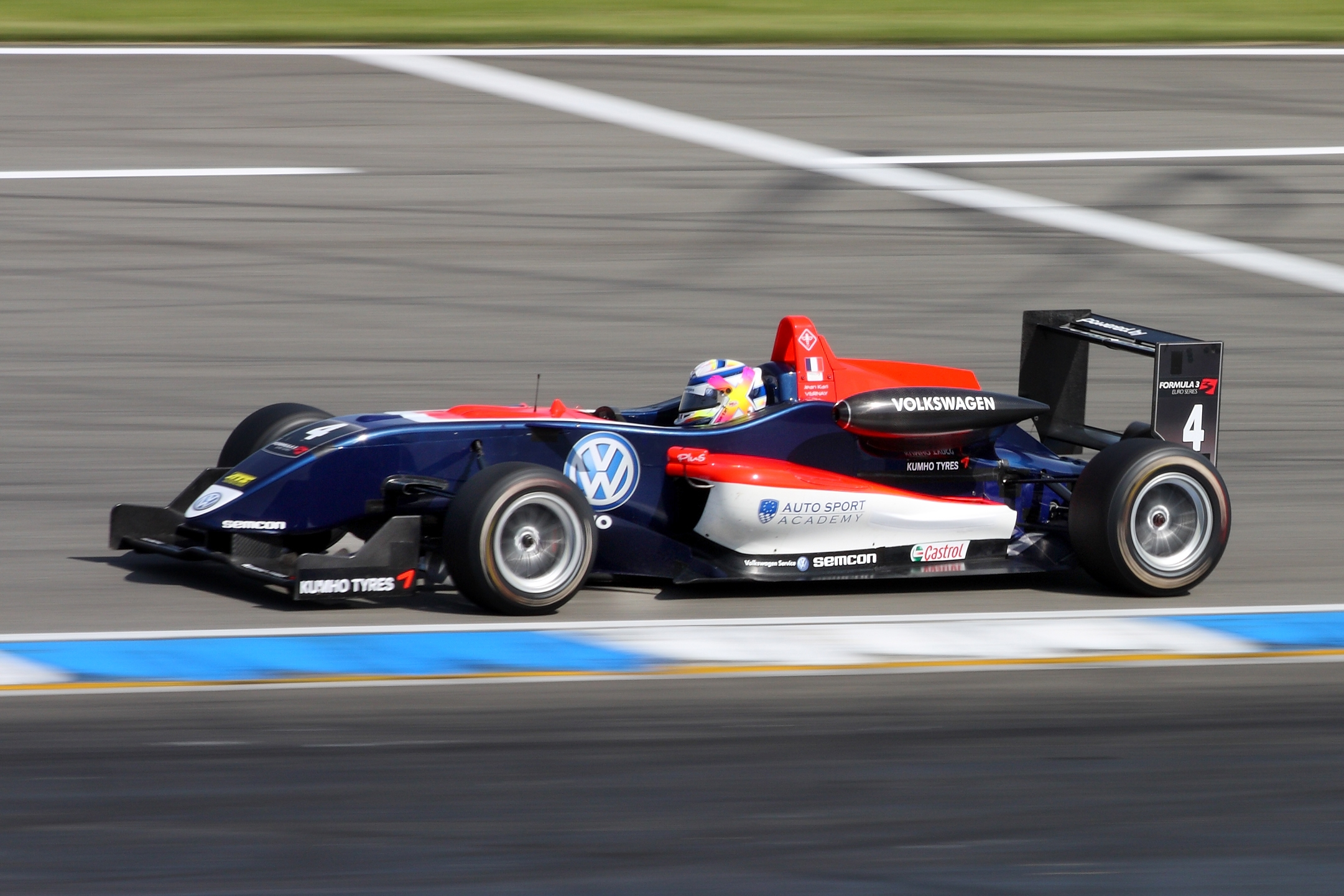
Vernay during the opening round of the 2009 Formula Three Euroseries season at Hockenheim.

In 2005, Villeurbanne-born Vernay drove in the French Formula Campus series and finished first with six wins and twelve podiums on fourteen races. The following year, he finished runner-up and best rookies in the French Formula Renault Championship with seven podiums.

Vernay drove two rounds as race driver in the 2006-07 A1 Grand Prix season and the last round as practice session driver.

In 2007, Vernay was selected to be part of the Red Bull Junior Team program that offers funding and support for promising young drivers. With Tom Dillmann, they were the first French drivers to take part in the programme. Vernay is still a part of the team, along with fellow Frenchman Jean-Éric Vergne.

The same year, Vernay raced in the Formula Three Euroseries with Signature-Plus team finishing tenth. A second place was his best result, with another finish of hird in the non-championship Ultimate Masters of Formula 3 at Zolder behind Nico Hülkenberg and team-mate Yann Clairay.

Vernay continued in the series in 2008, continuing with Signature-Plus. He ended up eighth in the championship, with three podiums coming at the Norisring, Brands Hatch and Le Mans. He also started his Brands Hatch podium race from pole position, thanks to the series' reverse grid system.

Vernay competed in a third season in 2009 for Signature, with team-mates Mika Mäki and Tiago Geronimi. Vernay finally took his first win in the Euroseries, at the 42nd attempt, winning the sprint race at Hockenheim. He added a second win in the final race of the season, again at Hockenheim, passing Christopher Zanella on the final lap. At the season-ending Macau Grand Prix, Vernay set an outright lap record en route to a victory in the qualifying race, giving him pole position for the main event. However, he lost out to Edoardo Mortara in the main race, after fluffing a gear shift.

Vernay has moved to the United States to race in the Firestone Indy Lights series in 2010 for Sam Schmidt Motorsports. He won in his series debut on the Streets of St. Petersburg in a wet race. He followed this up with another win at Barber Motorsports Park and a third-place finish at Long Beach, leaving him 28 points clear at the top of the standings after three rounds. Vernay went on to win four races that season and clinched the championship over James Hinchcliffe with one race to go, having to just start the final round.

Vernay is the first Indy Lights champion since 1996's David Empringham to not go on to compete in IndyCar.

== Sports cars and touring cars ==
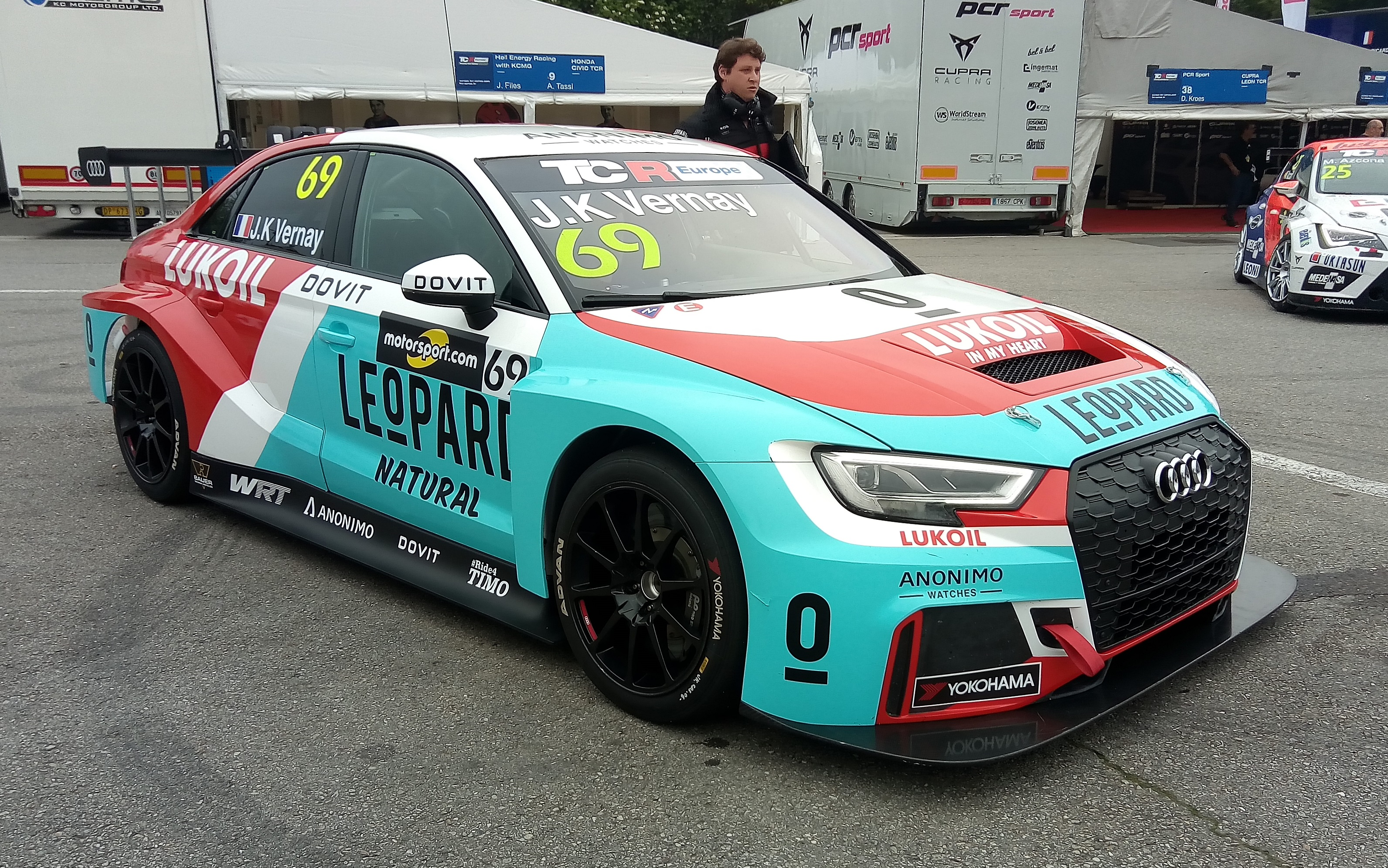
Vernay's Audi RS3 LMS car for TCR competition in 2018.

In 2011, Vernay was the test and reserve driver for Peugeot Sport, testing the Peugeot 908 on several occasions.

In 2012, Vernay won the Porsche Carrera Cup France driving for Sébastien Loeb Racing. Vernay won the 24 Hours of Le Mans LMGTE Am class in 2013 while competing for IMSA Performance Matmut, driving a Porsche 997 GT3-RSR. He also contested in the full 2013 FIA World Endurance Championship season. In 2014, Vernay will drive for Weider Modulo Dome Racing in Super GT GT500 class.

In 2016, Vernay would drive a W Racing Team Volkswagen Golf at the TCR International Series.

== Racing record ==
=== Career summary ===
Season	Series	Team	Races	Wins	Poles	F/Laps	Podiums	Points	Position
2005	Formula Campus France	La Filière	14	6	2	3	12	219	**1st**
2006	French Formula Renault 2.0	SG Formula	13	2	3	7	7	108	**2nd**
2006	Eurocup Formula Renault 2.0	SG Formula	2	0	0	0	0	0	NC†
2006-07	A1 Grand Prix	A1 Team France	4	0	0	0	0	3	4th‡
2007	Formula 3 Euro Series	Signature-Plus	20	0	0	0	1	23	10th
2007	Masters of Formula 3	Signature-Plus	1	0	0	0	1	N/A	**3rd**
2008	Formula 3 Euro Series	Signature-Plus	20	0	0	0	3	35	8th
2008	Masters of Formula 3	Signature-Plus	1	0	0	0	0	N/A	10th
2009	Formula 3 Euro Series	Signature	20	2	0	2	5	47	5th
2009	Masters of Formula 3	Signature	1	0	0	0	0	N/A	DNF
2009	Macau Grand Prix	Signature	1	0	0	0	1	N/A	**2nd**
2010	Indy Lights	Sam Schmidt Motorsports	13	5	3	2	9	494	**1st**
2011	Formula Renault 3.5 Series	Pons Racing	2	0	0	0	0	0	NC
2011	Blancpain Endurance Series	Vita4One	2	0	0	0	0	4	31st
2011	American Le Mans Series	Signatech Nissan	1	0	0	0	1	0	NC†
2011	Intercontinental Le Mans Cup	Peugeot Sport Total	Reserve driver						
2012	Porsche Carrera Cup France	Sébastien Loeb Racing	14	6	4	3	13	253	**1st**
2012	FIA World Endurance Championship	Luxury Racing	1	0	0	0	0	0	NC
2013	FIA World Endurance Championship - LMGTE Am	IMSA Performance Matmut	8	1	0	0	3	122	**3rd**
2013	24 Hours of Le Mans - LMGTE Am	IMSA Performance Matmut	1	1	0	0	1	N/A	**1st**
2013	European Le Mans Series - LMGTE	IMSA Performance Matmut	3	0	0	0	0	22	10th
2013	Porsche Supercup	MRS-GT Racing	9	0	0	0	0	29	13th
2014	Super GT	Dome Racing	3	0	0	0	0	11	19th
2014	GT Asia Series	Absolute Bentley Racing	3	0	0	1	1	0	NC†
2014	Macau GT Cup	Absolute Bentley Racing	1	0	0	0	0	0	10th
2015	Blancpain Endurance Series	Belgian Audi Club Team WRT	5	0	0	0	2	48	6th
2015	GT Asia Series	Bentley Team Absolute	2	0	0	0	0	16	33rd
2015	Audi R8 LMS Cup	FAW-VW Audi Racing Team	2	1	0	1	1	32	12th
2016	TCR International Series	Leopard Racing	22	3	2	4	7	246	**3rd**
2017	TCR International Series	Leopard Racing Team WRT	19	1	0	0	7	226	**1st**
2017	TCR BeNeLux Touring Car Championship	Team WRT	3	0	0	0	2	64	20th
2017	TCR China Touring Car Championship	TeamWork Motorsport	2	1	2	2	2	58	10th
2017	TCR Asia Series	TeamWork Motorsport	2	1	0	0	1	0	NC†
2017	V de V Endurance Series - LMP3	CMR / Sport Garage	1	0	0	0	0	0	31st
2018	World Touring Car Cup	Audi Sport Leopard Lukoil Team	30	4	2	4	5	245	5th
2018	TCR Europe Touring Car Series	Leopard Lukoil Team WRT	12	3	2	4	5	159	**2nd**
2018	TCR BeNeLux Touring Car Championship	Leopard Lukoil Team WRT	8	5	2	2	6	163	**1st**
2018	F4 Chinese Championship	FFA Racing	2	0	0	0	0	0	30th
2018	Stock Car Brasil	Bardahl Hot Car	1	0	0	0	0	0	NC†
2018	24H TCE Series - TCR	Liqui Moly Team Engstler							
2018-19	Asian Le Mans Series - GT	Audi Sport Customer Racing Asia by TSRT	1	0	0	0	1	18	11th
2019	World Touring Car Cup	Leopard Racing Team Audi Sport	30	0	0	1	3	211	10th
2019	Blancpain GT Series Sprint Cup	Phoenix Racing	2	0	0	0	0	0	NC
2019	TCR Australia Touring Car Series	Melbourne Performance Centre	1	1	1	1	1	42	28th
2020	World Touring Car Cup	Team Mulsanne	16	1	0	0	5	194	**3rd**
2021	World Touring Car Cup	Engstler Hyundai N Liqui Moly Racing Team	16	2	0	2	4	177	**3rd**
2021	Pure ETCR Championship	Hyundai Motorsport N	5	1	0	0	2	316	**2nd**
2021	24 Hours of Nürburgring - TCR	Hyundai Motorsport N	1	0	0	0	1	N/A	**2nd**
2022	FIA ETCR – eTouring Car World Cup	Hyundai Motorsport N	6	0	0	0	0	254	8th
2022	24 Hours of Nürburgring - TCR	Hyundai Motorsport N	1	0	0	0	1	N/A	**2nd**
2024	FIA World Endurance Championship - Hypercar	Isotta Fraschini	5	0	0	0	0	0	33rd
2026	TCR World Tour	SP Compétition	11	0	0	0	3	155	8th*

^{†} As Vernay was a guest driver, he was ineligible for points. ^{‡} Team standings. ^{*} Season still in progress.

=== Complete Eurocup Formula Renault 2.0 results ===
(key) (Races in bold indicate pole position; races in italics indicate fastest lap)

Year	Entrant	1	2	3	4	5	6	7	8	9	10	11	12	13	14	DC	Points
2006	SG Formula	ZOL; 1	ZOL; 2	IST; 1	IST; 2	MIS; 1	MIS; 2	NÜR; 1; 8	NÜR; 2; 7	DON; 1	DON; 2	LMS; 1	LMS; 2	CAT; 1	CAT; 2	NC†	0

† As Vernay was a guest driver he was ineligible for points

=== Complete A1 Grand Prix results ===
(key)

Year	Entrant	1	2	3	4	5	6	7	8	9	10	11	12	13	14	15	16	17	18	19	20	21	22	DC	Points	Ref
2006–07	France	NED; SPR	NED; FEA	CZE; SPR	CZE; FEA	CHN; SPR	CHN; FEA	MYS; SPR	MYS; FEA	IDN; SPR	IDN; FEA	NZL; SPR	NZL; FEA	AUS; SPR	AUS; FEA	RSA; SPR	RSA; FEA	MEX; SPR; Ret	MEX; FEA; 20	CHN; SPR; Ret	CHN; FEA; 8	GBR; SPR; PO	GBR; SPR; PO	4th	67	

=== Complete Formula 3 Euro Series results ===
(key) (Races in bold indicate pole position) (Races in italics indicate fastest lap)

Year	Entrant	Chassis	Engine	1	2	3	4	5	6	7	8	9	10	11	12	13	14	15	16	17	18	19	20	DC	Points
2007	Signature-Plus	Dallara F306/010	Mercedes	HOC; 1; 7	HOC; 2; 4	BRH; 1; 16	BRH; 2; 12	NOR; 1; 5	NOR; 2 Ret	MAG; 1; 8	MAG; 2; 2	MUG; 1; 5	MUG; 2 Ret	ZAN; 1 Ret	ZAN; 2; 7	NÜR; 1; 12	NÜR; 2; 10	CAT; 1 Ret	CAT; 2 Ret	NOG; 1; 8	NOG; 2; 4	HOC; 1; 10	HOC; 2 Ret	10th	23
2008	Signature-Plus	Dallara F308/033	Volkswagen	HOC; 1; 5	HOC; 2 Ret	MUG; 1; 25	MUG; 2 Ret	PAU; 1 Ret	PAU; 2; 14	NOR; 1; 3	NOR; 2; 4	ZAN; 1; 6	ZAN; 2; 4	NÜR; 1; 13	NÜR; 2; 7	BRH; 1; 8	BRH; 2; 2	CAT; 1; 17	CAT; 2; 11	BUG; 1; 5	BUG; 2; 3	HOC; 1; 5	HOC; 2; 4	8th	35
2009	Signature	Dallara F308	Volkswagen	HOC; 1; 6	HOC; 2; 1	MUG; 1; 3	MUG; 2; 12	PAU; 1; 7	PAU; 2; 2	NOR; 1; 4	NOR; 2; 5	ZAN; 1; 6	ZAN; 2; 7	NÜR; 1; 6	NÜR; 2; 15	BRH; 1; 13	BRH; 2; 8	CAT; 1 Ret	CAT; 2; 14	DIJ; 1; 18	DIJ; 2 Ret	HOC; 1; 3	HOC; 2; 1	5th	47

=== American open-wheel racing results ===
(key) (Races in bold indicate pole position) (Races in italics indicate fastest lap)

==== Indy Lights ====
Year	Team	1	2	3	4	5	6	7	8	9	10	11	12	13	Rank	Points	Ref
2010	Sam Schmidt Motorsports	STP; 1	**ALA**; 1	LBH; 3	INDY; 13	IOW; 3	WGL; 1	**TOR**; 1	EDM; 2	MOH; 8	**SNM**; 1	CHI; 4	KTY; 3	HMS; 15	1st	494	

=== Complete FIA World Endurance Championship results ===
Year	Entrant	Class	Car	Engine	1	2	3	4	5	6	7	8	Rank	Points
2012	Luxury Racing	LMGTE Pro	Ferrari 458 Italia GT2	Ferrari F142 4.5 L V8	SEB; Ret	SPA	LMS	SIL	SÃO	BHR	FUJ	SHA	NC	0
2013	IMSA Performance Matmut	LMGTE Am	Porsche 911 GT3 RSR	Porsche 4.0 L Flat-6	SIL; 7	SPA; 6	LMS; 1	SÃO; 4	COA; 3	FUJ; 5	SHA; 2	BHR; 6	3rd	122
2024	Isotta Fraschini	Hypercar	Isotta Fraschini Tipo 6 LMH-C	Isotta Fraschini 3.0 L Turbo V6	QAT; Ret	IMO; 17	SPA; 15	LMS; 14	SÃO; Ret	COA	FUJ	BHR	33rd	0

=== Complete Porsche Supercup results ===
(key) (Races in bold indicate pole position) (Races in italics indicate fastest lap)

Year	Team	1	2	3	4	5	6	7	8	9	DC	Points	Ref
2013	MRS GT-Racing	ESP; 12	MON; 11	GBR; 21	GER; 11	HUN; 11	BEL; 14	ITA; 9	UAE; Ret	UAE; DSQ	13th	29	

=== 24 Hours of Le Mans results ===
Year	Team	Co-Drivers	Car	Class	Laps	Pos.	Class Pos.
2013	(France) IMSA Performance Matmut	(France) Raymond Narac (France) Christophe Bourret	Porsche 911 GT3 RSR	LMGTE Am	306	25th	**1st**
2024	(Italy) Isotta Fraschini	(Thailand) Carl Bennett (Canada) Antonio Serravalle	Isotta Fraschini Tipo 6 LMH-C	Hypercar	302	14th	14th

=== Complete European Le Mans Series results ===
(key) (Races in bold indicate pole position) (Races in italics indicate fastest lap)

Year	Team	Class	Car	Engine	1	2	3	4	5	Rank	Points
2013	IMSA Performance Matmut	LMGTE	Porsche 997 GT3-RSR	Porsche 4.0 L Flat-6	SIL	IMO	RBR; 7	HUN; 5	LEC; 7	10th	22

=== Complete Super GT results ===
(key) (Races in bold indicate pole position) (Races in italics indicate fastest lap)

Year	Team	Car	Class	1	2	3	4	5	6	7	8	DC	Pts
2014	Dome Racing	Honda NSX-GT	GT500	OKA; 5	FUJ; 10	AUT; 7	SUG	FUJ	SUZ	BUR	MOT	19th	11

=== Complete TCR International Series results ===
(key) (Races in bold indicate pole position) (Races in italics indicate fastest lap)

Year	Team	Car	1	2	3	4	5	6	7	8	9	10	11	12	13	14	15	16	17	18	19	20	21	22	DC	Points
2016	Leopard Racing	Volkswagen Golf GTI TCR	BHR; 1 Ret	BHR; 2 DSQ	EST; 1; 2	EST; 2; 5	SPA; 1; 14	SPA; 2; 1	IMO; 1; 11	IMO; 2; 4	SAL; 1; 5	SAL; 2; 1	OSC; 1; 6	OSC; 2 Ret	SOC; 1; 5	SOC; 2; 2	CHA; 1; 5	CHA; 2; 8	**MRN**; **1**; 1	MRN; 2; 6	SEP; 1; 5	SEP; 2; 5	**MAC**; **1**; 2	MAC; 2; 2	3rd	246
2017	Leopard Racing Team WRT	Volkswagen Golf GTI TCR	RIM; 1; 6	RIM; 2; 3	BHR; 1; 3	BHR; 2; 4	SPA; 1; 4	SPA; 2; 1	MNZ; 1; 4	MNZ; 2; 5	SAL; 1; 17†	SAL; 2 DNS	HUN; 1; 3	HUN; 2; 7	OSC; 1 Ret	OSC; 2; 3	CHA; 1; 4	CHA; 2; 5	ZHE; 1; 2	ZHE; 2; 12	DUB; 1; 3	DUB; 2; 15†			1st	226

^{†} Driver did not finish the race, but was classified as he completed over 75% of the race distance.

=== Complete World Touring Car Cup results ===
(key) (Races in bold indicate pole position) (Races in italics indicate fastest lap)

Year	Team	Car	1	2	3	4	5	6	7	8	9	10	11	12	13	14	15	16	17	18	19	20	21	22	23	24	25	26	27	28	29	30	DC	Points
2018	Audi Sport Leopard Lukoil Team	Audi RS 3 LMS TCR	MAR; 1; 4	MAR; 2; 1	MAR; 3; 9	HUN; 1; 8	HUN; 2; 10	HUN; 3; 10	GER; 1; 5	GER; 2; 7	GER; 3; 7	NED; 1; 5	NED; 2 Ret	**NED**; **3**; 1	POR; 1; 5	POR; 2; 4	POR; 3; 10	SVK; 1; 2	SVK; 2 Ret	SVK; 3 Ret	CHN; 1 Ret	CHN; 2 Ret	CHN; 3; 12	**WUH**; **1**; 1	WUH; 2; 5	WUH; 3; 15	JPN; 1; 6	JPN; 2; 13	JPN; 3; 10	MAC; 1; 1	MAC; 2 Ret	MAC; 3; 22†	5th	245
2019	Leopard Racing Team Audi Sport	Audi RS 3 LMS TCR	MAR; 1; 7	MAR; 2; 2	MAR; 3 Ret	HUN; 1; 4	HUN; 2; 2	HUN; 3; 10	SVK; 1; 4	SVK; 2; 12	SVK; 3 Ret	NED; 1; 22	NED; 2; 15	NED; 3; 25	GER; 1; 12	GER; 2; 9	GER; 3; 4	POR; 1 DSQ	POR; 2; 4	POR; 3 DSQ	CHN; 1; 16	CHN; 2; 10	CHN; 3 Ret	JPN; 1; 6	JPN; 2; 9	JPN; 3; 9	MAC; 1; 21	MAC; 2; 9	MAC; 3; 3	MAL; 1; 10	MAL; 2; 14	MAL; 3; 10	10th	211
2020	Team Mulsanne	Alfa Romeo Giulietta Veloce TCR	BEL; 1; 5	BEL; 2; 7	GER; 1; 9	GER; 2; 6	SVK; 1; 3	SVK; 2; 14	SVK; 3; 4	HUN; 1; 9	HUN; 2; 3	HUN; 3; 5	ESP; 1; 1	ESP; 2 Ret	ESP; 3; 6	ARA; 1; 8	ARA; 2; 2	ARA; 3; 3															3rd	194
2021	Engstler Hyundai N Liqui Moly Racing Team	Hyundai Elantra N TCR	GER; 1; 10	GER; 2; 1	POR; 1 Ret	POR; 2; 2	ESP; 1; 9	ESP; 2; 4	HUN; 1; 14	HUN; 2; 13	CZE; 1; 6	CZE; 2; 14	FRA; 1; 6	FRA; 2; 1	ITA; 1; 14	ITA; 2; 19	RUS; 1; 2	RUS; 2; 5															3rd	177

^{†} Driver did not finish the race, but was classified as he completed over 90% of the race distance.

=== Complete TCR Europe Touring Car Series results ===
(key) (Races in bold indicate pole position) (Races in italics indicate fastest lap)

Year	Team	Car	1	2	3	4	5	6	7	8	9	10	11	12	13	14	DC	Points
2018	Leopard Lukoil Team WRT	Audi RS 3 LMS TCR	LEC; 1; 6	LEC; 2; 2	ZAN; 1	ZAN; 2	**SPA**; **1**; 1^{1}	SPA; 2 Ret	HUN; 1; 7	HUN; 2; 20	ASS; 1; 2^{2}	ASS; 2; 7	**MNZ**; **1**; 1^{1}	MNZ; 2; 1	CAT; 1; 6	CAT; 2; 7	2nd	159

=== Complete TCR World Tour results ===
(key) (Races in bold indicate pole position) (Races in italics indicate fastest lap)

Year	Team	Car	1	2	3	4	5	6	7	8	9	10	11	12	13	14	15	16	17	18	19	20	DC	Points
2026	SP Competition	Cupra León VZ TCR	MIS; 1; 9	MIS; 2; 14	CRT; 1 WD	CRT; 2 WD	CRT; 3 WD	LEC; 1	LEC; 2	CVR; 1	CVR; 2	INJ; 1; 8	INJ; 2; 5	INJ; 3; 9	CHE; 1; 3	CHE; 2; 2	CHE; 3; 3	ZHZ; 1; 7	ZHZ; 2; 4	ZHZ; 3 Ret	MAC; 1	MAC; 2	8th*	155*

^{*} Season still in progress.

Sporting positions
Preceded by Loïc Duval	Formula Campus; Champion; 2005	Succeeded by Kévin Estre
Preceded by J. R. Hildebrand	Indy Lights; Champion; 2010	Succeeded by Josef Newgarden
Preceded by Kévin Estre	Porsche Carrera Cup France; Champion; 2012	Succeeded by Gael Castelli
Preceded by Stefano Comini	TCR International Series; Champion; 2017	Succeeded by Gabriele Tarquini (WTCR)
Preceded by Benjamin Lessennes	TCR BeNeLux Touring Car Championship; Champion; 2018	Succeeded by Julien Briché
Preceded by Inaugural	WTCR Trophy; Champion; 2020	Succeeded by Gilles Magnus
