= FIA WTCR Race of Belgium =

- Circuit Zolder (2010–2011, 2020)

Race information
- Number of times held: 5
- First held: 2005
- Last held: 2020
- Most wins (drivers): (Italy) Gabriele Tarquini (2)
- Most wins (constructors): (Germany) BMW (2) (Spain) SEAT (2) (France) Citroën (2)

Last race (2020)
- Race 1 Winner: (Argentina) Néstor Girolami; (ALL-INKL.COM Münnich Motorsport)
- Race 2 Winner: (France) Yann Ehrlacher; (Cyan Racing Lynk & Co)

The FIA WTCR Race of Belgium, previously known as the FIA WTCC Race of Belgium, is a round of the World Touring Car Cup, most recently held at the Circuit Zolder in Belgium. It has also been held at Circuit de Spa-Francorchamps.

The race was run in the first season of the revived World Touring Car Championship in 2005, at the Circuit de Spa-Francorchamps. Having been left off the calendar for four seasons, the Race of Belgium returned in 2010, this time being held at Zolder. Having also run in 2011, Belgium was left off the 2012 calendar. The race is scheduled to return for the 2014 season, returning to the Spa–Francorchamps circuit with a provisional date of 22 June. Belgium was dropped from the calendar once again when the 2015 schedule was revealed.

No Belgian drivers have won their home race although two drivers, Pierre-Yves Corthals and Vincent Radermecker have both contested their home event.

== Winners ==
Spa-Francorchamps, which held races in 2005 and 2014

Year	Race	Driver	Manufacturer	Location	Report
2020	Race 1	(Argentina) Néstor Girolami	(Japan) Honda	Zolder	Report
2020	Race 2	(France) Yann Ehrlacher	(Sweden) Lynk & Co	Zolder	Report
2014	Race 1	(France) Yvan Muller	(France) Citroën	Spa-Francorchamps	Report
2014	Race 2	(Argentina) José María López	(France) Citroën	Spa-Francorchamps	Report
2011	Race 1	(United Kingdom) Robert Huff	(United States) Chevrolet	Zolder	Report
2011	Race 2	(Italy) Gabriele Tarquini	(Spain) SEAT	Zolder	Report
2010	Race 1	(Italy) Gabriele Tarquini	(Spain) SEAT	Zolder	Report
2010	Race 2	(United Kingdom) Andy Priaulx	(Germany) BMW	Zolder	Report
2005	Race 1	(Germany) Dirk Müller	(Germany) BMW	Spa-Francorchamps	Report
2005	Race 2	(Italy) Fabrizio Giovanardi	(Italy) Alfa Romeo	Spa-Francorchamps	Report
