= Nathanaël Berthon =

French racing driver (born 1989)

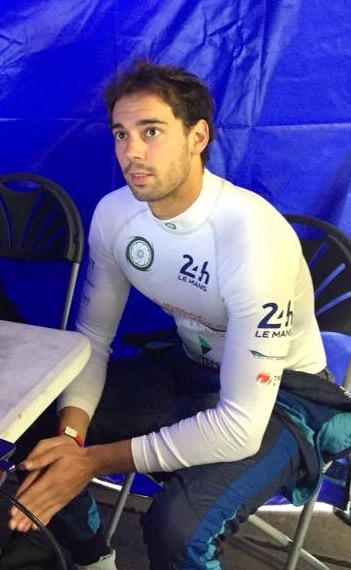
- Berthon testing for Team Aguri at Donington Park in 2015
- Nationality: (France) French
- Born: Nathanaël Antonin Berthon; 1 July 1989 (age 37) Romagnat, France

GP2 Series career
- Debut season: 2012
- Current team: Daiko Team Lazarus
- Categorisation: FIA Gold
- Car number: 26
- Former teams: Trident Racing; Racing Engineering
- Starts: 87
- Wins: 1
- Poles: 0
- Fastest laps: 2
- Best finish: 12th in 2012

Previous series
- 2012 2010–11 2011 2008–09 2008–09: Toyota Racing Series; Formula Renault 3.5 Series; GP2 Asia Series; Eurocup Formula Renault 2.0; Formula Renault 2.0 WEC

Championship titles
- 2016–17 2009: Andros Trophy – Elite Class; French Formula Renault 2.0

Formula E career
- Debut season: 2015–16
- Current team: Team Aguri
- Car number: 77
- Starts: 3
- Wins: 0
- Poles: 0
- Fastest laps: 0
- Best finish: 17th in 2015–16
- Finished last season: 17th

Nathanaël Antonin Berthon (born 1 July 1989 in Romagnat) is a professional racing driver from France.

== Career ==
=== Karting ===
Berthon began his international karting career in 2006, with the highlights being a third-place finish in the Copa Campeones Trophy ICA class and fifth in the French Championship Elite category. The following year, he again finished fifth in the French Championship Elite class. He also finished eighth in the South Garda Winter Cup KF1 and 13th in the World Cup KF1 categories.

=== Formula Renault 2.0 ===
In 2008, Berthon moved up to single–seaters, taking part in both the Formula Renault 2.0 West European Cup and Eurocup Formula Renault 2.0 series for Boutsen Energy Racing. In the West European Cup, he finished in the points on four occasions, scoring nine points to be classified in 18th place, whilst in the Eurocup, he failed to score a point, with his best race result being 12th place at the Nürburgring meeting.

2009 saw Berthon remain in both series for a second season, this time racing for the Spanish team Epsilon Euskadi. He won his first Eurocup race at the opening round in Barcelona after teammate Albert Costa was disqualified for a technical infringement. He followed that up with a further podium at the Hungaroring to finish sixth in the standings.

In the West European Cup, Berthon took a victory at Spa–Francorchamps along with six other podium finishes to finish third in the championship, behind Jean-Éric Vergne and champion Costa. He was also crowned as French Formula Renault 2.0 champion, with the series being run as part of the West European Cup season.

=== Formula Renault 3.5 Series ===
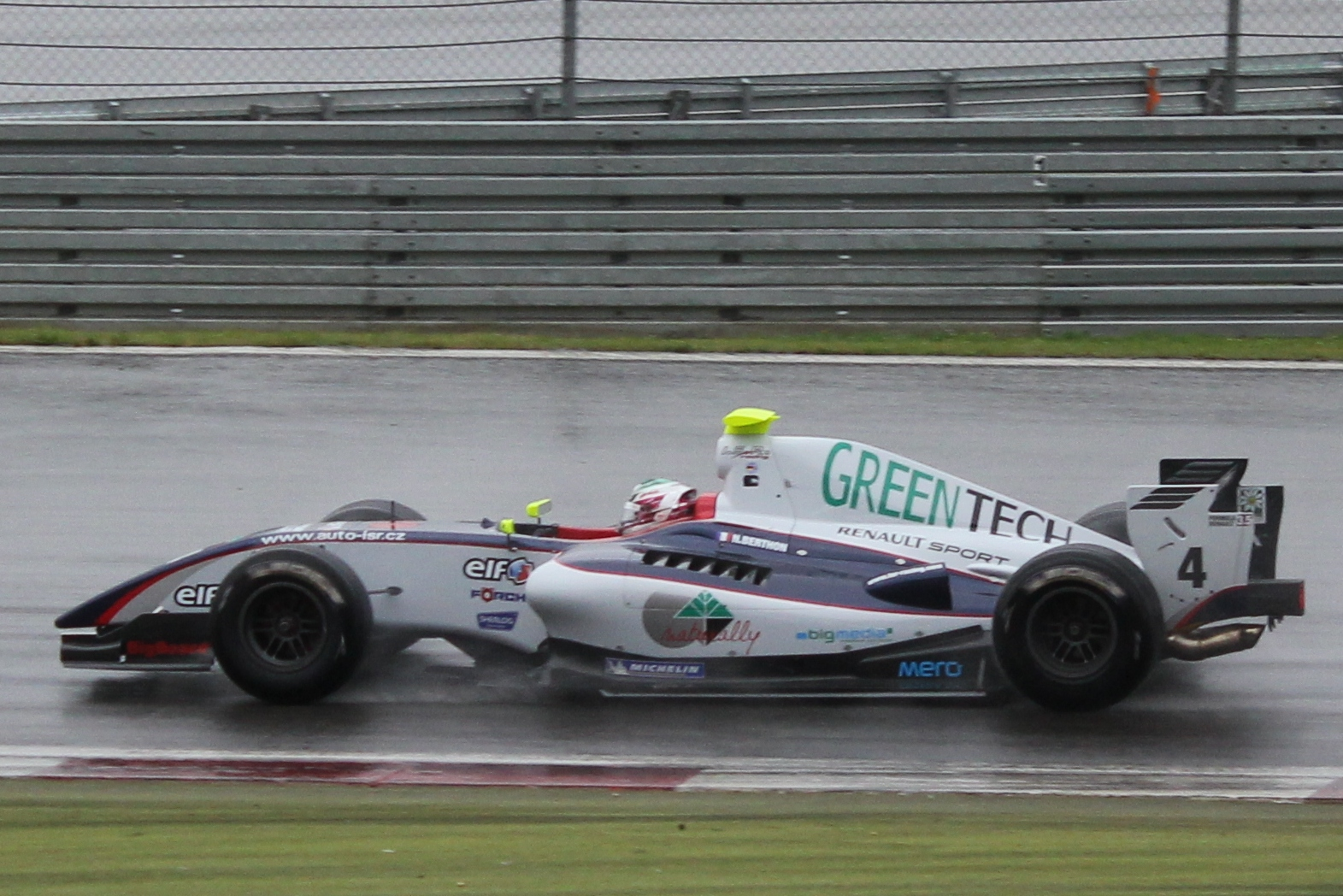
Nathanaël Berthon at the 2011 Nürburgring World series by Renault round

In October 2009, Berthon sampled a Formula Renault 3.5 Series car for the first time, testing for Tech 1 Racing at Motorland Aragón in Spain as a reward for winning the French Formula Renault 2.0 title. He drove for the recently–crowned champions Draco Racing during the next test at the Circuit de Catalunya and in December 2009 it was announced that he would drive for the team in the 2010 season. He was joined at the team by Colombian driver Omar Leal.

After finishing on the podium at the season–opener in Motorland Aragón and again at Brno, Berthon secured his first Formula Renault 3.5 Series win on home soil at Magny–Cours, holding off a stiff challenge from Tech 1 Racing's Daniel Ricciardo. He followed that up with another podium finish at Hockenheim to be classified in seventh place in the championship standings.

Berthon returned to the series in 2011, replacing Dean Stoneman at ISR Racing after the Briton was forced to pull out of the championship due to illness. Partnered variously by Ricciardo and Lewis Williamson, he took a first finish of third place to finish 13th overall in the drivers' championship.

=== Formula Three ===
In July 2010, Berthon made his Formula Three debut, racing for the ART Grand Prix team in the British Formula 3 Championship round at Spa–Francorchamps as an entry in the Invitation class. During the weekend, he finished all three races, taking a best result of 13th place in the sprint event.

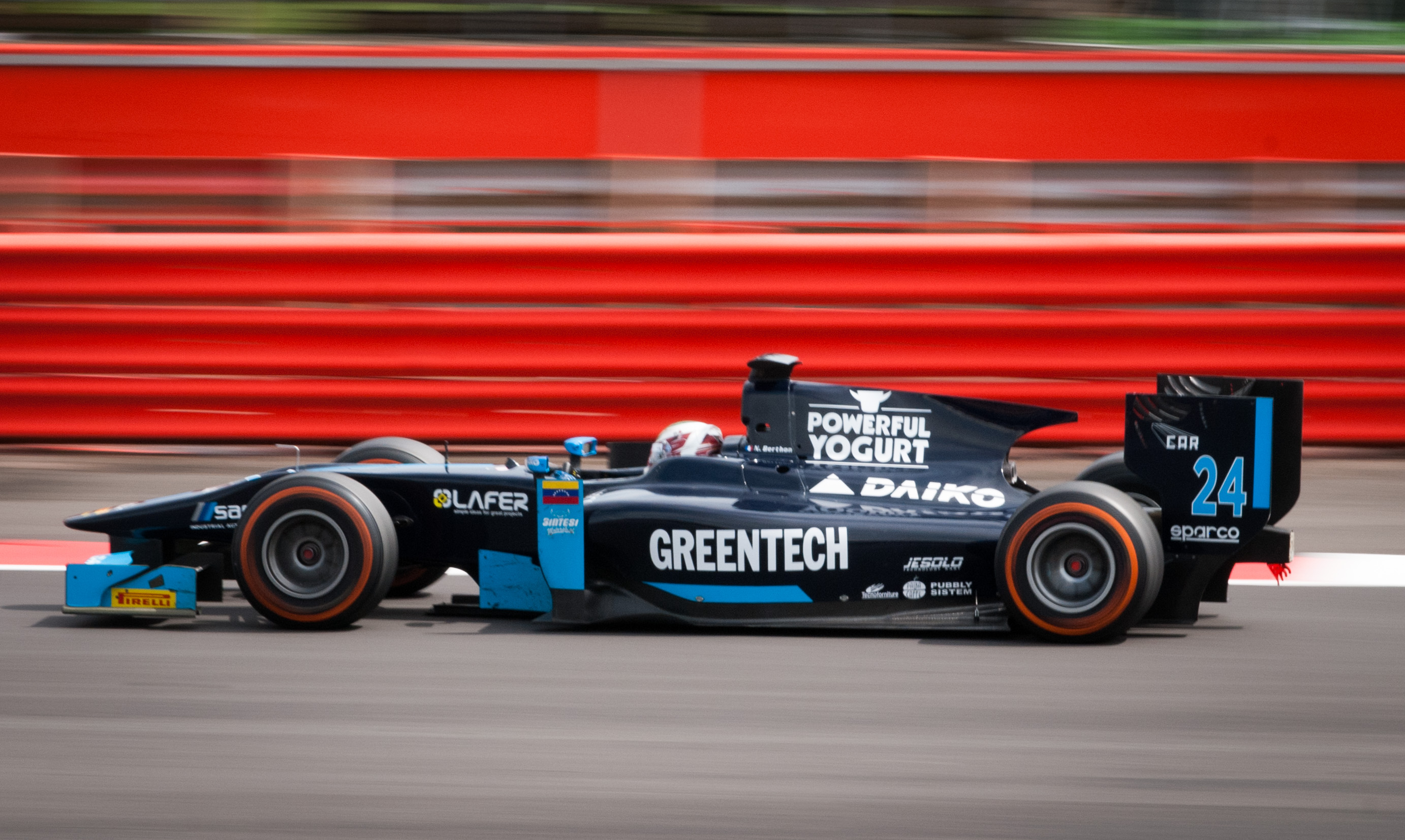
Berthon competing at the Silverstone round of the 2014 GP2 Series.

=== GP2 Series ===
Berthon made his debut in the GP2 Asia Series in 2011, partnering Spaniard Dani Clos at the Racing Engineering team. He failed to score a point in the four races he contested and was classified in 23rd place in the championship. He returned to the main GP2 Series, again with Racing Engineering, for the non-championship race that concluded the 2011 season, and raced full-time for the team in 2012, alongside Fabio Leimer, eventually finishing 12th overall with a best race finish of second on two occasions.

=== Toyota Racing Series ===
In the winter of 2012 prior to the start of the GP2 season, Berthon travelled to New Zealand to compete in the five-round Toyota Racing Series in a grid which featured a mix of local and foreign drivers. As one of five drivers for the M2 Competition team, he finished seventh in the championship.

=== Formula One ===
On 16 November 2011, Berthon had his first experience of driving a Formula One car. At the Abu Dhabi young drivers' test at the Yas Marina Circuit, he drove the HRT F1 Team's F111 for nine laps. He set a best time of 1:48.646, which left him 13th fastest. The following day, Berthon had the whole day to himself with the car, completing 51 laps (283 kilometres (176 mi)) and finished the day in 12th position with a best time of 1:45.839. Berthon described the day by saying: "Today was a great experience but it felt like it was too short. I would like to spend some more time in the car but, as a first step, it was very good".

=== Formula E ===
On 17 October 2015, it was announced that Berthon would partner António Félix da Costa at Team Aguri for the 2015–16 season. Berthon was replaced by Salvador Durán after three races; he has not raced in Formula E since.

== Racing record ==
=== Career summary ===
Season	Series	Team	Races	Wins	Poles	F/Laps	Podiums	Points	Position
2008	Formula Renault 2.0 WEC	Boutsen Energy Racing	15	0	0	0	0	9	18th
2008	Eurocup Formula Renault 2.0	Boutsen Energy Racing	14	0	0	0	0	0	33rd
2009	Eurocup Formula Renault 2.0	Epsilon Euskadi	14	1	0	0	2	67	6th
2009	Formula Renault 2.0 WEC	Epsilon Euskadi	14	1	1	1	7	120	**3rd**
2010	Formula Renault 3.5 Series	International DracoRacing	17	1	0	0	4	60	7th
2010	British Formula 3 International Series	ART Grand Prix	3	0	0	0	0	0	NC†
2011	Formula Renault 3.5 Series	ISR Racing	17	0	0	0	1	37	13th
2011	GP2 Asia Series	Racing Engineering	4	0	0	0	0	0	23rd
2011	GP2 Final	Racing Engineering	2	0	0	0	0	0	11th
2012	GP2 Series	Racing Engineering	24	0	0	0	2	60	12th
2012	Toyota Racing Series	M2 Competition	15	0	0	1	0	755	7th
2013	GP2 Series	Trident Racing	22	1	0	1	1	21	20th
2014	GP2 Series	Venezuela GP Lazarus	22	0	0	0	0	17	20th
2014	European Le Mans Series - LMP2	Murphy Prototypes	2	0	1	0	1	16	16th
2014	24 Hours of Le Mans - LMP2	Murphy Prototypes	1	0	0	0	0	N/A	DNF
2014	Formula Acceleration 1	Acceleration Team France	2	0	0	0	0	22	12th
2014	Formula Acceleration 1	Acceleration Team China	2	0	0	0	0	22	12th
2014	FIA World Endurance Championship	Lotus	1	0	0	0	0	0	28th
2015	GP2 Series	Daiko Team Lazarus	19	0	0	1	1	27	16th
2015	European Le Mans Series - LMP2	Murphy Prototypes	5	0	0	0	1	26	10th
2015	24 Hours of Le Mans - LMP2	Murphy Prototypes	1	0	0	0	0	N/A	5th
2015–16	Formula E	Team Aguri	3	0	0	0	0	4	17th
2015–16	Andros Trophy - Électrique	Biovitis	11	2	0	2	4	316	4th
2016	FIA World Endurance Championship - LMP2	G-Drive Racing	2	0	2	0	1	27	22nd
2016	European Le Mans Series - LMP2	Greaves Motorsport	4	0	0	0	0	28	11th
2016	24 Hours of Le Mans - LMP2	Greaves Motorsport	1	0	0	0	0	N/A	6th
2016–17	Andros Trophy - Elite	Belgian Audi Club Team WRT	13	4	4	4	8	614	**1st**
2017	European Le Mans Series - LMP2	Panis Barthez Competition	5	0	1	0	0	35	13th
2017	24 Hours of Le Mans - LMP2	Panis Barthez Competition	1	0	0	0	0	N/A	DNF
2017	Blancpain GT Series Endurance Cup	Belgian Audi Club Team WRT	4	0	0	0	0	2	45th
2017	Intercontinental GT Challenge	Team WRT	1	0	0	0	0	0	NC
2017–18	Andros Trophy - Elite Pro	Comtoyou Racing	13	2	2	1	7	618	**3rd**
2018	World Touring Car Cup	Comtoyou Racing	30	0	0	0	1	79	15th
2018	TCR Europe Touring Car Series	Comtoyou Racing	2	0	0	0	0	0	NC
2018	TCR BeNeLux Touring Car Championship	Comtoyou Racing	2	0	0	0	0	2	11th
2018	24 Hours of Le Mans - LMP2	DragonSpeed	1	0	0	1	0	N/A	5th
2018–19	Andros Trophy - Elite Pro	Comtoyou Racing	11	0	0	0	5	606	5th
2018–19	FIA World Endurance Championship - LMP1	Rebellion Racing	3	0	0	0	1	51	9th
2018–19	FIA World Endurance Championship - LMP2	DragonSpeed	2	0	1	1	1	34	12th
2019	24 Hours of Le Mans	Rebellion Racing	1	0	0	1	0	N/A	5th
2019–20	Andros Trophy - Elite Pro Class	Sylvain Pussier Competition	10	0	0	0	2	457	5th
2019–20	FIA World Endurance Championship - LMP1	Rebellion Racing	2	0	0	0	0	0	NC†
2020	World Touring Car Cup	Comtoyou DHL Team Audi Sport	16	1	3	2	2	148	8th
2020	24 Hours of Le Mans - LMP1	Rebellion Racing	1	0	0	0	0	N/A	4th
2020	24H TCE Europe Series - TCR	Audi Sport Team Comtoyou	1	0	0	0	0	0	30th
2020-21	Andros Trophy - Elite Pro	Sylvain Pussier Competition	11	3	2	2	4	518	**3rd**
2021	World Touring Car Cup	Comtoyou DHL Team Audi Sport	16	0	0	0	1	114	13th
2021	24H GT Series - P4	Car Collection Motorsport	2	0	0	0	0	0	NC†
2021–22	Andros Trophy - Elite Pro	Sylvain Pussier Competition	9	1	1	2	3	502	4th
2022	World Touring Car Cup	Comtoyou DHL Team Audi Sport	16	2	1	2	5	240	**3rd**
2022	Intercontinental GT Challenge	Audi Sport Team Valvoline	1	0	0	0	0	12	16th
2022–23	Andros Trophy - Elite Pro	SP Competition	10	0	0	1	6	510	4th
2023	European Le Mans Series - LMP2 Pro-Am	DKR Engineering	6	0	0	0	0	32	12th
2023	FIA World Endurance Championship - Hypercar	Glickenhaus Racing	1	0	0	0	0	4	19th
2023	24 Hours of Le Mans - Hypercar	Glickenhaus Racing	1	0	0	0	0	N/A	7th
2024	Nürburgring Langstrecken-Serie - SP3T	MSC Sinzig e.V. im ADAC							
2025	Nürburgring Langstrecken-Serie - TCR	Goroyan RT by sharky-racing							
2026	Nürburgring Langstrecken-Serie - SP9	Goroyan RT by Car Collection							
2026	24 Hours of Nürburgring - SP9 Pro-Am	Goroyan RT by Car Collection	1	0	0	0	0	N/A	5th
2026	Nürburgring Langstrecken-Serie - SP3T	Sharky Racing							

^{†} As Berthon was a guest driver, he was ineligible for championship points.

=== Complete Eurocup Formula Renault 2.0 results ===
(key) (Races in bold indicate pole position; races in italics indicate fastest lap)

Year	Entrant	1	2	3	4	5	6	7	8	9	10	11	12	13	14	DC	Points
2008	Boutsen Energy Racing	SPA; 1; 39†	SPA; 2; 20	SIL; 1; 27	SIL; 2; 30	HUN; 1; 26	HUN; 2; 23	NÜR; 1; 12	NÜR; 2; 19	LMS; 1; 17	LMS; 2; 25	EST; 1; 24	EST; 2 Ret	CAT; 1; 23	CAT; 2; 24	33rd	0
2009	Epsilon Euskadi	CAT; 1; 1	CAT; 2 Ret	SPA; 1; 7	SPA; 2; 6	HUN; 1; 2	HUN; 2; 24†	SIL; 1; 8	SIL; 2; 8	LMS; 1; 6	LMS; 2; 4	NÜR; 1 Ret	NÜR; 2; 7	ALC; 1; 9	ALC; 2; 7	6th	67

=== Complete Formula Renault 3.5 Series results ===
(key) (Races in bold indicate pole position) (Races in italics indicate fastest lap)

Year	Team	1	2	3	4	5	6	7	8	9	10	11	12	13	14	15	16	17	Pos	Points
2010	International Draco Racing	ALC; 1 Ret	ALC; 2; 3	SPA; 1 Ret	SPA; 2; 10	MON; 1 Ret	BRN; 1; 8	BRN; 2; 2	MAG; 1; 9	MAG; 2; 1	HUN; 1 Ret	HUN; 2; 13	HOC; 1; 9	HOC; 2; 3	SIL; 1 Ret	SIL; 2 Ret	CAT; 1; 6	CAT; 2; 12	7th	60
2011	ISR	ALC; 1; 12	ALC; 2; 8	SPA; 1; 14	SPA; 2; 16	MNZ; 1 Ret	MNZ; 2 Ret	MON; 1; 10	NÜR; 1 Ret	NÜR; 2 Ret	HUN; 1; 9	HUN; 2; 10	SIL; 1; 4	SIL; 2; 3	LEC; 1; 14	LEC; 2; 14	CAT; 1; 9	CAT; 2 Ret	13th	37

=== Complete GP2 Series results ===
(key) (Races in bold indicate pole position) (Races in italics indicate fastest lap)

Year	Entrant	1	2	3	4	5	6	7	8	9	10	11	12	13	14	15	16	17	18	19	20	21	22	23	24	DC	Points
2012	Racing Engineering	SEP; FEA; 11	SEP; SPR; 8	BHR1; FEA; 21	BHR1; SPR; Ret	BHR2; FEA; 12	BHR2; SPR; 10	CAT; FEA; 5	CAT; SPR; 2	MON; FEA; 9	MON; SPR; 7	VAL; FEA; 6	VAL; SPR; 5	SIL; FEA; 12	SIL; SPR; 14	HOC; FEA; 15	HOC; SPR; 9	HUN; FEA; 7	HUN; SPR; 2	SPA; FEA; 14	SPA; SPR; 19	MNZ; FEA; 15	MNZ; SPR; 15	MRN; FEA; 10	MRN; SPR; 15	12th	60
2013	Trident Racing	SEP; FEA; Ret	SEP; SPR; 21	BHR; FEA; 17	BHR; SPR; 22	CAT; FEA; Ret	CAT; SPR; 23	MON; FEA; Ret	MON; SPR; 21	SIL; FEA; 20	SIL; SPR; Ret	NÜR; FEA; 17	NÜR; SPR; 15	HUN; FEA; 8	HUN; SPR; 1	SPA; FEA; 22	SPA; SPR; 13	MNZ; FEA; Ret	MNZ; SPR; 21	MRN; FEA; Ret	MRN; SPR; 10	YMC; FEA; 18†	YMC; SPR; 13			20th	21
2014	Venezuela GP Lazarus	BHR; FEA; 23†	BHR; SPR; 17	CAT; FEA; Ret	CAT; SPR; Ret	MON; FEA; 17	MON; SPR; 12	RBR; FEA; 22	RBR; SPR; 25	SIL; FEA; 17	SIL; SPR; 12	HOC; FEA; 8	HOC; SPR; 17	HUN; FEA; 8	HUN; SPR; 4	SPA; FEA; 22	SPA; SPR; 15	MNZ; FEA; 13	MNZ; SPR; 19†	SOC; FEA; 10	SOC; SPR; 9	YMC; FEA; 15	YMC; SPR; 13			20th	17
2015	Daiko Team Lazarus	BHR; FEA; 7	BHR; SPR; 3	CAT; FEA; 20	CAT; SPR; 12	MON; FEA; 17	MON; SPR; 15	RBR; FEA; Ret	RBR; SPR; 17	SIL; FEA; Ret	SIL; SPR; 21	HUN; FEA; 14	HUN; SPR; 11	SPA; FEA; 7	SPA; SPR; 7	MNZ; FEA	MNZ; SPR	SOC; FEA; 14	SOC; SPR; 19	BHR; FEA; 11	BHR; SPR; Ret	YMC; FEA; 10	YMC; SPR; C			16th	27

^{†} Driver did not finish the race, but was classified as he completed over 90% of the race distance.

==== Complete GP2 Asia Series results ====
(key) (Races in bold indicate pole position) (Races in italics indicate fastest lap)

Year	Entrant	1	2	3	4	DC	Points
2011	Racing Engineering	YMC; FEA; Ret	YMC; SPR; 14	IMO; FEA; Ret	IMO; SPR; 13	23rd	0

==== Complete GP2 Final results ====
(key) (Races in bold indicate pole position) (Races in italics indicate fastest lap)

Year	Entrant	1	2	DC	Points
2011	Racing Engineering	YMC; FEA; 9	YMC; SPR; 19	11th	0

=== Complete 24 Hours of Le Mans results ===
Year	Team	Co-Drivers	Car	Class	Laps	Pos.	Class Pos.
2014	(Republic of Ireland) Murphy Prototypes	(Venezuela) Rodolfo González (India) Karun Chandhok	Oreca 03R-Nissan	LMP2	73	DNF	DNF
2015	(Republic of Ireland) Murphy Prototypes	(United States) Mark Patterson (India) Karun Chandhok	Oreca 03R-Nissan	LMP2	347	13th	5th
2016	(United Kingdom) Greaves Motorsport	(France) Julien Canal (Mexico) Memo Rojas	Ligier JS P2-Nissan	LMP2	348	10th	6th
2017	(France) Panis Barthez Competition	(France) Fabien Barthez (France) Timothé Buret	Ligier JS P217-Gibson	LMP2	296	DNF	DNF
2018	(United States) DragonSpeed	(Mexico) Roberto González (Venezuela) Pastor Maldonado	Oreca 07-Gibson	LMP2	360	9th	5th
2019	(Switzerland) Rebellion Racing	(United States) Gustavo Menezes (France) Thomas Laurent	Rebellion R13-Gibson	LMP1	370	5th	5th
2020	(Switzerland) Rebellion Racing	(Switzerland) Louis Delétraz (France) Romain Dumas	Rebellion R13-Gibson	LMP1	381	4th	4th
2023	(United States) Glickenhaus Racing	(Mexico) Esteban Gutiérrez (France) Franck Mailleux	Glickenhaus SCG 007 LMH	Hypercar	333	7th	7th

=== Complete FIA World Endurance Championship results ===
Year	Entrant	Class	Chassis	Engine	1	2	3	4	5	6	7	8	9	Rank	Points
2014	Lotus	LMP1	CLM P1/01	AER P60 Turbo V6	SIL	SPA	LMS	COA	FUJ	SHA	BHR; Ret	SÃO		28th	0
2016	G-Drive Racing	LMP2	Oreca 05	Nissan VK45DE 4.5 L V8	**SIL**; 3	**SPA**; 5	LMS	NÜR	MEX	COA	FUJ	SHA	BHR	22nd	27
2018–19	DragonSpeed	LMP2	Oreca 07	Gibson GK428 4.2 L V8	SPA; 5	**LMS**; 3	SIL	FUJ	SHA					12th	34
2018–19	Rebellion Racing	LMP1	Rebellion R13	Gibson GL458 4.5 L V8						SEB; 7	SPA; 2	LMS; 5		9th	51
2023	Glickenhaus Racing	Hypercar	Glickenhaus SCG 007 LMH	Glickenhaus 3.5 L Turbo V8	SEB	ALG	SPA	LMS	MNZ; 8	FUJ	BHR			19th	4

=== Complete Formula Acceleration 1 results ===
(key) (Races in bold indicate pole position) (Races in italics indicate fastest lap)

Year	Team	1	2	3	4	5	6	7	8	9	10	Pos	Points
2014	France	ALG; 1	ALG; 2	NAV; 1; 10	NAV; 2; 10	NÜR; 1	NÜR; 2	MNZ; 1	MNZ; 2			12th	22
2014	China									ASS; 1; 4	ASS; 2; 5	12th	22

=== Complete European Le Mans Series results ===
Year	Entrant	Class	Chassis	Engine	1	2	3	4	5	6	Rank	Points
2014	Murphy Prototypes	LMP2	Oreca 03	Nissan VK45DE 4.5 L V8	SIL	IMO; Ret	RBR	**LEC**; 3	EST		16th	16
2015	Murphy Prototypes	LMP2	Oreca 03R	Nissan VK45DE 4.5 L V8	SIL; Ret	IMO; 2	RBR; 6	LEC; Ret	EST; Ret		10th	26
2016	Greaves Motorsport	LMP2	Ligier JS P2	Nissan VK45DE 4.5 L V8	SIL	IMO	RBR; 6	LEC; 6	SPA; 4	EST; Ret	11th	28
2017	Panis Barthez Competition	LMP2	Ligier JS P217	Gibson GK428 4.2 L V8	SIL; 9	MNZ	RBR; 5	LEC; 4	SPA; 9	**ALG**; 6	13th	35
2023	DKR Engineering	LMP2 Pro-Am	Oreca 07	Gibson GK428 4.2 L V8	CAT; 5	LEC; 9	ARA; 8	SPA; 8	ALG; 8	ALG; 6	12th	32

=== Complete Formula E results ===
(key) (Races in bold indicate pole position; races in italics indicate fastest lap)

Year	Team	Chassis	Powertrain	1	2	3	4	5	6	7	8	9	10	Pos	Points
2015–16	Team Aguri	Spark SRT01-e	SRT01-e	BEI; 8	PUT; 15	PDE; 14	BUE	MEX	LBH	PAR	BER	LDN	LDN	17th	4

=== Complete World Touring Car Cup results ===
(key) (Races in bold indicate pole position) (Races in italics indicate fastest lap)

Year	Team	Car	1	2	3	4	5	6	7	8	9	10	11	12	13	14	15	16	17	18	19	20	21	22	23	24	25	26	27	28	29	30	DC	Points
2018	Comtoyou Racing	Audi RS 3 LMS TCR	MAR; 1; 12	MAR; 2; 15	MAR; 3 Ret	HUN; 1; 11	HUN; 2; 14	HUN; 3; 16	GER; 1; 20	GER; 2; 8	GER; 3; 5	NED; 1; 9	NED; 2; 15	NED; 3; 11	POR; 1; 8	POR; 2 Ret	POR; 3 Ret	SVK; 1; 10	SVK; 2; 12	SVK; 3 Ret	CHN; 1 Ret	CHN; 2; 8	CHN; 3; 8	WUH; 1; 8	WUH; 2; 3	WUH; 3; 5	JPN; 1; 12	JPN; 2; 17	JPN; 3; 20	MAC; 1; 18	MAC; 2; 7	MAC; 3; 9	15th	79
2020	Comtoyou DHL Team Audi Sport	Audi RS 3 LMS TCR	BEL; 1; 9	**BEL**; **2**; 14	GER; 1; 12	GER; 2; 12	**SVK**; **1**; 1	SVK; 2 Ret	**SVK**; **3**; 2	HUN; 1; 12	HUN; 2; 11	HUN; 3; 11	ESP; 1; 12	ESP; 2; 4	ESP; 3; 4	ARA; 1; 4	ARA; 2 NC	ARA; 3; 8															8th	148
2021	Comtoyou DHL Team Audi Sport	Audi RS 3 LMS TCR	GER; 1; 11	GER; 2; 6	POR; 1; 11	POR; 2; 12	ESP; 1; 4	ESP; 2; 5	HUN; 1 Ret	HUN; 2; 12	CZE; 1 Ret	CZE; 2; 5	FRA; 1; 11	FRA; 2; 10	ITA; 1; 21	ITA; 2; 14	RUS; 1; 4	RUS; 2; 3															13th	114
2022	Comtoyou DHL Team Audi Sport	Audi RS 3 LMS TCR	FRA; 1; 16	FRA; 2; 4	GER; 1 C	GER; 2 C	HUN; 1; 3	HUN; 2; 12	ESP; 1; 4	ESP; 2; 8	POR; 1; 10	POR; 2 Ret	ITA; 1; 9	ITA; 2; 2	ALS; 1; 1	ALS; 2; 8	BHR; 1; 3	BHR; 2; 5	**SAU**; **1**; **1**	SAU; 2 Ret													3rd	240

=== Complete TCR Europe Touring Car Series results ===
(key) (Races in bold indicate pole position) (Races in italics indicate fastest lap)

Year	Team	Car	1	2	3	4	5	6	7	8	9	10	11	12	13	14	DC	Points
2018	Comtoyou Racing	Audi RS 3 LMS TCR	LEC; 1	LEC; 2	ZAN; 1	ZAN; 2	SPA; 1	SPA; 2	HUN; 1	HUN; 2	ASS; 1	ASS; 2	MNZ; 1	MNZ; 2	CAT; 1 Ret	CAT; 2 Ret	NC	0

Sporting positions
Preceded by Jean-Éric Vergne	French Formula Renault 2.0; Champion; 2009	Succeeded by None (Series ended)
Preceded by Eddy Bénézet	Andros Trophy Elite; Champion; 2016–17	Succeeded by Eddy Bénézet
