= Yann Ehrlacher =

French auto racing driver

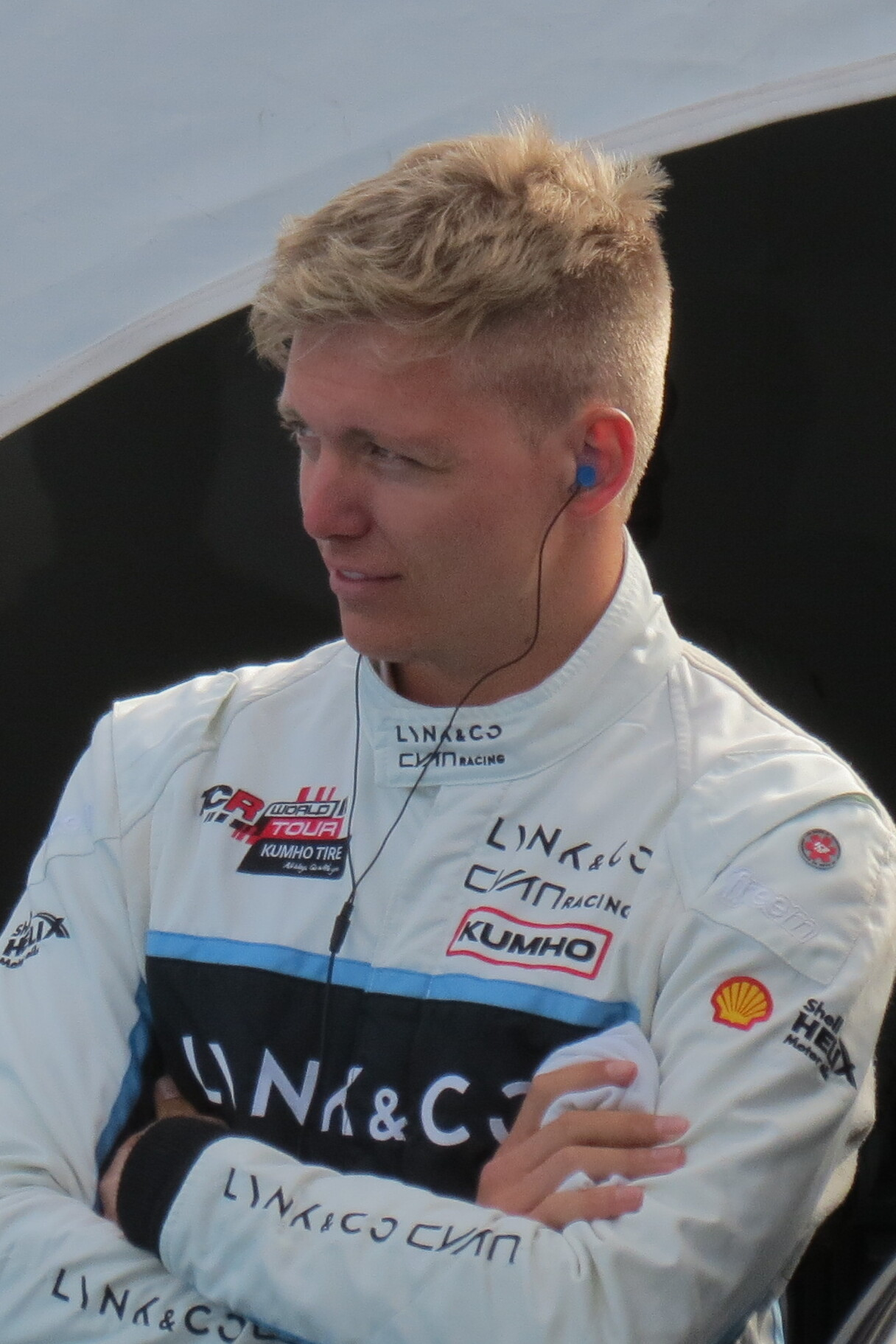
- Ehrlacher in 2023
- Nationality: (France) French
- Born: 4 June 1996 (age 30) Mulhouse, France
- Relatives: Yves Ehrlacher (father); Cathy Muller (mother); Yvan Muller (uncle)

World Touring Car Championship/World Touring Car Cup career
- Debut season: 2017
- Current team: Cyan Performance Lynk & Co
- Categorisation: FIA Silver (until 2021); FIA Gold (2022–)
- Car number: 68
- Former teams: RC Motorsport, ALL-INKL.COM Münnich Motorsport
- Starts: 20
- Wins: 6
- Poles: 1
- Fastest laps: 0
- Best finish: 1st in 2020, 2021, 2025

Previous series
- 2016–17 2015 2013–14: European Le Mans Series; Championnat de France de Supertourisme; Volkswagen Scirocco R-Cup

Championship titles
- 2025 2020-2021: TCR World Tour; World Touring Car Cup

Yann Ehrlacher (born 4 July 1996) is a French auto racing driver who competes in the TCR World Tour for Geely Cyan Racing. He was the 2020 World Touring Car Cup winner and defended the title in 2021. He is the son of former racing driver Cathy Muller and Yves Ehrlacher, a former professional footballer. He is also the nephew of Yvan Muller, quadruple winner of the World Touring Car Championship.

== Debut in motor sport ==
Unlike most drivers of his generation, Ehrlacher has never competed in karting. He made his motorsport debut in a Mitjet 1300 at the end of the 2012 season, where he already stood out for his speed.

== Racing record ==
=== Career summary ===
Season	Series	Team	Races	Wins	Poles	F/Laps	Podiums	Points	Position
2013	Volkswagen Scirocco R-Cup	N/A	9	0	0	0	0	123	14th
2014	Volkswagen Scirocco R-Cup	N/A	10	0	0	0	0	209	8th
2015	Championnat de France de Supertourisme	Yvan Muller Racing	28	12	6	22	23	1228	**1st**
2016	European Le Mans Series - LMP3	M.Racing - YMR	6	1	0	0	1	36	8th
2016	Road to Le Mans - LMP3	M.Racing - YMR	1	0	0	0	0	N/A	4th
2017	World Touring Car Championship	RC Motorsport	20	1	0	0	3	90	10th
2017	European Le Mans Series - LMP3	M.Racing - YMR	5	0	0	0	0	1	25th
2017	Le Mans Cup - LMP3	M.Racing - YMR	2	0	0	0	1	7	24th
2018	World Touring Car Cup	ALL-INKL.COM Münnich Motorsport	30	2	0	3	3	204	10th
2018	French GT4 Cup	M.Racing - YMR	6	0	0	0	0	14	22nd
2018–19	Andros Trophy - Électrique Class	Andros	2	0	0	0	2	57	10th
2019	World Touring Car Cup	Cyan Performance Lynk & Co	30	0	1	1	6	222	9th
2019	European Le Mans Series - LMP3	M Racing	3	0	1	0	0	7.5	19th
2019	Le Mans Cup - LMP3	M Racing	2	0	0	0	0	0	NC
2019–20	Andros Trophy - Elite Pro Class	Yvan Muller Racing	10	3	2	2	7	509	**3rd**
2020	World Touring Car Cup	Cyan Racing Lynk & Co	16	3	1	0	4	234	**1st**
2020–21	Andros Trophy - Elite Pro Class	M Racing	11	1	0	1	5	507	4th
2021	World Touring Car Cup	Cyan Racing Lynk & Co	16	2	1	1	4	223	**1st**
2021–22	Andros Trophy - Elite Pro Class	M Racing	9	2	2	1	5	537	**2nd**
2022	World Touring Car Cup	Cyan Racing Lynk & Co	8	0	0	0	2	133	9th
2022–23	Andros Trophy - Elite Pro Class	M Racing	10	1	1	1	4	505	5th
2023	TCR World Tour	Cyan Racing Lynk & Co	20	3	3	3	6	430	**2nd**
2023	TCR Europe Touring Car Series	Cyan Racing Lynk & Co	6	2	0	0	2	0	NC†
2023	TCR Italy Touring Car Championship	Cyan Racing Lynk & Co	2	0	0	0	1	0	NC†
2023	TCR South America Touring Car Championship	Cyan Racing Lynk & Co	4	0	0	0	1	0	NC†
2023	TCR Australia Touring Car Series	Cyan Racing Lynk & Co	6	1	0	0	1	0	NC†
2023	Ultimate Cup Series - Proto P3	M Racing	1	0	0	0	0	0	NC
2024	TCR World Tour	Cyan Racing Lynk & Co	14	3	2	3	5	287	5th
2024	TCR Italy Touring Car Championship	Cyan Racing Lynk & Co	2	0	0	0	1	0	NC†
2024	TCR South America Touring Car Championship	Cyan Racing Lynk & Co	4	1	1	3	1	36	31st
2025	TCR World Tour	Lynk & Co Cyan Racing	20	4	1	1	13	484	**1st**
2025	TCR Australia Touring Car Series	Lynk & Co Cyan Racing	4	0	0	0	2	0	NC†
2025–26	Asian Le Mans Series - LMP2	ARC Bratislava	6	0	0	0	0	4	17th
2026	TCR World Tour	Geely Cyan Racing	18	1	2	3	5	333	6th*

^{*} Season still in progress.

=== Complete European Le Mans Series results ===
Year	Team	Class	Car	Engine	1	2	3	4	5	6	Rank	Points
2016	M.Racing - YMR	LMP3	Ligier JS P3	Nissan VK50VE 5.0 L V8	SIL; Ret	IMO; 5	RBR; 10	LEC; Ret	SPA; Ret	EST; 1	8th	36
2017	M.Racing - YMR	LMP3	Norma M30	Nissan VK50VE 5.0 L V8	SIL; 10	MNZ	RBR; Ret	LEC; Ret	SPA; Ret	ALG; Ret	25th	1
2019	M Racing	LMP3	Norma M30	Nissan VK50VE 5.0 L V8	LEC; 9	MNZ	CAT; 11	**SIL**; 8	SPA	ALG	19th	7.5

=== Complete World Touring Car Championship results ===
(key) (Races in bold indicate pole position) (Races in italics indicate fastest lap)

Year	Team	Car	1	2	3	4	5	6	7	8	9	10	11	12	13	14	15	16	17	18	19	20	DC	Points
2017	RC Motorsport	Lada Vesta WTCC	MAR; 1 Ret	MAR; 2; 12	ITA; 1; 11	ITA; 2; 9	HUN; 1; 8	HUN; 2; 8	GER; 1; 9	GER; 2; 9	POR; 1; 9	POR; 2; 11	**ARG**; **1**; 1	ARG; 2; 8	**CHN**; **1**; 2	CHN; 2; 8	JPN; 1; 2	JPN; 2; 7	MAC; 1; 12	MAC; 2; 14	QAT; 1; 13	QAT; 2; 12	10th	90

=== Complete World Touring Car Cup results ===
(key) (Races in bold indicate pole position) (Races in italics indicate fastest lap)

Year	Team	Car	1	2	3	4	5	6	7	8	9	10	11	12	13	14	15	16	17	18	19	20	21	22	23	24	25	26	27	28	29	30	DC	Points
2018	ALL-INKL.COM Münnich Motorsport	Honda Civic Type R TCR	MAR; 1; 7	MAR; 2; 4	MAR; 3; 4	HUN; 1; 1	HUN; 2 Ret	HUN; 3; 4	GER; 1; 19	GER; 2; 6	GER; 3 Ret	NED; 1; 1	NED; 2; 2	NED; 3; 6	POR; 1 Ret	POR; 2; 7	POR; 3; 7	SVK; 1; 6	SVK; 2; 9	SVK; 3; 14	CHN; 1; 8	CHN; 2; 18†	CHN; 3; 19	WUH; 1; 18	WUH; 2; 15	WUH; 3; 12	JPN; 1 Ret	JPN; 2; 9	JPN; 3 Ret	MAC; 1; 14	MAC; 2; 6	MAC; 3; 5	10th	204
2019	Cyan Performance Lynk & Co	Lynk & Co 03 TCR	MAR; 1; 8	MAR; 2; 3	MAR; 3 Ret	HUN; 1 Ret	HUN; 2 Ret	HUN; 3; 3	SVK; 1; 22	SVK; 2; 17	SVK; 3; 20	NED; 1; 7	NED; 2; 8	**NED**; **3**; 2	GER; 1; 6	GER; 2 Ret	GER; 3 Ret	POR; 1; 2	POR; 2; 8	POR; 3; 3	CHN; 1; 13	CHN; 2; 14	CHN; 3; 2	JPN; 1; 12	JPN; 2; 15	JPN; 3; 19	MAC; 1; 8	MAC; 2; 6	MAC; 3; 8	MAL; 1; 14	MAL; 2; 7	MAL; 3; 16	9th	222
2020	Cyan Racing Lynk & Co	Lynk & Co 03 TCR	BEL; 1; 7	BEL; 2; 1	GER; 1; 3	GER; 2; 1	SVK; 1; 9	SVK; 2; 7	SVK; 3; 11	HUN; 1; 2	HUN; 2; 1	HUN; 3; 8	ESP; 1; 11	ESP; 2; 6	ESP; 3; 12	ARA; 1; 6	ARA; 2; 6	ARA; 3; 2															1st	234
2021	Cyan Racing Lynk & Co	Lynk & Co 03 TCR	GER; 1; 8	GER; 2; 10	POR; 1; 1	POR; 2; 6	ESP; 1; 5	ESP; 2; 7	HUN; 1; 3	HUN; 2; 4	CZE; 1; 3	CZE; 2; 4	FRA; 1; 8	FRA; 2; 5	ITA; 1; 8	**ITA**; **2**; 1	RUS; 1; 5	RUS; 2; 6															1st	223
2022	Cyan Racing Lynk & Co	Lynk & Co 03 TCR	FRA; 1; 4	FRA; 2; 15	GER; 1 C	GER; 2 C	HUN; 1; 2	HUN; 2; 6	ESP; 1; 5	ESP; 2; 5	POR; 1; 2	POR; 2; 8	ITA; 1 DNS	ITA; 2 DNS	ALS; 1 WD	ALS; 2 WD	BHR; 1	BHR; 2	SAU; 1	SAU; 2													9th	133

^{†} Driver did not finish the race, but was classified as he completed over 90% of the race distance.

=== Complete TCR World Tour results ===
(key) (Races in bold indicate pole position) (Races in italics indicate fastest lap)

Year	Team	Car	1	2	3	4	5	6	7	8	9	10	11	12	13	14	15	16	17	18	19	20	21	DC	Points
2023	Cyan Racing Lynk & Co	Lynk & Co 03 FL TCR	ALG; 1; 7	ALG; 2; 7	**SPA**; **1**; 1	SPA; 2; 5	VAL; 1; 5	VAL; 2; 2	**HUN**; **1**; 1	HUN; 2; 6	ELP; 1; 5	ELP; 2; 3	**VIL**; **1**; 6	VIL; 2; 16†	SYD; 1; 6	SYD; 2; 9	SYD; 3; 7	BAT; 1; 4	BAT; 2; 5	BAT; 3; 1	MAC; 1; 6	MAC; 2; 3		2nd	430
2024	Cyan Racing Lynk & Co	Lynk & Co 03 FL TCR	VAL; 1; 2^{2}	VAL; 2; 14	**MRK**; **1**; 1^{1}	MRK; 2 Ret	MOH; 1; 6	MOH; 2; 1	SAP; 1; 4^{3}	SAP; 2; 20	**ELP**; **1**; 1^{1}	ELP; 2; 21	ZHZ; 1; 4^{3}	ZHZ; 2; 3	MAC; 1; 4^{3}	MAC; 2; 10								5th	287
2025	Lynk & Co Cyan Racing	Lynk & Co 03 FL TCR	AHR; 1; 3	AHR; 2; 2	AHR; 3; 16	CRT; 1; 1	CRT; 2; 3	CRT; 3; 1	MNZ; 1; 2	MNZ; 2; 9	**CVR**; **1**; 1	CVR; 2; 8	BEN; 1 C	BEN; 2; 3	BEN; 3; 6	INJ; 1; 4	INJ; 2; 2	INJ; 3; 2	ZHZ; 1; 5	ZHZ; 2; 1	ZHZ; 3; 3	MAC; 1; 3	MAC; 2; 11	1st	484
2026	Geely Cyan Racing	Geely Preface TCR	MIS; 1; 3	MIS; 2; 5	**CRT**; **1** Ret	CRT; 2 Ret	CRT; 3; 7	LEC; 1; 2	LEC; 2; 6	CVR; 1; 1	CVR; 2; 5	INJ; 1; 6	INJ; 2 Ret	INJ; 3; 4	**CHE**; **1**; 2	CHE; 2; 8	CHE; 3; 2	ZHZ; 1; 14	ZHZ; 2; 12	ZHZ; 3; 4	MAC; 1	MAC; 2		6th*	333*

^{†} Driver did not finish the race, but was classified as he completed over 90% of the race distance. ^{*} Season still in progress.

=== Complete TCR Europe Touring Car Series results ===
(key) (Races in bold indicate pole position) (Races in italics indicate fastest lap)

Year	Team	Car	1	2	3	4	5	6	7	8	9	10	11	12	13	14	DC	Points
2023	Cyan Racing Lynk & Co	Lynk & Co 03 FL TCR	ALG; 1; 7	ALG; 2; 7	PAU; 1	PAU; 2	SPA; 1; 1	SPA; 2; 5	HUN; 1; 1	HUN; 2; 6	LEC; 1	LEC; 2	MNZ; 1	MNZ; 2	CAT; 1	CAT; 2	NC‡	0‡

^{‡} Driver was a World Tour full-time entry and was ineligible for points.

=== Complete Asian Le Mans Series results ===
(key) (Races in bold indicate pole position) (Races in italics indicate fastest lap)

Year	Team	Class	Car	Engine	1	2	3	4	5	6	Pos.	Points
2025–26	ARC Bratislava	LMP2	Oreca 07	Gibson GK428 4.2 L V8	SEP; 1; 10	SEP; 2; 10	DUB; 1 Ret	DUB; 2; 9	ABU; 1 Ret	ABU; 2 Ret	17th	4

Sporting positions
Preceded by Soheil Ayari (2005)	Championnat de France de Supertourisme; Champion; 2015	Succeeded by Antoine Jung
Preceded by Norbert Michelisz	World Touring Car Cup; Champion; 2020-2021	Succeeded by Mikel Azcona
Preceded by Norbert Michelisz	TCR World Tour; Champion; 2025	Succeeded by Incumbent
