= Néstor Girolami =

Argentine racing driver

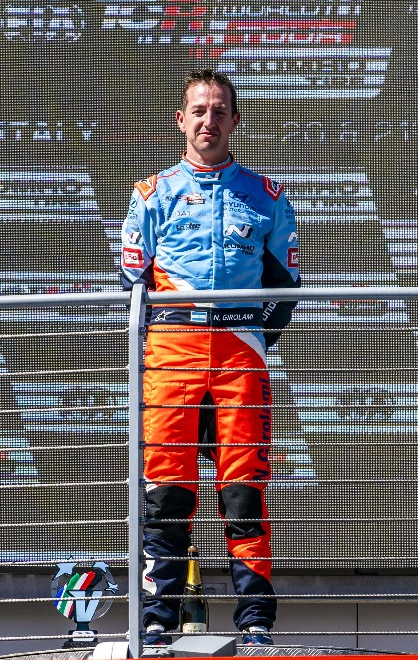
- Girolami in 2024
- Nationality: (Argentina) Argentine
- Born: Néstor Adrián Girolami; 22 May 1989 (age 37) Isla Verde, Cordoba Province, Argentina
- Relatives: Franco Girolami (brother)

World Touring Car Championship, World Touring Car Cup & TCR World Tour career
- Debut season: 2015
- Current team: BRC Hyundai N Squadra Corse
- Categorisation: FIA Gold
- Car number: 129
- Former teams: Münnich Motorsport; Polestar Cyan Racing; Nika International; ALM Motorsport; Squadra Martino; Wall Racing
- Starts: 115
- Wins: 9
- Podiums: 22
- Poles: 9
- Fastest laps: 4
- Best finish: 2nd in 2022

Championship titles
- 2014-2015: Súper TC 2000

Néstor Adrián Girolami (born May 22, 1989), also known by the nickname "Bebu", is an Argentine racing driver.

His brother Franco is also racing driver.

== Career ==
Girolami began competing in karts in 1993. He remained in this discipline until 2005. The following year, he made his debut in Formula Renault Argentina and the next he was runner-up, as well as in Formula Renault Plus.

Girolami made his debut in TC 2000 in 2007, racing in one of his participations with the official Honda Argentina team.

In 2008, it went to TC Pista and Turismo Nacional and in 2009 it returned to TC 2000 and debuted in Turismo Carretera and Top Race V6.

In the 2011 Turismo Carretera season, Girolami achieved his first victory and qualified for the play-off. But in the penultimate race, he was involved in Guido Falaschi's fatal accident. Another serious accident in 2013 caused his suspension and subsequent separation from this series.

After competing with the official teams of the national subsidiaries of Honda and Renault in TC 2000, he joined the Peugeot team in the 2012 season of the series. That year, he achieved two victories and in 2014 and 2015 he would win the championships with a total of seven victories. After this, he left the championship to carry out the full season of Stock Car Brasil.

Girolami made his World Touring Car Championship debut at the Race of Slovakia in 2015 in a Honda Civic WTCC run by NIKA International, scoring points on his debut with a tenth-place finish. He competed in the 2017 World Touring Car Championship for Polestar Cyan Racing and took his first win in China. The team left the series after the season and Girolami returned to Súper TC 2000 and Top Race V6 in 2018. In TRV6, he finished third in the championship, behind his brother Franco and Agustín Canapino.

For 2019, Girolami moved to the World Touring Car Cup to compete in a Honda Civic Type R TCR run by Münnich Motorsport. The 2019 season saw him take three wins, including two in a row in Hungary.

== Racing record ==
=== Complete Stock Car Brasil results ===
Year	Team	Car	1	2	3	4	5	6	7	8	9	10	11	12	13	14	15	16	17	18	19	20	21	Rank	Pts.
2015	Eurofarma RC	Chevrolet Sonic	GOI; 1; 1	RBP; 1	RBP; 2	VEL; 1	VEL; 2	CUR; 1	CUR; 2	SCZ; 1	SCZ; 2	CUR; 1	CUR; 2	GOI; 1	CAS; 1	CAS; 2	MOU; 1	MOU; 2	CUR; 1	CUR; 2	TAR; 1	TAR; 2		NC‡	0‡
2015	Schin Racing Team	Peugeot 408																					INT; 1; 12	NC‡	0‡
2016	Eisenbahn Racing Team	Peugeot 408	CUR; 1 Ret	VEL; 1; 21	VEL; 2; 15	GOI; 1 Ret	GOI; 2; 10	SCZ; 1 Ret	SCZ; 2 DNS	TAR; 1 Ret	TAR; 2 Ret	CAS; 1; 11	CAS; 2 Ret	INT; 1; 16	LON; 1; 10	**LON**; **2** Ret	CUR; 1; 16	CUR; 2; 8	GOI; 1; 8	GOI; 2; 23†	CRI; 1 Ret	CRI; 2; 9	INT; 1 Ret	22nd	77
2018	Bardahl Hot Car	Chevrolet Cruze	INT; 1	CUR; 1	CUR; 2	VEL; 1	VEL; 2	LON; 1	LON; 2	SCZ; 1	SCZ; 2	GOI; 1	MOU; 1; 18	MOU; 2; 14	CAS; 1 Ret	CAS; 2 Ret	VCA; 1	VCA; 2	TAR; 1	TAR; 2	GOI; 1	GOI; 2	INT; 1	NC‡	0‡

^{‡} Ineligible for championship points. ^{†} Driver did not finish the race, but was classified as he completed over 90% of the race distance.

=== Complete World Touring Car Championship results ===
(key) (Races in bold indicate pole position) (Races in italics indicate fastest lap)

Year	Team	Car	1	2	3	4	5	6	7	8	9	10	11	12	13	14	15	16	17	18	19	20	21	22	23	24	DC	Points
2015	Nika International	Honda Civic WTCC	ARG; 1	ARG; 2	MAR; 1	MAR; 2	HUN; 1	HUN; 2	GER; 1	GER; 2	RUS; 1	RUS; 2	SVK; 1; 10	SVK; 2; 11	FRA; 1	FRA; 2	POR; 1 DSQ	POR; 2; 8	JPN; 1	JPN; 2	CHN; 1	CHN; 2	THA; 1	THA; 2	QAT; 1	QAT; 2	19th	5
2016	Polestar Cyan Racing	Volvo S60 Polestar TC1	FRA; 1	FRA; 2	SVK; 1	SVK; 2	HUN; 1	HUN; 2	MAR; 1	MAR; 2	GER; 1	GER; 2	RUS; 1	RUS; 2	POR; 1	POR; 2	ARG; 1	ARG; 2	JPN; 1; 9	JPN; 2; 5	CHN; 1	CHN; 2	QAT; 1	QAT; 2			15th	12
2017	Polestar Cyan Racing	Volvo S60 Polestar TC1	MAR; 1; 9	MAR; 2; 3	ITA; 1 NC	ITA; 2; 5	HUN; 1; 4	HUN; 2 Ret	**GER**; **1** Ret	GER; 2 DNS	POR; 1; 8	POR; 2; 9	ARG; 1; 16	ARG; 2; 6	CHN; 1 Ret	**CHN**; **2**; 1‡	JPN; 1; 11	JPN; 2; 3	MAC; 1; 13	MAC; 2; 9	QAT; 1	QAT; 2					9th	112

^{‡} Half points awarded as less than 75% of race distance was completed.

=== Complete World Touring Car Cup results ===
(key) (Races in bold indicate pole position) (Races in italics indicate fastest lap)

Year	Team	Car	1	2	3	4	5	6	7	8	9	10	11	12	13	14	15	16	17	18	19	20	21	22	23	24	25	26	27	28	29	30	DC	Points
2019	ALL-INKL.COM Münnich Motorsport	Honda Civic Type R TCR	MAR; 1; 3	MAR; 2; 10	MAR; 3; 6	**HUN**; **1**; 1	HUN; 2; 1	HUN; 3; 6	SVK; 1 Ret	SVK; 2; 1	SVK; 3; 24	NED; 1; 14	NED; 2; 10	NED; 3; 14	GER; 1; 3	GER; 2; 24	GER; 3; 18	POR; 1; 10	POR; 2; 9	POR; 3; 6	CHN; 1; 15	CHN; 2 Ret	CHN; 3; 8	JPN; 1; 18	JPN; 2; 11	JPN; 3; 12	MAC; 1; 14	MAC; 2; 19	MAC; 3; 17	MAL; 1; 22	MAL; 2; 4	MAL; 3; 5	7th	225
2020	ALL-INKL.COM Münnich Motorsport	Honda Civic Type R TCR	**BEL**; **1**; 1	BEL; 2; 5	GER; 1; 6	**GER**; **2**; 11	SVK; 1; 5	**SVK**; **2**; 18†	SVK; 3 DNS	HUN; 1; 3	HUN; 2 Ret	HUN; 3; 3	ESP; 1; 10	ESP; 2; 11	ESP; 3 Ret	ARA; 1; 2	ARA; 2 Ret	ARA; 3 DNS															10th	137
2021	ALL-INKL.COM Münnich Motorsport	Honda Civic Type R TCR	GER; 1; 9	GER; 2; 3	POR; 1 Ret	POR; 2; 13	ESP; 1; 18	ESP; 2; 12	HUN; 1; 9	HUN; 2; 5	CZE; 1; 1	CZE; 2; 16	FRA; 1; 5	FRA; 2 Ret	ITA; 1; 8	ITA; 2 NC	RUS; 1; 11	RUS; 2; 7															11th	131
2022	ALL-INKL.COM Münnich Motorsport	Honda Civic Type R TCR	**FRA**; **1**; 1	FRA; 2; 7	GER; 1 C	GER; 2 C	HUN; 1; 7	HUN; 2; 3	ESP; 1; 12	ESP; 2; 12	POR; 1; 3	POR; 2; 9	**ITA**; **1**; 1	ITA; 2; 5	**ALS**; **1**; 2	ALS; 2; 7	BHR; 1; 4	BHR; 2; 9	SAU; 1; 10	SAU; 2; 8													2nd	254

^{†} Driver did not finish the race, but was classified as he completed over 90% of the race distance.

=== Complete TCR Europe Touring Car Series results ===
(key) (Races in bold indicate pole position) (Races in italics indicate fastest lap)

Year	Team	Car	1	2	3	4	5	6	7	8	9	10	11	12	13	14	DC	Points
2020	PSS Racing Team	Honda Civic Type R TCR (FK8)	LEC; 1; 5^{4}	LEC; 2; 2	ZOL; 1	ZOL; 2	MNZ; 1	MNZ; 2	CAT; 1	CAT; 2	SPA; 1	SPA; 2	JAR; 1	JAR; 2			17th	66
2023	ALM Motorsport	Honda Civic Type R TCR (FL5)	ALG; 1; 5	ALG; 2 Ret	PAU; 1	PAU; 2	SPA; 1; 2	SPA; 2; 7	HUN; 1; 2	HUN; 2; 5	LEC; 1	LEC; 2	MNZ; 1	MNZ; 2	CAT; 1	CAT; 2	NC‡	0‡

^{‡} Driver was a World Tour full-time entry and was ineligible for points.

=== 24 Hours of Nürburgring results ===
Year	Team	Co-drivers	Car	Class	Laps	Pos.	Class pos.
2021	Team Castrol Honda Racing	(Germany) Dominik Fugel (Portugal) Tiago Monteiro (Germany) Cedrik Totz	Honda Civic Type R TCR (FK8)	TCR	53	43rd	**3rd**

=== Complete TCR World Tour results ===
(key) (Races in bold indicate pole position) (Races in italics indicate fastest lap)

Year	Team	Car	1	2	3	4	5	6	7	8	9	10	11	12	13	14	15	16	17	18	19	20	21	DC	Points
2023	ALM Motorsport	Honda Civic Type R TCR (FL5)	ALG; 1; 5	ALG; 2 Ret	SPA; 1; 2	SPA; 2; 7	VAL; 1; 6	VAL; 2; 8	HUN; 1; 2	HUN; 2; 5														6th	340
2023	Squadra Martino Racing	Honda Civic Type R TCR (FL5)									ELP; 1; 4	ELP; 2; 8	VIL; 1 Ret	VIL; 2; 1										6th	340
2023	Wall Racing	Honda Civic Type R TCR (FL5)													SYD; 1; 10	SYD; 2 Ret	SYD; 3; 8	BAT; 1; 2	BAT; 2; 9	BAT; 3; 6				6th	340
2023	MacPro Racing	Honda Civic Type R TCR (FL5)																			MAC; 1; 2	MAC; 2; 6		6th	340
2024	BRC Hyundai N Squadra Corse	Hyundai Elantra N TCR	VAL; 1; 10	VAL; 2; 1	MRK; 1; 4^{4}	MRK; 2; 5	MOH; 1; 4^{6}	MOH; 2; 8	SAP; 1; 13^{5}	SAP; 2; 11	ELP; 1; 5^{4}	ELP; 2; 8	ZHZ; 1; 8	ZHZ; 2; 2	MAC; 1; 5^{5}	MAC; 2; 7								6th	238
2025	BRC Hyundai N Squadra Corse	Hyundai Elantra N TCR	AHR; 1; 11	AHR; 2; 11	AHR; 3; 13	CRT; 1; 6	CRT; 2; 1	CRT; 3; 3	MNZ; 1; 6	MNZ; 2; 2	CVR; 1; 8	CVR; 2; 10	BEN; 1 C	BEN; 2; 10	BEN; 3; 1	INJ; 1; 17	INJ; 2; 10	INJ; 3; 15	ZHZ; 1; 9	ZHZ; 2; 3	ZHZ; 3; 7	**MAC**; **1**; 1	MAC; 2; 6	6th	299

Sporting positions
Preceded by Mariano Werner; Esteban Guerrieri	Winner of the 200 km de Buenos Aires; 2014; With: Mauro Giallombardo	Succeeded by Matías Rossi; Gabriel Ponce de León
Preceded by Matías Rossi	Súper TC 2000; Champion; 2014–2015	Succeeded by Agustín Canapino
