= 2020 World Touring Car Cup =

Motorsport contest

Champions
- Drivers' Champion: Yann Ehrlacher
- Teams' Champion: Cyan Racing Lynk & Co

Seasons
- ← 2019 2021 →

The 2020 World Touring Car Cup was the third season of the World Touring Car Cup and 16th overall of the series, which dates back to the 2005 World Touring Car Championship.

The drivers' championship was won by Yann Ehrlacher. The teams' championship was won by Cyan Racing Lynk & Co.

== Teams and drivers ==
Team	Car	No.	Drivers	Class	Rounds	Ref.
(Italy) BRC Hyundai N Lukoil Squadra Corse	Hyundai i30 N TCR	1	(Hungary) Norbert Michelisz		1, 3–6	
(Italy) BRC Hyundai N Lukoil Squadra Corse	Hyundai i30 N TCR	30	(Italy) Gabriele Tarquini		1, 3–6	
(Switzerland) Vuković Motorsport	Renault Mégane R.S. Evo TCR	7	(United Kingdom) Jack Young	R T	1–2	
(Switzerland) Vuković Motorsport	Renault Mégane R.S. Evo TCR	34	(France) Aurélien Comte	T	3–6	
(Germany) Hyundai N Liqui Moly Racing Team Engstler	Hyundai i30 N TCR	8	(Germany) Luca Engstler	R	1, 3–6	
(Germany) Hyundai N Liqui Moly Racing Team Engstler	Hyundai i30 N TCR	27	(Malaysia) Mitchell Cheah	R	6	
(Germany) Hyundai N Liqui Moly Racing Team Engstler	Hyundai i30 N TCR	40	(United Kingdom) Josh Files		5	
(Germany) Hyundai N Liqui Moly Racing Team Engstler	Hyundai i30 N TCR	88	(Netherlands) Nicky Catsburg		1, 3	
(Germany) Hyundai N Liqui Moly Racing Team Engstler	Hyundai i30 N TCR	97	(Austria) Nico Gruber	R	4	
(Germany) ALL-INKL.DE Münnich Motorsport	Honda Civic Type R TCR (FK8)	9	(Hungary) Attila Tassi		All	
(Germany) ALL-INKL.DE Münnich Motorsport	Honda Civic Type R TCR (FK8)	18	(Portugal) Tiago Monteiro		All	
(Germany) ALL-INKL.COM Münnich Motorsport	Honda Civic Type R TCR (FK8)	29	(Argentina) Néstor Girolami		All	
(Germany) ALL-INKL.COM Münnich Motorsport	Honda Civic Type R TCR (FK8)	86	(Argentina) Esteban Guerrieri		All	
(Sweden) Cyan Performance Lynk & Co	Lynk & Co 03 TCR	11	(Sweden) Thed Björk		All	
(Sweden) Cyan Performance Lynk & Co	Lynk & Co 03 TCR	12	(Uruguay) Santiago Urrutia		All	
(Sweden) Cyan Racing Lynk & Co	Lynk & Co 03 TCR	68	(France) Yann Ehrlacher		All	
(Sweden) Cyan Racing Lynk & Co	Lynk & Co 03 TCR	100	(France) Yvan Muller		All	
(Belgium) Comtoyou Racing	Audi RS 3 LMS TCR	16	(Belgium) Gilles Magnus	R T	All	
(Belgium) Audi Sport Team Comtoyou DHL	Audi RS 3 LMS TCR	17	(France) Nathanaël Berthon	T	All	
(Belgium) Audi Sport Team Comtoyou DHL	Audi RS 3 LMS TCR	31	(Netherlands) Tom Coronel	T	All	
(Hungary) Zengő Motorsport Services KFT	CUPRA León Competición TCR	55	(Hungary) Bence Boldizs	R T	All	
(Hungary) Zengő Motorsport Services KFT	CUPRA León Competición TCR	96	(Spain) Mikel Azcona		All	
(Hungary) Zengő Motorsport Services KFT	CUPRA León Competición TCR	99	(Hungary) Gábor Kismarty-Lechner	T	All	
(Italy) Team Mulsanne	Alfa Romeo Giulietta Veloce TCR	69	(France) Jean-Karl Vernay	T	All	
Wildcard entries
(Belgium) Comtoyou Racing	Audi RS 3 LMS TCR	15	(Belgium) Nicolas Baert		5	
(Czech Republic) Vexta Domy	CUPRA León Competición TCR	22	(Czech Republic) Petr Fulín		3	
(Italy) Team Mulsanne	Alfa Romeo Giulietta Veloce TCR	25	(Italy) Luca Filippi		1, 3–4, 6	
(Italy) Target Competition	Hyundai i30 N TCR	28	(Argentina) José Manuel Sapag		4, 6	
(Switzerland) Vuković Motorsport	Renault Mégane R.S. Evo TCR	33	(Australia) Dylan O'Keeffe		1	

Icon	Class
R	Eligible for FIA Rookie award
T	Eligible for WTCR Trophy

=== Summary ===
JAS Motorsport and Honda Racing retained their 2019 drivers – Attila Tassi, Tiago Monteiro, Néstor Girolami and Esteban Guerrieri – for the 2020 season. On 5 March it was announced that all four drivers would compete for Münnich Motorsport, which would expand from two cars last season. To meet series regulations the team was split into two entities – ALL-INKL.DE Münnich Motorsport and ALL-INKL.COM Münnich Motorsport – with driver pairings yet to be confirmed. On 2 June it was announced that Attila Tassi and Tiago Monteiro would join the ALL-INKL.DE Münnich Motorsport with Néstor Girolami and Esteban Guerrieri remaining at the ALL-INKL.COM Münnich Motorsport.

Volkswagen Motorsport announced that it would cease manufacturer support for the Golf GTI TCR along with all petrol-powered motorsport programmes, though the Golf GTI TCR would still be available to private teams. This announcement came along with the shift of the brand's policy towards electric racing. Sébastien Loeb Racing, which had run four Golf GTI TCR cars during the 2019 season, announced on 31 January 2020 that it would leave the series.

Audi opted not to introduce a successor to the RS 3 LMS for 2020, while also ending their manufacturer support in the series, though the RS 3 LMS would still be available to private teams. Days before the announcement, W Racing Team, competing under the Audi Sport Team Leopard Racing banner, announced that it would cease participation in the series after the 2019 season to focus on their racing programmes in GT racing and the Deutsche Tourenwagen Masters.

Tom Coronel remained with Comtoyou Racing, but switched from the Cupra León TCR to the Audi RS 3 LMS TCR. Nathanaël Berthon returned to the WTCR driving for Comtoyou Racing.

Cyan Racing committed to run four Lynk & Co 03 TCR cars for the season. On 26 March Yann Ehrlacher and Yvan Muller were confirmed as drivers for Cyan Racing Lynk & Co.

Hyundai was again represented by four Hyundai i30 N TCR entries. BRC Racing Team scaled down to two cars after fielding all four entries last year, and entered under the BRC Hyundai N Lukoil Squadra Corse banner with reigning champion Norbert Michelisz and Gabriele Tarquini. Engstler Motorsport returned to the series for the first time since the 2014 season (back when it was called the World Touring Car Championship) fielding the remaining two Hyundai cars under the Engstler Hyundai N Liqui Moly Racing Team name for Luca Engstler —who made his full-season début after entering once as a wildcard entry for the 2019 season as well as being replacement for Augusto Farfus at the Macau race weekend last year— and Nicky Catsburg. With these changes, Farfus left the team.

SEAT Cupra announced on 3 April 2020 that they would not offer manufacturer support to any team in the 2020 Championship, though the new León Competición TCR would still be available to private teams. On 14 May 2020, it was announced that the Cupra Leon Competición TCR would compete in the championship, with teams and drivers yet to be named. On 30 May 2020, it was announced that Zengő Motorsport would return to the WTCR, running two new León Competición TCR cars, for Bence Boldizs and a yet-to-be-named driver. It was announced on 28 August that he would be joined by Mikel Azcona and Gábor Kismarty-Lechner in a three-car lineup.

Jean-Karl Vernay switched from W Racing Team to Team Mulsanne, which run a single Alfa Romeo Giulietta Veloce TCR.

Vuković Motorsport joined the grid running a single Renault Mégane R.S. TCR for Jack Young. Aurélien Comte later replaced Young from the Slovakia Race onwards, thereby switching from DG Sport Compétition to Vuković Motorsport.

== Calendar ==
A provisional calendar was released on 5 December 2019.

The 2020 championship was contested over 16 races in six rounds in Europe. The season was originally planned to be contested over 20 races in 10 rounds, but this changed due to the COVID-19 pandemic.

Round	Race	Race name	Circuit	Date	Supporting
1	1	Oscaro Race of Belgium	(Belgium) The Circuit Terlamen Zolder, Heusden-Zolder	12 September	TCR Europe Touring Car Series; Cup & Tourenwagen Trophy; Dutch Truck Racing Championship
1	2	Oscaro Race of Belgium	(Belgium) The Circuit Terlamen Zolder, Heusden-Zolder	13 September	TCR Europe Touring Car Series; Cup & Tourenwagen Trophy; Dutch Truck Racing Championship
2	3	DHL Race of Germany	(Germany) Nürburgring Nordschleife, Nürburg	24 September	24 Hours Nürburgring; ADAC Formula 4 Championship
2	4	DHL Race of Germany	(Germany) Nürburgring Nordschleife, Nürburg	25 September	24 Hours Nürburgring; ADAC Formula 4 Championship
3	5	Race of Slovakia	Automotodróm Slovakia Ring, Dunajská Streda District	10 October	FIA Swift Cup Europe; Inter Cars Mazda MX-5 Cup
3	6	Race of Slovakia	Automotodróm Slovakia Ring, Dunajská Streda District	11 October	FIA Swift Cup Europe; Inter Cars Mazda MX-5 Cup
3	7	Race of Slovakia	Automotodróm Slovakia Ring, Dunajská Streda District	11 October	FIA Swift Cup Europe; Inter Cars Mazda MX-5 Cup
4	8	Oscaro Race of Hungary	(Hungary) Hungaroring, Mogyoród	17 October	FIA European Truck Racing Championship
4	9	Oscaro Race of Hungary	(Hungary) Hungaroring, Mogyoród	18 October	FIA European Truck Racing Championship
4	10	Oscaro Race of Hungary	(Hungary) Hungaroring, Mogyoród	18 October	FIA European Truck Racing Championship
5	11	Race of Spain	(Spain) MotorLand Aragón, Alcañiz	31 October	F4 Spanish Championship; Renault Clio Cup Spain
5	12	Race of Spain	(Spain) MotorLand Aragón, Alcañiz	1 November	F4 Spanish Championship; Renault Clio Cup Spain
5	13	Race of Spain	(Spain) MotorLand Aragón, Alcañiz	1 November	F4 Spanish Championship; Renault Clio Cup Spain
6	14	Race of Aragón	(Aragon) MotorLand Aragón, Alcañiz	14 November	Pure ETCR (presentation event)
6	15	Race of Aragón	(Aragon) MotorLand Aragón, Alcañiz	15 November	Pure ETCR (presentation event)
6	16	Race of Aragón	(Aragon) MotorLand Aragón, Alcañiz	15 November	Pure ETCR (presentation event)

Cancelled due to the COVID-19 pandemic
Race	Race name	Circuit	Original date	Original supporting	Notes
Race of Morocco		(Morocco) Circuit International Automobile Moulay El Hassan	5 April		
Race of Portugal		(Portugal) Circuito Internacional de Vila Real	21 June		
Race of China		(China) Ningbo International Circuit	6 September		
Race of Austria		(Austria) Salzburgring	12 September		
Race of Korea		(South Korea) Inje Speedium	18 October	Pure ETCR (demo event)	
Race of Italy		(Italy) Adria International Raceway	15 November	Pure ETCR (demo event)	
2020	Guia Race of Macau	Guia Circuit, Macau	22 November	2020 F3 Macau Grand Prix	The 2020 edition was instead held as part of the 2020 China TCR championship, supporting the 2020 China F4 championship Macau GP
Race of Malaysia		(Malaysia) Sepang International Circuit, Sepang	13 December		

== Rule changes ==
=== Technical changes ===
- Compensation weight was measured differently compared to the previous season with now only the qualifying laps counted. Previously a combination of both the qualifying and race laps was used to determine the compensation weight. The change came to avoid teams instructing drivers to set slower race laps. The Balance of Performance parameters for the cars remains unaffected.
- Goodyear became the series' tyre supplier, replacing Yokohama after a fourteen-year tenure as Yokohama elected to concentrate on developing tyres for the Super Formula and Super GT championships. Teams had a set of 18 new tyres for the opening round of the season, with the number being decreased to 12 for the remaining rounds.

=== Sporting changes ===
- For the first time since the 2010 World Touring Car Championship, a rookie category was introduced in the series. Drivers under the age of 23 were eligible as long as they had not raced in more than three race weekends in the series prior to this season.
- The three-race schedule that had been in use for the previous two seasons, was cut down to two, citing cost-cutting measures, reducing the number of races from thirty to twenty. As a result, only a single qualifying session would be held. The race length for Race 2 would be three laps longer than Race 1 as a direct result of the reduced number of events. After just two rounds the series reverted to the three race format from the Race of Slovakia onwards.
- Teams running two cars were restricted to 12-man personnel with three-car teams allowed 18-man personnel. The number of personnel working on the cars, wearing designated armbands, was restricted to ten. In light of the economical situation caused by the COVID-19 pandemic, teams were allowed to enter just one car for the 2020 season, though they would not be eligible to score points in the teams' championship.
- The WTCR Trophy was introduced for the 2020 season. Drivers who did not have financial support from customer racing department and haven't won the championship in either WTCR or its predecessor —the World Touring Car Championship— were allowed to score points in the WTCR Trophy.

== Results ==
Race	Race name	Pole position	Fastest lap	Winning driver	Winning team	Rookie Winner	WTCR Trophy Winner	Report
1	Race of Belgium		(Argentina) Néstor Girolami	(Argentina) Néstor Girolami	(Germany) ALL-INKL.COM Münnich Motorsport	(Belgium) Gilles Magnus	(Netherlands) Tom Coronel	Report
2	Race of Belgium	(France) Nathanaël Berthon	(France) Nathanaël Berthon	(France) Yann Ehrlacher	(Sweden) Cyan Racing Lynk & Co	(Belgium) Gilles Magnus	(Belgium) Gilles Magnus	Report
3	Race of Germany		(France) Yann Ehrlacher	(Argentina) Esteban Guerrieri	(Germany) ALL-INKL.COM Münnich Motorsport	(Belgium) Gilles Magnus	(Netherlands) Tom Coronel	Report
4	Race of Germany	(Argentina) Néstor Girolami	(France) Yann Ehrlacher	(France) Yann Ehrlacher	(Sweden) Cyan Racing Lynk & Co	(Hungary) Bence Boldizs	(France) Jean-Karl Vernay	Report
5	Race of Slovakia	(France) Nathanaël Berthon	(Sweden) Thed Björk	(France) Nathanaël Berthon	(Belgium) Comtoyou DHL Team Audi Sport	(Belgium) Gilles Magnus	(France) Nathanaël Berthon	Report
6	Race of Slovakia		(Spain) Mikel Azcona	(Netherlands) Tom Coronel	(Belgium) Comtoyou DHL Team Audi Sport	(Belgium) Gilles Magnus	(Netherlands) Tom Coronel	Report
7	Race of Slovakia	(France) Nathanaël Berthon	(Netherlands) Nicky Catsburg	(Netherlands) Nicky Catsburg	(Germany) Engstler Hyundai N Liqui Moly Racing Team	(Belgium) Gilles Magnus	(France) Nathanaël Berthon	Report
8	Race of Hungary	(Argentina) Esteban Guerrieri	(Hungary) Norbert Michelisz	(Argentina) Esteban Guerrieri	(Germany) ALL-INKL.COM Münnich Motorsport	(Germany) Luca Engstler	(France) Jean-Karl Vernay	Report
9	Race of Hungary		(Hungary) Norbert Michelisz	(France) Yann Ehrlacher	(Sweden) Cyan Racing Lynk & Co	(Hungary) Bence Boldizs	(France) Jean-Karl Vernay	Report
10	Race of Hungary	(Argentina) Esteban Guerrieri	(Portugal) Tiago Monteiro	(Argentina) Esteban Guerrieri	(Germany) ALL-INKL.COM Münnich Motorsport	(Belgium) Gilles Magnus	(France) Jean-Karl Vernay	Report
11	Race of Spain	(Hungary) Norbert Michelisz	(Belgium) Gilles Magnus	(France) Jean-Karl Vernay	(Italy) Team Mulsanne	(Belgium) Gilles Magnus	(France) Jean-Karl Vernay	Report
12	Race of Spain		(France) Nathanaël Berthon	(Spain) Mikel Azcona	(Hungary) Zengő Motorsport Services KFT	(Belgium) Gilles Magnus	(France) Nathanaël Berthon	Report
13	Race of Spain	(Belgium) Gilles Magnus	(Sweden) Thed Björk	(Sweden) Thed Björk	(Sweden) Cyan Performance Lynk & Co	(Belgium) Gilles Magnus	(France) Nathanaël Berthon	Report
14	(Aragon) Race of Aragón	(Uruguay) Santiago Urrutia	(Spain) Mikel Azcona	(Argentina) Esteban Guerrieri	(Germany) ALL-INKL.COM Münnich Motorsport	(Belgium) Gilles Magnus	(Belgium) Gilles Magnus	Report
15	(Aragon) Race of Aragón		(France) Yvan Muller	(France) Yvan Muller	(Sweden) Cyan Racing Lynk & Co	(Belgium) Gilles Magnus	(France) Jean-Karl Vernay	Report
16	(Aragon) Race of Aragón	(Uruguay) Santiago Urrutia	(Uruguay) Santiago Urrutia	(Uruguay) Santiago Urrutia	(Sweden) Cyan Performance Lynk & Co	(Belgium) Gilles Magnus	(France) Jean-Karl Vernay	Report

== Championship standings ==
Scoring system

Position	1st	2nd	3rd	4th	5th	6th	7th	8th	9th	10th	11th	12th	13th	14th	15th
Qualifying 1 & 3	5	4	3	2	1	—N/a									
Race	25	20	16	13	11	10	9	8	7	6	5	4	3	2	1

Scoring system for WTCR Trophy

Position	1st	2nd	3rd	4th	5th	FL
Qualifying 1	1	—N/a				
Race	10	8	5	3	1	1

=== Drivers' championship ===
Pos.	Driver	BEL (Belgium)		GER (Germany)		SVK (Slovakia)			HUN (Hungary)			ESP (Spain)			ARA (Aragon)			Pts.
1	(France) Yann Ehrlacher	7^{1}	1^{2}	3	1^{2}	9	7	11	2^{3}	1	8	11	6	12	6^{5}	6	2^{2}	234
2	(France) Yvan Muller	8^{4}	2^{5}	2	7	14	8	13	4	2	9	7	2	14	7^{4}	1	4	195
3	(France) Jean-Karl Vernay	5	7	9	6	3^{3}	14	4	9	3	5	1^{3}	Ret	6^{5}	8^{2}	2	3^{5}	194
4	(Argentina) Esteban Guerrieri	Ret	13	1	5	4	3	7	1^{1}	7	1^{1}	13	10	9	1	Ret	18	188
5	(Belgium) Gilles Magnus	10^{3}	4^{3}	7	Ret	7^{4}	2	3^{5}	15	10	14	3^{2}	8	5^{1}	3	4	9	172
6	(Uruguay) Santiago Urrutia	6	3^{4}	Ret	10	15	15	8	7	4	Ret	2	3	2^{3}	9^{1}	NC	1^{1}	169
7	(Spain) Mikel Azcona	16	11	Ret	4	8	4	5	6^{2}	Ret	4^{5}	4^{5}	1	7	5^{3}	3	5	168
8	(France) Nathanaël Berthon	9	14^{1}	12	12	1^{1}	Ret	2^{1}	12	11	11	12	4	4^{4}	4	NC	8^{3}	148
9	(Sweden) Thed Björk	2^{2}	Ret	4	2^{4}	19	16	15	10	12	12	Ret	7	1^{2}	11	7	6^{4}	142
10	(Argentina) Néstor Girolami	1	5	6	11^{1}	5	18†	DNS	3	Ret	3^{4}	10	11	Ret	2	Ret	DNS	137
11	(Netherlands) Tom Coronel	4^{5}	6	5	8^{5}	6	1	6^{4}	11	17	13	19†	Ret	8	12	15	15	117
12	(Hungary) Attila Tassi	3	20	Ret	3^{3}	11	Ret	DNS	5^{5}	8	6^{2}	17	13	Ret	10	8	10	100
13	(Hungary) Norbert Michelisz	11	8			10	6	10^{2}	21	5	10	6^{1}	15	16	16	5	7	93
14	(Italy) Gabriele Tarquini	15	15			2^{5}	Ret	Ret	NC	18	7	5^{4}	5	3	15	Ret	13	79
15	(Portugal) Tiago Monteiro	Ret	19	8	9	13	9	17†	14^{4}	9	2^{3}	14	12	Ret	20†	10	11	79
16	(Germany) Luca Engstler	12	10			NC	10	9	8	Ret	16	8	9	Ret	13	11	14	59
17	(Netherlands) Nicky Catsburg	14	9			17^{2}	5	1^{3}										53
18	(Hungary) Bence Boldizs	17	17	10	13	21†	13	NC	16	6	17	9	DNS	15	17	Ret	16	35
19	(France) Aurélien Comte					16	12	12	17	19†	19	Ret	NC	Ret	14	12	17	17
20	(Hungary) Gábor Kismarty-Lechner	19	18	11	14	20	17	16	19	16	21	18	17†	13	Ret	14	19	17
21	(United Kingdom) Josh Files											16	14	10				9
22	(Malaysia) Mitchell Cheah														18	13	20†	4
23	(Austria) Nico Gruber								18	14	20							3
24	(United Kingdom) Jack Young	20†	21†	Ret	DNS													0
Wildcard entries ineligible for points
–	(Italy) Luca Filippi	18	16			12	Ret	Ret	13	13	15				Ret	9	12	–
–	(Czech Republic) Petr Fulín					18	11	14										–
–	(Belgium) Nicolas Baert											15	16	11				–
–	(Australia) Dylan O'Keeffe	13	12															–
–	(Argentina) José Manuel Sapag								20	15	18				19	Ret	DNS	–
Pos.	Driver	BEL (Belgium)		GER (Germany)		SVK (Slovakia)			HUN (Hungary)			ESP (Spain)			ARA (Aragon)			Pts.

Colour	Result
Gold	Winner
Silver	Second place
Bronze	Third place
Green	Points classification
Blue	Non-points classification
Blue	Non-classified finish (NC)
Purple	Retired, not classified (Ret)
Red	Did not qualify (DNQ)
Red	Did not pre-qualify (DNPQ)
Black	Disqualified (DSQ)
White	Did not start (DNS)
White	Withdrew (WD)
White	Race cancelled (C)
Blank	Did not practice (DNP)
Blank	Did not arrive (DNA)
Blank	Excluded (EX)

† – Drivers did not finish the race, but were classified as they completed over 75% of the race distance.

=== Teams' championship ===
Pos.	Team	No.	BEL (Belgium)		GER (Germany)		SVK (Slovakia)			HUN (Hungary)			ESP (Spain)			ARA (Aragon)			Pts.
1	(Sweden) Cyan Racing Lynk & Co	68	7^{1}	1^{2}	3	1^{2}	9	7	11	2^{3}	1	8	11	6	12	6^{5}	6	2^{2}	429
1	(Sweden) Cyan Racing Lynk & Co	100	8^{4}	2^{5}	2	7	14	8	13	4	2	9	7	2	14	7^{4}	1	4	429
2	(Germany) ALL-INKL.COM Münnich Motorsport	29	1	5	6	11^{1}	5	18†	DNS	3	Ret	3^{4}	10	11	Ret	2	Ret	DNS	325
2	(Germany) ALL-INKL.COM Münnich Motorsport	86	Ret	13	1	5	4	3	7	1^{1}	7	1^{1}	13	10	9	1	Ret	18	325
3	(Sweden) Cyan Performance Lynk & Co	11	2^{2}	Ret	4	2^{4}	19	16	15	10	12	12	Ret	7	1^{2}	11	7	6^{4}	311
3	(Sweden) Cyan Performance Lynk & Co	12	6	3^{4}	Ret	10	15	15	8	7	4	Ret	2	3	2^{3}	9^{1}	NC	1^{1}	311
4	(Belgium) Comtoyou DHL Team Audi Sport	17	9	14^{1}	12	12	1^{1}	Ret	2^{1}	12	11	11	12	4	4^{4}	4	NC	8^{3}	265
4	(Belgium) Comtoyou DHL Team Audi Sport	31	4^{5}	6	5	8^{5}	6	1	6^{4}	11	17	13	19†	Ret	8	12	15	15	265
5	(Hungary) Zengő Motorsport Services KFT	55 (Note: Bence Boldizs was ineligible to score points for the teams' championship.)	17	17	10	13	21†	13	NC	16	6	17	9	DNS	15	17	Ret	16	185
5	(Hungary) Zengő Motorsport Services KFT	96	16	11	Ret	4	8	4	5	6^{2}	Ret	4^{5}	4^{5}	1	7	5^{3}	3	5	185
5	(Hungary) Zengő Motorsport Services KFT	99	19	18	11	14	20	17	16	19	16	21	18	17†	13	Ret	14	19	185
6	(Germany) ALL-INKL.DE Münnich Motorsport	9	3	20	Ret	3^{3}	11	Ret	DNS	5^{5}	8	6^{2}	17	13	Ret	10	8	10	179
6	(Germany) ALL-INKL.DE Münnich Motorsport	18	Ret	19	8	9	13	9	17†	14^{4}	9	2^{3}	14	12	Ret	20†	10	11	179
7	(Italy) BRC Hyundai N Lukoil Squadra Corse	1	11	8	DNP	DNP	10	6	10^{2}	21	5	10	6^{1}	15	16	16	5	7	172
7	(Italy) BRC Hyundai N Lukoil Squadra Corse	30	15	15	DNP	DNP	2^{5}	Ret	Ret	NC	18	7	5^{4}	5	3	15	Ret	13	172
8	(Germany) Engstler Hyundai N Liqui Moly Racing Team	8	12	10	DNP	DNP	NC	10	9	8	Ret	16	8	9	Ret	13	11	14	128
8	(Germany) Engstler Hyundai N Liqui Moly Racing Team	27														18	13	20†	128
8	(Germany) Engstler Hyundai N Liqui Moly Racing Team	40											16	14	10				128
8	(Germany) Engstler Hyundai N Liqui Moly Racing Team	88	14	9	DNP	DNP	17^{2}	5	1^{3}										128
8	(Germany) Engstler Hyundai N Liqui Moly Racing Team	97								18	14	20							128
Single Car & Wildcard entries ineligible to score points
–	(Italy) Team Mulsanne	25	18	16			12	Ret	Ret	13	13	15				Ret	9	12	–
–	(Italy) Team Mulsanne	69	5	7	9	6	3^{3}	14	4	9	3	5	1^{3}	Ret	6^{5}	8^{2}	2	3^{5}	–
–	(Belgium) Comtoyou Racing	15											15	16	11				–
–	(Belgium) Comtoyou Racing	16	10^{3}	4^{3}	7	Ret	7^{4}	2	3^{5}	15	10	14	3^{2}	8	5^{1}	3	4	9	–
–	(Czech Republic) Vexta Domy	22					18	11	14										–
–	(Switzerland) Vuković Motorsport	7	20†	21†	Ret	DNS													–
–	(Switzerland) Vuković Motorsport	33	13	12															–
–	(Switzerland) Vuković Motorsport	34					16	12	12	17	19†	19	Ret	NC	Ret	14	12	17	–
–	(Italy) Target Competition	28								20	15	18				19	Ret	DNS	–
Pos.	Team	No.	BEL (Belgium)		GER (Germany)		SVK (Slovakia)			HUN (Hungary)			ESP (Spain)			ARA (Aragon)			Pts.

Colour	Result
Gold	Winner
Silver	Second place
Bronze	Third place
Green	Points classification
Blue	Non-points classification
Blue	Non-classified finish (NC)
Purple	Retired, not classified (Ret)
Red	Did not qualify (DNQ)
Red	Did not pre-qualify (DNPQ)
Black	Disqualified (DSQ)
White	Did not start (DNS)
White	Withdrew (WD)
White	Race cancelled (C)
Blank	Did not practice (DNP)
Blank	Did not arrive (DNA)
Blank	Excluded (EX)

† – Drivers did not finish the race, but were classified as they completed over 75% of the race distance.

=== Rookies' championship ===
Pos.	Driver	BEL (Belgium)		GER (Germany)		SVK (Slovakia)			HUN (Hungary)			ESP (Spain)			ARA (Aragon)			Pts.
1	(Belgium) Gilles Magnus	10^{1}	4^{1}	7	Ret^{1}	7^{1}	2	3^{1}	15	10	14	3^{1}	8	5^{1}	3^{1}	4	9	410
2	(Germany) Luca Engstler	12^{2}	10	DNP	DNP	NC^{3}	10	9	8^{2}	Ret	16	8^{2}	9	Ret	13^{3}	11	14	243
3	(Hungary) Bence Boldizs	17^{4}	17	10	13	21†^{2}	13	NC	16^{1}	6	17	9^{3}	DNS	15	17^{2}	Ret	16	236
4	(Austria) Nico Gruber								18^{3}	14	20							45
5	(Malaysia) Mitchell Cheah														18^{4}	13	20†	31
6	(United Kingdom) Jack Young	20†^{3}	21†	Ret	DNS^{2}													11
Pos.	Driver	BEL (Belgium)		GER (Germany)		SVK (Slovakia)			HUN (Hungary)			ESP (Spain)			ARA (Aragon)			Pts.

=== WTCR Trophy ===
Eligible for drivers racing without manufacturer support.

Pos.	Driver	BEL (Belgium)		GER (Germany)		SVK (Slovakia)			HUN (Hungary)			ESP (Spain)			ARA (Aragon)			Pts.
1	(France) Jean-Karl Vernay	5	7	9	6	3	14	4	9^{1}	3	5	1	Ret	6	8^{1}	2	3	121
2	(Belgium) Gilles Magnus	10^{1}	4	7	Ret	7	2	3	15	10	14	3^{1}	8	5	3	4	9	101
3	(France) Nathanaël Berthon	9	14	12	12	1^{1}	Ret	2	12	11	11	12	4	4	4	NC	8	94
4	(Netherlands) Tom Coronel	4	6	5	8^{1}	6	1	6	11	17	13	19†	Ret	8	12	15	15	80
5	(Hungary) Bence Boldizs	17	17	10	13	21†	13	NC	16	6	17	9	DNS	15	17	Ret	16	28
6	(France) Aurélien Comte					16	12	12	17	19†	19	Ret	NC	Ret	14	12	17	13
7	(Hungary) Gábor Kismarty-Lechner	19	18	11	14	20	17	16	19	16	21	18†	17†	13	Ret	14	19	8
8	(United Kingdom) Jack Young	20†	21†	Ret	DNS													0
Pos.	Driver	BEL (Belgium)		GER (Germany)		SVK (Slovakia)			HUN (Hungary)			ESP (Spain)			ARA (Aragon)			Pts.
