= 2020 FIA WTCR Race of Belgium =

Race details
- Round 1 of 6 in the 2020 World Touring Car Cup
| Date | 12–13 September 2020 |
| Official name | FIA WTCR Race of Belgium |
| Location | Circuit Zolder, Heusden-Zolder, Belgium |
| Distance | Race One; 13 laps / TBC |
| Distance | Race Two; 18 laps / TBC |
- Race 1

Pole
| Driver | (Argentina) Néstor Girolami | ALL-INKL.COM Münnich Motorsport |
| Time | 1:36.119 |

Fastest lap
| Driver | (Argentina) Néstor Girolami | ALL-INKL.COM Münnich Motorsport |
| Time | 1:37.207 |

Podium
| First | (Argentina) Néstor Girolami | ALL-INKL.COM Münnich Motorsport |
| Second | (Sweden) Thed Björk | Cyan Performance Lynk & Co |
| Third | (Hungary) Attila Tassi | ALL-INKL.DE Münnich Motorsport |
- Race 2

Pole
| Driver | (France) Nathanaël Berthon | Comtoyou DHL Team Audi Sport |
| Time | 1:35.486 |

Fastest lap
| Driver | (France) Nathanaël Berthon | Comtoyou DHL Team Audi Sport |
| Time | 1:36.724 |

Podium
| First | (France) Yann Ehrlacher | Cyan Racing Lynk & Co |
| Second | (France) Yvan Muller | Cyan Racing Lynk & Co |
| Third | (Uruguay) Santiago Urrutia | Cyan Performance Lynk & Co |

The 2020 FIA WTCR Race of Belgium was the first round of the 2020 World Touring Car Cup and the first running of the FIA WTCR Race of Belgium. It was held on 12 and 13 September 2020 at Circuit Zolder in Heusden-Zolder, Belgium.

== Entry list ==
A total of 22 cars are entered, which includes two wildcard entries; Dylan O'Keeffe and Luca Filippi. The following teams and drivers are entered into the event:

| Team | Car | No. | Drivers | Class |
|---|---|---|---|---|
| (Italy) BRC Hyundai N LUKOIL Squadra Corse | Hyundai i30 N TCR | 1 | (Hungary) Norbert Michelisz | |
| (Switzerland) Vuković Motorsport | Renault Mégane R.S TCR | 7 | (United Kingdom) Jack Young | R T |
| (Germany) Engstler Hyundai N Liqui Moly Racing Team | Hyundai i30 N TCR | 8 | (Germany) Luca Engstler | R |
| (Germany) ALL-INKL.DE Münnich Motorsport | Honda Civic Type R TCR (FK8) | 9 | (Hungary) Attila Tassi | |
| (Sweden) Cyan Performance Lynk & Co | Lynk & Co 03 TCR | 11 | (Sweden) Thed Björk | |
| (Sweden) Cyan Performance Lynk & Co | Lynk & Co 03 TCR | 12 | (Uruguay) Santiago Urrutia | |
| (Belgium) Comtoyou Racing | Audi RS 3 LMS TCR | 16 | (Belgium) Gilles Magnus | R T |
| (Belgium) Comtoyou DHL Team Audi Sport | Audi RS 3 LMS TCR | 17 | (France) Nathanaël Berthon | T |
| (Germany) ALL-INKL.DE Münnich Motorsport | Honda Civic Type R TCR (FK8) | 18 | (Portugal) Tiago Monteiro | |
| (Germany) ALL-INKL.COM Münnich Motorsport | Honda Civic Type R TCR (FK8) | 29 | (Argentina) Néstor Girolami | |
| (Italy) BRC Hyundai N LUKOIL Squadra Corse | Hyundai i30 N TCR | 30 | (Italy) Gabriele Tarquini | |
| (Belgium) Comtoyou DHL Team Audi Sport | Audi RS 3 LMS TCR | 31 | (Netherlands) Tom Coronel | T |
| (Hungary) Zengő Motorsport Services KFT | CUPRA León Competición TCR | 55 | (Hungary) Bence Boldizs | R T |
| (Sweden) Cyan Racing Lynk & Co | Lynk & Co 03 TCR | 68 | (France) Yann Ehrlacher | |
| (Italy) Team Mulsanne | Alfa Romeo Giulietta Veloce TCR | 69 | (France) Jean-Karl Vernay | T |
| (Germany) ALL-INKL.COM Münnich Motorsport | Honda Civic Type R TCR (FK8) | 86 | (Argentina) Esteban Guerrieri | |
| (Germany) Engstler Hyundai N Liqui Moly Racing Team | Hyundai i30 N TCR | 88 | (Netherlands) Nicky Catsburg | |
| (Hungary) Zengő Motorsport Services KFT | CUPRA León Competición TCR | 96 | (Spain) Mikel Azcona | |
| (Hungary) Zengő Motorsport Services KFT | CUPRA León Competición TCR | 99 | (Hungary) Gábor Kismarty-Lechner | T |
| (Sweden) Cyan Racing Lynk & Co | Lynk & Co 03 TCR | 100 | (France) Yvan Muller | |
Wildcard entries
| (Italy) Team Mulsanne | Alfa Romeo Giulietta Veloce TCR | 25 | (Italy) Luca Filippi | |
| (Switzerland) Vuković Motorsport | Renault Mégane R.S TCR | 33 | (Australia) Dylan O'Keeffe | |

| Icon | Class |
|---|---|
| R | Eligible for FIA Rookie award |
| T | Eligible for WTCR Trophy |

== Results ==
=== Qualifying ===
For race 1, the top 10 in Q2 were reversed and Q3 results determined race 2 pole position.

| Pos. | No. | Name | Team | Car | Class | Q1 | Q2 | Q3 | Points |
|---|---|---|---|---|---|---|---|---|---|
| 1 | 17 | (France) Nathanaël Berthon | Comtoyou DHL Team Audi Sport | Audi RS 3 LMS TCR | T | 1:36.224 | 1:35.895 | 1:35.486 | 5 |
| 2 | 68 | (France) Yann Ehrlacher | Cyan Racing Lynk & Co | Lynk & Co 03 TCR | | 1:35.827 | 1:35.783 | 1:35.517 | 4 |
| 3 | 16 | (Belgium) Gilles Magnus | Comtoyou Racing | Audi RS 3 LMS TCR | R T | 1:36.050 | 1:35.480 | 1:35.527 | 3 |
| 4 | 12 | (Uruguay) Santiago Urrutia | Cyan Performance Lynk & Co | Lynk & Co 03 TCR | | 1:36.338 | 1:35.644 | 1:35.880 | 2 |
| 5 | 100 | (France) Yvan Muller | Cyan Racing Lynk & Co | Lynk & Co 03 TCR | | 1:36.076 | 1:35.798 | 1:36.069 | 1 |
| 6 | 31 | (Netherlands) Tom Coronel | Comtoyou DHL Team Audi Sport | Audi RS 3 LMS TCR | T | 1:36.176 | 1:35.907 | – | |
| 7 | 9 | (Hungary) Attila Tassi | ALL-INKL.DE Münnich Motorsport | Honda Civic Type R TCR (FK8) | | 1:36.218 | 1:35.941 | – | |
| 8 | 11 | (Sweden) Thed Björk | Cyan Performance Lynk & Co | Lynk & Co 03 TCR | | 1:35.952 | 1:35.993 | – | |
| 9 | 69 | (France) Jean-Karl Vernay | Team Mulsanne | Alfa Romeo Giulietta Veloce TCR | T | 1:36.506 | 1:36.065 | – | |
| 10 | 29 | (Argentina) Néstor Girolami | ALL-INKL.COM Münnich Motorsport | Honda Civic Type R TCR (FK8) | | 1:36.754 | 1:36.119 | – | |
| 11 | 86 | (Argentina) Esteban Guerrieri | ALL-INKL.COM Münnich Motorsport | Honda Civic Type R TCR (FK8) | | 1:36.455 | 1:36.301 | – | |
| 12 | 1 | (Hungary) Norbert Michelisz | BRC Hyundai N LUKOIL Squadra Corse | Hyundai i30 N TCR | | 1:36.648 | 1:36.606 | – | |
| 13 | 33 | (Australia) Dylan O'Keeffe | Vuković Motorsport | Renault Mégane R.S TCR | | 1:36.877 | – | – | |
| 14 | 8 | (Germany) Luca Engstler | Engstler Hyundai N Liqui Moly Racing Team | Hyundai i30 N TCR | R | 1:37.020 | – | – | |
| 15 | 30 | (Italy) Gabriele Tarquini | BRC Hyundai N LUKOIL Squadra Corse | Hyundai i30 N TCR | | 1:37.054 | – | – | |
| 16 | 7 | (United Kingdom) Jack Young | Vuković Motorsport | Renault Mégane R.S TCR | R T | 1:37.062 | – | – | |
| 17 | 18 | (Portugal) Tiago Monteiro | ALL-INKL.DE Münnich Motorsport | Honda Civic Type R TCR (FK8) | | 1:37.192 | – | – | |
| 18 | 55 | (Hungary) Bence Boldizs | Zengő Motorsport Services KFT | CUPRA León Competición TCR | R T | 1:37.353 | – | – | |
| 19 | 88 | (Netherlands) Nick Catsburg^{1} | Engstler Hyundai N Liqui Moly Racing Team | Hyundai i30 N TCR | | 1:37.025 | – | – | |
| 20 | 96 | (Spain) Mikel Azcona | Zengő Motorsport Services KFT | CUPRA León Competición TCR | | 1:37.410 | – | – | |
| 21 | 25 | (Italy) Luca Filippi | Team Mulsanne | Alfa Romeo Giulietta Veloce TCR | | –^{2} | – | – | |
| 22 | 96 | (Hungary) Gábor Kismarty-Lechner | Zengő Motorsport Services KFT | CUPRA León Competición TCR | T | –^{2} | – | – | |

- ^1 Nick Catsburg was given a five-place grid penalty for failing to slow for yellow flags.
- ^2 Luca Filippi and Gábor Kismarty-Lechner's times were deleted as they failed to stop at the weighbridge.
