= FIA WTCR Race of the Netherlands =

Race of the Netherlands
- Circuit Park Zandvoort (2007, 2018–2019)

Race information
- Number of times held: 3
- First held: 2007
- Last held: 2019
- Most wins (drivers): (Sweden) Thed Björk (2)
- Most wins (constructors): (Japan) Honda (2) (Sweden) Lynk & Co (2)

Last race (2019)
- Race 1 Winner: (Sweden) Thed Björk; (Cyan Racing Lynk & Co)
- Race 2 Winner: (Argentina) Esteban Guerrieri; (ALL-INKL.COM Münnich Motorsport)
- Race 3 Winner: (Sweden) Thed Björk; (Cyan Racing Lynk & Co)

The FIA WTCR Race of the Netherlands is a round of the World Touring Car Cup, which is held at Circuit Park Zandvoort near Zandvoort in the Netherlands. It was also part of the World Touring Car Championship during the 2007 season.

The Dutch round was added to the 2007 calendar due to the cancellation of the Race of Mexico, which returned in 2008.

== Winners ==
Year	Race	Driver	Team	Manufacturer	Location	Report
2019	Race 1	(Sweden) Thed Björk	(Sweden) Cyan Racing Lynk & Co	(Sweden) Lynk & Co	Zandvoort	Report
2019	Race 2	(Argentina) Esteban Guerrieri	(Germany) ALL-INKL.COM Münnich Motorsport	(Japan) Honda	Zandvoort	Report
2019	Race 3	(Sweden) Thed Björk	(Sweden) Cyan Racing Lynk & Co	(Sweden) Lynk & Co	Zandvoort	Report
2018	Race 1	(France) Yann Ehrlacher	(Germany) ALL-INKL.COM Münnich Motorsport	(Japan) Honda	Zandvoort	Report
2018	Race 2	(France) Aurélien Comte	(Belgium) DG Sport Compétition	(France) Peugeot	Zandvoort	Report
2018	Race 3	(France) Jean-Karl Vernay	(Luxembourg) Audi Sport Leopard Lukoil Team WRT	(Germany) Audi	Zandvoort	Report
2007	Race 1	(Switzerland) Alain Menu	(United Kingdom) Chevrolet RML	(United States) Chevrolet	Zandvoort	Report
2007	Race 2	(Italy) Gabriele Tarquini	(Spain) SEAT Sport	(Spain) SEAT	Zandvoort	Report
