= FIA WTCR Race of Slovakia =

Touring car race in Slovakia

FIA WTCC Race of Slovakia
- Automotodróm Slovakia Ring (2012–2016, 2018–2020)

Race information
- Number of times held: 8
- First held: 2012
- Last held: 2020
- Most wins (drivers): (Italy) Gabriele Tarquini (3)
- Most wins (constructors): (France) Citroën (4)

Last race (2020)
- Race 1 Winner: (France) Nathanaël Berthon; (Comtoyou DHL Team Audi Sport)
- Race 2 Winner: (Netherlands) Tom Coronel; (Comtoyou DHL Team Audi Sport)
- Race 3 Winner: (Netherlands) Nicky Catsburg; (Engstler Hyundai N Liqui Moly Racing Team)

The FIA WTCC Race of Slovakia, currently the FIA WTCR Race of Slovakia, is a former round of the World Touring Car Championship, currently of the World Touring Car Cup, held at the Automotodróm Slovakia Ring, in the village of Orechová Potôň, Slovakia, 42 km (26 mi) away from the capital city of Bratislava.

The race made its debut in the World Touring Car Championship as the fourth round of the 2012 season and as a replacement for the proposed Argentinian round.

The race was held for another four consecutive years, until 2016, not being included in the 2017 season calendar of the series.

It returned however as a round of the inaugural World Touring Car Cup season in 2018, as a replacement for the cancelled Argentina round.

== Winners ==
Year	Race	Driver	Manufacturer	Location	Report
2020	Race 1	(France) Nathanaël Berthon	(Germany) Audi	Slovakia Ring	Report
2020	Race 2	(Netherlands) Tom Coronel	(Germany) Audi	Slovakia Ring	Report
2020	Race 3	(Netherlands) Nicky Catsburg	(South Korea) Hyundai	Slovakia Ring	Report
2019	Race 1	(Belgium) Frédéric Vervisch	(Germany) Audi	Slovakia Ring	Report
2019	Race 2	(Argentina) Néstor Girolami	(Japan) Honda	Slovakia Ring	Report
2019	Race 3	(China) Ma Qing Hua	(Italy) Alfa Romeo	Slovakia Ring	Report
2018	Race 1	(Spain) Pepe Oriola	(Spain) Cupra	Slovakia Ring	Report
2018	Race 2	(Italy) Gabriele Tarquini	(South Korea) Hyundai	Slovakia Ring	Report
2018	Race 3	(Hungary) Norbert Michelisz	(South Korea) Hyundai	Slovakia Ring	Report
2016	Opening Race	(Portugal) Tiago Monteiro	(Japan) Honda	Slovakia Ring	Report
2016	Main Race	(Argentina) José María López	(France) Citroën	Slovakia Ring	Report
2015	Race 1	(France) Yvan Muller	(France) Citroën	Slovakia Ring	Report
2015	Race 2	(France) Sébastien Loeb	(France) Citroën	Slovakia Ring	Report
2014	Race 1	(France) Sébastien Loeb	(France) Citroën	Slovakia Ring	Report
2014	Race 2	Race cancelled		Slovakia Ring	Report
2013	Race 1	(Italy) Gabriele Tarquini	(Japan) Honda	Slovakia Ring	Report
2013	Race 2	(Netherlands) Tom Coronel	(Germany) BMW	Slovakia Ring	Report
2012	Race 1	(Italy) Gabriele Tarquini	(Spain) SEAT	Slovakia Ring	Report
2012	Race 2	(United Kingdom) Robert Huff	(United States) Chevrolet	Slovakia Ring	Report
