= Wuhan Street Circuit =

Motorsport track in Wuhan, China

- Location: Wuhan, China
- Coordinates: 30°30′4″N 114°10′17″E
- Opened: November 2017; 8 years ago
- Closed: December 2019; 6 years ago
- Major events: Former: CTCC (2017–2019); WTCR Race of China-Wuhan (2018); Chinese F4 (2018)

Street Circuit (2018–2019)
- Length: 2.984 km (1.854 mi)
- Turns: 13
- Race lap record: 1:23.990 ( (Belgium) Frédéric Vervisch, Audi RS 3 LMS TCR, 2018, TCR)

Street Circuit (2017)
- Length: 2.429 km (1.509 mi)
- Turns: 13

The Wuhan Street Circuit is a street circuit in the Chinese city of Wuhan, the capital of the province of Hubei.

== History ==
The Wuhan Street Circuit is located around the Wuhan Sports Center, a large sports complex in the city. The street circuit was first used in 2017, when the penultimate race weekend of the China Touring Car Championship (CTCC) was held in Wuhan. The races were won by Robert Huff and Zhendong Zhang.

In 2018, the race weekend was extended alongside the CTCC with the TCR China Touring Car Championship and the Chinese Formula 4 Championship, while with the World Touring Car Cup (WTCR) the first international event was attracted. It was the second Chinese event on the WTCR calendar, after having already been on the Ningbo International Circuit a week earlier.

== Lap records ==
The fastest official race lap records at the Wuhan Street Circuit are listed as:

Category	Time	Driver	Vehicle	Event
Full Circuit (2018–2019): 2.984 km (1.854 mi)
TCR Touring Car	1:23.990	Frédéric Vervisch	Audi RS 3 LMS TCR	2018 WTCR Race of China - Wuhan
