= FIA WTCR Race of Malaysia =

- Sepang International Circuit (2019)

Race information
- Number of times held: 1
- First held: 2019
- Last held: 2019
- Most wins (drivers): (Hungary) Norbert Michelisz (Argentina) Esteban Guerrieri (Sweden) Johan Kristoffersson (1)
- Most wins (constructors): (South Korea) Hyundai (Japan) Honda (Germany) Volkswagen (1)

Last race (2019)
- Race 1 Winner: (Hungary) Norbert Michelisz; (BRC Hyundai N Squadra Corse)
- Race 2 Winner: (Argentina) Esteban Guerrieri; (ALL-INKL.COM Münnich Motorsport)
- Race 3 Winner: (Sweden) Johan Kristoffersson; (SLR Volkswagen)

The FIA WTCR Race of Malaysia was a round of the World Touring Car Cup, which was held at the Sepang International Circuit in Malaysia. The race ran as the season finale of the 2019 season.

== Winners ==
Year	Race	Driver	Team	Manufacturer	Location	Report
2019	Race 1	(Hungary) Norbert Michelisz	(Italy) BRC Hyundai N Squadra Corse	(South Korea) Hyundai	Sepang	Report
2019	Race 2	(Argentina) Esteban Guerrieri	(Germany) ALL-INKL.COM Münnich Motorsport	(Japan) Honda	Sepang	Report
2019	Race 3	(Sweden) Johan Kristoffersson	(France) SLR Volkswagen	(Germany) Volkswagen	Sepang	Report
