= 2019 Macau Guia Race =

Race details
Date	18–20 November
- Official name
Location	Circuito da Guia, Macau Peninsula, Macau
Course	Temporary street circuit 6.2 km (3.9 mi)
- Supporting
Distance	Race 1; 8 laps, 40.216 km (24.989 mi); Race 2; 12 laps, 40.216 km (24.989 mi); Race 3; 12 laps, 40.216 km (24.989 mi)
- Race 1

Pole
Driver	TBA	TBA
- Time TBA

Fastest lap
- N/A

Podium
- Race 2
- Race 3

The 2019 Macau Guia Race was the fourth edition of the Macau Guia Race under the TCR Regulations held at Guia Circuit in Macau on 13–17 November 2020. The race was contested with TCR touring cars and run in support of the 2019 Macau Grand Prix. The race served as the penultimate round of the 2019 World Touring Car Cup.

== Teams and drivers ==
The following teams and drivers are entered into the event:

Entrant	Car	No.	Driver
(Italy) BRC Hyundai N Squadra Corse	Hyundai i30 N TCR	1	(Italy) Gabriele Tarquini
(Sweden) PWR Racing	CUPRA León TCR	2	(Sweden) Robert Dahlgren
(Italy) BRC Hyundai N Squadra Corse	Hyundai i30 N TCR	5	(Hungary) Norbert Michelisz
(Italy) BRC Hyundai N LUKOIL Racing Team	Hyundai i30 N TCR	6	(Germany) Luca Engstler
(Hong Kong) KCMG	Honda Civic Type R TCR (FK8)	9	(Hungary) Attila Tassi
(Belgium) Audi Sport Team Comtoyou	Audi RS 3 LMS TCR	10	(Netherlands) Niels Langeveld
(Sweden) Cyan Racing Lynk & Co	Lynk & Co 03 TCR	11	(Sweden) Thed Björk
(France) SLR VW Motorsport	Volkswagen Golf GTI TCR	12	(United Kingdom) Robert Huff
(France) SLR Volkswagen	Volkswagen Golf GTI TCR	14	(Sweden) Johan Kristoffersson
(Hong Kong) KCMG	Honda Civic Type R TCR (FK8)	18	(Portugal) Tiago Monteiro
(Hong Kong) KCMG	Honda Civic Type R TCR (FK8)	19	(Hong Kong) Jim Ka To
(Belgium) Comtoyou Team DHL CUPRA Racing	CUPRA León TCR	21	(France) Aurélien Panis
(Belgium) Audi Sport Team Comtoyou	Audi RS 3 LMS TCR	22	(Belgium) Frédéric Vervisch
(France) SLR VW Motorsport	Volkswagen Golf GTI TCR	25	(Morocco) Mehdi Bennani
(Germany) ALL-INKL.COM Münnich Motorsport	Honda Civic Type R TCR (FK8)	29	(Argentina) Néstor Girolami
(Italy) Team Mulsanne	Alfa Romeo Giulietta Veloce TCR	31	(Italy) Kevin Ceccon
(France) SLR Volkswagen	Volkswagen Golf GTI TCR	33	(Germany) Benjamin Leuchter
(China) Tian Shi Zuver Team	Audi RS 3 LMS TCR	36	(Macau) Billy Lo
(Belgium) Comtoyou Team DHL CUPRA Racing	CUPRA León TCR	50	(Netherlands) Tom Coronel
(Luxembourg) Audi Sport Team Leopard Racing	Audi RS 3 LMS TCR	52	(United Kingdom) Gordon Shedden
(Italy) Team Mulsanne	Alfa Romeo Giulietta Veloce TCR	55	(China) Ma Qing Hua
(Macau) Son Veng Racing Team	Volkswagen Golf GTI TCR	59	(Hong Kong) Anson Wong
(Sweden) Cyan Performance Lynk & Co	Lynk & Co 03 TCR	68	(France) Yann Ehrlacher
(Luxembourg) Audi Sport Team Leopard Racing	Audi RS 3 LMS TCR	69	(France) Jean-Karl Vernay
(Germany) ALL-INKL.COM Münnich Motorsport	Honda Civic Type R TCR (FK8)	86	(Argentina) Esteban Guerrieri
(Italy) BRC Hyundai N LUKOIL Racing Team	Hyundai i30 N TCR	88	(Netherlands) Nick Catsburg
(Sweden) PWR Racing	CUPRA León TCR	96	(Spain) Mikel Azcona
(Hong Kong) Team TRC	Honda Civic Type R TCR (FK8)	97	(Hong Kong) Terence Tse
(Hong Kong) Team TRC	Honda Civic Type R TCR (FK8)	98	(Hong Kong) James Tang
(Hong Kong) Team TRC	Honda Civic Type R TCR (FK8)	99	(Hong Kong) Arthur Law
(Sweden) Cyan Performance Lynk & Co	Lynk & Co 03 TCR	100	(France) Yvan Muller
(Sweden) Cyan Racing Lynk & Co	Lynk & Co 03 TCR	111	(United Kingdom) Andy Priaulx

== Results ==
=== Qualifying ===
Pos.	No.	Name	Team	Car	Time
1	100	(France) Yvan Muller	Cyan Racing Lynk & Co	Lynk & Co 03 TCR	2:28.661
2	5	(Hungary) Norbert Michelisz	BRC Hyundai N Squadra Corse	Hyundai i30 N TCR	2:28.729
3	111	(United Kingdom) Andy Priaulx	Cyan Performance Lynk & Co	Lynk & Co 03 TCR	2:28.806
4	31	(Italy) Kevin Ceccon	Team Mulsanne	Alfa Romeo Giulietta Veloce TCR	2:28.846
5	68	(France) Yann Ehrlacher	Cyan Performance Lynk & Co	Lynk & Co 03 TCR	2:28.942
6	11	(Sweden) Thed Björk	Cyan Racing Lynk & Co	Lynk & Co 03 TCR	2:29.060
7	12	(United Kingdom) Robert Huff	SLR VW Motorsport	Volkswagen Golf GTI TCR	2:29.451
8	1	(Italy) Gabriele Tarquini	BRC Hyundai N Squadra Corse	Hyundai i30 N TCR	2:29.470
9	33	(Germany) Benjamin Leuchter	SLR Volkswagen	Volkswagen Golf GTI TCR	2:29.660
10	96	(Spain) Mikel Azcona	PWR Racing	CUPRA León TCR	2:29.683
11	22	(Belgium) Frédéric Vervisch	Audi Sport Team Comtoyou	Audi RS 3 LMS TCR	2:29.709
12	88	(Netherlands) Nick Catsburg	BRC Hyundai N LUKOIL Racing Team	Hyundai i30 N TCR	2:29.770
13	86	(Argentina) Esteban Guerrieri	ALL-INKL.COM Münnich Motorsport	Honda Civic Type R TCR (FK8)	2:29.833
14	2	(Sweden) Robert Dahlgren	PWR Racing	CUPRA León TCR	2:29.891
15	18	(Portugal) Tiago Monteiro	KCMG	Honda Civic Type R TCR (FK8)	2:29.919
16	14	(Sweden) Johan Kristoffersson	SLR Volkswagen	Volkswagen Golf GTI TCR	2:30.039
17	69	(France) Jean-Karl Vernay	Audi Sport Team Leopard Racing	Audi RS 3 LMS TCR	2:30.200
18	29	(Argentina) Néstor Girolami	ALL-INKL.COM Münnich Motorsport	Honda Civic Type R TCR (FK8)	2:30.353
19	55	(China) Ma Qing Hua	Team Mulsanne	Alfa Romeo Giulietta Veloce TCR	2:30.445
20	21	(France) Aurélien Panis	Comtoyou Team DHL CUPRA Racing	CUPRA León TCR	2:30.462
21	25	(Morocco) Mehdi Bennani	SLR VW Motorsport	Volkswagen Golf GTI TCR	2:30.788
22	9	(Hungary) Attila Tassi	KCMG	Honda Civic Type R TCR (FK8)	2:30.835
23	10	(Netherlands) Niels Langeveld	Audi Sport Team Comtoyou	Audi RS 3 LMS TCR	2:30.867
24	52	(United Kingdom) Gordon Shedden	Audi Sport Team Leopard Racing	Audi RS 3 LMS TCR	2:30.888
25	6	(Germany) Luca Engstler	BRC Hyundai N LUKOIL Racing Team	Hyundai i30 N TCR	2:31.533
26	50	(Netherlands) Tom Coronel	Comtoyou Team DHL CUPRA Racing	CUPRA León TCR	2:31.608
27	19	(Hong Kong) Jim Ka To	KCMG	Honda Civic Type R TCR (FK8)	2:33.654
28	36	(Macau) Billy Lo	Tian Shi Zuver Team	Audi RS 3 LMS TCR	2:34.791
Did not qualify
29	98	(Hong Kong) James Tang	Team TRC	Honda Civic Type R TCR (FK8)	2:36.795
30	59	(Hong Kong) Anson Wong	Son Veng Racing Team	Volkswagen Golf GTI TCR	2:39.999
31	97	(Hong Kong) Terence Tse	Team TRC	Honda Civic Type R TCR (FK8)	2:43.146
32	99	(Hong Kong) Arthur Law	Team TRC	Honda Civic Type R TCR (FK8)	–
