= 2019 World Touring Car Cup =

Motorsport contest

Champions
- Drivers' Champion: Norbert Michelisz
- Teams' Champion: Cyan Racing Lynk & Co

Seasons
- ← 2018 2020 →

The 2019 World Touring Car Cup was the second season of the World Touring Car Cup and 15th overall of World Touring Cars promoted by Discovery Sports Events, which dates back to the 2005 World Touring Car Championship.

The drivers' championship was won by Norbert Michelisz. The teams' championship was won by Cyan Racing Lynk & Co.

== Teams and drivers ==
Team	Car	No.	Drivers	Rounds
Season entries
(Italy) BRC Hyundai N Squadra Corse	Hyundai i30 N TCR	1	(Italy) Gabriele Tarquini	All
(Italy) BRC Hyundai N Squadra Corse	Hyundai i30 N TCR	5	(Hungary) Norbert Michelisz	All
(Italy) BRC Hyundai N LUKOIL Racing Team	Hyundai i30 N TCR	6	(Germany) Luca Engstler	9
(Italy) BRC Hyundai N LUKOIL Racing Team	Hyundai i30 N TCR	8	(Brazil) Augusto Farfus	1–8, 10
(Italy) BRC Hyundai N LUKOIL Racing Team	Hyundai i30 N TCR	88	(Netherlands) Nick Catsburg	All
(Sweden) PWR Racing	CUPRA León TCR	2	(Sweden) Robert Dahlgren	9
(Sweden) PWR Racing	CUPRA León TCR	37	(Sweden) Daniel Haglöf	1–8, 10
(Sweden) PWR Racing	CUPRA León TCR	96	(Spain) Mikel Azcona	All
(Hong Kong) KCMG	Honda Civic Type R TCR (FK8)	9	(Hungary) Attila Tassi	All
(Hong Kong) KCMG	Honda Civic Type R TCR (FK8)	18	(Portugal) Tiago Monteiro	All
(Belgium) Audi Sport Team Comtoyou	Audi RS 3 LMS TCR	10	(Netherlands) Niels Langeveld	All
(Belgium) Audi Sport Team Comtoyou	Audi RS 3 LMS TCR	22	(Belgium) Frédéric Vervisch	All
(Belgium) Comtoyou Team DHL CUPRA Racing	CUPRA León TCR	21	(France) Aurélien Panis	All
(Belgium) Comtoyou Team DHL CUPRA Racing	CUPRA León TCR	50	(Netherlands) Tom Coronel	All
(Sweden) Cyan Racing Lynk & Co	Lynk & Co 03 TCR	11	(Sweden) Thed Björk	All
(Sweden) Cyan Racing Lynk & Co	Lynk & Co 03 TCR	100	(France) Yvan Muller	All
(Sweden) Cyan Performance Lynk & Co	Lynk & Co 03 TCR	68	(France) Yann Ehrlacher	All
(Sweden) Cyan Performance Lynk & Co	Lynk & Co 03 TCR	111	(United Kingdom) Andy Priaulx	All
(France) SLR VW Motorsport	Volkswagen Golf GTI TCR	12	(United Kingdom) Robert Huff	All
(France) SLR VW Motorsport	Volkswagen Golf GTI TCR	25	(Morocco) Mehdi Bennani	All
(France) SLR Volkswagen	Volkswagen Golf GTI TCR	14	(Sweden) Johan Kristoffersson	All
(France) SLR Volkswagen	Volkswagen Golf GTI TCR	33	(Germany) Benjamin Leuchter	All
(Germany) ALL-INKL.COM Münnich Motorsport	Honda Civic Type R TCR (FK8)	29	(Argentina) Néstor Girolami	All
(Germany) ALL-INKL.COM Münnich Motorsport	Honda Civic Type R TCR (FK8)	86	(Argentina) Esteban Guerrieri	All
(Italy) Team Mulsanne	Alfa Romeo Giulietta Veloce TCR	31	(Italy) Kevin Ceccon	All
(Italy) Team Mulsanne	Alfa Romeo Giulietta Veloce TCR	55	(China) Ma Qing Hua	All
(Luxembourg) Audi Sport Team Leopard Racing	Audi RS 3 LMS TCR	52	(United Kingdom) Gordon Shedden	All
(Luxembourg) Audi Sport Team Leopard Racing	Audi RS 3 LMS TCR	69	(France) Jean-Karl Vernay	All
Wildcard entries
(Germany) Hyundai Team Engstler	Hyundai i30 N TCR	6	(Germany) Luca Engstler	3
(Germany) Hyundai Team Engstler	Hyundai i30 N TCR	15	(Malaysia) Hafizh Syahrin	10
(Germany) Hyundai Team Engstler	Hyundai i30 N TCR	27	(Malaysia) Mitchell Cheah	10
(Japan) Audi Sport Team Hitotsuyama	Audi RS 3 LMS TCR	7	(Japan) Ryuichiro Tomita	8
(Japan) Audi Sport Team Hitotsuyama	Audi RS 3 LMS TCR	77	(Japan) Ritomo Miyata	8
(Finland) AS Motorsport	Audi RS 3 LMS TCR	13	(Finland) Antti Buri	5
(Hong Kong) KC Motorgroup	Honda Civic Type R TCR (FK8)	19	(Hong Kong) Jim Ka To	8–9
(Hong Kong) KC Motorgroup	Honda Civic Type R TCR (FK8)	38	(Brazil) João Paulo de Oliveira	10
(Hungary) Zengő Motorsport	CUPRA León TCR	23	(Hungary) Tamás Tenke	2
(China) Tian Shi Zuver Team	Audi RS 3 LMS TCR	36	(Macau) Billy Lo	9
(Macau) Son Veng Racing Team	Volkswagen Golf GTI TCR	59	(Hong Kong) Anson Wong	9
(Malaysia) Viper Niza Racing	CUPRA León TCR	65	(Malaysia) Douglas Khoo	10
(Hong Kong) Team TRC	Honda Civic Type R TCR (FK8)	97	(Hong Kong) Terence Tse	9
(Hong Kong) Team TRC	Honda Civic Type R TCR (FK8)	98	(Hong Kong) James Tang	9
(Hong Kong) Team TRC	Honda Civic Type R TCR (FK8)	99	(Hong Kong) Arthur Law	9

=== Team and driver changes ===
Cyan Racing made a return to the series with the all-new Lynk & Co 03 TCR after missing the 2018 season. Thed Björk was the first driver announced by the team. 2018 runner-up Yvan Muller was confirmed on 18 November 2018. Triple World Touring Car Champion winner Andy Priaulx will be making his return to the series with the team after 9-year absence. Yann Ehrlacher was the final driver to be announced by the team on 19 December 2018. M Racing–YMR, which was supported by Cyan Racing, was disbanded with M Racing (responsible for running the cars on behalf of YMR) moving to the TCR Europe Touring Car Series.

Nick Catsburg and Augusto Farfus drove for BRC Racing Team alongside series champion Gabriele Tarquini and Norbert Michelisz. To meet series regulations the team will be split into two entities of two cars with Tarquini and Michelisz racing under the BRC Hyundai N Squadra Corse banner, while Farfus and Catsburg will race under the BRC Hyundai N Lukoil Racing Team banner. Farfus last raced in the series in 2010 while Catsburg last raced in the series in 2017.

2018 FIA World Rallycross Championship and 2018 TCR Scandinavia Touring Car Championship winner Johan Kristoffersson is set to make series debut driving Volkswagen Golf GTI TCR, prepared by Sébastien Loeb Racing joining Robert Huff and Mehdi Bennani. Benjamin Leuchter was announced as the fourth driver for the team on 30 January 2018.

Néstor Girolami made his series comeback joining ALL-INKL.COM Münnich Motorsport alongside Esteban Guerrieri, replacing Yann Ehrlacher. The team also scaled down to two cars as the series' rules do not allow teams to run more than two cars. Timo Scheider, who drove for the team during the second half of the 2018 season, left the series, but will keep his association with the team in the FIA World Rallycross Championship.

After making one-off appearances for Boutsen Ginion Racing in 2018, Ma Qing Hua made his full season return with Team Mulsanne, joining Kevin Ceccon, who drove for the team during the second half of the 2018 season.

2018 ADAC TCR Germany third-place finisher Niels Langeveld joined Audi Sport Team Comtoyou joining Frédéric Vervisch, while Gordon Shedden and Jean-Karl Vernay remained with Audi Sport Leopard Team WRT. The second team entered by Comtoyou – Comtoyou Racing – switched from Audi RS 3 LMS TCR to CUPRA León TCR as the series do not allow more than four cars per manufacturer. Aurélien Panis will remain the team and was joined by Tom Coronel, who moved from Boutsen Ginion Racing while keeping his association with the team in the TCR Europe Touring Car Series. Denis Dupont, who raced for Audi Sport Team Comtoyou last season, was to remain with the Comtoyou team in the 2019 TCR Europe Touring Car Series, but he confirmed he withdrew from the TCR Europe Touring Car Series on the 17 April.

2018 TCR Europe Touring Car Series teams' winners KCMG entered the series, replacing Boutsen Ginion Racing, who later switched to the TCR Europe Touring Car Series, as the second Honda team. Tiago Monteiro will join the team alongside Attila Tassi, the 2017 TCR International Series runner-up and 4th placed in the 2018 TCR Europe Touring Car Series. Josh Files, who drove for the team in the 2018 TCR Europe Touring Car Series, left the team to join Target Competition in the same series.

2018 TCR Scandinavia Touring Car Championship teams' winners PWR Racing entered the series with support from Comtoyou Racing, replacing Campos Racing as the second CUPRA team. 2018 TCR Europe Touring Car Series winner Mikel Azcona and 2018 TCR Scandinavia Touring Car Championship third-place finisher and team co-owner Daniel Haglöf will drive for the team. Campos Racing drivers – Pepe Oriola and John Filippi – left the series with Oriola joining Indigo Racing in the TCR Asia Series, while Filippi would race for Vuković Motorsport in the TCR Europe Touring Car Series. Zengő Motorsport, which also ran CUPRA cars last season, also switched to TCR Europe Touring Car Series. DG Sport Compétition will also switch to TCR Europe Touring Car Series with Aurélien Comte after Peugeot Sport reduced its support for the 308 TCR. Maťo Homola left the team to join Target Competition in the TCR Europe Touring Car Series.

==== Mid-season changes ====
Augusto Farfus skipped the Guia Race of Macau due to clashing commitments with FIA GT World Cup held on the same weekend. As the series do not allow drivers race in different event held at the same weekend, he was replaced at BRC Hyundai N LUKOIL Racing Team by Luca Engstler, who had previously raced as wildcard entry at the Slovakiaring for Hyundai Team Engstler.

== Calendar ==
The 2019 championship was contested in thirty rounds in Europe, Africa and East Asia.

A provisional calendar was released on 5 December 2018.

Rnd.	Race	Race name	Circuit	Date	Supporting
1	1	AFRIQUIA Race of Morocco	(Morocco) Circuit International Automobile Moulay El Hassan	6 April	FRMSA
1	2	AFRIQUIA Race of Morocco	(Morocco) Circuit International Automobile Moulay El Hassan	7 April	FRMSA
1	3	AFRIQUIA Race of Morocco	(Morocco) Circuit International Automobile Moulay El Hassan	7 April	FRMSA
2	4	Race of Hungary	(Hungary) Hungaroring	27 April	TCR Europe Touring Car Series; TCR Eastern Europe Trophy; KIA Platinum Cup
2	5	Race of Hungary	(Hungary) Hungaroring	28 April	TCR Europe Touring Car Series; TCR Eastern Europe Trophy; KIA Platinum Cup
2	6	Race of Hungary	(Hungary) Hungaroring	28 April	TCR Europe Touring Car Series; TCR Eastern Europe Trophy; KIA Platinum Cup
3	7	Race of Slovakia	Automotodróm Slovakia Ring	12 May	FIM Endurance World Championship
3	8	Race of Slovakia	Automotodróm Slovakia Ring	12 May	FIM Endurance World Championship
3	9	Race of Slovakia	Automotodróm Slovakia Ring	12 May	FIM Endurance World Championship
4	10	Race of the Netherlands	(Netherlands) Circuit Zandvoort	18 May	Mazda MX5 Cup; Superkarts; MAXX Formula; YTCC
4	11	Race of the Netherlands	(Netherlands) Circuit Zandvoort	19 May	Mazda MX5 Cup; Superkarts; MAXX Formula; YTCC
4	12	Race of the Netherlands	(Netherlands) Circuit Zandvoort	19 May	Mazda MX5 Cup; Superkarts; MAXX Formula; YTCC
5	13	Race of Germany	(Germany) Nürburgring Nordschleife	21 June	Nürburgring 24 Hours; Audi R8 LMS Cup
5	14	Race of Germany	(Germany) Nürburgring Nordschleife	22 June	Nürburgring 24 Hours; Audi R8 LMS Cup
5	15	Race of Germany	(Germany) Nürburgring Nordschleife	22 June	Nürburgring 24 Hours; Audi R8 LMS Cup
6	16	Race of Portugal	(Portugal) Circuito Internacional de Vila Real	6 July	GT4 South European Series; TCR Ibérico; Open Portugal Velocidade
6	17	Race of Portugal	(Portugal) Circuito Internacional de Vila Real	6 July	GT4 South European Series; TCR Ibérico; Open Portugal Velocidade
6	18	Race of Portugal	(Portugal) Circuito Internacional de Vila Real	7 July	GT4 South European Series; TCR Ibérico; Open Portugal Velocidade
7	19	Race of China	(China) Ningbo International Circuit	14 September	China Touring Car Championship; TCR China Touring Car Championship; KNMS Honda Cup
7	20	Race of China	(China) Ningbo International Circuit	15 September	China Touring Car Championship; TCR China Touring Car Championship; KNMS Honda Cup
7	21	Race of China	(China) Ningbo International Circuit	15 September	China Touring Car Championship; TCR China Touring Car Championship; KNMS Honda Cup
8	22	JVCKENWOOD Race of Japan	(Japan) Suzuka Circuit	26 October	Super Formula Championship; TCR Japan Touring Car Series
8	23	JVCKENWOOD Race of Japan	(Japan) Suzuka Circuit	27 October	Super Formula Championship; TCR Japan Touring Car Series
8	24	JVCKENWOOD Race of Japan	(Japan) Suzuka Circuit	27 October	Super Formula Championship; TCR Japan Touring Car Series
9	25	Guia Race of Macau	Guia Circuit, Macau	16 November	Macau Guia Race; Macau Grand Prix; FIA GT World Cup
9	26	Guia Race of Macau	Guia Circuit, Macau	17 November	Macau Guia Race; Macau Grand Prix; FIA GT World Cup
9	27	Guia Race of Macau	Guia Circuit, Macau	17 November	Macau Guia Race; Macau Grand Prix; FIA GT World Cup
10	28	Race of Malaysia	(Malaysia) Sepang International Circuit, Sepang	15 December	FIM Endurance World Championship; F3 Asian Championship; Formula 4 South East Asia Championship
10	29	Race of Malaysia	(Malaysia) Sepang International Circuit, Sepang	15 December	FIM Endurance World Championship; F3 Asian Championship; Formula 4 South East Asia Championship
10	30	Race of Malaysia	(Malaysia) Sepang International Circuit, Sepang	15 December	FIM Endurance World Championship; F3 Asian Championship; Formula 4 South East Asia Championship

=== Calendar changes ===
- The series made their first appearance in Malaysia, with the round held at the Sepang International Circuit as the season finale. The race supported the FIM Endurance World Championship.
- The second round in China, held at the Wuhan Street Circuit, was discontinued.
- The Race of Slovakia moved from July date to May date, running after Race of Hungary. This round will also support the FIM Endurance World Championship.
- The Race of Germany moved from May to June.
- In September 2019 it was announced that the Race of Japan would be held on Suzuka's East Course instead of full GP layout used previous year due to an inability to transition the circuit from motorcycles to cars and back in time. It takes a considerable number of weeks to transition the full circuit with special FIM-approved barriers for events under Motorcycle Federation of Japan sanction, and the FIM barriers cannot be used for cars. It marked a return of East Circuit to the schedule after the WTCR's predecessor – WTCC – ran the layout from 2011 to 2013.

== Rule changes ==
=== Sporting changes ===
- The grid capacity was increased from 26 to 32 entries. Teams are allowed to enter only two cars, while manufacturers are allowed to be represented by no more than 4 cars. Wildcard entries will not be eligible to score championship points.
- The point-scoring system will be overhauled for this season. Now both qualifying sessions will award points for the top 5 drivers and all three races will award an equal number of points for the top 15: 25, 20, 16, 13, 11, 10, 9, 8, 7, 6, 5, 4, 3, 2, 1.

== Results ==
Race	Race name	Pole position	Fastest lap	Winning driver	Winning team
1	Race of Morocco	(Argentina) Esteban Guerrieri	(Hungary) Attila Tassi	(Argentina) Esteban Guerrieri	(Germany) ALL-INKL.COM Münnich Motorsport
2	Race of Morocco		(United Kingdom) Robert Huff	(Italy) Gabriele Tarquini	(Italy) BRC Hyundai N Squadra Corse
3	Race of Morocco	(Belgium) Frédéric Vervisch	(Morocco) Mehdi Bennani	(Sweden) Thed Björk	(Sweden) Cyan Racing Lynk & Co
4	Race of Hungary	(Argentina) Néstor Girolami	(Belgium) Frédéric Vervisch	(Argentina) Néstor Girolami	(Germany) ALL-INKL.COM Münnich Motorsport
5	Race of Hungary		(Hungary) Attila Tassi	(Argentina) Néstor Girolami	(Germany) ALL-INKL.COM Münnich Motorsport
6	Race of Hungary	(Hungary) Norbert Michelisz	(United Kingdom) Robert Huff	(Italy) Gabriele Tarquini	(Italy) BRC Hyundai N Squadra Corse
7	Race of Slovakia	(Netherlands) Nick Catsburg	(Belgium) Frédéric Vervisch	(Belgium) Frédéric Vervisch	(Belgium) Audi Sport Team Comtoyou
8	Race of Slovakia		(Italy) Kevin Ceccon	(Argentina) Néstor Girolami	(Germany) ALL-INKL.COM Münnich Motorsport
9	Race of Slovakia	(Netherlands) Nick Catsburg	(China) Ma Qing Hua	(China) Ma Qing Hua	(Italy) Mulsanne Srl
10	Race of the Netherlands	(Sweden) Thed Björk	(Belgium) Frédéric Vervisch	(Sweden) Thed Björk	(Sweden) Cyan Racing Lynk & Co
11	Race of the Netherlands		(Germany) Benjamin Leuchter	(Argentina) Esteban Guerrieri	(Germany) ALL-INKL.COM Münnich Motorsport
12	Race of the Netherlands	(France) Yann Ehrlacher	(Morocco) Mehdi Bennani	(Sweden) Thed Björk	(Sweden) Cyan Racing Lynk & Co
13	Race of Germany	(Argentina) Esteban Guerrieri	(Argentina) Néstor Girolami	(Hungary) Norbert Michelisz	(Italy) BRC Hyundai N Squadra Corse
14	Race of Germany		(Sweden) Johan Kristoffersson	(Sweden) Johan Kristoffersson	(France) SLR Volkswagen
15	Race of Germany	(Germany) Benjamin Leuchter	(France) Jean-Karl Vernay	(Germany) Benjamin Leuchter	(France) SLR Volkswagen
16	Race of Portugal	(Hungary) Norbert Michelisz	(France) Yann Ehrlacher	(Hungary) Norbert Michelisz	(Italy) BRC Hyundai N Squadra Corse
17	Race of Portugal		(Spain) Mikel Azcona	(Spain) Mikel Azcona	(Sweden) PWR Racing
18	Race of Portugal	(Hungary) Attila Tassi	(Spain) Mikel Azcona	(Portugal) Tiago Monteiro	(Hong Kong) KCMG
19	Race of China	(France) Yvan Muller	(France) Aurélien Panis	(France) Yvan Muller	(Sweden) Cyan Racing Lynk & Co
20	Race of China		(Sweden) Daniel Haglöf	(Hungary) Norbert Michelisz	(Italy) BRC Hyundai N Squadra Corse
21	Race of China	(France) Yvan Muller	(Italy) Gabriele Tarquini	(France) Yvan Muller	(Sweden) Cyan Racing Lynk & Co
22	Race of Japan	(Portugal) Tiago Monteiro (Note: Tiago Monteiro claimed pole position, but received a three place grid penalty for slow driving during the qualifying session, but was entitled to keep his five championship points for pole position. Esteban Guerrieri, the second fastest driver in qualifying, started from pole position.)	(Argentina) Esteban Guerrieri	(Argentina) Esteban Guerrieri	(Germany) ALL-INKL.COM Münnich Motorsport
23	Race of Japan		(Hungary) Norbert Michelisz	(Hungary) Norbert Michelisz	(Italy) BRC Hyundai N Squadra Corse
24	Race of Japan	(Sweden) Johan Kristoffersson	(Sweden) Johan Kristoffersson	(Sweden) Johan Kristoffersson	(France) SLR Volkswagen
25	Race of Macau	(France) Yvan Muller	(Belgium) Frédéric Vervisch	(France) Yvan Muller	(Sweden) Cyan Racing Lynk & Co
26	Race of Macau		(Netherlands) Nick Catsburg	(France) Yvan Muller	(Sweden) Cyan Racing Lynk & Co
27	Race of Macau	(United Kingdom) Robert Huff	(United Kingdom) Andy Priaulx	(United Kingdom) Andy Priaulx	(Sweden) Cyan Performance Lynk & Co
28	Race of Malaysia	(Hungary) Norbert Michelisz	(Brazil) João Paulo de Oliveira	(Hungary) Norbert Michelisz	(Italy) BRC Hyundai N Squadra Corse
29	Race of Malaysia		(Argentina) Esteban Guerrieri	(Argentina) Esteban Guerrieri	(Germany) ALL-INKL.COM Münnich Motorsport
30	Race of Malaysia	(Hungary) Norbert Michelisz	(Argentina) Esteban Guerrieri	(Sweden) Johan Kristoffersson	(France) SLR Volkswagen

== Championship standings ==
Scoring system

Position	1st	2nd	3rd	4th	5th	6th	7th	8th	9th	10th	11th	12th	13th	14th	15th
Qualifying	5	4	3	2	1	—N/a									
Race	25	20	16	13	11	10	9	8	7	6	5	4	3	2	1

=== Drivers' championship ===
(key)

Pos.	Driver	MAR (Morocco)			HUN (Hungary)			SVK (Slovakia)			NLD (Netherlands)			GER (Germany)			PRT (Portugal)			CHN (China)			JPN (Japan)			MAC (Macau)			MAL (Malaysia)			Pts.
1	(Hungary) Norbert Michelisz	11	12	8	10	Ret	2^{1}	3^{2}	6	2^{2}	Ret	7	3^{3}	1^{2}	7	Ret^{4}	1^{1}	Ret	10	4^{4}	1	Ret	13	1	8	2^{2}	10	12	1^{1}	8	4^{1}	372
2	(Argentina) Esteban Guerrieri	1^{1}	4	4	3^{3}	5	Ret^{2}	15	2	6^{5}	11	1	8	2^{1}	6	3^{3}	24	3	Ret	19	Ret	Ret	1^{2}	10	2^{4}	24†	4	10	4	1	22^{2}	349
3	(France) Yvan Muller	18^{2}	7	Ret^{2}	2^{2}	6	Ret	11	11	14	2^{2}	9	5^{5}	Ret	15	10	9	6	2^{4}	1^{1}	3	1^{1}	11	14	13	1^{1}	1	6	6	6	11	331
4	(Sweden) Thed Björk	2^{3}	6	1^{3}	7	Ret	5	23	22	11	1^{1}	12	1^{2}	11^{5}	12	Ret	8	13	8	12	4	5	4	5	3	5	2	7	27	23	7	297
5	(Sweden) Johan Kristoffersson	Ret	17	17	8	Ret	22	20	15	18	4	3	7	10	1	Ret	7	14	11	8^{5}	12	10	5	7	1^{1}	11	5	4^{5}	8	3	1	243
6	(Spain) Mikel Azcona	15	5	3^{5}	22	4	4	9	7	5	3^{5}	5	6	18	13	13	13	1	4	3^{3}	Ret	Ret	17	8	18^{3}	19	15	20	17^{4}	2	14^{3}	226
7	(Argentina) Néstor Girolami	3^{4}	10	6	1^{1}	1	6^{5}	Ret	1	24	14	10	14	3^{3}	24	18	11	9	7	15	Ret	8	18^{3}	11	12	14	19	17	22^{3}	4	5	225
8	(Italy) Gabriele Tarquini	4	1	5	13	17	1^{4}	6	19	9	20	13	9	Ret	23	5^{5}	Ret	Ret	15	Ret	2	3	7	3	4	9	11	Ret	3	26	18^{5}	222
9	(France) Yann Ehrlacher	8	3	Ret	Ret^{5}	Ret	3^{3}	22	17	20	7^{4}	8	2^{1}	6	Ret	Ret	2^{3}	8	3^{3}	13	14	2^{2}	12	15	19	8^{5}	6	8	14	7	16	222
10	(France) Jean-Karl Vernay	7	2	Ret	4	2	10	4	12	Ret	22	15	25	12	9	4	10	4	5	16	10	Ret	6	9	9	21	9	3^{3}	10	14	10	211
11	(United Kingdom) Robert Huff	12	22	15	14	7	7	13	5	13	Ret	11	10	4	Ret	DNS^{2}	4^{4}	7	6^{5}	10	7	Ret	10	2	7	4	14	2^{1}	23	9	9	211
12	(Belgium) Frédéric Vervisch	17	9	2^{1}	6	15	12	1	Ret	21	9	21	16	5^{4}	2	2	20	12	Ret	11	Ret	7	Ret^{5}	13	11	7	8	15	Ret^{5}	25	3	194
13	(Netherlands) Nick Catsburg	10	Ret	DNS	23	10	9	7^{1}	4	12^{1}	10	4	11	9	DSQ	8	5	5	Ret	5	15	Ret^{4}	23	18	14	10	12	5^{4}	9	Ret	DSQ^{4}	166
14	(Italy) Kevin Ceccon	9	19	16	19	16	Ret	Ret	3	3	18	20	18	19	19	11	19	Ret	13	17	9	9	8	4	6	3^{4}	3	9	19	5	2	164
15	(Brazil) Augusto Farfus	13	11	Ret	9	9	8	5	21	7	Ret	6	4^{4}	8	3	Ret	3^{2}	Ret	Ret	7	Ret	4	15	21	22				28	19	Ret	142
16	(China) Ma Qing Hua	Ret	Ret	9	25	11	19	2^{3}	9	1^{3}	21	25	21	21	22	15	14^{5}	2	9	2^{2}	Ret	16†	9	23	Ret	Ret	17	22	18	17	23	133
17	(France) Aurélien Panis	Ret	21	19	5^{4}	13	11	Ret	Ret	8	13	14	12	17	8	7	6	16	12	6	Ret	6^{3}	14	19	17	12	Ret	23	2^{2}	11	Ret	127
18	(United Kingdom) Andy Priaulx	5^{5}	13	13	12	Ret	20	21	18	22	5^{3}	18	15	22	18	19	12	15	19	14	16†	11	25†	16	5^{5}	6^{3}	7	1^{2}	11	21	12	122
19	(Germany) Benjamin Leuchter	16	23	20	20	12	17	14	Ret	16	8	2	Ret	7	5	1^{1}	16	17	18	18	Ret	DNS	Ret	12	10	22	21	21	16	10	8	111
20	(Portugal) Tiago Monteiro	6	8	Ret^{4}	18	Ret	16	17	16	17	19	23	19	16	14	17	23	10	1^{2}	21	Ret	Ret	3^{1}	6	15^{2}	15	18	19	Ret	12	6	109
21	(Netherlands) Niels Langeveld	Ret	18	18	24	Ret	18	16	8	4	15	17	17	14	20	12	15	18	16	9	DNS	Ret	2^{4}	Ret	25†	Ret	16	13	21	15	20	63
22	(Netherlands) Tom Coronel	Ret	14	14	17	14	13	8^{5}	10	23	16	24	20	13	10	6	18	DSQ	17	24	8	12	16	22	Ret	20	13	11	24	20	Ret	63
23	(Sweden) Daniel Haglöf	20	16	10	11	3	24	19^{4}	20	Ret^{4}	12	19	23	Ret	17	Ret	25	21	Ret	Ret	5	Ret	20	26	24†				7	Ret	13	59
24	(Hungary) Attila Tassi	19	20	11	15	8	14	18	Ret	25	DSQ	Ret	22	20	4	Ret	21	11	Ret^{1}	23	6	13	21	24	16	18	22†	16	13	Ret	DNS	56
25	(Morocco) Mehdi Bennani	Ret	Ret	12	16	Ret	15	Ret	14	19	6	16	13	15	16	16	22	19	14	20	11	14	24	27	Ret	17	Ret	18	12	13	17	40
26	(United Kingdom) Gordon Shedden	14	15	7	Ret	Ret	21	12	13	15	17	22	24	Ret	21	9	17	20	Ret	22	13	15	Ret	20	20	WD	WD	WD	15	27†	Ret	35
27	(Sweden) Robert Dahlgren																									13	20	24				3
28	(Germany) Luca Engstler																									16	Ret	14				2
Wildcard entries ineligible for points
	(Brazil) João Paulo de Oliveira																												5	18	Ret	-
	(Germany) Luca Engstler							10	Ret	10																						-
	(Finland) Antti Buri													23	11	14																-
	(Malaysia) Hafizh Syahrin																												25	22	15	-
	(Malaysia) Mitchell Cheah																												19	16	19	-
	(Japan) Ryuichiro Tomita																						19	17	23†							-
	(Hungary) Tamás Tenke				21	18	23																									-
	(Hong Kong) Jim Ka To																						22	28	21	WD	WD	WD				-
	(Malaysia) Douglas Khoo																												26	24	21	-
	(Macau) Billy Lo																									23	Ret	25				-
	(Japan) Ritomo Miyata																						Ret	25	Ret							-
	(Hong Kong) Anson Wong																									DNQ	DNQ	DNQ				-
	(Hong Kong) Terence Tse																									DNQ	DNQ	DNQ				-
	(Hong Kong) James Tang																									DNQ	DNQ	DNQ				-
	(Hong Kong) Arthur Law																									DNQ	DNQ	DNQ				-
Pos.	Driver	MAR (Morocco)			HUN (Hungary)			SVK (Slovakia)			NLD (Netherlands)			GER (Germany)			PRT (Portugal)			CHN (China)			JPN (Japan)			MAC (Macau)			MAL (Malaysia)			Pts.

† – Drivers did not finish the race, but were classified as they completed over 75% of the race distance.

=== Teams' championship ===
(key)

Pos.	Team	No.	MAR (Morocco)			HUN (Hungary)			SVK (Slovakia)			NLD (Netherlands)			GER (Germany)			PRT (Portugal)			CHN (China)			JPN (Japan)			MAC (Macau)			MAL (Malaysia)			Pts.
1	(Sweden) Cyan Racing Lynk & Co	11	2^{3}	6	1^{3}	7	Ret	5	23	22	11	1^{1}	12	1^{2}	11^{5}	12	Ret	8	13	8	12	4	5	4	5	3	5	2	7	27	23	7	628
1	(Sweden) Cyan Racing Lynk & Co	100	18^{2}	7	Ret^{2}	2^{2}	6	Ret	11	11	14	2^{2}	9	5^{5}	Ret	15	10	9	6	2^{4}	1^{1}	3	1^{1}	11	14	13	1^{1}	1	6	6	6	11	628
2	(Italy) BRC Hyundai N Squadra Corse	1	4	1	5	13	17	1^{4}	6	19	9	20	13	9	Ret	23	5^{5}	Ret	Ret	15	Ret	2	3	7	3	4	9	11	Ret	3	26	18^{5}	594
2	(Italy) BRC Hyundai N Squadra Corse	5	11	12	8	10	Ret	2^{1}	3^{2}	6	2^{2}	Ret	7	3^{3}	1^{2}	7	Ret^{4}	1^{1}	Ret	10	4^{4}	1	Ret	13	1	8	2^{2}	10	12	1^{1}	8	4^{1}	594
3	(Germany) ALL-INKL.COM Münnich Motorsport	29	3^{4}	10	6	1^{1}	1	6^{5}	Ret	1	24	14	10	14	3^{3}	24	18	11	9	7	15	Ret	8	18^{3}	11	12	14	19	17	22^{3}	4	5	574
3	(Germany) ALL-INKL.COM Münnich Motorsport	86	1^{1}	4	4	3^{3}	5	Ret^{2}	15	2	6^{5}	11	1	8	2^{1}	6	3^{3}	24	3	Ret	19	Ret	Ret	1^{2}	10	2^{4}	24†	4	10	4	1	22^{2}	574
4	(France) SLR Volkswagen	14	Ret	17	17	8	Ret	22	20	15	18	4	3	7	10	1	Ret	7	14	11	8^{5}	12	10	5	7	1^{1}	11	5	4^{5}	8	3	1	354
4	(France) SLR Volkswagen	33	16	23	20	20	12	17	14	Ret	16	8	2	Ret	7	5	1^{1}	16	17	18	18	Ret	DNS	Ret	12	10	22	21	21	16	10	8	354
5	(Sweden) Cyan Performance Lynk & Co	68	8	3	Ret	Ret^{5}	Ret	3^{3}	22	17	20	7^{4}	8	2^{1}	6	Ret	Ret	2^{3}	8	3^{3}	13	14	2^{2}	12	15	19	8^{5}	6	8	14	7	16	344
5	(Sweden) Cyan Performance Lynk & Co	111	5^{5}	13	13	12	Ret	20	21	18	22	5^{3}	18	15	22	18	19	12	15	19	14	16†	11	25†	16	5^{5}	6^{3}	7	1^{2}	11	21	12	344
6	(Italy) BRC Hyundai N LUKOIL Racing Team	6																									16	Ret	14				310
6	(Italy) BRC Hyundai N LUKOIL Racing Team	8	13	11	Ret	9	9	8	5	21	7	Ret	6	4^{4}	8	3	Ret	3^{2}	Ret	Ret	7	Ret	4	15	21	22				28	19	Ret	310
6	(Italy) BRC Hyundai N LUKOIL Racing Team	88	10	Ret	DNS	23	10	9	7^{1}	4	12^{1}	10	4	11	9	DSQ	8	5	5	Ret	5	15	Ret^{4}	23	18	14	10	12	5^{4}	9	Ret	DSQ^{4}	310
7	(Italy) Team Mulsanne	31	9	19	16	19	16	Ret	Ret	3	3	18	20	18	19	19	11	19	Ret	13	17	9	9	8	4	6	3^{4}	3	9	19	5	2	297
7	(Italy) Team Mulsanne	55	Ret	Ret	9	25	11	19	2^{3}	9	1^{3}	21	25	21	21	22	15	14^{5}	2	9	2^{2}	Ret	16†	9	23	Ret	Ret	17	22	18	17	23	297
8	(Sweden) PWR Racing	2																									13	20	24				288
8	(Sweden) PWR Racing	37	20	16	10	11	3	24	19^{4}	20	Ret^{4}	12	19	23	Ret	17	Ret	25	21	Ret	Ret	5	Ret	20	26	24†				7	Ret	13	288
8	(Sweden) PWR Racing	96	15	5	3^{5}	22	4	4	9	7	5	3^{5}	5	6	18	13	13	13	1	4	3^{3}	Ret	Ret	17	8	18^{3}	19	15	20	17^{4}	2	14^{3}	288
9	(Belgium) Audi Sport Team Comtoyou	10	Ret	18	18	24	Ret	18	16	8	4	15	17	17	14	20	12	15	18	16	9	DNS	Ret	2^{4}	Ret	25†	Ret	16	13	21	15	20	257
9	(Belgium) Audi Sport Team Comtoyou	22	17	9	2^{1}	6	15	12	1	Ret	21	9	21	16	5^{4}	2	2	20	12	Ret	11	Ret	7	Ret^{5}	13	11	7	8	15	Ret^{5}	25	3	257
10	(France) SLR VW Motorsport	12	12	22	15	14	7	7	13	5	13	Ret	11	10	4	Ret	DNS^{2}	4^{4}	7	6^{5}	10	7	Ret	10	2	7	4	14	2^{1}	23	9	9	251
10	(France) SLR VW Motorsport	25	Ret	Ret	12	16	Ret	15	Ret	14	19	6	16	13	15	16	16	22	19	14	20	11	14	24	27	Ret	17	Ret	18	12	13	17	251
11	(Luxembourg) Audi Sport Team Leopard Racing	52	14	15	7	Ret	Ret	21	12	13	15	17	22	24	Ret	21	9	17	20	Ret	22	13	15	Ret	20	20	WD	WD	WD	15	27†	Ret	246
11	(Luxembourg) Audi Sport Team Leopard Racing	69	7	2	Ret	4	2	10	4	12	Ret	22	15	25	12	9	4	10	4	5	16	10	Ret	6	9	9	21	9	3^{3}	10	14	10	246
12	(Belgium) Comtoyou Team DHL CUPRA Racing	21	Ret	21	19	5^{4}	13	11	Ret	Ret	8	13	14	12	17	8	7	6	16	12	6	Ret	6^{3}	14	19	17	12	Ret	23	2^{2}	11	Ret	190
12	(Belgium) Comtoyou Team DHL CUPRA Racing	50	Ret	14	14	17	14	13	8^{5}	10	23	16	24	20	13	10	6	18	DSQ	17	24	8	12	16	22	Ret	20	13	11	24	20	Ret	190
13	(Hong Kong) KCMG	9	19	20	11	15	8	14	18	Ret	25	DSQ	Ret	22	20	4	Ret	21	11	Ret^{1}	23	6	13	21	24	16	18	22†	16	13	Ret	DNS	165
13	(Hong Kong) KCMG	18	6	8	Ret^{4}	18	Ret	16	17	16	17	19	23	19	16	14	17	23	10	1^{2}	21	Ret	Ret	3^{1}	6	15^{2}	15	18	19	Ret	12	6	165
Wildcard entries ineligible to score points
	(Hong Kong) KCMG	19																						22	28	21	WD	WD	WD				-
	(Hong Kong) KCMG	38																												5	18	Ret	-
	(Germany) Hyundai Team Engstler	6							10	Ret	10																						-
	(Germany) Hyundai Team Engstler	15																												25	22	15	-
	(Germany) Hyundai Team Engstler	27																												19	16	19	-
	(Finland) AS Motorsport	13													23	11	15																-
	(Japan) Audi Sport Team Hitotsuyama	7																						19	17	23†							-
	(Japan) Audi Sport Team Hitotsuyama	77																						Ret	25	Ret							-
	(Hungary) Zengõ Motorsport	23				21	18	23																									-
	(Malaysia) Viper Niza Racing	65																												26	24	21	-
	(China) Tian Shi Zuver Team	36																									23	Ret	25				-
	(Macau) Son Veng Racing Team	59																									DNQ	DNQ	DNQ				-
	(Hong Kong) Team TRC	97																									DNQ	DNQ	DNQ				-
	(Hong Kong) Team TRC	98																									DNQ	DNQ	DNQ				-
	(Hong Kong) Team TRC	99																									DNQ	DNQ	DNQ				-
Pos.	Team	No.	MAR (Morocco)			HUN (Hungary)			SVK (Slovakia)			NLD (Netherlands)			GER (Germany)			PRT (Portugal)			CHN (China)			JPN (Japan)			MAC (Macau)			MAL (Malaysia)			Pts.

† – Drivers did not finish the race, but were classified as they completed over 75% of the race distance.
