= Kevin Ceccon =

Italian racing driver

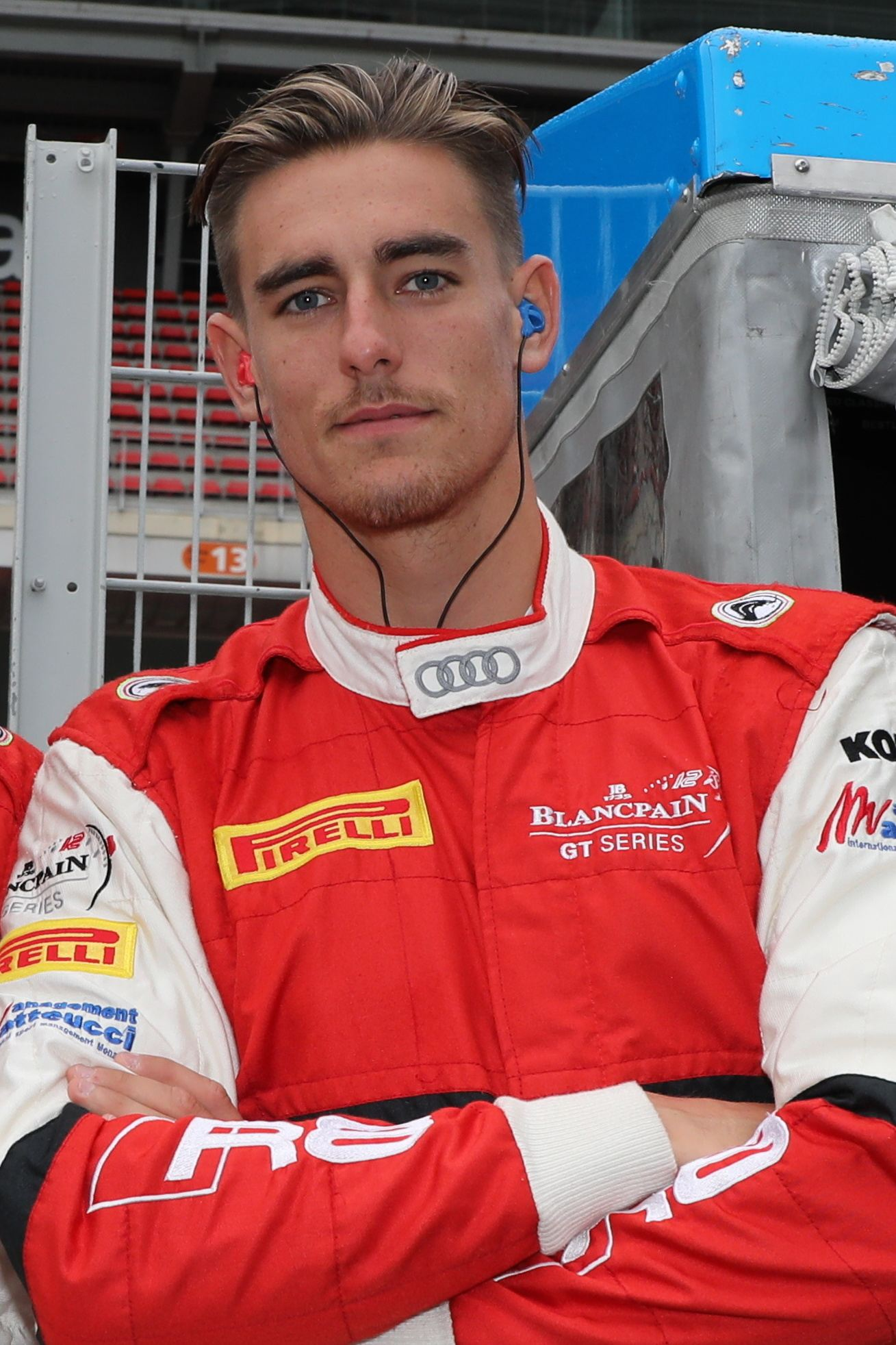
- Nationality: (Italy) Italian
- Born: 24 September 1993 (age 33) Clusone, Italy

GP3 Series career
- Debut season: 2012
- Current team: Arden International
- Categorisation: FIA Gold
- Car number: 14
- Former teams: Ocean Racing Technology; Jenzer Motorsport
- Starts: 41
- Wins: 2
- Poles: 0
- Fastest laps: 3
- Best finish: 7th in 2015

Previous series
- 2011, 13 2011 2009–10 2009–10: GP2 Series; Auto GP; European F3 Open; Italian Formula Three

Championship titles
- 2011: Auto GP

Kevin Ceccon (born 24 September 1993 in Clusone) is an Italian professional racing driver.

== Career ==
=== Karting ===
Prior to his single–seater career, Ceccon enjoyed a long and successful spell in the junior karting ranks. In 2005, he achieved a fifth place in the Copa Campeones Trophy Junior class before finishing fourth in the Italian Open Masters KF3 category the following year. In 2008, he won the Italian Open Masters KF3 title, and also secured podium finishes in both the South Garda Winter Cup and Andrea Margutti Trophy.

=== Formula Three ===
In 2009, Ceccon took the substantial jump from karting to Formula Three, racing in the European F3 Open Championship with RP Motorsport. After a slow start to the season, he finished in the points on nine occasions to be classified 11th in the standings, with fourth–place finishes at Donington Park and Monza being his best race results. He also took part in three rounds of the Italian Formula Three season, finishing in the points in four of his six races to finish 14th in the series.

Ceccon continued with the team for a second season in 2010, improving to fourth place in the final standings after taking six podium places, including his first series win at the final round of the year in Barcelona. In September 2010, Ceccon made a one–off appearance in the Italian Formula Three Championship round at Vallelunga, retiring from the first race before finishing 12th in the second event.

=== GP2 Series ===
In November 2010, Ceccon took part in four days of post–season GP2 Series testing, held at Yas Marina Circuit in Abu Dhabi, driving for Scuderia Coloni for the first two days, before switching to DPR for the final two days.

It was announced in May 2011 that Ceccon would race in the Barcelona and Monaco rounds of the 2011 season for Scuderia Coloni, replacing fellow Italian Davide Rigon who was injured in the first round of the season in Istanbul. In doing so, he became the youngest ever GP2 Series driver, taking the record previously held by Spaniard Javier Villa by almost a year. After eight races, with a best finish of eleventh, he opted to concentrate on Auto GP, in which he was challenging for the series lead, and relinquished his seat to Luca Filippi. He finished 30th in the drivers' championship standings.

=== Auto GP ===
For the 2011 season, Ceccon graduated to the Auto GP championship, racing for Italian team Ombra Racing. He was eligible for the newly created Under 21 Trophy, which he won at the penultimate round of the season in Valencia. In doing so, he also secured a prize GP2 Series test. He currently leads the overall standings with one round of the series remaining, seven points ahead of DAMS driver Sergei Afanasiev.

=== GP3 Series ===
Ceccon moved to the GP3 Series for 2012, driving for Ocean Racing Technology.

Ceccon returned to GP3 in 2014, replacing Christopher Höher at Jenzer Motorsport. Despite only competing in four rounds out of nine, he finished fifteenth in the standings.

=== Formula One ===
Ceccon tested with Toro Rosso at the 2011 Abu Dhabi young driver test during the week after the Grand Prix there. He drove on the second day of the test (November 16), after Stefano Coletti drove on the first, and finished the day with the tenth fastest time, 4.620s behind Jean-Éric Vergne, who set the fastest time.

== Racing record ==
=== Career summary ===
| Season | Series | Team | Races | Wins | Poles | F/Laps | Podiums | Points | Position |
|---|---|---|---|---|---|---|---|---|---|
| 2009 | European F3 Open Championship | RP Motorsport | 16 | 0 | 0 | 0 | 0 | 34 | 11th |
| 2009 | Italian Formula 3 Championship | RP Motorsport | 6 | 0 | 0 | 0 | 0 | 11 | 14th |
| 2010 | European F3 Open Championship | RP Motorsport | 16 | 1 | 0 | 0 | 6 | 92 | 4th |
| 2010 | Italian Formula 3 Championship | RP Motorsport | 2 | 0 | 0 | 0 | 0 | 0 | 28th |
| 2011 | Auto GP | Ombra Racing | 14 | 1 | 0 | 3 | 5 | 130 | **1st** |
| 2011 | GP2 Series | Scuderia Coloni | 8 | 0 | 0 | 0 | 0 | 0 | 30th |
| 2011 | GP2 Final | Scuderia Coloni | 2 | 0 | 0 | 0 | 0 | 5 | 7th |
| 2011 | Formula One | Scuderia Toro Rosso | Test driver | | | | | | |
| 2012 | GP3 Series | Ocean Racing Technology | 16 | 0 | 0 | 2 | 1 | 56 | 9th |
| 2013 | GP2 Series | Trident Racing | 11 | 0 | 0 | 0 | 1 | 28 | 17th |
| 2014 | GP3 Series | Jenzer Motorsport | 8 | 0 | 0 | 0 | 0 | 20 | 15th |
| 2015 | GP3 Series | Arden International | 18 | 2 | 0 | 1 | 3 | 77 | 7th |
| 2016 | European Le Mans Series - LMP2 | Murphy Prototypes | 1 | 0 | 0 | 0 | 0 | 2 | 33rd |
| 2017 | Blancpain GT Series Sprint Cup | ISR | 10 | 0 | 0 | 0 | 0 | 0 | NC |
| 2017 | Blancpain GT Series Endurance Cup | ISR | 1 | 0 | 0 | 0 | 0 | 4 | 39th |
| 2017 | Blancpain GT Series Endurance Cup | Team Zakspeed | 1 | 0 | 0 | 0 | 0 | 4 | 39th |
| 2018 | World Touring Car Cup | Team Mulsanne | 15 | 1 | 1 | 1 | 2 | 102 | 14th |
| 2019 | World Touring Car Cup | Team Mulsanne | 30 | 0 | 0 | 1 | 5 | 164 | 14th |
| 2021 | TCR Italy Touring Car Championship | Aggressive Italia | 12 | 4 | 0 | 1 | 6 | 357 | **2nd** |
| 2022 | FIA ETCR – eTouring Car World Cup | Hyundai Motorsport N | 2 | 0 | 0 | 0 | 0 | 67 | 13th |
| 2022 | TCR Italy Touring Car Championship | Hyundai N Team Aggressive Italia | 6 | 0 | 0 | 0 | 4 | 192 | NC† |
| 2023 | TCR World Tour | Aggressive Team Italia | 4 | 0 | 0 | 0 | 0 | 23 | 24th |
| 2023 | TCR Europe Touring Car Series | Aggressive Team Italia | 2 | 0 | 0 | 0 | 2 | 63 | 16th |

^{†} Ceccon was ineligible for a championship position. ^{*} Season still in progress.

=== Complete Auto GP results ===
(key) (Races in bold indicate pole position) (Races in italics indicate fastest lap)

| Year | Entrant | 1 | 2 | 3 | 4 | 5 | 6 | 7 | 8 | 9 | 10 | 11 | 12 | 13 | 14 | Pos | Points |
|---|---|---|---|---|---|---|---|---|---|---|---|---|---|---|---|---|---|
| 2011 | Ombra Racing | MNZ; 1; 5 | MNZ; 2; 3 | HUN; 1; 1 | HUN; 2; 10 | BRN; 1; 3 | BRN; 2; 7 | DON; 1; 4 | DON; 2; 6 | OSC; 1; 3 | OSC; 2; 6 | VAL; 1; 3 | VAL; 2; 8 | MUG; 1; 4 | MUG; 2; 7 | 1st | 130 |

=== Complete GP2 Series results ===
(key) (Races in bold indicate pole position) (Races in italics indicate fastest lap)

| Year | Entrant | 1 | 2 | 3 | 4 | 5 | 6 | 7 | 8 | 9 | 10 | 11 | 12 | 13 | 14 | 15 | 16 | 17 | 18 | 19 | 20 | 21 | 22 | DC | Points |
|---|---|---|---|---|---|---|---|---|---|---|---|---|---|---|---|---|---|---|---|---|---|---|---|---|---|
| 2011 | Scuderia Coloni | IST; FEA | IST; SPR | CAT; FEA; 19 | CAT; SPR; 15 | MON; FEA; 11 | MON; SPR; 12 | VAL; FEA; 18 | VAL; SPR; 20 | SIL; FEA; 19 | SIL; SPR; Ret | NÜR; FEA | NÜR; SPR | HUN; FEA | HUN; SPR | SPA; FEA | SPA; SPR | MNZ; FEA | MNZ; SPR | | | | | 30th | 0 |
| 2013 | Trident Racing | SEP; FEA; 17 | SEP; SPR; 22 | BHR; FEA; 11 | BHR; SPR; 10 | CAT; FEA; 7 | CAT; SPR; 7 | MON; FEA; 2 | MON; SPR; 7 | SIL; FEA; Ret | SIL; SPR; 12 | NÜR; FEA; Ret | NÜR; SPR; DNS | HUN; FEA | HUN; SPR | SPA; FEA | SPA; SPR | MNZ; FEA | MNZ; SPR | MRN; FEA | MRN; SPR | YMC; FEA | YMC; SPR | 17th | 28 |

==== Complete GP2 Final results ====
(key) (Races in bold indicate pole position) (Races in italics indicate fastest lap)

| Year | Entrant | 1 | 2 | DC | Points |
|---|---|---|---|---|---|
| 2011 | Scuderia Coloni | YMC; FEA; 5 | YMC; SPR; 6 | 7th | 5 |

=== Complete GP3 Series results ===
(key) (Races in bold indicate pole position) (Races in italics indicate fastest lap)

| Year | Entrant | 1 | 2 | 3 | 4 | 5 | 6 | 7 | 8 | 9 | 10 | 11 | 12 | 13 | 14 | 15 | 16 | 17 | 18 | DC | Points |
|---|---|---|---|---|---|---|---|---|---|---|---|---|---|---|---|---|---|---|---|---|---|
| 2012 | Ocean Racing Technology | CAT; FEA; Ret | CAT; SPR; 10 | MON; FEA; 3 | MON; SPR; 6 | VAL; FEA; 7 | VAL; SPR; 4 | SIL; FEA; 8 | SIL; SPR; 7 | HOC; FEA; 17 | HOC; SPR; 15 | HUN; FEA; 4 | HUN; SPR; 8 | SPA; FEA; 12 | SPA; SPR; 20 | MNZ; FEA; 13 | MNZ; SPR; 9 | | | 9th | 56 |
| 2014 | Jenzer Motorsport | CAT; FEA | CAT; SPR | RBR; FEA | RBR; SPR | SIL; FEA | SIL; SPR | HOC; FEA | HOC; SPR | HUN; FEA | HUN; SPR | SPA; FEA; 11 | SPA; SPR; 11 | MNZ; FEA; 12 | MNZ; SPR; 6 | SOC; FEA; 5 | SOC; SPR; Ret | YMC; FEA; 9 | YMC; SPR; 6 | 15th | 20 |
| 2015 | Arden International | CAT; FEA; 7 | CAT; SPR; 6 | RBR; FEA; Ret | RBR; SPR; DNS | SIL; FEA; 7 | SIL; SPR; 1 | HUN; FEA; 7 | HUN; SPR; 1 | SPA; FEA; Ret | SPA; SPR; 13 | MNZ; FEA; 3 | MNZ; SPR; 4 | SOC; FEA; Ret | SOC; SPR; DNS | BHR; FEA; 14 | BHR; SPR; 18 | YMC; FEA; Ret | YMC; SPR; 10 | 7th | 77 |

=== Complete European Le Mans Series results ===
| Year | Entrant | Class | Chassis | Engine | 1 | 2 | 3 | 4 | 5 | 6 | Rank | Points |
|---|---|---|---|---|---|---|---|---|---|---|---|---|
| 2016 | Murphy Prototypes | LMP2 | Oreca 03R | Nissan VK45DE 4.5 L V8 | SIL | IMO | RBR | LEC; 9 | SPA | EST | 33rd | 2 |

=== Complete Blancpain GT Series Sprint Cup results ===
| Year | Team | Car | Class | 1 | 2 | 3 | 4 | 5 | 6 | 7 | 8 | 9 | 10 | Pos. | Points |
|---|---|---|---|---|---|---|---|---|---|---|---|---|---|---|---|
| 2017 | ISR | Audi R8 LMS | Pro | MIS; QR; 21 | MIS; CR; 25 | BRH; QR; 10 | BRH; CR; Ret | ZOL; QR; 28 | ZOL; CR; 30 | HUN; QR; 26 | HUN; CR; 14 | NÜR; QR; Ret | NÜR; CR; Ret | NC | 0 |

=== Complete World Touring Car Cup results ===
(key) (Races in bold indicate pole position) (Races in italics indicate fastest lap)

| Year | Team | Car | 1 | 2 | 3 | 4 | 5 | 6 | 7 | 8 | 9 | 10 | 11 | 12 | 13 | 14 | 15 | 16 | 17 | 18 | 19 | 20 | 21 | 22 | 23 | 24 | 25 | 26 | 27 | 28 | 29 | 30 | DC | Points |
|---|---|---|---|---|---|---|---|---|---|---|---|---|---|---|---|---|---|---|---|---|---|---|---|---|---|---|---|---|---|---|---|---|---|---|
| 2018 | Team Mulsanne | Alfa Romeo Giulietta TCR | MAR; 1 | MAR; 2 | MAR; 3 | HUN; 1 | HUN; 2 | HUN; 3 | GER; 1 | GER; 2 | GER; 3 | NED; 1 | NED; 2 | NED; 3 | POR; 1 | POR; 2 | POR; 3 | SVK; 1; 16 | SVK; 2; 11 | SVK; 3; 6 | CHN; 1; 12 | CHN; 2; 12 | CHN; 3; 14 | WUH; 1; 6 | WUH; 2; 11 | WUH; 3; 8 | JPN; 1; 1 | JPN; 2; 6 | **JPN**; **3**; 3 | MAC; 1 Ret | MAC; 2; 4 | MAC; 3; 7 | 14th | 102 |
| 2019 | Team Mulsanne | Alfa Romeo Giulietta Veloce TCR | MAR; 1; 9 | MAR; 2; 19 | MAR; 3; 16 | HUN; 1; 19 | HUN; 2; 16 | HUN; 3 Ret | SVK; 1 Ret | SVK; 2; 3 | SVK; 3; 3 | NED; 1; 18 | NED; 2; 20 | NED; 3; 18 | GER; 1; 19 | GER; 2; 19 | GER; 3; 11 | POR; 1; 18 | POR; 2 Ret | POR; 3; 12 | CHN; 1; 17 | CHN; 2; 9 | CHN; 3; 9 | JPN; 1; 8 | JPN; 2; 4 | JPN; 3; 6 | MAC; 1; 3 | MAC; 2; 3 | MAC; 3; 9 | MAL; 1; 19 | MAL; 2; 5 | MAL; 3; 2 | 14th | 164 |

=== Complete TCR World Tour results ===
(key) (Races in bold indicate pole position) (Races in italics indicate fastest lap)

| Year | Team | Car | 1 | 2 | 3 | 4 | 5 | 6 | 7 | 8 | 9 | 10 | 11 | 12 | 13 | 14 | 15 | 16 | 17 | 18 | 19 | 20 | DC | Points |
|---|---|---|---|---|---|---|---|---|---|---|---|---|---|---|---|---|---|---|---|---|---|---|---|---|
| 2023 | Aggressive Team Italia | Hyundai Elantra N TCR | ALG; 1 | ALG; 2 | SPA; 1 | SPA; 2 | VAL; 1; 13 | VAL; 2; 9 | HUN; 1; 12 | HUN; 2; 11 | ELP; 1 | ELP; 2 | VIL; 1 | VIL; 2 | SYD; 1 | SYD; 2 | SYD; 3 | BAT; 1 | BAT; 2 | BAT; 3 | MAC; 1 | MAC; 2 | 24th | 23 |

=== Complete TCR Europe Touring Car Series results ===
(key) (Races in bold indicate pole position) (Races in italics indicate fastest lap)

| Year | Team | Car | 1 | 2 | 3 | 4 | 5 | 6 | 7 | 8 | 9 | 10 | 11 | 12 | 13 | 14 | DC | Points |
|---|---|---|---|---|---|---|---|---|---|---|---|---|---|---|---|---|---|---|
| 2023 | Aggressive Team Italia | Hyundai Elantra N TCR | ALG; 1 | ALG; 2 | PAU; 1 | PAU; 2 | SPA; 1 | SPA; 2 | HUN; 1; 12^{5} | HUN; 2; 11 | LEC; 1 | LEC; 2 | MNZ; 1 | MNZ; 2 | CAT; 1 | CAT; 2 | 16th | 63 |

Sporting positions
| Preceded by Romain Grosjean | Auto GP; Drivers' Champion; 2011 | Succeeded by Adrian Quaife-Hobbs; Auto GP World Series |
