= Alfa Romeo Giulietta (2010) =

Italian compact hatchback

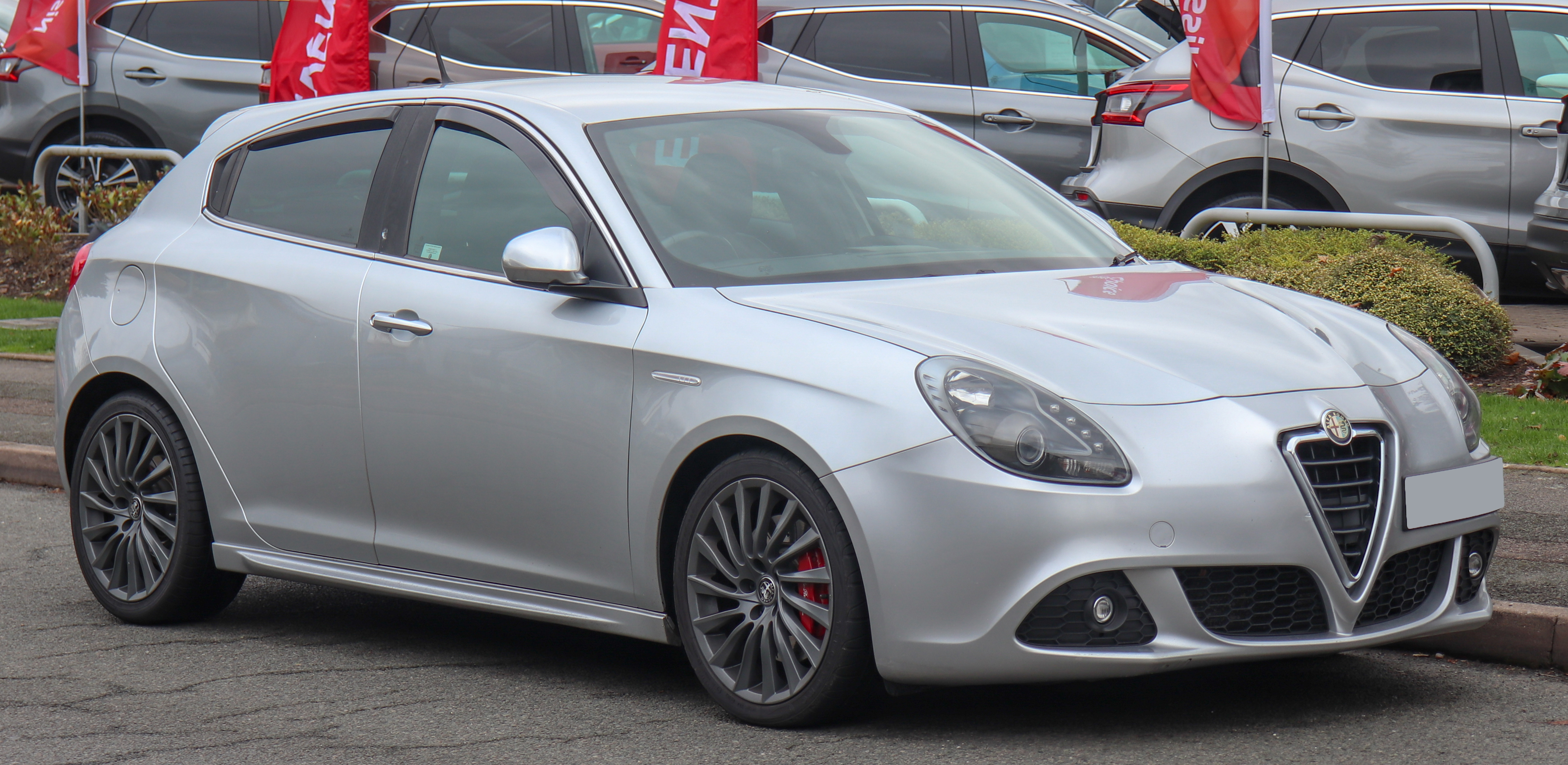

Overview
- Manufacturer: Alfa Romeo (Note: Fiat Group Automobiles (2010–2014) FCA Italy (2014–2020))
- Model code: 940
- Production: 2010 – December 2020 (469,067 produced)
- Assembly: Italy: Piedimonte San Germano, Lazio (Cassino Plant)
- Designer: Lorenzo Ramaciotti at Centro Stile Alfa Romeo

Body and chassis
- Class: Small family car (C)
- Body style: 5-door hatchback
- Layout: Front-engine, front-wheel-drive
- Platform: Fiat Compact platform
- Related: Dodge Dart; Jeep Cherokee; Chrysler 200

Powertrain
- Engine: 1.4 L Fiat FIRE I4 TB petrol/LPG 16V; 1.4 L Fiat FIRE I4 TB petrol 16V (MultiAir); 1.75 L Fiat I4 TBi 16V petrol (Fiat Pratola Serra modular); 1.6 L FCA I4 common rail turbo diesel 16V (JTDm); 2.0 L FCA I4 common rail turbo-diesel 16V (JTDm)
- Transmission: 6-speed manual 6-speed FPT Industrial TCT C635

Dimensions
- Wheelbase: 2,634 mm (103.7 in)
- Length: 4,351 mm (171.3 in)
- Width: 1,798 mm (70.8 in)
- Height: 1,465 mm (57.7 in)
- Curb weight: 1,355–1,395 kg (2,987–3,075 lb)

Chronology
- Predecessor: Alfa Romeo 147
- Successor: Alfa Romeo Tonale

The Alfa Romeo Giulietta (Type 940) is a hatchback manufactured and marketed by Alfa Romeo, as a 5-door small family car. Production started near the end of 2009 and the model was introduced at the March 2010 Geneva Motor Show. The Giulietta placed second in the 2011 European Car of the Year awards. In 2020, Alfa Romeo announced that they were going to axe the Giulietta and production ended on 22 December 2020 spanning 10 years of sales from a period of 2010 to 2020. In total 469,067 examples were produced until 2020.

== Overview ==
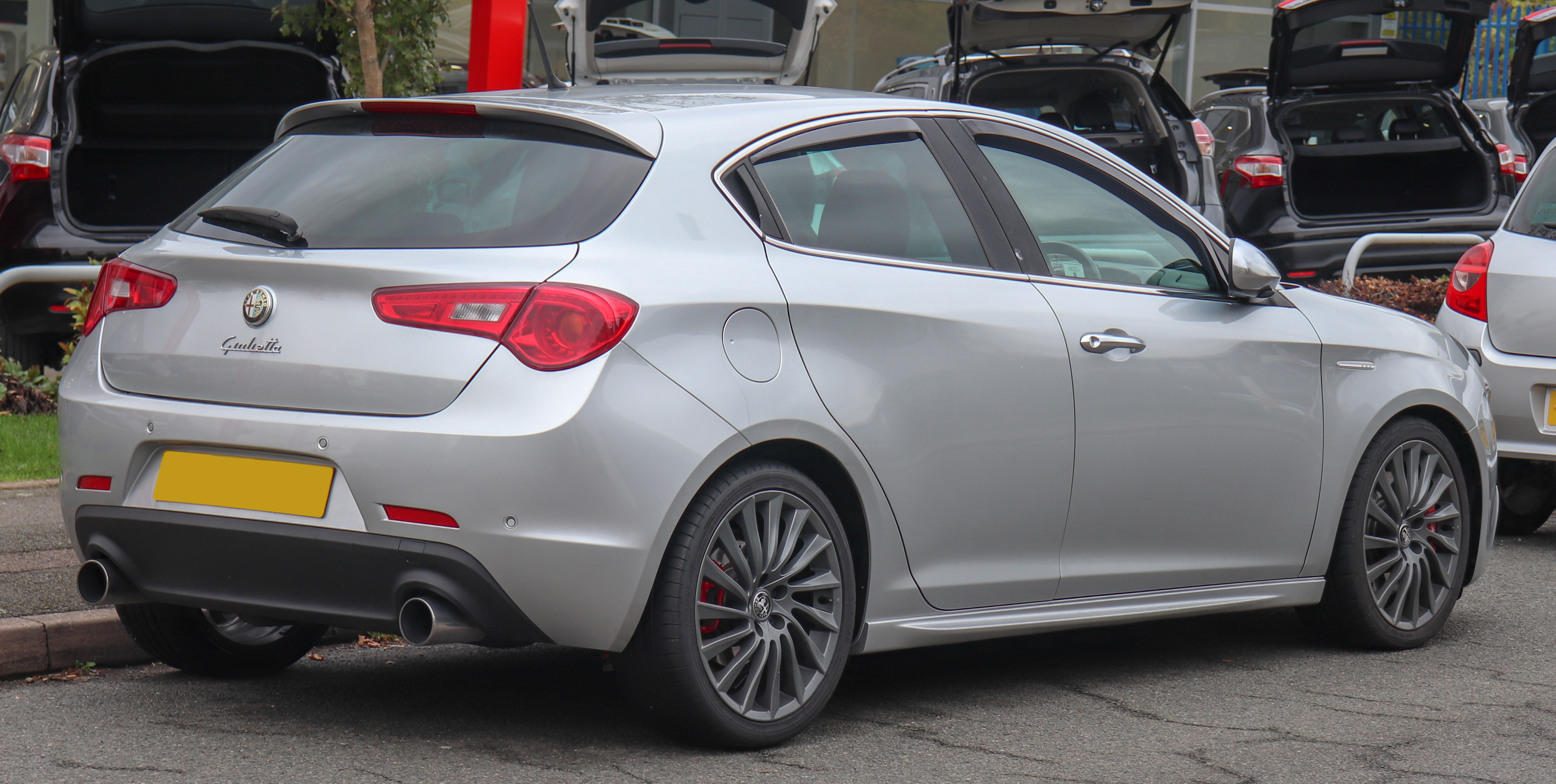
Pre-facelift 2011 Alfa Romeo Giulietta Veloce hatchback (United Kingdom)

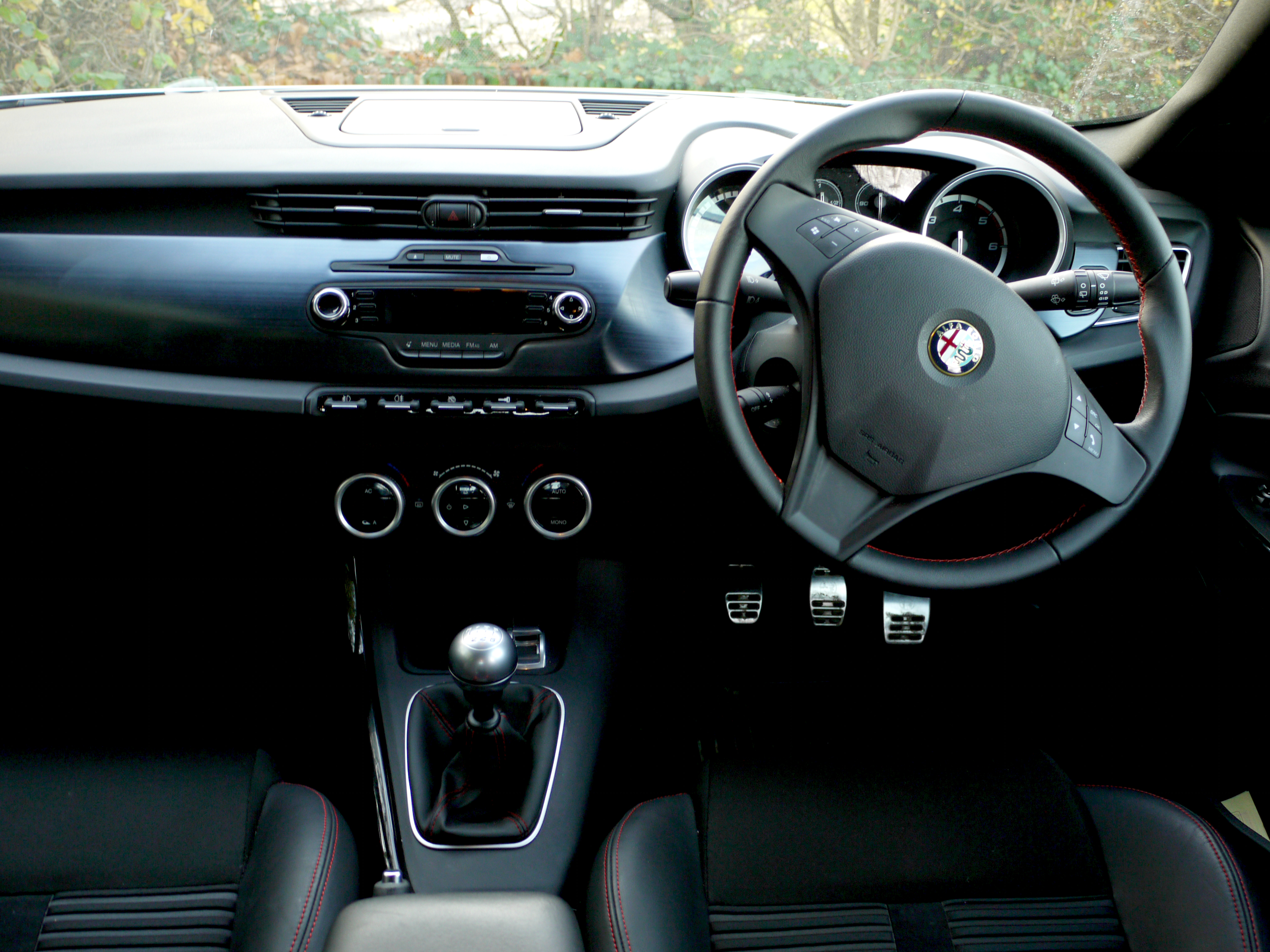
Interior

The platform used in the Giulietta is Fiat Group's Compact, successor of the C-platform (base for Fiat Stilo, Fiat Bravo and Lancia Delta). Practically, this is an all new modular platform; only the central front part comes from the previous C-platform, however that part is also modified. Fiat Group spent around 100 million euros developing it.

- 84% HSS + UHSS: high strength and ultra high strength hot forged steels
- 7% hot-formed steels.
- 3.7% aluminum
- 2.3% xenoy: polymer material with high energy absorption capacity, forms polyethylene terephthalate and polybutylene terephthalate
- 3% low carbon mild steels

In comparison to older Fiat platforms it has a longer wheelbase, shorter overhangs and an advanced new type of MacPherson strut front suspension and multi-link rear suspension. Depending on the market and trim level, 16, 17, or 18-inch wheels were available. Available tire sizes were 205/55 R16, 225/45 R17, and 225/40 R18. The wheels use a 5-hole pattern with a 110 mm bolt circle. The length of the Giulietta is around 4.3 metres (14 ft). Only a five-door body was available.

In a viability plan forwarded to the US Government in February 2009, Chrysler (a partner of Alfa Romeo parent company Fiat) reported that the 147 replacement would come to market as the Milano and that it could be built in the US. However, as of early 2010 Fiat was instead planning to concentrate on bringing larger models to the US, such as the Giulia.

== 2013 facelift ==
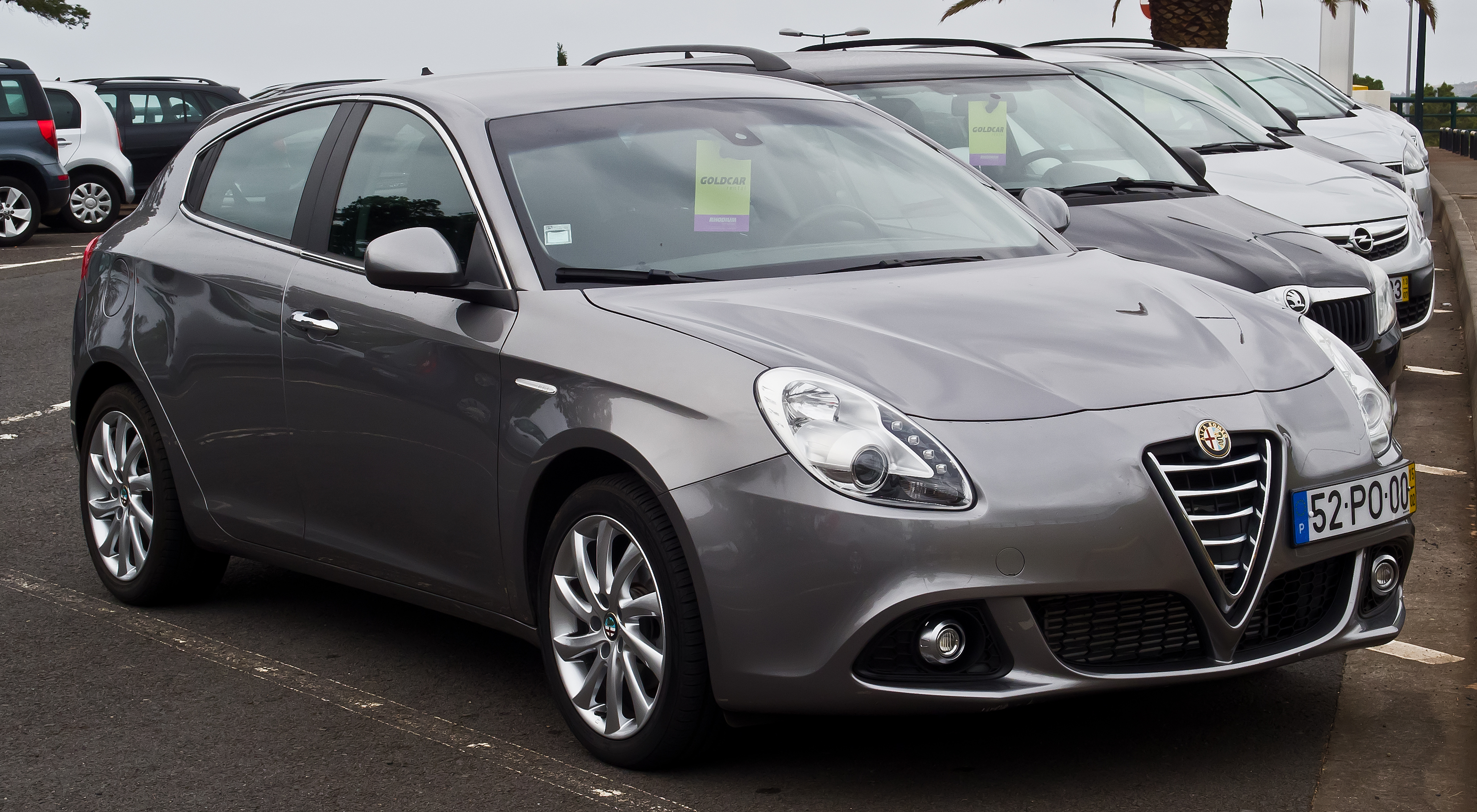
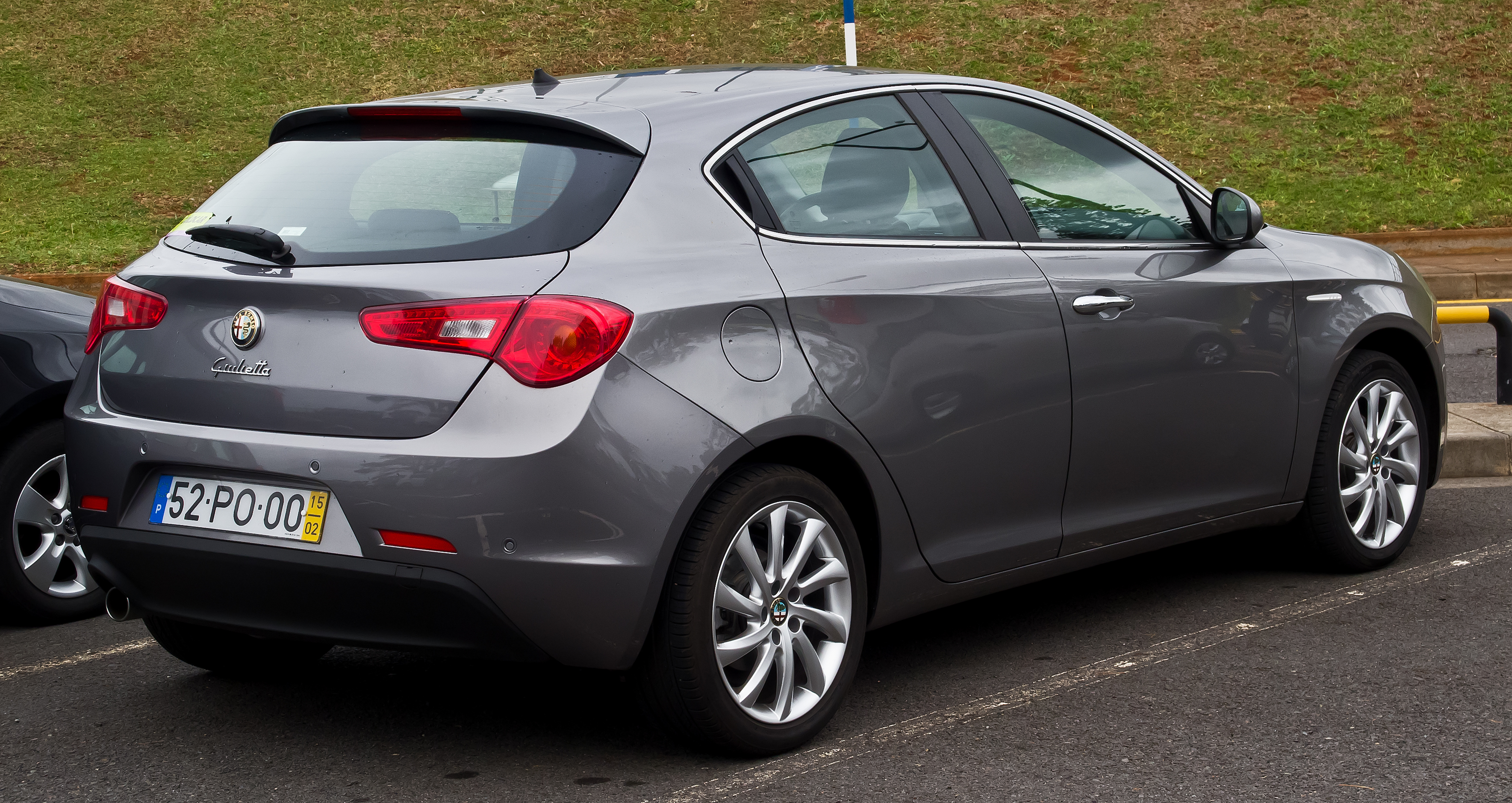
First facelift Alfa Romeo Giulietta (Europe)

At the 2013 Frankfurt International Motor Show Alfa Romeo presented an updated Giulietta. Trim changes included a new Uconnect infotainment system with 5" or 6.5" Radionav touchscreen, a new front grille, a chrome-plated frame for the fog lights, a new and more supportive seat design, new wheel designs (16, 17 and 18-inch), as well as new exterior colours: Moonlight Pearl, Anodizzato Blue and Bronze. A new diesel engine variant also arrived, the 2.0-litre JTDM 2, developing 150 PS (110 kW; 148 hp) and 380 N⋅m (280 lb⋅ft). In the 2014 range, all engines complied with Euro 5+ (Euro 6-ready) emission standards.

== 2016 facelift ==
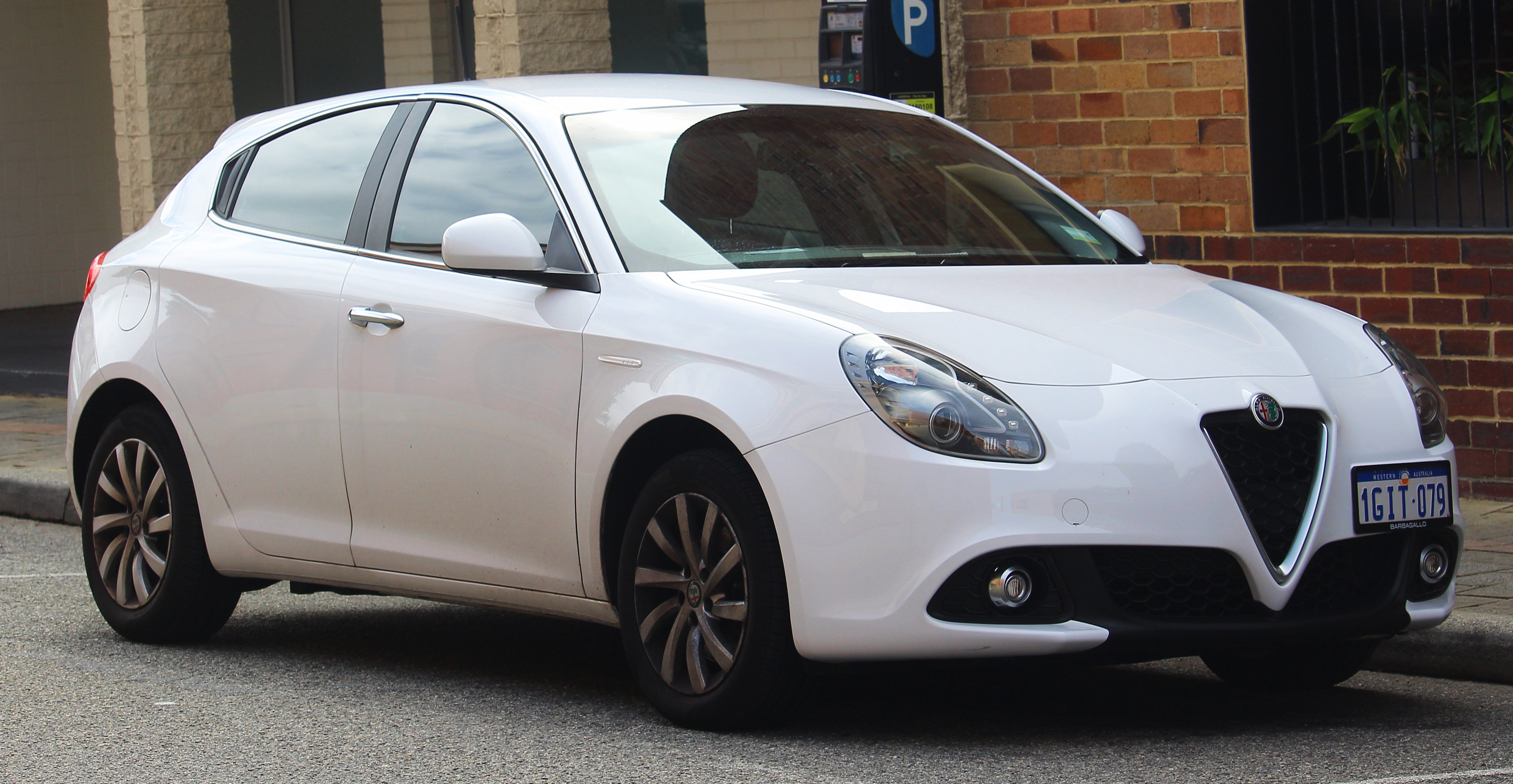
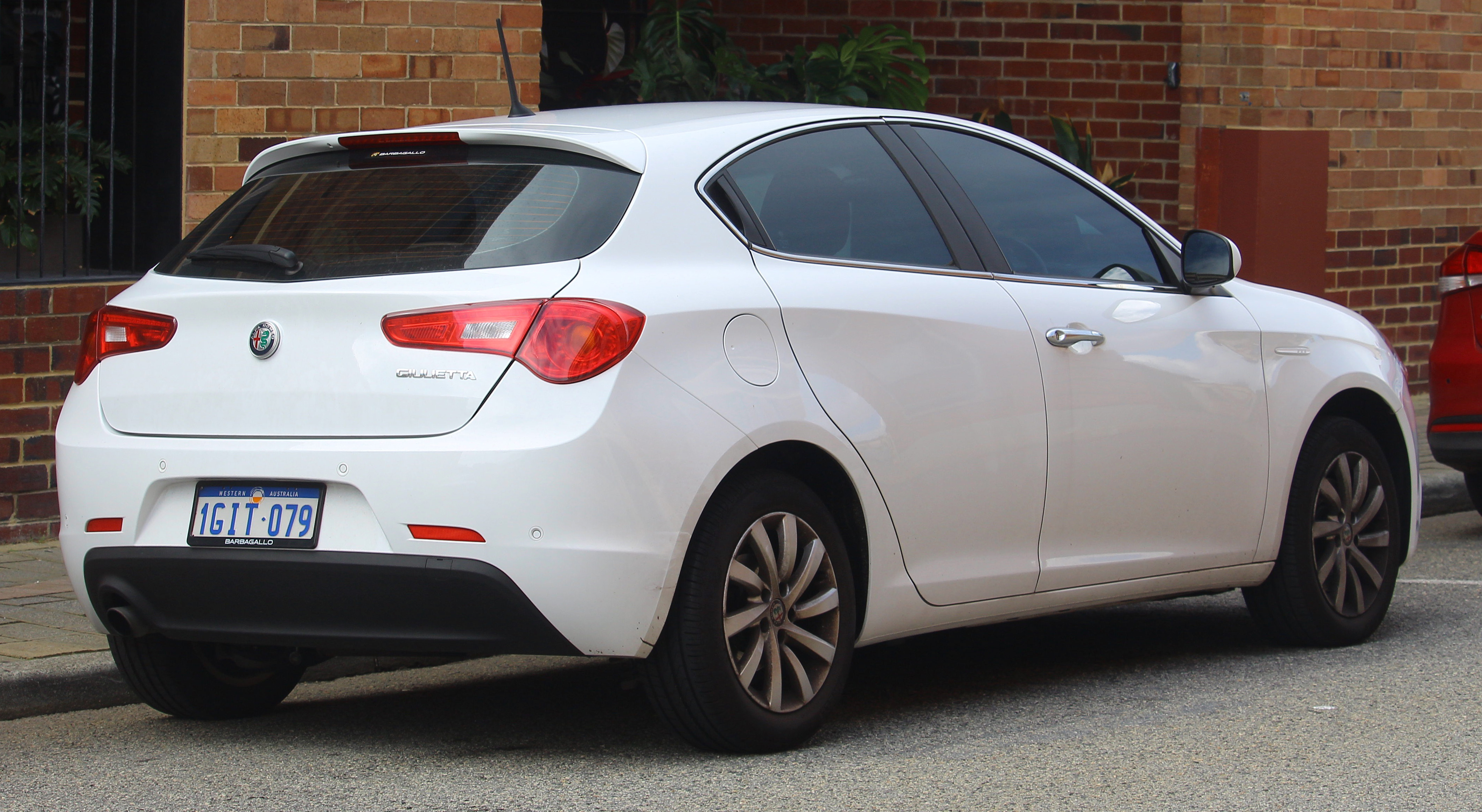
2016 facelift (Australia)

At the 2016 Geneva Motor Show, a new Giulietta revision debuted with facelifted front resembling the new larger Giulia. Also the lettering and logo were updated to the new Alfa Romeo brand design. Trim line up was changed to Giulietta, Giulietta Super and Giulietta Veloce, which replaced the previous Giulietta QV but retained the same engine. Also a new 1.6-litre JTDm 120 PS (88 kW; 118 hp) diesel engine with TCT transmission was introduced, as well as a new exterior colour and wheel designs.

== 2019 changes ==
For 2019 Giulietta has updated engines, all Euro 6 D: a 1.4-litre 120 PS turbo petrol, a 1.6-litre 120 PS Multijet with manual or TCT automatic transmission, and a 2.0-litre 170 PS Multijet with TCT.

== Variants ==
=== Quadrifoglio Verde (2010–2016) ===
The Quadrifoglio Verde is the top of the range model with a 1.74 L (1,742 cc) turbocharged TBi engine rated at 235 PS (173 kW; 232 hp), a lowered ride height (15 mm (0.6 in) at the front and 10 mm (0.4 in) at the rear), 18-inch alloy wheels and 225/40 R18 tires, an enhanced braking system (330 mm (13.0 in) front, 278 mm (10.9 in) rear) with calipers painted Alfa red; dark tinted windows, aluminium pedals, cloverleaf badges, leather and microfibre seats plus sports leather seats as an option; dark brushed aluminium dashboard. 1750 is an engine size which has its roots in Alfa Romeo's history, with 1.75 L engines being used to power some of Alfa Romeo's first cars.

The UK version was originally marketed as the Giulietta Cloverleaf, then Quadrifoglio Verde through '14–'15 before finally being renamed to the Veloce in 2016 until the end of production.

==== 2014 update ====
At the Geneva Motor Show, Alfa Romeo introduced an updated Quadrifoglio Verde which has a new 1,742 cc (1.7 L; 106.3 cu in) turbo gasoline direct injection aluminium-block inline-four engine now upgraded to 240 PS (177 kW; 237 hp) at 5750 rpm and 340 N⋅m (251 lb⋅ft) of torque at 2000 rpm, with Alfa's TCT 6-speed twin dry clutch transmission borrowed from the Alfa Romeo 4C. With the new engine, the Giulietta's flagship can exceed 240 km/h (149 mph) and accelerate from 0 to 100 km/h (62 mph) in 6.0 seconds.

This new facelifted version was premiered with a limited 'Launch Edition', recognizable by the black-finish on the sills all round. It was available in new matt Grigio Magnesio Opaco along with Rosso Alfa and Rosso Competizione. Each car has its own numbered plaque. Around 700 units were made.

Pre-facelift styling

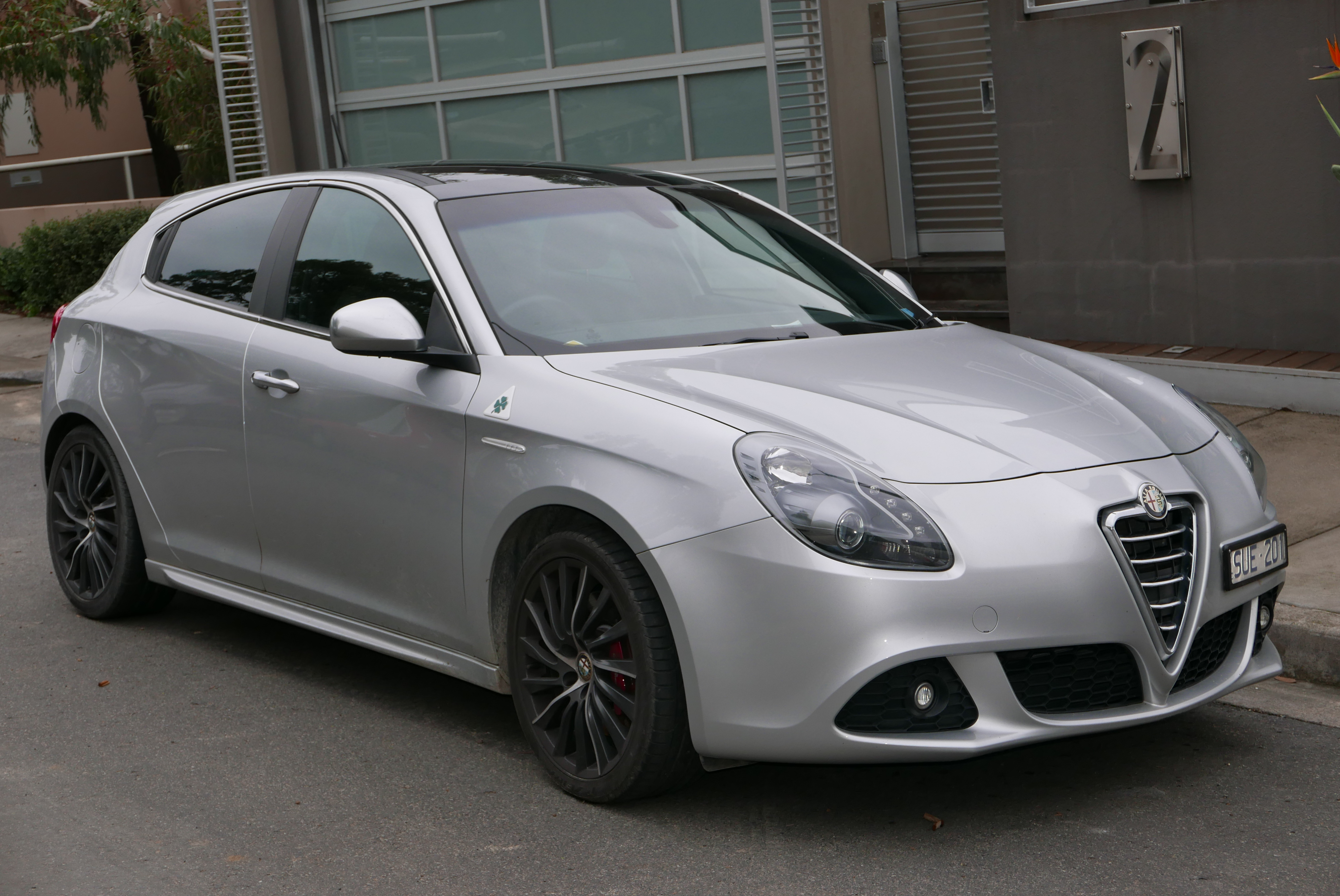
Front

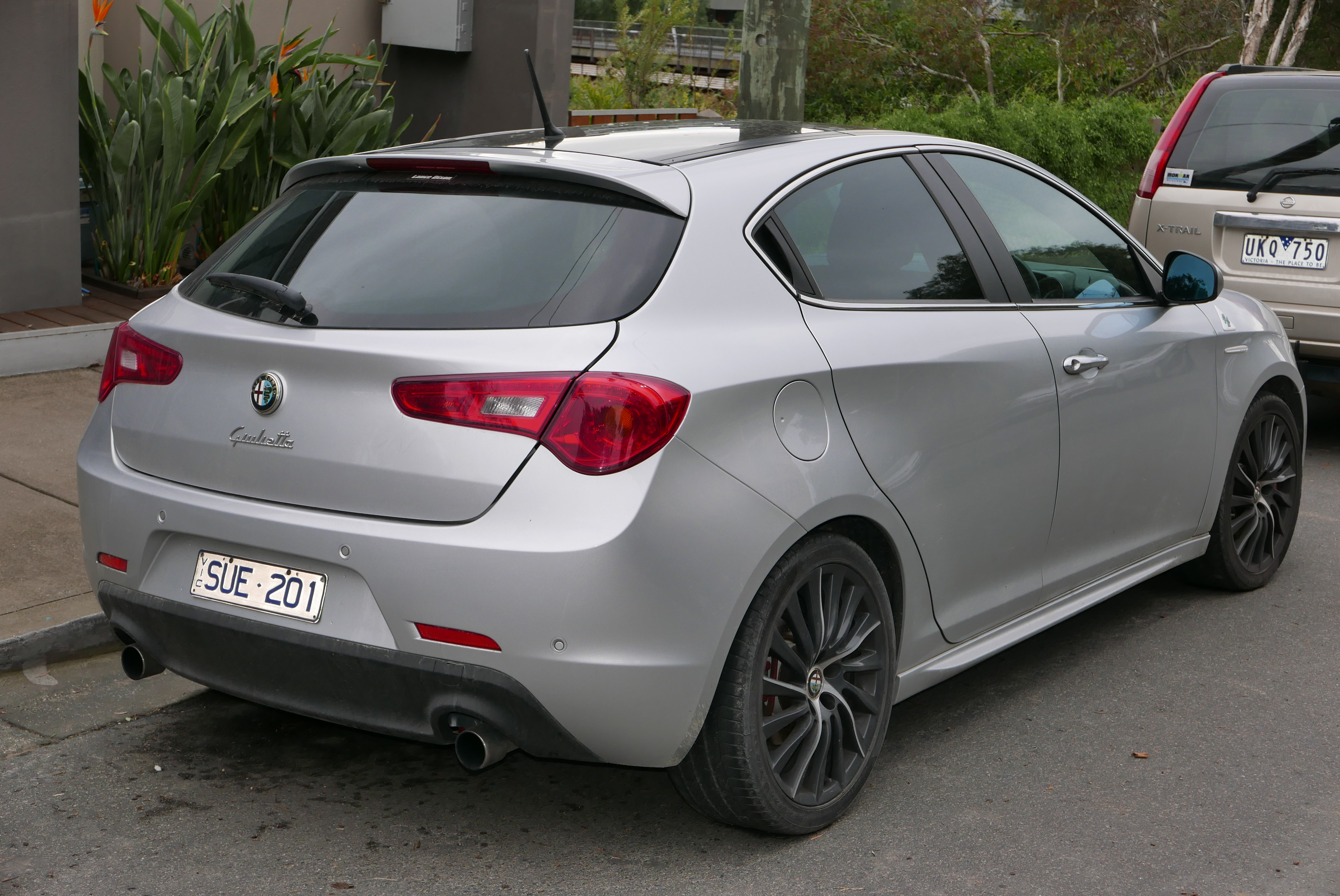
Rear

Post-facelift styling

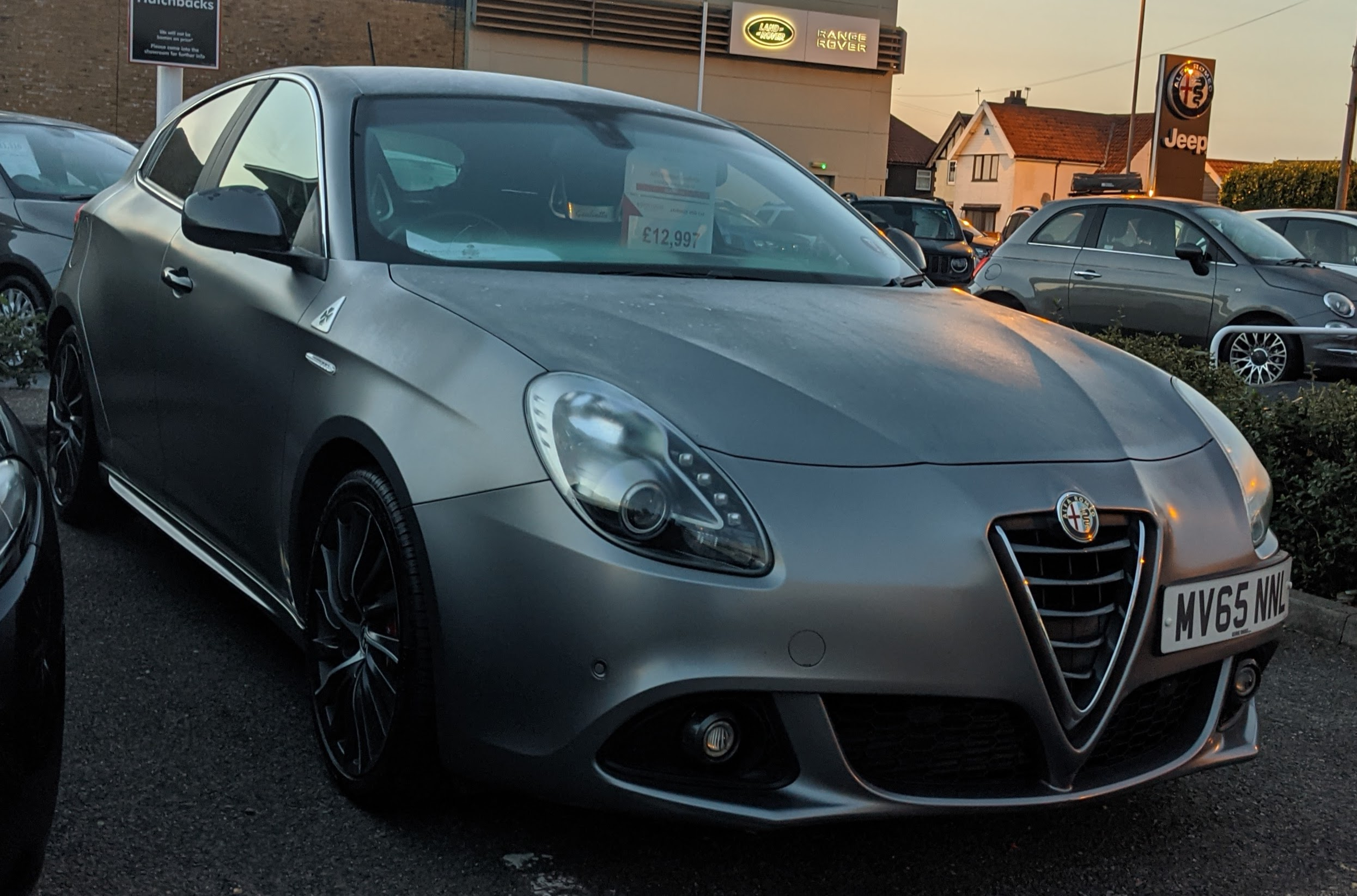
Front

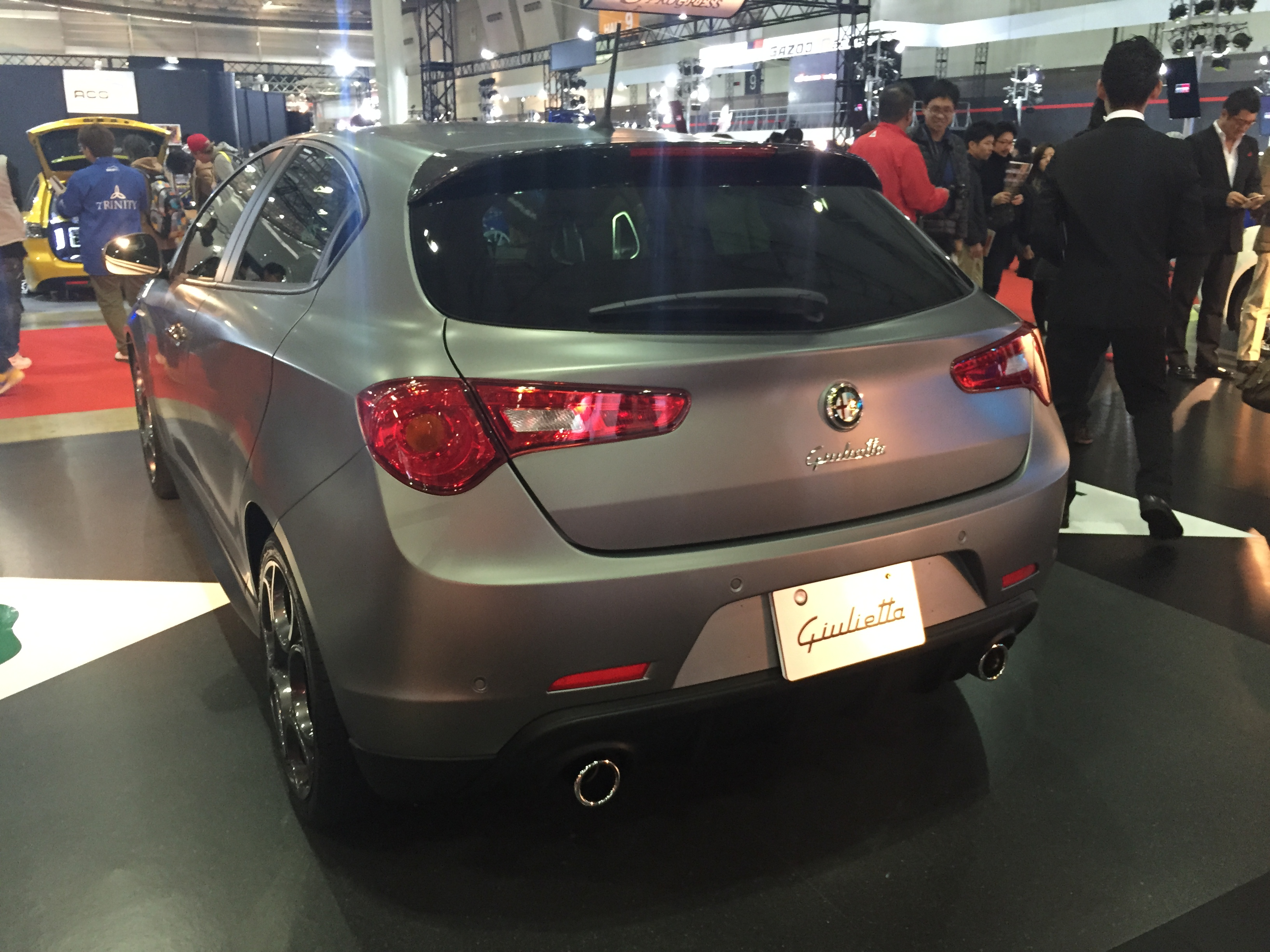
Rear

=== GTS Q2 ===
The GTS Q2 is a version of Hong Kong market version GT Q2 with Sport Package. It includes the engine from 1.4-litre TB MultiAir TCT, with a 6-speed TCT transmission. The Q2 also have front axle limited slip differential system installed.

=== 120 HP 1.4 LPG Turbo (2011–2020) ===
It is a version equipped to run both LPG and petrol fuel types. It includes a Euro 5-compliant 1.4-litre turbo engine rated at 120 PS (88 kW; 118 hp) at 5000 rpm and 206 N⋅m (152 lb⋅ft) at 1750 rpm, three different trim levels (Giulietta, Progression and Distinctive) for all European markets, 38-litre toroid type (ring-shaped) LPG tank at the spare wheel housing, and a 6-speed manual transmission.

The LPG version was unveiled in the 2011 Bologna Motor Show.

=== Sprint 60th Anniversary (2014–2020) ===
At Centro Sperimentale di Balocco in October 2014, Alfa Romeo launched a 60th anniversary edition of the Giulietta. The Giulietta Sprint pays homage to the 1954 Giulietta (Tipo 750/101) which promised good performance at an affordable price. The 2014 Giulietta Sprint features a unique 1.4-litre MultiAir petrol engine rated at 152 PS (112 kW; 150 hp) at 5500 rpm and 250 N⋅m (184 lb⋅ft) at 1750 rpm. Other changes include a carbon fibre effect interior trim, and sportier exterior styling including side skirts, rear diffuser and oversized exhaust.

=== Squadra Corse TCT (2015) ===
The Squadra Corse TCT is a limited-edition version of the Giulietta Quadrifoglio Verde made for the South African market. It comes with the 1750 Turbo Petrol engine modified to produce 286 PS (210 kW; 282 hp), a custom sports exhaust and the Alfa Romeo TCT transmission. Only 100 of the Squadra Corse cars were produced.

== Engines ==
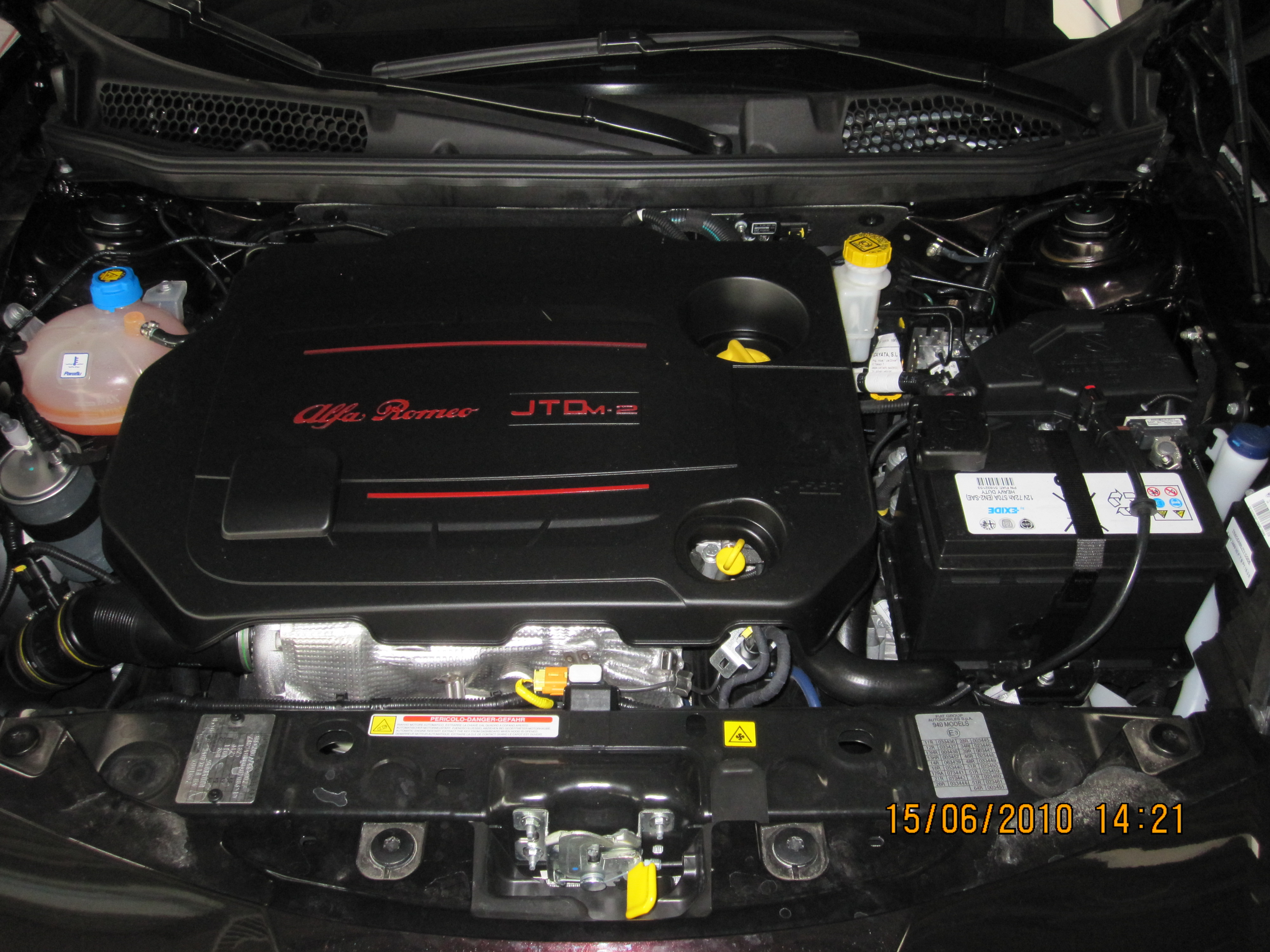
Multijet diesel engine used in Giulietta

The range of engines includes the new 1.4 L T-Jet petrol and M-jet diesel family, all turbocharged. A six-speed manual and Dual Dry Clutch Transmission TCT (Twin Clutch Transmission) introduced at the 2010 Paris International Motor Show, will be choice gearboxes for customers. Fitted to the 1.4 MultiAir petrol and 2.0 MultiJet diesel, this compact six-speed gearbox reduces the fuel consumption and CO_{2} emissions of both engines compared to the manual versions. The diesel drops to 119 g/km, while the petrol is reduced to 121 g/km, giving the latter best-in-class emissions and power output in its class for a petrol engine.

The Alfa Romeo Giulietta uses a new engine which utilizes a system known as Multiair. The system controls the amount of air going into the engine by controlling when air is allowed into the engine and how much the inlet valve opens. The system works by inserting a "tappet" between the cam shaft and the valve and the engine management system can control the amount of oil that is allowed into the "tappet" thus changing the effective opening profile of the inlet valve. The system can also change the overlap of the inlet and exhaust valves as well as changing the amount of lift and this allows the engine to maintain a steady pressure in the inlet manifold which is used to increase the amount of torque the engine produces while maintaining the efficiency of the engine. The system is said to increase torque by 20% while reducing emissions by a similar amount. All engines except the 1750 TBi have a Start&Stop system and all until 2016 are Euro5 rated. From late 2015, all engines in the Giulietta range are Euro 6 compliant and all apart from the 2.0L MultiJet2 Diesel (2014) come with improvements to their CO_{2} emission and fuel economy figures.

The top of the range model has 1.7 L turbocharged engine, the 1750 TBi – 235 PS (173 kW; 232 hp) with an exclusive Quadrifoglio Verde configuration (called Cloverleaf in the UK). At the 2011 Bologna Motor Show an LPG version of the Giulietta was unveiled.

=== Specifications ===
Engine	Type	Code	Displacement	Power	Torque	0–100 km/h (0–62 mph)	Top speed	Years
Petrol engines
1.4 TB	I4	940B1000	1,368 cc (83.5 cu in)	105 PS (77 kW; 104 hp) at 5000 rpm	206 N⋅m (152 lb⋅ft) at 1750 rpm	10.9 s	186 km/h (116 mph)	2011–2020
1.4 TB	I4	198A4000	1,368 cc (83.5 cu in)	120 PS (88 kW; 118 hp) at 5000 rpm	206 N⋅m (152 lb⋅ft) at 1750 rpm	9.4 s	195 km/h (121 mph)	2010–2020
1.4 TB MultiAir	I4	940A2000	1,368 cc (83.5 cu in)	170 PS (125 kW; 168 hp) at 5500 rpm	250 N⋅m (184 lbf⋅ft) at 2500 rpm	7.8 s	218 km/h (135 mph)	2010–2020
1.4 TB MultiAir TCT	I4	940A2000	1,368 cc (83.5 cu in)	170 PS (125 kW; 168 hp) at 5500 rpm	250 N⋅m (184 lbf⋅ft) at 2500 rpm	7.7 s	218 km/h (135 mph)	2011–2020
1.4 TB MultiAir [Euro6]	I4	940C2000	1,368 cc (83.5 cu in)	150 PS (110 kW; 148 hp) at 5500 rpm	250 N⋅m (184 lbf⋅ft) at 2500 rpm	8.2 s	209 km/h (130 mph)	2016–2020
1750 TBi	I4	940A1000	1,742 cc (106.3 cu in)	235 PS (173 kW; 232 hp) at 5500 rpm	340 N⋅m (251 lbf⋅ft) at 1900 rpm	6.8 s	242 km/h (150 mph)	2010–2013
1750 TBi	I4	940B2000	1,742 cc (106.3 cu in)	240 PS (177 kW; 237 hp) at 5750 rpm	340 N⋅m (251 lbf⋅ft) at 2000 rpm	6.0 s	244 km/h (152 mph)	2014–2020
Diesel engines
1.6L MultiJet	I4	940A3000	1,598 cc (97.5 cu in)	105 PS (77 kW; 104 hp) at 4000 rpm	280 N⋅m (207 lbf⋅ft) at 1750 rpm	11.3 s	185 km/h (115 mph)	2010–2020
1.6L MultiJet	I4	940C1000	1,598 cc (97.5 cu in)	120 PS (88 kW; 118 hp) at 3750 rpm	320 N⋅m (236 lbf⋅ft) at 1750 rpm	10.0 s	195 km/h (121 mph)	2015–2020
2.0L MultiJet	I4	940A5000	1,956 cc (119.4 cu in)	140 PS (103 kW; 138 hp) at 3750 rpm	350 N⋅m (258 lbf⋅ft) at 1500 rpm	9.0 s	205 km/h (127 mph)	2010–2020
2.0L MultiJet2	I4	940A5000	1,956 cc (119.4 cu in)	150 PS (110 kW; 148 hp) at 3750 rpm	380 N⋅m (280 lbf⋅ft) at 1750 rpm	8.8 s	210 km/h (130 mph)	2014–2020
2.0L MultiJet	I4	940A4000	1,956 cc (119.4 cu in)	170 PS (125 kW; 168 hp) at 4000 rpm	350 N⋅m (258 lbf⋅ft) at 1750 rpm	8.0 s	218 km/h (135 mph)	2010–2020
2.0L MultiJet TCT	I4	940A4000	1,956 cc (119.4 cu in)	170 PS (125 kW; 168 hp) at 4000 rpm	350 N⋅m (258 lbf⋅ft) at 1750 rpm	7.9 s	218 km/h (135 mph)	2011–2020
2.0L MultiJet TCT	I4	n/a	1,956 cc (119.4 cu in)	175 PS (129 kW; 173 hp) at 4000 rpm	350 N⋅m (258 lbf⋅ft) at 1750 rpm	7.8 s	219 km/h (136 mph)	2014–2020
LPG engine
1.4 LPG Turbo	I4	n/a	1,368 cc (83.5 cu in)	120 PS (88 kW; 118 hp) at 5000 rpm	206 N⋅m (152 lb⋅ft) at 1750 rpm	10.3 s	195 km/h (121 mph)	2011–2020

=== Fuel consumption & CO_{2} emissions ===
Engine	City consumption	Highway consumption	Combined consumption	CO_{2} emissions	Years
1.4 TB (105 PS)	8.4 L/100 km (34 mpg_{‑imp}; 28 mpg_{‑US})	5.3 L/100 km (53 mpg_{‑imp}; 44 mpg_{‑US})	6.4 L/100 km (44 mpg_{‑imp}; 37 mpg_{‑US})	149 g/km	
1.4 TB	8.4 L/100 km (34 mpg_{‑imp}; 28 mpg_{‑US})	5.3 L/100 km (53 mpg_{‑imp}; 44 mpg_{‑US})	6.4 L/100 km (44 mpg_{‑imp}; 37 mpg_{‑US})	149 g/km	
1.4 TB MultiAir	7.9 L/100 km (36 mpg_{‑imp}; 30 mpg_{‑US})	4.7 L/100 km (60 mpg_{‑imp}; 50 mpg_{‑US})	5.9 L/100 km (48 mpg_{‑imp}; 40 mpg_{‑US})	137 g/km	
1.4 TB MultiAir TCT	6.7 L/100 km (42 mpg_{‑imp}; 35 mpg_{‑US})	4.3 L/100 km (66 mpg_{‑imp}; 55 mpg_{‑US})	5.2 L/100 km (54 mpg_{‑imp}; 45 mpg_{‑US})	121 g/km	
1750 TBi	10.8 L/100 km (26 mpg_{‑imp}; 22 mpg_{‑US})	5.8 L/100 km (49 mpg_{‑imp}; 41 mpg_{‑US})	7.6 L/100 km (37 mpg_{‑imp}; 31 mpg_{‑US})	177 g/km	
1750 TBi	9.5 L/100 km (30 mpg_{‑imp}; 25 mpg_{‑US})	5.2 L/100 km (54 mpg_{‑imp}; 45 mpg_{‑US})	6.8 L/100 km (42 mpg_{‑imp}; 35 mpg_{‑US})	162 g/km	2014–2020
1.6L MultiJet	5.5 L/100 km (51 mpg_{‑imp}; 43 mpg_{‑US})	3.7 L/100 km (76 mpg_{‑imp}; 64 mpg_{‑US})	4.4 L/100 km (64 mpg_{‑imp}; 53 mpg_{‑US})	114 g/km	
1.6L MultiJet (120 PS)	4.9 L/100 km (58 mpg_{‑imp}; 48 mpg_{‑US})	3.3 L/100 km (86 mpg_{‑imp}; 71 mpg_{‑US})	3.9 L/100 km (72 mpg_{‑imp}; 60 mpg_{‑US})	103 g/km	
2.0L MultiJet (140 PS)	5.6 L/100 km (50 mpg_{‑imp}; 42 mpg_{‑US})	3.9 L/100 km (72 mpg_{‑imp}; 60 mpg_{‑US})	4.5 L/100 km (63 mpg_{‑imp}; 52 mpg_{‑US})	119 g/km	
2.0L MultiJet (170 PS)	5.8 L/100 km (49 mpg_{‑imp}; 41 mpg_{‑US})	4.1 L/100 km (69 mpg_{‑imp}; 57 mpg_{‑US})	4.7 L/100 km (60 mpg_{‑imp}; 50 mpg_{‑US})	124 g/km	
2.0L MultiJet TCT (170 PS)	5.3 L/100 km (53 mpg_{‑imp}; 44 mpg_{‑US})	4.0 L/100 km (71 mpg_{‑imp}; 59 mpg_{‑US})	4.5 L/100 km (63 mpg_{‑imp}; 52 mpg_{‑US})	119 g/km	
Note: Consumption figures according to European Commission Directive 1999/100/EC.

== Safety and driving aids ==
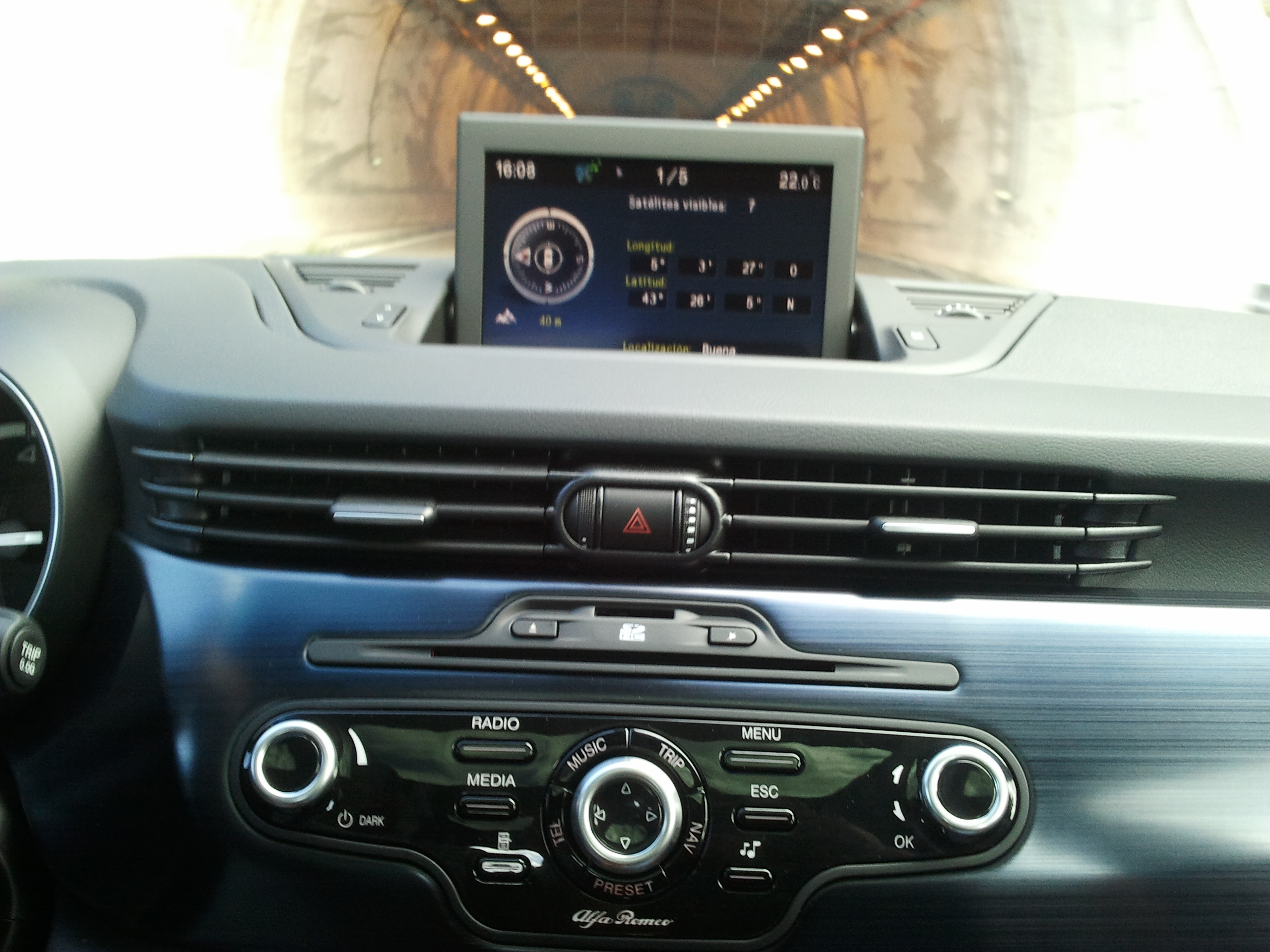
Radionav (entertainment, navigation and communication system) in a Giulietta.

The Giulietta was designed with a target of a 5-star Euro NCAP safety rating. The car also has many electronic devices as standard: VDC (Vehicle Dynamic Control) electronic stability control, DST (Dynamic Steering Torque), Q2 electronic differential and Alfa Romeo DNA selector which allows driver to choose between three different driving settings; Dynamic, Normal and All-Weather, this setting controls the behaviour of engine, brakes, steering, suspension and gearbox.

The Alfa Romeo Giulietta is equipped with a reactive head restraint and gained five star rating and overall score of 87/100 in the Euro NCAP car safety tests. That result made it the safest compact car ever tested by Euro NCAP by then. Giulietta's result (97% Adult Occupant, 85% Child Occupant, 63% Pedestrian Protection and 86% Safety Assist) means that the car will also have five-star rating in 2012 when the Euro NCAP system will have reached maximum severity. The Giulietta was named as best performing Small Family category car in 2010 by Euro NCAP.

ANCAP test results* Alfa Romeo Guilietta (2011)
Test	Score
Overall	5 /5 stars
Frontal offset	15.44/16
Side impact	16/16
Pole	2/2
Seat belt reminders	3/3
Whiplash protection	Good
Pedestrian protection	Adequate
Electronic stability control	Standard

Euro NCAP test results* Alfa Romeo Giulietta (2011)
Test	Points	%
Overall:	5 /5 stars	
Adult occupant:	35	97%
Child occupant:	42	85%
Pedestrian:	23	63%
Safety assist:	6	86%

In 2017, the Giulietta was re-tested using the 2017 Euro NCAP test procedures.

Euro NCAP test results* Alfa Romeo Giulietta (2017)
Test	Points	%
Overall:	3 /5 stars	
Adult occupant:	27.6	72%
Child occupant:	27.5	56%
Pedestrian:	25	59%
Safety assist:	3	25%

== Sales ==
Year	European sales	Mexican sales	Australian sales
2010	34,168	0	14
2011	78,911	6	526
2012	60,665	40	610
2013	45,920	69	1949
2014	40,941	29	2268
2015	41,767	116	1272
2016	41,528	198	639
2017	32,700	180	389
2018	26,632	104	297
2019	15,690	82	169
2020	10,817	58	120

== Marketing, sponsorship and motorsport ==
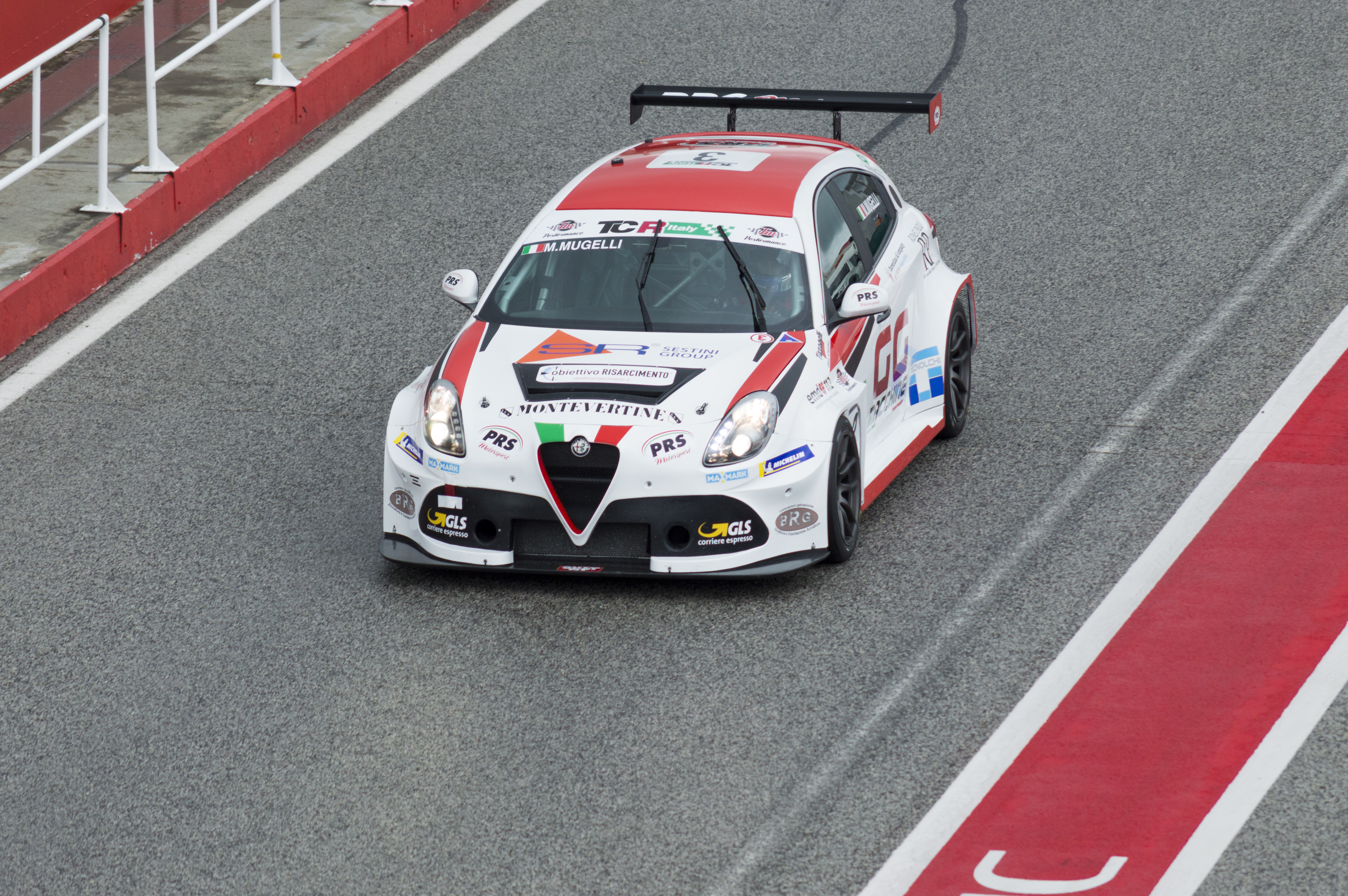
Massimiliano Mugelli at TCR Italy 2019 in Misano.

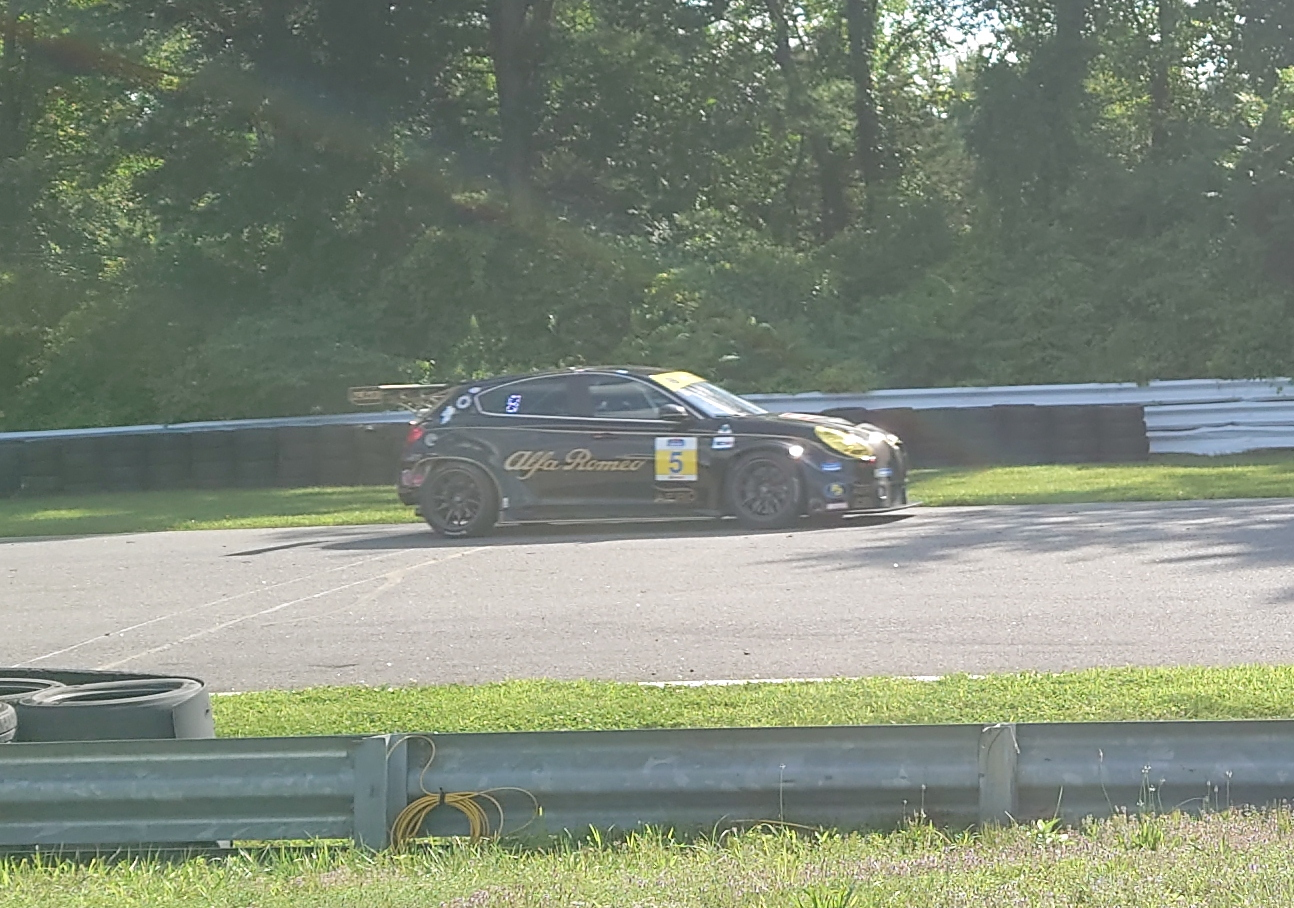
KMW Motorsports' Giulietta at the 2023 running of the Lime Rock Park 120

Alfa Romeo Giulietta Quadrifoglio Verde is used as Superbike World Championship safety car (except in the United States rounds, where because of Fiat marketing, the Dodge Challenger SRT and some Ram Trucks are used since the Giulietta brand is not sold in the United States, but the Ram and SRT brands are.). A fleet of Giuliettas was used also in Eco Targa Florio organisation.

The Giulietta was used as a hero car in the 2013 film Fast & Furious 6. To promote the film, Alfa Romeo published a series of photos featuring Giuliettas that were destroyed during the film's production. In addition, six Giuliettas were offered with a dashboard plaque signed by cast members of the film, as well as the option to attend a stunt day with a stunt coordinator.

The Handy Motorsports BTCC Giulietta

A NGTC-spec Giulietta entered the 2018 British Touring Car Championship by Handy Motorsport, achieving a race win.

The Romeo Ferraris TCR Giulietta QV

In 2015, the Italian tuning garage Romeo Ferraris started to work, without the marques help, in the Alfa Romeo Giulietta to race in TCR International Series, appearing under the banner of Mulsanne Racing, with Michela Cerruti for the first two races of the 2016 season. They returned in the 5th round in Salzburgring with second car for Petř Fulín and a new colour scheme, staying in the championship until the end of the year with two cars. For 2016 season, the engine was tuned for 330 PS (243 kW; 325 hp).

In 2017, Davit Kajaia and Dusan Borković joined forces with Romeo Ferraris and raced the full TCR-season as GE-Force, taking three victories in Georgia, Bahrain and Salzburgring.

In 2018, mostly because WTCC and TCR Internacional became one, the team Mulsanne Racing entered the World Touring Car Cup (WTCR) with two Alfa Romeo Giulietta QV for the two Alfa Romeo legends Gianni Morbidelli, which raced until Vila Real being replaced by Kevin Ceccon (who scored a race win in Suzuka), and Fabrizio Giovanardi, who was replaced in the Suzuka round by Luigi "Gigi" Ferrara (2nd overall in TCR Italy 2018). For 2018 season, the car produced over 350 PS (257 kW; 345 hp).

For the 2019 season, the car received a major aerodynamic upgrade being renamed as "Alfa Romeo Giulietta Veloce". Team Mulsanne maintained Ceccon and hired Ma Qing Hua (ex-Formula E and WTCC driver). Alongside the World Cup cars, Romeo Ferraris will have about 8–10 Giuliettas racing in TCR Italy, UK, US, Australia and China.

In 2020 the Team Mulsanne car driven by Jean-Karl Vernay entered into the World Touring Car Cup finished 3rd in the Championship overall and won the WTCR Trophy as the highest car without factory support.

In January 2022, it won the TCR category of the Michelin Pilot Challenge race at Daytona International Speedway. KMW Motorsports would continue to field the Giulietta in the series until 2025, the year in which its homologation expired.

== Awards ==
The Giulietta came as second in European Car of the Year 2011. The Multiair engines used in Giulietta was voted for the best new engine in 2010. The car has also collected the following awards:

- Auto Europa 2011
- Auto Trophy 2010 (Design Trophy – Compact Category) – Auto Zeitung
- Compact Car of the Year Trophée L'Argus
- Greek Car of the Year 2011
- Czech Republic Car of the Year 2011
- Die besten Autos 2010 – Import compact cars category – Auto, Motor und Sport
- Die besten Autos 2011 – Import compact cars category – Auto, Motor und Sport
- 2019 Auto Bild magazine win of "Design" category "Best Brands" competition.
