= Terence Tse (racing driver) =

Hong Kong racing driver

Tse Terence Kin Leung 謝健良
- Nationality: Hong Konger
- Born: Hong Kong

TCR International Series career
- Debut season: 2016
- Current team: Roadstar Racing
- Car number: 17
- Starts: 0

Previous series
- 2016 2015-16 2015: TCR Asia Series; Clio Cup China Series; Asian Formula Renault Series

"Terence" Tse Kin Leung (Chinese: 謝健良) is a Hong Kong racing driver currently competing in the TCR International Series and TCR Asia Series. Having previously competed in the Asian Formula Renault Series and Clio Cup China Series amongst others.

== Racing career ==
Tse began his career in 2015 in the Clio Cup China Series, he also raced in the Asian Formula Renault Series at the same time. He finished seventh in both series'. He continued in the Clio Cup China Series for 2016, finishing fourth in the standings. He switched to the TCR Asia Series for 2016, joining the series with Roadstar Racing.

In November 2016, it was announced that Tse would race in the TCR International Series, driving a SEAT León Cup Racer for Roadstar Racing. However he failed to qualify for the races.

== Business career ==
Tse is the owner/operator of Chit Fai Motors Group Limited, which provides minibus services connecting Whampoa, Hung Hom, Hong Kong. After the opening of the MTR Kwun Tong Line extension, his four minibus routes suffered HK$2 million loss, in the end he had to cease providing these services.

== Racing record ==
=== Complete TCR International Series results ===
(key) (Races in bold indicate pole position) (Races in italics indicate fastest lap)

Year	Team	Car	1	2	3	4	5	6	7	8	9	10	11	12	13	14	15	16	17	18	19	20	21	22	DC	Points
2016	Roadstar Racing	SEAT León Cup Racer	BHR; 1	BHR; 2	POR; 1	POR; 2	BEL; 1	BEL; 2	ITA; 1	ITA; 2	AUT; 1	AUT; 2	GER; 1	GER; 2	RUS; 1	RUS; 2	THA; 1	THA; 2	SIN; 1	SIN; 2	MYS; 1	MYS; 2	MAC; 1 DNQ	MAC; 2 DNQ	NC	0

^{†} Driver did not finish the race, but was classified as he completed over 90% of the race distance.
