= 2023 Macau Guia Race =

Car race in Macau, China

Race details
Date	16–19 November 2023
Official name	Macau Guia Race
Location	Circuito da Guia, Macau Peninsula, Macau
Course	Temporary street circuit 6.12 km (3.80 mi)
- Supporting
Distance	Race 1; 9 laps, 55.08 km (34.23 mi); Race 2; 9 laps, 55.08 km (34.23 mi)
- Race 1

Pole
- Driver
- Time

Fastest lap
- Driver
- Time

Podium
First	(Hungary) Norbert Michelisz	(Italy) BRC Hyundai N Squadra Corse
Second	(Argentina) Néstor Girolami	(Macau) MacPro Racing
Third	(United Kingdom) Robert Huff	(Belgium) Audi Sport Team Comtoyou
- Race 2

Fastest lap
- Driver
- Time

Podium
First	(Belgium) Frédéric Vervisch	(Belgium) Audi Sport Team Comtoyou
Second	(Uruguay) Santiago Urrutia	(Sweden) Cyan Racing Lynk & Co
Third	(France) Yann Ehrlacher	(Sweden) Cyan Racing Lynk & Co

The 2023 Macau Guia Race - Kumho TCR World Tour Event of Macau was sixty-first edition of the Macau Guia Race and the eighth edition under the TCR Regulations held at Guia Circuit in Macau on 16–19 November 2023. The race was contested with TCR touring cars and run in support of the 2023 edition of the Macau Grand Prix.

It was part of the TCR World Tour, as the final round, with the top 8 TCR Asia Challenge drivers calculated by points be part of the race.

== Teams and drivers ==
The following teams and drivers are entered into the event:

Entrant	Car	No.	Driver
(Hong Kong) Evolve Racing	Hyundai Elantra N TCR	1	(Hong Kong) Lo Sze Ho
(China) Z.Speed	Hyundai i30 N TCR	6	(China) Li Wengji
(China) QMA Motorsports	Audi RS 3 LMS TCR (2017)	15	(China) Tian Kai
(Italy) BRC Hyundai N Squadra Corse	Hyundai Elantra N TCR	18	(Italy) Marco Butti
(China) Teamwork Motorsport	Audi RS 3 LMS TCR (2021)	21	(Hong Kong) Paul Poon
(China) Fancy Teamwork	Lynk & Co 03 TCR	22	(China) Yan Chuang
(Belgium) Audi Sport Team Comtoyou	Audi RS 3 LMS TCR (2021)	27	(France) John Filippi
(China) 109 Racing	Honda Civic Type R TCR (FK8)	33	(China) Deng Bao Wei
(France) Team Clairet Sport – Hangcha Racing	Peugeot 308 TCR	71	(Australia) Ben Bargwanna
(Italy) BRC Hyundai N Squadra Corse	Hyundai Elantra N TCR	105	(Hungary) Norbert Michelisz
(Sweden) Cyan Racing Lynk & Co	Lynk & Co 03 FL TCR	111	(Sweden) Thed Björk
(Sweden) Cyan Racing Lynk & Co	Lynk & Co 03 FL TCR	112	(Uruguay) Santiago Urrutia
(Belgium) Audi Sport Team Comtoyou	Audi RS 3 LMS TCR (2021)	122	(Belgium) Frédéric Vervisch
(Macau) MacPro Racing	Honda Civic Type R TCR (FL5)	129	(Argentina) Néstor Girolami
(Sweden) Cyan Racing Lynk & Co	Lynk & Co 03 FL TCR	155	(China) Ma Qing Hua
(Sweden) Cyan Racing Lynk & Co	Lynk & Co 03 FL TCR	168	(France) Yann Ehrlacher
(Belgium) Audi Sport Team Comtoyou	Audi RS 3 LMS TCR (2021)	179	(United Kingdom) Robert Huff
(Italy) BRC Hyundai N Squadra Corse	Hyundai Elantra N TCR	196	(Spain) Mikel Azcona

== Results ==
=== Qualifying ===
Pos.	No.	Name	Team	Car	Qualifying times		Final grid
Pos.	No.	Name	Team	Car	Q1	Q2	Final grid
1	105	(Hungary) Norbert Michelisz	BRC Hyundai N Squadra Corse	Hyundai Elantra N TCR	2:28.753	2:27.966	1
2	196	(Spain) Mikel Azcona	BRC Hyundai N Squadra Corse	Hyundai Elantra N TCR	2:28.708	2:28.038	2
3	168	(France) Yann Ehrlacher	Cyan Racing Lynk & Co	Lynk & Co 03 FL TCR	2:29.279	2:28.296	3
4	129	(Argentina) Néstor Girolami	MacPro Racing	Honda Civic Type R TCR (FL5)	2:29.869	2:28.712	4
5	179	(United Kingdom) Robert Huff	Audi Sport Team Comtoyou	Audi RS 3 LMS TCR (2021)	2:29.183	2:28.873	5
6	155	(China) Ma Qing Hua	Cyan Racing Lynk & Co	Lynk & Co 03 FL TCR	2:29.082	2:29.407	6
7	122	(Belgium) Frédéric Vervisch	Audi Sport Team Comtoyou	Audi RS 3 LMS TCR (2021)	2:29.309	2:29.675	7
8	27	(France) John Filippi	Audi Sport Team Comtoyou	Audi RS 3 LMS TCR (2021)	2:30.799	2:30.088	8
9	111	(Sweden) Thed Björk	Cyan Racing Lynk & Co	Lynk & Co 03 FL TCR	2:30.163	2:30.185	9
10	112	(Uruguay) Santiago Urrutia	Cyan Racing Lynk & Co	Lynk & Co 03 FL TCR	2:30.554	2:30.636	10
11	71	(Australia) Ben Bargwanna	Team Clairet Sport – Hangcha Racing	Peugeot 308 TCR	2:30.805	2:32.330	11
12	18	(Italy) Marco Butti	BRC Hyundai N Squadra Corse	Hyundai Elantra N TCR	2:31.406	No time	12
13	1	(Hong Kong) Lo Sze Ho	Evolve Racing	Hyundai Elantra N TCR	2:31.551		13
14	22	(China) Yan Chuang	Fancy Teamwork	Lynk & Co 03 TCR	2:35.228		14
15	21	(Hong Kong) Paul Poon	Teamwork Motorsport	Audi RS 3 LMS TCR (2021)	2:36.481		15
107% time: 2:39.117
16	15	(China) Tian Kai	QMA Motorsports	Audi RS 3 LMS TCR (2017)	2:40.567		16
17	33	(China) Deng Bao Wei	109 Racing	Honda Civic Type R TCR (FK7)	2:41.705		17
—	6	(China) Li Wengji	Z.Speed	Hyundai i30 N TCR	2:48.625		DNQ

=== Race 1 ===
Pos.	No.	Name	Team	Car	Laps	Time/Retired	Grid	Points

=== Race 2 ===
Pos.	No.	Name	Team	Car	Laps	Time/Retired	Grid	Points

== See also ==
- 2023 Macau Grand Prix
- 2023 FIA GT World Cup
