= 2024 Macau Guia Race =

Car race in Macau, China

Date	14–17 November 2024
Official name	Macau Guia Race
Location	Circuito da Guia, Macau Peninsula, Macau
Course	Temporary street circuit 6.12 km (3.80 mi)
Supporting	2024 Macau Grand Prix
Distance	Race 1; 11 laps, 67.32 km (41.83 mi); Race 2; 12 laps, 73.44 km (45.63 mi)
- Race 1

Pole
Driver	(Sweden) Thed Björk	(Sweden) Lynk & Co Cyan Racing
Time	2:29.816

Fastest lap
Driver	(Spain) Mikel Azcona	(Italy) BRC Hyundai N Squadra Corse
Time	2:31.590 on lap 7

Podium
First	(Sweden) Thed Björk	(Sweden) Lynk & Co Cyan Racing
Second	(Hungary) Norbert Michelisz	(Italy) BRC Hyundai N Squadra Corse
Third	(Spain) Mikel Azcona	(Italy) BRC Hyundai N Squadra Corse
- Race 2

Fastest lap
Driver	(Serbia) Dušan Borković	(Spain) GOAT Racing
Time	2:44.801 on lap 12

Podium
First	(Serbia) Dušan Borković	(Spain) GOAT Racing
Second	(Argentina) Esteban Guerrieri	(Spain) GOAT Racing
Third	(Argentina) Esteban Guerrieri	(Spain) GOAT Racing

The 2024 Macau Guia Race - Kumho FIA TCR World Tour Event of Macau was sixty-second edition of the Macau Guia Race and the ninth edition under the TCR regulations held at Guia Circuit in Macau on 14–17 November 2024. The race was contested with TCR touring cars and run in support of the 2024 edition of the Macau Grand Prix. It was part of the TCR World Tour and TCR China Touring Car Championship, as the final round for both series.

Race one was won by Thed Björk, who started from pole position, with Norbert Michelisz and Mikel Azcona joining him on the podium. Dušan Borković won race two ahead of Esteban Guerrieri and Marco Butti, making it a full sweep of the podium for their team GOAT Racing.

== Teams and drivers ==
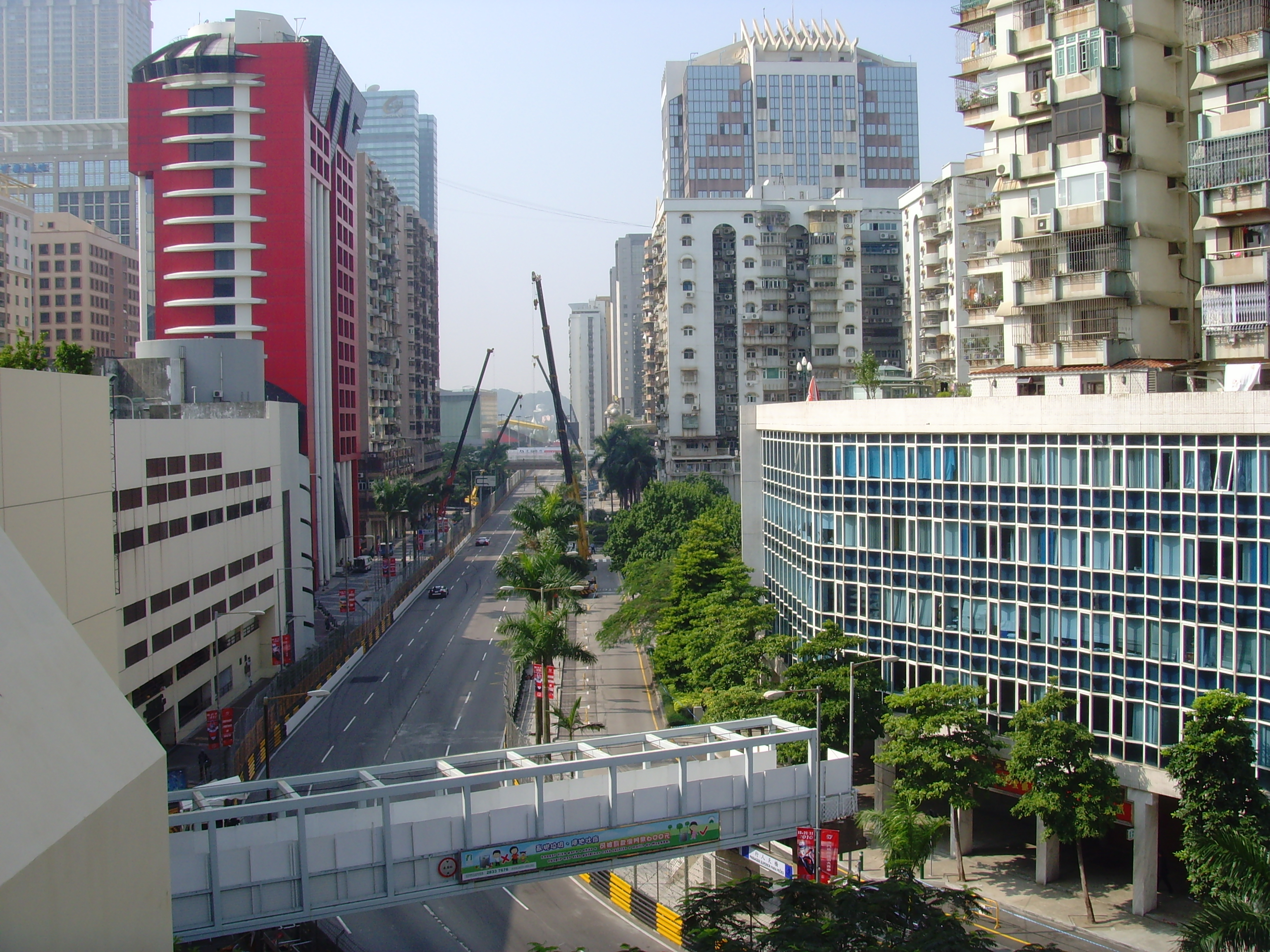
The Guia Circuit, where the race was held.

The following teams and drivers were entered into the event:

Entrant	Car	No.	Driver
(South Korea) Hyundai N Team	Hyundai Elantra N TCR	1	(China) Martin Cao
(South Korea) Hyundai N Team	Hyundai Elantra N TCR	2	(China) Rainey He
(South Korea) Hyundai N Team	Hyundai Elantra N TCR	3	(Hong Kong) Andy Yan
(China) Lynk & Co Teamwork Motorsport	Lynk & Co 03 TCR	9	(China) David Zhu
(China) Lynk & Co Teamwork Motorsport	Lynk & Co 03 TCR	12	(Hong Kong) Sunny Wong
(China) Lynk & Co Teamwork Motorsport	Lynk & Co 03 TCR	36	(China) Jason Zhang
(China) Lynk & Co Teamwork Motorsport	Lynk & Co 03 TCR	72	(China) Juan Carlos Zhu
(Macau) Dongfeng Honda MacPro Racing Team	Honda Civic Type R TCR (FL5)	11	(Canada) Gary Kwok
(Macau) Dongfeng Honda MacPro Racing Team	Honda Civic Type R TCR (FL5)	55	(China) Martin Xie
(China) Hyundai N Team Z.Speed	Hyundai Elantra N TCR	14	(South Korea) Hwang Do-yun
(China) Hyundai N Team Z.Speed	Hyundai Elantra N TCR	18	(China) Zhang Zhendong
(China) Hyundai N Team Z.Speed	Hyundai Elantra N TCR	56	(Indonesia) Benny Santoso
(China) Hyundai N Team Z.Speed	Hyundai Elantra N TCR	69	(Republic of Ireland) Max Hart
(Hong Kong) Team Evolve Racing	Hyundai Elantra N TCR	28	(Hong Kong) Lo Sze Ho
(Hong Kong) Team Evolve Racing	Honda Civic Type R TCR (FK8)	87	(Hong Kong) Man Siu Ming
(China) Audi Sport 326 Racing Team	Audi RS 3 LMS TCR (2021)	51	(China) Wu Yifan
(China) Audi Sport 326 Racing Team	Audi RS 3 LMS TCR (2021)	52	(China) Jamie Lai
(Spain) GOAT Racing	Honda Civic Type R TCR (FL5)	62	(Serbia) Dušan Borković
(Spain) GOAT Racing	Honda Civic Type R TCR (FL5)	186	(Argentina) Esteban Guerrieri
(Spain) GOAT Racing	Honda Civic Type R TCR (FL5)	199	(Italy) Marco Butti
(China) Jun Qian Motorsport with 326 Racing Team	Lynk & Co 03 TCR	66	(Hong Kong) Li Guang Hua
(Indonesia) Delta Garage Racing Team	Hyundai Elantra N TCR	82	(Indonesia) Dypo Fitramadhan
(China) Jinyutu GYT Racing	Audi RS 3 LMS TCR (2021)	95	(China) Hu Heng
(Italy) BRC Hyundai N Squadra Corse	Hyundai Elantra N TCR (2024)	105	(Hungary) Norbert Michelisz
(Italy) BRC Hyundai N Squadra Corse	Hyundai Elantra N TCR (2024)	129	(Argentina) Néstor Girolami
(Italy) BRC Hyundai N Squadra Corse	Hyundai Elantra N TCR (2024)	196	(Spain) Mikel Azcona
(Sweden) Lynk & Co Cyan Racing	Lynk & Co 03 FL TCR	111	(Sweden) Thed Björk
(Sweden) Lynk & Co Cyan Racing	Lynk & Co 03 FL TCR	112	(Uruguay) Santiago Urrutia
(Sweden) Lynk & Co Cyan Racing	Lynk & Co 03 FL TCR	155	(China) Ma Qinghua
(Sweden) Lynk & Co Cyan Racing	Lynk & Co 03 FL TCR	168	(France) Yann Ehrlacher
(Spain) Volcano Motorsport	Audi RS 3 LMS TCR (2021)	127	(France) John Filippi
(Spain) Volcano Motorsport	Audi RS 3 LMS TCR (2021)	179	(United Kingdom) Robert Huff

== Qualifying ==
Pos.	No.	Name	Team	Car	Q1	Q2
1	111	(Sweden) Thed Björk	Lynk & Co Cyan Racing	Lynk & Co 03 FL TCR	2:32.367	2:29.816
2	196	(Spain) Mikel Azcona	BRC Hyundai N Squadra Corse	Hyundai Elantra N TCR (2024)	2:32.545	2:29.839
3	168	(France) Yann Ehrlacher	Lynk & Co Cyan Racing	Lynk & Co 03 FL TCR	2:31.852	2:29.934
4	105	(Hungary) Norbert Michelisz	BRC Hyundai N Squadra Corse	Hyundai Elantra N TCR (2024)	2:33.455	2:30.568
5	129	(Argentina) Néstor Girolami	BRC Hyundai N Squadra Corse	Hyundai Elantra N TCR (2024)	2:35.144	2:31.173
6	186	(Argentina) Esteban Guerrieri	GOAT Racing	Honda Civic Type R TCR (FL5)	2:33.567	2:31.455
7	62	(Serbia) Dušan Borković	GOAT Racing	Honda Civic Type R TCR (FL5)	2:33.052	2:32.791
8	155	(China) Ma Qinghua	Lynk & Co Cyan Racing	Lynk & Co 03 FL TCR	2:31.733	2:33.663
9	1	(China) Martin Cao	Hyundai N Team	Hyundai Elantra N TCR	2:36.117	2:34.333
10	3	(Hong Kong) Andy Yan	Hyundai N Team	Hyundai Elantra N TCR	2:36.499	2:35.191
11	9	(China) David Zhu	Lynk & Co Teamwork Motorsport	Lynk & Co 03 TCR	2:36.415	2:35.478
12	199	(Italy) Marco Butti	GOAT Racing	Honda Civic Type R TCR (FL5)	2:32.519	No time
13	36	(China) Jason Zhang	Lynk & Co Teamwork Motorsport	Lynk & Co 03 TCR	2:36.690	
14	18	(China) Zhang Zhendong	Hyundai N Team Z.Speed	Hyundai Elantra N TCR	2:36.928	
15	179	(United Kingdom) Robert Huff	Volcano Motorsport	Audi RS 3 LMS TCR (2021)	2:38.091	
16	69	(Republic of Ireland) Max Hart	Hyundai N Team Z.Speed	Hyundai Elantra N TCR	2:38.533	
17	55	(China) Martin Xie	Dongfeng Honda MacPro Racing Team	Honda Civic Type R TCR (FL5)	2:38.777	
18	127	(France) John Filippi	Volcano Motorsport	Audi RS 3 LMS TCR (2021)	2:39.286	
19	2	(China) Rainey He	Hyundai N Team	Hyundai Elantra N TCR	2:41.137	
20	12	(Hong Kong) Sunny Wong	Lynk & Co Teamwork Motorsport	Lynk & Co 03 TCR	2:41.202	
21	72	(China) Juan Carlos Zhu	Lynk & Co Teamwork Motorsport	Lynk & Co 03 TCR	2:41.956	
107% time: 2:42:354
22	52	(China) Jamie Lai	Audi Sport 326 Racing Team	Audi RS 3 LMS TCR (2021)	2:42.882	
23	14	(South Korea) Hwang Do-yun	Hyundai N Team Z.Speed	Hyundai Elantra N TCR	2:43.061	
24	66	(Hong Kong) Li Guang Hua	Jun Qian Motorsport with 326 Racing Team	Lynk & Co 03 TCR	2:44.460	
25	11	(Canada) Gary Kwok	Dongfeng Honda MacPro Racing Team	Honda Civic Type R TCR (FL5)	2:44.951	
26	95	(China) Hu Heng	Jinyutu GYT Racing	Audi RS 3 LMS TCR (2021)	2:45.875	
27	51	(China) Wu Yifan	Audi Sport 326 Racing Team	Audi RS 3 LMS TCR (2021)	2:49.094	
28	28	(Hong Kong) Lo Sze Ho	Team Evolve Racing	Hyundai Elantra N TCR	2:49.916	
29	56	(Indonesia) Benny Santoso	Hyundai N Team Z.Speed	Hyundai Elantra N TCR	2:51.571	
30	82	(Indonesia) Dypo Fitramadhan	Delta Garage Racing Team	Hyundai Elantra N TCR	2:53.348	
31	87	(Hong Kong) Man Siu Ming	Team Evolve Racing	Honda Civic Type R TCR (FK8)	3:01.228	
32	112	(Uruguay) Santiago Urrutia	Lynk & Co Cyan Racing	Lynk & Co 03 FL TCR	No time	

== Race results ==
=== Race 1 ===
Pos.	No.	Name	Team	Car	Laps	Time/Retired
1	111	(Sweden) Thed Björk	Lynk & Co Cyan Racing	Lynk & Co 03 FL TCR	11	1:04:29.809
2	105	(Hungary) Norbert Michelisz	BRC Hyundai N Squadra Corse	Hyundai Elantra N TCR (2024)	11	+1.874
3	196	(Spain) Mikel Azcona	BRC Hyundai N Squadra Corse	Hyundai Elantra N TCR (2024)	11	+2.528
4	168	(France) Yann Ehrlacher	Lynk & Co Cyan Racing	Lynk & Co 03 FL TCR	11	+3.442
5	129	(Argentina) Néstor Girolami	BRC Hyundai N Squadra Corse	Hyundai Elantra N TCR (2024)	11	+7.016
6	179	(United Kingdom) Robert Huff	Volcano Motorsport	Audi RS 3 LMS TCR (2021)	11	+7.807
7	62	(Serbia) Dušan Borković	GOAT Racing	Honda Civic Type R TCR (FL5)	11	+29.074
8	1	(China) Martin Cao	Hyundai N Team	Hyundai Elantra N TCR	11	+33.002
9	36	(China) Jason Zhang	Lynk & Co Teamwork Motorsport	Lynk & Co 03 TCR	11	+35.105
10	9	(China) David Zhu	Lynk & Co Teamwork Motorsport	Lynk & Co 03 TCR	11	+40.957
11	18	(China) Zhang Zhendong	Hyundai N Team Z.Speed	Hyundai Elantra N TCR	11	+42.401
12	28	(Hong Kong) Lo Sze Ho	Team Evolve Racing	Hyundai Elantra N TCR	11	+49.283
13	112	(Uruguay) Santiago Urrutia	Lynk & Co Cyan Racing	Lynk & Co 03 FL TCR	11	+55.211
14	2	(China) Rainey He	Hyundai N Team	Hyundai Elantra N TCR	11	+1:06.771
15	14	(South Korea) Hwang Do-yun	Hyundai N Team Z.Speed	Hyundai Elantra N TCR	11	+1:08.317
16	12	(Hong Kong) Sunny Wong	Lynk & Co Teamwork Motorsport	Lynk & Co 03 TCR	11	+1:20.055
17	95	(China) Hu Heng	Jinyutu GYT Racing	Audi RS 3 LMS TCR (2021)	11	+1:33.019
18	66	(Hong Kong) Li Guang Hua	Jun Qian Motorsport with 326 Racing Team	Lynk & Co 03 TCR	11	+1:34.340
19	87	(Hong Kong) Man Siu Ming	Team Evolve Racing	Honda Civic Type R TCR (FK8)	11	+2:22.779
20	82	(Indonesia) Dypo Fitramadhan	Delta Garage Racing Team	Hyundai Elantra N TCR	10	+1 lap
21	56	(Indonesia) Benny Santoso	Hyundai N Team Z.Speed	Hyundai Elantra N TCR	9	+2 laps
NC	72	(China) Juan Carlos Zhu	Lynk & Co Teamwork Motorsport	Lynk & Co 03 TCR	4	+7 laps
DNF	199	(Italy) Marco Butti	GOAT Racing	Honda Civic Type R TCR (FL5)	3	Retired
DNF	3	(Hong Kong) Andy Yan	Hyundai N Team	Hyundai Elantra N TCR	1	Retired
DNF	69	(Republic of Ireland) Max Hart	Hyundai N Team Z.Speed	Hyundai Elantra N TCR	1	Retired
DNF	55	(China) Martin Xie	Dongfeng Honda MacPro Racing Team	Honda Civic Type R TCR (FL5)	1	Retired
DNF	186	(Argentina) Esteban Guerrieri	GOAT Racing	Honda Civic Type R TCR (FL5)	0	Retired
DNF	155	(China) Ma Qinghua	Lynk & Co Cyan Racing	Lynk & Co 03 FL TCR	0	Retired
DNF	127	(France) John Filippi	Volcano Motorsport	Audi RS 3 LMS TCR (2021)	0	Retired
DNF	52	(China) Jamie Lai	Audi Sport 326 Racing Team	Audi RS 3 LMS TCR (2021)	0	Retired
DNF	11	(Canada) Gary Kwok	Dongfeng Honda MacPro Racing Team	Honda Civic Type R TCR (FL5)	0	Retired
DNF	51	(China) Wu Yifan	Audi Sport 326 Racing Team	Audi RS 3 LMS TCR (2021)	0	Retired

=== Race 2 ===
Pos.	No.	Name	Team	Car	Laps	Time/Retired
1	62	(Serbia) Dušan Borković	GOAT Racing	Honda Civic Type R TCR (FL5)	12	39:14.582
2	186	(Argentina) Esteban Guerrieri	GOAT Racing	Honda Civic Type R TCR (FL5)	12	+3.568
3	199	(Italy) Marco Butti	GOAT Racing	Honda Civic Type R TCR (FL5)	12	+4.108
4	155	(China) Ma Qinghua	Lynk & Co Cyan Racing	Lynk & Co 03 FL TCR	12	+6.546
5	105	(Hungary) Norbert Michelisz	BRC Hyundai N Squadra Corse	Hyundai Elantra N TCR (2024)	12	+11.007
6	196	(Spain) Mikel Azcona	BRC Hyundai N Squadra Corse	Hyundai Elantra N TCR (2024)	12	+11.314
7	129	(Argentina) Néstor Girolami	BRC Hyundai N Squadra Corse	Hyundai Elantra N TCR (2024)	12	+11.486
8	111	(Sweden) Thed Björk	Lynk & Co Cyan Racing	Lynk & Co 03 FL TCR	12	+11.975
9	55	(China) Martin Xie	Dongfeng Honda MacPro Racing Team	Honda Civic Type R TCR (FL5)	12	+12.484
10	168	(France) Yann Ehrlacher	Lynk & Co Cyan Racing	Lynk & Co 03 FL TCR	12	+14.372
11	1	(China) Martin Cao	Hyundai N Team	Hyundai Elantra N TCR	12	+17.774
12	112	(Uruguay) Santiago Urrutia	Lynk & Co Cyan Racing	Lynk & Co 03 FL TCR	12	+18.200
13	127	(France) John Filippi	Volcano Motorsport	Audi RS 3 LMS TCR (2021)	12	+19.326
14	3	(Hong Kong) Andy Yan	Hyundai N Team	Hyundai Elantra N TCR	12	+21.834
15	9	(China) David Zhu	Lynk & Co Teamwork Motorsport	Lynk & Co 03 TCR	12	+22.405
16	2	(China) Rainey He	Hyundai N Team	Hyundai Elantra N TCR	12	+25.749
17	12	(Hong Kong) Sunny Wong	Lynk & Co Teamwork Motorsport	Lynk & Co 03 TCR	12	+27.737
18	72	(China) Juan Carlos Zhu	Lynk & Co Teamwork Motorsport	Lynk & Co 03 TCR	12	+28.472
19	28	(Hong Kong) Lo Sze Ho	Team Evolve Racing	Hyundai Elantra N TCR	12	+29.511
20	66	(Hong Kong) Li Guang Hua	Jun Qian Motorsport with 326 Racing Team	Lynk & Co 03 TCR	12	+33.282
21	51	(China) Wu Yifan	Audi Sport 326 Racing Team	Audi RS 3 LMS TCR (2021)	12	+33.955
22	11	(Canada) Gary Kwok	Dongfeng Honda MacPro Racing Team	Honda Civic Type R TCR (FL5)	12	+42.535
23	95	(China) Hu Heng	Jinyutu GYT Racing	Audi RS 3 LMS TCR (2021)	12	+46.844
24	87	(Hong Kong) Man Siu Ming	Team Evolve Racing	Honda Civic Type R TCR (FK8)	12	+53.191
25	82	(Indonesia) Dypo Fitramadhan	Delta Garage Racing Team	Hyundai Elantra N TCR	12	+56.661
26	56	(Indonesia) Benny Santoso	Hyundai N Team Z.Speed	Hyundai Elantra N TCR	12	+1:03.154
27	14	(South Korea) Hwang Do-yun	Hyundai N Team Z.Speed	Hyundai Elantra N TCR	12	+1:04.206
28	36	(China) Jason Zhang	Lynk & Co Teamwork Motorsport	Lynk & Co 03 TCR	11	+1 lap
29	52	(China) Jamie Lai	Audi Sport 326 Racing Team	Audi RS 3 LMS TCR (2021)	11	+1 lap
DNF	69	(Republic of Ireland) Max Hart	Hyundai N Team Z.Speed	Hyundai Elantra N TCR	8	Retired
DNF	18	(China) Zhang Zhendong	Hyundai N Team Z.Speed	Hyundai Elantra N TCR	3	Retired
DNF	179	(United Kingdom) Robert Huff	Volcano Motorsport	Audi RS 3 LMS TCR (2021)	3	Retired

== See also ==
- 2024 Macau Grand Prix
- 2024 FIA GT World Cup
