= 2024 TCR World Tour =

Motorsport contest

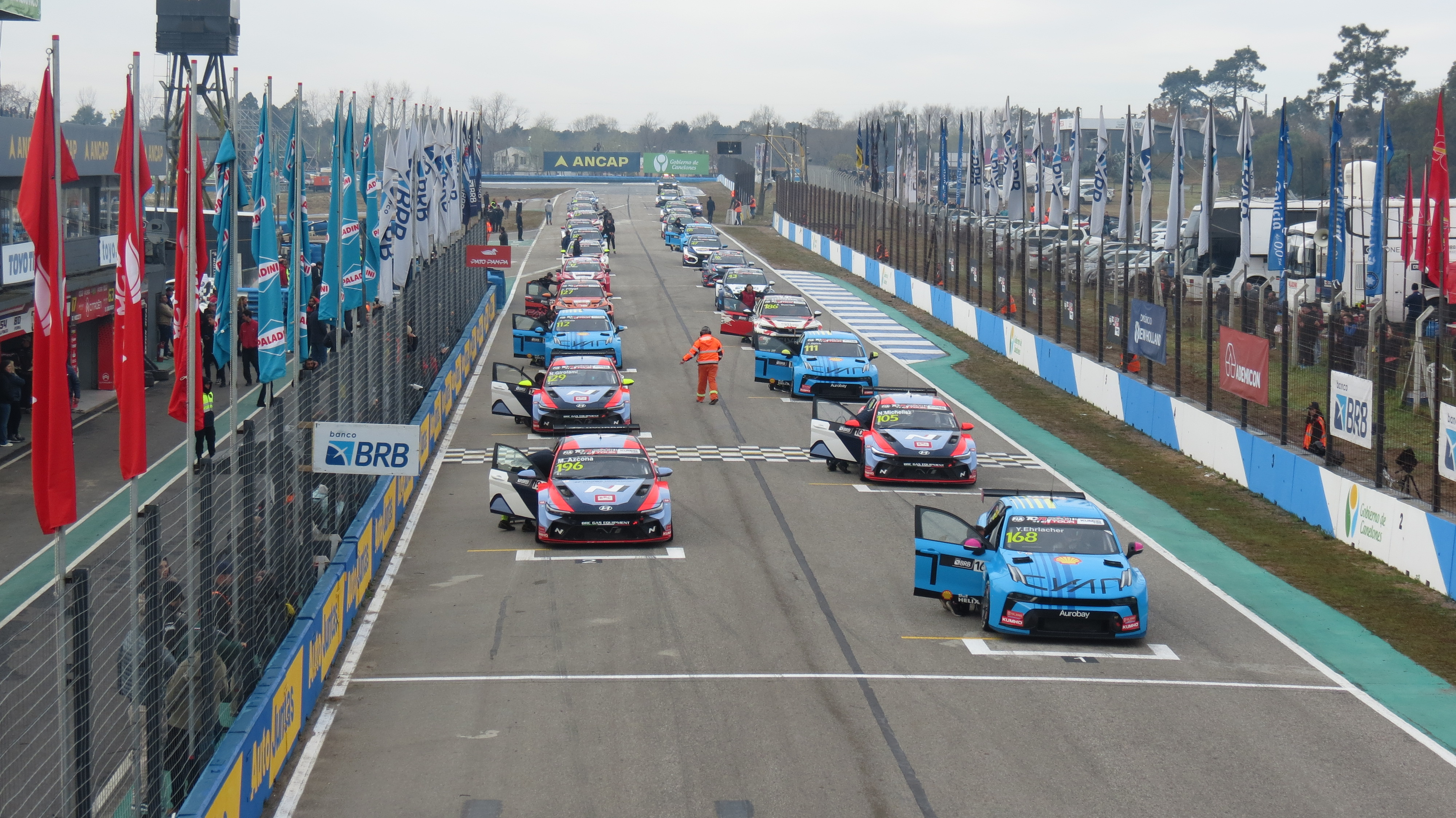
El Pinar starting grid

The 2024 Kumho FIA TCR World Tour was the second season of the TCR World Tour, an international touring car racing series for TCR cars. Effectively succeeding the WTCR series, it was the tenth season of international TCR competition dating back to the 2015 TCR International Series. The season marked the return of Fédération Internationale de l'Automobile (FIA) status for the competition after a single-year hiatus.

The season consisted of seven events selected from a number of TCR series worldwide.

== Calendar ==
The championship was initially scheduled be contested over nine rounds in Europe, Asia, Oceania, North America, South America and Africa. On February 16, the two rounds scheduled in Australia were removed from the schedule due to logistics issues for teams transporting cars in to the country, thereby reducing the championship to seven rounds. On February 28, the calendar was approved in FIA World Motorsports council in which it was announced that the Brazilian round would be held in Interlagos Circuit and the Chinese round would be shifted one month forward.

Round	Race	Circuit	Date	Partner championship
1	1	Vallelunga Circuit, Campagnano di Roma, Lazio, Italy	19–21 April	TCR Italian Series
1	2	Vallelunga Circuit, Campagnano di Roma, Lazio, Italy	19–21 April	TCR Italian Series
2	3	Circuit International Automobile Moulay El Hassan, Marrakesh, Morocco	2–4 May	Stand-alone event
2	4	Circuit International Automobile Moulay El Hassan, Marrakesh, Morocco	2–4 May	Stand-alone event
3	5	Mid-Ohio Sports Car Course, Lexington, United States	7–8 June	4 Hours of Mid-Ohio; IMSA Michelin Pilot Challenge
3	6	Mid-Ohio Sports Car Course, Lexington, United States	7–8 June	4 Hours of Mid-Ohio; IMSA Michelin Pilot Challenge
4	7	Interlagos Circuit, São Paulo, Brazil	19–21 July	TCR South America Touring Car Championship
4	8	Interlagos Circuit, São Paulo, Brazil	19–21 July	TCR South America Touring Car Championship
5	9	Autódromo Víctor Borrat Fabini, El Pinar, Uruguay	2–4 August	TCR South America Touring Car Championship
5	10	Autódromo Víctor Borrat Fabini, El Pinar, Uruguay	2–4 August	TCR South America Touring Car Championship
6	11	Zhuzhou International Circuit, Zhuzhou, China	18–20 October	TCR China Touring Car Championship
6	12	Zhuzhou International Circuit, Zhuzhou, China	18–20 October	TCR China Touring Car Championship
7	13	Guia Circuit, Macau Peninsula, Macau, China	14–17 November	Macau Guia Race; TCR China Touring Car Championship; TCR Asia Series
7	14	Guia Circuit, Macau Peninsula, Macau, China	14–17 November	Macau Guia Race; TCR China Touring Car Championship; TCR Asia Series
Map of circuit locations
2024 TCR World Tour is located in Earth

== Teams and drivers ==
Team	Car	No.	Drivers	Status	Rounds	Ref.
(Brazil) Cobra Racing Team	Toyota GR Corolla Sport TCR	07	(Brazil) Thiago Vivacqua		4–5	
(Brazil) Cobra Racing Team	Toyota GR Corolla Sport TCR	47	(Argentina) Norberto Fontana		4	
(South Korea) Team Hyundai N	Hyundai Elantra N TCR	1	(China) Martin Cao		6–7	
(South Korea) Team Hyundai N	Hyundai Elantra N TCR	2	(China) Rainey He		6–7	
(South Korea) Team Hyundai N	Hyundai Elantra N TCR	3	(Hong Kong) Andy Yan		6–7	
(China) Team Hyundai N Z.Speed	Hyundai Elantra N TCR	14	(South Korea) Hwang Do-yun		7	
(China) Team Hyundai N Z.Speed	Hyundai Elantra N TCR	18	(China) Zhendong Zhang		7	
(China) Team Hyundai N Z.Speed	Hyundai Elantra N TCR	56	(Indonesia) Benny Santoso		7	
(China) Team Hyundai N Z.Speed	Hyundai Elantra N TCR	69	(Republic of Ireland) Max Hart		7	
(Italy) PMA Motorsport	Audi RS 3 LMS TCR (2021)	1	(Italy) Sandro Pelatti		1	
(Argentina) Squadra Martino	Honda Civic Type R TCR (FK8)	3	(Brazil) Rodrigo Baptista		5	
(Argentina) Squadra Martino	Honda Civic Type R TCR (FK8)	9	(Brazil) Nelson Piquet Jr.		4	
(Argentina) Squadra Martino	Honda Civic Type R TCR (FK8)	15	(Uruguay) Enrique Maglione		4–5	
(Argentina) Squadra Martino	Honda Civic Type R TCR (FK8)	34	(Brazil) Fabio Casagrande		4–5	
(Argentina) Squadra Martino	Honda Civic Type R TCR (FK8)	47	(Argentina) Norberto Fontana		5	
(Argentina) Squadra Martino	Honda Civic Type R TCR (FL5)	60	(Uruguay) Juan Manuel Casella		4–5	
(Italy) GRT Motorsport	Audi RS 3 LMS TCR (2017)	4	(Italy) Giulio Valentini		1	
(Italy) Aikoa Racing	Audi RS 3 LMS TCR (2021)	5	(Turkey) Demir Eröge		1	
(Italy) Aikoa Racing	Audi RS 3 LMS TCR (2021)	15	(Italy) Filippo Barberi		1	
(Argentina) Paladini Racing	Toyota GR Corolla Sport TCR	5	(Argentina) Fabián Yannantuoni		4	
(Argentina) Paladini Racing	Toyota GR Corolla Sport TCR	16	(Argentina) Juan Ángel Rosso		4–5	
(Argentina) Paladini Racing	Toyota GR Corolla Sport TCR	18	(Uruguay) Carlos Silva		5	
(Argentina) Paladini Racing	Toyota GR Corolla Sport TCR	73	(Argentina) Diego Gutiérrez		4	
(Macau) MacPro Racing Team	Honda Civic Type R TCR (FL5)	7	(China) Deng Baowei		6	
(Macau) MacPro Racing Team	Honda Civic Type R TCR (FL5)	11	(Canada) Gary Kwok		7	
(Macau) MacPro Racing Team	Honda Civic Type R TCR (FL5)	55	(China) Martin Xie		6–7	
(Argentina) PMO Racing	Peugeot 308 TCR	8	(Brazil) Rafael Suzuki		4–5	
(Argentina) PMO Racing	Peugeot 308 TCR	27	(Brazil) Marcos Regadas		4	
(Argentina) PMO Racing	Peugeot 308 TCR	44	(Argentina) Leonel Pernía		4	
(Brazil) BRB Banco de Brasília by PMO Racing	Peugeot 308 TCR	43	(Brazil) Pedro Cardoso		4–5	
(China) Lynk & Co Teamwork Motorsport	Lynk & Co 03 TCR	9	(China) David Zhu		6–7	
(China) Lynk & Co Teamwork Motorsport	Lynk & Co 03 TCR	12	(Hong Kong) Sunny Wong		6–7	
(China) Lynk & Co Teamwork Motorsport	Lynk & Co 03 TCR	36	(China) Jason Zhang		6–7	
(China) Lynk & Co Teamwork Motorsport	Lynk & Co 03 TCR	72	(China) Carlos Zhu		7	
TGR Team Argentina	Toyota GR Corolla Sport TCR	17	(Argentina) Matías Rossi		4–5	
(China) Norris Racing	Honda Civic Type R TCR (FK8)	26	(Hong Kong) Tony Chan		6	
(China) Norris Racing	Honda Civic Type R TCR (FK8)	27	(Hong Kong) Chan Chunleung		6	
(Brazil) / W2 Shell V-Power (Note: Car No. 28 entered as "W2 Shell V-Power". Car No. 37 and No. 77 entered as "W2 ProGP".); (Brazil) / W2 ProGP	Cupra León VZ TCR	28	(Brazil) Galid Osman		4–5	
(Brazil) / W2 Shell V-Power; (Brazil) / W2 ProGP	Cupra León VZ TCR	77	(Brazil) Raphael Reis		4–5	
(Brazil) / W2 Shell V-Power; (Brazil) / W2 ProGP	Cupra León Competición TCR	37	(Brazil) Guilherme Reischl		4–5	
(Hong Kong) Team Evolve Racing	Hyundai Elantra N TCR	28	(Hong Kong) Lo Sze Ho		6–7	
(Hong Kong) Team Evolve Racing	Honda Civic Type R TCR (FK8)	87	(Hong Kong) Man Siu Ming		6–7	
(China) Audi Sport 326 Racing Team	Audi RS 3 LMS TCR (2021)	51	(China) Wu Yifan		6–7	
(China) Audi Sport 326 Racing Team	Audi RS 3 LMS TCR (2021)	52	(China) Lai Jingwen		6–7	
(China) Jun Qian Motorsport with 326 Racing Team	Lynk & Co 03 TCR	66	(Hong Kong) Li Guanghua		7	
(France) Team Clairet Sport	Audi RS 3 LMS TCR (2021)	30	(France) Julien Piguet		2	
(France) Team Clairet Sport	Cupra León VZ TCR	125	(Morocco) Mehdi Bennani		2	
(Italy) BF Motorsport	Audi RS 3 LMS TCR (2021)	34	(Turkey) Ramazan Kaya		1	
(China) Spark Racing	Honda Civic Type R TCR (FL5)	37	(China) Zhou Yunjie		6	
(United States) Bryan Herta Autosport	Hyundai Elantra N TCR	38	(United States) Harry Gottsacker		3	
(United States) Bryan Herta Autosport	Hyundai Elantra N TCR	98	(Canada) Mark Wilkins		3	
(Italy) MM Motorsport	Honda Civic Type R TCR (FK8)	39	(Belgium) Tony Verhulst		1	
(Italy) MM Motorsport	Honda Civic Type R TCR (FL5)	82	(Italy) Jacopo Giuseppe Cimenes		1	
(Spain) Auto Club RC2 Valles	Audi RS 3 LMS TCR (2021)	41	(Spain) Víctor Fernández		1	
(Spain) GOAT Racing	Honda Civic Type R TCR (FL5)	41	(Spain) Víctor Fernández		2	
(Spain) GOAT Racing	Honda Civic Type R TCR (FL5)	62	(Serbia) Dušan Borković	W	2–7	
(Spain) GOAT Racing	Honda Civic Type R TCR (FL5)	186	(Argentina) Esteban Guerrieri	W	All	
(Spain) GOAT Racing	Honda Civic Type R TCR (FL5)	199	(Italy) Marco Butti	W	All	
(United States) Pegram Racing	Audi RS 3 LMS TCR (2017)	72	(United States) Riley Pegram		3	
(Austria) Duller Motorsport	Opel Astra TCR	77	(Austria) Philipp Mattersdorfer		1	
(Indonesia) Delta Garage Racing Team	Hyundai Elantra N TCR	82	(Indonesia) Dypo Fitramadhan		7	
(Spain) Volcano Motorsport	Audi RS 3 LMS TCR (2021)	92	(Canada) Megan Tomlinson		3	
(Spain) Volcano Motorsport	Audi RS 3 LMS TCR (2021)	127	(France) John Filippi	W	All	
(Spain) Volcano Motorsport	Audi RS 3 LMS TCR (2021)	179	(United Kingdom) Robert Huff	W	6–7	
(Spain) Volcano Motorsport	Audi RS 3 LMS TCR (2021)	212	(Morocco) Sami Taoufik	W	1–2	
(China) Jinyutu GYT Racing	Audi RS 3 LMS TCR (2021)	95	(China) Hu Heng		6–7	
(Italy) BRC Hyundai N Squadra Corse	Hyundai Elantra N TCR (2024)	105	(Hungary) Norbert Michelisz	W	All	
(Italy) BRC Hyundai N Squadra Corse	Hyundai Elantra N TCR (2024)	129	(Argentina) Néstor Girolami	W	All	
(Italy) BRC Hyundai N Squadra Corse	Hyundai Elantra N TCR (2024)	196	(Spain) Mikel Azcona	W	All	
(Sweden) Lynk & Co Cyan Racing	Lynk & Co 03 FL TCR	111	(Sweden) Thed Björk	W	All	
(Sweden) Lynk & Co Cyan Racing	Lynk & Co 03 FL TCR	112	(Uruguay) Santiago Urrutia	W	All	
(Sweden) Lynk & Co Cyan Racing	Lynk & Co 03 FL TCR	155	(China) Ma Qing Hua	W	All	
(Sweden) Lynk & Co Cyan Racing	Lynk & Co 03 FL TCR	168	(France) Yann Ehrlacher	W	All	

Icon	Status
W	TCR World Tour entries not eligible to score points in the local series

== Results ==
Rnd.		Circuit/Location	Pole position	Fastest lap	Winning driver	Winning team
1	1	(Italy) Vallelunga Circuit	(Hungary) Norbert Michelisz	(Argentina) Esteban Guerrieri	(Hungary) Norbert Michelisz	(Italy) BRC Hyundai N Squadra Corse
1	2	(Italy) Vallelunga Circuit		(Argentina) Néstor Girolami	(Argentina) Néstor Girolami	(Italy) BRC Hyundai N Squadra Corse
2	3	(Morocco) Circuit International Automobile Moulay El Hassan	(France) Yann Ehrlacher	(Italy) Marco Butti	(France) Yann Ehrlacher	(Sweden) Lynk & Co Cyan Racing
2	4	(Morocco) Circuit International Automobile Moulay El Hassan		(China) Ma Qing Hua	(China) Ma Qing Hua	(Sweden) Lynk & Co Cyan Racing
3	5	(United States) Mid-Ohio Sports Car Course	(Spain) Mikel Azcona	(Spain) Mikel Azcona	(Sweden) Thed Björk	(Sweden) Lynk & Co Cyan Racing
3	6	(United States) Mid-Ohio Sports Car Course		(Hungary) Norbert Michelisz	(France) Yann Ehrlacher	(Sweden) Lynk & Co Cyan Racing
4	7	(Brazil) Interlagos Circuit	(Uruguay) Santiago Urrutia	(Argentina) Esteban Guerrieri	(Argentina) Esteban Guerrieri	(Spain) GOAT Racing
4	8	(Brazil) Interlagos Circuit		(France) Yann Ehrlacher	(Hungary) Norbert Michelisz	(Italy) BRC Hyundai N Squadra Corse
5	9	(Uruguay) Autódromo Víctor Borrat Fabini	(France) Yann Ehrlacher	(France) Yann Ehrlacher	(France) Yann Ehrlacher	(Sweden) Lynk & Co Cyan Racing
5	10	(Uruguay) Autódromo Víctor Borrat Fabini		(France) Yann Ehrlacher	(Sweden) Thed Björk	(Sweden) Lynk & Co Cyan Racing
6	11	(China) Zhuzhou International Circuit	(Uruguay) Santiago Urrutia	(Sweden) Thed Björk	(Spain) Mikel Azcona	(Italy) BRC Hyundai N Squadra Corse
6	12	(China) Zhuzhou International Circuit		(China) Ma Qing Hua	(China) Ma Qing Hua	(Sweden) Lynk & Co Cyan Racing
7	13	(Macau) Guia Circuit	(Sweden) Thed Björk	(Spain) Mikel Azcona	(Sweden) Thed Björk	(Sweden) Lynk & Co Cyan Racing
7	14	(Macau) Guia Circuit		(Serbia) Dušan Borković	(Serbia) Dušan Borković	(Spain) GOAT Racing

== Points standings ==
Scoring system

Position	1st	2nd	3rd	4th	5th	6th	7th	8th	9th	10th	11th	12th	13th	14th	15th
Qualifying	15	10	8	6	4	2	—N/a								
Races	30	25	22	20	18	16	14	12	10	8	6	4	3	2	1

=== Drivers ===
Pos.	Driver	ITA (Italy)		MAR (Morocco)		USA (United States)		BRA (Brazil)		URU (Uruguay)		CHN (China)		MAC (Macau)		Pts.
1	(Hungary) Norbert Michelisz	1^{1}	6	3^{3}	11	2^{2}	5	6	1	4^{3}	4	7^{5}	8	2^{4}	5	323
2	(Sweden) Thed Björk	6^{5}	5	8	9	1^{3}	6	5^{6}	2	3^{5}	1	3^{2}	10	1^{1}	8	312
3	(Spain) Mikel Azcona	4^{4}	4	5^{6}	13	3^{1}	4	8	9	2^{2}	5	1^{4}	9	3^{2}	6	295
4	(Argentina) Esteban Guerrieri	3^{3}	8	9	2	5^{5}	3	1^{2}	4	6	3	2^{6}	5	Ret^{6}	2	291
5	(France) Yann Ehrlacher	2^{2}	14	1^{1}	Ret	6	1	4^{3}	20	1^{1}	21	4^{3}	3	4^{3}	10	287
6	(Argentina) Néstor Girolami	10	1	4^{4}	5	4^{6}	8	13^{5}	11	5^{4}	8	8	2	5^{5}	7	238
7	(Uruguay) Santiago Urrutia	7	2	2^{2}	8	DSQ	DSQ	2^{1}	5	7^{6}	DSQ	5^{1}	4	13	12	220
8	(China) Ma Qing Hua	8	9	7	1	7^{4}	2	7	3	16	7	13	1	Ret	4	214
9	(Italy) Marco Butti	5^{6}	3	Ret	7	12	10	3^{5}	6	Ret	10	6	6	Ret	3	174
10	(Serbia) Dušan Borković			Ret	3	9	7	9	Ret	11	6	11	11	7	1	134
11	(France) John Filippi	9	7	6^{5}	4	8	9	Ret	7	DNS	9	24	Ret	Ret	13	113
12	(United Kingdom) Robert Huff											9	7	6	Ret	40
13	(Brazil) Pedro Cardoso							15	18	8	2					38
14	(China) Martin Cao											12	13	8	11	25
15	(Morocco) Sami Taoufik	Ret	Ret	10	6											24
16	(Brazil) Rafael Suzuki							10	8	14	14					24
17	(Argentina) Juan Ángel Rosso							12	17	9	11					20
18	(China) Jason Zhang											10	16	9	28	18
19	(China) David Zhu											14	12	10	15	15
20	(Morocco) Mehdi Bennani			11	10											14
21	(Italy) Sandro Pelatti	12	10													12
22	(China) Martin Xie											Ret	Ret	Ret	9	10
23	(Brazil) Raphael Reis							17	10	15	15					10
24	(Canada) Megan Tomlinson					13	11									9
25	(Argentina) Matías Rossi							23	Ret	10	22					8
26	(Canada) Mark Wilkins					10	Ret									8
27	(Spain) Víctor Fernández	19†	Ret	12	12											8
28	(Turkey) Demir Eröge	17	11													6
29	(Brazil) Nelson Piquet Jr.							11	19							6
30	(Italy) Filippo Barberi	11	Ret													6
31	(United States) Harry Gottsacker					11	Ret									6
32	(China) Zhendong Zhang													11	Ret	6
33	(Austria) Philipp Mattersdorfer	14	12													6
34	(Argentina) Fabián Yannantuoni							14	12							6
35	(Uruguay) Juan Manuel Casella							16	Ret	13	13					6
36	(Hong Kong) Andy Yan											15	14	Ret	14	5
37	(Argentina) Norberto Fontana							19	16	Ret	12					4
38	(Hong Kong) Lo Sze Ho											Ret	19	12	19	4
39	(United States) Riley Pegram					Ret	12									4
40	(Brazil) Rodrigo Baptista									12	Ret					4
41	(Turkey) Ramazan Kaya	18	13													3
42	(Uruguay) Enrique Maglione							Ret	13	20	19					3
43	(Italy) Jacopo Giuseppe Cimenes	13	Ret													3
44	(China) Rainey He											20	18	14	16	2
45	(Argentina) Diego Gutiérrez							21	14							2
46	(Belgium) Tony Verhulst	15	16†													1
47	(Italy) Giulio Valentini	16	15													1
48	(Brazil) Fabio Casagrande							Ret	15	17	17					1
49	(China) Wu Yifan											19	15	Ret	21	1
50	(South Korea) Hwang Do-yun													15	27	1
51	(Hong Kong) Sunny Wong											18	17	16	17	0
52	(Hong Kong) Chan Chunleung											16	21			0
53	(Brazil) Galid Osman							Ret	Ret	Ret	16					0
54	(China) Deng Baowei											17	20			0
55	(China) Hu Heng											23	Ret	17	23	0
56	(Brazil) Thiago Vivacqua							18	Ret	Ret	18					0
57	(Uruguay) Carlos Silva							18	20							0
58	(Hong Kong) Li Guanghua													18	20	0
59	(China) Carlos Zhu													Ret	18	0
60	(Brazil) Guilherme Reischl							20	Ret	19	Ret					0
61	(Hong Kong) Man Siu Ming											25	23	19	24	0
62	(Indonesia) Dypo Fitramadhan													20	25	0
63	(China) Zhou Yunjie											21	24			0
64	(Indonesia) Benny Santoso													21	26	0
65	(Hong Kong) Tony Chan											22	25			0
66	(Argentina) Leonel Pernía							22	Ret							0
67	(China) Lai Jing Wen											Ret	22	Ret	29	0
68	(Canada) Gary Kwok													Ret	22	0
–	(France) Julien Piguet			Ret	Ret											–
–	(Brazil) Marcos Regadas							Ret	Ret							–
–	(Republic of Ireland) Max Hart													Ret	Ret	–
Pos.	Driver	ITA (Italy)		MAR (Morocco)		USA (United States)		BRA (Brazil)		URU (Uruguay)		CHN (China)		MAC (Macau)		Pts.

Colour	Result
Gold	Winner
Silver	Second place
Bronze	Third place
Green	Points classification
Blue	Non-points classification
Blue	Non-classified finish (NC)
Purple	Retired, not classified (Ret)
Red	Did not qualify (DNQ)
Red	Did not pre-qualify (DNPQ)
Black	Disqualified (DSQ)
White	Did not start (DNS)
White	Withdrew (WD)
White	Race cancelled (C)
Blank	Did not practice (DNP)
Blank	Did not arrive (DNA)
Blank	Excluded (EX)

^{1} ^{2} ^{3} ^{4} ^{5} ^{6} – Points-scoring position in qualifying

† – Drivers did not finish the race, but were classified as they completed over 75% of the race distance.

=== Teams (top 15) ===
Points are given only to the two highest-classified cars of each team in every race and qualifying.

Pos.	Team	Points
1	(Sweden) Cyan Racing Lynk & Co	735
2	(Italy) BRC Hyundai N Squadra Corse	672
3	(Spain) GOAT Racing	521
4	(Spain) Volcano Motorsport	184
5	(Argentina) PMO Racing	64
6	(mainland China) Lynk & Co Teamwork Motorsport	34
7	(South Korea) Team Hyundai N	32
8	(Argentina) Paladini Racing	28
9	(Argentina) Squadra Martino	20
10	(United States) Bryan Herta Autosport	14
11	(France) Team Clairet Sport	14
12	(Italy) PMA Motorsport	13
13	(Italy) Aikoa Racing	12
14	(Macau) MacPro Racing Team	10
15	(Brazil) W2 Pro GP	10
