= Marco Butti =

Italian racing driver

- Nationality: (Italy) Italian
- Born: 29 March 2005 (age 21) Como, Italy

TCR World Tour career
- Debut season: 2023
- Current team: GOAT Racing
- Categorisation: FIA Silver
- Car number: 199
- Starts: 18
- Wins: 0
- Podiums: 3
- Poles: 0
- Fastest laps: 1
- Best finish: 9th in 2024

Marco Butti (born 29 March 2005 in Como, Italy) is a racing driver, who currently competes in touring car racing, sports car racing and rallying.

== Racing career ==
=== Karting ===
At the age of five, he began Karting, when he received his first kart as a gift from his father, Fabio Butti, owner of the family dealership Butticars and several rally teams. Since then, Butti participated in various regional, national and international championships, achieving notable victories and titles.

=== Touring car racing ===
In 2019, Butti made the transition to car racing, testing a Formula 4 car at the Circuit Ricardo Tormo. In 2020 he went on to compete in the Clio RS Cup. In 2021 he debuted in TCR Touring Car competitions, participating in the TCR Italy Touring Car Championship, Coppa Italia Turismo and TCR Europe Endurance. In these championships he earned multiple podium finishes.

In 2023, Butti was selected for Hyundai Motorsport's junior program, being mentored by former driver Gabriele Tarquini. He participated in the TCR Italy Touring Car Championship with Target Competition, driving a Hyundai Elantra N TCR, achieving several successes, including victories in the Imola races in April and October, finishing third in the overall championship and first in the Under-25 classification. He also competed in two rounds of the TCR World Tour at Vallelunga and Macau, where he stood out for his competitive times.

In 2024, Butti competed full-time in the TCR World Tour as a Honda driver, within the GOAT Racing team, driving a Honda Civic Type R TCR. Throughout the season, Butti reached the podium three times, in the opening round at Vallelunga Circuit, in the middle of season at the Interlagos Circuit and in the Macau Guia Race at the end of the season.

=== Rallying ===
At the end of 2021, Butti ventured into Rallying, participating in the Monza Rally Show with a car in the R5 category, where he won the general classification, at the age of 16.

In December 2023, Butti competed in two rallies with a Hyundai i20 N Rally2 from the Friulmotor team, standing out with a victory at the Pavia Rally Circuit.

=== Sports car racing ===
In 2022, Butti joined the Audi Sport Italia team in the Italian GT Championship. In February, he won the 6th Pavia Motor Rally Show, maintaining a winning streak.

In addition, Butti participated in two races of the 2023 Italian GT Championship, obtaining a fifth place in Pergusa and two second places in Monza.

Butti also competed in the Italian round of the 2024 GT World Challenge Europe Sprint Cup at Misano World Circuit Marco Simoncelli, driving a Lamborghini Huracán GT3 of the Eurodent GSM Team. Butti was also part of the Nova Race squad in the opening round of the 2024 Italian GT Eundrance Championship at Vallelunga.

== Racing record ==
=== Career summary ===
Season	Series	Team	Races	Wins	Poles	F/Laps	Podiums	Points	Position
2021	TCR Italy Touring Car Championship	Élite Motorsport	12	0	0	0	0	41	15th
2022	TCR Europe Touring Car Series	Élite Motorsport by Comtoyou	9	0	0	1	0	78	15th
2022	ADAC TCR Germany Touring Car Championship	Élite Motorsport	2	0	0	0	0	0	14th
2022	TCR Italy Touring Car Championship	Next Motorsport	2	0	0	0	0	0	NC
2022	Italian GT Sprint Championship - GT3 Am	Audi Sport Italia	4	2	1	2	4	?	?
2023	TCR Italy Touring Car Championship	Target Competition	12	3	2	0	4	332	4th
2023	TCR Europe Touring Car Series	Target Competition	0	0	0	0	0	0	NC
2023	TCR World Tour	BRC Hyundai N Squadra Corse	4	0	0	0	0	34	19th
2023	Italian GT Sprint Championship - GT3 Pro	Audi Sport Italia							
2024	TCR World Tour	GOAT Racing	14	0	0	1	3	174	9th
2024	TCR South America Touring Car Championship	GOAT Racing	4	0	0	0	1	62	22nd
2024	GT World Challenge Europe Sprint Cup	Eurodent GSM Team	2	0	0	0	0	0	NC
2024	Italian GT Endurance Championship - GT3	Nova Race							
2024	FIA Motorsport Games Touring Car Cup	Team Italy	1	0	0	0	0	N/A	DSQ
2025	TCR Europe Touring Car Series	MM Motorsport	12	1	1	3	6	174	6th
2025	TCR World Tour	GOAT Racing	7	0	0	0	0	27	21st
2026	TCR Europe Touring Car Series	Monlau Motorsport	12	1	1	1	4	206	1st
2026	Porsche Carrera Cup Italy	The Driving Experiences	10	0	0	0	0	65	11th
