= Dušan Borković =

Serbian racing driver (born 1984)

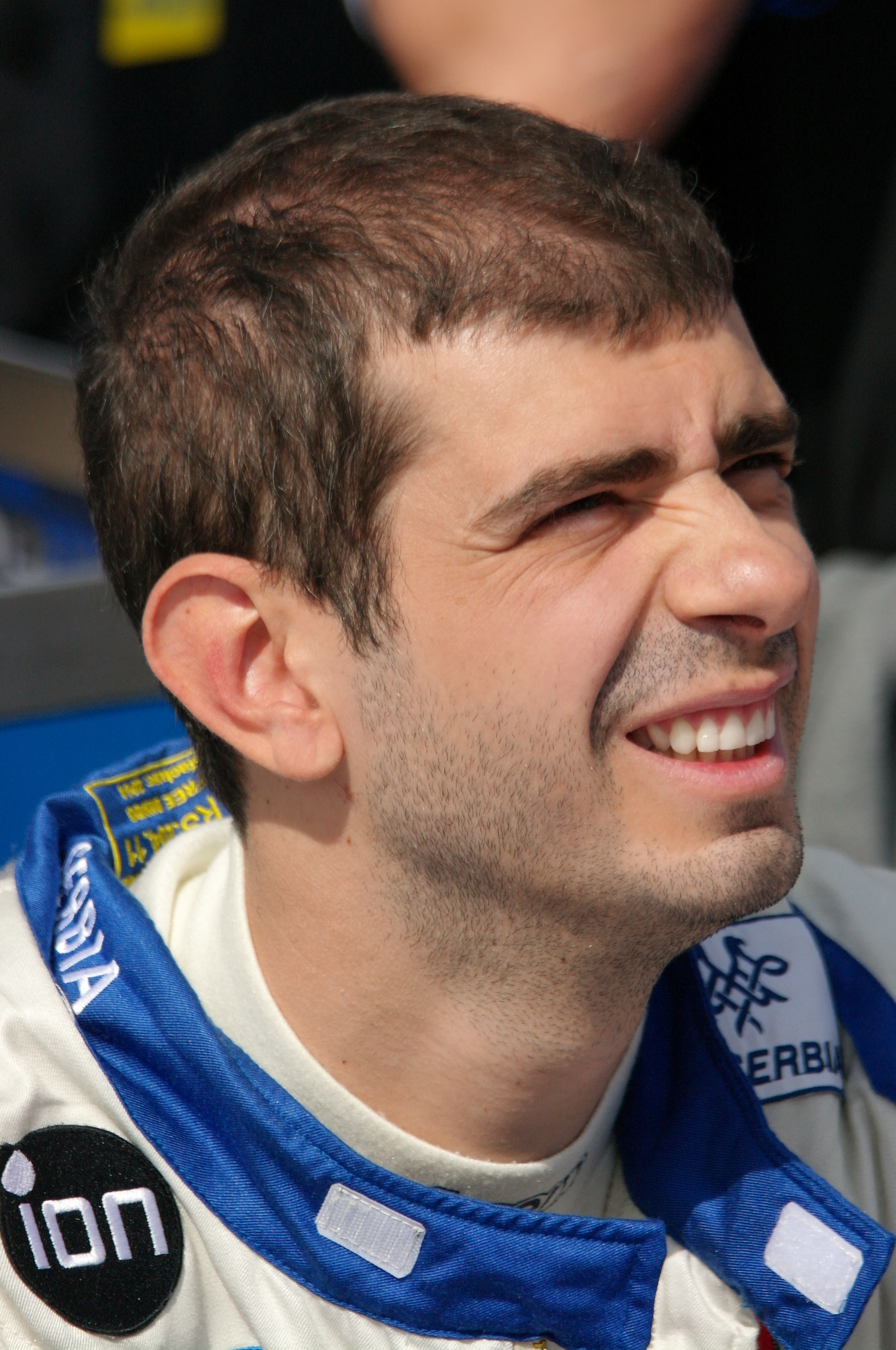
- Borković at the 2014 FIA WTCC Race of Belgium.
- Nationality: Serbian
- Born: 16 September 1984 (age 42) Pančevo, SR Serbia, Yugoslavia

TCR International Series career
- Debut season: 2016
- Current team: Team Borkovic
- Categorisation: FIA Silver
- Car number: 62
- Former teams: B3 Racing Team Hungary
- Starts: 53
- Wins: 5
- Poles: 3
- Fastest laps: 0
- Best finish: 2nd Suzuka, Japan FIA WTCC in 2014

Previous series
- 2015 2015-2014 2013 2011–2012 2002–2008: European Touring Car Cup; World Touring Car Championship; European Touring Car Cup; FIA European Hill Climb Championship; Serbian National-Class Championship

Championship titles
- 2020 2015 2012 2010 2005–08: TCR Eastern Europe Trophy; European Touring Car Cup; European Touring Car Cup; European Hill Climb Championship; Serbian Hill Climbing Championship; Serbian National-Class Championship

Dušan Borković (Serbian Cyrillic: Душан Борковић; born 16 September 1984) is a Serbian racing driver and politician.

The tallest professional driver in the world at 2.07 m (6 ft 9 in), Borković is a three-time European champion, having won the 2012 European Hill Climb Championship, 2015 European Touring Car Cup and 2020 TCR Eastern Europe. He also won the second Macau race of the 2024 TCR World Tour, and is a three-time Serbia Rally winner, in 2019, 2020 and 2022.

== Racing career ==
=== Karting ===
Borković started his karting career in 1994. He became the Yugoslavian karting champion six years in a row from 1995 to 2000.

=== Serbian National-Class and Hill Climbing ===
After karting for six years, Borković made his autoracing debut in 2002 in the Serbian National-Class.

From 2002 to 2008, Borković competed in the Serbian National-Class championship where he finished second in his first season. He won the championship from 2005 to 2008.

After racing in the Serbian National-Class for six years, Borković switched to Hill Climb in 2010.

Borković won the Serbian Hill Climb Championship is his first season, winning all five events in his Mitsubishi Lancer Evo 9.

The following season, Borković switched to the European Hill Climb Championship. Coming in second in his first season, he went on to win it in 2012 still driving his Mitsubishi Lancer Evo 9.

=== European Touring Car Cup 2013 ===
After winning the European Hill Climb Championship in 2012, Borković switched to the European Touring Car Cup. In his debut season in European Touring Car Cup (ETCC), he took the third place in the Super 2000 class. He took third position in both Brno races and qualifications. He had five podiums and one win. He drove the first three meetings in a SEAT León TFSI, before switching to a Chevrolet Cruze LT for the final two meetings. He had 48 points in overall standings. In front of him was Maťo Homola with 74 points, and Petr Fulín in first place with 88 points.

=== World Touring Car Championship 2014–2015 ===
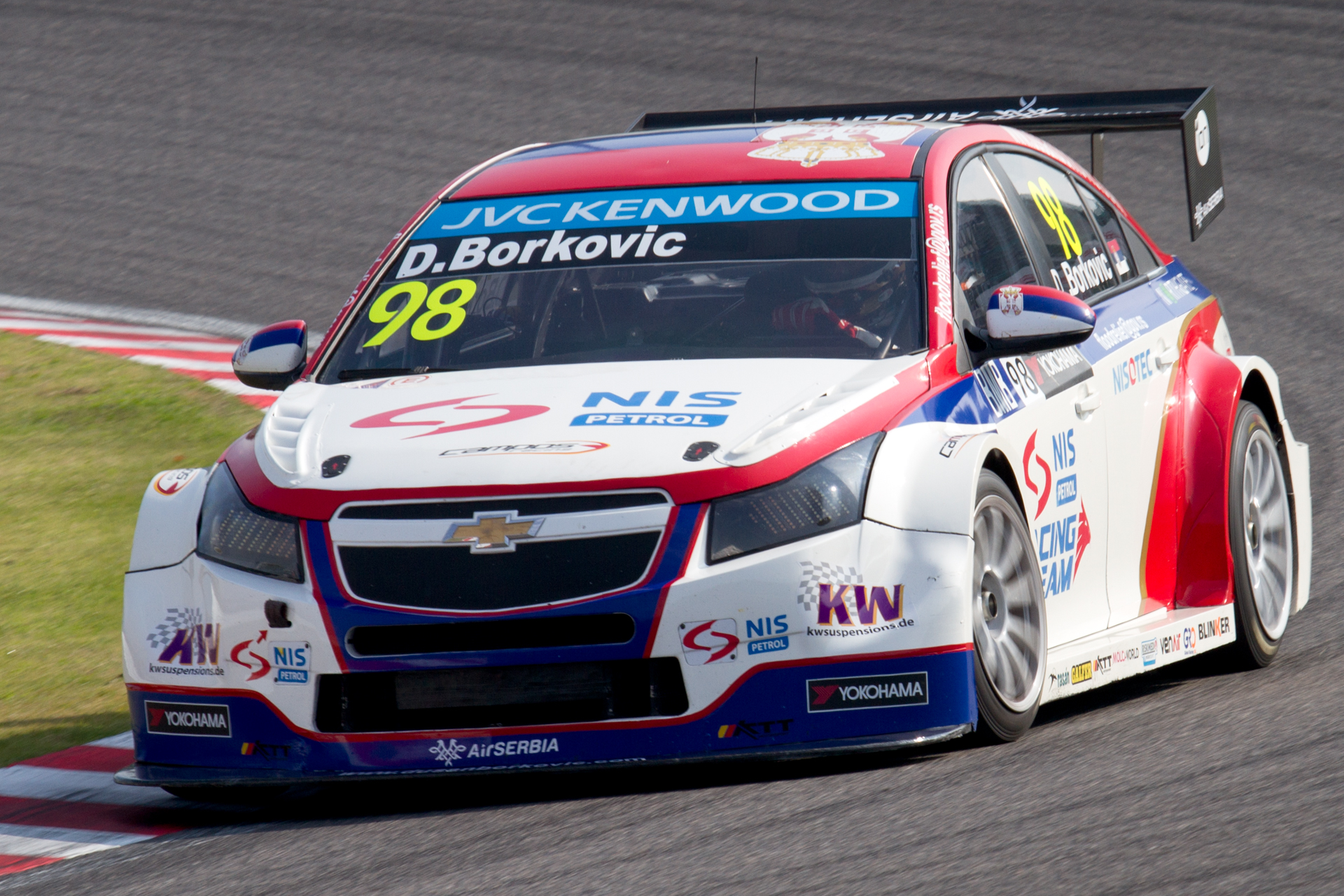
Borković competing in the 2014 World Touring Car Championship.

On 20 November 2013, it was announced that Borković would race in the World Touring Car Championship. Borković would join Campos Racing driving one of their TC1 RML Chevrolet Cruze's. On 26 October 2014, he delivered his first ever podium. In the 2015 season, he started with new team Proteam Racing driving a Honda Civic WTCC. Borković only drove the first round in Argentina before withdrawing from the World Touring Car Championship. His withdrawal was because Proteam Racing was not able to cater for the 30-year-old's height, as well as there being further dissatisfaction over the specification of the team's Honda Civic WTCC.

=== European Touring Car Cup 2015 ===
Considering problems with the sitting position and the car, Borković decided not to continue competing in World Touring Car Championship. He made the decision with his team to transfer to European Touring Car Cup in Hungaroring on 2 and 3 May. Borković drove the newest SEAT León Cup Racer in European Touring Car Cup with his NIS Petrol Racing Team. He became ETCC champion in Single make trophy class.

== Political career ==
Borković was a member of the National Assembly of Serbia from 2016 to 2020. He received the eleventh position on the Serbian Progressive Party's Aleksandar Vučić – Serbia Is Winning electoral list in the 2016 Serbian parliamentary election. (Borković was not himself a member of the party but ran as an aligned independent.) The list won a landslide victory with 131 out of 250 parliamentary mandates, and Borković was sworn in as a legislator on 3 June 2016. In the assembly, he was a deputy member of the parliamentary committee on spatial planning, transport, infrastructure, and telecommunications and the committee on education, science, technological development, and the information society. He did not seek re-election in 2020.

== Racing record ==
=== Complete European Touring Car Cup results ===
(key) (Races in bold indicate pole position) (Races in italics indicate the fastest lap)

Year	Team	Car	1	2	3	4	5	6	7	8	9	10	11	12	DC	Points
2013	NIS Petrol Racing Team	SEAT León TFSI	MNZ; 1; 16	MNZ; 2; 9	SVK; 1 Ret	SVK; 2 DNS	SAL; 1; 1	SAL; 2; 12							**3rd**	**48**
2013	NIS Petrol Racing Team	Chevrolet Cruze LT							PER; 1; 2	PER; 2; 3	BRN; 1; 3	BRN; 2; 3			**3rd**	**48**
2015	NIS Petrol Racing Team	SEAT León Cup Racer	**HUN**; **1**; 5	HUN; 1; 1	SVK; 1; 3	SVK; 2; 1	**LEC**; **1**; 1	LEC; 2; 2	BRN; 1; 2	BRN; 2; 1	ZOL; 1; 3	ZOL; 2; 1	**PER**; **1** Ret	PER; 2; 13	1st	110

=== Complete World Touring Car Championship results ===
(key) (Races in bold indicate pole position) (Races in italics indicate the fastest lap)

Year	Team	Car	1	2	3	4	5	6	7	8	9	10	11	12	13	14	15	16	17	18	19	20	21	22	23	24	DC	Points
2014	NIS Petrol by Campos Racing	Chevrolet RML Cruze TC1	MAR; 1; 6	MAR; 2 Ret	FRA; 1; 14	FRA; 2; 7	HUN; 1; 12	HUN; 2; 11	SVK; 1; 12	SVK; 2 C	AUT; 1 Ret	AUT; 2 Ret	RUS; 1 Ret	RUS; 2; 11	BEL; 1; 9	BEL; 2 Ret	ARG; 1 Ret	ARG; 2 DSQ	BEI; 1 Ret	BEI; 2 DNS	CHN; 1; 12	CHN; 2; 9	JPN; 1; 8	JPN; 2; 2	MAC; 1	MAC; 2	14th	41
2015	Proteam Racing	Honda Civic WTCC	ARG; 1; 11	ARG; 2 Ret	MAR; 1 DNS	MAR; 2 DNS	HUN; 1 WD	HUN; 2 WD	GER; 1	GER; 2	RUS; 1	RUS; 2	SVK; 1	SVK; 2	FRA; 1	FRA; 2	POR; 1	POR; 2	JPN; 1	JPN; 2	CHN; 1	CHN; 2	THA; 1	THA; 2	QAT; 1	QAT; 2	NC	0

=== Complete TCR International Series results ===
(key) (Races in bold indicate pole position) (Races in italics indicate the fastest lap)

Year	Team	Car	1	2	3	4	5	6	7	8	9	10	11	12	13	14	15	16	17	18	19	20	21	22	DC	Points
2016	B3 Racing Team Hungary	SEAT León TCR	BHR; 1; 6	BHR; 2; 3	EST; 1; 12	EST; 2 Ret	**SPA**; **1**; 3	SPA; 2 Ret	IMO; 1; 12†	IMO; 2 DNS	SAL; 1; 11†	SAL; 2 DNS	**OSC**; **1**; 2	OSC; 2; 2	SOC; 1; 14	SOC; 2; 6	CHA; 1; 7	CHA; 2; 3	MRN; 1; 7	MRN; 2; 2	SEP; 1; 6	SEP; 2; 4	MAC; 1; 4	MAC; 2; 5	7th	173
2017	GE-Force	Alfa Romeo Giulietta TCR	RIM; 1; 9	RIM; 2; 4	BHR; 1; 4	BHR; 2; 1	SPA; 1; 16	SPA; 2; 11	MNZ; 1; 9	MNZ; 2 Ret	SAL; 1; 1	SAL; 2 Ret	HUN; 1 NC	HUN; 2 Ret	OSC; 1 Ret	OSC; 2 Ret	CHA; 1; 2	CHA; 2; 6	ZHE; 1 Ret	ZHE; 2 DNS	DUB; 1; 9	DUB; 2; 8			8th	116

^{†} Driver did not finish the race, but was classified as he completed over 75% of the race distance.

=== Complete TCR Europe Touring Car Series results ===
(key) (Races in bold indicate pole position) (Races in italics indicate the fastest lap)

Year	Team	Car	1	2	3	4	5	6	7	8	9	10	11	12	13	14	DC	Points
2018	Target Competition	Hyundai i30 N TCR	**LEC**; **1**; 1^{1}	LEC; 2; 1	ZAN; 1; 5^{5}	ZAN; 2; 18	SPA; 1; 4	SPA; 2; 7	HUN; 1; 1^{4}	HUN; 2 Ret	ASS; 1; 6	ASS; 2; 3	MNZ; 1 DSQ	MNZ; 2 DSQ	CAT; 1; 2^{4}	CAT; 2 Ret	3rd	154
2019	Autodis Racing by Target Competition	Hyundai i30 N TCR	HUN; 1; 4	HUN; 2; 4	HOC; 1; 14	HOC; 2 Ret	SPA; 1; 12	SPA; 2 Ret	RBR; 1; 6	RBR; 2 DSQ	OSC; 1	OSC; 2	CAT; 1	CAT; 2	MNZ; 1	MNZ; 2	18th	85
2021	Comtoyou Racing	Audi RS 3 LMS TCR	SVK; 1; 7	SVK; 2; 10	LEC; 1; 14	LEC; 2; 11	ZAN; 1; 3	ZAN; 2; 4	SPA; 1; 12	SPA; 2; 14	NÜR; 1; 8	NÜR; 2; 9	MNZ; 1; 7	MNZ; 2; 7	CAT; 1 DNS	CAT; 2 DNS	12th	192
2023	Target Competition	Hyundai Elantra N TCR	ALG; 1; 12^{5}	ALG; 2 Ret	PAU; 1; 1^{2}	PAU; 2; 2	SPA; 1 Ret^{6}	SPA; 2; 15	HUN; 1; 15^{2}	HUN; 2; 12	LEC; 1 WD	LEC; 2 WD	MNZ; 1	MNZ; 2	CAT; 1 WD	CAT; 2 WD	8th	190
2024	GOAT Racing	Honda Civic Type R TCR (FL5)	VAL; 1; 7^{6}	VAL; 2; 10	ZOL; 1	ZOL; 2	SAL; 1	SAL; 2	SPA; 1	SPA; 2	BRN; 1	BRN; 2	CRT; 1	CRT; 2			16th	29

=== Complete TCR World Tour results ===
(key) (Races in bold indicate pole position) (Races in italics indicate fastest lap)

Year	Team	Car	1	2	3	4	5	6	7	8	9	10	11	12	13	14	15	16	17	18	19	20	21	DC	Points
2023	Target Competition	Hyundai Elantra N TCR	ALG; 1; 12	ALG; 2 Ret	SPA; 1 Ret	SPA; 2; 15	VAL; 1	VAL; 2	HUN; 1; 15	HUN; 2; 12	ELP; 1	ELP; 2	VIL; 1	VIL; 2	SYD; 1	SYD; 2	SYD; 3	BAT; 1	BAT; 2	BAT; 3	MAC; 1	MAC; 2		37th	10
2024	GOAT Racing	Honda Civic Type R TCR (FL5)	VAL; 1	VAL; 2	MRK; 1 Ret	MRK; 2; 3	MOH; 1; 9	MOH; 2; 7	SAP; 1; 9	SAP; 2 Ret	ELP; 1; 11	ELP; 2; 6	ZHZ; 1; 11	ZHZ; 2; 11	MAC; 1; 7	MAC; 2; 1								10th	134
2025	GOAT Racing	Honda Civic Type R TCR (FL5)	AHR; 1	AHR; 2	AHR; 3	CRT; 1	CRT; 2	CRT; 3	MNZ; 1	MNZ; 2	CVR; 1 Ret	CVR; 2; 9	BEN; 1	BEN; 2	BEN; 3	INJ; 1; 8	INJ; 2; 5	INJ; 3; 14	ZHZ; 1	ZHZ; 2	ZHZ; 3	MAC; 1	MAC; 2	17th	42

Sporting positions
Preceded by Dmitry Bragin	European Touring Car Cup; Single Makes Trophy Champion; 2015	Succeeded by None (Class disbanded)
