= GOAT Racing =

Racing team

(Spain) GOAT Racing
- Founded: 2024
- Base: Barcelona, Spain
- Team principal(s): Rubén Fernández Gil (team principal); Pepe Oriola (team manager)
- Current series: TCR World Tour; TCR Europe; TCR Spain
- Current drivers: (Argentina) Esteban Guerrieri (Argentina) Ignacio Montenegro (Italy) Marco Butti (Serbia) Dušan Borković (Spain) Felipe Fernández Gil

GOAT Racing is a Spanish racing team.

The team currently enters a pair of Honda Civic Type R TCR (FL5) in 2025 TCR World Tour with technical support from JAS Motorsport.

== History ==
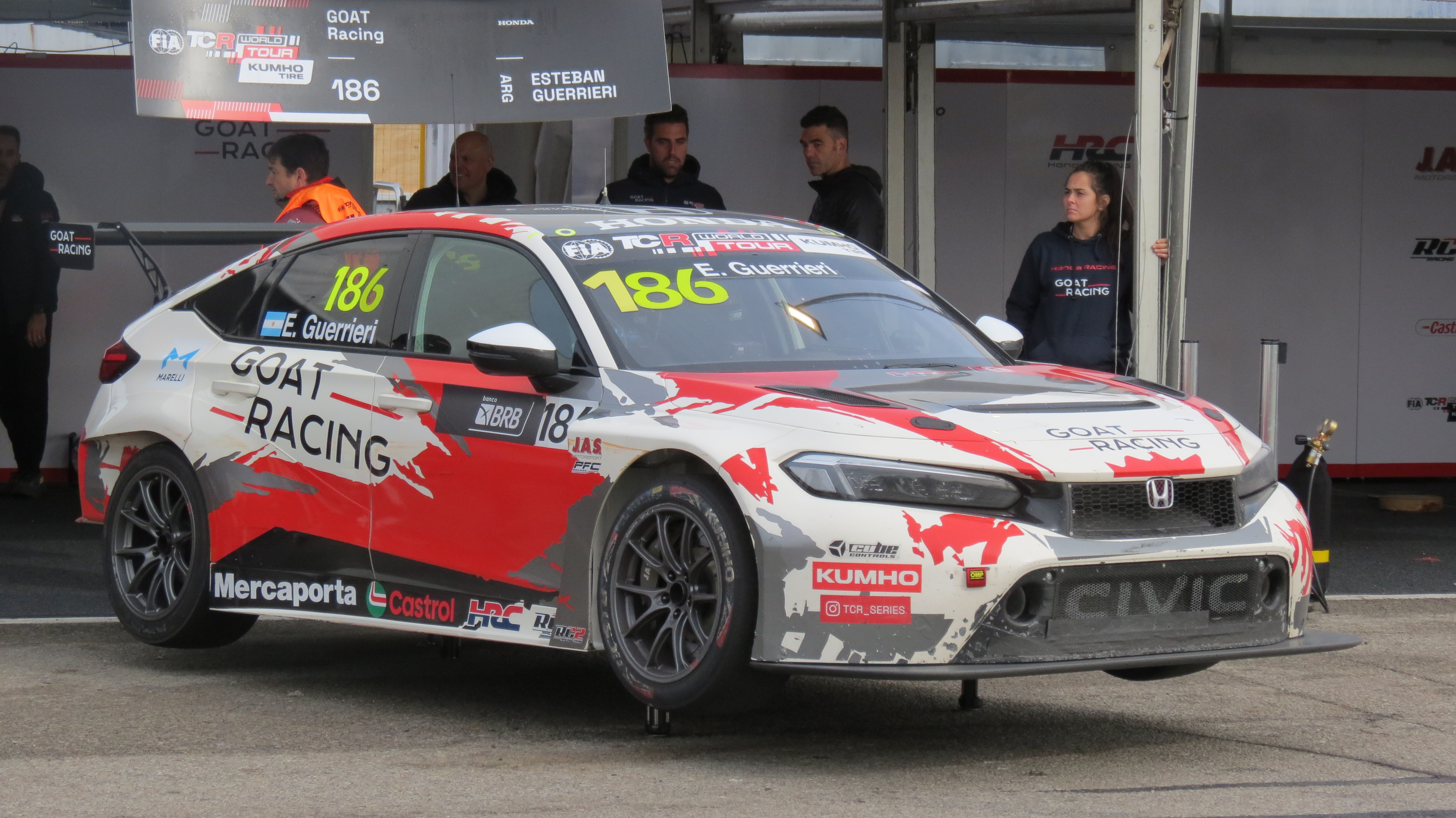
Honda Civic Type R TCR (FL5) of GOAT Racing in the 2024 TCR World Tour

The team was formed in 2024 by Spanish racing driver Rubén Fernández Gil and his family. Pepe Oriola, a former WTCC driver and 2021 TCR South America champion, was appointed as team manager.

=== 2024 ===
On February 26, 2024, the team confirmed it would enter a pair of Honda Civic Type R TCR (FL5) cars in the 2024 FIA TCR World Tour season, with WTCR win record holder Esteban Guerrieri – who returned to TCR after a season with Floyd Vanwall Racing Team in WEC – and former Hyundai junior Marco Butti later named as the drivers. In the team's first outing in round one at Vallelunga, both Guerrieri and Butti claimed podium finishes. Serbian driver Dušan Borković joined the team's World Tour programme on a full-time basis from the third round, having scored a podium in a one-off appearance at the second round in Marrakech.

On March 27, 2024, the team also confirmed it would enter the Honda Civic Type R TCR (FL5) in the 2024 TCR Europe season. Felipe Fernández Gil and series regular Dušan Borković were signed to compete with the team, with team principal Rubén Fernández Gil later confirmed to drive a third Honda. Santiago Concepción replaced Borković when the Serbian was announced to compete in TCR World Tour.

The team scored two TCR World Tour victories that year, with Guerrieri victorious in the first race at Interlagos and Borković taking his maiden win in the season finale in Macau while also leading the team's first podium lockout. Guerrieri entered the final round with a chance to win the title, but they vanished after an accident in the round's first race and he was effectively classified 4th overall. The team finished the 2024 season 3rd in the teams standings.

=== 2025 ===
The team remained in TCR World Tour for the 2025 season, but scaled back down to two cars. Esteban Guerrieri was retained, with Honda junior Ignacio Montenegro taking the second seat after finishing 3rd in TCR Europe in 2024. Other drivers, including Borković, Butti and Felipe Fernández Gil would make guest appearances during the season as well.

The team did not compete in the 2025 TCR Europe season as their operation was taken over by RC2 Racing Team, which is also owned by the Fernández family.

Guerrieri started the 2025 season by taking pole position and two victories in the opening round in Mexico and grabbing the early points lead.

== Racing results ==
(key)

=== TCR World Tour results ===
Year	Entrant	Car	No	Driver	1	2	3	4	5	6	7	8	9	10	11	12	13	14	15	16	17	18	19	20	Pos	Points	Team pos
2024	GOAT Racing	Honda Civic Type R TCR (FL5)	186	(Argentina) Esteban Guerrieri	ITA1; 3	ITA2; 8	MOR1; 9	MOR2; 2	USA1; 5^{5}	USA2; 3	BRA1; 1^{2}	BRA2; 4	URU1; 6	URU2; 3	CHN1; 2^{6}	CHN2; 5	MAC1; Ret^{6}	MAC2; 2							4th	291	3rd
2024	GOAT Racing	Honda Civic Type R TCR (FL5)	199	(Italy) Marco Butti	ITA1; 5	ITA2; 3	MOR1; Ret	MOR2; 7	USA1; 12	USA2; 10	BRA1; 3^{5}	BRA2; 6	URU1; Ret	URU2; 10	CHN1; 6	CHN2; 6	MAC1; Ret	MAC2; 3							9th	174	3rd
2024	GOAT Racing	Honda Civic Type R TCR (FL5)	41	(Spain) Víctor Fernández Gil	ITA1	ITA2	MOR1; 12	MOR2; 12	USA1	USA2	BRA1	BRA2	URU1	URU2	CHN1	CHN2	MAC1	MAC2							27th	8	3rd
2024	GOAT Racing	Honda Civic Type R TCR (FL5)	62	(Serbia) Dušan Borković	ITA1	ITA2	MOR1; Ret	MOR2; 3	USA1; 9	USA2; 7	BRA1; 9	BRA2; Ret	URU1; 11	URU2; 6	CHN1; 11	CHN2; 11	MAC1; 7	MAC2; 1							10th	134	3rd
2025	GOAT Racing	Honda Civic Type R TCR (FL5)	123	(Argentina) Ignacio Montenegro	MEX1; Ret^{4}	MEX2; 7	MEX3; 4	ESP1; Ret^{4}	ESP2; 6	ESP3; 8	ITA1; 4	ITA2; 5	PRT1; 9	PRT2; 3	AUS1	AUS2	AUS3	KOR1	KOR2	KOR3	CHN1	CHN2	MAC1	MAC2	9th*	144*	2nd*
2025	GOAT Racing	Honda Civic Type R TCR (FL5)	186	(Argentina) Esteban Guerrieri	MEX1; 4^{1}	MEX2; 1	MEX3; 1	ESP1; 8	ESP2; 5	ESP3; 4	ITA1; 5	ITA2; 7	PRT1; 3^{3}	PRT2; 6	AUS1	AUS2	AUS3	KOR1	KOR2	KOR3	CHN1	CHN2	MAC1	MAC2	2nd*	223*	2nd*
2025	GOAT Racing	Honda Civic Type R TCR (FL5)	11	(Italy) Marco Butti	MEX1	MEX2	MEX3	ESP1; Ret	ESP2; 12	ESP3; 15	ITA1; 11	ITA2; 8	PRT1; 13	PRT2; 15	AUS1	AUS2	AUS3	KOR1	KOR2	KOR3	CHN1	CHN2	MAC1	MAC2	16th*	27*	2nd*
2025	GOAT Racing	Honda Civic Type R TCR (FL5)	19	(Spain) Felipe Fernández Gil	MEX1	MEX2	MEX3	ESP1; 9	ESP2; 15	ESP3; 14	ITA1; 14	ITA2; 17	PRT1	PRT2	AUS1	AUS2	AUS3	KOR1	KOR2	KOR3	CHN1	CHN2	MAC1	MAC2	20th*	15*	2nd*
2025	GOAT Racing	Honda Civic Type R TCR (FL5)	62	(Serbia) Dušan Borković	MEX1	MEX2	MEX3	ESP1	ESP2	ESP3	ITA1	ITA2	PRT1; Ret	PRT2; 9	AUS1	AUS2	AUS3	KOR1	KOR2	KOR3	CHN1	CHN2	MAC1	MAC2	22nd*	10*	2nd*

* Season still in progress.

† – Drivers did not finish the race, but were classified as they completed over 75% of the race distance.

=== TCR Europe results ===
Year	Entrant	Car	No	Driver	1	2	3	4	5	6	7	8	9	10	11	12	Pos	Points
2024	GOAT Racing	Honda Civic Type R TCR (FL5)	11	(Spain) Rubén Fernández Gil	ITA1; 9	ITA2; Ret	BLG1; 8	BLG2; 8	AUT1; 8	AUT2; Ret	BLG3; Ret^{5}	BLG4; Ret	CZE1	CZE2	ESP1; 12	ESP2; 12	13th	80
2024	GOAT Racing	Honda Civic Type R TCR (FL5)	19	(Spain) Felipe Fernández Gil	ITA1; 6^{7}	ITA2; 3	BLG1; 9	BLG2; 4	AUT1; 7^{6}	AUT2; 9	BLG3; 3^{1}	BLG4; 5	CZE1; 9	CZE2; 7	ESP1; 6	ESP2; 9	5th	269
2024	GOAT Racing	Honda Civic Type R TCR (FL5)	33	(Spain) Santiago Concepcion	ITA1	ITA2	BLG1; 11	BLG2; 10	AUT1; 9^{4}	AUT2; 7	BLG3; 10^{7}	BLG4; 9	CZE1	CZE2	ESP1; 4^{4}	ESP2; 5	10th	135
2024	GOAT Racing	Honda Civic Type R TCR (FL5)	62	(Serbia) Dušan Borković	ITA1; 7^{6}	ITA2; 10	BLG1	BLG2	AUT1	AUT2	BLG3	BLG4	CZE1	CZE2	ESP1	ESP2	16th	29
