= Norbert Michelisz =

Hungarian racing driver (born 1984)

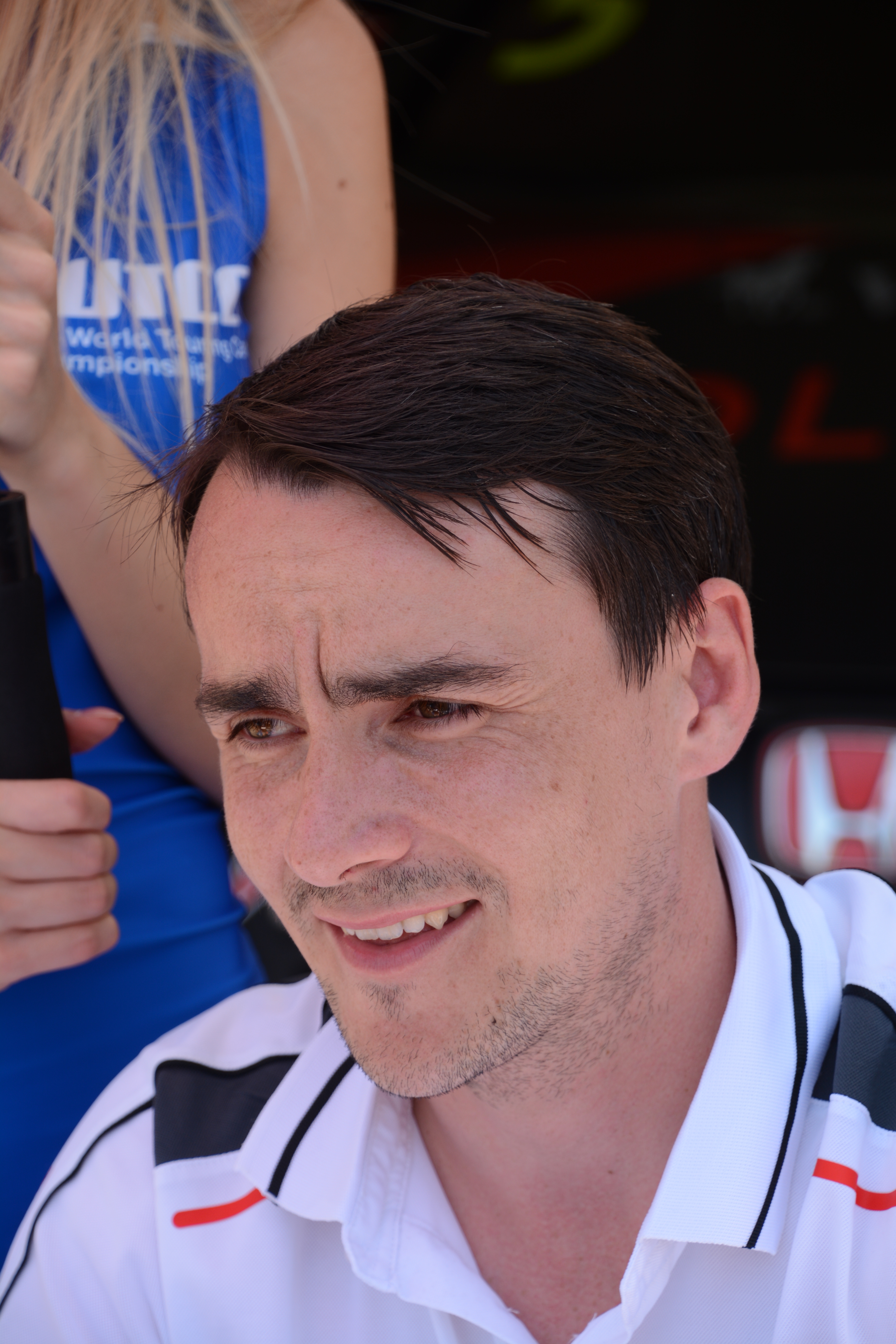
- Michelisz in 2015
- Nationality: (Hungary) Hungarian
- Born: 8 August 1984 (age 42) Himesháza, Hungarian People's Republic

World Touring Car Championship and World Touring Car Cup career
- Debut season: 2008
- Current team: BRC Racing Team
- Car number: 5
- Former teams: Sunred Engineering, Zengő Motorsport, JAS Motorsport
- Starts: 182
- Wins: 8
- Poles: 6
- Fastest laps: 7
- Best finish: 1st in 2019

Previous series
- 2012 2009 2008–09 2008–09 2007 2006: Superstars Series; SEAT León Supercopa; SEAT León Eurocup; Hungarian SEAT León Cup; Hungarian Renault Clio Cup; Hungarian Suzuki Swift Cup

Championship titles
- 2023-2024 2019 2012, 2015 2009 2009 2007 2006: TCR World Tour; World Touring Car Cup; WTCC Independents' Trophy; SEAT León Eurocup; Hungarian SEAT León Cup; Hungarian Renault Clio Cup; Hungarian Suzuki Swift Cup

Norbert Michelisz (born 8 August 1984) is a Hungarian auto racing driver. He was the 2019 winner of the World Touring Car Cup and winner of the TCR World Tour in 2023 and 2024.

== Career ==
=== Early career ===
Michelisz was the 2006 Hungarian Suzuki Swift Cup champion, and in 2007 he won the Hungarian Renault Clio Cup.

In 2008, Michelisz competed in the Hungarian SEAT León Supercup, where he finished as runner-up. He drove in the SEAT León Eurocup, winning one race at Monza, and finishing 14th overall. The win in the SEAT León Eurocup led to a drive in the FIA World Touring Car Championship, competing in two rounds at Okayama for the SEAT-backed SUNRED Engineering team. After retiring in race one, he finished sixteenth in the second race.

In 2009, Michelisz was the best scorer in the León Eurocup round at Porto, winning WTCC participation at Brands Hatch. He went on to win the León Eurocup title in September. This won him a drive for SEAT Sport in a SEAT León TDI at the 2009 European Touring Car Cup. He scored pole position and won the first race, but finished the second race in fifth, meaning he finished third in the overall standings, behind established touring car drivers James Thompson and Franz Engstler.

=== 2010-2017: World Touring Car Championship (WTCC) ===
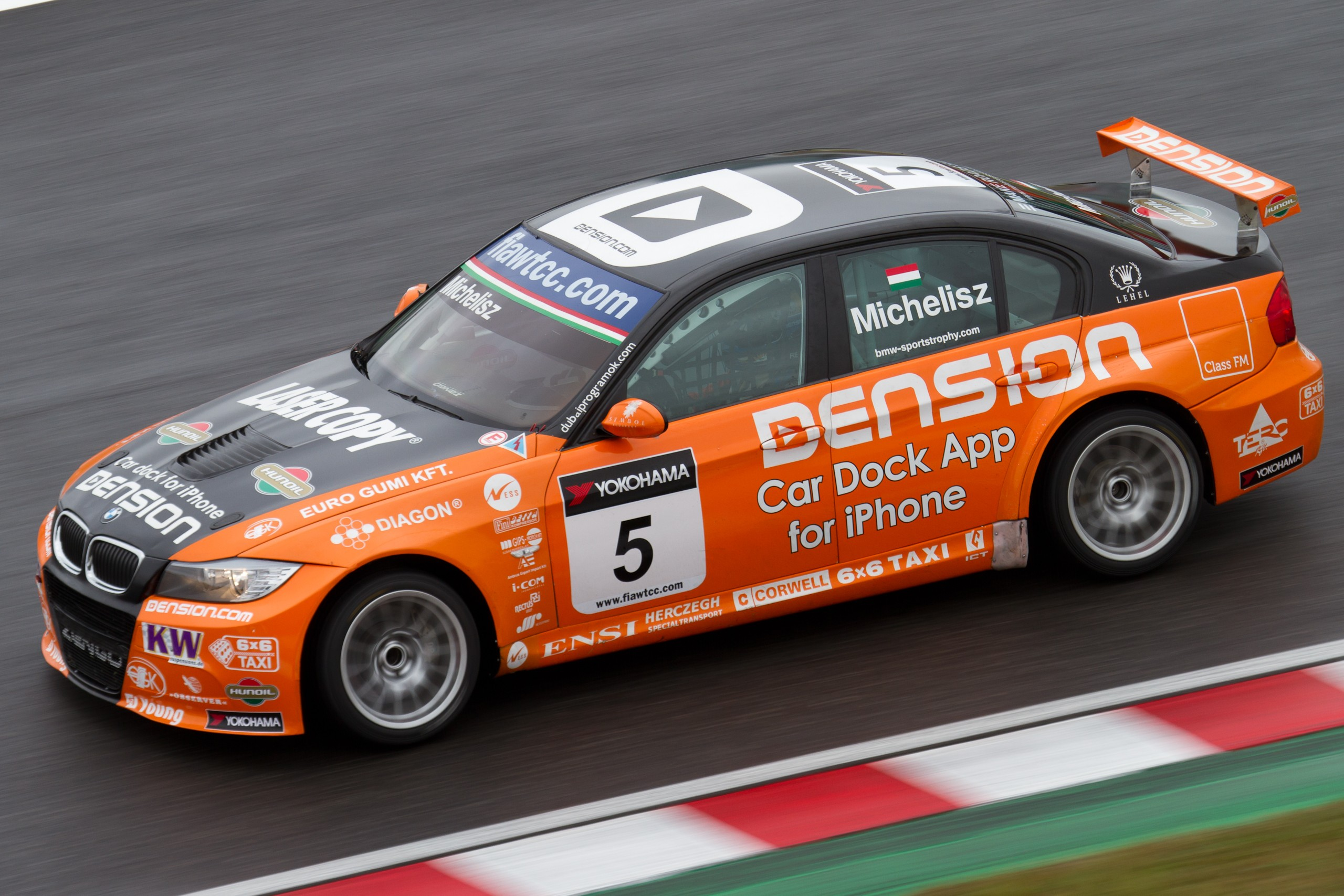
Michelisz competing in the 2011 World Touring Car Championship.

In 2010, Michelisz completed his first full season with SEAT León TDI in Zengő-Dension Team. He gained his first podium at Okayama in Race 1 after the disqualification of Andy Priaulx and Augusto Farfus. In the last race of the season, he won his maiden victory in WTCC at Macau. He finished ninth in the championship with 104 points. He won the Rookie Challenge that year.

In 2011, Michelisz switched to a BMW 320 TC with his Zengő-Dension Team. He scored his only podium finish in the season at Hungaroring. In both races, he posted the fastest lap. Overall, he was ninth again with 88 points.

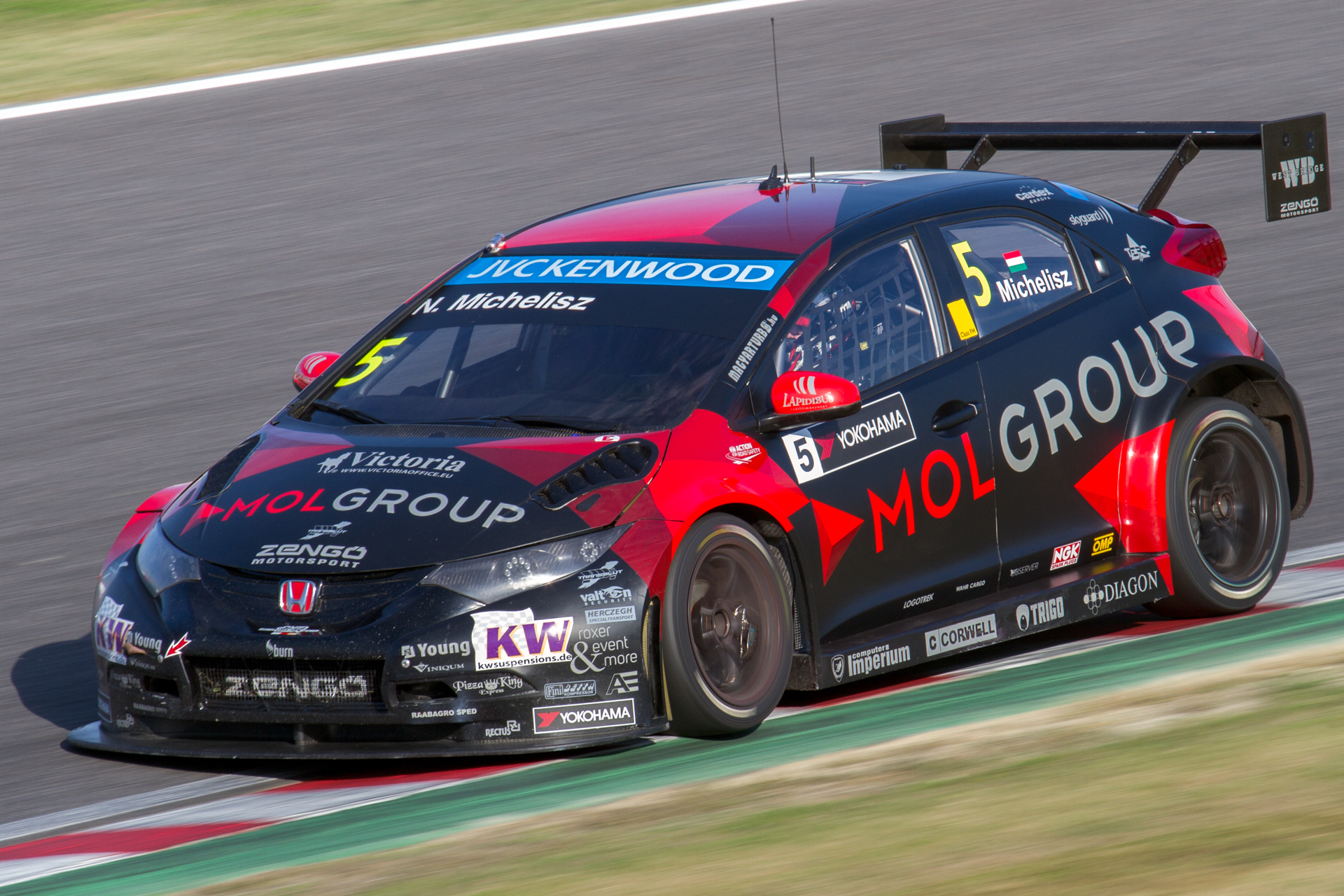
Michelisz competing in the 2014 World Touring Car Championship

In 2012, Michelisz took his first win since the Race of Macau in 2010, and his first win with the BMW. He was victorious in Race 2 of the Race of Hungary, in front of his home crowd.

On 18 November 2012, after the last race (Macau), Michelisz won the Yokohama Trophy (Independent Championship) with the Zengő Motorsport team, achieving the most significant victory in the history of Hungarian motor racing.

Zengő Motorsport switched to Honda for 2013, Michelisz stayed with the Hungarian squad until the end of 2015 – he won twice during this time: in 2013, he took victory at Honda's home track, Suzuka Circuit, two years later, he was a winner again at the Hungaroring.

On 13 January 2016, Honda announced Michelisz as factory driver alongside Rob Huff and Tiago Monteiro. The Himesháza-born driver was victorious in Japan for the second time; then he finished fourth in the standings. Next year, he became a championship protagonist, but got defeated by Cyan Racing's Thed Björk in a dramatic final weekend in Qatar.

=== 2018- : World Touring Car Cup ===
After the 2017 season, WTCC became World Touring Car Cup following the merge with TCR International Series. On 30 January 2018, it was announced that Michelisz would join to BRC Racing Team's Hyundai team as Gabriele Tarquini's team-mate. His only win of the year was clinched at Slovakia Ring, he was fourth in the championship while helping Tarquini to become the first WTCR champion.

In 2019, Michelisz continued his career with BRC and Hyundai. After a couple of races, he became a real challenger by taking five wins and ten podium finishes during the season. In a thrilling final at Sepang, he was crowned as champion after defeating Münnich Motorsport's and Honda's Esteban Guerrieri.

== Racing record ==
=== Complete World Touring Car Championship results ===
(key) (Races in bold indicate pole position) (Races in italics indicate fastest lap)

Year	Team	Car	1	2	3	4	5	6	7	8	9	10	11	12	13	14	15	16	17	18	19	20	21	22	23	24	DC	Points
2008	SUNRED Racing Development	SEAT León TFSI	BRA; 1	BRA; 2	MEX; 1	MEX; 2	ESP; 1	ESP; 2	FRA; 1	FRA; 2	CZE; 1	CZE; 2	POR; 1	POR; 2	GBR; 1	GBR; 2	GER; 1	GER; 2	EUR; 1	EUR; 2	ITA; 1	ITA; 2	JPN; 1 Ret	JPN; 2; 16	MAC; 1	MAC; 2	NC	0
2009	SUNRED Engineering	SEAT León 2.0 TFSI	BRA; 1	BRA; 2	MEX; 1	MEX; 2	MAR; 1	MAR; 2	FRA; 1	FRA; 2	ESP; 1	ESP; 2	CZE; 1	CZE; 2	POR; 1	POR; 2	GBR; 1 Ret	GBR; 2 NC	GER; 1	GER; 2	ITA; 1	ITA; 2	JPN; 1	JPN; 2	MAC; 1	MAC; 2	NC	0
2010	Zengő-Dension Team	SEAT León TDI	BRA; 1; 10	BRA; 2; 9	MAR; 1; 7	MAR; 2; 10	ITA; 1; 19	ITA; 2; 8	BEL; 1; 6	BEL; 2; 7	POR; 1; 7	POR; 2 Ret	GBR; 1; 9	GBR; 2; 7	CZE; 1 Ret	CZE; 2; 14	GER; 1; 8	**GER**; **2**; 11	ESP; 1; 11	ESP; 2; 12	JPN; 1; 3	JPN; 2; 7	MAC; 1; 5	MAC; 2; 1			9th	104
2011	Zengő-Dension Team	BMW 320 TC	BRA; 1	BRA; 2	BEL; 1; 7	BEL; 2; 8	ITA; 1; 4	ITA; 2; 7	HUN; 1; 2	HUN; 2; 15	CZE; 1; 8	CZE; 2; 15	POR; 1; 8	POR; 2; 4	GBR; 1 NC	GBR; 2; 12	GER; 1; 15	GER; 2 Ret	ESP; 1; 7	ESP; 2; 6	JPN; 1; 15	JPN; 2; 9	CHN; 1; 11	CHN; 2 Ret	MAC; 1; 8	MAC; 2; 9	9th	88
2012	Zengő Motorsport	BMW 320 TC	ITA; 1; 9	**ITA**; **2**; 8	ESP; 1; 7	ESP; 2; 4	MAR; 1; 9	MAR; 2 Ret	**SVK**; **1**; 6	SVK; 2; 6	HUN; 1; 7	HUN; 2; 1	AUT; 1; 9	AUT; 2; 5	POR; 1; 4	POR; 2; 10	BRA; 1; 9	**BRA**; **2**; 5	USA; 1; 3	USA; 2; 2	JPN; 1; 13	JPN; 2 Ret	CHN; 1; 15	CHN; 2; 24	MAC; 1 NC	MAC; 2; 21†	6th	155
2013	Zengő Motorsport	Honda Civic WTCC	ITA; 1; 8	ITA; 2; 22	MAR; 1 Ret	MAR; 2; 15†	SVK; 1; 3	SVK; 2; 21	HUN; 1; 2	HUN; 2; 8	AUT; 1; 14	AUT; 2; 3	RUS; 1; 3	RUS; 2; 5	POR; 1 Ret	POR; 2 DNS	ARG; 1; 7	ARG; 2; 5	USA; 1; 20	USA; 2; 3	**JPN**; **1**; 1	JPN; 2 Ret	CHN; 1; 10	CHN; 2; 3	MAC; 1; 4	MAC; 2 Ret	6th	185
2014	Zengő Motorsport	Honda Civic WTCC	MAR; 1; 9	MAR; 2 DNS	FRA; 1; 7	FRA; 2; 8	HUN; 1; 6	HUN; 2; 10	SVK; 1; 3	SVK; 2 C	AUT; 1; 9	AUT; 2; 4	RUS; 1; 9	RUS; 2; 7	BEL; 1; 7	BEL; 2; 7	ARG; 1; 2	ARG; 2; 7	BEI; 1; 6	BEI; 2; 5	CHN; 1; 5	CHN; 2; 4	JPN; 1; 4	JPN; 2; 3	MAC; 1; 2	MAC; 2; 4	4th	201
2015	Zengő Motorsport	Honda Civic WTCC	ARG; 1; 6	ARG; 2; 7	MAR; 1; 8	MAR; 2; 11	HUN; 1; 8	**HUN**; **2**; 1	GER; 1; 4	GER; 2 Ret	RUS; 1; 7	RUS; 2; 3	SVK; 1 Ret	SVK; 2; 8	FRA; 1; 6	FRA; 2; 2	POR; 1; 3	POR; 2; 4	**JPN**; **1**; 2	JPN; 2; 14†	CHN; 1; 6	CHN; 2; 11	THA; 1 Ret	**THA**; **2**; 12	QAT; 1; 7	QAT; 2; 3	6th	193
2016	Honda Racing Team JAS	Honda Civic WTCC	FRA; 1; 3	FRA; 2; 3	SVK; 1; 6	SVK; 2; 4	HUN; 1 DNS	HUN; 2; 10	MAR; 1 DSQ	MAR; 2 DSQ	GER; 1; 3	GER; 2; 2	RUS; 1; 10	RUS; 2; 3	POR; 1; 8	POR; 2; 3	ARG; 1; 6	ARG; 2; 8	**JPN**; **1**; 1	JPN; 2; 8	CHN; 1; 2	CHN; 2; 11	QAT; 1; 5	QAT; 2; 4			4th	213
2017	Castrol Honda World Touring Car Team	Honda Civic WTCC	MAR; 1; 5	MAR; 2; 2	ITA; 1 NC	ITA; 2; 6	HUN; 1 NC	HUN; 2; 4	GER; 1; 7	**GER**; **2**; 2	POR; 1; 7	**POR**; **2**; 1	ARG; 1; 14	ARG; 2; 1	CHN; 1 DSQ	CHN; 2 DSQ	JPN; 1; 7	**JPN**; **2**; 1	MAC; 1; 5	MAC; 2; 2	QAT; 1; 9	QAT; 2; 8					2nd	255

^{†} Driver did not finish the race, but was classified as he completed over 90% of the race distance.

=== Complete World Touring Car Cup results ===
(key) (Races in bold indicate pole position) (Races in italics indicate fastest lap)

Year	Team	Car	1	2	3	4	5	6	7	8	9	10	11	12	13	14	15	16	17	18	19	20	21	22	23	24	25	26	27	28	29	30	DC	Points
2018	BRC Racing Team	Hyundai i30 N TCR	MAR; 1 Ret	MAR; 2; 7	MAR; 3; 5	**HUN**; **1**; 3	HUN; 2; 6	**HUN**; **3**; 2	GER; 1; 4	GER; 2; 5	GER; 3 Ret	NED; 1 Ret	NED; 2; 23	NED; 3; 22†	POR; 1 Ret	POR; 2; 5	POR; 3; 3	SVK; 1; 23†	SVK; 2; 6	**SVK**; **3**; 1	CHN; 1 Ret	CHN; 2; 11	CHN; 3; 5	WUH; 1 Ret	WUH; 2; 14	WUH; 3; 14	JPN; 1; 11	JPN; 2; 3	JPN; 3; 9	MAC; 1; 5	MAC; 2 Ret	MAC; 3; 3	4th	246
2019	BRC Hyundai N Squadra Corse	Hyundai i30 N TCR	MAR; 1; 11	MAR; 2; 12	MAR; 3; 8	HUN; 1; 10	HUN; 2 Ret	**HUN**; **3**; 2	SVK; 1; 3	SVK; 2; 6	SVK; 3; 2	NED; 1 Ret	NED; 2; 8	NED; 3; 3	GER; 1; 1	GER; 2; 7	GER; 3 Ret	**POR**; **1**; 1	POR; 2 Ret	POR; 3; 9	CHN; 1; 4	CHN; 2; 1	CHN; 3 Ret	JPN; 1; 13	JPN; 2; 1	JPN; 3; 8	MAC; 1; 2	MAC; 2; 10	MAC; 3; 12	**MAL**; **1**; 1	MAL; 2; 8	**MAL**; **3**; 4	1st	372
2020	BRC Hyundai N LUKOIL Squadra Corse	Hyundai i30 N TCR	BEL; 1; 11	BEL; 2; 8	GER; 1 DNP	GER; 2 DNP	SVK; 1; 10	SVK; 2; 6	SVK; 3; 10	HUN; 1; 21	HUN; 2; 5	HUN; 3; 10	**ESP**; **1**; 6	ESP; 2; 15	ESP; 3; 16	ARA; 1; 16	ARA; 2; 5	ARA; 3; 7															13th	93
2021	BRC Hyundai N Lukoil Squadra Corse	Hyundai Elantra N TCR	GER; 1; 5	GER; 2 Ret	POR; 1 Ret	POR; 2; 3	ESP; 1; 7	ESP; 2 NC	HUN; 1; 6	HUN; 2; 14	CZE; 1; 15	CZE; 2; 1	FRA; 1; 7	FRA; 2; 6	ITA; 1; 4	ITA; 2; 9	RUS; 1; 12	RUS; 2; 8															8th	146
2022	BRC Hyundai N Squadra Corse	Hyundai Elantra N TCR	FRA; 1; 9	FRA; 2 Ret	GER; 1 C	GER; 2 C	HUN; 1; 12	HUN; 2; 4	ESP; 1; 6	ESP; 2 Ret	POR; 1; 4	POR; 2; 5	ITA; 1; 4	ITA; 2; 4	ALS; 1; 4	ALS; 2; 4	BHR; 1; 2	BHR; 2; 1	SAU; 1; 2	SAU; 2; 4													4th	222

^{†} Driver did not finish the race, but was classified as he completed over 90% of the race distance.

=== Complete TCR World Tour results ===
(key) (Races in bold indicate pole position) (Races in italics indicate fastest lap)

Year	Team	Car	1	2	3	4	5	6	7	8	9	10	11	12	13	14	15	16	17	18	19	20	21	DC	Points
2023	BRC Hyundai N Squadra Corse	Hyundai Elantra N TCR	**ALG**; **1**; 1	ALG; 2; 8	SPA; 1; 8	SPA; 2; 2	**VAL**; **1**; 1	VAL; 2; 4	HUN; 1; 6	HUN; 2; 19	ELP; 1; 6	ELP; 2; 7	VIL; 1; 2	VIL; 2; 4	SYD; 1; 8	SYD; 2; 4	SYD; 3; 2	BAT; 1; 10	BAT; 2; 1	BAT; 3; 5	**MAC**; **1**; 1	MAC; 2; 8		1st	440
2024	BRC Hyundai N Squadra Corse	Hyundai Elantra N TCR	**VAL**; **1**; 1^{1}	VAL; 2; 6	MRK; 1; 3^{3}	MRK; 2; 11	MOH; 1; 2^{2}	MOH; 2; 5	SAP; 1; 6	SAP; 2; 1	ELP; 1; 4^{3}	ELP; 2; 4	ZHZ; 1; 7^{5}	ZHZ; 2; 8	MAC; 1; 2^{4}	MAC; 2; 5								1st	323
2025	BRC Hyundai N Squadra Corse	Hyundai Elantra N TCR	AHR; 1; 18	AHR; 2; 16	AHR; 3; 12	CRT; 1; 4	CRT; 2; 11	CRT; 3; 5	**MNZ**; **1**; 1^{1}	MNZ; 2; 4	CVR; 1; 5	CVR; 2; 13	BEN; 1 C	BEN; 2; 1	BEN; 3; 9	INJ; 1; 10	INJ; 2; 8	INJ; 3; 9	ZHZ; 1; 3	ZHZ; 2; 12	ZHZ; 3; 8	MAC; 1 Ret	MAC; 2; 8	8th	290
2026	BRC Hyundai N Squadra Corse	Hyundai Elantra N EV TCR	MIS; 1; 1	MIS; 2 Ret	CRT; 1; 4	CRT; 2; 3	CRT; 3; 4	LEC; 1; 3	LEC; 2; 7	CVR; 1; 5	CVR; 2; 1	INJ; 1; 3	INJ; 2; 6	INJ; 3; 3	CHE; 1; 5	CHE; 2; 5	CHE; 3; 8	**ZHZ**; **1**; 2	ZHZ; 2; 2	ZHZ; 3; 2	MAC; 1	MAC; 2		2nd*	412*

^{*} Season still in progress.

=== Complete International Superstars Series results ===
(key) (Races in bold indicate pole position) (Races in italics indicate fastest lap)

Year	Team	Car	1	2	3	4	5	6	7	8	9	10	11	12	13	14	15	16	DC	Points
2012	Scuderia Giudici	BMW M3 (E92)	MNZ; 1	MNZ; 2	IMO; 1	IMO; 2	DON; 1	DON; 2	MUG; 1	MUG; 2	HUN; 1; 3	HUN; 2 Ret	SPA; 1	SPA; 2	VAL; 1	VAL; 2	PER; 1	PER; 2	25th	14

=== Complete TCR International Series results ===
(key) (Races in bold indicate pole position) (Races in italics indicate fastest lap)

Year	Team	Car	1	2	3	4	5	6	7	8	9	10	11	12	13	14	15	16	17	18	19	20	DC	Points
2017	M1RA	Honda Civic Type R TCR	RIM; 1	RIM; 2	BHR; 1	BHR; 2	SPA; 1	SPA; 2	MNZ; 1	MNZ; 2	SAL; 1	SAL; 2	**HUN**; **1**; 2	HUN; 2; 6	OSC; 1	OSC; 2	CHA; 1; 1	CHA; 2; 22†	ZHE; 1	ZHE; 2	DUB; 1	DUB; 2	14th	59

^{†} Driver did not finish the race, but was classified as he completed over 75% of the race distance.

=== Complete TCR Europe Touring Car Series results ===
(key) (Races in bold indicate pole position) (Races in italics indicate fastest lap)

Year	Team	Car	1	2	3	4	5	6	7	8	9	10	11	12	13	14	DC	Points
2018	M1RA	Hyundai i30 N TCR	LEC; 1	LEC; 2	ZAN; 1	ZAN; 2	SPA; 1	SPA; 2	HUN; 1	HUN; 2	ASS; 1	ASS; 2	MNZ; 1	MNZ; 2	CAT; 1; 3^{5}	CAT; 2; 4	16th	28
2023	BRC Hyundai N Squadra Corse	Hyundai Elantra N TCR	ALG; 1; 1	ALG; 2; 8	PAU; 1	PAU; 2	SPA; 1; 8	SPA; 2; 2	HUN; 1; 6	HUN; 2; 19	LEC; 1	LEC; 2	MNZ; 1	MNZ; 2	CAT; 1	CAT; 2	NC‡	0‡

^{‡} Driver was a World Tour full-time entry and was ineligible for points.

Sporting positions
Preceded by Oscar Nogués	SEAT León Eurocup; Champion; 2009	Succeeded by Gábor Wéber
Preceded by Kristian Poulsen	World Touring Car Championship; Independents' Trophy winner 2012	Succeeded by James Nash
Preceded by Franz Engstler	World Touring Car Championship; Independents' Trophy winner 2015	Succeeded by Mehdi Bennani
Preceded by Gabriele Tarquini	World Touring Car Cup; Champion; 2019	Succeeded by Yann Ehrlacher
Preceded by Mikel Azcona (World Touring Car Cup)	TCR World Tour; Champion; 2023-2024	Succeeded by Yann Ehrlacher
