= TCR World Tour =

International touring car series

- Category: Touring cars
- Country: International
- Inaugural season: 2023
- Tyre suppliers: K Kumho
- Drivers' champion: (France) Yann Ehrlacher
- Teams' champion: (Sweden) Cyan Racing Lynk & Co
- Official website: fiatcrworldtour.com

The FIA TCR World Tour is an international touring car racing series for TCR cars. It was formed for 2023 to effectively replace the WTCR series, and received FIA status for its second season in 2024. A season consists of several rounds selected from various regional and national TCR series, where a group of full-season drivers and teams compete against local entries, with both able to score points for the TCR World Tour standings.

The inaugural 2023 season was composed of nine events selected from a number of TCR series worldwide, and was promoted by former World Touring Car Championship manager Marcello Lotti's WSC Group.

== History ==
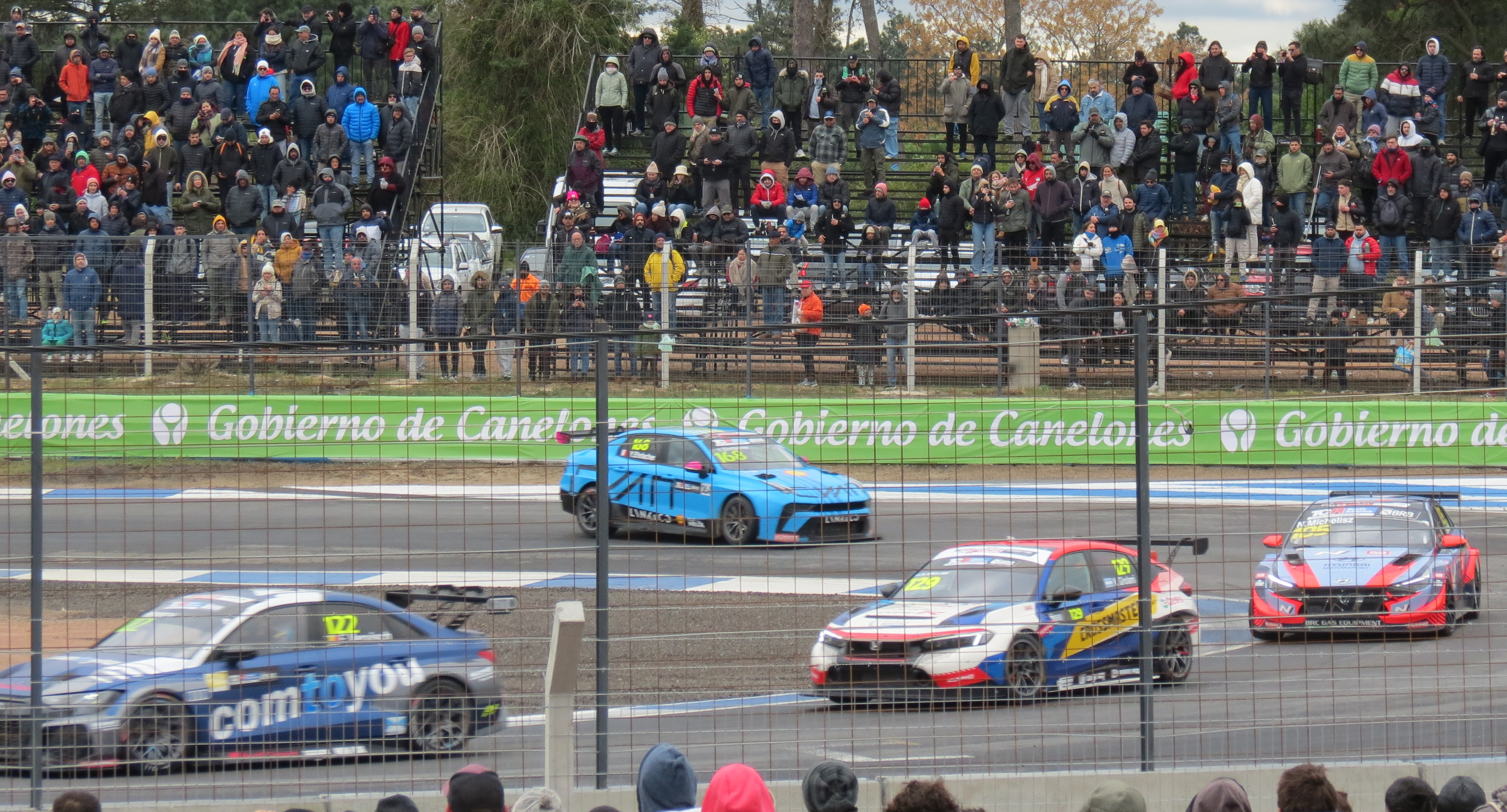
TCR World Tour action in El Pinar, Uruguay in 2023

On 14 October 2022, it was reported that the World Touring Car Cup would be folding in that format following the 2022 season due to numerous logistical difficulties caused by COVID-19 pandemic. On the same day, WSC announced the formation of the TCR World Tour. It was launched in order to replace the WTCR. On 12 November 2022, it was announced that Mount Panorama Circuit would feature on the calendar as part of the TCR Australia Touring Car Series. On 30 November 2022, it was confirmed that Algarve International Circuit, Circuit de Spa-Francorchamps and Hungaroring would feature on the calendar as part of the TCR Europe Touring Car Series. On 13 January 2023, it was confirmed that Vallelunga Circuit would feature on the calendar as part of the Italian Superturismo Championship. On 8 February 2023, it was announced that Autódromo Víctor Borrat Fabini and Autódromo José Carlos Bassi would feature on the calendar as part of the 2023 TCR South America Touring Car Championship, while Guia Circuit would feature as part of the 2023 TCR China Touring Car Championship.

== Season results ==
Kumho TCR World Tour
| Year | Winning driver / Team (car) | | 2nd / Team (car) | | 3rd / Team (car) | | Winning team / Car | |
|---|---|---|---|---|---|---|---|---|
| 2023 | (Hungary) Norbert Michelisz | BRC Racing Team (Hyundai i30 N TCR) | (France) Yann Ehrlacher | Cyan Racing Lynk & Co (Lynk & Co 03 FL TCR) | (United Kingdom) Robert Huff | Audi Sport Team Comtoyou (Audi RS 3 LMS TCR (2021)) | (Sweden) Cyan Racing Lynk & Co | Lynk & Co 03 FL TCR |
| 2024 | (Hungary) Norbert Michelisz | BRC Racing Team (Hyundai i30 N TCR) | (Sweden) Thed Björk | Cyan Racing Lynk & Co (Lynk & Co 03 FL TCR) | (Spain) Mikel Azcona | BRC Racing Team (Hyundai i30 N TCR) | (Sweden) Cyan Racing Lynk & Co | Lynk & Co 03 FL TCR |
| 2025 | (France) Yann Ehrlacher | Cyan Racing Lynk & Co (Lynk & Co 03 FL TCR) | (Sweden) Thed Björk | Cyan Racing Lynk & Co (Lynk & Co 03 FL TCR) | (Argentina) Esteban Guerrieri | GOAT Racing (Honda Civic Type R TCR (FL5)) | (Sweden) Cyan Racing Lynk & Co | Lynk & Co 03 FL TCR |

== Event winners ==
Drivers
| | Driver | Total |
|---|---|---|
| 1 | (Hungary) Norbert Michelisz | 6 |
| 1 | (France) Yann Ehrlacher | 6 |
| 3 | (Uruguay) Santiago Urrutia | 3 |
| 3 | (Sweden) Thed Björk | 3 |
| 3 | (China) Ma Qing Hua | 3 |
| 6 | (Australia) Will Brown | 2 |
| 6 | (United Kingdom) Robert Huff | 2 |
| 6 | (Argentina) Néstor Girolami | 2 |
| 6 | (Spain) Mikel Azcona | 2 |
| 10 | (France) John Filippi | 1 |
| 10 | (Belgium) Frédéric Vervisch | 1 |
| 10 | (Argentina) Esteban Guerrieri | 1 |

Teams
| | Team | Total |
|---|---|---|
| 1 | (Sweden) Cyan Racing | 15 |
| 2 | (Italy) BRC Racing Team | 9 |
| 3 | (Belgium) Comtoyou Racing | 2 |
| 3 | (Australia) MPC – Team Liqui Moly | 2 |
| 3 | (Belgium) Audi Sport Team Comtoyou | 2 |
| 6 | (Argentina) Squadra Martino Racing | 1 |
| 6 | (Spain) GOAT Racing | 1 |

Cars
| | Car | Total |
|---|---|---|
| 1 | Lynk & Co 03 FL TCR | 15 |
| 2 | Hyundai Elantra N TCR | 9 |
| 3 | Audi RS 3 LMS TCR | 6 |
| 4 | Honda Civic Type R TCR (FL5) | 2 |

== Circuits ==
The championship consists of circuits from TCR Europe Touring Car Series, TCR Italy Touring Car Championship, TCR South America Touring Car Championship, TCR Australia Touring Car Series, and TCR China Touring Car Championship:

- **Bold** denotes a circuit will be used in the 2026 season.

| Number | Circuits | Rounds | Years |
|---|---|---|---|
| 1 | (Macau) **Guia Circuit** | 4 | 2023–present |
| 2 | (Italy) Vallelunga Circuit | 2 | 2023–2024 |
| 2 | (Uruguay) Autódromo Víctor Borrat Fabini | 2 | 2023–2024 |
| 2 | (China) Hunan International Circuit | 2 | 2024–2025 |
| 2 | (Spain) **Circuit Ricardo Tormo** | 2 | 2025–present |
| 2 | (Portugal) **Circuito Internacional de Vila Real** | 2 | 2025–present |
| 2 | (South Korea) **Inje Speedium** | 2 | 2025–present |
| 8 | (Portugal) Algarve International Circuit | 1 | 2023 |
| 8 | (Belgium) Circuit de Spa-Francorchamps | 1 | 2023 |
| 8 | (Hungary) Hungaroring | 1 | 2023 |
| 8 | (Argentina) Autódromo José Carlos Bassi | 1 | 2023 |
| 8 | (Australia) Sydney Motorsport Park | 1 | 2023 |
| 8 | (Australia) Mount Panorama Circuit | 1 | 2023 |
| 8 | (Morocco) Circuit International Automobile Moulay El Hassan | 1 | 2024 |
| 8 | (United States) Mid-Ohio Sports Car Course | 1 | 2024 |
| 8 | (Brazil) Interlagos Circuit | 1 | 2024 |
| 8 | (Mexico) Autódromo Hermanos Rodríguez | 1 | 2025 |
| 8 | (Italy) Monza Circuit | 1 | 2025 |
| 8 | (Australia) The Bend Motorsport Park | 1 | 2025 |
| 8 | (Italy) **Misano World Circuit** | 1 | 2026 |
| 8 | (France) **Circuit Paul Ricard** | 1 | 2026 |
| 8 | (China) **Chengdu Tianfu International Circuit** | 1 | 2026 |
| 8 | (China) **Zhejiang International Circuit** | 1 | 2026 |

== See also ==
- TCR Model of the Year
- World Touring Car Championship
- World Touring Car Cup
- TCR International Series
