= Hunan International Circuit =

Motorsport circuit in Zhuzhou, China

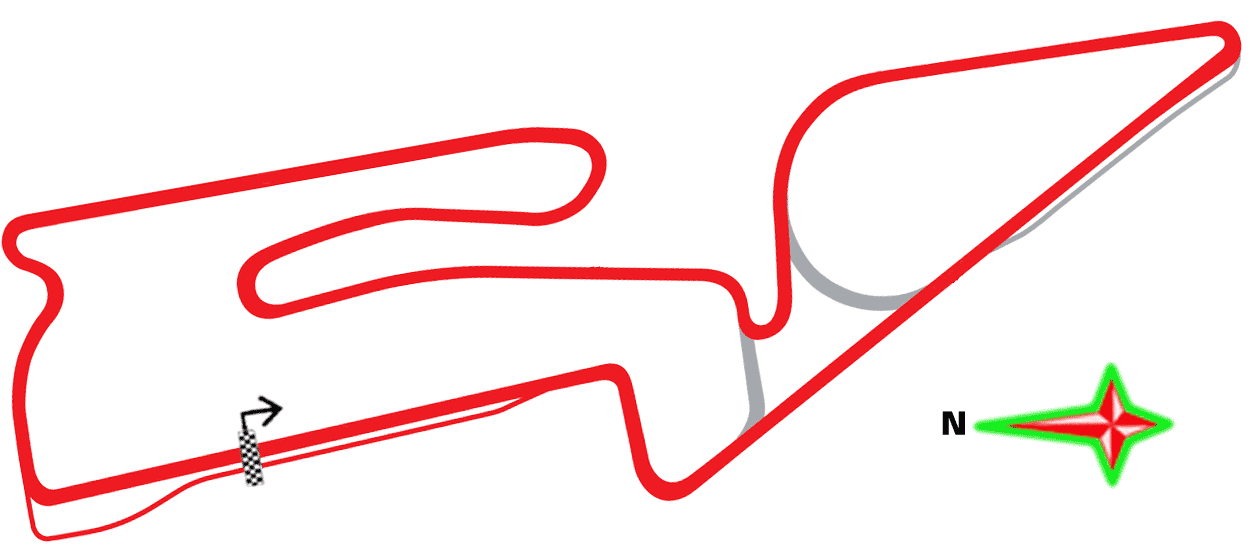
- Full Circuit (2019–present)
- Location: Zhuzhou, Hunan, China
- Coordinates: 27°49′56.94″N 113°03′15.36″E
- FIA Grade: 2
- Broke ground: March 2018; 8 years ago
- Opened: October 2019; 7 years ago
- Architect: Yao Qiming
- Former names: Zhuzhou International Circuit (October 2017–October 2025)
- Major events: Current: F4 China (2026); Former: TCR World Tour (2024–2025); TCR Asia (2021–2022, 2025); TCR China (2019–2021, 2023–2025); F4 SEA (2023); Porsche Carrera Cup Asia (2021–2022)

Full Circuit (2019–present)
- Surface: Asphalt
- Length: 3.774 km (2.345 mi)
- Turns: 14
- Race lap record: 1:36.839 ( (China) Yu Kuai, Porsche 911 (991 II) GT3 Cup, 2021, Carrera Cup)

The Hunan International Circuit; formerly the Zhuzhou International Circuit is a 3.774 km (2.345 mi) FIA Grade 2 motorsport circuit in Zhuzhou, Hunan, China. The circuit was built between March 2018 and October 2019, and was designed by Yaq Qiming. On 2 November 2025, the circuit's name was officially changed as Hunan International Circuit.

== Event list ==
Current

- September: F4 Chinese Championship
- November: China Touring Car Championship

Former

- Formula 4 South East Asia Championship (2023)
- Formula Renault Super Challenge (2022)
- Porsche Carrera Cup Asia (2021–2022)
- TCR Asia Series (2021–2022, 2025)
- TCR China Touring Car Championship (2019–2021, 2023–2025)
- TCR World Tour (2024–2025)

== Lap records ==
As of September 2026, the fastest official race lap records at the Hunan International Circuit are listed as:

Category	Time	Driver	Vehicle	Event
Full Circuit (2019–present): 3.774 km (2.345 mi)
Porsche Carrera Cup	1:36.839	Yu Kuai	Porsche 911 (991 II) GT3 Cup	2021 Zhuzhou Porsche Carrera Cup Asia round
Formula Renault 2.0	1:39.657	Gerrard Xie	Tatuus FR2.0/13	2022 3rd Zhuzhou Formula Renault Super Challenge round
Formula 4	1:40.113	Chan Yu Tsai	Mygale M21-F4	2026 Zhuzhou F4 Chinese round
CTCC	1:43.914	Jiang Tengyi	Volkswagen Lamando CTCC	2021 2nd Zhuzhou TCR China round
TCR Touring Car	1:44.056	Jason Zhang	Lynk & Co 03 TCR	2024 1st Zhuzhou TCR China round
GT4	1:44.411	Lo Ka Chun	Ginetta G55 GT4	2024 1st Zhuzhou Greater Bay Area GT Cup round
Roadsport	1:55.593	Chung Ho Hin Jactin	Toyota GR86	2024 1st Zhuzhou Macau Roadsport Challenge round
