= Hyundai Elantra N TCR =

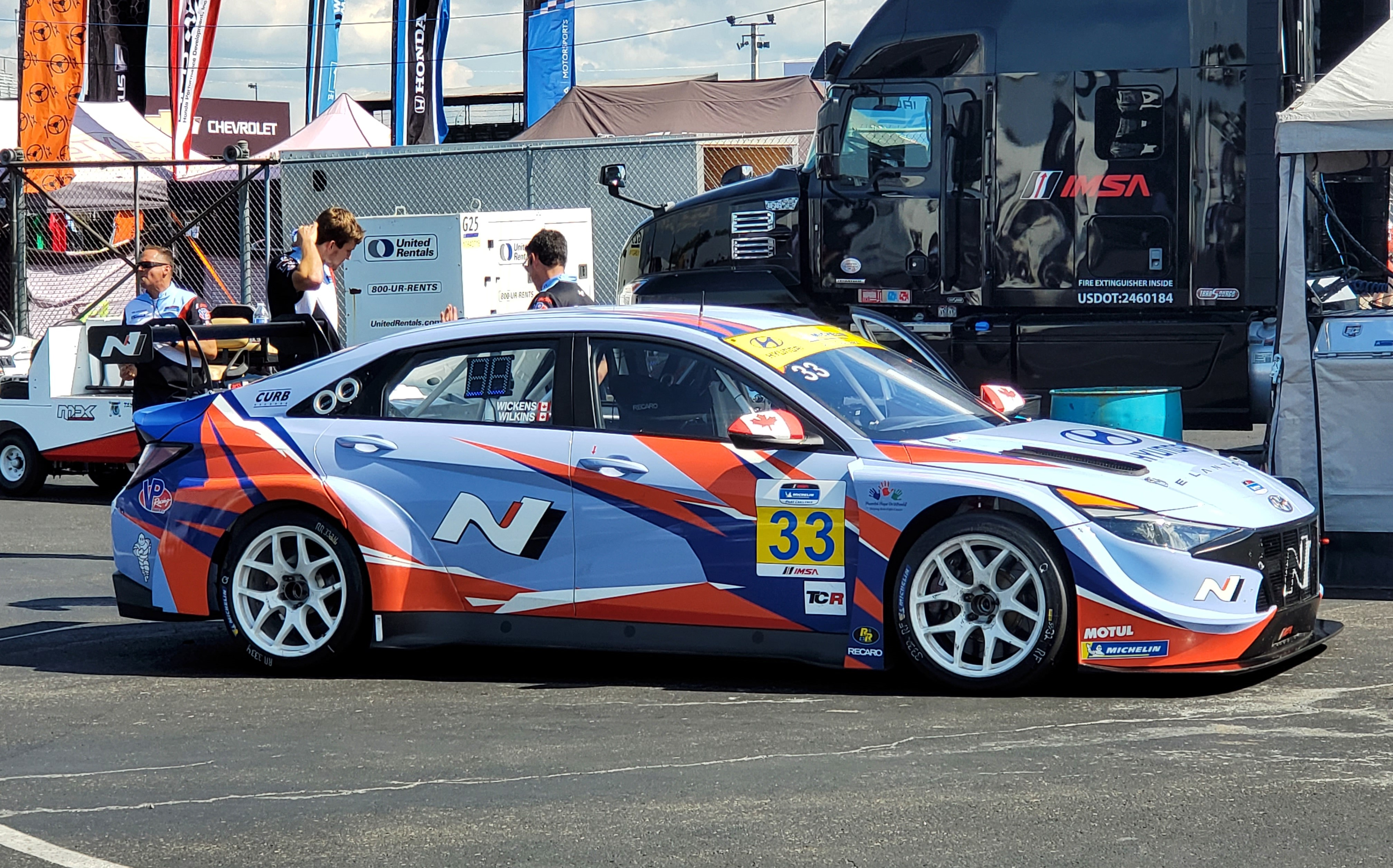
- The No. 33 Elantra N TCR of Bryan Herta Autosport with Curb-Agajanian in the paddock at Watkins Glen International in 2022.
- Category: TCR Touring Car
- Constructor: Hyundai Motorsport
- Predecessor: Hyundai i30 N TCR

Technical specifications
- Chassis: Hyundai Elantra, Hyundai Motorsport designed, lightweight high-tensile steel roll cage, steel and composite fibre panels
- Suspension (front): MacPherson struts with adjustable dampers
- Suspension (rear): Four-arm multi-link with adjustable dampers
- Length: 4,710 mm (185.4 in)
- Width: 1,950 mm (76.8 in)
- Axle track: 1,780 mm (70.1 in)
- Wheelbase: 2,750 mm (108.3 in)
- Engine: Theta II (G4KH) 1,998 cc (121.9 cu in) I4 turbocharged front-mounted, FWD
- Torque: 450 N⋅m (332 lb⋅ft)
- Transmission: Xtrac 6-speed Sequential
- Power: 350 hp (261 kW; 355 PS)
- Weight: 1,265 kg (2,789 lb)
- Brakes: Front: 380 mm ventilated brake discs with six-piston calipers Rear: 278 mm brake discs with two-piston calipers

Competition history
- Debut: 2021 BMW Endurance Challenge at Daytona

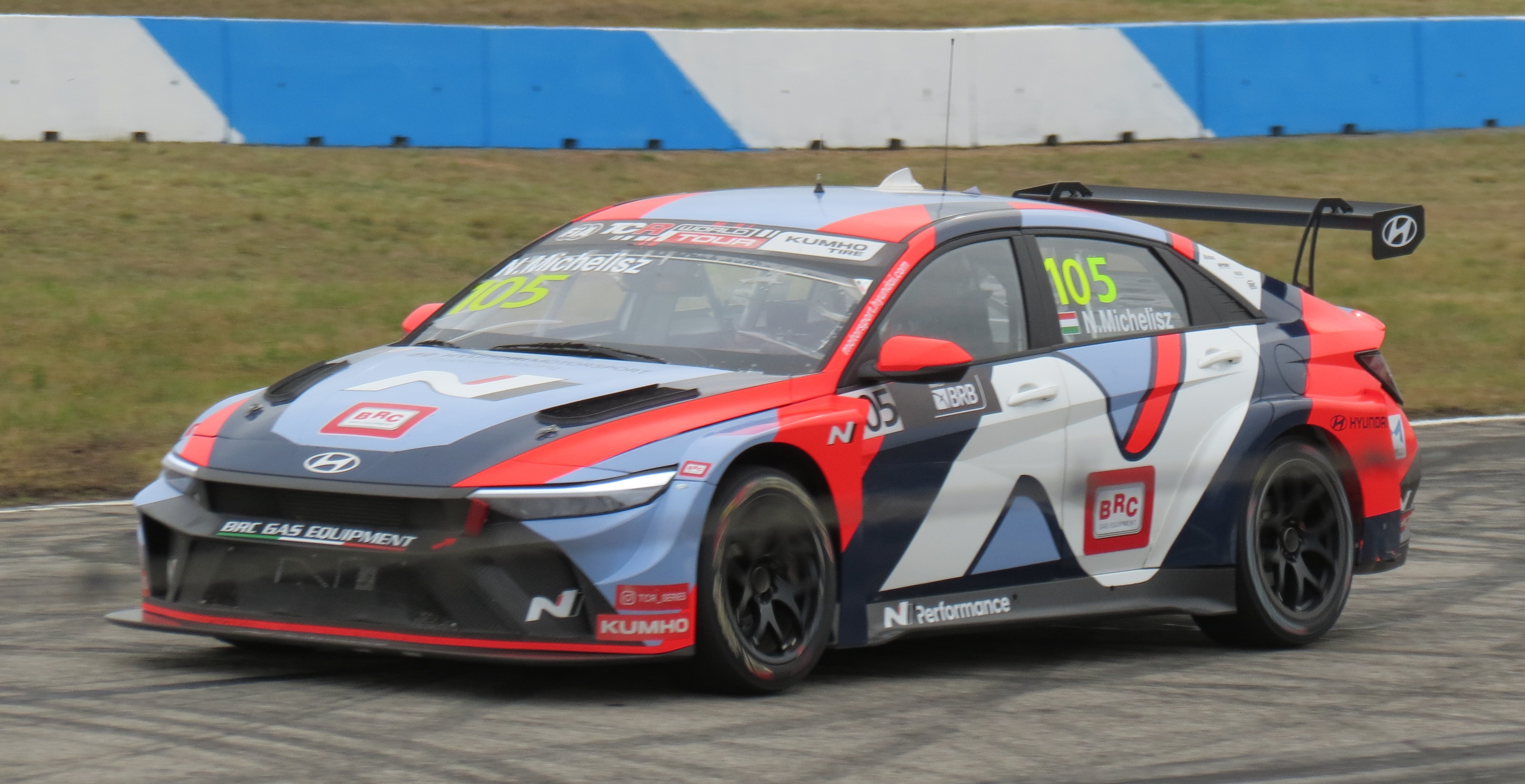
Norbert Michelisz's Elantra N TCR (2024) during the 2024 TCR World Tour round at Autódromo Víctor Borrat Fabini

The Hyundai Elantra N TCR is a racing car developed by Hyundai Motorsport. It is Hyundai's third TCR car after the Hyundai i30 N TCR and the Hyundai Veloster N TCR.

== Development ==
The Elantra N TCR was unveiled by Hyundai Motorsport in September 2020, before which it took part in an intensive test program for three months. With the help of Gabriele Tarquini, among others, ran 5,000 km (3,100 mi). both longer competition packages were developed in parallel. Spy photos of the events were also leaked.

The car is equipped with front-wheel drive and a two-liter turbocharged engine in accordance with the TCR rules, which came from the base engine of the then-completely new Hyundai Elantra. It has the same six-speed transmission with shift paddles as the previous two Hyundai TCR models and was officially unveiled at Auto China. Hyundai Motorsport said the project started with a completely blank sheet of paper, allowing designers and engineers in the Customer Racing department to take full advantage of Elantra's stable, high-performance chassis and limousine body to optimize design - its predecessors were sloping. To create the best competitive package, they were able to leverage the experience of more than two years of racing customers of the i30 N TCR and Veloster N TCR, while taking advantage of opportunities to upgrade their existing car wherever possible.

The car made its competitive debut at the 2021 Michelin Pilot Challenge season opener at the Daytona International Speedway. Among the highest-rated touring car series, several copies of the vehicle were launched in the WTCR and the TCR Europe Touring Car Series, the latter winning its first race, and in the TCR South America Touring Car Championship, several teams also bought them.
