= Attila Tassi =

Hungarian racing driver (born 1999)

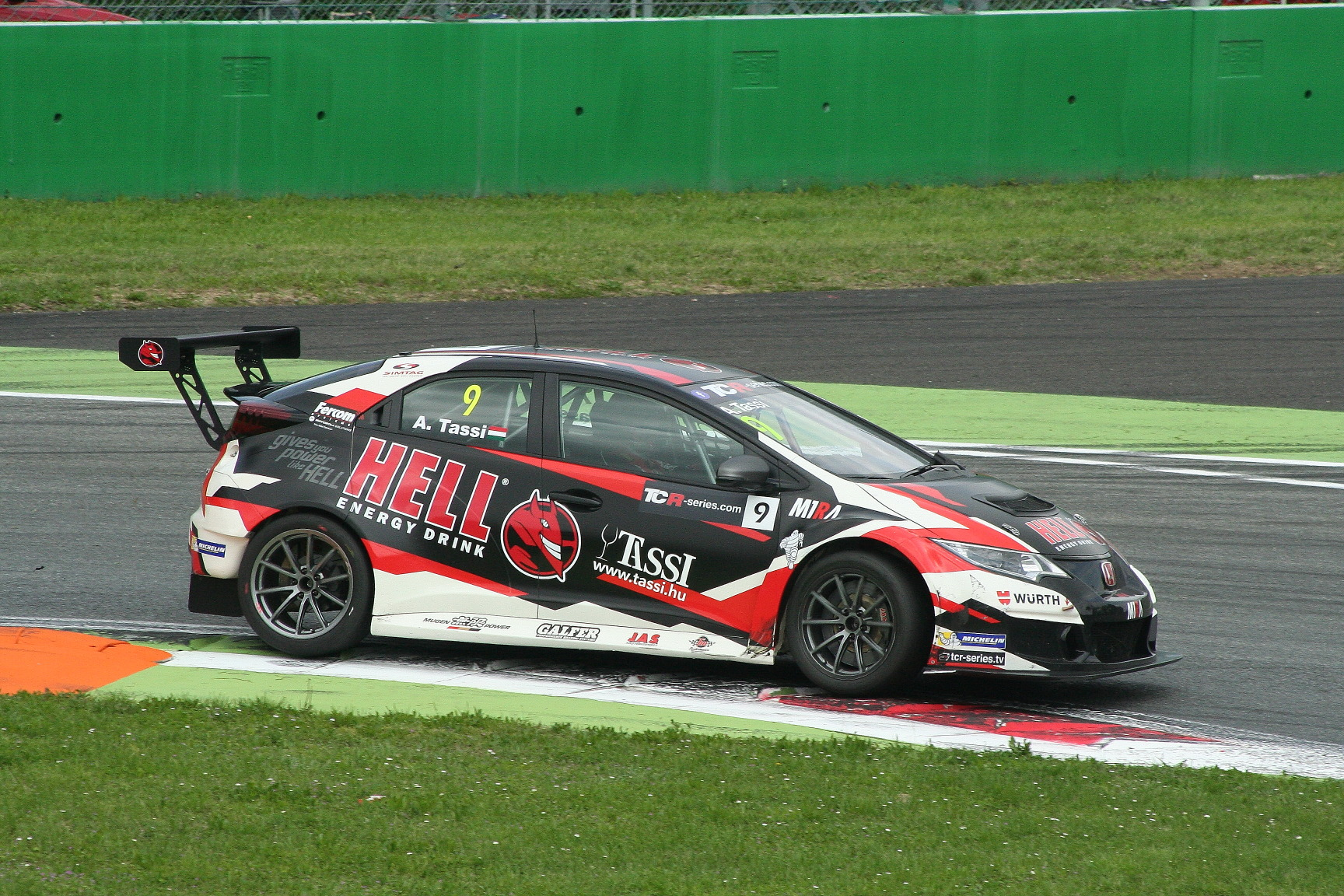
- Nationality: (Hungary) Hungarian
- Born: 14 June 1999 (age 27) Budapest, Hungary

TCR International Series career
- Debut season: 2016
- Current team: M1RA
- Car number: 9
- Former teams: B3 Racing Team Hungary
- Starts: 40
- Wins: 2
- Poles: 0
- Fastest laps: 2
- Best finish: 2nd in 2017

Previous series
- 2015 2012-15: SEAT León Eurocup; Hungarian Suzuki Cup

Attila Tassi (born 14 June 1999) is a Hungarian racing driver currently competing in the World Touring Car Cup. Having previously competed in the SEAT León Eurocup, TCR International Series and Hungarian Suzuki Cup.

== Racing career ==
Tassi began his career in 2012 in the Hungarian Suzuki Cup, he raced there until 2015. He switched to the SEAT León Eurocup for 2015, finishing 25th in the championship standings.

In February 2016, it was announced that Tassi would race in the TCR International Series, driving a SEAT León TCR for B3 Racing.

In March 2017, it was announced that Tassi would continue racing in the TCR International Series, but he would switch to Honda Civic TCR for M1RA.

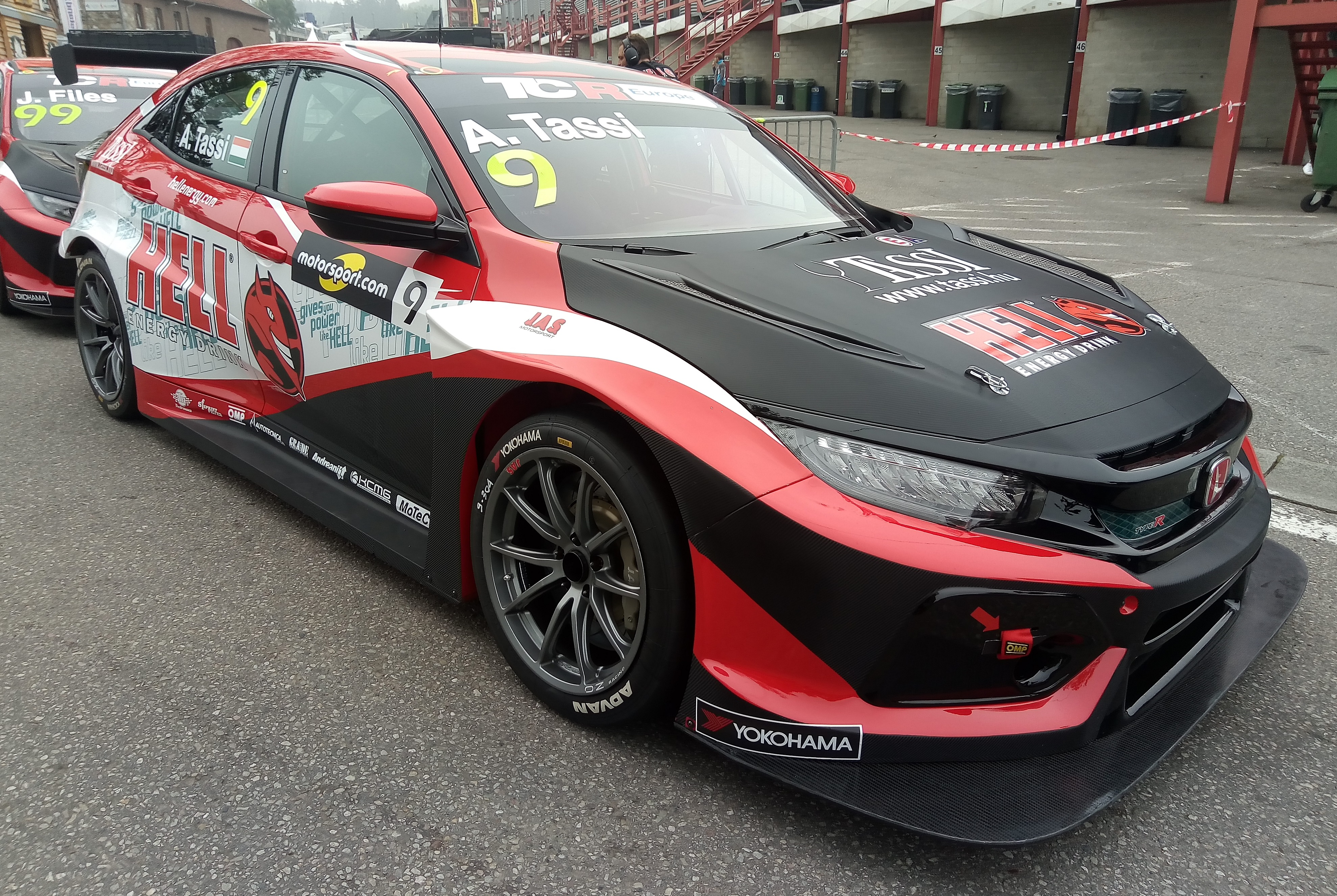
Attila Tassi TCR Honda Civic

== Racing record ==
=== Career summary ===
Season	Series	Team	Races	Wins	Poles	F/Laps	Podiums	Points	Position
2015	SEAT León Eurocup	B3 Hungary KFT	6	0	0	0	0	0	25th
2015	24H Series - D1	RCM Motorsport	1	0	1	0	1	27	4th
2016	TCR International Series	B3 Racing Team Hungary	20	0	0	0	1	68	11th
2017	TCR International Series	M1RA	20	2	0	1	7	197	**2nd**
2018	TCR Europe Touring Car Series	Hell Energy Racing with KCMG	14	1	1	2	5	153	4th
2018	World Touring Car Cup	KCMG	3	0	0	0	0	0	36th
2019	World Touring Car Cup	KCMG	29	0	1	2	0	56	24th
2019	Super Taikyu - ST-TCR	KCMG	1	0	0	1	0	55‡	9th‡
2020	World Touring Car Cup	ALL-INKL.DE Münnich Motorsport	15	0	0	0	2	100	12th
2021	World Touring Car Cup	ALL-INKL.DE Münnich Motorsport	16	1	1	0	1	96	14th
2022	World Touring Car Cup	Engstler Honda Type R Liqui Moly Racing Team	16	0	0	0	1	83	13th

‡ Team Standings

=== Complete TCR International Series results ===
(key) (Races in bold indicate pole position) (Races in italics indicate fastest lap)

Year	Team	Car	1	2	3	4	5	6	7	8	9	10	11	12	13	14	15	16	17	18	19	20	21	22	DC	Points
2016	B3 Racing Team Hungary	SEAT León TCR	BHR; 1 DNS	BHR; 2 DNS	EST; 1; 14	EST; 2; 13	SPA; 1; 16†	SPA; 2; 15	IMO; 1; 7	IMO; 2; 7	SAL; 1; 6	**SAL**; **2**; 8	OSC; 1 DSQ	OSC; 2; 7	SOC; 1; 10	**SOC**; **2**; 3	CHA; 1; 8	CHA; 2; 6	MRN; 1; 9	MRN; 2; 17†	SEP; 1; 7	SEP; 2; 9	MAC; 1; 20	MAC; 2 Ret	11th	68
2017	M1RA	Honda Civic Type R TCR	RIM; 1; 5	RIM; 2; 2	BHR; 1; 12	BHR; 2; 8	SPA; 1; 3	SPA; 2; 9	MNZ; 1; 2	MNZ; 2; 9	SAL; 1; 9	SAL; 2; 2	HUN; 1; 1	HUN; 2; 1	OSC; 1 DSQ	OSC; 2; 11†	CHA; 1; 3	CHA; 2; 4	ZHE; 1; 11	ZHE; 2; 9	DUB; 1; 5	DUB; 2; 12			2nd	197

^{†} Driver did not finish the race, but was classified as he completed over 75% of the race distance.

=== Complete TCR Europe Touring Car Series results ===
(key) (Races in bold indicate pole position) (Races in italics indicate fastest lap)

Year	Team	Car	1	2	3	4	5	6	7	8	9	10	11	12	13	14	DC	Points
2018	Hell Energy Racing with KCMG	Honda Civic Type R TCR	LEC; 1 Ret	LEC; 2; 6	ZAN; 1; 2^{3}	ZAN; 2; 3	SPA; 1; 17	SPA; 2 Ret	HUN; 1 Ret^{2}	HUN; 2; 4	ASS; 1; 5	ASS; 2; 1	MNZ; 1; 5^{3}	MNZ; 2; 3	**CAT**; **1**; 1^{1}	CAT; 2 Ret	4th	153

=== Complete World Touring Car Cup results ===
(key) (Races in bold indicate pole position) (Races in italics indicate fastest lap)

Year	Team	Car	1	2	3	4	5	6	7	8	9	10	11	12	13	14	15	16	17	18	19	20	21	22	23	24	25	26	27	28	29	30	DC	Points
2018	KCMG	Honda Civic Type R TCR	MAR; 1	MAR; 2	MAR; 3	HUN; 1; 19	HUN; 2; 18	HUN; 3; 15	GER; 1	GER; 2	GER; 3	NED; 1	NED; 2	NED; 3	POR; 1	POR; 2	POR; 3	SVK; 1	SVK; 2	SVK; 3	CHN; 1	CHN; 2	CHN; 3	WUH; 1	WUH; 2	WUH; 3	JPN; 1	JPN; 2	JPN; 3	MAC; 1	MAC; 2	MAC; 3	36th	0
2019	KCMG	Honda Civic Type R TCR	MAR; 1; 19	MAR; 2; 20	MAR; 3; 11	HUN; 1; 15	HUN; 2; 8	HUN; 3; 14	SVK; 1; 18	SVK; 2 Ret	SVK; 3; 25	NED; 1 DSQ	NED; 2 Ret	NED; 3; 22	GER; 1; 20	GER; 2; 4	GER; 3 Ret	POR; 1; 19	POR; 2; 11	**POR**; **3** Ret	CHN; 1; 23	CHN; 2; 6	CHN; 3; 13	JPN; 1; 21	JPN; 2; 24	JPN; 3; 16	MAC; 1; 18	MAC; 2; 22†	MAC; 3; 16	MAL; 1; 13	MAL; 2 Ret	MAL; 3 DNS	24th	56
2020	ALL-INKL.DE Münnich Motorsport	Honda Civic Type R TCR	BEL; 1; 3	BEL; 2; 20	GER; 1 Ret	GER; 2; 3	SVK; 1; 11	SVK; 2 Ret	SVK; 3 DNS	HUN; 1; 5	HUN; 2; 8	HUN; 3; 6	ESP; 1; 17	ESP; 2; 13	ESP; 3 Ret	ARA; 1; 10	ARA; 2; 8	ARA; 3; 10															12th	100
2021	ALL-INKL.DE Münnich Motorsport	Honda Civic Type R TCR	GER; 1; 12	GER; 2; 4	POR; 1; 7	POR; 2; 1	ESP; 1; 17	ESP; 2; 15	HUN; 1; 13	HUN; 2; 10	CZE; 1 Ret	CZE; 2 Ret	FRA; 1; 12	FRA; 2; 16	ITA; 1; 16	ITA; 2; 12	RUS; 1; 7	RUS; 2; 4															14th	96
2022	Engstler Honda Type R Liqui Moly Racing Team	Honda Civic Type R TCR	FRA; 1; 17	FRA; 2; 13	GER; 1 C	GER; 2 C	HUN; 1; 14	HUN; 2; 14	ESP; 1 Ret	ESP; 2; 13	POR; 1; 9	POR; 2; 2	ITA; 1; 5	ITA; 2; 8	ALS; 1 Ret	ALS; 2; 9	BHR; 1; 9	BHR; 2 Ret	SAU; 1; 14	SAU; 2 Ret													13th	83

^{†} Driver did not finish the race, but was classified as he completed over 90% of the race distance.
