= Éric Cayrolle =

French racing driver

- Nationality: (France) French
- Born: Éric Jean Pierre Cayrolle; August 27, 1962 (age 64) Pau (France)

World Touring Car Championship career
- Debut season: 2009
- Current team: SUNRED Engineering
- Categorisation: FIA Bronze
- Car number: 29
- Starts: 2
- Wins: 0
- Poles: 0
- Fastest laps: 0

Previous series
- 2006-08 2002-03 2001 1996–2000 1996, 1998 1996 1993–95 1992–93 1988–91 1987 1984–86: French GT Championship; European Touring Car Championship; European Super Touring; French Supertouring Championship; French Touring Car Championship; Spanish Touring Car Championship; French Sport Prototypes; Peugeot 905 Spider Cup; French F3; French Formula Renault; French Renault 5 Turbo Cup

Championship titles
- 1996–98 1996, 1998: French Supertouring Championship; French Touring Car Championship

Éric Jean Pierre Cayrolle (born 27 August 1962 in Pau) is a French auto racing driver.

== Racing career ==
Cayrolle is a three-time champion of the French Supertouring Championship, winning for three consecutive years between 1996 and 1998. Prior to this, he competed in Formula Renault and Formula Three in his native country. After his success in the French Supertouring Championship, he moved to the European series in 2001, which became the European Touring Car Championship the following year. Since then, he has also competed in the French GT Championship.

Cayrolle made a brief return to touring cars in 2009, competing in the two rounds of the FIA World Touring Car Championship at his home town of Pau. He drove a SEAT León for SUNRED Engineering, winning the Independent's category in the second race despite having an accident while leading the class with one lap to go. He crashed in to the barriers and was clipped by the Chevrolet Cruze of Nicola Larini, bringing out the red flag for the second-time in the race. However, the race results were determined by the positions on the previous lap and Cayrolle finished the race eighth overall and winner of the independent's category.

== Racing record ==
=== Complete European Touring Car Championship results ===
(key) (Races in bold indicate pole position) (Races in italics indicate fastest lap)

Year	Team	Car	1	2	3	4	5	6	7	8	9	10	11	12	13	14	15	16	17	18	19	20	DC	Pts
2001	Max Team	BMW 320i	MNZ; 1; 10	MNZ; 2 Ret	BRN; 1; 5	BRN; 2; 7	MAG; 1; 6	MAG; 2 Ret	SIL; 1; 11	SIL; 2; 7	ZOL; 1; 11	ZOL; 2; 10	HUN; 1; 5	HUN; 2 Ret	A1R; 1; 10	A1R; 2; 12	NÜR; 1; 12	NÜR; 2; 9	JAR; 1; 8	JAR; 2; 11	EST; 1; 10	EST; 2 Ret	9th	357
2002	Scuderia Bigazzi	Alfa Romeo 156 GTA	MAG; 1 Ret	MAG; 2; 13†	SIL; 1; 7	SIL; 2; 12†	BRN; 1; 10	BRN; 2; 11	JAR; 1; 12	JAR; 2; 9	AND; 1; 13	AND; 2 Ret	OSC; 1; 9	OSC; 2 Ret	SPA; 1; 8	SPA; 2; 7	PER; 1; 11	PER; 2; 9	DON; 1 Ret	DON; 2 Ret	EST; 1; 8	EST; 2; 8	NC	0
2003	Scuderia Bigazzi	Alfa Romeo 156 GTA	VAL; 1; 14	VAL; 2; 14	MAG; 1 NC	MAG; 2 Ret	PER; 1 Ret	PER; 2 DNS	BRN; 1; 14	BRN; 2; 12	DON; 1; 14	DON; 2; 14	SPA; 1 Ret	SPA; 2 DNS	AND; 1	AND; 2	OSC; 1	OSC; 2	EST; 1	EST; 2	MNZ; 1	MNZ; 2	NC	0

=== Complete World Touring Car Championship results ===
(key) (Races in bold indicate pole position) (Races in italics indicate fastest lap)

Year	Team	Car	1	2	3	4	5	6	7	8	9	10	11	12	13	14	15	16	17	18	19	20	21	22	23	24	DC	Points
2009	SUNRED Engineering	SEAT León 2.0 TFSI	BRA; 1	BRA; 2	MEX; 1	MEX; 2	MAR; 1	MAR; 2	FRA; 1; 10	FRA; 2; 8	ESP; 1	ESP; 2	CZE; 1	CZE; 2	POR; 1	POR; 2	GBR; 1	GBR; 2	GER; 1	GER; 2	ITA; 1	ITA; 2	JPN; 1	JPN; 2	MAC; 1	MAC; 2	19th	1

=== Complete World Touring Car Cup results ===
(key) (Races in bold indicate pole position) (Races in italics indicate fastest lap)

Year	Team	Car	1	2	3	4	5	6	7	8	9	10	11	12	13	14	15	16	17	18	DC	Points
2022	Comtoyou Team Audi Sport	Audi RS 3 LMS TCR	FRA; 1; 14	FRA; 2; 14	GER; 1	GER; 2	HUN; 1	HUN; 2	ESP; 1	ESP; 2	POR; 1	POR; 2	ITA; 1	ITA; 2	ALS; 1	ALS; 2	BHR; 1	BHR; 2	SAU; 1	SAU; 2	NC‡	0‡

^{‡} As Cayrolle was a Wildcard entry, he was ineligible to score points.

=== Complete TCR Europe Touring Car Series results ===
(key) (Races in bold indicate pole position) (Races in italics indicate fastest lap)

Year	Team	Car	1	2	3	4	5	6	7	8	9	10	11	12	13	14	DC	Points
2023	Comtoyou Racing	Audi RS 3 LMS TCR	ALG; 1	ALG; 2	PAU; 1; 5	PAU; 2 Ret	SPA; 1	SPA; 2	HUN; 1	HUN; 2	LEC; 1	LEC; 2	MNZ; 1	MNZ; 2	CAT; 1	CAT; 2	22nd	26
