= Dániel Nagy (racing driver) =

Hungarian racing driver (born 1998)

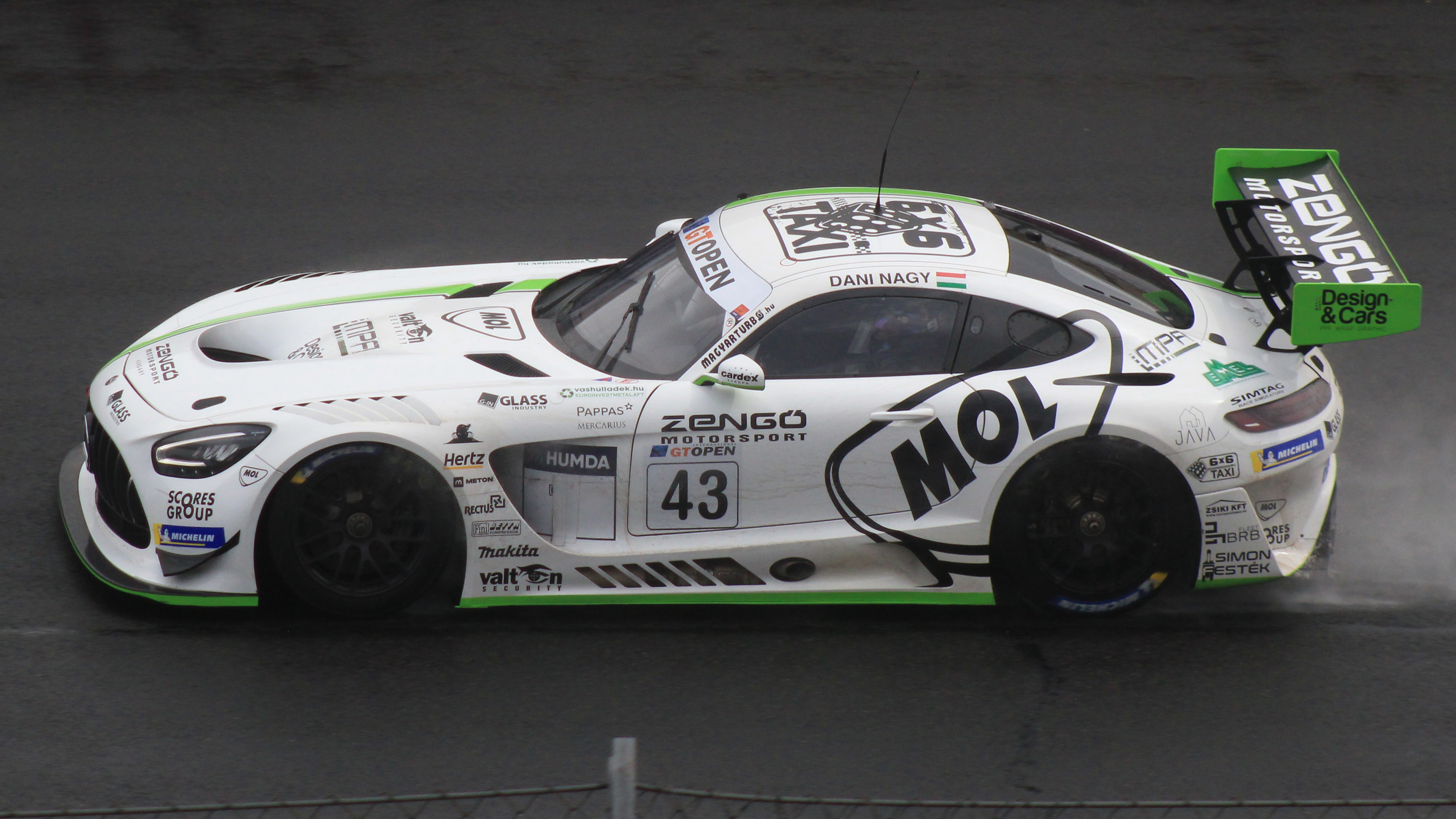
- Nagy at the Hungaroring in 2024
- Nationality: (Hungary) Hungarian
- Born: 9 April 1998 (age 28) Budapest, Hungary

International GT Open career
- Debut season: 2016
- Current team: Zengő Motorsport
- Car number: 99
- Starts: 2
- Wins: 0
- Poles: 0
- Fastest laps: 0
- Best finish: 20th in 2017

Previous series
- 2015 2012-2015: TCR International Series; Hungarian Suzuki Swift Cup

Championship titles
- 2013, 15: Hungarian Suzuki Swift Cup

Dániel Nagy (born 9 April 1998) is a Hungarian racing driver currently competing in the World Touring Car Championship for Zengő Motorsport. He previously competed in the TCR International Series and the Hungarian Suzuki Swift Cup, where he won the title in 2013 and 2015 while still a teenager.

Nagy is the brother of water polo player Viktor Nagy.

== Racing career ==
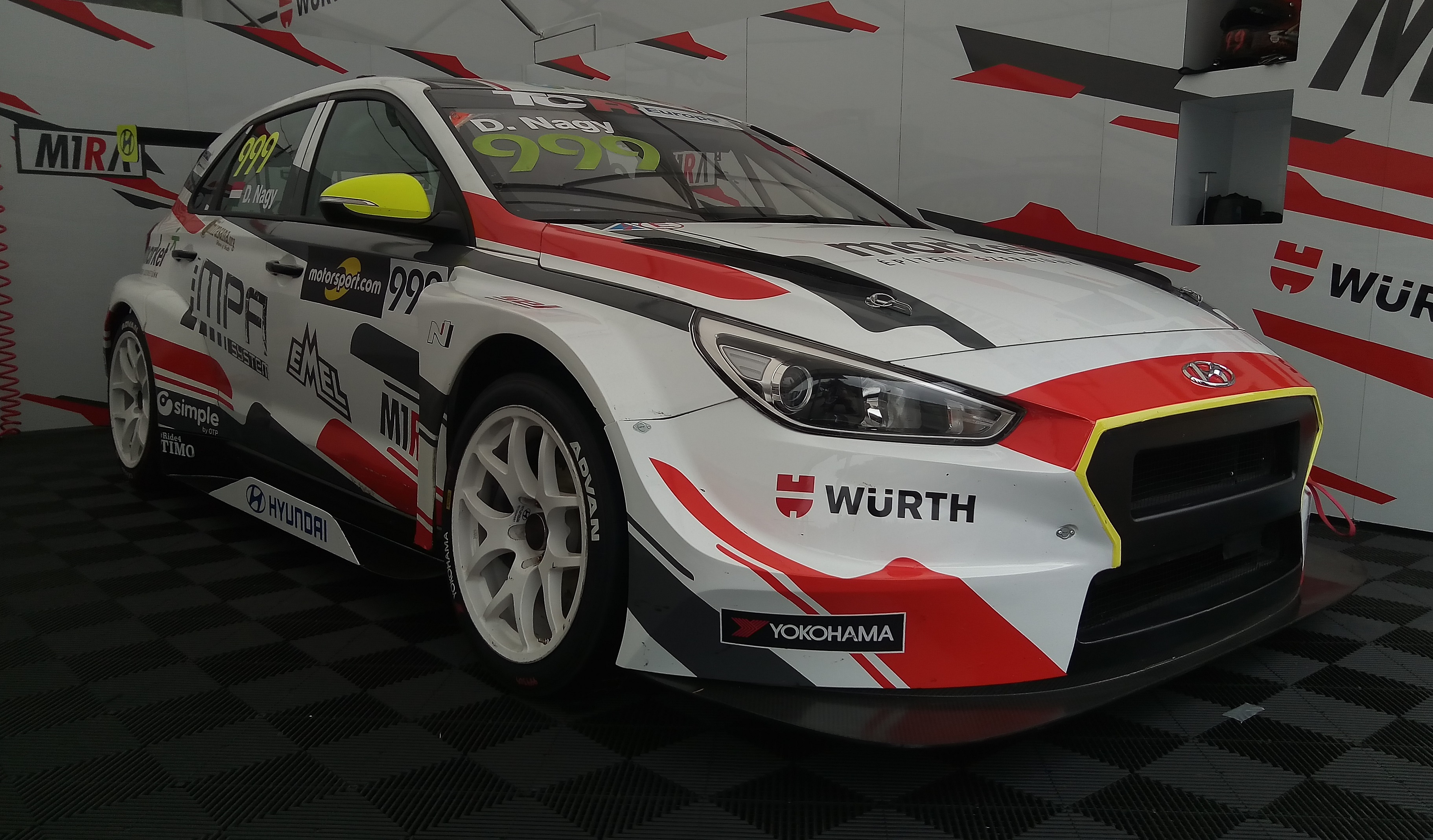
The Hyundai i30 N as used by Nagy in 2018.

Nagy began his career in 2011 in the Hungarian Suzuki Swift Cup, he won the championship in 2013 and 2015. In July 2015, it was announced that Nagy would make his TCR International Series debut with Zengő Motorsport driving a SEAT León Cup Racer. He competed at the Red Bull Ring round of the championship, qualifying in third on his debut. In March 2016, he was announced as part of Zengő's team for their 2016 World Touring Car Championship campaign, driving a Honda Civic. Nagy competed in the final five events of the 2016 WTCC season, with a best finish of 11th, which he achieved at the series finale in Qatar.

== Racing record ==
=== Career summary ===
Season	Series	Team	Races	Wins	Poles	F/Laps	Podiums	Points	Position
2015	TCR International Series	Zengő Motorsport	1	0	0	0	0	3	36th
2016	World Touring Car Championship	Zengő Motorsport	10	0	0	0	0	0	NC
2017	TCR International Series	Zengő Motorsport	1	0	0	0	0	0	NC
2017	World Touring Car Championship	Zengő Motorsport	20	0	0	1	0	1	19th
2018	TCR Europe Touring Car Series	M1RA	14	1	0	1	6	138	5th
2018	World Touring Car Cup	M1RA	3	0	0	1	1	36	20th
2019	TCR Europe Touring Car Series	M1RA	8	0	0	0	1	60	21st
2020	TCR Europe Touring Car Series	BRC Racing Team	12	0	0	0	1	202	8th
2021	TCR Europe Touring Car Series	Zengő Motorsport	2	0	0	0	1	60	18th
2022	World Touring Car Cup	Zengő Motorsport	14	0	0	0	0	62	16th
2024	International GT Open	Zengő Motorsport	2	0	0	0	0	0	60th

=== Complete TCR International Series results ===
(key) (Races in bold indicate pole position) (Races in italics indicate fastest lap)

Year	Team	Car	1	2	3	4	5	6	7	8	9	10	11	12	13	14	15	16	17	18	19	20	21	22	DC	Points
2015	Zengő Motorsport	SEAT León Cup Racer	SEP; 1	SEP; 2	SHA; 1	SHA; 2	VAL; 1	VAL; 2	ALG; 1	ALG; 2	MNZ; 1	MNZ; 2	SAL; 1	SAL; 2	SOC; 1	SOC; 2	RBR; 1 Ret	RBR; 2 DNS	MRN; 1	MRN; 2	CHA; 1	CHA; 2	MAC; 1	MAC; 2	36th	3
2017	Zengő Motorsport	SEAT León TCR	RIM; 1	RIM; 2	BHR; 1	BHR; 2	SPA; 1	SPA; 2	MNZ; 1	MNZ; 2	SAL; 1	SAL; 2	HUN; 1; 15	HUN; 2 DNS	OSC; 1	OSC; 2	CHA; 1	CHA; 2	ZHE; 1	ZHE; 2	DUB; 1	DUB; 2			NC	0

=== Complete World Touring Car Championship results ===
(key) (Races in bold indicate pole position) (Races in italics indicate fastest lap)

Year	Team	Car	1	2	3	4	5	6	7	8	9	10	11	12	13	14	15	16	17	18	19	20	21	22	DC	Points
2016	Zengő Motorsport	Honda Civic WTCC	FRA; 1 WD	FRA; 2 WD	SVK; 1	SVK; 2	HUN; 1	HUN; 2	MAR; 1	MAR; 2	GER; 1	GER; 2	RUS; 1	RUS; 2	POR; 1; 17	POR; 2 Ret	ARG; 1; 15	ARG; 2; 17	JPN; 1; 15	JPN; 2; 19	CHN; 1; 15	CHN; 2; 18	QAT; 1; 11	QAT; 2; 15	NC	0
2017	Zengő Motorsport	Honda Civic WTCC	MAR; 1; 11†	MAR; 2; 14	ITA; 1; 10	ITA; 2 Ret	HUN; 1; 13	HUN; 2 Ret	GER; 1; 14	GER; 2 Ret	POR; 1; 13	POR; 2; 14	ARG; 1; 12	ARG; 2; 14	CHN; 1 DSQ	CHN; 2 DSQ	JPN; 1; 15	JPN; 2; 14	MAC; 1; 15	MAC; 2; 11	QAT; 1; 15	QAT; 2; 13			19th	1

^{†} Did not finish the race, but was classified as he completed over 90% of the race distance.

=== Complete TCR Europe Touring Car Series results ===
(key) (Races in bold indicate pole position) (Races in italics indicate fastest lap)

Year	Team	Car	1	2	3	4	5	6	7	8	9	10	11	12	13	14	DC	Points
2018	M1RA	Hyundai i30 N TCR	LEC; 1; 2^{3}	LEC; 2; 3	ZAN; 1; 7	ZAN; 2; 11	SPA; 1; 8	SPA; 2; 6	HUN; 1; 3	HUN; 2; 2	ASS; 1; 1^{4}	ASS; 2 Ret	MNZ; 1 Ret	MNZ; 2; 12	CAT; 1; 7	CAT; 2; 2	5th	138
2019	M1RA	Hyundai i30 N TCR	HUN; 1; 5	HUN; 2; 3	HOC; 1; 23	HOC; 2; 15	SPA; 1; 17	SPA; 2 Ret	RBR; 1; 13	RBR; 2 Ret	OSC; 1	OSC; 2	CAT; 1	CAT; 2	MNZ; 1	MNZ; 2	21st	60
2020	BRC Racing Team	Hyundai i30 N TCR	LEC; 1; 11	LEC; 2; 10	ZOL; 1; 4^{6}	ZOL; 2; 3	MNZ; 1; 6	MNZ; 2; 13	CAT; 1; 6^{3}	CAT; 2; 5	SPA; 1; 17	SPA; 2; 6	JAR; 1; 7^{9}	JAR; 2; 20†			8th	202
2021	Zengő Motorsport	CUPRA León Competición TCR	SVK; 1; 3^{3}	SVK; 2; 5	LEC; 1 WD	LEC; 2 WD	ZAN; 1	ZAN; 2	SPA; 1	SPA; 2	NÜR; 1	NÜR; 2	MNZ; 1	MNZ; 2	CAT; 1	CAT; 2	18th	60

^{†} Driver did not finish the race, but was classified as he completed over 90% of the race distance.

=== Complete World Touring Car Cup results ===
(key) (Races in bold indicate pole position) (Races in italics indicate fastest lap)

Year	Team	Car	1	2	3	4	5	6	7	8	9	10	11	12	13	14	15	16	17	18	19	20	21	22	23	24	25	26	27	28	29	30	DC	Points
2018	M1RA	Hyundai i30 N TCR	MAR; 1	MAR; 2	MAR; 3	HUN; 1; 7	HUN; 2; 2	HUN; 3; 6	GER; 1	GER; 2	GER; 3	NED; 1	NED; 2	NED; 3	POR; 1	POR; 2	POR; 3	SVK; 1	SVK; 2	SVK; 3	CHN; 1	CHN; 2	CHN; 3	WUH; 1	WUH; 2	WUH; 3	JPN; 1	JPN; 2	JPN; 3	MAC; 1	MAC; 2	MAC; 3	20th	36
2022	Zengő Motorsport	CUPRA León Competición TCR	FRA; 1; 13	FRA; 2; 11	GER; 1 C	GER; 2 C	HUN; 1; 17	HUN; 2 Ret	ESP; 1 Ret	ESP; 2; 4	POR; 1; 12	POR; 2 Ret	ITA; 1	ITA; 2	ALS; 1; 8	ALS; 2; 12	BHR; 1; 11	BHR; 2; 10	SAU; 1 Ret	SAU; 2; 7													16th	62
