= 2022 World Touring Car Cup =

Motorsport contest

The 2022 World Touring Car Cup was the fifth and final season of the World Touring Car Cup and 18th overall of the series, which dates back to the 2005 World Touring Car Championship. The season began on 7 May at the Circuit de Pau-Ville and ended on 27 November in Jeddah Corniche Circuit, however multiple event cancellations due to the Russian invasion of Ukraine and ongoing quarantine restrictions in Asia. On 1 September 2022, the organiser announced the final version of the calendar, adding Bahrain and Saudi Arabia as final venues for the 2022 season.

The season was marred by issues with tyres as drivers suffered numerous tyre failures on several rounds. These led to the cancellation of the races at the Nürburgring and Cyan Racing withdrawing from the series midway through the year. Only nine drivers completed the full season.

On 14 October 2022, the promoter Discovery Sports Events announced that after five seasons of running the WTCR, the series would be discontinued following the conclusion of the season, which had two rounds remaining in Bahrain (10–12 November) and Saudi Arabia (25–27 November. This resulted in TCR global rights holder WSC Group creating a new format, known as the TCR World Tour, influenced by golf's Official World Golf Ranking, in that all TCR events will be grouped for official TCR World Ranking points, which will be used to qualify drivers into a playoff at the end of the season, and a new format featuring events from different TCR-featured tours where drivers can also qualify for the TCR World Ranking Final.

== Teams and drivers ==
Team	Car	No.	Drivers	Class	Rounds	Ref.
(Italy) BRC Hyundai N Squadra Corse	Hyundai Elantra N TCR	5	(Hungary) Norbert Michelisz		All	
(Italy) BRC Hyundai N Squadra Corse	Hyundai Elantra N TCR	96	(Spain) Mikel Azcona		All	
(Germany) Liqui Moly Team Engstler	Honda Civic Type R TCR (FK8)	9	(Hungary) Attila Tassi		All	
(Germany) Liqui Moly Team Engstler	Honda Civic Type R TCR (FK8)	18	(Portugal) Tiago Monteiro		All	
(Germany) ALL-INKL.COM Münnich Motorsport	Honda Civic Type R TCR (FK8)	29	(Argentina) Néstor Girolami		All	
(Germany) ALL-INKL.COM Münnich Motorsport	Honda Civic Type R TCR (FK8)	86	(Argentina) Esteban Guerrieri		All	
(Sweden) Cyan Performance Lynk & Co	Lynk & Co 03 TCR	11	(Sweden) Thed Björk		1–6	
(Sweden) Cyan Performance Lynk & Co	Lynk & Co 03 TCR	12	(Uruguay) Santiago Urrutia		1–6	
(Sweden) Cyan Performance Lynk & Co	Lynk & Co 03 TCR	55	(China) Ma Qing Hua		1–6	
(Sweden) Cyan Racing Lynk & Co	Lynk & Co 03 TCR	68	(France) Yann Ehrlacher		1–6	
(Sweden) Cyan Racing Lynk & Co	Lynk & Co 03 TCR	100	(France) Yvan Muller		1–6	
(Belgium) Comtoyou Team Audi Sport	Audi RS 3 LMS TCR (2021)	16	(Belgium) Gilles Magnus		All	
(Belgium) Comtoyou Team Audi Sport	Audi RS 3 LMS TCR (2021)	25	(Morocco) Mehdi Bennani	T	1–8	
(Belgium) Comtoyou Team Audi Sport	Audi RS 3 LMS TCR (2021)	72	(Argentina) Franco Girolami	T	9	
(Belgium) Comtoyou DHL Team Audi Sport	Audi RS 3 LMS TCR (2021)	17	(France) Nathanaël Berthon		All	
(Belgium) Comtoyou DHL Team Audi Sport	Audi RS 3 LMS TCR (2021)	33	(Netherlands) Tom Coronel	T	All	
(Hungary) Zengő Motorsport	Cupra León Competición TCR	66	(Hungary) Bence Boldizs	T	8	
(Hungary) Zengő Motorsport	Cupra León Competición TCR	79	(United Kingdom) Robert Huff	T	1–7, 9	
(Hungary) Zengő Motorsport	Cupra León Competición TCR	99	(Hungary) Dániel Nagy	T	1–5, 7–9	
Wildcard entries
(Belgium) Comtoyou Racing	Audi RS 3 LMS TCR (2021)	24	(Saudi Arabia) Ahmed BinKhanen		9	
(Belgium) Comtoyou Racing	Audi RS 3 LMS TCR (2021)	72	(Argentina) Franco Girolami		8	
(Belgium) Comtoyou Racing	Audi RS 3 LMS TCR (2021)	110	(North Macedonia) Viktor Davidovski		8–9	
(Belgium) Comtoyou Team Audi Sport	Audi RS 3 LMS TCR (2021)	64	(France) Éric Cayrolle		1	
(Italy) BRC Hyundai N Racing Team	Hyundai Elantra N TCR	88	(Netherlands) Nicky Catsburg		8–9	

Legend
T	Eligible for WTCR Trophy

=== Summary ===
- JAS Motorsport and Honda Racing retained their 2021 drivers – Attila Tassi, Tiago Monteiro, Néstor Girolami and Esteban Guerrieri – for the 2022 season but on 15 January it was announced that Engstler Motorsport will switch from Hyundai to Honda.
- Mikel Azcona will switch from Zengő Motorsport Services KFT to BRC Hyundai N Lukoil Squadra Corse to replace Gabriele Tarquini.
- 2020 TCR China Touring Car Championship winner Ma Qing Hua returned to the series after having last raced in 2019 for Team Mulsanne, driving a car for Cyan Performance Lynk & Co.
- 2020 TCR Europe Touring Car Series winner Mehdi Bennani returned to the series and Comtoyou Racing after having last raced in 2019 for SLR VW Motorsport to replace last season's runner-up Frédéric Vervisch.
- Dániel Nagy returned to the series and Zengő Motorsport after having last taken part in the series in 2018, to replace Bence Boldizs.

==== Mid-season changes ====
- Cyan Racing withdrew from the Race of Italy, citing tire safety concerns. Cyan Racing would later suspend their WTCR program with immediate effect for the same reason in August 2022 and not see out the season.

== Calendar ==
The preliminary race calendar was published by the championship management on 26 November 2021. On 26 February 2022, WTCR Race of Russia was suspended due to the ongoing Russian invasion of Ukraine. On 19 March 2022, the calendar was updated again with the cancellation of the Czech and Russian rounds. A further update was ratified on 14 April 2022, with the addition of two rounds at Vallelunga and Anneau du Rhin. Another update was made on 29 June 2022 by cancelling Asian rounds due to the logistical challenges and quarantine restrictions in Asia: An update was provided on 1 September 2022 by adding races in Bahrain and Saudi Arabia to host the final rounds of the championship.

Round	Race	Race name	Circuit	Date	Supporting
1	1	WTCR Race of France	(France) Circuit de Pau-Ville	7–8 May	Pau Motors Festival; Euroformula Open (Pau Grand Prix); ETCR Championship; French F4 Championship
1	2	WTCR Race of France	(France) Circuit de Pau-Ville	7–8 May	Pau Motors Festival; Euroformula Open (Pau Grand Prix); ETCR Championship; French F4 Championship
2	3	WTCR Goodyear Race of Germany	(Germany) Nürburgring Nordschleife	26–28 May	Nürburgring 24 Hours
2	4	WTCR Goodyear Race of Germany	(Germany) Nürburgring Nordschleife	26–28 May	Nürburgring 24 Hours
3	5	WTCR Goodyear Race of Hungary	(Hungary) Hungaroring	11–12 June	ETCR Championship
3	6	WTCR Goodyear Race of Hungary	(Hungary) Hungaroring	11–12 June	ETCR Championship
4	7	WTCR DHL Race of Spain	(Spain) Ciudad del Motor de Aragón	25–26 June	
4	8	WTCR DHL Race of Spain	(Spain) Ciudad del Motor de Aragón	25–26 June	
5	9	WTCR Race of Portugal	(Portugal) Circuito Internacional de Vila Real	2–3 July	
5	10	WTCR Race of Portugal	(Portugal) Circuito Internacional de Vila Real	2–3 July	
6	11	WTCR Race of Italy	(Italy) Autodromo Vallelunga Piero Taruffi	23–24 July	ETCR Championship
6	12	WTCR Race of Italy	(Italy) Autodromo Vallelunga Piero Taruffi	23–24 July	ETCR Championship
7	13	WTCR Race of Alsace Grand Est	(Alsace) Anneau du Rhin	6–7 August	
7	14	WTCR Race of Alsace Grand Est	(Alsace) Anneau du Rhin	6–7 August	
8	15	WTCR Bapco Race of Bahrain	Bahrain International Circuit	10–12 November	FIA World Endurance Championship
8	16	WTCR Bapco Race of Bahrain	Bahrain International Circuit	10–12 November	FIA World Endurance Championship
9	17	WTCR Goodyear Race of Saudi Arabia	(Saudi Arabia) Jeddah Corniche Circuit	25–27 November	
9	18	WTCR Goodyear Race of Saudi Arabia	(Saudi Arabia) Jeddah Corniche Circuit	25–27 November	

The following rounds were cancelled due to the ongoing Russian invasion of Ukraine and logistical challenges in Asia:

Race name	Circuit	Date
WTCR Liqui Moly Race of Czech Republic	(Czech Republic) Autodrom Most	9–10 April
WTCR Race of Russia	(Russia) Sochi Autodrom	6–7 August
WTCR Race of Korea	(South Korea) Inje Speedium	8–9 October
WTCR Race of China	(China) Ningbo International Circuit	5–6 November
WTCR Race of Macau	(Macau) Guia Circuit	18–20 November

== Compensation weight handicaps ==
Compensation weight handicaps were given to the participating cars based on their best qualifying lap times in the previous two events, with 40 kg being the maximum penalty. Hyundai customer team BRC Racing Team was in particular noted to have gamed the system by intentionally performing worse than possible in qualifying to avoid being penalised.

Car	Pau	Nürburgring	Hungaroring	Aragón	Vila Real	Vallelunga	Anneau du Rhin	Bahrain	Jeddah
Audi RS 3 LMS TCR (2021)	0 kg	0 kg	0 kg	+10 kg	+40 kg	+40 kg	0 kg	0 kg	0 kg
Cupra León Competición TCR	0 kg	0 kg	0 kg	0 kg	0 kg	0 kg	0 kg	0 kg	0 kg
Honda Civic Type R TCR (FK8)	0 kg	+40 kg	+40 kg	+40 kg	+40 kg	+20 kg	+40 kg	+40 kg	+40 kg
Hyundai Elantra N TCR	0 kg	0 kg	0 kg	0 kg	0 kg	0 kg	0 kg	0 kg	+10 kg
Lynk & Co 03 TCR	0 kg	0 kg	0 kg	+10 kg	+20 kg	+40 kg	+40 kg	–	–

== Results ==
Race	Race name	Pole position	Fastest lap	Winning driver	Winning team	WTCR Trophy winner	Report
1	Race of France	(Argentina) Néstor Girolami	(United Kingdom) Robert Huff	(Argentina) Néstor Girolami	(Germany) ALL-INKL.COM Münnich Motorsport	(Morocco) Mehdi Bennani	Report
2	Race of France		(Spain) Mikel Azcona	(Spain) Mikel Azcona	(Italy) BRC Hyundai N Squadra Corse	(United Kingdom) Robert Huff	Report
3	Race of Germany	(Morocco) Mehdi Bennani	Race Cancelled				Report
4	Race of Germany		Race Cancelled				Report
5	Race of Hungary	(Spain) Mikel Azcona	(Spain) Mikel Azcona	(Spain) Mikel Azcona	(Italy) BRC Hyundai N Squadra Corse	(United Kingdom) Robert Huff	Report
6	Race of Hungary		(United Kingdom) Robert Huff	(Uruguay) Santiago Urrutia	(Sweden) Cyan Performance Lynk & Co	(United Kingdom) Robert Huff	Report
7	Race of Spain	(Belgium) Gilles Magnus	(Belgium) Gilles Magnus	(Belgium) Gilles Magnus	(Belgium) Comtoyou Team Audi Sport	(United Kingdom) Robert Huff	Report
8	Race of Spain		(United Kingdom) Robert Huff	(Spain) Mikel Azcona	(Italy) BRC Hyundai N Squadra Corse	(United Kingdom) Robert Huff	Report
9	Race of Portugal	(Uruguay) Santiago Urrutia	(Uruguay) Santiago Urrutia	(Uruguay) Santiago Urrutia	(Sweden) Cyan Performance Lynk & Co	(United Kingdom) Robert Huff	Report
10	Race of Portugal		(United Kingdom) Robert Huff	(United Kingdom) Robert Huff	(Hungary) Zengő Motorsport	(United Kingdom) Robert Huff	Report
11	Race of Italy	(Argentina) Néstor Girolami	(France) Nathanaël Berthon	(Argentina) Néstor Girolami	(Germany) ALL-INKL.COM Münnich Motorsport	(Netherlands) Tom Coronel	Report
12	Race of Italy		(Belgium) Gilles Magnus	(Belgium) Gilles Magnus	(Belgium) Audi Sport Team Comtoyou	(United Kingdom) Robert Huff	Report
13	Race of Alsace Grand Est	(Argentina) Néstor Girolami	(Argentina) Esteban Guerrieri	(France) Nathanaël Berthon	(Belgium) Comtoyou Team Audi Sport	(United Kingdom) Robert Huff	Report
14	Race of Alsace Grand Est		(Spain) Mikel Azcona	(United Kingdom) Robert Huff	(Hungary) Zengő Motorsport	(United Kingdom) Robert Huff	Report
15	Race of Bahrain	(Spain) Mikel Azcona	(Hungary) Norbert Michelisz	(Spain) Mikel Azcona	(Italy) BRC Hyundai N Squadra Corse	(Netherlands) Tom Coronel	Report
16	Race of Bahrain		(Hungary) Norbert Michelisz	(Hungary) Norbert Michelisz	(Italy) BRC Hyundai N Squadra Corse	(Netherlands) Tom Coronel	Report
17	Race of Saudi Arabia	(France) Nathanaël Berthon	(France) Nathanaël Berthon	(France) Nathanaël Berthon	(Belgium) Comtoyou Team Audi Sport	(Netherlands) Tom Coronel	Report
18	Race of Saudi Arabia		(Belgium) Gilles Magnus	(Belgium) Gilles Magnus	(Belgium) Comtoyou Team Audi Sport	(United Kingdom) Robert Huff	Report

== Championship standings ==
Scoring system

Position	1st	2nd	3rd	4th	5th	6th	7th	8th	9th	10th	11th	12th	13th	14th	15th
Qualifying (Q1-Q3 Best Lap Top 5)	10	8	6	4	2	—N/a									
Race 1	30	23	19	16	14	12	10	8	7	6	5	4	3	2	1
Race 2	25	20	16	13	11	10	9	8	7	6	5	4	3	2	1

Scoring system for WTCR Trophy

Position	1st	2nd	3rd	4th	5th	FL
Qualifying	1	—N/a				
Race	10	8	5	3	1	1

=== Drivers' championship ===
Pos.	Driver	FRA (France)		GER (Germany)		HUN (Hungary)		ESP (Spain)		PRT (Portugal)		ITA (Italy)		AGE (Alsace)		BHR (Bahrain)		SAU (Saudi Arabia)		Pts.
1	(Spain) Mikel Azcona	6^{4}	1	C^{5}	C	1	8	3	1	8	3	2^{2}	3	3^{3}	3	1^{1}	4	6^{2}	3	337
2	(Argentina) Néstor Girolami	1^{1}	7	C	C	7^{4}	3	12	12	3	9	1^{1}	5	2^{1}	7	4^{3}	9	10	8	254
3	(France) Nathanaël Berthon	16^{3}	4	C	C	3^{3}	12	4^{2}	8	10	Ret	9	2	1^{2}	8	3^{2}	5	1^{1}	Ret	240
4	(Hungary) Norbert Michelisz	9	Ret	C	C	12	4	6	Ret	4	5	4^{4}	4	4	4	2^{4}	1	2^{4}	4	222
5	(Belgium) Gilles Magnus	8^{5}	Ret	C^{2}	C	4^{1}	7	1^{1}	14	Ret	13	3	1	7^{5}	5	Ret	Ret	5^{3}	1	210
6	(United Kingdom) Robert Huff	12	8	C	C	6	2	2^{3}	2	6	1	8	6	5	1			9	5	210
7	(Argentina) Esteban Guerrieri	2^{2}	5	C	C	9^{5}	10	11	11	Ret	Ret	7^{3}	10	10^{4}	10	8	2	11	11	149
8	(Uruguay) Santiago Urrutia	7	2	C^{3}	C	8	1	8	3	1	10	DNS	DNS							137
9	(France) Yann Ehrlacher	4	15	C^{4}	C	2^{2}	6	5^{4}	5	2	8	DNS	DNS							133
10	(Netherlands) Tom Coronel	11	12	C	C	15	13	Ret	Ret	13	12	6	7	6	11	6	6	3^{5}	6	115
11	(Morocco) Mehdi Bennani	10	Ret	C^{1}	C	13	Ret	10	9	7	6	10	9	11	2	7	8			112
12	(China) Ma Qinghua	5	3	C	C	5	5	13	6	5	7	DNS	DNS							97
13	(Hungary) Attila Tassi	17	13	C	C	14	14	Ret	13	9	2	5^{5}	8	Ret	9	9^{6}	Ret	14	Ret	83
14	(France) Yvan Muller	3	6	C	C	10	9	7^{5}	7	14	4	DNS	DNS							78
15	(Portugal) Tiago Monteiro	15	10	C	C	16	15	14	15	11	Ret	11	11	9	6	12	12	13	9	70
16	(Hungary) Dániel Nagy	13	11	C	C	17	Ret	Ret	4	12	Ret			8	12	11	10	Ret	7	62
17	(Sweden) Thed Björk	Ret	9	C	C	11	11	9	10	Ret	11	DNS	DNS							35
18	(Argentina) Franco Girolami (Note: Franco Girolami was ineligible to score points at the Race of Bahrain as he was a wildcard entry.)															14	7	4	Ret	16
19	(Hungary) Bence Boldizs															13	11			12
Wildcard entries ineligible for points
—	(North Macedonia) Viktor Davidovski															10	13	8	2	—
—	(Netherlands) Nicky Catsburg															5^{5}	3	7	Ret	—
—	(Saudi Arabia) Ahmed BinKhanen																	12	10	—
—	(France) Éric Cayrolle	14	14																	—
Pos.	Driver	FRA (France)		GER (Germany)		HUN (Hungary)		ESP (Spain)		PRT (Portugal)		ITA (Italy)		AGE (Alsace)		BHR (Bahrain)		SAU (Saudi Arabia)		Pts.

Colour	Result
Gold	Winner
Silver	Second place
Bronze	Third place
Green	Points classification
Blue	Non-points classification
Blue	Non-classified finish (NC)
Purple	Retired, not classified (Ret)
Red	Did not qualify (DNQ)
Red	Did not pre-qualify (DNPQ)
Black	Disqualified (DSQ)
White	Did not start (DNS)
White	Withdrew (WD)
White	Race cancelled (C)
Blank	Did not practice (DNP)
Blank	Did not arrive (DNA)
Blank	Excluded (EX)

=== Teams' championship ===
Pos.	Team	No.	FRA (France)		GER (Germany)		HUN (Hungary)		ESP (Spain)		PRT (Portugal)		ITA (Italy)		AGE (Alsace)		BHR (Bahrain)		SAU (Saudi Arabia)		Pts.
1	(Italy) BRC Hyundai N Squadra Corse	5	9	Ret	C	C	12	4	5	Ret	4	5	4^{4}	4	4	4	2^{4}	1	2^{4}	4	559
1	(Italy) BRC Hyundai N Squadra Corse	96	6^{4}	1	C^{5}	C	1	8	3	1	8	3	2^{2}	3	3^{3}	3	1^{1}	4	6^{2}	3	559
2	(Germany) ALL-INKL.COM Münnich Motorsport	29	1^{1}	7	C	C	7^{4}	3	12	12	3	9	1^{1}	5	2^{1}	7	4^{3}	9	10	8	403
2	(Germany) ALL-INKL.COM Münnich Motorsport	86	2^{2}	5	C	C	9^{5}	10	11	11	Ret	Ret	7^{3}	10	10^{4}	10	8	2	11	11	403
3	(Belgium) Comtoyou DHL Team Audi Sport	17	16^{3}	4	C	C	3^{3}	12	4^{2}	8	10	Ret	9	2	1^{2}	8	3^{2}	5	1^{1}	Ret	355
3	(Belgium) Comtoyou DHL Team Audi Sport	33	11	12	C	C	15	13	Ret	Ret	13	12	6	7	6	11	6	6	3^{5}	6	355
4	(Belgium) Comtoyou Team Audi Sport	16	8^{5}	Ret	C^{2}	C	4^{1}	7	1^{1}	14	Ret	13	3	1	7^{5}	5	Ret	Ret	5^{3}	1	338
4	(Belgium) Comtoyou Team Audi Sport	25	10	Ret	C^{1}	C	13	Ret	10	9	7	6	10	9	11	2	7	8			338
4	(Belgium) Comtoyou Team Audi Sport	72																	4	Ret	338
5	(Hungary) Zengő Motorsport	66															13	11			284
5	(Hungary) Zengő Motorsport	79	12	8	C	C	6	2	2^{3}	2	6	1	8	6	5	1			9	5	284
5	(Hungary) Zengő Motorsport	99	13	11	C	C	17	Ret	Ret	4	12	Ret			8	12	11	10	Ret	7	284
6	(Sweden) Cyan Performance Lynk & Co	11 (Note: Santiago Urrutia was ineligible to score points for the teams' championship in round 1, whereas Thed Björk was ineligible in rounds 2–6.)	Ret	9	C	C	11	11	9	10	Ret	11	DNS	DNS							211
6	(Sweden) Cyan Performance Lynk & Co	12	7	2	C^{3}	C	8	1	8	3	1	10	DNS	DNS							211
6	(Sweden) Cyan Performance Lynk & Co	55	5	3	C	C	5	5	13	6	5	6	DNS	DNS							211
7	(Sweden) Cyan Racing Lynk & Co	68	4	15	C^{4}	C	2^{2}	6	6^{4}	5	2	8	DNS	DNS							211
7	(Sweden) Cyan Racing Lynk & Co	100	3	6	C	C	10	9	7^{5}	7	14	4	DNS	DNS							211
8	(Germany) Liqui Moly Team Engstler	9	17	13	C	C	14	14	Ret	13	9	2	5^{5}	8	Ret	9	9^{6}	Ret	14	Ret	153
8	(Germany) Liqui Moly Team Engstler	18	15	10	C	C	16	15	14	15	11	Ret	11	11	9	6	12	12	13	9	153
Ineligible for team points
—	(Belgium) Comtoyou Racing	24																	12	10	—
—	(Belgium) Comtoyou Racing	72															14	7			—
—	(Belgium) Comtoyou Racing	110															10	13	8	2	—
—	(Belgium) Comtoyou Team Audi Sport	64	14	14																	—
—	(Italy) BRC Hyundai N Racing Team	88															5^{5}	3	7	Ret	—
Pos.	Team	No.	FRA (France)		GER (Germany)		HUN (Hungary)		ESP (Spain)		PRT (Portugal)		ITA (Italy)		AGE (Alsace)		BHR (Bahrain)		SAU (Saudi Arabia)		Pts.

Colour	Result
Gold	Winner
Silver	Second place
Bronze	Third place
Green	Points classification
Blue	Non-points classification
Blue	Non-classified finish (NC)
Purple	Retired, not classified (Ret)
Red	Did not qualify (DNQ)
Red	Did not pre-qualify (DNPQ)
Black	Disqualified (DSQ)
White	Did not start (DNS)
White	Withdrew (WD)
White	Race cancelled (C)
Blank	Did not practice (DNP)
Blank	Did not arrive (DNA)
Blank	Excluded (EX)

=== WTCR Trophy ===
Eligible for drivers racing without manufacturer support.

Pos.	Driver	FRA (France)		GER (Germany)		HUN (Hungary)		ESP (Spain)		PRT (Portugal)		ITA (Italy)		AGE (Alsace)		BHR (Bahrain)		SAU (Saudi Arabia)		Pts.
1	(United Kingdom) Robert Huff	12^{1}	8	C	C	6^{1}	2	2^{1}	2	6	1	8	6	6	1			9	5	139
2	(Netherlands) Tom Coronel	11	12	C	C	15	13	Ret	Ret	13	12	6	7	7^{1}	11	6	6	3^{1}	6	108
3	(Morocco) Mehdi Bennani	10	Ret	C^{1}	C	13	Ret	10	9	7^{1}	6	10^{1}	9	11	2	7^{1}	8			91
4	(Hungary) Dániel Nagy	13	11	C	C	17	Ret	Ret	4	12	Ret			8	12	11	10	Ret	7	51
5	(Argentina) Franco Girolami																	4	Ret	8
6	(Hungary) Bence Boldizs															13	11			7
Pos.	Driver	FRA (France)		GER (Germany)		HUN (Hungary)		ESP (Spain)		PRT (Portugal)		ITA (Italy)		AGE (Alsace)		BHR (Bahrain)		SAU (Saudi Arabia)		Pts.
