= Gilles Magnus =

Belgian racing driver (born 1999)

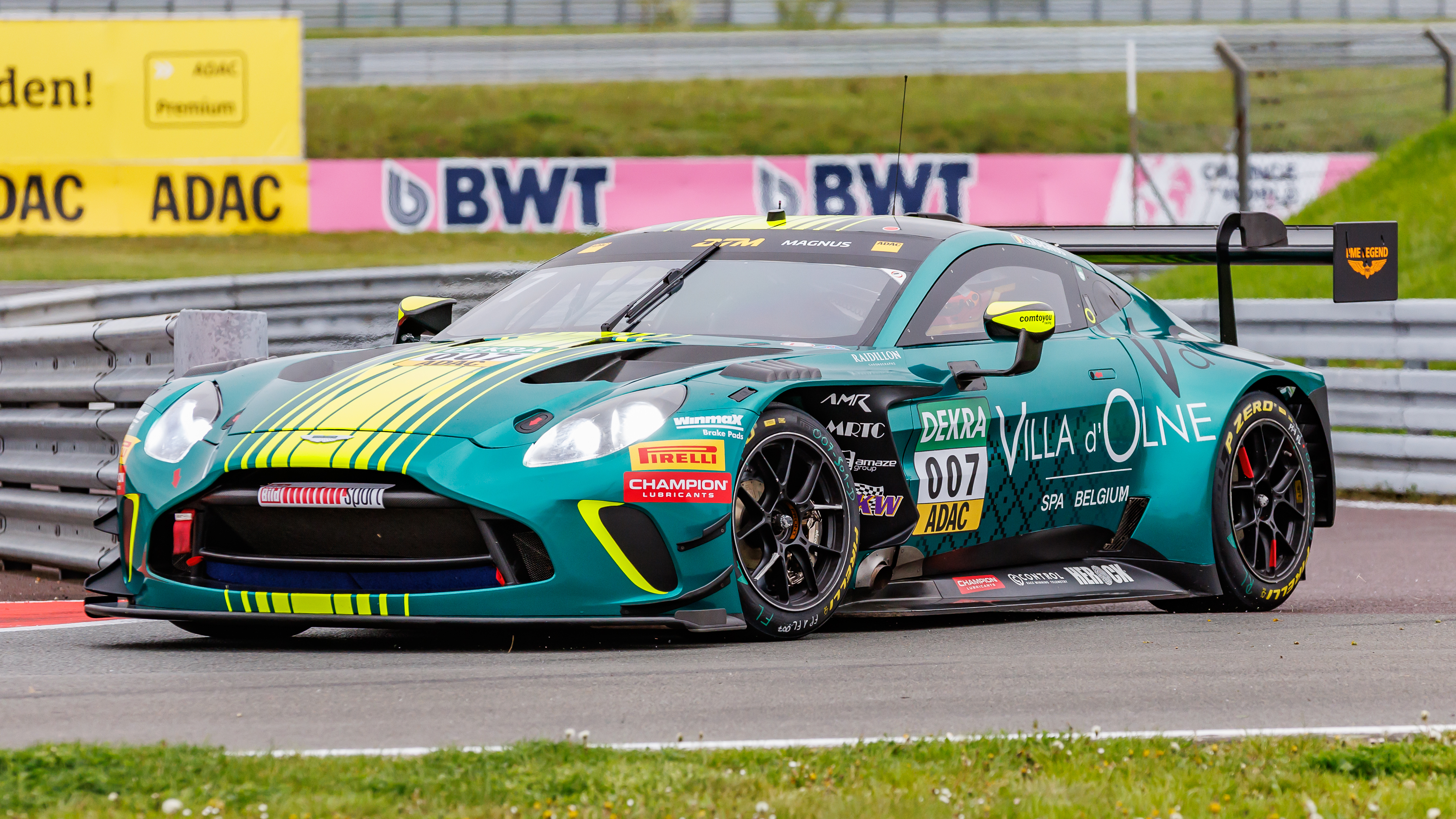
- Magnus at Motorsport Arena Oschersleben in 2025
- Nationality: (Belgium) Belgian
- Born: Gilles Philip Myriam Magnus; 30 August 1999 (age 27) Antwerp, Belgium

World Touring Car Cup career
- Debut season: 2020
- Current team: Comtoyou Racing
- Categorisation: FIA Silver (until 2023); FIA Gold (2024–)
- Car number: 16
- Starts: 48
- Wins: 4
- Poles: 2
- Fastest laps: 4
- Best finish: 5th in 2020, 2022

Previous series
- 2016 2017 2019: Formula Renault 2.0 Northern European Cup; French F4 Championship; TCR Europe Touring Car Series

Championship titles
- 2020 2021: WTCR Rookies' championship WTCR Trophy
Medal record
Touring Car Racing
Representing Belgium
FIA Motorsport Games
Silver medal – second place	2019 Rome	Touring Car Cup

Gilles Philip Myriam Magnus (born 30 August 1999) is a Belgian racing driver currently competing in the GT World Challenge Europe Sprint Cup. He previously competed in the World Touring Car Cup from 2020 to 2022. He has also been a factory driver for Audi Sport. He is the winner of the 2024 Dubai 24 Hour race.

== Career ==
=== Karting ===
Magnus began karting at the age of eight, claiming numerous titles in his career.

=== Lower formulae ===
In 2016, Magnus progressed to single-seaters in the French F4 Championship. There he claimed a victory, a fastest lap and accumulated numerous podiums to finish second behind champion Yifei Ye.

=== Formula Renault ===
In October 2016, Magnus partook in the rookie test at Estoril. In February 2017, he was signed by R-ace GP for the NEC Championship, where he finished second in the championship, having lost the title by two points behind Michaël Benyahia.

=== FIA Motorsport Games ===
Magnus won the silver medal at the 2019 FIA Motorsport Games Touring Car Cup representing Team Belgium.

== Racing record ==
=== Career summary ===
Season	Series	Team	Races	Wins	Poles	F/Laps	Podiums	Points	Position
2016	French F4 Championship	FFSA Academy	20	1	0	1	13	278	**2nd**
2016	V de V Challenge Monoplace	Zig Zag	6	0	0	0	1	0	NC†
2017	Formula Renault NEC	R-ace GP	11	0	2	2	1	161	**2nd**
2017	Formula Renault Eurocup	R-ace GP	3	0	0	0	0	0	NC†
2017	V de V Challenge Monoplace	R-ace GP	3	2	2	3	2	91	33rd
2018	Blancpain GT Series Sprint Cup	Belgian Audi Club Team WRT	2	0	0	0	0	7.5	20th
2018	Blancpain GT Series Sprint Cup - Silver	Belgian Audi Club Team WRT	2	2	2	1	2	35	8th
2018	GT4 European Series - Silver	Selleslagh Racing Team	2	0	0	0	0	1	NC†
2019	TCR Europe Touring Car Series	Comtoyou Racing	14	1	1	1	3	202	6th
2019	FIA Motorsport Games Touring Car Cup	Team Belgium	2	1	1	0	2	45	**2nd**
2019	24H TCE Series - TCR	AC Motorsport	1	0	0	0	0	0	NC
2020	World Touring Car Cup	Comtoyou Racing	16	0	1	1	4	172	5th
2020	24H TCE Series - TCR	AC Motorsport	1	1	0	0	1	30	12th
2020	Le Mans Cup - LMP3	Mühlner Motorsport	3	0	0	1	0	4	27th
2021	World Touring Car Cup	Comtoyou Team Audi Sport	16	1	0	0	4	139	10th
2022	World Touring Car Cup	Comtoyou Team Audi Sport	16	3	1	3	4	210	5th
2022	GT World Challenge Europe Sprint Cup	Comtoyou Racing with Saintéloc	8	0	0	0	0	5.5	18th
2022	GT World Challenge Europe Sprint Cup - Silver	Comtoyou Racing with Saintéloc	8	1	1	1	1	56.5	6th
2022	GT World Challenge Europe Endurance Cup	Saintéloc Racing	1	0	0	0	0	0	NC
2022	Intercontinental GT Challenge	Saintéloc Junior Team	1	0	0	0	0	0	NC
2022	FIA Motorsport Games Touring Car Cup	Team Belgium	1	0	1	0	0	N/A	DNF
2023	GT World Challenge Europe Sprint Cup	Comtoyou Racing	10	0	0	0	0	1	21st
2023	GT World Challenge Europe Sprint Cup - Gold	Comtoyou Racing	10	1	4	0	7	98	**3rd**
2023	GT World Challenge Europe Endurance Cup	Comtoyou Racing	5	0	0	0	0	4	24th
2023	GT World Challenge Europe Endurance Cup - Gold	Comtoyou Racing	1	0	0	0	0	10	12th
2023	Porsche Carrera Cup Benelux	August by NGT	2	0	0	0	0	22	21st
2023	24 Hours of Nürburgring - SP9	Audi Sport Team Car Collection	1	0	0	0	0	N/A	13th
2023–24	Asian Le Mans Series - GT	Saintéloc Junior Team	5	1	1	0	2	57	4th
2023–24	Middle East Trophy - GT3	Eastalent Racing Team	1	1	0	0	1	?	?
2024	GT World Challenge Europe Endurance Cup	Saintéloc Racing	5	0	0	0	0	0	NC
2024	GT World Challenge Europe Sprint Cup	Saintéloc Racing	10	0	0	0	0	1.5	20th
2024	GT World Challenge Europe Sprint Cup - Gold	Saintéloc Racing	10	2	1	4	7	101.5	**2nd**
2024	Gulf 12 Hours	Saintéloc Racing	1	1	0	0	1	N/A	**1st**
2025	Deutsche Tourenwagen Masters	Comtoyou Racing	16	0	1	0	0	35	20th
2025	GT World Challenge Europe Endurance Cup	Saintéloc Racing	4	0	0	0	0	0	NC
2025	GT World Challenge Europe Sprint Cup	Saintéloc Racing	10	0	0	0	0	11.5	15th
2025	GT World Challenge Europe Sprint Cup - Gold	Saintéloc Racing	10	2	2	2	5	101.5	**3rd**
2026	GT World Challenge Europe Endurance Cup	Boutsen VDS	5	0	0	0	0	4	30th
2026	GT World Challenge Europe Sprint Cup	Boutsen VDS	9	0	0	0	0	3	27th
2026	GT World Challenge Europe Sprint Cup - Gold	Boutsen VDS	9	1	2	0	2	66.5	6th

^{†} As Magnus was a guest driver, he was ineligible to score points. ^{*} Season still in progress.

=== Complete French F4 Championship results ===
(key) (Races in bold indicate pole position) (Races in italics indicate fastest lap)

Year	1	2	3	4	5	6	7	8	9	10	11	12	13	14	15	16	17	18	19	20	21	22	23	Pos	Points
2016	LEC; 1; 16	LEC; 2; 6	LEC; 3; 6	LEC; 4; 7	PAU; 1; 5	PAU; 2; 2	PAU; 3; 2	PAU; 4; 3	LÉD; 1; 2	LÉD; 2; 4	LÉD; 3; 3	LÉD; 4; 3	MAG; 1; 3	MAG; 2; 2	MAG; 3; 3	MAG; 4; 2	LMS; 1; 2	LMS; 2; 8	LMS; 3; 1	LMS; 4; 2	CAT; 1	CAT; 2	CAT; 3	2nd	278

=== Complete Formula Renault Eurocup results ===
(key) (Races in bold indicate pole position) (Races in italics indicate fastest lap)

Year	Team	1	2	3	4	5	6	7	8	9	10	11	12	13	14	15	16	17	18	19	20	21	22	23	Pos	Points
2017	R-ace GP	MNZ; 1	MNZ; 2	SIL; 1	SIL; 2	PAU; 1	PAU; 2	MON; 1	MON; 2	HUN; 1	HUN; 2	HUN; 3	NÜR; 1	NÜR; 2	RBR; 1	RBR; 2	LEC; 1	LEC; 2	SPA; 1; 14	SPA; 2 Ret	SPA; 3; 18	CAT; 1	CAT; 2	CAT; 3	NC†	0

† As Magnus was a guest driver, he was ineligible for points

=== Complete Formula Renault NEC results ===
(key) (Races in bold indicate pole position) (Races in italics indicate fastest lap)

Year	Entrant	1	2	3	4	5	6	7	8	9	10	11	DC	Points
2017	R-ace GP	MNZ; 1; 5	MNZ; 2; 4	**ASS**; **1**; 7	**ASS**; **2**; 2	NÜR; 1; 8	NÜR; 2; 6	SPA; 1; 14	SPA; 2 Ret	SPA; 3; 18	HOC; 1; 15	HOC; 2; 10	2nd	161

=== Complete GT World Challenge Europe results ===
==== GT World Challenge Europe Sprint Cup ====
(key) (Races in bold indicate pole position) (Races in italics indicate fastest lap)

Year	Team	Car	Class	1	2	3	4	5	6	7	8	9	10	Pos.	Points
2018	Belgian Audi Club Team WRT	Audi R8 LMS	Silver	**ZOL**; **1**; 7	**ZOL**; **2**; 6	BRH; 1	BRH; 2	MIS; 1	MIS; 2	HUN; 1	HUN; 2	NÜR; 1	NÜR; 2	8th	35
2022	Comtoyou Racing with Saintéloc	Audi R8 LMS Evo II	Silver	BRH; 1; 11	BRH; 2; 18	**MAG**; **1**; 6	MAG; 2; 16	ZAN; 1; 19	ZAN; 2; 11	MIS; 1	MIS; 2	VAL; 1; 12	VAL; 2; 9	6th	56.5
2023	Comtoyou Racing	Audi R8 LMS Evo II	Gold	BRH; 1; 17	**BRH**; **2**; 9	**MIS**; **1** Ret	MIS; 2; 19	**HOC**; **1**; 26	HOC; 2; 15	VAL; 1; 14	VAL; 2; 14	**ZAN**; **1**; 14	ZAN; 2; 11	3rd	98
2024	Saintéloc Racing	Audi R8 LMS Evo II	Gold	BRH; 1; 13	**BRH**; **2**; 8	MIS; 1; 13	MIS; 2; 13	HOC; 1; 10	HOC; 2; 16	MAG; 1; 14	MAG; 2; 11	CAT; 1; 17	CAT; 2; 13	2nd	101.5
2025	Saintéloc Racing	Audi R8 LMS Evo II	Gold	BRH; 1; 18	BRH; 2; 26	**ZAN**; **1**; 4	ZAN; 2; 19	MIS; 1; 12	**MIS**; **2**; 8	MAG; 1; 18	MAG; 2; 8	VAL; 1; 23	VAL; 2; 14	3rd	101.5
2026	Boutsen VDS	Porsche 911 GT3 R (992.2)	Gold	BRH; 1 Ret	**BRH**; **2** DNS	MIS; 1; 17	MIS; 2; 19	**MAG**; **1**; 8	MAG; 2; 24	ZAN; 1; 11	ZAN; 2; 10	CAT; 1; 19	CAT; 2; 28	6th	66.5

==== GT World Challenge Europe Endurance Cup ====
(key) (Races in bold indicate pole position) (Races in italics indicate fastest lap)

Year	Team	Car	Class	1	2	3	4	5	6	7	Pos.	Points
2022	Saintéloc Junior Team	Audi R8 LMS Evo II	Silver	IMO	LEC	SPA; 6H; Ret	SPA; 12H; Ret	SPA; 24H; Ret	HOC	CAT	NC	0
2023	Comtoyou Racing	Audi R8 LMS Evo II	Pro	MNZ; Ret	LEC; 42	SPA; 6H; 18	SPA; 12H; 16	SPA; 24H; 8		CAT; 49	24th	4
2023	Comtoyou Racing	Audi R8 LMS Evo II	Gold						NÜR; 21		12th	10
2024	Saintéloc Racing	Audi R8 LMS Evo II	Gold	LEC; 13	SPA; 6H; 37	SPA; 12H; 21	SPA; 24H; 15	**NÜR**; 15	MNZ; 26	JED; 18	1st	140
2025	Saintéloc Racing	Audi R8 LMS Evo II	Bronze	LEC; 37	MNZ; 27	SPA; 6H; 41	SPA; 12H; 24	SPA; 24H; 19	NÜR; 37	CAT; Ret	5th	48
2026	Boutsen VDS	Porsche 911 GT3 R (992.2)	Gold	LEC; Ret	MNZ; Ret	SPA; 6H; 17	SPA; 12H; 16	SPA; 24H; 22	NÜR; 8	ALG; Ret	7th	48

=== Complete TCR Europe Touring Car Series results ===
(key) (Races in bold indicate pole position) (Races in italics indicate fastest lap)

Year	Team	Car	1	2	3	4	5	6	7	8	9	10	11	12	13	14	DC	Points
2019	Comtoyou Racing	Audi RS 3 LMS TCR	HUN; 1; 6	HUN; 2; 2	HOC; 1; 8	HOC; 2; 9	**SPA**; **1**; 1	SPA; 2; 26†	RBR; 1; 17	RBR; 2 Ret	OSC; 1 Ret	OSC; 2; 10	CAT; 1 Ret	CAT; 2; 2	MNZ; 1; 6	MNZ; 2; 20	6th	202

^{†} Driver did not finish the race, but was classified as he completed over 90% of the race distance.

=== Complete FIA Motorsport Games results ===
Year	Entrant	Cup	Race 1	Race 2	Points	Position
2019	Team Belgium	Touring Car	3rd	1st	45	**2nd**

=== Complete World Touring Car Cup results ===
(key) (Races in bold indicate pole position) (Races in italics indicate fastest lap)

Year	Team	Car	1	2	3	4	5	6	7	8	9	10	11	12	13	14	15	16	17	18	DC	Points
2020	Comtoyou Racing	Audi RS 3 LMS TCR	BEL; 1; 10	BEL; 2; 4	GER; 1; 7	GER; 2 Ret	SVK; 1; 7	SVK; 2; 2	SVK; 3; 3	HUN; 1; 15	HUN; 2; 10	HUN; 3; 14	ESP; 1; 3	ESP; 2; 8	**ESP**; **3**; 5	ARA; 1; 3	ARA; 2; 4	ARA; 3; 9			5th	172
2021	Comtoyou Team Audi Sport	Audi RS 3 LMS TCR	GER; 1; 14	GER; 2; 9	POR; 1; 8	POR; 2; 14	ESP; 1; 6	ESP; 2; 3	**HUN**; **1**; 1	HUN; 2; 9	CZE; 1 Ret	CZE; 2; 9	FRA; 1; 14	FRA; 2; 17	ITA; 1; 7	ITA; 2; 3	**RUS**; **1**; 3	RUS; 2 Ret			10th	139
2022	Comtoyou Team Audi Sport	Audi RS 3 LMS TCR	FRA; 1; 8	FRA; 2 Ret	GER; 1 C	GER; 2 C	HUN; 1; 4	HUN; 2; 7	**ESP**; **1**; 1	ESP; 2; 14	POR; 1 Ret	POR; 2; 13	ITA; 1; 3	ITA; 2; 1	ALS; 1; 7	ALS; 2; 5	BHR; 1 Ret	BHR; 2 Ret	SAU; 1; 5	SAU; 2; 1	5th	210

=== Complete Asian Le Mans Series results ===
(key) (Races in bold indicate pole position) (Races in italics indicate fastest lap)

Year	Team	Class	Car	Engine	1	2	3	4	5	Pos.	Points
2023–24	Saintéloc Racing	GT	Audi R8 LMS Evo II	Audi DAR 5.2 L V10	**SEP**; **1**; 1	SEP; 2; 2	DUB; 1 Ret	ABU; 1; 10	ABU; 2; 4	4th	57

=== Complete Deutsche Tourenwagen Masters results ===
(key) (Races in bold indicate pole position) (Races in italics indicate fastest lap)

Year	Team	Car	1	2	3	4	5	6	7	8	9	10	11	12	13	14	15	16	Pos	Points
2025	Comtoyou Racing	Aston Martin Vantage AMR GT3 Evo	OSC; 1 DSQ	OSC; 2; 21	LAU; 1; 18	LAU; 2; 16	ZAN; 1 Ret	ZAN; 2; 19	NOR; 1; 12	NOR; 2 Ret	NÜR; 1; 16	NÜR; 2; 7^{3}	SAC; 1; 18	SAC; 2; 9	RBR; 1; 9^{3}	RBR; 2; 18	HOC; 1; 13	**HOC**; **2**; 20^{1}	20th	35

Sporting positions
Preceded by Inaugural	World Touring Car Cup; Rookie Champion; 2020	Succeeded by Luca Engstler
Preceded by Jean-Karl Vernay	WTCR Trophy; Champion; 2021	Succeeded by Robert Huff
