= Dániel Nagy =

Dániel Nagy may refer to:

- Dániel Nagy (footballer, born 1984), Hungarian footballer
- Dániel Nagy (footballer, born 1991), Hungarian footballer
- Dániel Nagy (racing driver) (born 1998), Hungarian racing driver
