= 2018 FIA WTCR Race of Hungary =

Race details
- Round 2 of 10 in the 2018 World Touring Car Cup
Date	7–8 April 2018
Official name	FIA WTCR Race of Hungary
Location	Hungaroring, Mogyoród, Hungary
Distance	Race One; 12 laps / 52.572 km (32.667 mi)
Distance	Race Two; 12 laps / 52.572 km (32.667 mi)
Distance	Race Three; 17 laps / 65.715 km (40.833 mi)
- Race 1

Pole
Driver	(Hungary) Norbert Michelisz	(Italy) BRC Racing Team
Time	1:52.644

Fastest lap
Driver	(Argentina) Esteban Guerrieri	(Germany) ALL-INKL.COM Münnich Motorsport
Time	1 54.691

Podium
First	(France) Yann Ehrlacher	(Germany) ALL-INKL.COM Münnich Motorsport
Second	(Argentina) Esteban Guerrieri	(Germany) ALL-INKL.COM Münnich Motorsport
Third	(Hungary) Norbert Michelisz	(Italy) BRC Racing Team
- Race 2

Fastest lap
Driver	(Hungary) Dániel Nagy	(Hungary) M1RA
Time	1:54.787

Podium
First	(United Kingdom) Robert Huff	(France) Sébastien Loeb Racing
Second	(Hungary) Dániel Nagy	(Hungary) M1RA
Third	(France) Yvan Muller	(France) M Racing-YMR
- Race 3

Pole
Driver	(Hungary) Norbert Michelisz	(Italy) BRC Racing Team
- Time 1:52.365

Fastest lap
Driver	(France) Yann Ehrlacher	(Germany) ALL-INKL.COM Münnich Motorsport
Time	1:54.129

Podium
First	(Italy) Gabriele Tarquini	(Italy) BRC Racing Team
Second	(Hungary) Norbert Michelisz	(Italy) BRC Racing Team
Third	(France) Yvan Muller	(France) M Racing-YMR

The 2018 FIA WTCR Race of Hungary was the second round of the 2018 World Touring Car Cup and the first running of the FIA WTCR Race of Hungary. It was held on 28 and 29 April 2018 at the Hungaroring in Mogyoród, Hungary. The first and third races were won by Gabriele Tarquini and the second won by Jean-Karl Vernay.

== Entry list ==
A total of 25 cars were entered, along with two Hungarian wildcard entries; Attila Tassi and Daniel Nagy. The following teams and drivers were entered into the event:

Team	Car	No.	Drivers
(Italy) BRC Racing Team	Hyundai i30 N TCR	5	(Hungary) Norbert Michelisz
(Belgium) DG Sport Compétition	Peugeot 308 GTi TCR	7	(France) Aurélien Comte
(Hungary) Zengő Motorsport	CUPRA León TCR	8	(Hungary) Norbert Nagy
(Belgium) Boutsen Ginion Racing	Honda Civic Type R TCR (FK8)	9	(Netherlands) Tom Coronel
(Italy) Team Mulsanne	Alfa Romeo Giulietta TCR	10	(Italy) Gianni Morbidelli
(France) M Racing-YMR	Hyundai i30 N TCR	11	(Sweden) Thed Björk
(France) Sébastien Loeb Racing	Volkswagen Golf GTI TCR	12	(United Kingdom) Robert Huff
(Germany) ALL-INKL.COM Münnich Motorsport	Honda Civic Type R TCR (FK8)	15	(United Kingdom) James Thompson
(Hong Kong) KCMG	Honda Civic Type R TCR (FK8)	19	(Hungary) Attila Tassi
(Belgium) Audi Sport Team Comtoyou	Audi RS 3 LMS TCR	20	(Belgium) Denis Dupont
(Belgium) Comtoyou Racing	Audi RS 3 LMS TCR	21	(France) Aurélien Panis
(Belgium) Audi Sport Team Comtoyou	Audi RS 3 LMS TCR	22	(Belgium) Frédéric Vervisch
(Belgium) Comtoyou Racing	Audi RS 3 LMS TCR	23	(France) Nathanaël Berthon
(France) Sébastien Loeb Racing	Volkswagen Golf GTI TCR	25	(Morocco) Mehdi Bennani
(Spain) Team Oscaro by Campos Racing	CUPRA León TCR	27	(France) John Filippi
(Italy) BRC Racing Team	Hyundai i30 N TCR	30	(Italy) Gabriele Tarquini
(France) M Racing-YMR	Hyundai i30 N TCR	48	(France) Yvan Muller
(Luxembourg) Audi Sport Leopard Lukoil Team WRT	Audi RS 3 LMS TCR	52	(United Kingdom) Gordon Shedden
(Belgium) Boutsen Ginion Racing	Honda Civic Type R TCR (FK8)	63	(Belgium) Benjamin Lessennes
(Hungary) Zengő Motorsport	CUPRA León TCR	66	(Hungary) Zsolt Szabó
(Germany) ALL-INKL.COM Münnich Motorsport	Honda Civic Type R TCR (FK8)	68	(France) Yann Ehrlacher
(Luxembourg) Audi Sport Leopard Lukoil Team WRT	Audi RS 3 LMS TCR	69	(France) Jean-Karl Vernay
(Belgium) DG Sport Compétition	Peugeot 308 GTi TCR	70	(Slovakia) Mat'o Homola
(Spain) Team Oscaro by Campos Racing	CUPRA León TCR	74	(Spain) Pepe Oriola
(Germany) ALL-INKL.COM Münnich Motorsport	Honda Civic Type R TCR (FK8)	86	(Argentina) Esteban Guerrieri
(Italy) Team Mulsanne	Alfa Romeo Giulietta TCR	88	(Italy) Fabrizio Giovanardi
(Hungary) M1RA	Hyundai i30 N TCR	99	(Hungary) Dániel Nagy

== Results ==
=== Qualifying 1 ===
Pos.	No.	Name	Team	Car	Time
1	5	(Hungary) Norbert Michelisz	BRC Racing Team	Hyundai i30 N TCR	1:52.644
2	86	(Argentina) Esteban Guerrieri	ALL-INKL.COM Münnich Motorsport	Honda Civic Type R TCR (FK8)	1:52.900
3	11	(Sweden) Thed Björk	M Racing-YMR	Hyundai i30 N TCR	1:53.063
4	30	(Italy) Gabriele Tarquini	BRC Racing Team	Hyundai i30 N TCR	1:53.088
5	63	(Belgium) Benjamin Lessennes	Boutsen Ginion Racing	Honda Civic Type R TCR (FK8)	1:53.152
6	15	(France) Yann Ehrlacher	ALL-INKL.COM Münnich Motorsport	Honda Civic Type R TCR (FK8)	1:53.213
7	48	(France) Yvan Muller	M Racing-YMR	Hyundai i30 N TCR	1:53.315
8	99	(Hungary) Dániel Nagy	M1RA	Hyundai i30 N TCR	1:53.487
9	12	(United Kingdom) Robert Huff	Sébastien Loeb Racing	Volkswagen Golf GTI TCR	1:53.601
10	15	(United Kingdom) James Thompson	ALL-INKL.COM Münnich Motorsport	Honda Civic Type R TCR (FK8)	1:53.736
11	69	(France) Jean-Karl Vernay	Audi Sport Leopard Lukoil Team WRT	Audi RS 3 LMS TCR	1:53.900
12	9	(Netherlands) Tom Coronel	Boutsen Ginion Racing	Honda Civic Type R TCR (FK8)	1:54.144
13	23	(France) Nathanaël Berthon	Comtoyou Racing	Audi RS 3 LMS TCR	1:54.174
14	25	(Morocco) Mehdi Bennani	Sébastien Loeb Racing	Volkswagen Golf GTI TCR	1:54.319
15	70	(Slovakia) Mat'o Homola	DG Sport Compétition	Peugeot 308 GTi TCR	1:54.379
16	27	(France) John Filippi	Team Oscaro by Campos Racing	CUPRA León TCR	1:54.387
17	8	(Hungary) Norbert Nagy	Zengő Motorsport	CUPRA León TCR	1:54.474
18	88	(Italy) Fabrizio Giovanardi	Team Mulsanne	Alfa Romeo Giulietta TCR	1:54.476
19	7	(France) Aurélien Comte	DG Sport Compétition	Peugeot 308 GTi TCR	1:54.573
20	10	(Italy) Gianni Morbidelli	Team Mulsanne	Alfa Romeo Giulietta TCR	1:54.596
21	19	(Hungary) Attila Tassi	KCMG	Honda Civic Type R TCR (FK8)	1:54.749
22	74	(Spain) Pepe Oriola	Team Oscaro by Campos Racing	CUPRA León TCR	1:54.900
23	21	(France) Aurélien Panis	Comtoyou Racing	Audi RS 3 LMS TCR	1:55.017
24	22	(Belgium) Frédéric Vervisch	Audi Sport Team Comtoyou	Audi RS 3 LMS TCR	1:55.101
25	52	(United Kingdom) Gordon Shedden	Audi Sport Leopard Lukoil Team WRT	Audi RS 3 LMS TCR	1:55.323
26	20	(Belgium) Denis Dupont	Audi Sport Team Comtoyou	Audi RS 3 LMS TCR	1:55.524
27	66	(Hungary) Zsolt Szabó	Zengő Motorsport	CUPRA León TCR	1:55.703

=== Race 1 ===
Pos.	No.	Name	Team	Car	Laps	Time/Retired	Grid	Points
1	68	(France) Yann Ehrlacher	ALL-INKL.COM Münnich Motorsport	Honda Civic Type R TCR (FK8)	12	23:08.602	6	27
2	86	(Argentina) Esteban Guerrieri	ALL-INKL.COM Münnich Motorsport	Honda Civic Type R TCR (FK8)	12	+0.692	2	20
3	5	(Hungary) Norbert Michelisz	BRC Racing Team	Hyundai i30 N TCR	12	+5.942	1	17
4	48	(France) Yvan Muller	M Racing-YMR	Hyundai i30 N TCR	12	+7.290	7	14
5	12	(United Kingdom) Robert Huff	Sébastien Loeb Racing	Volkswagen Golf GTI TCR	12	+9.117	9	12
6	5	(Hungary) Norbert Michelisz	BRC Racing Team	Hyundai i30 N TCR	12	+0.856	1	10
7	99	(Hungary) Dániel Nagy	M1RA	Hyundai i30 N TCR	12	+11.096	8	8
8	69	(France) Jean-Karl Vernay	Audi Sport Leopard Lukoil Team WRT	Audi RS 3 LMS TCR	12	+15.403	11	6
9	11	(Sweden) Thed Björk	M Racing-YMR	Hyundai i30 N TCR	12	+16.202	3	4
10	25	(Morocco) Mehdi Bennani	Sébastien Loeb Racing	Volkswagen Golf GTI TCR	12	+6.631	7	2
11	23	(France) Nathanaël Berthon	Comtoyou Racing	Audi RS 3 LMS TCR	12	+22.455	13	
12	15	(United Kingdom) James Thompson	ALL-INKL.COM Münnich Motorsport	Honda Civic Type R TCR (FK8)	12	+25.448	10	
13	22	(Belgium) Frédéric Vervisch	Audi Sport Team Comtoyou	Audi RS 3 LMS TCR	12	+25.801	24	
14	63	(Belgium) Benjamin Lessennes	Boutsen Ginion Racing	Honda Civic Type R TCR (FK8)	12	+26.901	5	
15	21	(France) Aurélien Panis	Comtoyou Racing	Audi RS 3 LMS TCR	12	+27.850	23	
16	74	(Spain) Pepe Oriola	Team Oscaro by Campos Racing	CUPRA León TCR	12	+32.592	22	
17	7	(France) Aurélien Comte	DG Sport Compétition	Peugeot 308 GTi TCR	12	+33.231	19	
18	52	(United Kingdom) Gordon Shedden	Audi Sport Leopard Lukoil Team WRT	Audi RS 3 LMS TCR	12	+33.978	25	
19	19	(Hungary) Attila Tassi	KCMG	Honda Civic Type R TCR (FK8)	12	+34.344	21	
20	70	(Slovakia) Mat'o Homola	DG Sport Compétition	Peugeot 308 GTi TCR	12	+34.671	15	
21	66	(Hungary) Zsolt Szabó	Zengő Motorsport	CUPRA León TCR	12	+46.586	27	
22	20	(Belgium) Denis Dupont	Audi Sport Team Comtoyou	Audi RS 3 LMS TCR	12	+46.738	26	
23	88	(Italy) Fabrizio Giovanardi	Team Mulsanne	Alfa Romeo Giulietta TCR	9	+3 Laps	18	
Ret	27	(France) John Filippi	Team Oscaro by Campos Racing	CUPRA León TCR	6	Retired	16	
Ret	10	(Italy) Gianni Morbidelli	Team Mulsanne	Alfa Romeo Giulietta TCR	5	Retired	20	
Ret	9	(Netherlands) Tom Coronel	Boutsen Ginion Racing	Honda Civic Type R TCR (FK8)	2	Retired	12	
Ret	8	(Hungary) Norbert Nagy	Zengő Motorsport	CUPRA León TCR	1	Retired	17	

=== Qualifying 2 ===
Pos.	No.	Name	Team	Car	Q1	Q2	Q3	Points
1	5	(Hungary) Norbert Michelisz	BRC Racing Team	Hyundai i30 N TCR	1:53.017	1:52.176	1:52.365	5
2	5	(Italy) Gabriele Tarquini	BRC Racing Team	Hyundai i30 N TCR	1:53.014	1:52.382	1:52.807	4
3	68	(Argentina) Esteban Guerrieri	ALL-INKL.COM Münnich Motorsport	Honda Civic Type R TCR (FK8)	1:52.967	1:52.792	1:53.023	3
4	68	(France) Yann Ehrlacher	ALL-INKL.COM Münnich Motorsport	Honda Civic Type R TCR (FK8)	1:53.246	1:52.917	1:53.366	2
5	63	(Belgium) Benjamin Lessennes	Boutsen Ginion Racing	Honda Civic Type R TCR (FK8)	1:53.087	1:52.964	–	1
6	48	(France) Yvan Muller	M Racing-YMR	Hyundai i30 N TCR	1:52.780	1:53.225	–	
7	15	(United Kingdom) James Thompson	ALL-INKL.COM Münnich Motorsport	Honda Civic Type R TCR (FK8)	1:53.625	1:53.415	–	
8	25	(Morocco) Mehdi Bennani	Sébastien Loeb Racing	Volkswagen Golf GTI TCR	1:53.358	1:53.610	–	
9	99	(Hungary) Dániel Nagy	M1RA	Hyundai i30 N TCR	1:53.649	1:53.800	–	
10	12	(United Kingdom) Robert Huff	Sébastien Loeb Racing	Volkswagen Golf GTI TCR	1:53.786	1:53.801	–	
11	8	(Hungary) Norbert Nagy	Zengő Motorsport	CUPRA León TCR	1:53.807	1:53.805	–	
12	66	(Hungary) Zsolt Szabó	Zengő Motorsport	CUPRA León TCR	1:53.854	–	–	
13	27	(France) John Filippi	Team Oscaro by Campos Racing	CUPRA León TCR	1:53.907	–	–	
14	69	(France) Jean-Karl Vernay	Audi Sport Leopard Lukoil Team WRT	Audi RS 3 LMS TCR	1:53.981	–	–	
15	23	(France) Nathanaël Berthon	Comtoyou Racing	Audi RS 3 LMS TCR	1:54.229	–	–	
16	7	(France) Aurélien Comte	DG Sport Compétition	Peugeot 308 GTi TCR	1:54.254	–	–	
17	74	(Spain) Pepe Oriola	Team Oscaro by Campos Racing	CUPRA León TCR	1:54.271	–	–	
18	11	(Sweden) Thed Björk	M Racing-YMR	Hyundai i30 N TCR	1:54.562	–	–	
19	52	(United Kingdom) Gordon Shedden	Audi Sport Leopard Lukoil Team WRT	Audi RS 3 LMS TCR	1:54.610	–	–	
20	9	(Netherlands) Tom Coronel	Boutsen Ginion Racing	Honda Civic Type R TCR (FK8)	1:54.661	–	–	
21	70	(Slovakia) Mat'o Homola	DG Sport Compétition	Peugeot 308 GTi TCR	1:54.795	–	–	
22	21	(France) Aurélien Panis	Comtoyou Racing	Audi RS 3 LMS TCR	1:54.802	–	–	
23	10	(Italy) Gianni Morbidelli	Team Mulsanne	Alfa Romeo Giulietta TCR	1:55.024	–	–	
24	22	(Belgium) Frédéric Vervisch	Audi Sport Team Comtoyou	Audi RS 3 LMS TCR	1:55.233	–	–	
25	20	(Belgium) Denis Dupont	Audi Sport Team Comtoyou	Audi RS 3 LMS TCR	1:55.994	–	–	
26	19	(Hungary) Attila Tassi	KCMG	Honda Civic Type R TCR (FK8)	–	–	–	
27	88	(Italy) Fabrizio Giovanardi	Team Mulsanne	Alfa Romeo Giulietta TCR	–	–	–	

=== Race 2 ===
Pos.	No.	Name	Team	Car	Laps	Time/Retired	Grid	Points
1	12	(United Kingdom) Robert Huff	Sébastien Loeb Racing	Volkswagen Golf GTI TCR	12	23:11.390	1	25
2	99	(Hungary) Dániel Nagy	M1RA	Hyundai i30 N TCR	12	+0.562	2	18
3	48	(France) Yvan Muller	M Racing-YMR	Hyundai i30 N TCR	12	+2.200	5	15
4	30	(Italy) Gabriele Tarquini	BRC Racing Team	Hyundai i30 N TCR	12	+2.659	9	12
5	86	(Argentina) Esteban Guerrieri	ALL-INKL.COM Münnich Motorsport	Honda Civic Type R TCR (FK8)	12	+13.050	8	10
6	5	(Hungary) Norbert Michelisz	BRC Racing Team	Hyundai i30 N TCR	12	+4.252	10	8
7	25	(Morocco) Mehdi Bennani	Sébastien Loeb Racing	Volkswagen Golf GTI TCR	12	+8.529	3	6
8	63	(Belgium) Benjamin Lessennes	Boutsen Ginion Racing	Honda Civic Type R TCR (FK8)	12	+13.453	6	4
9	66	(Hungary) Zsolt Szabó	Zengő Motorsport	CUPRA León TCR	12	+19.460	12	2
10	69	(France) Jean-Karl Vernay	Audi Sport Leopard Lukoil Team WRT	Audi RS 3 LMS TCR	12	+19.896	14	1
11	8	(Hungary) Norbert Nagy	Zengő Motorsport	CUPRA León TCR	12	+22.475	11	
12	11	(Sweden) Thed Björk	M Racing-YMR	Hyundai i30 N TCR	12	+22.855	18	
13	27	(France) John Filippi	Team Oscaro by Campos Racing	CUPRA León TCR	12	+24.007	13	
14	23	(France) Nathanaël Berthon	Comtoyou Racing	Audi RS 3 LMS TCR	12	+24.480	15	
15	52	(United Kingdom) Gordon Shedden	Audi Sport Leopard Lukoil Team WRT	Audi RS 3 LMS TCR	12	+25.916	19	
16	7	(France) Aurélien Comte	DG Sport Compétition	Peugeot 308 GTi TCR	12	+26.732	16	
17	22	(Belgium) Frédéric Vervisch	Audi Sport Team Comtoyou	Audi RS 3 LMS TCR	12	+27.115	24	
18	19	(Hungary) Attila Tassi	KCMG	Honda Civic Type R TCR (FK8)	12	+27.832	26	
19	9	(Netherlands) Tom Coronel	Boutsen Ginion Racing	Honda Civic Type R TCR (FK8)	12	+31.597	20	
20	21	(France) Aurélien Panis	Comtoyou Racing	Audi RS 3 LMS TCR	12	+33.739	22	
21	20	(Belgium) Denis Dupont	Audi Sport Team Comtoyou	Audi RS 3 LMS TCR	12	+39.207	25	
22	10	(Italy) Gianni Morbidelli	Team Mulsanne	Alfa Romeo Giulietta TCR	12	+44.396	23	
23	88	(Italy) Fabrizio Giovanardi	Team Mulsanne	Alfa Romeo Giulietta TCR	12	+1:00.037	27	
Ret	68	(France) Yann Ehrlacher	ALL-INKL.COM Münnich Motorsport	Honda Civic Type R TCR (FK8)	8	Mechanical	7	
Ret	15	(United Kingdom) James Thompson	ALL-INKL.COM Münnich Motorsport	Honda Civic Type R TCR (FK8)	8	Mechanical	4	
Ret	70	(Slovakia) Mat'o Homola	DG Sport Compétition	Peugeot 308 GTi TCR	7	Retired	18	
Ret	74	(Spain) Pepe Oriola	Team Oscaro by Campos Racing	CUPRA León TCR	5	Retired	17	

- Fabrizio Giovanardi originally finished nineteenth was given a 30-second time penalty.

=== Race 3 ===
Pos.	No.	Name	Team	Car	Laps	Time/Retired	Grid	Points
1	30	(Italy) Gabriele Tarquini	BRC Racing Team	Hyundai i30 N TCR	17	46:49:549	2	30
2	5	(Hungary) Norbert Michelisz	BRC Racing Team	Hyundai i30 N TCR	17	+0.354	1	23
3	48	(France) Yvan Muller	M Racing-YMR	Hyundai i30 N TCR	17	+3.691	6	19
4	68	(France) Yann Ehrlacher	ALL-INKL.COM Münnich Motorsport	Honda Civic Type R TCR (FK8)	17	+4.092	4	16
5	63	(Belgium) Benjamin Lessennes	Boutsen Ginion Racing	Honda Civic Type R TCR (FK8)	17	+7.675	5	13
6	99	(Hungary) Dániel Nagy	M1RA	Hyundai i30 N TCR	17	+8.198	9	10
7	15	(United Kingdom) James Thompson	ALL-INKL.COM Münnich Motorsport	Honda Civic Type R TCR (FK8)	17	+9.631	7	7
8	12	(United Kingdom) Robert Huff	Sébastien Loeb Racing	Volkswagen Golf GTI TCR	17	+12.386	10	4
9	11	(Sweden) Thed Björk	M Racing-YMR	Hyundai i30 N TCR	17	+12.999	18	2
10	69	(France) Jean-Karl Vernay	Audi Sport Leopard Lukoil Team WRT	Audi RS 3 LMS TCR	17	+17.645	14	1
11	8	(Hungary) Norbert Nagy	Zengő Motorsport	CUPRA León TCR	17	+21.297	11	
12	52	(United Kingdom) Gordon Shedden	Audi Sport Leopard Lukoil Team WRT	Audi RS 3 LMS TCR	17	+22.769	19	
13	7	(France) Aurélien Comte	DG Sport Compétition	Peugeot 308 GTi TCR	17	+23.439	16	
14	10	(Italy) Gianni Morbidelli	Team Mulsanne	Alfa Romeo Giulietta TCR	17	+24.124	23	
15	19	(Hungary) Attila Tassi	KCMG	Honda Civic Type R TCR (FK8)	17	+25.688	26	
16	23	(France) Nathanaël Berthon	Comtoyou Racing	Audi RS 3 LMS TCR	17	+26.354	15	
17	25	(Morocco) Mehdi Bennani	Sébastien Loeb Racing	Volkswagen Golf GTI TCR	17	+27.077	8	
18	22	(Belgium) Frédéric Vervisch	Audi Sport Team Comtoyou	Audi RS 3 LMS TCR	17	+27.869	24	
19	74	(Spain) Pepe Oriola	Team Oscaro by Campos Racing	CUPRA León TCR	17	+32.260	17	
20	70	(Slovakia) Mat'o Homola	DG Sport Compétition	Peugeot 308 GTi TCR	17	+35.404	16	
21	20	(Belgium) Denis Dupont	Audi Sport Team Comtoyou	Audi RS 3 LMS TCR	17	+35.408	25	
22	86	(Argentina) Esteban Guerrieri	ALL-INKL.COM Münnich Motorsport	Honda Civic Type R TCR (FK8)	17	+1:53.270	3	
Ret	66	(Hungary) Zsolt Szabó	Zengő Motorsport	CUPRA León TCR	6	Retired	12	
Ret	9	(Netherlands) Tom Coronel	Boutsen Ginion Racing	Honda Civic Type R TCR (FK8)	5	Retired	20	
Ret	27	(France) John Filippi	Team Oscaro by Campos Racing	CUPRA León TCR	4	Retired	13	
Ret	88	(Italy) Fabrizio Giovanardi	Team Mulsanne	Alfa Romeo Giulietta TCR	3	Retired	27	
Ret	21	(France) Aurélien Panis	Comtoyou Racing	Audi RS 3 LMS TCR	1	Retired	22	

- Pepe Oriola originally finished twelfth but was given a 10-second time penalty.
- Mat'o Homola originally finished fifteenth but was given a 10-second time penalty.

== Standings after the round ==
Drivers' Championship standings

	Pos	Driver	Points
	1	(Italy) Gabriele Tarquini	118
2	2	(France) Yann Ehrlacher	82
3	3	(France) Yvan Muller	77
4	4	(Hungary) Norbert Michelisz	75
2	5	(United Kingdom) Robert Huff	65

Teams' Championship standings

	Pos	Driver	Points
	1	(Italy) BRC Racing Team	200
	2	(France) M Racing-YMR	146
2	3	(Germany) ALL-INKL.COM Münnich Motorsport	133
	4	(France) Sébastien Loeb Racing	115
2	5	(Luxembourg) Audi Sport Leopard Lukoil Team WRT	71
