= FIA WTCR Race of Spain =

- MotorLand Aragón (2020–2022)

Race information
- Number of times held: 11
- First held: 2005
- Last held: 2022
- Most wins (drivers): (France) Yvan Muller (4)
- Most wins (constructors): (United States) Chevrolet (6)

Last race (2022)
- Race 1 Winner: (Belgium) Gilles Magnus; (Audi Sport Team Comtoyou)
- Race 2 Winner: (Spain) Mikel Azcona; (BRC Hyundai N Squadra Corse)

The FIA WTCR Race of Spain is a round of the World Touring Car Championship, which was held at the Circuit Ricardo Tormo near the city of Valencia in Spain. The race ran at Valencia every year from the return of the series in 2005 season through to 2012. The event was initially kept on the 2013 calendar without a venue being confirmed, it was later dropped entirely from the schedule.

Jordi Gené is the only Spanish driver to win their home race. He won the first race in 2005 from pole position driving for native manufacturer SEAT.

This round has returned to WTCR from 2020, but the venue is MotorLand Aragón now.

== Winners ==
Circuit Ricardo Tormo, which held races in 2005–2012

Year	Race	Driver	Manufacturer	Location	Report
2022	Race 1	(Belgium) Gilles Magnus	(Germany) Audi	Aragón	Report
2022	Race 2	(Spain) Mikel Azcona	(South Korea) Hyundai	Aragón	Report
2021	Race 1	(Italy) Gabriele Tarquini	(South Korea) Hyundai	Aragón	Report
2021	Race 2	(Belgium) Frédéric Vervisch	(Germany) Audi	Aragón	Report
2020	Race 1	(France) Jean-Karl Vernay	(Italy) Alfa Romeo	Aragón	Report
2020	Race 2	(Spain) Mikel Azcona	(Spain) Cupra	Aragón	Report
2020	Race 3	(Sweden) Thed Björk	(Sweden) Lynk & Co	Aragón	Report
2012	Race 1	(France) Yvan Muller	(United States) Chevrolet	Valencia	Report
2012	Race 2	(Switzerland) Alain Menu	(United States) Chevrolet	Valencia	Report
2011	Race 1	(France) Yvan Muller	(United States) Chevrolet	Valencia	Report
2011	Race 2	(France) Yvan Muller	(United States) Chevrolet	Valencia	Report
2010	Race 1	(Italy) Gabriele Tarquini	(Spain) SEAT	Valencia	Report
2010	Race 2	(Portugal) Tiago Monteiro	(Spain) SEAT	Valencia	Report
2009	Race 1	(France) Yvan Muller	(Spain) SEAT	Valencia	Report
2009	Race 2	(Brazil) Augusto Farfus	(Germany) BMW	Valencia	Report
2008	Race 1	(United Kingdom) Rob Huff	(United States) Chevrolet	Valencia	Report
2008	Race 2	(Switzerland) Alain Menu	(United States) Chevrolet	Valencia	Report
2007	Race 1	(United Kingdom) James Thompson	(Italy) Alfa Romeo	Valencia	Report
2007	Race 2	(United Kingdom) James Thompson	(Italy) Alfa Romeo	Valencia	Report
2006	Race 1	(Brazil) Augusto Farfus	(Italy) Alfa Romeo	Valencia	Report
2006	Race 2	(Germany) Jörg Müller	(Germany) BMW	Valencia	Report
2005	Race 1	(Spain) Jordi Gené	(Spain) SEAT	Valencia	Report
2005	Race 2	(Germany) Jörg Müller	(Germany) BMW	Valencia	Report

== FIA WTCR Race of Aragón ==
FIA WTCR Race of Aragón
- MotorLand Aragón (with chicanes on backstraight) (2020)

Race information
- Number of times held: 1
- First held: 2020
- Last held: 2020
- Most wins (drivers): (France) Nathanaël Berthon (1) (France) Yvan Muller (1) (Uruguay) Santiago Urrutia (1)
- Most wins (constructors): (Sweden) Lynk & Co (2)

Last race (2020)
- Race 1 Winner: (Argentina) Esteban Guerrieri; (ALL-INKL.COM Münnich Motorsport)
- Race 2 Winner: (France) Yvan Muller; (Cyan Racing Lynk & Co)
- Race 3 Winner: (Uruguay) Santiago Urrutia; (Cyan Performance Lynk & Co)

Due to the cancellation of WTCR Race of Italy in 2020 World Touring Car Cup, another race was added after WTCR Race of Spain as season-finale of the 2020 WTCR season, which was called as WTCR Race of Aragón. In rder to make difference from the previous race, chicanes were used on the backstraight of circuit. The race was held on 14–15 November 2020.

=== Winners ===
Year	Race	Driver	Manufacturer	Location	Report
2020	Race 1	(Argentina) Esteban Guerrieri	(Japan) Honda	MotorLand Aragón	Report
2020	Race 2	(France) Yvan Muller	(Sweden) Lynk & Co	MotorLand Aragón	Report
2020	Race 3	(Uruguay) Santiago Urrutia	(Sweden) Lynk & Co	MotorLand Aragón	Report
