= FIA WTCR Race of Hungary =

- Hungaroring (2011–2022)

Race information
- Number of times held: 12
- First held: 2011
- Last held: 2022
- Most wins (drivers): (France) Yvan Muller (4)
- Most wins (constructors): (Japan) Honda (7)

Last race (2022)
- Race 1 Winner: (Spain) Mikel Azcona; (BRC Hyundai N Squadra Corse)
- Race 2 Winner: (Uruguay) Santiago Urrutia; (Cyan Performance Lynk & Co)

The FIA WTCR Race of Hungary, previously FIA WTCC Race of Hungary, is a round of the World Touring Car Cup, currently held at the Hungaroring near the city of Budapest.

The race makes it debut in the World Touring Car Championship as the 4th round, and as a replacement for the Moroccan round after it was dropped as "the local promoter was unable to commit to an agreement for the organisation of the event."

The Race debut in 2011 saw the dominating Chevrolet drivers of Alain Menu and Yvan Muller take victories and make full advantage of championship leader Rob Huff's poor qualifying and race results. The first race saw a first podium for Javier Villa, a Spanish driver debuting in the WTCC who shared the podium with local driver Norbert Michelisz in the BMW.

Race 2 was affected by rain in the middle bulk of the race, Robert Huff failed to score whilst after a double win in the previous round at Monza, whilst Yvan Muller and Alain Menu had a Chevrolet one-two ahead of Gabriele Tarquini.

The debut Hungarian round was the fourth round of the championship.

The circuit continued to host the round when the WTCC was renamed the FIA World Touring Car Cup in 2018.

== Winners ==
Year	Race	Driver	Manufacturer	Location	Report
2022	Race 1	(Spain) Mikel Azcona	(South Korea) Hyundai	Hungaroring	Report
2022	Race 2	(Uruguay) Santiago Urrutia	(Sweden) Lynk & Co	Hungaroring	Report
2021	Race 1	(Belgium) Gilles Magnus	(Germany) Audi	Hungaroring	Report
2021	Race 2	(Uruguay) Santiago Urrutia	(Sweden) Lynk & Co	Hungaroring	Report
2020	Race 1	(Argentina) Esteban Guerrieri	(Japan) Honda	Hungaroring	Report
2020	Race 2	(France) Yann Ehrlacher	(Sweden) Lynk & Co	Hungaroring	Report
2020	Race 3	(Argentina) Esteban Guerrieri	(Japan) Honda	Hungaroring	Report
2019	Race 1	(Argentina) Néstor Girolami	(Japan) Honda	Hungaroring	Report
2019	Race 2	(Argentina) Néstor Girolami	(Japan) Honda	Hungaroring	Report
2019	Race 3	(Italy) Gabriele Tarquini	(South Korea) Hyundai	Hungaroring	Report
2018	Race 1	(France) Yann Ehrlacher	(Japan) Honda	Hungaroring	Report
2018	Race 2	(United Kingdom) Robert Huff	(Germany) Volkswagen	Hungaroring	Report
2018	Race 3	(Italy) Gabriele Tarquini	(South Korea) Hyundai	Hungaroring	Report
2017	Opening Race	(Portugal) Tiago Monteiro	(Japan) Honda	Hungaroring	Report
2017	Main Race	(Morocco) Mehdi Bennani	(France) Citroën	Hungaroring	Report
2016	Opening Race	(Morocco) Mehdi Bennani	(France) Citroën	Hungaroring	Report
2016	Main Race	(Argentina) José María López	(France) Citroën	Hungaroring	Report
2015	Race 1	(Argentina) José María López	(France) Citroën	Hungaroring	Report
2015	Race 2	(Hungary) Norbert Michelisz	(Japan) Honda	Hungaroring	Report
2014	Race 1	(France) Yvan Muller	(France) Citroën	Hungaroring	Report
2014	Race 2	(Italy) Gianni Morbidelli	(United States) Chevrolet	Hungaroring	Report
2013	Race 1	(France) Yvan Muller	(United States) Chevrolet	Hungaroring	Report
2013	Race 2	(United Kingdom) Robert Huff	(Spain) SEAT	Hungaroring	Report
2012	Race 1	(France) Yvan Muller	(United States) Chevrolet	Hungaroring	Report
2012	Race 2	(Hungary) Norbert Michelisz	(Germany) BMW	Hungaroring	Report
2011	Race 1	(Switzerland) Alain Menu	(United States) Chevrolet	Hungaroring	Report
2011	Race 2	(France) Yvan Muller	(United States) Chevrolet	Hungaroring	Report

FIA European STC years: Hungaroring also hosted rounds in the predecessor of the WTCC in 2000 and 2001 during its initial Super Touring era.

Year	Race	Driver	Manufacturer	Location	Report
2001	Race 1	(Italy) Fabrizio Giovanardi	(Italy) Alfa Romeo	Hungaroring	Report
2001	Race 2	(Italy) Roberto Colciago	(Germany) Audi	Hungaroring	Report
2001	Super Production Race	(Netherlands) Duncan Huisman	(Germany) BMW	Hungaroring	Report
2000	Race 1	(Italy) Gianni Morbidelli	(Germany) BMW	Hungaroring	Report
2000	Race 2	(Italy) Gianni Morbidelli	(Germany) BMW	Hungaroring	Report
