= FIA WTCR Race of China =

- Ningbo International Circuit (2017–2019)
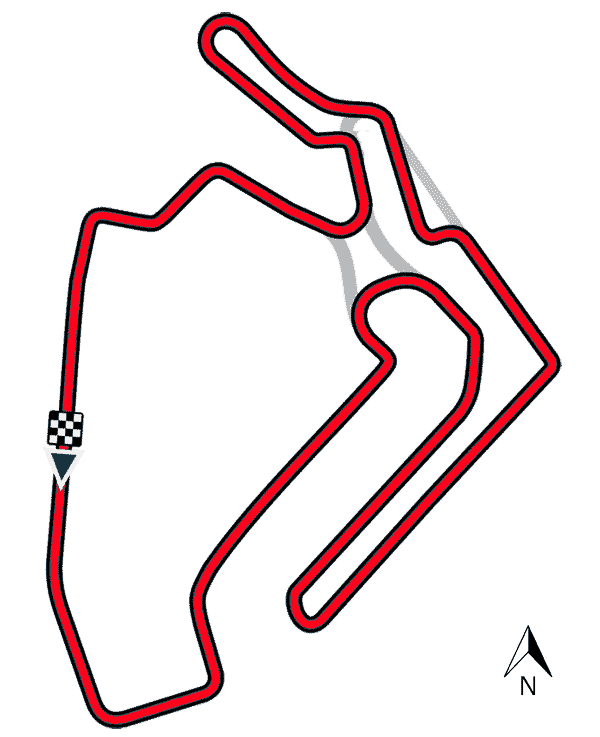

Race information
- Number of times held: 8
- First held: 2011
- Last held: 2019
- Most wins (drivers): (Argentina) José María López (3)
- Most wins (constructors): (United States) Chevrolet (7)

Last race (2019)
- Race 1 Winner: (France) Yvan Muller; (Cyan Racing Lynk & Co)
- Race 2 Winner: (Hungary) Norbert Michelisz; (BRC Hyundai N Squadra Corse)
- Race 3 Winner: (France) Yvan Muller; (Cyan Racing Lynk & Co)

The FIA WTCC Race of China is a round of the World Touring Car Championship currently held at the Shanghai International Circuit located in Shanghai, China. The 2011 round was first announced to be held at the Guangdong International Circuit, but was later moved to Tianma Circuit for an unspecified reason. For 2012 the race moved to the nearby Shanghai International Circuit.

The race made its debut in the World Touring Car Championship as the 11th round of the 2011 World Touring Car Championship season.

== Winners ==
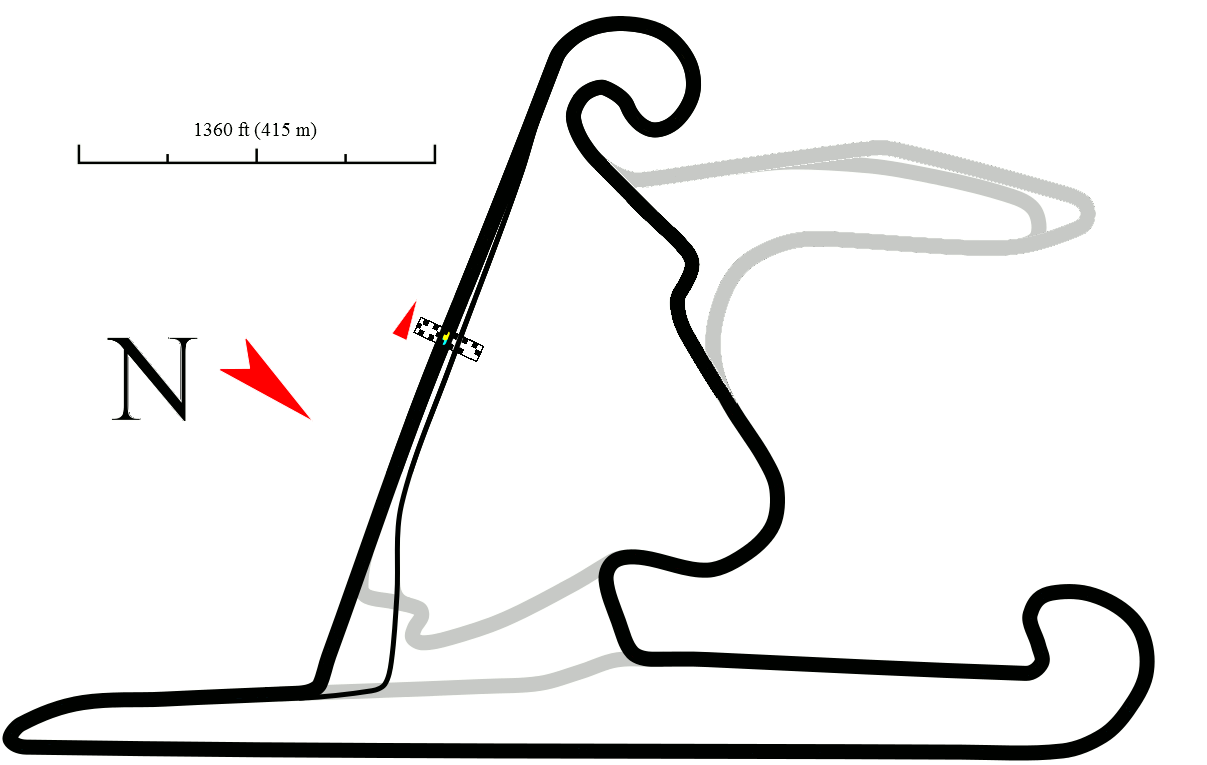
Shanghai International Circuit, which held races in 2012–2016

Goldenport Park Circuit, which held race in 2014

Shanghai Tianma Circuit, which held race in 2011

Year	Race	Driver	Manufacturer	Location	Report
2019	Race 1	(France) Yvan Muller	(Sweden) Lynk & Co	Ningbo International Circuit	Report
2019	Race 2	(Hungary) Norbert Michelisz	(South Korea) Hyundai	Ningbo International Circuit	Report
2019	Race 3	(France) Yvan Muller	(Sweden) Lynk & Co	Ningbo International Circuit	Report
2018	Race 1	(France) Jean-Karl Vernay	(Germany) Audi	Wuhan Street Circuit	Report
2018	Race 2	(Morocco) Mehdi Bennani	(Germany) Volkswagen	Wuhan Street Circuit	Report
2018	Race 3	(United Kingdom) Gordon Shedden	(Germany) Audi	Wuhan Street Circuit	Report
2018	Race 1	(Sweden) Thed Björk	(South Korea) Hyundai	Ningbo International Circuit	Report
2018	Race 2	(France) Yvan Muller	(South Korea) Hyundai	Ningbo International Circuit	Report
2018	Race 3	(Sweden) Thed Björk	(South Korea) Hyundai	Ningbo International Circuit	Report
2017	Opening Race	(Argentina) Esteban Guerrieri	(United States) Chevrolet	Ningbo International Circuit	Report
2017	Main Race	(Argentina) Néstor Girolami	(Sweden) Volvo	Ningbo International Circuit	Report
2016	Opening Race	(Sweden) Thed Björk	(Sweden) Volvo	Shanghai International Circuit	Report
2016	Main Race	(Argentina) José María López	(France) Citroën	Shanghai International Circuit	Report
2015	Race 1	(Argentina) José María López	(France) Citroën	Shanghai International Circuit	Report
2015	Race 2	(France) Yvan Muller	(France) Citroën	Shanghai International Circuit	Report
2014	Race 1	(Argentina) José María López	(France) Citroën	Shanghai International Circuit	Report
2014	Race 2	(Morocco) Mehdi Bennani	(Japan) Honda	Shanghai International Circuit	Report
2014	Race 1	(United Kingdom) Tom Chilton	(United States) Chevrolet	Goldenport Park Circuit	Report
2014	Race 2	(United Kingdom) Robert Huff	(Russia) Lada	Goldenport Park Circuit	Report
2013	Race 1	(United Kingdom) Tom Chilton	(United States) Chevrolet	Shanghai International Circuit	Report
2013	Race 2	(Portugal) Tiago Monteiro	(Japan) Honda	Shanghai International Circuit	Report
2012	Race 1	(Switzerland) Alain Menu	(United States) Chevrolet	Shanghai International Circuit	Report
2012	Race 2	(United Kingdom) Robert Huff	(United States) Chevrolet	Shanghai International Circuit	Report
2011	Race 1	(Switzerland) Alain Menu	(United States) Chevrolet	Tianma Circuit	Report
2011	Race 2	(France) Yvan Muller	(United States) Chevrolet	Tianma Circuit	Report
