= FIA WTCR Race of France =

- Circuit de Pau-Ville (2007–2009, 2022)

Race information
- Number of times held: 10
- First held: 2005
- Last held: 2022
- Most wins (drivers): (Argentina) José María López (3)
- Most wins (constructors): (Germany) BMW (7)

Last race (2022)
- Race 1 Winner: (Argentina) Néstor Girolami; (ALL-INKL.COM Münnich Motorsport)
- Race 2 Winner: (Spain) Mikel Azcona; (BRC Hyundai N Squadra Corse)

The FIA WTCR Race of France is a round of the World Touring Car Cup which was held at the Circuit Pau-Arnos in 2021 and at the Circuit de Pau-Ville in 2022. It was previously held at the Circuit Paul Ricard and the Circuit de Nevers Magny-Cours.

In 2005 and 2006 it was run at Magny-Cours, before moving to Pau in 2007, when it became the main event in the Pau Grand Prix weekend. However, there was no French round in the 2010 season. After Citroën confirmed their entry into the 2014 season, Citroën Racing team principal Yves Matton suggested a French round would be a good idea. A French round returned to the calendar for 2014, this time held at the Circuit Paul Ricard.

Yvan Muller and Sébastien Loeb are the only French drivers to have won their home race having won in 2014 and 2015 at the Circuit Paul Ricard.

== Winners ==
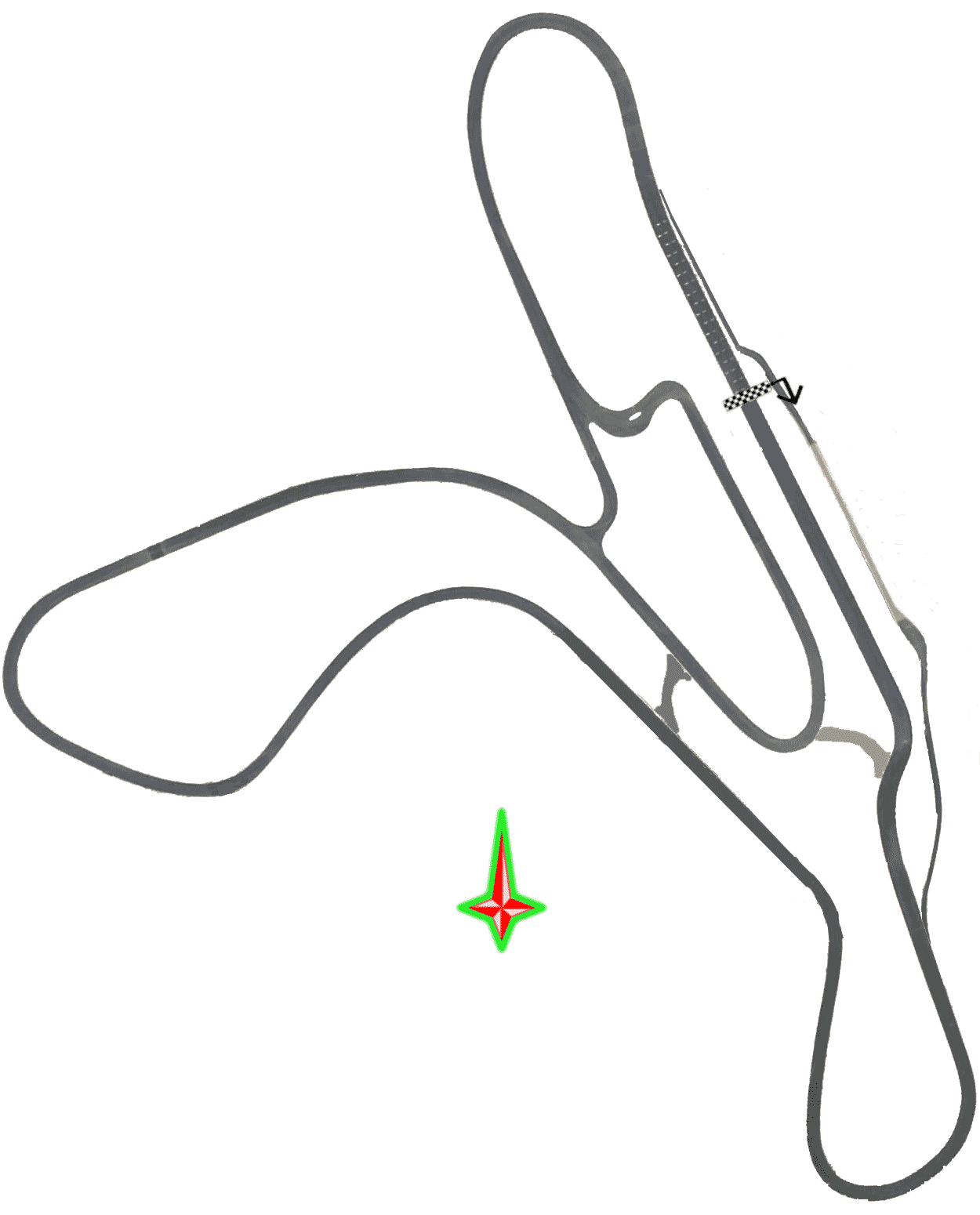
Pau-Arnos circuit, which held race in 2021

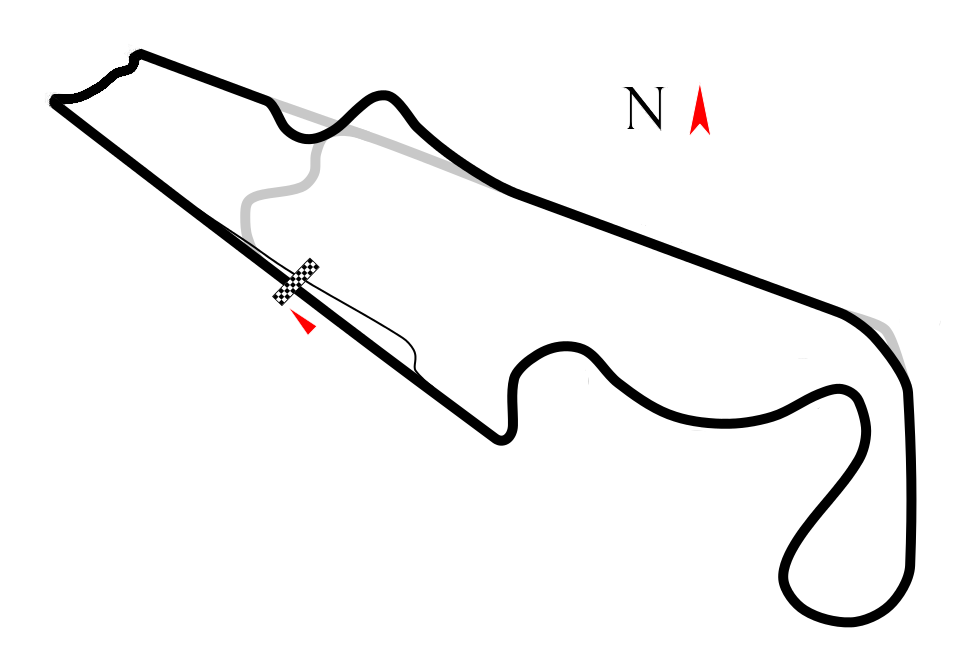
Paul Ricard circuit, which held races in 2014–2016

Magny-Cours circuit, which held races in 2005–2006

Year	Race	Driver	Manufacturer	Location	Report
2022	Race 1	(Argentina) Néstor Girolami	(Japan) Honda	Pau-Ville	Report
2022	Race 2	(Spain) Mikel Azcona	(South Korea) Hyundai	Pau-Ville	Report
2021	Race 1	(Belgium) Frédéric Vervisch	(Germany) Audi	Pau-Arnos	Report
2021	Race 2	(France) Jean-Karl Vernay	(South Korea) Hyundai	Pau-Arnos	Report
2016	Opening Race	(United Kingdom) Robert Huff	(Japan) Honda	Paul Ricard	Report
2016	Main Race	(Argentina) José María López	(France) Citroën	Paul Ricard	Report
2015	Race 1	(France) Sébastien Loeb	(France) Citroën	Paul Ricard	Report
2015	Race 2	(Argentina) José María López	(France) Citroën	Paul Ricard	Report
2014	Race 1	(France) Yvan Muller	(France) Citroën	Paul Ricard	Report
2014	Race 2	(Argentina) José María López	(France) Citroën	Paul Ricard	Report
2009	Race 1	(United Kingdom) Robert Huff	(United States) Chevrolet	Pau-Ville	Report
2009	Race 2	(Switzerland) Alain Menu	(United States) Chevrolet	Pau-Ville	Report
2008	Race 1	(Brazil) Augusto Farfus	(Germany) BMW	Pau-Ville	Report
2008	Race 2	(United Kingdom) Andy Priaulx	(Germany) BMW	Pau-Ville	Report
2007	Race 1	(Switzerland) Alain Menu	(United States) Chevrolet	Pau-Ville	Report
2007	Race 2	(Brazil) Augusto Farfus	(Germany) BMW	Pau-Ville	Report
2006	Race 1	(Germany) Dirk Müller	(Germany) BMW	Magny-Cours	Report
2006	Race 2	(United Kingdom) Andy Priaulx	(Germany) BMW	Magny-Cours	Report
2005	Race 1	(Germany) Jörg Müller	(Germany) BMW	Magny-Cours	Report
2005	Race 2	(Germany) Jörg Müller	(Germany) BMW	Magny-Cours	Report

== FIA WTCR Race of Alsace Grand Est ==
FIA WTCR Race of Alsace Grand Est
- Anneau du Rhin (2022)
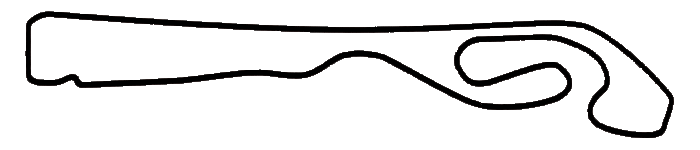

Race information
- Number of times held: 1
- First held: 2022
- Last held: 2022
- Most wins (drivers): (France) Nathanaël Berthon (1) (United Kingdom) Robert Huff (1)
- Most wins (constructors): (Germany) Audi (1) (Spain) CUPRA (1)

Last race (2022)
- Race 1 Winner: (France) Nathanaël Berthon; (Audi Sport Team Comtoyou DHL)
- Race 2 Winner: (United Kingdom) Robert Huff; (Zengő Motorsport)

On 14 April 2022, WTCR Race of Alsace Grand Est was added to the calendar instead of the FIA WTCR Race of Russia, which was cancelled due to the ongoing Russian invasion of Ukraine. The race was held on 7 August 2022.

=== Winners ===
Year	Race	Driver	Manufacturer	Location	Report
2022	Race 1	(France) Nathanaël Berthon	(Germany) Audi	Anneau du Rhin	Report
2022	Race 2	(United Kingdom) Robert Huff	(Spain) CUPRA	Anneau du Rhin	Report
