= FIA WTCR Race of Saudi Arabia =

2022 round of the World Touring Car Cup

- Jeddah Corniche Circuit (2022)

Race information
- Number of times held: 1
- First held: 2022
- Last held: 2022
- Most wins (drivers): (France) Nathanaël Berthon (Belgium) Gilles Magnus (1)
- Most wins (constructors): (Germany) Audi (1)

Last race (2022)
- Race 1 Winner: (France) Nathanaël Berthon; (Comtoyou DHL Team Audi Sport)
- Race 2 Winner: (Belgium) Gilles Magnus; (Comtoyou Team Audi Sport)

The FIA WTCR Race of Saudi Arabia was a round of the World Touring Car Cup, which was held at the Jeddah Corniche Circuit in Jeddah, Saudi Arabia. The race was the season finale of the 2022 season. Instead of the 6.174 km (3.836 mi) grand prix layout, shorter 3.450 km (2.144 mi) layout was configured for this touring car race.

== Winners ==
Year	Race	Driver	Team	Manufacturer	Location	Report
2022	Race 1	(France) Nathanaël Berthon	(Belgium) Comtoyou DHL Team Audi Sport	(Germany) Audi	Jeddah	Report
2022	Race 2	(Belgium) Gilles Magnus	(Belgium) Comtoyou Team Audi Sport	(Germany) Audi	Jeddah	Report
