= FIA WTCR Race of Bahrain =

- Bahrain International Circuit (2022)

Race information
- Number of times held: 1
- First held: 2022
- Last held: 2022
- Most wins (drivers): (Spain) Mikel Azcona (Hungary) Norbert Michelisz (1)
- Most wins (constructors): (South Korea) Hyundai (2)

Last race (2022)
- Race 1 Winner: (Spain) Mikel Azcona; (BRC Hyundai N Squadra Corse)
- Race 2 Winner: (Hungary) Norbert Michelisz; (BRC Hyundai N Squadra Corse)

The FIA WTCR Race of Bahrain was a round of the World Touring Car Cup, which was held at the Bahrain International Circuit in Sakhir, Bahrain. The race ran as the penultimate race of the 2022 season.

== Winners ==
Year	Race	Driver	Team	Manufacturer	Location	Report
2022	Race 1	(Spain) Mikel Azcona	(Italy) BRC Hyundai N Squadra Corse	(South Korea) Hyundai	Sakhir	Report
2022	Race 2	(Hungary) Norbert Michelisz	(Italy) BRC Hyundai N Squadra Corse	(South Korea) Hyundai	Sakhir	Report
