= FIA WTCR Race of Italy =

- Vallelunga Circuit (2022)

Race information
- Number of times held: 12
- First held: 2005
- Last held: 2022
- Most wins (drivers): (France) Yvan Muller (8)
- Most wins (constructors): (United States) Chevrolet (7)

Last race (2022)
- Race 1 Winner: (Argentina) Néstor Girolami; (ALL-INKL.COM Münnich Motorsport)
- Race 2 Winner: (Belgium) Gilles Magnus; (Audi Sport Team Comtoyou)

The FIA WTCR Race of Italy is a round of the World Touring Car Championship that has taken place in Italy. It will be held at Vallelunga Circuit in 2022 season. In 2021, it was held at the extended version of Adria International Raceway. Before that, it was mostly held at the Autodromo Nazionale di Monza in Monza near Milan, Lombardy.

The Race of Italy was the first round of the WTCC after its return in 2005. It was held at Autodromo Nazionale di Monza between 2005 and 2008 before switching to the Autodromo Enzo e Dino Ferrari in Imola for 2009 in order to avoid clashing with the Formula One calendar. A round of the WTCC had already been held at Imola twice, firstly in 2005 when it was known as the 2005 FIA WTCC Race of San Marino and then in 2008 as the 2008 FIA WTCC Race of Europe. In December 2009 it was confirmed Monza would return to host the Italian round of the WTCC, where it has continued to be run since. When the provisional 2014 calendar was released in November 2013, Italy had been dropped from the schedule having hosted a race in every season of the championship since it began in 2005.

Gabriele Tarquini is the only driver to have won his home race, having won race two of the 2008 Race of Italy and race one of the 2009 Race of Italy.

== Winners ==
Monza Circuit, which held races in 2005–2008, 2010–2013, and 2017

Imola Circuit, which held race in 2009

Year	Race	Driver	Manufacturer	Location	Report
2022	Race 1	(Argentina) Néstor Girolami	(Japan) Honda	Vallelunga	Report
2022	Race 2	(Belgium) Gilles Magnus	(Germany) Audi	Vallelunga	Report
2021	Race 1	(Uruguay) Santiago Urrutia	(Sweden) Lynk & Co	Adria	Report
2021	Race 2	(France) Yann Ehrlacher	(Sweden) Lynk & Co	Adria	Report
2017	Opening Race	(United Kingdom) Tom Chilton	(France) Citroën	Monza	Report
2017	Main Race	(Sweden) Thed Björk	(Sweden) Volvo	Monza	Report
2013	Race 1	(France) Yvan Muller	(United States) Chevrolet	Monza	Report
2013	Race 2	(France) Yvan Muller	(United States) Chevrolet	Monza	Report
2012	Race 1	(France) Yvan Muller	(United States) Chevrolet	Monza	Report
2012	Race 2	(France) Yvan Muller	(United States) Chevrolet	Monza	Report
2011	Race 1	(United Kingdom) Robert Huff	(United States) Chevrolet	Monza	Report
2011	Race 2	(United Kingdom) Robert Huff	(United States) Chevrolet	Monza	Report
2010	Race 1	(United Kingdom) Andy Priaulx	(Germany) BMW	Monza	Report
2010	Race 2	(France) Yvan Muller	(United States) Chevrolet	Monza	Report
2009	Race 1	(Italy) Gabriele Tarquini	(Spain) SEAT	Imola	Report
2009	Race 2	(France) Yvan Muller	(Spain) SEAT	Imola	Report
2008	Race 1	(France) Yvan Muller	(Spain) SEAT	Monza	Report
2008	Race 2	(Italy) Gabriele Tarquini	(Spain) SEAT	Monza	Report
2007	Race 1	(France) Yvan Muller	(Spain) SEAT	Monza	Report
2007	Race 2	(Spain) Jordi Gené	(Spain) SEAT	Monza	Report
2006	Race 1	(United Kingdom) Andy Priaulx	(Germany) BMW	Monza	Report
2006	Race 2	(Brazil) Augusto Farfus	(Italy) Alfa Romeo	Monza	Report
2005	Race 1	(Germany) Dirk Müller	(Germany) BMW	Monza	Report
2005	Race 2	(United Kingdom) James Thompson	(Italy) Alfa Romeo	Monza	Report
