= BRC Racing Team =

(Italy) BRC Racing Team
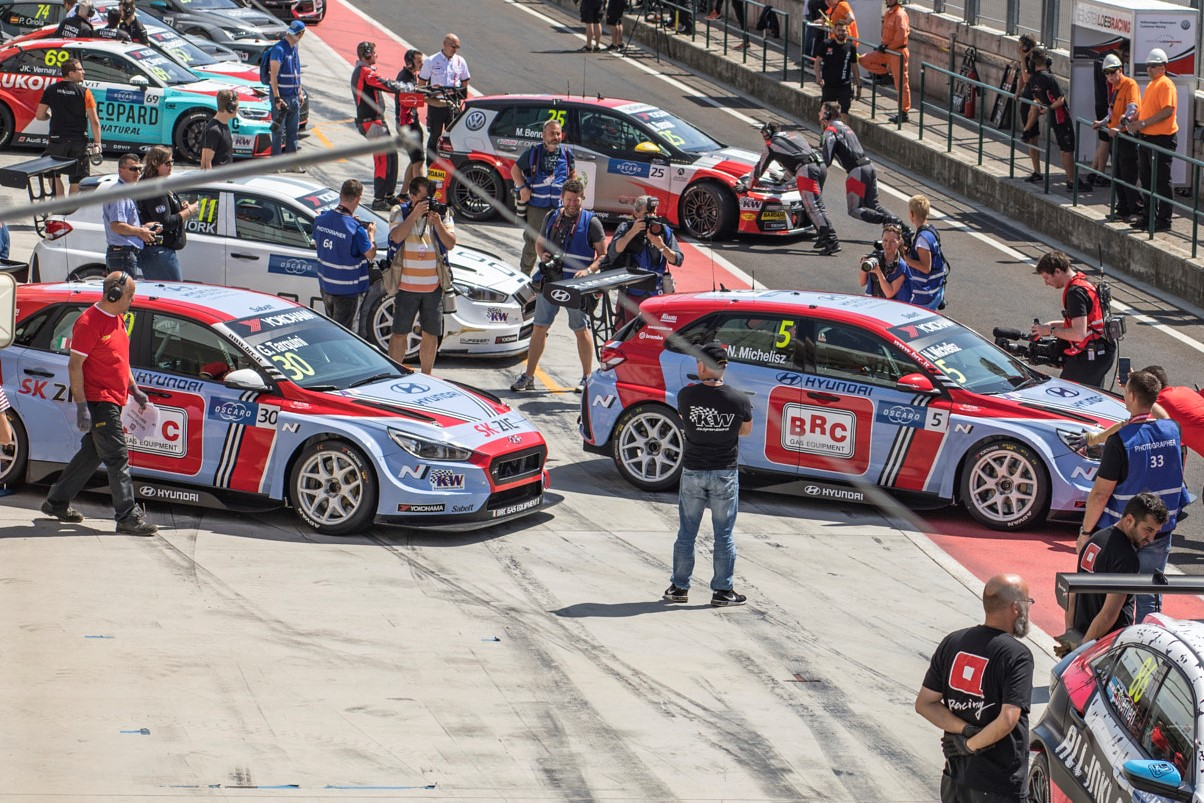
- Founded: 2009
- Team principal(s): Massimiliano Fissore
- Current series: TCR International Series; Tour European Rally; Italian Rally Championship
- Former series: Italian Touring Car Championship
- Noted drivers: WTCR; 1. (Hungary) Norbert Michelisz; 30. (Italy) Gabriele Tarquini; TCR Europe; 70. (Slovakia) Mat'o Homola; 99. (Hungary) Dániel Nagy
- Website: http://www.brcracingteam.com

BRC Racing Team is an Italian auto racing team based in Cherasco, Italy. The team is currently competing in various racing series such as TCR International Series and Tour European Rally. The team is sponsored by BRC Gas Equipment and the team is notorious for felding rally cars converted to Liquefied petroleum gas.

== History ==
The team was founded in 2009 and began participating in the Spanish Endurance Championship with Nissan 350Z. The team would later participate in various road and rally competitions in Spain and Italy like Suzuki Rally Trophy and Seat Léon Supercopa. BRC Racing Team has also organized the Green Scout/Hybrid Cup which later become the Italian Alternative Energies Championship from 2011 to 2015.

== LPG Rally Cars ==
BRC Racing Team entered the Italian Rally Championship in 2014 and 2015 using LPG converted Ford Fiesta R5 for Giandomenico Basso. During the course of both seasons the team registered 2 wins and 13 podiums with Basso finishing 2nd in the championship in both seasons. Basso continued with the team in 2016 in which he won 2 rallies and 4 more podiums winning the championship using conventional Fiesta R5. The other driver - Simone Campedelli - finished 4th in the standings using the LPG Fiesta R5.

For 2017 Basso and BRC Racing team entered the newly formed Tour European Rally using Hyundai i20 R5.

== TCR ==
BRC Racing Team is also a partner of Hyundai Motorsport in the TCR International Series assisting with the development and fielding Hyundai i30 N TCR. When the series became the World Touring Car Cup in 2018, they fielded 2 i30s for Norbert Michelisz and Gabriele Tarquini.

Michelisz won the drivers' title in 2019 for BRC Racing, the second time the team had won.
