= Motorsport Australia Superlicence =

Driver's qualification

The Motorsport Australia Superlicence is a racing license given by Motorsport Australia. It is required for all drivers in the Supercars Championship, the highest-profile domestic circuit racing series in Australia. It was introduced in 2017 before being amended in 2023 and returning the next year.

== History ==
Introduced in 2017, following the debut of then 18-year-old Kurt Kostecki the previous year, the Motorsport Australian Superlicence—then known as the CAMS Superlicence—was introduced in an effort to aid safety concerns regarding the experience of drivers. Modelled after the FIA Super Licence, the licence saw applicants required to meet a set of criteria to participate in the Supercars Championship, including a minimum age limit, and a set of 13 superlicence points that drivers could earn for eligibility in the series, though dispensations could be given out at the discretion of Motorsport Australia. Series that are managed by the Australian Auto Sport Alliance are not eligible for points.

The existence of the Superlicence and the eligibility rules, were heavily criticised following their announcement, namely due to the points system. The organisers of the Australian Formula Ford Championship and Australian Formula 3 criticised the initial points system in 2017. Formula Ford was ineligible for the Superlicence points, while Formula 3 received a lower points allocation than other, "lower-level" series such as Formula 4. The two series organised argued that their series were effective training grounds for professional motorsport, and that the points allocation did not reflect the training value of their categories. The CEO of the Supercars Championship also criticised the system in 2017, saying that the system was necessary but the points table was "wrong" and "way heavily skewed with self interest in regards to Formula 4".

The system also garnered scrutiny in regards to the dispensation policy. Matt Chahda was denied a dispensation to race in Supercars in 2017, a decision amplified by the announcement of then 16-year-old Alex Rullo being given permission to race just a day prior. Nathan Herne, who placed fifth in the 2019 TA2 Racing Muscle Car Series—a series sanctioned by the Australian Auto Sport Alliance and thus not eligible for superlicence points—was denied a dispensation after Garry Rogers Motorsport applied for a dispensation for Herne to drive in the 2020 Bathurst 1000.

Initially, drivers who held FIA Gold Categorisation were not required to accrue the superlicence points, but this was later retracted for 2021 onwards.

2022 saw further changes were made to the Superlicence system. Applications for Superlicences were now to be made by Supercars teams rather than by drivers, and the points table was substantially adjusted, increasing points allocations for a number of series and increasing the required points total to 15. The Supercars Championship itself later imposed a rule stating that must compete in at least six rounds of the Super2 Series before acquiring permission to race in the Supercars Championship.

In July 2023, Motorsport Australia cancelled the Superlicence system for the 2024 season, citing the stricter rules required to earn an FIA International Grade C Circuit Licence. The Supercars Championship amended its requirements for drivers, such that a driver who placed in the top three in either the Super3 Series or the Porsche Carrera Cup Australia Championship would in the previous three years would only require three rounds in the Super2 Series, rather than six. Soon after, Motorsport Australia revealed that the Superlicence would be revamped and return for 2024, emphasising the "importance of a structured pathway" to prepare drivers for the Supercars Championship.

== Requirements ==
To qualify, an applicant must meet the requirements of the Motorsport Australia Manual, General Appendix, Competition Licences, Article 17. Teams must apply on behalf of their drivers. As of January 2025, the article states:

1. Hold an FIA International Grade C Circuit Licence or higher.
2. A minimum age of 17
3. Accumulate at least 15 points over the previous 5 seasons in either Item D of the regulations or Supplement 1 of the FIA Super Licence.

Alternatively, if a driver cannot meet requirement 3, they must meet one of the following requirements instead:

- A driver who competed in 3 rounds of the Supercars Championship during the past 5 seasons.
- A driver who competed in 6 rounds of the Super2 Series and received endorsement signatures from the director of those rounds. 3 rounds will be counted if a driver finished in the top 3 of a Super3 Series or Porsche Carrera Cup Australia season.

In response to the COVID-19 pandemic, requirement 3 was amended temporarily. Motorsport Australia confirmed that drivers whose seasons were interrupted would be considered on a case-by-case basis, with full points still awarded.

Points are awarded according to the final championship classification. As of January 2025, the Item D Superlicence points are awarded as follows:

Series	Championship position									
Series	1st	2nd	3rd	4th	5th	6th	7th	8th	9th	10th
Super2 Series	15	15	15	15	15	15	10	7	5	3
Super3 Series	12	12	12	12	10	8	6	4	2	1
Porsche Carrera Cup Australia Championship	12	12	12	10	8	6	4	2	1	1
TCR Australia Series	10	8	6	4	3	2	1	0	0	0
Porsche Sprint Challenge Australia	10	8	6	4	3	2	1	0	0	0
GT World Challenge Australia	8	6	4	3	2	1	0	0	0	0
Australian National Trans-Am Series	7	5	3	1	0	0	0	0	0	0
Formula 4 Australian Championship	7	5	3	1	0	0	0	0	0	0
Formula Regional Oceania Trophy	7	5	3	1	0	0	0	0	0	0
S5000 Australian Drivers' Championship	6	4	3	2	1	0	0	0	0	0
GT4 Australia Series	6	4	3	2	1	0	0	0	0	0
GR Cup	6	4	3	2	1	0	0	0	0	0
Australian Formula Ford Championship	6	4	3	2	1	0	0	0	0	0
SuperUtes Series	6	4	3	2	1	0	0	0	0	0
Toyota Finance 86 Championship	5	3	1	0	0	0	0	0	0	0
New Zealand Formula Ford Championship	5	3	1	0	0	0	0	0	0	0
State Formula Ford Championships	5	3	1	0	0	0	0	0	0	0
Production Car Series	5	3	1	0	0	0	0	0	0	0
Touring Car Masters	5	3	1	0	0	0	0	0	0	0
Aussie Racing Cars	5	3	1	0	0	0	0	0	0	0
Radical Cup	5	3	1	0	0	0	0	0	0	0
Prototype Series	5	3	1	0	0	0	0	0	0	0
National Sports Sedan Series	5	3	1	0	0	0	0	0	0	0
Karting series (KZ2, KA2)	3	2	1	0	0	0	0	0	0	0
