= 2021 S5000 Tasman Series =

Motor racing competition

Seasons
- ← 1975 (Tasman Series) 2022 →

The 2021 S5000 Tasman Series, known by its sponsored identity the Shannons S5000 Tasman Series, was the 13th season of the revived Tasman Series that was last held in 1975, and the first Tasman Series using S5000 machinery and therefore the S5000 moniker. It was held in late November and early December 2021. Aaron Cameron, driving for Garry Rogers Motorsport, claimed the Tasman Cup, first awarded in 1964.

== Teams and drivers ==
All teams competed with identical Rogers AF01/V8 single-seater racecars, Ligier/Onroak chassis powered by Ford Coyote V8 engines.

Team	No.	Driver	Rounds	Ref
Team BRM	1	(Australia) Joey Mawson	All	
Team BRM	28	(Japan) Yoshiaki Katayama	All	
Team BRM	98	(Spain) Roberto Merhi	All	
Garry Rogers Motorsport	18	(Australia) Aaron Cameron	All	
Garry Rogers Motorsport	29	(Australia) Nathan Herne	All	
Garry Rogers Motorsport	31	(Australia) James Golding	All	
Garry Rogers Motorsport	71	(Australia) Ben Bargwanna	1	
Tim Macrow Racing	23	(Australia) Tim Macrow	All	
AGI Sport with GRM	24	(Australia) John Martin	2	
AGI Sport with GRM	101	(Australia) Luis Leeds	All	
Versa Motorsport	37	(Australia) Cooper Webster	1	
88Racing	48	(Australia) Blake Purdie	All	
88Racing	88	(Australia) Jordan Boys	All	

- Volante Rosso Racing were planning an entry, but these plans did not come to fruition.

== Calendar ==
Originally, the second S5000 season was planned to start in September 2021, running until early 2022. After the cancellation of the 2021 Australian Grand Prix, it was decided to instead revive the Tasman Series. After the cancellation of the Gold Coast 500, the calendar saw the Tasman Series held over two rounds, the first one at Sydney Motorsports Park and the second one over the Bathurst meeting, which was now a six-day expanded Bathurst 1000 event.

The second S5000 season started in January 2022.

Round	Circuit	Location	Date
1	(New South Wales) Sydney Motorsports Park	Eastern Creek, New South Wales	20–21 November
2	(New South Wales) Mount Panorama Circuit	Bathurst, New South Wales	2–5 December

== Race results ==
Round		Circuit	Date	Pole position	Fastest lap	Winning driver	Winning entrant
1	R1	(New South Wales) Sydney Motorsports Park	20 November	(Australia) Tim Macrow	(Australia) Tim Macrow	(Australia) Tim Macrow	Tim Macrow Racing
1	R2	(New South Wales) Sydney Motorsports Park	20 November		(Spain) Roberto Merhi	(Spain) Roberto Merhi	Team BRM
1	R3	(New South Wales) Sydney Motorsports Park	21 November		(Australia) Nathan Herne	(Australia) Aaron Cameron	Garry Rogers Motorsport
2	R4	(New South Wales) Mount Panorama Circuit	2 December	(Australia) Aaron Cameron	(Australia) James Golding	(Australia) James Golding	Garry Rogers Motorsport
2	R5	(New South Wales) Mount Panorama Circuit	3 December		(Australia) Tim Macrow	(Australia) Tim Macrow	Tim Macrow Racing
2	R6	(New South Wales) Mount Panorama Circuit	4 December		(Australia) Nathan Herne	(Australia) James Golding	Garry Rogers Motorsport
2	R7	(New South Wales) Mount Panorama Circuit	5 December		race abandoned		

== Drivers' standings ==
Each of the two rounds started with a qualifying session, awarding ten points for pole position down to one point for 10th. The grid of the first race was based on this qualifying result, with 30 points being awarded to the winner. The middle races of each round reversed the qualifying results, with the top 75% reversed for R2 and R5 and the top 50% reversed for R6 respectively, all awarding 20 points to the winner. The last race of each weekend marked the most important one, with a grid based on points scored over all previous weekend sessions and 60 points on offer for the winner.

Position	1st	2nd	3rd	4th	5th	6th	7th	8th	9th	10th	11th	Ret
Qualifying	10	9	8	7	6	5	4	3	2	1	0	0
First race (R1, R4)	30	27	24	22	20	18	16	14	12	n/a		0
Reversed grid races (R2, R5, R6)	20	18	16	14	12	10	9	8	7	6	5	0
Main event (R3, R7)	60	50	40	32	26	24	22	20	18	16	14	0

Pos.	Driver	SYD				BAT					Points
Pos.	Driver	Q	R1	R2	R3	Q	R4	R5	R6	R7	Points
1	(Australia) Aaron Cameron	6	4	2	1	1	3	6	3	C	165
2	(Spain) Roberto Merhi	5	5	1	3	6	4	2	5	C	143
3	(Australia) James Golding	3	3	8	6	2	1	5	1	C	136
4	(Australia) Luis Leeds	2	2	6	5	8	Ret	3	4	C	105
5	(Australia) Joey Mawson	12	Ret	9	2	3	5	Ret	9	C	92
6	(Australia) Tim Macrow	1	1	4	4	7	Ret	1	7	C	89
7	(Australia) Nathan Herne	4	Ret	5	Ret	4	2	4	2	C	85
8	(Australia) Blake Purdie	7	Ret	7	7	9	7	9	6	C	69
9	(Australia) Jordan Boys	8	6	DSQ	9	10	6	8	Ret	C	66
10	(Australia) Cooper Webster	9	7	3	11						48
11	(Japan) Yoshiaki Katayama	11	8	Ret	8	DNP	8	Ret	Ret	C	48
12	(Australia) Ben Bargwanna	10	9	10	10						35
13	(Australia) John Martin					5	Ret	7	8	C	21
Pos.	Driver	SYD				BAT					Points

== See also ==
- 2021 S5000 Australian Drivers' Championship
