= Aaron Cameron =

Australian racing driver (born 2000)

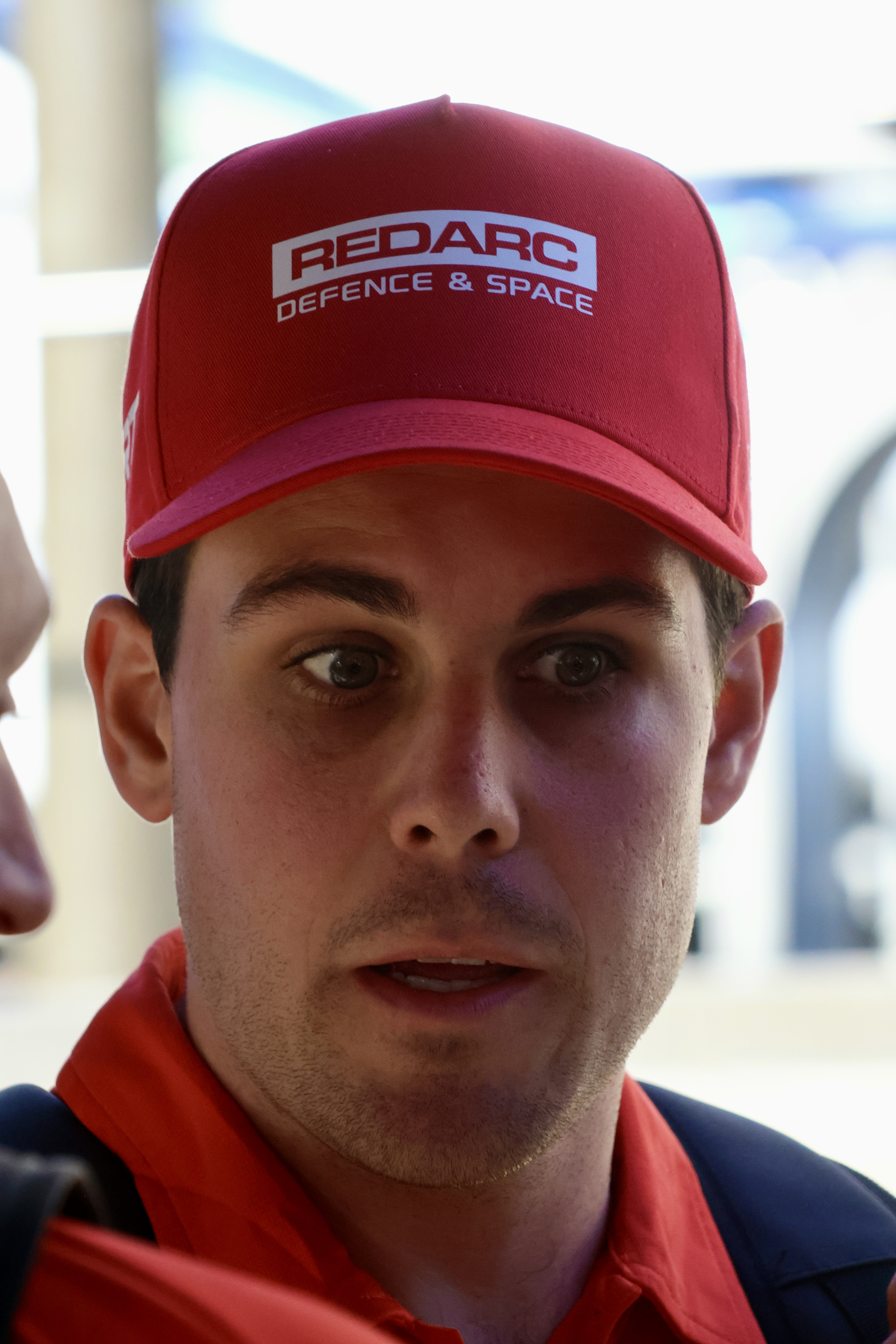
- Aaron Cameron at the Adelaide Grand Final in 2025
- Nationality: (Australia) Australian
- Born: Aaron Rhys Cameron; 27 January 2000 (age 26) Ferntree Gully, Victoria, Australia

Supercars Championship career
- Debut season: 2024
- Current team: Blanchard Racing Team
- Categorisation: FIA Silver (until 2026); FIA Gold (2027–)
- Car number: 3
- Starts: 58
- Championships: 0
- Wins: 0
- Podiums: 1
- Poles: 0
- Fastest laps: 0
- Best finish: 22nd in 2025

Previous series
- 2016-17 2017-18 2018 2018-19 2019-24 2021-23 2023 2023-24 2025 2025: Australian Formula Ford; Toyota 86 Racing Series; SuperUtes Series; Australian Production Car; TCR Australia; Australian S5000; TCR World Tour; Super2 Series; FR Middle East; GT4 Australia Series

Championship titles
- 2018 2021 & 23 2023 2023: Australian KZ2 Kart C/Ship; Tasman Series; Aust. Drivers Championship; Australian S5000

Awards
- 2018 2024: John Pizarro Trophy; Mike Kable Young Gun Award

Aaron Rhys Cameron (born 27 January 2000) is an Australian racing driver, competing in the Supercars Championship in the No. 3 Ford Mustang S650 for Blanchard Racing Team.

== Early career ==
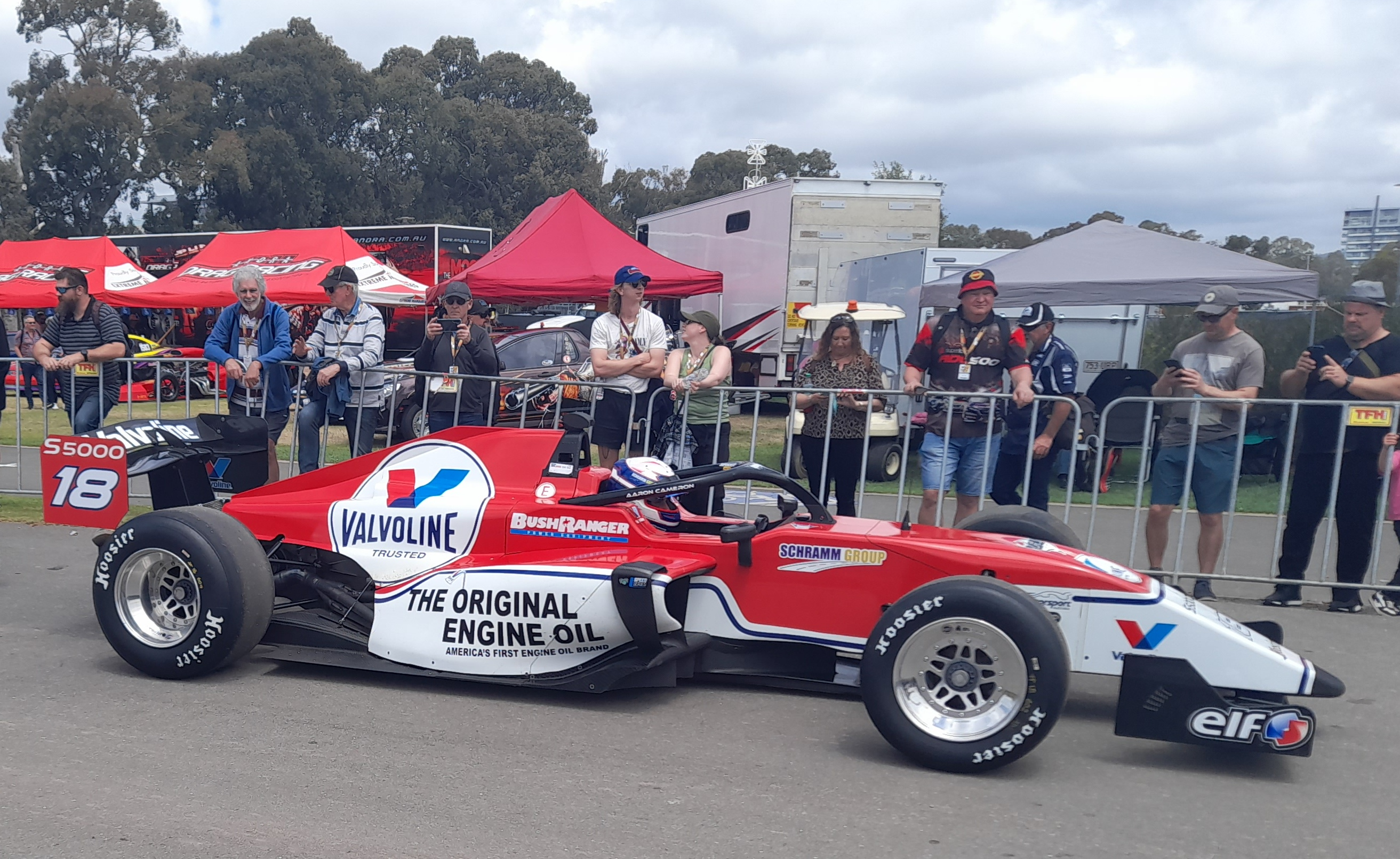
Cameron won the 2023 S5000 Australian Drivers' Championship driving for Garry Rogers Motorsport

The career of Cameron in the world of racing started in karting in his native state of Victoria, where his first successful year was when he was fourteen years old in 2014. In 2015, as well as moving up to the national level, he competed in selected races in Europe, including the Rotax Max Challenge Grand Finals and the KF-Junior category of the Karting World Championship.

Cameron made his first step out of karts in 2016, competing in the Victorian Formula Ford Championship, where he finished third, and two rounds of the 2016 Australian Formula Ford Championship.

2017 saw Cameron race in several grassroots and amateur categories in addition to Formula Ford and karts, including the Toyota 86 Racing Series, the V8 Ute Racing Series, the Keema Cars Excel Cup (a one-make competition for the Hyundai Excel X3), and a one-make endurance race for the Holden HQ Kingswood.

In 2018, Cameron won the KZ2 title in the Australian Kart Championship, driving for James Courtney's team, JC Kart. He also competed in the 2018 SuperUtes Series, finishing fifth overall.

== Touring car career ==
Cameron made his TCR debut in the 2018 24 Hours of Barcelona, one of five drivers for MARC Cars Australia in the No. 138 Audi RS 3 LMS TCR. However, the team was forced to retire nine hours into the race, and as they had not completed 60% of the total distance, they were not classified in the final results.

On 16 May 2019, Cameron was announced as the driver of the No. 2 Volkswagen Golf GTI TCR for Melbourne Performance Centre in the inaugural season of the TCR Australia Series. He won his first race in the series in the final round, achieving victory in the penultimate race at The Bend Motorsport Park. He finished the season in third place, behind Will Brown in first and Tony D'Alberto in second.

For the 2020 season, Cameron was signed by Garry Rogers Motorsport to drive a Peugeot 308 TCR under the banner of Team Valvoline GRM. He continued at Garry Rogers Motorsport for the next four years, with his best season coming in 2021 where he finished runner up.

=== Supercars ===
In 2024, Cameron joined the Super2 Series driving for Kelly Racing finishing runner up to Zach Bates. This led to an endurance seat at Blanchard Racing Team in the 2024 Supercars Championship and winning the Mike Kable Young Gun Award

== Career results ==
=== Karting career summary ===
Season	Series	Position
2013	Victorian Closed Kart Titles - Junior National Light	**3rd**
2014	Australian National Sprint Kart Championship - Junior National Heavy	4th
2015	Rotax Max Challenge Grand Finals - Rotax Junior	31st
2015	FIA World Kart Championship - KF Junior	52nd
2015	WSK - Super Masters Finals - KF Junior	83rd
2015	Victorian State Kart Championship - Junior Clubman	4th
2015	Victorian State Kart Championship - Junior Max	**3rd**
2016	Race of Stars - KZ2	15th
2016	Australian Kart Championship - KZ2	5th
2017	Race of Stars - KZ2	5th
2017	Australian Kart Championship - KZ2	4th
2017	FIA International Super Cup - KZ2	53rd
2018	Race of Stars - KZ2	7th
2018	Australian Kart Championship - KZ2	**1st**
2019	Macao International Kart Grand Prix - KZ	5th

=== Career summary ===
Season	Series	Team	Races	Wins	Poles	F/Laps	Podiums	Points	Position
2016	Victorian Formula Ford Championship	Borland Racing Developments	15	0	1	2	11	374	**3rd**
2016	Australian Formula Ford Series	Aaron Cameron	5	0	0	0	0	39	18th
2016	Heritage Touring Cars - Group C		5	0	0	0	0	16	24th
2017	Victorian Formula Ford Championship		3	0	0	0	0	39	23rd
2017	Australian Formula Ford Series		5	1	1	0	2	50	15th
2017	Australian V8 Ute Racing Series	Peters Motorsport	6	0	0	0	2	270	17th
2017	Australian GT Trophy Series - MARC class	MARC Cars Australia	2	2	0	1	2	218	**1st**
2017	Keema Cars Excel Cup		11	0	0	0	0	67	22nd
2017	Toyota 86 Racing Series		10	0	0	0	0	406	21st
2018	SuperUtes Series	Peters Motorsport	24	1	0	3	6	935	5th
2018	Heritage Touring Cars - Group C		3	1	1	1	2	22	20th
2018	Toyota 86 Racing Series	melbas.com.au	3	0	0	0	0	136	43rd
2018	Australian Production Car Series	Red Hot Couriers Racing	2	0	0	0	0	5	60th
2019	TCR Australia Touring Car Series	Melbourne Performance Centre	21	1	0	1	6	553	**3rd**
2019	Heritage Touring Cars - Group C		8	1	1	1	6	69	5th
2019	Australian Production Car Series	Aaron Cameron Racing	2	0	0	0	0	50	19th
2019	24H TCE Series - TCR	Team Dynamics with WRC Developments	1	0	0	0	0	0	NC
2021	TCR Australia Touring Car Series	GRM Team Valvoline	15	1	0	1	6	453	**2nd**
2021	Supercheap Auto TCR Baskerville Invitational	GRM Team Valvoline	4	2	0	2	4	134	**1st**
2021	S5000 Tasman Series	GRM Team Valvoline	6	1	1	0	4	165	**1st**
2022	TCR Australia Touring Car Series	Peugeot Sport GRM Team Valvoline	19	2	1	1	4	579	8th
2022	S5000 Australian Drivers' Championship	Valvoline Garry Rogers Motorsport	9	2	0	2	5	278	5th
2023	TCR Australia Touring Car Series	GRM Team Valvoline	21	1	0	0	8	743	4th
2023	TCR World Tour	GRM Team Valvoline	6	0	0	0	1	61	15th
2023	S5000 Australian Drivers' Championship	Garry Rogers Motorsport	18	7	3	4	12	616	**1st**
2023	S5000 Tasman Series	Garry Rogers Motorsport	3	3	1	3	3	130	**1st**
2023	Super2 Series	SCHRAMM Group Racing	6	0	0	0	0	540	18th
2024	TCR Australia Touring Car Series	GRM Team Valvoline	16	1	0	2	3	475	10th
2024	Super2 Series	Kelly Racing	12	2	2	2	4	1359	**2nd**
2024	Supercars Championship	Blanchard Racing Team	2	0	0	0	0	180	49th
2025	Formula Regional Middle East Championship	Evans GP	11	0	0	0	0	8	18th
2025	Supercars Championship	Blanchard Racing Team	30	0	0	0	0	874	22nd
2025	GT4 Australia Series - Silver-Am	Multispares Racing	3	0	0	0	2	42	8th
2026	Supercars Championship	Blanchard Racing Team	21	0	0	0	1	516*	21st*
2026	GT4 Australia Series - Silver	Multispares Racing	9	1	1	1	3	99*	4th*
2026	Mustang Cup Australia	Garry Rogers Motorsport	2	1	2	1	2	116*	9th*
2026	Nankang World Excel Enduro	Caleb Paterson	2	1	0	0	2	N/A	**1st**

=== Complete S5000 results ===
Year	Series	Team	1	2	3	4	5	6	7	8	9	10	11	12	13	14	15	16	17	18	Position	Points
2021	Tasman	Garry Rogers Motorsport	SMP; R1; 4	SMP; R2; 2	SMP; R3; 1	BAT; R4; **3**	BAT; R5; 6	BAT; R6; 3	BAT; R7; C												1st	165
2022	Australian	Garry Rogers Motorsport	SYM; R1	SYM; R2	SYM; R3	PHI; R4	PHI; R5	PHI; R6	MEL; R7; 2	MEL; R8; 8	MEL; R9; 4	SMP; R10; 2	SMP; R11; Ret	SMP; R12; 1	HID; R13; 3	HID; R14; 4	HID; R15; 1				5th	278
2022	Tasman	Garry Rogers Motorsport	SUR; R1	SUR; R2	SUR; R3	**ADL**; **R4**; **Ret**	ADL; R5; 6	ADL; R6; 1													8th	88
2023	Australian	Garry Rogers Motorsport	SYM; R1; 2	SYM; R2; 6	SYM; R3; 4	PHI; R4; 4	PHI; R5; 7	PHI; R6; 4	WIN; R7; 5	WIN; R8; 3	WIN; R9; 3	**SMP**; **R10**; **1**	SMP; R11; 1	SMP; R12; 1	**BEN**; **R13**; **2**	BEN; R14; 2	BEN; R15; 1	**ADL**; **R4**; **1'**	ADL; R5; 1	ADL; R6; 1	1st	616

=== Complete Formula Regional Middle East Championship results ===
(key) (Races in bold indicate pole position) (Races in italics indicate fastest lap)

Year	Entrant	1	2	3	4	5	6	7	8	9	10	11	12	13	14	15	DC	Points
2025	Evans GP	YMC1; 1; 13	YMC1; 2; 11	YMC1; 3; 12	YMC2; 1; 18	YMC2; 2 DNS	YMC2; 3 Ret	DUB; 1; 24	DUB; 2; 20	DUB; 3 Ret	YMC3; 1; 12	YMC3; 2; 19	YMC3; 3; 9	LUS; 1 WD	LUS; 2 WD	LUS; 3 WD	18th	8

=== TCR Australia results ===
TCR Australia results
Year	Team	Car	1	2	3	4	5	6	7	8	9	10	11	12	13	14	15	16	17	18	19	20	21	Position	Points
2019	Melbourne Performance Centre	Volkswagen Golf GTI TCR	SMP; R1; 7	SMP; R2; 10	SMP; R3; 4	PHI; R4; 12	PHI; R5; 7	PHI; R6; 3	BEN; R7; 12	BEN; R8; Ret	BEN; R9; 13	QLD; R10; 6	QLD; R11; 3	QLD; R12; 5	WIN; R13; 5	WIN; R14; 3	WIN; R15; 2	SAN; R16; 9	SAN; R17; 5	SAN; R18; 6	BEN; R19; 2	BEN; R20; 1	**BEN**; **R21**; **10**	3rd	553
2021	GRM Team Valvoline	Peugeot 308 TCR	SYM; R1; 4	SYM; R2; 15	SYM; R3; 8	PHI; R4; 6	PHI; R5; 7	PHI; R6; 10	BAT; R7; 2	BAT; R8; 2	BAT; R9; 2	SMP; R10; 9	SMP; R11; 11	SMP; R12; Ret	BAT; R13; 1	**BAT**; **R14**; **2**	BAT; R15; 2							2nd	453
2022	Peugeot Sport GRM Team Valvoline	Peugeot 308 TCR	SYM; R1; 5	SYM; R2; Ret	SYM; R3; 9	PHI; R4; 6	PHI; R5; Ret	PHI; R6; 10	BAT; R7; **1**	BAT; R8; 9	BAT; R9; 1	SMP; R10; 2	SMP; R11; 13	SMP; R12; 11	QLD; R13; 13	QLD; R14; 16	QLD; R15; 15	SAN; R16; 1	SAN; R17; Ret	SAN; R18; DNS	BAT; R19; 4	BAT; R20; C	BAT; R21; 4	8th	579
2023	Peugeot Sport GRM Team Valvoline	Peugeot 308 TCR	SYM; R1; 8	SYM; R2; 1	SYM; R3; 4	PHI; R4; 3	PHI; R5; 6	PHI; R6; 6	WIN; R7; 14	WIN; R8; 8	WIN; R9; 10	QLD; R10; 7	QLD; R11; 2	QLD; R12; 2	SAN; R13; 2	SAN; R14; 2	SAN; R15; 2	SMP; R16; 7	SMP; R17; 8	SMP; R18; 12	BAT; R19; 9	BAT; R20; 2	BAT; R21; Ret	4th	743
2024	Garry Rogers Motorsport	Peugeot 308 TCR	SAN; R1; 13	SAN; R2; 8	SAN; R3; 8	SYM; R4; 7	SYM; R5; 12	SYM; R6; 5	PHI; R7; 8	PHI; R8; 2	PHI; R9; 10	BND; R10; 5	BND; R11; 9	BND; R12; 11	QLD; R13; 2	QLD; R14; 13	QLD; R15; 5	SMP; R16; Ret	SMP; R17; 5	SMP; R18; 3				10th	475
2024	Garry Rogers Motorsport	Peugeot 308 P51 TCR																			BAT; R19; Ret	BAT; R20; DNS	BAT; R21; DNS	10th	475

=== Super2 Series results ===
(key) (Race results only)

Super2 Series results
Year	Team	No.	Car	1	2	3	4	5	6	7	8	9	10	11	12	Position	Points
2023	SCHRAMM Group Racing	27	Ford Mustang S550	NEW; R1	NEW; R2	PER; R1	PER; R2	TSV; R1	TSV; R2	SAN; R1; 6	SAN; R2; 10	BAT; R1; 6	BAT; R2; 7	ADE; R1; 9	ADE; R2; 10	18th	540
2024	Kelly Racing	27	Ford Mustang S550	BAT; R1; 2	BAT; R2; 4	WAN; R3; 5	WAN; R4; 5	TOW; R5; 2	TOW; R6; 12	SAN; R7; 5	SAN; R8; 8	BAT; R9; 15	BAT; R10; 1	ADE; R11; 1	**ADE**; **R12**; 5	2nd	1359

=== Supercars Championship results ===
(key) (Races in bold indicate pole position) (Races in italics indicate fastest lap)

Supercars results
Year	Team	No.	Car	1	2	3	4	5	6	7	8	9	10	11	12	13	14	15	16	17	18	19	20	21	22	23	24	25	26	27	28	29	30	31	32	33	34	35	36	37	Position	Points
2024	Blanchard Racing Team	3	Ford Mustang S650	BAT1; R1	BAT1; R2	MEL; R3	MEL; R4	MEL; R5	MEL; R6	TAU; R7	TAU; R8	BAR; R9	BAR; R10	HID; R11	HID; R12	TOW; R13	TOW; R14	SMP; R15	SMP; R16	BEN; R17	BEN; R18	SAN; R19; 17	BAT; R20; 23	SUR; R21	SUR; R22	ADE; R23	ADE; R24														48th	180
2025	Blanchard Racing Team	3	Ford Mustang S650	SYD; R1	SYD; R2	SYD; R3	MEL; R4; 22	MEL; R5; 19	MEL; R6; 20	MEL; R7; C	TAU; R8; 20	TAU; R9; 24	TAU; R10; 21	SYM; R11; 21	SYM; R12; 24	SYM; R13; 19	BAR; R14; 25	BAR; R15; 18	BAR; R16; 19	HID; R17; 20	HID; R18; 20	HID; R19; 22	TOW; R20; 23	TOW; R21; 18	TOW; R22; 19	QLD; R23; 9	QLD; R24; 22	QLD; R25; 19	BEN; R26; 24	BAT; R27; 9	SUR; R28; 17	SUR; R29; 10	SAN; R30; 22	SAN; R31; 12	ADE; R32; 19	ADE; R33; Ret	ADE; R34; 15				22nd	874
2026	Blanchard Racing Team	3	Ford Mustang S650	SMP; R1; 2	SMP; R2; 15	SMP; R3; 17	MEL; R4; 23	MEL; R5; 24	MEL; R6; 20	MEL; R7; 19	TAU; R8; 20	TAU; R9; 15 (Note: Aaron Cameron was stripped of his Race 9 points but kept his 15th-place finish due to a technical infringement.)	CHR; R10; 20	CHR; R11; 9	CHR; R12; 21	CHR; R13; Ret	SYM; R14; 23	SYM; R15; 15	SYM; R16; 7	HID; R20; 17	HID; R21; 21	HID; R22; 16	TOW; R23; 20	TOW; R24; 15	TOW; R25; Ret	BAR; R17; 16	BAR; R18; 21	BAR; R19; 7	QLD; R26; 16	QLD; R27; 12	QLD; R28; 10	BEN; R28; DSQ	BAT; R30	SUR; R31	SUR; R32	SAN; R33	SAN; R34	ADE; R35	ADE; R36	ADE; R37	19th*	793*

=== Complete Bathurst 1000 results ===
Year	Team	Car	Co-driver	Position	Laps
2024	Blanchard Racing Team	Ford Mustang S650	(Australia) Aaron Love	23rd	160
2025	Blanchard Racing Team	Ford Mustang S650	(Australia) Zak Best	9th	161

=== Complete Bathurst 12 Hour results ===
Year	Team	Co-drivers	Car	Class	Laps	Pos.	Class pos.
2020	MARC Cars Australia	(Australia) Nick Percat (Australia) Broc Feeney	Ford Mustang MARC II V8	I-INV	310	15th	**1st**

=== Complete Bathurst 6 Hour results ===
Year	Team	Co-drivers	Car	Class	Laps	Pos.	Class pos.
2017	(Australia) Declan Kirkham Racing	(Australia) Declan Kirkham (Australia) Philip Kirkham	Mazda MX-6 GE LS	D	56	DNF	
2019	(Australia) Aaron Cameron Racing	(Australia) Kyle Gurton (Australia) Cooper Murray	Toyota 86 GT	D	121	13th	**1st**
2022	MARC Cars Australia	(Australia) Nicholas McLeod (Australia) Cameron McLeod	Ford Mustang MARC II V8	A2	121	20th	**2nd**

=== Complete Barcelona 24 Hour results ===
Year	Team	Co-drivers	Car	Class	Laps	Pos.	Class pos.
2018	MARC Cars Australia	(United Kingdom) James Kaye (United Kingdom) Rob Young (United Kingdom) Matt LeBreton (United Kingdom) Neil Garnham	Audi RS3 LMS TCR	TCR	221	DNF	

=== Complete Dubai 24 Hour results ===
Year	Team	Co-drivers	Car	Class	Laps	Pos.	Class pos.
2019	(United Kingdom) Team Dynamics	(United Kingdom) James Kaye (United Kingdom) William Neal (United Kingdom) Henry Neal (United Kingdom) Jake Giddings	Audi RS3 LMS TCR	TCR	179	DNF	

=== Complete Australian GT4 results ===
(key) (Races in bold indicate pole position) (Races in italics indicate fastest lap)

Year	Team	Car	Class	1	2	3	4	5	6	7	8	9	10	11	12	Pos	Points
2025	Multispares Racing	Ford Mustang GT4 (2024)	Silver-Am	PHI; 1	PHI; 2	SYD; 1	SYD; 2	QLD; 1; 8	QLD; 2 DNS	PHI; 1; 12	PHI; 2; 16	BEN; 1; 5	BEN; 2; 5	HMP; 1	HMP; 2	6th	83
2026	Multispares Racing	Ford Mustang GT4 (2024)	Silver	PHI; 1; 1	PHI; 2; 25	**BEN**; **1**; **15**	BEN; 2; 5	QLD; 1; 5	QLD; 2; 9	HID; 1; 4	HID; 2; 5	SYD; 1; 3	SYD; 2 DNS	ADL; 1	ADL; 2	4th	99

== Notes ==
Sporting positions
Preceded by Andy Booth	Tasman Series; Champion; 2021	Succeeded by Nathan Herne
Preceded by Joey Mawson	Australian Drivers' Championship; Champion; 2023	Succeeded by Damon Sterling
Preceded by Nathan Herne	Tasman Series; Champion; 2023	Succeeded by Christian Mansell
Awards and achievements
Preceded by Joshua Fife	John Pizarro Perpetual Karting Trophy; 2018	Succeeded by Troy Loeskow
Preceded by Cameron McLeod	Mike Kable Young Gun Award; 2024	Succeeded by Incumbent
