= Joey Mawson =

Australian racing driver

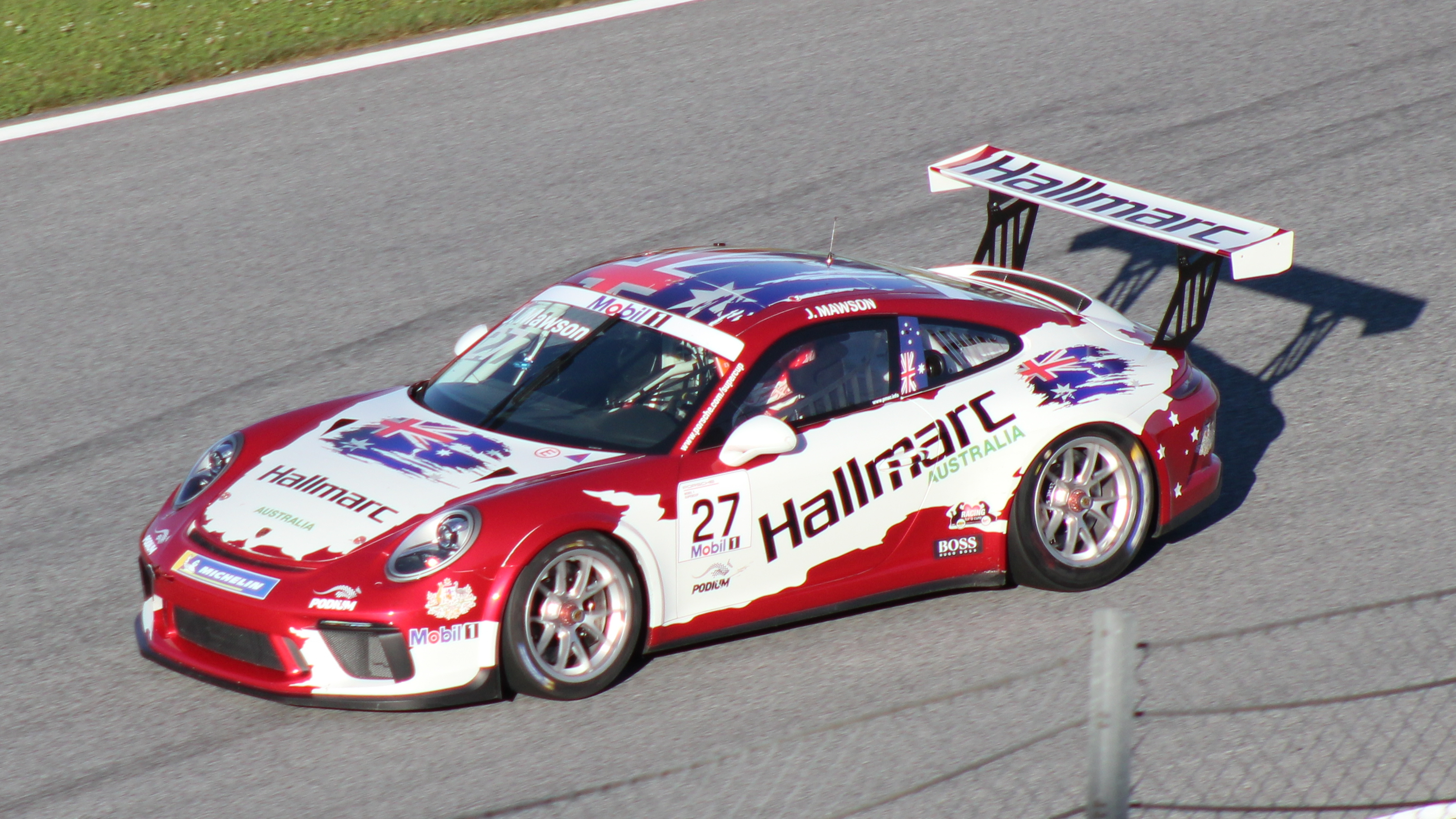
- Mawson at the Red Bull Ring in 2019
- Nationality: Australian
- Born: Joseph Terry Mawson; 27 March 1996 (age 30) Sydney, Australia
- Categorisation: FIA Gold

Previous series
- 2021 2021-22 2020 2019 2018 2017 2016 2015-16 2014: S5000 Tasman Series; S5000 Australia; Porsche Carrera Cup Germany; Porsche Supercup; GP3 Series; European Formula 3 Championship; BRDC British F3 Autumn Trophy; ADAC Formula 4 French F4 Championship; Karting

Championship titles
- 2021-22 2021-22 2016 2011 2011 2010 2010: Australian Gold Star; S5000 Australia; ADAC Formula 4 Australian Rotax - JMA Light; Australian Rotax - JMA Heavy; Australian Karting - Jr Clubman; Australian Karting - Jr National Light

Awards
- 2015-16: Motorsport Australia Young Driver of the Year

Joseph Terry Mawson (born 27 March 1996 in Sydney) is an Australian racing driver of Peruvian descent. He is a double champion of the Australian S5000 Championship, and previously beat Mick Schumacher to the ADAC Formula 4 title in 2016. He reached the GP3 Series and Porsche Supercup.

Between 2023 and 2026, Mawson served a three-year competition ban for a doping violation.

== Career ==
Mawson started his career in karting at the age of seven, and soon began to dominate the Junior karting scene, winning nineteen state and three national titles between 2003 and 2012. He also finished second in the Junior Max category at the 2011 Rotax World Championships, and was named Australia's best karter in 2010 by various media.

=== Europe ===
Mawson made his open-wheel debut in French F4 in 2014, qualifying on pole and winning on debut at the inaugural round at the Bugatti Circuit. He completed all but the final round of the season, finishing fourth having amassed 188 points along with three wins. In 2015, he moved to ADAC Formula 4 where he joined Van Amersfoort Racing alongside Harrison Newey and Mick Schumacher. Despite the pressure from his highly rated teammates he beat them both in the championship, finishing third with five wins, finishing two points shy of second place.

In 2016, Mawson remained with VAR in ADAC Formula 4. He won ten out of 24 races on his way to the title, beating now Prema driver Schumacher by 52 points. As a result, he was given the opportunity test one of VAR's European F3 cars at Monza, managing to trade fastest laps with Lando Norris.

In 2017, Mawson graduated to European Formula 3, whilst continuing his collaboration with VAR. However, he struggled throughout the season, finishing only thirteenth in the standings with one podium finish at the Nürburgring.

In 2018, Mawson contested the final season of the GP3 Series with Arden International. He finished the season thirteenth with two podiums. One each in France and Russia.

In 2019, Mawson switched to the Porsche ladder, contesting the Supercup with Team Australia. He additionally competed in a handful of Porsche Carrera Cup Germany races at the end of 2019 ahead of a full campaign in 2020.

=== Australia ===
Mawson returned to Australia in 2021 as a late entry into the S5000 Championship. He completed the season and won the championship with three race wins ahead of Thomas Randle, and defended his title in 2022.

==== Anti-doping violation ====
In June 2023, halfway during the 2023 S5000 season, Mawson was provisionally suspended by Motorsport Australia for failing a doping test. In September 2024, Mawson was issued with a three-year competition ban backdated to May 2023 for an anti-doping rule violation for testing positive for meldonium contained within a supplement he had used.

== Personal life ==
In 2025, Mawson was accused of raping a nurse at Michael Schumacher's mansion in Geneva in 2019. He was acquitted in June 2026—the court citing "insufficient evidence" to convict.

== Racing record ==
=== Karting career summary ===
| Season | Series | Position |
|---|---|---|
| 2008 | NSW Open Sprint Kart Championships - Junior National Light | **3rd** |
| 2008 | Queensland Sprint Kart Championships - Junior National Light | 4th |
| 2009 | Australian National Sprint Kart Championship - Junior National Heavy | 5th |
| 2009 | Australian National Sprint Kart Championship - Junior National Light | 4th |
| 2009 | Queensland Sprint Kart Championship - Junior National Light | 4th |
| 2010 | Australian National Sprint Kart Championship - Junior National Light | **1st** |
| 2010 | Australian National Sprint Kart Championship - Junior Clubman | **1st** |
| 2010 | Queensland Karting Championship - Junior Max | 4th |
| 2010 | Queensland Karting Championship - Junior Clubman | **1st** |
| 2010 | New South Wales Karting Championship - Junior Clubman | **1st** |
| 2010 | New South Wales Karting Championship - Junior Max | **1st** |
| 2010 | South Australian Karting Championship - Junior Max | **1st** |
| 2010 | SKUSA SuperNationals XIV - TaG Junior | 5th |
| 2011 | Australian National Sprint Kart Championship - Junior National Heavy | **3rd** |
| 2011 | Australian National Sprint Kart Championship - Junior Clubman | 4th |
| 2011 | Rotax Max Challenge Grand Finals - Junior | **2nd** |
| 2011 | Australian Rotax Nationals - Formula JMA Light | **1st** |
| 2011 | Australian Rotax Nationals - Formula JMA Heavy | **1st** |
| 2012 | Rotax Max Challenge Grand Finals - Senior | 6th |
| 2012 | CIK-FIA U18 World Karting Championship | 4th |
| 2012 | Australian Rotax Nationals - Rotax Light | **2nd** |
| 2013 | CIK-FIA European Championship KF | 45th |
| 2013 | CIK-FIA World Championship - KF | 25th |
| 2013 | IAME International Final - X30 Senior | 13th |

=== Circuit career summary ===
| Season | Series | Team | Races | Wins | Poles | F/laps | Podiums | Points | Position |
|---|---|---|---|---|---|---|---|---|---|
| 2014 | French F4 Championship | Auto Sport Academy | 18 | 3 | 3 | 3 | 8 | 188 | 4th |
| 2015 | ADAC Formula 4 Championship | Van Amersfoort Racing | 24 | 5 | 1 | 5 | 11 | 297 | **3rd** |
| 2016 | ADAC Formula 4 Championship | Van Amersfoort Racing | 24 | 10 | 8 | 6 | 16 | 374 | **1st** |
| 2016 | BRDC British Formula 3 Autumn Trophy | Douglas Motorsport | 3 | 0 | 0 | 1 | 3 | 82 | **2nd** |
| 2016–17 | MRF Challenge Formula 2000 Championship | MRF Racing | 16 | 3 | 2 | 4 | 12 | 277 | **2nd** |
| 2017 | FIA Formula 3 European Championship | Van Amersfoort Racing | 30 | 0 | 0 | 0 | 1 | 83 | 13th |
| 2017 | Euroformula Open Championship | BVM Racing | 2 | 0 | 0 | 0 | 0 | 0 | NC‡ |
| 2018 | GP3 Series | Arden International | 18 | 0 | 0 | 0 | 2 | 38 | 13th |
| 2019 | Radical Cup Australia | Shared Runaway Racing | 2 | 0 | 0 | 1 | 0 | 0 | NC‡ |
| 2019 | Formula Regional European Championship | Van Amersfoort Racing | 2 | 0 | 0 | 0 | 0 | 24 | 16th |
| 2019 | Porsche Supercup | Team Australia | 10 | 0 | 0 | 0 | 1 | 63 | 11th |
| 2019 | Porsche Carrera Cup Australia - Pro | Porsche Centre Melbourne | 1 | 0 | 0 | 0 | 0 | 14 | 17th |
| 2019 | Porsche Carrera Cup Germany | Team CARTECH Motorsport | 4 | 0 | 0 | 0 | 0 | 19 | 20th |
| 2019 | DMV-GTC Class 3 | Herberth Motorsport | 1 | 0 | 1 | 1 | 1 | 0 | NC‡ |
| 2020 | Porsche Carrera Cup Germany | Fach Auto Tech | 10 | 0 | 0 | 0 | 0 | 71 | 8th |
| 2021 | S5000 Australia Drivers Championship | Team BRM | 12 | 3 | 2 | 5 | 6 | 392 | **1st** |
| 2021 | S5000 Tasman Series | Team BRM | 6 | 0 | 0 | 0 | 1 | 92 | 5th |
| 2022 | S5000 Australian Drivers Championship | Team BRM | 15 | 4 | 1 | 4 | 8 | 428 | **1st** |
| 2022 | Intercontinental GT Challenge | Team BRM | 1 | 0 | 0 | 0 | 0 | 4 | 17th |
| 2022 | S5000 Tasman Series | Team BRM | 6 | 1 | 0 | 5 | 5 | 161 | **3rd** |
| 2023 | S5000 Australian Drivers' Championship | 88 Racing | 9 | 7 | 1 | 6 | 9 | 364 | 4th |

^{*} Season still in progress.
^{‡} Guest driver. Not eligible for points.

=== Complete French F4 Championship results ===
(key) (Races in bold indicate pole position) (Races in italics indicate fastest lap)

| Year | 1 | 2 | 3 | 4 | 5 | 6 | 7 | 8 | 9 | 10 | 11 | 12 | 13 | 14 | 15 | 16 | 17 | 18 | 19 | 20 | 21 | DC | Points |
|---|---|---|---|---|---|---|---|---|---|---|---|---|---|---|---|---|---|---|---|---|---|---|---|
| 2014 | **LMS**; **1**; 1 | LMS; 2; 3 | LMS; 3; 1 | PAU; 1 DSQ | PAU; 2; 17 | PAU; 3; 20† | VDV; 1; 6 | VDV; 2; 3 | VDV; 3 Ret | MAG; 1; 4 | MAG; 2; 3 | MAG; 3; 2 | NOG; 1; 9 | NOG; 2; 16 | NOG; 3; 8 | **JER**; **1**; 1 | JER; 2; 16 | **JER**; **3**; 2 | LEC; 1 | LEC; 2 | LEC; 3 | 4th | 188 |

=== Complete ADAC Formula 4 Championship results ===
(key) (Races in bold indicate pole position) (Races in italics indicate fastest lap)

| Year | Team | 1 | 2 | 3 | 4 | 5 | 6 | 7 | 8 | 9 | 10 | 11 | 12 | 13 | 14 | 15 | 16 | 17 | 18 | 19 | 20 | 21 | 22 | 23 | 24 | DC | Points |
|---|---|---|---|---|---|---|---|---|---|---|---|---|---|---|---|---|---|---|---|---|---|---|---|---|---|---|---|
| 2015 | Van Amersfoort Racing | OSC1; 1; 6 | OSC1; 2; 4 | OSC1; 3; 2 | RBR; 1; 10 | **RBR**; **2** Ret | RBR; 3; 1 | SPA; 1; 5 | SPA; 2; 7 | SPA; 3; 2 | LAU; 1; 1 | LAU; 2; 2 | LAU; 3; 2 | NÜR; 1; 8 | NÜR; 2; 8 | NÜR; 3; 7 | SAC; 1; 4 | SAC; 2; 3 | SAC; 3; 1 | OSC2; 1; 7 | OSC2; 2; 26 | OSC2; 3; 1 | HOC; 1; 10 | HOC; 2; 3 | HOC; 3; 1 | 3rd | 297 |
| 2016 | Van Amersfoort Racing | **OSC1**; **1**; 1 | **OSC1**; **2**; 1 | OSC1; 3; 2 | SAC; 1; 2 | SAC; 2; 3 | SAC; 3; 1 | LAU; 1; 6 | LAU; 2; 2 | LAU; 3; 23 | OSC2; 1; 1 | **OSC2**; **2**; 1 | OSC2; 3 Ret | RBR; 1; 4 | **RBR**; **2**; 1 | RBR; 3; 3 | NÜR; 1; 2 | **NÜR**; **2**; 1 | NÜR; 3; 28 | **ZAN**; **1**; 1 | ZAN; 2; 27 | ZAN; 3; 8 | HOC; 1; 1 | **HOC**; **2**; 1 | HOC; 3 Ret | 1st | 374 |

=== Complete MRF Challenge Formula 2000 Championship results ===
(key) (Races in bold indicate pole position) (Races in italics indicate fastest lap)

| Year | 1 | 2 | 3 | 4 | 5 | 6 | 7 | 8 | 9 | 10 | 11 | 12 | 13 | 14 | 15 | 16 | DC | Points |
|---|---|---|---|---|---|---|---|---|---|---|---|---|---|---|---|---|---|---|
| 2016–17 | BHR; 1; 3 | BHR; 2; 2 | BHR; 3; 2 | BHR; 4; 6 | **DUB**; **1**; 2 | DUB; 2; 2 | DUB; 3; 3 | DUB; 4; 1 | GNO; 1; 4 | GNO; 2; 1 | GNO; 3; 2 | GNO; 4; 3 | CHE; 1; 5 | CHE; 2; 1 | CHE; 3; 4 | CHE; 4; 3 | 2nd | 277 |

=== Complete FIA Formula 3 European Championship results ===
(key) (Races in bold indicate pole position) (Races in italics indicate fastest lap)

| Year | Entrant | Engine | 1 | 2 | 3 | 4 | 5 | 6 | 7 | 8 | 9 | 10 | 11 | 12 | 13 | 14 | 15 | 16 | 17 | 18 | 19 | 20 | 21 | 22 | 23 | 24 | 25 | 26 | 27 | 28 | 29 | 30 | DC | Points |
|---|---|---|---|---|---|---|---|---|---|---|---|---|---|---|---|---|---|---|---|---|---|---|---|---|---|---|---|---|---|---|---|---|---|---|
| 2017 | Van Amersfoort Racing | Mercedes | SIL; 1; 5 | SIL; 2; 11 | SIL; 3; 8 | MNZ; 1; 14 | MNZ; 2; 16 | MNZ; 3 Ret | PAU; 1 Ret | PAU; 2; 16 | PAU; 3 Ret | HUN; 1; 4 | HUN; 2; 7 | HUN; 3; 8 | NOR; 1 Ret | NOR; 2; 13 | NOR; 3; 11 | SPA; 1; 5 | SPA; 2; 10 | SPA; 3; 10 | ZAN; 1; 14 | ZAN; 2; 14 | ZAN; 3; 9 | NÜR; 1; 3 | NÜR; 2; 7 | NÜR; 3; 20 | RBR; 1; 18 | RBR; 2; 8 | RBR; 3; 7 | HOC; 1; 15 | HOC; 2; 15 | HOC; 3; 9 | 13th | 83 |

=== Complete GP3 Series results ===
(key) (Races in bold indicate pole position) (Races in italics indicate fastest lap)

| Year | Entrant | 1 | 2 | 3 | 4 | 5 | 6 | 7 | 8 | 9 | 10 | 11 | 12 | 13 | 14 | 15 | 16 | 17 | 18 | Pos | Points |
|---|---|---|---|---|---|---|---|---|---|---|---|---|---|---|---|---|---|---|---|---|---|
| 2018 | Arden International | CAT; FEA; 16 | CAT; SPR; 15 | LEC; FEA; 7 | LEC; SPR; 3 | RBR; FEA; Ret | RBR; SPR; 10 | SIL; FEA; 9 | SIL; SPR; 13 | HUN; FEA; Ret | HUN; SPR; 18‡ | SPA; FEA; 8 | SPA; SPR; 17† | MNZ; FEA; 12 | MNZ; SPR; 12 | SOC; FEA; 8 | SOC; SPR; 2 | YMC; FEA; 20 | YMC; SPR; 9 | 13th | 38 |

- † — Drivers did not finish the race, but were classified as they completed over 90% of the race distance.
- ‡ — Set fastest lap, but not awarded as finished outside of points position.

=== Complete Porsche Supercup results ===
(key) (Races in bold indicate pole position) (Races in italics indicate fastest lap)

| Year | Team | 1 | 2 | 3 | 4 | 5 | 6 | 7 | 8 | 9 | 10 | Pos. | Points |
|---|---|---|---|---|---|---|---|---|---|---|---|---|---|
| 2019 | Team Australia | CAT; 11 | MON; 13 | RBR; 12 | SIL; 9 | HOC; 7† | HUN; 9 | SPA; 11 | MNZ; 3 | MEX; 8 | MEX; 10 | 11th | 63 |

^{†} Race shortened. No points awarded.

=== Complete S5000 results ===
| Year | Series | Team | 1 | 2 | 3 | 4 | 5 | 6 | 7 | 8 | 9 | 10 | 11 | 12 | 13 | 14 | 15 | 16 | 17 | 18 | Position | Points |
|---|---|---|---|---|---|---|---|---|---|---|---|---|---|---|---|---|---|---|---|---|---|---|
| 2021 | Australian | Team BRM | SYM; R1; 1 | SYM; R2; 4 | SYM; R3; 4 | PHI; R4; 5 | PHI; R5; 3 | PHI; R6; 1 | SAN; R7; **5** | SAN; R8; 2 | SAN; R9; 1 | SMP; R10; **2** | SMP; R11; 5 | SMP; R12; 8 | | | | | | | 1st | 392 |
| 2021 | Tasman | Team BRM | SMP; R1; Ret | SMP; R2; 9 | SMP; R3; 2 | BAT; R4; 5 | BAT; R5; Ret | BAT; R6; 9 | BAT; R7; C | | | | | | | | | | | | 6th | 92 |
| 2022 | Australian | Team BRM | SYM; R1; 1 | SYM; R2; Ret | SYM; R3; 4 | PHI; R4; 2 | PHI; R5; 3 | PHI; R6; 1 | MEL; R7; **1** | MEL; R8; 10 | MEL; R9; 1 | SMP; R10; **1** | SMP; R11; 10 | SMP; R12; 2 | HID; R13; 4 | HID; R14; 6 | HID; R15; Ret | | | | 1st | 428 |
| 2022 | Tasman | Team BRM | SUR; R1; 2 | SUR; R2; 2 | SUR; R3; 2 | ADL; R4; 2 | ADL; R5; 1 | ADL; R6; Ret | | | | | | | | | | | | | 3rd | 161 |
| 2023 | Australian | 88 Racing | SYM; R1; **1** | SYM; R2; 1 | SYM; R3; 1 | PHI; R4; 1 | PHI; R5; 3 | PHI; R6; 2 | WIN; R7; 1 | WIN; R8; 1 | WIN; R9; 1 | SMP; R10; EX | SMP; R11; EX | SMP; R12; EX | BEN; R13 | BEN; R14 | BEN; R15 | ADL; R16 | ADL; R17 | ADL; R18 | 4th | 364 |

^{*} Season still in progress.

=== Complete Bathurst 12 Hour results ===
| Year | Team | Co-drivers | Car | Class | Laps | Pos. | Class pos. |
|---|---|---|---|---|---|---|---|
| 2022 | (Australia) Team BRM | (Australia) Nick Percat (Australia) Mark Rosser | Audi R8 LMS Evo II | A–GT3 Pro-Am | 284 | 8th | 8th |

Sporting positions
| Preceded by Marvin Dienst | ADAC Formula 4 Championship; Champion; 2016 | Succeeded by Jüri Vips |
| Preceded by Simon Hodge | Australian Drivers' Championship; Champion; 2021 & 2022 | Succeeded by Aaron Cameron |
Awards and achievements
| Preceded by Anton de Pasquale | Motorsport Australia; Young Driver of the Year Award; 2015-2016 | Succeeded by Cameron Shields |
