= Jordan Boys =

Australian racing driver

- Nationality: Australian
- Born: 10 November 1997 (age 29) Albury, New South Wales

Supercars Championship
- Years active: 2020–Current
- Teams: Brad Jones Racing; Image Racing
- Starts: 14
- Wins: 0
- Podiums: 0
- Poles: 0
- Fastest laps: 0
- Best finish: 28th in 2022

Jordan Boys (born 10 November 1997 in Albury) is a racing driver from Australia. He competed in 4 seasons in the Super2 Series for Image Racing. Jordan will debut in the S5000 Australian Drivers' Championship series at Sydney Motorsport Park with 88 Racing in November 2021.

== Career results ==
=== Karting career summary ===
Season	Series	Position
2008	Queensland Sprint Kart Championship - Midgets	3rd
2008	ACT Sprint Kart Championship - Midgets	1st
2008	Rene & Barney Smith Trophy	1st
2009	Queensland Sprint Kart Championship - Rookies	5th
2009	New South Wales Kart Titles - Rookies	4th
2009	South Australian Kart Championship - Rookies	4th
2009	City of Melbourne Kart Titles - Rookies	2nd
2010	Australian National Sprint Kart Championship - Junior National Light	5th
2011	Australian National Sprint Kart Championship - Junior National Light	3rd
2012	Australian Rotax Nationals - Rotax Junior	38th
2012	Australian National Sprint Kart Championship - Junior National Light	26th
2013	51st Australian National Sprint Kart Championship - Junior National Heavy	1st
2013	Australian National Sprint Kart Championship - Junior Clubman	11th
2014	Rotax Max Challenge Grand Finals - DD2	3rd
2015	Kartsport NZ National Sprint Championship - Rotax Max Light class	2nd
2015	Kartsport NZ National Sprint Championship - 100cc Yamaha Light class	2nd
2018	Australian National Sprint Kart Championship - KZ2	31st

=== Circuit racing career ===
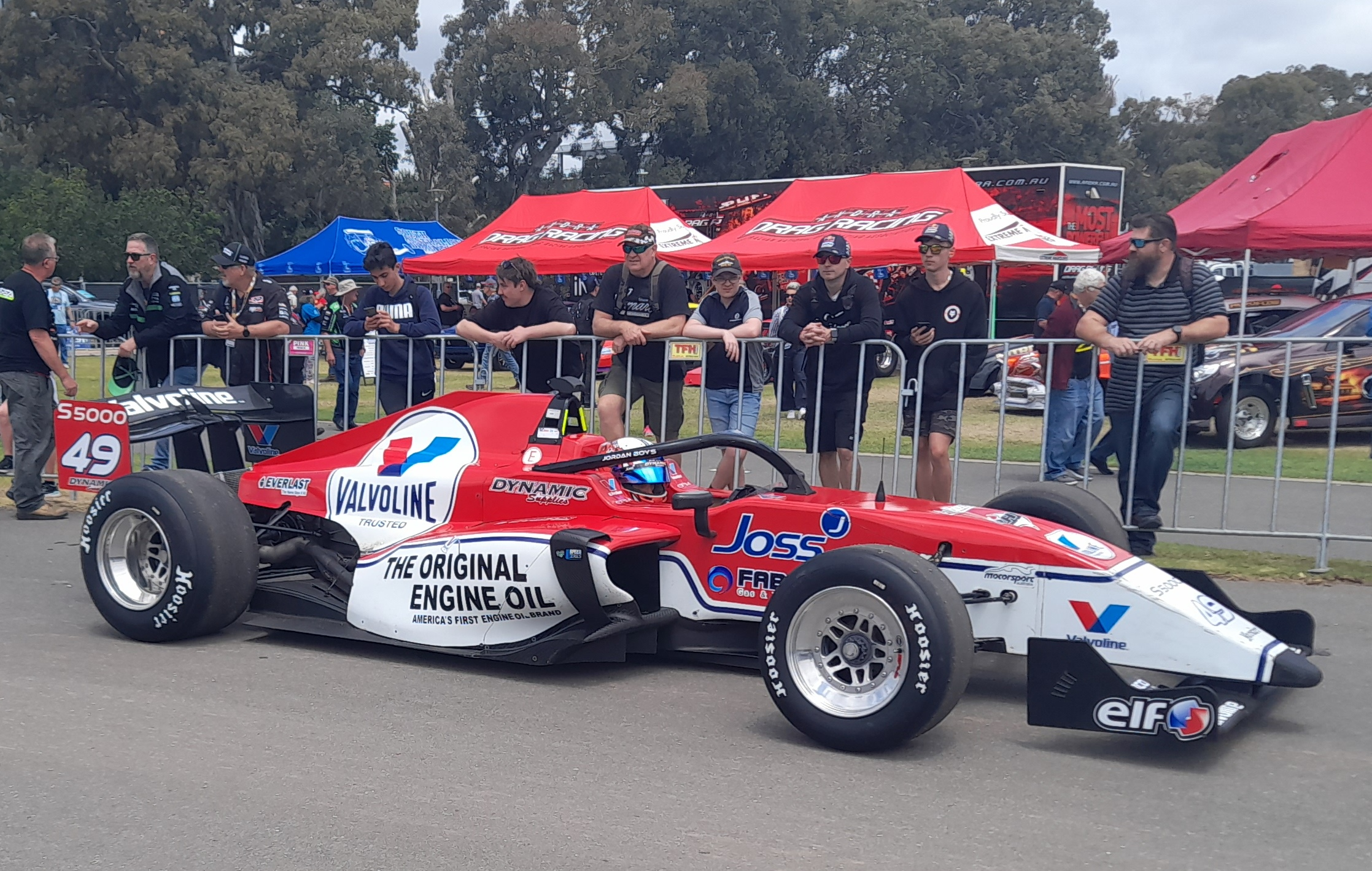
Jordan Boys paced second in the 2023 S5000 Australian Drivers' Championship driving for Garry Rogers Motorsport

Season	Series	Position	Car	Team
2015	Victorian Formula Ford Series	11th	Mygale-Ford SJ11A	Jordan Boys Motorsport
2016	Victorian Formula Ford Series	2nd	Mygale-Ford SJ11A	Jordan Boys Motorsport
2016	Australian Formula Ford Series	3rd	Mygale-Ford SJ11A	Jordan Boys Motorsport
2017	Australian V8 Touring Car Series	6th	Ford FG Falcon	Image Racing
2017	Dunlop Super2 Series	24th	Holden VF Commodore	Dragon Motor Racing
2018	Dunlop Super2 Series	22nd	Holden VF Commodore	Image Racing
2019	Dunlop Super2 Series	7th	Holden VF Commodore	Image Racing
2020	Dunlop Super2 Series	3rd	Holden VF Commodore	Image Racing
2021	Dunlop Super2 Series	7th	Holden VF Commodore	Image Racing
2021	S5000 Tasman Series	9th	Rogers AF01/V8	88Racing
2022	Supercars Championship	28th	Holden Commodore ZB	Image Racing; Brad Jones Racing
2022	S5000 Australia	14th	Rogers AF01/V8	Versa Motorsport
2022	S5000 Tasman Series	4th	Rogers AF01/V8	Garry Rogers Motorsport
2023	Supercars Championship	48th	Chevrolet Camaro ZL1	Brad Jones Racing
2023	S5000 Australia	2nd	Rogers AF01/V8	Garry Rogers Motorsport
2023	S5000 Tasman Series	2nd	Rogers AF01/V8	Garry Rogers Motorsport
2024	Supercars Championship	48th	Chevrolet Camaro ZL1	Brad Jones Racing
2024	Australian National Trans-Am Series	3rd	Ford Mustang	The Racing Academy
2025	Supercars Championship	47th	Chevrolet Camaro ZL1	Brad Jones Racing

=== Super3 Series results ===
(key) (Race results only)

Super3 Series results
Year	Team	No.	Car	1	2	3	4	5	6	7	8	9	10	11	12	13	14	15	Position	Points
2017	Image Racing	49	Ford FG Falcon	PHI; R1; 8	PHI; R2; 4	PHI; R3; 1	WIN; R4; 3	WIN; R5; 5	WIN; R6; 2	QLD; R7; 4	QLD; R8; 4	QLD; R9; 9	PHI; R10; Ret	PHI; R11; 8	PHI; R12; Ret	SMP; R13	SMP; R14	SMP; R15	6th	298
2018	Image Racing	49	Ford FG Falcon	PHI; R1	PHI; R2	PHI; R3	WIN; R4; 5	WIN; R5; 2	WIN; R6; Ret	SMP; R7	SMP; R8	SMP; R9	QLD; R10	QLD; R11	QLD; R12	BEN; R13	BEN; R14	BEN; R15	22nd	61

=== Super2 Series results ===
(key) (Race results only)

Super2 Series results
Year	Team	No.	Car	1	2	3	4	5	6	7	8	9	10	11	12	13	14	15	16	17	18	19	20	21	Position	Points
2017	Dragon Motor Racing	98	Holden VF Commodore	ADE; R1	ADE; R2	ADE; R3	SYM; R4	SYM; R5	SYM; R6	SYM; R7	PHI; R8	PHI; R9	PHI; R10	PHI; R11	TOW; R12	TOW; R13	SMP; R14	SMP; R15	SMP; R16	SMP; R17	SAN; R18; 13	SAN; R19; 8	NEW; R20; 16	NEW; R21; 7	24th	309
2018	Image Racing	49	Holden VF Commodore	ADE; R1; 20	ADE; R2; 15	ADE; R3; 20	SYM; R4; 13	SYM; R5; 23	SYM; R6; 11	BAR; R7; 22	BAR; R8; 22	BAR; R9; 19	TOW; R10; Ret	TOW; R11; 15	SAN; R12; 12	SAN; R13; Ret	BAT; R14; Ret	NEW; R15; 7	NEW; R16; C						22nd	525
2019	Image Racing	49	Holden VF Commodore	ADE; R1; Ret	ADE; R2; 11	ADE; R3; 20	BAR; R4; 9	BAR; R5; 11	TOW; R6; Ret	TOW; R7; Ret	QLD; R8; 16	QLD; R9; 9	BAT; R10; 7	SAN; R11; 13	SAN; R12; 1	NEW; R13; 3	NEW; R14; 1								7th	1062
2020	Image Racing	49	Holden VF Commodore	ADE; R1; 5	ADE; R2; 6	ADE; R3; 4	SYD; R4; 8	SYD; R5; 9	BAT; R6; 3	BAT; R7; 4															3rd	645
2021	Image Racing	49	Holden VF Commodore	BAT; R1; 3	BAT; R2; DSQ	TOW1; R3; 7	TOW1; R4; 5	TOW2; R5; 12	TOW2; R6; Ret	SMP; R7; 4	SMP; R8; C	BAT; R9; 3	BAT; R10; 1												7th	634

=== Supercars Championship results ===
Supercars results
Year	Team	No.	Car	1	2	3	4	5	6	7	8	9	10	11	12	13	14	15	16	17	18	19	20	21	22	23	24	25	26	27	28	29	30	31	32	33	34	Position	Points
2020	Brad Jones Racing	14	Holden ZB Commodore	ADE; R1	ADE; R2	MEL; R3; C	MEL; R4; C	MEL; R5; C	MEL; R6; C	SMP1; R7	SMP1; R8	SMP1; R9	SMP2; R10	SMP2; R11	SMP2; R12	HID1; R13	HID1; R14	HID1; R15	HID2; R16	HID2; R17	HID2; R18	TOW1; R19	TOW1; R20	TOW1; R21	TOW2; R22	TOW2; R23	TOW2; R24	BEN1; R25	BEN1; R26	BEN1; R27	BEN2; R28; PO	BEN2; R29; PO	BEN2; R30; PO	BAT; R31; Ret				N/A	0
2022	Image Racing	49	Holden ZB Commodore	SMP; R1	SMP; R2	SYM; R3	SYM; R4	SYM; R5	MEL; R6	MEL; R7	MEL; R8	MEL; R9	BAR; R10	BAR; R11	BAR; R12	WIN; R13; 25	WIN; R14; 25	WIN; R15; 24	HID; R16	HID; R17	HID; R18	TOW; R19	TOW; R20	BEN; R21; 25	BEN; R22; 11	BEN; R23; 16												28th	300
2022	Brad Jones Racing	96	Holden ZB Commodore																								SAN; R24; PO	SAN; R25; PO	SAN; R26; PO	PUK; R27	PUK; R28	PUK; R29	BAT; R30; 13	SUR; R31	SUR; R32	ADE; R33	ADE; R34	28th	300
2023	Brad Jones Racing	96	Chevrolet Camaro ZL1	NEW; R1	NEW; R2	MEL; R3	MEL; R4	MEL; R5	MEL; R6	BAR; R7	BAR; R8	BAR; R9	SYM; R10	SYM; R11	SYM; R12	HID; R13	HID; R14	HID; R15	TOW; R16	TOW; R17	SMP; R18	SMP; R19	BEN; R20	BEN; R21	BEN; R22	SAN; R23; 19	BAT; R24; 22	SUR; R25	SUR; R26	ADE; R27	ADE; R28							48th	174
2024	Brad Jones Racing	96	Chevrolet Camaro ZL1	BAT1; R1	BAT1; R2	MEL; R3	MEL; R4	MEL; R5	MEL; R6	TAU; R7	TAU; R8	BAR; R9	BAR; R10	HID; R11	HID; R12	TOW; R13	TOW; R14	SMP; R15	SMP; R16	BEN; R17	BEN; R18	SAN; R19; 21	BAT; R20; 13	SUR; R21	SUR; R22	ADE; R23	ADE; R24											45th	216
2025	Brad Jones Racing	96	Chevrolet Camaro ZL1	SYD; R1	SYD; R2	SYD; R3	MEL; R4	MEL; R5	MEL; R6	MEL; R7; C	TAU; R8	TAU; R9	TAU; R10	SYM; R11	SYM; R12	SYM; R13	BAR; R14	BAR; R15	BAR; R16	HID; R17	HID; R18	HID; R19	TOW; R20	TOW; R21	TOW; R22	QLD; R23	QLD; R24	QLD; R25	BEN; R26; 14	BAT; R27; 16	SUR; R28	SUR; R29	SAN; R30	SAN; R31	ADE; R32	ADE; R33	ADE; R34	40th*	101*

=== Complete Bathurst 1000 results ===
Year	Team	Car	Co-driver	Position	Laps
2020	Brad Jones Racing	Holden Commodore ZB	(Australia) Todd Hazelwood	DNF	50
2022	Brad Jones Racing	Holden Commodore ZB	(Australia) Macauley Jones	13th	161
2023	Brad Jones Racing	Chevrolet Camaro Mk.6	(Australia) Macauley Jones	22nd	149
2024	Brad Jones Racing	Chevrolet Camaro Mk.6	(Australia) Macauley Jones	13th	161
2025	Brad Jones Racing	Chevrolet Camaro Mk.6	(Australia) Macauley Jones	16th	159

=== Complete S5000 results ===
Year	Series	Team	1	2	3	4	5	6	7	8	9	10	11	12	13	14	15	16	17	18	Position	Points
2021	Tasman	88Racing	SMP; R1; 8	SMP; R2; DSQ	SMP; R3; 9	BAT; R4; 6	BAT; R5; 8	BAT; R6; Ret	BAT; R7; C												9th	66
2022	Australian	Versa Motorsport	SYM; R1	SYM; R2	SYM; R3	PHI; R4	PHI; R5	PHI; R6	MEL; R7	MEL; R8	MEL; R9	SMP; R10	SMP; R11	SMP; R12	HID; R13; 9	HID; R14; 8	HID; R15; 3				13th	64
2022	Tasman	Garry Rogers Motorsport	SUR; R1; 3	SUR; R2; 7	SUR; R3; 3	ADL; R4; 5	ADL; R5; 4	ADL; R6; 4													4th	87
2023	Australian	Garry Rogers Motorsport	SYM; R1; 4	SYM; R2; 5	SYM; R3; 7	PHI; R4; Ret	PHI; R5; 6	PHI; R6; 7	WIN; R7; 4	WIN; R8; 4	WIN; R9; 5	SMP; R10; 3	SMP; R11; 2	SMP; R12; 3	BEN; R13; 3	BEN; R14; 3	BEN; R15; 4	ADL; R16; 2	ADL; R17; 2	ADL; R18; 2	2nd	448

== External references ==
- Jordan Boys V8 Supercars Official Profile
- Jordan Boys career summary at DriverDB.com
- Jordan Boys driver statistics at Racing-Reference
