= Nathan Herne =

Australian racing driver (born 2002)

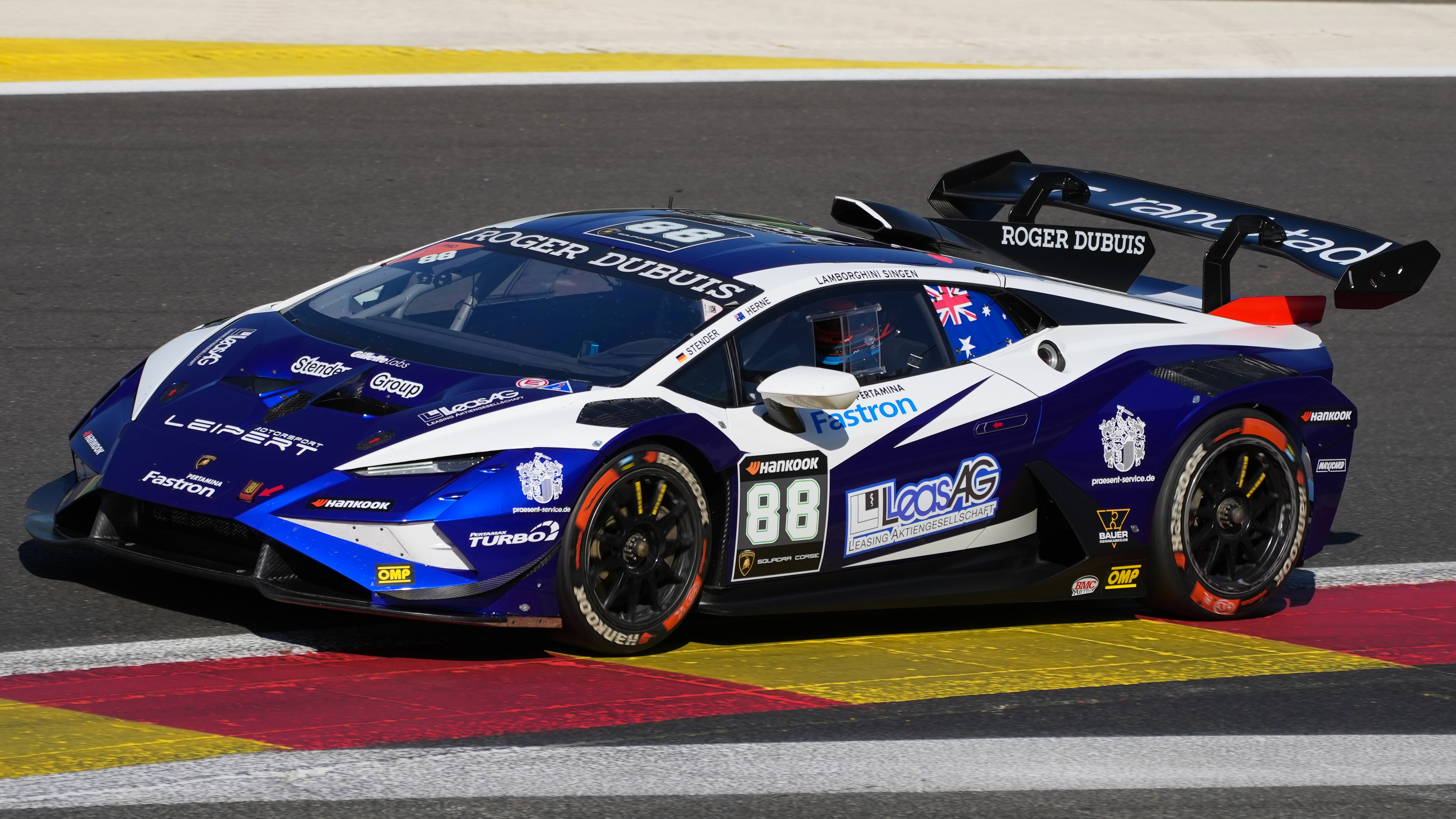
- Herne in 2024
- Nationality: (Australia) Australian
- Born: Nathan Stuart Alan Herne; 19 August 2002 (age 24) Lismore, New South Wales, Australia

Championship titles
- 2021–2022, 2026 2022 2020 2020 2020 2018 2018: Australian National Trans-Am Series; S5000 Tasman Series; Bathurst Tin Tops – TA2; Townsville Tin Tops – Super Tranz; Wake Up! Hostels Combined Sedans – TA2; New South Wales Formula Ford Championship – Fiesta; Victorian Formula Ford Championship – Fiesta

Nathan Stuart Alan Herne (born 19 August 2002) is an Australian racing driver who last competed in the Australian National Trans-Am Series for Garry Rogers Motorsport.

== Personal life ==
Herne is the son of fellow racing driver Stuart Herne, who won six National V8 Dirt Modified Speedway titles before retiring in 2008 after suffering spinal injuries in a crash at the Donald 500.

== Career ==
Herne made his single-seater debut in 2017, competing in the Australian Formula Ford Series. In his first season in the series, Herne took a lone podium at Phillip Island en route to a sixth-place points finish. Returning to the series for 2018, Herne moved up to fourth overall with his only series win at Sydney and eight other podiums to his name. During 2018, Herne also clinched the Victorian and New South Wales Formula Ford titles.

Switching to the TA2 Racing Muscle Car Series for 2019, Herne took his maiden win at Morgan Park, before scoring six other wins to end the year fifth in points. The following year, Herne primarily raced in Aussie Tin Tops-sanctioned races, winning all three of his appearances in the TA2 class, as well as an evaluation test for Garry Rogers Motorsport in S5000 machinery. Towards the end of the year, Herne was set to make his debut in the Supercars Championship for the same team at the Bathurst 1000, but those plans fell through when he was denied a Motorsport Australia Superlicence.

In 2021, Herne moved up to the Australian National Trans-Am Series with Dream Racing Australia, as well as competing in the S5000 Australian Drivers' Championship and the S5000 Tasman Series for Garry Rogers Motorsport. In his first season in Trans-Am, Herne took four wins in the first five rounds, before winning all three races at the Bathurst finale to seal his maiden series title. On his return to single-seaters in S5000 meanwhile, Herne took a pair of second-place finishes at Sandown in the former to end the season sixth overall, a result he matched at Bathurst in the Tasman Series en route to a seventh-place points finish.

Continuing full-time in Trans-Am for 2022, Herne dominated the season, scoring 13 wins in the 20 races he started to secure his second consecutive series title. During 2022, Herne competed in the last three rounds of the S5000 Australian Drivers' Championship for GRM, scoring a best result of second at both Melbourne and Hidden Valley as he ended the season seventh in points, as well as making his Trans-Am Series debut at Circuit of the Americas. Towards the end of the year, Herne returned to the S5000 Tasman Series, winning four races in a row to secure his only series title. Moving to the American Trans-Am series full-time for 2023, Herne scored three TA2 podiums to end the year 11th in points. Towards the end of the year, Herne made a one-off return to the S5000 Australian Drivers' Championship for GRM.

Returning to its Australian counterpart for 2024 with his own racing team, Herne scored a lone win at Queensland and five other podiums en route to a fifth-place points finish. During 2024, Herne also made his debut in Lamborghini Super Trofeo Europe for Leipert Motorsport. Continuing in the series for 2025, Herne won twice at Mallala and scored nine other podiums to secure runner-up honours. During 2025, Herne also returned to the TA2 Racing Muscle Car Series, in which he clinched the TA2 Kings of the West title. The following year, Herne remained in the series with his own team, taking nine wins en route to his third series title at the Sandown finale. During 2026, Herne also returned to Garry Rogers Motorsport to make his long-awaited Bathurst 1000 debut alongside James Moffat.

== Racing record ==
=== Racing career summary ===
Season	Series	Team	Races	Wins	Poles	F/Laps	Podiums	Points	Position
2017	Australian Formula Ford Series	Shell	17	0	0	0	1	132.5	6th
2017	Victorian Formula Ford Championship – Fiesta		6	0	0	0	1	111	14th
2017	New South Wales Formula Ford Championship – Fiesta		5	0	0	0	0		
2018	Australian Formula Ford Series	BF Racing	21	1	0	3	9	236	4th
2018	Victorian Formula Ford Championship – Fiesta		15	7	1	5	13	446	1st
2018	New South Wales Formula Ford Championship – Fiesta		15	5	2	5	12	405	1st
2018	South Australian Formula Ford Championship		4	1	0	2	3	115	7th
2019	TA2 Muscle Car Series		24	7	0	0	15	1066	5th
2020	TA2 Muscle Car Series		4	4	1	4	4	220	12th
2020	Wake Up! Hostels Combined Sedans – TA2		3	2	1	3	3	145	1st
2020	Townsville Tin Tops – Super Tranz		3	2	1	3	3	140	1st
2020	Bathurst Tin Tops – TA2		3	3	1	3	3	150	1st
2020	National Trans-Am Series		3	0	0	1	2	110	17th
2021	Tasmanian Ten Thousand		4	0	0	0	3	241	4th
2021	S5000 Australian Drivers' Championship	Garry Rogers Motorsport	12	0	0	0	6	304	6th
2021	S5000 Tasman Series	Garry Rogers Motorsport	7	0	0	2	2	85	7th
2021	Australian National Trans-Am Series	Dream Racing Australia	18	8	0	0	17	880	1st
2021	TA2 Muscle Car Northern Series		4	4	1	1	4	220	10th
2022	Australian National Trans-Am Series		20	13	3	4	18	1048	1st
2022	S5000 Australian Drivers' Championship	Valvoline Garry Rogers Motorsport	9	0	1	1	2	195	7th
2022	S5000 Tasman Series	Valvoline Garry Rogers Motorsport	6	4	1	0	4	187	1st
2022	Trans-Am – TA2		1	0	0	0	0	23	34th
2023	Trans-Am – TA2		13	0	0	0	3	664	11th
2023	S5000 Australian Drivers' Championship	Garry Rogers Motorsport	3	0	0	0	0	50	15th
2023	S5000 Tasman Series	Garry Rogers Motorsport	3	0	0	0	0	50	5th
2024	Australian National Trans-Am Series	Nathan Herne Racing	19	1	2	0	6	494	5th
2024	Lamborghini Super Trofeo Europe – Pro	Leipert Motorsport	2	0	0	0	0	10	18th
2024	Trans-Am – TA2		3	0	0	0	0	200	20th
2025	Australian National Trans-Am Series	Nathan Herne Racing	21	2	0	2	11	509	2nd
2025	TA2 Racing Muscle Car Series	Nathan Herne Racing	6	1	0	1	4	0	NC†
2025	TA2 Kings of the West	Nathan Herne Racing	4	2	0	1	4	226	1st
2025	Trans-Am National Series – TA2		2	0	0	0	0	123	28th
2026	Australian National Trans-Am Series	Nathan Herne Racing	21	9	1	5	12	413	1st
2026	Supercars Championship	Garry Rogers Motorsport						*	*
2026	Trans-Am Series – TA2		2	0	0	0	1	135	28th

* Season still in progress.

^{†} As Herne was a guest driver, he was ineligible for points.

=== Complete S5000 results ===
Year	Series	Team	1	2	3	4	5	6	7	8	9	10	11	12	13	14	15	16	17	18	Position	Points
2021	Australian	Garry Rogers Motorsport	SYM; R1; Ret	SYM; R2; 3	SYM; R3; 3	PHI; R4; 3	PHI; R5; 4	PHI; R6; Ret	SAN; R7; 2	SAN; R8; 4	SAN; R9; 2	SMP; R10; 4	SMP; R11; 6	SMP; R12; 3							6th	304
2021	Tasman	Garry Rogers Motorsport	SMP; R1; Ret	SMP; R2; 5	SMP; R3; Ret	BAT; R4; 2	BAT; R5; 4	BAT; R6; 2	BAT; R7; C												7th	85
2022	Australian	Garry Rogers Motorsport	SYM; R1	SYM; R2	SYM; R3	PHI; R4	PHI; R5	PHI; R6	MEL; R7; 4	MEL; R8; 5	MEL; R9; 2	SMP; R10; 4	SMP; R11; 7	SMP; R12; 7	HID; R13; 2	HID; R14; 9	HID; R15; Ret				7th	195
2022	Tasman	Garry Rogers Motorsport	SUR; R1; 1	SUR; R2; 1	SUR; R3; 1	ADE; R4; 1	ADE; R5; 11	ADE; R6; 13													1st	187
2023	Australian	Garry Rogers Motorsport	SYM; R1	SYM; R2	SYM; R3	PHI; R4	PHI; R5	PHI; R6	WIN; R7	WIN; R8	WIN; R9	SMP; R10	SMP; R11	SMP; R12	BEN; R13	BEN; R14	BEN; R15	ADL; R16; Ret	ADL; R17; 6	ADL; R18; 4	15th	50

=== Supercars Championship results ===
Supercars results
Year	Team	Car	1	2	3	4	5	6	7	8	9	10	11	12	13	14	15	16	17	18	19	20	21	22	23	24	25	26	27	28	29	30	31	32	33	34	35	36	37	Position	Points
2026	Garry Rogers Motorsport	Chevrolet Camaro ZL1	SMP; R1	SMP; R2	SMP; R3	MEL; R4	MEL; R5	MEL; R6	MEL; R7	TAU; R8	TAU; R9	CHR; R10	CHR; R11	CHR; R12	CHR; R13	SYM; R14	SYM; R15	SYM; R16	HID; R20	HID; R21	HID; R22	TOW; R23	TOW; R24	TOW; R25	BAR; R17	BAR; R18	BAR; R19	QLD; R26	QLD; R27	QLD; R28	BEN; R28	BAT; R30; 19	SUR; R31	SUR; R32	SAN; R33	SAN; R34	ADE; R35	ADE; R36	ADE; R37	54th	67

=== Bathurst 1000 results ===
Year	Team	Car	Co-driver	Position	Laps
2026	Garry Rogers Motorsport	Chevrolet Camaro ZL1	(Australia) James Moffat	19th	159
