= 2021 S5000 Australian Drivers' Championship =

Motor racing competition

The 2021 S5000 Australian Drivers' Championship, known by its sponsored identity the VHT S5000 Australian Drivers' Championship, was the inaugural season of the Australian S5000 Championship, run after a series of exhibition races in 2019. The series was sanctioned by Motorsport Australia (MA) and promoted by the Australian Racing Group as part of the 2020 and 2021 Shannons Nationals Motor Racing Series. The season was held over 4 rounds, it began in January at Symmons Plains Raceway and ended in May at Sydney Motorsport Park. Joey Mawson won the Australian Drivers' Championship (MA Gold Star) title.

== Teams and drivers ==
The following teams and drivers were under contract to compete in the 2021 championship:

Team	No.	Drivers	Rounds	Ref.
Team BRM	15	(New Zealand) Kaleb Ngatoa	2–4	
Team BRM	16	(Australia) Tommy Smith	1	
Team BRM	27	(Australia) Joey Mawson	All	
Team BRM	49	(Australia) Thomas Randle	All (Note: Competed in the abandoned March 2020 event at Melbourne.)	
Tim Macrow Racing	23	(Australia) Tim Macrow	All	
Garry Rogers Motorsport	29	(Australia) Nathan Herne	All	
Garry Rogers Motorsport	31	(Australia) James Golding	All	
Garry Rogers Motorsport	96	(Australia) Luis Leeds	All	
Astuti Motorsport	39	(Australia) Antonio Astuti	1–3 (Note: Competed in the abandoned March 2020 event at Melbourne with Tim Macrow Racing.)	
Australian Racing Enterprise	88	(Australia) Cooper Webster	All	
Willmington Motorsport	89	(Australia) Braydan Willmington	All	
Modena Engineering	92	(Australia) Ricky Capo	All	

The following drivers only competed in practice and/or qualifying for the abandoned March 2020 round at Melbourne:

Team	No.	Drivers	Ref.
Team BRM	16	(United Kingdom) Jack Aitken	
Team BRM	33	(Australia) James Davison	
Team BRM	93	(Australia) Zane Goddard	
Team BRM	111	(Brazil) Rubens Barrichello	
Milldun Motorsport	27	(Australia) Barton Mawer	
Garry Rogers Motorsport	34	(France) Alexandre Prémat	
Borland Racing Developments	38	(Italy) Giancarlo Fisichella	
88Racing	88	(New Zealand) Jordan Michels	

== Race calendar ==
The original 2020 calendar proposal was released on 29 October 2019, with six confirmed rounds, plus one non-championship round at the "Bathurst International", all held in Australia. Qualifying was held during the opening round at Melbourne, but the event was abandoned on March 13, 2020, as the headlining Australian Grand Prix had been cancelled by Formula 1 because of McLaren's withdrawal after a team member was tested positive for COVID-19.

With multiple disruptions delaying the season start due to the COVID-19 pandemic, heavy border restrictions in Australia further complicating the holding of the championship, and various calendar revisions that did not went ahead as scheduled, the season started in January 2021, with a four-round calendar where one venue was still to be announced. It included a round at Symmons Plains, which was not featured in the calendar until the May 2020 revision. Rounds at Winton and The Bend were not rescheduled, while the rounds at Melbourne and Bathurst were set apart from the calendar due to their later dates as support events for the Australian Grand Prix and the inaugural Bathurst International, being later featured as part of the end-of-year S5000 Tasman Series. The round at Phillip Island was later postponed and rescheduled. On 16 February 2021 it was announced the third round would be held at Sandown. As had been planned for 2020, the winner of each feature race received a trophy named in honour of former Australian racing drivers.

Round	Circuit	Feature Race	Location	Date
1	(Tasmania) Symmons Plains Raceway	John McCormack Cup	Launceston, Tasmania	25–26 January (Note: Not included in the original 2020 calendar; scheduled as part of the May 2020 calendar revision)
2	(Victoria (state)) Phillip Island Grand Prix Circuit	Costanzo Cup	Phillip Island, Victoria	13–14 March (Note: Originally due to take place on 23 August 2020; then scheduled for October 2020 and later postponed without a date before being rescheduled.)
3	(Victoria (state)) Sandown Raceway	John Bowe Trophy	Springvale, Victoria	21 March (Note: Originally due to take place on 13 September 2020, it was initially cancelled before being rescheduled.)
4	(New South Wales) Sydney Motorsport Park	Warwick Brown Cup	Eastern Creek, New South Wales	1–2 May (Note: Originally due to take place on 29 March 2020, it was subsequently rescheduled for 16 August 2020 and 6 September 2020, and then cancelled before being rescheduled.)

The following racetracks were included at some point on the 2020 calendar, but were not rescheduled for the 2021 Australian Drivers' Championship.

Circuit	Location	Scheduled dates
(Victoria (state)) Albert Park Circuit	Melbourne, Victoria	12–15 March 2020 (Note: Qualifying was held on 12 March 2020; the event was abandoned on 13 March 2020.)
(Victoria (state)) Winton Motor Raceway	Benalla, Victoria	1–3 May 2020
(South Australia) The Bend Motorsport Park	Tailem Bend, South Australia	12–14 June 2020
(New South Wales) Mount Panorama Circuit	Bathurst, New South Wales	13–15 November 2020 (Note: Originally scheduled as a non-championship round, it became a points event in the May 2020 revision.)

== S5000 Tasman Series ==
See: 2021 S5000 Tasman Series

The follow-up season, initially billed as the 2021–2022 S5000 Australian Drivers Championship, was planned to feature the inaugural holding of the S5000 International Triple Crown, a stand-alone series-within-the-series consisting of the three events held in Melbourne, Bathurst and Gold Coast, supporting the Australian Grand Prix, the Bathurst International and the Gold Coast 500 respectively. After the cancellation of the 2021 Australian Grand Prix, it was decided to instead revive the Tasman Series with the remaining 2021 rounds, separate from the S5000 Australian Drivers Championship that will be held in 2022.

== Race results ==
Round		Circuit	Date	Pole position	Fastest lap	Winning driver	Winning entrant
1	H1	(Tasmania) Symmons Plains Raceway	25 January	(Australia) Thomas Randle	(Australia) Thomas Randle	(Australia) Joey Mawson	Team BRM
1	H2	(Tasmania) Symmons Plains Raceway	26 January		(Australia) Joey Mawson	(Australia) Tim Macrow	Macrow Racing
1	ME	(Tasmania) Symmons Plains Raceway	26 January		(Australia) Thomas Randle	(Australia) Thomas Randle	Team BRM
2	H1	(Victoria (state)) Phillip Island Grand Prix Circuit	13 March	(Australia) James Golding	(Australia) Joey Mawson	(Australia) Tim Macrow	Macrow Racing
2	H2	(Victoria (state)) Phillip Island Grand Prix Circuit	13 March		(Australia) Thomas Randle	(Australia) Cooper Webster	Australian Racing Enterprise
2	ME	(Victoria (state)) Phillip Island Grand Prix Circuit	14 March		(Australia) Joey Mawson	(Australia) Joey Mawson	Team BRM
3	H1	(Victoria (state)) Sandown Raceway	20 March	(Australia) Joey Mawson	(Australia) Joey Mawson	(Australia) James Golding	Garry Rogers Motorsport
3	H2	(Victoria (state)) Sandown Raceway	21 March		(New Zealand) Kaleb Ngatoa	(New Zealand) Kaleb Ngatoa	Team BRM
3	ME	(Victoria (state)) Sandown Raceway	21 March		(Australia) Joey Mawson	(Australia) Joey Mawson	Team BRM
4	H1	(New South Wales) Sydney Motorsport Park	1 May	(Australia) Joey Mawson	(Australia) James Golding	(Australia) James Golding	Garry Rogers Motorsport
4	H2	(New South Wales) Sydney Motorsport Park	1 May		(Australia) Cooper Webster	(New Zealand) Kaleb Ngatoa	Team BRM
4	ME	(New South Wales) Sydney Motorsport Park	2 May		(Australia) James Golding	(Australia) James Golding	Garry Rogers Motorsport

== Drivers' standings ==
At each meeting, a qualifying session, two qualifying heats and a Main Event were held. Meeting points were awarded to the fastest ten qualifiers in qualifying, where the grid for the first heat was set. For the second heat, the top 75% from qualifying were reversed. The grid for the Main Event was defined by the points earned by the drivers across the weekend.

Position	1st	2nd	3rd	4th	5th	6th	7th	8th	9th	10th	11th	12th	13th	14th	15th	Ret
Qualifying	10	9	8	7	6	5	4	3	2	1	0					0
Qualifying Heats	30	27	24	22	20	18	16	14	12	10	8	6	4	2	1	0
Main event	60	50	40	32	26	24	22	20	18	16	14	12	10	8	6	0

Pos.	Driver	SYM				PHI				SAN				SYD				Points
Pos.	Driver	Q	H1	H2	ME	Q	H1	H2	ME	Q	H1	H2	ME	Q	H1	H2	ME	Points
1	(Australia) Joey Mawson	2	1	4	4	10	5	3	1	1	5	2	1	1	2	5	8	392
2	(Australia) Thomas Randle	1	2	6	1	3	2	2	4	3	DNS	3	6	6	5	3	4	346
3	(Australia) Tim Macrow	7	5	1	2	2	1	5	3	5	4	7	5	5	6	2	5	339
4	(Australia) James Golding	3	3	5	Ret	1	4	6	2	2	1	Ret	4	2	1	4	1	329
5	(Australia) Luis Leeds	6	6	2	7	5	6	7	5	6	6	6	3	4	3	7	2	307
6	(Australia) Nathan Herne	4	Ret	3	3	4	3	4	Ret	4	2	4	2	3	4	6	3	304
7	(Australia) Cooper Webster	8	8	7	6	7	8	1	6	7	Ret	8	7	9	8	8	6	209
8	(Australia) Ricky Capo	5	4	8	5	6	7	DNS	7	9	7	5	9	7	Ret	10	Ret	173
9	(New Zealand) Kaleb Ngatoa					8	10	Ret	8	8	3	1	DNS	8	7	1	7	149
10	(Australia) Braydan Willmington	11	10	10	9	9	DNS	8	10	11	8	10	10	10	9	9	9	148
11	(Australia) Antonio Astuti	10	9	9	8	11	9	9	9	10	9	9	8					128
12	(Australia) Tommy Smith	9	7	Ret	DNS													18
Pos.	Driver	SYM				PHI				SAN				SYD				Points

== See also ==
- 2021 S5000 Tasman Series
