= 2022 S5000 Australian Drivers' Championship =

Motor racing competition

The 2022 S5000 Australian Drivers' Championship, known by its sponsored identity the Nulon S5000 Australian Drivers' Championship, was the second season of the S5000 Australian Drivers' Championship. Joey Mawson, last years reigning champion, won the title again, marking only the ninth time in 60 years of Gold Star competition where the championship was successfully defended.

== Teams and drivers ==
The following teams and drivers were competing in the 2022 championship:

Team	No.	Driver	Rounds	Ref
Team BRM	1	(Australia) Joey Mawson	All	
Team BRM	3	(Australia) Tim Slade	1	
Team BRM	3	(Australia) Zane Goddard	2–3	
Team BRM	3	(Australia) Tim Berryman	5	
Team BRM	4	(Australia) James Davison	3	
Team BRM	15	(New Zealand) Kaleb Ngatoa	1–3, 5	
Versa Motorsport	5	(Australia) Thomas Maxwell	5	
Versa Motorsport	8	(Australia) Shae Davies	2–4	
Versa Motorsport	24	(Australia) John Martin	5	
Versa Motorsport	37	(Australia) Cooper Webster	All	
Versa Motorsport	49	(Australia) Jordan Boys	5	
Valvoline Garry Rogers Motorsport	12	(Australia) Adam Garwood	1–3	
Valvoline Garry Rogers Motorsport	17	(Australia) Ben Bargwanna	3	
Valvoline Garry Rogers Motorsport	18	(Australia) Aaron Cameron	3–5	
Valvoline Garry Rogers Motorsport	29	(Australia) Nathan Herne	3–5	
Valvoline Garry Rogers Motorsport	31	(Australia) James Golding	All	
Amadio Motorsport / GRM	22	(Australia) Sebastien Amadio	3, 5	
Tim Macrow Racing	23	(Australia) Tim Macrow	All	
88 Racing	48	(Australia) Blake Purdie	All	
88 Racing	88	(Australia) Josh Fife	1	
Somers Motorsport	71	(Australia) Conor Somers	3	
Matt Chahda Motorsport	81	(Australia) Matt Chahda	3	

== Race calendar ==
The second S5000 season was originally supposed to start in late 2021, but after multiple postponements and cancellations, the organizers instead decided to hold a revived Tasman Series over the end of 2021, and start the second S5000 season in January 2022. In November 2021, it was announced that the S5000 series would take part in the 2022 Darwin Triple Crown. On December 15, the full calendar was released for the Australian and Tasman Championships. On 17 January 2022, Sydney was confirmed to hold the fourth round of the championship. On June 2, 2022, the sixth round at Sandown Raceway, scheduled for September, was cancelled to avoid a three-month break between the last two rounds.

Round	Circuit	Feature Race	Location	Date
1	(Tasmania) Symmons Plains Raceway	John McCormack Cup	Launceston, Tasmania	11–13 February
2	(Victoria (state)) Phillip Island Grand Prix Circuit	Alfredo Costanzo Cup	Phillip Island, Victoria	18–20 March
3	(Victoria (state)) Albert Park Grand Prix Circuit	Melbourne Grand Prix Alan Jones Trophy	Melbourne, Victoria	7–10 April
4	(New South Wales) Sydney Motorsports Park	Warwick Brown Cup	Eastern Creek, New South Wales	27-29 May
5	(Northern Territory) Hidden Valley Raceway	Darwin Triple Crown	Darwin, Northern Territory	17–19 June

== Race results ==
Round		Circuit	Date	Pole position	Fastest lap	Winning driver	Winning entrant
1	R1	(Tasmania) Symmons Plains Raceway	12 February	(Australia) James Golding	(Australia) Joey Mawson	(Australia) Joey Mawson	Team BRM
1	R2	(Tasmania) Symmons Plains Raceway	13 February		(Australia) Tim Macrow	(Australia) Josh Fife	88 Racing
1	ME	(Tasmania) Symmons Plains Raceway	13 February		(Australia) James Golding	(Australia) Tim Macrow	Tim Macrow Racing
2	R1	(Victoria (state)) Phillip Island Grand Prix Circuit	19 March	(Australia) James Golding	(Australia) James Golding	(Australia) James Golding	Valvoline Garry Rogers Motorsport
2	R2	(Victoria (state)) Phillip Island Grand Prix Circuit	19 March		(Australia) Joey Mawson	(Australia) Tim Macrow	Tim Macrow Racing
2	ME	(Victoria (state)) Phillip Island Grand Prix Circuit	20 March		(Australia) Joey Mawson	(Australia) Joey Mawson	Team BRM
3	R1	(Victoria (state)) Albert Park Grand Prix Circuit	8 April	(Australia) Joey Mawson	(Australia) Aaron Cameron	(Australia) Joey Mawson	Team BRM
3	R2	(Victoria (state)) Albert Park Grand Prix Circuit	9 April		(Australia) Cooper Webster	(Australia) Shae Davies	Versa Motorsport
3	ME	(Victoria (state)) Albert Park Grand Prix Circuit	10 April		(Australia) Joey Mawson	(Australia) Joey Mawson	Team BRM
4	R1	(New South Wales) Sydney Motorsports Park	28 May	(Australia) Joey Mawson	(Australia) Joey Mawson	(Australia) Joey Mawson	Team BRM
4	R2	(New South Wales) Sydney Motorsports Park	29 May		(Australia) Joey Mawson	(Australia) Cooper Webster	Versa Motorsport
4	ME	(New South Wales) Sydney Motorsports Park	29 May		(Australia) Nathan Herne	(Australia) Aaron Cameron	Valvoline Garry Rogers Motorsport
5	R1	(Northern Territory) Hidden Valley Raceway	18 June	(Australia) Nathan Herne	(Australia) Cooper Webster	(Australia) Cooper Webster	Versa Motorsport
5	R2	(Northern Territory) Hidden Valley Raceway	19 June		(Australia) Jordan Boys	(New Zealand) Kaleb Ngatoa	Team BRM
5	ME	(Northern Territory) Hidden Valley Raceway	19 June		(Australia) Aaron Cameron	(Australia) Aaron Cameron	Valvoline Garry Rogers Motorsport

== Season report ==
The 2022 S5000 Australian Drivers' Championship began in February at Symmons Plains, with defending champion Joey Mawson overtaking pole-sitter James Golding at the start of the first race and then leading him to the flag. Josh Fife won the second race, his second-ever S5000 race in the only round he competed in, leading home Tim Macrow, while Mawson retired. This meant his car had to be repaired for the main event, which was done with only seconds to spare. Macrow then won the main event as his closest competitor Golding ran off the circuit in the first part of the race. Mawson's tumultuous weekend meant Macrow led the championship by 13 points after the first round, ahead of Cooper Webster.

As the championship headed to Phillip Island, Golding once again took pole position, this time he was able to hold off Mawson in the first race and became the fourth different winner in as many races. Blake Purdie started first in race two, but was overtaken by Zane Goddard and Macrow, with the former running off the road, handing the latter the lead and the race win. The main event was a close battle between Golding and Mawson, with the latter surviving a late safety car restart to come out on top. Macrow only managed fourth place in race three, which meant his championship lead came down to just a single point over Mawson, with Golding and Webster tied in third.

The round in support of the Formula 1 Australian Grand Prix at Albert Park saw a surge in entry numbers, almost doubling to 16 drivers. It was still Mawson on top though, first achieving pole position in qualifying and then winning the first race - albeit only just, as new entry and reigning Tasman Series champion Aaron Cameron almost capitalized on a last-lap mistake by the leader. Shae Davies then won a shortened race two that ended under the safety car due to an incident involving James Davison and Goddard. Mawson was back on top for the main event, comfortably leading home Nathan Herne and Macrow and taking the championship lead in the process.

Sydney was the host of the penultimate round of the championship, with only eight cars entered. Mawson continued where he left off in Melbourne, getting pole position again even though he spun in qualifying. He then beat Cameron to win a thrilling first night race in S5000 history as his closest championship rival Golding retired with a broken steering arm. Webster led from lights to flag in race two, achieving his second win in the category. Cameron then finally claimed his first Gold Star win in the main event, charging to the front after a collision with Mawson on lap one. Mawson left Sydney with a 55-point cushion to second-placed man Macrow, who was a further 30 points ahead of Golding.

As the sixth round of the championship was cancelled, the S5000 debut at Hidden Valley Raceway turned into a championship decider. Herne claimed his first pole position in a qualifying interrupted by a heavy crash by Tim Berryman. His triumph didn't even last a single corner though, as Webster took the lead in race one and then won without being challenged again. Kaleb Ngatoa took his third victory in the category in race two, while a conservative sixth place for Mawson was enough to secure his championship defense. Cameron then won his second consecutive main event from pole, as Macrow lost third in the championship due to a non-finish.

Golding, Webster and Macrow had no answer to Mawson's pace over the season, and in the end his advantage was over 70 points to Golding in second. Behind him, it was very competitive though, with only nine points between second and fourth. The upswing in regular entries that was hoped for after 2021 sadly didn't happen, as only five drivers competed for the full season, but the strong field for the Formula 1-supporting third round still showed that interest in the championship was steadily growing.

== Drivers' standings ==
At each meeting, a qualifying session and three races were held. Meeting points were awarded to the fastest ten qualifiers in qualifying, where the grid for Race 1 was set. For Race 2, the top 75% from qualifying were reversed. The grid for the Main Event was defined by the points earned by the drivers across the weekend.

Position	1st	2nd	3rd	4th	5th	6th	7th	8th	9th	10th	11th	12th	13th	14th	15th	Ret
Qualifying	10	9	8	7	6	5	4	3	2	1	0					0
Race 1	30	27	24	22	20	18	16	14	12	10	8	6	4	2	1	0
Race 2	20	18	16	14	12	10	9	8	7	6	5	4	3	2	1	0
Main event	60	50	40	32	26	24	22	20	18	16	14	12	10	8	6	0

Pos.	Driver	SYM (Tasmania)				PHI (Victoria (state))				MEL (Victoria (state))				SYD (New South Wales)				HID (Northern Territory)				Points
Pos.	Driver	Q	R1	R2	ME	Q	R1	R2	ME	Q	R1	R2	ME	Q	R1	R2	ME	Q	R1	R2	ME	Points
1	(Australia) Joey Mawson	2	1	Ret	4	2	2	3	1	1	1	9	1	1	1	6	2	5	4	6	Ret	428
2	(Australia) James Golding	1	2	3	5	1	1	5	2	3	8	6	5	3	Ret	2	3	7	7	2	4	375
3	(Australia) Cooper Webster	4	4	5	2	3	3	2	3	8	6	3	7	6	6	1	Ret	2	1	Ret	2	372
4	(Australia) Tim Macrow	5	5	2	1	5	4	1	4	6	5	4	3	5	3	3	5	6	10	3	Ret	366
5	(Australia) Aaron Cameron									2	2	7	4	2	2	Ret	1	4	3	4	1	278
6	(Australia) Blake Purdie	6	6	Ret	6	7	5	Ret	Ret	10	14	2	6	7	7	4	4	10	6	7	6	234
7	(Australia) Nathan Herne									4	4	5	2	4	4	7	7	1	2	9	Ret	195
8	(New Zealand) Kaleb Ngatoa	8	9	4	7	4	8	8	6	9	7	14	10					8	8	1	Ret	177
9	(Australia) Shae Davies					8	6	6	Ret	11	15	1	14	8	5	5	6					119
10	(Australia) Zane Goddard					6	9	4	5	5	3	Ret	8									107
11	(Australia) Adam Garwood	9	8	Ret	Ret	9	7	7	7	14	10	10	13									91
12	(Australia) Josh Fife	7	7	1	3																	80
13	(Australia) John Martin																	3	5	5	5	64
14	(Australia) Jordan Boys																	9	9	8	3	62
15	(Australia) Ben Bargwanna									7	9	8	9									42
16	(Australia) Tim Slade	3	3	6	Ret																	42
17	(Australia) Sebastien Amadio									16	12	11	Ret					11	11	Ret	8	39
18	(Australia) Tim Berryman																	12	DNS	10	7	28
19	(Australia) Conor Somers									12	11	12	12									24
20	(Australia) James Davison									15	Ret	Ret	11									14
21	(Australia) Matt Chahda									13	13	13	Ret									7
—	(Australia) Thomas Maxwell																	WD	WD	WD	WD	—
Pos.	Driver	Q	R1	R2	ME	Q	R1	R2	ME	Q	R1	R2	ME	Q	R1	R2	ME	Q	R1	R2	ME	Points
Pos.	Driver	SYM (Tasmania)				PHI (Victoria (state))				MEL (Victoria (state))				SYD (New South Wales)				HID (Northern Territory)				Points

== See also ==
- 2022 S5000 Tasman Series
