= 2020 Bathurst 1000 =

Motor race in Australia

(New South Wales) 2020 Supercheap Auto Bathurst 1000
Event Information
- Round 8 of 8 in the 2020 Supercars Championship
- Layout of the Mount Panorama Circuit
- Date: 15–18 October 2020
- Location: Bathurst, New South Wales
- Venue: Mount Panorama Circuit
- Weather: Thursday: Fine, 24°C

Results
Race 1
Distance	161 laps	1000 km
Pole position	(Australia) Cam Waters; Tickford Racing	2:03.5592
Winner	(New Zealand) Shane van Gisbergen (Australia) Garth Tander; Triple Eight Race Engineering	6:10:56.1143

The 2020 Bathurst 1000 (formally known as the 2020 Supercheap Auto Bathurst 1000) was a motor racing event for Supercars that was held on the weekend of 15–18 October 2020. It was held at the Mount Panorama Circuit in Bathurst, New South Wales, Australia, and featured a single 1000 kilometre race. The event was the final race of the 2020 Supercars Championship and the final time Supercheap Auto was the naming rights sponsor, having been so since 2005, as Cumberland, Georgia (United States)–based Genuine Parts Company has acquired naming rights for both the Supercars Championship and the Bathurst 1000 starting in 2021. This was the first Bathurst 1000 in history to run with a limited crowd capacity, due to the COVID-19 pandemic.

After a qualifying session held on the Friday, the top 10 drivers from that session competed in the shootout where Cam Waters from Tickford Racing claim the pole position with a time of 2:03.5592. In the race, driver pairing, Shane Van Gisbergen and Garth Tander from Triple Eight Race Engineering who started in fourth place won the race with Van Gisbergen winning his first Bathurst 1000 and Tander his fourth. Cam Waters and Will Davison from Tickford Racing finished in second, with Walkinshaw Andretti United's Chaz Mostert and Warren Luff completing the podium in third.

Following this, Scott McLaughlin who finished fifth in the race would win his third Supercars drivers' championship finishing 451 points ahead of Waters with Van Gisbergen finishing in third. In the teams' championship, DJR Team Penske claimed the title, finishing 262 points ahead of Triple Eight, with Tickford Racing rounding out the top three.

== Report ==
=== Background and impact of the COVID-19 pandemic ===
The event was the 63rd running of the Bathurst 1000, which was first held at the Phillip Island Grand Prix Circuit in 1960 as a 500-mile race for Australian-made standard production sedans, and marks the 60th time that the race was held at Mount Panorama. It was the 24th running of the Australian 1000 race, which was first held after the organisational split between the Australian Racing Drivers Club and V8 Supercars Australia that saw two "Bathurst 1000" races contested in both 1997 and 1998.

This was the first time since 2000 that the race was also the final round of the championship.

The 2019 winners of the race were Scott McLaughlin and Alexandre Prémat, though Premat, a Clark County, Nevada (United States) resident who is the lead instructor at driving school for premium sportscars there, was unable to compete in the race due to border restrictions imposed as a result of the COVID-19 pandemic in Australia.

=== Entry list ===
Twenty-five cars were entered in the event – 17 Holden Commodores and eight Ford Mustangs, the smallest entry list in the events' history and the first Ford and Holden-only race since 2012. In addition to the 24 regular entries, there was a single 'Wildcard' entry from the Garry Rogers Motorsport team for débutants Tyler Everingham and Jayden Ojeda from the Super2 Series. GRM had originally planned for Nathan Herne from the Australian TA2 Racing Series to race in place of Ojeda, however Herne's entry was blocked as Motorsport Australia denied him the required licence. Seven drivers made their debuts in the race – Everingham and Ojeda, championship driver Zane Goddard, Australian and World TCR driver Dylan O'Keeffe, former Super2 driver Kurt Kostecki, and current Super2 drivers Jordan Boys and Broc Feeney. With 45 Australians and 5 New Zealanders in the line-up, it marked the first grid made up of solely Antipodean drivers since 1964.

No.	Drivers	Team (Sponsors)	Car	No.	Drivers	Team (Sponsors)	Car
2	(Australia) Bryce Fullwood (Australia) Kurt Kostecki	Walkinshaw Andretti United (Middy's Electrical)	Holden Commodore ZB	19	(Australia) Alex Davison (Australia) Jonathon Webb	Team Sydney (Local Legends Jerky Biltong)	Holden Commodore ZB
3	(Australia) Macauley Jones (Australia) Tim Blanchard	Tim Blanchard Racing (CoolDrive)	Holden Commodore ZB	20	(Australia) Scott Pye (Australia) Dean Fiore	Team 18 (DeWalt)	Holden Commodore ZB
4	(Australia) Jack Smith (Australia) Jack Perkins	Brad Jones Racing (SCT Logistics)	Holden Commodore ZB	22	(New Zealand) Chris Pither (Australia) Steve Owen	Team Sydney (Coca-Cola)	Holden Commodore ZB
5	(Australia) Lee Holdsworth (Australia) Michael Caruso	Tickford Racing (Truck Assist)	Ford Mustang GT	25	(Australia) Chaz Mostert (Australia) Warren Luff	Walkinshaw Andretti United (Appliances Online)	Holden Commodore ZB
6	(Australia) Cam Waters (Australia) Will Davison	Tickford Racing (Monster Energy)	Ford Mustang GT	34	(Australia) Zane Goddard (Australia) Jake Kostecki	Matt Stone Racing (Unit Workwear)	Holden Commodore ZB
7	(New Zealand) Andre Heimgartner (Australia) Dylan O'Keeffe	Kelly Racing (Ned Whisky)	Ford Mustang GT	35	(Australia) Garry Jacobson (Australia) David Russell	Matt Stone Racing (YellowCover)	Holden Commodore ZB
8	(Australia) Nick Percat (Australia) Thomas Randle	Brad Jones Racing (R+J Batteries)	Holden Commodore ZB	40	(Australia) Tyler Everingham (Australia) Jayden Ojeda	Garry Rogers Motorsport (Valvoline, LMCT+)	Holden Commodore ZB
9	(Australia) David Reynolds (Australia) Will Brown	Erebus Motorsport (Penrite)	Holden Commodore ZB	44	(Australia) James Courtney (Australia) Broc Feeney	Tickford Racing (Boost Mobile)	Ford Mustang GT
12	(New Zealand) Fabian Coulthard (Australia) Tony D'Alberto	DJR Team Penske (Shell V-Power)	Ford Mustang GT	55	(Australia) Jack Le Brocq (Australia) James Moffat	Tickford Racing (Supercheap Auto)	Ford Mustang GT
14	(Australia) Todd Hazelwood (Australia) Jordan Boys	Brad Jones Racing (Cub Cadet Lawnmowers)	Holden Commodore ZB	97	(New Zealand) Shane van Gisbergen (Australia) Garth Tander	Triple Eight Race Engineering (Red Bull, Holden)	Holden Commodore ZB
15	(Australia) Rick Kelly (Australia) Dale Wood	Kelly Racing (Castrol)	Ford Mustang GT	99	(Australia) Anton de Pasquale (Australia) Brodie Kostecki	Erebus Motorsport (Penrite)	Holden Commodore ZB
17	(New Zealand) Scott McLaughlin (Australia) Tim Slade	DJR Team Penske (Shell V-Power)	Ford Mustang GT	888	(Australia) Jamie Whincup (Australia) Craig Lowndes	Triple Eight Race Engineering (Red Bull, Holden)	Holden Commodore ZB
18	(Australia) Mark Winterbottom (Australia) James Golding	Team 18 (Irwin Tools)	Holden Commodore ZB				

Entries with a grey background are wildcard entries which do not compete in the full championship season.

== Results ==
=== Practice ===
Practice summary
Session	Day	Time	Fastest lap						
Session	Day	Time	No.	Driver	Team	Car	Time	Cond.	Ref.
Practice 1	Thursday	0930–1030	6	(Australia) Cam Waters	Tickford Racing	Ford Mustang GT	2:05.0233	Fine	
Practice 2	Thursday	1245–1345	55	(Australia) James Moffat	Tickford Racing	Ford Mustang GT	2:06.0584	Fine	
Practice 3	Thursday	1600–1700	6	(Australia) Cam Waters	Tickford Racing	Ford Mustang GT	2:04.1696	Fine	
Practice 4	Friday	0945–1055	6	(Australia) Will Davison	Tickford Racing	Ford Mustang GT	2:05.0667	Heavy cloud	
Practice 5	Friday	1210–1310	17	(New Zealand) Scott McLaughlin	DJR Team Penske	Ford Mustang GT	2:04.3716	Patchy cloud	
Practice 6	Saturday	0910-1010	25	(Australia) Warren Luff	Walkinshaw Andretti United	Holden Commodore ZB	2:05.4597	Fine	
Practice 7	Saturday	1135–1235	6	(Australia) Cam Waters	Tickford Racing	Ford Mustang GT	2:04.3493	Fine	
Warm-Up	Sunday	0840-0900	7	(New Zealand) Andre Heimgartner	Kelly Racing	Ford Mustang GT	2:05.3195	Fine	

=== Qualifying ===
Pos.	No.	Driver	Team	Car	Time	Gap	Grid (Note: Starting grid position)
1	5	(Australia) Lee Holdsworth	Tickford Racing	Ford Mustang GT	2:04.0242		Top 10 (Note: Grid position determined by Top 10 Shootout)
2	97	(New Zealand) Shane van Gisbergen	Triple Eight Race Engineering	Holden Commodore ZB	2:04.0351	+0.0108	Top 10
3	17	(New Zealand) Scott McLaughlin	DJR Team Penske	Ford Mustang GT	2:04.1035	+0.0792	Top 10
4	6	(Australia) Cam Waters	Tickford Racing	Ford Mustang GT	2:04.1056	+0.0813	Top 10
5	888	(Australia) Jamie Whincup	Triple Eight Race Engineering	Holden Commodore ZB	2:04.2660	+0.2417	Top 10
6	12	(New Zealand) Fabian Coulthard	DJR Team Penske	Ford Mustang GT	2:04.2813	+0.2571	Top 10
7	99	(Australia) Anton de Pasquale	Erebus Motorsport	Holden Commodore ZB	2:04.4668	+0.4425	Top 10
8	25	(Australia) Chaz Mostert	Walkinshaw Andretti United	Holden Commodore ZB	2:04.4936	+0.4693	Top 10
9	44	(Australia) James Courtney	Tickford Racing	Ford Mustang GT	2:04.5485	+0.5242	Top 10
10	8	(Australia) Nick Percat	Brad Jones Racing	Holden Commodore ZB	2:04.5539	+0.5296	Top 10
11	2	(Australia) Bryce Fullwood	Walkinshaw Andretti United	Holden Commodore ZB	2:04.6050	+0.5807	11
12	20	(Australia) Scott Pye	Team 18	Holden Commodore ZB	2:04.6320	+0.6077	12
13	9	(Australia) David Reynolds	Erebus Motorsport	Holden Commodore ZB	2:04.6730	+0.6487	13
14	7	(New Zealand) Andre Heimgartner	Kelly Racing	Ford Mustang GT	2:04.8529	+0.8287	14
15	55	(Australia) Jack Le Brocq	Tickford Racing	Ford Mustang GT	2:04.9054	+0.8811	15
16	14	(Australia) Todd Hazelwood	Brad Jones Racing	Holden Commodore ZB	2:04.9729	+0.9486	16
17	3	(Australia) Macauley Jones	Tim Blanchard Racing	Holden Commodore ZB	2:05.0374	+1.0131	17
18	18	(Australia) Mark Winterbottom	Team 18	Holden Commodore ZB	2:05.1731	+1.1489	18
19	15	(Australia) Rick Kelly	Kelly Racing	Ford Mustang GT	2:05.2592	+1.2349	19
20	19	(Australia) Alex Davison	Team Sydney	Holden Commodore ZB	2:05.3322	+1.3079	20
21	35	(Australia) Garry Jacobson	Matt Stone Racing	Holden Commodore ZB	2:05.4141	+1.3899	21
22	4	(Australia) Jack Smith	Brad Jones Racing	Holden Commodore ZB	2:06.3498	+2.3255	22
23	22	(New Zealand) Chris Pither	Team Sydney	Holden Commodore ZB	2:06.3535	+2.3292	23
24	40	(Australia) Tyler Everingham	Garry Rogers Motorsport	Holden Commodore ZB	2:06.6812	+2.657	24
25	34	(Australia) Jake Kostecki	Matt Stone Racing	Holden Commodore ZB	2:15.1542	+11.1299	25

=== Top 10 Shootout ===
Pos.	No.	Driver	Team	Car	Time	Gap	Grid
1	6	(Australia) Cam Waters	Tickford Racing	Ford Mustang GT	2:03.5592		1
2	17	(New Zealand) Scott McLaughlin	DJR Team Penske	Ford Mustang GT	2:04.0020	+0.4429	2
3	25	(Australia) Chaz Mostert	Walkinshaw Andretti United	Holden Commodore ZB	2:04.0100	+0.4508	3
4	97	(New Zealand) Shane van Gisbergen	Triple Eight Race Engineering	Holden Commodore ZB	2:04.4511	+0.8919	4
5	5	(Australia) Lee Holdsworth	Tickford Racing	Ford Mustang GT	2:04.6765	+1.1173	5
6	99	(Australia) Anton de Pasquale	Erebus Motorsport	Holden Commodore ZB	2:04.7768	+1.2096	6
7	12	(New Zealand) Fabian Coulthard	DJR Team Penske	Ford Mustang GT	2:04.8533	+1.2942	7
8	44	(Australia) James Courtney	Tickford Racing	Ford Mustang GT	2:05.3549	+1.7957	8
9	888	(Australia) Jamie Whincup	Triple Eight Race Engineering	Holden Commodore ZB	2:06.3940	+2.8349	9
DSQ (Note: Nick Percat was fourth fastest in the shootout, but was disqualified for the car being two kilograms below the minimum weight. He was relegated to 10th starting position.)	8	(Australia) Nick Percat	Brad Jones Racing	Holden Commodore ZB	0:00.0000	n/a	10

=== Race ===
Pos.	No.	Drivers	Team	Car	Laps	Time/Retired	Grid	Points
1	97	(New Zealand) Shane van Gisbergen (Australia) Garth Tander	Triple Eight Race Engineering	Holden Commodore ZB	161	6:10:56.1143	4	300
2	6	(Australia) Cam Waters (Australia) Will Davison	Tickford Racing	Ford Mustang GT	161	+0.866	1	276
3	25	(Australia) Chaz Mostert (Australia) Warren Luff	Walkinshaw Andretti United	Holden Commodore ZB	161	+1.609	3	258
4	12	(New Zealand) Fabian Coulthard (Australia) Tony D'Alberto	DJR Team Penske	Ford Mustang GT	161	+2.162	7	240
5	17	(New Zealand) Scott McLaughlin (Australia) Tim Slade	DJR Team Penske	Ford Mustang GT	161	+2.711	2	222
6	20	(Australia) Scott Pye (Australia) Dean Fiore	Team 18	Holden Commodore ZB	161	+3.969	12	204
7	5	(Australia) Lee Holdsworth (Australia) Michael Caruso	Tickford Racing	Ford Mustang GT	161	+4.734	5	192
8	18	(Australia) Mark Winterbottom (Australia) James Golding	Team 18	Holden Commodore ZB	161	+6.138	18	180
9	99	(Australia) Anton De Pasquale (Australia) Brodie Kostecki	Erebus Motorsport	Holden Commodore ZB	161	+7.645	6	168
10	44	(Australia) James Courtney (Australia) Broc Feeney	Tickford Racing	Ford Mustang GT	161	+7.716	8	156
11	7	(New Zealand) Andre Heimgartner (Australia) Dylan O'Keeffe	Kelly Racing	Ford Mustang GT	161	+8.090	14	144
12	19	(Australia) Alex Davison (Australia) Jonathon Webb	Team Sydney	Holden Commodore ZB	161	+9.144	20	138
13	3	(Australia) Macauley Jones (Australia) Tim Blanchard	Tim Blanchard Racing	Holden Commodore ZB	161	+9.458	17	132
14	55	(Australia) Jack Le Brocq (Australia) James Moffat	Tickford Racing	Ford Mustang GT	161	+11.471	15	126
15	9	(Australia) David Reynolds (Australia) Will Brown	Erebus Motorsport	Holden Commodore ZB	160	+1 Lap	13	120
16	22	(New Zealand) Chris Pither (Australia) Steve Owen	Team Sydney	Holden Commodore ZB	159	+2 Laps	23	114
17	15	(Australia) Rick Kelly (Australia) Dale Wood	Kelly Racing	Ford Mustang GT	144	+17 Laps	19	108
18	8	(Australia) Nick Percat (Australia) Thomas Randle	Brad Jones Racing	Holden Commodore ZB	133	+28 Laps	10	102
19	40	(Australia) Tyler Everingham (Australia) Jayden Ojeda	Garry Rogers Motorsport	Holden Commodore ZB	121	+40 Laps	24	96
Ret	34	(Australia) Jake Kostecki (Australia) Zane Goddard	Matt Stone Racing	Holden Commodore ZB	155	Accident	25	
Ret	4	(Australia) Jack Smith (Australia) Jack Perkins	Brad Jones Racing	Holden Commodore ZB	149	Accident	22	
Ret	2	(Australia) Bryce Fullwood (Australia) Kurt Kostecki	Walkinshaw Andretti United	Holden Commodore ZB	147	Accident	11	
Ret	35	(Australia) Garry Jacobson (Australia) David Russell	Matt Stone Racing	Holden Commodore ZB	62	Engine	21	
Ret	14	(Australia) Todd Hazelwood (Australia) Jordan Boys	Brad Jones Racing	Holden Commodore ZB	50	Accident	16	
Ret	888	(Australia) Jamie Whincup (Australia) Craig Lowndes	Triple Eight Race Engineering	Holden Commodore ZB	32	Accident	9	

== Broadcast ==
The event telecast was produced by Supercars Media and carried domestically by Fox Sports Australia (via Fox Sports 506 and Kayo Sports), a paid service which covered all sessions including support categories, and Network 10 (via free-to-air channels 10 and 10HD), which covered select sessions from midday Friday onwards.

Fox Sports	Network 10
Host: Jessica Yates; Booth: Neil Crompton, Mark Skaife; Pit-lane: Riana Crehan, Andrew Jones, Mark Larkham	Presenters: Grant Denyer; Pundit: Rick Kelly; Roving: Sam Charlwood, Kate Peck
