= 2022 S5000 Tasman Series =

Motor racing competition

The 2022 S5000 Tasman Series, known by its sponsored identity the Shannons S5000 Tasman Series, was the 14th season of the revived Tasman Series, and the second Tasman Series using S5000 machinery and therefore the S5000 moniker. It was held in October, and December of 2022.

Nathan Herne, driving for Garry Rogers Motorsport, won the title after winning four of the six races.

== Teams and drivers ==
All teams competed with identical Rogers AF01/V8 single-seater racecars, Ligier/Onroak chassis powered by Ford Coyote V8 engines. For the 2022 season, a Pro-Am class was introduced.

Team	No.	Driver	Class	Rounds	Ref
Team BRM	17	(Australia) Mark Rosser	PA	All	
Team BRM	27	(Australia) Joey Mawson		All	
Team BRM	56	(Italy) Giancarlo Fisichella		2	
Garry Rogers Motorsport	18	(Australia) Aaron Cameron		2	
Garry Rogers Motorsport	22	(Australia) Sebastian Amadio		2	
Garry Rogers Motorsport	29	(Australia) Nathan Herne		All	
Garry Rogers Motorsport	49	(Australia) Jordan Boys		All	
Garry Rogers Motorsport	65	(Australia) Noah Sands		All	
Vircura H1 Racing	20	(Australia) Brad Gartner		2	
Tim Macrow Racing	23	(Australia) Tim Macrow		2	
Versa Motorsport	37	(Australia) Cooper Webster		All	
Versa Motorsport	48	(Australia) Blake Purdie		2	
Bargwanna Motorsport	71	(Australia) Ben Bargwanna		All	
Bargwanna Motorsport	79	(Australia) Jude Bargwanna		All	
88Racing	88	(Australia) Elly Morrow		All	

- Shae Davies planned to enter the first round with Versa Motorsport, but did not take part in the event.

== Calendar ==
The 2022 calendar was announced on 15 December 2021. After the 2022 Supercars Championship, which the Tasman Series supported, changed its calendar, the Sydney round was moved forward, resulting in it being dropped from the Tasman Series calendar. In June, it was clarified that the Tasman Series would have two rounds, while the addition of a third event would be investigated. In August, it was announced that Adelaide would join the calendar as final round. The second round of the championship, planned to be held at Mount Panorama Circuit, was later replaced by a series of non-championship demonstration runs.

Round	Circuit	Location	Date
1	(Queensland) Surfers Paradise Street Circuit	Surfers Paradise, Queensland	29–30 October
2	(South Australia) Adelaide Street Circuit	Adelaide, South Australia	1–4 December

== Race results ==
Round		Circuit	Date	Pole position	Fastest lap	Winning driver	Winning entrant
1	R1	(Queensland) Surfers Paradise Street Circuit	29 October	(Australia) Nathan Herne	(Australia) Joey Mawson	(Australia) Nathan Herne	Garry Rogers Motorsport
1	R2	(Queensland) Surfers Paradise Street Circuit	30 October		(Australia) Joey Mawson	(Australia) Nathan Herne	Garry Rogers Motorsport
1	R3	(Queensland) Surfers Paradise Street Circuit	30 October		(Australia) Joey Mawson	(Australia) Nathan Herne	Garry Rogers Motorsport
2	R4	(South Australia) Adelaide Street Circuit	2 December	(Australia) Aaron Cameron	(Australia) Joey Mawson	(Australia) Nathan Herne	Garry Rogers Motorsport
2	R5	(South Australia) Adelaide Street Circuit	3 December		(Australia) Joey Mawson	(Australia) Joey Mawson	Team BRM
2	R6	(South Australia) Adelaide Street Circuit	4 December		(Australia) Aaron Cameron	(Australia) Aaron Cameron	Garry Rogers Motorsport

== Season summary ==
The third S5000 Tasman series began with only nine entries at the Surfers Paradise Street Circuit. Nathan Herne set pole for the first race with the quickest lap ever around the track. Cooper Webster, who would have started alongside him, crashed late in qualifying, with his car not fixed in time for the race start. This meant Herne easily kept the lead, ahead of Joey Mawson and Jordan Boys. This top trio remained static until the end. A day later, Herne resumed where he left off, winning race two comfortably, once again ahead of Mawson, with Ben Bargwanna rounding out the podium this time. Race three was less smooth sailing for Herne: he almost collided with Mawson into turn one, with the latter then taking to the escape road and emerging in the lead. Mawson later had to give back that position, enabling Herne to sweep the weekend. Mawsons three second places saw him leave Surfers' Paradise 27 points behind Herne. Boys was once again third in race three and sat another 25 points back.

The field grew for round two, with fifteen cars tackling Adelaide Street Circuit. 2022 champion Aaron Cameron set another lap record in qualifying to claim pole, before being overtaken by Herne at the start and then crashing and retiring. Herne turned his comfortable lead into a fourth straight victory, with Mawson behind for a fourth straight second place and Webster third. Race two saw some drivers mistake the formation lap for the race start, causing a crash and a red flag. Herne's gearbox overheated mid-way through the race, making him finish only eleventh, while Mawson won the race. Webster and Blake Purdie completed the podium, with Herne now only one point ahead of Mawson going into the final race. This race then saw a controversial end to the season: the title contenders collided on lap three, with Mawson retiring immediately and Herne finishing 13th with a damaged car. Cameron won the race after starting last, with the rest of the podium identical to race two. While thirteenth place was enough for Herne to secure the title, Mawson was then also deducted 15 points after the stewards saw him at fault for the crash. This promoted Webster to second in the championship.

== Drivers' standings ==
Each of the two rounds started with a qualifying session, awarding ten points for pole position down to one point for 10th. The grid of the first two races was based on this qualifying result, with 30 points being awarded to the winner. The last race of each weekend marked the most important one, with a grid based on points scored over all previous weekend sessions and 60 points on offer for the winner.

Position	1st	2nd	3rd	4th	5th	6th	7th	8th	9th	10th	11th	12th	13th	14th	15th	Ret
Qualifying	10	9	8	7	6	5	4	3	2	1	0					0
First and second race	30	27	24	22	20	18	16	14	12	10	8	6	4	2	1	0
Main event	60	50	40	32	26	24	22	20	18	16	14	12	10	8	6	0

Pos.	Driver	SUR				ADE				Points
Pos.	Driver	Q	R1	R2	R3	Q	R4	R5	R6	Points
1	(Australia) Nathan Herne	1	1	1	1	2	1	11	13	187
2	(Australia) Cooper Webster	2	DNS	4	5	3	3	2	2	166
3	(Australia) Joey Mawson	3	2	2	2	4	2	1	Ret	161 (Note: Mawson was deducted 15 points for moving under braking in the final race.)
4	(Australia) Jordan Boys	4	3	7	3	6	5	4	4	158
5	(Australia) Ben Bargwanna	5	4	3	4	7	6	5	8	154
6	(Australia) Noah Sands	7	5	5	6	10	9	7	5	123
7	(Australia) Jude Bargwanna	6	6	6	7	11	10	8	9	105
8	(Australia) Aaron Cameron					1	Ret	6	1	88
9	(Australia) Blake Purdie					9	7	3	3	82
10	(Australia) Elly Morrow	9	8	9	9	15	14	10	12	70
11	(Australia) Mark Rosser	8	7	8	8	13	12	DNS	Ret	59
12	(Italy) Giancarlo Fisichella					5	4	Ret	6	52
13	(Australia) Tim Macrow					8	8	Ret	7	33
14	(Australia) Brad Gartner					14	13	9	11	30
15	(Australia) Sebastian Amadio					12	11	NC	10	24
Pos.	Driver	Q	R1	R2	R3	Q	R4	R5	R6	Points
Pos.	Driver	SUR				ADE				Points

== See also ==
- 2022 S5000 Australian Drivers' Championship
