= Australian Karting Association =

Kart racing sanctioning body

Karting Australia
- Jurisdiction: Australia
- (Australia)

The Australian Karting Association ltd Trading as Karting Australia (AKA) is the association formed in 1966 that was appointed by the FIA and Motorsport Australia to control and administer the CIK class kart racing in Australia.

The purposes of the AKA as outlined on its website include:

- The promotion and protection of kart racing
- The promotion of excellence and just & honourable practices in kart racing
- To suppress malpractices
- The promotion and organisation of kart meetings
- Other functions for members and to do all such acts that in the opinion of the AKA are for general benefit of members or of karting.

The AKA Inc has six member associations who represent individual states in Australia. These six state karting associations include:

- Karting Australia New South Wales (4 clubs)
- Karting Northern Territory (1 club)
- Karting Queensland (14 clubs)
- Karting South Australia (5 clubs)
- Karting Tasmania Inc. (4 clubs)
- Victorian Karting Association (17 clubs)
- Karting Western Australia (13 clubs)

Karting Australia's partners include Australian Tool company SP Tools and global Oils company Castrol.

== See also ==
- Motorsport in Australia
- Kart Racing
- Karting World Championship
