= S5000 Australian Drivers' Championship =

Open-wheel racing series in Australia

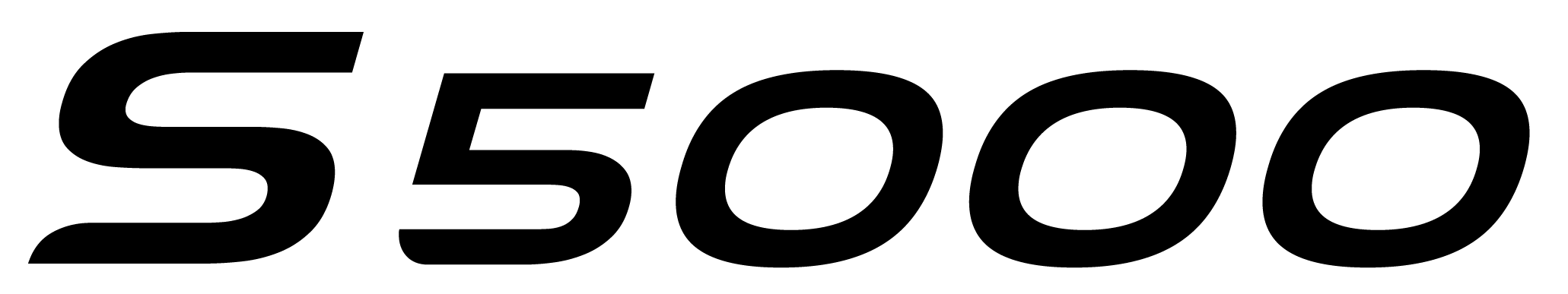
- Category: Single-seater
- Country: Australia; New Zealand
- Inaugural season: 2019
- Folded: 2024
- Constructors: Onroak Automotive
- Engine suppliers: Ford
- Tire suppliers: Hoosier
- Last Drivers' champion: (Australia) Aaron Cameron
- Official website: s5000.com.au

The VHT S5000 Australian Drivers' Championship (known originally as the Australian S5000 Championship, or simply S5000) was an open-wheel road racing series in Australia. The series was created by a merger between two proposed series, Formula Thunder 5000 and Super5000. The series was promoted by the Australian Racing Group.

The inaugural race of the series was originally set to be in Sydney Motorsport Park in May 2019, but was delayed to September due to supply issues from Ligier's Charlotte area factory where the chassis are manufactured.

The championship ran through to 2023, before being suspended for the 2024 season, though the promoters have hopes of reviving it.

It would be officially confirmed on January 9, 2025, that the S5000 Australian Drivers Championship would be permanently cancelled when the series promoter GRM announced intentions to sell its 15 remaining built chassis and spare parts inventory.

== History ==
Australian circuit racing has, since the end of Tasman Series racing in the 1970s, been heavily focused on touring car racing at the professional level. Open wheeler formula racing series such as Formula Holden and Formula 3 struggled to gain spectator and sponsor interest, and eventually folded.

The idea for a modern interpretation of the historic Formula 5000 class was first raised in 2016, and was initially called the Formula Thunder 5000. The original car used a Swift FN09 chassis that raced in Super Formula between 2009 and 2013.

A year later in 2017, the Super5000 series was later created by former Supercars CEO James Warburton, as part of his plan to sustain growth of motorsport in Australia. The series would originally be used as a support category for the Supercars series, alongside the Super2 and SuperUtes series. The creation of this series led to controversy, and the founder of Formula Thunder 5000, Chris Lambden, disapproved of the idea, claiming it would threaten his own plans.

Later that same year, both series announced a merger in a bid to further ensure the return of a formula racing series in Australia. The formation of the S5000 series came as a result, and would incorporate technical elements from both the Formula Thunder 5000 and the Super5000 series.

A preliminary schedule was originally announced in 2018, with Sydney Motorsport Park as the season opener. However, in April 2019, the organisers announced that the series would be delayed four months and that the inaugural season would instead kick off in September 2019 at Sandown Raceway, due to supply issues from Ligier's Charlotte area factory. The organisers also wanted to ensure that the S5000 car would be properly tested.

The first event attracted an entry of 13 drivers, including former Formula One driver Rubens Barrichello. The feature race was marred, however, by an accident involving Alex Davison which caused damage to safety barriers and forced organisers to red-flag the race after just 10 of the scheduled 25 laps. The race was won by James Golding, with Barrichello second and John Martin in third. A second event was held at The Bend, with the feature race being won by John Martin.

For 2020, a six-round championship was planned, set to start as a support event for the 2020 Australian Grand Prix held at Albert Park, with the championship to be followed by a non-championship race at Mount Panorama. It was also announced in early 2020 that the championship would see the revival of the Australian Drivers' Championship title, last awarded in 2014 Australian Drivers' Championship for Formula 3 cars. This was accompanied by a plan to award trophies named after prominent Australian racing drivers to the winners of each feature race, with the winner of the feature race at Albert Park to be awarded the Alan Jones Cup.

The opening round attracted a larger entry, including inaugural feature race winner Golding, two-time Australian Drivers' Champion Tim Macrow, and international entrants including the return of Barrichello and fellow Formula One veteran Giancarlo Fisichella, Formula 2 driver Jack Aitken and 2019 Bathurst 1000 winner Alexandre Prémat. After practice and qualifying sessions on Thursday 12 March, Golding had pole position. However, on Friday morning the entire Grand Prix meeting was called off as a result of the escalating COVID-19 pandemic, so no race was held. Due to ongoing difficulties surrounding the pandemic, modified calendars were announced a few times over the year, with plans made for a championship running over late 2020 into early 2021. In the end, however, no races were held in 2020 and instead a short four race calendar was announced to be run in early 2021, with a second, longer summer series to run from late 2021 to early 2022.

The first championship event, and first race of the 2021 season, finally got underway in January at Symmons Plains, with Thomas Randle winning the feature race.

== Suspension for 2024 ==
The championship was suspended at the end of the 2023 season. The promoters of the category pointed to the eligibility rules for licenses to drive in the Supercars Championship as the primary reason for its cessation. Drivers aspiring to drive in the full-professional Supercars championship were required to complete a minimum number of races in its direct feeder categories, Super2 and Super3, making S5000 a less attractive proposition for most young drivers, leading to unsustainably small entry fields. Other factors cited by the former category manager include the decision to ban the category from the Mount Panorama Circuit, and to run international FIA Formula 2 Championship and FIA Formula 3 Championship as support races at the Australian Grand Prix rather than the local category, and the promoter's decision to switch from "free-to-air" broadcasting to pay TV for coverage of the events.

The trademark to the name "Australian Drivers' Championship" name was registered by another party, and the Australian Auto Sport Alliance is sanctioning the 2024 Australian Drivers' Championship as a one-make series using the Hyper Racer X1.

== Car specification ==
The S5000 car's chassis is based on the Ligier JS F3, an FIA-compliant Formula 3 bespoke chassis manufactured by French motorsport company Onroak-Ligier. The car uses a 5.2-litre naturally-aspirated quad-cam Ford Coyote V8 that is modified by InnoV8, and has an output of 560 hp (420 kW; 570 PS) and 460 lb⋅ft (620 N⋅m) of torque. All of the power is driven through a 6-speed gearbox by Holinger. Holinger also supplies the transaxle. The suspension set and the wing package are supplied by Borland Racing Developments, and are then fabricated by Garry Rogers Motorsport, who also perform the assembly of the S5000 car. The tyres are supplied by Hoosier. The complete car was officially designated the Rogers AF01/V8 in 2021. The "Rogers" name refers to the assembler of the cars,.

The S5000 car has been certified by the FIA under the 2018 safety certification. The class introduced Push to Pass for the 2023 season, starting at Phillip Island in May.

The S5000 car made its first public appearance taking part in demonstration runs at the 2018 Newcastle 500 Supercars event with drivers such as Greg Murphy, John Bowe, and Garth Tander going behind the wheel. The race car received a positive reaction from the audience.

For a race at the Mount Panorama Circuit in 2021, they were restricted to approximately 475 hp because they exceeded the maximum power-to-weight ratio permitted for racing at that circuit.

== Media coverage ==
The races were aired on a variety of networks and streaming services, including via streaming service Stan Sport, and live-streamed by website Motorsport.com through their Motorsport.TV platform. Some races also appeared on the free-to-air network SBS.

== Champions ==
Year	Driver	Team
2019	Exhibition Series	
2020	Cancelled due to COVID-19 pandemic	
2021	(Australia) Joey Mawson	Team BRM
2022	(Australia) Joey Mawson	Team BRM
2023	(Australia) Aaron Cameron	Garry Rogers Motorsport
2024	Not held	
