= 2023 Race Sydney =

(Australia) 2023 Race Sydney
Race details
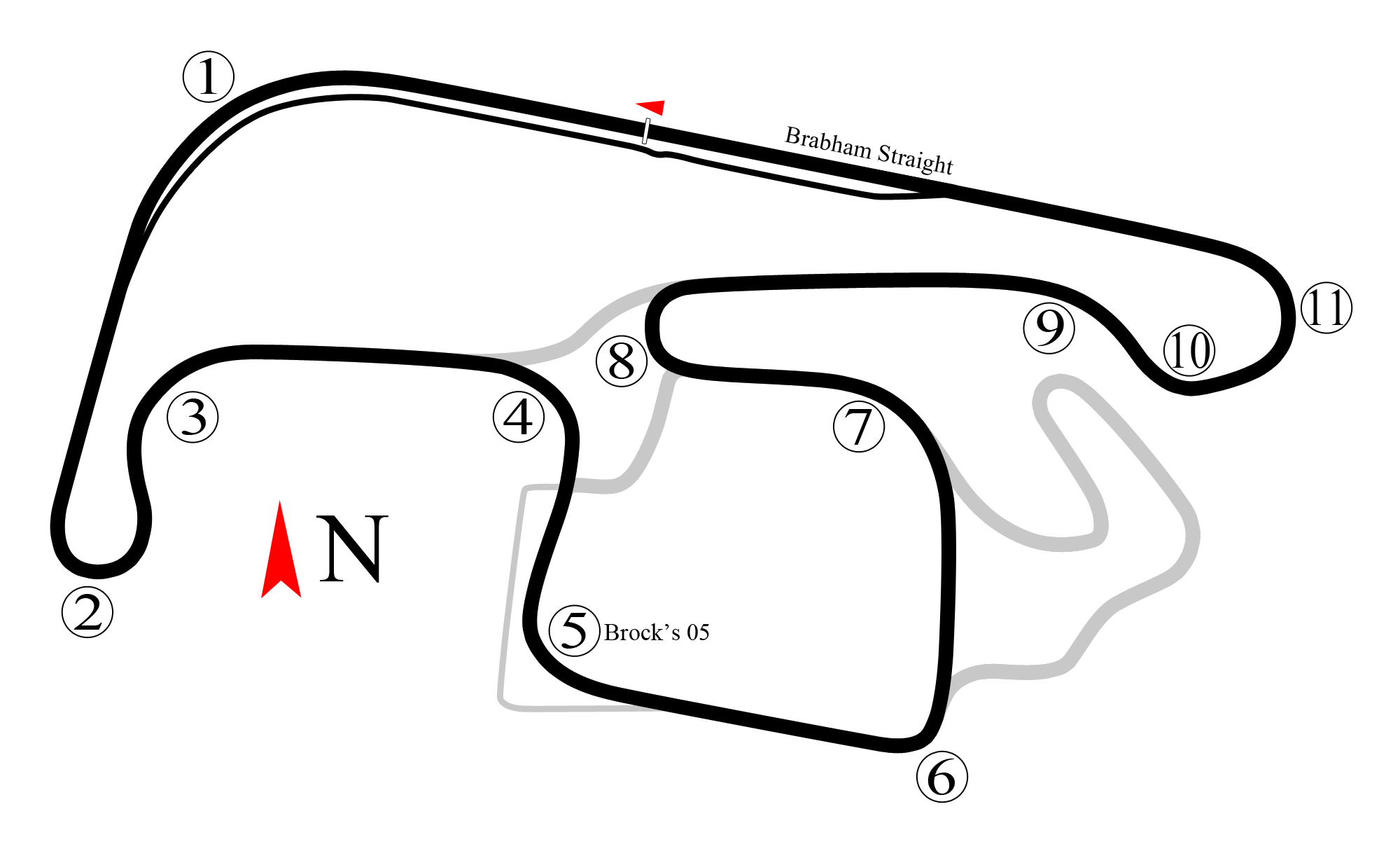
- Round 7 of 9 in the 2023 World Touring Car Championship at Sydney Motorsport Park in Eastern Creek, New South Wales.
- Date: 3–4 November, 2023
- Location: Eastern Creek, New South Wales
- Course: Sydney Motorsport Park; 3.93 kilometres (2.44 mi)
Pole position
Podium
Fastest Lap

2023 Race Sydney will be the seventh round of nine in the 2023 TCR World Tour. It is scheduled to be held on 3–4 November 2023 at Sydney Motorsport Park in Eastern Creek, New South Wales, Australia. The event will also be the sixth round of seven in the 2023 TCR Australia Touring Car Series.

== Report ==
=== Background ===
The event will be the first staging of an international touring car championship in Australia since the 1987 Calder Park 500, held as part of the 1987 World Touring Car Championship for Group A.

In the TCR World Tour standings, Norbert Michelisz led Yann Ehrlacher by 4 points in the drivers' championship, and Cyan Racing led BRC Racing Team by 116 points in the teams' championship. In the TCR Australia standings, Bailey Sweeny led Joshua Buchan by 30 points in the drivers' championship.

=== Entry list ===
A total of 25 cars have been entered, including entries from TCR World Tour and TCR Australia.

Team	Car	No.	Drivers	Class
(Australia) Wall Racing	Honda Civic Type R TCR (FL5)	1	(Australia) Tony D'Alberto	A
(France) Garry Rogers Motorsport	Peugeot 308 TCR	4	(France) Jimmy Clairet	A
(Australia) Melbourne Performance Centre	Audi RS 3 LMS TCR (2021)	9	(Australia) Will Brown	A
(Australia) Melbourne Performance Centre	Audi RS 3 LMS TCR (2017)	14	(Australia) Lachlan Mineeff	A
(Australia) Garry Rogers Motorsport	Peugeot 308 TCR	18	(Australia) Aaron Cameron	A
(Australia) Melbourne Performance Centre	Audi RS 3 LMS TCR (2017)	22	(Australia) Iain McDougall	A
(Australia) HMO Customer Racing	Hyundai Elantra N TCR	30	(Australia) Josh Buchan	A
(Australia) Garry Rogers Motorsport	Peugeot 308 TCR	33	(Australia) Jordan Cox	A
(Australia) Garry Rogers Motorsport	Peugeot 308 TCR	41	(Australia) Kody Garland	A
(France) Garry Rogers Motorsport	Peugeot 308 TCR	71	(Australia) Ben Bargwanna	A
(Australia) Wall Racing	Honda Civic Type R TCR (FK8)	74	(Australia) Brad Harris	A
(Australia) Wall Racing	Honda Civic Type R TCR (FK8)	76	(Australia) Will Harris	A
(Italy) BRC Racing Team	Hyundai Elantra N TCR	105	(Hungary) Norbert Michelisz	W
(Australia) Team Soutar Motorsport	Audi RS 3 LMS TCR (2021)	110	(Australia) Zac Soutar	A
(Sweden) Cyan Racing	Lynk & Co 03 FL TCR	111	(Sweden) Thed Björk	W
(Sweden) Cyan Racing	Lynk & Co 03 FL TCR	112	(Uruguay) Santiago Urrutia	W
(Australia) Ashley Seward Motorsport	Lynk & Co 03 TCR	115	(United Kingdom) Tom Oliphant	A
(Belgium) Comtoyou Racing	Audi RS 3 LMS TCR (2021)	122	(Belgium) Frédéric Vervisch	W
(Australia) Wall Racing	Honda Civic Type R TCR (FL5)	129	(Argentina) Néstor Girolami	W
(Australia) HMO Customer Racing	Hyundai i30 N TCR	130	(Australia) Bailey Sweeny	A
(Sweden) Cyan Racing	Lynk & Co 03 FL TCR	155	(China) Ma Qinghua	W
(Sweden) Cyan Racing	Lynk & Co 03 FL TCR	168	(France) Yann Ehrlacher	W
(Belgium) Comtoyou Racing	Audi RS 3 LMS TCR (2021)	179	(United Kingdom) Robert Huff	W
(Italy) BRC Racing Team	Hyundai Elantra N TCR	196	(Spain) Mikel Azcona	W

Icon	Status
W	TCR World Tour entries
A	TCR Australia entries

==== Entry changes ====
- Michael Clemente had withdrawn from the event due to budget issues.
- Kody Garland did not compete in the races as a result of excessive damage to his car following a technical failure-caused accident during the practice session.

=== Race 1 ===
The first race was held in wet conditions at night. Local driver Will Brown claimed victory having led the vast majority of the race, which had to be red-flagged just shy of halfway after a number of cars went off following a deluge of rain. World Tour drivers Mikel Azcona and Ma Qinghua completed the podium, with championship challenger Yann Ehrlacher penalised for a Safety Car infringement.

== Results ==
=== Practice summary ===
Session	No.	Driver	Team	Car	Time
Warm Up	30	(Australia) Joshua Buchan	(Australia) HMO Customer Racing	Hyundai Elantra N TCR	1:34.5825
Practice 1	111	(Sweden) Thed Björk	(Sweden) Cyan Racing	Lynk & Co 03 FL TCR	1:35.2179
Practice 2	111	(Sweden) Thed Björk	(Sweden) Cyan Racing	Lynk & Co 03 FL TCR	1:34.7565

=== Qualifying ===
Pos.	Cat.	No.	Driver	Team	Car	Times		Points	
Pos.	Cat.	No.	Driver	Team	Car	Qualifying 1	Qualifying 2	W	A
1	A	71	(Australia) Ben Bargwanna	(Australia) Garry Rogers Motorsport	Peugeot 308 TCR	+3.6770	1:37.8033	15	10
2	A	9	(Australia) Will Brown	(Australia) Melbourne Performance Centre	Audi RS 3 LMS TCR (2021)	+0.8491	+0.7921	10	7
3	W	196	(Spain) Mikel Azcona	(Italy) BRC Racing Team	Hyundai Elantra N TCR	1:40.8794	+1.0413	8	
4	A	130	(Australia) Bailey Sweeny	(Australia) HMO Customer Racing	Hyundai i30 N TCR	+1.3978	+1.5546	6	5
5	W	179	(United Kingdom) Robert Huff	(Belgium) Comtoyou Racing	Audi RS 3 LMS TCR (2021)	+2.4923	+3.8706	4	
6	W	155	(China) Ma Qinghua	(Sweden) Cyan Racing	Lynk & Co 03 FL TCR	+0.9856	+4.3068	2	
7	A	30	(Australia) Joshua Buchan	(Australia) HMO Customer Racing	Hyundai Elantra N TCR	+2.6810	+5.3960		3
8	W	105	(Hungary) Norbert Michelisz	(Italy) BRC Racing Team	Hyundai Elantra N TCR	+2.0434	+5.4137		
9	A	4	(France) Jimmy Clairet	(Australia) Garry Rogers Motorsport	Peugeot 308 TCR	+3.3295	+7.0083		2
10	A	110	(Australia) Zac Soutar	(Australia) Team Soutar Motorsport	Audi RS 3 LMS TCR (2021)	+2.6699	+7.2923		
11	A	22	(Australia) Iain McDougall	(Australia) Melbourne Performance Centre	Audi RS 3 LMS TCR (2017)	+4.1280			
12	W	129	(Argentina) Néstor Girolami	(Australia) Wall Racing	Honda Civic Type R TCR (FL5)	+4.3419			
13	W	168	(France) Yann Ehrlacher	(Sweden) Cyan Racing	Lynk & Co 03 FL TCR	+4.7326			
14	A	1	(Australia) Tony D'Alberto	(Australia) Wall Racing	Honda Civic Type R TCR (FL5)	+5.2848			
15	W	111	(Sweden) Thed Björk	(Sweden) Cyan Racing	Lynk & Co 03 FL TCR	+5.3777			
16	W	112	(Uruguay) Santiago Urrutia	(Sweden) Cyan Racing	Lynk & Co 03 FL TCR	+5.9688			
17	A	18	(Australia) Aaron Cameron	(Australia) Garry Rogers Motorsport	Peugeot 308 TCR	+6.6882			
18	A	115	(United Kingdom) Thomas Oliphant	(Australia) Ashley Seward Motorsport	Lynk & Co 03 FL TCR	+6.8936			
19	W	122	(Belgium) Frédéric Vervisch	(Belgium) Comtoyou Racing	Audi RS 3 LMS TCR (2021)	+7.8618			
20	A	74	(Australia) Bradley Harris	(Australia) Wall Racing	Honda Civic Type R TCR (FK8)	+8.6676			
21	A	33	(Australia) Jordan Cox	(Australia) Garry Rogers Motorsport	Peugeot 308 TCR	+9.7104			
22	A	76	(Australia) William Harris	(Australia) Wall Racing	Honda Civic Type R TCR (FK8)	+10.2376			
23	A	14	(Australia) Lachlan Mineeff	(Australia) Melbourne Performance Centre	Audi RS 3 LMS TCR (2017)	+15.0488			

=== Race 1 ===
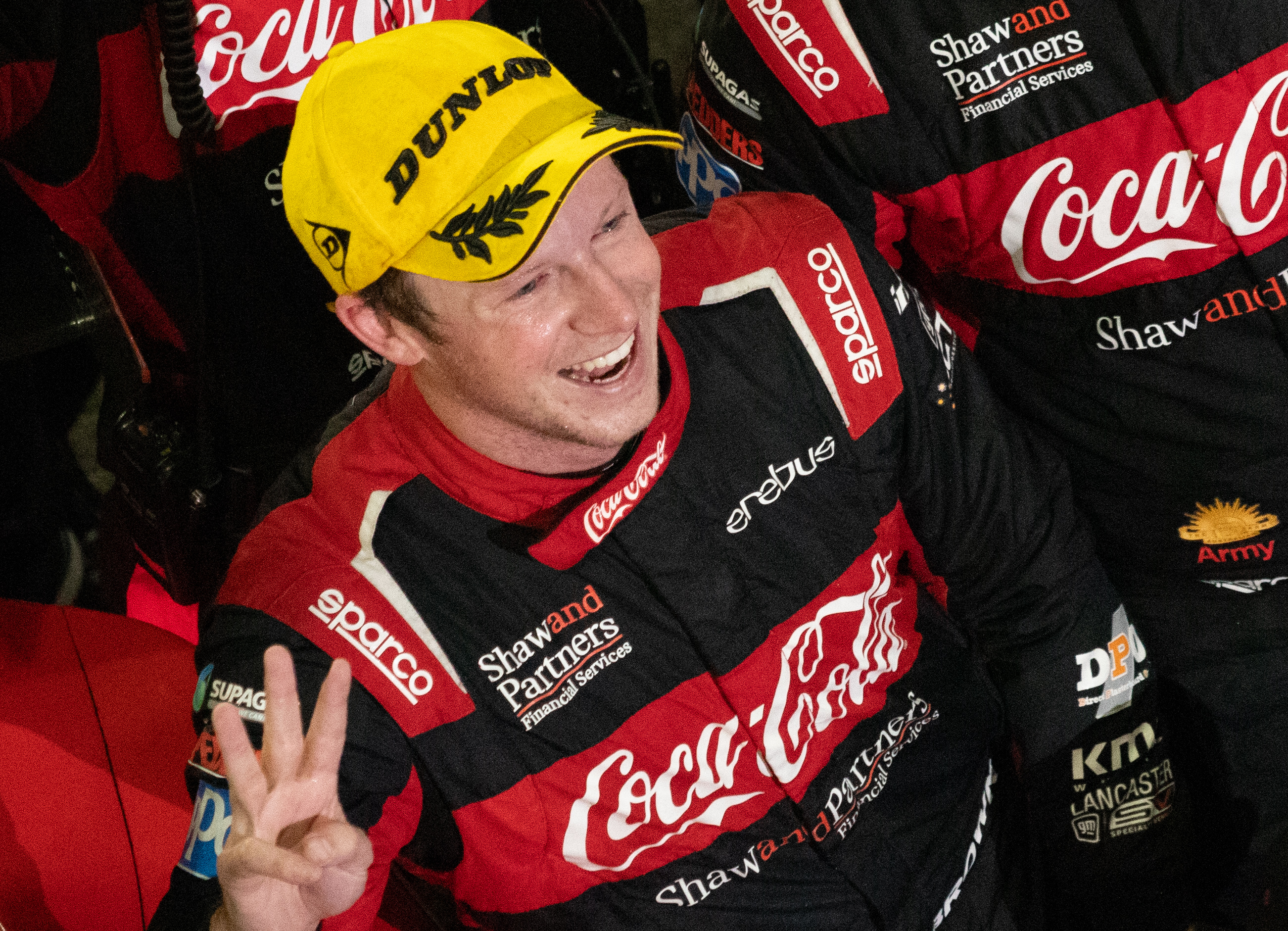
TCR Australia driver Will Brown won the first two races of the weekend.

Pos.	Cat.	No.	Driver	Team	Car	Laps	Time / Retired	Grid	Points	
Pos.	Cat.	No.	Driver	Team	Car	Laps	Time / Retired	Grid	W	A
1	A	9	(Australia) Will Brown	(Australia) Melbourne Performance Centre	Audi RS 3 LMS TCR (2021)	17	51:07.3619	2	30	50
2	W	196	(Spain) Mikel Azcona	(Italy) BRC Racing Team	Hyundai Elantra N TCR	17	+7.3892	3	25	
3	W	155	(China) Ma Qinghua	(Sweden) Cyan Racing	Lynk & Co 03 FL TCR	17	+11.6553	6	22	
4	W	179	(United Kingdom) Robert Huff	(Belgium) Comtoyou Racing	Audi RS 3 LMS TCR (2021)	17	+15.6957	5	20	
5	W	122	(Belgium) Frédéric Vervisch	(Belgium) Comtoyou Racing	Audi RS 3 LMS TCR (2021)	17	+15.9925	19	18	
6	W	168	(France) Yann Ehrlacher	(Sweden) Cyan Racing	Lynk & Co 03 FL TCR	17	+16.4280^{1}	13	16	
7	A	18	(Australia) Aaron Cameron	(Australia) Garry Rogers Motorsport	Peugeot 308 TCR	17	+16.6877	17	14	46
8	W	105	(Hungary) Norbert Michelisz	(Italy) BRC Racing Team	Hyundai Elantra N TCR	17	+19.4938	8	12	
9	W	111	(Sweden) Thed Björk	(Sweden) Cyan Racing	Lynk & Co 03 FL TCR	17	+19.9734	15	10	
10	W	129	(Argentina) Néstor Girolami	(Australia) Wall Racing	Honda Civic Type R TCR (FL5)	17	+20.6692	11	8	
11	A	33	(Australia) Jordan Cox	(Australia) Garry Rogers Motorsport	Peugeot 308 TCR	17	+20.9922	21	6	44
12	A	115	(United Kingdom) Thomas Oliphant	(Australia) Ashley Seward Motorsport	Lynk & Co 03 FL TCR	17	+27.8268	18	4	42
13	A	14	(Australia) Lachlan Mineeff	(Australia) Melbourne Performance Centre	Audi RS 3 LMS TCR (2017)	17	+28.6374	23	3	40
14	A	130	(Australia) Bailey Sweeny	(Australia) HMO Customer Racing	Hyundai i30 N TCR	17	+30.0708	4	2	38
15	A	1	(Australia) Tony D'Alberto	(Australia) Wall Racing	Honda Civic Type R TCR (FL5)	17	+31.6319	14	1	36
16	A	30	(Australia) Joshua Buchan	(Australia) HMO Customer Racing	Hyundai Elantra N TCR	17	+32.4393	7		34
17	A	74	(Australia) Bradley Harris	(Australia) Wall Racing	Honda Civic Type R TCR (FK8)	17	+37.2872	20		32
18	A	71	(Australia) Ben Bargwanna	(Australia) Garry Rogers Motorsport	Peugeot 308 TCR	17	+38.1428	1		30
19	A	4	(France) Jimmy Clairet	(Australia) Garry Rogers Motorsport	Peugeot 308 TCR	17	+39.7776	12		28
20	A	22	(Australia) Iain McDougall	(Australia) Melbourne Performance Centre	Audi RS 3 LMS TCR (2017)	17	+43.6663	10		26
21	A	76	(Australia) William Harris	(Australia) Wall Racing	Honda Civic Type R TCR (FK8)	17	+53.7850	22		25
DNF	W	112	(Uruguay) Santiago Urrutia	(Sweden) Cyan Racing	Lynk & Co 03 FL TCR	12		16		
DNF	A	110	(Australia) Zac Soutar	(Australia) Team Soutar Motorsport	Audi RS 3 LMS TCR (2021)	2		9		
Fastest lap: Ma Qinghua (Cyan Racing), 1:37.0422
Sources:

- ^1 – Ehrlacher received a 5-second post-race time penalty for a safety car infringement.

=== Race 2 ===
Pos.	Cat.	No.	Driver	Team	Car	Laps	Time / Retired	Grid	Points	
Pos.	Cat.	No.	Driver	Team	Car	Laps	Time / Retired	Grid	W	A
1	A	9	(Australia) Will Brown	(Australia) Melbourne Performance Centre	Audi RS 3 LMS TCR (2021)	17	30:22.5969	10	30	40
2	W	179	(United Kingdom) Robert Huff	(Belgium) Comtoyou Racing	Audi RS 3 LMS TCR (2021)	17	+3.4963	7	25	
3	W	122	(Belgium) Frédéric Vervisch	(Belgium) Comtoyou Racing	Audi RS 3 LMS TCR (2021)	17	+3.9116	6	22	
4	W	105	(Hungary) Norbert Michelisz	(Italy) BRC Racing Team	Hyundai Elantra N TCR	17	+4.9157	3	20	
5	A	30	(Australia) Joshua Buchan	(Australia) HMO Customer Racing	Hyundai Elantra N TCR	17	+5.4325	16	18	36
6	A	130	(Australia) Bailey Sweeny	(Australia) HMO Customer Racing	Hyundai i30 N TCR	17	+7.4825	14	16	34
7	A	115	(United Kingdom) Thomas Oliphant	(Australia) Ashley Seward Motorsport	Lynk & Co 03 FL TCR	17	+8.0442	12	14	32
8	A	18	(Australia) Aaron Cameron	(Australia) Garry Rogers Motorsport	Peugeot 308 TCR	17	+8.1952^{1}	4	12	30
9	W	168	(France) Yann Ehrlacher	(Sweden) Cyan Racing	Lynk & Co 03 FL TCR	17	+12.8564	5	10	
10	W	112	(Uruguay) Santiago Urrutia	(Sweden) Cyan Racing	Lynk & Co 03 FL TCR	17	+14.1491	22	8	
11	A	14	(Australia) Lachlan Mineeff	(Australia) Melbourne Performance Centre	Audi RS 3 LMS TCR (2017)	17	+17.4328	13	6	28
12	A	1	(Australia) Tony D'Alberto	(Australia) Wall Racing	Honda Civic Type R TCR (FL5)	17	+18.8901	15	4	26
13	A	74	(Australia) Bradley Harris	(Australia) Wall Racing	Honda Civic Type R TCR (FK8)	17	+19.8984	17	3	24
14	A	33	(Australia) Jordan Cox	(Australia) Garry Rogers Motorsport	Peugeot 308 TCR	17	+21.0085	11	2	22
15	A	76	(Australia) William Harris	(Australia) Wall Racing	Honda Civic Type R TCR (FK8)	17	+23.0228	21	1	20
16	A	110	(Australia) Zac Soutar	(Australia) Team Soutar Motorsport	Audi RS 3 LMS TCR (2021)	17	+25.8094^{2}	23		18
17	A	4	(France) Jimmy Clairet	(Australia) Garry Rogers Motorsport	Peugeot 308 TCR	17	+28.5379^{2}	19		16
18	A	22	(Australia) Iain McDougall	(Australia) Melbourne Performance Centre	Audi RS 3 LMS TCR (2017)	17	+35.4432	20		15
19	W	196	(Spain) Mikel Azcona	(Italy) BRC Racing Team	Hyundai Elantra N TCR	16	+1 lap	8		
DNF	A	71	(Australia) Ben Bargwanna	(Australia) Garry Rogers Motorsport	Peugeot 308 TCR	15	Misfire^{1}	18		
DNF	W	111	(Sweden) Thed Björk	(Sweden) Cyan Racing	Lynk & Co 03 FL TCR	7	Crash damage	2		
DNF	W	155	(China) Ma Qinghua	(Sweden) Cyan Racing	Lynk & Co 03 FL TCR	7	Crash damage	9		
DNF	W	129	(Argentina) Néstor Girolami	(Australia) Wall Racing	Honda Civic Type R TCR (FL5)	2		1		
Fastest lap: Joshua Buchan (HMO Customer Racing), 1:36.0981
Sources:

- ^1 – Cameron and Bargwanna received five-second post-race time penalties for false starts.
- ^2 – Soutar and Clairet received five-second post-race time penalties for exceeding track limits.

=== Race 3 ===
Pos.	Cat.	No.	Driver	Team	Car	Laps	Time / Retired	Grid	Points	
Pos.	Cat.	No.	Driver	Team	Car	Laps	Time / Retired	Grid	W	A
1	W	179	(United Kingdom) Robert Huff	(Belgium) Comtoyou Racing	Audi RS 3 LMS TCR (2021)	17	27:33.0141	2	30	
2	W	105	(Hungary) Norbert Michelisz	(Italy) BRC Racing Team	Hyundai Elantra N TCR	17	+4.3310	4	25	
3	A	9	(Australia) Will Brown	(Australia) Melbourne Performance Centre	Audi RS 3 LMS TCR (2021)	17	+7.3299^{1}	1	22	50
4	W	122	(Belgium) Frédéric Vervisch	(Belgium) Comtoyou Racing	Audi RS 3 LMS TCR (2021)	17	+9.4385^{1}	3	20	
5	A	30	(Australia) Joshua Buchan	(Australia) HMO Customer Racing	Hyundai Elantra N TCR	17	+12.9729	9	18	46
6	W	196	(Spain) Mikel Azcona	(Italy) BRC Racing Team	Hyundai Elantra N TCR	17	+24.9618	7	16	
7	W	168	(France) Yann Ehrlacher	(Sweden) Cyan Racing	Lynk & Co 03 FL TCR	17	+25.1915	5	14	
8	W	129	(Argentina) Néstor Girolami	(Australia) Wall Racing	Honda Civic Type R TCR (FL5)	17	+25.9300	19	12	
9	W	155	(China) Ma Qinghua	(Sweden) Cyan Racing	Lynk & Co 03 FL TCR	17	+25.9717	11	10	
10	A	1	(Australia) Tony D'Alberto	(Australia) Wall Racing	Honda Civic Type R TCR (FL5)	17	+26.0663	13	8	44
11	A	130	(Australia) Bailey Sweeny	(Australia) HMO Customer Racing	Hyundai i30 N TCR	17	+26.2050	8	6	42
12	W	112	(Uruguay) Santiago Urrutia	(Sweden) Cyan Racing	Lynk & Co 03 FL TCR	17	+26.6346	22	4	
13	A	115	(United Kingdom) Thomas Oliphant	(Australia) Ashley Seward Motorsport	Lynk & Co 03 FL TCR	17	+26.9020	10	3	40
14	A	14	(Australia) Lachlan Mineeff	(Australia) Melbourne Performance Centre	Audi RS 3 LMS TCR (2017)	17	+27.3049	12	2	38
15	W	111	(Sweden) Thed Björk	(Sweden) Cyan Racing	Lynk & Co 03 FL TCR	17	+28.9423	15	1	
16	A	33	(Australia) Jordan Cox	(Australia) Garry Rogers Motorsport	Peugeot 308 TCR	17	+33.2414	16		36
17	A	110	(Australia) Zac Soutar	(Australia) Team Soutar Motorsport	Audi RS 3 LMS TCR (2021)	17	+33.6504	23		34
18	A	18	(Australia) Aaron Cameron	(Australia) Garry Rogers Motorsport	Peugeot 308 TCR	17	+34.0631	6		32
19	A	74	(Australia) Bradley Harris	(Australia) Wall Racing	Honda Civic Type R TCR (FK8)	17	+34.7797	14		30
20	A	4	(France) Jimmy Clairet	(Australia) Garry Rogers Motorsport	Peugeot 308 TCR	17	+35.2755	17		28
21	A	22	(Australia) Iain McDougall	(Australia) Melbourne Performance Centre	Audi RS 3 LMS TCR (2017)	17	+54.5130	21		26
22	A	76	(Australia) William Harris	(Australia) Wall Racing	Honda Civic Type R TCR (FK8)	17	+1:21.9377	20		25
DNF	A	71	(Australia) Ben Bargwanna	(Australia) Garry Rogers Motorsport	Peugeot 308 TCR	11	Turbo	18		
Fastest lap: Mikel Azcona (BRC Racing Team), 1:36.0279
Sources:

- ^1 – Brown and Vervisch received five-second post-race time penalties for false starts.

== Championship standings ==
TCR World Tour drivers' standings

Pos	Pilot	Pts	Gap
1	(Hungary) Norbert Michelisz	327	
2	(United Kingdom) Robert Huff	326	-1
3	(France) Yann Ehrlacher	306	-21
4	(Spain) Mikel Azcona	289	-38
5	(Belgium) Frédéric Vervisch	257	-70

TCR World Tour teams' standings

Pos	Driver	Pts	Gap
1	(Sweden) Cyan Racing	727	
2	(Italy) BRC Racing Team	626	-101
3	(Belgium) Comtoyou Racing	610	-117

TCR Australia drivers' standings

Pos	Driver	Pts	Gap
1	(Australia) Bailey Sweeny	708	
2	(Australia) Joshua Buchan	679	-29
3	(Australia) Aaron Cameron	659	-49
4	(Australia) Tony D'Alberto	612	-96
5	(Australia) Jordan Cox	598	-110

- Note: Only the top five positions are included for both sets of drivers' standings.

Previous race: 2023 La Pedrera TCR World Tour round	TCR World Tour; 2023 season	Next race: 2023 Bathurst International
