= 2023 TCR Australia Touring Car Series =

Motor racing competition

The 2023 TCR Australia Series (known for sponsorship reasons as the 2023 Supercheap Auto TCR Australia Series) was the fourth season of the TCR Australia Touring Car Series. The series ran as part of SpeedSeries and featured two rounds as part of TCR World Tour.

The series was won by Josh Buchan in a Hyundai Elantra N TCR.

== Calendar ==
Race is part of TCR World Tour

Round	Circuit	Location	Date
1	(Tasmania) Symmons Plains Raceway	Launceston, Tasmania	24–26 February
2	(Victoria (state)) Phillip Island Grand Prix Circuit	Phillip Island, Victoria	12–14 May
3	(Victoria (state)) Winton Motor Raceway	Winton, Victoria	9–11 June
4	Queensland Raceway	Ipswich, Queensland	11–13 August
5	(Victoria (state)) Sandown Raceway	Melbourne, Victoria	8–10 September
6	(New South Wales) Sydney Motorsport Park	Eastern Creek, New South Wales	3–5 November
7	(New South Wales) Mount Panorama Circuit	Bathurst, New South Wales	10–12 November

== Entry list ==
The following teams and drivers are under contract to compete in the 2023 championship. Kumho is the new official tire supplier.

Team	Car	No.	Drivers	Class	Rounds	Ref.
(Australia) Wall Racing (Note: Cars #1 and #129 entered under the commercial title "Honda Racing Team Wall", Cars #74 and #76 entered under the commercial title "Exclusive Switchboards".)	Honda Civic Type R TCR (FK8)	1	(Australia) Tony D'Alberto		1–5	
(Australia) Wall Racing	Honda Civic Type R TCR (FL5)	1	(Australia) Tony D'Alberto		6–7	
(Australia) Wall Racing	Honda Civic Type R TCR (FL5)	129	(Argentina) Néstor Girolami	W	6–7	
(Australia) Wall Racing	Honda Civic Type R TCR (FK8)	74	(Australia) Brad Harris		2–4, 6–7	
(Australia) Wall Racing	Honda Civic Type R TCR (FK8)	76	(Australia) Will Harris		6–7	
(Australia) Melbourne Performance Centre (Note: Car #9 entered under the commercial title "MPC – Audi Liqui Moly Racing Team".)	Audi RS 3 LMS TCR (2017)	4	(Australia) Clay Richards		3	
(Australia) Melbourne Performance Centre	Audi RS 3 LMS TCR (2017)	14	(Australia) Lachlan Mineeff		All	
(Australia) Melbourne Performance Centre	Audi RS 3 LMS TCR (2021)	9	(Australia) Will Brown		1–2, 4–7	
(Australia) Garry Rogers Motorsport (Note: Cars #4 and #6 entered under the commercial title "GRM – Team Clairet Sport", Cars #18 and #41 entered under the commercial title "GRM Team Valvoline", Car #33 entered under the commercial title "GRM Team Schaeffler", Car #71 entered under the commercial title "Burson Auto Parts Racing".)	Peugeot 308 TCR	4	(Australia) Clay Richards		5	
(Australia) Garry Rogers Motorsport	Peugeot 308 TCR	4	(France) Jimmy Clairet		6	
(Australia) Garry Rogers Motorsport	Peugeot 308 TCR	4	(France) Teddy Clairet		7	
(Australia) Garry Rogers Motorsport	Peugeot 308 TCR	18	(Australia) Aaron Cameron		All	
(Australia) Garry Rogers Motorsport	Peugeot 308 TCR	33	(Australia) Jordan Cox		All	
(Australia) Garry Rogers Motorsport	Peugeot 308 TCR	41	(Australia) Kody Garland		All	
(Australia) Garry Rogers Motorsport	Peugeot 308 TCR	71	(Australia) Ben Bargwanna		All	
(Australia) Ashley Seward Motorsport	Lynk & Co 03 TCR	11	(Australia) Tim Slade		4	
(Australia) Ashley Seward Motorsport	Lynk & Co 03 TCR	115	(United Kingdom) Tom Oliphant		2, 5–7	
(Australia) Ashley Seward Motorsport	Alfa Romeo Giulietta Veloce TCR	115	(United Kingdom) Tom Oliphant		1, 3	
(United Kingdom) Carl Cox Motorsport	Audi RS 3 LMS TCR (2017)	15	(Australia) Michael Clemente		1	
(United Kingdom) Carl Cox Motorsport	Cupra León Competición TCR	15	(Australia) Michael Clemente		2–5, 7	
(Australia) Challenge Motorsport	Audi RS 3 LMS TCR (2017)	22	(Australia) Iain McDougall		1, 3, 5–7	
(Australia) HMO Customer Racing	Hyundai Elantra N TCR	30	(Australia) Josh Buchan		All	
(Australia) HMO Customer Racing	Hyundai i30 N TCR	130	(Australia) Bailey Sweeny		All	
(Italy) BRC Racing Team (Note: Cars #105 and #196 entered under the commercial title "BRC Hyundai N Squadra Corse".)	Hyundai Elantra N TCR	105	(Hungary) Norbert Michelisz	W	6–7	
(Italy) BRC Racing Team	Hyundai Elantra N TCR	196	(Spain) Mikel Azcona	W	6–7	
(Australia) Team Soutar Motorsport (Note: Car #110 entered under the commercial title "Tufflift Racing".)	Audi RS 3 LMS TCR (2021)	110	(Australia) Zac Soutar		All	
(Sweden) Cyan Racing (Note: Cars #111, #112, #155 and #168 entered under the commercial title "Cyan Racing Lynk & Co".)	Lynk & Co 03 FL TCR	111	(Sweden) Thed Björk	W	6–7	
(Sweden) Cyan Racing	Lynk & Co 03 FL TCR	112	(Uruguay) Santiago Urrutia	W	6–7	
(Sweden) Cyan Racing	Lynk & Co 03 FL TCR	155	(China) Ma Qing Hua	W	6–7	
(Sweden) Cyan Racing	Lynk & Co 03 FL TCR	168	(France) Yann Ehrlacher	W	6–7	
(Belgium) Comtoyou Racing (Note: Cars #122 and #179 entered under the commercial title "Audi Sport Team Comtoyou".)	Audi RS 3 LMS TCR (2021)	122	(Belgium) Frédéric Vervisch	W	6–7	
(Belgium) Comtoyou Racing	Audi RS 3 LMS TCR (2021)	179	(United Kingdom) Robert Huff	W	6–7	

Icon	Status
W	TCR World Tour entries not eligible to score points in the local series

=== Driver Changes ===
- Kody Garland will switch from driving Renault Mégane R.S TCR to Peugeot 308 TCR.
- Zac Soutar will switch from driving Honda Civic Type R TCR (FK8) to Audi RS 3 LMS TCR (2021).

=== Mid Season Changes ===
- Tom Oliphant missed the Queensland event due to him getting married. He was replaced by Tim Slade for the event.
- Michael Clemente missed the Race Sydney event due to lack of funding. He returned for Bathurst International.
- Kody Garland missed the Bathurst International event due to crash damage from the Race Sydney round.

== Summary ==
Round	Race	Event	Pole position	Fastest Lap	Winning Driver	Winning Team	Report
1	1	(Tasmania) Symmons Plains Raceway	(Australia) Will Brown	(Australia) Bailey Sweeny	(Australia) Bailey Sweeny	HMO Customer Racing	
1	2	(Tasmania) Symmons Plains Raceway		(Australia) Will Brown	(Australia) Aaron Cameron	Garry Rogers Motorsport	
1	3	(Tasmania) Symmons Plains Raceway		(Australia) Bailey Sweeny	(Australia) Bailey Sweeny	HMO Customer Racing	
2	1	(Victoria (state)) Phillip Island Grand Prix Circuit	(Australia) Josh Buchan	(Australia) Josh Buchan	(Australia) Josh Buchan	HMO Customer Racing	
2	2	(Victoria (state)) Phillip Island Grand Prix Circuit		(Australia) Brad Harris	(Australia) Michael Clemente	Carl Cox Motorsport	
2	3	(Victoria (state)) Phillip Island Grand Prix Circuit		(Australia) Josh Buchan	(Australia) Josh Buchan	HMO Customer Racing	
3	1	(Victoria (state)) Winton Motor Raceway	(Australia) Michael Clemente	(Australia) Bailey Sweeny	(Australia) Michael Clemente	Carl Cox Motorsport	
3	2	(Victoria (state)) Winton Motor Raceway		(Australia) Jordan Cox	(United Kingdom) Tom Oliphant	Ashley Seward Motorsport	
3	3	(Victoria (state)) Winton Motor Raceway		(Australia) Bailey Sweeny	(Australia) Bailey Sweeny	HMO Customer Racing	
4	1	Queensland Raceway	(Australia) Will Brown	(Australia) Will Brown	(Australia) Will Brown	Melbourne Performance Centre	
4	2	Queensland Raceway		(Australia) Will Brown	(Australia) Brad Harris	Wall Racing	
4	3	Queensland Raceway		(Australia) Will Brown	(Australia) Will Brown	Melbourne Performance Centre	
5	1	(Victoria (state)) Sandown Raceway	(Australia) Bailey Sweeny	(Australia) Will Brown	(Australia) Tony D'Alberto	Wall Racing	
5	2	(Victoria (state)) Sandown Raceway		(Australia) Will Brown	(Australia) Bailey Sweeny	HMO Customer Racing	
5	3	(Victoria (state)) Sandown Raceway		(Australia) Bailey Sweeny	(Australia) Bailey Sweeny	HMO Customer Racing	
6	1	(New South Wales) Sydney Motorsport Park	(Australia) Ben Bargwanna	(China) Ma Qing Hua	(Australia) Will Brown	Melbourne Performance Centre	Report
6	2	(New South Wales) Sydney Motorsport Park		(Australia) Josh Buchan	(Australia) Will Brown	Melbourne Performance Centre	Report
6	3	(New South Wales) Sydney Motorsport Park		(Spain) Mikel Azcona	(United Kingdom) Rob Huff	Comtoyou Racing	Report
7	1	(New South Wales) Mount Panorama Circuit	(Australia) Tony D'Alberto	(Uruguay) Santiago Urrutia	(Uruguay) Santiago Urrutia	Cyan Racing	Report
7	2	(New South Wales) Mount Panorama Circuit		(Australia) Tony D'Alberto	(Hungary) Norbert Michelisz	BRC Racing Team	Report
7	3	(New South Wales) Mount Panorama Circuit		(Argentina) Néstor Girolami	(France) Yann Ehrlacher	Cyan Racing	Report

== Driver's standings ==
=== Points system ===
The points system for 2023 was restructured. Races 1 and 3 award maximum points, while race 2, which features a starting grid based on reversed results from race 1, is worth slightly reduced points. Additionally, the top five drivers in qualifying now receive points instead of only the pole winner, and the driver who sets the fastest lap in a race receives points.

Position	**1st**	**2nd**	**3rd**	**4th**	**5th**	**6th**	**7th**	**8th**	**9th**	**10th**	**11th**	**12th**	**13th**	**14th**	**15th**	**16th**	**17th**	**18th**	**19th**	**20th**	**DNF**
Qualifying	10	7	5	3	2	0															0
Races 1 & 3	50	46	44	42	40	38	36	34	32	30	28	26	25	24	23	22	21	20	19	18	0
Race 2	40	36	34	32	30	28	26	24	22	20	18	16	15	14	13	12	11	10	9	8	0

- The driver who sets the fastest lap in a race receives one additional point.

=== Championship standings ===
Pos.	Driver	SYM (Tasmania)			PHI (Victoria (state))			WIN (Victoria (state))			QLD (Queensland)			SAN (Victoria (state))			SMP (New South Wales)			BAT (New South Wales)			Points
1	(Australia) Josh Buchan	6	9	9	**1**^{1}	10	1	4^{3}	3	2	5	6	6	8	5	7	16^{4}	5	5	8^{2}	11	11	809
2	(Australia) Tony D'Alberto	2^{3}	7	2	Ret^{3}	13	11	6^{4}	6	6	2^{3}	7	10	1^{4}	9	3	15	12	10	**3**^{1}	8	4	759
3	(Australia) Bailey Sweeny	1^{2}	6	1	4^{4}	5	5	2^{2}	5	1	DSQ^{2}	9	5	**5**^{1}	1	1	14^{3}	6	11	12	Ret	DSQ	748
4	(Australia) Aaron Cameron	8^{4}	1	4	3	6	6	14	8	10	7	2	2	2^{5}	2	2	7	8	18	9^{5}	2	Ret	743
5	(Australia) Lachlan Mineeff	9	2	7	2	12	10	8	4	5	12	10	7	6^{2}	3	Ret	13	11	14	20	15	15	659
6	(Australia) Jordan Cox	5	3	3	8	2	4	5	13	4	4^{5}	5	Ret	9	4	5	12	14	16	14	18	Ret	656
7	(Australia) Ben Bargwanna	4^{5}	Ret	8	5^{5}	3	3	7	9	9	6	8	9	7	6	6	**18**^{1}	Ret	Ret	Ret	12	10	602
8	(United Kingdom) Tom Oliphant	7	4	5	Ret	8	9	10	1	8				10	8	8	12	7	13	17	16	14	564
9	(Australia) Michael Clemente	10	5	10	6	1	2	**1**^{1}	DNS	Ret	9	4	8	Ret	10	4				Ret	14	12	504
10	(Australia) Zac Soutar	DNS	Ret	DNS	Ret^{2}	7	7	3^{5}	7	3	3	11	Ret	4^{3}	7	Ret	Ret^{5}	18	17	11^{3}	19	8	364
11	(Australia) Will Brown	**DNS**^{1}	Ret	DNS	Ret	11	8				**1**^{1}	3	1	3	Ret	DNS	1^{2}	1	3	13^{4}	Ret	DNS	442
12	(Australia) Brad Harris				9	4	13	13	11	12	10	1	3				17	13	19	18	Ret	DNS	389
13	(Australia) Kody Garland	3	10	6	7	9	12	12	12	7	8	13	Ret	12	11	9	DNS	DNS	DNS	WD	WD	WD	389
14	(Australia) Iain McDougall	11	8	11				11	10	11				11	12	Ret	20	17	21	19	17	13	364
15	(Australia) Clay Richards							9	2	Ret				Ret	13	10							98
16	(Australia) Tim Slade										11^{4}	12	4										89
17	(Australia) Will Harris																21	15	22	WD	WD	WD	72
World Tour full-time entries ineligible for points
—	(United Kingdom) Robert Huff																4	2	1	6	4	3	—
—	(Hungary) Norbert Michelisz																8	4	2	10	1	5	—
—	(France) Yann Ehrlacher																6	9	7	4	5	1	—
—	(Uruguay) Santiago Urrutia																NC	10	12	1	6	Ret	—
—	(Sweden) Thed Björk																9	Ret	15	5	3	2	—
—	(Argentina) Néstor Girolami																10	Ret	8	2	9	6	—
—	(China) Ma Qing Hua																2	Ret	9	16	13	9	—
—	(Belgium) Frédéric Vervisch																5	3	4	7	7	7	—
—	(Spain) Mikel Azcona																3	19	6	Ret	10	Ret	—
—	(France) Teddy Clairet																			15	DSQ	Ret	—
—	(France) Jimmy Clairet																19	16	20				—

Key
Colour	Result
Gold	Winner
Silver	Second place
Bronze	Third place
Green	Other points position
Blue	Other classified position
Blue	Not classified, finished (NC)
Purple	Not classified, retired (Ret)
Red	Did not qualify (DNQ)
Red	Did not pre-qualify (DNPQ)
Black	Disqualified (DSQ)
White	Did not start (DNS)
White	Race cancelled (C)
Blank	Did not practice (DNP)
Blank	Excluded (EX)
Blank	Did not arrive (DNA)
Blank	Withdrawn (WD)
Blank	Did not enter (cell empty)
Text formatting	Meaning
**Bold**	Pole position
Italics	Fastest lap

Notes:
^{1 2 3 4 5} – Qualifying positions
