= 2023 Bathurst International =

(Australia) 2023 Bathurst International
Race details
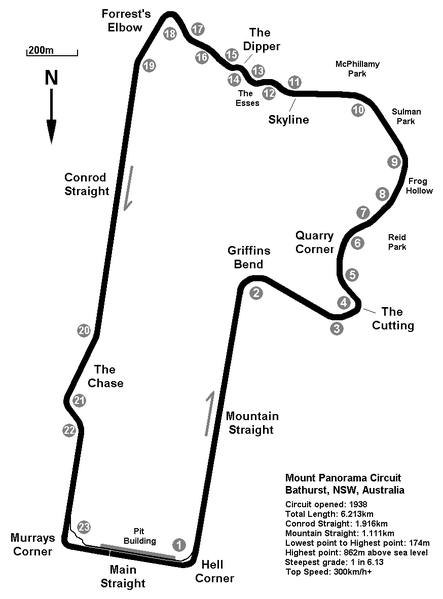
- Round 8 of 9 in the 2023 World Touring Car Championship at Mount Panorama Circuit in Bathurst, New South Wales.
- Date: 10–12 November, 2023
- Location: Bathurst, New South Wales
- Course: Mount Panorama Circuit; 6.213 kilometres (3.861 mi)
Pole position
Podium
Fastest Lap

2023 Bathurst International will be the eighth round of nine in the 2023 TCR World Tour. It is scheduled to be held on 10–12 November 2023 at the Mount Panorama Circuit in Bathurst, New South Wales, Australia. The event will also be the seventh and final round of the 2023 TCR Australia Touring Car Series.

== Entry list ==
A total of 25 cars have been entered, including entries from TCR World Tour and TCR Australia.

Team	Car	No.	Drivers	Class
(Australia) Wall Racing	Honda Civic Type R TCR (FL5)	1	(Australia) Tony D'Alberto	A
(France) Garry Rogers Motorsport	Peugeot 308 TCR	4	(France) Teddy Clairet	A
(Australia) Melbourne Performance Centre	Audi RS 3 LMS TCR (2021)	9	(Australia) Will Brown	A
(Australia) Melbourne Performance Centre	Audi RS 3 LMS TCR (2017)	14	(Australia) Lachlan Mineeff	A
(United Kingdom) Carl Cox Motorsport	Cupra León Competición TCR	15	(Australia) Michael Clemente	A
(Australia) Garry Rogers Motorsport	Peugeot 308 TCR	18	(Australia) Aaron Cameron	A
(Australia) Melbourne Performance Centre	Audi RS 3 LMS TCR (2017)	22	(Australia) Iain McDougall	A
(Australia) HMO Customer Racing	Hyundai Elantra N TCR	30	(Australia) Josh Buchan	A
(Australia) Garry Rogers Motorsport	Peugeot 308 TCR	33	(Australia) Jordan Cox	A
(France) Garry Rogers Motorsport	Peugeot 308 TCR	71	(Australia) Ben Bargwanna	A
(Australia) Wall Racing	Honda Civic Type R TCR (FK8)	74	(Australia) Brad Harris	A
(Australia) Wall Racing	Honda Civic Type R TCR (FK8)	76	(Australia) Will Harris	A
(Italy) BRC Racing Team	Hyundai Elantra N TCR	105	(Hungary) Norbert Michelisz	W
(Australia) Team Soutar Motorsport	Audi RS 3 LMS TCR (2021)	110	(Australia) Zac Soutar	A
(Sweden) Cyan Racing	Lynk & Co 03 FL TCR	111	(Sweden) Thed Björk	W
(Sweden) Cyan Racing	Lynk & Co 03 FL TCR	112	(Uruguay) Santiago Urrutia	W
(Australia) Ashley Seward Motorsport	Lynk & Co 03 TCR	115	(United Kingdom) Tom Oliphant	A
(Belgium) Comtoyou Racing	Audi RS 3 LMS TCR (2021)	122	(Belgium) Frédéric Vervisch	W
(Australia) Wall Racing	Honda Civic Type R TCR (FL5)	129	(Argentina) Néstor Girolami	W
(Australia) HMO Customer Racing	Hyundai i30 N TCR	130	(Australia) Bailey Sweeny	A
(Sweden) Cyan Racing	Lynk & Co 03 FL TCR	155	(China) Ma Qinghua	W
(Sweden) Cyan Racing	Lynk & Co 03 FL TCR	168	(France) Yann Ehrlacher	W
(Belgium) Comtoyou Racing	Audi RS 3 LMS TCR (2021)	179	(United Kingdom) Robert Huff	W
(Italy) BRC Racing Team	Hyundai Elantra N TCR	196	(Spain) Mikel Azcona	W

Icon	Status
W	TCR World Tour entries
A	TCR Australia entries

Previous race: 2023 Race Sydney	TCR World Tour; 2023 season	Next race: 2023 Guia Race of Macau
