= Nicolas Baert =

Belgian racing driver (born 2001)

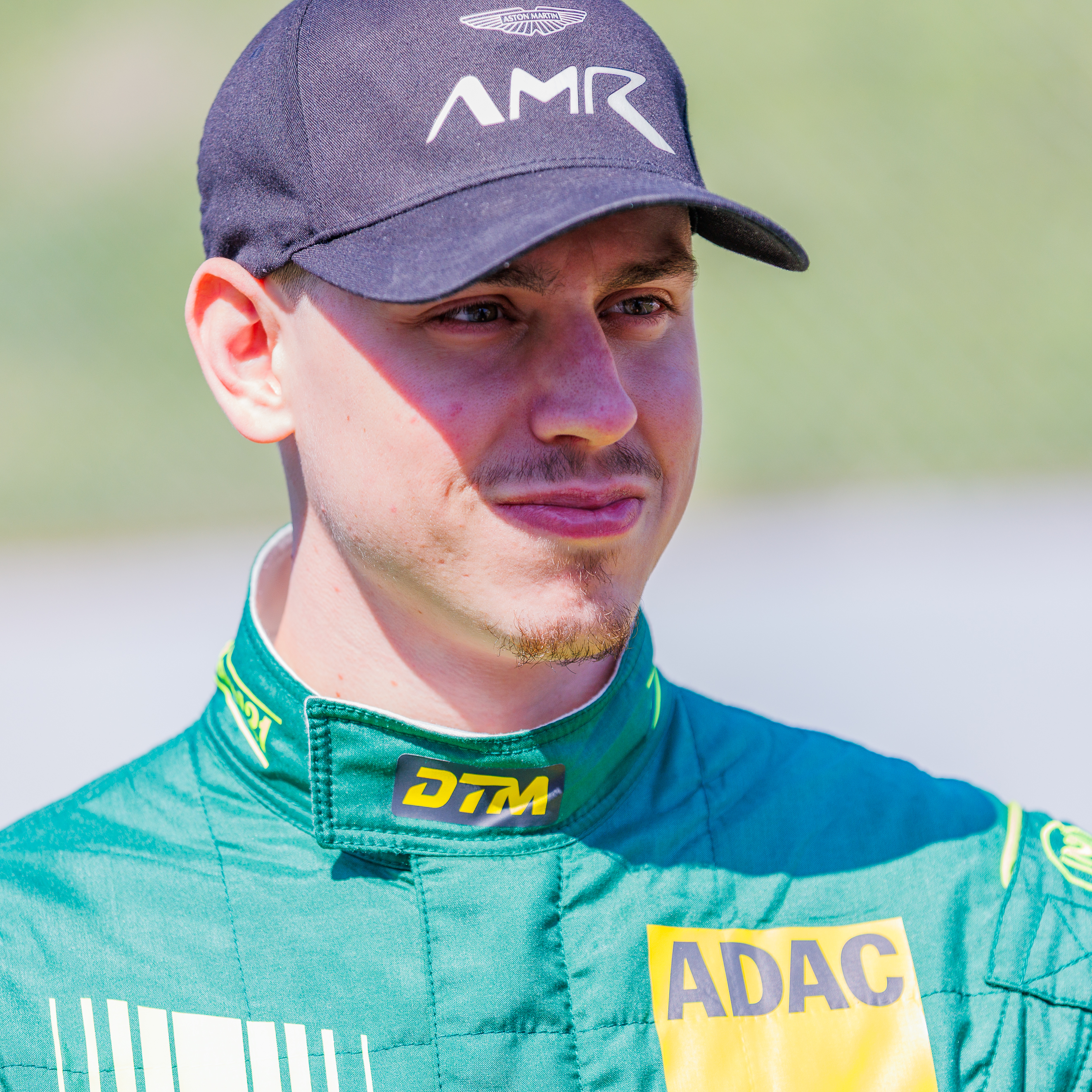
- Baert in 2025
- Nationality: (Belgium) Belgian
- Born: 8 August 2001 (age 25) Braine-l'Alleud, Belgium
- Relatives: Jean-Michel Baert (father)
- Categorisation: FIA Silver

Championship titles
- 2023: GT World Challenge Europe Endurance Cup – Gold

Nicolas Baert (born 8 August 2001 in Braine-l'Alleud) is a Belgian racing driver who last competed for Comtoyou Racing in Deutsche Tourenwagen Masters.

== Early career ==
Baert made his single-seater debut in 2019, joining MP Motorsport to compete in the F4 Spanish Championship. In his only year in single-seater competition, Baert scored a best result of fourth twice on his way to seventh in points. During 2019, Baert also represented Belgium in the first edition of the FIA Motorsport Games Formula 4 Cup.

Leaving single-seaters at the end of 2019, Baert joined Comtoyou Racing's three-car lineup to race in TCR Europe for 2020. Baert took his first pole and win at Zolder to finish third in the overall points and runner-up in the Benelux series. Near the end of 2020, Baert made a wildcard appearance at the Spain round of the World Touring Car Cup.

Baert remained with Comtoyou Racing for the 2021 TCR Europe season. Scoring a lone podium in the first round of the season at the Slovakia Ring, he finished seventh in points in his sophomore season in the series.

== GT career ==
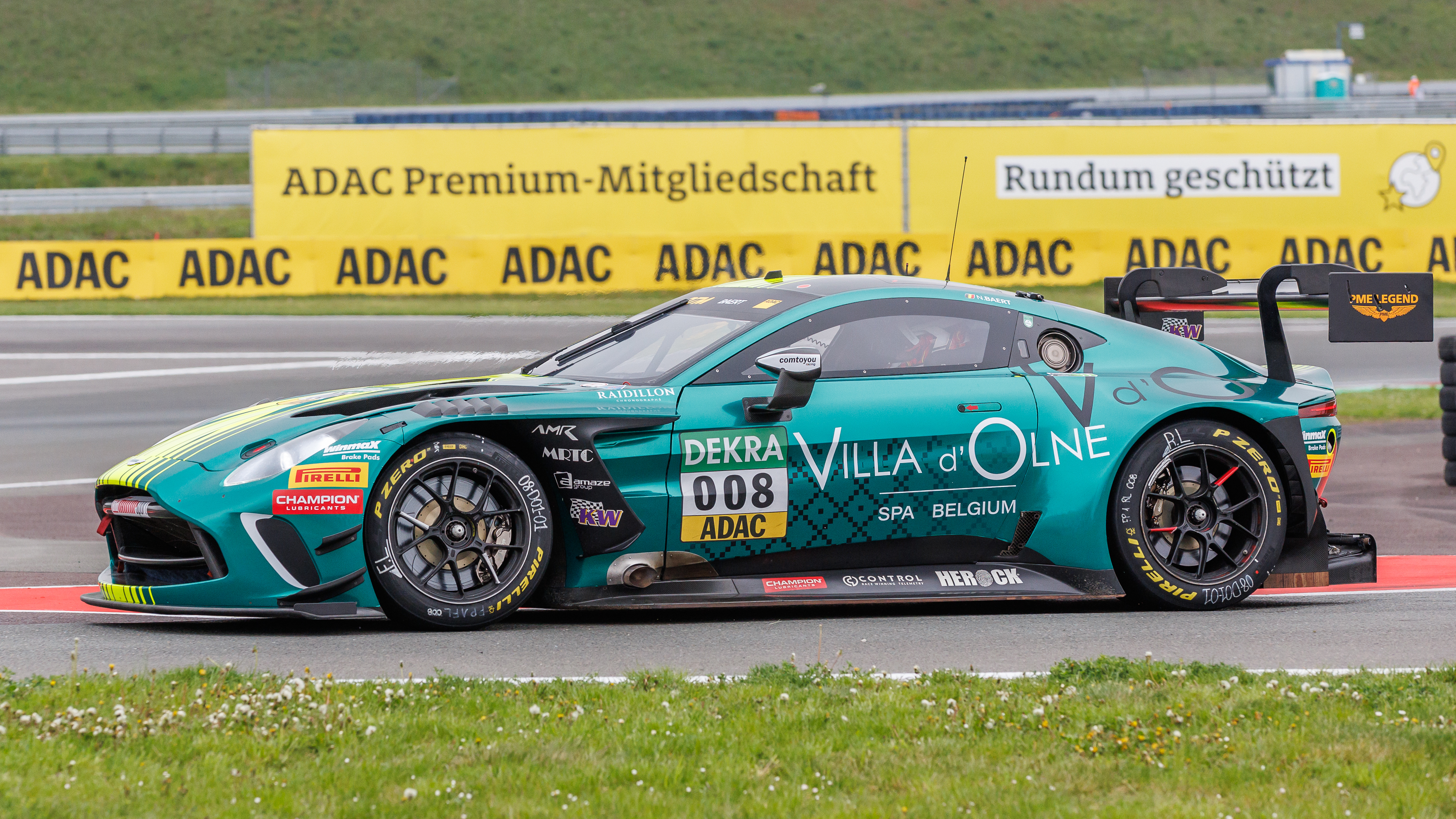
Baert at the Oschersleben round of the 2025 Deutsche Tourenwagen Masters season

Following two races in 2021 Intercontinental GT Challenge for Saintéloc Racing, Baert returned to the French team for 2022, competing in both the GT World Challenge Europe Endurance Cup and the GT World Challenge Europe Sprint Cup, driving an Audi R8 LMS Evo II. In the endurance cup, Baert scored a best result of 12th overall at Hockenheim and finished fifth in the Silver Cup standings. In the latter, Baert took a best result of sixth at Magny-Cours, which was also his only class win of the season as he finished fifth in the Silver Cup points.

The following year, Baert returned to fellow Audi team Comtoyou Racing ahead of 2023 for another double programme in both GT World Challenge Europe series. Racing in the Gold Cup in Endurance Cup, Baert won in class at Monza and Le Castellet, and scored a further class podium at the 24 Hours of Spa en route to the Gold Cup title at season's end. In the latter, Baert competed in the Pro Cup and scored one overall podium in race one at Hockenheim to finish eighth in points.

In 2024, Baert stayed with Comtoyou Racing, as the team switched to the Aston Martin Vantage AMR GT3 Evo, for a dual programme in both the GT World Challenge Europe Endurance Cup and the GT World Challenge Europe Sprint Cup. In the former, Baert scored two Silver Cup podiums at Monza and Jeddah, while in the latter, Baert took a lone overall podium at the season-finale in Barcelona.

Baert remained with Comtoyou Racing for 2025, staying in GT World Challenge Europe Endurance Cup and making his debut in Deutsche Tourenwagen Masters. Finishing 33rd in the Silver Cup class in the former, Baert then scored a lone points finish at the Norisring by finishing 13th in race two en route to a 24th-place points finish. The following year, Baert remained with his father's team for a second season in the Deutsche Tourenwagen Masters. In his second season in DTM, Bart took five points finishes with a best result of 12th at the Nürburgring to end the season 21st overall on eight points. During 2026, Baert also competed in the final two rounds of the GT World Challenge Europe Sprint Cup for Porsche-fielding Lionspeed GP, as well as dabbling between Comtoyou and HRT Ford Racing in the Endurance Cup, in which he took a Silver class win at the Nürburgring with the latter.

== Personal life ==
Baert is the son of Comtoyou Racing founder Jean-Michel Baert.

== Karting record ==
=== Karting career summary ===
Season	Series	Team	Position
2017	IAME International Open - X30 Senior	RSD Karting	57th
2017	IAME International Final - X30 Senior	Baert	NC
2018	IAME International Open Group B - X30 Senior	RSD Karting	10th
2018	Coupe de France - Senior	RSD Karting	NC

== Racing record ==
=== Racing career summary ===
Season	Series	Team	Races	Wins	Poles	F/Laps	Podiums	Points	Position
2019	F4 Spanish Championship	MP Motorsport	21	0	0	0	0	105	7th
2019	FIA Motorsport Games Formula 4 Cup	Team Belgium	2	0	0	0	0	N/A	DNF
2020	TCR Europe Touring Car Series	Comtoyou Racing	12	1	1	2	2	244	**3rd**
2020	World Touring Car Cup	Comtoyou Racing	3	0	0	0	0	0	NC†
2020	TCR Ibérico	Comtoyou Racing	2	0	0	0	0	9	17th
2020	24H TCE Series - TCR	Audi Sport Team Comtoyou	1	0	0	0	1	0	30th
2021	TCR Europe Touring Car Series	Comtoyou Racing	14	0	0	0	1	242	7th
2021	Nürburgring Langstrecken-Serie – SP3	Pit Lane – AMC Sankt Vith	3	0	0	0	0	0	NC
2021	Intercontinental GT Challenge	Saintéloc Racing	2	0	0	0	0	18	15th
2022	GT World Challenge Europe Endurance Cup	Saintéloc Junior Team	5	0	0	0	0	0	NC
2022	GT World Challenge Europe Endurance Cup – Silver	Saintéloc Junior Team	5	0	0	0	0	43	5th
2022	GT World Challenge Europe Sprint Cup	Saintéloc Junior Team	10	0	0	0	0	8.5	15th
2022	GT World Challenge Europe Sprint Cup – Silver	Saintéloc Junior Team	10	1	1	1	2	76	5th
2022	24H GT Series - GT3	Saintéloc Racing	1	0	0	0	1	0	NC
2022–23	Middle East Trophy - TCR	Autorama Motorsport by Wolf-Power Racing	1	0	0	0	1	0	NC
2023	GT World Challenge Europe Endurance Cup	Comtoyou Racing	5	0	0	0	0	8	18th
2023	GT World Challenge Europe Endurance Cup – Gold	Comtoyou Racing	5	2	0	1	3	104	**1st**
2023	GT World Challenge Europe Sprint Cup	Comtoyou Racing	10	0	0	0	1	27.5	8th
2023	TCR Spain	Comtoyou Racing	2	0	0	0	0	13	26th
2023	Nürburgring Langstrecken-Serie – VT2-R+4WD		1	0	0	0	0	0	NC
2024	GT World Challenge Europe Endurance Cup	Comtoyou Racing	5	0	0	0	0	0	NC
2024	GT World Challenge Europe Endurance Cup – Silver	Comtoyou Racing	5	0	0	0	2	47	12th
2024	GT World Challenge Europe Sprint Cup	Comtoyou Racing	9	0	0	0	1	17th	11th
2024	Nürburgring Langstrecken-Serie – BMW M2 CS	Comtoyou Racing	1	0	0	0	0	0	NC
2025	Middle East Trophy - GT3	Comtoyou Racing	1	0	0	0	0	0	NC
2025	Deutsche Tourenwagen Masters	Comtoyou Racing	16	0	0	0	0	3	24th
2025	GT World Challenge Europe Endurance Cup	Comtoyou Racing	5	0	0	0	0	0	NC
2025	GT World Challenge Europe Endurance Cup – Silver	Comtoyou Racing	5	0	0	0	0	8	33rd
2026	Deutsche Tourenwagen Masters	Comtoyou Racing	16	0	0	0	0	8	21st
2026	24H Series – GT3	Comtoyou Racing	1	0	0	0	0	16	22nd
2026	GT World Challenge Europe Endurance Cup	Comtoyou Racing	1	0	0	0	0	0	NC
2026	GT World Challenge Europe Endurance Cup	HRT Ford Racing	2	0	0	0	0	0	NC
2026	GT World Challenge Europe Endurance Cup – Silver	HRT Ford Racing	2	1	0	0	1	35	12th
2026	GT World Challenge Europe Sprint Cup	Lionspeed GP	4	0	0	0	0	0	NC†
2026	GT World Challenge Europe Sprint Cup – Silver	Lionspeed GP	4	0	1	0	0	0	NC†

† As Baert was a guest driver, he was ineligible to score points.

=== Complete F4 Spanish Championship results ===
(key) (Races in bold indicate pole position) (Races in italics indicate fastest lap)

Year	Team	1	2	3	4	5	6	7	8	9	10	11	12	13	14	15	16	17	18	19	20	21	Pos	Points
2019	MP Motorsport	NAV; 1; 9	NAV; 2; 6	NAV; 3 Ret	LEC; 1 Ret	LEC; 2; 6	LEC; 3; 17	ARA; 1; 8	ARA; 2; 7	ARA; 3; 8	CRT; 1; 6	CRT; 2; 5	CRT; 3; 5	JER; 1; 7	JER; 2; 5	JER; 3; 9	ALG; 1; 4	ALG; 2; 12	ALG; 3; 6	CAT; 1; 4	CAT; 2; 7	CAT; 3; 5	7th	105

=== Complete FIA Motorsport Games results ===
Year	Entrant	Cup	Qualifying	Quali Race	Main race
2019	Team Belgium	**Formula 4**	11th	7th	DNF

=== Complete TCR Europe Touring Car Series results ===
(key) (Races in bold indicate pole position) (Races in italics indicate fastest lap)

Year	Team	Car	1	2	3	4	5	6	7	8	9	10	11	12	13	14	DC	Points
2020	Comtoyou Racing	Audi RS 3 LMS TCR	LEC; 1 Ret	LEC; 2; 9	**ZOL**; **1**; 1^{1}	ZOL; 2; 6	MNZ; 1; 3^{8}	MNZ; 2; 5	CAT; 1; 10^{7}	CAT; 2; 6	SPA; 1 Ret	SPA; 2; 5	JAR; 1; 8^{7}	JAR; 2; 5			3rd	244
2021	Comtoyou Racing	Audi RS 3 LMS TCR	SVK; 1; 2^{3}	SVK; 2; 8	LEC; 1; 15	LEC; 2; 13	ZAN; 1; 6^{4}	ZAN; 2; 8	SPA; 1; 6^{6}	SPA; 2; 8	NÜR; 1; 14	NÜR; 2; 8	MNZ; 1; 8^{10}	MNZ; 2; 8	CAT; 1; 4^{4}	CAT; 2; 8	7th	242

=== Complete World Touring Car Cup results ===
(key) (Races in bold indicate pole position) (Races in italics indicate fastest lap)

Year	Team	Car	1	2	3	4	5	6	7	8	9	10	11	12	13	14	15	16	DC	Points
2020	Comtoyou Racing	Audi RS 3 LMS TCR	BEL; 1	BEL; 2	GER; 1	GER; 2	SVK; 1	SVK; 2	SVK; 3	HUN; 1	HUN; 2	HUN; 3	ESP; 1; 15	ESP; 2; 16	ESP; 3; 11	ARA; 1	ARA; 2	ARA; 3	NC†	0†

† As Baert was a guest driver, he was ineligible to score points.

=== Complete GT World Challenge Europe results ===
==== GT World Challenge Europe Endurance Cup ====
(key) (Races in bold indicate pole position) (Races in italics indicate fastest lap)

Year	Team	Car	Class	1	2	3	4	5	6	7	Pos.	Points
2022	Saintéloc Junior Team	Audi R8 LMS Evo II	Silver	IMO; 21	LEC; 20	SPA; 6H; Ret	SPA; 12H; Ret	SPA; 24H; Ret	HOC; 12	CAT; 16	5th	43
2023	Comtoyou Racing	Audi R8 LMS Evo II	Gold	MNZ; 7	LEC; 9	SPA; 6H; 34	SPA; 12H; 26	SPA; 24H; 21	NÜR; 21	CAT; 35	1st	104
2024	Comtoyou Racing	Aston Martin Vantage AMR GT3 Evo	Silver	LEC; 46	SPA; 6H; 60†	SPA; 12H; Ret	SPA; 24H; Ret	NÜR; 38	MNZ; 15	JED; 23	12th	47
2025	Comtoyou Racing	Aston Martin Vantage AMR GT3 Evo	Silver	LEC; 36	**MNZ**; Ret	SPA; 6H; 62	SPA; 12H; 54	SPA; 24H; Ret	NÜR; 26	BAR; 49	33rd	8
2026	Comtoyou Racing	Aston Martin Vantage AMR GT3 Evo	Pro-Am	LEC	MNZ	SPA; 6H; 43	SPA; 12H; 43	SPA; 24H; Ret			NC	0
2026	HRT Ford Racing	Ford Mustang GT3 Evo	Silver						NÜR; 13	ALG; 20	12th	35

==== GT World Challenge Europe Sprint Cup ====
(key) (Races in bold indicate pole position) (Races in italics indicate fastest lap)

Year	Team	Car	Class	1	2	3	4	5	6	7	8	9	10	Pos.	Points
2022	Saintéloc Junior Team	Audi R8 LMS Evo II	Silver	BRH; 1; 11	BRH; 2; 18	**MAG**; **1**; 6	MAG; 2; 16	ZAN; 1; 19	ZAN; 2; 11	MIS; 1; 7	MIS; 2; 11	VAL; 1; 12	VAL; 2; 9	5th	76
2023	Comtoyou Racing	Audi R8 LMS Evo II	Pro	BRH; 1; 8	BRH; 2; 20	MIS; 1; 4	MIS; 2; 15	HOC; 1; 2	HOC; 2; 16	VAL; 1; 6	VAL; 2; 10	ZAN; 1; 9	ZAN; 2 Ret	8th	27.5
2024	Comtoyou Racing	Aston Martin Vantage AMR GT3 Evo	Pro	BRH; 1 Ret	BRH; 2; 14	MIS; 1; 10	MIS; 2; 33†	HOC; 1; 17	HOC; 2; 6	MAG; 1; 15	MAG; 2 DNS	CAT; 1 Ret	CAT; 2; 2	11th	17
2026	Lionspeed GP	Porsche 911 GT3 R (992.2)	Silver	BRH; 1	BRH; 2	MIS; 1	MIS; 2	MAG; 1	MAG; 2	ZAN; 1; 27	ZAN; 2 Ret	CAT; 1; 25	**CAT**; **2**; 24	NC†	0†

=== Complete Deutsche Tourenwagen Masters results ===
(key) (Races in bold indicate pole position) (Races in italics indicate fastest lap)

Year	Team	Car	1	2	3	4	5	6	7	8	9	10	11	12	13	14	15	16	Pos	Points
2025	Comtoyou Racing	Aston Martin Vantage AMR GT3 Evo	OSC; 1 DSQ	OSC; 2 Ret	LAU; 1; 19	LAU; 2 Ret	ZAN; 1; 18	ZAN; 2; 20	NOR; 1 Ret	NOR; 2; 13	NÜR; 1; 17	NÜR; 2; 22	SAC; 1 Ret	SAC; 2; 17	RBR; 1; 21	RBR; 2; 19	HOC; 1; 21	HOC; 2; 19	24th	3
2026	Comtoyou Racing	Aston Martin Vantage AMR GT3 Evo	RBR; 1 Ret	RBR; 2; 17	ZAN; 1; 17	ZAN; 2; 17	LAU; 1; 16	LAU; 2; 17	NOR; 1; 15	NOR; 2; 15	OSC; 1 Ret	OSC; 2 Ret	NÜR; 1; 12	NÜR; 2; 15	SAC; 1; 16	SAC; 2 Ret	HOC; 1; 17	HOC; 2; 19	21st	8
