= 2022 TCR Australia Touring Car Series =

Motor racing competition

The 2022 TCR Australia Series (known for sponsorship reasons as the 2022 Supercheap Auto TCR Australia Series) was an Australian motor racing competition for TCR cars. It was the third running of the TCR Australia Series. Each round of the series was contested as part of the Motorsport Australia Championships.

The series was won by Tony D'Alberto driving a Honda Civic Type R TCR for Wall Racing.

== Calendar ==
The series was contested over seven rounds.

Round	Circuit	Location	Date
1	(Tasmania) Symmons Plains Raceway	Launceston, Tasmania	11–13 February
2	(Victoria (state)) Phillip Island Grand Prix Circuit	Phillip Island, Victoria	18–20 March
3	(New South Wales) Mount Panorama Circuit	Bathurst, New South Wales	15–17 April
4	(New South Wales) Sydney Motorsports Park	Eastern Creek, New South Wales	27–29 May
5	Queensland Raceway	Ipswich, Queensland	5–7 August
6	(Queensland) Sandown Raceway	Melbourne, Victoria	16–18 September
7	(New South Wales) Mount Panorama Circuit	Bathurst, New South Wales	11–13 November

== Teams and Drivers ==
The following teams and drivers contested the series:

Team	Car	No.	Drivers	Rounds	Ref.
(Australia) DashSport	Hyundai i30 N TCR	2	(Australia) Luke King	3–5	
(Australia) Melbourne Performance Centre	Audi RS 3 LMS TCR (2017)	22	(Australia) Iain McDougall	2, 4	
(Australia) Melbourne Performance Centre	Audi RS 3 LMS TCR (2017)	9	(Australia) Jay Hanson	3 (Note: Jay Hanson entered round 3 in an Audi RS3 LMS (2021), but after an accident in the opening practise session saw him switch to an Audi RS3 LMS (2017) for the rest of the weekend)	
(Australia) Melbourne Performance Centre	Audi RS 3 LMS TCR (2021)	9	(Australia) Jay Hanson	1–5	
(Australia) Garry Rogers Motorsport	Peugeot 308 TCR	8	(Australia) Dylan O'Keeffe	All	
(Australia) Garry Rogers Motorsport	Peugeot 308 TCR	33	(Australia) Jordan Cox	All	
(Australia) Peugeot Sport GRM Team Valvoline	Peugeot 308 TCR	18	(Australia) Aaron Cameron	All	
(France) GRM - Team Clairet Sport	Peugeot 308 TCR	20	(France) Teddy Clairet	7	
(Australia) Ashley Seward Motorsport	Alfa Romeo Giulietta Veloce TCR	10	(Australia) Michael Caruso	All	
(Australia) HMO Customer Racing	Hyundai i30 N TCR	11	(Australia) Nathan Morcom	All	
(Australia) HMO Customer Racing	Hyundai i30 N TCR	30	(Australia) Josh Buchan	1–6	
(Australia) HMO Customer Racing	Hyundai Elantra N TCR	30	(Australia) Josh Buchan	7	
(Australia) HMO Customer Racing	Hyundai i30 N TCR	130	(Australia) Bailey Sweeny	All	
(Australia) MPC - Purple Sector	Audi RS 3 LMS TCR (2017)	14	(Australia) Lachlan Mineeff	5–7	
(Australia) MPC - Purple Sector	Volkswagen Golf GTI TCR	14	(Australia) Lachlan Mineeff	1–4	
(Australia) MPC - Purple Sector	Volkswagen Golf GTI TCR	44	(Australia) Eddie Maguire	1	
(United Kingdom) Carl Cox Motorsport	Honda Civic Type R TCR (FK8)	15	(Australia) Michael Clemente	2–6	
(United Kingdom) Carl Cox Motorsport	Audi RS 3 LMS TCR (2017)	15	(Australia) Michael Clemente	7	
(Australia) Wall Racing	Honda Civic Type R TCR (FK8)	24	(New Zealand) Fabian Coulthard	1–2, 4	
(Australia) Wall Racing	Honda Civic Type R TCR (FK8)	24	(Australia) Tim Slade	3	
(Australia) Wall Racing	Honda Civic Type R TCR (FK8)	50	(Australia) Tony D'Alberto	All	
(Australia) Renault Sport GRM	Renault Mégane R.S TCR	34	(Australia) James Moffat	All	
(Australia) Renault Sport GRM Team Valvoline	Renault Mégane R.S TCR	41	(Australia) Kody Garland	All	
(Australia) Burson Auto Parts Racing	Peugeot 308 TCR	71	(Australia) Ben Bargwanna	All	
(Australia) Willmington Motorsport	Alfa Romeo Giulietta Veloce TCR	89	(Australia) Braydan Willmington	1–4	
(Australia) Forza Brakes Motorsport	Audi RS 3 LMS TCR (2017)	97	(Australia) Liam McAdam	1–3	
(Australia) Team Soutar Motorsport	Honda Civic Type R TCR (FK8)	110	(Australia) Zac Soutar	All	
(Australia) Tilton Racing	Hyundai i30 N TCR	333	(Australia) Brad Shiels	1–4	
(Australia) MPC - Audi Liqui Moly Racing Team	Audi RS 3 LMS TCR (2017)	999	(Australia) Will Brown	All	

== Summary ==
Round	Race	Circuit	Pole position	Fastest Lap	Winning Driver	Winning Team	Report
1	1	(Tasmania) Symmons Plains Raceway	(Australia) Nathan Morcom	(Australia) Jay Hanson	(Australia) Jay Hanson	AWC MPC Racing	
1	2	(Tasmania) Symmons Plains Raceway		(Australia) Josh Buchan	(Australia) Jordan Cox	Garry Rogers Motorsport	
1	3	(Tasmania) Symmons Plains Raceway		(Australia) Josh Buchan	(Australia) Zac Soutar	Team Soutar Motorsport	
2	1	(Victoria (state)) Phillip Island Grand Prix Circuit	(Australia) Jay Hanson	(Australia) Jay Hanson	(Australia) Jay Hanson	AWC MPC Racing	
2	2	(Victoria (state)) Phillip Island Grand Prix Circuit		(Australia) Will Brown	(New Zealand) Fabian Coulthard	Wall Racing	
2	3	(Victoria (state)) Phillip Island Grand Prix Circuit		(Australia) Will Brown	(New Zealand) Fabian Coulthard	Wall Racing	
3	1	(New South Wales) Mount Panorama Circuit	(Australia) Aaron Cameron	(Australia) Aaron Cameron	(Australia) Aaron Cameron	Peugeot Sport GRM Team Valvoline	
3	2	(New South Wales) Mount Panorama Circuit		(Australia) Bailey Sweeny	(Australia) Bailey Sweeny	HMO Customer Racing	
3	3	(New South Wales) Mount Panorama Circuit		(Australia) Bailey Sweeny	(Australia) Aaron Cameron	Peugeot Sport GRM Team Valvoline	
4	1	(New South Wales) Sydney Motorsport Park	(Australia) Josh Buchan	(Australia) Will Brown	(Australia) Josh Buchan	HMO Customer Racing	
4	2	(New South Wales) Sydney Motorsport Park		(Australia) Jay Hanson	(Australia) Jay Hanson	AWC MPC Racing	
4	3	(New South Wales) Sydney Motorsport Park		(Australia) Josh Buchan	(Australia) Nathan Morcom	HMO Customer Racing	
5	1	Queensland Raceway	(Australia) Tony D'Alberto	(Australia) Jay Hanson	(Australia) Tony D'Alberto	Honda Wall Racing	
5	2	Queensland Raceway		(Australia) Jay Hanson	(Australia) Jay Hanson	AWC MPC Racing	
5	3	Queensland Raceway		(Australia) Jay Hanson	(Australia) Tony D'Alberto	Honda Wall Racing	
6	1	(Victoria (state)) Sandown Raceway	(Australia) Jay Hanson	(Australia) Jay Hanson	(Australia) Aaron Cameron	Peugeot Sport GRM Team Valvoline	
6	2	(Victoria (state)) Sandown Raceway		(Australia) Jay Hanson	(Australia) Ben Bargwanna	Burson Auto Parts Racing	
6	3	(Victoria (state)) Sandown Raceway		(Australia) Michael Caruso	(Australia) Will Brown	MPC - Audi Liqui Moly Racing Team	
7	1	(New South Wales) Mount Panorama Circuit	(Australia) Jay Hanson	(Australia) Jay Hanson	(Australia) Bailey Sweeny	HMO Customer Racing	
7	2	(New South Wales) Mount Panorama Circuit		Race Cancelled (Note: Race 20 was cancelled due to heavy rain, no points was awarded)			
7	3	(New South Wales) Mount Panorama Circuit		(Australia) Bailey Sweeny	(Australia) Will Brown	Liqui Moly MPC Racing	

== Points system ==
- For Rounds 1 to 6, points were awarded 50, 46, 44, 42 etc for Races 1 & 3 and 40, 36, 34, 32 etc for Race 2.
- For Round 7, points were awarded 75, 69, 63, 57 etc for Races 1 & 3. Points would have been awarded 60, 54, 48, 42 etc for Race 2 however the race was cancelled.
- 2 additional points were awarded to the driver that recorded the fastest lap time in the final results of Q2 at each Round.

== Series standings ==
Pos.	Driver	No.	SYM (Tasmania)			PHI (Victoria (state))			BAT (New South Wales)			SMP (New South Wales)			QLD (Queensland)			SAN (Victoria (state))			BAT (New South Wales)			Pen.	Points
1	(Australia) Tony D'Alberto	50	8	3	2	7	3	5	7	6	9	8	4	14	**1**	5	1	4	4	10	11	C	11	0	711
2	(Australia) Will Brown	999	7	4	13	18	7	2	4	10	7	Ret	10	6	8	2	4	2	3	2	6	C	1	0	702
3	(Australia) Josh Buchan	30	2	5	**4**	Ret	19	14	8	3	4	**1**	11	2	14	9	8	5	8	4	9	C	3	0	667
4	(Australia) Jordan Cox	33	16	1	3	2	4	6	Ret	11	10	3	5	3	6	4	6	7	2	3	14	C	14	0	647
5	(Australia) Bailey Sweeny	130	15	2	Ret	11	16	9	9	1	2	11	18	18	4	11	5	8	16	6	1	C	2	0	610
6	(Australia) Zac Soutar	110	6	6	1	5	17	8	13	13	13	5	9	12	2	6	2	3	5	16	Ret	C	15	0	588
7	(Australia) Nathan Morcom	11	**3**	13	6	19	9	11	12	20	15	6	3	**1**	Ret	10	10	12	11	11	3	C	6	0	582
8	(Australia) Aaron Cameron	18	5	Ret	9	6	Ret	10	**1**	9	1	2	13	11	13	16	15	1	Ret	DNS	4	C	4	0	579
9	(Australia) Dylan O'Keeffe	8	9	7	Ret	3	5	4	3	5	3	4	7	5	11	Ret	11	Ret	7	7	2	C	16	0	577
10	(Australia) Jay Hanson	9	1	Ret	7	**1**	6	18	14	15	14	10	**1**	7	3	1	3	**Ret**	15	9	**Ret**	C	DNS	0	535
11	(Australia) Ben Bargwanna	71	13	10	Ret	10	**2**	3	2	7	6	19	19	8	Ret	12	12	10	1	5	5	C	Ret	0	535
12	(Australia) Michael Caruso	10	12	9	8	17	8	7	10	**4**	11	20	14	20	10	Ret	DNS	6	10	1	10	C	9	0	520
13	(Australia) Lachlan Mineeff	14	17	Ret	12	8	12	15	18	17	20	13	15	17	9	13	Ret	11	13	15	7	C	5	0	442
14	(Australia) James Moffat	34	4	Ret	DNS	12	18	13	5	2	**5**	14	8	Ret	Ret	7	16	9	Ret	9	16	C	Ret	0	402
15	(Australia) Michael Clemente	15				9	Ret	DNS	15	14	12	12	12	10	7	8	9	15	6	14	13	C	10	0	384
16	(Australia) Iain McDougall	3				13	11	16	20	19	18	12	Ret	15	12	15	13	14	9	13	15	C	12	0	344
17	(Australia) Luke King	2							16	12	19	7	2	4	5	3	7	Ret	12	Ret	17	C	8	0	343
18	(Australia) Brad Shiels	333	10	8	5	14	10	12	11	8	8	9	6	19										0	317
19	(Australia) Kody Garland	41	DNS	DNS	DNS	16	14	Ret	17	16	21	18	Ret	9	Ret	14	14	13	14	12	12	C	13	0	294
20	(Australia) Fabian Coulthard	24	11	14	14	4	1	**1**				17	17	13										0	255
21	(Australia) Braydan Willmington	89	18	11	11	15	13	19	19	18	16	15	16	16										0	234
22	(Australia) Liam McAdam	97	14	15	10	Ret	15	17																0	103
23	(France) Teddy Clairet	20																			8	C	7	0	84
24	(Australia) Tim Slade	24							6	Ret	17													0	59
25	(Australia) Eddie Maguire	44	19	**12**	15																			0	58

Key
Colour	Result
Gold	Winner
Silver	Second place
Bronze	Third place
Green	Other points position
Blue	Other classified position
Blue	Not classified, finished (NC)
Purple	Not classified, retired (Ret)
Red	Did not qualify (DNQ)
Red	Did not pre-qualify (DNPQ)
Black	Disqualified (DSQ)
White	Did not start (DNS)
White	Race cancelled (C)
Blank	Did not practice (DNP)
Blank	Excluded (EX)
Blank	Did not arrive (DNA)
Blank	Withdrawn (WD)
Blank	Did not enter (cell empty)
Text formatting	Meaning
**Bold**	Pole position
Italics	Fastest lap
