= 2020 TCR Europe Touring Car Series =

European motorsport championship

The 2020 TCR Europe Touring Car Series is the fifth season of TCR Europe Touring Car Series. The season will begin at the Circuit de Spa-Francorchamps in April and May and will end at the Circuit de Barcelona-Catalunya in October.

Josh Files is the defending drivers' champion, while Target Competition is the defending teams' champion.

== Calendar ==
The calendar was announced on 22 May 2020 with 6 rounds scheduled.

Rnd.		Circuit/Location	Date	Supporting
1	1	Circuit Paul Ricard, Le Castellet, France	21–23 August	International GT Open; F4 Spanish Championship
1	2	Circuit Paul Ricard, Le Castellet, France	21–23 August	International GT Open; F4 Spanish Championship
2	3	Circuit Zolder, Heusden-Zolder, Belgium	11–13 September	FIA European Truck Racing Championship; World Touring Car Cup
2	4	Circuit Zolder, Heusden-Zolder, Belgium	11–13 September	FIA European Truck Racing Championship; World Touring Car Cup
3	5	Autodromo Nazionale Monza, Monza, Italy	25–27 September	International GT Open
3	6	Autodromo Nazionale Monza, Monza, Italy	25–27 September	International GT Open
4	7	Circuit de Barcelona-Catalunya, Montmeló, Spain	9–11 October	GT World Challenge Europe Sprint Cup
4	8	Circuit de Barcelona-Catalunya, Montmeló, Spain	9–11 October	GT World Challenge Europe Sprint Cup
5	9	Circuit de Spa-Francorchamps, Stavelot, Belgium	22–24 October	Spa 24 Hours; GT4 European Series
5	10	Circuit de Spa-Francorchamps, Stavelot, Belgium	22–24 October	Spa 24 Hours; GT4 European Series
6	11	Circuito del Jarama, San Sebastián de los Reyes, Spain	6–8 November	F4 Spanish Championship
6	12	Circuito del Jarama, San Sebastián de los Reyes, Spain	6–8 November	F4 Spanish Championship

=== Calendar changes ===
- After being omitted from the 2019 calendar Circuit Paul Ricard will return to the series, acting as the season opener in the revised calendar.
- The Circuit Zolder will make its first appearance in the series.
- With the addition of Circuit Zolder and Circuit Paul Ricard, the rounds held at the Hungaroring and Hockenheimring were removed from the schedule.

== Teams and drivers ==
Team	Car	No.	Drivers	Class	Rounds	Ref.
(France) JSB Compétition	Peugeot 308 TCR	04	(France) Florian Briché	BNL R	1–2, 4	
(France) JSB Compétition	Peugeot 308 TCR	06	(France) Jean Laurent Navarro	BNL Y	1–4	
(France) JSB Compétition	Peugeot 308 TCR	24	(France) Julien Briché	BNL	All	
(Germany) Profi-Car Team Halder	Honda Civic Type R TCR (FK8)	7	(Germany) Mike Halder		All	
(Germany) Profi-Car Team Halder	Honda Civic Type R TCR (FK8)	53	(Germany) Michelle Halder		All	
(Belgium) Comtoyou Racing	Audi RS 3 LMS TCR	8	(Belgium) Nicolas Baert	BNL R	All	
(Belgium) Comtoyou Racing	Audi RS 3 LMS TCR	25	(Morocco) Sami Taoufik	BNL R	All	
(Belgium) Comtoyou Racing	Audi RS 3 LMS TCR	250	(Morocco) Mehdi Bennani	BNL	All	
(North Macedonia) PSS Racing Team	Honda Civic Type R TCR (FK8)	10	(North Macedonia) Viktor Davidovski	Y	3, 6	
(North Macedonia) PSS Racing Team	Honda Civic Type R TCR (FK8)	29	(Argentina) Néstor Girolami		1	
(North Macedonia) PSS Racing Team	Honda Civic Type R TCR (FK8)	72	(Argentina) Franco Girolami		6	
(Spain) SMC Junior Motorsport	Peugeot 308 TCR	13	(Spain) Enrique Hernando		6	
(Spain) SMC Junior Motorsport	Peugeot 308 TCR	199	(Spain) Fernando Navarrete		6	
(Italy) Tecnodom Sport	Audi RS 3 LMS TCR	15	(Italy) Kevin Giacon		3	
(Italy) Tecnodom Sport	Fiat Tipo TCR	64	(Italy) Luca Rangoni	G	3	
(Spain) Volcano Motorsport	CUPRA León TCR	16	(Russia) Evgeni Leonov	R	1, 3–6	
(Spain) Volcano Motorsport	CUPRA León TCR	96	(Spain) Mikel Azcona		5–6	
(Slovakia) Brutal Fish Racing Team	Honda Civic Type R TCR (FK8)	17	(Slovakia) Martin Ryba	Y	All	
(Slovakia) Brutal Fish Racing Team	Honda Civic Type R TCR (FK8)	74	(Spain) Pepe Oriola		All	
(Slovakia) Brutal Fish Racing Team	Honda Civic Type R TCR (FK8)	123	(United Kingdom) Daniel Lloyd		All	
(Italy) Élite Motorsport	CUPRA León Competición TCR	18	(Italy) Nicola Baldan		5	
(Italy) Target Competition	Hyundai i30 N TCR	19	(Sweden) Andreas Bäckman		All	
(Italy) Target Competition	Hyundai i30 N TCR	26	(Sweden) Jessica Bäckman		All	
(Italy) Target Competition	Hyundai i30 N TCR	27	(France) John Filippi	BNL	All	
(Italy) Target Competition	Hyundai i30 N TCR	33	(Argentina) José Manuel Sapag	R	4–6	
(France) Team Clairet Sport	Peugeot 308 TCR	20	(France) Teddy Clairet	BNL	All	
(France) Team Clairet Sport	Peugeot 308 TCR	21	(France) Jimmy Clairet	BNL	All	
(France) Team Clairet Sport	Peugeot 308 TCR	66	(France) Gilles Colombani	BNL Y	1–4	
(France) Team Clairet Sport	Peugeot 308 TCR	81	(France) Stéphane Ventaja	BNL Y	1–5	
(Belgium) Boutsen Ginion Racing	Honda Civic Type R TCR (FK8)	31	(Netherlands) Tom Coronel	BNL	1, 5–6	
(United Kingdom) Essex & Kent Motorsport	Hyundai i30 N TCR	38	(United Kingdom) Lewis Kent	R	1	
(Italy) PMA Motorsport	Hyundai i30 N TCR	44	(Italy) Felice Jelmini		3	
(Italy) BRC Racing Team	Hyundai i30 N TCR	70	(Slovakia) Maťo Homola		All	
(Italy) BRC Racing Team	Hyundai i30 N TCR	99	(Hungary) Dániel Nagy		All	

Icon	Class
BNL	Eligible for TCR BeNeLux Touring Car Championship
R	Eligible for Yokohama Rookie Trophy
Y	Eligible for Yokohama Diamond Trophy
G	Guest drivers ineligible to score points

=== Team and driver changes ===
- Élite Motorsport will enter two Audi RS 3 LMS TCR cars, for Jacopo Guidetti and another yet to be confirmed driver.
- W Racing Team, which fielded an Audi RS 3 LMS TCR for Santiago Urrutia and a Volkswagen Golf GTI TCR for Maxime Potty in the 2019 season, will not return to the series along with ending their activities in the World Touring Car Cup.
- Brutal Fish Racing will enter the season with a trio of Honda Civic Type R TCR (FK8)s. Pepe Oriola will drive the third car.
- Nicolas Baert, Mehdi Bennani and Sami Taoufik will drive a trio of Comtoyou Racing-entered Audi RS 3 LMS TCRs. Gilles Magnus was also scheduled to compete for Comtoyou Racing, but withdrew prior to the start of the season.
- Argentinean driver José Manuel Sapag will drive for Target Competition.
- Vuković Motorsport will enter two Renault Mégane R.S TCR cars, for Jack Young and another yet to be confirmed driver.
- BRC Racing Team will enter two Hyundai i30 N TCR cars, for Mat'o Homola who moves from Target Competition and Dániel Nagy who moves from M1RA.
- Volcano Motorsport will enter a CUPRA León TCR in selected rounds, for Evgeni Leonov.
- Florian Briché will debut for JSB Compétition in a Peugeot 308 TCR.
- Néstor Girolami will drive in the opening round for PSS Racing Team, replacing Davidovski due to travel bans.
- Tecnodom Sport will make its series debut entering an Audi RS 3 LMS TCR for Kevin Giacon and the Fiat Tipo TCR for Luca Rangoni who will be running as a guest entry as it is not yet a homologated car.
- Felice Jemini will debut for PMA Motorsport in a Hyundai i30 N TCR.

== Rule changes ==
=== Sporting changes ===
The race format is set to be changed for 2020 from 23 minutes + 1 lap to fixed length at 55 kilometers with the first two laps under safety car added to the total race distance similar to the rules set by the World Touring Car Cup. The change was made due to some of the races were mostly spent under safety car. Along with the fixed race distance, a maximum of 30 full-season entries would be allowed.

== Results and standings ==
=== Season summary ===
Rnd.		Circuit/Location	Pole position	Fastest lap	Winning driver	Winning team	TCR BeNeLux Winner	Yokohama Trophy Winner
1	1	(France) Circuit Paul Ricard	(France) John Filippi	(France) John Filippi	(United Kingdom) Daniel Lloyd	(Slovakia) Brutal Fish Racing Team	(Morocco) Mehdi Bennani	(Morocco) Sami Taoufik
1	2	(France) Circuit Paul Ricard		(France) John Filippi	(Germany) Mike Halder	(Germany) Profi-Car Team Halder	(France) Teddy Clairet	(Belgium) Nicolas Baert
2	3	(Belgium) Circuit Zolder	(Belgium) Nicolas Baert	(Belgium) Nicolas Baert	(Belgium) Nicolas Baert	(Belgium) Comtoyou Racing	(Belgium) Nicolas Baert	(Belgium) Nicolas Baert
2	4	(Belgium) Circuit Zolder		(Belgium) Nicolas Baert	(Germany) Michelle Halder	(Germany) Profi-Car Team Halder	(Morocco) Mehdi Bennani	(Belgium) Nicolas Baert
3	5	(Italy) Autodromo Nazionale Monza	(Morocco) Mehdi Bennani	(France) Julien Briché	(France) Julien Briché	(France) JSB Compétition	(France) Julien Briché	(Belgium) Nicolas Baert
3	6	(Italy) Autodromo Nazionale Monza		(France) Julien Briché	(Spain) Pepe Oriola	(Slovakia) Brutal Fish Racing Team	(France) Julien Briché	(Belgium) Nicolas Baert
4	7	(Spain) Circuit de Barcelona-Catalunya	(Slovakia) Maťo Homola	(Morocco) Sami Taoufik	(Germany) Mike Halder	(Germany) Profi-Car Team Halder	(Morocco) Sami Taoufik	(Morocco) Sami Taoufik
4	8	(Spain) Circuit de Barcelona-Catalunya		(Morocco) Sami Taoufik	(Sweden) Andreas Bäckman	(Italy) Target Competition	(Morocco) Sami Taoufik	(Morocco) Sami Taoufik
5	9	(Belgium) Circuit de Spa-Francorchamps	(Morocco) Mehdi Bennani	(Spain) Mikel Azcona	(Spain) Mikel Azcona	(Spain) Volcano Motorsport	(Netherlands) Tom Coronel	(Morocco) Sami Taoufik
5	10	(Belgium) Circuit de Spa-Francorchamps		(Spain) Mikel Azcona	(Spain) Mikel Azcona	(Spain) Volcano Motorsport	(Netherlands) Tom Coronel	(Belgium) Nicolas Baert
6	11	(Spain) Circuito del Jarama	(Spain) Mikel Azcona	(Spain) Mikel Azcona	(Spain) Mikel Azcona	(Spain) Volcano Motorsport	Not awarded	(Belgium) Nicolas Baert
6	12	(Spain) Circuito del Jarama		(Spain) Mikel Azcona	(France) John Filippi	(Italy) Target Competition	Not awarded	(Belgium) Nicolas Baert

=== TCR Europe standings ===
==== Drivers' standings ====
Scoring system

Position	**1st**	**2nd**	**3rd**	**4th**	**5th**	**6th**	**7th**	**8th**	**9th**	**10th**	**11th**	**12th**	**13th**	**14th**	**15th**
Qualifying	10	9	8	7	6	5	4	3	2	1	—N/a				
Race	40	35	30	27	24	21	18	15	13	11	9	7	5	3	1

Pos.	Driver	LEC (France)		ZOL (Belgium)		MNZ (Italy)		BAR (Spain)		SPA (Belgium)		JAR (Spain)		Pts.
1	(Morocco) Mehdi Bennani	2^{2}	5	Ret^{3}	5	**Ret**^{1}	8	5^{5}	3	**6**^{1}	16	4^{4}	2	285
2	(France) John Filippi	**3**^{1}	7	12	9	5^{10}	9	8^{8}	10	5^{3}	3	11^{10}	1	257
3	(Belgium) Nicolas Baert	Ret	9	**1**^{1}	6	3^{8}	5	10^{7}	6	Ret	5	8^{7}	5	244
4	(Germany) Mike Halder	10^{10}	1	2^{5}	4	18†^{9}	Ret	1^{2}	4	3^{8}	10	Ret	Ret	242
5	(United Kingdom) Daniel Lloyd	1^{3}	6	5^{10}	2	2^{2}	Ret	16	16	8^{5}	Ret	9	12	214
6	(Sweden) Andreas Bäckman	7^{8}	4	Ret^{8}	Ret	WD	WD	7^{10}	1	4^{4}	7	6^{6}	6	209
7	(Slovakia) Maťo Homola	8	12	3^{2}	8	17†	3	**4**^{1}	20	15^{10}	12	3^{3}	11	204
8	(Hungary) Dániel Nagy	11	10	4^{6}	3	6	13	6^{3}	5	17	6	7^{9}	20†	202
9	(France) Teddy Clairet	4^{6}	3	8	18	Ret	6	19	11	14	4	2^{2}	8	200
10	(France) Julien Briché	14	14	15†^{7}	Ret	1^{4}	2	9	21	11	17	5^{5}	3	175
11	(Spain) Mikel Azcona									1	1	**1**^{1}	4	157
12	(Morocco) Sami Taoufik	9^{9}	18	11^{4}	11	16	12	3^{6}	2	7^{6}	13	10	Ret	157
13	(Spain) Pepe Oriola	20	11	10	7	Ret^{5}	1	2^{4}	13	10^{9}	11	Ret	DNS	153
14	(France) Jimmy Clairet	6^{5}	23	9	12	Ret^{3}	4	11	9	12	18	12	10	129
15	(Germany) Michelle Halder	12	13	7^{9}	1	8	11	21	7	16	Ret	17	15	115
16	(Netherlands) Tom Coronel	Ret	Ret							2^{2}	2	14	7	100
17	(Argentina) Néstor Girolami	5^{4}	2											66
18	(Sweden) Jessica Bäckman	21^{7}	8	Ret	10	7	14	15^{9}	18	Ret	14	Ret^{8}	19	60
19	(Italy) Felice Jelmini					4	7							45
20	(Argentina) José Manuel Sapag							12	8	13^{7}	Ret	18	13	36
21	(Slovakia) Martin Ryba	Ret	19	6	16	15	10	Ret	DNS	19	Ret	Ret	18	35
22	(France) Stéphane Ventaja	19	15	13	14	10	15	13	12	20	15			34
23	(Italy) Nicola Baldan									9	8			28
24	(North Macedonia) Viktor Davidovski					9	20					16	9	26
25	(Russia) Evgeni Leonov	15	16			12	18	14	19	18	9	19	17	24
26	(France) Gilles Colombani	17	21	14	15	11	Ret	18	17					13
27	(France) Florian Briché	13	17	Ret	17			20	14					8
28	(France) Jean-Laurent Navarro	16	22	Ret	13	DNS	16	17	15					6
29	(Italy) Kevin Giacon					14	19							5
30	(Spain) Enrique Hernando											13	Ret	5
31	(Argentina) Franco Girolami											Ret	14	3
32	(Spain) Fernando Navarrete											15	16	1
33	(United Kingdom) Lewis Kent	18	20											0
Guest Drivers ineligible to score points
–	(Italy) Luca Rangoni					13	17							–
Pos.	Driver	LEC (France)		ZOL (Belgium)		MNZ (Italy)		BAR (Spain)		SPA (Belgium)		JAR (Spain)		Pts.

Colour	Result
Gold	Winner
Silver	Second place
Bronze	Third place
Green	Points classification
Blue	Non-points classification
Blue	Non-classified finish (NC)
Purple	Retired, not classified (Ret)
Red	Did not qualify (DNQ)
Red	Did not pre-qualify (DNPQ)
Black	Disqualified (DSQ)
White	Did not start (DNS)
White	Withdrew (WD)
White	Race cancelled (C)
Blank	Did not practice (DNP)
Blank	Did not arrive (DNA)
Blank	Excluded (EX)

**Bold** – Pole
Italics – Fastest Lap

† – Drivers did not finish the race, but were classified as they completed over 75% of the race distance.

==== Teams' standings ====
Pos.	Team	LEC (France)			ZOL (Belgium)			MNZ (Italy)			BAR (Spain)			SPA (Belgium)			JAR (Spain)			Pts.
Pos.	Team	QP	R1	R2	QP	R1	R2	QP	R1	R2	QP	R1	R2	QP	R1	R2	QP	R1	R2	Pts.
1	(Belgium) Comtoyou Racing	11	2	5	18	**1**	5	13	3	5	11	3	2	15	**6**	5	11	4	2	620
1	(Belgium) Comtoyou Racing	11	9	9	18	11	6	13	**16**	8	11	5	3	15	7	13	11	8	5	620
2	(Italy) Target Competition	14	**3**	4	4	12	9	1	5	9	7	7	1	15	4	3	8	6	1	515
2	(Italy) Target Competition	14	7	7	4	Ret	10	1	7	14	7	8	10	15	5	14	8	11	6	515
3	(Italy) BRC Racing Team	0	8	10	15	3	3	5	6	3	18	**4**	5	3	15	6	10	3	11	423
3	(Italy) BRC Racing Team	0	11	12	15	4	8	5	17†	13	18	6	20	3	17	12	10	7	20†	423
4	(Slovakia) Brutal Fish Racing Team	8	1	6	3	5	2	15	2	1	7	2	13	9	8	11	0	9	12	412
4	(Slovakia) Brutal Fish Racing Team	8	20	11	3	6	7	15	15	10	7	16	16	9	10	Ret	0	Ret	18	412
5	(France) Team Clairet Sport	11	4	3	0	8	12	12	10	4	2	11	9	0	12	4	9	2	8	388
5	(France) Team Clairet Sport	11	6	15	0	9	14	12	11	6	2	13	11	0	14	15	9	12	10	388
6	(Germany) Profi-Car Team Halder	1	10	1	10	2	1	2	8	11	9	1	4	4	3	10	0	17	15	371
6	(Germany) Profi-Car Team Halder	1	12	13	10	7	4	2	18†	Ret	9	21	7	4	16	Ret	0	Ret	Ret	371
7	(France) JSB Compétition	0	13	14	5	15†	13	7	1	2	0	9	14	0	11	17	6	5	3	222
7	(France) JSB Compétition	0	14	17	5	Ret	17	7	DNS	16	0	17	15	0			6			222
8	(Spain) Volcano Motorsport	0	15	16				0	12	18	1	14	19	0	1	1	10	**1**	4	192
8	(Spain) Volcano Motorsport	0						0			1			0	18	9	10	19	17	192
9	(Belgium) Boutsen Ginion Racing	0	Ret	Ret										9	2	2	0	14	7	102
10	(North Macedonia) PSS Racing Team	7	5	2				0	9	20							1	16	9	98
10	(North Macedonia) PSS Racing Team	7						0									1	Ret	14	98
11	(Italy) PMA Motorsport							0	4	7										45
12	(Italy) Élite Motorsport													0	9	8				28
13	(Spain) SMC Junior Motorsport																0	13	Ret	11
13	(Spain) SMC Junior Motorsport																0	15	16	11
14	(Italy) Tecnodom Sport							0	14	19										5
14	(Italy) Tecnodom Sport							0	13	17										5
15	(United Kingdom) Essex & Kent Motorsport	0	18	20																0
Pos.	Team	LEC (France)			ZOL (Belgium)			MNZ (Italy)			BAR (Spain)			SPA (Belgium)			JAR (Spain)			Pts.

† – Drivers did not finish the race, but were classified as they completed over 75% of the race distance.

==== TCR BeNeLux Drivers' standings ====
Pos.	Driver	LEC (France)		ZOL (Belgium)		MNZ (Italy)		BAR (Spain)		SPA (Belgium)		JAR (Spain)		Pts.
1	(Belgium) Nicolas Baert	Ret	9	**1**^{1}	6	3^{8}	5	10^{7}	6	Ret	5	8^{7}	5	254
2	(Morocco) Mehdi Bennani	2^{2}	5	Ret^{3}	5	**Ret**^{1}	8	5^{5}	3	**6**^{1}	16	4^{4}	2	246
3	(Morocco) Sami Taoufik	9^{9}	18	11^{4}	11	16	12	3^{6}	2	7^{6}	13	10	Ret	197
4	(France) Stéphane Ventaja	19	15	13	14	10	15	13	12	20	15			121
5	(Russia) Evgeni Leonov	15	16			12	18	14	19	18	9	19	17	113
6	(Slovakia) Martin Ryba	Ret	19	6	16	15	10	Ret	DNS	19	Ret	Ret	18	80
7	(Argentina) José Manuel Sapag							12	8	13^{7}	Ret	18	13	75
8	(France) Gilles Colombani	17	21	14	15	11	Ret	18	17					58
9	(France) Jean-Laurent Navarro	16	22	Ret	13	DNS	16	17	15					55
10	(North Macedonia) Viktor Davidovski					9	20					16	9	48
11	(France) Florian Briché	13	17	Ret	17			20	14					46
12	(Spain) Fernando Navarrete											15	16	22
13	(Spain) Enrique Hernando											13	Ret	15
14	(Argentina) Franco Girolami											Ret	14	14
15	(United Kingdom) Lewis Kent	18	20											14
Pos.	Driver	LEC (France)		ZOL (Belgium)		MNZ (Italy)		BAR (Spain)		SPA (Belgium)		JAR (Spain)		Pts.

Colour	Result
Gold	Winner
Silver	Second place
Bronze	Third place
Green	Points classification
Blue	Non-points classification
Blue	Non-classified finish (NC)
Purple	Retired, not classified (Ret)
Red	Did not qualify (DNQ)
Red	Did not pre-qualify (DNPQ)
Black	Disqualified (DSQ)
White	Did not start (DNS)
White	Withdrew (WD)
White	Race cancelled (C)
Blank	Did not practice (DNP)
Blank	Did not arrive (DNA)
Blank	Excluded (EX)

**Bold** – Pole
Italics – Fastest Lap

† – Drivers did not finish the race, but were classified as they completed over 75% of the race distance.
