= Teddy Clairet =

French racing driver (born 1993)

- Nationality: (France) French
- Born: 9 October 1993 (age 33) Clamart, France
- Relatives: Jimmy Clairet (brother)
- Categorisation: FIA Silver

Championship titles
- 2022 2018 2014: Championnat de France FFSA Tourisme – TC; Peugeot 308 Racing Cup; Peugeot 208 Racing Cup France

Teddy Clairet (born 9 October 1993) is a French racing driver who last competed in the TCR World Tour for Team Clairet Sport.

== Personal life ==
Clairet is the younger brother of fellow racing driver Jimmy Clairet.

== Career ==
Clairet made his car racing debut in 2013, racing in the Peugeot 208 Racing Cup France. After winning the title the following year, Clairet then spent two years in Clio Cup France before competing in the Peugeot 308 Racing Cup for two years, coming runner-up in 2017 and winning the title in 2018.

In 2019, Clairet joined the TCR Europe grid alongside his brother Jimmy with the family-run Team Clairet Sport. In his maiden season in the series, Clairet took a best result of fourth in the season-ending round at Monza and finished the season 14th in points. During 2019, Clairet also contested the TCR Spa 500 for DG Sport Compétition, finishing second overall and setting the fastest lap in the first edition of the event. Clairet remained with the family team for his sophomore season of TCR Europe in 2020. Taking his maiden series podium in the season-opening round at Le Castellet, Clairet then had to wait until the season-ending round at Jarama to score his second and final podium of the season to end the year ninth in points.

Remaining in TCR Europe for a third consecutive season, Clairet scored his maiden series win in the second round of the season at Le Castellet, before scoring three more podiums in the following five rounds en route to an eighth-place points finish. Switching to TC France for 2022, Clairet competed in the first four rounds, winning all 12 races and clinching the title with two rounds to spare. That year, Clairet also made a one-off appearance in the TCR Australia Touring Car Series and represented France in the FIA Motorsport Games Touring Car Cup.

In 2023, Clairet joined AVR Avvatar to compete in the French GT4 Championship alongside his brother Jimmy. Racing in the Silver Cup, Clairet took a lone class win at Nogaro and scored four more podiums to end the year fifth in points. In late 2023, Clairet also made a brief return to TCR competition, racing in the Bathurst round of the TCR Australia Touring Car Series, held in conjunction with the TCR World Tour. Having spent most of 2024 coaching young drivers, Clairet returned to racing for the TCR Italy finale at Monza, winning race two in his maiden round in the series.

Returning to the family team for 2025, Clairet returned to TCR Europe on a full-time basis for the first time in four years. Finishing third and fourth on his series return at Algarve, Clairet then finished fifth in race one at Spa, before taking his maiden win of the season in race two. After winning at Misano, Clairet then finished no higher than seventh at the Red Bull Ring, before finishing fourth and second in the finale at Barcelona to end the year level on points with Jenson Brickley but losing out on the title on countback.

The following year, Clairet joined ALM Motorsport to race in select rounds of the TCR World Tour. During 2026, Clairet also made a one-off cameo in TCR Europe for Vannin Motorsport at Monza.

== Racing record ==
=== Racing career summary ===
Season	Series	Team	Races	Wins	Poles	F/Laps	Podiums	Points	Position
2013	Peugeot 208 Racing Cup France	Team Clairet Sport	20	0	0	0	0	89	8th
2014	Peugeot 208 Racing Cup France	Team Clairet Sport							**1st**
2015	Renault Clio Cup France	Team Clairet Sport	11	0	0	1	2	247	5th
2016	Renault Clio Cup France	Team Clairet Sport	12	0	1	0	4	311	**3rd**
2016	European Touring Car Cup – Super 2000	Sébastien Loeb Racing	2	0	0	0	1	11	13th
2016	World Touring Car Championship – Super 2000	Sébastien Loeb Racing	2	0	0	0	0	0	NC
2017	Dubai 24 Hour – A2	TEAM CLIO CUP FRANCE	0	0	0	0	0	—N/a	DNS
2017	24H Series – A2	TEAM CLIO CUP FRANCE	0	0	0	0	0	0	NC
2017	Peugeot 308 Racing Cup	Pussier Automobiles by Clairet Sport	12	0	3	0	9	144	**2nd**
2017–18	Andros Trophy – Elite Pro	Pussier Automobiles by Clairet Sport	12	0	1	0	0	219	12th
2018	Peugeot 308 Racing Cup	Pussier Automobiles by Clairet Sport	12	6	7	6	11	203	**1st**
2018–19	Andros Trophy – Elite Pro	Pussier Automobiles by Clairet Sport	4	0	0	0	0	78	18th
2019	TCR Europe Touring Car Series	Team Clairet Sport	13	0	0	0	0	116	14th
2019	TCR Ibérico Touring Car Series	Team Clairet Sport	2	0	0	0	0	6	22nd
2019	TCR Spa 500	DG Sport Compétition	1	0	0	0	1	—N/a	**2nd**
2020	TCR Europe Touring Car Series	Team Clairet Sport	12	0	0	0	2	200	9th
2021	TCR Europe Touring Car Series	Team Clairet Sport	14	1	1	0	4	220	8th
2022	Championnat de France FFSA Tourisme – TC	Team Clairet Sport	12	12	8	11	12	300	**1st**
2022	TCR Australia Touring Car Series	GRM – Team Clairet Sport	2	0	0	0	0	84	23rd
2022	FIA Motorsport Games Touring Car Cup	Team France	1	0	0	0	0	—N/a	DNF
2023	Championnat de France GT4 – Silver	AVR Avvatar	12	1	0	0	5	139	5th
2023	TCR World Tour	GRM – Hangcha Forklifts	3	0	0	0	0	1	60th
2023	TCR Australia Touring Car Series	GRM – Hangcha Forklifts	3	0	0	0	0	0	NC
2024	TCR Spain	Team Clairet Sport	2	0	0	0	1	56	14th
2024	TCR Italy Touring Car Championship	Team Clairet Sport	2	1	0	1	2	87	NC
2025	TCR Europe Touring Car Series	Team Clairet Sport	12	2	0	1	4	208	**2nd**
2025	TC France Series	Stellantis Customer Racing	2	0	0	0	0	0	NC
2026	TCR World Tour	ALM Motorsport	2	0	0	0	0	51	14th*
2026	TCR World Tour	Team Clairet Sport	2	1	0	1	1	51	14th*
2026	TCR Europe Touring Car Series	Vannin Motorsport	2	0	0	0	0	0	36th

=== Complete TCR Europe Touring Car Series results ===
(key) (Races in bold indicate pole position) (Races in italics indicate fastest lap)

Year	Team	Car	1	2	3	4	5	6	7	8	9	10	11	12	13	14	DC	Points
2019	Team Clairet Sport	Peugeot 308 TCR	HUN; 1; 12	HUN; 2; 13	HOC; 1; 9	HOC; 2; 14	SPA; 1 DNS	SPA; 2; 6	RBR; 1 Ret	RBR; 2; 15	OSC; 1; 12	OSC; 2; 17	CAT; 1; 20	CAT; 2; 7	MNZ; 1; 9^{5}	MNZ; 2; 4	14th	116
2020	Team Clairet Sport	Peugeot 308 TCR	LEC; 1; 4^{6}	LEC; 2; 3	ZOL; 1; 8	ZOL; 2; 18	MNZ; 1 Ret	MNZ; 2; 6	CAT; 1; 19	CAT; 2; 11	SPA; 1; 14	SPA; 2; 4	JAR; 1; 2^{2}	JAR; 2; 8			9th	200
2021	Team Clairet Sport	Peugeot 308 TCR	SVK; 1 Ret	SVK; 2; 14	**LEC**; **1**; 1^{1}	LEC; 2 Ret	ZAN; 1; 16	ZAN; 2; 13	SPA; 1; 7^{8}	SPA; 2; 3	NÜR; 1; 4^{4}	NÜR; 2; 7	MNZ; 1 Ret	MNZ; 2; 9	CAT; 1; 2^{3}	CAT; 2; 3	8th	220
2025	Team Clairet Sport	Audi RS 3 LMS TCR (2021)	PRT; 1; 3^{6}	PRT; 2; 4	SPA; 1; 5	SPA; 2; 1	HOC; 1 Ret	HOC; 2; 6	MIS; 1; 10	MIS; 2; 1	RBR; 1; 12	RBR; 2; 7	CAT; 1; 4	CAT; 2; 2			2nd	208
2026	Vannin Motorsport	Audi RS 3 LMS TCR (2021)	MUG; 1	MUG; 2	SPA; 1	SPA; 2	LEC; 1	LEC; 2	HUN; 1	HUN; 2	MNZ; 1 Ret	MNZ; 2; 21	CAT; 1	CAT; 2			36th	0

^{†} Driver did not finish, but was classified as he completed over 75% of the race distance.

=== Complete TCR World Tour results ===
(key) (Races in bold indicate pole position) (Races in italics indicate fastest lap)

Year	Team	Car	1	2	3	4	5	6	7	8	9	10	11	12	13	14	15	16	17	18	19	20	DC	Points
2023	GRM – Hangcha Forklifts	Peugeot 308 TCR	ALG; 1	ALG; 2	SPA; 1	SPA; 2	VAL; 1	VAL; 2	HUN; 1	HUN; 2	ELP; 1	ELP; 2	VIL; 1	VIL; 2	SYD; 1	SYD; 2	SYD; 3	BAT; 1; 15	BAT; 2 DSQ	BAT; 3 Ret	MAC; 1	MAC; 2	60th	1
2026	ALM Motorsport	Honda Civic Type R TCR	MIS; 1; 13	MIS; 2; 16	CRT; 1	CRT; 2	CRT; 3																14th*	51
2026	Team Clairet Sport	Cupra León VZ TCR						LEC; 1; 5	LEC; 2; 1	CVR; 1	CVR; 2	INJ; 1	INJ; 2	INJ; 3	CHE; 1	CHE; 2	CHE; 3	ZHZ; 1	ZHZ; 2	ZHZ; 3	MAC; 1	MAC; 2	14th*	51

^{*} Season still in progress.
