= Jimmy Clairet =

French racing driver

- Nationality: (France) French
- Born: 20 December 1990 (age 35) Paris, Île-de-France, France
- Relatives: Teddy Clairet (brother)

TCR Europe Touring Car Series career
- Debut season: 2019
- Current team: Team Clairet Sport
- Categorisation: FIA Silver
- Car number: 21
- Former teams: Gruppo Baldan by Comtoyou Racing
- Starts: 56
- Wins: 3
- Poles: 1
- Fastest laps: 2
- Best finish: 8th in 2021

Previous series
- 2015-16 2013-14: Renault Clio Cup France; Peugeot 208 Racing Cup France; Peugeot 308 Racing Cup

Jimmy Clairet (born 20 December 1990) is a French racing driver currently competing in the TCR International Series. Having previously competed in the French Renault Clio Cup & French Peugeot 208 Racing Cup.

== Racing career ==
Clairet began his career in 2013 in the French Peugeot 208 Racing Cup, he raced there up until 2014 and finished second in the championship standings that year. He switched to the French Renault Clio Cup for 2015, taking a single victory on his way to finish sixth in the standings. He stayed in the championship for 2016.

In April 2016, it was announced that Clairet would race in the TCR International Series, driving a Peugeot 308 Racing Cup for Sébastien Loeb Racing.

== Racing record ==
=== Complete TCR International Series results ===
(key) (Races in bold indicate pole position) (Races in italics indicate fastest lap)

Year	Team	Car	1	2	3	4	5	6	7	8	9	10	11	12	13	14	15	16	17	18	19	20	21	22	DC	Points
2016	Sébastien Loeb Racing	Peugeot 308 Racing Cup	BHR; 1	BHR; 2	EST; 1	EST; 2	SPA; 1; 13	SPA; 2; 13	IMO; 1	IMO; 2	SAL; 1	SAL; 2	OSC; 1	OSC; 2	SOC; 1	SOC; 2	CHA; 1	CHA; 2	MRN; 1	MRN; 2	SEP; 1	SEP; 2	MAC; 1	MAC; 2	NC	0

=== Complete TCR Europe Touring Car Series results ===
(key) (Races in bold indicate pole position) (Races in italics indicate fastest lap)

Year	Team	Car	1	2	3	4	5	6	7	8	9	10	11	12	13	14	DC	Points
2019	Team Clairet Sport	Peugeot 308 TCR	HUN; 1; 14	HUN; 2; 27†	HOC; 1; 10	HOC; 2; 16	SPA; 1; 5	SPA; 2; 22	RBR; 1; 14	RBR; 2; 13	OSC; 1 Ret	OSC; 2; 15	CAT; 1; 24	CAT; 2; 29†	MNZ; 1; 17	MNZ; 2; 8	20th	63
2020	Team Clairet Sport	Peugeot 308 TCR	LEC; 1; 6^{5}	LEC; 2; 23	ZOL; 1; 9	ZOL; 2; 12	MNZ; 1 Ret^{3}	MNZ; 2; 4	CAT; 1; 11	CAT; 2; 9	SPA; 1; 12	SPA; 2; 18	JAR; 1; 12	JAR; 2; 10			14th	129
2021	Team Clairet Sport	Peugeot 308 TCR	SVK; 1 Ret	SVK; 2; 9	LEC; 1; 3	LEC; 2; 1	ZAN; 1; 7	ZAN; 2; 5	SPA; 1; 13	SPA; 2; 11	NÜR; 1; 15	NÜR; 2; 11	MNZ; 1; 4	MNZ; 2; 6	CAT; 1; 9	CAT; 2; 16	8th	220
2024	Gruppo Baldan by Comtoyou Racing	Cupra León VZ TCR	VAL; 1	VAL; 2	ZOL; 1	ZOL; 2	SAL; 1	SAL; 2	SPA; 1; 9	SPA; 2; 11	BRN; 1	BRN; 2	CRT; 1; 5	CRT; 2; 1			12th	86
2025	Team Clairet Sport	Audi RS 3 LMS TCR (2021)	**ALG**; **1**; 1^{1}	ALG; 2; 5	SPA; 1; 12	SPA; 2; 2	HOC; 1; 3	HOC; 2; 3	MIS; 1 Ret	MIS; 2 Ret	RBR; 1; 5	RBR; 2; 15	CAT; 1; 3^{6}	CAT; 2; 4			3rd	193

^{†} Driver did not finish the race, but was classified as he completed over 90% of the race distance.

=== Complete TCR World Tour results ===
(key) (Races in bold indicate pole position) (Races in italics indicate fastest lap)

Year	Team	Car	1	2	3	4	5	6	7	8	9	10	11	12	13	14	15	16	17	18	19	20	DC	Points
2023	GRM – Hangcha Forklifts	Peugeot 308 TCR	ALG; 1	ALG; 2	SPA; 1	SPA; 2	VAL; 1	VAL; 2	HUN; 1	HUN; 2	ELP; 1	ELP; 2	VIL; 1	VIL; 2	SYD; 1; 19	SYD; 2; 16	SYD; 3; 20	BAT; 1	BAT; 2	BAT; 3	MAC; 1	MAC; 2	61st	0
2026	ALM Motorsport	Honda Civic Type R TCR	MIS; 1	MIS; 2	CRT; 1; 23	CRT; 2; 7	CRT; 3; 8	LEC; 1	LEC; 2														21st*	26*
2026	Team Clairet Sport	Audi RS 3 LMS TCR (2021)								CVR; 1 Ret	CVR; 2 Ret	INJ; 1	INJ; 2	INJ; 3	CHE; 1	CHE; 2	CHE; 3	ZHZ; 1	ZHZ; 2	ZHZ; 3	MAC; 1	MAC; 2	21st*	26*

^{*} Season still in progress.
