= Bailey Sweeny =

Australian racing driver (born 2003)

- Nationality: (Australia) Australian
- Born: 7 February 2003 (age 23) Batemans Bay, Australia

Bailey Sweeny (born 7 February 2003) is an Australian racing driver who currently competes in the Super2 Series for Blanchard Racing Team.

== Career ==
Sweeny began karting in 2017, competing until 2021. In his time in karts, Sweeny most notably won the 2020 New South Wales and ACT state titles in the Senior Performance Light class. The same year, Sweeny also made his car racing debut in the Toyota Gazoo Racing Australia 86 Series as a member of the Erebus Academy. Remaining in the series the following two years, Sweeny scored three podiums in the series as he scored a best reason finish of fifth in 2022.

In 2022, Sweeny also made his debut in TCR competition, joining HMO Customer Racing to race in TCR Australia. In his first season in the series, Sweeny scored his maiden series in race two of the first Bathurst round, before taking his second win at the same venue in November to end the year fifth in points, as the rookie of the year. The following year, Sweeny remained with HMO Customer Racing for his sophomore season in TCR Australia. Starting off the season with two wins at Symmons Plains, before winning race three at Winton, as well as races two and three at Sandown en route to a third-place points finish.

Having spent most of 2024 on the sidelines, Sweeny made a one-off appearance in the Winton round of the RX-8 Cup Australia for Maisie Place Motorsport, in which he finished second in races three and four. Following that, Sweeny joined Image Racing to compete in the second Bathurst round of the Super3 Series. In his only round of the season, Sweeny finished second in race two and third in race two. Remaining under the Supercars Championship support bill for the following year, Sweeny joined Blanchard Racing Team as he stepped up to the Super2 Series following Super3's demise. In his rookie year in the series, Sweeny scored a best result of third in race one at Queensland Raceway, as well as two other top-ten results en route to a 13th-place points finish.

Sweeny returned to Blanchard Racing Team and the Super2 Series for 2026.

== Karting record ==
=== Karting career summary ===
Season	Series	Team	Position
2018	Australian Kart Championship — KA2		22nd
2019	Australian Kart Championship — KA3 Senior		12th
2020	Australian Kart Championship — KA3 Senior		7th
2020	Australian Kart Championship — X30		
2021	Australian Kart Championship — KA3 Senior		13th

== Racing record ==
=== Racing career summary ===
Season	Series	Team	Races	Wins	Poles	F/Laps	Podiums	Points	Position
2020	Toyota Gazoo Racing Australia 86 Series	Erebus Academy	3	0	0	0	0	0	– (Note: Championship was declared null and void as not enough events were completed.)
2021	Toyota Gazoo Racing Australia 86 Series		10	0	0	0	2	0	– (Note: Championship was declared null and void as not enough events were completed.)
2022	TCR Australia Touring Car Series	HMO Customer Racing	20	2	0	3	5	610	5th
2022	Toyota Gazoo Racing Australia 86 Series		15	0	0	0	1	879	5th
2023	TCR Australia Touring Car Series	HMO Customer Racing	21	5	1	5	6	784	**3rd**
2023	TCR World Tour	HMO Customer Racing	6	0	0	0	0	34	18th
2024	RX-8 Cup Australia	Maisie Place Motorsport	4	0	0	0	0	2	
2024	Super3 Series	Image Racing	2	0	0	0	2	267	4th
2025	Super2 Series	Blanchard Racing Team	12	0	0	0	1	804	13th
2026	Super2 Series	Blanchard Racing Team	2	0	0	0	0	180*	9th*

=== Complete TCR Australia Touring Car Series results ===
(key) (Races in bold indicate pole position) (Races in italics indicate fastest lap)

Year	Team	Car	1	2	3	4	5	6	7	8	9	10	11	12	13	14	15	16	17	18	19	20	21	Position	Points
2022	HMO Customer Racing	Hyundai i30 N TCR	SYM; R1; 15	SYM; R2; 2	SYM; R3; Ret	PHI; R4; 11	PHI; R5; 16	PHI; R6; 9	BAT; R7; 9	BAT; R8; 1	BAT; R9; 2	SMP; R10; 11	SMP; R11; 18	SMP; R12; 18	QLD; R13; 4	QLD; R14; 11	QLD; R15; 5	SAN; R16; 8	SAN; R17; 16	SAN; R18; 6	BAT; R19; 1	BAT; R20; C	BAT; R21; 2	5th	610
2023	HMO Customer Racing	Hyundai i30 N TCR	SYM; R1; 1^{2}	SYM; R2; 6	SYM; R3; 1	PHI; R4; 4^{4}	PHI; R5; 5	PHI; R6; 5	WIN; R7; 2^{2}	WIN; R8; 5	WIN; R9; 1	QLD; R10; DSQ^{2}	QLD; R11; 9	QLD; R12; 5	**SAN**; **R13**; 5^{1}	SAN; R14; 1	SAN; R15; 1	SMP; R16; 14^{3}	SMP; R17; 6	SMP; R18; 11	BAT; R19; 12	BAT; R20; Ret	BAT; R21; DSQ	3rd	748

=== Complete TCR World Tour results ===
(key) (Races in bold indicate pole position) (Races in italics indicate fastest lap)

Year	Team	Car	1	2	3	4	5	6	7	8	9	10	11	12	13	14	15	16	17	18	19	20	DC	Points
2023	HMO Customer Racing	Hyundai i30 N TCR	POR; 1	POR; 2	SPA; 1	SPA; 2	VAL; 1	VAL; 2	HUN; 1	HUN; 2	ELP; 1	ELP; 2	VIL; 1	VIL; 2	SYD; 1; 14^{4}	SYD; 2; 6	SYD; 3; 11	BAT; 1; 12	BAT; 2 Ret	BAT; 3 DSQ	MAC; 1	MAC; 2	18th	34

=== Super3 Series results ===
(key) (Race results only)

Super3 Series results
Year	Team	No.	Car	1	2	3	4	5	6	7	8	9	10	11	12	Position	Points
2024	Image Racing	999	Holden Commodore VF	BAT1; R1	BAT1; R2	BAR; R3	BAR; R4	TOW; R5	TOW; R6	SAN; R7	SAN; R8	BAT2; R9; 2	BAT2; R10; 3	ADE; R11	ADE; R12	4th	267

=== Super2 Series results ===
(key) (Race results only)

Super2 Series results
Year	Team	No.	Car	1	2	3	4	5	6	7	8	9	10	11	12	Position	Points
2025	Blanchard Racing Team	33	Ford Mustang S550	SMP; R1; 14	SMP; R2; Ret	SYM; R3; 13	SYM; R4; 9	TOW; R5; 12	TOW; R6; 6	QLD; R7; 3	QLD; R8; 14	BAT; R9; 18	BAT; R10; 17	ADE; R11; 18	ADE; R12; 12	13th	804
