= Comtoyou Racing =

Belgian auto racing team

(Belgium) Comtoyou Racing
- Founded: 2014
- Base: Gembloux, Belgium
- Team principal(s): (Belgium) Jean-Michel Baert
- Current series: GT World Challenge Europe Sprint Cup; GT World Challenge Europe Endurance Cup; DTM
- Former series: TCR Europe Touring Car Series; World Touring Car Cup; TCR International Series; Fun Cup; ADAC TCR Germany Touring Car Championship
- Current drivers: (Belgium) Nicolas Baert (Belgium) Kobe Pauwels (Denmark) Nicki Thiim (Denmark) Marco Sorensen (Italy) Mattia Drudi (United States) AJ Muss (Italy) Felice Jelmini (Canada) Kyle Marcelli (Brazil) Marcelo Tomasoni (France) Sébastien Baud (Sweden) Oliver Soderstrom (France) Arthur Dorison (Canada) Lance Stroll (France) Baudouin Detout (Belgium) Sarah Bovy (Belgium) Xavier Knauf (Belgium) Gregory Servais (Brazil) Sérgio Sette Câmara
- Website: https://www.comtoyouracing.com/

JNVS Sprl
- Type: Sprl
- Industry: Automotive industry
- Founded: October 15, 2015; 11 years ago in Waterloo, Walloon Brabant, Belgium
- Founder: Jean-Michel Baert
- Headquarters: Rue des Poiriers 5, Gembloux, Belgium
- Operating income: ▼€ (2017)
- Net income: ▼€ (2017)
- Total assets: ▲€ (2017)
- Total equity: €
- Number of employees: 3 (2026)

JNVS Sprl, competing as Comtoyou Racing, is a Belgian auto racing team based in Gembloux, Belgium. Upon its creation the team raced in the Fun Cup. The team has also previously raced in the TCR International Series in 2017. Between 2018 and 2023, Comtoyou Racing represented Audi Sport in the World Touring Car Cup. From 2024 onwards, the team will race Aston Martin cars in various GT3 and GT4 championships.

== Racing history ==
=== 2014–16: Fun Cup ===
Having first entered the championship in 2014, the team raced in the series for many seasons with four or five cars. Having taken many great results, the team kept entering the series for many years. However, the team have never won the championship as of 2016.

=== 2017–2023: Audi Sport representation in TCR and GT Racing ===
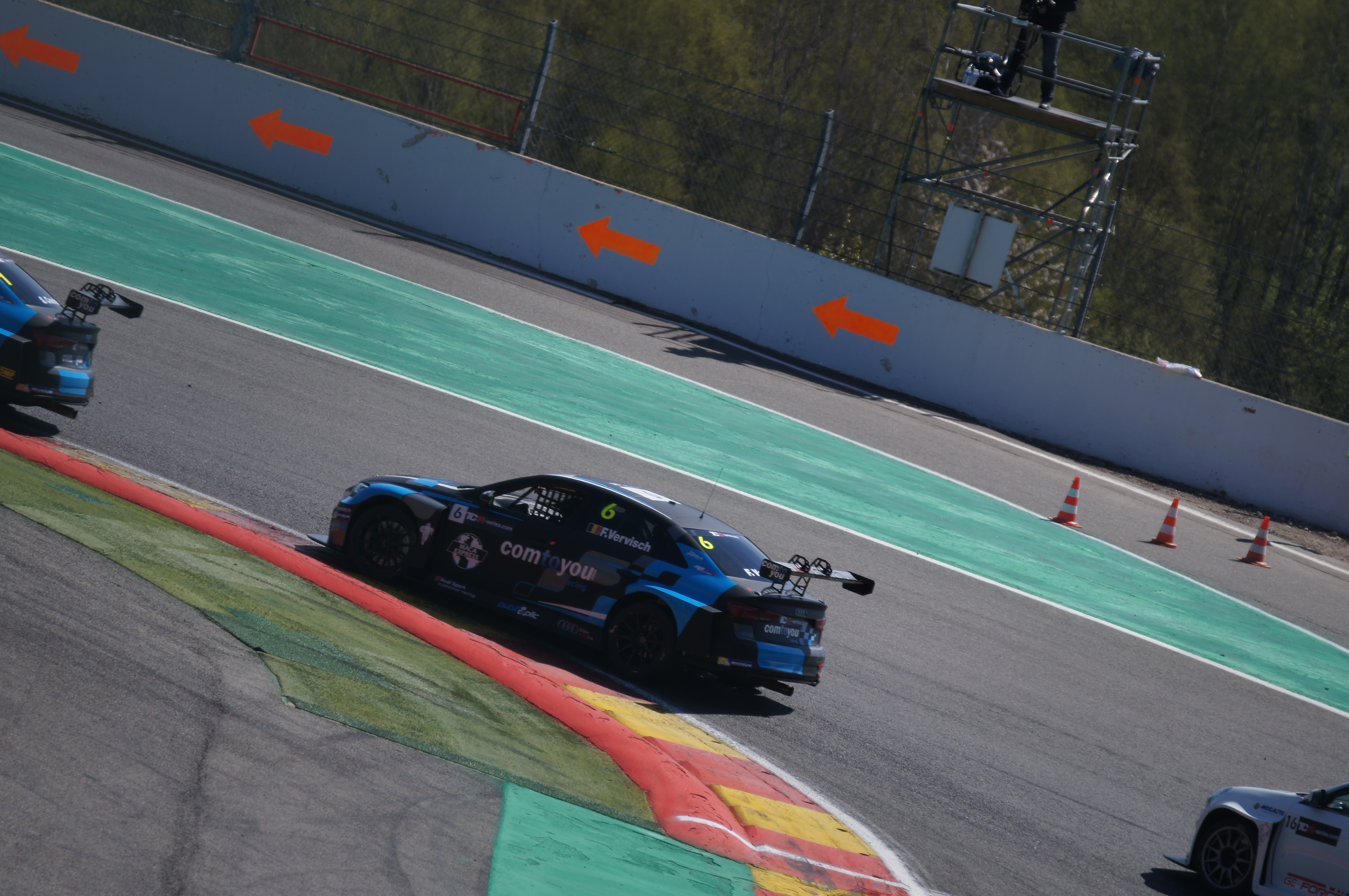
Audi RS3 LMS from Comtoyou Racing at Spa-Francorchamps

After having raced in the Fun Cup, the team entered the 2017 TCR International Series with two-time series' champion Stefano Comini driving an Audi RS 3 LMS TCR.
Comini took the team's first podium position in the series, in the opening round held in Georgia. They finished the season with a third place for Stefano Comini scoring a further three race wins.

Comtoyou Racing stepped up to the WTCR in 2018 after the TCR International Series was folded. The team ran four Audi RS3 LMSs in partnership with Audi Sport. They won one race in Macau with Belgian Audi factory driver Frédéric Vervisch. They continued to enter Audi RS3 LMS cars between 2019 and 2022 earning several wins and multiple podiums. The team's best result came in 2021 where they ended runner-up in both the Drivers' and Teams' championship. Aside from The WTCR Comtoyou Racing also ran in the TCR Europe Touring Car Series between 2018 and 2023, running similar Audi RS3 LMS cars. They won the Drivers' and Teams' title in 2020, 2022 and 2023.

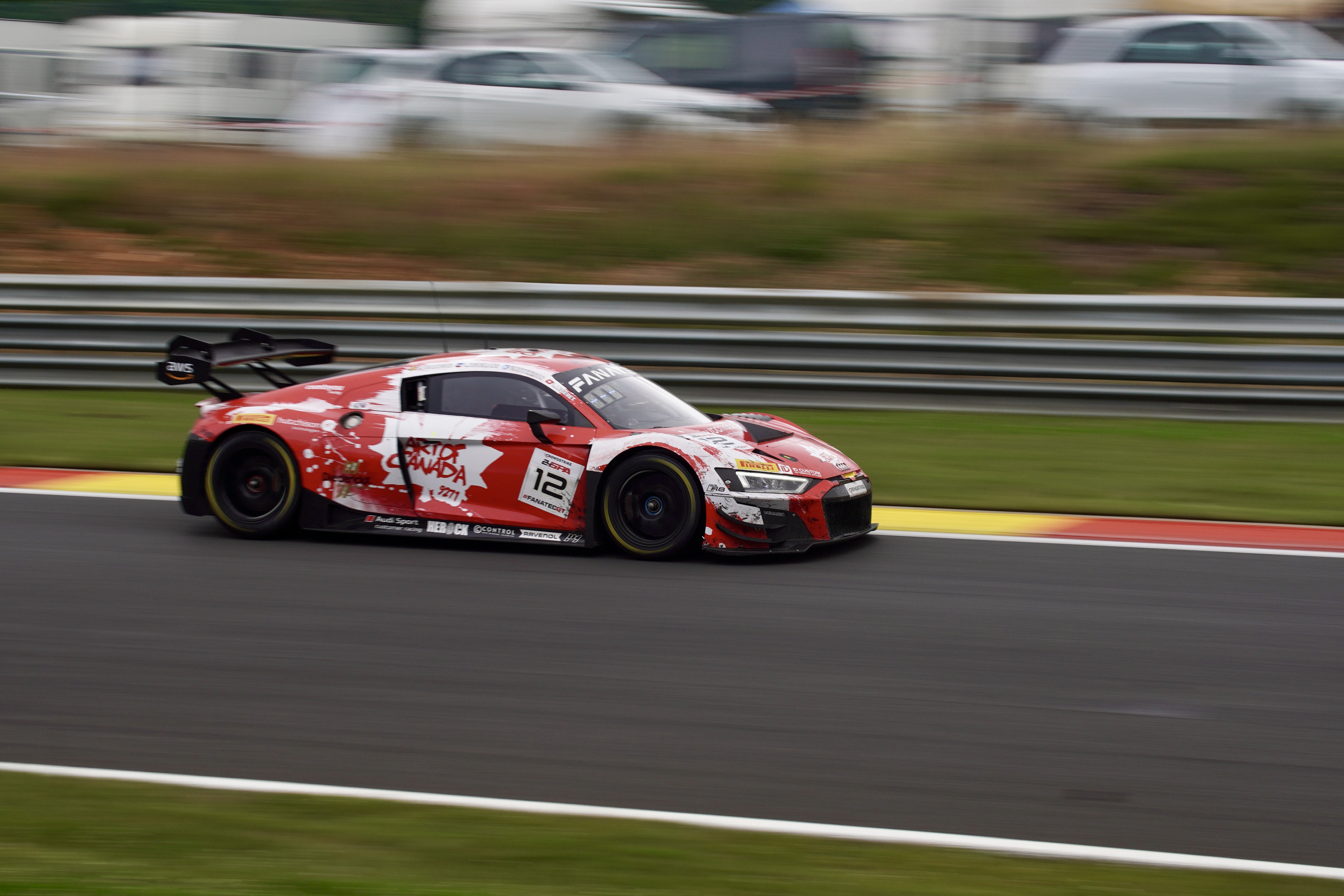
Audi R8 LMS GT3 #12 from Comtoyou Racing at the 2023 24 Hours of Spa

In 2023, Comtoyou racing announced their intention to race GT3 machinery. Given their close relationship with Audi Sport the team decided to purchase and enter several Audi R8 LMS Evo IIs in the GT World Challenge Europe. They decided to contest both the Sprint and Endurance cups. In their first race at Monza the team won in both the Gold & Silver Cup classes. At the end of the season the team won both the Drivers' and Teams' titles in the Gold Cup of the 2023 GT World Challenge Europe Endurance Cup. However, due to the decision of Audi Sport to end their factory backing in GT3 racing, Comtoyou decided to part ways with Audi at the end of the 2023 season.

=== 2024–present: Switch to Aston Martin ===
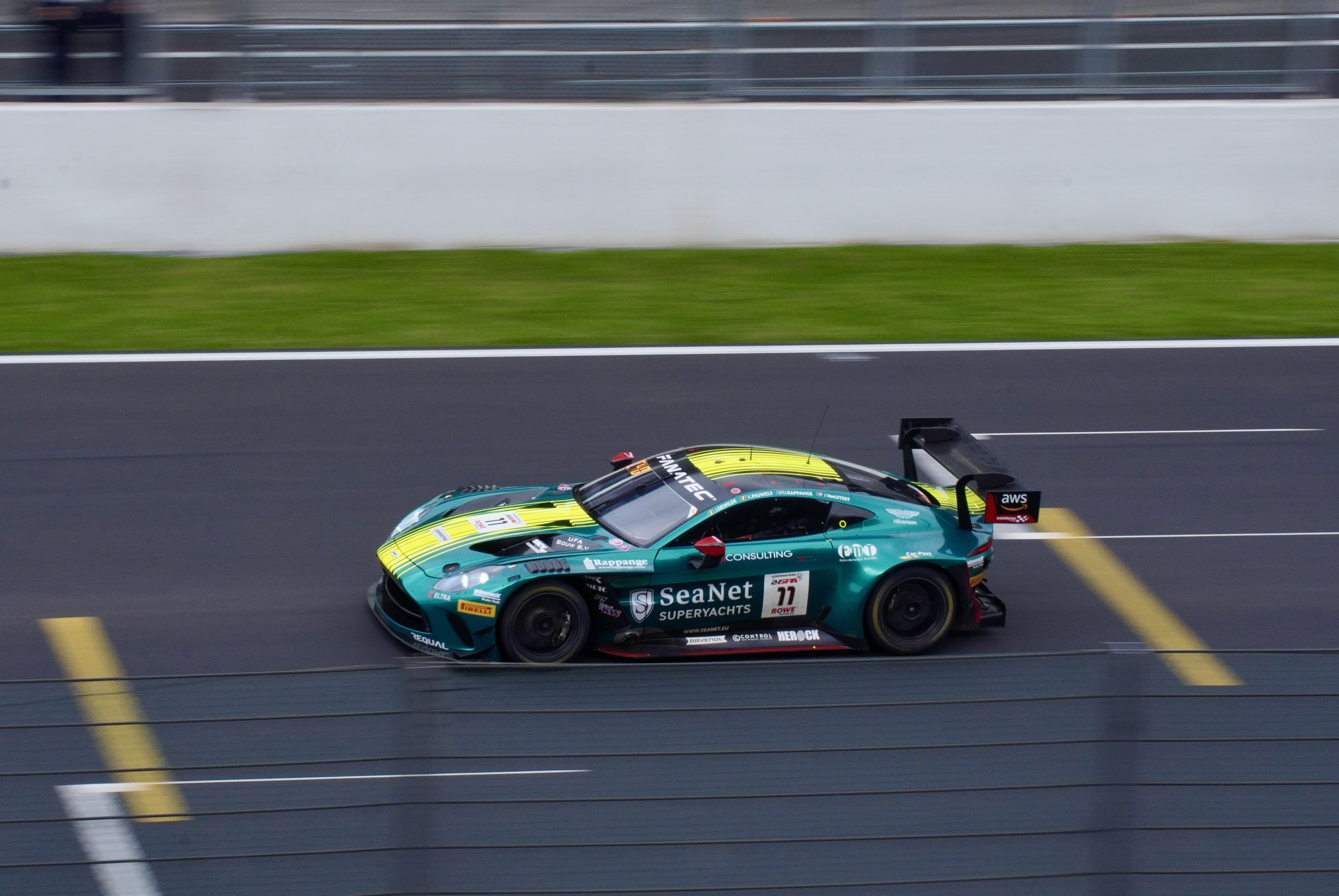
An Aston Martin Vantage GT3 from Comtoyou Racing during the 2024 24 Hours of Spa

On 30 September 2023, it was announced that Comtoyou Racing would form a new partnership with Aston Martin Racing. The team entered several of the updated version of the Aston Martin Vantage GT3 as well as the GT4 cars in various championship under the name of AMR Comtoyou Racing, receiving factory support. On 30 June 2024, Comtoyou Racing won the 2024 24 Hours of Spa with the Aston Martin Vantage GT3 #007 driven by Mattia Drudi, Marco Sorensen and Nicki Thiim. The car was on route to second when it inherited the lead less than 1 hour from the finish when the leading Ferrari was blocked in the pitlane by a stranded car. This victory marked Comtoyou Racing's first major victory as well as Aston Martin's first win in the Spa 24 Hours since 1948.

In August 2026, Comtoyou Racing and Code Racing Development announced the creation of the Comtoyou Junior Team by Code, a driver development programme intended to provide a pathway from GT4 to GT3 within Aston Martin Racing’s customer-team structure. The programme is scheduled to compete in the GT4 European Series from 2027.

== Racing record ==
=== Notable victories ===
- Overall winner – 2024 24 Hours of Spa–Francorchamps - GT World Challenge Europe
- Overall winner – 2026 12 Hours of Paul Ricard - GT World Challenge Europe
- Overall winner – 2026 3 Hours of Nürbürgring - GT World Challenge Europe
- Overall winner – 2026 DTM Norisring - Race 1
- Overall winner – 2026 DTM Norisring - Race 2

=== Main championship titles ===
- TCR Europe Touring Car Series
  - Drivers' champion in 2020, 2022 and 2023
  - Teams' champion in 2020, 2022 and 2023
- GT World Challenge Europe
  - Audi Sport
  - Gold Drivers' champion Endurance Cup in 2023 GT World Challenge Europe - Nicolas Baert and Maxime Soulet
  - Gold Teams' champion Endurance Cup in 2023 GT World Challenge Europe
  - Aston Martin Racing
  - Silver Drivers' champion Sprint Cup in 2025 GT World Challenge Europe - Kobe Pauwels and Jamie Day
  - Silver Teams' champion Sprint Cup in 2025 GT World Challenge Europe

=== Deutsche Tourenwagen Masters ===
Year	Car	Drivers	Races	Wins	Poles	F/Laps	Podiums	Points	D.C.	T.C.
2025	Aston Martin Vantage AMR GT3 Evo	(Belgium) Gilles Magnus	16	0	1	0	0	35	20th	12th
2025	Aston Martin Vantage AMR GT3 Evo	(Belgium) Nicolas Baert	16	0	0	0	0	3	24th	12th
2026	Aston Martin Vantage AMR GT3 Evo	(Denmark) Nicki Thiim	16	2	3	2	3	149	6th	9th
2026	Aston Martin Vantage AMR GT3 Evo	(Belgium) Nicolas Baert	16	0	0	0	0	8	21st	9th

== Timeline ==
Current series
Fun Cup	2014–present
GT World Challenge Europe Endurance Cup	2023–present
GT World Challenge Europe Sprint Cup	2023–present
Deutsche Tourenwagen Masters	2025–present
ADAC GT Masters	2025–present
Former Series
TCR International Series	2017
World Touring Car Cup	2018–2022
TCR Europe Touring Car Series	2018–2024
ADAC TCR Germany Touring Car Championship	2019, 2022
TCR World Tour	2023
International GT Open	2024
