= 2024 TCR Australia Touring Car Series =

Motor racing competition

The 2024 TCR Australia Series (known for sponsorship reasons as the 2024 Supercheap Auto TCR Australia Series) was the fifth season of the TCR Australia Touring Car Series. The series ras as part of the Australian Racing Group's SpeedSeries. Initially, the rounds at Sydney Motorsport Park and Mount Panorama Circuit were scheduled to be part of the TCR World Tour, but the rounds were removed from that championship due to logistics issues for teams transporting cars in to the country.

Josh Buchan became the first multiple time and back to back champion of the series, after securing the championship.

== Calendar ==
Round	Circuit	Location	Date	Map
1	(Victoria (state)) Sandown Raceway	Springvale, Victoria	9–11 February	2024 TCR Australia Touring Car Series is located in Australia
2	(Tasmania) Symmons Plains Raceway	Launceston, Tasmania	15–17 March	2024 TCR Australia Touring Car Series is located in Australia
3	(Victoria (state)) Phillip Island Grand Prix Circuit	Phillip Island, Victoria	12–14 April	2024 TCR Australia Touring Car Series is located in Australia
4	(South Australia) The Bend Motorsport Park	Tailem Bend, South Australia	31 May–2 June	2024 TCR Australia Touring Car Series is located in Australia
5	Queensland Raceway	Ipswich, Queensland	2–4 August	2024 TCR Australia Touring Car Series is located in Australia
6	(New South Wales) Sydney Motorsport Park	Eastern Creek, New South Wales	18–20 October	2024 TCR Australia Touring Car Series is located in Australia
7	(New South Wales) Mount Panorama Circuit	Bathurst, New South Wales	8–10 November	2024 TCR Australia Touring Car Series is located in Australia

=== Calendar changes ===
The round at Queensland was originally set to be held on 12–14 July, but on 6 June, the event was moved to 2–4 August.

== Entry list ==
The following teams and drivers are contracted to compete in the 2024 championship.

Team	Car	No.	Drivers	Class	Rounds	Ref.
(Australia) HMO Customer Racing	Hyundai i30 N TCR	1	(Australia) Josh Buchan		1–3	
(Australia) HMO Customer Racing	Hyundai Elantra N TCR	1	(Australia) Josh Buchan		4–7	
(Australia) HMO Customer Racing	Hyundai i30 N TCR	15	(United Kingdom) Tom Oliphant		All	
(Australia) Wall Racing (Note: Car #2 entered under the commercial title "Honda Racing Team Wall", Cars #74 and #76 entered under the commercial title "Exclusive Switchboards".)	Honda Civic Type R TCR (FL5)	2	(Australia) Tony D'Alberto		1–6	
(Australia) Wall Racing	Honda Civic Type R TCR (FL5)	74	(Australia) Brad Harris		All	
(Australia) Wall Racing	Honda Civic Type R TCR (FK8)	76	(Australia) John Martin		1	
(Australia) Wall Racing	Honda Civic Type R TCR (FK8)	76	(Australia) William Harris		2–6	
(Australia) Wall Racing	Honda Civic Type R TCR (FL5)	76	(Australia) William Harris		7	
(United Kingdom) Carl Cox Motorsport	Cupra León Competición TCR	4	(Australia) Clay Richards		1–4	
(Australia) Ashley Seward Motorsport (Note: Car #11 entered under the commercial title "Autoglym Team Ashley Seward Motorsport".)	Lynk & Co 03 TCR	11	(Australia) Dylan O'Keeffe		All	
(Australia) Garry Rogers Motorsport (Note: Cars #18 and #79 entered under the commercial title "GRM Team Valvoline", Car #33 entered under the commercial title "GRM Team Schaeffler", and Car #71 entered under the commercial title "GRM Hangcha Racing".)	Peugeot 308 TCR	18	(Australia) Aaron Cameron		1–6	
(Australia) Garry Rogers Motorsport	Peugeot 308 TCR	33	(Australia) Jordan Cox		1–5	
(Australia) Garry Rogers Motorsport	Peugeot 308 TCR	71	(Australia) Ben Bargwanna		1–6	
(Australia) Garry Rogers Motorsport	Peugeot 308 TCR	79	(Australia) Ryan Casha		1–5	
(Australia) Garry Rogers Motorsport	Peugeot 308 P51 TCR	18	(Australia) Aaron Cameron		7	
(Australia) Garry Rogers Motorsport	Peugeot 308 P51 TCR	33	(Australia) Jordan Cox		6–7	
(Australia) Garry Rogers Motorsport	Peugeot 308 P51 TCR	71	(Australia) Ben Bargwanna		6–7	
(Australia) Garry Rogers Motorsport	Peugeot 308 P51 TCR	79	(Australia) Ryan Casha		7	
(Australia) Challenge Motorsport	Audi RS 3 LMS TCR (2017)	22	(Australia) Iain McDougall		1, 4	
(Indonesia) BRM Motorsport	Audi RS 3 LMS TCR (2021)	29	(Indonesia) Glenn Nirwan		1–6	
(Australia) Team Soutar Motorsport (Note: Car #110 entered under the commercial title "Tufflift Racing".)	Audi RS 3 LMS TCR (2021)	110	(Australia) Zac Soutar		All	
(Australia) 99Motorsport	Audi RS 3 LMS TCR (2017)	99	(Australia) Marcus LaDelle		1	
(Australia) 99Motorsport	Audi RS 3 LMS TCR (2017)	99	(New Zealand) Ben Stewart		5	
(Australia) 99Motorsport	Audi RS 3 LMS TCR (2017)	99	(New Zealand) Blake Knowles		7	
(Australia) Jude Bargwanna Motorsport	Alfa Romeo Giulietta Veloce TCR	179	(Australia) Jude Bargwanna		3	

== Results and standings ==
=== Season summary ===
Round	Race	Event	Pole position	Fastest Lap	Winning Driver	Winning Team
1	1	(Victoria (state)) Sandown Raceway	(Australia) Josh Buchan	(Australia) Josh Buchan	(Australia) Ben Bargwanna	Garry Rogers Motorsport
1	2	(Victoria (state)) Sandown Raceway		(Australia) Aaron Cameron	(Australia) Jordan Cox	Garry Rogers Motorsport
1	3	(Victoria (state)) Sandown Raceway		(Australia) Josh Buchan	(Australia) Ben Bargwanna	Garry Rogers Motorsport
2	1	(Tasmania) Symmons Plains Raceway	(Australia) Tony D'Alberto	(Australia) Tony D'Alberto	(Australia) Tony D'Alberto	Wall Racing
2	2	(Tasmania) Symmons Plains Raceway		(United Kingdom) Tom Oliphant	(Australia) Dylan O'Keeffe	Ashley Seward Motorsport
2	3	(Tasmania) Symmons Plains Raceway		(Australia) Dylan O'Keeffe	(United Kingdom) Tom Oliphant	HMO Customer Racing
3	1	(Victoria (state)) Phillip Island Grand Prix Circuit	(Australia) Tony D'Alberto	(Australia) Josh Buchan	(Australia) Josh Buchan	HMO Customer Racing
3	2	(Victoria (state)) Phillip Island Grand Prix Circuit		(Australia) Brad Harris	(Australia) Brad Harris	Wall Racing
3	3	(Victoria (state)) Phillip Island Grand Prix Circuit		(Australia) Ben Bargwanna	(Australia) Brad Harris	Wall Racing
4	1	(South Australia) The Bend Motorsport Park	(Australia) Tony D'Alberto	(Australia) Zac Soutar	(Australia) Jordan Cox	Garry Rogers Motorsport
4	2	(South Australia) The Bend Motorsport Park		(United Kingdom) Tom Oliphant	(Australia) Zac Soutar	Team Soutar Motorsport
4	3	(South Australia) The Bend Motorsport Park		(Australia) Josh Buchan	(Australia) Zac Soutar	Team Soutar Motorsport
5	1	Queensland Raceway	(United Kingdom) Tom Oliphant	(Australia) Aaron Cameron	(Australia) Tony D'Alberto	Wall Racing
5	2	Queensland Raceway		(United Kingdom) Tom Oliphant	(Australia) Ryan Casha	Garry Rogers Motorsport
5	3	Queensland Raceway		(United Kingdom) Tom Oliphant	(Australia) Tony D'Alberto	Wall Racing
6	1	(New South Wales) Sydney Motorsport Park	(Australia) Josh Buchan	(Australia) Josh Buchan	(Australia) Josh Buchan	HMO Customer Racing
6	2	(New South Wales) Sydney Motorsport Park		(Australia) Jordan Cox	(Australia) Dylan O'Keeffe	Garry Rogers Motorsport
6	3	(New South Wales) Sydney Motorsport Park		(Australia) Josh Buchan	(Australia) Aaron Cameron	HMO Customer Racing
7	1	(New South Wales) Mount Panorama Circuit	(Australia) Zac Soutar	(Australia) Zac Soutar	(Australia) Zac Soutar	Team Soutar Motorsport
7	2	(New South Wales) Mount Panorama Circuit		(Australia) Jordan Cox	(Australia) William Harris	Garry Rogers Motorsport
7	3	(New South Wales) Mount Panorama Circuit		(Australia) Dylan O'Keeffe	(Australia) Zac Soutar	Ashley Seward Motorsport

- For race 1 of the round at Symmons Plains Raceway, no points were awarded following a protest from Garry Rogers Motorsport that the race had not reached sufficient distance. Race 1 winner Tony D'Alberto elected not to start Race 3 of the event in protest of the result being nullified.

=== Championship standings ===
Points system

Position	**1st**	**2nd**	**3rd**	**4th**	**5th**	**6th**	**7th**	**8th**	**9th**	**10th**	**11th**	**12th**	**13th**	**14th**	**15th**	**16th**	**17th**	**18th**	**19th**	**20th**	**DNF**
Qualifying	6	5	4	3	2	1	0														0
Races 1 & 3	50	46	44	42	40	38	36	34	32	30	28	26	25	24	23	22	21	20	19	18	0
Race 2	35	31	29	27	25	23	21	19	17	15	13	11	10	9	8	7	6	5	4	3	0

- The driver who sets the fastest lap in a race receives one additional point.

==== Drivers' championship ====
Pos.	Driver	SAN (Victoria (state))			SYM^{1} (Tasmania)			PHI (Victoria (state))			BEN (South Australia)			QLD (Queensland)			SMP (New South Wales)			BAT (New South Wales)			Points
1	(Australia) Josh Buchan	**2**^{1}	6	2	2^{2}	6	11	1^{3}	Ret	3	3^{2}	3	2	6	3	3	**1**^{1}	3	1	3^{3}	6	6	747
2	(Australia) Zac Soutar	4^{2}	4	4	3^{3}	5	4	2^{6}	7	6	9^{4}	1	1	3^{3}	6	2	6^{6}	Ret	8	**1**^{1}	7	3	729
3	(Australia) Brad Harris	6	11	12	12^{4}	9	7	9^{2}	1	1	7	2	4	5^{4}	5	9	2^{2}	7	4	5^{4}	8	7	677
4	(Australia) Dylan O'Keeffe	9	9	9	10	1	3	3^{4}	Ret	8	4	8	5	Ret^{6}	7	6	3^{3}	2	2	2^{5}	4	1	654
5	(Australia) Jordan Cox	5	1	3	6	3	6	11	6	11	1^{3}	6	7	8	2	7	8	1	Ret	6	1	10	651
6	(Australia) Ryan Casha	7^{4}	3	5	Ret^{6}	10	5	6	3	12	6	4	3	10	1	10	11	8	6	7	5	4	649
7	(Australia) Ben Bargwanna	1^{3}	7	1	5	4	8	4	5	2	10	7	9	7	12	8	9	6	7	8	Ret	8	623
8	(United Kingdom) Tom Oliphant	11	12	Ret	8	2	1	7	9	7	11	5	Ret	**4**^{1}	11	4	4^{5}	Ret	5	4^{6}	3	2	536
9	(Australia) Tony D'Alberto	3^{5}	7	6	**1**^{1}	8	WD	**14**^{1}	8	4	**2**^{1}	13	6	1^{2}	4	1	5^{4}	Ret	DNS				490
10	(Australia) Aaron Cameron	13^{6}	8	8	7^{5}	12	9	8	2	10	5^{6}	9	11	2^{5}	13	5	Ret	5	3	Ret	DNS	DNS	475
11	(Australia) William Harris				9	Ret	DNS	10	10	9	13	12	10	9	8	11	7	4	Ret	9^{2}	2	5	369
12	(Australia) Clay Richards	8	2	7	4	7	2	5^{5}	4	5	8^{5}	Ret	8										347
13	(Indonesia) Glenn Nirwan	14	Ret	14	11	11	10	12	Ret	Ret	14	11	Ret	11	10	Ret	10	9	9				226
14	(Australia) John Martin	10	5	11																			83
15	(Australia) Iain McDougall	Ret	13	10							12	10	Ret										81
16	(New Zealand) Ben Stewart													12	9	12							69
17	(New Zealand) Blake Knowles																			10	Ret	9	62
18	(Australia) Marcus LaDelle	12	Ret	13																			51
19	(Australia) Jude Bargwanna							13	11	Ret													38

Key
Colour	Result
Gold	Winner
Silver	Second place
Bronze	Third place
Green	Other points position
Blue	Other classified position
Blue	Not classified, finished (NC)
Purple	Not classified, retired (Ret)
Red	Did not qualify (DNQ)
Red	Did not pre-qualify (DNPQ)
Black	Disqualified (DSQ)
White	Did not start (DNS)
White	Race cancelled (C)
Blank	Did not practice (DNP)
Blank	Excluded (EX)
Blank	Did not arrive (DNA)
Blank	Withdrawn (WD)
Blank	Did not enter (cell empty)
Text formatting	Meaning
**Bold**	Pole position
Italics	Fastest lap

Notes:
^{1 2 3 4 5 6} – Qualifying positions

- **^1** No points were awarded for race 1 at Symmons Plains due to the race not reaching sufficient distance.
