= Jude Bargwanna =

Australian racing driver

- Nationality: Australian
- Born: Jude James Bargwanna; 21 November 2004 (age 21) St George Hospital, New South Wales
- Relatives: Scott Bargwanna (father); Alf Bargwanna (grand father); Harry Bargwanna (great uncle); Jason Bargwanna (uncle); Ben Bargwanna (second cousin)
- Teams: Anderson Motorsport; Garry Rogers Motorsport; Burson Auto Parts Racing; Synergy Motorsport; Jude Bargwanna Motorsport; Waltec Motorsport; Duggan Family Racing
- Starts: 54
- Wins: 14
- Podiums: 10
- Poles: 3
- Fastest laps: 5
- Best finish: 1

Championship titles
- 2023: Australian V8 Touring Car Series

Jude James Bargwanna is an Australian motorsports racing driver currently racing Touring Car Masters. Jude was born on the 21st of November 2004 at St George Hospital, Sydney. Jude is son of Scott Bargwanna nephew of Jason Bargwanna (Bathurst 1000 winner) and grandson of Alf Bargwanna.

== Junior career ==
Bargwanna started in karts as a boy finishing second in the NSW Karting Championship KA4 Jnr class and KA3 Snr class.

In 2020, Bargwanna moved into Formula Ford driving a Spectrum to finish third in the New South Wales Formula Ford Championship in 2021 and 2022. He also campaigned in the New South Wales, Victorian and Australian Formula Ford Championship securing a few pole positions, race wins/ podiums and fastest laps.

== S5000 ==
Bargwanna had his first taste of the S5000 at the Goldcoast 500 in 2023 alongside the V8 Supercars for the first round of the 2023 S5000 Tasman Series running in the top five. He then ran the second round of the 2023 S5000 Tasman Series running in the top-ten. his best finish for the season was fifth and first in rookies.

== V8 touring cars ==
Bargwanna had his first season in a Supercar aboard Anderson Motorsports FG Falcon where he dominated most of the year. He wrapped up his first Australian Championship in 2023.

== TCR Australia ==
Bargwanna made his TCR Australia debut at Phillip Island in 2024.

== Touring Car Masters ==
Bargwanna is currently competing in the 2025 Australian Touring Car Masters Series aboard the famous Carlton Zero VB Commodore owned by the Duggan Family.

== Racing record ==
=== Karting career summary ===
Season	Series	Position
2015	Australian Kart Championship - KA12	37th
2017	Lithgow Kart Club – Junior	4th
2019	Australian Kart Championship – KA3 Senior	47th
2019	New South Wales Kart Championship – KA3 Senior	2nd

=== Racing career summary ===
Season	Series	Team	Races	Wins	Poles	F/Laps	Podiums	Points	Position
2020	Victorian Formula Ford Championship	Jude Bargwanna Motorsport	3	0	1	0	2	79	4th †
2021	Victorian Formula Ford Championship	Jude Bargwanna Motorsport	6	0	?	?	0	?	?
2021	New South Wales Formula Ford Championship	Jude Bargwanna Motorsport	11	2	?	?	5	?	3rd
2021	Australian Formula Ford Championship	Jude Bargwanna Motorsport	11	0	?	?	3	?	?
2022	Victorian Formula Ford Championship	Jude Bargwanna Motorsport	3	0	0	0	0	12	30th
2022	New South Wales Formula Ford Championship	Jude Bargwanna Motorsport	3	0	?	?	2	?	?
2022	Australian Formula Ford Championship	Synergy Motorsport	18	0	1	1	2	140	7th
2022	S5000 Tasman Series	Garry Rogers Motorsport	6	0	0	0	0	105	6th
2023	Australian V8 Touring Car Series	Anderson Motorsport	15	10	4	10	3	585	1st
2024	TCR Australia Touring Car Series	Jude Bargwanna Motorsport	3	0	0	0	0	38	19th
2025	Touring Car Masters	Duggan Family Racing	10	1	0	1	7	369	13th

† Cancelled due to COVID-19

=== Complete S5000 results ===
Year	Series	Team	1	2	3	4	5	6	Pos	PTS
2022	Tasman	Garry Rogers Motorsport	SUR; R1; 6	SUR; R2; 6	SUR; R3; 7	ADL; R4; 10	ADL; R5; 8	ADL; R6; 9	6th	105

=== TCR Australia results ===
Year	Team	Car	1	2	3	4	5	6	7	8	9	10	11	12	13	14	15	16	17	18	19	20	21	Position	Points
2024	Jude Bargwanna Motorsport	Alfa Romeo Giulietta Veloce TCR	SAN; R1	SAN; R2	SAN; R3	SYM; R4	SYM; R5	SYM; R6	PHI; R7; 13	PHI; R8; 11	PHI; R9; Ret	BND; R10	BND; R11	BND; R12	QLD; R13	QLD; R14	QLD; R15	SMP; R19	SMP; R20	SMP; R21	BAT; R22	BAT; R23	BAT; R24	19th	38

=== Bathurst 6 Hour results ===
Year	Team	Co-drivers	Car	Class	Laps	Pos.	Class pos.
2021	(Australia) Burson Auto Parts Racing	(Australia) Ben Bargwanna	Volkswagen Golf Mk5 GTI	D	116	19th	2nd
2022	(Australia) Burson Auto Parts Racing	(Australia) Ben Bargwanna	Audi TT RS	A1	127	9th	2nd
2023	(Australia) Burson Auto Parts Racing	(Australia) Ben Bargwanna	Audi TT RS	A1	87	DNF	

Sporting positions
Preceded by Tyler Everingham (2018)	Australian V8 Touring Car Series; 2023	Succeeded by Cody Burcher
