= 2021 Hi-Tec Oils Bathurst 6 Hour =

Australian endurance race (Bathurst)

Layout of the Mount Panorama Circuit

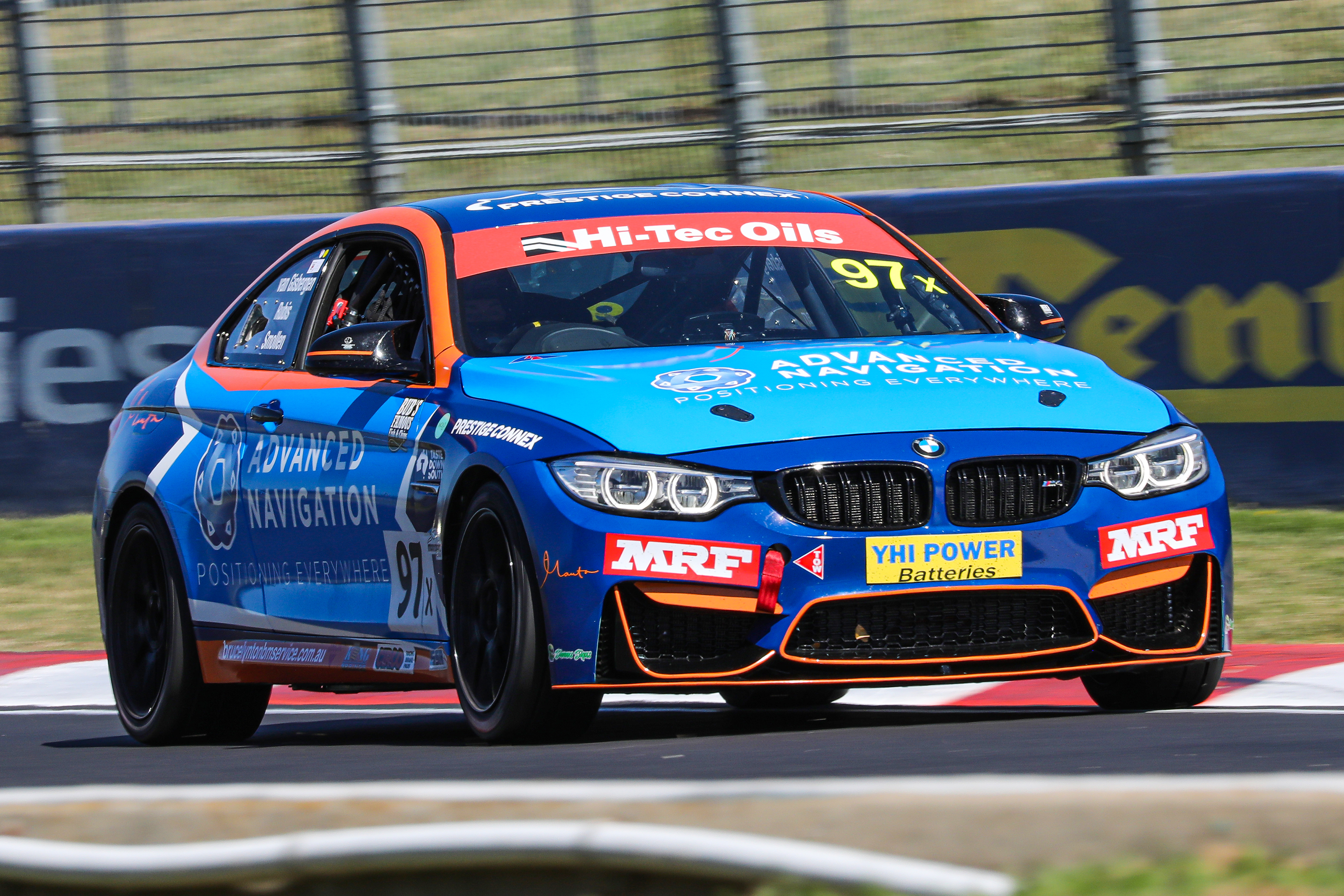
The race and Class X-winning BMW M4 F82 of Shane Smollen, Rob Rubis and Shane van Gisbergen.

The 2021 Hi-Tec Oils Bathurst 6 Hour was an endurance race for Group 3E Series Production Cars. The event, which was staged at the Mount Panorama Circuit, near Bathurst, in New South Wales, Australia, on 4 April 2021, was the fifth running of the Bathurst 6 Hour. The race was won by Shane Smollen, Rob Rubis and Shane van Gisbergen, driving a BMW M4.

== Class structure ==
Cars competed in the following classes:

- Class A1: Extreme Performance (Forced Induction)
- Class A2: Extreme Performance (Naturally Aspirated)
- Class B1: High Performance (Forced Induction)
- Class B2: High Performance (Naturally Aspirated)
- Class C: Performance
- Class D: Production
- Class E: Compact
- Class X: Ultimate Performance

== Results ==
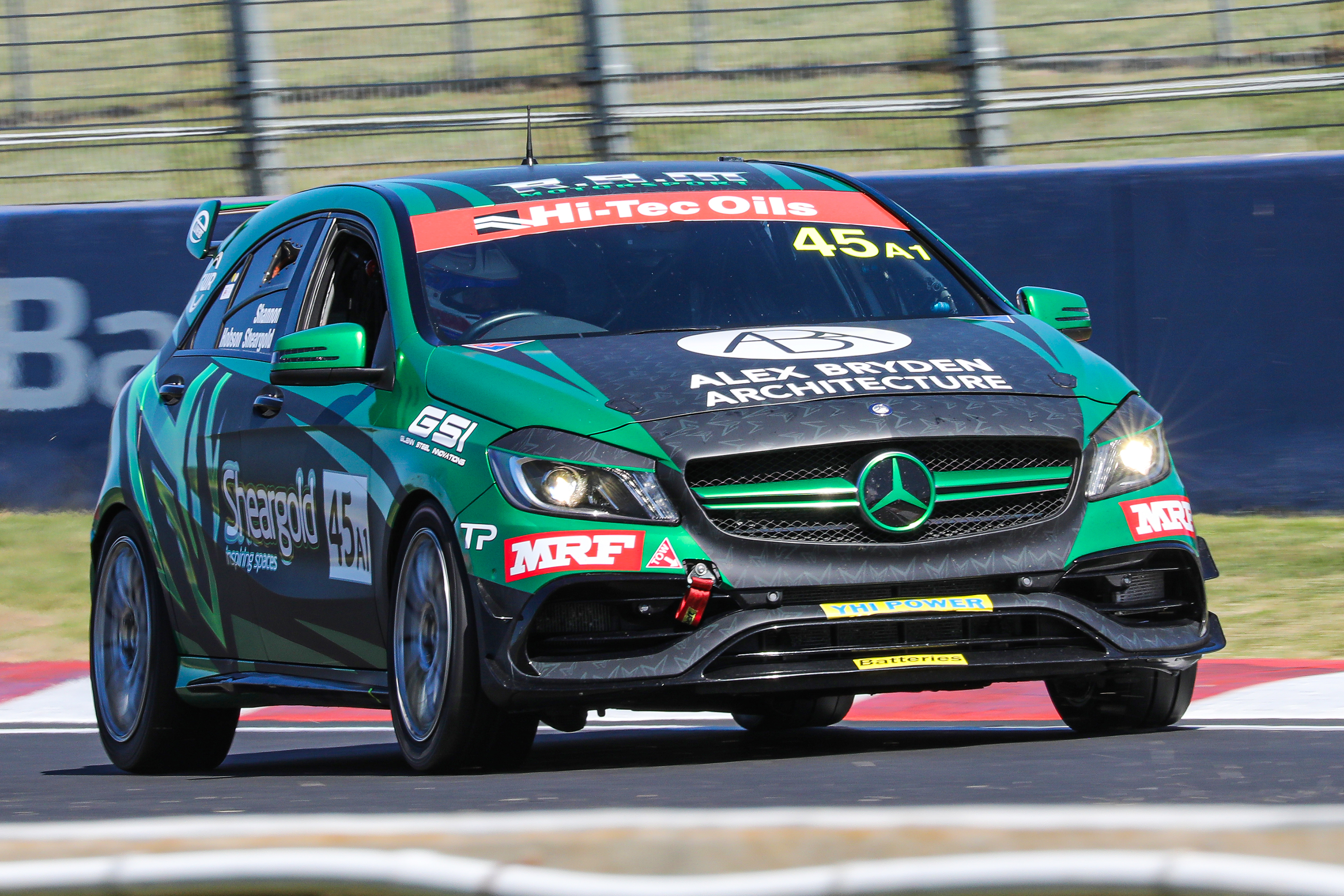
The Class A1-winning Mercedes-Benz A 45 AMG of Michael Sheargold, Brett Hobson and Ollie Shannon.

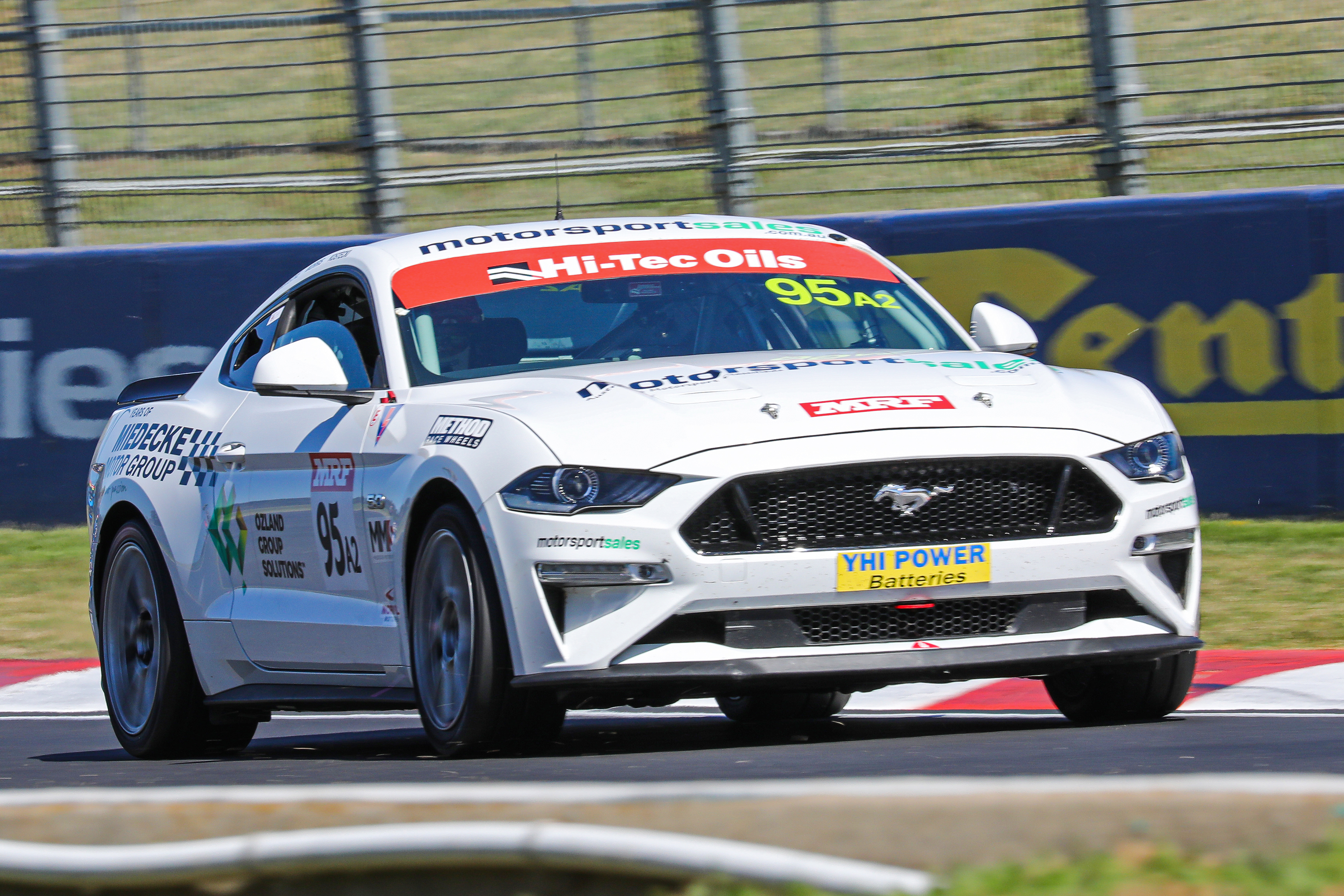
The Class A2-winning Ford Mustang GT of George Miedecke, Paul Morris and Brodie Kostecki.

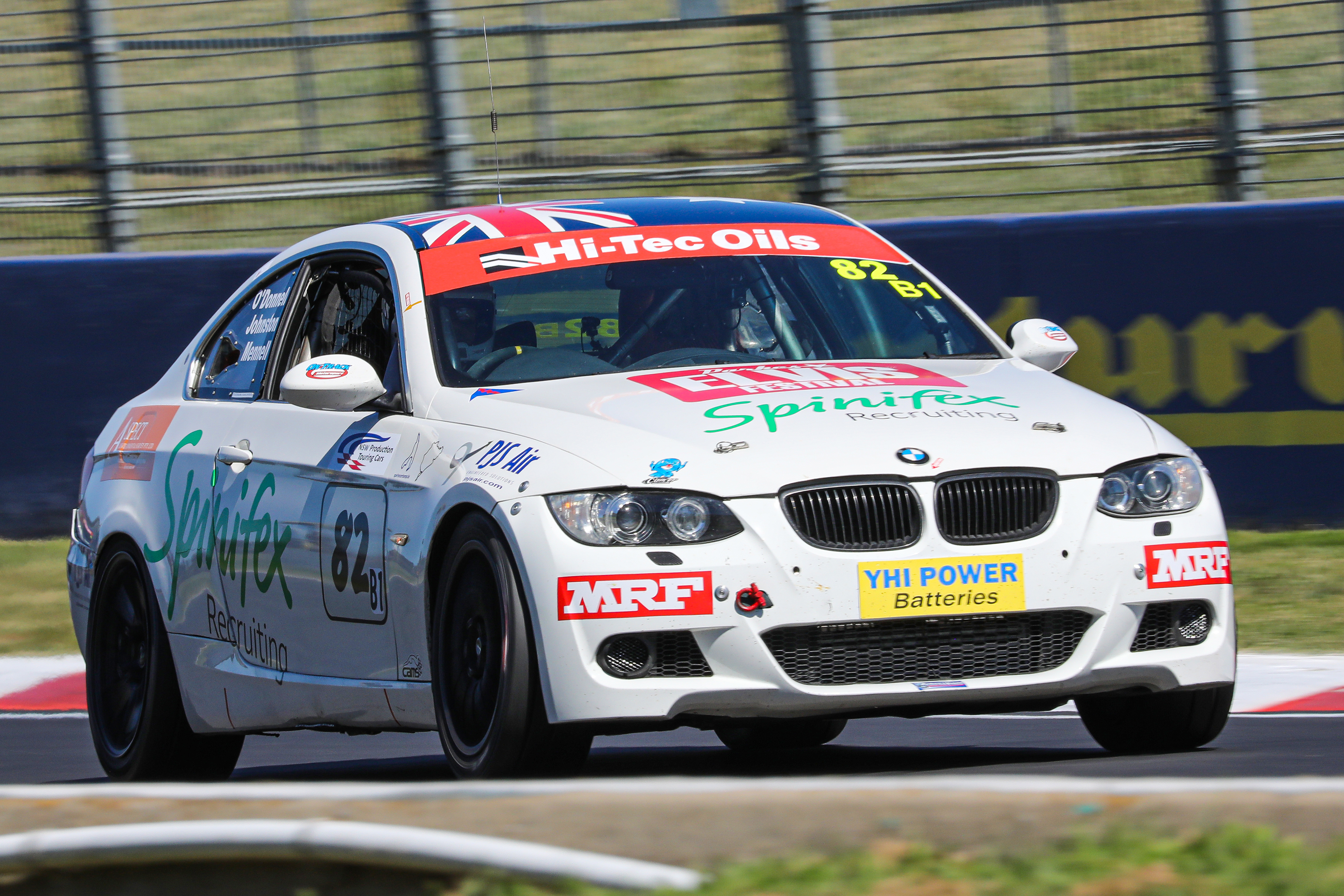
The Class B1-winning BMW 335i of Peter O'Donnell, Peter Johnston and Garry Mennell.

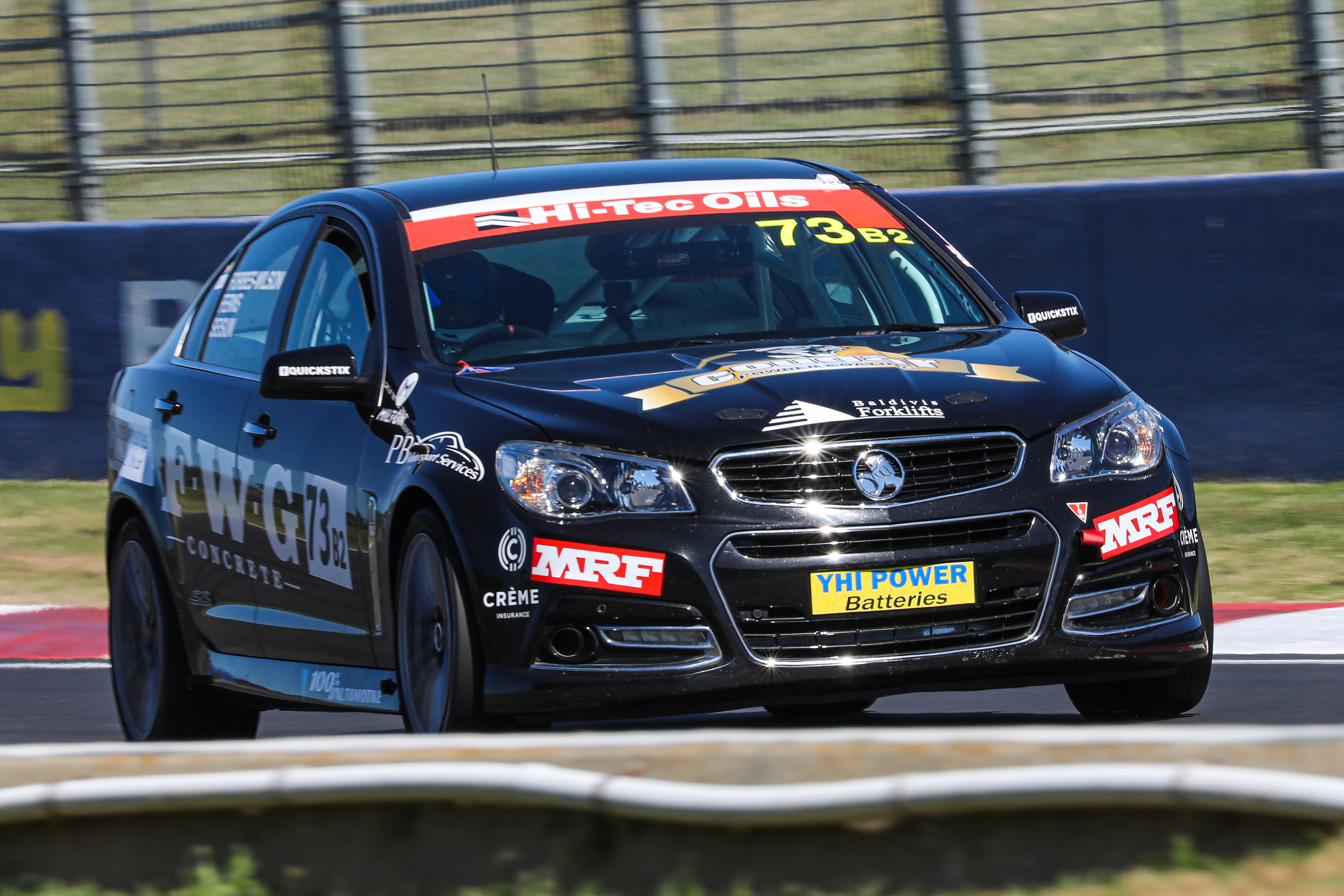
The Class B2-winning Holden VF Commodore SS V of Matthew Forbes-Wilson, Ashley Seisun and Michael Ferns.

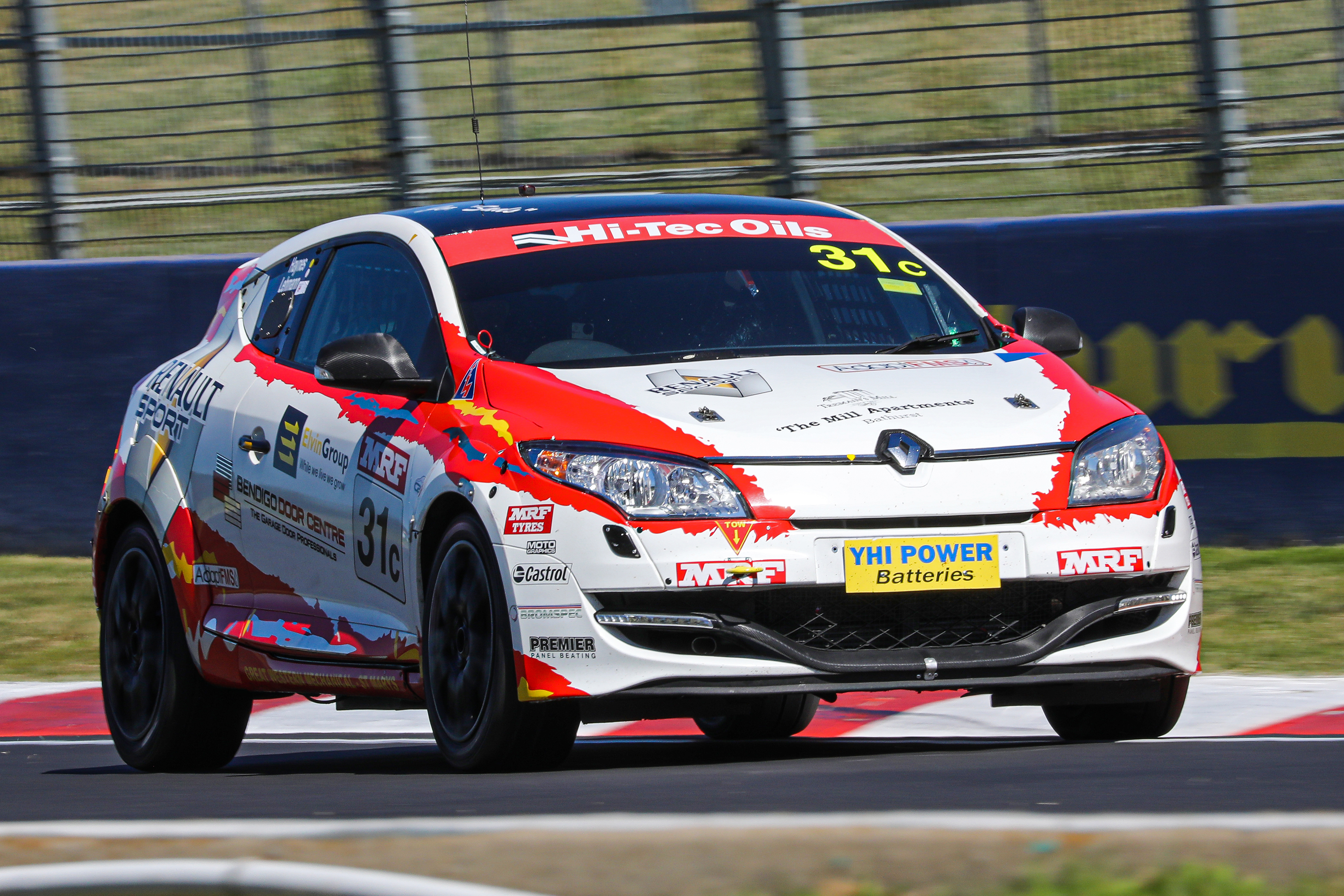
The Class C-winning Renault Mégane RS 265 of Josh Haynes and Kaide Lehmann.

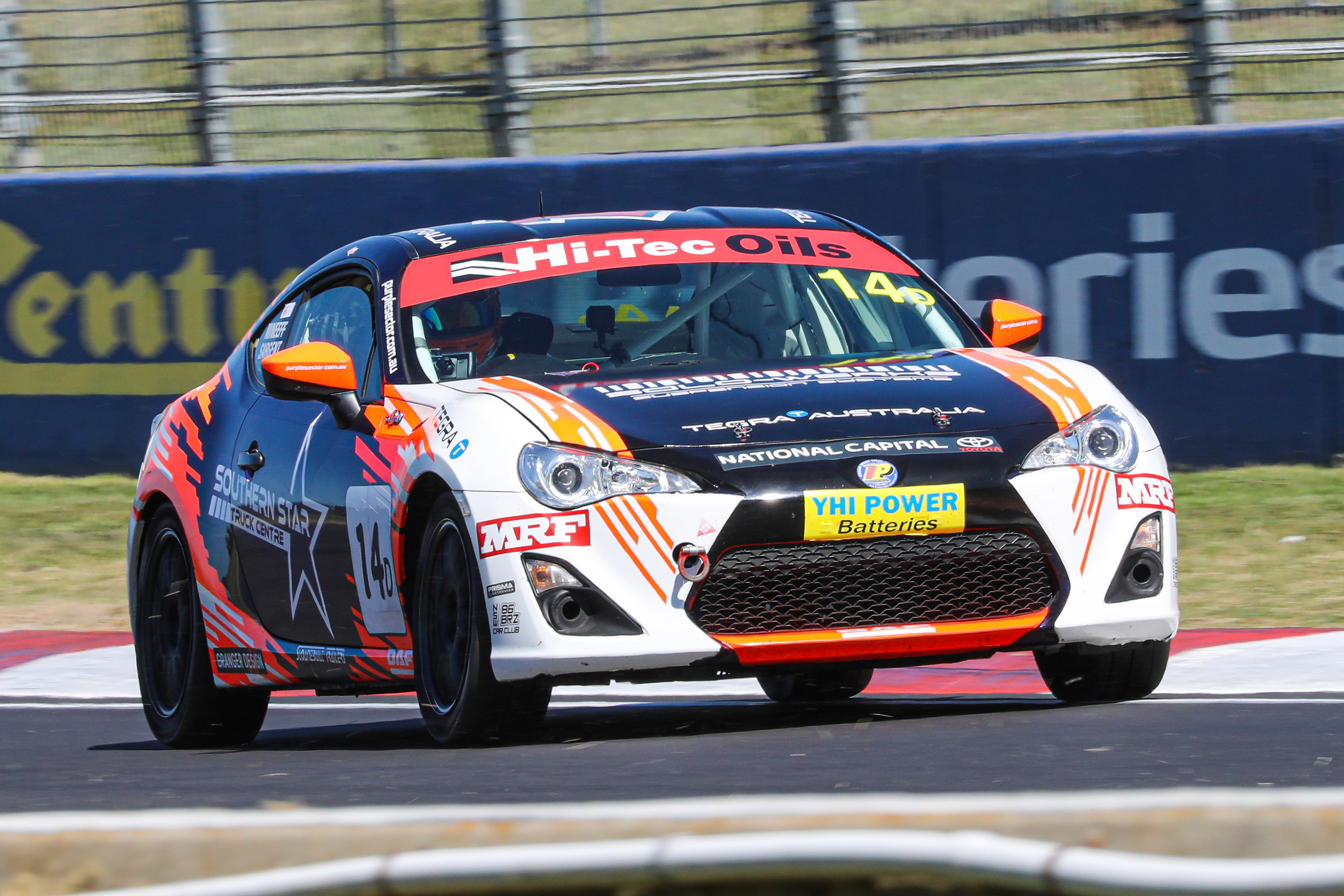
The Class D-winning Toyota 86 GTS of Lachlan Mineeff and Tom Sargent.

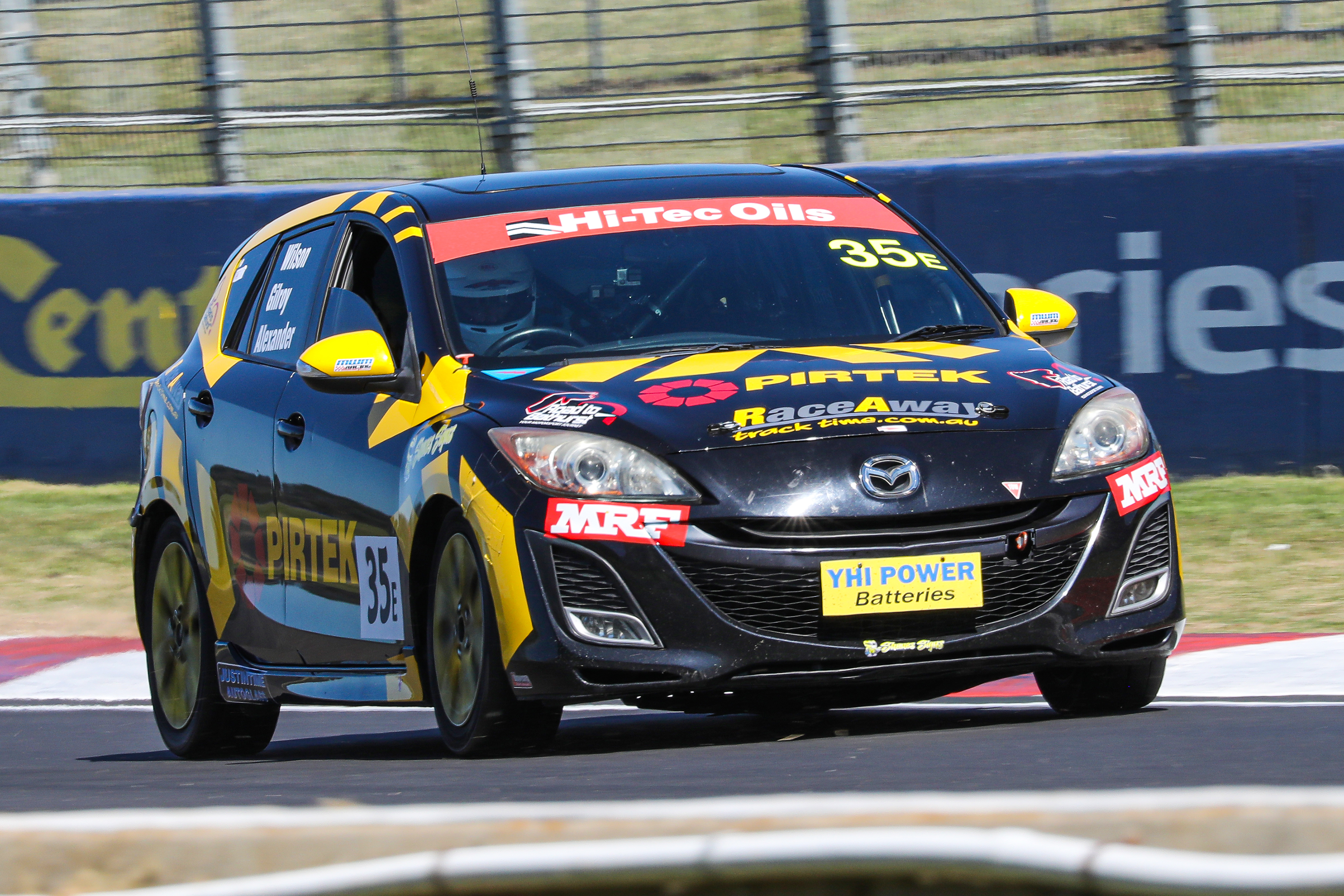
The Class E-winning Mazda 3 SP25 of Brianna Wilson, Ryan Gilroy and Phil Alexander.

Pos.	Class	No.	Drivers	Entrant	Car	Laps
1	**X**	**97**	**(Australia) Shane Smollen (Australia) Rob Rubis (New Zealand) Shane van Gisbergen**	**Bruce Lynton BMW**	**BMW M4 F82**	**120**
2	X	1	(Australia) Beric Lynton (Australia) Tim Leahey	Bruce Lynton BMW	BMW M3 F80	120
3	X	27	(Australia) Grant Sherrin (Australia) David Russell	Sherrin Rentals	BMW M4 F82	120
4	X	8	(Australia) Bradley Carr (Australia) Tim Slade	Carr Motorsport	BMW M3 F80	120
5	**A2**	**95**	**(Australia) George Miedecke (Australia) Paul Morris (Australia) Brodie Kostecki**	**Miedecke Motor Group**	**Ford Mustang GT**	**120**
6	A2	25	(Australia) Coleby Cowham (Australia) Lindsay Kearns	Greentech Gold Coast	Ford Mustang GT	120
7	**A1**	**45**	**(Australia) Michael Sheargold (Australia) Brett Hobson (Australia) Ollie Shannon**	**RAM Motorsport/GWR**	**Mercedes-Benz A 45 AMG**	**120**
8	A2	49	(Australia) Tony Alford (Australia) Kyle Alford	Racer Industries	Ford Mustang GT	120
9	A1	6	(Australia) Rod Salmon (Australia) Yasser Shahin (Australia) Neale Muston	Rod Salmon Racing	Mercedes-Benz A 45 AMG	120
10	A1	19	(Australia) Mark Griffith (Australia) Jimmy Vernon	Shockwave Racing	Mitsubishi Lancer Evolution X	120
11	A1	50	(Australia) Cem Yucel (Australia) Iain Salteri	Harding Performance	Volkswagen Golf R	120
12	A2	53	(Australia) Robert Coulthard (Australia) Trevor Symonds	Robert Coulthard Motorsport	CSV Mondo GT	119
13	A1	52	(Australia) Mark Eddy (Australia) Dean Grant	Mark Eddy Racing	Audi TT RS	119
14	A1	42	(Australia) Garth Walden (Australia) Michael Auld	Garth Walden Racing	Mercedes-Benz A 45 AMG	118
15	**D**	**14**	**(Australia) Lachlan Mineeff (Australia) Tom Sargent**	**CHE Racing**	**Toyota 86 GTS**	**117**
16	**B2**	**73**	**(Australia) Matthew Forbes-Wilson (Australia) Ashley Seisun (Australia) Michael Ferns**	**Race Academy International**	**Holden VF Commodore SS V**	**117**
17	X	99	(Australia) Steven Ellery (Australia) Tristan Ellery (Australia) Dalton Ellery	Bruce Lynton BMW	BMW M3 F80	117
18	A2	44	(Australia) Daniel Clift (Australia) Ashley Heffernan	Nolan Finishes	HSV VZ Clubsport R8	117
19	D	71	(Australia) Ben Bargwanna (Australia) Jude Bargwanna	Bargwanna Motorsport	Volkswagen Golf GTI	116
20	D	11	(Australia) Murray Dowsett (Australia) Mitchell Maddren (New Zealand) Matthew Payne	11Racing	Subaru BRZ	117
21	A2	28	(Australia) Bayley Hall (Australia) Steve Hay (Australia) Cameron McLean	Bayley Hall Racing	Ford Mustang GT	116
22	**C**	**31**	**(Australia) Josh Haynes (Australia) Kaide Lehmann**	**Osborne Motorsport**	**Renault Mégane RS 265**	**116**
23	C	5	(Australia) Doug Westwood (Australia) Colin Gillis	Cee3	BMW M3 E36	115
24	X	4	(Australia) Anthony Soole (Australia) Dylan Thomas	Holy Smoke Racing	BMW M4 F82	115
25	C	84	(Australia) James Hay (Australia) Paul Hansell (Australia) Patrick Navin	AC Store/CP Dental	Volkswagen Scirocco R	114
26	**B1**	**82**	**(Australia) Peter O'Donnell (Australia) Peter Johnston (Australia) Garry Mennell**	**On Track Motorsport**	**BMW 335i**	**114**
27	D	24	(Australia) Graeme Heath (Australia) David Hassall (Australia) Stephen Stockdale	SS Auto Memorabilia	Toyota 86 GTS	113
28	**E**	**35**	**(Australia) Brianna Wilson (Australia) Ryan Gilroy (Australia) Phil Alexander**	**Ric Shaw Racing**	**Mazda 3 SP25**	**113**
29	B2	40	(Australia) James Herrington (Australia) Ryan Gilroy (Australia) Drew Russell	Team Newcastle	Holden Commodore VE SS V	112
30	D	78	(Australia) Jason Walsh (Australia) Daniel D'Quino (Australia) Ben Crossland	Conroy Motorsport	Kia Proceed	110
31	A2	30	(Australia) Steve Pittman (New Zealand) Craig Baird (Australia) Scott Cameron	Spartan 1 Racing	HSV E Series GTS	110
32	E	46	(Australia) Ian Cowley (Australia) Daniel Natoli (Australia) Matthew Thewlis	Team Group Suzuki Racing Team	Suzuki Swift Sport RS416	109
33	C	47	(Australia) John Fitzgerald (Australia) Scott Turner (Australia) Urs Muller	On Track Motorsport	BMW 130i	107
34	A2	33	(Australia) Aaron McGill (Australia) Michael Caine	McGill Motorsport	FPV FG GT-F	106
35	C	51	(Australia) Chris Holdt (New Zealand) Madeline Stewart (Australia) David Ling	Prime Motorsport	Opel Astra VXR	101
36	D	86	(Australia) Richard Mork (Australia) Ric Shaw (Australia) Tom Shaw	V8 Racing	Toyota 86 GTS	99
37	B1	48	(Australia) Scott Gore (Australia) Keith Bensley	ASAP Marketing	BMW 135i	98
38	A2	18	(Australia) Graeme Muir (Australia) Jamie Hodgson	Gramur Stainless	HSV E Series GTS	94
39	C	3	(Australia) Nicholas McLeod (Australia) Ben McLeod (Australia) Cameron McLeod	Racer Industries	HSV VXR Turbo	94
40	E	43	(Australia) Michael Hopp (Australia) Steve McHugh (Australia) Michael Rice	Team Group Suzuki Racing Team	Suzuki Swift Sport RS416	77
DNF	A2	64	(Australia) Chris Lillis (Australia) Josh Muggleton (Australia) Mathew Holt	Cachel Homes	HSV VF ClubSport R8	112
DNF	A2	29	(Australia) Darren Forrest (Australia) Paul Razum	Forrest/Razztech Motorsports	HSV VF ClubSport R8	90
DNF	X	21	(Australia) Simon Hodges (Australia) Mark Caine	Secure Wealth	BMW M4 F82	89
DNF	E	2	(Australia) David Worrell (Australia) Andrew McMaster	Madaz Motorsport	Mazda 3 SP25	87
DNF	A2	16	(Australia) Jason Simes (Australia) Anthony Levitt	Boss Surveillance Systems	Mercedes-Benz C 63 AMG	87
DNF	C	89	(Australia) David Krusza (Australia) Jake Williams	Pinnacle Automotive	BMW M3 E36	74
DNF	X	41	(Australia) Tony Virag (Australia) John Bowe (Australia) Barry Sternbeck	Team Virag Racing	HSV VF GTS	74
DNF	C	20	(Australia) Peter Lacey (Australia) Robin Lacey (Australia) Matilda Mravicic	Gold Coast Embroidery	Volkswagen Scirocco R	64
DNF	A1	9	(Australia) Hadrian Morrall (Australia) Tyler Mecklem	Parramatta Vehicle Services	Mitsubishi Lancer Evolution IX	61
DNF	A1	57	(Australia) Matthew Boylan (Australia) Dimitri Agathos	FullGas Racing	Mitsubishi Lancer Evolution X	59
DNF	A1	55	(Australia) Daniel Flanagan (Australia) Merrick Malouf	Fifth Gear Motoring	Mitsubishi Lancer Evolution VIII	59
DNF	A1	59	(Australia) Ian Geekie (Australia) Anthony Carolan (Australia) Grant Stephenson	Luxury Auto Body	BMW 1 Series M Coupé	53
DNF	A1	17	(Australia) Jessy Bryan (Australia) Cody Donald (Australia) Angelo Mouzouris	Bloomfield Capital Racing	BMW 1 Series M Coupé	33
DNF	A2	7	(United Kingdom) Tony Quinn (Australia) Grant Denyer (New Zealand) Tim Miles	Keltic Racing	Ford Mustang GT	29
DNF	A1	77	(Australia) Zac Raddatz (Australia) Jack Winter	Radspeed Motorsport	Mitsubishi Lancer Evolution IX	23
DNF	A2	23	(Australia) Michael James (Australia) Antonio Astuti (Australia) Ryan Suhle	US Customs	HSV E Series GTS	23
DNF	A1	15	(Australia) Michael Kavich (Australia) Ben Kavich	Garth Walden Racing	Mitsubishi Lancer Evolution X	21
DNF	D	36	(Australia) James Holloway (Australia) Michael Holloway (Australia) David Brown	Brown Davis Racing	Toyota Celica	1
DNS	C	13	(Australia) Colin Osborne (Australia) Rick Bates	Osborne Motorsport	Renault Mégane RS 265	
DNS	A1	67	(Australia) Jeremy Gray (Australia) Broc Feeney (Australia) Stephen Robinson	JMG Racing	FPV FG GT-F	

- Class winners are shown in bold text.
- Race time of winning car: 6:02:25.5600
- Pole position: 2:25.4399, Shane van Gisbergen
- Fastest race lap: 2:26.4878, Shane van Gisbergen on lap 105.
