= 2022 Hi-Tec Oils Bathurst 6 Hour =

Motor racing competition

(Australia) Bathurst 6 Hour
Event Information
- Round 1 of 1 in the 2022
- Date: 15–17 April 2022
- Location: Bathurst, New South Wales
- Venue: Mount Panorama Circuit

Results
Race 1
Distance	130 laps	815 km
Pole position	David Russell; Btuned Euro Specialists	02:25.3327
Winner	Cameron Hill; Thomas Sargent; Cameron Hill Racing	

The 2022 Hi-Tec Oils Bathurst 6 Hour is an endurance race for Group 3E Series Production Cars. It will be the sixth running of the Bathurst 6 Hour.

== Entries ==
=== Classes ===
Symbol	Class
X	Ultimate Performance
A1	Extreme Performance Forced Induction
A2	Extreme Performance Naturally Aspirated
B	High Performance
C	Performance
D	Production
E	Compact

=== Entry list ===
No.	Class	Drivers	Entrant	Car	No.	Class	Drivers	Entrant	Car
1	X	Shane Smollen; Rob Rubis; Nick Percat	Prestige Connex	BMW M4 F82	2	E	Andrew McMaster; Dave Worrell	Madaz Motorsport	Mazda 3 SP25
3	A2	Nicholas McLeod; Cameron McLeod; Aaron Cameron	Racer Industries	Ford Mustang Mach 1	4	X	Anthony Soole; Adam Burgess; Anton de Pasquale	Holy Smoke Racing	BMW M4 F82
7	A2	Tony Quinn; Grant Denyer	Keltic Racing	Ford Mustang GT	8	X	Bradley Carr; Tim Slade	Carr Motorsport	BMW M3 F80
9	A1	Hadrian Morrall; Tyler Mecklem	Parramatta Vehicle Services	Mitsubishi Lancer Evolution IX	10	C	Peter McLeod; Benjamin McLeod; Brock Giblin	Racer Industries	HSV Astra VXR
11	D	Murray Dowsett; Brad McDonald; Mitchell Maddren	11 Racing	Subaru BRZ	13	C	Colin Osborne; Rick Bates	Osborne Motorsport	Renault Megane RS 265
14	A1	Paul Loiacono; Dieter Holzl; Alex Holzl	Forklogic	Mitsubishi Lancer Evo X	15	B2	Steve Cox; Peter Bray	Air and Allied Sales Pacific	HSV Clubsport R8
16	A2	Tony Levitt; Jason Shimes	Levitt Motorsports	Mercedes AMG C63	17	D	Mitchell McGarry; Shane Nowickyl; Jayden Wanzek	Mitch McGarry Racing	Toyota GT86
19	A1	Mark Griffith; Rod Salmon; Will Brown	Griffith Corp	Mercedes AMG A45	20	C	Robin Lacey; Matilda Mravicic; Peter Lacey	Gold Coast Embroidery	VW Scirocco
21	X	Simon Hodges; Jayden Ojeda	Secure Wealth Advisers	BMW M4	23	X	Beric Lynton; Tim Leahey; Will Davison	Bruce Lynton BMW	BMW M3 F80
24	A1	Michael Auld; Garth Walden; Tyler Everingham	Garth Walden Motorsport	Mercedes AMG A45	25	A2	Coleby Cowham; Lindsay Kearns	CK Motorsport	Ford Mustang GT
26	A1	Chris O'Brien; Ben Wilkinson	Infinium Advisory	BMW M135i	27	X	Grant Sherrin; Ian Sherrin	Sherrin Rentals	BMW M4
29	A2	Darren Forrest; Paul Razum	Penrite Racing	HSV Clubsport R8	31	C	Josh Haynes; Michael Osmond	Osborne Motorsport	Renault Megane RS 265
33	A1	Aaron McGill; John Bowe	McGill Motorsport	FPV FG GT-F	35	E	Phil Alexander; Scott Freestone; Michael Ricketts	Ric Shaw Racing	Mazda 3 SP25
36	D	James Holloway; Michael Holloway; David Brown	Brown Davis Racing	Toyota Celica SX	39	D	Haydn Clark; Scott Aho	Bow Wow Dog Treats	Subaru BRZ
40	X	David Russell; Nash Morris; Karl Begg	Btuned Euro Specialist	BMW M4	41	A2	Gary Beggs; Jim Mantefuel	Mantefuel Constructions	Holden VF Commodore SS V
44	A2	Daniel Clift; Ashley Heffernan	Nolan Finishes	HSV Clubsport R8 VZ	45	A1	Mike Sheargold; Dylan O'Keeffe; Ollie Shannon	Garth Walden Motorsport	Mercedes AMG A45
47	C	John Fitzgerald; Garry Mennell; Aaron Zerefos	OnTrack Motorsport	BMW 130i	48	A2	Keith Bensley; Scott Gore; Steve Owen	ASAP Marketing	Lexus RCF
49	A2	Tony Alford; Kyle Alford	Vision Estates	Ford Mustang GT	50	D	James Keene; Michael Sloss; Thomas Needham	Mid West MultiMedia Racing	Mini R56
51	C	Chris Holdt; David Ling; Madeline Stewart	Prime Motorsport	HSV Astra PJ VRX	54	D	Brett Parish; Mitch Wooller; Jaylyn Robotham	BPRO	Toyota 86
55	A1	Frank Mammarella; Scott Green	Selected Smash Repairs	Mitsubishi Lancer Evo X RS	56	A1	Brad Schumacher; Sergio Pires	Kelso Electrical	Subaru WRX STI
58	X	Wayne Russell; Drew Russell; Aaren Russell	Novocastrian Motorsport	BMW M3 F80	66	A1	Dimitri Agathos; Brianna Wilson	FullGas Racing	Subaru WRX STI
71	A1	Ben Bargwanna; Jude Bargwanna	Bargwanna Motorsport	Audi TT RS	73	B2	Matthew Forbes-Wilson; Mark Mallard	Creme Insurance	Holden VF SSV 6.0
77	A1	Jack Winter; Brayden Everitt	Max Winter Automotive	Mitsubishi Lancer Evolution IX	80	C	Ric Shaw; Tom Shaw; David Cox	Ric Shaw Racing	Mazda RX-8
84	C	James Hay; Paul Ansell; Coby Holland	AC Store	VW Scirocco	86	D	Richard Mork; Rob Boaden; Adrian Sarkis	Battlers to Bathurst	Toyota GT86
90	X	Duane West; Tony D'Alberto	KELAIR	Holden VF GTS	92	X	Ben Kavich; Michael Kavich	Garth Walden Motorsport	BMW M2 Competition
95	A2	George Miedecke; Marcos Ambrose; Tim Brook	Garry Rogers Motorsport	Ford Mustang GT	99	X	Steven Ellery; Dalton Ellery; Tristan Ellery	Bruce Lynton BMW	BMW M3
111	B1	James Meaden; Richard Davidson; Keith Kassulke	Team Brimarco	BMW 335i	118	A1	Dean Campbell; Cameron Crick	D A Campbell Transport	Mitsubishi Lancer Evo X RS
119	D	Connor Roberts; Lachlan Bloxsom	Arrow Transport Repairs	Toyota GT86	121	D	Jason Walsh; Ben Crossland; Hayden Crossland	Peter Conroy Motorsport	Honda DC5 Type R
140	A1	Mark Caine; Michael Caine	Showtell	BMW 1M	147	X	Thomas Sargent; Cameron Hill	CHE Racing	BMW M2 Competition
151	A2	Travis Lindorff; Adam Lowndes	Casey Accident Repairs	HSV VE GTS	155	E	Steve McHugh; Michael Hopp; Daniel Natoli	Champ Suzuki Racing Team	Suzuki Swift Sport
171	A1	Paul Buccini; Brock Paine; Jett Johnson	Team Buccini Racing	BMW M135i	186	A1	Robert Braune; Tony Moloney	Westvic Earthmoving	BMW 1 Series
222	A1	Cem Yucel; Ian Salteri	Harding Performance	Volkswagen Golf R	255	E	Ian Cowley; Matt Thewlis; David Bailey	Champ Suzuki Racing Team	Suzuki Swift Sport
355	E	Ian Aplin; Amar Sharma; Karlie Buccini	Champ Suzuki Racing Team	Suzuki Swift Sport	360	C	Jake Camilleri; Scott Nicholas	Grand Prix Mazda	Mazda 3 MPS
666	A2	Robert Coulthard; Trevor Symmonds	Triple 666 Racing	HSV VE GTS	777	A1	Matthew Boylan; Lachlan Gibbons	Pomelo Designs	Mitsubishi Lancer Evo X RS

== Qualifying ==
Pos.	No.	Driver	Car	Time	Gap
1	40	David Russell	BMW M4	02:25.3327	
2	8	Tim Slade	BMW M3	02:25.8722	+ .5395s
3	4	Anton de Pasquale	BMW M4	02:25.9680	+ .6353s
4	99	Dalton Ellery	BMW M3		+ s
5	23	Will Davison	BMW M3		+ s
6	1	Nick Percat	BMW M4		+ s
7	21	Simon Hodges	BMW M4		+ s
8	58	Drew Russell	BMW M3		+ s
9	45	Dylan O'Keeffe	Mercedes-AMG A45		+ s
10	3	Aaron Cameron	Ford Mustang Mach1		+ s
11	24	Garth Walden	Mercedes-AMG A45		+ s
12	19	Will Brown	Mercedes-AMG A45		+ s
13	7	Grant Denyer	Ford Mustang GT		+ s
14	118	Cameron Crick	Mitsubishi Lance Evo X RS		+ s
15	27	Grant Sherrin	BMW M4		+ s
16	9	Tyler Mecklem	Mitsubishi Lancer Evo IX		+ s
17	71	Ben Bargwanna	Audi TT RS		+ s
18	77	Jack Winter	Mitsubishi Lancer Evo IX		+ s
19	33	John Bowe	FPV FG GT-F		+ s
20	92	Ben Kavich	BMW M2 Competition		+ s
21	90	Duane West	Holden VF GTS		+ s
22	777	Lachlan Gibbons	Mitsubishi Lancer Evo X RS		+ s
23	14	Paul Loiacono	Mitsubishi Lancer Evo X		+ s
24	29	Paul Razum	HSV Clubsport R8		+ s
25	151	Travis Lindorff	HSV VE GTS		+ s
26	48	Steve Owen	Lexus RCF		+ s
27	66	Dimitri Agathos	Subaru WRX STI		+ s
28	171	Brock Paine	BMW M135i		+ s
29	666	Trevor Symmonds	HSV VE GTS		+ s
30	140	Mark Caine	BMW 1M		+ s
31	49	Kyle Alford	Ford Mustang GT		+ s
32	73	Mark Mallard	Holden VF SSV 6.0		+ s
33	56	Brad Schumacher	Subaru WRX STI		+ s
34	26	Ben Wilkinson	BMW M135i		+ s
35	55	Scott Green	Mistsubishi Lancer Evo X RS		+ s
36	44	Daniel Clift	HSV Clubsport R8 VZ		+ s
37	360	Jake Camilleri	Mazda 3 MPS		+ s
38	10	Benjamin McLeod	HSV Astra VXR		+ s
39	98	Chad Parrish	BMW 1M		+ s
40	84	James Hay	Volkswagen Scirocco		+ s
41	50	James Keene	Mini R56		+ s
42	54	Jaylyn Robotham	Toyota 86		+ s
43	186	Robert Braune	BMW 1 Series		+ s
44	20	Peter Lacey	Volkswagen Scirocco		+ s
45	121	Ben Crossland	Honda Integra DC5 Type R		+ s
46	119	Lachlan Bloxsom	Toyota GT86		+ s
47	80	Ric Shaw	Mazda RX-8		+ s
48	39	Scott Aho	Subaru BRZ		+ s
49	86	Adrian Sarkis	Toyota GT86		+ s
50	17	Jayden Wanzek	Toyota GT86		+ s
51	36	David Brown	Toyota Celica SX		+ s
52	2	Andrew McMaster	Mazda 3 SP25		+ s
53	35	Phil Alexander	Mazda 3 SP25		+ s
54	11	Mitchell Maddren	Subaru BRZ		+ s
55	355	Amar Sharma	Suzuki Swift Sport		+ s
56	155	Michael Hopp	Suzuki Swift Sport		+ s
57	255	Ian Cowelly	Suzuki Swift Sport		+ s
58	51	David Ling	BMW M3		+ s
DSQ	13	Colin Osborne	Renault Megane RS 265		+ s
DSQ	47	John Fitzgerald	BMW 130i		+ s
DNQ	15	Steve Cox	HSV Clubsport R8		+ s
DNQ	16	Jason Simes	Mercedes-Benz C63 AMG		+ s
DSQ	147	Thomas Sargent	BMW M2 Competition		+ s

== Race results ==
Pos.	Class	No.	Drivers	Entrant	Car	Laps
1	X	147	Thomas Sargent; Cameron Hill	CHE Racing	BMW M2 Competition	130
2	X	8	Bradley Carr; Tim Slade	Carr Motorsport	BMW M3 F80	130
3	X	1	Shane Smollen; Rob Rubis; Nick Percat	Smollen Motorsport	BMW M4 F82	130
4	A1	45	Mike Sheargold; Dylan O'Keeffe; Ollie Shannon	Garth Walden Racing	Mercedes-Benz A45 AMG	130
5	X	58	Wayne Russell; Drew Russell; Aaren Russell	Novacastrian Motorsport	BMW M3 F80	129
6	X	99	Steven Ellery; Dalton Ellery; Tristan Ellery	Bruce Lynton BMW	BMW M3	128
7	X	92	Ben Kavich; Michael Kavich	Garth Walden Racing	BMW M2 Competition	128
8	A2	7	Tony Quinn; Grant Denyer	Keltic Racing	Ford Mustang GT	128
9	A1	71	Ben Bargwanna; Jude Bargwanna	Bargwanna Motorsport	Audi TT RS	127
10	A1	14	Paul Loiacono; Dieter Holzl; Alex Holzl	Forklogic	Mitsubishi Lancer Evolution X	127
11	C	360	Jake Camilleri; Scott Nicholas	Grand Prix Mazda	Mazda 3 MPS	126
12	A1	26	Chris O'Brien; Ben Wilkinson	Infinium Advisory	BMW M135i	125
13	X	90	Duane West; Tony D'Alberto	DWE Motorsport	Holden Commodore VF GTS	125
14	A1	56	Brad Schumacher; Sergio Pires	Kelso Electrical	Subaru Impreza WRX STI	125
15	B	73	Matthew Forbes-Wilson; Mark Mallard	Race Academy International	Holden VF Commodore SSV 6.0	124
16	C	84	James Hay; Paul Ansell; Coby Holland	AC Store	Volkswagen Scirocco	123
17	A1	77	Jack Winter; Brayden Everitt	Max Winter Automotive	Mitsubishi Lancer Evolution IX	122
18	D	54	Brett Parrish; Mitch Wooller; Jaylyn Robotham	BPro	Toyota 86	122
19	D	39	Haydn Clark; Scott Aho	MDR Motorsport	Toyota 86	121
20	A2	3	Nicholas McLeod; Cameron McLeod; Aaron Cameron	Racer Industries	Ford Mustang Mach 1	121
21	D	119	Connor Roberts; Lachlan Bloxsom	Arrow Transport Repairs	Toyota 86	121
22	A1	186	Robert Braune; Tony Moloney	WestVic Earthmoving	BMW M135i	121
23	C	47	John Fitzgerald; Garry Mennell; Aaron Zerefos	On Track Motorsport	BMW 130i	120
24	A1	55	Frank Mammarella; Scott Green	Selected Smash Repairs	Mitsubishi Lancer Evolution X	120
25	D	121	Jason Walsh; Ben Crossland; Hayden Crossland	Peter Conroy Motorsport	Honda Integra Type R	119
26	D	11	Murray Dowsett; Brad McDonald; Mitchell Maddren	11 Racing	Subaru BRZ	119
27	X	23	Beric Lynton; Tim Leahey; Will Davison	Bruce Lynton BMW	BMW M3 F80	119
28	D	17	Mitchell McGarry; Shane Nowickyl; Jayden Wanzek	Mitch McGarry Racing	Toyota 86	119
29	A1	140	Mark Caine; Michael Caine	Massell Racing	BMW 1M	119
30	A2	29	Darren Forrest; Paul Razum	Forrest/Razztech Motorsports	HSV VF ClubSport R8	118
31	A2	49	Tony Alford; Kyle Alford	Racer Industries	Ford Mustang GT	117
32	C	80	Ric Shaw; Tom Shaw; David Cox	Ric Shaw Racing	Mazda RX-8	117
33	A2	48	Keith Bensley; Scott Gore; Steve Owen	ASAP Marketing	Lexus RC F	117
34	E	2	Andrew McMaster; Dave Worrell	LAN Installations	Mazda 3 SP25	116
35	D	86	Terry Denovan; Rob Boaden; Adrian Sarkis	Battlers to Bathurst	Toyota 86	116
36	A1	33	Aaron McGill; John Bowe	McGill Motorsport	FPV FG GT-F	114
37	A2	666	Robert Coulthard; Trevor Symmonds	Triple 666 Racing	HSV VE GTS	114
38	E	255	Ian Cowley; Matt Thewlis; David Bailey	Champ Suzuki Racing Team	Suzuki Swift Sport	111
39	D	50	James Keene; Michael Sloss; Thomas Needham	MidWest Multimedia	Mini Cooper S JCW R56	111
40	C	13	Colin Osborne; Rick Bates	Osborne Motorsport	Renault Megane RS 265	110
41	E	355	Ian Aplin; Amar Sharma; Karlie Buccini	Champ Suzuki Racing Team	Suzuki Swift Sport	109
42	E	35	Phil Alexander; Scott Freestone; Michael Ricketts	Ric Shaw Racing	Mazda 3 SP25	108
43	D	36	James Holloway; Michael Holloway; David Brown	Brown Davis Racing	Toyota Celica SX	102
44	X	4	Anthony Soole; Adam Burgess; Anton de Pasquale	Holy Smoke Racing	BMW M4 F82	102
45	A2	151	Travis Lindorff; Adam Lowndes	Casey Accident Repairs	HSV VE GTS	99
46	A2	44	Daniel Clift; Ashley Heffernan	Nolan Finishes	HSV Clubsport R8 VZ	94
47	B	15	Steve Cox; Peter Bray	Air and Allied Sales Pacific	Holden Commodore VZ SS	87
48	C	10	Peter McLeod; Benjamin McLeod; Brock Giblin	Racer Industries	HSV Astra VXR	84
49	E	155	Michael Hopp; Daniel Natoli	Champ Suzuki Racing Team	Suzuki Swift Sport	48
DNF	A1	171	Paul Buccini; Brock Paine; Jett Johnson	Team Buccini Racing	BMW M135i	116
DNF	A2	41	Gary Beggs; Jim Mantefuel	Mantefuel Constructions	Holden VF Commodore SS V	106
DNF	A1	24	Michael Auld; Garth Walden; Tyler Everingham	Garth Walden Racing	Mercedes-Benz A45 AMG	87
DNF	C	20	Robin Lacey; Matilda Mravicic; Peter Lacey	Gold Coast Embroidery	Volkswagen Scirocco	87
DNF	A1	9	Hadrian Morall; Tyler Mecklem	Parramatta Vehicle Services	Mitsubishi Lancer Evolution X	81
DNF	X	27	Grant Sherrin; Iain Sherrin	Sherrin Rentals	BMW M4	72
DNF	X	21	Simon Hodges; Jayden Ojeda	Secure Wealth Advisors	BMW M4	64
DNF	A1	222	Cem Yucel; Ian Salteri	Harding Performance	Volkswagen Golf R	61
DNF	A1	118	Dean Campbell; Cameron Crick	D.A Campbell Transport	Mitsubishi Lancer Evolution X	52
DNF	A1	777	Matthew Boylan; Lachlan Gibbons	Pomelo Designs	Mitsubishi Lancer Evolution X	48
DNF	A1	19	Mark Griffith; Rod Salmon; Will Brown	Griffith Corporation	Mercedes-Benz A45 AMG	44
DNF	X	40	David Russell; Nash Morris; Karl Begg	Begg Motorsport	BMW M4	5
DNS	A2	16	Tony Levitt; Jason Shimes	Levitt Motorsports	Mercedes-Benz C63 AMG	
DNS	A2	25	Coleby Cowham; Lindsay Kearns	CK Motorsports	Ford Mustang GT	
DNS	C	31	Josh Haynes; Michael Osmond	Osborne Motorsport	Renault Megane RS 265	
DNS	C	51	Chris Holdt; David Ling; Madeline Stewart	Prime Motorsport	HSV Astra VRX	
DNS	A1	66	Dimitri Agathos; Brianna Wilson	FullGas Racing	Subaru Impreza WRX STI	
DNS	A1	98	Carey McMahon; Chad Parrish; George Nakas	CAC Racing	BMW 1M	
WD	C	76	Luke King; Darren Whittington; Jarrod Hughes	Levitt Motorsports	Renault Clio	
WD	A2	95	George Miedecke; Marcos Ambrose; Tim Brook	Garry Rogers Motorsport	Ford Mustang GT	
WD	B	111	James Meaden; Richard Davidson; Keith Kassulke	Team Brimarco	BMW 335i	
