= Ben Bargwanna =

Australian racing driver

Benjamin Bargwanna
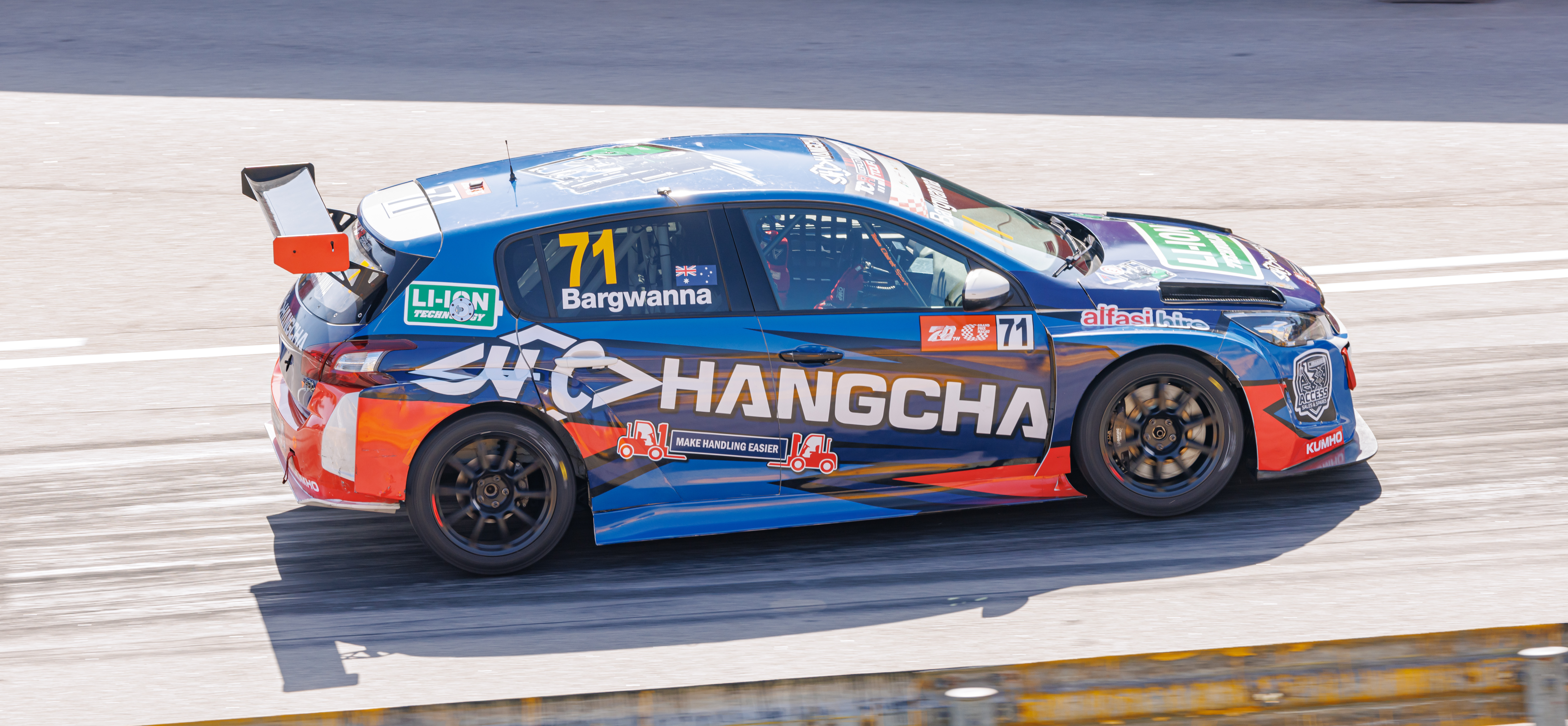
- Bargwanna during the 2023 Macau Guia Race
- Nationality: Australian
- Born: Benjamin Bargwanna; 10 April 2001 (age 25) Warragul, Victoria
- Relatives: Jason Bargwanna (father); Harry Bargwanna (grand father); Alf Bargwanna (great uncle); Scott Bargwanna (cousin); Jude Bargwanna (second cousin)

TCR Australia
- Years active: 2021–current
- Teams: GRM Hangcha Racing
- Starts: 77
- Wins: 3
- Podiums: 11
- Poles: 3
- Fastest laps: 0
- Best finish: 7th in 2023 & 2024

Championship titles
- 2018: Victorian Hyundai Excel Series

Awards
- 2021: TCR Australia Rookie of the year

Benjamin Bargwanna (born 10 April 2001 in Warragul) is a racing driver from Australia. He is the son of Bathurst 1000 winner Jason Bargwanna and grandson to Australian Production Car Champion Harry Bargwanna.

== Junior career ==
Bargwanna started in karts as a child finishing second in the Victorian Karting Championship KA3 Junior class before moving into various Hyundai Excel series in 2016. In 2017, he finished third in the Hyundai Excel Nations and in 2018 won the Victorian Series.

In 2019, Bargwanna moved to Formula Ford driving a Spectrum to second in the Victorian Formula Ford Championship. In 2020, he again raced in the Victorian Formula Ford Championship and was leading the point score when the season was cancelled due to COVID-19 restrictions.

== TCR Australia ==
In 2021, Bargwanna joined his father Jason Bargwanna in the TCR Australia Touring Car Series driving a Peugeot 308. That year, he took the 'Rookie of the Year' award and finished tenth in the standings. 2022 he again raced a Peugeot 308, again finishing tenth and winning his first race at Sandown Raceway.

For 2023, Bargwanna again did the whole Australia series along with six rounds of the TCR World Tour in the aging Peugeot 308. He finished seventh in the Australian Series with a pole position and three podiums his highlights.

== S5000 ==
Bargwanna had his first taste of the S5000 at the first round of the 2021 S5000 Tasman Series running in the top ten. His next race was at the Australian Grand Prix support round in the 2022 S5000 Australian Drivers' Championship again running in the top ten. His first full season was in the 2022 S5000 Tasman Series where he finished on the podium in race two and ended up fifth in the championship.

In 2023 he joined the series for the final three rounds and the S5000 Tasman Series finishing third in points for the Tasman Series.

== Racing record ==
=== Karting career summary ===
Season	Series	Position
2015	Australian Kart Championships - KA Junior	41st
2015	Victorian Kart Championships - Junior National Light	9th
2016	Victorian Kart Championships - KA3 Junior	2nd
2016	Golden Power Series - KA3 Junior	6th
2016	City of Melbourne Titles - KA3 Junior	5th

=== Racing career summary ===
Season	Series	Team	Races	Wins	Poles	F/Laps	Podiums	Points	Position
2016	Victorian Hyundai Excel Championship	Bargwanna Motorsport	3	0	0	0	0	0	NC
2017	Victorian Hyundai Excel Championship	Bargwanna Motorsport	11	0	0	0	1	135	11th
2017	Series X3 New South Wales	Bargwanna Motorsport	10	0	0	2	6	128	30th
2017	Australian Hyundai Excel Nationals	Bargwanna Motorsport	3	0	0	0	3	N/A	3rd
2018	Victorian Hyundai Excel Championship	Bargwanna Motorsport	11	0	0	1	7	299	1st
2018	Series X3 New South Wales	Bargwanna Motorsport	3	3	1	2	3	250	19th
2019	Australian Formula Ford Series	Bargwanna Motorsport	12	0	0	0	1	?	?
2019	Victorian Formula Ford Championship	Bargwanna Motorsport	15	0	0	2	6	349	2nd
2019	Formula Ford Fiesta New South Wales	Bargwanna Motorsport	6	0	0	0	0	65	13th
2020	Victorian Formula Ford Championship	Bargwanna Motorsport	3	3	0	2	3	100	1st †
2021	TCR Australia Touring Car Series	Burson Auto Parts Racing	15	0	1	0	1	333	10th
2021	Supercheap Auto TCR Baskerville Invitational	Burson Auto Parts Racing	4	1	0	0	2	118	4th
2021	S5000 Tasman Series	Garry Rogers Motorsport	3	0	0	0	0	35	12th
2022	TCR Australia Touring Car Series	Burson Auto Parts Racing	20	1	0	0	4	535	11th
2022	S5000 Australian Drivers' Championship	Valvoline Garry Rogers Motorsport	3	0	0	0	0	42	15th
2022	S5000 Tasman Series	Bargwanna Motorsport	6	0	0	0	1	154	5th
2023	TCR Australia Touring Car Series	Burson Auto Parts Racing	21	0	1	0	3	602	7th
2023	TCR World Tour	Burson Auto Parts Racing	6	0	1	0	0	35	17th
2023	TCR World Tour	Team Clairet Sport	6	0	0	0	0	35	17th
2023	TCR Europe Touring Car Series	Team Clairet Sport	4	0	0	0	0	55	17th
2023	S5000 Australian Drivers' Championship	Bargwanna Motorsport	9	0	0	0	2	224	8th
2023	S5000 Tasman Series	Bargwanna Motorsport	3	0	0	0	2	86	3rd
2024	TCR Australia Touring Car Series	GRM Hangcha Racing	21	2	0	1	3	623	7th
2025	Australian National Trans Am Series	Bargwanna Motorsport	18	0	0	0	0	175	12th
2026	Australian National Trans Am Series	Bargwanna Motorsport	21	0	0	0	0	248	5th

† Championship cancelled after 3 races due to COVID-19 pandemic.

=== Complete S5000 results ===
Year	Series	Team	1	2	3	4	5	6	7	8	9	10	11	12	13	14	15	16	17	18	Position	Points
2021	Tasman	Garry Rogers Motorsport	SMP; R1; 9	SMP; R2; 10	SMP; R3; 10	BAT; R4	BAT; R5	BAT; R6	BAT; R7; C												12th	35
2022	Australian	Garry Rogers Motorsport	SYM; R1	SYM; R2	SYM; R3	PHI; R4	PHI; R5	PHI; R6	MEL; R7; 9	MEL; R8; 9	MEL; R9; 9	SMP; R10	SMP; R11	SMP; R12	HID; R13	HID; R14	HID; R15				15th	42
2022	Tasman	Bargwanna Motorsport	SUR; R1; 4	SUR; R2; 3	SUR; R3; 4	ADL; R4; 6	ADL; R5; 5	ADL; R6; 8													5th	154
2023	Australian	Bargwanna Motorsport	SYM; R1	SYM; R2	SYM; R3	PHI; R4	PHI; R5	PHI; R6	WIN; R7	WIN; R8	WIN; R9	SMP; R10; 4	SMP; R11; 4	SMP; R12; 4	BEN; R13; 6	BEN; R14; 6	BEN; R15; 5	ADL; R16; 4	ADL; R17; 3	ADL; R18; 3	8th	224

=== TCR Australia results ===
Year	Team	Car	1	2	3	4	5	6	7	8	9	10	11	12	13	14	15	16	17	18	19	20	21	Position	Points
2021	Burson Auto Parts Racing	Peugeot 308 TCR	SYM; R1; 13	SYM; R2; 10	SYM; R3; 14	PHI; R4; 8	PHI; R5; 9	PHI; R6; 6	BAT; R7; 12	BAT; R8; 12	BAT; R9; 17	SMP; R10; 21	SMP; R11; 9	SMP; R12; 8	BAT; R13; 2	BAT; R14; Ret	BAT; R15; 12							10th	333
2022	Burson Auto Parts Racing	Peugeot 308 TCR	SYM; R1; 13	SYM; R2; 10	SYM; R3; Ret	PHI; R4; 10	PHI; R5; 2	PHI; R6; 3	BAT; R7; 2	BAT; R8; 7	BAT; R9; 6	SMP; R10; 19	SMP; R11; 19	SMP; R12; 8	QLD; R13; Ret	QLD; R14; 12	QLD; R15; 12	SAN; R16; 10	SAN; R17; 1	SAN; R18; 5	BAT; R19; 5	BAT; R20; C	BAT; R21; Ret	10th	329
2023	Burson Auto Parts Racing	Peugeot 308 TCR	SYM; R1; 4	SYM; R2; Ret	SYM; R3; 8	PHI; R4; 5	PHI; R5; 3	PHI; R6; 3	WIN; R7; 7	WIN; R8; 9	WIN; R9; 9	QLD; R13; 6	QLD; R14; 8	QLD; R15; 9	SAN; R16; 6	SAN; R17; 6	SAN; R18; 6	SMP; R19; 18	SMP; R20; Ret	SMP; R21; Ret	BAT; R22; Ret	BAT; R23; 12	BAT; R24; 10	7th	602
2024	GRM Hangcha Racing	Peugeot 308 TCR	SAN; R1; 1	SAN; R2; 7	SAN; R3; 1	SYM; R4; 5	SYM; R5; 4	SYM; R6; 9	PHI; R7; 4	PHI; R8; 5	PHI; R9; 2	BND; R10; 10	BND; R11; 7	BND; R12; 9	QLD; R13; 7	QLD; R14; 12	QLD; R15; 8							7th	623
2024	GRM Hangcha Racing	Peugeot 308 P51 TCR																SMP; R19; 9	SMP; R20; 6	SMP; R21; 7	BAT; R22; 8	BAT; R23; Ret	BAT; R24; 8	7th	623

* Season still in progress.

=== TCR Europe results ===
Year	Team	Car	1	2	3	4	5	6	7	8	9	10	11	12	13	14	Position	Points
2023	Team Clairet Sport - Burson Auto Parts Racing	Peugeot 308 TCR	ALG; R1; 17	ALG; R2; 12	PAU; R3	PAU; R4	SPA; R4; Ret	SPA; R6; 17	HUN; R7	HUN; R8	CPR; R9	CPR; R10	MNZ; R11	MNZ; R12	BAR; R13	BAR; R14	17th	55

=== TCR World Tour results ===
Year	Team	Car	1	2	3	4	5	6	7	8	9	10	11	12	13	14	15	16	17	18	19	20	Position	Points
2023	Team Clairet Sport	Peugeot 308 TCR	ALG; R1; 17	ALG; R2; 12	SPA; R3; Ret	SPA; R4; 17	VAL; R5	VAL; R6	HUN; R7	HUN; R8	VBF; R9	VBF; R10	JCB; R11	JCB; R12							MAC; R19; 12	MAC; R20; Ret	17th	35
2023	Garry Rogers Motorsport	Peugeot 308 TCR													SMP; R13; 18	SMP; R14; NC	SMP; R15; NC	BAT; R16; Ret	BAT; R17; 12	BAT; R18; 11			17th	35

=== Australian TransAm Series results ===
Year	Car	1	2	3	4	5	6	7	8	9	10	11	12	13	14	15	16	17	18	19	20	21	Position	Points
2025	Ford Mustang	SYM; R1; 16	SYM; R2; 11	SYM; R3; 9	SYM; R4; 5	BAT; R1; 10	BAT; R2; 5	HID; R1; 13	HID; R2; 7	HID; R3; 7	SAN; R1; 8	SAN; R2; Ret	SAN; R3; 7	BEN; R1; 16	BEN; R2; 11	BEN; R3; 21	MAL; R1; 13	MAL; R2; 16	MAL; R3; 12	ADE; R1; 11	ADE; R2; 8	ADE; R3; 12	12th	190
2026	Ford Mustang	BAT; R1; 5	BAT; R2; 6	BAT; R3; 4	HID; R1; 8	HID; R2; Ret	HID; R3; 9	WAN; R1; 8	WAN; R2; 8	WAN; R3; 7	QLD; R1; 9	QLD; R2; 5	QLD; R3; Ret	BEN; R1; 7	BEN; R2; 9	BEN; R3; 5	SAN; R1; 5	SAN; R2; 6	SAN; R3; 4	SAN; R4; 8	SAN; R5; 8	SAN; R6; 6	5th	248

=== Complete Bathurst 6 Hour results ===
Year	Team	Co-drivers	Car	Class	Laps	Pos.	Class pos.
2021	(Australia) Bargwanna Motorsport	(Australia) Jude Bargwanna	Volkswagen Golf Mk5 GTI	D	116	19th	2nd
2022	(Australia) Bargwanna Motorsport	(Australia) Jude Bargwanna	Audi TT RS	A1	127	9th	2nd
2023	(Australia) Bargwanna Motorsport	(Australia) Jude Bargwanna	Audi TT RS	A1	87	DNF	

Sporting positions
Preceded by Nathan Blight	Victorian Hyundai Excel Series; Champion; 2018	Succeeded by Ben Grice
