= Josh Buchan =

Australian racing driver

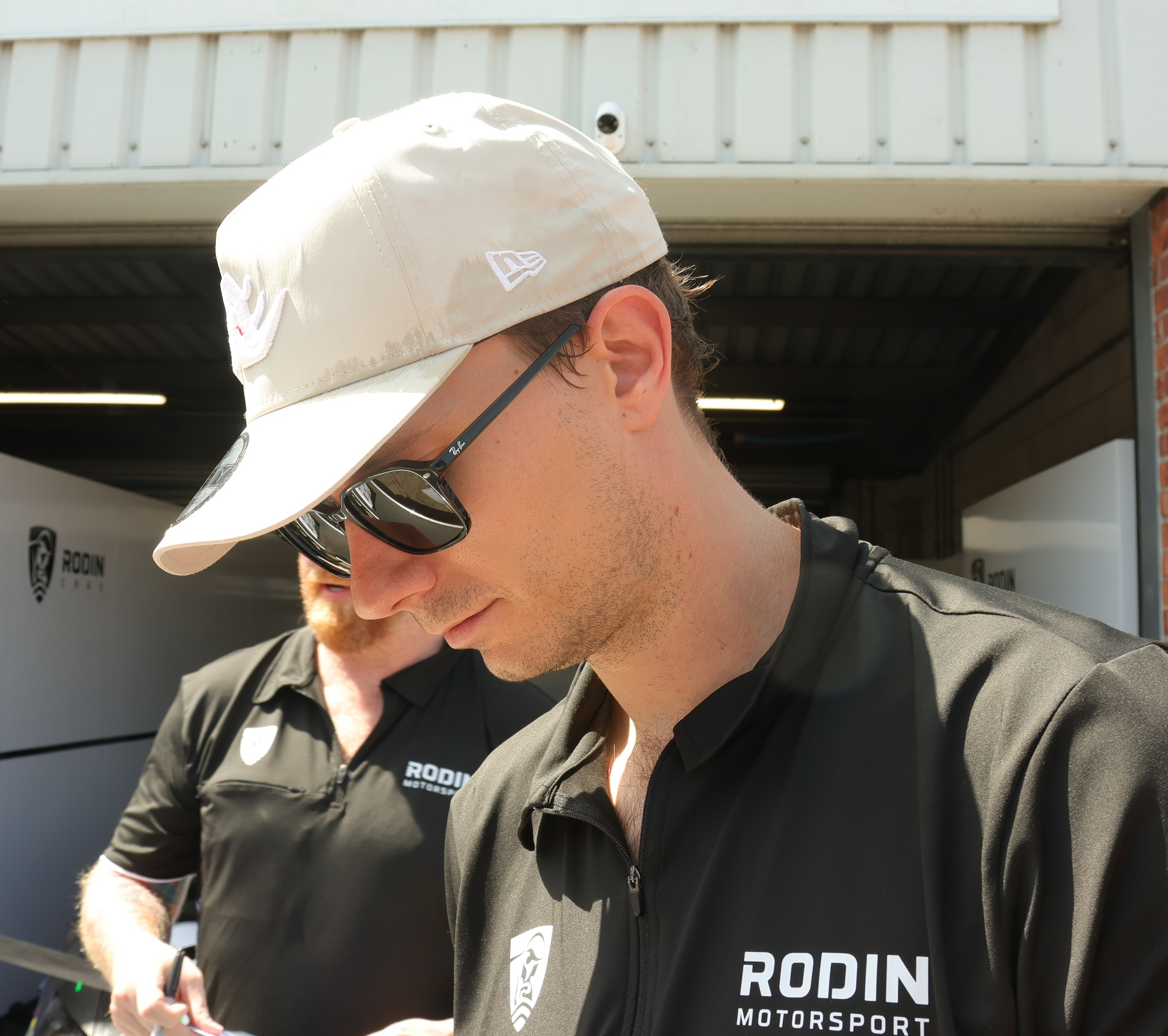
- Buchan in 2026
- Nationality: (Australia) Australian
- Born: Joshua Buchan; 22 January 1995 (age 31) Lithgow, New South Wales

TCR Australia career
- Debut season: 2021
- Current team: HMO Customer Racing
- Categorisation: FIA Silver
- Car number: 18
- Starts: 81
- Championships: 3
- Wins: 12
- Podiums: 35
- Poles: 4
- Fastest laps: 14
- Best finish: 1st in 2023, 2024 & 2025
- Finished last season: 1st

Previous series
- 2018-19 2019 2021-25 2023,25 2024-25 2025-26 2026 2026: NSW Formula Ford; Australian Formula 3 TCR Australia; TCR World Tour; GT4 Australia; GT World Chall. Aus. British GT3; IMSA Michelin Pilot Chall.

Championship titles
- 2023,24,25 2018: TCR Australia; NSW Formula Ford

Joshua Buchan (born 22 January 1995) is an Australian racing driver who currently competes in various TCR Touring Car series worldwide as a factory Hyundai driver and also the GT World Challenge Australia. Buchan won the 2023, 2024 and 2025 TCR Australia Touring Car Series championships.

== Career ==
Buchan had a late start to racing, beginning karting in 2011 just before his 16th birthday. He participated in karting until 2017, when he moved up to competition in Formula Fords. Buchan won the 2018 New South Wales Formula Ford championship, winning 17 out of 19 races during the season. In 2019, he took victory in the Formula Ford 50th Anniversary event at Mount Panorama, earning him a scholarship to move up to the Australian Formula 3 championship, where he finished second in points. Plans were made for Buchan to move the S5000 championship for 2020, but the season was cancelled due to the COVID-19 pandemic.

Buchan signed to race in the TCR Australia Touring Car Series in 2021, driving for HMO Customer Racing. Buchan finished seventh in the championship in his first season. In 2022, he finished third in the championship standings, and in 2023, he won the championship over his teammate Bailey Sweeney.

In 2024, Buchan signed a two-year deal to continue driving for HMO Customer Racing.

== Personal life ==
Buchan was born and raised in Lithgow, New South Wales. He currently resides in Sydney, New South Wales.

== Racing record ==
=== Karting career summary ===
Season	Series	Position
2011	Clyde Marshall Memorial Trophy - Juniors	**1st**
2012	Clyde Marshall Memorial Trophy - National Light	**2nd**
2017	Combined Districts Kart Club - Junior Championship	**1st**
2017	Combined Districts Kart Club - KA4 Junior Light	**1st**
2017	Clyde Marshall Memorial Trophy - KA4 Junior Light	**3rd**
2017	Race of Stars - KA3 Junior	13th
2018	Combined Districts Kart Club - KA3 Senior Light	**1st**
2018	Combined Districts Kart Club - Senior Champion	**1st**
2018	SP Tools Club Driver Rankings - KA4 Senior Light	**2nd**
2018	Clyde Marshall Memorial Trophy - KA3 Junior Light	**1st**
2019	Race of Stars - KA3 Senior	13th
2019	Brian Farley Memorial - TAG Light	15th
2020	Australian Kart Championship - TAG 125	17th
2022	Nicole & Rod Franks Memorial - TAG 125	12th
Source: 1 2

=== Racing career summary ===
Season	Series	Team	Races	Wins	Poles	F/Laps	Podiums	Points	Position
2018	New South Wales Formula Ford - Kent class	Listec Racing Cars	9	8	1	7	9	302	**1st**
2018	Australian Formula Ford Series - Kent class	Listec Racing Cars	3	3	1	3	3	61	5th
2019	Australian Formula 3 Championship	Gilmour Racing	18	0	1	1	16	177	**2nd**
2019	New South Wales Formula Ford - Kent class	Listec Racing Cars	3	3	1	3	3	94	10th
2021	TCR Australia Touring Car Series	HMO Customer Racing	15	2	0	2	4	365	7th
2022	TCR Australia Touring Car Series	HMO Customer Racing	20	1	1	3	6	667	**3rd**
2023	TCR Australia Touring Car Series	HMO Customer Racing	21	2	1	4	8	807	**1st**
2023	TCR World Tour	HMO Customer Racing	6	0	0	1	0	58	16th
2024	TCR Australia Touring Car Series	HMO Customer Racing	21	3	2	3	14	747	**1st**
2024	GT4 Australia Series	Zagame Autosport	5	1	1	2	2	99	4th
2025	GT4 Australia Series - Silver-Am	Zagame Autosport	2	0	0	0	0	18	13th
2025	GT World Challenge Australia - Pro-Am	Zagame Autosport	2	0	0	0	0	0	27th
2025	TCR World Tour	HMO Customer Racing	7	2	0	0	2	154	11th
2025	TCR Australia Touring Car Series	HMO Customer Racing	4	1	0	0	1	186	**1st**
2025	TCR Australia Cup	HMO Customer Racing	2	2	0	0	2	93	**1st**
2026	Michelin Pilot Challenge - TCR	Bryan Herta Autosport with PR1/Mathiasen	1	0	0	0	1	300*	31st*
2026	British GT3 Championship - Silver-Am	Rodin Motorsport	7	1	1	0	2	91	5th
2026	GT World Challenge Australia - Pro-Am	Zagame Autosport	10	0	1	1	1	52*	12th*
2026	OzTrack Super TT - ExtremeTT class	HMO Customer Racing	3	3	1	2	3	46*	**2nd***

=== Complete Australian Formula 3 ===
(key) (Races in bold indicate pole position) (Races in italics indicate fastest lap)

Year	Team	1	2	3	4	5	6	7	8	9	10	11	12	13	14	15	16	17	18	19	Pos	Points
2019	Gilmour Racing	Dallara F311-Mercedes	WIN; 1; 2	WIN; 2 Ret	WIN; 3; 2	MOR; 1; 3	MOR; 2; 3	MOR; 3; 3	BEN; 1 Ret	BEN; 2; 2	BEN; 3; 2	SYD; 1; 2	SYD; 2; 2	SYD; 3; 2	**WAK**; **1**; **2**	WAK; 2; 2	WAK; 3; 2	QLD; 1; 2	QLD; 2; 2	QLD; 3; 2	2nd	177

=== Complete TCR Australia results ===
Year	Team	Car	1	2	3	4	5	6	7	8	9	10	11	12	13	14	15	16	17	18	19	20	21	Position	Points
2021	HMO Customer Racing	Hyundai i30 N TCR	SYM; R1; 3	SYM; R2; 6	SYM; R3; 6	PHI; R4; 13	PHI; R5; Ret	PHI; R6; 9	BAT; R7; 14	BAT; R8; 11	BAT; R9; 10	SMP; R10; 1	SMP; R11; 1	SMP; R12; 2	BAT; R13; DNS	BAT; R14; Ret	BAT; R15; 10							7th	365
2022	HMO Customer Racing	Hyundai i30 N TCR	SYM; R1; 2	SYM; R2; 5	SYM; R3; 4	PHI; R4; Ret	PHI; R5; 19	PHI; R6; 14	BAT; R7; 8	BAT; R8; 3	BAT; R9; 4	**SMP**; **R10**; **1**	SMP; R11; 11	SMP; R12; 2	QLD; R13; 14	QLD; R14; 9	QLD; R15; 8	SAN; R16; 5	SAN; R17; 8	SAN; R18; 4				3rd	667
2022	HMO Customer Racing	Hyundai Elantra N TCR																			BAT; R19; 9	BAT; R20; C	BAT; R21; 3	3rd	667
2023	HMO Customer Racing	Hyundai Elantra N TCR	SYM; R1; 6	SYM; R2; 9	SYM; R3; 9	**PHI**; **R4**; **1**	PHI; R5; 10	PHI; R6; 1	WIN; R7; 4	WIN; R8; 3	WIN; R9; 2	QLD; R13; 5	QLD; R14; 6	QLD; R15; 6	SAN; R16; 8	SAN; R17; 5	SAN; R18; 7	SMP; R19; 16	SMP; R20; 5	SMP; R21; 5	BAT; R22; 8	BAT; R23; 11	BAT; R24; 11	1st	809
2024	HMO Customer Racing	Hyundai i30 N TCR	**SAN**; **R1**; **2**	SAN; R2; 6	SAN; R3; 2	SYM; R4; 2	SYM; R5; 6	SYM; R6; 11	PHI; R7; 1	PHI; R8; Ret	PHI; R9; 3													1st	747
2024	HMO Customer Racing	Hyundai Elantra N TCR										BND; R10; 3	BND; R11; 3	BND; R12; 2	QLD; R13; 6	QLD; R14; 3	QLD; R15; 3	**SMP**; **R19**; **1**	SMP; R20; 3	SMP; R21; 1	BAT; R22; 3	BAT; R23; 6	BAT; R24; 6	1st	747
2025	HMO Customer Racing	Hyundai Elantra N TCR	BND; R1; C	BND; R2; 4^{4}	BND; R3; 5	MAC; R4; 7	MAC; R5; 1																	1st	186

* Season still in progress

=== Complete TCR World Tour results ===
Year	Team	Car	1	2	3	4	5	6	7	8	9	10	11	12	13	14	15	16	17	18	19	20	21	Position	Points
2023	HMO Customer Racing	Hyundai Elantra N TCR	ALG; R1	ALG; R2	SPA; R3	SPA; R4	VAL; R5	VAL; R6	HUN; R7	HUN; R8	VBF; R9	VBF; R10	JCB; R11	JCB; R12	SMP; R13; 16	SMP; R14; 5	SMP; R15; 5	BAT; R16; 8	BAT; R17; 11	BAT; R18; 11	MAC; R19	MAC; R20		16th	58
2025	HMO Customer Racing	Hyundai Elantra N TCR	AHR; 1	AHR; 2	AHR; 3	CRT; 1	CRT; 2	CRT; 3	MNZ; 1	MNZ; 2	CVR; 1	CVR; 2	BEN; 1 C	BEN; 2; 4^{4}	BEN; 3; 5	INJ; 1; 1^{2}	INJ; 2; 9	INJ; 3; 6	ZHZ; 1	ZHZ; 2	ZHZ; 3	MAC; 1; 7	MAC; 2; 1	11th	154

=== Complete Australian GT4 results ===
(key) (Races in bold indicate pole position) (Races in italics indicate fastest lap)

Year	Team	Car	Class	1	2	3	4	5	6	7	8	9	10	11	12	Pos	Points
2024	Zagame Autosport	McLaren Artura GT4	Pro-Am	PHI; 1; 9	PHI; 2 DNS	**BEN**; **1**; **6**	BEN; 2; 6	QLD; 1	QLD; 2	PHI; 1	PHI; 2	SYD; 1; 8	SYD; 2; 2	BAT; 1	BAT; 2	4th	111
2025	Zagame Autosport	McLaren Artura GT4	Silver-Am	PHI; 1; 12	PHI; 2; 13	SYD; 1	SYD; 2	QLD; 1	QLD; 2	PHI; 1	PHI; 2	BEN; 1	BEN; 2	HMP; 1	HMP; 2	12th	18

=== Complete Bathurst 12 Hour results ===
Year	Team	Co-drivers	Car	Class	Laps	Pos.	Class pos.
2025	(Australia) Method Motorsport	(Australia) Jake Santalucia (Australia) Anthony Levitt	McLaren Artura GT4	GT4	276	14th	**1st**

=== Complete GT World Challenge Australia results ===
(key) (Races in bold indicate pole position) (Races in italics indicate fastest lap)

Year	Team	Car	Class	1	2	3	4	5	6	7	8	9	10	11	12	Pos	Points
2025	Zagame Autosport	Ferrari 296 GT3	Pro-Am	PHI; 1	PHI; 2	SYD; 1	SYD; 2	QLD; 1	QLD; 2	PHI; 1	PHI; 2	BEN; 1	BEN; 2	HMP; 1; 10	HMP; 2; 8	NC †	-
2026	Zagame Autosport	Ferrari 296 GT3	Pro-Am	PHI; 1; 10	PHI; 2; 5	BEN; 1; 10	BEN; 2; 11	QLD; 1; 6	QLD; 2; 11	HID; 1; 5	**HID**; **2**; **3**	SYD; 1; 9	SYD; 2; 10	ADL; 1	ADL; 2	12th*	52*

† Guest drivers ineligible to score points

=== Complete British GT Championship results ===
(key) (Races in bold indicate pole position) (Races in italics indicate fastest lap)

Year	Team	Car	Class	1	2	3	4	5	6	7	8	Pos	Points
2026	Rodin Motorsport	Ferrari 296 GT3	Silver-Am	SIL; Ret	OUL; 6	OUL; 5	SPA; 5	SNT; 3	**SNT**; **1**	DON; 4	BHT	5th	91

=== Complete Daytona 4 Hour results ===
Year	Team	Co-drivers	Car	Class	Laps	Pos.	Class pos.
2026	(United States) Bryan Herta Autosport with PR1/Mathiasen	(United States) Mason Filippi (United States) Bryson Morris	Hyundai Elantra N TCR (2024)	TCR	105	27th	**3rd**

Sporting positions
Preceded by Tony D'Alberto	Winner of the TCR Australia Touring Car Series; 2023, 2024 & 2025	Succeeded by Incumbent
