= 2023 Hi-Tec Oils Bathurst 6 Hour =

Motor racing competition

The 2023 Hi-Tec Oils Bathurst 6 Hour was an endurance race for Group 3E Series Production Cars. The race was held at the Mount Panorama Circuit, Bathurst, New South Wales, Australia on 9 April 2023. It was the seventh annual Bathurst 6 Hour.

The race was won by Simon Hodges and Jayden Ojeda driving a BMW M4.

== Classes ==
Cars competed in the following classes:

| Symbol | Class |
|---|---|
| X | Ultimate Performance |
| A1 | Extreme Performance Forced Induction |
| A2 | Extreme Performance Naturally Aspirated |
| B1 | High Performance Forced Induction |
| B2 | High Performance Naturally Aspirated |
| C | Performance |
| D | Production |
| E | Compact |

== Results ==
| Pos. | Drivers | No. | Car | Sponsor | Class | Class Pos. | Laps |
| 1 | S.Hodges/J.Ojeda | 21 | BMW M4 | Secure Wealth Advisers | X | 1 | 112 |
| 2 | W.Russell/D.Russell/A.Russell | 58 | BMW M3 | Novocastrian Motorsport | X | 2 | 112 |
| 3 | A.Soole/A.Burgess/A.De Pasquale | 4 | BMW M4 | Property Investment Store | X | 3 | 112 |
| 4 | B.Kavich/M.Kavich/T.Randle | 92 | BMW M2 Competition | Yellow Pages Race For A Cure | X | 4 | 112 |
| 5 | G.Walden/M.Auld/T.Everingham | 24 | BMW M3 | Walden Motorsport | X | 5 | 112 |
| 6 | B.Lynton/T.Leahey/W.Davison | 23 | BMW M3 | Bruce Lynton Service | X | 6 | 112 |
| 7 | T.Quinn/G.Denyer/R.Quinn | 7 | Ford Mustang Mach 1 | Local Legends | A2 | 1 | 112 |
| 8 | C.Delfsma/R.Casha/R.Gray | 221 | Ford Mustang | Century 21 Hazelbrook | A2 | 2 | 112 |
| 9 | D.Campbell/C.Crick | 118 | Mitsubishi Lancer EVO | D A Campbell Transport | A1 | 1 | 112 |
| 10 | M.Sheargold/D.O'Keeffe/B.Hobson | 45 | Mercedes-AMG | RAM Motorsport | A1 | 2 | 112 |
| 11 | C.Yucel/I.Salteri/A.Sarkis | 222 | Volkswagen Golf R | Harding Performance | A1 | 3 | 112 |
| 12 | C.Lillis/N.Callaghan/M.Holt | 64 | HSV Clubsport R8 | BILSTEIN | A2 | 3 | 111 |
| 14 | T.Alford/K.Alford | 49 | Ford Mustang Mach 1 | Vision Estate | A2 | 4 | 111 |
| 15 | M.Dowsett/M.Maddren/L.Bloxsom | 11 | Toyota 86 | Lone Star 11 Racing | D | 1 | 110 |
| 16 | B.Edwards/C.McKay/B.McDonald | 73 | Holden Commodore SSV 6.0 | Cable Source/Sunyeh/Singo's Meats | B2 | 1 | 109 |
| 17 | H.Inwood/G.Inwood/T.Colombrita | 143 | Subaru WRX STi | A1 Towing | B1 | 1 | 109 |
| 18 | E.Kreamer/S.Thompson/M.King | 57 | Mitsubishi Lancer EVO | Hire Express | A1 | 4 | 107 |
| 19 | J.Bowe/A.McGill | 33 | FPV GT-F | Ranger | A1 | 5 | 106 |
| 20 | H.Clark/S.Aho | 39 | Subaru BRZ TS STI | MDR Motorsport | D | 2 | 106 |
| 21 | K.Buccini/E.Best/C.Prince | 999 | BMW 135i | Team Buccini Racing | B1 | 2 | 106 |
| 22 | B.Giblin/N.McLeod | 10 | HSV VXR | RM Racing Cars | C | 1 | 106 |
| 23 | B.Wilkinson/C.O'Brien | 26 | BMW M135 | Infinium Advisory | A1 | 6 | 105 |
| 24 | A.McMaster/D.Worrell/T.Robson | 62 | BMW 125i | Mad Macks Racing | D | 3 | 105 |
| 25 | J.Hay/P.Ansell/M.Learoyd | 84 | Volkswagen Scirocco | AC Store/CP Dental/Performax | C | 2 | 105 |
| 26 | J.Fitzgerald/P.Johnston/A.Zerefos | 47 | BMW 130i | MilkLab/OnTrack | C | 3 | 105 |
| 27 | R.Shaw/D.Cox/T.Shaw | 80 | Mazda RX-8 | RX8 Cup | D | 4 | 105 |
| 28 | C.Osborne/J.Robotham | 13 | Renault Megane RS 26 | Osborne Motorsport | C | 4 | 104 |
| 29 | D.Leslight/H.Leslight | 75 | Volkswagen Golf GTi | Surfside Properties | D | 5 | 104 |
| 30 | A.Jackman/C.Beller/M.Taubitz | 2 | Mazda 3 SP25 | BELLER Motorsport | E | 1 | 104 |
| 31 | P.Alexander/S.Doorey/S.Fowler | 35 | Mazda 3 SP25 | Road To Bathurst | E | 2 | 104 |
| 32 | J.Muggleton/O.Butt/T.Derwent | 78 | HSV VXR | PB Motorsport Services | C | 5 | 103 |
| 33 | P.Buccini/M.von Rappard/B.Paine | 171 | BMW 140i | Team Buccini Racing | A1 | 7 | 99 |
| 34 | H.Morrall/T.Mecklem | 9 | Mitsubishi Lancer EVO | Parramatta Vehicle Services | A1 | 8 | 87 |
| 35 | P.Navin/N.Halstead | 77 | Volkswagen Scirocco | Iolar/MRPS/AED Group | C | 6 | 85 |
| 36 | C.Heiniger/D.Flanagan/D.Chapman | 86 | Toyota 86 GTS | Heiniger Joinery/5th Gear Motorsport | D | 6 | 84 |
| DNF | D.West/T.D’Alberto | 90 | HSV GTS | Kelair / DWE | X | | 111 |
| DNF | C.Cowham/L.Kearns | 25 | Ford Mustang GT | CK Motorsport | A2 | | 108 |
| DNF | P.Loiacono/A.Holzl/D.Holzl | 14 | Mitsubishi Lancer EVO | Forklogic Access & Forklift Hire | A1 | | 108 |
| DNF | C.Holdt/D.Ling/D.Jenkins | 51 | HSV VXR | Lithostone Surfaces/LaRocca Marble | C | | 106 |
| DNF | J.Walsh/A.Letcher/N.Agar | 121 | Honda Integra Type R | Conroy Motorsport | D | | 90 |
| DNF | B.Bargwanna/J.Bargwanna | 71 | Audi TTRS Plus | | A1 | | 87 |
| DNF | J.Camilleri/S.Nicholas | 36 | Mazda 3 MPS | Grand Prix Mazda Caboolture | C | | 86 |
| DNF | P.Razum/D.Forrest | 29 | HSV ClubSport | Boronia Towbars | A2 | | 84 |
| DNF | G.Sherrin/I.Sherrin | 27 | BMW M4 | Sherrin Rentals | X | | 73 |
| DNF | S.Gore/K.Bensley/S.Owen | 48 | Lexus RC F | ASAP Marketing | A2 | | 71 |
| DNF | J.Elliot/B.Cole/M.Ferns | 42 | Holden Commodore SSV 6.0 | B&M Consulting/Cougar Powder Coating | B2 | | 61 |
| DNF | A.McConchie/K.Mackie/J.Parmenter | 81 | Mazda RX-8 | RX8 Cup | D | | 55 |
| DNF | K.Begg/D.Russell/R.Gooley | 40 | BMW M4 | SpeedCafe | X | | 52 |
| DNF | M.Chahda/M.Harris | 28 | BMW 335i | Spinifex Recruiting | B1 | | 40 |
| DNF | M.Ambrose/T.Brook | 95 | Ford Mustang | Miedecke Motor Group | A2 | | 39 |
| DNF | J.Sinni/J.Rice | 31 | Renault Megane RS 26 | Osborne Motorsport | C | | 39 |
| DNF | D.Agathos/B.Wilson | 66 | Subaru WRX STi | Nova Employment/Full Gas Racing | A1 | | 38 |
| DNF | G.Beggs/C.Sharples | 41 | HSV Clubsport R8 | | A2 | | 38 |
| DNF | T.McLennan/R.Salmon | 19 | Mercedes-AMG A45 | Daimler Trucks Brisbane | A1 | | 36 |
| DNF | Jason Gomersall | 30 | Ford Mustang | Gomersall Motorsport | A2 | | 30 |
| DNF | J.Keene/R.Luff | 50 | MINI Cooper S JCW | MWM Racing | C | | 28 |
| DNF | Amar Sharma | 43 | HSV VXR | Champ Group | C | | 21 |
| DNF | Anthony Levitt | 16 | Mercedes-AMG W204 C63 | Levitt Motorsports | A2 | | 11 |
| DSQ | S.Turner/J.Cox/R.Rubis | 96 | BMW 135i | Fierce Racing | B1 | | 111 |
