= 2021 TCR Australia Touring Car Series =

Australian motor racing competition

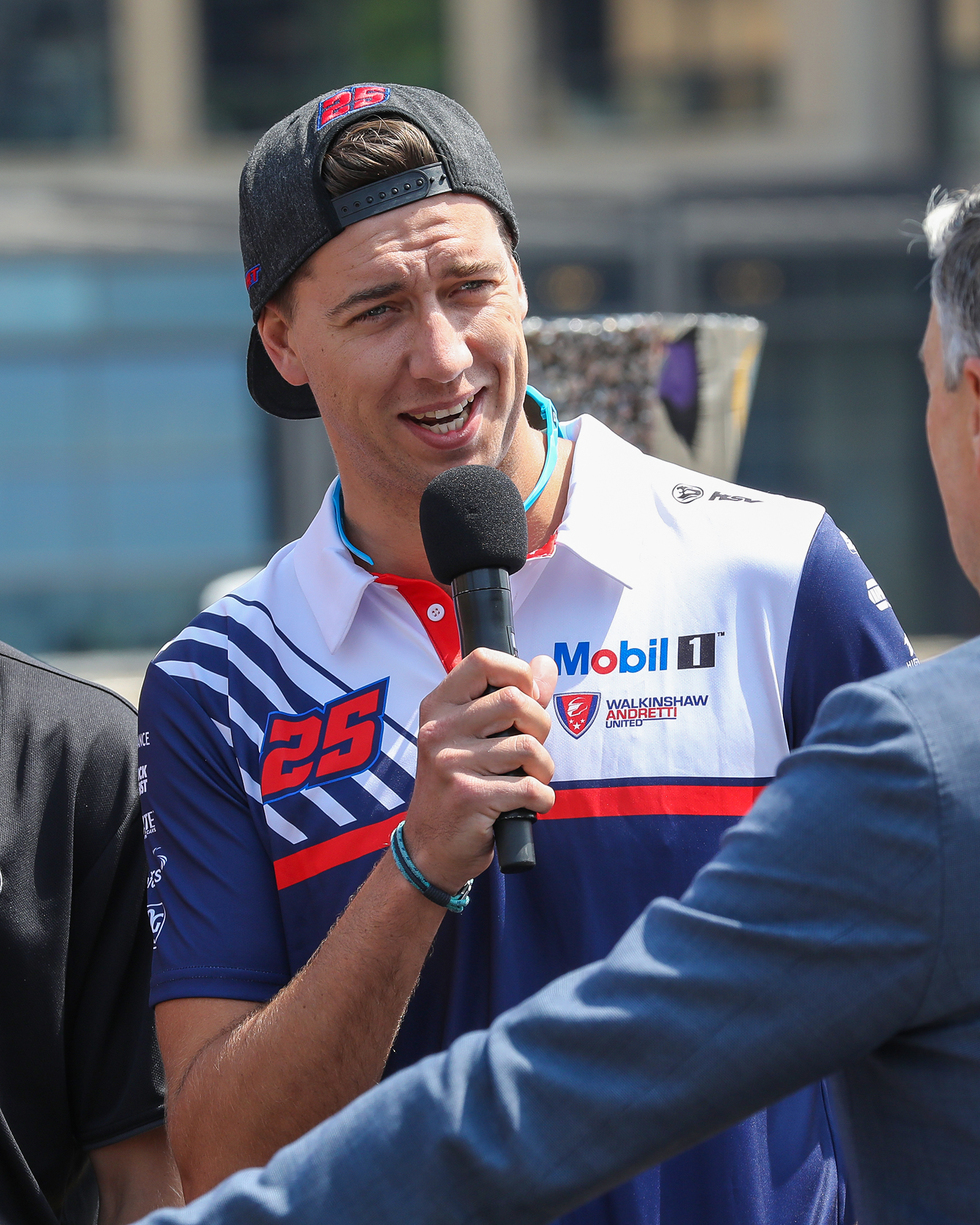
Chaz Mostert won his first TCR championship

The 2021 TCR Australia Series (known for sponsorship reasons as the 2021 Supercheap Auto TCR Australia Series) was an Australian motor racing competition for TCR Touring Cars. It was the second TCR Australia Touring Car Series. The series was sanctioned by Motorsport Australia as a National Series with the Australian Racing Group Pty Ltd appointed as the Category Manager. It was contested as part of the renamed Motorsport Australia Championships series.

The series was won by Chaz Mostert driving an Audi RS 3 LMS TCR.

== Race calendar ==
The calendar was announced on 23 November 2020 with seven confirmed rounds.

Round	Circuit	Location	Date
1	(Tasmania) Symmons Plains Raceway	Launceston, Tasmania	24–26 January
2	(Victoria (state)) Phillip Island Grand Prix Circuit	Phillip Island, Victoria	12–14 March^{1}
3	(New South Wales) Mount Panorama Circuit	Bathurst, New South Wales	2–4 April
4	(New South Wales) Sydney Motorsport Park	Eastern Creek, New South Wales	1–2 May
5	(New South Wales) Mount Panorama Circuit	Bathurst, New South Wales	30 November–5 December

^1 – The Phillip Island round was postponed to 12−14 March from its original February 18-21 date after a snap lockdown was enacted in response to an outbreak of COVID-19 cases in Melbourne.

== Teams and drivers ==
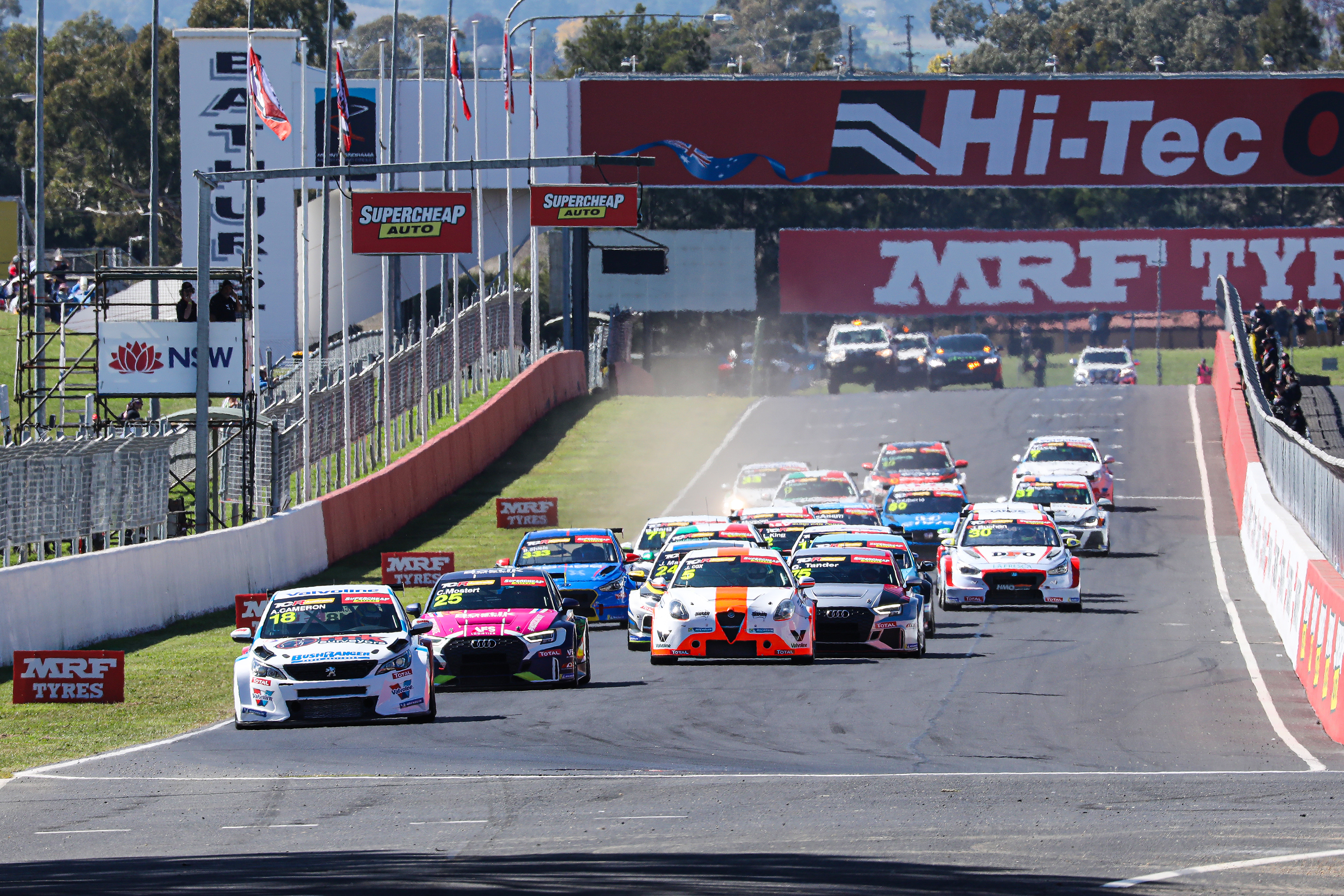
The start of Race 3 during the third round at Mount Panorama. Aaron Cameron leads from Chaz Mostert and Jordan Cox.

The following teams and drivers are under contract to compete in the 2021 series:

Team	Car	No.	Drivers	Rounds	Ref.
(Australia) Melbourne Performance Centre	Audi RS 3 LMS TCR	2	(Australia) Luke King	All	
(Australia) Melbourne Performance Centre	Audi RS 3 LMS TCR	25	(Australia) Chaz Mostert	All	
(Australia) Melbourne Performance Centre	Audi RS 3 LMS TCR	75	(Australia) Garth Tander	3	
(Australia) Melbourne Performance Centre	Audi RS 3 LMS TCR	75	(Germany) Christopher Mies	5	
(Australia) Melbourne Performance Centre	Alfa Romeo Giulietta Veloce TCR	9	(Australia) Jay Hanson	5	
(Australia) Melbourne Performance Centre	Volkswagen Golf GTI TCR	14	(Australia) Lachlan Mineeff	2, 4	
(Australia) Melbourne Performance Centre	Volkswagen Golf GTI TCR	37	(Australia) Chelsea Angelo	2–4	
(Australia) Garry Rogers Motorsport	Alfa Romeo Giulietta Veloce TCR	5	(Australia) Jordan Cox	All	
(Australia) GRM Team Valvoline	Alfa Romeo Giulietta Veloce TCR	7	(Australia) Michael Caruso	1–3	
(Australia) GRM Team Valvoline	Alfa Romeo Giulietta Veloce TCR	150	(Australia) Michael Caruso	4–5	
(Australia) GRM Team Valvoline	Peugeot 308 TCR	18	(Australia) Aaron Cameron	1–3	
(Australia) GRM Team Valvoline	Peugeot 308 TCR	155	(Australia) Aaron Cameron	4–5	
(Australia) Ashley Seward Motorsport	Alfa Romeo Giulietta Veloce TCR	9	(Australia) Jay Hanson	1–4	
(Australia) Ashley Seward Motorsport	Alfa Romeo Giulietta Veloce TCR	10	(Australia) Lee Holdsworth	1–4	
(Australia) HMO Customer Racing	Hyundai i30 N TCR	11	(Australia) Nathan Morcom	All	
(Australia) HMO Customer Racing	Hyundai i30 N TCR	30	(Australia) Josh Buchan	All	
(Australia) HMO Customer Racing	Hyundai i30 N TCR	130	(Australia) Duvashen Padayachee	3–4	
(Australia) Purple Sector	Volkswagen Golf GTI TCR	14	(Australia) Lachlan Mineeff	5	
(Australia) Purple Sector	Volkswagen Golf GTI TCR	78	(Australia) Keegan Brain	5	
(Australia) Michael Clemente Motorsport	Honda Civic Type R TCR (FK8)	15	(Australia) Michael Clemente	1–4	
(Australia) Burson Auto Parts Racing	Peugeot 308 TCR	17	(Australia) Jason Bargwanna	All	
(Australia) Burson Auto Parts Racing	Peugeot 308 TCR	71	(Australia) Ben Bargwanna	All	
(Australia) Wall Racing	Honda Civic Type R TCR (FK8)	24	(Australia) John Martin	All	
(Australia) Wall Racing	Honda Civic Type R TCR (FK8)	50	(Australia) Tony D'Alberto	1–4	
(Australia) Renault Sport GRM	Renault Mégane R.S TCR	33	(Australia) Dylan O'Keeffe	All	
(Australia) Renault Sport GRM	Renault Mégane R.S TCR	34	(Australia) James Moffat	All	
(Australia) LM Motorsport	Audi RS 3 LMS TCR	97	(Australia) Liam McAdam	3	
(Australia) Team Soutar Motorsport	Honda Civic Type R TCR (FK8)	110	(Australia) Zac Soutar	All	
(Australia) DashSport	Hyundai i30 N TCR	111	(Australia) Michael King	4	
(Australia) Tilton Racing	Hyundai i30 N TCR	333	(Australia) Bradley Shiels	All	

== Summary ==
Round	Race	Event	Pole position	Fastest Lap	Winning Driver	Winning Team	Report
1	1	(Tasmania) Symmons Plains Raceway	(Australia) Lee Holdsworth	(Australia) Jordan Cox	(Australia) Lee Holdsworth	Ashley Seward Motorsport	
1	2	(Tasmania) Symmons Plains Raceway		(Australia) Jordan Cox	(Australia) Jordan Cox	Garry Rogers Motorsport	
1	3	(Tasmania) Symmons Plains Raceway		(Australia) Lee Holdsworth	(Australia) Jordan Cox	Garry Rogers Motorsport	
2	1	(Victoria (state)) Phillip Island Grand Prix Circuit	(Australia) Chaz Mostert	(Australia) Chaz Mostert	(Australia) Chaz Mostert	Melbourne Performance Centre	
2	2	(Victoria (state)) Phillip Island Grand Prix Circuit		(Australia) Chaz Mostert	(Australia) Chaz Mostert	Melbourne Performance Centre	
2	3	(Victoria (state)) Phillip Island Grand Prix Circuit		(Australia) Luke King	(Australia) Jason Bargwanna	Burson Auto Parts Racing	
3	1	(New South Wales) Mount Panorama Circuit	(Australia) Chaz Mostert	(Australia) Chaz Mostert	(Australia) Chaz Mostert	Melbourne Performance Centre	
3	2	(New South Wales) Mount Panorama Circuit		(Australia) Chaz Mostert	(Australia) Chaz Mostert	Melbourne Performance Centre	
3	3	(New South Wales) Mount Panorama Circuit		(Australia) Chaz Mostert	(Australia) Chaz Mostert	Melbourne Performance Centre	
4	1	(New South Wales) Sydney Motorsport Park	(Australia) Dylan O'Keeffe	(Australia) Josh Buchan	(Australia) Josh Buchan	HMO Customer Racing	
4	2	(New South Wales) Sydney Motorsport Park		(Australia) Josh Buchan	(Australia) Josh Buchan	HMO Customer Racing	
4	3	(New South Wales) Sydney Motorsport Park		(Australia) Lee Holdsworth	(Australia) Michael Caruso	Garry Rogers Motorsport	
5	1	(New South Wales) Mount Panorama Circuit	(Australia) Ben Bargwanna	(Australia) Aaron Cameron	(Australia) Aaron Cameron	Garry Rogers Motorsport	
5	2	(New South Wales) Mount Panorama Circuit		(Australia) Jordan Cox	(Australia) Jordan Cox	Garry Rogers Motorsport	
5	3	(New South Wales) Mount Panorama Circuit		(Australia) Jordan Cox	(Australia) Jordan Cox	Garry Rogers Motorsport	

== Drivers' standings ==
Points system

Points are awarded as follows at each event. Drivers are required to finish a race in order to receive points.

Position	**1st**	**2nd**	**3rd**	**4th**	**5th**	**6th**	**7th**	**8th**	**9th**	**10th**	**11th**	**12th**	**13th**	**14th**	**15th**	**16th**	**17th**	**18th**	**19th**	**20th**	**21st**
Race 1 & 2	40	36	34	32	30	28	26	24	22	20	18	16	15	14	13	12	11	10	9	8	7
Race 3	50	46	44	42	40	38	36	34	32	30	28	26	25	24	23	22	21	20	19	18	17

- 2 points are awarded for qualifying on pole position.
- At the final round, the Race 3 points scale was also used for Race 1.

=== Standings ===
Pos.	Driver	SYM (Tasmania)			PHI (Victoria (state))			BAT1 (New South Wales)			SMP (New South Wales)			BAT2 (New South Wales)			Points
1	(Australia) Chaz Mostert	5	3	2	**1**	**1**	**18**	**1**	**1**	**1**	3	2	6	8	WD	WD	486
2	(Australia) Aaron Cameron	4	15	8	6	7	10	2	2	2	9	11	Ret	1	**2**	2	453
3	(Australia) Jordan Cox	2	1	**1**	12	Ret	DNS	9	4	3	7	Ret	7	4	1	**1**	434
4	(Australia) Luke King	6	4	4	2	2	15	8	10	13	14	7	5	6	Ret	4	426
5	(Australia) John Martin	17	14	13	4	3	4	6	5	5	11	20	12	7	7	9	402
6	(Australia) Nathan Morcom	9	5	5	19	10	3	18	14	9	5	4	3	11	9	Ret	377
7	(Australia) Josh Buchan	3	6	6	13	Ret	9	14	11	10	1	**1**	**2**	DNS	Ret	10	365
8	(Australia) James Moffat	10	Ret	Ret	11	18	12	16	7	6	2	5	4	5	5	15	351
9	(Australia) Jason Bargwanna	11	8	Ret	7	5	1	11	9	8	DSQ	14	Ret	9	3	5	342
10	(Australia) Ben Bargwanna	13	10	14	8	9	6	12	12	17	21	9	8	**2**	Ret	12	333
11	(Australia) Michael Caruso	12	Ret	9	17	15	17	15	DSQ	18	6	3	1	3	Ret	3	326
12	(Australia) Bradley Shiels	8	7	15	18	11	14	7	8	7	18	13	10	DSQ	11	8	318
13	(Australia) Lee Holdsworth	**1**	**2**	3	3	16	19	5	6	Ret	8	8	16				315
14	(Australia) Tony D'Alberto	15	9	12	5	4	2	10	Ret	21	4	10	9				290
15	(Australia) Dylan O'Keeffe	14	11	10	15	14	7	Ret	18	14	**10**	6	17	10	Ret	13	285
16	(Australia) Zac Soutar	18	12	Ret	10	8	16	19	13	15	13	Ret	11	12	12	6	262
17	(Australia) Jay Hanson	7	Ret	7	Ret	17	8	4	Ret	11	12	19	14	Ret	8	DNS	240
18	(Australia) Michael Clemente	16	13	11	14	6	5	13	Ret	20	16	12	Ret				198
19	(Australia) Lachlan Mineef				9	12	13				17	16	15	14	6	11	189
20	(Australia) Chelsea Angelo				16	13	11	20	17	19	19	15	19				134
21	(Australia) Garth Tander							3	3	4							110
22	(Australia) Duvashen Padayachee							21	15	12	15	17	13				95
23	(Australia) Keegan Brain													13	10	14	69
24	(Germany) Christopher Mies													DNS	4	7	68
25	(Australia) Liam McAdam							17	16	16							45
26	(Australia) Michael King										20	18	18				38

Key
Colour	Result
Gold	Winner
Silver	Second place
Bronze	Third place
Green	Other points position
Blue	Other classified position
Blue	Not classified, finished (NC)
Purple	Not classified, retired (Ret)
Red	Did not qualify (DNQ)
Red	Did not pre-qualify (DNPQ)
Black	Disqualified (DSQ)
White	Did not start (DNS)
White	Race cancelled (C)
Blank	Did not practice (DNP)
Blank	Excluded (EX)
Blank	Did not arrive (DNA)
Blank	Withdrawn (WD)
Blank	Did not enter (cell empty)
Text formatting	Meaning
**Bold**	Pole position
Italics	Fastest lap

== Supercheap Auto TCR Baskerville Invitational (Non Championship) ==
=== Entries ===
Team	Car	No.	Drivers
(Australia) GRM Team Valvoline	Alfa Romeo Giulietta Veloce TCR	5	(Australia) Jordan Cox
(Australia) GRM Team Valvoline	Alfa Romeo Giulietta Veloce TCR	7	(Australia) Zac Hudson
(Australia) GRM Team Valvoline	Peugeot 308 TCR	18	(Australia) Aaron Cameron
(Australia) Renault Sport GRM	Renault Mégane R.S TCR	33	(Australia) Dylan O'Keeffe
(Australia) 50 Years of Bursons 1971-2021	Peugeot 308 TCR	71	(Australia) Ben Bargwanna
(Australia) Team Soutar Motorsport	Honda Civic Type R TCR (FK8)	110	(Australia) Zac Soutar

=== Standings ===
Pos.	Driver	R1	R2	R3	R4	Pts
1	(Australia) Aaron Cameron	2	2	1	1	134
2	(Australia) Jordan Cox	1	4	3	3	124
3	(Australia) Zac Soutar	4	3	2	2	121
4	(Australia) Ben Bargwanna	3	1	4	4	118
5	(Australia) Zac Hudson	6	6	5	5	102
6	(Australia) Dylan O'Keeffe	5	5	DNS	DNS	45
