= Autoglym =

British manufacturer

- Company type: Division
- Founded: 1965; 61 years ago
- Headquarters: Letchworth, UK
- Area served: Global
- Products: Car care List of products
- Owner: Altro Limited
- Website: autoglym.com

Autoglym is a British manufacturer of a range of car care and valeting products, which are sold in over 45 countries.

Established in 1965, and based in Letchworth, Hertfordshire, Autoglym is part of the Altro Group.

The company's products are used by customers such as vehicle manufacturers, distributors, bodyshops, professional valeting companies and transport operators. The product range consists of exterior (chassis, bodywork, wheels), interior and glass care products. It also includes Autoglym LifeShine, a dealer-applied system of treatments that provides long-lasting protection for the paintwork, glass and upholstery of a car.

Autoglym currently holds a Royal Warrant in the UK as Supplier of car care products.

== History ==
The Autoglym brand was founded in 1965 by a UK Motor Trade entrepreneur Dennis Barley who developed a unique system for renovating used car paintwork. There were 11 products in the original range, including polishes, a sealant, a paint renovator and glass, interior, engine and wheel cleaners. The products were only available to professional valets working in garages and workshops. The company had its manufacturing base in Digswell, trading as Welwyn Plastics. Welwyn Plastics used to produce other liquid products for various other industries, before deciding to concentrate solely on the production of Autoglym products, due to the strong growth of the brand. The sales and administration centre was in Welwyn Garden City trading as Autoglym. The first Autoglym training and product testing facility was established at the Welwyn site, something that has always been a key element in the Autoglym product development and improvement process. Autoglym was purchased by the Altro Group in the mid-1970s.

=== Expansion ===
The Autoglym name was now becoming an open 'trade secret' and due to repeated requests from members of the public the decision was taken to introduce a range aimed at the home enthusiast. In 1986 Autoglym launched their retail range consisting of existing products and some developed especially for home users. As the brand continued to expand Autoglym outgrew their Welwyn site and sought new premises in Letchworth Garden City, adjacent to the Altro Headquarters. Autoglym moved to Letchworth in 1991 allowing increased manufacturing output, larger research and development facilities, larger product testing and development bays and the unification of the sales and manufacturing departments on one site.

1991 also brought about a new line of products, the body shop range. This was developed in response to requests from customers who wanted a silicone free range of compounds, dressings and glass cleaners that would be safe to use in strictly silicone free environments.

ISO accreditation was awarded in 1991 along with a Royal Warrant from the Prince of Wales. The Queen Mothers Royal Warrant followed in 1992.

The Public Service Vehicle division catering to buses, coaches and trains was established at the beginning of 1994.

A line of bespoke motorcycle products was launched in 2001.

The LifeShine new vehicle protection system was launched in 2003.

Queen Elizabeth II awarded her Royal Warrant in 2004.

King Charles III awarded his Royal Warrant in 2024.

== Retail products ==
The following is a list of products manufactured by Autoglym for commercial retail:

- Active Insect Remover
- Alloy Wheel Seal
- Aqua Wax
- Autofresh
- Bird Dropping Wipes
- Bodywork Shampoo Conditioner
- Bumper & Trim Detailer
- Bumper & Trim Gel
- Cabriolet Fabric Hood - Maintenance Kit
- Car Glass Polish
- Caravan and Motorhome Cleaner
- Clean Wheels
- Custom Wheel Cleaner
- De-Icer
- Engine & Machine Cleaner
- Extra Gloss Protection
- Fast Glass
- Glass Spray
- Hi-Foam Interior Shampoo
- Hi-Tech Aqua-Dry
- Hi-Tech Finishing Cloth
- Hi-Tech Flexi Water Blade
- Hi-Tech Interior Microfibre
- Hi-Tech Microfibre Drying Towel
- Hi-Tech Wheel Brush
- High Definition Cleanser
- High Definition Ceramic Coating
- High Definition Wax
- Instant Show Shine
- Instant Tyre Dressing
- Intensive Tar Remover
- Interior Shampoo
- Leather Care Balm
- Leather Cleaner
- Metal Polish
- Odour Eliminator
- Paint Renovator
- Perfect Palm Applicator
- Perfect Polishing Cloth
- Pressure Wash
- Rapid Detailer
- Satin Matt Black
- Silicone Spray
- Silicone-Free Spray
- Super Resin Polish
- Surface Detailing Clay Kit
- Ultra Deep Shine
- Ultra High Definition Ceramic Coating
- Ultimate Screenwash
- Vinyl & Rubber Care
- Wheel Silver
