= 2020 Australian Grand Prix =

Cancelled 2020 Formula One season race

- Layout of the Albert Park Circuit

Race details
- Date: Planned for 15 March 2020
- Official name: Formula 1 Rolex Australian Grand Prix 2020
- Location: Albert Park Circuit, Melbourne, Australia
- Course: Temporary street circuit
- Course length: 5.303 km (3.295 miles)
- Scheduled distance: 58 laps, 307.574 km (191.118 miles)

The 2020 Australian Grand Prix (formally known as the Formula 1 Rolex Australian Grand Prix 2020) was a Formula One motor race that was due to be held on 15 March 2020 in Melbourne, Victoria. The race was to be contested at the Albert Park Circuit and was intended to be the first round of the 2020 Formula One World Championship. Hours before the first practice session was due to begin, the event was cancelled in response to the COVID-19 pandemic in Australia.

The race would have been the 85th race in the combined history of the Australian Grand Prix, which dates back to the 100 Miles Road Race of 1928, as well as the 25th time the event had been held at the Albert Park circuit and the 36th time the Australian Grand Prix had been a part of the Formula One World Championship.

Lewis Hamilton initially entered the round as the defending World Drivers' Champion and his team, Mercedes, was the defending World Constructors' Champions. His teammate Valtteri Bottas was due to be defending race winner.

== Background ==
In December 2019, the Australian Grand Prix was officially confirmed as the first of twenty-two races of the originally planned 2020 Formula One World Championship at an FIA World Motor Sport Council meeting in Paris. The race was due to take place at the sixteen-turn, 5.303 km (3.295 mi) Albert Park Circuit in Melbourne, Victoria, on 15 March 2020.

=== Entrants ===
Initially, ten teams each with two drivers entered the race. Scuderia AlphaTauri were due to compete for the first time after the rebranding of Scuderia Toro Rosso. Esteban Ocon was due to return to the championship, replacing Nico Hülkenberg at Renault. Nicholas Latifi was scheduled to make his Grand Prix race debut with Williams, taking the seat previously filled by Robert Kubica.

Mission Winnow, the title sponsor of Ferrari, was banned from the race as it did not comply with local laws governing tobacco sponsorship.

== Impact of the COVID-19 pandemic ==
The weeks before the Grand Prix saw several major sporting events either cancelled or postponed as a result of the COVID-19 pandemic, which was declared a pandemic by World Health Organization on 12 March. The Chinese Grand Prix had already been postponed several weeks prior and would later be cancelled altogether. (Note: Other motorsport events affected included the World Endurance Championship, the MotoGP World Championship, the World Touring Car Cup, the Formula E championship, the World Rally Championship, the Japanese Super Formula championship, and the IndyCar Series.)

The Victorian Department of Health announced that the Australian Grand Prix would go ahead as planned; Italian-based teams Ferrari and AlphaTauri expressed concern, as the COVID-19 pandemic in Italy was one of the worst outbreaks of the virus outside China. As the Australian Government did not initially implement a travel ban for Italy the way it had for China, Iran, and South Korea, (Note: The Australian government introduced a travel ban for Italy on 11 March, after teams and their personnel had left the country for Melbourne.) Ferrari and AlphaTauri were concerned over the ability of their staff to leave the quarantine zone established in northern Italy. Ross Brawn, the managing director of the sport, announced that Grands Prix would not go ahead if a team were blocked from entering a host nation, but added that a race could take place if a team voluntarily chose not to enter a host nation.

Organisers of the Bahrain Grand Prix, which was originally scheduled to take place one week after the Australian race, announced that spectators would not be permitted to attend the event. Organisers of the Australian Grand Prix opted against similar measures, instead moving to minimise contact between spectators and competitors. The rule was also applied to competitors in support categories, including the Supercars Championship, S5000 Championship, and the TCR Asia-Pacific Cup, which was to be held as a non-championship round of the TCR Australia Series.

Five crew members, four from Haas and one from McLaren, were entered into quarantine upon arriving in Melbourne when they displayed flu-like symptoms. All five of them were tested for COVID-19 and the results came out negative for the Haas members but positive for the McLaren member. McLaren made the announcement on Thursday evening and withdrew from the race. A photographer later entered isolation as well. Victoria Premier Daniel Andrews was criticised for allowing the Grand Prix to go ahead; he responded by saying that cancelling the race would be a disproportionate reaction to the advice the state government had been given. Formula One drivers Lewis Hamilton and Kimi Räikkönen were also critical of the decision to hold the race, citing the National Basketball Association's decision to indefinitely suspend its 2019–20 season. Daniel Andrews announced that spectators would be banned from attending if the Grand Prix were to go ahead, before the race was cancelled on the Friday morning a few hours before the Formula One cars were due to commence their first practice session. It subsequently emerged that only three teams—Red Bull Racing, its sister team Scuderia AlphaTauri and Racing Point—were willing to compete if the race went ahead. After the cancellation, a further fourteen team members from McLaren were put into quarantine.

All support category events were also cancelled. These had conducted practice and qualifying sessions on the Thursday, along with a singular race for the Porsche Carrera Cup Australia series. A two-seater Minardi also performed some demonstration runs early on the Friday morning.

The 2020 season would eventually start with the Austrian Grand Prix at the Red Bull Ring in July 2020.

=== Attempt to reschedule ===
Shortly after the cancellation, organisers announced that they planned to reschedule the race for later in the year. Several more Grands Prix were cancelled or postponed and the start of the championship delayed until July. A new calendar with eight races was eventually published, but the Australian Grand Prix was not included; however, Liberty Media announced that they intended to hold as many as fifteen races. In June 2020, federal tourism minister Simon Birmingham announced that the Australian government expected that the country's borders would be closed to international travel until 2021. The race was never rescheduled for the 2020 season, with the 2021 event moved from the traditional March date to November, before being cancelled for a second consecutive year.

After a two-year absence due to the COVID-19 pandemic, the 2022 edition came back in April as the third round of the championship on a new circuit layout.

== Lawsuit ==
After the cancellation of the race, World Touring Melbourne (WTM) sued the Australian Grand Prix Corporation (AGPC) for the cancellation of the event. WTM sued AGPC for $8 million as the promoter had failed the obligation and caused WTM to suffer loss and damages. The agency is seeking a total of $7.594 million for costs incurred, plus $1.128 million in lost profits. British singer Robbie Williams was scheduled to perform for the next night with fee of $1.94 million, American pop singer Miley Cyrus was also scheduled to perform during the same event. WTM stated that they were informed about the cancellation after the teleconference before the race official cancellation.

In front of the Supreme Court of Victoria, the defendant’s case was that the Grand Prix and the WTM Concert were cancelled on the advice, rather than the direction, of Dr Sutton, then Chief Health Officer of Victoria. It argued that the phone and email communications between the AGPC and Dr Sutton on 13 March 2020, when understood in context, evidenced Dr Sutton’s advice to cancel both events.

The Court found that AGPC represented that both the 2020 Grand Prix and the WTM Concert had been cancelled because Dr Sutton, then Chief Health Officer of Victoria had directed that both events could not proceed and that this representation was likely to mislead or deceive. The Court found that WTM relied on the representation.

The Court also found that in an email sent to WTM at 4.25pm on Friday 13 March, AGPC made a further representation that the advice provided by Dr Sutton, then Chief Health Officer of Victoria, extended to other activities in the area surrounding the Grand Prix, and that this advice must be followed. It was found that this representation was contrary to a text message from Dr Sutton earlier that day which said that the decision to cancel the WTM Concert was ultimately a matter for the organisers. The Court found that this representation by AGPC was likely to mislead or deceive and that WTM relied on the representation.

Additionally, the Court found that AGPC had breached different terms of a contract with WTM. The terms breached included a right on WTM to stage the event and a corresponding obligation on AGPC to allow it to do so, an obligation for AGPC to provide a venue to WTM that was fit for purpose, and an obligation to provide a copy of the written advice of the then Chief Health Officer of Victoria, Dr Sutton. A settlement amounting to $2.84 million after costs was reached.

== See also ==
- Impact of the COVID-19 pandemic on motorsport
- 2011 Bahrain Grand Prix, the last Grand Prix cancelled before the 2020 Australian Grand Prix; cancelled because of the 2011 Bahraini uprising
- 2022 Russian Grand Prix, which was suspended and subsequently cancelled due to the Russian invasion of Ukraine
- 2023 Emilia Romagna Grand Prix, which was cancelled due to sudden floods in the region
- 2026 Saudi Arabian Grand Prix, which was cancelled due to the 2026 Iran war

== Notes ==
Previous race: N/A	FIA Formula One World Championship; 2020 season	Next race: N/A
Previous race: 2019 Australian Grand Prix	Australian Grand Prix	Next race: 2022 Australian Grand Prix
