= Zac Soutar =

Australian racing driver (born 1997)

- Nationality: (Australia) Australian
- Born: Zachary Dylan Soutar; 7 August 1997 (age 29) Ocean Grove, Victoria, Australia
- Categorisation: FIA Silver

Zachary Dylan Soutar (born 7 August 1997) is an Australian racing driver competing in the GT4 Australia Series for Tufflift Racing by Team Soutar Motorsport.

== Personal life ==
Soutar is the son of Shane Soutar, a multi-time Australian sidecar champion, who founded Team Soutar Motorsport alongside Zac in 2017.

== Career ==
Soutar began karting at the age of eleven, competing until 2016. In this time in karts, Soutar most notably finished runner-up in the South Australian Sprint Kart Championship in X30 Light, as wella as the Victorian State Kart Championship in TaG Light. Soutar also finished third in the 2013 Australian State Championship South Australia's Leopard Light and Australian State Championship Queensland's Junior National Heavy points, as well as the 2015 Australian Kart Championship's KF2 standings.

Stepping up to Formula Ford competition in 2017 with his family's team, Soutar scored a best result of seventh in the Australian Formula Ford Series to end the season ninth in points. Returning to the series for the following year, Soutar scored his maiden series win at Sandown and six more podiums to end the year third in points. Continuing in Formula Ford in 2019, Soutar scored five wins and five other podiums to end the year runner-up to Angelo Mouzouris by 18 points at season's end.

The following year, Soutar moved to TCR competition, and was set to race in the TCR Asia Pacific Cup and TCR Australia, but ultimately didn't race as the COVID-19 pandemic cancelled both seasons. Soutar's debut in TCR Australia eventually came in 2021 for his family team, scoring a best result of sixth in race three at Bathurst en route to a 16th-place points finish. During 2021, Soutar also partook in the TCR Baskerville Invitational, scoring three podiums in the four races.

Remaining in TCR Australia for 2022, taking his maiden series win at Symmons Plains, and scored further podiums at Queensland and Sandown to end the year sixth in points. Continuing in the series for the following year, Soutar scored three third-place finishes between the Winton and Queensland rounds as he ended his first year with the Audi RS3 tenth in points. Soutar remained in the series for 2024 for his family team alongside Glenn Nirwan. In his fourth season in the series, Soutar won twice at Tailem Bend and once at Bathurst, and took five more podiums to secure runner-up honors.

In 2025, Soutar transitioned to GT4 Australia with the family team, scoring a best result of seventh and second in class at Tailem Bend en route to a fifth-place points finish in the Silver-Am class. During 2025, Soutar also raced in the season-opening Tailem Bend round of TCR Australia for the same team. The following year, Soutar remained with the team for his sophomore season in GT4 Australia alongside Glenn Nirwan.

== Karting record ==
=== Karting career summary ===
Season	Series	Team	Position
2013	Australian State Championship South Australia — Leopard Light		3rd
2013	Australian State Championship Queensland — Junior National Heavy		3rd
2013	Rotax Pro Tour Australia — Junior Max		4th
2013	Australian National Sprint Kart Championship — Junior National Heavy		10th
2014	Australian National Sprint Kart Championship — X30 Light		5th
2014	South Australian Sprint Kart Championship — X30 Light		2nd
2014	South Australian Sprint Kart Championship — Rotax Light		3rd
2014	Australian State Championship Victorian State — X30 Light		5th
2014	Australian State Championship Victorian State — Rotax Light		4th
2015	Australian Kart Championship — KF2		3rd
2016	Australian Kart Championship — X30		9th

== Racing record ==
=== Racing career summary ===
Season	Series	Team	Races	Wins	Poles	F/Laps	Podiums	Points	Position
2017	Australian Formula Ford Series	Team Soutar Motorsport	17	0	0	0	0	78.5	9th
2017	Victorian Formula Ford Fiesta Championship	Team Soutar Motorsport	15	0	0	0	1	238	5th
2017	New South Wales Formula Ford Fiesta Championship	Team Soutar Motorsport	5	0	0	0	0	0	NC
2018	Australian Formula Ford Series	Team Soutar Motorsport	21	1	0	1	7	239	**3rd**
2018	Victorian Formula Ford Fiesta Championship	Team Soutar Motorsport	12	1	0	2	6	277	**3rd**
2018	New South Wales Formula Ford Fiesta Championship	Team Soutar Motorsport	6	0	0	0	0	76	15th
2019	Australian Formula Ford Series	Team Soutar Motorsport	21	5	2	2	10	277	**2nd**
2019	Victorian Formula Ford Championship	Team Soutar Motorsport	6	3	2	0	4	158	6th
2019	Formula Ford Fiesta New South Wales	Team Soutar Motorsport	6	1	0	1	4	149	7th
2021	TCR Australia Touring Car Series	Team Soutar Motorsport	15	0	0	0	0	262	16th
2021	TCR Baskerville Invitational	Team Soutar Motorsport	4	0	0	1	3	121	**3rd**
2022	TCR Australia Touring Car Series	Team Soutar Motorsport	20	1	0	0	4	588	6th
2023	TCR Australia Touring Car Series	Team Soutar Motorsport	19	0	0	0	3	364	10th
2023	TCR World Tour	Team Soutar Motorsport	6	0	0	0	0	18	28th
2024	TCR Australia Touring Car Series	Team Soutar Motorsport	21	3	1	2	8	729	**2nd**
2025	GT4 Australia Series – Silver-Am	Love Racing Team Soutar	12	0	0	1	2	99	5th
2025	TCR Australia Touring Car Series	Team Soutar Motorsport	2	0	0	0	0	74	4th
2025	TCR World Tour	Team Soutar Motorsport	2	0	0	0	0	6	34th
2026	GT4 Australia Series – Silver-Am	Tufflift Racing by Team Soutar Motorsport							

=== Complete TCR Australia Touring Car Series results ===
(key) (Races in bold indicate pole position) (Races in italics indicate fastest lap)

Year	Team	Car	1	2	3	4	5	6	7	8	9	10	11	12	13	14	15	16	17	18	19	20	21	Position	Points
2021	Team Soutar Motorsport	Honda Civic Type R TCR (FK8)	SYM; R1; 18	SYM; R2; 12	SYM; R3; Ret	PHI; R4; 10	PHI; R5; 8	PHI; R6; 16	BAT; R7; 19	BAT; R8; 13	BAT; R9; 15	SMP; R10; 13	SMP; R11; Ret	SMP; R12; 11	BAT; R13; 12	BAT; R14; 12	BAT; R15; 6							16th	262
2022	Team Soutar Motorsport	Honda Civic Type R TCR (FK8)	SYM; R1; 6	SYM; R2; 6	SYM; R3; 1	PHI; R4; 5	PHI; R5; 17	PHI; R6; 8	BAT; R7; 13	BAT; R8; 13	BAT; R9; 13	SMP; R10; 5	SMP; R11; 9	SMP; R12; 12	QLD; R13; 2	QLD; R14; 6	QLD; R15; 2	SAN; R16; 3	SAN; R17; 5	SAN; R18; 16	BAT; R19; Ret	BAT; R20; C	BAT; R21; 15	6th	588
2023	Team Soutar Motorsport	Audi RS 3 LMS TCR (2021)	SYM; R1; DNS	SYM; R2; Ret	SYM; R3; DNS	PHI; R4; Ret^{2}	PHI; R5; 7	PHI; R6; 7	WIN; R7; 3^{5}	WIN; R8; 7	WIN; R9; 3	QLD; R10; 3	QLD; R11; 11	QLD; R12; Ret	SAN; R13; 4^{3}	SAN; R14; 7	SAN; R15; Ret	SMP; R16; Ret^{5}	SMP; R17; 18	SMP; R18; 17	BAT; R19; 11^{3}	BAT; R20; 19	BAT; R21; 8	10th	364
2024	Team Soutar Motorsport	Audi RS 3 LMS TCR (2021)	SAN; R1; 4^{2}	SAN; R2; 4	SAN; R3; 4	SYM; R4; 3^{3}	SYM; R5; 5	SYM; R6; 4	PHI; R7; 2^{6}	PHI; R8; 7	PHI; R9; 6	BND; R10; 9^{4}	BND; R11; 1	BND; R12; 1	QLD; R13; 3^{3}	QLD; R14; 6	QLD; R15; 2	SMP; R16; 6^{6}	SMP; R17; Ret	SMP; R18; 8	**BAT**; **R19**; 1^{1}	BAT; R20; 7	BAT; R21; 3	2nd	729
2025	Team Soutar Motorsport	Audi RS 3 LMS TCR (2021)	BND; R1; C	BND; R2; 13	BND; R3; 13	GUI; R4	GUI; R5	GUI; R6																4th	74

=== Complete TCR World Tour results ===
(key) (Races in bold indicate pole position) (Races in italics indicate fastest lap)

Year	Team	Car	1	2	3	4	5	6	7	8	9	10	11	12	13	14	15	16	17	18	19	20	DC	Points
2023	Team Soutar Motorsport	Audi RS 3 LMS TCR (2021)	POR; 1	POR; 2	SPA; 1	SPA; 2	VAL; 1	VAL; 2	HUN; 1	HUN; 2	ELP; 1	ELP; 2	VIL; 1	VIL; 2	SYD; 1 Ret	SYD; 2; 18	SYD; 3; 17	BAT; 1; 11	BAT; 2; 19	BAT; 3; 8	MAC; 1	MAC; 2	28th	18
2025	Team Soutar Motorsport	Audi RS 3 LMS TCR (2021)	MEX; 1	MEX; 2	MEX; 3	ESP; 1	ESP; 2	ESP; 3	ITA; 1	ITA; 2	POR; 1	POR; 2	AUS; 1 C	AUS; 2; 13	AUS; 3; 13	KOR; 1	KOR; 2	KOR; 3	CHN; 1	CHN; 2	MAC; 1	MAC; 2	34th	6

=== Complete GT4 Australia Series results ===
(key) (Races in bold indicate pole position) (Races in italics indicate fastest lap)

Year	Team	Car	Class	1	2	3	4	5	6	7	8	9	10	11	12	Pos	Points
2025	Love Racing Team Soutar	McLaren Artura GT4	Silver-Am	PHI; R1; 15	PHI; R2; Ret	SMP; R3; 10	SMP; R4; 14	QLD; R5; 17	QLD; R6; NC	SAN; R7; 10	SAN; R8; 22	**BEN**; **R9**; 7	BEN; R10; 16	HAM; R11; Ret	HAM; R12; 10	5th	99
2026	Love Racing Team Soutar	McLaren Artura GT4	Silver-Am	PHI; R1; 18	PHI; R2; 11	BEN; R3; 13	BEN; R4; Ret	QLD; R5; 17	QLD; R6; 11	HID; R7	HID; R8	SYD; R9	SYD; R10	ADL; R11	ADL; R12	2nd*	69*
