= 2020 TCR Asia Pacific Cup =

Touring car racing competition

Race details
Date	13–15 March
Official name	Carsales 1st TCR Asia Pacific Cup
Location	Albert Park Circuit, Melbourne, Australia
Course	Temporary street circuit 5.027 km (3.124 mi)
Supporting	Australian Grand Prix; Supercars Championship; Australian S5000 Championship
Distance	Race 1; 8 laps, 40.216 km (24.989 mi); Race 2; 8 laps, 40.216 km (24.989 mi); Race 3; 8 laps, 40.216 km (24.989 mi)
- Race 1

Pole
Driver	(Australia) Garth Tander	(Australia) Melbourne Performance Centre
- Time 2:04.361

Fastest lap
- N/A

Podium
- Race cancelled
- Race 2
- Race cancelled
- Race 3
- Race cancelled

The 2020 Carsales TCR Asia Pacific Cup was due to be the first edition of the TCR Asia Pacific Cup held at Albert Park Circuit in Melbourne on 13–15 March 2020. The race was going to be contested with TCR touring cars and run in support of the 2020 Australian Grand Prix. The cup would've run as part of the 2020 TCR Australia Touring Car Series. The event was cancelled due to Coronavirus pandemic.

== Teams and drivers ==
The following teams and drivers were entered into the event:

Team	Car	No.	Drivers	Ref.
(Australia) HMO Customer Racing	Hyundai i30 N TCR	1	(Australia) Will Brown	
(Australia) HMO Customer Racing	Hyundai i30 N TCR	11	(Australia) Nathan Morcom	
(Australia) Melbourne Performance Centre	Volkswagen Golf GTI TCR	2	(Australia) Chelsea Angelo	
(Australia) Melbourne Performance Centre	Audi RS 3 LMS TCR	35	(Australia) Alexandra Whitley	
(Australia) Melbourne Performance Centre	Audi RS 3 LMS TCR	75	(Australia) Garth Tander	
(Australia) Melbourne Performance Centre	Audi RS 3 LMS TCR	97	(Australia) Liam McAdam	
(Australia) Melbourne Performance Centre	Audi RS 3 LMS TCR	100	(Australia) Hamish Ribarits	
(Australia) Team Valvoline GRM	Alfa Romeo Giulietta Veloce TCR	7	(Australia) Michael Caruso	
(Australia) Team Valvoline GRM	Peugeot 308 TCR	18	(Australia) Aaron Cameron	
(Australia) Ashley Seward Motorsport	Alfa Romeo Giulietta Veloce TCR	9	(Australia) Jay Hanson	
(Australia) Ashley Seward Motorsport	Alfa Romeo Giulietta Veloce TCR	10	(Australia) James Allen	
(Australia) Michael Clemente Motorsport	Honda Civic Type R TCR (FK8)	15	(Australia) Michael Clemente	
(Australia) Burson Auto Parts Racing	Peugeot 308 TCR	17	(Australia) Jason Bargwanna	
(New Zealand) Track Tec Racing	Audi RS 3 LMS TCR	22	(New Zealand) Jack Milligan	
(New Zealand) Track Tec Racing	Audi RS 3 LMS TCR	77	(Netherlands) Stan van Oord	
(Australia) Renault Sport GRM	Renault Mégane R.S TCR	33	(Australia) Dylan O'Keeffe	
(Australia) Renault Sport GRM	Renault Mégane R.S TCR	34	(Australia) James Moffat	
(Germany) Münnich Motorsport by Wall Racing	Honda Civic Type R TCR (FK8)	49	(Germany) René Münnich	
(Hong Kong) KCMG with Wall Racing	Honda Civic Type R TCR (FK8)	51	(Japan) Takuya Shirasaka	
(Australia) Team Soutar Motorsport	Honda Civic Type R TCR (FK8)	110	(Australia) Zac Soutar	
(France) JSB Compétition with Garry Rogers Motorsport	Peugeot 308 TCR	308	(France) Julien Briché	
(Australia) Milldun Motorsport	Volkswagen Golf GTI TCR	777	(Australia) Declan Fraser	

== Practice ==
Session	Day	Fastest lap					
Session	Day	No.	Driver	Team	Car	Time	Ref.
Practice 1	Thursday	1	(Australia) Will Brown	HMO Customer Racing	Hyundai i30 N TCR	2:04.6467	
Practice 2	Thursday	1	(Australia) Will Brown	HMO Customer Racing	Hyundai i30 N TCR	2:05.1832	

== Qualifying ==
Pos.	No.	Driver	Car	Time	Gap
1	75	(Australia) Garth Tander	Audi RS 3 LMS TCR	2:04.3614	
2	88	(Australia) Michael Caruso	Alfa Romeo Giulietta Veloce TCR	2:04.8625	0:00.5011
3	11	(Australia) Nathan Morcom	Hyundai i30 N TCR	2:05.0242	0:00.6628
4	1	(Australia) Will Brown	Hyundai i30 N TCR	2:05.0834	0:00.7220
5	34	(Australia) James Moffat	Renault Megane RS TCR	2:05.4133	0:01.0519
6	18	(Australia) Aaron Cameron	Peugeot 308 TCR	2:05.7076	0:01.3462
7	308	(France) Julien Briché	Peugeot 308 TCR	2:05.7643	0:01.4029
8	10	(Australia) James Allen	Alfa Romeo Giulietta Veloce TCR	2:05.8444	0:01.4830
9	75	(Netherlands) Stan Van Oord	Audi RS 3 LMS TCR	2:05.9596	0:01.5982
10	33	(Australia) Dylan O'Keeffe	Renault Megane RS TCR	2:06.0054	0:01.6440
11	110	(Australia) Zac Soutar	Honda Civic Type R TCR	2:06.0593	0:01.6979
12	15	(Australia) Michael Clemente	Honda Civic Type R TCR	2:06.1227	0:01.7613
13	17	(Australia) Jason Bargwanna	Peugeot 308 TCR	2:06.2720	0:01.9106
14	9	(Australia) Jay Hanson	Alfa Romeo Giulietta TCR	2:06.7576	0:02.3962
15	51	(Japan) Takuya Shirasaka	Honda Civic Type R TCR	2:06.7612	0:02.3998
16	100	(Australia) Hamish Ribarits	Audi RS 3 LMS TCR	2:06.8045	0:02.4431
17	2	(Australia) Chelsea Angelo	Volkswagen Golf GTi TCR	2:07.0195	0:02.6581
18	777	(Australia) Declan Fraser	Volkswagen Golf GTi TCR	2:07.5142	0:03.1528
19	97	(Australia) Liam McAdam	Audi RS 3 LMS TCR	2:07.8918	0:03.5304
20	22	(New Zealand) Jack Milligan	Audi RS 3 LMS TCR	2:08.0381	0:03.6767
21	35	(Australia) Alexandra Whitley	Volkswagen Golf GTi TCR	2:08.2245	0:03.6767
22	49	(Germany) René Münnich	Honda Civic Type R TCR	2:08.9870	0:04.6256

== Results and standings ==
Points system

Position	1st	2nd	3rd	4th	5th	6th	7th	8th	9th	10th	11th	12th	13th	14th	15th	16th	17th	18th	19th	20th	DNF
Races 1 & 2	40	36	32	28	26	24	22	20	18	16	14	13	12	11	10	9	8	7	6	5	0
Race 3	50	46	42	38	36	31	29	27	25	23	19	18	17	16	15	12	11	10	9	8	0

- Two (2) points will be awarded for obtaining Pole Position in qualifying.

=== Drivers' standings ===
Pos.	Driver	ALB (Victoria (state))	Points
1	(Australia) Garth Tander	^{P}	2
Pos.	Driver	ALB (Victoria (state))	Points
