= Bart Horsten =

Australian racing driver (born 2002)

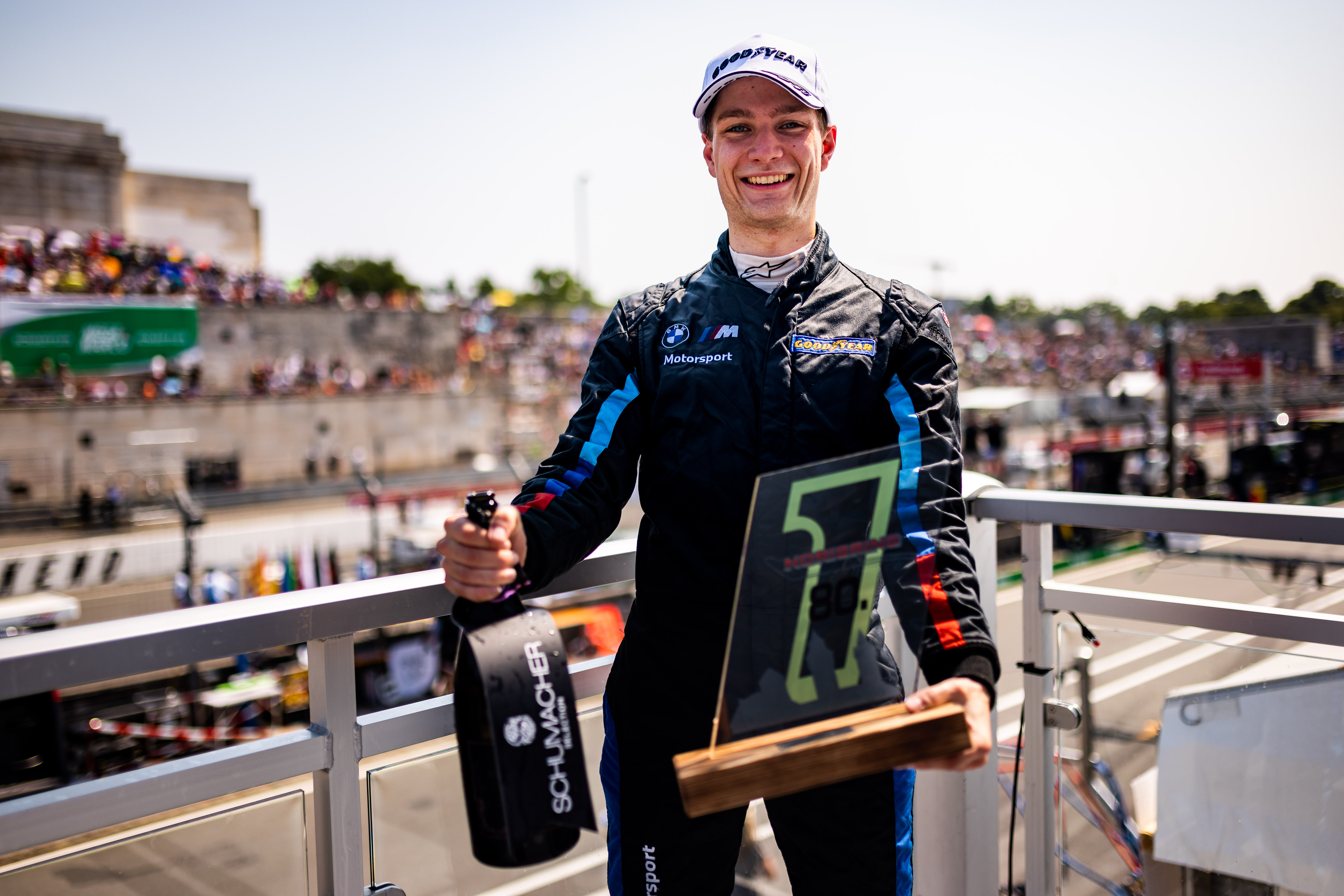
- Horsten holding his first place BMW M2 Cup trophy at Norisring
- Nationality: (Australia) Australian (Republic of Ireland) Irish via dual nationality
- Born: Bartholomew Horsten; 14 March 2002 (age 24) Sydney, Australia

BMW M2 Cup Germany career
- Debut season: 2022
- Current team: Project 1
- Car number: 50
- Starts: 19
- Wins: 2
- Podiums: 6
- Poles: 1
- Fastest laps: 2

Previous series
- 2021 2020 2019 2018: BRDC British Formula 3 Championship; F4 British Championship; Australian Formula Ford Championship

Bartholomew Horsten (born 14 March 2002 in Sydney) is an Australian-Irish racing driver. He is currently competing in the BMW M2 Cup having previously driven for Hitech GP in BRDC British Formula 3 Championship.

== Career ==
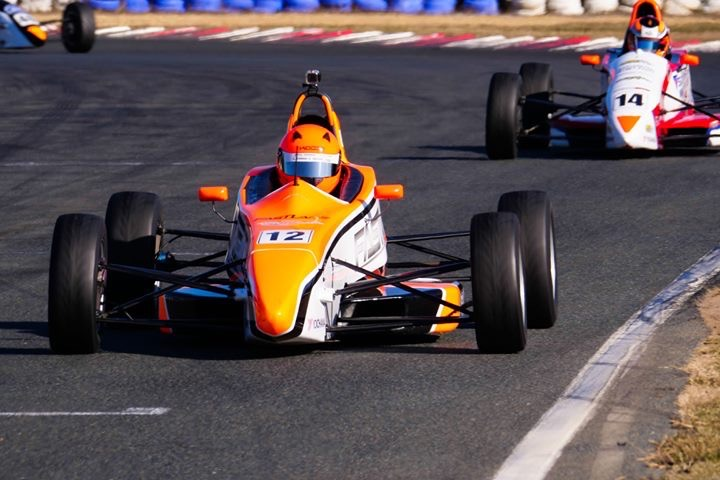
Horsten competing in the 2018 Australian Formula Ford Series

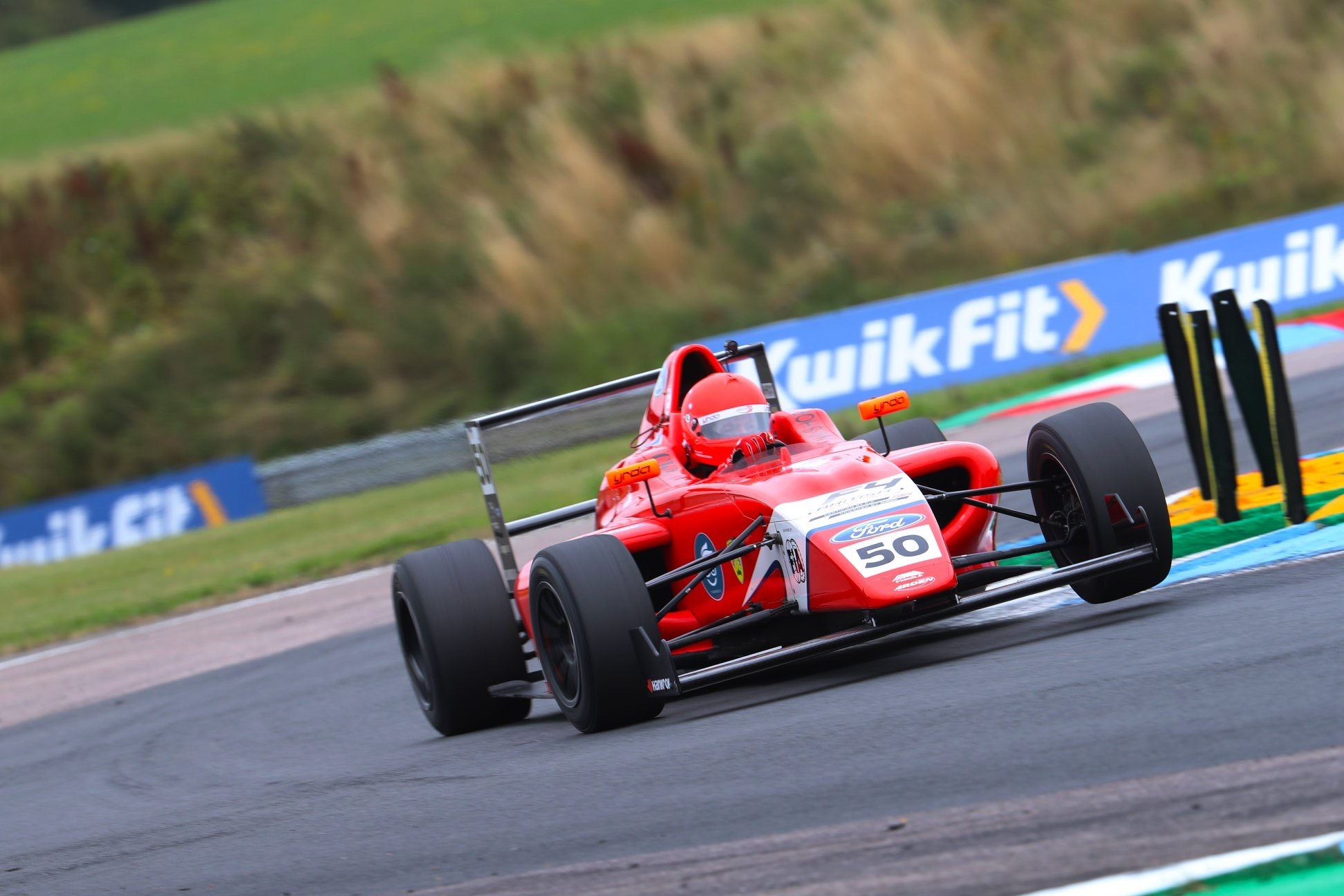
Horsten piloting the Arden F4 at Thruxton Circuit

=== Australian Formula Ford Series ===
In 2018, Horsten made his single-seater debut, competing in the Australian Formula Ford Series, taking three podiums and one fastest lap to finish ninth in the championship.

=== F4 British Championship ===
In 2019, Horsten competed in British F4 with Arden where he achieved ten podium finishes, including his maiden victory in the second round at Donington Park. This, along with a fastest lap at Knockhill meant the Australian finished fifth in the championship, three and four positions ahead of teammates Tommy Foster and Alex Connor respectively.

=== BRDC British F3 Championship ===
Horsten made a move to the BRDC British Formula 3 Championship for 2020, where he would compete with Lanan Racing, partnering Piers Prior and Josh Mason. In the second race of the season, he achieved his first podium of the year along with a fastest lap at the Oulton Park Circuit. Horsten picked up his best finish of second at Silverstone to take tenth place in the championship, beating both of his teammates.

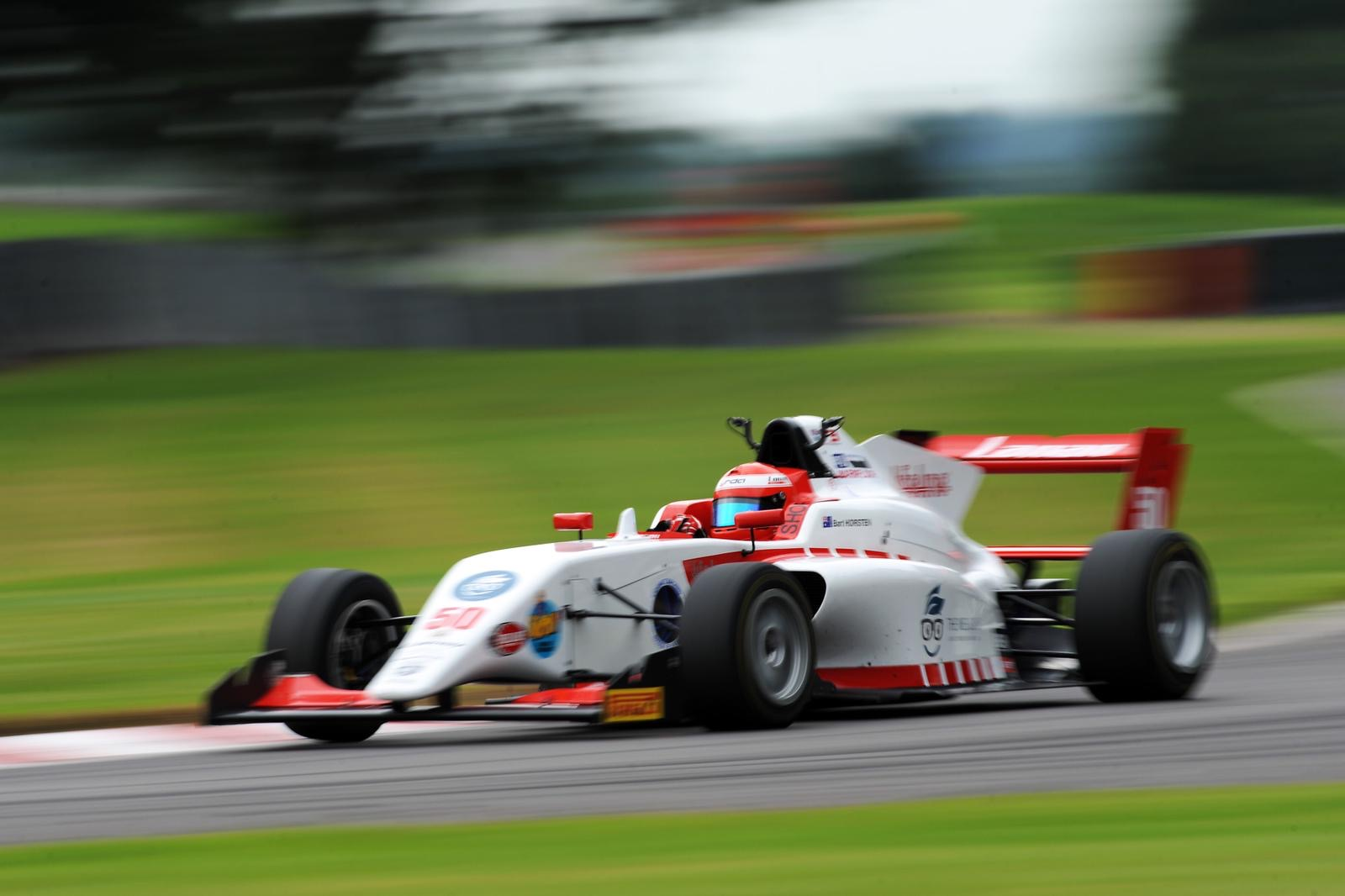
Horsten driving the Lanan Racing British F3 car around Oulton Park

For 2021, Horsten announced that he would be returning to British F3, partnering Reece Ushijima and Sebastian Alvarez at Hitech GP. He started his season off with two points finishes and a retirement, which came when fighting for the race lead with Brit Ayrton Simmons, at the Brands Hatch circuit. Horsten would score his first podium of the season in race 1 of the following round at Silverstone, setting the fastest lap in addition. At the fourth round of the season, Horsten achieved two pole positions, but was unable to capitalise on his starting position, finishing races one and two in fifth and fourth. Horsten would have to wait until the reversed-grid race at the sixth round of the campaign to score his second podium, finishing third after having started from ninth place on the grid. After initial second-placed Branden Lee Oxley was disqualified for causing a collision, Horsten was promoted to second. At the penultimate round at Oulton Park he would finish second in race two, closing the gap to his rivals in the fight for second place in the standings before the season finale at Donington Park. Horsten would be unable to capitalize, ending up sixth in the standings.

=== BMW M2 Cup Germany ===
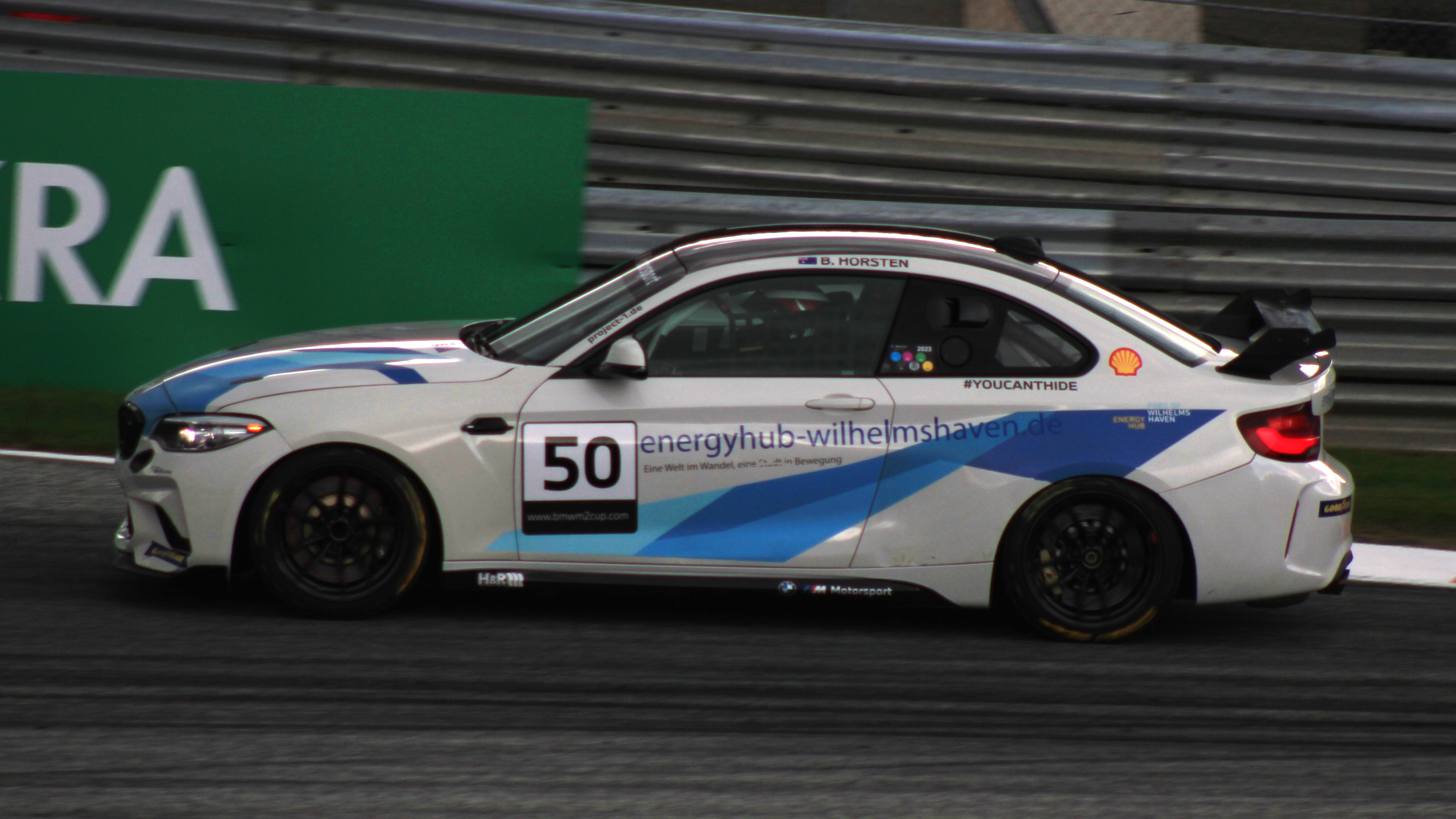
Horsten driving in the BMW M2 Cup Germany at the Red Bull Ring in 2023

Horsten would make his first step into GT racing by competing in the 2022 BMW M2 Cup Germany, where he'd qualify second and take his first podium in the third round at the Nürburgring. The following race weekend at Circuit de Spa-Francorchamps, Horsten would lead the second race before retiring after a collision however he'd bounce back at the Hockenheimring where following a car issue in qualifying and dropping to last at the start of the second race, he would drive through to third on track.

For 2023, Horsten returned to the BMW M2 Cup Germany taking fastest lap in both races at the season opener in Oschersleben and a third place finish. The next round he would lead the first race until a slow puncture caused him to retire with two laps to go but would respond with his first win in the series a day later. He'd then score podiums in the next three races including a victory in a rain shortened race at the Nurburgring. Horsten would maintain his consistency over the next few rounds to keep him in championship contention including recovering from a seventh place qualifying in Sachsenring to finish on the podium. At the final race of the year, he received a penalty for being involved in an incident on the final lap demoting him from second to eleventh, ultimately costing him second in the championship.

=== BRSCC Supersport Endurance Cup ===
Horsten competed in the Geoff Steel Racing-prepared BMW 1M in the BRSCC Supersport Endurance Cup during the 2023 and 2024 seasons, serving as both co-driver and driver coach to teammate Keir McConomy.

The pairing achieved multiple race victories and podium finishes during the 2023 season, although mechanical failures at Snetterton Circuit and Brands Hatch prevented them from winning the championship.

In 2024, Horsten and McConomy won the Pro-A class title and finished third overall in the multi-class championship standings.

=== NLS (Nürburgring Langstrecken-Serie) ===
Horsten obtained his Permit A racing licence for the Nürburgring Langstrecken-Serie at the 2025 NLS 7+8 double-header event. Despite mixed weather conditions, including rain and fog, he qualified second in class and finished third in the Sunday race, securing his first NLS podium.

=== Nichols N1A Development Driver ===
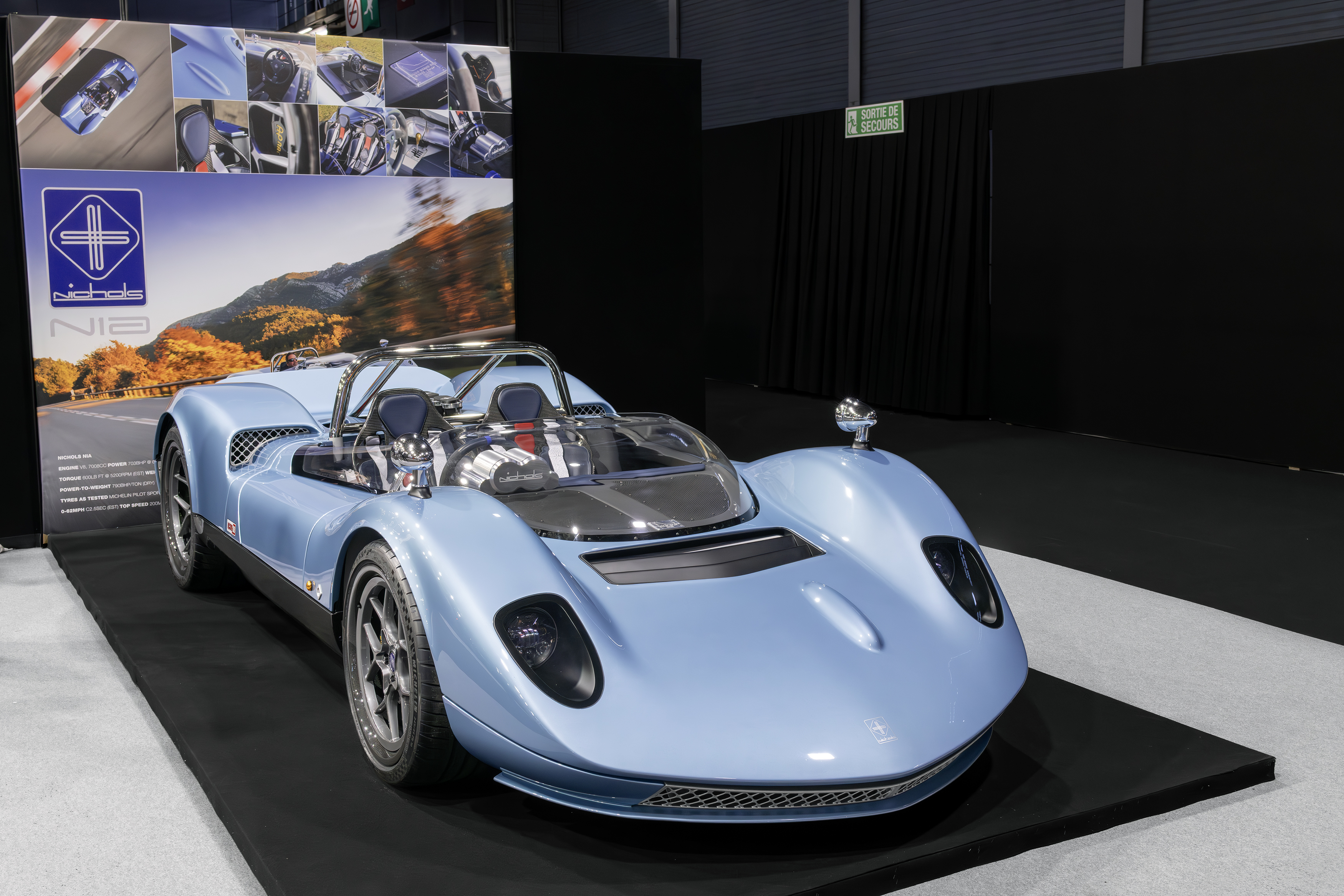
Nichols NIA ICON 88 at Retromobile 2026

Horsten has served as Senior Development Driver for the Nichols Cars N1A, a lightweight sports car powered by a naturally aspirated 7.0-litre V8 engine.

His role has included testing and development of the vehicle's suspension, braking system and overall handling characteristics at circuits including Goodwood Motor Circuit and Circuito de Guadix.

The N1A was designed under the direction of Steve Nichols, the former Formula One designer best known for the McLaren MP4/4. Production of the N1A is planned to be limited to 15 examples, commemorating the MP4/4's 15 Grand Prix victories.

== Racing record ==
=== Career summary ===
Season	Series	Team	Races	Wins	Poles	F/laps	Podiums	Points	Position
2017	Australian Formula Ford Series	Fastlane Racing	6	0	0	0	0	14	23rd
2017	Victorian Formula Ford Fiesta Championship	Fastlane Racing	3	0	0	0	0	23	29th
2017	New South Wales Formula Ford Fiesta Championship	Fastlane Racing	2	0	0	0	0	0	NC
2018	Australian Formula Ford Championship	Fastlane Racing/Tandersport	18	0	0	1	3	128	9th
2018	New South Wales Formula Ford Fiesta Championship	Fastlane Racing	6	0	0	1	3	111	13th
2018	Victorian Formula Ford Fiesta Championship	N/A	9	0	0	0	0	46	23rd
2019	F4 British Championship	Arden	30	1	0	1	10	275.5	5th
2020	BRDC British Formula 3 Championship	Lanan Racing	24	0	0	1	3	288	10th
2021	GB3 Championship	Hitech Grand Prix	24	0	2	4	3	333	6th
2022	BMW M2 Cup Germany	Project 1	11	0	0	0	1	123	4th
2023	BMW M2 Cup Germany	Project 1	12	2	1	2	7	171	**3rd**
2023	BRSCC Supersport Endurance Cup	Geoff Steel Racing	5	3	4	4	4	144	**2nd**
2024	BRSCC Supersport Endurance Cup	Geoff Steel Racing	6	4	6	4	5	204	**1st**
2025	Britcar Endurance Championship	Geoff Steel Racing	1	0	0	0	1	25	NC
2025	Nürburgring Langstrecken-Serie - BMW M240i	Giti Tire Motorsport by WS Racing	2	0	0	0	1	11	NC
2025	Nürburgring Langstrecken-Serie - VT2-RWD	Giti Tire Motorsport by WS Racing	1	0	0	0	0	3	NC
2026	Nürburgring Langstrecken-Serie - BMW M240i	Giti Tire Motorsport by WS Racing							

=== Complete F4 British Championship results ===
(key) (Races in bold indicate pole position) (Races in italics indicate fastest lap)

Year	Team	1	2	3	4	5	6	7	8	9	10	11	12	13	14	15	16	17	18	19	20	21	22	23	24	25	26	27	28	29	30	DC	Points
2019	Arden	BHI; 1; 5	BHI; 2 Ret	BHI; 3; 6	DON; 1; 3	DON; 2; 1	DON; 3; 8	THR1; 1; 4	THR1; 2; 3	THR1; 3; 7	CRO; 1; 2	CRO; 2; 3	CRO; 3; 3	OUL; 1; 3	OUL; 2; 8	OUL; 3; 7	SNE; 1; 5	SNE; 2; 10	SNE; 3; 2	THR2; 1; 13	THR2; 2 Ret	THR2; 3; 4	KNO; 1; 6	KNO; 2; 9	KNO; 3; 10	SIL; 1 Ret	SIL; 2; 5	SIL; 3; 2	BHGP; 1; 5	BHGP; 2; 2	BHGP; 3; 5	5th	275.5

=== Complete BRDC British F3/GB3 Championship results ===
(key) (Races in bold indicate pole position) (Races in italics indicate fastest lap)

Year	Team	1	2	3	4	5	6	7	8	9	10	11	12	13	14	15	16	17	18	19	20	21	22	23	24	DC	Points
2020	Lanan Racing	OUL; 1; 12	OUL; 2; 3	OUL; 3; 5	OUL; 4 Ret	DON1; 1; 11	DON1; 2; 4^{4}	DON1; 3; 14	BRH; 1; 13	BRH; 2; 3	BRH; 3; 7	BRH; 4; 7	DON2; 1; 4	DON2; 2; 13	DON2; 3; 7	SNE; 1; 8	SNE; 2; 8	SNE; 3; 10	SNE; 4; 9	DON3; 1; 11	DON3; 2; 10^{6}	DON3; 3; 7	SIL; 1; 8	SIL; 2; 2^{8}	SIL; 3 Ret	10th	288
2021	Hitech Grand Prix	BRH; 1; 4	BRH; 2 Ret	BRH; 3; 8^{7}	SIL1; 1; 3	SIL1; 2; 6	SIL1; 3 Ret	DON1; 1; 8	DON1; 2 DSQ	DON1; 3; 7^{10}	**SPA**; **1**; 5	**SPA**; **2**; 4	SPA; 3; 9^{7}	SNE; 1; 10	SNE; 2; 12	SNE; 3; 16^{2}	SIL2; 1; 7	SIL2; 2; 5	SIL2; 3; 2^{7}	OUL; 1; 4	OUL; 2; 2	OUL; 3; 14	DON2; 1; 18	DON2; 2; 4	DON2; 3; 11^{9}	6th	333

=== Complete BMW M2 Cup Germany results ===
(key) (Races in bold indicate pole position) (Races in italics indicate fastest lap)

Year	1	2	3	4	5	6	7	8	9	10	11	12	13	Pos	Points
2022	LAU; 1; 6	LAU; 2; 11	NOR; 1; 7	NOR; 2; 4	NÜR; 1 C	NÜR; 2; 3	SPA; 1; 4	SPA; 2 Ret	RBR; 1; 6	RBR; 2 C	HOC; 1; 7	HOC; 2; 6	HOC; 3; 4	4th	123
2023	OSC; 1; 4	OSC; 2; 3	NOR; 1 Ret	**NOR**; **2**; 1	NÜR; 1; 3	NÜR; 2; 1	LAU; 1; 2	LAU; 2; 4	SAC; 1; 3	SAC; 2; 2	RBR; 1; 4	RBR; 2; 11		3rd	171

=== Complete BRSCC Supersport Endurance Cup results ===
(key) (Races in bold indicate pole position) (Races in italics indicate fastest lap)

Year	1	2	3	4	5	6	7	Pos	Points
2023	**SNE1**; 1	**SIL**1; 1	**DON**; 1	SNE2; 3		**SIL2**; DSQ		2nd	144
2024	**SIL1**; 1	**SNE**; 1	**CRO**; 1	**DON**; 2		**BRH**; 1	**SIL2**; DNS	1st	204
