= 2019 Australian Formula Ford Series =

Motor racing competition

The 2019 Australian Formula Ford Series was an Australian motor racing competition for Formula Ford and Formula Ford 1600 racing cars. The series, which was organised by the Formula Ford Association Inc, was the 50th edition of the Australian Formula Ford Series.

The championship was won by Angelo Mouzouris while the Formula Ford 1600 (Kent) class was won by Tim Hamilton. As a consequence of the disruption of the COVID-19 pandemic, the 2020 edition of the series would be cancelled. The championship would make its return in 2021.

== Calendar ==
The following circuits hosted a round of the 2019 championship.

Rd	Circuit	Dates	Maps
1	Sydney Motorsport Park (Eastern Creek, New South Wales)	7–9 April	2019 Australian Formula Ford Series is located in Australia
2	Queensland Raceway (Willowbank, Queensland)	4–5 May	2019 Australian Formula Ford Series is located in Australia
3	(Victoria (state)) Winton Motor Raceway (Winton, Victoria)	25–26 May	2019 Australian Formula Ford Series is located in Australia
4	The Bend Motorsport Park (Tailem Bend, South Australia)	22–23 June	2019 Australian Formula Ford Series is located in Australia
5	(Victoria (state)) Sandown Raceway (Melbourne, Victoria)	20–21 July	2019 Australian Formula Ford Series is located in Australia
6	Wakefield Park Raceway (Goulburn, New South Wales)	7–8 September	2019 Australian Formula Ford Series is located in Australia
7	(Victoria (state)) Phillip Island Grand Prix Circuit (Phillip Island, Victoria)	28–29 September	2019 Australian Formula Ford Series is located in Australia

Designates Formula Ford 1600 (Kent) class rounds

== Teams and drivers ==
Team	Chassis	No	Driver	Class	Rounds
Speco/VHT	Spectrum 011	1	(Australia) Brendan Jones	K	7
Sonic Motor Racing Services	Mygale SJ18	2	(Australia) Angelo Mouzouris		All
Sonic Motor Racing Services	Mygale SJ11a	3	(Australia) Courtney Prince		All
Sonic Motor Racing Services	Mygale SJ10a	4	(Australia) Jay Hanson		All
Sonic Motor Racing Services	Mygale SJ10a	5	(New Zealand) Callum Hedge		All
Sonic Motor Racing Services	Mygale SJ15a	77	(Australia) Kyle Gurton		3, 5, 7
Borland Racing Developments	Spectrum 015	6	(Australia) Paul Zsidy		1, 3, 5–7
Borland Racing Developments	Spectrum 015	97	(Australia) Liam McLellan		1–4
Team Soutar Motorsport	Mygale SJ13	10	(Australia) Zac Soutar		All
Dirt Vision	Listec WIL-013	13	(Australia) William Liston		6
CHE Racing Team	Mygale SJ10a	14	(Australia) Lachlan Mineeff		All
CHE Racing Team	Mygale SJ12	47	(Australia) Tom Sargent		All
Greg Fahey	Van Diemen RF04	14	(Australia) Greg Fahey	K	2
Junior Racing Development	Spectrum 015	14	(Australia) Matt Holmes		7
Ellery Motorsport	Spectrum 010	16	(Australia) George Thornton	K	7
Ellery Motorsport	Spectrum 06b	22	(Australia) Douglas Williams	K	7
Anglo Australian Motorsport	Spirit WL11	17	(Australia) Lachlan Ward		1, 6
Anglo Australian Motorsport	Van Diemen RF91	32	(Australia) Mitch Gatenby	K	1
Anglo Australian Motorsport	Mygale	40	(Australia) Dan Holihan		1, 6
Smashmasters Panel Beaters Geelong	Spectrum 06b	17	(Australia) Peter Fitzgerald	K	7
Ultra Tune Hawthorn	Mygale	19	(Australia) Spencer Ackerman		5–7
uAvionix Australia	Mygale SJ13	19	(Australia) Spencer Ackerman		6
BF Racing	Mygale SJ10	23	(Australia) Hank Perkins		1–4
BF Racing	Mygale SJ09a	88	(Australia) Harrison Goodman		1–4, 7
Bates Advanced Driving	Mygale	24	(Australia) Zach Bates		6
Di Biase Cabinetry	Spectrum 011b	27	(Australia) Paul Di Biase		4
Ian Shelby-James	Mygale SJ11	29	(Australia) Ian Shelby-James		4
Timothy Edwards	Spectrum	32	(Australia) Timothy Edwards		5, 7
Jake Donaldson Racing	Spectrum 011d	35	(Australia) Jake Donaldson		1–3, 6
Synergy Motorsport	Spectrum 014b	36	(Australia) Cody Burcher		All
	Van Diemen	40	(Australia) Richard Davison	K	7
TCM Motorsport	Van Diemen RF06	44	(Australia) Samuel Woodland		4
TCM Motorsport	Mygale SJ09a	53	(Australia) Matthew Woodland		4
Excel Building Services	Spectrum	44	(Australia) Jordyn Sinni		7
Team Costello Racing	Van Diemen RF01	45	(Australia) Jarrod Costello	K	1–2, 7
	Van Diemen RF90	46	(Australia) James Meaden	K	7
SKT Motorsport	Mygale SJ04	48	(Australia) Scott Tidyman	K	1, 7
Motorsport Connections	Van Diemen	51	(Australia) Shane Nichols	K	1
Bargwanna Motorsport	Spectrum 014b	53	(Australia) Ben Bargwanna		1, 5–7
KMB Motorsport	Spectrum 014b	60	(Australia) Cody Donald		1–3, 5–7
Ben D'Alia	Spectrum 012b	66	(Australia) Ben D'Alia		3, 5, 7
	Van Diemen RF86	72	(Australia) Anthony Mann	K	7
John Pereira	Van Diemen RF92	77	(Australia) John Pereira	K	1, 7
Team Redline	Mygale SJ11	78	(Australia) Andrew Petrou		5
Donate Life	Swift 93F	80	(Australia) Jason Liddell	K	1, 7
Tim Hamilton	Spectrum 010b	87	(Australia) Tim Hamilton	K	1–2, 7
Josh Glinn Racing	Comtec K018	94	(Australia) Josh Glinn	K	1, 7
Adrian Lazzaro	Spectrum 011	95	(Australia) Adrian Lazzaro		5
Nicholson Motorsport	Spectrum 011b	98	(Australia) Conor Nicholson		All

== Results and standings ==
=== Results ===
Rd	Race	Circuit	Pole position	Fastest lap	Winning driver	Winning team
1	1	(New South Wales) Sydney Motorsport Park	(Australia) Tom Sargent	(Australia) Zac Soutar	(Australia) Zac Soutar	Team Soutar Motorsport
1	2	(New South Wales) Sydney Motorsport Park		(Australia) Tom Sargent	(Australia) Tom Sargent	CHE Racing Team
1	3	(New South Wales) Sydney Motorsport Park		(Australia) Angelo Mouzouris	(New Zealand) Callum Hedge	Sonic Motor Racing Services
2	1	Queensland Raceway	(Australia) Cody Burcher	(Australia) Liam McLellan	(New Zealand) Callum Hedge	Sonic Motor Racing Services
2	2	Queensland Raceway		(Australia) Jake Donaldson	(New Zealand) Callum Hedge	Sonic Motor Racing Services
2	3	Queensland Raceway		(Australia) Angelo Mouzouris	(Australia) Zac Soutar	Team Soutar Motorsport
3	1	(Victoria (state)) Winton Motor Raceway	(New Zealand) Callum Hedge	(Australia) Angelo Mouzouris	(Australia) Angelo Mouzouris	Sonic Motor Racing Services
3	2	(Victoria (state)) Winton Motor Raceway		(Australia) Angelo Mouzouris	(Australia) Angelo Mouzouris	Sonic Motor Racing Services
3	3	(Victoria (state)) Winton Motor Raceway		(New Zealand) Callum Hedge	(Australia) Angelo Mouzouris	Sonic Motor Racing Services
4	1	(South Australia) The Bend Motorsport Park	(Australia) Angelo Mouzouris	(Australia) Zac Soutar	(Australia) Tom Sargent	CHE Racing Team
4	2	(South Australia) The Bend Motorsport Park		(Australia) Angelo Mouzouris	(Australia) Angelo Mouzouris	Sonic Motor Racing Services
4	3	(South Australia) The Bend Motorsport Park		(Australia) Tom Sargent	(Australia) Lachlan Mineeff	CHE Racing Team
5	1	(Victoria (state)) Sandown Raceway	(Australia) Zac Soutar	(Australia) Cody Burcher	(Australia) Lachlan Mineeff	CHE Racing Team
5	2	(Victoria (state)) Sandown Raceway		(Australia) Cody Burcher	(Australia) Zac Soutar	Team Soutar Motorsport
5	3	(Victoria (state)) Sandown Raceway		(Australia) Cody Donald	(Australia) Zac Soutar	Team Soutar Motorsport
6	1	(New South Wales) Wakefield Park Raceway	(New Zealand) Callum Hedge	(Australia) Angelo Mouzouris	(Australia) Cody Burcher	Synergy Motorsport
6	2	(New South Wales) Wakefield Park Raceway		(Australia) Angelo Mouzouris	(Australia) Angelo Mouzouris	Sonic Motor Racing Services
6	3	(New South Wales) Wakefield Park Raceway		(Australia) Angelo Mouzouris	(Australia) Angelo Mouzouris	Sonic Motor Racing Services
7	1	(Victoria (state)) Phillip Island Grand Prix Circuit	(Australia) Zac Soutar	(Australia) Jay Hanson	(Australia) Zac Soutar	Team Soutar Motorsport
7	2	(Victoria (state)) Phillip Island Grand Prix Circuit		(Australia) Cody Burcher	(Australia) Angelo Mouzouris	Sonic Motor Racing Services
7	3	(Victoria (state)) Phillip Island Grand Prix Circuit		(Australia) Jay Hanson	(Australia) Jay Hanson	Sonic Motor Racing Services

=== Standings ===
Pos.	Driver	(New South Wales) SYD			(Queensland) QUE			(Victoria (state)) WIN			(South Australia) BEN			(Victoria (state)) SAN			(New South Wales) WAK			(Victoria (state)) PHI			Pts
Pos.	Driver	R1	R2	R3	R1	R2	R3	R1	R2	R3	R1	R2	R3	R1	R2	R3	R1	R2	R3	R1	R2	R3	Pts
1	(Australia) Angelo Mouzouris	7	4	4	7	5	2	1	1	1	3	1	4	Ret	7	3	2	1	1	4	1	11	295
2	(Australia) Zac Soutar	1	2	3	5	2	1	16	8	6	5	7	3	Ret	1	1	4	2	5	1	5	2	277
3	(Australia) Tom Sargent	2	1	2	3	3	8	2	12	8	1	5	2	Wth	Wth	Wth	5	4	3	2	3	25	235
4	(New Zealand) Callum Hedge	3	3	1	1	1	Ret	7	6	2	2	3	6	Ret	6	15	3	9	7	3	4	8	230
5	(Australia) Lachlan Mineeff	13	8	6	10	7	3	6	7	9	4	2	1	1	3	4	10	5	6	7	7	4	228
6	(Australia) Cody Burcher	5	7	16	2	6	4	8	4	4	8	6	8	Ret	2	Ret	1	3	2	6	2	9	217
7	(Australia) Jay Hanson	4	5	8	11	10	9	3	9	5	6	4	5	8	16	2	Ret	8	4	5	6	1	209
8	(Australia) Courtney Prince	6	6	5	6	9	7	14	10	10	7	9	7	4	Ret	8	7	6	8	9	10	6	175
9	(Australia) Cody Donald	Ret	11	7	8	11	6	10	3	3				DSQ	Ret	Ret	Ret	11	10	11	16	3	121
10	(Australia) Harrison Goodman	11	12	11	13	12	10	9	13	14	Ret	12	10	9	11	10	12	12	Ret	16	13	14	110
11	(Australia) Conor Nicholson	12	15	13	12	13	12	11	14	15	10	11	9	7	10	11	13	13	13	17	17	16	101
12	(Australia) Liam McLellan	Ret	10	12	4	8	13	4	2	11	9	10	11							7	7	4	85
13	(Australia) Spencer Ackerman													5	8	6	8	7	9	12	8	7	83
14	(Australia) Jake Donaldson	9	9	9	9	4	5	17	5	7							6	Ret	14				82
15	(Australia) Hank Perkins	15	17	23	14	14	11	15	16	16	11	13	13										25
16	(Australia) Dan Holihan	14	16	15													14	17	Ret				15
17	(Australia) Ben D'Alia							5	Ret	13				2	4	7				10	12	10	14
18	(Australia) Kyle Gurton							12	11	12				6	9	9				15	11	12	13
19	(Australia) Paul Zsidy	16	18	14				13	15	Ret				13	15	14	17	18	15	19	24	19	9
guest drivers ineligible for points
-	(Australia) Ben Bargwanna	8	14	10										3	5	5	9	10	11	8	9	5	0
-	(Australia) Lachlan Ward	10	13	Ret													11	19	Ret				0
-	(Australia) Shane Nichols	19	22	20																			0
-	(Australia) William Liston																15	16	Ret				0
-	(Australia) Zach Bates																16	14	Ret				0
-	(Australia) Cooper Allen																Ret	15	12				0
-	(Australia) Samuel Woodland										12	15	DNS										0
-	(Australia) Matthew Woodland										13	16	15										0
-	(Australia) Ian Shelby-James										14	Ret	16										0
-	(Australia) Paul Di Biase										Ret	Ret	Ret										0
-	(Australia) Adrian Lazzaro													10	12	Ret							0
-	(Australia) Matt Holmes																			13	20	13	0
-	(Australia) Jordyn Sinni																			14	14	15	0
-	(Australia) Timothy Edwards													11	13	13				18	15	18	0
-	(Australia) Andrew Petrou													12	14	12				20	DNS	17	0
Pos.	Driver	R1	R2	R3	R1	R2	R3	R1	R2	R3	R1	R2	R3	R1	R2	R3	R1	R2	R3	R1	R2	R3	Pts
Pos.	Driver	(New South Wales) SYD			(Queensland) QUE			(Victoria (state)) WIN			(South Australia) BEN			(Victoria (state)) SAN			(New South Wales) WAK			(Victoria (state)) PHI			Pts

==== Kent class ====
Pos.	Driver	(New South Wales) SYD			(Queensland) QUE			(Victoria (state)) PHI			Pts
Pos.	Driver	R1	R2	R3	R1	R2	R3	R1	R2	R3	Pts
1	(Australia) Tim Hamilton	17	19	17	16	15	14	21	21	20	173
2	(Australia) Jarrod Costello	18	20	18	15	16	15	24	18	23	153
3	(Australia) Scott Tidyman	Ret	21	19				27	27	26	69
4	(Australia) John Pereira	22	24	21				32	32	Ret	57
5	(Australia) Jason Liddell	20	Ret	Ret				31	25	27	52
6	(Australia) Josh Glinn	Ret	25	24				DNS	28	30	44
guest drivers ineligible for points
-	(Australia) Mitch Gatenby	21	23	22							0
-	(Australia) Greg Fahey				17	17	16				0
-	(Australia) Richard Davison							22	20	22	0
-	(Australia) Brendan Jones							23	24	21	0
-	(Australia) Peter Fitzgerald							25	29	25	0
-	(Australia) Anthony Mann							26	30	Ret	0
-	(Australia) George Thornton							28	22	28	0
-	(Australia) Douglas Williams							29	31	Ret	0
-	(Australia) James Meaden							30	26	29	0
Pos.	Driver	R1	R2	R3	R1	R2	R3	R1	R2	R3	Pts
Pos.	Driver	(New South Wales) SYD			(Queensland) QUE			(Victoria (state)) PHI			Pts
