= 2018 Australian Formula Ford Series =

Motor racing competition

The 2018 Australian Formula Ford Series was an Australian motor racing competition for Formula Ford and Formula Ford 1600 Racing Cars. The series, which was organised by the Formula Ford Association Inc, was the 49th Australian Formula Ford Series.

The Formula Ford (Duratec) class was won by Hunter McElrea driving a Mygale SJ10A and the Formula Ford 1600 (Kent) class by Dylan Fahey driving a Van Diemen.

== Teams and drivers ==
Team	Chassis	No	Driver	Class	Rounds
Speco/VHT	Spectrum 011	1	(Australia) Brendan Jones	K	4, 6
Sonic Motor Racing Services	Mygale SJ10a	2	(New Zealand) Hunter McElrea		All
Sonic Motor Racing Services	Mygale SJ2011a	3	(Australia) Courtney Prince		All
Sonic Motor Racing Services	Mygale SJ	4	(Australia) Angelo Mouzouris		All
Sonic Motor Racing Services	Mygale SJ1Sa-00	5	(Australia) Hamish Ribarits		All
Zsidy Racing	Spectrum 015	6	(Australia) Paul Zsidy		All
DYFA Plumbing	Van Diemen FF	8	(Australia) Paul Fahey	K	2, 7
Whodeany Racing	Spectrum 015	8	(Australia) James Dean		6
Momentum Landscaping	Spectrum 07	9	(Australia) Byron Thomas	K	4
Team Soutar Motorsport	Mygale SJ13	10	(Australia) Zac Soutar		All
Fastlane Racing	Stealth S3D	12	(Australia) Bart Horsten		1, 3–7
Fastlane Racing	Stealth S3D	55	(Australia) Bailey Grech		1
Listec Race Cars	Listec Wil-05	13	(Australia) Josh Buchan	K	7
Southern Star Truck Centre	Mygale SJ10a	14	(Australia) Lachlan Mineeff		All
	Spectrum 015	14	(Australia) Matthew Holmes		4
Kinetic Motorsport	Mygale SJ18a	16	(Australia) Tommy Smith		1, 5–6
uAvionix Australia	Mygale	16	(Australia) Finlay Allen		3
	Spectrum 014	17	(New Zealand) Callum Hedge		2–3
Smashmasters Panel Beaters Geelong	Spectrum 06b	17	(Australia) Peter Fitzgerald	K	4, 6
	Van Diemen	18	(Australia) Dylan Fahey	K	4
	Mygale	19	(Australia) Spencer Ackermann		4
Greg Woodrow	Mygale	20	(Australia) Gavin Dumas		5
Jones Motorsport	Spectrum 014d	21	(Australia) Harri Jones		1
	Spectrum 011b	21	(Australia) Paul Di Biase		5
AEWA		24	(Australia) Dave Wood	K	7
Sanyo GT Enterprises	Van Diemen RF86	26	(Australia) George Thornton	K	6
	Mygale SJ2012	28	(Australia) John Blanchard		4–5
BF Racing	Mygale SJ11a	29	(Australia) Nathan Herne		All
BF Racing	Mygale SJ12a	73	(Australia) Cameron Shields		1–3, 5
BF Racing	Mygale SJ09a	88	(Australia) Harrison Goodman		All
Jake Donaldson Racing	Spectrum 011d	35	(Australia) Jake Donaldson		1–4
Borland Racing Developments	Spectrum 012b	36	(Australia) Cody Burcher		3–4, 6–7
Anglo Australian Motorsport	Mygale SJ09	40	(Australia) Dan Holihan		3, 7
Anglo Australian Motorsport	Spectrum 011	91	(Australia) Josh Behn		1
Genesis Offices	Mondiale M89S	41	(Australia) Robert Rowe	K	2, 4, 7
	Van Diemen FA73	41	(Australia) Andrew Barron	K	6
		42	(Australia) Harrison Blanchard	K	4
TanderSport	Stealth 53D	42	(Australia) Leanne Tander	K	6
TanderSport	Stealth 53D	55	(Australia) Samuel Dicker		5
CHE Racing Team	Mygale SJ2012a	47	(Australia) Tom Sargent		3–7
Black Swan Security	Spectrum 014	57	(Australia) Jackson Burton		1, 3–4, 6
Gallagher Insurance/WDS	Listec WIL-013	58	(Australia) Nicholas Padjen		3
Cody Donald Racing	Spectrum 014b	60	(Australia) Cody Donald		1, 4–6
Moart/D'Alias Bakery/RGI	Spectrum 012	66	(Australia) Benjamin D'Alia		1–6
SignFX Racing	Spectrum	68	(Australia) Blaine Grills		4, 6
Philip Marrinon	Galloway HG5	70	(Australia) Philip Marrinon	K	4, 6
Andy Simpson	Mygale SJ09	76	(Australia) Andy Simpson		5
Jason Liddell	Swift SC93F	80	(Australia) Jason Liddell	K	2, 4, 7
Tim Hamilton	Spectrum 010b	87	(Australia) Tim Hamilton	K	2, 4, 7
	Spectrum	91	(Australia) Christopher Slusarski		5
Joshua Glinn Racing		94	(Australia) Joshua Glinn	K	7
Lazzaro Concrete Works	Spectrum 011	95	(Australia) Adrian Lazzaro		1–3
Jimmy Bailey	Spectrum 06b	96	(Australia) Jimmy Bailey	K	2
Liam McLellan	Spectrum 015	97	(Australia) Liam McLellan		1, 3–6
Granite Consulting	Spectrum 011b	98	(Australia) Conor Nicholson		4–7
PLG Gearcutting	Citation	99	(Australia) John Connelly	K	4, 6
	Spectrum 011c	99	(Australia) Matt Roslier		5

== Calendar ==
The Formula Ford Association (FFA) announced a one-round calendar extension for the 2018 season. It also marked a return to the Supercars Championship support bill at The Bend Motorsport Park.

Round	Circuit	Dates	Map
1	(Victoria (state)) Winton Motor Raceway (Winton, Victoria)	9-11 March	2018 Australian Formula Ford Series is located in Australia
2	Queensland Raceway (Willowbank, Queensland)	20-22 April	2018 Australian Formula Ford Series is located in Australia
3	Wakefield Park Raceway (Goulburn, New South Wales)	25-27 May	2018 Australian Formula Ford Series is located in Australia
4	(Victoria (state)) Sandown Raceway (Melbourne, Victoria)	20-22 July	2018 Australian Formula Ford Series is located in Australia
5	The Bend Motorsport Park (Tailem Bend, South Australia)	24-26 August	2018 Australian Formula Ford Series is located in Australia
6	(Victoria (state)) Phillip Island Grand Prix Circuit (Phillip Island, Victoria)	28-30 September	2018 Australian Formula Ford Series is located in Australia
7	Sydney Motorsport Park (Eastern Creek, New South Wales)	26-28 October	2018 Australian Formula Ford Series is located in Australia

Designates Formula Ford 1600 (Kent) class rounds

== Season summary ==
Rd	Race	Circuit	Pole position	Fastest lap	Winning driver	Winning team
1	1	(Victoria (state)) Winton Motor Raceway	(New Zealand) Hunter McElrea	(Australia) Liam McLellan	(New Zealand) Hunter McElrea	Sonic Motor Racing Services
1	2	(Victoria (state)) Winton Motor Raceway		(Australia) Hamish Ribarits	(New Zealand) Hunter McElrea	Sonic Motor Racing Services
1	3	(Victoria (state)) Winton Motor Raceway		(New Zealand) Hunter McElrea	(New Zealand) Hunter McElrea	Sonic Motor Racing Services
2	1	Queensland Raceway	(Australia) Hamish Ribarits	(Australia) Nathan Herne	(Australia) Hamish Ribarits	Sonic Motor Racing Services
2	2	Queensland Raceway		(Australia) Hamish Ribarits	(New Zealand) Hunter McElrea	Sonic Motor Racing Services
2	3	Queensland Raceway		(New Zealand) Hunter McElrea	(Australia) Hamish Ribarits	Sonic Motor Racing Services
3	1	(New South Wales) Wakefield Park Raceway	(New Zealand) Hunter McElrea	(Australia) Bart Horsten	(New Zealand) Hunter McElrea	Sonic Motor Racing Services
3	2	(New South Wales) Wakefield Park Raceway		(Australia) Hamish Ribarits	(New Zealand) Hunter McElrea	Sonic Motor Racing Services
3	3	(New South Wales) Wakefield Park Raceway		(New Zealand) Hunter McElrea	(New Zealand) Hunter McElrea	Sonic Motor Racing Services
4	1	(Queensland) Sandown Raceway	(New Zealand) Hunter McElrea	(Australia) Zac Soutar	(Australia) Liam McLellan	Liam McLellan
4	2	(Queensland) Sandown Raceway		(New Zealand) Hunter McElrea	(New Zealand) Hunter McElrea	Sonic Motor Racing Services
4	3	(Queensland) Sandown Raceway		(Australia) Nathan Herne	(Australia) Zac Soutar	Team Soutar Motorsport
5	1	(South Australia) The Bend Motorsport Park	(Australia) Hamish Ribarits	(Australia) Cody Donald	(New Zealand) Hunter McElrea	Sonic Motor Racing Services
5	2	(South Australia) The Bend Motorsport Park		(New Zealand) Hunter McElrea	(New Zealand) Hunter McElrea	Sonic Motor Racing Services
5	3	(South Australia) The Bend Motorsport Park		(New Zealand) Hunter McElrea	(New Zealand) Hunter McElrea	Sonic Motor Racing Services
6	1	(Victoria (state)) Phillip Island Grand Prix Circuit	(Australia) Hamish Ribarits	(Australia) Nathan Herne	(New Zealand) Hunter McElrea	Sonic Motor Racing Services
6	2	(Victoria (state)) Phillip Island Grand Prix Circuit		(Australia) Angelo Mouzouris	(Australia) Hamish Ribarits	Sonic Motor Racing Services
6	3	(Victoria (state)) Phillip Island Grand Prix Circuit		(Australia) Tom Sargent	(Australia) Hamish Ribarits	Sonic Motor Racing Services
7	1	(New South Wales) Sydney Motorsport Park	(Australia) Hamish Ribarits	(Australia) Hamish Ribarits	(Australia) Hamish Ribarits	Sonic Motor Racing Services
7	2	(New South Wales) Sydney Motorsport Park		(New Zealand) Hunter McElrea	(New Zealand) Hunter McElrea	Sonic Motor Racing Services
7	3	(New South Wales) Sydney Motorsport Park		(Australia) Hamish Ribarits	(Australia) Nathan Herne	BF Racing

== Championship standings ==
Pos.	Driver	(Victoria (state)) WIN			(Queensland) QUE			(New South Wales) WAK			(Victoria (state)) SAN			(South Australia) BEN			(Victoria (state)) PHI			(New South Wales) SYD			Pts
Pos.	Driver	R1	R2	R3	R1	R2	R3	R1	R2	R3	R1	R2	R3	R1	R2	R3	R1	R2	R3	R1	R2	R3	Pts
1	(New Zealand) Hunter McElrea	1	1	1	3	1	8	1	1	1	8	1	3	1	1	1	1	Ret	5	3	1	7	321
2	(Australia) Hamish Ribarits	3	2	2	1	2	1	3	2	3	4	3	13	3	5	6	4	1	1	1	2	14	306
3	(Australia) Zac Soutar	7	6	7	6	4	2	11	10	10	2	4	1	5	7	3	2	3	3	9	5	4	239
4	(Australia) Nathan Herne	6	12	3	4	3	Ret	9	8	6	3	13	5	7	6	5	3	2	2	2	3	1	236
5	(Australia) Lachlan Mineeff	11	9	8	11	8	12	4	4	7	10	8	8	8	8	9	8	4	13	7	6	5	172
6	(Australia) Angelo Mouzouris	9	5	13	7	7	9	6	7	8	5	2	4	Ret	12	8	Ret	9	6	5	11	2	159
7	(Australia) Liam McLellan	2	4	10	5	6	3	17	12	Ret	1	6	2	9	4	4	6	15	7				158
8	(Australia) Tom Sargent							10	Ret	15	18	7	7	6	2	2	10	6	4	4	4	3	138
9	(Australia) Bart Horsten	12	8	9				2	3	2	6	Ret	9	10	9	10	Ret	Ret	Ret	6	9	6	128
10	(Australia) Cody Donald	8	7	6							7	5	6	2	3	Ret	5	5	9				116
11	(Australia) Cameron Shields	5	3	Ret	2	15	4	8	6	4				4	13	7							108
12	(Australia) Benjamin D'Alia	14	10	11	12	12	11	16	15	12	Ret	10	Ret	11	11	13	16	12	11				69
13	(Australia) Jake Donaldson	10	13	5	9	5	5	13	11	19	Ret	Ret	Ret										57
14	(Australia) Conor Nicholson							19	16	Ret	12	14	10	14	14	15	14	13	16	12	14	11	49
15	(Australia) Harrison Goodman	21	18	17	13	14	Ret	20	17	18	14	17	15	13	17	16	15	14	17	11	10	10	49
16	(Australia) Courtney Prince	4	14	4	8	10	7	5	5	5	DSQ	DSQ	DSQ	DSQ	Wth	Wth	9	8	8	10	8	9	43
17	(New Zealand) Callum Hedge				10	9	10	7	9	14													38
18	(Australia) Cody Burcher							12	13	11	17	12	12				7	7	10	8	7	8	37
19	(Australia) Paul Zsidy	20	17	18	14	13	Ret	22	20	17	16	15	14	Ret	20	18	17	16	18	13	13	12	35
20	(Australia) Adrian Lazzaro	19	Ret	Ret	Ret	11	6	Ret	DNS	16													17
21	(Australia) Jackson Burton	15	19	14				14	14	9	9	9	Ret				13	11	14				14
22	(Australia) Bailey Grech	13	11	12																			12
23	(Australia) Tommy Smith	17	DNS	15										12	15	11	Ret	Wth	Wth				11
24	(Australia) Samuel Dicker													Ret	10	12							10
25	(Australia) Dan Holihan							21	Ret	20										14	12	13	9
26	(Australia) Andy Simpson													Ret	16	14							2
27	(Australia) Christopher Slusarski													15	19	Ret							1
28	(Australia) Harri Jones	18	15	Ret																			1
29	(Australia) Josh Behn	16	16	16																			0
30	(Australia) John Blanchard										Ret	16	11	Ret	18	17							0
31	(Australia) Gavin Dumas													Ret	21	Ret							0
32	(Australia) Matt Roesler													17	22	19							0
33	(Australia) Paul Di Biase													16	23	Ret							0
Guest drivers ineligible for points
	(Australia) James Dean																11	10	12				
	(Australia) Matthew Holmes										13	11	Ret										
	(Australia) Spencer Ackermann										11	DNS	DNS										
	(Australia) Finlay Allen							15	19	13													
	(Australia) Blaine Grills										15	Ret	DNS				12	17	15				
	(Australia) Nicholas Padjen							18	18	Ret													
Pos.	Driver	(Victoria (state)) WIN			(Queensland) QUE			(New South Wales) WAK			(Victoria (state)) SAN			(South Australia) BEN			(Victoria (state)) PHI			(New South Wales) SYD			Pts
Pos.	Driver	R1	R2	R3	R1	R2	R3	R1	R2	R3	R1	R2	R3	R1	R2	R3	R1	R2	R3	R1	R2	R3	Pts

=== Formula Ford 1600 (Kent) standings ===
Pos.	Driver	(Queensland) QUE			(Victoria (state)) SAN			(New South Wales) SYD			Pts
Pos.	Driver	R1	R2	R3	R1	R2	R3	R1	R2	R3	Pts
1	(Australia) Dylan Fahey	3	2	1	2	1	Ret	2	2	2	140
2	(Australia) Robert Rowe	4	4	3	8	6	5	3	4	3	120
3	(Australia) Jason Liddell	5	5	Ret	6	8	4	5	3	4	105
4	(Australia) Tim Hamilton	1	1	2	3	3	Ret	4	Ret	DNS	100
5	(Australia) Josh Buchan							1	1	1	61
6	(Australia) Dave Wood							7	6	5	32
7	(Australia) Jimmy Bailey										30
Guest drivers ineligible for points
	(Australia) Brendan Jones				1	2	1				
	(Australia) John Connelly				4	5	3				
	(Australia) Peter Fitzgerald				5	4	2				
	(Australia) Joshua Glinn							6	5	6	
	(Australia) Philip Marrinon				7	Ret	6				
	(Australia) Byron Thomas				9	7	7				
	(Australia) Harrison Blanchard				10	9	8				
Pos.	Driver	(Queensland) QUE			(Victoria (state)) SAN			(New South Wales) SYD			Pts
Pos.	Driver	R1	R2	R3	R1	R2	R3	R1	R2	R3	Pts
