= 2025 TCR Australia Touring Car Series =

TCR race series

The 2025 TCR Australia Series was the sixth and final season of the TCR Australia Touring Car Series. The series consisted of two rounds, both as part of the TCR World Tour. The championship began on 13 September at The Bend Motorsport Park and concluded at Guia Circuit on 16 November after two rounds.

== Calendar ==
The 2025 calendar was announced on 10 December 2024. However, it was updated on 14 February 2025, with One Raceway added as the second round instead of the originally planned first round at Taupō International Motorsport Park. On 18 February 2025, the venue of final round was confirmed as Guia Circuit, where the series will once again support the TCR World Tour after the penultimate round at The Bend Motorsport Park. On 22 April 2025, the season opener at Wanneroo Raceway was also cancelled, reducing the calendar to four rounds. On 17 June 2025, both the season opener at One Raceway and the second round at Winton Motor Raceway were cancelled, leaving a calendar of two rounds, that were a part of the TCR World Tour. Round 2 was also a non-championship round for the TCR Asia Series. Round 1 formed the Australia Cup for local entries.

Round	Circuit	Location	Date	Supporting
1	(Australia) The Bend Motorsport Park	Tailem Bend, South Australia	12–14 September	Supercars Championship
2	(Macau) Guia Circuit	Macau Peninsula, Macau	13–16 November	FIA FR World Cup; FIA F4 World Cup; FIA GT World Cup; Macau Motorcycle Grand Prix; Macau Roadsport Challenge; TCR World Tour; SRO GT Cup

Cancelled
Circuit	Location	Date
(New Zealand) Taupo International Motorsport Park	Taupō, New Zealand	11–13 April
(Australia) CARCO.com.au Raceway	Wanneroo, Western Australia	6–8 June
(Australia) One Raceway	Goulburn, New South Wales	27–29 June
(Australia) Winton Motor Raceway	Winton, Victoria	22–24 August

== Entry list ==
The following teams and drivers are under contract to compete in the 2025 championship. Kumho is the new official tire supplier. On 17 June 2025, the Kumho Cup was introduced for the 2025 season, in a bid to keep more older-spec cars on the grid.

Team	Car	No.	Drivers	Class	Rounds	Ref.
(Australia) HMO Customer Racing	Hyundai Elantra N TCR (2024)	5	(Australia) Ryan MacMillan		All	
(Australia) HMO Customer Racing	Hyundai Elantra N TCR (2024)	30	(Australia) Josh Buchan		All	
(Australia) HMO Customer Racing	Hyundai i30 N TCR	281	(Hong Kong) Lo Sze Ho	CUP	1	
(Hong Kong) Evolve Racing	Hyundai Elantra N TCR	281	(Hong Kong) Lo Sze Ho		2	
(Australia) Challenge Motorsport	Audi RS 3 LMS TCR (2017)	22	(Australia) Iain McDougall	CUP	1	
(Australia) Ashley Seward Motorsport	Lynk & Co 03 TCR	36	(Australia) Cody Burcher		1	
(China) Z.Speed N MAS	Hyundai Elantra N TCR	69	(Chinese Taipei) Andy Liang		2	
(Australia) Exclusive Switchboards	Honda Civic Type R TCR (FL5)	74	(Australia) Brad Harris		1	
(Italy) BRC Hyundai N Squadra Corse	Hyundai Elantra N TCR (2024)	105	(Hungary) Norbert Michelisz	W	All	
(Italy) BRC Hyundai N Squadra Corse	Hyundai Elantra N TCR (2024)	129	(Argentina) Néstor Girolami	W	All	
(Italy) BRC Hyundai N Squadra Corse	Hyundai Elantra N TCR (2024)	196	(Spain) Mikel Azcona	W	All	
(France) SP Compétition	Cupra León VZ TCR	107	(France) Aurélien Comte	W	All	
(France) SP Compétition	Cupra León VZ TCR	108	(Republic of Ireland) Max Hart	W	2	
(Sweden) Lynk & Co Cyan Racing	Lynk & Co 03 FL TCR	111	(Sweden) Thed Björk	W	All	
(Sweden) Lynk & Co Cyan Racing	Lynk & Co 03 FL TCR	112	(Uruguay) Santiago Urrutia	W	All	
(Sweden) Lynk & Co Cyan Racing	Lynk & Co 03 FL TCR	155	(China) Ma Qing Hua	W	All	
(Sweden) Lynk & Co Cyan Racing	Lynk & Co 03 FL TCR	168	(France) Yann Ehrlacher	W	All	
(Spain) GOAT Racing	Honda Civic Type R TCR (FL5)	123	(Argentina) Ignacio Montenegro	W	All	
(Spain) GOAT Racing	Honda Civic Type R TCR (FL5)	174	(Spain) Pepe Oriola	W	2	
(Spain) GOAT Racing	Honda Civic Type R TCR (FL5)	186	(Argentina) Esteban Guerrieri	W	All	
(Australia) Tufflift Racing	Audi RS 3 LMS TCR (2021)	210	(Australia) Zac Soutar		1	
(Australia) Garry Rogers Motorsport	Peugeot 308 P51 TCR	233	(Australia) Jordan Cox		1	
(China) RevX Racing	Audi RS 3 LMS TCR (2021)	288	(Chinese Taipei) Sean Chang		2	

Icon	Class
W	TCR World Tour entries ineligible to score points
CUP	Kumho Cup

== Results and standings ==
=== Season summary ===
Round	Race	Event	Pole position	Fastest Lap	Winning Driver	Winning Team
1	1	(South Australia) The Bend Motorsport Park		Cancelled due to shipping delays		
1	2	(South Australia) The Bend Motorsport Park	(Spain) Mikel Azcona	(Spain) Mikel Azcona	(Hungary) Norbert Michelisz (Note: Mikel Azcona originally won the race, but later received a five-second time penalty for a false start. Norbert Michelisz, initially classified second, inherited the win.)	(Italy) BRC Hyundai N Squadra Corse
1	3	(South Australia) The Bend Motorsport Park		(Argentina) Néstor Girolami	(Argentina) Néstor Girolami	(Italy) BRC Hyundai N Squadra Corse
2	4	(Macau) Guia Circuit	(Argentina) Néstor Girolami	(Spain) Mikel Azcona	(Argentina) Néstor Girolami	(Italy) BRC Hyundai N Squadra Corse
2	5	(Macau) Guia Circuit		(Republic of Ireland) Max Hart	(Australia) Josh Buchan	(Australia) HMO Customer Racing

=== Championship standings ===
Points system

Position	**1st**	**2nd**	**3rd**	**4th**	**5th**	**6th**	**7th**	**8th**	**9th**	**10th**	**11th**	**12th**	**13th**	**14th**	**15th**	**16th**	**17th**	**18th**	**19th**	**20th**	**DNF**
Qualifying	6	5	4	3	2	1	0														0
Races 1 & 3	50	46	44	42	40	38	36	34	32	30	28	26	25	24	23	22	21	20	19	18	0
Race 2	35	31	29	27	25	23	21	19	17	15	13	11	10	9	8	7	6	5	4	3	0

- The driver who sets the fastest lap in a race receives one additional point.

==== Drivers' championship ====
Pos.	Driver	BEN (South Australia)			GUI (Macau)		Points	AC
1	(Australia) Josh Buchan	C	4^{4}	5	7	**1**	186	93
2	(Australia) Ryan MacMillan	C	15	12	13	9	154	76
3	(Hong Kong) Lo Sze Ho	C	17	15	8	10	143	
4	(Australia) Zac Soutar	C	13	13			74	74
5	(Chinese Taipei) Sean Chang				14	14	72	
6	(Australia) Jordan Cox	C	16	14			65	65
7	(Chinese Taipei) Andy Liang				15	16	65	
8	(Australia) Iain McDougall	C	18	16			57	61
9	(Australia) Cody Burcher	C	9	Ret			35	35
10	(Australia) Brad Harris	C	14	Ret			30	30
TCR World Tour drivers ineligible to score points
—	(Argentina) Néstor Girolami	C	10	1	**1**^{1}	6	—	
—	(Hungary) Norbert Michelisz	C	1^{2}	9	Ret^{4}	8	—	
—	(Spain) Mikel Azcona	C	**2**^{1}	10	2	13	—	
—	(Argentina) Esteban Guerrieri	C	8	2	4^{6}	5	—	
—	(China) Ma Qing Hua	C	6	8	6	2	—	
—	(France) Yann Ehrlacher	C	3^{3}	6	3^{2}	11	—	
—	(Argentina) Ignacio Montenegro	C	7^{6}	3	Ret^{5}	4	—	
—	(Sweden) Thed Björk	C	5^{5}	7	5^{3}	3	—	
—	(France) Aurélien Comte	C	11	4	12	12	—	
—	(Republic of Ireland) Max Hart				9	7	—	
—	(Uruguay) Santiago Urrutia	C	12	11	10	15	—	
—	(Spain) Pepe Oriola				11	Ret	—	
Pos.	Driver	BEN (South Australia)			GUI (Macau)		Points	AC

Key
Colour	Result
Gold	Winner
Silver	Second place
Bronze	Third place
Green	Other points position
Blue	Other classified position
Blue	Not classified, finished (NC)
Purple	Not classified, retired (Ret)
Red	Did not qualify (DNQ)
Red	Did not pre-qualify (DNPQ)
Black	Disqualified (DSQ)
White	Did not start (DNS)
White	Race cancelled (C)
Blank	Did not practice (DNP)
Blank	Excluded (EX)
Blank	Did not arrive (DNA)
Blank	Withdrawn (WD)
Blank	Did not enter (cell empty)
Text formatting	Meaning
**Bold**	Pole position
Italics	Fastest lap

Notes:
^{1 2 3 4 5 6} – Qualifying positions

==== Kumho Cup ====
Pos.	Driver	BEN (South Australia)			GUI (Macau)		Points
1	(Hong Kong) Lo Sze Ho	C	**1**^{1}	1	1	1	178
2	(Australia) Iain McDougall	C	2^{2}	2			82
Pos.	Driver	BEN (South Australia)			GUI (Macau)		Points
