= Tom Sargent (racing driver) =

Australian racing driver (born 2003)

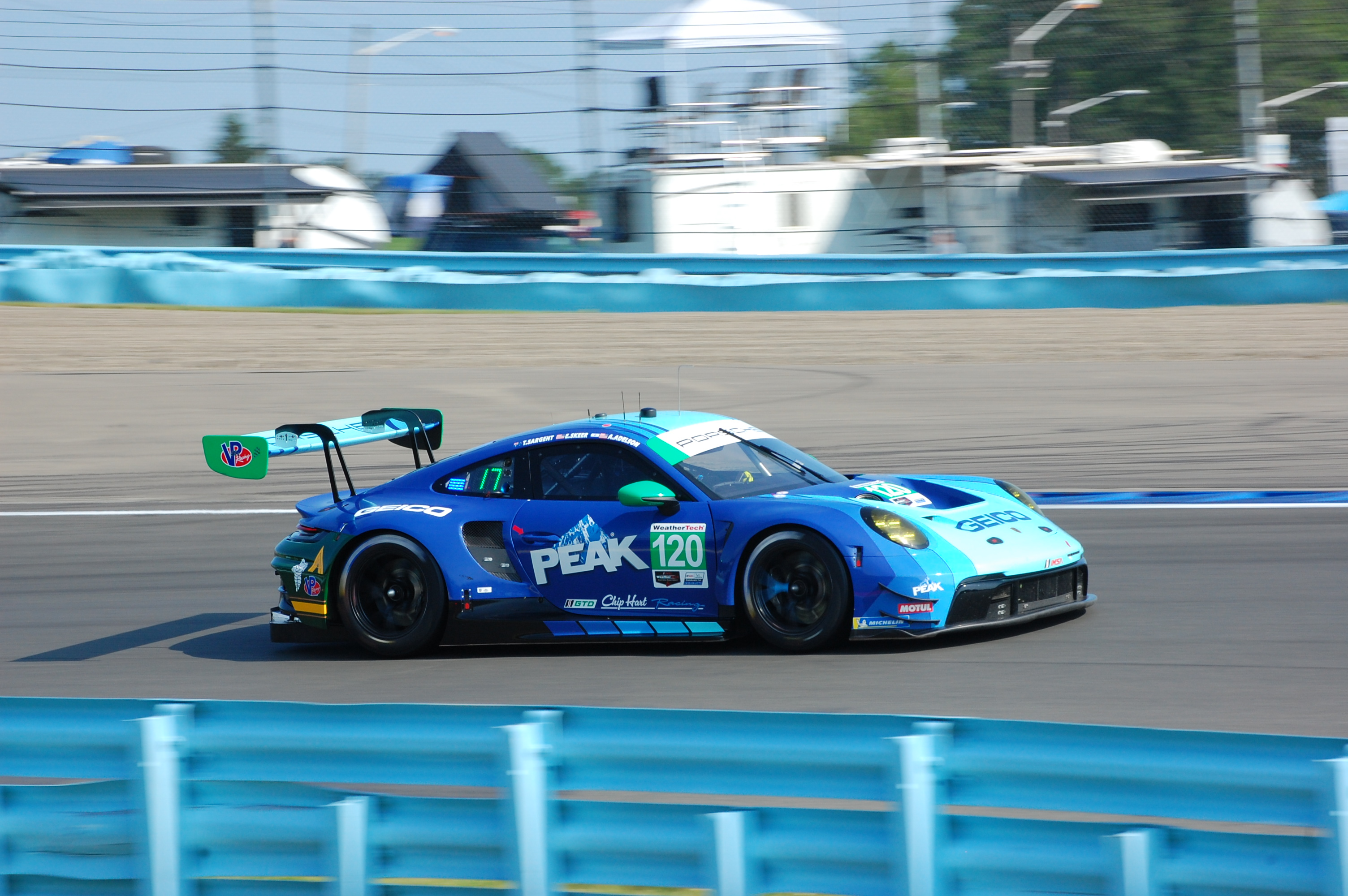
- Sargent in 2025
- Born: Thomas Sargent; 19 July 2003 (age 23); Young, New South Wales, Australia
- Nationality: (Australia) Australian

GT World Challenge America career
- Debut season: 2023
- Current team: GMG Racing
- Categorisation: FIA Silver
- Car number: 32
- Former teams: DXDT Racing
- Starts: 27
- Wins: 1
- Podiums: 5
- Poles: 1
- Fastest laps: 4
- Best finish: 5th in 2024, 2025

Championship titles
- 2022 2021 2021 2020: Porsche Michelin Sprint Challenge; Australian Formula Ford; VIC Formula Ford; NSW Formula Ford
- Statistics up to date as of November 16, 2025.

Thomas Sargent (born 1 November 2001) is an Australian racing driver who competes in the IMSA SportsCar Championship for Wright Motorsports, in GT World Challenge America for GMG Racing, and in the European Le Mans Series for Proton Competition. He is an official selected driver for Porsche Motorsport North America.

== Racing record ==
=== Career summary ===
Season	Series	Team	Races	Wins	Poles	F/Laps	Podiums	Points	Position
2018	Australian Formula Ford Series	CHE Racing Team	15	0	0	1	3	138	8th
2018	Victorian Formula Ford Fiesta Championship		6	0	0	1	0	101	17th
2018	New South Wales Formula Ford Fiesta Championship		15	2	0	1	8	332	**2nd**
2018	CAMS South Australian Formula Ford Championship		4	0	0	0	0	82	12th
2019	Australian Formula Ford Series	CHE Racing Team	18	2	1	2	11	235	**3rd**
2019	Victorian Formula Ford Championship		3	0	0	0	2	55	20th
2019	Formula Ford Fiesta New South Wales	CHE Racing Team	6	1	1	1	4	150	6th
2020	Formula Ford New South Wales	Che Racing	9	5	2	5	7	??	**1st**
2021	Formula Ford Fiesta Victoria	Colin Hill Engineering	8	7	3	7	7	246	**1st**
2021	Formula Ford Australia	Che Racing	11	9	4	4	10	200	**1st**
2022	Porsche Sprint Challenge Australia - Pro	CHE Racing	15	7	0	2	15	852	**1st**
2022	GT World Challenge Australia - Trophy		3	2	0	2	3	??	??
2023	Porsche Carrera Cup North America - Pro	McElrea Racing	16	1	2	2	10	243	**2nd**
2023	Intercontinental GT Challenge	DXDT Racing	1	0	0	0	0	0	NC
2023	GT World Challenge America - Pro-Am	DXDT Racing	1	0	0	0	0	0	NC
2024	GT World Challenge America - Pro-Am	GMG Racing	13	1	0	2	2	112	5th
2024	Intercontinental GT Challenge	GMG Racing	1	0	0	0	0	0	NC
2025	IMSA SportsCar Championship - GTD	Wright Motorsports	5	0	1	0	2	1432	18th
2025	GT World Challenge Europe Endurance Cup	Wright Motorsports	2	0	0	0	0	0	NC
2025	GT World Challenge Europe Endurance Cup - Gold	Wright Motorsports	2	0	0	0	0	33	9th
2025	Intercontinental GT Challenge	Wright Motorsports	1	0	0	0	0	1	32nd
2025	Intercontinental GT Challenge	GMG Racing	1	0	0	0	0	1	32nd
2025	GT World Challenge America - Pro-Am	GMG Racing	13	0	1	2	3	134	5th
2026	IMSA SportsCar Championship - GTD	Wright Motorsports	5	0	0	0	2	1187	31st
2026	GT World Challenge America - Pro-Am	GMG Racing	6	0	0	4	1	0	NC†
2026	Porsche Carrera Cup North America - Pro	GMG Racing	2	2	2	0	2	54	14th
2026	European Le Mans Series - LMGT3	Proton Competition	6	2	0	1	2	86	**2nd**
2026	GT World Challenge Asia	Absolute Corse	2	0	0	0	0	0	NC†
2026-27	Asian Le Mans Series - GT3	Herberth Motorsport							

=== Complete IMSA SportsCar Championship results ===
(key) (Races in bold indicate pole position) (Races in italics indicate fastest lap)

Year	Entrant	Class	Car	Engine	1	2	3	4	5	6	7	8	9	10	Rank	Points
2025	Wright Motorsports	GTD	Porsche 911 GT3 R (992)	Porsche M97/80 4.2 L Flat-6	**DAY**; 2	SEB; 5	LGA	DET	WGL; 13	MOS	ELK	VIR	IMS; 2	PET; 6	18th	1432
2026	Wright Motorsports	GTD	Porsche 911 GT3 R (992.2)	Porsche M97/80 4.2 L Flat-6	DAY; 20	SEB; 3	LBH	LGA	WGL; 2	MOS	ELK; 17	VIR	IMS	PET; 7	31st	1187

* Season still in progress.

=== Complete European Le Mans Series results ===
(key) (Races in bold indicate pole position; results in italics indicate fastest lap)

Year	Entrant	Class	Chassis	Engine	1	2	3	4	5	6	Rank	Points
2026	Proton Competition	LMGT3	Porsche 911 GT3 R (992.2)	Porsche M97/80 4.2 L Flat-6	CAT; 1	LEC; 7	IMO; 4	SPA; 5	SIL; 6	ALG; 1	2nd	86
