= 2017 Australian Formula Ford Series =

Motor racing competition

The 2017 Australian Formula Ford Series was an Australian motor racing series open to Formula Ford and Formula Ford 1600 cars. It was the 48th Australian Formula Ford Series and was sanctioned by the Australian Auto Sport Alliance (AASA).

The series was won by Max Vidau driving a Mygale SJ1019.

== Teams and drivers ==
Team	Chassis	No	Driver	Class	Rounds
Speco/VHT	Spectrum 011	1	(Australia) Brendan Jones	K	1, 6
Sonic Motor Racing Services; TanderSport	Mygale SJ10a	2	(Australia) Max Vidau		1–4, 6
Sonic Motor Racing Services; TanderSport	Mygale SJ10a	74	(Australia) Max Vidau		5
Sonic Motor Racing Services; TanderSport	Mygale SJ11a	3	(Australia) Courtney Prince		1–3, 6
Sonic Motor Racing Services; TanderSport	Mygale SJ11a	32	(Australia) Courtney Prince		5
Sonic Motor Racing Services; TanderSport	Mygale SJ10a	4	(New Zealand) Hunter McElrea		1, 3–4, 6
Sonic Motor Racing Services; TanderSport	Mygale SJ10a	14	(New Zealand) Hunter McElrea		2
Sonic Motor Racing Services; TanderSport	Mygale SJ10a	44	(New Zealand) Hunter McElrea		5
Sonic Motor Racing Services; TanderSport	Mygale SJ15a	5	(Australia) Hamish Ribarits		1, 3, 5–6
Sonic Motor Racing Services; TanderSport	Mygale SJ12	28	(Australia) James Westaway		6
Sonic Motor Racing Services; TanderSport	Mygale SJ12	58	(Australia) Angelo Mouzouris		1, 3–4
Anglo Motorsport	Spirit WL11	3	(Australia) Kane Coleman	K	5
Anglo Motorsport	Spirit WL11	15	(Australia) Kane Coleman	K	3
Anglo Motorsport	Spirit K08	4	(Australia) Keith Brenan	K	2
Anglo Motorsport	Spirit K08	41	(Australia) Keith Brenan	K	5
Anglo Motorsport	Spectrum 010	32	(Australia) Simon Hodges	K	3
Anglo Motorsport	Mygale SJ08	41	(Australia) Dan Holihan	K	1–3
Anglo Motorsport	Van Diemen RF91	91	(Australia) Josh Behn	K	2
Anglo Motorsport	Mygale SJ08	91	(Australia) Josh Behn	K	5
3 Amigos Racing	Mondiale	4	(Australia) Robert Rowe	K	5
Zdisy Racing	Spectrum 012	6	(Australia) Paul Zsidy		All
Zdisy Racing	Spectrum 014b	60	(Australia) Cody Donald		6
Zdisy Racing	Spectrum 014	97	(Australia) Liam McLellan		6
James Corbett	Spirit K08	7	(Australia) James Corbett	K	3
The Torque Team	Mygale SJ07a	7	(Australia) Paul Milevskiy	K	4
Penrite Oil/Modem Construction	Mygale SJ11a	8	(Australia) Jordan Boys		1–2
DYFA Plumbing	Van Diemen	8	(Australia) Dylan Fahey	K	4
Don Holland Racing	Swift DB-1	8	(Australia) David Holland	K	5
Aaron Cameron Racing	Spectrum 014	9	(Australia) Aaron Cameron		1, 3
Josh Jackson Racing	Spectrum 07	9	(Australia) Josh Jackson	K	2
Team Soutar Motorsport	Mygale SJ13	10	(Australia) Zac Soutar		All
Listec Race Cars	Listec WIL-013	11	(Australia) James Burge		2, 5
Listec Race Cars	Listec WIL-013	42	(United States) Ryan Bjerke		1
Listec Race Cars	Van Diemen	53	(Australia) Mark Lowing		5
Listec Race Cars	Listec WIL-05K	61	(Australia) Alan Price		5
Colin Hill Engineering	Mygale	14	(Australia) Lachlan Mineeff		5
Dream Motorsport	Mygale SJ13a	16	(Australia) Cooper Murray		All
Lachlan Gibbons Motorsport	Mygale SJ07	18	(Australia) Lachlan Gibbons		2, 5
Ultra Tune Hawthorn	Mygale	19	(Australia) Spencer Ackermann		1, 6
Jones Motorsport	Spectrum 014d	21	(Australia) Harri Jones		All
	Spectrum 06b	22	(Australia) Douglas Williams	K	1
Snap On Tools	Van Diemen RF91	25	(Australia) Karla Curtis	K	4
Shell	Mygale SJ09	29	(Australia) Nathan Herne		All
Borland Racing Developments	Spectrum 015	31	(Australia) Jayden Ojeda		All
Borland Racing Developments	Spectrum 015	48	(Australia) Nicholas Carroll		1–3
Borland Racing Developments	Mygale SJ13a	60	(Australia) Cody Donald		1–3
Borland Racing Developments	Spectrum 012b	85	(Australia) Benjamin Reichstein		1–4
Borland Racing Developments	Spectrum 014	97	(Australia) Liam McLellan		1–5
	Van Diemen RF86	33	(Australia) Frank Harris	K	6
Jake Donaldson Racing	Spectrum 011d	35	(Australia) Jake Donaldson		5
Gary Goulding	Vector TF94	36	(Australia) Gary Goulding	K	4
	Van Diemen RF91	36	(Australia) Mark Zellner	K	6
Ellery Motorsport	Spectrum 010	37	(Australia) Alec Limmer	K	3–4, 6
TanderSport	Stealth	42	(Australia) Leanne Tander	K	6
Synergy Motorsport	Spectrum 014	44	(Australia) Jett Bennett		1–4, 6
Synergy Motorsport	Spectrum 012	57	(Australia) Jackson Burton		2–3, 5
Nicholas Schembri	Mygale SJ09	45	(Australia) Nicholas Schembri		3
	Van Diemen RF01	47	(Australia) Adrian Wilkinson	K	6
	Spectrum 011b	50	(Australia) Mark Samson	K	6
	Swift SC95K	52	(Australia) Malcolm Coleman	K	1
	Spectrum 012	66	(Australia) Benjamin D'Alia		1, 3
Fastlane Racing	Stealth S3D	72	(Australia) Bart Horsten		5–6
BF Racing	Mygale SJ11a	73	(Australia) Cameron Shields		All
	Mygale SJ03	76	(Australia) Robert Suturkovski	K	1, 6
	Mygale SJ01a	77	(Australia) James Garley	K	1
	Mygale SJ11	78	(Australia) Andrew Petrou		1
Sam Sewell	Van Diemen	80	(Australia) Sam Sewell	K	4
Donate Life	Swift 93F	80	(Australia) Jason Liddell	K	5
Reichstein Motorsport	Spectrum 012b	85	(Australia) Benjamin Reichstein		5–6
Cadohaven Drainage & Excavation	Van Diemen RF91	86	(Australia) Shane Baumer	K	2
Tim Hamilton	Spectrum 010b	87	(Australia) Tim Hamilton	K	3–5
Autoware	Van Diemen RF01	92	(Australia) Mitchell Maddren	K	2–4
Lazzaro Motorsport	Spectrum 011	95	(Australia) Adrian Lazzaro		1, 3, 5–6
Bailey Boys Racing	Spectrum 06b	96	(Australia) Jimmy Bailey	K	4
Granite Consulting	Spectrum 011b	98	(Australia) Conor Nicholson		1, 3, 6
PLG Gearcutting	Citation	99	(Australia) John Connelly	K	6
Manager Software	Van Diemen RF92	511	(Australia) Tony Chapman	K	2

== Race calendar ==
The series was contested over six rounds with three races at each round.

Round	Circuit	Dates	Map
1	(Victoria (state)) Sandown Raceway (Melbourne, Victoria)	4–5 March	2017 Australian Formula Ford Series is located in Australia
2	Wakefield Park Raceway (Goulburn, New South Wales)	1–2 April	2017 Australian Formula Ford Series is located in Australia
3	(Victoria (state)) Winton Motor Raceway (Winton, Victoria)	19–21 May	2017 Australian Formula Ford Series is located in Australia
4	Queensland Raceway (Willowbank, Queensland)	8–9 July	2017 Australian Formula Ford Series is located in Australia
5	Sydney Motorsport Park (Eastern Creek, New South Wales)	16–17 September	2017 Australian Formula Ford Series is located in Australia
6	(Victoria (state)) Phillip Island Grand Prix Circuit (Phillip Island, Victoria)	30 September–1 October	2017 Australian Formula Ford Series is located in Australia

Designates Formula Ford 1600 (Kent) class rounds

== Results and standings ==
=== Results ===
Rd	Race	Circuit	Pole position	Fastest lap	Winning driver	Winning team
1	1	(Victoria (state)) Sandown Raceway	(Australia) Liam McLellan	(Australia) Jayden Ojeda	(Australia) Jayden Ojeda	Borland Racing Developments
1	2	(Victoria (state)) Sandown Raceway		(Australia) Jordan Boys	(Australia) Jayden Ojeda	Borland Racing Developments
1	3	(Victoria (state)) Sandown Raceway		(Australia) Jayden Ojeda	(Australia) Max Vidau	Sonic Motor Racing Services
2	1	(New South Wales) Wakefield Park Raceway	(New Zealand) Hunter McElrea	(Australia) Liam McLellan	(Australia) Max Vidau	Sonic Motor Racing Services
2	2	(New South Wales) Wakefield Park Raceway		(Australia) Max Vidau	(Australia) Max Vidau	Sonic Motor Racing Services
2	3	(New South Wales) Wakefield Park Raceway		(Australia) Max Vidau	(New Zealand) Hunter McElrea	Sonic Motor Racing Services
3	1	(Victoria (state)) Winton Motor Raceway	(Australia) Aaron Cameron	Race cancelled due to opening lap crash		
3	2	(Victoria (state)) Winton Motor Raceway		(Australia) Max Vidau	(Australia) Aaron Cameron	Aaron Cameron Racing
3	3	(Victoria (state)) Winton Motor Raceway		(New Zealand) Hunter McElrea	(Australia) Max Vidau	Sonic Motor Racing Services
4	1	Queensland Raceway	(Australia) Max Vidau	(Australia) Max Vidau	(Australia) Cameron Shields	BF Racing
4	2	Queensland Raceway		(Australia) Cameron Shields	(New Zealand) Hunter McElrea	Sonic Motor Racing Services
4	3	Queensland Raceway		(Australia) Max Vidau	(Australia) Cameron Shields	BF Racing
5	1	(New South Wales) Sydney Motorsport Park	(New Zealand) Hunter McElrea	(Australia) Cameron Shields	(Australia) Cameron Shields	BF Racing
5	2	(New South Wales) Sydney Motorsport Park		(Australia) Jayden Ojeda	(Australia) Cameron Shields	BF Racing
5	3	(New South Wales) Sydney Motorsport Park		(Australia) Dave Wood	(Australia) Cameron Shields	BF Racing
6	1	(Victoria (state)) Phillip Island Grand Prix Circuit	(Australia) Max Vidau	(New Zealand) Hunter McElrea	(Australia) Cameron Shields	BF Racing
6	2	(Victoria (state)) Phillip Island Grand Prix Circuit		(New Zealand) Hunter McElrea	(Australia) Cameron Shields	BF Racing
6	3	(Victoria (state)) Phillip Island Grand Prix Circuit		(Australia) James Westaway	(Australia) Cameron Shields	BF Racing

=== Standings ===
Pos.	Driver	(Victoria (state)) SAN			(New South Wales) WAK			(Victoria (state)) WIN			(Queensland) QLD			(New South Wales) SMP			(Victoria (state)) PHI			Pts.
Pos.	Driver	R1	R2	R3	R1	R2	R3	R1	R2	R3	R1	R2	R3	R1	R2	R3	R1	R2	R3	Pts.
1	(Australia) Max Vidau	2	2	1	1	1	4	C	2	1	3	3	2	3	5	3	3	19	3	245
2	(Australia) Cameron Shields	3	3	Ret	2	DSQ	Ret	C	7	7	1	2	1	1	1	1	1	1	1	231
3	(Australia) Jayden Ojeda	1	1	3	3	3	12	C	4	3	4	6	Ret	5	3	6	2	9	4	195
4	(New Zealand) Hunter McElrea	5	4	19	19	10	1	C	3	4	2	1	3	2	2	2	13	15	2	189
5	(Australia) Liam McLellan	DSQ	13	2	4	2	2	C	15	Ret	8	8	7	8	9	7	7	6	6	137
6	(Australia) Nathan Herne	7	8	6	13	9	6	C	16	Ret	6	7	6	4	7	5	10	3	9	132.5
7	(Australia) Cooper Murray	4	Ret	10	5	5	3	C	5	6	5	5	5	Ret	6	Ret	16	14	8	130
8	(Australia) Harri Jones	Ret	15	5	8	DSQ	Ret	C	8	Ret	7	4	4	6	4	4	4	4	7	128
9	(Australia) Zac Soutar	11	14	8	12	10	Ret	C	10	11	14	11	8	12	16	12	12	7	DSQ	78.5
10	(Australia) Adrian Lazzaro	Ret	9	Ret				C	6	4				7	10	8	8	8	5	77
11	(Australia) Benjamin Reichstein	16	11	7	14	8	8	C	11	25	Ret	18	17	13	14	10	9	5	14	76
12	(Australia) Courtney Prince	18	19	14	11	12	7	C	14	12				9	12	9	5	2	17	73
13	(Australia) Jett Bennett	21	18	9	7	6	Ret	C	17	10	10	10	9				15	16	13	57
14	(Australia) Jordan Boys	8	5	4	9	4	5													55.5
15	(Australia) Aaron Cameron	9	6	16				C	1	2										50
16	(Australia) Paul Zsidy	13	21	13	16	16	9				11	12	11	15	19	16	20	10	19	41
17	(Australia) Nicholas Carroll	15	12	11	6	14	Ret													33.5
18	(Australia) Cody Donald	6	10	Ret	DSQ	11	Ret										18	18	12	30.5
19	(Australia) Hamish Ribarits	10	7	Ret										16	8	24	21	17	10	26
20	(Australia) Angelo Mouzouris	Ret	24	12							9	9	10							23
21	(Australia) Lachlan Gibbons				10	15	Ret							Ret	11	11				17
22	(Australia) Alec Limmer										16	15	15				19	12	Ret	14
23	(Australia) Bart Horsten													Ret	15	15	11	13	16	14
24	(Australia) Jackson Burton				15	13	10							14	Ret	DNS				13
25	(Australia) Conor Nicholson	19	23	17													17	11	18	8
26	(Australia) Jake Donaldson													10	17	Ret				6
27	(Australia) Lachlan Mineeff													Ret	13	13				6
28	(United States) Ryan Bjerke	12	16	18																5.5
29	(Australia) Benjamin D'Alia	17	22	15																4
30	(Australia) Spencer Ackermann	14	17	Ret													14	DSQ	15	0
31	(Australia) James Burge				17	Ret	Ret							11	18	14				0
32	(Australia) Andrew Petrou	20	20	DNS																0
33	(Australia) Nicholas Schembri																			0
34	(Australia) Jamie Westaway																6	DSQ	11	0
Pos.	Driver	R1	R2	R3	R1	R2	R3	R1	R2	R3	R1	R2	R3	R1	R2	R3	R1	R2	R3	Pts.
Pos.	Driver	(Victoria (state)) SAN			(New South Wales) WAK			(Victoria (state)) WIN			(Queensland) QLD			(New South Wales) SMP			(Victoria (state)) PHI			Pts.

==== Formula Ford 1600 (Kent) standings ====
Pos.	Driver	(Victoria (state)) WIN			(Queensland) QLD			(New South Wales) SMP			Pts.
Pos.	Driver	R1	R2	R3	R1	R2	R3	R1	R2	R3	Pts.
1	(Australia) Mitchell Maddren	C	24	18	13	13	Ret	18	21	19	74
2	(Australia) Tim Hamilton	C	26	20	17	16	13	21	24	22	72
3	(Australia) Sam Sewell				12	14	12				56
4	(Australia) Dylan Fahey				15	17	14				40
5	(Australia) Karla Curtis				18	19	16				34
6	(Australia) Kane Coleman	C	23	24				19	22	20	30
7	(Australia) Gary Goulding				20	21	18				29
8	(Australia) Paul Milevskiy				21	22	19				26
9	(Australia) James Corbett	C	29	21							24
10	(Australia) Simon Hodges	C	27	23							23
=	(Australia) Dan Holihan	C	28	22							23
12	(Australia) Jimmy Bailey				19	20	DNS				20
13	(Australia) Alec Limmer	C									18
drivers ineligible for series points
-	(Australia) Keith Brennan							17	20	17	0
-	(Australia) Josh Behn							20	Ret	23	0
-	(Australia) Mark Lowing							22	23	18	0
-	(Australia) Alan Price							23	25	21	0
-	(Australia) Jason Liddell							24	26	25	0
-	(Australia) Robert Rowe							25	28	Ret	0
-	(Australia) David Holland							Ret	27	26	0
Pos.	Driver	R1	R2	R3	R1	R2	R3	R1	R2	R3	Pts.
Pos.	Driver	(Victoria (state)) WIN			(Queensland) QLD			(New South Wales) SMP			Pts.

== Notes ==
- Liam McLellan finished Race 1 at Sandown in second however he was excluded due to a technical infringement.
