= 2020 TCR Australia Series =

Touring car racing series

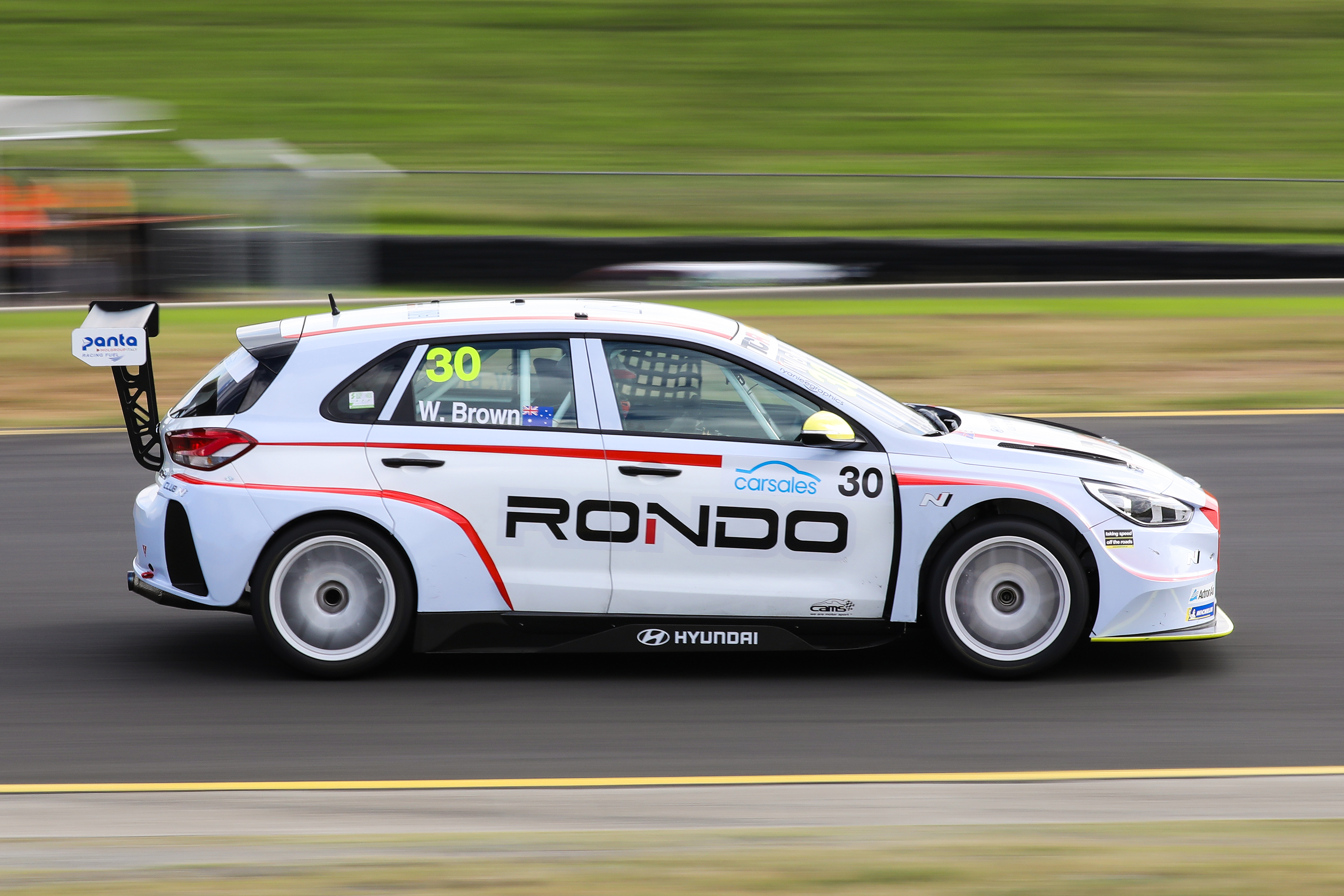
Will Brown was the defending TCR Australia series winner.

The 2020 TCR Australia Series (known for sponsorship reasons as the 2020 carsales TCR Australia Series) was to be an Australian motor racing competition for TCR cars. It was planned to be the second TCR Australia Series and was to be run as part of the renamed Motorsport Australia Championships. The Series was sanctioned by Motorsport Australia as a National Series with the Australian Racing Group appointed as the Category Manager.

The series was cancelled due to the COVID-19 pandemic.

== Teams and drivers ==
The following teams and drivers were under contract to compete in the 2020 series:

Team	Car	No.	Drivers	Class	Rounds	Ref.
(Australia) HMO Customer Racing	Hyundai i30 N TCR	1	(Australia) Will Brown	TBA	TBA	
(Australia) HMO Customer Racing	Hyundai i30 N TCR	11	(Australia) Nathan Morcom	TBA	TBA	
(Australia) Melbourne Performance Centre	Volkswagen Golf GTI TCR	2	(Australia) Chelsea Angelo	TBA	TBA	
(Australia) Melbourne Performance Centre	Audi RS 3 LMS TCR	35	(Australia) Alexandra Whitley	TBA	TBA	
(Australia) Melbourne Performance Centre	Audi RS 3 LMS TCR	75	(Australia) Garth Tander	TBA	TBA	
(Australia) Melbourne Performance Centre	Audi RS 3 LMS TCR	97	(Australia) Liam McAdam	TBA	TBA	
(Australia) Melbourne Performance Centre	Audi RS 3 LMS TCR	100	(Australia) Hamish Ribarits	TBA	TBA	
(Australia) Garry Rogers Motorsport	Alfa Romeo Giulietta Veloce TCR	7	(Australia) Michael Caruso	TBA	TBA	
(Australia) Garry Rogers Motorsport	Alfa Romeo Giulietta Veloce TCR	74	(Australia) Jordan Cox	TBA	TBA	
(Australia) Garry Rogers Motorsport	Peugeot 308 TCR	17	(Australia) Jason Bargwanna	TBA	TBA	
(Australia) Garry Rogers Motorsport	Peugeot 308 TCR	18	(Australia) Aaron Cameron	TBA	TBA	
(Australia) Garry Rogers Motorsport	Peugeot 308 TCR	71	(Australia) Ben Bargwanna	TBA	TBA	
(Australia) Garry Rogers Motorsport	Renault Mégane R.S TCR	33	(Australia) Dylan O'Keeffe	TBA	TBA	
(Australia) Garry Rogers Motorsport	Renault Mégane R.S TCR	34	(Australia) James Moffat	TBA	TBA	
(Australia) Ashley Seward Motorsport	Alfa Romeo Giulietta Veloce TCR	9	(Australia) Jay Hanson	M	TBA	
(Australia) Ashley Seward Motorsport	Alfa Romeo Giulietta Veloce TCR	10	(Australia) James Allen	TBA	TBA	
(Australia) Ashley Seward Motorsport	Alfa Romeo Giulietta Veloce TCR	65	(Australia) David Brabham	TBA	TBA	
(Australia) Michael Clemente Motorsport	Honda Civic Type R TCR (FK8)	15	(Australia) Michael Clemente	M	TBA	
(New Zealand) Track Tec Racing	Audi RS 3 LMS TCR	22	(New Zealand) Jack Milligan	M	TBA	
(Australia) Wall Racing	Honda Civic Type R TCR (FK8)	24	(Australia) John Martin	TBA	TBA	
(Australia) Wall Racing	Honda Civic Type R TCR (FK8)	50	(Australia) Tony D'Alberto	TBA	TBA	
(Australia) Wall Racing	Honda Civic Type R TCR (FK8)	51	(Japan) Takuya Shirasaka	TBA	TBA	
(Australia) Tilton Racing	Hyundai i30 N TCR	26	(Australia) Bradley Shiels	TBA	TBA	
(Australia) Team Soutar Motorsport	Honda Civic Type R TCR (FK8)	110	(Australia) Zac Soutar	M	TBA	
(Australia) DashSport	Hyundai i30 N TCR	111	(Australia) Michael King	M P	TBA	

Key
Icon	Class
M	Michelin Rookie of the Year
P	Panta Cup

=== Summary ===
- Ashley Seward Motorsport will expand to enter three cars. The team had entered a single car throughout the 2019 series before entering a second car at the final event. Australian Formula Ford driver Jay Hanson will make his début in the series with the team.
- Reigning Hyundai Excel Cup—a series run as part of the Shannons Nationals competition—champion Michael Clemente will make his series début after purchasing a Honda Civic Type R used by Wall Racing in 2019. Clemente's team will compete under the name Michael Clemente Motorsport.
- Garry Rogers Motorsport will expand from a three-car entry to a six-car entry. The team will add one Renault Mégane R.S at selected events to their two full season entries from 2019, one of which will be driven by James Moffat; and a second Alfa Romeo Giulietta Veloce alongside the single entry from the previous season, with Michael Caruso and Jordan Cox driving them. The team will also run two Peugeot 308 cars under the GRM Customer Racing banner for New Zealand Touring Cars champion and former Supercars driver Jason Bargwanna, who will make his series début, and Aaron Cameron, coming from Melbourne Performance Center. A third Peugeot will be entered by the team at the TCR Asia Pacific Cup for 2019 TCR BeNeLux Touring Car champion Julien Briché.
- Australian Formula Ford driver Zac Soutar will make his series début with the family-run Team Soutar Motorsport. The team will enter the Honda Civic Type R used by Tony D'Alberto in 2019.
- Production Touring Car driver Michael King will make his series début in a new Hyundai i30 N run by DashSport.
- Kelly Racing, who ran Subaru WRX STI and Holden Astra cars during the 2019 season, withdrew from the championship to focus on their Supercars team following their switch to Ford cars.
- Toyota 86 Champion Jack Milligan and Stan van Oord will make their series début with Track Tec Racing. They will drive a pair of Audi RS 3 LMS.
- Wall Racing will enter three Honda Civic Type R cars retaining John Martin and Tony D'Alberto with Paul Ip joining the team. In addition to the three full season entries, the team will enter a fourth Civic for Münnich Motorsport founder and 2019 TCR Middle East Series champion René Münnich at the TCR Asia Pacific Cup.
- Chelsea Angelo will drive for Melbourne Performance Centre driving a Volkswagen Golf GTI.
- Declan Fraser will make their series début with Milldun Motorsport driving a Volkswagen Golf GTI.
- Bradley Shiels will make his series début in a Hyundai i30 N run by Tilton Racing.

== Race calendar ==
The calendar was announced in October 2019 with seven confirmed rounds, plus two non-championship rounds. The final calendar was published in January 2020. A revised calendar, expanding into 2021 was released on 26 May 2020.

Round	Circuit	Location	Date
1	(New South Wales) Sydney Motorsport Park	Eastern Creek, New South Wales	15–16 August
2	(Victoria (state)) Sandown Raceway	Melbourne, Victoria	12–13 September
3	(Victoria (state)) Phillip Island Grand Prix Circuit	Phillip Island, Victoria	TBA October
4	(New South Wales) Mount Panorama Circuit	Bathurst, New South Wales	12–15 November
5	(Tasmania) Symmons Plains Raceway	Launceston, Tasmania	24–26 January
6	(Tasmania) Baskerville Raceway	Hobart, Tasmania	30–31 January
Cancelled due to the 2019-20 coronavirus pandemic
Circuit		Location	Original Date
(Victoria (state)) Winton Motor Raceway		Benalla, Victoria	1–3 May
(South Australia) The Bend Motorsport Park		Tailem Bend, South Australia	12–14 June
(Queensland) Morgan Park Raceway		Warwick, Queensland	3–5 July
(New South Wales) Mount Panorama Circuit		Bathurst, New South Wales	13–15 November (Note: Originally a non-championship round.)
Partially cancelled due to the 2019-20 coronavirus pandemic
Circuit		Location	Original Date
(Victoria (state)) Albert Park Circuit		Melbourne, Victoria	13–15 March (Note: Originally part of the TCR Asia Pacific Cup. Only one of three races completed.)

=== Calendar changes ===
- The series will visit the Mount Panorama Circuit for the first time, originally having been planned to occur as part of the Bathurst 6 Hour weekend over Easter. Due to the cancellation of the Easter event, the round was rescheduled to the date originally planned to hold the non-championship Bathurst International event.
- The Bend Motorsport Park was originally scheduled to only host one event rather than two as in 2019, while Queensland Raceway was also not listed on the initially released calendar. Neither circuit appeared on the revised calendar.
- Morgan Park Raceway was intended to host a round of the series, marking its first competitive event since 2011. However, it also did not appear on the revised calendar.
- In addition to the seven series rounds originally scheduled, there were originally also planned to be two associated events; a round supporting the Australian Grand Prix weekend was intended to be held as the TCR Asia Pacific Cup, along with an endurance race at Mount Panorama late in the year. Both of these rounds were to be non-championship events. The TCR Asia-Pacific Cup event was cancelled after qualifying was held, due to its status as a support event to the Australian Grand Prix, which was cancelled on the Friday morning. The Bathurst International endurance race was also cancelled, as it had been intended to draw international entries alongside the local teams; the event slot is to be used instead to host the rescheduled series round, along with a rescheduled Bathurst 6 Hour.
- The impacts of the COVID-19 pandemic forced a major reschedule before the first series round took place. All events barring the Sandown round were rescheduled, with an intended March start being pushed to August, and the extension of the season into the 2021 calendar year. Apart from the above-mentioned circuits which were not on the rescheduled calendar, Winton Motor Raceway was also removed from the schedule, while two Tasmanian circuits, Symmons Plains Raceway and Baskerville Raceway were added.

The series was ultimately cancelled due to the COVID-19 pandemic.

== Rule changes ==
- The 2020 series winner will drive in either the World Touring Car Cup or an International TCR race as a wildcard entry as a prize.
- The winner of the Michelin Rookie of the Year will be awarded a test day with a European TCR team.
- Another new class will also be introduced—the Panta Cup, named after the series' fuel supplier, Panta Fuels—in which six semi-professional and amateur drivers will be eligible for. The winner of the Panta Cup will get a drive in an International TCR Endurance race.
