= Angelo Mouzouris =

Australian racing driver

- Nationality: Australian
- Born: 10 August 2001 (age 25) Melbourne, Victoria

Super2 Series career
- Debut season: 2020
- Current team: MW Motorsport
- Car number: 6
- Former teams: Triple Eight Race Engineering
- Starts: 14
- Wins: 0
- Podiums: 1
- Poles: 1
- Best finish: 9th (463 pts) in 2020

Angelo Mouzouris (born 10 August 2001) is an Australian racing driver from Melbourne, Australia currently competing in the Dunlop Super2 Series with MW Motorsport, driving the No. 6 Nissan Altima L33.

== Biography ==
Mouzouris started karting in 2015 and two years later began his racing career in Formula Ford. In 2017, he joined Sonic Motor Racing Services and competed in National and State Formula Ford Championships. After winning the Australian Formula Ford Championship in 2019, he moved to Super2 for 2020 with Triple Eight Race Engineering.

== Racing record ==
=== Karting career summary ===
Season	Series	Position
2015	Australian Kart Championships - KA Junior	3rd
2016	SKUSA SuperNationals XX - X30 Junior	38th
2016	Australian Kart Championships - KA2	9th

=== Career summary ===
Season	Series	Team	Races	Wins	Poles	F/laps	Podiums	Points	Position
2017	Victorian Formula Ford Fiesta Championship	Sonic Motor Racing Services	12	0	0	0	3	207	20th
2017	Australian Formula Ford Series	Sonic Motor Racing Services	8	0	0	0	0	23	20th
2018	Australian Formula Ford Series	Sonic Motor Racing Services	21	0	0	1	2	159	6th
2018	New South Wales Formula Ford Fiesta Championship	Sonic Motor Racing Services	6	0	0	0	0	88	14th
2018	CAMS South Australian Formula Ford Championship	Sonic Motor Racing Services	4	0	0	0	1	89	10th
2018	Victorian Formula Ford Fiesta Championship	Sonic Motor Racing Services	6	0	0	1	1	116	15th
2019	Australian Formula Ford Series	Sonic Motor Racing Services	21	7	1	8	12	295	1st
2019	Victorian Formula Ford Championship	Sonic Motor Racing Services	6	1	0	0	2	116	12th
2019	Formula Ford Fiesta New South Wales	Sonic Motor Racing Services	6	2	0	4	3	150	5th
2020	Super2 Series	Triple Eight Race Engineering	7	0	0	0	0	463	9th
2021	Super2 Series	Triple Eight Race Engineering	7	0	1	0	1	573	11th
2022	Super2 Series	MW Motorsport	10	0	0	0	0	459	16th
2022	Porsche Carrera Cup Australia - Pro	Sonic Motor Racing Services	24	0	0	0	0	298	15th
2023	Porsche Carrera Cup Australia - Pro	Sonic Motor Racing Services	20	0	0	0	0	410	11th
2024	Porsche Carrera Cup Australia - Pro	Sonic Motor Racing Services	24	0	0	0	1	548	9th
2025	Porsche Carrera Cup Australia - Pro	Sonic Motor Racing Services	23	0	0	1	3	662	5th
2026	Porsche Carrera Cup Australia	Sonic Motor Racing Services	3	0	0	0	0	84*	7th*

* Season still in progress

=== Complete Super2 Series results ===
Year	Team	Car	1	2	3	4	5	6	7	8	9	10	11	12	Position	Points
2020	Triple Eight Race Engineering	Holden VF Commodore	ADE; 12	ADE; 10	ADE; 9	SYD; 6	SYD; 5	BAT; 7	BAT; DNS						9th	463
2021	Triple Eight Race Engineering	Holden VF Commodore	BAT; 2	BAT; 4	TOW; 13	TOW; Ret	TOW2; 14	TOW2; 4	SMP; 6	SMP; C	BAT; DNS	BAT; DNS			11th	573
2022	MW Motorsport	Nissan Altima L33	SMP; 13	SMP; Ret	WAN; 5	WAN; 8	TOW; Ret	TOW; 7	SAN; 5	SAN; Ret	BAT; Ret	BAT; C	ADE; Ret	ADE; DNS	16th	549

=== Complete Porsche Carerra Cup Australia results ===
Year	Team	Car	1	2	3	4	5	6	7	8	9	10	11	12	13	14	15	16	17	18	19	20	21	22	23	24	25	26	Position	Points
2022	Sonic Motor Racing Services	Porsche 992 GT3 Cup	ALB; R1	ALB; R2	ALB; R3	ALB; R4	WIN; R5	WIN; R6	WIN; R7	HID; R8	HID; R9	HID; R10	TOW; R11	TOW; R12	TOW; R13	BEN; R14	BEN; R15	BEN; R16	SAN; R17	SAN; R18	SAN; R19	BAT; R20	BAT; R21; C	BAT; R22; C	SUR; R23	SUR; R24	SUR; R25		15th	
2023	Sonic Motor Racing Services	Porsche 992 GT3 Cup	ALB; R1	ALB; R2	ALB; R3	HID; R4	HID; R5	HID; R6	TOW; R7	TOW; R8	TOW; R9	BEN; R10	BEN; R11	BEN; R12	SAN; R13	SAN; R14	SAN; R15	BAT; R16	BAT; R17	BAT; R18	SUR; R19	SUR; R20	SUR; R21	ADE; R22	ADE; R23	ADE; R24			11th	
2024	Sonic Motor Racing Services	Porsche 992 GT3 Cup	ALB; R1; 1	ALB; R2; 1	ALB; R3; 3	TAU; R4; 3	TAU; R5; 13	TAU; R6; 11	HID; R7; 1	HID; R8; 1	HID; R9; 1	SMP; R10; 1	SMP; R11; 1	SMP; R12; 1	SAN; R13; 1	SAN; R14; 2	SAN; R15; 1	BAT; R16; 1	BAT; R17; 1	BAT; R18; 3	SUR; R19; 7	SUR; R20; 3	SUR; R21; 3	ADE; R22; 14	ADE; R23; 4	ADE; R24; 7			9th	
2025	Sonic Motor Racing Services	Porsche 992 GT3 Cup	SMP; R1; 1	SMP; R2; 1	SMP; R3; 1	ALB; R4; 1	ALB; R5; 7	ALB; R6; 6	HID; R7; 2	HID; R8; 3	HID; R9; 2	QLD; R10; 1	QLD; R11; 1	QLD; R12; 1	BEN; R13; 1	BEN; R14; 1	BEN; R15; 2	BAT; R16; 11	BAT; R17; 10	BAT; R18; Ret	SUR; R19; C	SUR; R20; 7	SUR; R21; 6	ADE; R22	ADE; R23	ADE; R24			5th	
