= TCR World Ranking =

TCR Touring Car drivers rankings

The TCR World Ranking is a method for calculating race drivers' performance in TCR races. The ranking was established by World Sporting Consulting (WSC) Group, the global rights holder for TCR, in October 2022 and takes into account all races utilizing TCR regulations since 1 January 2021. The rankings are updated every Wednesday.

== Ranking method ==
=== Race points ===
Ranking points obtained by a driver from a race would be calculated as follows:

$$R = \frac{A \times B \times P}{100}$$

where:

- $R$ - Points obtained by player from the Race
- $A$ - Importance coefficient
- $B$ - Participation coefficient
- $P$ - Points from the finishing position

=== Importance coefficient ===
The importance coefficient is determined by the series the race is held under. If a race is a part of two or more series at the same time (e.g. TCR World Tour with the host series), it will be considered as part of the series with highest coefficient for the ranking.

Importance coefficient tables
Coefficient	Series
5	International series/events TCR World Tour/World Touring Car Cup, FIA Motorsport Games
4.5	Regional series TCR Asia, TCR Eastern Europe, TCR Europe, TCR South America
4	National series TCR Australia, TCR Brazil, TCR China, TCR Denmark, TCR Germany (2021-2022), TCR Italy, TCR Japan (2021-2024), TCR Mexico, TCR Panama, TCR Russia, TCR Scandinavia (2021-2022), TCR Spain, TCR Taipei, TCR UK
3	Endurance series/events Michelin Pilot Challenge, TCR European Endurance, TCR Mexico, CTCC Cup, 24H TCE Series (2021-2024), Campeonato de España de Resistencia, Super Taikyu, Nürburgring Langstrecken-Serie, Nürburgring 24 Hours (and qualifying races), 1006 km Palanga
2	Other Sprint series/events TC France, Canadian TCC / SCCC, Coppa Italia Turismo

=== Participation coefficient ===
The participation coefficient is determined by the number of entered TCR cars in the race.

Participation coefficient tables
Entries	Coefficient
1 to 5	1
6 to 10	1.5
11 to 15	2
16 to 20	2.5
>20	3

=== Finishing points ===
Finishing position of the race will award points according to the following scale:

Position	1st	2nd	3rd	4th	5th	6th	7th	8th	9th	10th	11th	12th	13th	14th	15th	16th	17th	18th	19th	20th+
Races	45	40	35	30	25	20	18	16	14	12	10	9	8	7	6	5	4	3	2	1

Driver must be classified as finisher of the race to get points. If a car is driven by two or more drivers, all drivers get full points for their position. If a race is a part of multi-class event, position is counted relative to the TCR class.

=== Driver's total ===
A driver's total points is the sum of their last 20 races. If the driver didn't take part in any TCR event for the last 30 weeks or more, one oldest race result will be dropped for every week of inactivity thereafter.

== Rankings ==
Top 15 as of 18 March 2026
No	Driver	Manufacturer	Points	Series
1	(France) Yann Ehrlacher	Lynk & Co	108.62	2025 TCR World Tour
2	(Sweden) Thed Björk	Lynk & Co	105.84	2025 TCR World Tour
3	(China) David Zhu	Lynk & Co	104.23	2025 TCR China; 2024 TCR World Tour; 2024 TCR China
4	(China) Jason Zhang	Lynk & Co	98.67	2025 TCR China; 2024 TCR World Tour; 2024 TCR China
5	(Argentina) Esteban Guerrieri	Honda	90.14	2025 TCR World Tour
6	(Argentina) Néstor Girolami	Hyundai	79.38	2026 TCR South America; 2025 TCR World Tour; 2025 TCR European Endurance
7	(Uruguay) Santiago Urrutia	Lynk & Co	78.25	2025 TCR World Tour
8	(United Kingdom) Jenson Brickley	CUPRA	75.01	2025 TCR Europe; 2025 TCR Spain
9	(France) Aurélien Comte	CUPRA	73.90	2025 TCR World Tour
10	(Czech Republic) Adam Kout	Hyundai	72.79	2025 TCR Eastern Europe; 2024 FIA Motorsport Games; 2024 TCR Eastern Europe
11	(Australia) Josh Buchan	Hyundai	72.07	2026 Michelin Pilot Challenge; 2025 TCR World Tour; 2024 TCR Australia
12	(China) Zhang Zhendong	Hyundai	71.26	2025 TCR Asia; 2025 TCR China; 2024 TCR World Tour; 2024 TCR Asia; 2024 24 Hours of Nürburgring
13	(United Kingdom) Adam Shepherd	CUPRA	71.04	2025 TCR Spain; 2025 TCR UK; 2024 TCR UK
14	(Argentina) Leonel Pernía	Honda	69.37	2026 TCR South America; 2025 TCR World Tour; 2025 TCR South America
15	(China) Ma Qinghua	Lynk & Co	69.13	2025 TCR World Tour
