= 2024 TCR World Ranking Final =

Autódromo de Algarve, the circuit where the event was planned to take place.

The 2024 TCR World Ranking Final was set to be an automobile racing event that was planned to take place in March 2024 at the Algarve Circuit in Portimao, Portugal. The entries were planned to consist of the top 15 drivers in the 2023 TCR World Tour and the top 45 drivers as listed by the TCR World Ranking (not including those already in the top 15 of the TCR World Tour). In total, 60 drivers were planned to compete over the course of the event.

The Algarve circuit was announced as the host for the final on 16 October 2023. On 26 January 2024, it was announced that the inaugural TCR World Ranking Final was placed on hold, and in November 2024 the event was cancelled due to conflict with that year's FIA Motorsport Games.

== Entry list ==
The top 15 drivers in the 2023 TCR World Tour and next best 45 drivers in TCR World Ranking list of 4 October 2023 qualified for the event, with further 20 drivers in the Ranking and up to 30 Wild Card drivers included in reserves list.

WT	Rank	Driver	Team	Car	Series
TCR World Tour qualifiers
1	3	(Hungary) Norbert Michelisz	(Italy) BRC Hyundai N Squadra Corse	Hyundai Elantra N TCR	TCR World Tour
2	2	(France) Yann Ehrlacher	(Sweden) Cyan Racing Lynk & Co	Lynk & Co 03 FL TCR	TCR World Tour
3	1	(United Kingdom) Robert Huff	(Belgium) Audi Sport Team Comtoyou (Switzerland) Autorama Motorsport by Wolf-Power Racing	Audi RS 3 LMS TCR (2021)	TCR World Tour; 24H TCE Series - TCR; 24H Middle East Trophy - TCE
4	4	(Belgium) Frédéric Vervisch	(Belgium) Audi Sport Team Comtoyou	Audi RS 3 LMS TCR (2021)	TCR World Tour
5	5	(Spain) Mikel Azcona	(Italy) BRC Hyundai N Squadra Corse (South Korea) Hyundai Motorsport N	Hyundai Elantra N TCR	TCR World Tour; 24 Hours of Nürburgring - TCR
6	7	(Argentina) Néstor Girolami	(Estonia) ALM Motorsport (Argentina) Squadra Martino Racing (Australia) Honda Wall Racing (Macau) MacPro Racing	Honda Civic Type R TCR (FL5)	TCR World Tour
7	8	(Sweden) Thed Björk	(Sweden) Cyan Racing Lynk & Co	Lynk & Co 03 FL TCR	TCR World Tour
8	9	(Uruguay) Santiago Urrutia	(Sweden) Cyan Racing Lynk & Co	Lynk & Co 03 FL TCR	TCR World Tour
9	6	(China) Ma Qing Hua	(Sweden) Cyan Racing Lynk & Co (China) Shell Teamwork Lynk & Co Racing	Lynk & Co 03 FL TCR; Lynk & Co 03 TCR	TCR World Tour; TCR China
10	25	(Australia) Will Brown	(Australia) MPC – Team Liqui Moly	Audi RS 3 LMS TCR (2021)	TCR Australia
11	18	(France) John Filippi	(Belgium) Comtoyou Racing	Audi RS 3 LMS TCR (2021)	TCR Europe
12	44	(Australia) Tony D'Alberto	(Australia) Honda Wall Racing	Honda Civic Type R TCR (FL5)	TCR Australia
13	11	(Netherlands) Tom Coronel	(Belgium) Comtoyou Racing	Audi RS 3 LMS TCR (2021)	TCR Europe
14	31	(Belgium) Kobe Pauwels	(Belgium) Comtoyou Racing	Audi RS 3 LMS TCR (2021)	TCR Europe
15	43	(Australia) Aaron Cameron	(Australia) GRM Team Valvoline	Peugeot 308 TCR	TCR Australia
TCR World Ranking qualifiers
23	10	(Italy) Kevin Ceccon	(Italy) Team Aggressive Italia	Hyundai Elantra N TCR	TCR Europe
-	11	(Netherlands) Niels Langeveld	(Italy) MM Motorsport	Honda Civic Type R TCR (FL5)	TCR Italy
-	12	(Slovakia) Maťo Homola	(Czech Republic) Janik Motorsport	Hyundai Elantra N TCR	TCR Eastern Europe
-	13	(Argentina) Franco Girolami	(Italy) Aikoa Racing	Audi RS 3 LMS TCR (2021); Audi RS 3 LMS TCR (2017)	TCR Italy; 24H TCE Series - TCR
26	16	(Argentina) Ignacio Montenegro	(Argentina) Squadra Martino	Honda Civic Type R TCR (FK8)	TCR South America
-	17	(Denmark) Kasper H. Jensen	(Denmark) GMB Motorsport	Honda Civic Type R TCR (FK8)	TCR Denmark
-	18	(Denmark) Nicolai Sylvest	(Denmark) GMB Motorsport	Honda Civic Type R TCR (FK8)	TCR Denmark
-	19	(United Kingdom) Bruce Winfield	(United Kingdom) Area Motorsport	Hyundai i30 N TCR	TCR UK
38	21	(United Kingdom) Isaac Smith	(Spain) Volcano Motorsport	Audi RS 3 LMS TCR (2021)	TCR Europe
-	22	(Denmark) Jan Magnussen	(Denmark) Team Auto Lounge Racing	Cupra León Competición TCR	TCR Denmark
-	23	(United Kingdom) Jack Young	(Macau) Dongfeng Honda MacPro Racing Team	Honda Civic Type R TCR (FK8); Honda Civic Type R TCR (FL5)	TCR China
-	24	(Germany) Mike Halder	(Sweden) TPR Motorsport (Germany) Halder Motorsport	Audi RS 3 LMS TCR (2021); Honda Civic Type R TCR (FK8)	TCR Denmark; Nürburgring Langstrecken-Serie - TCR
33	25	(Uruguay) Juan Manuel Casella	(Argentina) Squadra Martino	Honda Civic Type R TCR (FK8); Honda Civic Type R TCR (FL5)	TCR South America
-	26	(Denmark) Martin Andersen	(Denmark) Outzen Motorsport	Hyundai i30 N TCR	TCR Denmark
-	27	(United Kingdom) Jac Constable	(United Kingdom) Rob Boston Racing	Audi RS 3 LMS TCR (2021)	TCR UK
-	28	(Germany) René Kircher	(Germany) Mertel Motorsport	Honda Civic Type R TCR (FK8)	TCR Eastern Europe
29	29	(Brazil) Raphael Reis	(Brazil) W2 ProGP	Cupra León Competición TCR	TCR South America
-	31	(United Kingdom) Adam Shepherd	(United Kingdom) Area Motorsport	Hyundai i30 N TCR	TCR UK
-	33	(United Kingdom) Alex Ley	(United Kingdom) Area Motorsport with Daniel James	Hyundai i30 N TCR	TCR UK
-	34	(Poland) Bartosz Groszek	(Slovakia) Aditis Racing	Audi RS 3 LMS TCR (2021)	TCR Eastern Europe
53	35	(Italy) Nicola Baldan	(Italy) Team Aggressive Italia (Italy) Aikoa Racing	Hyundai Elantra N TCR; Audi RS 3 LMS TCR (2017)	TCR Europe; 24H TCE Series - TCR
-	36	(Argentina) Fabricio Pezzini	(Argentina) Paladini Racing	Audi RS 3 LMS TCR (2017)	TCR South America
-	37	(Sweden) Kevin Engman	(Denmark) Team Auto Lounge Racing	Audi RS 3 LMS TCR (2021)	TCR Denmark
-	38	(Denmark) Michael Markussen	(Denmark) Markussen Racing	CUPRA León Competición TCR	TCR Denmark
-	39	(Italy) Salvatore Tavano	(Italy) Scuderia del Girasole CUPRA Racing	CUPRA León Competición TCR	TCR Italy (2022)
-	41	(Denmark) Gustav Birch	(Denmark) GMB Motorsport	Honda Civic Type R TCR (FK8)	TCR Denmark
17	42	(Australia) Bailey Sweeny	(Australia) HMO Customer Racing	Hyundai i30 N TCR	TCR Australia
10*	43	(Australia) Will Brown	(Australia) MPC – Team Liqui Moly	Audi RS 3 LMS TCR (2021)	TCR Australia
-	44	(France) Nathanaël Berthon	(Belgium) Comtoyou Racing	Audi RS 3 LMS TCR (2021)	World Touring Car Cup (2022)
-	45	(United Kingdom) Carl Boardley	(United Kingdom) CBM with Hart GT	Cupra León Competición TCR	TCR UK
25	46	(Italy) Marco Butti	(Italy) Target Competition	Hyundai Elantra N TCR	TCR Italy; TCR Europe
-	47	(Sweden) Robert Dahlgren	(Sweden) CUPRA Dealer Team – PWR Racing	Cupra León Competición TCR	TCR Scandinavia (2022)
-	48	(Czech Republic) Petr Čížek	(Czech Republic) Express Auto Racing	Cupra León Competición TCR	TCR Eastern Europe
40	49	(Estonia) Ruben Volt	(Estonia) ALM Motorsport	Honda Civic Type R TCR (FK8); Honda Civic Type R TCR (FL5)	TCR Europe; TCR Italy; TCR World Tour
-	50	(United Kingdom) Josh Files	(United Kingdom) Area Motorsport	Hyundai Elantra N TCR	TCR UK
-	51	(Italy) Michele Imberti	(Italy) CRM Motorsport	Hyundai i30 N TCR	TCR Italy
-	52	(Germany) Sebastian Steibel	(Slovakia) Aditis Racing	Audi RS 3 LMS TCR (2021)	TCR Eastern Europe
-	53	(Belgium) Gilles Magnus	(Belgium) Audi Sport Team Comtoyou	Audi RS 3 LMS TCR (2021)	World Touring Car Cup (2022)
-	54	(Denmark) Silas Rytter	(Denmark) Insight Racing	Hyundai i30 N TCR	TCR Denmark
-	55	(United Kingdom) Chris Smiley	(United Kingdom) Restart Racing	Honda Civic Type R TCR (FL5)	TCR UK
-	56	(Italy) Denis Babuin	(Italy) Bolza Corse	Audi RS 3 LMS TCR (2021)	TCR Italy
-	57	(Italy) Felice Jelmini	(Italy) PMA Motorsport	Audi RS 3 LMS TCR (2021)	TCR Italy; TCR Europe
35	58	(United Kingdom) Lewis Brown	(United Kingdom) Chameleon Motorsport (Belgium) Comtoyou Racing	Cupra León Competición TCR; Audi RS 3 LMS TCR (2021)	TCR Europe; TCR UK; TCR Spain
-	59	(Japan) "Hirobon"	(Japan) Birth Racing Project	Cupra León Competición TCR	TCR Japan
-	60	(United Kingdom) Lewis Kent	(United Kingdom) Essex & Kent Motorsport	Hyundai Veloster N TCR	TCR UK (2022)
TCR World Ranking reserves
-	61	(Sweden) Tobias Brink	(Sweden) Brink Motorsport	Audi RS 3 LMS TCR (2021)	TCR Scandinavia (2022)
16	62	(Australia) Josh Buchan	(Australia) HMO Customer Racing	Hyundai Elantra N TCR	TCR Australia
-	63	(Czech Republic) Adam Kout	(Czech Republic) Janik Motorsport	Hyundai Elantra N TCR	TCR Eastern Europe
-	64	(Czech Republic) Jáchym Galáš	(Czech Republic) Janik Motorsport	Hyundai Elantra N TCR	TCR Europe (2022); TCR Eastern Europe (2022)
-	65	(Lithuania) Jonas Karklys	(Lithuania) Nordpass	Hyundai i30 N TCR	24H Middle East Trophy - TCE
48	66	(France) Aurélien Comte	(France) SP Compétition	Cupra León Competición TCR	TCR Italy; TCR Europe
31	67	(North Macedonia) Viktor Davidovski	(Belgium) Comtoyou Racing	Audi RS 3 LMS TCR (2021)	TCR Europe
45	68	(Argentina) José Manuel Sapag	Toyota Team Argentina	Toyota GR Corolla Sport TCR	TCR South America
-	69	(United Kingdom) Jenson Brickley	(United Kingdom) Jenson Brickley Racing	Cupra León Competición TCR	TCR UK
-	70	(United Kingdom) Bradley Hutchison	(United Kingdom) bond-It with MPHR	Audi RS 3 LMS TCR (2017); Cupra León Competición TCR	TCR UK; British Endurance Championship - TCR
-	71	Dmitry Bragin (Note: Dmitry Bragin and TAIF Motorsport / AG Team are Russian, but they compete as neutral competitors as Russian national emblems were banned by the following FIA due to the Russian invasion of Ukraine.)	TAIF Motorsport / AG Team	Cupra León Competición TCR	TCR Russia
-	72	(Sweden) Andreas Bäckman	(Sweden) Lestrup Racing Team	Audi RS 3 LMS TCR (2021)	TCR Scandinavia (2022)
-	73	(Denmark) Philip Lindberg	(Denmark) PL Racing (Estonia) ALM Motorsport	Honda Civic Type R TCR (FL5)	TCR Denmark; TCR World Tour
-	74	(Georgia (country)) Davit Kajaia	(Germany) Mertel Motorsport	Honda Civic Type R TCR (FK8)	TCR Eastern Europe
15*	75	(Australia) Aaron Cameron	(Australia) GRM Team Valvoline	Peugeot 308 TCR	TCR Australia
41	76	(Spain) Rubén Fernández	(Spain) RC2 Racing Team	Audi RS 3 LMS TCR (2021)	TCR Europe; TCR Italy; TCR Spain
36	77	(Australia) Jordan Cox	(Australia) GRM – Schaeffler	Peugeot 308 TCR	TCR Australia
-	78	(United States) Harry Gottsacker	(United States) Bryan Herta Autosport with Curb-Agajanian (South Korea) Hyundai Motorsport N	Hyundai Elantra N TCR	Michelin Pilot Challenge - TCR; 24 Hours of Nürburgring - TCR
-	79	(Australia) Jay Hanson	(Australia) Melbourne Performance Centre	Audi RS 3 LMS TCR (2021)	TCR Australia (2022)
30	80	(Brazil) Galid Osman	(Brazil) W2 ProGP	Cupra León Competición TCR	TCR South America
Wild Card drivers
19	13	(Argentina) Bernardo Llaver	Toyota Team Argentina	Toyota GR Corolla Sport TCR	TCR South America
21	27	(Argentina) Juan Ángel Rosso	(Argentina) Paladini Racing (Belgium) Comtoyou Racing	Toyota GR Corolla Sport TCR; Audi RS 3 LMS TCR (2021)	TCR South America; TCR Spain
20	49	(Argentina) Esteban Guerrieri	(Argentina) Bratton Tito Bessone Team	Toyota GR Corolla Sport TCR	TCR South America
39	85	(Brazil) Pedro Cardoso	(Brazil) Hyundai N Team Scuderia Chiarelli	Hyundai Elantra N TCR	TCR South America
47	149	(Sweden) Viktor Andersson	(Sweden) MA:GP	Lynk & Co 03 TCR	TCR Europe
-	161	(United Kingdom) Scott Sumpton	(United Kingdom) Restart Racing (Estonia) ALM Motorsport	Honda Civic Type R TCR (FK8); Honda Civic Type R TCR (FL5)	TCR UK; TCR Spain; British Endurance Championship - TCR
-	306	(Sweden) Christian Skaar	(Denmark) Team Auto Lounge Racing	Audi RS 3 LMS TCR (2021)	TCR Denmark

- World Ranking position shown are from list of 4 October 2023 for TCR World Ranking qualifiers and reserves, and from list of 13 November 2023 for TCR World Tour qualifiers and Wild Card drivers
