= Eric Gené =

Spanish racing driver (born 2007)

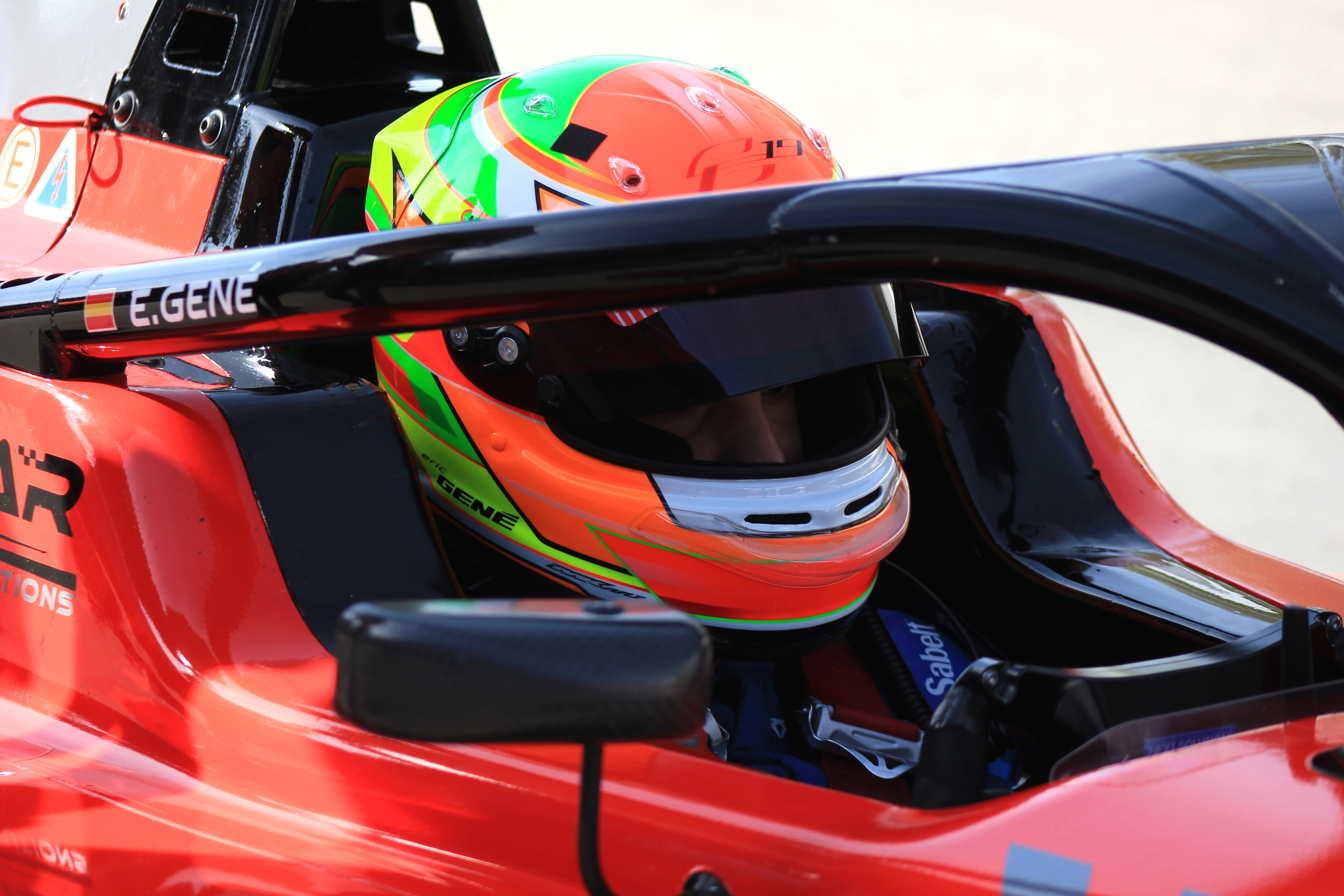
- Gené in 2023
- Nationality: (Spain) Spanish
- Born: 3 March 2007 (age 19) Barcelona, Spain
- Relatives: Jordi Gené (father); Marc Gené (uncle)
- Categorisation: FIA Silver

Eric Gené Casanovas (born 3 March 2007) is a Spanish racing driver who competes for BMW Promotion Motorsport in the Supercars Endurance Series. He is the son of Jordi Gené, as well as the 2025 TCR Spain runner-up.

== Personal life ==
Gené is the son of touring car racer Jordi Gené, and nephew of former Formula One driver Marc Gené, brother of Jordi.

== Career ==
Gené began karting in 2017. During his karting career, Gené most notably won the 2020 LeCont Trophy and finished third in the 2021 IAME International Games, both in X30 Junior.

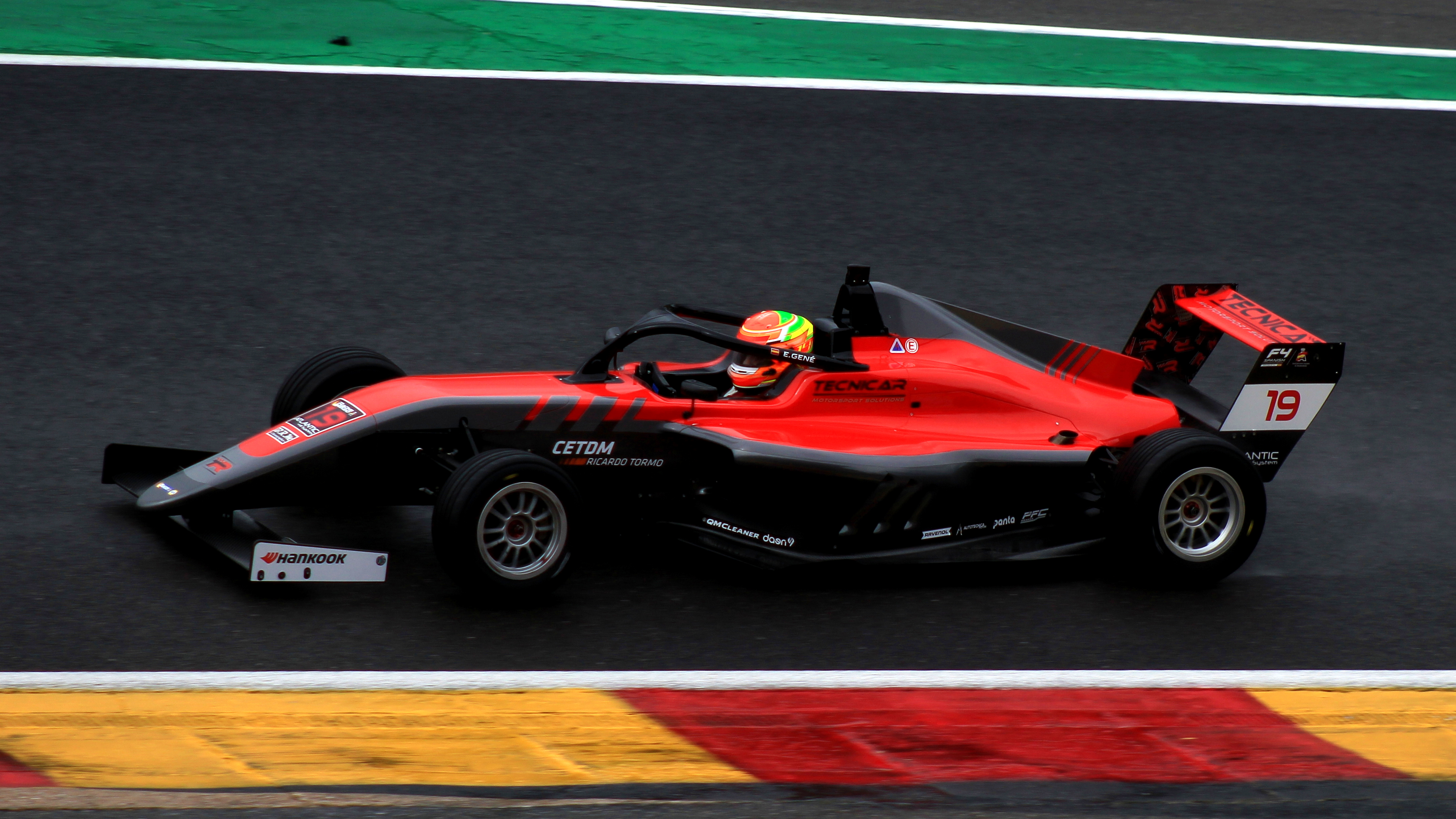
Gené racing for Tecnicar at Spa in Spanish F4 in 2023.

During his final year of karting in 2022, Gené made his car racing debut in the last round of GT-CER for Monlau Motorsport alongside his father Jordi, winning in Class 1 aboard a Cupra León TCR. In 2023, Gené joined Tecnicar - Fórmula de Campeones to race in the F4 Spanish Championship, in which he took a best result of 13th in race three at Spa.

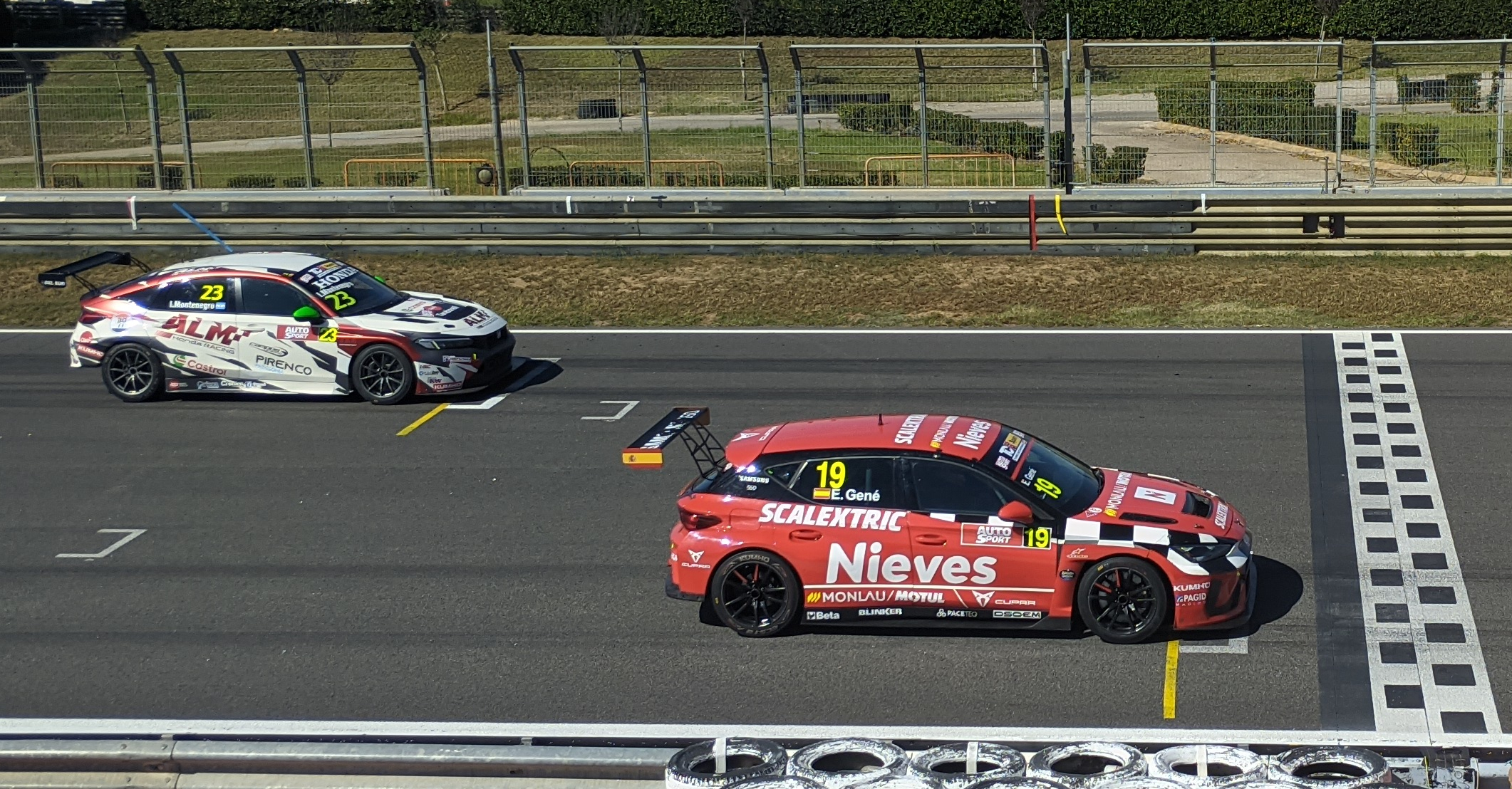
Gené leading Ignacio Montenegro from pole at Valencia in TCR Spain in 2024.

Moving to TCR Touring Car competition for 2024, Gené reunited with Monlau to race in the TCR Spain winter and main series. Gené began the year by finishing runner-up to Ignacio Montenegro in the Winter Series with a win at Valencia, before scoring a pair of second-place finishes at Estoril and Valencia to finish fourth in the main season's points. During 2024, Gené also made a one-off appearance in TCR Europe for Monlau, as well as representing Spain in the FIA Motorsport Games Touring Car Cup discipline. Continuing with Monlau for 2025, Gené raced with them for a dual campaign in TCR Spain and TCR Europe. In the former, Gené won twice at Barcelona to secure runner-up honours behind Mike Halder, while in Europe he secured a fourth-place points finish with a lone win at the Red Bull Ring from pole position. During 2025, Gené also made his TCR World Tour debut at Valencia for Monlau.

In 2026, Gené switched to SRO GT4 competition, as he partnered up with Jan Duran to compete in the Supercars Endurance Series for BMW Promotion Motorsport, as an official driver for BMW España.

== Karting record ==
=== Karting career summary ===
Season	Series	Team	Position
2017	Spanish Karting Championship — Alevin		13th
2018	WSK Champions Cup — 60 Mini	M2 Racing Karts	90th
2018	South Garda Winter Cup — Mini Rok	M2 Racing Karts	67th
2018	WSK Super Master Series — 60 Mini	Praga Junior Team	108th
2020	IAME Winter Cup — X30 Junior	M2 Racing Karts	NC
2020	South Garda Winter Cup — OK-J	CRG Racing Team	64th
2020	WSK Super Master Series – OK-J	CRG Racing Team	89th
2020	Champions of the Future — OK-J	CRG Racing Team	49th
2020	Karting European Championship — OK-J	CRG Racing Team	68th
2020	LeCont Trophy — X30 Junior	MOL Racing	1st
2020	IAME International Games — X30 Junior	MOL Racing	23rd
2021	IAME Winter Cup — X30 Junior	MOL Racing	9th
2021	IAME Euro Series — X30 Junior	MOL Racing	17th
2021	Champions of the Future — OK-J	Parolin Motorsport	109th
2021	Karting European Championship — OK-J	Parolin Motorsport	NC
2021	Karting World Championship — OK-J	Parolin Motorsport	40th
2021	IAME International Games — X30 Junior	MOL Racing	3rd
2022	IAME Winter Cup — X30 Senior	MOL Racing	26th
2022	Spanish Karting Championship — Senior	MOL Racing	7th
2022	IAME Euro Series — X30 Senior	MOL Racing	59th
2022	Karting European Championship — OK	Parolin Motorsport	56th

== Racing record ==
=== Racing career summary ===
Season	Series	Team	Races	Wins	Poles	F/Laps	Podiums	Points	Position
2022	GT-CER – Class 1	Monlau Motorsport	1	1	0	0	1	0	NC†
2023	F4 Spanish Championship	Tecnicar - Fórmula de Campeones	21	0	0	0	0	0	31st
2024	TCR Spain Winter Series	Monlau Motorsport	4	1	2	1	4	160	**2nd**
2024	TCR Spain Touring Car Championship	Monlau Motorsport	8	0	1	0	2	118	5th
2024	TCR Europe Touring Car Series	Monlau Motorsport	2	0	0	0	0	5	22nd
2024	FIA Motorsport Games Touring Car Cup	Team Spain	1	0	0	0	0	—N/a	4th
2025	TCR Spain Touring Car Championship	Monlau Motorsport	10	2	2	1	5	313	**2nd**
2025	TCR Europe Touring Car Series	Monlau Motorsport	12	1	1	1	2	192	4th
2025	TCR World Tour	Monlau Motorsport	3	0	0	0	0	3	41st
2026	Supercars Endurance Series – GT4 Pro	BMW Promotion Motorsport						*	*

* Season still in progress.

=== Complete F4 Spanish Championship results ===
(key) (Races in bold indicate pole position) (Races in italics indicate fastest lap)

Year	Team	1	2	3	4	5	6	7	8	9	10	11	12	13	14	15	16	17	18	19	20	21	DC	Points
2023	Tecnicar - Fórmula de Campeones	SPA; 1; 25	SPA; 2; 22	SPA; 3; 13	ARA; 1; 21	ARA; 2; 18	ARA; 3; 17	NAV; 1; 19	NAV; 2; 23	NAV; 3 Ret	JER; 1; 22	JER; 2; 16	JER; 3; 22	EST; 1; 17	EST; 2; 23	EST; 3; 22	CRT; 1; 23	CRT; 2; 24	CRT; 3 Ret	CAT; 1; 16	CAT; 2; 26	CAT; 3; 23	31st	0

=== Complete TCR Europe Touring Car Series results ===
(key) (Races in bold indicate pole position) (Races in italics indicate fastest lap)

Year	Team	Car	1	2	3	4	5	6	7	8	9	10	11	12	DC	Points
2024	Monlau Motorsport	Cupra León VZ TCR	VAL; 1	VAL; 2	ZOL; 1 WD	ZOL; 2 WD	SAL; 1	SAL; 2	SPA; 1; 13	SPA; 2 Ret	BRN; 1	BRN; 2	CRT; 1	CRT; 2	22nd	5
2025	Monlau Motorsport	Cupra León VZ TCR	PRT; 1; 5^{3}	PRT; 2 Ret	SPA; 1; 4^{2}	SPA; 2; 8	HOC; 1; 5^{5}	HOC; 2; 5	MIS; 1; 18	MIS; 2; 2	**RBR**; **1**; 1^{1}	RBR; 2; 13	CAT; 1; 9^{5}	CAT; 2; 9	4th	192
