= 2025 TCR Spain Touring Car Championship =

Motor racing competition

The 2025 TCR Spain Touring Car Championship season was the fifth season of the TCR Spain Touring Car Championship.

== Calendar ==
The calendar for the 2025 season was announced on 3 December 2024.

Rnd.		Circuit/Location	Date	Supporting
NC	–	Circuit Ricardo Tormo, Valencia, Valencian Community	14–16 February	GT Winter Series; GT4 Winter Series; Formula Winter Series
1	1	Circuit de Barcelona-Catalunya, Montmeló, Catalonia	14–16 March	6 Hours of Barcelona
1	2	Circuit de Barcelona-Catalunya, Montmeló, Catalonia	14–16 March	6 Hours of Barcelona
2	3	MotorLand Aragón, Alcañiz, Aragon	28–30 March	F4 Spanish Championship; EuroCup-3 Winter Series; Campeonato de España de GT; Copa Clio España
2	4	MotorLand Aragón, Alcañiz, Aragon	28–30 March	F4 Spanish Championship; EuroCup-3 Winter Series; Campeonato de España de GT; Copa Clio España
3	5	Circuit Ricardo Tormo, Valencia, Valencian Community	13–15 June	TCR World Tour; Porsche Sprint Challenge Iberica; Campeonato de España de Turismos
3	6	Circuit Ricardo Tormo, Valencia, Valencian Community	13–15 June	TCR World Tour; Porsche Sprint Challenge Iberica; Campeonato de España de Turismos
4	7	Circuito de Jerez, Jerez de la Frontera, Andalusia	19–21 September	F4 Spanish Championship; EuroCup-3; Campeonato de España de GT
4	8	Circuito de Jerez, Jerez de la Frontera, Andalusia	19–21 September	F4 Spanish Championship; EuroCup-3; Campeonato de España de GT
5	9	Circuit de Barcelona-Catalunya, Montmeló, Catalonia	14–16 November	F4 Spanish Championship; EuroCup-3; Campeonato de España de GT; Copa Clio España
5	10	Circuit de Barcelona-Catalunya, Montmeló, Catalonia	14–16 November	F4 Spanish Championship; EuroCup-3; Campeonato de España de GT; Copa Clio España

== Teams and drivers ==
Team	Car	No.	Drivers	Class	Rounds
(Estonia) ALM Motorsport	Honda Civic Type R TCR (FL5)	5	(Turkey) Demir Eröge	M	All
(Estonia) ALM Motorsport	Honda Civic Type R TCR (FL5)	27	(Estonia) Ruben Volt	J	NC, 1–2
(Estonia) ALM Motorsport	Honda Civic Type R TCR (FL5)	79	(Estonia) Sven Karuse		4–5
(Estonia) ALM Motorsport	Honda Civic Type R TCR (FL5)	237	(Estonia) Sten-Dorian Piirimägi		All
(Spain) Team VRT	Audi RS 3 LMS TCR (2021)	9	(Spain) Igor Urien		2
(Spain) Team VRT	Audi RS 3 LMS TCR (2021)	10	(Spain) Sergio Casalins		3
(Spain) Team VRT	Audi RS 3 LMS TCR (2021)	11	(Spain) Quique Bordas		3
(Spain) Team VRT	Peugeot 308 Racing Cup	21	(Spain) Daniel Losada		3
(Spain) Team VRT	Peugeot 308 Racing Cup	89	(Latvia) Aleksandrs Bobrovs		NC
(Spain) Team VRT	Peugeot 308 Racing Cup	110	(Spain) Adrián Agote		NC
(Spain) RX Pro Racing	Hyundai i30 N TCR	11	(Spain) Busián Fontán		5
(Spain) RX Pro Racing	Hyundai i30 N TCR	55	(Colombia) Juan Felipe Pedraza	J	NC
(Spain) RX Pro Racing	Hyundai i30 N TCR	95	(Spain) Marco Aguilera		3
(Spain) RC2 Racing Team	Honda Civic Type R TCR (FL5)	12	(Spain) Rubén Fernández Gil	M	1–2, 5
(Spain) RC2 Racing Team	Honda Civic Type R TCR (FL5)	18	(Denmark) Michael Markussen		3–5
(Spain) RC2 Racing Team	Honda Civic Type R TCR (FL5)	19	(Spain) Felipe Fernández Gil		NC, 1–2, 4–5
(Spain) RC2 Racing Team	Honda Civic Type R TCR (FL5)	45	(Spain) Víctor Fernández Gil	M	NC, 1–4
(Spain) RC2 Racing Team	Honda Civic Type R TCR (FL5)	72	(Italy) Sandro Pelatti		NC, 5
(Spain) RC2 Racing Team	Honda Civic Type R TCR (FL5)	333	(Spain) Santiago Concepción	J	2
(Spain) Monlau Motorsport	Cupra León VZ TCR	17	(United Kingdom) Adam Shepherd		5
(Spain) Monlau Motorsport	Cupra León VZ TCR	28	(Spain) Eric Gené	J	All
(Spain) Monlau Motorsport	Cupra León VZ TCR	77	(Brazil) Raphael Reis		4
(Spain) Monlau Motorsport	Cupra León VZ TCR	81	(Spain) Erik Zabala	J	1–2
(Spain) Monlau Motorsport	Cupra León VZ TCR	246	(United Kingdom) Jenson Brickley	J	All
(Denmark) Markussen Racing	Honda Civic Type R TCR (FL5)	18	(Denmark) Michael Markussen		1–2, 5
(France) Team Clairet Sport	Audi RS 3 LMS TCR (2021)	20	(France) Sébastien Thome		All
(France) Team Clairet Sport	Cupra León VZ TCR	33	(France) Samuel Chaligne	M	All
(France) Team Clairet Sport	Audi RS 3 LMS TCR (2021)	44	(France) Veenesh Shunker	M	1–3
(France) Team Clairet Sport	Audi RS 3 LMS TCR (2021)	117	(France) Guillaume Savoldelli	M	NC, 1–3
(France) SP Compétition	Cupra León VZ TCR	34	(Belgium) Giovanni Scamardi		1, 5
(France) SP Compétition	Cupra León VZ TCR	38	(France) Tom Pussier	J	1
(Sweden) TPR Motorsport	Honda Civic Type R TCR (FL5)	41	(Denmark) Rene Povlsen	M	All
(Sweden) TPR Motorsport	Honda Civic Type R TCR (FL5)	777	(Germany) Mike Halder		All
(Spain) Lova Motorsport	Audi RS 3 LMS TCR (2021)	63	(Spain) Miguel Ángel Romero	J	4
(Spain) Casal Competición	Cupra León TCR	63	(Spain) Miguel Ángel Romero	J	NC
(Spain) Casal Competición	Cupra León TCR	70	(Spain) Santi Castilla		3
(United Kingdom) Area Motorsport	Cupra León VZ TCR	100	(United Kingdom) Steve Laidlaw		NC, 5
(United Kingdom) Area Motorsport	Cupra León VZ TCR	101	(United Kingdom) Sam Laidlaw		NC, 5

Icon	Class
J	Junior Trophy
M	Master Trophy

== Results ==
Rnd.		Circuit	Pole position	Fastest lap	Winning driver	Winning team
NC	1	(Spain) Circuit Ricardo Tormo, Valencia, Valencian Community	(Estonia) Ruben Volt	(Estonia) Ruben Volt	(Estonia) Ruben Volt	(Estonia) ALM Motorsport
NC	2	(Spain) Circuit Ricardo Tormo, Valencia, Valencian Community		(Estonia) Ruben Volt	(Estonia) Ruben Volt	(Estonia) ALM Motorsport
1	3	(Spain) Circuit de Barcelona-Catalunya, Montmeló, Catalonia	(Spain) Eric Gené	(Germany) Mike Halder	(Germany) Mike Halder	(Sweden) TPR Motorsport
1	4	(Spain) Circuit de Barcelona-Catalunya, Montmeló, Catalonia		(Spain) Felipe Fernández Gil	(Spain) Eric Gené	(Spain) Monlau Motorsport
2	5	(Spain) MotorLand Aragón, Alcañiz, Aragon	(Germany) Mike Halder		(Germany) Mike Halder	(Sweden) TPR Motorsport
2	6	(Spain) MotorLand Aragón, Alcañiz, Aragon		(Estonia) Sten-Dorian Piirimägi	(Estonia) Sten-Dorian Piirimägi	(Estonia) ALM Motorsport
3	7	(Spain) Circuit Ricardo Tormo, Valencia, Valencian Community	(Estonia) Sten-Dorian Piirimägi	(Germany) Mike Halder	(Germany) Mike Halder	(Sweden) TPR Motorsport
3	8	(Spain) Circuit Ricardo Tormo, Valencia, Valencian Community		(France) Sebastien Thome	(Germany) Mike Halder	(Sweden) TPR Motorsport
4	9	(Spain) Circuito de Jerez, Jerez de la Frontera, Andalusia	(Germany) Mike Halder	(Germany) Mike Halder	(Germany) Mike Halder	(Sweden) TPR Motorsport
4	10	(Spain) Circuito de Jerez, Jerez de la Frontera, Andalusia		(Denmark) Michael Markussen	(Denmark) Michael Markussen	(Denmark) Markussen Racing
5	11	(Spain) Circuit de Barcelona-Catalunya, Montmeló, Catalonia	(Spain) Eric Gené	(Spain) Eric Gené	(Spain) Eric Gené	(Spain) Monlau Motorsport
5	12	(Spain) Circuit de Barcelona-Catalunya, Montmeló, Catalonia		(Germany) Mike Halder	(United Kingdom) Adam Shepherd	(Spain) Monlau Motorsport

== Championship Standings ==
Scoring system

Position	1st	2nd	3rd	4th	5th	6th	7th	8th	9th	10th	11th	12th	13th	14th	15th
Qualifying	10	7	5	4	3	2	1								
Race	40	35	30	27	24	21	18	15	13	11	9	7	5	3	1

=== Drivers' Championship ===
Pos.	Driver	CRT (Valencian Community)		CAT (Catalonia)		MOT (Aragon)		CRT (Valencian Community)		JER (Andalusia)		CAT (Catalonia)		Drop	Pts.
1	(Germany) Mike Halder			1^{5}	Ret	1^{1}	2	1^{3}	1	1^{1}	2	3^{4}	2		372
2	(Spain) Eric Gené			2^{1}	1	4	4	4^{5}	3	2^{3}	7	1^{1}	6	18	313
3	(United Kingdom) Jenson Brickley			5	Ret	2^{2}	7	2^{6}	4	3^{2}	5	2^{2}	5		278
4	(Spain) Felipe Fernández Gil	10†	6	Ret^{2}	3	3^{5}	3			5^{4}	3	4^{7}	4		216
5	(Denmark) Michael Markussen			4^{6}	2	Ret^{6}	6	Ret^{4}	7	6^{7}	1	9^{6}	12		207
6	(Estonia) Sten-Dorian Piirimägi			6	Ret	7	1	3^{1}	2	7^{5}	6	DSQ^{3}	Ret		201
7	(Spain) Rubén Fernández Gil			9^{4}	4	6^{7}	5					10	3		143
8	(Denmark) Rene Povlsen			7^{7}	8	12	12	10	11	8	13	7^{5}	Ret		115
9	(France) Sebastien Thome			11	9	9	Ret	8	5	14	12	Ret	7		105
10	(Spain) Víctor Fernández Gil	DNS	7	Ret	10	11	10	5^{2}	9	10	8				101
11	(Estonia) Ruben Volt	1	1	3	5	5^{3}	11								92
12	(France) Guillaume Savoldelli	4	4	10	11	8	9	6^{7}	Ret						70
13	(France) Samuel Chaligne	8	8	14	13	15	15	11	12	11	9	Ret	15†		57
14	(Spain) Erik Zabala			8^{3}	7	Ret^{4}	8								57
15	(Brazil) Raphael Reis									4^{6}	4				56
16	(Estonia) Sven Karuse									9	11	11	10		52
17	(Belgium) Giovanni Scamardi			12	6							Ret	8		46
18	(Turkey) Demir Eröge			Ret	Ret	14	Ret	12	Ret	13	Ret	12	13		39
19	(Spain) Marco Aguilera							7	8						33
20	(Spain) Sergio Casalins							9	10						24
21	(Spain) Quique Bordas							Ret	6						21
22	(Spain) Miguel Ángel Romero	7	10							12	10				18
23	(France) Veenesh Shunker			15	12	13	14	15	15						18
24	(Spain) Igor Urien					10	13								16
25	(France) Tom Pussier			13	14										8
25	(Spain) Santi Castilla							13	14						8
25	(Spain) Daniel Losada							14	13						8
-	(Spain) Santi Concepción					DNS	DNS								-
Ineligible for points
	(United Kingdom) Adam Shepherd											5	1		
	(United Kingdom) Sam Laidlaw	2	3									6	11		
	(United Kingdom) Steve Laidlaw	3	2									8	9		
	(Spain) Busián Fontán											13	16†		
	(Italy) Sandro Pelatti	5	5									Ret	14		
Non-championship round only
	(Colombia) Juan Felipe Pedraza	6	11												
	(Spain) Adrián Agote	9	9												
	(Latvia) Aleksandrs Bobrovs	11	DNS												
Pos.	Driver	CRT (Valencian Community)		CAT (Catalonia)		MOT (Aragon)		CRT (Valencian Community)		JER (Andalusia)		CAT (Catalonia)		Drop	Pts.

Colour	Result
Gold	Winner
Silver	Second place
Bronze	Third place
Green	Points classification
Blue	Non-points classification
Blue	Non-classified finish (NC)
Purple	Retired, not classified (Ret)
Red	Did not qualify (DNQ)
Red	Did not pre-qualify (DNPQ)
Black	Disqualified (DSQ)
White	Did not start (DNS)
White	Withdrew (WD)
White	Race cancelled (C)
Blank	Did not practice (DNP)
Blank	Did not arrive (DNA)
Blank	Excluded (EX)

Junior Trophy

Pos.	Driver	Pts.
1	(Spain) Eric Gené	386
2	(United Kingdom) Jenson Brickley	369
3	(Estonia) Ruben Volt	137
4	(Spain) Erik Zabala	99
5	(Spain) Marco Aguilera	65
6	(Spain) Miguel A. Romero	65
7	(France) Tom Pussier	55

Master Trophy

Pos.	Driver	Pts.
1	(Denmark) Rene Povlsen	331
2	(Spain) Víctor Fernández Gil	271
3	(Spain) Rubén Fernández Gil	257
4	(France) Samuel Chaligne	246
5	(France) Guillaume Savoldelli	179
6	(France) Veenesh Shunker	148
7	(Estonia) Sven Karuse	142
8	(Turkey) Demir Eröge	135

=== Teams ===
Pos.	Team	Pts.
1	(Spain) Monlau Motorsport	540
2	(Sweden) TPR Motorsport	447
3	(Spain) RC2 Racing Team	399
4	(Estonia) ALM Motorsport	342
5	(France) Team Clairet Sport	237
6	(Denmark) Markussen Racing	199
7	(Spain) Team VRT	70
8	(France) SP Compétition	64
9	(Spain) RX Pro Racing	33
10	(Spain) Lova Motorsport	22
11	(Spain) Casal Competición	12
