= TCR Europe Touring Car Series =

Touring car racing series

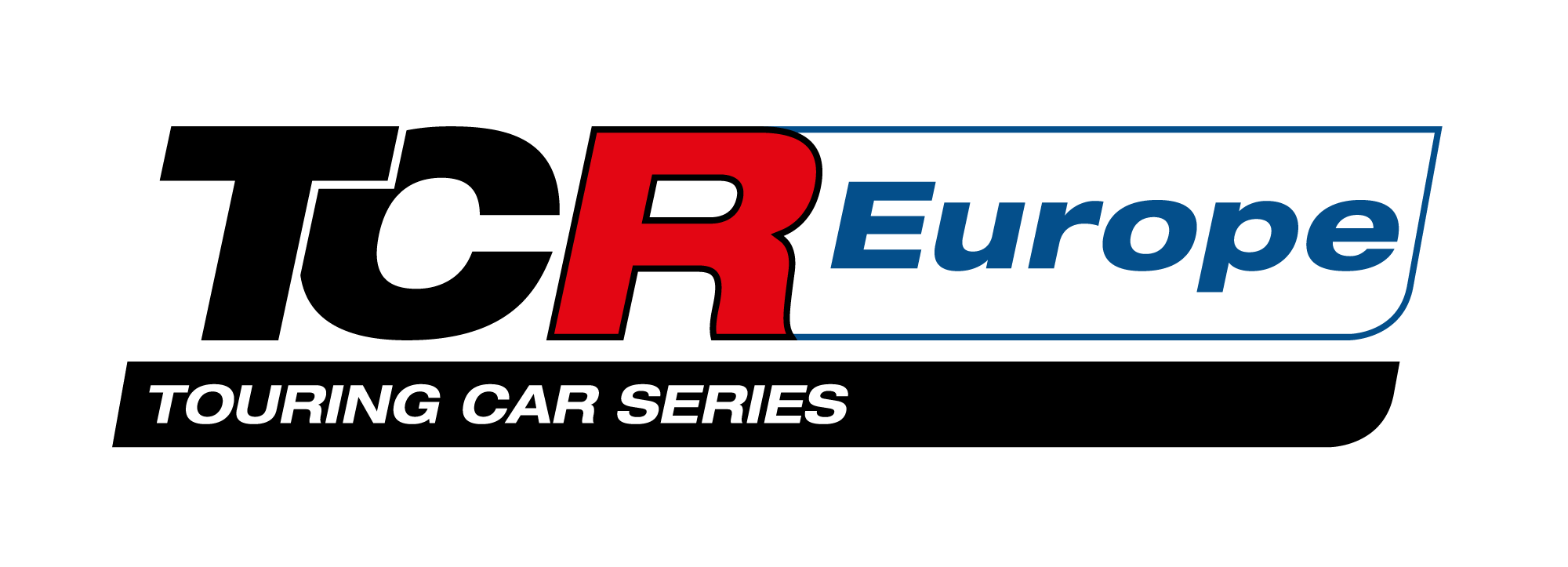
- Category: Touring cars
- Country: Europe
- Inaugural season: 2016
- Tyre suppliers: Kumho Tire
- Drivers' champion: (Italy) Marco Butti
- Teams' champion: (Estonia) ALM Motorsport
- Official website: europe.tcr-series.com

The TCR Europe Touring Car Series is an annual touring car racing event that is held at various locations across Europe. The series is run in accordance with the TCR Touring Car regulations with production-based cars that are front-wheel drive and powered by 2.0-litre turbocharged engines.

== History ==
On 15 October 2015, Marcello Lotti revealed plans for a European Series including one round from each TCR European championship (Italy, Spain, Germany, Portugal, Russia and Benelux), starting from 2016. On 26 February 2016, the European Trophy was launched, with six rounds (Spanish championship was excluded for not having an own series and Benelux series had two rounds). Subsequent change was made during the course of the season to include additional round from the German series.

In 2017, the one-off event format with two races was adopted. For 2018, it was upgraded to TCR Europe Series with seven events, five of which were run in support of the International GT Open. In 2019, the series continued to have seven events all over Europe with approximately 30 cars and was run in support of the International GT Open. Due to the COVID-19 pandemic, the start of the 2020 season was postponed to the end of August and the series was run with support from the SRO Organization with a starting grid of 25 cars.

== Circuits ==
- (Italy) Adria International Raceway (2017)
- (Portugal) Algarve International Circuit (2022–2023, 2025)
- (Czech Republic) Brno Circuit (2024)
- (Spain) Circuit de Barcelona-Catalunya (2018–2023, 2025–present)
- (France) Circuit de Pau-Ville (2023)
- (Belgium) Circuit de Spa-Francorchamps (2018–present)
- (France) Circuit Paul Ricard (2018, 2020–2023, 2026)
- (Spain) Circuito de Jerez (2016)
- (Spain) Circuito del Jarama (2020)
- (Spain) Circuit Ricardo Tormo (2024)
- (Netherlands) Circuit Zandvoort (2016, 2021)
- (Belgium) Circuit Zolder (2016, 2020, 2024)
- (United Kingdom) Donington Park (2027)
- (Germany) Hockenheimring (2016, 2019, 2025)
- (Hungary) Hungaroring (2018–2019, 2023, 2026)
- (Italy) Misano World Circuit (2016, 2025)
- (Italy) Monza Circuit (2018–2023, 2026)
- (Germany) Motorsport Arena Oschersleben (2019)
- (Italy) Mugello Circuit (2026)
- (Germany) Norisring (2022)
- (Germany) Nürburgring (2016, 2021–2022, 2027)
- (Austria) Red Bull Ring (2019, 2025, 2027)
- (Austria) Salzburgring (2024)
- Slovakia Ring (2021)
- (Russia) Smolensk Ring (2016)
- (Netherlands) TT Circuit Assen (2018)
- (Italy) Vallelunga Circuit (2024)

== Champions ==
Year	Champion (Car)		2nd (Car)		3rd (Car)		Team Champions (Car)	
2016	(Belgium) Pierre-Yves Corthals	Opel Astra	(Belgium) Frédéric Caprasse	Opel Astra	(Finland) Antti Buri	Audi RS 3 LMS		
2017	(France) Aurélien Comte	Peugeot 308	(Italy) Giacomo Altoè	VW Golf GTI	(United Kingdom) Josh Files	Honda Civic	(Italy) Target Competition	Honda Civic
2018	(Spain) Mikel Azcona	SEAT Leon	(France) Jean-Karl Vernay	Audi RS 3 LMS	(Serbia) Dušan Borković	Hyundai i30 N	(Hong Kong) Hell Energy Racing with KCMG	Honda Civic Type R
2019	(United Kingdom) Josh Files	Hyundai i30 N	(France) Julien Briché	Peugeot 308	(Uruguay) Santiago Urrutia	Audi RS 3 LMS	(Italy) Target Competition	Hyundai i30 N
2020	(Morocco) Mehdi Bennani	Audi RS 3 LMS	(France) John Filippi	Hyundai i30 N	(Belgium) Nicolas Baert	Audi RS 3 LMS	(Belgium) Comtoyou Racing	Audi RS 3 LMS
2021	(Spain) Mikel Azcona	CUPRA León Competición	(Argentina) Franco Girolami	Honda Civic Type R	(Netherlands) Tom Coronel	Audi RS 3 LMS	(France) Sébastien Loeb Racing	Hyundai Elantra
2022	(Argentina) Franco Girolami	Audi RS 3 LMS	(Netherlands) Tom Coronel	Audi RS 3 LMS	(United Kingdom) Josh Files	Hyundai Elantra	(Belgium) Comtoyou Racing	Audi RS 3 LMS
2023	(Netherlands) Tom Coronel	Audi RS 3 LMS	(France) John Filippi	Audi RS 3 LMS	(Belgium) Kobe Pauwels	Audi RS 3 LMS	(Belgium) Comtoyou Racing	Audi RS 3 LMS
2024	(Argentina) Franco Girolami	CUPRA León VZ	(France) Aurélien Comte	CUPRA León VZ	(Argentina) Ignacio Montenegro	Honda Civic Type R	(Estonia) ALM Motorsport	Honda Civic Type R
2025	(United Kingdom) Jenson Brickley	CUPRA León VZ	(France) Teddy Clairet	Audi RS 3 LMS	(France) Jimmy Clairet	Audi RS 3 LMS	(Spain) Monlau Motorsport	CUPRA León VZ
2026	(Italy) Marco Butti	CUPRA León VZ	(Germany) Mike Halder	Honda Civic Type R	(Canada) Nicolas Taylor	Audi RS 3 LMS	(Estonia) ALM Motorsport	Honda Civic Type R

== TCR Europe Cup ==
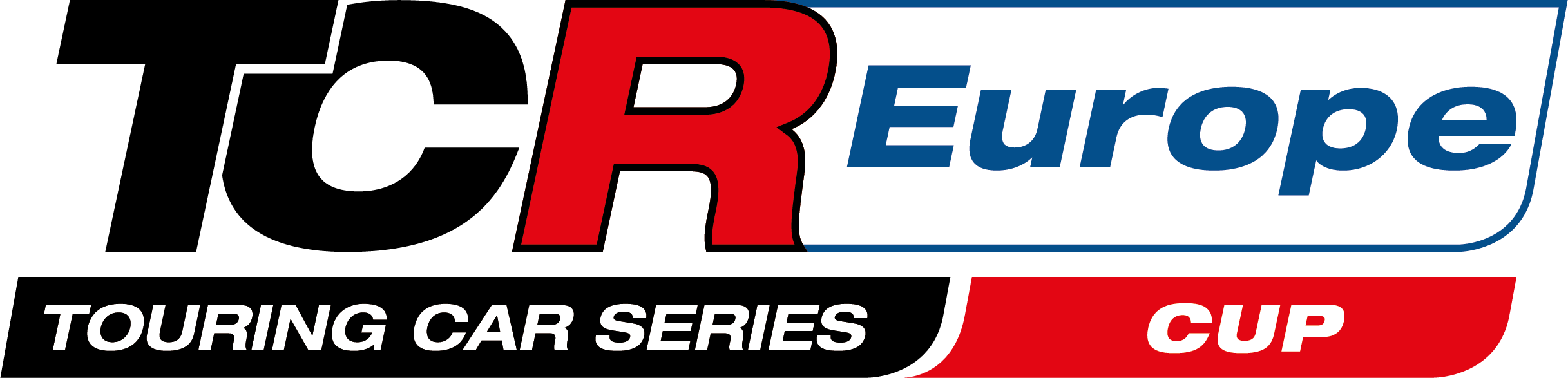
The Logo for the TCR Europe Cup

The TCR Europe Cup was announced on 30 November 2025 as a new, compact touring car series for the 2026 season.

A key element of the format is that two drivers share a single car, consisting of an amateur or semi-professional driver paired with an experienced professional. A "professional" driver is defined as any driver who ranked within the top 50 of the Kumho TCR World Ranking in 2024 or 2025, finished within the top five of the TCR Europe Touring Car Series drivers' standings, or has won a national TCR drivers' title.

In addition to its reduced calendar and lower costs, the TCR Europe Cup also serves as a stepping stone to the main series. The champions — both the professional and amateur drivers — receive a 50% discount on the entry fee for the following season of the TCR Europe Touring Car Series.

Santiago Concepción was the first champion after winning the first race. The second race of the 2026 season was cancelled for unspecified reasons, and it is unknown if a 2027 season will be held.
