= 2026 TCR South America Touring Car Championship =

Motor racing competition

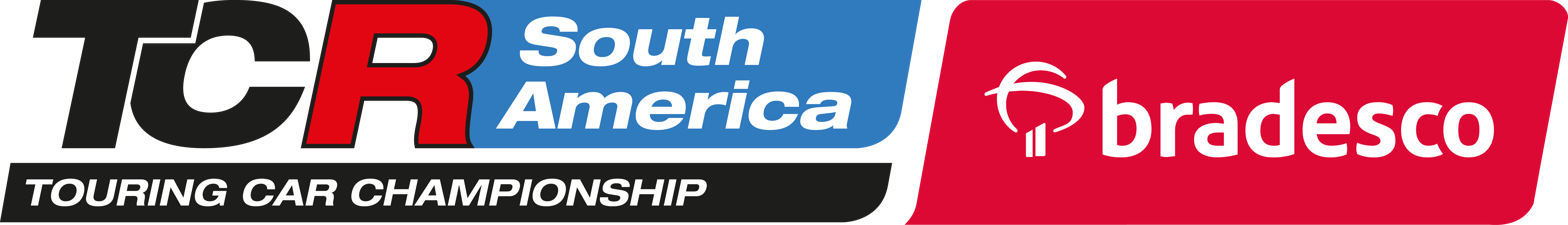
Official Logo

The 2026 Bradesco TCR South America Touring Car Championship is the fifth season of TCR South America Touring Car Championship.

== Teams and drivers ==
Team	Car	No.	Drivers	Class	Rounds	Ref.	Co-Driver name	Rounds	Ref.
(Japan) Honda Racing (Note: Both Honda Racing and Honda YPF Racing are operated by Squadra Martino.)	Honda Civic Type R TCR (FL5)	1	(Argentina) Leonel Pernía	B	1–9		(Argentina) Julián Santero	3	
(Japan) Honda Racing	Honda Civic Type R TCR (FL5)	33	(Brazil) Nelson Piquet Jr.	B	1–7, 9		(Brazil) Marcos Regadas	3	
(Japan) Honda Racing	Honda Civic Type R TCR (FL5)	83	(Argentina) Carlos Okulovich		8		—N/a		—N/a
(Argentina) Honda YPF Racing	Honda Civic Type R TCR (FL5)	85	(Argentina) Tiago Pernía	B	1–9		(Argentina) Esteban Guerrieri	3	
(Argentina) Honda YPF Racing	Honda Civic Type R TCR (FL5)	88	(Argentina) Adrián Chiriano	B T	2–9		(Brazil) Fabio Casagrande	3	
(Argentina) Honda YPF Racing	Honda Civic Type R TCR (FK8)	88	(Argentina) Adrián Chiriano	B T	1		(Brazil) Fabio Casagrande	3	
(Argentina) Honda YPF Racing	Honda Civic Type R TCR (FK8)	61	(Brazil) Fernando Croce	B T	1		—N/a		—N/a
(Argentina) Paladini Racing	Lynk & Co 03 TCR	3	(Argentina) Nicolás Fuca	B J	1–9		(Uruguay) Santiago Urrutia	3	
(Argentina) Paladini Racing	Lynk & Co 03 TCR	5	(Argentina) Fabián Yannantuoni		1–9		(Brazil) Beto Monteiro	3	
(Argentina) Paladini Racing	Lynk & Co 03 TCR	9	(Argentina) Fabricio Pezzini	B	1–9		(Argentina) Carlos Javier Merlo	3	
(Argentina) Paladini Racing	Lynk & Co 03 TCR	16	(Argentina) Juan Ángel Rosso		1–9		(Argentina) Francisco Viel Bugliotti	3	
(Brazil) W2 ProGP	Cupra León VZ TCR	7	(Brazil) Erick Schotten	B J	1–5		(Brazil) Bruno Massa	3	
(Brazil) W2 ProGP	Cupra León VZ TCR	22	(Brazil) Celso Neto	B	1		—N/a		—N/a
(Brazil) W2 ProGP	Cupra León VZ TCR	77	(Brazil) Raphael Reis	B	1–9		(Brazil) Felipe Fraga	3	
Uruguay Racing Team	Hyundai Elantra N TCR (2024)	8	(Uruguay) Joaquín Cafaro	J	6–9		—N/a		—N/a
Uruguay Racing Team	Peugeot 308 TCR	8	(Uruguay) Joaquín Cafaro	J	1–5		(Uruguay) Mauricio Lambiris	3	
Uruguay Racing Team	Peugeot 308 TCR	60	(Uruguay) Juan Manuel Casella	B	1–9		(Brazil) Galid Osman	3	
Uruguay Racing Team	Peugeot 308 TCR	15	(Uruguay) Enrique Maglione	B T	1–6		(Uruguay) Facundo Ferra	3	
Uruguay Racing Team	Audi RS 3 LMS TCR (2021)	15	(Uruguay) Enrique Maglione	B T	7–9		—N/a		—N/a
(Uruguay) Scuderia URT	Peugeot 308 TCR	11	(Argentina) Sebastián Quirno	T	7–9		—N/a		—N/a
(Uruguay) Scuderia URT	Peugeot 308 TCR	13	(Argentina) Javier Jacobson	T	9		—N/a		—N/a
(Uruguay) Scuderia URT	Peugeot 308 TCR	51	(Chile) Nicolás Ambiado	J	7		—N/a		—N/a
(Uruguay) Scuderia URT	Peugeot 308 TCR	81	(Argentina) Lucas Carabajal		9		—N/a		—N/a
(Brazil) G Racing Motorsport	Cupra León VZ TCR	19	(Brazil) Enzo Gianfratti	B	1–9		(United Kingdom) Jenson Brickley	3	
(Brazil) G Racing Motorsport	Cupra León VZ TCR	20	(Brazil) Bruno Massa	B J	1–9		—N/a		—N/a
(Brazil) G Racing Motorsport	Cupra León VZ TCR	43	(Brazil) Pedro Cardoso	B	1–5		(Brazil) Celso Neto	3	
(South Korea) Hyundai N MSA	Hyundai Elantra N TCR (2024)	27	(Argentina) Camilo Trappa	J	1–9		(United Kingdom) Alex Ley	3	
(South Korea) Hyundai N MSA	Hyundai Elantra N TCR (2024)	29	(Argentina) Néstor Girolami		1–9		(Brazil) Gaetano di Mauro	3	
(South Korea) Hyundai N MSA	Hyundai Elantra N TCR (2024)	56	(Brazil) Gabryel Romano	B J	3–9		(Brazil) Alberto Cattucci	3	
(South Korea) Hyundai N MSA	Hyundai Elantra N TCR (2024)	115	(Argentina) Diego Ciantini		1–3		(Argentina) Rodrigo Lugón	3	
(Brazil) Cobra Racing Team	Audi RS 3 LMS TCR (2021)	55	(Argentina) Mariano Pernía	B	3		(Brazil) Alex Seid	3	
(Brazil) Cobra Racing Team	Audi RS 3 LMS TCR (2021)	81	(Brazil) Guilherme Reischl	B T	2		—N/a		—N/a
(Brazil) Cobra Racing Team	Audi RS 3 LMS TCR (2021)	86	(Brazil) Gabriel Moura	B J	1–9		(Argentina) Gastón Iansa	3	
(Brazil) Cobra Racing Team	Audi RS 3 LMS TCR (2021)	87	(Brazil) Jorge Martelli	B T	4		—N/a		—N/a
(Brazil) Porthack Racing	Honda Civic Type R TCR (FK8)	56	(Brazil) Gabryel Romano	B J	2		—N/a		—N/a
(Brazil) Porthack Racing	Honda Civic Type R TCR (FK8)	99	(Brazil) Enzo Falquete	B J	1		—N/a		—N/a

Icon	Class
B	Eligible for TCR Brazil
J	Eligible for Copa Junior
T	Eligible for Copa Trophy

== Calendar ==
Announced on 5 January 2026, the championship is scheduled be contested of 10 rounds across Brazil, Argentina, and Uruguay. However, the calendar is updated again on 15 January 2026, Autódromo Internacional de Cascavel replaced Autódromo Internacional de Santa Cruz do Sul. The season begins at Circuito dos Cristais in March and will end at Autódromo Víctor Borrat Fabini in early December. On 20 July, it was announced that the round at Autódromo Termas de Río Hondo was replaced with the round at Autódromo Oscar Cabalén at the same date due to the organizational and logistical issues.

Race is an Endurance Event
Race is held together with TCR Brazil

Rnd	Circuit/Location	Dates	Support bill	Map
1	(Brazil) Circuito dos Cristais, Curvelo	6–8 March	Stock Car Pro Series	2026 TCR South America Touring Car Championship is located in South America
2	(Brazil) Autódromo Internacional de Cascavel, Cascavel	27–29 March	Stock Car Pro Series; Turismo Nacional BR	2026 TCR South America Touring Car Championship is located in South America
3	(Brazil) Interlagos Circuit, São Paulo	24–26 April	Stock Car Pro Series; Stock Light; F4 Brazilian Championship	2026 TCR South America Touring Car Championship is located in South America
4	(Brazil) Autódromo Internacional de Mato Grosso, Cuiabá	19–20 June	Stock Car Pro Series; Stock Light; Turismo Nacional BR	2026 TCR South America Touring Car Championship is located in South America
5	(Brazil) Autódromo Velo Città, Mogi Guaçu	24–26 July	Stock Car Pro Series; Stock Light; F4 Brazilian Championship	2026 TCR South America Touring Car Championship is located in South America
6	(Argentina) Autódromo Oscar Cabalén, Alta Gracia	21–23 August	Córdoba Pista; Formula Renault Plus CBA	2026 TCR South America Touring Car Championship is located in South America
7	(Argentina) Autodromo Ciudad de Concordia, Concordia	12–13 September	Fórmula 4 Entrerriana; Standard Potenciado 1300	2026 TCR South America Touring Car Championship is located in South America
8	(Argentina) Autódromo Rosamonte, Posadas	2–4 October	TC 4000 Misionero; Turismo Misionero	2026 TCR South America Touring Car Championship is located in South America
9	(Argentina) Autódromo Municipal Juan Manuel Fangio, Rosario	6–8 November	TBA	2026 TCR South America Touring Car Championship is located in South America
10	(Uruguay) Autódromo Víctor Borrat Fabini, El Pinar	4–6 December	SuperEscarabajo; Superturismo Uruguay; Turismo AUVO	2026 TCR South America Touring Car Championship is located in South America

== Race results ==
Rnd		Circuit	Pole position	Fastest lap	Winning driver	Winning team	Winning Junior driver	Winning Trophy driver
1	SR1	(Brazil) Curvelo	(Argentina) Leonel Pernía	(Argentina) Leonel Pernía	(Argentina) Leonel Pernía	(Japan) Honda Racing	(Argentina) Camilo Trappa	(Argentina) Adrián Chiriano
1	SR2	(Brazil) Curvelo		(Brazil) Raphael Reis	(Argentina) Camilo Trappa	(South Korea) Hyundai N MSA	(Argentina) Camilo Trappa	(Argentina) Adrián Chiriano
2	SR1	(Brazil) Cascavel	(Brazil) Nelson Piquet Jr.	(Argentina) Leonel Pernía	(Brazil) Pedro Cardoso	(Brazil) G Racing Motorsport	(Uruguay) Joaquín Cafaro	(Uruguay) Enrique Maglione
2	SR2	(Brazil) Cascavel		(Brazil) Pedro Cardoso	(Argentina) Leonel Pernía	(Japan) Honda Racing	(Uruguay) Joaquín Cafaro	(Argentina) Adrián Chiriano
3	ER	(Brazil) Interlagos	(Brazil) Raphael Reis (Brazil) Felipe Fraga	(Brazil) Raphael Reis (Brazil) Felipe Fraga	(Brazil) Raphael Reis (Brazil) Felipe Fraga	(Brazil) W2 ProGP	(Argentina) Nicolás Fuca (Uruguay) Santiago Urrutia	(Argentina) Adrián Chiriano (Brazil) Fabio Casagrande
4	SR1	(Brazil) Cuiabá	(Argentina) Néstor Girolami	(Brazil) Nelson Piquet Jr.	(Argentina) Néstor Girolami	(South Korea) Hyundai N MSA	(Argentina) Camilo Trappa	(Brazil) Jorge Martelli
4	SR2	(Brazil) Cuiabá		(Brazil) Erick Schotten	(Brazil) Erick Schotten	(Brazil) W2 ProGP	(Brazil) Erick Schotten	(Argentina) Adrián Chiriano
5	SR1	(Brazil) Velo Città	(Brazil) Nelson Piquet Jr.	(Brazil) Pedro Cardoso	(Argentina) Tiago Pernía	(Argentina) Honda YPF Racing	(Argentina) Camilo Trappa	(Uruguay) Enrique Maglione
5	SR2	(Brazil) Velo Città		(Uruguay) Joaquin Cafaro	(Uruguay) Joaquin Cafaro	Uruguay Racing Team	(Uruguay) Joaquín Cafaro	(Argentina) Adrián Chiriano
6	SR1	(Argentina) Alta Gracia	(Argentina) Néstor Girolami	(Argentina) Camilo Trappa	(Argentina) Néstor Girolami	(South Korea) Hyundai N MSA	(Uruguay) Joaquín Cafaro	(Argentina) Adrián Chiriano
6	SR2	(Argentina) Alta Gracia		(Brazil) Nelson Piquet Jr.	(Brazil) Raphael Reis	(Brazil) W2 ProGP	(Argentina) Camilo Trappa	(Uruguay) Enrique Maglione
7	SR1	(Argentina) Concordia	(Argentina) Leonel Pernía	(Argentina) Camilo Trappa	(Argentina) Tiago Pernía (Note: Camilo Trappa was the first driver to cross the finish line, but received a 5-second penalty for causing an incident. Tiago Pernía, who was the second driver to cross the finish line, thus inherited the win.)	(Argentina) Honda YPF Racing	(Argentina) Camilo Trappa	(Argentina) Adrián Chiriano
7	SR2	(Argentina) Concordia		(Brazil) Raphael Reis	(Brazil) Raphael Reis	(Brazil) W2 ProGP	(Brazil) Gabriel Moura	(Argentina) Sebastián Quirno
8	SR1	(Argentina) Posadas	(Argentina) Néstor Girolami	(Argentina) Néstor Girolami	(Argentina) Néstor Girolami	(South Korea) Hyundai N MSA	(Brazil) Gabryel Romano	(Argentina) Adrián Chiriano
8	SR2	(Argentina) Posadas		(Argentina) Néstor Girolami	(Argentina) Néstor Girolami	(South Korea) Hyundai N MSA	(Argentina) Camilo Trappa	(Argentina) Adrián Chiriano
9	SR1	(Argentina) Rosario	(Argentina) Néstor Girolami	(Argentina) Néstor Girolami	(Argentina) Néstor Girolami	(South Korea) Hyundai N MSA	(Argentina) Camilo Trappa	(Argentina) Adrián Chiriano
9	SR2	(Argentina) Rosario		(Argentina) Leonel Pernía	(Argentina) Leonel Pernía	(Japan) Honda Racing	(Argentina) Nicolás Fuca	(Argentina) Adrián Chiriano
10	SR1	(Uruguay) El Pinar						
10	SR2	(Uruguay) El Pinar						
Source: Official TCR South America website

== Championship standings ==
=== Scoring system ===
Qualifying points

Points were awarded to the top seven fastest drivers in qualifying as follows:

Position	1st	2nd	3rd	4th	5th	6th	7th
Points	10	7	5	4	3	2	1

Race points

Points were awarded to the top fifteen classified finishers in all races. The endurance race is 60 minutes long, sprint race 1 is 25 minutes long with grid positions set by qualifying, and sprint race 2 is 30 minutes long with its grid formed with the top ten from the qualifying order reversed.

Position	1st	2nd	3rd	4th	5th	6th	7th	8th	9th	10th	11th	12th	13th	14th	15th
ER	50	44	38	34	30	26	22	19	16	14	11	9	6	4	2
SR1	40	35	30	27	24	21	18	15	13	11	9	7	5	3	1
SR2	35	30	27	24	21	18	15	13	11	9	7	5	3	2	1

=== Drivers' championship ===
Pos	Driver	CRV (Brazil)		CAS (Brazil)		INT (Brazil)	CUI (Brazil)		VEL (Brazil)		AGC (Argentina)		CON (Argentina)		POS (Argentina)		ROS (Argentina)		ELP (Uruguay)		Pts
Pos	Driver	SR1	SR2	SR1	SR2	ER	SR1	SR2	SR1	SR2	SR1	SR2	SR1	SR2	SR1	SR2	SR1	SR2	SR1	SR2	Pts
1	(Argentina) Leonel Pernía	1^{1}	(15)	14^{3}	1	2^{2}	2^{5}	4	3^{4}	4	3^{4}	4	2^{1}	2	2^{6}	Ret	2^{3}	1			509
2	(Argentina) Néstor Girolami	2^{2}	8	4^{7}	8	16†^{4}	1^{1}	Ret	8	10	1^{1}	3	7^{6}	5	1^{1}	1	1^{1}	Ret			427
3	(Brazil) Raphael Reis	4^{3}	6	16^{4}	4	1^{1}	6^{2}	3	4^{2}	Ret	16^{5}	1	3	1	3^{2}	12†	Ret	7			387
4	(Argentina) Tiago Pernía	12^{4}	10	15^{2}	19†	6^{6}	3^{4}	12	1^{3}	7	4^{7}	11	1^{3}	6	5	3	3^{4}	Ret			338
5	(Argentina) Juan Ángel Rosso	3^{7}	3	12	16	10	7	2	7^{7}	5	7	2	4^{4}	7	12	Ret	5^{7}	5			314
6	(Argentina) Camilo Trappa	7	1	8	3	8	4^{7}	Ret	9	6	15^{3}	6	6^{2}	Ret	16^{5}	4	7^{6}	DSQ			272
7	(Uruguay) Joaquín Cafaro	Ret^{6}	7	2^{6}	2	Ret	9	7	10	1	2^{2}	7	8^{5}	12	Ret^{4}	DSQ	Ret^{2}	Ret			249
8	(Brazil) Enzo Gianfratti	17	9	3	15	3^{3}	10	6	11	11	9	5	Ret	13	4	6	14	4			239
9	(Brazil) Nelson Piquet Jr.	14^{5}	2	DNS^{1}	DNS	17†	8^{3}	5	5^{1}	8	5^{6}	15	5^{7}	3			6^{5}	Ret			237
10	(Argentina) Fabricio Pezzini	8	Ret	11	10	7	12	DSQ	6	3	14	Ret	10	8	6	5	8	2			224
11	(Brazil) Pedro Cardoso	5	Ret	1^{5}	14	5^{7}	5^{6}	Ret	2^{5}	2											194
12	(Argentina) Fabián Yannantuoni	Ret	Ret	9	6	11	18	Ret	14	9	12	13	11	4	13	2	4	11			168
13	(Argentina) Nicolás Fuca	13	12	18†	17	4^{5}	11	8	Ret	17	6	10	Ret	Ret	9	8	12	3			159
14	(Uruguay) Juan Manuel Casella	10	11	10	7	15†	14	16†	12	12	8	9	9	11	Ret^{7}	DNS	13	Ret			113
15	(Brazil) Gabriel Moura	19†	5	7	11	DSQ	Ret	14	13	16	Ret	8	Ret	9	Ret	9	Ret	8			101
16	(Argentina) Adrián Chiriano	11	16	19	9	14	17	11	18	14	11	Ret	12	15	10	10	11	9			88
17	(Brazil) Erick Schotten	16	14	5	13	12	13	1	Ret^{6}	DNS											80
18	(Brazil) Celso Neto	6	4			5^{7}															76
19	(Brazil) Bruno Massa	20	13	DNS	DNS	12	19	9	15	13	17	16†	15	10	8	Ret	15	6			71
20	(Brazil) Gabryel Romano			17	18	13	16	14	16	15	10	12	Ret	Ret	7^{3}	Ret	10	Ret			66
21	(Brazil) Felipe Fraga					1^{1}															60
22	(Argentina) Diego Ciantini	9	17	6	5	Ret															55
23	(Argentina) Julián Santero					2^{2}															51
24	(United Kingdom) Jenson Brickley					3^{3}															43
25	(Uruguay) Santiago Urrutia					4^{5}															37
26	(Uruguay) Enrique Maglione	Ret	Ret	13	12	Ret	20	15	17	18	13	14	13	16	14	Ret	16	12			31
27	(Argentina) Esteban Guerrieri					6^{6}															28
28	(Argentina) Carlos Okulovich														11	7					24
29	(Argentina) Carlos Javier Merlo					7															22
30	(United Kingdom) Alex Ley					8															19
31	(Argentina) Mariano Pernía					9															16
32	(Brazil) Alex Seid					9															16
33	(Argentina) Francisco Viel Bugliotti					10															14
34	(Argentina) Lucas Carabajal																9	Ret			13
35	(Brazil) Beto Monteiro					11															11
36	(Argentina) Sebastián Quirno												Ret	14	15	11	Ret	Ret			10
37	(Argentina) Javier Jacobson																Ret	10			9
38	(Brazil) Alberto Cattucci					13															6
39	(Brazil) Jorge Martelli						15	13													4
40	(Brazil) Fabio Casagrande					14															4
41	(Brazil) Gaetano di Mauro					16†^{4}															4
42	(Chile) Nicolás Ambiado												14	Ret							3
43	(Brazil) Galid Osman					15†															2
44	(Brazil) Fernando Croce	15	18																		1
45	(Brazil) Marcos Regadas					17†															0
46	(Brazil) Enzo Falquete	18†	19																		0
—	(Argentina) Rodrigo Lugón					Ret															0
—	(Uruguay) Mauricio Lambiris					Ret															0
—	(Uruguay) Facundo Ferra					Ret															0
—	(Brazil) Guilherme Reischl			DNS	DNS																0
—	(Argentina) Gastón Iansa					DSQ															0
Pos	Driver	CRV (Brazil)		CAS (Brazil)		INT (Brazil)	CUI (Brazil)		VEL (Brazil)		AGC (Argentina)		CON (Argentina)		POS (Argentina)		ROS (Argentina)		ELP (Uruguay)		Pts
Sources:, the official TCR South America website

Colour	Result
Gold	Winner
Silver	Second place
Bronze	Third place
Green	Points classification
Blue	Non-points classification
Blue	Non-classified finish (NC)
Purple	Retired, not classified (Ret)
Red	Did not qualify (DNQ)
Red	Did not pre-qualify (DNPQ)
Black	Disqualified (DSQ)
White	Did not start (DNS)
White	Withdrew (WD)
White	Race cancelled (C)
Blank	Did not practice (DNP)
Blank	Did not arrive (DNA)
Blank	Excluded (EX)

^{1-7} – Points-scoring position in qualifying.

† – Drivers did not finish the race, but were classified as they completed over 75% of the race distance.
