= 2023 TCR UK Touring Car Championship =

Motor racing competition

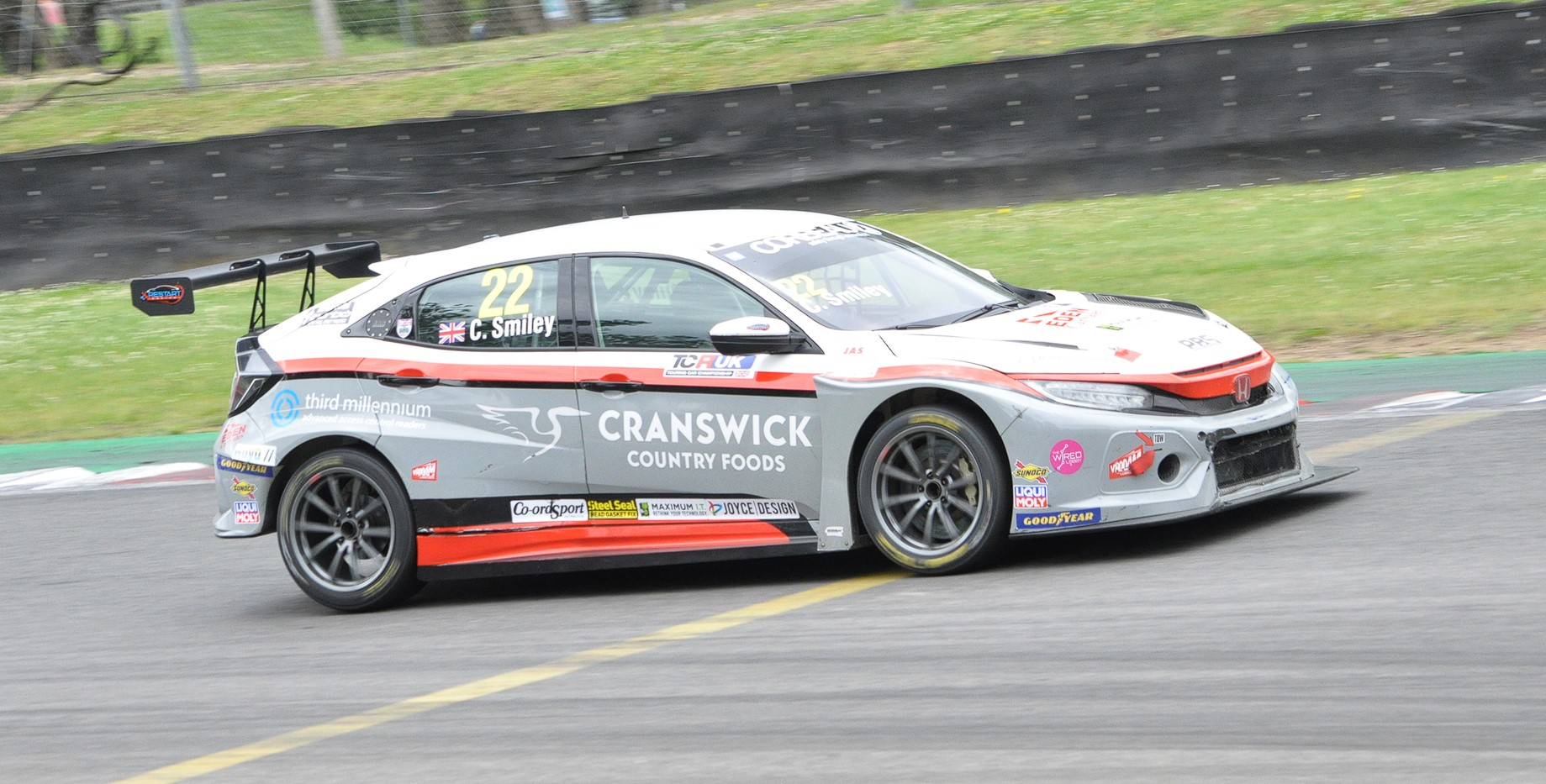
Chris Smiley enters the season as the reigning Drivers' Champion.

The 2023 TCR UK Touring Car Championship is the sixth season of the TCR UK Touring Car Championship. The championship features production-based touring cars built to TCR specifications and will be held over fifteen races across seven meetings throughout England and Scotland. The championship is operated by Stewart Lines' Maximum Group in partnership with the British Racing and Sports Car Club.

== Calendar ==
The schedule for 2023 was announced on 10 October 2022 containing 15 races across 7 rounds. Snetterton would host the season opener and move onto the 300 circuit. Both Knockhill and Croft would return for the first time since 2018 and 2019 respectively. The championship would makes its first appearance on the traditional clockwise layout at Knockhill. The series would also return to Silverstone's National layout for the first time since the 2020 season. Both Donington Park and Oulton Park would slim down to a single meeting in 2023 while Castle Combe was left off the schedule altogether. It was also announced through social media that a media day would take place at Donington Park on the 29th March.

Rnd.		Circuit/Location	Date
1	1	Snetterton Circuit (300 Circuit), Norfolk)	8–9 April
1	2	Snetterton Circuit (300 Circuit), Norfolk)	8–9 April
2	3	Croft Circuit, North Yorkshire	6–7 May
2	4	Croft Circuit, North Yorkshire	6–7 May
3	5	Oulton Park (Island), Cheshire	10 June
3	6	Oulton Park (Island), Cheshire	10 June
4	7	Knockhill Racing Circuit, Fife	22–23 July
4	8	Knockhill Racing Circuit, Fife	22–23 July
4	9	Knockhill Racing Circuit, Fife	22–23 July
5	10	Silverstone Circuit (National), Northamptonshire	19–20 August
5	11	Silverstone Circuit (National), Northamptonshire	19–20 August
6	12	Donington Park (National), Leicestershire	9–10 September
6	13	Donington Park (National), Leicestershire	9–10 September
7	14	Brands Hatch (Indy), Kent	21–22 October
7	15	Brands Hatch (Indy), Kent	21–22 October

== Changes ==
=== Organisational Changes ===
- In October 2022 it was revealed that the championship would be leaving the Time Attack UK package after 2 years to re-join the British Racing and Sports Car Club. As part of a multi-year agreement, TCR UK would appear as the headline event at 7 BRSCC race weekends. Furthermore, the BRSCC Fiesta Junior Championship was announced as an official feeder series to TCR UK and would race at the same events in 2023.
- Former Ginetta Motorsport Manager Ashley Gallagher joined as Championship Manager for both TCR UK and the Milltek Sport Civic Cup.
- A total prize fund of £75,000 was announced by the organisers. At each meeting, cash prizes would be awarded to the pole position winner and the top 3 in each race. Moreover, the top 3 in the championship at seasons end would also receive prizes as well as the overall winners of the Goodyear Diamond Trophy and Tom Walker Memorial Trophy.

=== Technical Changes ===
- Carless Racing Fuels was introduced as the official control fuel supplier to the series. As part of this collaboration, a TCR Driver of the Day initiative was launched, with the winner receiving a 54 litre keg of control fuel.

== Teams and drivers ==
Team	Car	No.	Drivers	Class	Rounds
(United Kingdom) / Area Motorsport (Note: Cars No. 09, No. 21, No. 37 No. 115 and No. 117 entered as Area Motorsport. Car No. 76 entered as Area Motorsport with Daniel James.); (United Kingdom) / Area Motorsport with Daniel James	Hyundai Elantra N TCR	09	(United Kingdom) Josh Files		1
(United Kingdom) / Area Motorsport; (United Kingdom) / Area Motorsport with Daniel James	Hyundai Elantra N TCR	115	(United Kingdom) Luke Sargeant		3, 5–7
(United Kingdom) / Area Motorsport; (United Kingdom) / Area Motorsport with Daniel James	Hyundai i30 N TCR	21	(United Kingdom) Andy Wilmot	D	2
(United Kingdom) / Area Motorsport; (United Kingdom) / Area Motorsport with Daniel James	Hyundai i30 N TCR	37	(United Kingdom) Bruce Winfield		All
(United Kingdom) / Area Motorsport; (United Kingdom) / Area Motorsport with Daniel James	Hyundai i30 N TCR	76	(United Kingdom) Alex Ley		All
(United Kingdom) / Area Motorsport; (United Kingdom) / Area Motorsport with Daniel James	Hyundai i30 N TCR	117	(United Kingdom) Adam Shepherd		All
(United Kingdom) Restart Racing	Honda Civic Type R TCR (FL5)	1	(United Kingdom) Chris Smiley		All
(United Kingdom) Restart Racing	Honda Civic Type R TCR (FK8)	27	(United Kingdom) Scott Sumpton		All
(United Kingdom) Essex & Kent Motorsport	Hyundai Veloster N TCR	4	(United Kingdom) Bradley Kent		1–6
(United Kingdom) Rob Boston Racing	Audi RS 3 LMS TCR (2021)	11	(United Kingdom) Jac Constable		All
(United Kingdom) Rob Boston Racing	Audi RS 3 LMS TCR (2021)	99	(United Kingdom) Joe Marshall-Birks		All
(United Kingdom) Rob Boston Racing	Cupra León Competición TCR	21	(United Kingdom) Andy Wilmot	D	5, 7
(United Kingdom) Zest Racecar Engineering	Cupra León Competición TCR	14	(United Kingdom) Dan Kirby		1–2
(United Kingdom) Zest Racecar Engineering	Cupra León Competición TCR	41	(United Kingdom) Carl Boardley	D	1
(United Kingdom) JH Racing	Hyundai i30 N TCR	16	(United Kingdom) Callum Newsham		All
(United Kingdom) bond-It with MPHR	Cupra León Competición TCR	17	(United Kingdom) Bradley Hutchison		6–7
(United Kingdom) bond-It with MPHR	Audi RS 3 LMS TCR (2017)	17	(United Kingdom) Bradley Hutchison		1–5
(United Kingdom) MPHR	Audi RS 3 LMS TCR (2017)	35	(United Kingdom) Steve Gales	D	1–2
(United Kingdom) MPHR	Cupra León Competición TCR	35	(United Kingdom) Steve Gales		3
(United Kingdom) Matrix Motorsport with DW Racing	Opel Astra TCR	19	(United Kingdom) Jeff Alden		5–7
(United Kingdom) DW Racing	Vauxhall Astra TCR	50	(United Kingdom) Darelle Wilson		All
(United Kingdom) JW Bird Motorsport	Audi RS 3 LMS TCR (2017)	28	(United Kingdom) George Jaxon		7
(United Kingdom) JW Bird Motorsport	Cupra León Competición TCR	28	(United Kingdom) George Jaxon		1
(United Kingdom) JW Bird Motorsport	Cupra León Competición TCR	31	(United Kingdom) Matthew Wilson		All
(United Kingdom) Chameleon Motorsport	Cupra León Competición TCR	39	(United Kingdom) Lewis Brown		1
(United Kingdom) CBM with Hart GT	Cupra León Competición TCR	41	(United Kingdom) Carl Boardley	D	2–7
(United Kingdom) Pro Alloys Racing	Hyundai i30 N TCR	45	(United Kingdom) Alistair Camp		1, 6
(United Kingdom) Team AFM Racing	Cupra León TCR	72	(United Kingdom) Rick Kerry	D	1, 3, 5–7
(United Kingdom) Richmond Fire Motorsport	Cupra León TCR	77	(United Kingdom) Mark Smith		6–7
(United Kingdom) Paul Sheard Racing	Volkswagen Golf GTI TCR	78	(United Kingdom) Jonathon Beeson		3
(United Kingdom) Paul Sheard Racing	Audi RS 3 LMS TCR (2021)	78	(United Kingdom) Jonathon Beeson		4
(United Kingdom) Paul Sheard Racing	Audi RS 3 LMS TCR (2021)	87	(United Kingdom) George Heler		3
(United Kingdom) Paul Sheard Racing	Audi RS 3 LMS TCR (2021)	98	(China) Oliver Cottam (Note: Cottam is a British-Chinese driver competing under a Chinese license.)		All
(United Kingdom) Paul Sheard Racing	Audi RS 3 LMS TCR (2021)	223	(United Kingdom) Gary Townsend		1
(United Kingdom) Townsend Motorsport	Audi RS 3 LMS TCR (2021)	223	(United Kingdom) Gary Townsend		2–7
(United Kingdom) Jenson Brickley Racing	Cupra León Competición TCR	246	(United Kingdom) Jenson Brickley		All
(United Kingdom) Darron Lewis Racing	Audi RS 3 LMS TCR (2017)	285	(United Kingdom) Darron Lewis	D	1–3, 5

Icon	Class
D	Eligible for Goodyear Diamond Trophy

=== Driver Changes ===
Entering/Re-Entering TCR UK

- Both Gary Townsend and Joe Marshall-Birks will move from the Ginetta GT4 Supercup to join Paul Sheard Racing. They will also be joined by Ginetta GT5 Challenge racer Oliver Cottam.
- After an appearance in the previous seasons finale, George Jaxon will join the championship full time, driving a Cupra León Competición TCR for JW Bird Motorsport.
- Jenson Brickley joined the series driving a family run Cupra León Competición TCR.
- Lewis Brown moved from the Mini Challenge UK to join Chameleon Motorsport.
- Darron Lewis returned full time, having made a one-off appearance towards the end of the previous season.
- Former Kumho BMW Championship champion Rick Kerry announced a partial season campaign at the wheel of a Cupra León TCR.
- Luke Sargeant joined Area Motorsport for a partial season campaign driving a Hyundai i30 N TCR.
- Former BTCC driver Carl Boardley joined the series driving a Cupra León Competición TCR for Zest Racecar Engineering.
- Dan Kirby returned the series after having last raced in 2021 for Power Maxed Racing, driving a second car for Zest Racecar Engineering.

Changed Teams

- Scott Sumpton moved from Essex & Kent Motorsport to join defending champion Chris Smiley at Restart Racing in a second Honda Civic Type R TCR (FK8).
- George Jaxon moved from Team HARD. with GO FIX to join JW Bird Motorsport.
- Alex Ley and Daniel James Motorsport joined forces with Area Motorsport.
- Having joined MPHR part way through the previous season, Steve Gales will commit to a full season alongside Brad Hutchinson in his first generation Audi RS 3 LMS TCR.
- Callum Newsham joined newcomers JH Racing and would drive a Hyundai i30 N TCR.
- Jac Constable moved from Power Maxed Racing to join Rob Boston Racing.

=== Team changes ===
- Paul Sheard Racing will switch from running a Volkswagen Golf GTI TCR to the latest Gen II Audi RS 3 LMS TCR.
- Area Motorsport will enter a Hyundai Elantra N TCR for Jamie Tonks. This would be the first time this model would appear in the UK series. Bruce Winfield will also switch to Hyundai machinery ahead of the 2023 season.
- Chameleon Motorsport expanded and upgraded to the latest generation Cupra León Competición TCR.
- Daniel James Motorsport would collaborate with Area Motorsport and would run Alex Ley under the Area Motorsport with Daniel James banner.
- Restart Racing will enter an all new Honda Civic Type R TCR (FL5) for reigning champion Chris Smiley.

== Race calendar and results ==
Round	Circuit	Pole position	Fastest lap	Winning driver	Winning team	Diamond Trophy winner
1	Snetterton Circuit	(United Kingdom) Josh Files	(United Kingdom) Josh Files	(United Kingdom) Bruce Winfield	(United Kingdom) Area Motorsport	(United Kingdom) Carl Boardley
1	Snetterton Circuit		(United Kingdom) Lewis Brown	(United Kingdom) Lewis Brown	(United Kingdom) Chameleon Motorsport	(United Kingdom) Carl Boardley
2	Croft Circuit	(United Kingdom) Jac Constable	(United Kingdom) Jac Constable	(United Kingdom) Jac Constable	(United Kingdom) Rob Boston Racing	(United Kingdom) Carl Boardley
2	Croft Circuit		(United Kingdom) Jenson Brickley	(United Kingdom) Jenson Brickley	(United Kingdom) Jenson Brickley Racing	(United Kingdom) Carl Boardley
3	Oulton Park Island	(United Kingdom) Bruce Winfield	(United Kingdom) Bruce Winfield	(United Kingdom) Bruce Winfield	(United Kingdom) Area Motorsport	(United Kingdom) Carl Boardley
3	Oulton Park Island		(United Kingdom) Bruce Winfield	(United Kingdom) Carl Boardley	(United Kingdom) CBM with Hart GT	(United Kingdom) Carl Boardley
4	Knockhill Racing Circuit	(United Kingdom) Carl Boardley	(United Kingdom) Jenson Brickley	(United Kingdom) Carl Boardley	(United Kingdom) CBM with Hart GT	(United Kingdom) Carl Boardley
4	Knockhill Racing Circuit		(United Kingdom) Jenson Brickley	(United Kingdom) Alex Ley	(United Kingdom) Area Motorsport with Daniel James	(United Kingdom) Carl Boardley
4	Knockhill Racing Circuit		(United Kingdom) Joe Marshall-Birks	(United Kingdom) Carl Boardley	(United Kingdom) CBM with Hart GT	(United Kingdom) Carl Boardley
5	Silverstone Circuit National	(United Kingdom) Adam Shepherd	(United Kingdom) Scott Sumpton	(United Kingdom) Carl Boardley	(United Kingdom) CBM with Hart GT	(United Kingdom) Carl Boardley
5	Silverstone Circuit National		(United Kingdom) Bradley Kent	(United Kingdom) Alex Ley	(United Kingdom) Area Motorsport with Daniel James	(United Kingdom) Andy Wilmot
6	Donington Park National	(United Kingdom) Jenson Brickley	(United Kingdom) Jenson Brickley	(United Kingdom) Adam Shepherd	(United Kingdom) Area Motorsport	(United Kingdom) Carl Boardley
6	Donington Park National		(United Kingdom) Bruce Winfield	(United Kingdom) Alistair Camp	(United Kingdom) Pro Alloys Racing	(United Kingdom) Carl Boardley
7	Brands Hatch Indy	(United Kingdom) Jenson Brickley	(United Kingdom) Jenson Brickley	(United Kingdom) Alex Ley	(United Kingdom) Area Motorsport with Daniel James	(United Kingdom) Carl Boardley
7	Brands Hatch Indy		(United Kingdom) Callum Newsham	(United Kingdom) Jac Constable	(United Kingdom) Rob Boston Racing	(United Kingdom) Carl Boardley

== Championship standings ==
=== Drivers' standings ===
Points system
Position	**1st**	**2nd**	**3rd**	**4th**	**5th**	**6th**	**7th**	**8th**	**9th**	**10th**	**11th**	**12th**	**13th**	**14th**	**15th**	Fastest lap
Qualifying	6	5	4	3	2	1	—N/a									
Race	40	35	30	27	24	21	18	15	13	11	9	7	5	3	1	1

- Drivers' top 13 results from the 15 races count towards the championship.

Pos	Driver	SNE		CRO		OUL		KNO			SIL		DON		BHI		Total	Drop	Points
1	(United Kingdom) Carl Boardley	6	5	2^{2}	5	10	1	**1**^{1}	4	**1**^{1}	1^{4}	7	4	10	4^{5}	5	425	22	403
2	(United Kingdom) Alex Ley	5^{5}	2	10	Ret	3^{2}	Ret	6^{4}	1	6	11	1	6	3	1^{3}	3	366	15	351
3	(United Kingdom) Jenson Brickley	8	8	8	1^{F}	8	4	5^{6F}	2^{F}	2^{2}	2	8	**2**^{1F}	Ret	**6**^{1F}	2	380	33	347
4	(United Kingdom) Jac Constable	Ret	19	**1**^{1F}	6	2^{3}	8	2^{2}	10	4^{6}	4	11	3^{4}	7	7	1	346	9	337
5	(United Kingdom) Adam Shepherd	16^{3}	6	6	2	5^{5}	5	3^{5}	3	5^{5}	**Ret**^{1}	Ret	1^{2}	2	3	Ret	333	0	333
6	(United Kingdom) Bruce Winfield	1^{2}	3	7	4	**1**^{1F}	6^{F}	4	Ret	7	Ret^{2}	3	5^{3}	8^{F}	8	9	337	15	322
7	(United Kingdom) Joe Marshall-Birks	7	7	5^{6}	3	6	15	7^{3}	6	3^{3F}	3^{6}	12	Ret^{5}	4	5^{6}	Ret	280	1	279
8	(United Kingdom) Brad Hutchison	9	9	9	8	7	3	Ret	7	9	8	4	8	DSQ	10	7	219	22	197
9	(United Kingdom) Callum Newsham	Ret	11	4^{4}	7	Ret	Ret	8	DSQ	15^{4}	7	DNS	12	6	2^{2}	4^{F}	187	12	175
10	(United Kingdom) Chris Smiley	3^{4}	Ret	Ret^{5}	9	4^{4}	7	9	Ret	Ret	6	DNS	7	DSQ	Ret^{4}	DNS	152	0	152
11	(United Kingdom) Matthew Wilson	13	16	14	13	13	10	10	5	12	10	2	11	11	13	DNS	140	3	137
12	(United Kingdom) Scott Sumpton	DSQ	13	Ret	12	DNS	DNS	12	8	11	9^{3F}	9	10	5	Ret	DNS	109	0	109
13	(United Kingdom) Bradley Kent	11	4	3^{3}	Ret	Ret^{6}	9	Ret	Ret	8	Ret	Ret^{F}	Ret^{6}	14			105	0	105
14	(China) Oliver Cottam	Ret	14	12	10	15	Ret	11	11	13	5^{5}	Ret	17	12	9	DNS	91	0	91
15	(United Kingdom) Darelle Wilson	Ret	18	16	DSQ	9	2	Ret	9	Ret	13	5	14	Ret	Ret	13	98	12	86
16	(United Kingdom) Alistair Camp	10	10										9	1			75	0	75
17	(United Kingdom) Lewis Brown	4^{6}	1^{F}														69	0	69
18	(United Kingdom) Andy Wilmot			13	11						16	6			14	6	59	0	59
19	(United Kingdom) Luke Sargeant					14	11				12	10	18	9	11	8	67	9	58
20	(United Kingdom) Josh Files	**2**^{1F}	Ret														42	0	42
21	(United Kingdom) Rick Kerry	Ret	17			12	Ret				14	14	15	15	12	10	33	0	33
22	(United Kingdom) Jonathan Beeson					11	12	Ret	Ret	10							27	0	27
23	(United Kingdom) Garry Townsend	14	20	15	DSQ	Ret	13	13	12	14	Ret	13	13	13	DNS	DNS	39	12	27
24	(United Kingdom) Dan Kirby	12	12	11	16												23	0	23
25	(United Kingdom) George Jaxon	18	21												Ret	11	9	0	9
26	(United Kingdom) Mark Smith												Ret	DNS	Ret	12	7	0	7
27	(United Kingdom) Darron Lewis	15	15	Ret	14	Ret	Ret				Ret	DNS					5	0	5
28	(United Kingdom) Jeff Alden										15	Ret	16	16	15	Ret	2	0	2
29	(United Kingdom) Steve Gales	17	22	17	15	DNS	Ret										1	0	1
30	(United Kingdom) George Heler					Ret	14										3	9	-6
Pos	Driver	SNE		CRO		OUL		KNO			SIL		DON		BHI		Total	Drop	Points

Key
Colour	Result
Gold	Winner
Silver	Second place
Bronze	Third place
Green	Other points position
Blue	Other classified position
Blue	Not classified, finished (NC)
Purple	Not classified, retired (Ret)
Red	Did not qualify (DNQ)
Red	Did not pre-qualify (DNPQ)
Black	Disqualified (DSQ)
White	Did not start (DNS)
White	Race cancelled (C)
Blank	Did not practice (DNP)
Blank	Excluded (EX)
Blank	Did not arrive (DNA)
Blank	Withdrawn (WD)
Blank	Did not enter (cell empty)
Text formatting	Meaning
**Bold**	Pole position
Italics	Fastest lap

^{1 2 3 4 5 6} – Qualifying position
^{F} – Fastest lap
