= TCR Spain Touring Car Championship =

#Spain motorsport event

- Category: Touring cars
- Country: Spain
- Inaugural season: 2021
- Tyre suppliers: Kumho
- Drivers' champion: Mike Halder
- Official website: https://spain.tcr-series.com

The TCR Spain Touring Car Championship is a Spanish touring car racing series held according to the TCR regulations. It was first established in 2021 by the RFEDA to create a national platform for touring car racing in Spain. It is part of the global TCR Series network, originally organized by WSC Group.

In 2023, the organization of the series was taken over by Rivazza and V-Line Org after the RFEDA decided to step back from direct management. The new organizers aim to further develop the series and promote international participation in Spanish motorsport.

== Circuits ==
Number	Circuits	Rounds	Years
1	(Spain) Circuit de Barcelona-Catalunya	6 (Note: Circuit de Barcelona-Catalunya hosted 2 rounds in 2025 season.)	2021–present
2	(Spain) Circuito de Jerez – Ángel Nieto	4	2022–2025
3	(Spain) Circuito de Navarra	3	2021–2023, 2026
3	(Spain) Circuito del Jarama	3	2021–2022, 2024, 2026
3	(Spain) MotorLand Aragón	3	2021–2022, 2025
3	(Spain) Circuit Ricardo Tormo	3	2021, 2024–present
5	(Portugal) Circuito do Estoril	2	2023–2024
6	(France) Circuit Paul Ricard	0	2026

== Champions ==
Year	Driver	Team	Car
2021	(Germany) Mike Halder	(Germany) Halder Motorsport	Honda Civic Type R TCR
2022	(Spain) Isidro Callejas	(Spain) CUPRA Racing	CUPRA León Competición TCR
2023	(Spain) Enric Bordás	(Spain) Monlau Competición	CUPRA León VZ TCR
2024	(Argentina) Ignacio Montenegro	(Spain) MONLAU Motorsport	CUPRA León VZ TCR
2025	(Germany) Mike Halder	(Germany) Halder Motorsport	Honda Civic Type R TCR
