= 2025 TCR Europe Touring Car Series =

European motorsport championship

The 2025 TCR Europe Touring Car Series was the ninth season of TCR Europe Touring Car Series. The season begin at Algarve International Circuit on 26 April and end at Circuit de Barcelona-Catalunya on 27 September.

== Calendar ==
The calendar was announced on 6 December 2024 with 6 rounds scheduled.

Rnd.		Circuit/Location	Date	Supporting
1	1	(Portugal) Algarve International Circuit, Portimão	26–27 April	International GT Open; Euroformula Open Championship; GT Cup Open Europe
1	2	(Portugal) Algarve International Circuit, Portimão	26–27 April	International GT Open; Euroformula Open Championship; GT Cup Open Europe
2	3	(Belgium) Circuit de Spa-Francorchamps, Stavelot	16–17 May	International GT Open; Formula Regional European Championship; Euroformula Open Championship; GT Cup Open Europe
2	4	(Belgium) Circuit de Spa-Francorchamps, Stavelot	16–17 May	International GT Open; Formula Regional European Championship; Euroformula Open Championship; GT Cup Open Europe
3	5	(Germany) Hockenheimring, Hockenheim	6–8 June	International GT Open; Euroformula Open Championship; GT Cup Open Europe
3	6	(Germany) Hockenheimring, Hockenheim	6–8 June	International GT Open; Euroformula Open Championship; GT Cup Open Europe
4	7	(Italy) Misano World Circuit Marco Simoncelli, Misano Adriatico	27–29 June	AvD Sports Car Challenge; Coppa Italia Turismo
4	8	(Italy) Misano World Circuit Marco Simoncelli, Misano Adriatico	27–29 June	AvD Sports Car Challenge; Coppa Italia Turismo
5	9	(Austria) Red Bull Ring, Spielberg	5–7 September	International GT Open; Formula Regional European Championship; Euroformula Open Championship
5	10	(Austria) Red Bull Ring, Spielberg	5–7 September	International GT Open; Formula Regional European Championship; Euroformula Open Championship
6	11	(Spain) Circuit de Barcelona-Catalunya, Montmeló	26–27 September	24H Series
6	12	(Spain) Circuit de Barcelona-Catalunya, Montmeló	26–27 September	24H Series

== Teams and drivers ==
Eleven teams were confirmed to be pre-selected for the 2025 season.

Team	Car	No.	Drivers	Class	Rounds
(Italy) MM Motorsport	Honda Civic Type R TCR (FL5)	3	(Italy) Giacomo Ghermandi	D	1, 5–6
(Italy) MM Motorsport	Honda Civic Type R TCR (FL5)	82	(Italy) Jacopo Cimenes	U	4–6
(Italy) MM Motorsport	Honda Civic Type R TCR (FL5)	111	(Italy) Marco Butti	U	All
(France) JSB Compétition	Hyundai Elantra N TCR (2024)	4	(France) Julien Briché		1–3, 5–6
(France) JSB Compétition	Hyundai Elantra N TCR	6	(France) Jean Laurent Navarro	D	1–3
(France) JSB Compétition	Hyundai Elantra N TCR	98	(France) Pierre Arnaud Navarro	D	1–3
(France) JSB Compétition	Hyundai Elantra N TCR	145	(France) Raphael Fournier	U	5–6
(Italy) Aikoa Racing	Audi RS 3 LMS TCR (2021)	8	(Italy) Nicola Baldan		All
(Italy) Aikoa Racing	Audi RS 3 LMS TCR (2021)	22	(Italy) Giacomo Prandelli		6
(Italy) Aikoa Racing	Audi RS 3 LMS TCR (2021)	80	(Italy) Filippo Barberi	U	All
(Sweden) MA:GP	Lynk & Co 03 TCR	10	(Sweden) Viktor Andersson	U	All
(Italy) BRC Racing Team	Hyundai Elantra N TCR	12	(Italy) Gabriele Covini	U	5–6
(Estonia) ALM Motorsport	Honda Civic Type R TCR (FL5)	13	(Turkey) Vedat Ali Dalokay		4
(Estonia) ALM Motorsport	Honda Civic Type R TCR (FL5)	27	(Estonia) Ruben Volt	U	All
(Estonia) ALM Motorsport	Honda Civic Type R TCR (FL5)	48	(Sweden) Mikael Karlsson	D	3
(Estonia) ALM Motorsport	Honda Civic Type R TCR (FL5)	66	(Canada) Gary Kwok	D	6
(Estonia) ALM Motorsport	Honda Civic Type R TCR (FL5)	79	(Estonia) Sven Karuse	D	2
(Estonia) ALM Motorsport	Honda Civic Type R TCR (FL5)	108	(Germany) René Kircher		5–6
(Estonia) ALM Motorsport	Honda Civic Type R TCR (FL5)	237	(Estonia) Sten Dorian Piirimägi		2
(Italy) PMA Motorsport	Audi RS 3 LMS TCR (2021)	17	(Canada) Nicolas Taylor	U	All
(Italy) PMA Motorsport	Audi RS 3 LMS TCR (2021)	44	(Italy) Felice Jelmini		1–3
(Italy) PMA Motorsport	Audi RS 3 LMS TCR (2021)	72	(Italy) Sandro Pelatti	D	4–6
(Spain) RC2 Racing Team	Honda Civic Type R TCR (FL5)	19	(Spain) Felipe Fernández		All
(Spain) RC2 Racing Team	Honda Civic Type R TCR (FL5)	33	(Spain) Santiago Concepción	U	All
(Spain) RC2 Racing Team	Honda Civic Type R TCR (FL5)	45	(Spain) Victor Fernández	D	All
(France) Team Clairet Sport	Audi RS 3 LMS TCR (2021)	20	(France) Teddy Clairet		All
(France) Team Clairet Sport	Audi RS 3 LMS TCR (2021)	21	(France) Jimmy Clairet		All
(Spain) Monlau Motorsport	Cupra León VZ TCR	28	(Spain) Eric Gené	U	All
(Spain) Monlau Motorsport	Cupra León VZ TCR	246	(United Kingdom) Jenson Brickley	U	All
(Italy) Target Competition	Hyundai Elantra N TCR (2024)	69	(Republic of Ireland) Max Hart		All
(South Korea) Solite Indigo Racing	Hyundai Elantra N TCR (2024)	87	(South Korea) Park Jun-ui	U	All
(South Korea) Solite Indigo Racing	Hyundai Elantra N TCR (2024)	97	(South Korea) Park June-sung		All
(United Kingdom) Area Motorsport	Cupra León VZ TCR	100	(United Kingdom) Steve Laidlaw		6
(United Kingdom) Area Motorsport	Cupra León VZ TCR	101	(United Kingdom) Sam Laidlaw		6
(Spain) GOAT Racing	Audi RS 3 LMS TCR (2021)	286	(Spain) Rubén Fernández	D	5
(Italy) Kombat Motorsport	Hyundai Elantra N TCR	344	(Italy) Michele Imberti		4

Icon	Class
U	Eligible for TCR Europe Under 21 Trophy
D	Eligible for TCR Europe Diamond Trophy
G	Guest drivers ineligible to score points

- Levente Losonczy was scheduled to compete for ALM Motorsport but did not appear in any round.

== Results and standings ==
Rnd.		Circuit/Location	Pole position	Fastest lap	Winning driver	Winning team	Winning Youth driver	Winning Diamond driver
1	1	(Portugal) Algarve International Circuit	(France) Jimmy Clairet	(Spain) Eric Gené	(France) Jimmy Clairet	(France) Team Clairet Sport	(United Kingdom) Jenson Brickley	(Spain) Felipe Fernández
1	2	(Portugal) Algarve International Circuit		(United Kingdom) Jenson Brickley	(United Kingdom) Jenson Brickley	(Spain) Monlau Motorsport	(United Kingdom) Jenson Brickley	(Spain) Felipe Fernández
2	3	(Belgium) Circuit de Spa-Francorchamps	(Spain) Felipe Fernández	(Italy) Marco Butti	(Italy) Marco Butti	(Italy) MM Motorsport	(Italy) Marco Butti	(Spain) Felipe Fernández
2	4	(Belgium) Circuit de Spa-Francorchamps		(Italy) Marco Butti	(France) Teddy Clairet	(France) Team Clairet Sport	(Sweden) Viktor Andersson	(Italy) Nicola Baldan
3	5	(Germany) Hockenheimring	(Italy) Marco Butti	(France) Jimmy Clairet	(Republic of Ireland) Max Hart	(Italy) Target Competition	(Italy) Marco Butti	(Sweden) Mikael Karlsson
3	6	(Germany) Hockenheimring		(France) Julien Briché	(Italy) Felice Jelmini	(Italy) PMA Motorsport	(Spain) Eric Gené	(Sweden) Mikael Karlsson
4	7	(Italy) Misano World Circuit Marco Simoncelli	(Estonia) Ruben Volt	(Italy) Marco Butti	(Estonia) Ruben Volt	(Estonia) ALM Motorsport	(Estonia) Ruben Volt	(Italy) Sandro Pelatti
4	8	(Italy) Misano World Circuit Marco Simoncelli		(France) Teddy Clairet	(France) Teddy Clairet	(France) Team Clairet Sport	(Spain) Eric Gené	(Italy) Sandro Pelatti
5	9	(Austria) Red Bull Ring	(Spain) Eric Gené	(Spain) Eric Gené	(Spain) Eric Gené	(Spain) Monlau Motorsport	(Spain) Eric Gené	(Spain) Victor Fernández
5	10	(Austria) Red Bull Ring		(Republic of Ireland) Max Hart	(United Kingdom) Jenson Brickley	(Spain) Monlau Motorsport	(United Kingdom) Jenson Brickley	(Spain) Victor Fernández
6	11	(Spain) Circuit de Barcelona-Catalunya	(Estonia) Ruben Volt	(Estonia) Ruben Volt	(Estonia) Ruben Volt	(Estonia) ALM Motorsport	(Estonia) Ruben Volt	(Italy) Giacomo Ghermandi
6	12	(Spain) Circuit de Barcelona-Catalunya		(South Korea) Park June-sung	(South Korea) Park June-sung	(South Korea) Solite Indigo Racing	(Estonia) Ruben Volt	(Italy) Giacomo Ghermandi

== Championship standings ==
Scoring system

Position	1st	2nd	3rd	4th	5th	6th	7th	8th	9th	10th	11th	12th	13th	14th	15th
Qualifying	10	8	6	4	2	1	—N/a								
Races	30	25	22	20	18	16	14	12	10	8	6	4	3	2	1

=== Drivers' championship ===
Pos.	Driver	PRT (Portugal)		SPA (Belgium)		HOC (Germany)		MIS (Italy)		RBR (Austria)		CAT (Spain)		Pts.
1	(United Kingdom) Jenson Brickley	2	1	Ret	15	10	9	2^{3}	5	11	1	2^{4}	4	208
2	(France) Teddy Clairet	3^{6}	4	5	1	Ret	6	10	1	12	7	4	2	208
3	(France) Jimmy Clairet	1^{1}	5	12	2	3	3	Ret	Ret	5	15	3^{6}	3	195
4	(Spain) Eric Gené	5^{3}	Ret	4^{2}	8	5^{5}	5	18	2	1^{1}	13	9^{5}	9	192
5	(Italy) Marco Butti	Ret^{4}	3	1^{6}	16	2^{1}	13	Ret	3	3^{3}	2	18	11	172
6	(South Korea) Park June-sung	9	11	2^{5}	4	14	7	6^{6}	7	9	Ret	6	1	156
7	(Estonia) Ruben Volt	Ret	8	Ret^{4}	6	6	11	1^{1}	13	15	9	1^{1}	DSQ	151
8	(Republic of Ireland) Max Hart	11	7	15	11	1^{3}	2	11	15	7	3	11	10	145
9	(Spain) Felipe Fernández	12^{5}	2	8^{1}	17	8	Ret	5	4	Ret	8	17^{2}	5	141
10	(Italy) Nicola Baldan	6	9	7	7	4^{2}	12	13	Ret	4^{4}	6	19	13	133
11	(Sweden) Viktor Andersson	7	6	14	3	12	16	7^{5}	8	8	Ret	5	8	130
12	(Canada) Nicolas Taylor	4	18	6	9	13^{6}	Ret	12	11	2^{2}	4	Ret	19	117
13	(South Korea) Park Jun-ui	14	13	9	5	Ret^{4}	Ret	9	10	Ret	DNS	10	7	81
14	(Spain) Santiago Concepción	17	17	3^{3}	Ret	Ret	8	4^{4}	9	10	Ret	WD	WD	75
15	(Germany) Rene Kircher									6^{6}	5	8	6	63
16	(Italy) Felice Jelmini	Ret^{2}	12	WD	WD	7	1							56
17	(Italy) Jacopo Cimenes							3^{2}	6	Ret^{5}	DNS	Ret^{3}	DNS	54
18	(France) Julien Briché	8	19	11	Ret	9	4			13	Ret	16	Ret	51
19	(Italy) Filippo Barberi	10	10	10	10	Ret	17	15	Ret	Ret	10	20	18	41
20	(Italy) Michele Imberti							8	12					20
21	(Italy) Gabriele Covini									14	Ret	7	20	16
22	(Sweden) Mikael Karlsson					11	10							14
23	(Spain) Victor Fernández	13	16	18	14	15	15	17	17	17	11	Ret	DNS	13
24	(Italy) Giacomo Ghermandi	DNS	Ret							18	12	12	14	11
25	(France) Raphael Fournier									16	14	Ret	12	8
26	(France) Pierre Arnaud Navarro	16	14	16	12	Ret	18							6
27	(Estonia) Sten Dorian Piirimägi			13	13									6
28	(Italy) Sandro Pelatti							14	16	Ret	Ret	13	21	5
29	(France) Jean Laurent Navarro	15	15	Ret	Ret	Ret	14							4
30	(Turkey) Vedat Ali Dalokay							16	14					2
31	(Italy) Giacomo Prandelli											14	16	1
32	(Canada) Gary Kwok											15	22	1
33	(United Kingdom) Steven Laidlaw											Ret	15	1
34	(Estonia) Sven Karuse			17	Ret									0
35	(United Kingdom) Sam Laidlaw											Ret	17	0
–	(Spain) Rubén Fernández									WD	WD			–
Pos.	Driver	PRT (Portugal)		SPA (Belgium)		HOC (Germany)		MIS (Italy)		RBR (Austria)		CAT (Spain)		Pts.

Colour	Result
Gold	Winner
Silver	Second place
Bronze	Third place
Green	Points classification
Blue	Non-points classification
Blue	Non-classified finish (NC)
Purple	Retired, not classified (Ret)
Red	Did not qualify (DNQ)
Red	Did not pre-qualify (DNPQ)
Black	Disqualified (DSQ)
White	Did not start (DNS)
White	Withdrew (WD)
White	Race cancelled (C)
Blank	Did not practice (DNP)
Blank	Did not arrive (DNA)
Blank	Excluded (EX)

^{1} ^{2} ^{3} ^{4} ^{5} ^{6} ^{7} – Points-scoring position in qualifying, only counting Rookie drivers.

11† – Drivers did not finish the race, but were classified as they completed over 75% of the race distance.

=== Teams' championship ===
Pos.	Team	Pts.
1	(Spain) Monlau Motorsport	407
2	(France) Team Clairet Sport	405
3	(South Korea) Solite Indigo Racing	239
4	(Estonia) ALM Motorsport	237
5	(Italy) MM Motorsport	232
6	(Spain) RC2 Racing Team	219
7	(Italy) PMA Motorsport	178
8	(Italy) Aikoa Racing	175
9	(Italy) Target Competition	145
10	(Sweden) MA:GP	132
11	(France) JSB Compétition	70
12	(Italy) Kombat Motorsport	20
13	(Italy) BRC Racing Team	16
14	(United Kingdom) Area Motorsport	1
