= 2024 FIA Motorsport Games Touring Car Cup =

Car cup

Race details
Date	23–27 October
Official name	FIA Motorsport Games Touring Car Cup
Location	Circuit Ricardo Tormo, Spain
Course	Permanent circuit 4.005 km (2.489 mi)
Distance	Qualifying; 30 minute Qualifying Race; 25 minutes +1 lap Main Race; 30 minutes +1 lap
- Qualifying Race

Pole
Driver	(Argentina) Ignacio Montenegro	Team Argentina
Time	1:41.236

Fastest lap
Driver	(Argentina) Ignacio Montenegro	Team Argentina
Time	1:40.072

Podium
First	(Argentina) Ignacio Montenegro	Team Argentina
Second	(Spain) Eric Gené	Team Spain
Third	(Czech Republic) Adam Kout	Team Czech Republic
- Main Race

Pole
Driver	(Argentina) Ignacio Montenegro	Team Argentina

Fastest lap
Driver	(Argentina) Ignacio Montenegro	Team Argentina
Time	1:42.266

Medalists
1st place, gold medalist(s)	(Argentina) Ignacio Montenegro	Team Argentina
2nd place, silver medalist(s)	(Brazil) Raphael Reis	Team Brazil
3rd place, bronze medalist(s)	(Czech Republic) Adam Kout	Team Czech Republic

The 2024 FIA Motorsport Games Touring Car Cup was the third FIA Motorsport Games Touring Car Cup, held at Circuit Ricardo Tormo, Spain on 23 October to 27 October 2024. The race was contested with TCR Touring Car spec cars. The event was part of the 2024 FIA Motorsport Games.

== Entry list ==
Team	Entrant	Car	No.	Driver
Team France	(France) SP Competition	Cupra León VZ TCR	7	Aurélien Comte
Team Sweden	(Sweden) TPR Motorsport	Honda Civic Type R TCR (FL5)	17	Jonathan Engström
Team Spain	(Spain) Monlau Motorsport	Cupra León VZ TCR	19	Eric Gené
Team Argentina	(Spain) GOAT Racing	Honda Civic Type R TCR (FL5)	23	Ignacio Montenegro
Team Belgium	(France) SP Competition	Cupra León VZ TCR	34	Giovanni Scamardi
Team Canada	(Spain) GOAT Racing	Audi RS 3 LMS TCR (2021)	38	Megan Tomlinson
Team Denmark	(Sweden) TPR Motorsport	Honda Civic Type R TCR (FL5)	41	René Povlsen
Team Czech Republic	(Czech Republic) Janik Motorsport	Hyundai Elantra N TCR	68	Adam Kout
Team Bangladesh	(Spain) GOAT Racing	Honda Civic Type R TCR (FL5)	71	Avik Anwar
Team Brazil	(Spain) Monlau Motorsport	Cupra León VZ TCR	77	Raphael Reis
Team Germany	(Germany) Mertel Motorsport	Honda Civic Type R TCR (FL5)	82	René Kircher
Team Indonesia	(Estonia) ALM Motorsport	Honda Civic Type R TCR (FL5)	86	Umar Abdullah
(Turkey) Team Türkiye	(Turkey) Texaco Team AMS	Audi RS 3 LMS TCR (2021)	95	Zekai Özen
Team Italy	(Spain) GOAT Racing	Honda Civic Type R TCR (FL5)	99	Marco Butti
(United Kingdom) Team Great Britain	(United Kingdom) Jenson Brickley Racing	Cupra León VZ TCR	246	Jenson Brickley

== Qualifying ==
=== Qualifying results ===
Pos	No.	Driver	Team	Time	Gap	Grid
1	23	Ignacio Montenegro	Team Argentina	1:41.236	—	1
2	77	Raphael Reis	Team Brazil	1:41.789	+0.553	2
3	19	Eric Gené	Team Spain	1:41.827	+0.591	3
4	7	Aurélien Comte	Team France	1:41.853	+0.617	4
5	82	René Kircher	Team Germany	1:42.160	+0.924	5
6	246	Jenson Brickley	(United Kingdom) Team Great Britain	1:42.196	+0.960	6
7	68	Adam Kout	Team Czech Republic	1:42.256	+1.020	7
8	41	René Povlsen	Team Denmark	1:42.460	+1.224	8
9	99	Marco Butti	Team Italy	1:42.638	+1.402	9
10	38	Megan Tomlinson	Team Canada	1:44.417	+3.181	10
11	95	Zekai Özen	(Turkey) Team Türkiye	1:44.636	+3.400	11
12	71	Avik Anwar	Team Bangladesh	1:46.463	+5.227	12
13	86	Umar Abdullah	Team Indonesia	No time		13

== Races ==
=== Qualifying race results ===
Pos	No.	Driver	Team	Laps	Time/Retired	Grid
1	23	Ignacio Montenegro	Team Argentina	15	27:36.352	1
2	19	Eric Gené	Team Spain	15	+0.558	3
3	68	Adam Kout	Team Czech Republic	15	+9.789	7
4	77	Raphael Reis	Team Brazil	15	+11.541	2
5	41	René Povlsen	Team Denmark	15	+18.436	8
6	7	Aurélien Comte	Team France	15	+26.822	4
7	86	Umar Abdullah	Team Indonesia	15	+31.141	13
8	71	Avik Anwar	Team Bangladesh	15	+31.971	12
9	99	Marco Butti	Team Italy	13	+2 Laps	9
Ret	82	René Kircher	Team Germany	9	Retired	5
Ret	38	Megan Tomlinson	Team Canada	4	Retired	10
Ret	246	Jenson Brickley	(United Kingdom) Team Great Britain	3	Retired	6
Ret	95	Zekai Özen	(Turkey) Team Türkiye	0	Retired	11

=== Main race results ===
Pos	No.	Driver	Team	Laps	Time/Retired	Grid
1	23	Ignacio Montenegro	Team Argentina	18	32:26.640	1
2	77	Raphael Reis	Team Brazil	18	+24.635	4
3	68	Adam Kout	Team Czech Republic	18	+25.158	3
4	19	Eric Gené	Team Spain	18	+34.347	2
5	41	René Povlsen	Team Denmark	18	+37.884	5
6	7	Aurélien Comte	Team France	18	+48.533	6
7	246	Jenson Brickley	(United Kingdom) Team Great Britain	18	+55.157	12
8	95	Zekai Özen	(Turkey) Team Türkiye	18	+1:03.011	13
9	86	Umar Abdullah	Team Indonesia	18	+1:31.280	7
10	71	Avik Anwar	Team Bangladesh	17	+1 Lap	8
11	38	Megan Tomlinson	Team Canada	17	+1 Lap	11
DNS	82	René Kircher	Team Germany	0	Did not start	10
DSQ	99	Marco Butti	Team Italy	—	Disqualified	9
