= Jenson Brickley =

British racing driver (born 2004)

- Nationality: (United Kingdom) British
- Born: Jenson Ellis Brickley; 9 April 2004 (age 22) Kirkby Mallory, England

Championship titles
- 2025 2022 2021: TCR Europe Touring Car Series; BRSCC Fiesta Championship – ST240; Ford Fiesta Junior Championship

Jenson Ellis Brickley (born 9 April 2004) is a British racing driver competing in the TCR World Tour for ALM Motorsport.

== Career ==
Brickley initially competed in karting, before moving to Ministox competition, in which he won the European title in 2018 and the National title in 2019. The following year, Brickley raced in the Ford Fiesta Junior Championship, in which he scored two podiums en route to a sixth-place points finish. Returning to the championship the following year, Brickley won four times and held off a mid-season charge by Deagen Fairclough to take the title. Brickley then moved to the BRSCC Fiesta Championship for 2022, taking the title on dropped scores from Alastair Kellett.

In 2023, Brickley joined the TCR UK grid with his family-run team to make his debut in TCR competition. In the second round of the season at Croft, Brickley took his maiden series win in the reverse-grid race two. Brickley won race two at Knockhill two rounds later, but was demoted to second after being given a penalty for making contact with Alex Ley on the penultimate lap. After scoring three more podiums in the following three rounds of the season, Brickley ended his maiden year in TCR racing third in points.

Remaining with his family team, Brickley switched to TCR Spain for 2024, taking a lone win at Valencia and four further podiums to end the year runner-up to Ignacio Montenegro by 20 points. During 2024, Brickley also made his debut in TCR Europe by competing in the season-ending round at Valencia, and also represented Great Britain in the FIA Motorsport Games Touring Car Cup.

Brickley then joined Monlau Motorsport to race full-time in TCR Spain and TCR Europe. In the season-opening round at Algarve, Brickley finished second in race one before winning race two. Brickley then finished second at Misano two rounds later, before taking his second win of the season in the following round Red Bull Ring. In the season-ending round at Barcelona, Brickley finished second in race one and fourth in race two, which helped him secure the TCR Europe title on countback as he was level on points with Teddy Clairet. In TCR Spain, Brickley scored four podiums, with three of those being second-place finishes, as he ended the year third in points in his sophomore season in the series.

In 2026, Brickley joined ALM Motorsport to race in the European rounds of TCR World Tour. During 2026, Brickley also made one-off appearances for G Racing Motorsport in TCR South America and RC2 Racing Team in the TCR Europe Cup. Towards the end of 2026, Brickley competed in the last two rounds of Michelin Pilot Challenge for Stallion Motorsports in the TCR class.

== Racing record ==
=== Racing career summary ===
Season	Series	Team	Races	Wins	Poles	F/Laps	Podiums	Points	Position
2020	Ford Fiesta Junior Championship		8	0	0	1	2	214	6th
2021	Ford Fiesta Junior Championship		14	4	1	5	12	563	**1st**
2022	BRSCC Fiesta Championship – ST240		18	3	3	5	13	719	**1st**
2023	TCR UK Touring Car Championship	Jenson Brickley Racing	15	1	2	5	6	347	**3rd**
2024	TCR Spain Touring Car Championship	Jenson Brickley Racing	8	1	0	0	5	223	**2nd**
2024	TCR Europe Touring Car Series	Jenson Brickley Racing	2	0	0	0	0	11	19th
2024	FIA Motorsport Games Touring Car Cup	Team Great Britain	1	0	0	0	0	—N/a	7th
2025	TCR Spain Touring Car Championship	Monlau Motorsport	10	0	0	0	4	278	**3rd**
2025	TCR Europe Touring Car Series	Monlau Motorsport	12	2	0	1	5	208	**1st**
2026	TCR South America Touring Car Championship	G Racing Motorsport	1	0	0	0	1	43*	21th*
2026	TCR Europe Cup	RC2 Racing Team	1	0	0	0	0	0	16th
2026	TCR World Tour	ALM Motorsport	9	0	0	0	0	72*	12th*
2026	Michelin Pilot Challenge – TCR	Stallion Motorsports	2	0	0	0	0	360	31st

^{*} Season still in progress.

=== Complete TCR UK Touring Car Championship results ===
(key) (Races in bold indicate pole position) (Races in italics indicate fastest lap)

Year	Team	Car	1	2	3	4	5	6	7	8	9	10	11	12	13	14	15	Pos	Pts
2023	Jenson Brickley Racing	Cupra León Competición TCR	SNE; 1; 8	SNE; 2; 8	CRO; 1; 8	CRO; 2; 1	OUL; 1; 8	OUL; 2; 4	KNO; 1; 5^{6}	KNO; 2; 2	KNO; 3; 2^{2}	SIL; 1; 2	SIL; 2; 8	**DON**; **1**; 2^{1}	DON; 2 Ret	**BHI**; **1**; 6^{1}	BHI; 2; 2	3rd	347

=== Complete TCR Europe Touring Car Series results ===
(key) (Races in bold indicate pole position) (Races in italics indicate fastest lap)

Year	Team	Car	1	2	3	4	5	6	7	8	9	10	11	12	DC	Points
2024	Jenson Brickley Racing	Cupra León VZ TCR	VAL; 1	VAL; 2	ZOL; 1	ZOL; 2	SAL; 1	SAL; 2	SPA; 1	SPA; 2	BRN; 1	BRN; 2	CRT; 1; 10	CRT; 2 Ret	19th	11
2025	Monlau Motorsport	Cupra León VZ TCR	PRT; 1; 2	PRT; 2; 1	SPA; 1 Ret	SPA; 2; 15	HOC; 1; 10	HOC; 2; 9	MIS; 1; 2^{3}	MIS; 2; 5	RBR; 1; 11	RBR; 2; 1	CAT; 1; 2^{4}	CAT; 2; 4	1st	208

^{†} Driver did not finish, but was classified as he completed over 75% of the race distance.

=== Complete TCR World Tour results ===
(key) (Races in bold indicate pole position) (Races in italics indicate fastest lap)

Year	Team	Car	1	2	3	4	5	6	7	8	9	10	11	12	13	14	15	16	17	18	19	20	DC	Points
2026	ALM Motorsport	Honda Civic Type R TCR	MIS; 1 Ret	MIS; 2; 8	CRT; 1; 6	CRT; 2; 22	CRT; 3; 19	LEC; 1; 11	LEC; 2; 8	CVR; 1; 8	CVR; 2; 8	INJ; 1	INJ; 2	INJ; 3	CHE; 1	CHE; 2	CHE; 3	ZHZ; 1	ZHZ; 2	ZHZ; 3	MAC; 1	MAC; 2	12th*	72*

^{*} Season still in progress.

=== Complete Michelin Pilot Challenge results ===
(key) (Races in bold indicate pole position) (Races in italics indicate fastest lap)

Year	Entrant	Class	Make	1	2	3	4	5	6	7	8	9	10	Rank	Points
2026	Stallion Motorsports	TCR	Cupra León VZ TCR	DAY	SEB	LGA	MOH	WGL	MOS	ELK	VIR	IMS; 12	ATL; 14	31st	360
