= Raphael Reis =

Brazilian racing driver (born 2005)

- Nationality: Brazilian
- Born: Raphael Reis de Sá; 21 May 1993 (age 33) Brasília, Brazil

TCR South America
- Teams: W2 ProGP
- Starts: 84
- Wins: 8

Previous series
- Stock Car Pro Series; Stock Light

Championship titles
- 2018 Stock Light
Medal record
Touring Car Racing
Representing Brazil
FIA Motorsport Games
Silver medal – second place	2024 Valencia	Touring Car Cup

Raphael Reis de Sá (born 21 May 1983) is a Brazilian racing driver who is compete in TCR South America. He was crowned 2018 Stock Light champion and competed some races in Stock Car Pro Series.

== Complete FIA Motorsport Games Touring Car Cup results ==
Year	Team	Cup	Qualifying	Quali Race	Main race
2024	Team Brazil	TCR Touring Car	2nd	4th	2nd
