= Ignacio Montenegro =

Argentine racing driver (born 2004)

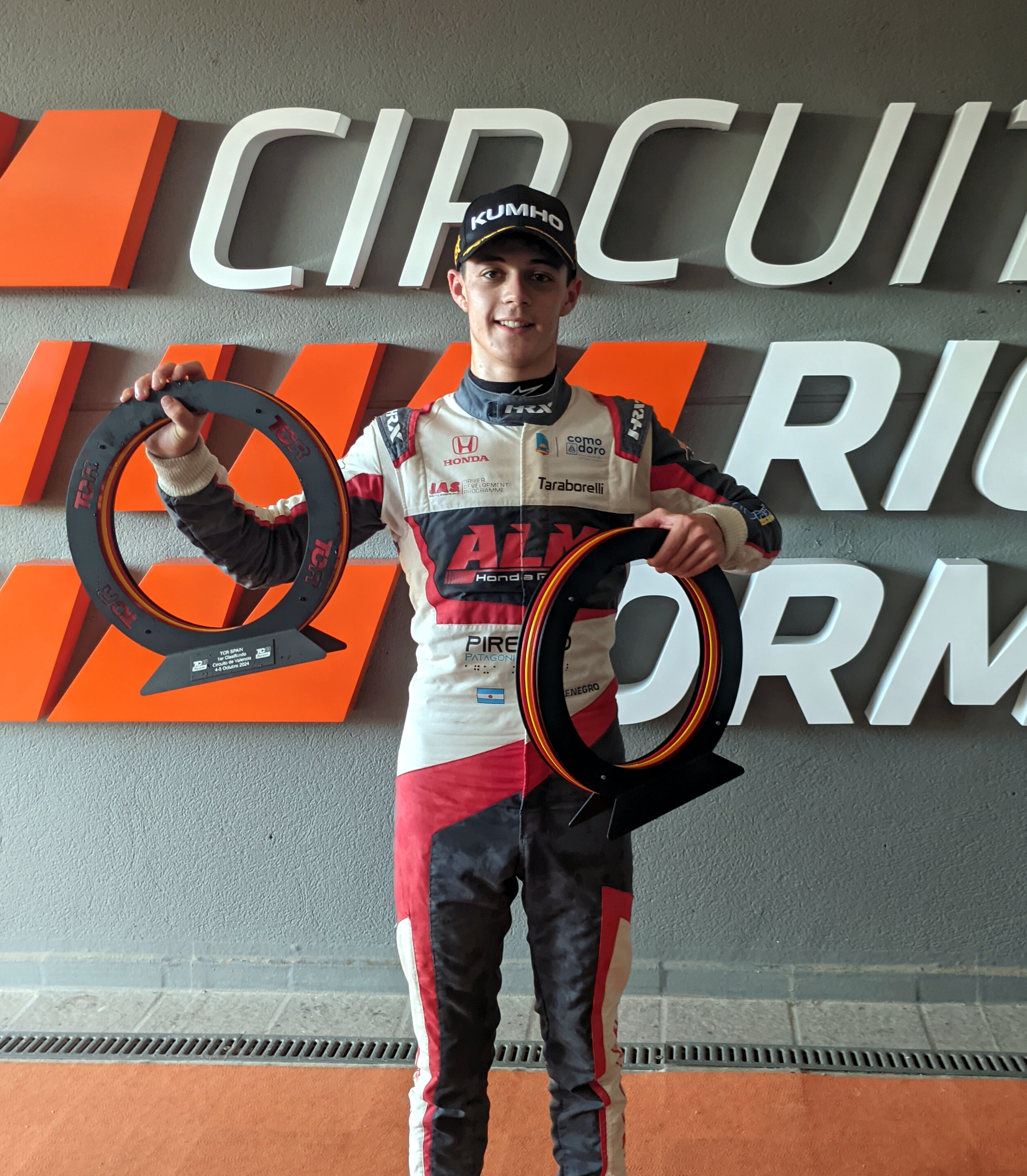
- Montenegro in 2024
- Nationality: Argentine
- Born: 23 November 2004 (age 21) Rada Tilly, Chubut, Argentina

TCR South America Touring Car Championship career
- Debut season: 2022
- Current team: Squadra Martino
- Categorisation: FIA Silver
- Starts: 15
- Championships: 0
- Wins: 5
- Podiums: 6
- Poles: 1
- Fastest laps: 0

Previous series
- F4 Spanish Championship, Fórmula Renault 2.0 Argentina, Súper TC2000/TC2000 Series
Medal record
Touring Car Racing
Representing Argentina
FIA Motorsport Games
Gold medal – first place	2024 Valencia	Touring Car Cup

Ignacio "Nacho" Montenegro (born 23 November 2004) is an Argentine motor racing driver who currently competes in GT World Challenge Europe for Team WRT. A graduate of the national touring car scene in TC2000, he was TCR South America champion in 2023, won gold medal at the 2024 FIA Motorsport Games and came tenth in the 2025 TCR World Tour.

== Racing record ==
=== Racing career summary ===
Season	Series	Team	Races	Wins	Poles	F/Laps	Podiums	Points	Position
2020	F4 Spanish Championship	MP Motorsport	6	0	0	0	0	0	25th
2020–21	Fórmula Renault 2.0 Argentina	Croizet Racing	10	0	0	0	1	126	9th
2021	Súper TC2000	Puma Energy Honda Racing	3	0	0	0	0	0	NC†
2021	TC2000	Toyota Young	24	4	1	3	11	246	**3rd**
2022	TC2000	Axion Energy Sport	22	1	0	0	5	198	6th
2022	TC2000 Series	Axion Energy Sport	24	0	0	0	8	237	**2nd**
2022	TCR South America Touring Car Championship	Crown Racing	1	0	0	0	0	33	35th
2022	TCR South America Touring Car Championship	Cobra Racing Team	2	0	0	0	0	33	35th
2022	Turismo Nacional - Clase 3	Alifraco Sport	2	0	0	0	0	7	47th
2022	FIA Motorsport Games Touring Car Cup	Team Argentina	2	0	0	0	0	N/A	4th
2023	TC2000	Axion Energy Sport	19	4	2	3	8	255	**3rd**
2023	TCR South America Touring Car Championship	Squadra Martino	18	5	3	2	7	468	**1st**
2023	TCR World Tour	Squadra Martino	4	0	0	0	0	20	26th
2023	TCR Brazil Touring Car Championship	Squadra Martino	11	2	3	0	4	261	**2nd**
2024	TCR Europe Touring Car Series	ALM Motorsport	12	1	1	0	5	342	**3rd**
2024	TCR Spain Winter Series	ALM Motorsport	4	3	0	2	4	169	**1st**
2024	TCR Eastern Europe Trophy	ALM Motorsport	2	0	0	0	1	0	NC†
2024	TCR South America Touring Car Championship	Squadra Martino	1	0	1	0	0	10	54th
2024	TCR Brazil Touring Car Championship	Squadra Martino	1	0	1	0	0	10	30th
2024	FIA Motorsport Games Touring Car Cup	Team Argentina	1	1	1	1	1	N/A	**1st**
2025	TCR World Tour	GOAT Racing	20	0	0	1	2	253	10th
2025	TCR Australia Touring Car Series	GOAT Racing	4	0	0	0	1	0	NC†
2026	GT World Challenge Europe Endurance Cup	Team WRT	5	0	0	0	0	10	24th
2026	GT World Challenge Europe Sprint Cup	Team WRT	10	0	0	0	1	17.5	18th
2026	Nürburgring Langstrecken-Serie - BMW M240i	Adrenalin Motorsport Team Mainhattan Wheels							

^{†} As Montenegro was a guest driver, he was ineligible to score points.

=== Complete F4 Spanish Championship results ===
(key) (Races in bold indicate pole position) (Races in italics indicate fastest lap)

Year	Team	1	2	3	4	5	6	7	8	9	10	11	12	13	14	15	16	17	18	19	20	21	DC	Points
2020	MP Motorsport	NAV; 1	NAV; 2	NAV; 3	LEC; 1	LEC; 2	LEC; 3	JER; 1; 12	JER; 2; 12	JER; 3; 18	CRT; 1; 19	CRT; 2; 18	CRT; 3; 11	ARA; 1	ARA; 2	ARA; 3	JAR; 1	JAR; 2	JAR; 3	CAT; 1	CAT; 2	CAT; 3	25th	0

=== Complete FIA Motorsport Games Touring Car Cup results ===
Year	Team	Cup	Qualifying	Quali Race	Main race
2022	Team Argentina	**TCR Touring Car**	6th	5th	4th
2024	Team Argentina	**TCR Touring Car**	**1st**	**1st**	**1st**

=== Complete TCR World Tour results ===
(key) (Races in bold indicate pole position) (Races in italics indicate fastest lap)

Year	Team	Car	1	2	3	4	5	6	7	8	9	10	11	12	13	14	15	16	17	18	19	20	21	DC	Points
2023	Squadra Martino	Honda Civic Type R TCR (FK7)	ALG; 1	ALG; 2	SPA; 1	SPA; 2	VAL; 1	VAL; 2	HUN; 1	HUN; 2	ELP; 1; 10	ELP; 2 Ret	VIL; 1; 9	VIL; 2; 14	SYD; 1	SYD; 2	SYD; 3	BAT; 1	BAT; 2	BAT; 3	MAC; 1	MAC; 2		26th	20
2025	GOAT Racing	Honda Civic Type R TCR	AHR; 1 Ret	AHR; 2; 7	AHR; 3; 4	CRT; 1 Ret	CRT; 2; 6	CRT; 3; 8	MNZ; 1; 4	MNZ; 2; 5	CVR; 1; 9	CVR; 2; 3	BEN; 1 C	BEN; 2; 7	BEN; 3; 3	INJ; 1; 7	INJ; 2; 11	INJ; 3; 10	ZHZ; 1; 11	ZHZ; 2; 8	ZHZ; 3 Ret	MAC; 1; 15	MAC; 2; 4	10th	253

=== Complete TCR Europe Touring Car Series results ===
(key) (Races in bold indicate pole position) (Races in italics indicate fastest lap)

Year	Team	Car	1	2	3	4	5	6	7	8	9	10	11	12	DC	Points
2024	ALM Motorsport	Honda Civic Type R TCR (FL5)	VAL; 1; 3^{4}	VAL; 2; 6	ZOL; 1; 7^{5}	ZOL; 2; 6	SAL; 1; 2^{2}	SAL; 2; 4	SPA; 1; 5	SPA; 2; 1	BRN; 1; 8^{4}	BRN; 2; 2	**CRT**; **1**; 2^{1}	CRT; 2; 15	3rd	342

=== Complete GT World Challenge Europe results ===
==== GT World Challenge Europe Endurance Cup ====
(key) (Races in bold indicate pole position) (Races in italics indicate fastest lap)

Year	Team	Car	Class	1	2	3	4	5	6	7	Pos.	Points
2026	Team WRT	BMW M4 GT3 Evo	Silver	LEC; 18	MNZ; 17	SPA; 6H; 24	SPA; 12H; 20	SPA; 24H; 15	**NÜR**; 14	**ALG**; 5	1st	113

==== GT World Challenge Europe Sprint Cup ====
(key) (Races in bold indicate pole position) (Races in italics indicate fastest lap)

Year	Team	Car	Class	1	2	3	4	5	6	7	8	9	10	Pos.	Points
2026	Team WRT	BMW M4 GT3 Evo	Silver	**BRH**; **1**; 15	**BRH**; **2**; 8	MIS; 1; 10	MIS; 2; 17	MAG; 1; 13	**MAG**; **2**; 2	**ZAN**; **1**; 8	ZAN; 2; 16	CAT; 1; 33	CAT; 2 Ret	1st	123

Sporting positions
Preceded by Fabricio Pezzini	TCR South America Touring Car Championship; Champion; 2023	Succeeded by Pedro Cardoso
