= 2024 TCR Eastern Europe Trophy =

2024 European motorsport season

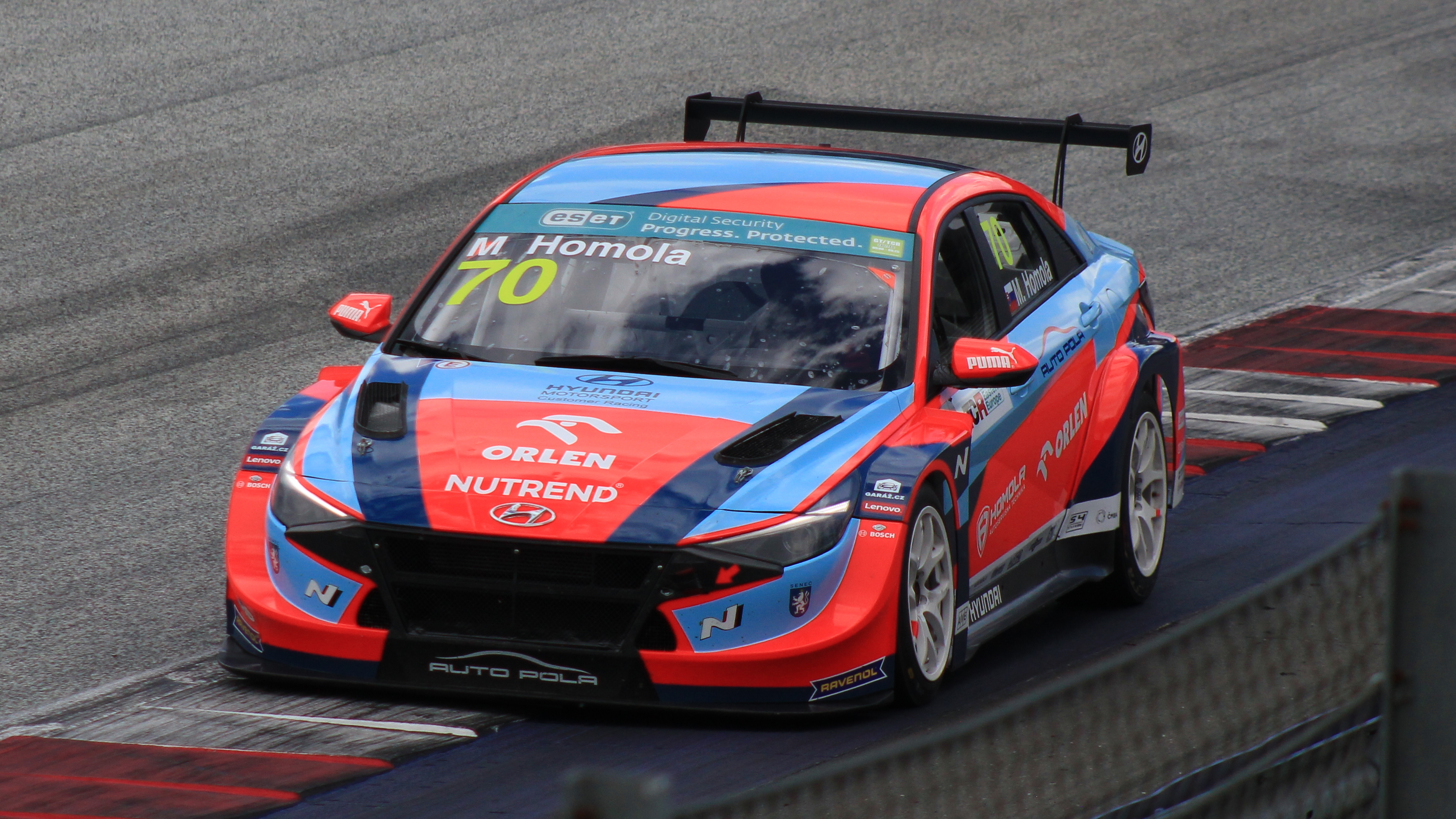
Maťo Homola is the current championship leader.

The 2024 TCR Eastern Europe Trophy was the sixth season of the TCR Eastern Europe Trophy.

== Calendar ==
The 2024 calendar was announced on 1 September 2023. Two new circuits - the Balaton Park Circuit in Hungary and the Salzburgring in Austria were added to the calendar. The season remains at six events with two races per event for a total of 12 races.

Part of the TCR European Endurance
Part of the 2024 TCR Europe Touring Car Series

Rnd.		Circuit/Location	Date
1	1	Balaton Park Circuit, Balatonfőkajár, Hungary	27–28 April
1	2	Balaton Park Circuit, Balatonfőkajár, Hungary	27–28 April
2	3	Red Bull Ring, Spielberg, Austria	18–19 May
2	4	Red Bull Ring, Spielberg, Austria	18–19 May
3	5	Automotodróm Slovakia Ring, Orechová Potôň, Slovakia	8–9 June
3	6	Automotodróm Slovakia Ring, Orechová Potôň, Slovakia	8–9 June
4	7	Autodrom Most, Most, Czech Republic	3–4 August
4	8	Autodrom Most, Most, Czech Republic	3–4 August
5	9	Brno Circuit, Brno, Czech Republic	7–8 September
5	10	Brno Circuit, Brno, Czech Republic	7–8 September
6	11	Salzburgring, Plainfeld, Austria	21–22 September
6	12	Salzburgring, Plainfeld, Austria	21–22 September

== Teams and drivers ==
Team	Car	No.	Drivers	Class	Rounds	Ref.
(Italy) MM Motorsport	Honda Civic Type R TCR (FL5)	3	(Italy) Giacomo Ghermandi		All	
(France) SP Competition	Cupra León VZ TCR	7	(France) Aurélien Comte		5	
(France) SP Competition	Cupra León VZ TCR	34	(Belgium) Giovanni Scamardi		5	
(Germany) Mertel Motorsport	Honda Civic Type R TCR (FK8)	8	(Germany) René Kircher		All	
(Germany) Mertel Motorsport	Honda Civic Type R TCR (FK8)	9	(Georgia (country)) Davit Kajaia		All	
(Germany) Mertel Motorsport	Honda Civic Type R TCR (FK8)	10	(Austria) Jorden Dolischka	J	1–4	
(Germany) Mertel Motorsport	Honda Civic Type R TCR (FK8)	20	(Austria) Jorden Dolischka	J	5–6	
(Sweden) MA:GP	Lynk & Co 03 TCR	10	(Sweden) Viktor Andersson		5	
(Czech Republic) Janik Motorsport	Hyundai Elantra N TCR	11	(Czech Republic) Jiří Zbožínek	J	All	
(Czech Republic) Janik Motorsport	Hyundai Elantra N TCR	68	(Czech Republic) Adam Kout		All	
(Czech Republic) Janik Motorsport	Hyundai Elantra N TCR	70	(Slovakia) Maťo Homola		All	
(Czech Republic) Express Auto Racing	Cupra León Competición TCR	14	(Czech Republic) Petr Čížek		All	
(Czech Republic) Express Auto Racing	Cupra León Competición TCR	82	(Czech Republic) Vít Smejkal		All	
(Spain) GOAT Racing	Honda Civic Type R TCR (FL5)	19	(Spain) Felipe Fernández		5	
(Spain) GOAT Racing	Honda Civic Type R TCR (FL5)	33	(Spain) Santiago Concepción		5	
(Estonia) ALM Motorsport	Honda Civic Type R TCR (FL5)	23	(Argentina) Ignacio Montenegro		5	
(Estonia) ALM Motorsport	Honda Civic Type R TCR (FL5)	27	(Estonia) Ruben Volt		5	
(Estonia) ALM Motorsport	Honda Civic Type R TCR (FL5)	64	(Hungary) Levente Losonczy		5	
(Hungary) M1RA	Hyundai i30 N TCR	33	(Hungary) Attila Bucsi	J	1–4, 6	
(Czech Republic) Aditis Racing	Audi RS 3 LMS TCR (2021)	38	(Czech Republic) Radim Adámek		3	
(Czech Republic) Aditis Racing	Audi RS 3 LMS TCR (2021)	301	(Czech Republic) Martin Kadlečík	J	1, 3–4	
(Croatia) Auto Klub Dubrovnik	Cupra León Competición TCR	48	(Croatia) Fraňo Dubreta		1, 5–6	
(Croatia) Auto Klub Dubrovnik	Hyundai Elantra N TCR	74	(Croatia) Žarko Knego		All	
(Spain) Monlau Motorsport	Cupra León VZ TCR	72	(Argentina) Franco Girolami		5	
(North Macedonia) PSS Racing Team with Monlau	Cupra León VZ TCR	110	(North Macedonia) Viktor Davidovski		5	
(Latvia) LV Racing	Audi RS 3 LMS TCR (2021)	121	(Latvia) Ivars Vallers		All	

J - eligible for Junior Championship

== Results ==
Rnd.		Circuit	Pole position	Fastest lap	Winning driver	Winning team	Winning Junior driver
1	1	(Hungary) Balaton Park Circuit	(Czech Republic) Adam Kout	(Czech Republic) Adam Kout	(Slovakia) Maťo Homola	(Czech Republic) Janik Motorsport	(Czech Republic) Martin Kadlečík
1	2	(Hungary) Balaton Park Circuit		(Hungary) Attila Bucsi	(Hungary) Attila Bucsi	(Hungary) M1RA	(Hungary) Attila Bucsi
2	3	(Austria) Red Bull Ring	(Hungary) Attila Bucsi	(Czech Republic) Adam Kout	(Slovakia) Maťo Homola	(Czech Republic) Janik Motorsport	(Hungary) Attila Bucsi
2	4	(Austria) Red Bull Ring		(Hungary) Attila Bucsi	(Hungary) Attila Bucsi	(Hungary) M1RA	(Hungary) Attila Bucsi
3	5	Automotodróm Slovakia Ring	(Slovakia) Maťo Homola	(Slovakia) Maťo Homola	(Slovakia) Maťo Homola	(Czech Republic) Janik Motorsport	(Hungary) Attila Bucsi
3	6	Automotodróm Slovakia Ring		(Czech Republic) Adam Kout	(Hungary) Attila Bucsi	(Hungary) M1RA	(Hungary) Attila Bucsi
4	7	(Czech Republic) Autodrom Most	(Slovakia) Maťo Homola	(Czech Republic) Adam Kout	(Slovakia) Maťo Homola	(Czech Republic) Janik Motorsport	(Hungary) Attila Bucsi
4	8	(Czech Republic) Autodrom Most		(Czech Republic) Adam Kout	(Czech Republic) Adam Kout	(Czech Republic) Janik Motorsport	(Hungary) Attila Bucsi
5	9	(Czech Republic) Brno Circuit	(Argentina) Franco Girolami	(Argentina) Franco Girolami	(Argentina) Franco Girolami	(Spain) Monlau Motorsport	(Czech Republic) Martin Kadlečík
5	10	(Czech Republic) Brno Circuit		(Argentina) Franco Girolami	(Hungary) Levente Losonczy	(Estonia) ALM Motorsport	(Czech Republic) Martin Kadlečík
6	11	(Austria) Salzburgring	(Czech Republic) Adam Kout	(Slovakia) Maťo Homola	(Czech Republic) Adam Kout	(Czech Republic) Janik Motorsport	(Czech Republic) Jiří Zbožínek
6	12	(Austria) Salzburgring		(Czech Republic) Adam Kout	(Czech Republic) Adam Kout	(Czech Republic) Janik Motorsport	(Czech Republic) Jiří Zbožínek

=== Drivers' standings ===
Scoring system

Position	**1st**	**2nd**	**3rd**	**4th**	**5th**	**6th**	**7th**	**8th**	**9th**	**10th**	Fastest lap
Qualifying	3	2	1	—N/a							
Race	25	18	15	12	10	8	6	4	2	1	1

Pos.	Driver	BAL (Hungary)		RBR (Austria)		SVK (Slovakia)		MOS (Czech Republic)		BRN (Czech Republic)		SLZ (Austria)		Pts.
Pos.	Driver	R1	R2	R1	R2	R1	R2	R1	R2	R1	R2	R1	R2	Pts.
1	(Slovakia) Maťo Homola	1^{3}	3	1^{2}	4	**1**^{1}	2	**1**^{1}	4	**3**^{1}	11	6^{3}	3	236
2	(Czech Republic) Adam Kout	**2**^{1}	4	2	2	12^{2}	3	2^{3}	1	7^{3}	5	**1**^{1}	1	231
3	(Hungary) Attila Bucsi	7^{2}	1	**3**^{1}	1	2	1	4	6					141
4	(Czech Republic) Petr Čížek	5	7	Ret	5	6	6	5	2	15	Ret	4	5	98
5	(Germany) René Kircher	3	5	4	Ret	11	11	3	7	16	16	3^{2}	4	97
6	(Czech Republic) Martin Kadlečík	6	2			4^{3}	4	WD	WD	5^{2}	6			89
7	(Croatia) Žarko Knego	13	9	7	7	5	Ret	6	3	13	Ret	7	6	69
8	(Latvia) Ivars Vallers	9	12	8	3	10	10	8	Ret	17	14	5	2	67
9	(Georgia (country)) Davit Kajaia	12	8	6	8	8	5	Ret	5	11	12	Ret	DNS	64
10	(Italy) Giacomo Ghermandi	4	6	5^{3}	6	Ret	Ret	11^{2}	Ret	Ret	19	2	Ret	62
11	(Czech Republic) Jiří Zbožínek	Ret	11	9	9	3	12	7	8	12	17	8	7	51
12	(Czech Republic) Vít Smejkal	10	13	10	10	7	7	9	Ret	19	Ret			17
13	(Austria) Jorden Dolischka	11	14	11	11	Ret	9	10	9	20	18	9	8	15
14	(Croatia) Fraňo Dubreta	8	10							18	15	10	Ret	15
15	(Czech Republic) Radim Adámek					9	8							6
Guest entries ineligible for points
	(Argentina) Franco Girolami									1	9			
	(Hungary) Levente Losonczy									14	1			
	(France) Aurélien Comte									2	8			
	(Argentina) Ignacio Montenegro									8	2			
	(Sweden) Viktor Andersson									4	3			
	(Poland) Bartosz Groszek									6	4			
	(Spain) Felipe Fernández									9	7			
	(Belgium) Giovanni Scamardi									10	10			
	(North Macedonia) Viktor Davidovski									21	13			
Pos.	Driver	BAL (Hungary)		RBR (Austria)		SVK (Slovakia)		MOS (Czech Republic)		BRN (Czech Republic)		SLZ (Austria)		Pts.

Colour	Result
Gold	Winner
Silver	Second place
Bronze	Third place
Green	Points classification
Blue	Non-points classification
Blue	Non-classified finish (NC)
Purple	Retired, not classified (Ret)
Red	Did not qualify (DNQ)
Red	Did not pre-qualify (DNPQ)
Black	Disqualified (DSQ)
White	Did not start (DNS)
White	Withdrew (WD)
White	Race cancelled (C)
Blank	Did not practice (DNP)
Blank	Did not arrive (DNA)
Blank	Excluded (EX)

**Bold** – Pole

Italics – Fastest Lap

^{1 2 3} – Qualifying position

† – Drivers did not finish the race, but were classified as they completed over 70% of the race distance.
