= 2023 TCR Europe Touring Car Series =

European motorsport championship

The 2023 TCR Europe Touring Car Series will be the seventh season of TCR Europe Touring Car Series. The season is planned to began at the Algarve International Circuit in April and to end at the Circuit de Barcelona-Catalunya in October. It will also feature three rounds of the TCR World Tour.

== Calendar ==
The calendar was announced with 7 rounds scheduled.

Rnd.		Circuit/Location	Date	Supporting
1	1	Algarve International Circuit, Portimão, Portugal	28–30 April	TCR World Tour; International GT Open; Euroformula Open Championship
1	2	Algarve International Circuit, Portimão, Portugal	28–30 April	TCR World Tour; International GT Open; Euroformula Open Championship
2	3	(France) Circuit de Pau-Ville, Pau	13–14 May	Pau Grand Prix; French F4 Championship
2	4	(France) Circuit de Pau-Ville, Pau	13–14 May	Pau Grand Prix; French F4 Championship
3	5	Circuit de Spa-Francorchamps, Stavelot, Belgium	26–28 May	TCR World Tour; International GT Open; Euroformula Open Championship; Italian F4 Championship
3	6	Circuit de Spa-Francorchamps, Stavelot, Belgium	26–28 May	TCR World Tour; International GT Open; Euroformula Open Championship; Italian F4 Championship
4	7	Hungaroring, Budapest, Hungary	16–18 June	TCR World Tour; International GT Open; Euroformula Open Championship; Formula Regional European Championship
4	8	Hungaroring, Budapest, Hungary	16–18 June	TCR World Tour; International GT Open; Euroformula Open Championship; Formula Regional European Championship
5	9	Circuit Paul Ricard, Le Castellet, France	21–23 July	International GT Open; Euroformula Open Championship; Formula Regional European Championship; Italian F4 Championship
5	10	Circuit Paul Ricard, Le Castellet, France	21–23 July	International GT Open; Euroformula Open Championship; Formula Regional European Championship; Italian F4 Championship
6	11	Autodromo Nazionale Monza, Monza, Italy	22–24 September	International GT Open; Euroformula Open Championship
6	12	Autodromo Nazionale Monza, Monza, Italy	22–24 September	International GT Open; Euroformula Open Championship
7	13	Circuit de Barcelona-Catalunya, Montmeló, Spain	20–22 October	International GT Open; Euroformula Open Championship
7	14	Circuit de Barcelona-Catalunya, Montmeló, Spain	20–22 October	International GT Open; Euroformula Open Championship

== Teams and drivers ==
Team	Car	No.	Drivers	Class	Rounds
(Slovenia) Lema Racing	Audi RS 3 LMS TCR (2021)	3	(Italy) Giacomo Ghermandi	D	6
(Spain) Volcano Motorsport	Audi RS 3 LMS TCR (2021)	7	(Ukraine) Daniel Tkachenko	R	4–7
(Spain) Volcano Motorsport	Audi RS 3 LMS TCR (2021)	23	(United Kingdom) Isaac Smith	R	1–3
(Spain) Volcano Motorsport	Audi RS 3 LMS TCR (2021)	29	(Ukraine) Ivan Peklin	R	6
(Spain) Volcano Motorsport	Audi RS 3 LMS TCR (2021)	33	(Romania) Horia-Traian Chirigut	D	7
(Spain) Volcano Motorsport	Audi RS 3 LMS TCR (2021)	39	(United Kingdom) Lewis Brown		1–5
(Italy) Aggressive Team Italia	Hyundai Elantra N TCR	8	(Italy) Nicola Baldan	D	1
(Italy) Aggressive Team Italia	Hyundai Elantra N TCR	31	(Italy) Kevin Ceccon		4
(Italy) Aggressive Team Italia	Hyundai Elantra N TCR	48	(Sweden) Mikael Karlsson	D	1, 3–4
(Italy) Aggressive Team Italia	Hyundai Elantra N TCR	84	(Belgium) Giovanni Scamardi		6
(Italy) Aggressive Team Italia	Hyundai Elantra N TCR	264	(Hungary) Levente Losonczy		3–7
(Italy) Aggressive Team Italia	Hyundai Elantra N TCR	293	(Italy) Mauro Guastamacchia	D	7
(Belgium) Comtoyou Racing	Audi RS 3 LMS TCR (2021)	8	(Italy) Nicola Baldan	D	5–7
(Belgium) Comtoyou Racing	Audi RS 3 LMS TCR (2021)	11	(North Macedonia) Viktor Davidovski	D	All
(Belgium) Comtoyou Racing	Audi RS 3 LMS TCR (2021)	22	(Belgium) Kobe Pauwels	R	All
(Belgium) Comtoyou Racing	Audi RS 3 LMS TCR (2021)	27	(France) John Filippi		All
(Belgium) Comtoyou Racing	Audi RS 3 LMS TCR (2021)	34	(Netherlands) Tom Coronel	D	All
(Belgium) Comtoyou Racing	Audi RS 3 LMS TCR (2021)	39	(United Kingdom) Lewis Brown		6–7
(Belgium) Comtoyou Racing	Audi RS 3 LMS TCR (2021)	64	(France) Éric Cayrolle	D	2
(Belgium) Audi Sport Team Comtoyou	Audi RS 3 LMS TCR (2021)	122	(Belgium) Frédéric Vervisch	W	1, 3–4
(Belgium) Audi Sport Team Comtoyou	Audi RS 3 LMS TCR (2021)	179	(United Kingdom) Robert Huff	W	1, 3–4
(Sweden) MA:GP	Lynk & Co 03 TCR	10	(Sweden) Viktor Andersson	R	All
(Spain) RC2 Racing Team	Audi RS 3 LMS TCR (2021)	12	(Spain) Rubén Fernández	D	1, 3, 7
(Spain) RC2 Racing Team	Audi RS 3 LMS TCR (2021)	19	(Spain) Felipe Fernández	D	1, 3
(Spain) RC2 Racing Team	Audi RS 3 LMS TCR (2021)	74	(Spain) Pepe Oriola		7
(France) Espace Racing with CDRS	Audi RS 3 LMS TCR (2017)	17	(France) Christian Philippon	D	2
(Italy) Target Competition	Hyundai Elantra N TCR	18	(Italy) Marco Butti	R	5
(Italy) Target Competition	Hyundai Elantra N TCR	62	(Serbia) Dušan Borković	D	1–5, 7
(France) Cap Racing by CDRS	Cupra León TCR	40	(France) Julien Nougaret	G	2
(France) Cap Racing by CDRS	Cupra León TCR	41	(France) Dorian Duthil	G	2
(France) CDRS	Cupra León TCR	66	(France) Olivier López	D	2
(Italy) PMA Motorsport	Audi RS 3 LMS TCR (2021)	44	(Italy) Felice Jelmini		6
(France) Team Clairet Sport - Burson Auto Parts Racing	Peugeot 308 TCR	71	(Australia) Ben Bargwanna	R	1, 3
(France) SP Compétition	Cupra Leon Competición TCR	76	(France) Aurélien Comte		5
(France) SP Compétition	Cupra Leon Competición TCR	78	(France) Sacha Bottemanne		5
(Italy) BRC Hyundai N Squadra Corse	Hyundai Elantra N TCR	105	(Hungary) Norbert Michelisz	W	1, 3–4
(Italy) BRC Hyundai N Squadra Corse	Hyundai Elantra N TCR	196	(Spain) Mikel Azcona	W	1, 3–4
(Sweden) Cyan Racing Lynk & Co	Lynk & Co 03 FL TCR	111	(Sweden) Thed Björk	W	1, 3–4
(Sweden) Cyan Racing Lynk & Co	Lynk & Co 03 FL TCR	112	(Uruguay) Santiago Urrutia	W	1, 3–4
(Sweden) Cyan Racing Lynk & Co	Lynk & Co 03 FL TCR	155	(China) Ma Qing Hua	W	1, 3–4
(Sweden) Cyan Racing Lynk & Co	Lynk & Co 03 FL TCR	168	(France) Yann Ehrlacher	W	1, 3–4
(Estonia) ALM Motorsport	Honda Civic Type R TCR (FL5)	127	(Estonia) Ruben Volt	W	4
(Estonia) ALM Motorsport	Honda Civic Type R TCR (FL5)	127	(Estonia) Ruben Volt	R	5–7
(Estonia) ALM Motorsport	Honda Civic Type R TCR (FL5)	128	(Denmark) Philip Lindberg	W	3
(Estonia) ALM Motorsport	Honda Civic Type R TCR (FL5)	129	(Argentina) Néstor Girolami	W	1, 3–4

Icon	Class
R	Eligible for TCR Europe Rookie Trophy
D	Eligible for TCR Europe Diamond Trophy
W	Eligible for TCR World Tour
G	Guest drivers ineligible to score points

== Results and standings ==
=== Season summary ===
Rnd.		Circuit/Location	Pole position	Fastest lap	Winning driver	Winning team	Winning Rookie driver	Winning Diamond driver
1	1	(Portugal) Algarve International Circuit	(Netherlands) Tom Coronel (Note: Actual pole position was taken by TCR World Tour driver Norbert Michelisz.)	(Sweden) Viktor Andersson (Note: Actual fastest lap of the race was recorded by TCR World Tour driver Mikel Azcona.)	(France) John Filippi (Note: Actual victory in the race was taken by TCR World Tour driver Norbert Michelisz.)	(Belgium) Comtoyou Racing (Note: Actual victory in the race was taken by TCR World Tour team BRC Hyundai N Squadra Corse.)	(Belgium) Kobe Pauwels	(Netherlands) Tom Coronel
1	2	(Portugal) Algarve International Circuit		(Netherlands) Tom Coronel (Note: Actual fastest lap of the race was recorded by TCR World Tour driver Santiago Urrutia.)	(Netherlands) Tom Coronel (Note: Actual victory in the race was taken by TCR World Tour driver Santiago Urrutia.)	(Belgium) Comtoyou Racing (Note: Actual victory in the race was taken by TCR World Tour team Cyan Racing Lynk & Co.)	(Australia) Ben Bargwanna	(Netherlands) Tom Coronel
2	3	(France) Circuit de Pau-Ville	(Sweden) Viktor Andersson	(Serbia) Dušan Borković	(Serbia) Dušan Borković	(Italy) Target Competition	(Belgium) Kobe Pauwels	(Serbia) Dušan Borković
2	4	(France) Circuit de Pau-Ville		(Netherlands) Tom Coronel	(Netherlands) Tom Coronel	(Belgium) Comtoyou Racing	(Belgium) Kobe Pauwels	(Netherlands) Tom Coronel
3	5	(Belgium) Circuit de Spa-Francorchamps	(Belgium) Kobe Pauwels (Note: Actual pole position was taken by TCR World Tour driver Yann Ehrlacher.)	(Netherlands) Tom Coronel (Note: Actual fastest lap of the race was recorded by TCR World Tour driver Yann Ehrlacher.)	(Belgium) Kobe Pauwels (Note: Actual victory in the race was taken by TCR World Tour driver Yann Ehrlacher.)	(Belgium) Comtoyou Racing (Note: Actual victory in the race was taken by TCR World Tour team Cyan Racing Lynk & Co.)	(Belgium) Kobe Pauwels	(Netherlands) Tom Coronel
3	6	(Belgium) Circuit de Spa-Francorchamps		(Netherlands) Tom Coronel (Note: Actual fastest lap of the race was recorded by TCR World Tour driver Yann Ehrlacher.)	(France) John Filippi	(Belgium) Comtoyou Racing	(United Kingdom) Isaac Smith	(Netherlands) Tom Coronel
4	7	(Hungary) Hungaroring	(Sweden) Viktor Andersson (Note: Actual pole position was taken by TCR World Tour driver Yann Ehrlacher.)	(Netherlands) Tom Coronel (Note: Actual fastest lap of the race was recorded by TCR World Tour driver Néstor Girolami.)	(Belgium) Kobe Pauwels (Note: Actual victory in the race was taken by TCR World Tour driver Yann Ehrlacher.)	(Belgium) Comtoyou Racing (Note: Actual victory in the race was taken by TCR World Tour team Cyan Racing Lynk & Co.)	(Belgium) Kobe Pauwels	(Netherlands) Tom Coronel
4	8	(Hungary) Hungaroring		(Serbia) Dušan Borković (Note: Actual fastest lap of the race was recorded by TCR World Tour driver Mikel Azcona.)	(Belgium) Kobe Pauwels (Note: Actual victory in the race was taken by TCR World Tour driver Thed Björk.)	(Belgium) Comtoyou Racing (Note: Actual victory in the race was taken by TCR World Tour team Cyan Racing Lynk & Co.)	(Belgium) Kobe Pauwels	(Netherlands) Tom Coronel
5	9	(France) Circuit Paul Ricard	(France) John Filippi	(Netherlands) Tom Coronel	(France) John Filippi	(Belgium) Comtoyou Racing	(Belgium) Kobe Pauwels	(Italy) Nicola Baldan
5	10	(France) Circuit Paul Ricard		(Belgium) Kobe Pauwels	(Belgium) Kobe Pauwels	(Belgium) Comtoyou Racing	(Belgium) Kobe Pauwels	(Italy) Nicola Baldan
6	11	(Italy) Autodromo Nazionale Monza	(Estonia) Ruben Volt	(Estonia) Ruben Volt	(Belgium) Kobe Pauwels	(Belgium) Comtoyou Racing	(Belgium) Kobe Pauwels	(Italy) Nicola Baldan
6	12	(Italy) Autodromo Nazionale Monza		(Estonia) Ruben Volt	(Estonia) Ruben Volt	(Estonia) ALM Motorsport	(Estonia) Ruben Volt	(Italy) Nicola Baldan
7	13	(Spain) Circuit de Barcelona-Catalunya	(Netherlands) Tom Coronel	(Belgium) Kobe Pauwels	(Belgium) Kobe Pauwels	(Belgium) Comtoyou Racing	(Belgium) Kobe Pauwels	(Netherlands) Tom Coronel
7	14	(Spain) Circuit de Barcelona-Catalunya		(Estonia) Ruben Volt	(Estonia) Ruben Volt	(Estonia) ALM Motorsport	(Estonia) Ruben Volt	(Netherlands) Tom Coronel

== Championship standings ==
Scoring system

Position	1st	2nd	3rd	4th	5th	6th	7th	8th	9th	10th	11th	12th	13th	14th	15th
Qualifying	10	7	5	4	3	2	1	—N/a							
Races	40	35	30	27	24	21	18	15	13	11	9	7	5	3	1

=== Drivers' championship ===
Overall

Pos.	Driver	POR (Portugal)		PAU (France)		SPA (Belgium)		HUN (Hungary)		LEC (France)		MON (Italy)		BAR (Spain)		Pts.
1	(Netherlands) Tom Coronel	11^{1}	5	6	1	7^{2}	3	11^{3}	9	4^{2}	3	11	3	2^{1}	4	468
2	(France) John Filippi	9^{3}	9	7	3	10^{4}	1	14^{6}	14	1^{1}	6	5^{5}	5	3^{3}	2	441
3	(Belgium) Kobe Pauwels	10^{2}	Ret	2^{3}	4	4^{1}	Ret	10^{4}	7	3^{3}	1	1^{2}	6	1^{2}	DNS	433
4	(North Macedonia) Viktor Davidovski	13^{4}	19	4^{7}	7	11^{5}	16	13^{7}	Ret	7	7	3^{4}	8	8	12	266
5	(Sweden) Viktor Andersson	21^{6}†	14	Ret^{1}	5	17	22	20^{1}	13	10	11	8^{7}	4	5^{5}	3	247
6	(United Kingdom) Lewis Brown	19	16	8^{5}	6	12^{7}	11	17	16	8^{6}	8	6^{6}	9	11^{4}	6	247
7	(Italy) Nicola Baldan	16	15							2^{4}	2	2^{3}	2	4^{6}	5	235
8	(Serbia) Dušan Borković	12^{5}	Ret	1^{2}	2	Ret^{6}	15	15^{2}	12	WD	WD			WD	WD	190
9	(Estonia) Ruben Volt (Note: As he was a TCR World Tour entry, Volt was ineligible for points in round 4.)							21†	10	6^{7}	4	4^{1}	1	13	1	171
10	(United Kingdom) Isaac Smith	14	13	3^{4}	Ret	15	12									121
11	(Hungary) Levente Losonczy					19	21	18	Ret	9	12	10	10	9^{7}	8	104
12	(Spain) Rubén Fernández	18	11			18	18							10	9	91
13	(Spain) Felipe Fernández	15^{7}	18			13^{3}	6									86
14	(Sweden) Mikael Karlsson	20†	17			20	19	16	15							76
15	(Ukraine) Daniel Tkachenko							19	17	Ret	10	Ret	12	7	11	69
16	(Italy) Kevin Ceccon							12^{5}	11							63
17	(Australia) Ben Bargwanna	17	12			Ret	17									55
18	(France) Aurélien Comte									5^{5}	5					51
19	(Spain) Pepe Oriola													6	7	39
20	(France) Christian Philippon			10	9											28
21	(Belgium) Giovanni Scamardi											7	11			27
22	(France) Éric Cayrolle			5	Ret											26
23	(Italy) Felice Jelmini											Ret	7			18
24	(Italy) Mauro Guastamacchia													12	10	18
25	(Ukraine) Ivan Peklin											9	14			16
26	(France) Sacha Bottemanne									Ret	9					13
27	(France) Olivier López			11	Ret											11
28	(Italy) Giacomo Ghermandi											Ret	13			5
—	(Italy) Marco Butti									WD	WD					0
—	(Romania) Horia-Traian Chirigut													WD	WD	0
World Tour full-time entries ineligible for points
—	(France) Yann Ehrlacher	7	7			1	5	1	6							—
—	(Hungary) Norbert Michelisz	1	8			8	2	6	19							—
—	(Sweden) Thed Björk	8	2			9	9	8	1							—
—	(Uruguay) Santiago Urrutia	Ret	1			3	4	7	18							—
—	(Argentina) Néstor Girolami	5	Ret			2	7	2	5							—
—	(Spain) Mikel Azcona	2	4			16	8	3	4							—
—	(United Kingdom) Robert Huff	3	6			5	10	9	2							—
—	(Belgium) Frédéric Vervisch	4	3			6	14	5	3							—
—	(China) Ma Qing Hua	6	10			14	13	4	8							—
—	(Denmark) Philip Lindberg					21	20									—
Guest entries ineligible for points
—	(France) Dorian Duthil				8											—
—	(France) Julien Nougaret			9												—
Pos.	Driver	POR (Portugal)		PAU (France)		SPA (Belgium)		HUN (Hungary)		LEC (France)		MON (Italy)		BAR (Spain)		Pts.

Colour	Result
Gold	Winner
Silver	Second place
Bronze	Third place
Green	Points classification
Blue	Non-points classification
Blue	Non-classified finish (NC)
Purple	Retired, not classified (Ret)
Red	Did not qualify (DNQ)
Red	Did not pre-qualify (DNPQ)
Black	Disqualified (DSQ)
White	Did not start (DNS)
White	Withdrew (WD)
White	Race cancelled (C)
Blank	Did not practice (DNP)
Blank	Did not arrive (DNA)
Blank	Excluded (EX)

^{1} ^{2} ^{3} ^{4} ^{5} ^{6} ^{7} – Points-scoring position in qualifying, not including World Tour entries

† – Drivers did not finish the race, but were classified as they completed over 75% of the race distance.

Rookie Trophy

Pos.	Driver	POR (Portugal)		PAU (France)		SPA (Belgium)		HUN (Hungary)		LEC (France)		MON (Italy)		BAR (Spain)		Pts.
1	(Belgium) Kobe Pauwels	10^{1}	Ret	2^{2}	4	4^{1}	Ret	10^{2}	7	3^{1}	1	1^{2}	6	1^{1}	DNS	491
2	(Sweden) Viktor Andersson	21^{2}†	14	Ret^{1}	5	17^{4}	22	20^{1}	13	10^{3}	11	8^{3}	4	5^{2}	3	448
3	(Hungary) Levente Losonczy					19^{5}	21	18^{3}	Ret	9^{4}	12	10^{6}	10	9^{3}	8	273
4	(Estonia) Ruben Volt									6^{2}	4	4^{1}	1	13^{5}	1	229
5	(United Kingdom) Isaac Smith	14^{3}	13	3^{3}	Ret	15^{3}	12									195
6	(Ukraine) Daniel Tkachenko							19^{4}	17	Ret^{5}	10	Ret^{4}	12	7^{4}	11	186
7	(Australia) Ben Bargwanna	17^{4}	12			Ret^{2}	17									116
8	(Ukraine) Ivan Peklin											9^{5}	14			51
	(Italy) Marco Butti									WD	WD					—
Pos.	Driver	POR (Portugal)		PAU (France)		SPA (Belgium)		HUN (Hungary)		LEC (France)		MON (Italy)		BAR (Spain)		Pts.

Colour	Result
Gold	Winner
Silver	Second place
Bronze	Third place
Green	Points classification
Blue	Non-points classification
Blue	Non-classified finish (NC)
Purple	Retired, not classified (Ret)
Red	Did not qualify (DNQ)
Red	Did not pre-qualify (DNPQ)
Black	Disqualified (DSQ)
White	Did not start (DNS)
White	Withdrew (WD)
White	Race cancelled (C)
Blank	Did not practice (DNP)
Blank	Did not arrive (DNA)
Blank	Excluded (EX)

^{1} ^{2} ^{3} ^{4} ^{5} ^{6} ^{7} – Points-scoring position in qualifying, only counting Rookie drivers.

† – Drivers did not finish the race, but were classified as they completed over 75% of the race distance.

Diamond Trophy

Position	1st	2nd	3rd	4th	5th	6th	7th
Qualifying	—N/a						
Races	25	18	15	12	10	8	6

Pos.	Driver	POR (Portugal)		PAU (France)		SPA (Belgium)		HUN (Hungary)		LEC (France)		MON (Italy)		BAR (Spain)		Pts.
1	(Netherlands) Tom Coronel	11	5	6	1	7	3	11	9	4	3	11	3	2	4	306
2	(North Macedonia) Viktor Davidovski	13	19	4	7	11	16	13	Ret	7	7	3	8	8	12	192
3	(Italy) Nicola Baldan	16	15							2	2	2	2	4	5	161
4	(Serbia) Dušan Borković	12	Ret	1	2	Ret	15	15	12	WD	WD			WD	WD	109
5	(Spain) Rubén Fernández	18	11			18	18							10	9	75
6	(Sweden) Mikael Karlsson	20†	17			20	19	16	15							63
7	(Spain) Felipe Fernández	15	18			13	6									55
8	(France) Christian Philippon			10	9											22
9	(Italy) Mauro Guastamacchia													12	10	22
10	(France) Éric Cayrolle			5	Ret											15
11	(Italy) Giacomo Ghermandi											Ret	13			12
12	(France) Olivier López			11	Ret											8
Pos.	Driver	POR (Portugal)		PAU (France)		SPA (Belgium)		HUN (Hungary)		LEC (France)		MON (Italy)		BAR (Spain)		Pts.

Colour	Result
Gold	Winner
Silver	Second place
Bronze	Third place
Green	Points classification
Blue	Non-points classification
Blue	Non-classified finish (NC)
Purple	Retired, not classified (Ret)
Red	Did not qualify (DNQ)
Red	Did not pre-qualify (DNPQ)
Black	Disqualified (DSQ)
White	Did not start (DNS)
White	Withdrew (WD)
White	Race cancelled (C)
Blank	Did not practice (DNP)
Blank	Did not arrive (DNA)
Blank	Excluded (EX)

† – Drivers did not finish the race, but were classified as they completed over 75% of the race distance.

==== Teams' standings ====
Pos.	Team	Pts.
1	(Belgium) Comtoyou Racing	931
2	(Belgium) Comtoyou	758
3	(Spain) Volcano Motorsport	426
4	(Italy) Aggressive Team Italia	308
5	(Sweden) MA:GP	271
6	(Spain) RC2 Racing Team	232
7	(Italy) Target Competition	196
8	(Estonia) ALM Motorsport	185
9	(France) SP Compétition	73
10	(France) Team Clairet Sport - Burson Auto Parts Racing	55
11	(France) Espace Racing with CDRS	30
12	(Italy) PMA Motorsport	21
13	(France) Team CDRS	13
14	(Slovenia) Lema Racing	9
