= Levente Losonczy =

Hungarian racing driver (born 2003)

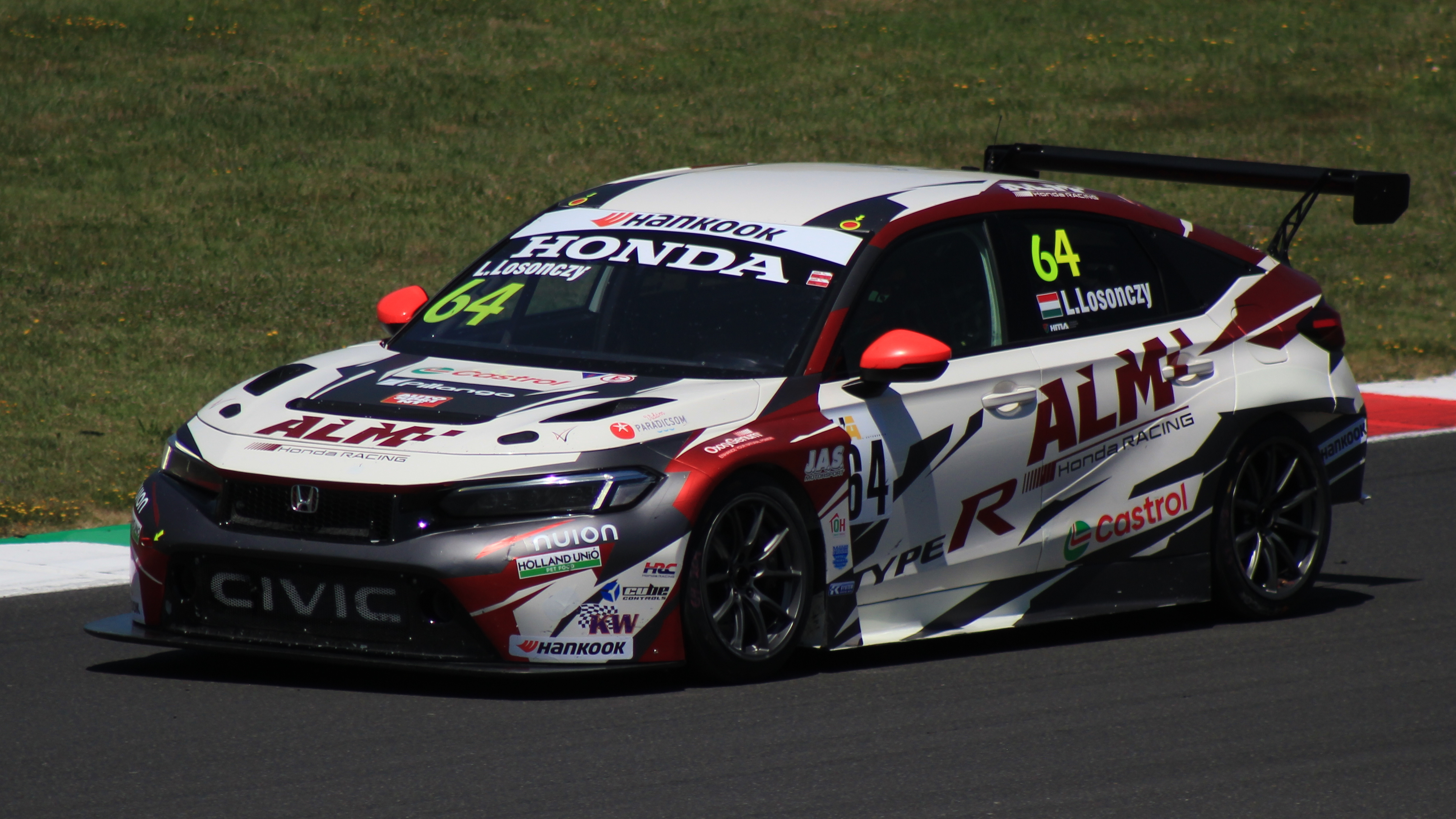
- Losonczy in 2024
- Born: Levente Losonczy; 7 February 2003 (age 23); Győr, Hungary
- Nationality: (Hungary) Hungarian

Levente Losonczy (born 7 February 2003) is a Hungarian racing driver who last competed for ALM Motorsport in TCR Europe and TCR Italy.

== Career ==
Losonczy made his car racing debut in 2019, racing in the Renault Clio Cup Eastern Europe for Z.S.P. Motorsport. After spending three years in Clio Cup competition, Losonczy switched to TCR competition in 2022, joining Zsille Motorsport to race in TCR Eastern Europe. Driving an Alfa Romeo Giulietta for the first three rounds, Losonczy took his first top-five on debut at the Hungaroring, before switching to Aggressive Team Italia for the round at the Slovakia Ring. In that round, Losonczy qualified third and finished sixth in both races.

After making his debut in TCR Europe and TCR Italy in late 2022, Losonczy with Aggressive Team Italia for 2023, racing with them in both TCR Europe and TCR Italy. In the former, Losonczy started off the season at Spa after missing the first two rounds, taking five top ten finishes in the final six races with a best result of eighth in the season-finale at Barcelona to end the season 19th in points. Whereas in the Italian series, Losonczy took his only podium of the series in the season-opening round at Imola, and an Under-25 class win at Vallelunga which helped him end the year 13th in the overall standings and third in the Under-25 points.

For his second full-time season in TCR competition, Losonczy switched to ALM Motorsport, as he remained in both TCR Europe and TCR Italy as a member of the JAS Development Programme. In the former, Losonczy took his maiden series win at Zolder, before repeating the same feat two rounds later at Brno, a race held with the TCR Eastern Europe Trophy, as he secured sixth in the overall standings. In the Italian series, Losonczy took his only win of the season at Vallelunga, as he ended the year tenth in points despite missing the round at Imola.

Despite testing GT3 machinery in late 2024, Losonczy elected to return to ALM Motorsport to race in TCR Europe in 2025, but ultimately didn't compete in any of the rounds.

== Karting record ==
=== Karting career summary ===
Season	Series	Team	Position
2016	Rotax Max Challenge Central-Eastern Europe – Mini Max		11th
2016	Hungarian International Open Championship – Mini Max	SWA	11th
2016	Euro Finale – Mini Max		7th
2017	Rotax Max Wintercup – Junior Max	KMS Europe	21st
2017	Hungarian International Open Championship – Junior	KMS Europe	6th
2017	BNL Golden Trophy – Junior Max		30th
2018	Hungarian International Open Championship – Junior	MHH Kart Team	21st
2018	Italian Karting Championship – Junior Rok	MHH Kart Team	NC

== Racing record ==
=== Racing career summary ===
Season	Series	Team	Races	Wins	Poles	F/Laps	Podiums	Points	Position
2019	Renault Clio Cup Central Europe	Z.S.P. Motorsport KFT	4	0	0	0	0	21	25th
2020	D4TWC - CEZ Circuit	Z.S.P. Motorsport KFT	11	0	0	0	1	73	9th
2021	D4TWC - CEZ Circuit	Z.S.P. Motorsport KFT	7	5	0	0	7	137	**1st**
2021	ESET V4 Cup – Clio Cup	Z.S.P. Motorsport KFT	6						
2022	TCR Eastern Europe Trophy	Zsille Motorsport	4	0	0	0	0	35	11th
2022	TCR Eastern Europe Trophy	Aggressive Team Italia	2	0	0	0	0	35	11th
2022	TCR Italy Touring Car Championship	Aggressive Team Italia	4	0	0	0	0	1	NC
2022	TCR Europe Touring Car Series	Aggressive Team Italia	1	0	0	0	0	0	37th
2023	TCR Italy Touring Car Championship	Aggressive Team Italia	14	0	0	0	1	98	13th
2023	TCR Europe Touring Car Series	Aggressive Team Italia	10	0	0	0	0	104	11th
2023	TCR World Tour	Aggressive Team Italia	4	0	0	0	0	0	64th
2024	TCR Italy Touring Car Championship	ALM Motorsport	12	1	0	0	1	160	10th
2024	TCR Europe Touring Car Series	ALM Motorsport	12	2	0	1	4	246	6th
2024	TCR Eastern Europe Trophy	ALM Motorsport	2	1	0	0	1	0	NC
2024	TCR Spain	ALM Motorsport	2	0	0	0	0	17	23rd

=== Complete TCR Europe Touring Car Series results ===
(key) (Races in bold indicate pole position) (Races in italics indicate fastest lap)

Year	Team	Car	1	2	3	4	5	6	7	8	9	10	11	12	13	14	DC	Points
2022	Aggressive Team Italia	Hyundai Elantra N TCR	ALG; 1	ALG; 2	LEC; 1	LEC; 2	SPA; 1	SPA; 2	NOR; 1	NOR; 2	NÜR; 1	NÜR; 2	MNZ; 1 Ret	MNZ; 2 DNS	CAT; 1	CAT; 2	37th	0
2023	Aggressive Team Italia	Hyundai Elantra N TCR	ALG; 1	ALG; 2	PAU; 1	PAU; 2	SPA; 1; 19	SPA; 2; 21	HUN; 1; 18	HUN; 2 Ret	LEC; 1; 9	LEC; 2; 12	MNZ; 1; 10	MNZ; 2; 10	CAT; 1; 9^{8}	CAT; 2; 8	11th	104
2024	ALM Motorsport	Honda Civic Type R TCR (FL5)	VAL; 1; 10	VAL; 2; 8	ZOL; 1; 10	ZOL; 2; 1	SAL; 1; 5^{7}	SAL; 2; 2	SPA; 1; 11	SPA; 2; 3	BRN; 1; 14^{7}	BRN; 2; 1	CRT; 1; 7	CRT; 2; 13			6th	246

^{†} Driver did not finish, but was classified as he completed over 75% of the race distance.

=== Complete TCR World Tour results ===
(key) (Races in bold indicate pole position) (Races in italics indicate fastest lap)

Year	Team	Car	1	2	3	4	5	6	7	8	9	10	11	12	13	14	15	16	17	18	19	20	DC	Points
2023	Aggressive Team Italia	Hyundai Elantra N TCR	ALG; 1	ALG; 2	SPA; 1; 19	SPA; 2; 21	VAL; 1	VAL; 2	HUN; 1; 18	HUN; 2 Ret	ELP; 1	ELP; 2	VIL; 1	VIL; 2	SYD; 1	SYD; 2	SYD; 3	BAT; 1	BAT; 2	BAT; 3	MAC; 1	MAC; 2	64th	0
