= 2024 TCR Italy Touring Car Championship =

Touring car season

The 2024 TCR Italy Touring Car Championship was the ninth season of the ITCC to run under TCR regulations and the 38th season since the national touring car series was revived in 1987 as the Campionato Italiano Turismo.

== Calendar ==
The schedule for 2024 was announced on 8 November 2023 containing 12 races across 6 rounds.

Race is part of TCR World Tour

Rnd.	Circuit	Location	Date	Supporting
NC	(Italy) Vallelunga Circuit	Campagnano di Roma, Lazio	19–21 April	TCR World Tour; TCR Europe Series
1	(Italy) Misano World Circuit Marco Simoncelli	Misano Adriatico, Emilia-Romagna	3–5 May	2024 TCR Italy DSG
2	(Italy) Autodromo di Pergusa	Enna, Sicily	7–9 June	2024 TCR Italy DSG
3	(Italy) Autodromo del Mugello	Scarperia e San Piero, Tuscany	12–14 July	2024 TCR Italy DSG
4	(Italy) Imola Circuit	Imola, Emilia-Romagna	6–8 September	2024 TCR Italy DSG
5	(Italy) Vallelunga Circuit	Campagnano di Roma, Lazio	20–22 September	2024 TCR Italy DSG
6	(Italy) Autodromo Nazionale di Monza	Monza, Lombardy	25–27 October	2024 TCR Italy DSG

== Teams and drivers ==
Team	Car	No.	Drivers	Class	Rounds	Ref.
(Italy) PMA Motorsport	Audi RS 3 LMS TCR (2021)	1	(Italy) Sandro Pelatti		NC	
(Italy) PMA Motorsport	Audi RS 3 LMS TCR (2021)	72	(Italy) Sandro Pelatti	M	1-6	
(Italy) PMA Motorsport	Audi RS 3 LMS TCR (2021)	17	(Canada) Nicolas Taylor	U25	1-6	
(Italy) Luigi Fazzino	Audi RS 3 LMS TCR (2021)	2	(Italy) Luigi Fazzino		5	
(Italy) Scuderia del Girasole CUPRA Racing	Cupra León VZ TCR	3	(Italy) Raffaele Gurrieri	M	1-6	
(Italy) Scuderia del Girasole CUPRA Racing	Cupra León VZ TCR	4	(Italy) Salvatore Tavano		1-6	
(Italy) GRT Motorsport	Audi RS 3 LMS TCR (2017)	4	(Italy) Giulio Valentini		NC	
(Italy) Aikoa Racing	Audi RS 3 LMS TCR (2021)	5	(Turkey) Demir Eröge		NC	
(Italy) Aikoa Racing	Audi RS 3 LMS TCR (2021)	8	(Italy) Nicola Baldan	M	1-6	
(Italy) Aikoa Racing	Audi RS 3 LMS TCR (2021)	15	(Italy) Filippo Barberi		NC	
(Italy) Aikoa Racing	Audi RS 3 LMS TCR (2021)	38	(Italy) Filippo Barberi	U25	1–6	
(Italy) NOS Racing	Cupra León VZ TCR	5	(Italy) Cosimo Barberini		1-6	
(Italy) Target Competition	Hyundai Elantra N TCR	7	(South Korea) Kim Hwarang	U25	1–3	
(Italy) Target Competition	Hyundai Elantra N TCR	24	(Switzerland) Antonio Citera	M	6	
(Italy) Target Competition	Hyundai Elantra N TCR	76	(United Kingdom) Alex Ley	U25	1-6	
(Italy) Target Competition	Hyundai Elantra N TCR (2024)	10	(Italy) Federico Paolino		2–6	
(Italy) Gearworks Racelab	Audi RS 3 LMS TCR (2021)	9	(Italy) Matteo Poloni		1-6	
(Estonia) ALM Motorsport	Honda Civic Type R TCR (FL5)	11	(Italy) Paolo Rocca	U25	1-6	
(Estonia) ALM Motorsport	Honda Civic Type R TCR (FL5)	27	(Estonia) Ruben Volt	U25	1-6	
(Estonia) ALM Motorsport	Honda Civic Type R TCR (FL5)	64	(Hungary) Levente Losonczy	U25	1–3, 5-6	
(Italy) BRC Hyundai N Squadra Corse	Hyundai Elantra N TCR	12	(Italy) Gabriele Covini	U25	1-6	
(Italy) BRC Hyundai N Squadra Corse	Hyundai Elantra N TCR (2024)	105	(Hungary) Norbert Michelisz	W	NC	
(Italy) BRC Hyundai N Squadra Corse	Hyundai Elantra N TCR (2024)	129	(Argentina) Néstor Girolami	W	NC	
(Italy) BRC Hyundai N Squadra Corse	Hyundai Elantra N TCR (2024)	196	(Spain) Mikel Azcona	W	NC	
(France) Team Clairet Sport	Audi RS 3 LMS TCR (2021)	20	(France) Teddy Clairet		6	
(Germany) Schafer Motorsport	Volkswagen Golf GTI TCR	22	(Germany) Stefan Schafer		4	
(Austria) RTM Motorsport	Honda Civic Type R TCR (FK8)	24	(Switzerland) Antonio Citera	M	1, 3–4	
(Italy) MM Motorsport	Honda Civic Type R TCR (FL5)	33	(Italy) Giacomo Ghermandi		6	
(Italy) MM Motorsport	Honda Civic Type R TCR (FL5)	67	(Italy) Marco Pellegrini	M	4–6	
(Italy) MM Motorsport	Honda Civic Type R TCR (FL5)	82	(Italy) Jacopo Giuseppe Cimenes	U25	All	
(Italy) MM Motorsport	Honda Civic Type R TCR (FL5)	91	(Argentina) Luciano Martínez	U25	4–6	
(Italy) MM Motorsport	Honda Civic Type R TCR (FK8)	39	(Netherlands) Tony Verhulst		NC	
(Italy) MM Motorsport	Honda Civic Type R TCR (FK8)	53	(Italy) Edoardo Cappello		2	
(Italy) MM Motorsport	Honda Civic Type R TCR (FK8)	77	(Italy) Federico Danova	U25	1	
(Italy) BF Motorsport	Audi RS 3 LMS TCR (2021)	34	(Turkey) Ramazan Kaya		NC	
(Italy) BF Motorsport	Audi RS 3 LMS TCR (2021)	95	(Italy) Pietro Alessi	U25	3–6	
(United Kingdom) Fox Racing with BF Motorsport	Audi RS 3 LMS TCR (2021)	69	(Italy) Tommaso Fossati	U25	1-6	
(Spain) Auto Club RC2 Valles	Audi RS 3 LMS TCR (2021)	41	(Spain) Victor Fernández		NC	
(Italy) CRM Motorsport	Hyundai Elantra N TCR	44	(Italy) Michele Imberti		1-6	
(Italy) Pinetti Motorsport	Audi RS 3 LMS TCR (2021)	67	(Italy) Marco Pellegrini	M	1–3	
(Italy) Pinetti Motorsport	Audi RS 3 LMS TCR (2021)	91	(Argentina) Luciano Martínez	U25	1–3	
(Austria) Duller Motorsport	Opel Astra TCR	77	(Austria) Philipp Mattersdorfer		NC	
(Italy) Trico WRT	Hyundai Elantra N TCR	81	(Italy) Damiano Reduzzi	M	1-6	
(South Korea) Solite Indigo Racing	Hyundai Elantra N TCR (2024)	87	(South Korea) Park Jun-ui	U25	1-6	
(South Korea) Solite Indigo Racing	Hyundai Elantra N TCR	97	(South Korea) Park June-sung		1-6	
(Italy) Planet Motorsport	Audi RS 3 LMS TCR (2021)	90	(Italy) Denis Babuin	M	1-6	
(Sweden) Cyan Racing Lynk & Co	Lynk & Co 03 FL TCR	111	(Sweden) Thed Björk	W	NC	
(Sweden) Cyan Racing Lynk & Co	Lynk & Co 03 FL TCR	112	(Uruguay) Santiago Urrutia	W	NC	
(Sweden) Cyan Racing Lynk & Co	Lynk & Co 03 FL TCR	155	(China) Ma Qing Hua	W	NC	
(Sweden) Cyan Racing Lynk & Co	Lynk & Co 03 FL TCR	168	(France) Yann Ehrlacher	W	NC	
(Spain) Volcano Motorsport	Audi RS 3 LMS TCR (2021)	127	(France) John Filippi	W	NC	
(Spain) Volcano Motorsport	Audi RS 3 LMS TCR (2021)	212	(Morocco) Sami Taoufik	W	NC	
(Spain) GOAT Racing	Honda Civic Type R TCR (FL5)	186	(Argentina) Esteban Guerrieri	W	NC	
(Spain) GOAT Racing	Honda Civic Type R TCR (FL5)	199	(Italy) Marco Butti	W	NC	

Icon	Class
U25	Eligible for TCR Italy Under 25 Trophy
M	Eligible for TCR Italy Master Trophy
W	TCR World Tour entries not eligible to score points in the local series

=== TCR Italy DSG ===
Team	Car	No.	Drivers	Rounds	Ref.
(Italy) Pro Race	Cupra León TCR	102	(Italy) Giorgio Fantilli	1–5	
(Italy) Pro Race	Cupra León TCR	115	(Italy) Gabriele Foglia	3-6	
(Italy) Pro Race	Cupra León TCR	129	(Italy) Emilio Damante	1–3	
(Italy) Pro Race	Cupra León TCR	178	(Italy) Alessandro Berton	All	
(Italy) Pro Race	Cupra León TCR	182	(Italy) Davide Nardilli	6	
(Italy) Pro Race	Cupra León TCR	184	(Switzerland) Mattia Lancellotti	1–5	
(Italy) Pro Race	Cupra León TCR	185	(Italy) Alessandro Lisi	1–4	
(Italy) NOS Racing	Volkswagen Golf GTI TCR	105	(Italy) Fabio Bagnoli	1, 4	
(Italy) NOS Racing	Volkswagen Golf GTI TCR	108	(Italy) Ezio Muccio	2	
(Italy) Progetto E20 Motorsport	Audi RS 3 LMS TCR (2017)	107	(Italy) Angelo Marino	1–3	
(Italy) Progetto E20 Motorsport	Audi RS 3 LMS TCR (2017)	131	(Italy) Paolo Maria Silvestrini	All	
(Italy) Progetto E20 Motorsport	Volkswagen Golf GTI TCR	161	(Italy) Federico Desiderio	3, 5-6	
(Italy) Progetto E20 Motorsport	Volkswagen Golf GTI TCR	183	(Italy) Diego Cassarà	4	
(Italy) RPM Performance Motorsport	Cupra León TCR	111	(Italy) Matteo Roccadelli	All	
(Italy) Aikoa Racing	Audi RS 3 LMS TCR (2017)	119	(Italy) Paolo Palanti	All	
(Italy) Aikoa Racing	Audi RS 3 LMS TCR (2017)	127	(Italy) Andrea Palazzo	6	
(Italy) Aikoa Racing	Audi RS 3 LMS TCR (2017)	155	(Turkey) Temel Camlidag	3	
(Italy) Aikoa Racing	Audi RS 3 LMS TCR (2017)	191	(Italy) Luca Franca	All	
(Italy) Aikoa Racing	Audi RS 3 LMS TCR (2017)	199	(Italy) Filippo Maria Zanin	4	
(Italy) RC Motorsport	Cupra León TCR	123	(Italy) Fabio Antonello	1–5	
(Italy) RC Motorsport	Audi RS 3 LMS TCR (2017)	127	(Italy) Andrea Palazzo	3	
(Italy) RC Motorsport	Audi RS 3 LMS TCR (2017)	192	(Italy) Carlotta Fedeli	5	
(Italy) RC Motorsport	Audi RS 3 LMS TCR (2017)	195	(Italy) Pietro Alessi	1	
(Italy) AC Racing Technology	Audi RS 3 LMS TCR (2017)	127	(Italy) Andrea Palazzo	5	
(Italy) Brothers in Arms	Cupra León TCR	129	(Italy) Emilio Damante	4	
(Italy) Brothers in Arms	Cupra León TCR	167	(Italy) Andrea Fazioli	All	
(Italy) Brothers in Arms	Cupra León TCR	168	(Italy) Andrea Argenti	1–2, 5	
(Italy) Planet Motorsport	Audi RS 3 LMS TCR (2017)	139	(Italy) Luca Verdi	All	
(Italy) Event e Service	Cupra León TCR	144	(Italy) Federico Scionti	3, 5	
(Italy) Tuder Motorsport	Volkswagen Golf GTI TCR	174	(Italy) Alessandro Alcidi	All	

== Results and standings ==
Rnd.		Circuit	Date	Pole position	Fastest lap	Winning driver	Winning team	Winning U25 driver	Winning Master driver	DSG Winning Driver	DSG Winning Team
NC	1	ACI Vallelunga Circuit, Campagnano di Roma	19–21 April	(Hungary) Norbert Michelisz	(Argentina) Esteban Guerrieri	(Hungary) Norbert Michelisz	(Italy) BRC Hyundai N Squadra Corse	not held	not held	not held	not held
NC	2	ACI Vallelunga Circuit, Campagnano di Roma	19–21 April		(Argentina) Néstor Girolami	(Argentina) Néstor Girolami	(Italy) BRC Hyundai N Squadra Corse	not held	not held	not held	not held
1	3	Misano World Circuit Marco Simoncelli, Misano Adriatico	5–7 May	(United Kingdom) Alex Ley	(United Kingdom) Alex Ley	(United Kingdom) Alex Ley	(Italy) Target Competition	(South Korea) Park Jun-ui	(Italy) Denis Babuin	(Italy) Matteo Roccadelli	(Italy) RPM Performance Motorsport
1	4	Misano World Circuit Marco Simoncelli, Misano Adriatico	5–7 May		(South Korea) Park Jun-ui	(South Korea) Park Jun-ui	(South Korea) Solite Indigo Racing	(South Korea) Park Jun-ui	(Italy) Marco Pellegrini	(Italy) Alessandro Alcidi	(Italy) Tuder Motorsport
2	5	Autodromo di Pergusa, Enna	7–9 June	(Italy) Salvatore Tavano	(South Korea) Park June-sung	(Italy) Nicola Baldan	(Italy) Aikoa Racing	(Canada) Nicolas Taylor	(Italy) Nicola Baldan	(Italy) Luca Verdi	(Italy) Planet Motorsport
2	6	Autodromo di Pergusa, Enna	7–9 June		(South Korea) Park Jun-ui	(Estonia) Ruben Volt	(Estonia) ALM Motorsport	(Estonia) Ruben Volt	(Italy) Damiano Reduzzi	(Italy) Paolo Maria Silvestrini	(Italy) Progetto E20 Motorsport
3	7	Mugello Circuit, Scarperia	12–14 July	(South Korea) Kim Hwarang	(Italy) Paolo Rocca	(Italy) Paolo Rocca	(Estonia) ALM Motorsport	(Italy) Paolo Rocca	(Italy) Nicola Baldan	(Italy) Federico Scionti	(Italy) Event e Service
3	8	Mugello Circuit, Scarperia	12–14 July		(South Korea) Park June-sung	(South Korea) Park June-sung	(South Korea) Solite Indigo Racing	(Canada) Nicolas Taylor	(Italy) Nicola Baldan	(Italy) Federico Scionti	(Italy) Event e Service
4	9	Autodromo Enzo e Dino Ferrari, Imola	6–8 September	(Italy) Matteo Poloni	(Estonia) Ruben Volt	(Estonia) Ruben Volt	(Estonia) ALM Motorsport	(Estonia) Ruben Volt	(Italy) Nicola Baldan	(Italy) Luca Franca	(Italy) Aikoa Racing
4	10	Autodromo Enzo e Dino Ferrari, Imola	6–8 September		(Canada) Nicolas Taylor	(Italy) Nicola Baldan	(Italy) Aikoa Racing	(United Kingdom) Alex Ley	(Italy) Nicola Baldan	(Italy) Alessandro Alcidi	(Italy) Tuder Motorsport
5	11	ACI Vallelunga Circuit, Campagnano di Roma	20–22 September	(Canada) Nicolas Taylor	(Canada) Nicolas Taylor	(Canada) Nicolas Taylor	(Italy) PMA Motorsport	(Canada) Nicolas Taylor	(Italy) Nicola Baldan	(Italy) Federico Scionti	(Italy) Event e Service
5	12	ACI Vallelunga Circuit, Campagnano di Roma	20–22 September		(Italy) Matteo Poloni	(Hungary) Levente Losonczy	(Estonia) ALM Motorsport	(Hungary) Levente Losonczy	(Italy) Nicola Baldan	(Italy) Luca Franca	(Italy) Aikoa Racing
6	13	Autodromo Nazionale Monza, Monza	25–27 October	(Canada) Nicolas Taylor	(France) Teddy Clairet	(Canada) Nicolas Taylor	(Italy) PMA Motorsport	(Canada) Nicolas Taylor	(Italy) Damiano Reduzzi	(Italy) Matteo Roccadelli	(Italy) RPM Performance Motorsport
6	14	Autodromo Nazionale Monza, Monza	25–27 October		(France) Teddy Clairet	(France) Teddy Clairet	(France) Team Clairet Sport	(Italy) Paolo Rocca	(Italy) Denis Babuin	(Italy) Matteo Roccadelli	(Italy) RPM Performance Motorsport

Scoring system

Position	1st	2nd	3rd	4th	5th	6th	7th	8th	9th	10th	11th	12th	13th	14th	15th
Qualifying	15	14	13	12	11	10	9	8	7	6	5	4	3	2	1
Races	40	35	30	27	24	21	18	15	13	11	9	7	5	3	1

=== Drivers' championship ===
The joint round with TCR World Tour at Vallelunga did not count for the championship.

==== Overall ====
Pos.	Driver	MIS		PER		MUG		IMO		VAL		MON		Pts.
Pos.	Driver	RD1	RD2	RD1	RD2	RD1	RD2	RD1	RD2	RD1	RD2	RD1	RD2	Pts.
1	(Canada) Nicolas Taylor	6^{2}	13	2^{2}	4	Ret^{5}	3	5^{4}	7	1^{1}	7	1^{1}	7	352
2	(Estonia) Ruben Volt	18^{5}	7	3^{8}	1	3^{3}	Ret	1^{2}	3	4^{3}	4	4^{5}	9	352
3	(Italy) Nicola Baldan	20†^{4}	2	1^{7}	Ret	2^{7}	2	7^{7}	1	2^{4}	3	8^{6}	21	344
4	(Italy) Salvatore Tavano	2^{6}	5	4^{1}	2	9	9	6^{10}	5	10	9	3^{3}	3	296
5	(South Korea) Park June-sung	16^{11}	22	7^{6}	Ret	5^{8}	1	3^{6}	22	3^{5}	5	7^{7}	2	272
6	(Italy) Michele Imberti	13^{10}	3	5^{4}	3	Ret^{15}	7	8	8	9^{14}	Ret	9^{8}	5	216
7	(South Korea) Park Jun-ui	3^{7}	1	8^{10}	12	17^{12}	11	15^{11}	11	15^{6}	2	19^{13}	18	184
8	(United Kingdom) Alex Ley	1^{1}	4	23†^{5}	13	15^{10}	Ret	23^{5}	2	22^{12}	Ret	6^{9}	Ret	183
9	(Italy) Paolo Rocca	Ret^{9}	Ret	22†^{11}	5	1^{2}	8	Ret^{9}	21	21^{2}	Ret	10^{11}	6	163
10	(Hungary) Levente Losonczy	14^{13}	8	10	8	Ret^{6}	4			5^{7}	1	14	22	160
11	(Italy) Matteo Poloni	5	15	6^{3}	Ret	19†	5	2^{1}	Ret	23^{8}	17	13^{12}	12	157
12	(Italy) Jacopo Cimenes	15^{8}	6	12^{12}	DNS	6^{4}	13	4^{3}	4	11^{15}	19	17	15	157
13	(Italy) Denis Babuin	7^{12}	12	15	DNS	18^{13}	10	10^{14}	6	12	10	21	8	111
14	(Italy) Damiano Reduzzi	Ret	14	13^{14}	9	Ret^{11}	Ret	9^{13}	10	13	11	5^{2}	Ret	107
15	(Italy) Gabriele Covini	Ret	16	14	Ret	10^{9}	Ret	12^{8}	9	8^{9}	20	15^{10}	13	83
16	(Italy) Filippo Barberi	12^{14}	11	11^{15}	6	7	14	13	13	24^{13}	16	Ret	17	83
17	(Italy) Sandro Pelatti	8^{15}	17	20	11	8	18	11^{15}	12	18	8	23	Ret	72
18	(Italy) Cosimo Barberini	19†	10	Ret	Ret	13	Ret	17	14	6^{11}	18	18^{14}	Ret	47
19	(Italy) Marco Pellegrini	Ret	9	Ret	Ret	12	20†	14	16	Ret	14	12	10	44
20	(Italy) Federico Paolino			16	7	11	12	20	17	19	13	22	16	39
21	(Argentina) Luciano Martínez	10	Ret	21†	DNS	Ret	DNS	16	Ret	20	6	16^{15}	23	33
22	(Italy) Raffaele Gurrieri	11	21	18	10	16	16	19	18	16	15	26	14	24
23	(Italy) Tommaso Fossati	Ret	18	19^{13}	DNS	20†	15	18	15	17	12	25	19	12
24	(Switzerland) Antonio Citera	17	20			14	19	21	20			20	20	3
Not classified (Note: Under Article 25 of the Regulations, in order to participate in the final rankings of the Championship, each driver must have carried out at least five events.)
-	(South Korea) Kim Hwarang	4^{3}	23†	9^{9}	Ret	4^{1}	17							102
-	(France) Teddy Clairet											2^{4}	1	87
-	(Italy) Pietro Alessi					21†^{14}	6	Ret^{12}	Ret	14	Ret	24	11	39
-	(Italy) Giacomo Ghermandi											11	4	36
-	(Italy) Luigi Fazzino									7^{10}	Ret			24
-	(Italy) Federico Danova	9	19											13
-	(Italy) Edoardo Cappello			17	Ret									0
-	(Germany) Stefan Schäfer							22	19					0
Pos.	Driver	MIS		PER		MUG		IMO		VAL		MON		Pts.

Colour	Result
Gold	Winner
Silver	Second place
Bronze	Third place
Green	Points classification
Blue	Non-points classification
Blue	Non-classified finish (NC)
Purple	Retired, not classified (Ret)
Red	Did not qualify (DNQ)
Red	Did not pre-qualify (DNPQ)
Black	Disqualified (DSQ)
White	Did not start (DNS)
White	Withdrew (WD)
White	Race cancelled (C)
Blank	Did not practice (DNP)
Blank	Did not arrive (DNA)
Blank	Excluded (EX)

† – Drivers did not finish the race, but were classified.

==== Under 25 Trophy ====
Pos.	Driver	MIS		PER		MUG		IMO		VAL		MON		Pts.
Pos.	Driver	RD1	RD2	RD1	RD2	RD1	RD2	RD1	RD2	RD1	RD2	RD1	RD2	Pts.
1	(Estonia) Ruben Volt	18	7	3	1	3	Ret	1	3	4	4	4	9	342
2	(Canada) Nicolas Taylor	6	13	2	4	Ret	3	5	7	1	7	1	7	338
3	(South Korea) Park Jun-ui	3	1	8	12	17	11	15	11	15	2	19	18	257
4	(Italy) Jacopo Cimenes	15	6	12	DNS	6	13	4	4	11	19	17	15	233
5	(Hungary) Levente Losonczy	14	8	10	8	Ret	4			5	1	14	22	227
6	(United Kingdom) Alex Ley	1	4	23†	13	15	Ret	23	2	22	Ret	6	Ret	208
7	(Italy) Filippo Barberi	12	11	11	6	7	14	13	13	24	16	Ret	17	207
8	(Italy) Paolo Rocca	Ret	Ret	22†	5	1	8	Ret	21	21	Ret	10	6	195
9	(Italy) Gabriele Covini	Ret	16	14	Ret	10	Ret	12	9	8	20	15	13	184
10	(Italy) Tommaso Fossati	Ret	18	19	DNS	20†	15	18	15	17	12	25	19	140
11	(Argentina) Luciano Martínez	10	Ret	21†	DNS	Ret	DNS	16	Ret	20	6	16	23	115
12	(South Korea) Kim Hwarang	4	23†	9	Ret	4	17							109
13	(Italy) Pietro Alessi					21†	6	Ret	Ret	14	Ret	24	11	97
14	(Italy) Federico Danova	9	19											35
15	(Italy) Luigi Fazzino									7	Ret			27
Pos.	Driver	MIS		PER		MUG		IMO		VAL		MON		Pts.

==== Masters Trophy ====
Pos.	Driver	MIS		PER		MUG		IMO		VAL		MON		Pts.
Pos.	Driver	RD1	RD2	RD1	RD2	RD1	RD2	RD1	RD2	RD1	RD2	RD1	RD2	Pts.
1	(Italy) Nicola Baldan	20†	2	1	Ret	2	2	7	1	2	3	8	21	379
2	(Italy) Denis Babuin	7	12	15	DNS	18	10	10	6	12	10	21	8	329
3	(Italy) Sandro Pelatti	8	17	20	11	8	18	11	12	18	8	23	Ret	285
4	(Italy) Damiano Reduzzi	Ret	14	13	9	Ret	Ret	9	10	13	11	5	Ret	264
5	(Italy) Raffaele Gurrieri	11	21	18	10	16	16	19	18	16	15	26	14	263
6	(Italy) Marco Pellegrini	Ret	9	Ret	Ret	12	20†	14	16	Ret	14	12	10	223
7	(Switzerland) Antonio Citera	17	20			14	19	21	20			20	20	189
8	(Italy) Edoardo Cappello			17	Ret									27
Pos.	Driver	MIS		PER		MUG		IMO		VAL		MON		Pts.

==== TCR Italy DSG ====
Pos.	Driver	MIS		PER		MUG		IMO		VAL		MON		Pts.
Pos.	Driver	RD1	RD2	RD1	RD2	RD1	RD2	RD1	RD2	RD1	RD2	RD1	RD2	Pts.
1	(Italy) Luca Franca	2^{2}	2	11^{2}	2	2^{1}	3	1^{1}	12	3^{2}	1	2^{4}	4	426
2	(Italy) Luca Verdi	Ret^{1}	8	1^{1}	4	3^{4}	6	3^{3}	2	4^{6}	4	3^{2}	2	381
3	(Italy) Matteo Roccadelli	1^{3}	11	Ret^{5}	14	3^{2}	2	2^{7}	Ret	2^{3}	2	1^{1}	1	377
4	(Italy) Alessandro Alcidi	3^{6}	1	2^{3}	5	Ret^{5}	7	6^{5}	1	8^{5}	7	4^{11}	5	338
5	(Italy) Paolo Maria Silvestrini	8^{8}	5	3^{7}	1	7^{9}	9	4^{6}	Ret	6^{4}	6	6^{6}	7	291
6	(Switzerland) Mattia Lancellotti	15^{4}	3	4^{4}	Ret	4^{7}	4	5^{2}	3	5^{7}	Ret			246
7	(Italy) Alessandro Berton	6^{11}	Ret	6^{10}	8	8	8	11^{14}	7	11^{12}	9	9^{3}	8	185
8	(Italy) Federico Scionti					1^{3}	1			1^{1}	3			178
9	(Italy) Paolo Palanti	9^{7}	6	7^{13}	11	12^{14}	Ret	13^{15}	5	10^{10}	10	8^{8}	12	165
10	(Italy) Fabio Antonello	10^{9}	9	5^{9}	7	5^{13}	14	8^{10}	4	15	13			164
11	(Italy) Federico Desiderio					13	5			7^{8}	5	5^{10}	3	125
12	(Italy) Giorgio Fantilli	11^{15}	13	8^{14}	10	10^{12}	13	10^{8}	6	12	Ret			110
13	(Italy) Andrea Fazioli	Ret^{10}	Ret	10^{11}	9	11^{11}	11	Ret^{9}	10	14^{13}	Ret	10^{12}	9	110
14	(Italy) Emilio Damante	14^{14}	Ret	9^{12}	Ret	Ret^{10}	10	9^{11}	9					70
15	(Italy) Pietro Alessi	4^{5}	4											65
16	(Italy) Alessandro Lisi	5^{13}	7	DNS^{1}	DNS	Ret^{15}	Ret	12^{13}	Ret					57
17	(Italy) Andrea Palazzo					6^{8}	16			Ret^{15}	Ret	7^{9}	10	50
18	(Italy) Andrea Argenti	7^{12}	10							13^{14}	11			49
19	(Italy) Angelo Marino	12	Ret	Ret^{6}	Ret	9^{6}	17							40
20	(Italy) Filippo Maria Zanin							7^{4}	13					35
21	(Italy) Carlotta Fedeli									9^{9}	8			35
22	(Italy) Gabriele Foglia					15	12	15^{12}	Ret	16^{11}	12	11^{7}	11	34
23	(Italy) Ezio Muccio			Ret^{8}	6									29
24	(Italy) Davide Nardilli											12^{5}	6	28
25	(Italy) Fabio Bagnoli	13	12					Ret	11					21
26	(Italy) Diego Cassarà							14	8					18
27	(Turkey) Temel Camlidag					Ret	15							1
Pos.	Driver	MIS		PER		MUG		IMO		VAL		MON		Pts.
