= 2024 TCR Europe Touring Car Series =

European motorsport championship

The 2024 TCR Europe Touring Car Series was the eighth season of TCR Europe Touring Car Series. The season began at Vallelunga Circuit in April and ended at Circuit Ricardo Tormo in late September.

== Calendar ==
The calendar was announced on 14 December 2023 with 6 rounds scheduled.

Part of the TCR Eastern Europe

Rnd.		Circuit/Location	Date	Supporting
1	1	Vallelunga Circuit, Campagnano di Roma, Italy	19–21 April	TCR World Tour; TCR Italian Series
1	2	Vallelunga Circuit, Campagnano di Roma, Italy	19–21 April	TCR World Tour; TCR Italian Series
2	3	Circuit Zolder, Heusden-Zolder, Belgium	17–19 May	Belcar Endurance Championship
2	4	Circuit Zolder, Heusden-Zolder, Belgium	17–19 May	Belcar Endurance Championship
3	5	Salzburgring, Salzburg, Austria	31 May–2 June	MOTORTAG
3	6	Salzburgring, Salzburg, Austria	31 May–2 June	MOTORTAG
4	7	Circuit de Spa-Francorchamps, Stavelot, Belgium	4–6 July	25 Hours Fun Cup
4	8	Circuit de Spa-Francorchamps, Stavelot, Belgium	4–6 July	25 Hours Fun Cup
5	9	Brno Circuit, Brno, Czech Republic	6–8 September	TCR Eastern Europe Trophy; Formula 4 CEZ Championship
5	10	Brno Circuit, Brno, Czech Republic	6–8 September	TCR Eastern Europe Trophy; Formula 4 CEZ Championship
6	11	Circuit Ricardo Tormo, Cheste, Spain	27–29 September	Iberian SuperCars; 7 Racing Eurocup
6	12	Circuit Ricardo Tormo, Cheste, Spain	27–29 September	Iberian SuperCars; 7 Racing Eurocup

== Teams and drivers ==
Team	Car	No.	Drivers	Class	Rounds
(Italy) MM Motorsport	Honda Civic Type R TCR (FL5)	3	(Italy) Giacomo Ghermandi		5
(France) SP Competition	Cupra León VZ TCR	7	(France) Aurélien Comte		All
(France) SP Competition	Cupra León VZ TCR	34	(Belgium) Giovanni Scamardi		All
(Italy) Gruppo Baldan by Comtoyou Racing	Audi RS 3 LMS TCR (2021)	8	(Italy) Nicola Baldan	D	1–4, 6
(Italy) Gruppo Baldan by Comtoyou Racing	Cupra León VZ TCR	16	(France) Jimmy Clairet		4, 6
(Germany) Mertel Motorsport	Honda Civic Type R TCR (FK8)	8	(Germany) René Kircher	G	5
(Germany) Mertel Motorsport	Honda Civic Type R TCR (FK8)	9	(Georgia (country)) Davit Kajaia	G	5
(Germany) Mertel Motorsport	Honda Civic Type R TCR (FK8)	20	(Austria) Jorden Dolischka	G	5
(Sweden) MA:GP	Lynk & Co 03 TCR	10	(Sweden) Viktor Andersson		All
(Spain) GOAT Racing	Honda Civic Type R TCR (FL5)	11	(Spain) Rubén Fernández	D	1–4, 6
(Spain) GOAT Racing	Honda Civic Type R TCR (FL5)	19	(Spain) Felipe Fernández	D	All
(Spain) GOAT Racing	Honda Civic Type R TCR (FL5)	33	(Spain) Santiago Concepción	R	2–6
(Spain) GOAT Racing	Honda Civic Type R TCR (FL5)	62	(Serbia) Dušan Borković	D	1
(Italy) PMA Motorsport	Audi RS 3 LMS TCR (2021)	17	(Canada) Nicolas Taylor	R	6
(Italy) PMA Motorsport	Audi RS 3 LMS TCR (2021)	54	(Italy) Sandro Pelatti	D	6
(Czech Republic) Janik Motorsport	Hyundai Elantra N TCR	11	(Czech Republic) Jiří Zbožínek	G	5
(Czech Republic) Janik Motorsport	Hyundai Elantra N TCR	68	(Czech Republic) Adam Kout	G	5
(Czech Republic) Janik Motorsport	Hyundai Elantra N TCR	70	(Slovakia) Maťo Homola	G	5
(Czech Republic) Express Auto Racing	Cupra León Competición TCR	14	(Czech Republic) Petr Čížek	G	5
(Czech Republic) Express Auto Racing	Cupra León Competición TCR	82	(Czech Republic) Vít Smejkal	G	5
(Spain) Monlau Motorsport	Cupra León VZ TCR	21	(Spain) Eric Gené	R	4
(Spain) Monlau Motorsport	Cupra León VZ TCR	72	(Argentina) Franco Girolami		All
(North Macedonia) PSS Racing Team with Monlau	Cupra León VZ TCR	110	(North Macedonia) Viktor Davidovski	D	All
(Estonia) ALM Motorsport	Honda Civic Type R TCR (FL5)	23	(Argentina) Ignacio Montenegro	R	All
(Estonia) ALM Motorsport	Honda Civic Type R TCR (FL5)	27	(Estonia) Ruben Volt		1–4, 6
(Estonia) ALM Motorsport	Honda Civic Type R TCR (FL5)	64	(Hungary) Levente Losonczy		All
(Spain) RC2 Junior Team	Audi RS 3 LMS TCR (2021)	41	(Spain) Victor Fernández	D	6
(Austria) Mair Racing Osttirol	Audi RS 3 LMS TCR (2017)	42	(Austria) Sandro Soubek		3
(Croatia) Auto Klub Dubrovnik	Cupra León Competición TCR	48	(Montenegro) Fraňo Dubreta	G	5
(Croatia) Auto Klub Dubrovnik	Hyundai Elantra N TCR	74	(Croatia) Žarko Knego	G	5
(Portugal) JT59 Racing Team	Hyundai Elantra N TCR	59	(Portugal) Daniel Teixeira	D	6
(Czech Republic) Aditis Racing	Audi RS 3 LMS TCR (2021)	97	(Poland) Bartosz Groszek		5
(Czech Republic) Aditis Racing	Audi RS 3 LMS TCR (2021)	301	(Czech Republic) Martin Kadlečík	G	5
(Latvia) LV Racing	Audi RS 3 LMS TCR (2021)	121	(Latvia) Ivars Vallers	G	5
(United Kingdom) Jenson Brickley Racing	Cupra León VZ TCR	246	(United Kingdom) Jenson Brickley	R	6

Icon	Class
R	Eligible for TCR Europe Rookie Trophy
D	Eligible for TCR Europe Diamond Trophy
G	Guest drivers ineligible to score points

== Results and standings ==
Rnd.		Circuit/Location	Pole position	Fastest lap	Winning driver	Winning team	Winning rookie driver	Winning Diamond driver
1	1	(Italy) Vallelunga Circuit	(Argentina) Franco Girolami	(Argentina) Franco Girolami	(Argentina) Franco Girolami	(Spain) Monlau Motorsport	(Argentina) Ignacio Montenegro	(Italy) Nicola Baldan
1	2	(Italy) Vallelunga Circuit		(France) Aurélien Comte	(France) Aurélien Comte	(France) SP Competition	(Argentina) Ignacio Montenegro	(Spain) Felipe Fernández
2	3	(Belgium) Circuit Zolder	(Italy) Nicola Baldan	(Italy) Nicola Baldan	(Italy) Nicola Baldan	(Belgium) Comtoyou Racing	(Argentina) Ignacio Montenegro	(Italy) Nicola Baldan
2	4	(Belgium) Circuit Zolder		(Spain) Felipe Fernández	(Hungary) Levente Losonczy	(Estonia) ALM Motorsport	(Argentina) Ignacio Montenegro	(Spain) Felipe Fernández
3	5	(Austria) Salzburgring	(Argentina) Franco Girolami	(Argentina) Franco Girolami	(Argentina) Franco Girolami	(Spain) Monlau Motorsport	(Argentina) Ignacio Montenegro	(North Macedonia) Viktor Davidovski
3	6	(Austria) Salzburgring		(Hungary) Levente Losonczy	(Estonia) Ruben Volt	(Estonia) ALM Motorsport	(Argentina) Ignacio Montenegro	(Italy) Nicola Baldan
4	7	(Belgium) Circuit de Spa-Francorchamps	(Spain) Felipe Fernández	(Argentina) Franco Girolami	(Estonia) Ruben Volt	(Estonia) ALM Motorsport	(Argentina) Ignacio Montenegro	(Spain) Felipe Fernández
4	8	(Belgium) Circuit de Spa-Francorchamps		(Spain) Felipe Fernández	(Argentina) Ignacio Montenegro	(Estonia) ALM Motorsport	(Argentina) Ignacio Montenegro	(Italy) Nicola Baldan
5	9	(Czech Republic) Brno Circuit	(Argentina) Franco Girolami	(Argentina) Franco Girolami	(Argentina) Franco Girolami	(Spain) Monlau Motorsport	(Argentina) Ignacio Montenegro	(Spain) Felipe Fernández
5	10	(Czech Republic) Brno Circuit		(Argentina) Franco Girolami	(Hungary) Levente Losonczy	(Estonia) ALM Motorsport	(Argentina) Ignacio Montenegro	(Spain) Felipe Fernández
6	11	(Spain) Circuit Ricardo Tormo	(Argentina) Ignacio Montenegro	(Argentina) Franco Girolami	(Argentina) Franco Girolami	(Spain) Monlau Motorsport	(Argentina) Ignacio Montenegro	(Spain) Felipe Fernández
6	12	(Spain) Circuit Ricardo Tormo		(France) Jimmy Clairet	(France) Jimmy Clairet	(Belgium) Comtoyou Racing	(Spain) Santiago Concepción	(North Macedonia) Viktor Davidovski

== Championship standings ==
Scoring system

Position	1st	2nd	3rd	4th	5th	6th	7th	8th	9th	10th	11th	12th	13th	14th	15th
Qualifying	10	7	5	4	3	2	1	—N/a							
Races	40	35	30	27	24	21	18	15	13	11	9	7	5	3	1

=== Drivers' championship ===
Pos.	Driver	VAL (Italy)		ZOL (Belgium)		SAL (Austria)		SPA (Belgium)		BRN (Czech Republic)		CRT (Spain)		Pts.
1	(Argentina) Franco Girolami	1^{1}	2	4^{4}	3	1^{1}	11	2	8	1^{1}	9	1^{2}	6	395
2	(France) Aurélien Comte	2^{3}	1	2^{2}	5	4^{5}	3	4^{3}	6	2^{2}	8	3^{5}	4	382
3	(Argentina) Ignacio Montenegro	3^{4}	6	7^{5}	6	2^{2}	4	5	1	8^{4}	2	2^{1}	15	342
4	(Estonia) Ruben Volt	5^{5}	Ret	3^{3}	2	3	1	1^{2}	7			14^{6}	2	269
5	(Spain) Felipe Fernández	6^{7}	3	9	4	7^{6}	9	3^{1}	5	9	7	6	9	269
6	(Hungary) Levente Losonczy	10	8	10	1	5^{7}	2	11	3	14^{7}	1	7	13	246
7	(Sweden) Viktor Andersson	12	4	6^{6}	9	11^{3}	8	12^{6}	2	4^{3}	3	Ret^{3}	8	232
8	(Italy) Nicola Baldan	4^{2}	5	1^{1}	7	12	6	6	4			15^{7}	Ret	201
9	(North Macedonia) Viktor Davidovski	8	9	5^{7}	Ret	6	10	8	12	21	13	8	3	178
10	(Spain) Santiago Concepción			11	10	9^{4}	7	10^{7}	9			4^{4}	5	135
11	(Belgium) Giovanni Scamardi	11	7	12	Ret	10	5	7	10	10^{5}	10	Ret	Ret	134
12	(France) Jimmy Clairet							9	11			5	1	86
13	(Spain) Rubén Fernández	9	Ret	8	8	8	Ret	Ret^{5}	Ret			12	12	80
14	(Poland) Bartosz Groszek									6^{6}	4			56
15	(Canada) Nicolas Taylor											9	7	31
16	(Serbia) Dušan Borković	7^{6}	10											29
17	(Portugal) Daniel Teixeira											13	11	16
18	(Spain) Victor Fernández											11	14	12
19	(United Kingdom) Jenson Brickley											10	Ret	11
20	(Italy) Giacomo Ghermandi									Ret	19			11
21	(Italy) Sandro Pelatti											Ret	10	11
22	(Spain) Eric Gené							13	Ret					5
–	(Austria) Sandro Soubek					Ret	Ret							–
Guest entries ineligible for points
–	(Slovakia) Maťo Homola									3	11			–
–	(Czech Republic) Martin Kadlečík									5	6			–
–	(Czech Republic) Adam Kout									7	5			–
–	(Georgia (country)) Davit Kajaia									11	12			–
–	(Czech Republic) Jiří Zbožínek									12	17			–
–	(Croatia) Žarko Knego									13	Ret			–
–	(Latvia) Ivars Vallers									17	14			–
–	(Montenegro) Fraňo Dubreta									18	15			–
–	(Czech Republic) Petr Čížek									15	Ret			–
–	(Germany) René Kircher									16	16			–
–	(Austria) Jorden Dolischka									20	18			–
–	(Czech Republic) Vít Smejkal									19	Ret			–
Pos.	Driver	VAL (Italy)		ZOL (Belgium)		SAL (Austria)		SPA (Belgium)		BRN (Czech Republic)		CRT (Spain)		Pts.

Colour	Result
Gold	Winner
Silver	Second place
Bronze	Third place
Green	Points classification
Blue	Non-points classification
Blue	Non-classified finish (NC)
Purple	Retired, not classified (Ret)
Red	Did not qualify (DNQ)
Red	Did not pre-qualify (DNPQ)
Black	Disqualified (DSQ)
White	Did not start (DNS)
White	Withdrew (WD)
White	Race cancelled (C)
Blank	Did not practice (DNP)
Blank	Did not arrive (DNA)
Blank	Excluded (EX)

^{1} ^{2} ^{3} ^{4} ^{5} ^{6} ^{7} – Points-scoring position in qualifying, only counting Rookie drivers.

† – Drivers did not finish the race, but were classified as they completed over 75% of the race distance.

=== Teams' championship ===
Pos.	Team	Pts.
1	(Estonia) ALM Motorsport	698
2	(Spain) Monlau Motorsport	609
3	(France) SP Compétition	555
4	(Spain) GOAT Racing	321
5	(Belgium) Comtoyou Racing	316
6	(Sweden) MA:GP	260
7	(Czech Republic) Aditis Racing	56
8	(Italy) PMA Motorsport	52
9	(Spain) RC2 Junior Team	22
10	(Portugal) JT59 Racing Team	22
11	(United Kingdom) Jenson Brickley Racing	16
12	(Italy) MM Motorsport	11

=== Rookie Trophy ===
Pos.	Driver	VAL (Italy)		ZOL (Belgium)		SAL (Austria)		SPA (Belgium)		BRN (Czech Republic)		CRT (Spain)		Pts.
1	(Argentina) Ignacio Montenegro	3^{1}	6	7^{1}	6	2^{1}	4	5^{2}	1	5^{1}	2	2^{1}	15	527
2	(Spain) Santiago Concepción			11^{2}	10	9^{2}	7	10^{1}	9			4^{2}	5	316
3	(Canada) Nicolas Taylor											9^{4}	7	69
4	(Spain) Eric Gené							13^{3}	Ret					35
5	(United Kingdom) Jenson Brickley											10^{3}	Ret	32
Pos.	Driver	VAL (Italy)		ZOL (Belgium)		SAL (Austria)		SPA (Belgium)		BRN (Czech Republic)		CRT (Spain)		

Colour	Result
Gold	Winner
Silver	Second place
Bronze	Third place
Green	Points classification
Blue	Non-points classification
Blue	Non-classified finish (NC)
Purple	Retired, not classified (Ret)
Red	Did not qualify (DNQ)
Red	Did not pre-qualify (DNPQ)
Black	Disqualified (DSQ)
White	Did not start (DNS)
White	Withdrew (WD)
White	Race cancelled (C)
Blank	Did not practice (DNP)
Blank	Did not arrive (DNA)
Blank	Excluded (EX)

† – Drivers did not finish the race, but were classified as they completed over 75% of the race distance.

=== Diamond Trophy ===
Pos.	Driver	VAL (Italy)		ZOL (Belgium)		SAL (Austria)		SPA (Belgium)		BRN (Czech Republic)		CRT (Spain)		Pts.
1	(Spain) Felipe Fernández	6	3	9	4	7	9	3	6	6	5	6	9	252
2	(North Macedonia) Viktor Davidovski	8	9	5	Ret	6	10	8	12	9	9	8	3	194
3	(Italy) Nicola Baldan	4	5	1	7	12	6	6	4			15	Ret	174
4	(Spain) Rubén Fernández	9	Ret	8	8	8	Ret	Ret	Ret			12	12	77
5	(Serbia) Dušan Borković	7	10											27
6	(Spain) Victor Fernández Gil											11	14	23
7	(Portugal) Daniel Teixeira											13	11	22
8	(Italy) Giacomo Ghermandi									Ret	19			15
Pos.	Driver	VAL (Italy)		ZOL (Belgium)		SAL (Austria)		SPA (Belgium)		BRN (Czech Republic)		CRT (Spain)		

Colour	Result
Gold	Winner
Silver	Second place
Bronze	Third place
Green	Points classification
Blue	Non-points classification
Blue	Non-classified finish (NC)
Purple	Retired, not classified (Ret)
Red	Did not qualify (DNQ)
Red	Did not pre-qualify (DNPQ)
Black	Disqualified (DSQ)
White	Did not start (DNS)
White	Withdrew (WD)
White	Race cancelled (C)
Blank	Did not practice (DNP)
Blank	Did not arrive (DNA)
Blank	Excluded (EX)

† – Drivers did not finish the race, but were classified as they completed over 75% of the race distance.
