= Viktor Davidovski =

Macedonian racing driver (born 1980)

- Виктор Давидовски
- Born: Viktor Davidovski; 15 May 1980 (age 46); Skopje, SR Macedonia, SFR Yugoslavia (present day North Macedonia)
- Nationality: (North Macedonia) Macedonian

Viktor Davidovski (born 15 May 1980) is a Macedonian racing driver who last competed for PSS Racing Team with Monlau in TCR Europe Touring Car Series.

== Career ==
Davidovski began racing in 1999, racing mainly in the Macedonian and Serbian Touring Car Championships. He continued racing locally until 2017, when he made his international debut by making a one-off appearance in the Touring Car Endurance Series season-finale at Spa for Zest Racecar Engineering.

The following year, Davidovski partook in his first full-time season in TCR Europe for PSS Racing Team. In his first season in the series, Davidovski failed to score a point throughout the 14-race season, only taking a best result of 14th at both the Hungaroring and Assen. In 2019, Davidovski and PSS Racing Team returned to TCR Europe for their sophomore season in the series. After taking his maiden points in TCR competition by finishing 14th in race two at the Red Bull Ring, Davidovski ended the year by scoring points twice more, finishing 15th and 13th in the season-ending round at Monza.

After sitting most of 2020 on the sidelines, Davidovski returned to TCR Europe, racing in both the Monza and Jarama rounds for PSS Racing Team. Davidovski scored a best result of ninth in both rounds and ended the year 24th in the standings on 26 points. Davidovski returned to TCR Europe full-time competition the following year, alongside Franco Girolami. In his third full-time season in the series, Davidovski scored a best result of fourth at Le Castellet and ended the year 16th in points despite missing the round at Spa.

In 2022, Davidovski switched to Comtoyou Racing alongside Girolami as the two PSS Racing-backed cars in the team's three-car operation. In the second round of the season at Le Castellet, Davidovski took his maiden series win in race two and made history as the first Diamond Trophy entrant to win a race overall. Following that, Davidovski failed to score a podium in the remaining six rounds, taking a best result of fourth in both the Norisring races on his way to 12th in points. In late 2022, Davidovski also competed in the final two rounds of the World Touring Car Cup for the same team as a wildcard entry. Racing in the Bahrain and Jeddah rounds, Davidovski took his only series podium in race two of the latter round by finishing second.

Davidovski remained with Comtoyou Racing for 2023, as the team expanded to a four-car lineup. In his second season with the team, Davidovski scored a lone podium in race one at Monza, en route to a fourth-place points finish at season's end. With Comtoyou Racing leaving TCR competitions after 2023, Davidovski joined Monlau Motorsport alongside Franco Girolami. In his only season with the team, Davidovski took his only podium of the season at the finale in Valencia as he concluded the year ninth in the overall standings.

Davidovski then transitioned to the TCR European Endurance championship for 2025, driving for BRC Racing Team at Vallelunga alongside Néstor Girolami, finishing third in his only appearance of the season.

== Racing record ==
=== Racing career summary ===
Season	Series	Team	Races	Wins	Poles	F/Laps	Podiums	Points	Position
2017	Touring Car Endurance Series – TCR	Zest Racecar Engineering	1	0	0	0	0	0	36th
2018	TCR Europe Touring Car Series	PSS Racing Team	12	0	0	0	0	0	36th
2018	TCR Swiss Trophy	PSS Racing Team	6	0	0	0	0	0	NC
2018	TCR Ibérico Touring Car Series	PSS Racing Team	2	0	0	0	0	0	26th
2019	TCR Europe Touring Car Series	PSS Racing Team	14	0	0	0	0	9	33rd
2019	TCR Ibérico Touring Car Series	PSS Racing Team	2	0	0	0	0	0	35th
2020	TCR Europe Touring Car Series	PSS Racing Team	4	0	0	0	0	26	24th
2021	TCR Europe Touring Car Series	PSS Racing Team	14	0	0	0	0	95	16th
2022	TCR Europe Touring Car Series	Audi Sport Team Comtoyou PSS	14	1	0	1	1	169	12th
2022	World Touring Car Cup	Comtoyou Racing	4	0	0	0	1	0	NC†
2023	TCR Europe Touring Car Series	Comtoyou Racing	14	0	0	0	1	266	4th
2023	TCR World Tour	Comtoyou Racing	6	0	0	0	0	12	32nd
2024	TCR Europe Touring Car Series	PSS Racing Team with Monlau	12	0	0	0	1	178	9th
2024	TCR Eastern Europe Trophy	PSS Racing Team with Monlau	2	0	0	0	0	0	NC†
2025	TCR European Endurance	BRC Racing Team	1	0	0	0	1	68	12th

^{†} As Davidovski was a guest driver, he was ineligible for points.

=== Complete TCR Europe Touring Car Series results ===
(key) (Races in bold indicate pole position) (Races in italics indicate fastest lap)

Year	Team	Car	1	2	3	4	5	6	7	8	9	10	11	12	13	14	DC	Points
2018	PSS Racing Team	Honda Civic Type R TCR (FK8)	LEC; 1; 16	LEC; 2 Ret	ZAN; 1; 15	ZAN; 2; 15	SPA; 1 DNS	SPA; 2 DNS	HUN; 1; 14	HUN; 2; 18	ASS; 1; 17	ASS; 2; 14	MNZ; 1; 19	MNZ; 2; 16	CAT; 1; 16	CAT; 2; 15	36th	0
2019	PSS Racing Team	Honda Civic Type R TCR (FK8)	HUN; 1; 24	HUN; 2; 24	HOC; 1; 19	HOC; 2; 22	SPA; 1; 24	SPA; 2; 18	RBR; 1 Ret	RBR; 2; 14	OSC; 1; 17	OSC; 2; 18	CAT; 1; 22	CAT; 2 Ret	MNZ; 1; 15	MNZ; 2; 13	33rd	9
2020	PSS Racing Team	Honda Civic Type R TCR (FK8)	LEC; 1	LEC; 2	ZOL; 1	ZOL; 2	MNZ; 1; 9	MNZ; 2; 20	CAT; 1	CAT; 2	SPA; 1	SPA; 2	JAR; 1; 16	JAR; 2; 9			24th	26
2021	PSS Racing Team	Honda Civic Type R TCR (FK8)	SVK; 1; 13	SVK; 2; 18	LEC; 1; 8^{4}	LEC; 2; 4	ZAN; 1; 11	ZAN; 2; 10	SPA; 1	SPA; 2	NÜR; 1; 18^{9}	NÜR; 2; 13	MNZ; 1; 9	MNZ; 2; 26	CAT; 1; 12	CAT; 2; 19	16th	95
2022	Audi Sport Team Comtoyou PSS	Audi RS 3 LMS TCR (2021)	ALG; 1; 13	ALG; 2; 10	LEC; 1; 6	LEC; 2; 1	SPA; 1; 11	SPA; 2 Ret	NOR; 1; 4	NOR; 2; 4	NÜR; 1; 14	NÜR; 2 C	MNZ; 1; 16	MNZ; 2; 14	CAT; 1; 15	CAT; 2; 9	12th	169
2023	Comtoyou Racing	Audi RS 3 LMS TCR (2021)	ALG; 1; 13^{4}	ALG; 2; 19	PAU; 1; 4^{7}	PAU; 2; 7	SPA; 1; 11^{5}	SPA; 2; 16	HUN; 1; 13^{7}	HUN; 2 Ret	LEC; 1; 7	LEC; 2; 7	MNZ; 1; 3^{4}	MNZ; 2; 8	CAT; 1; 8	CAT; 2; 12	4th	266
2024	PSS Racing Team with Monlau	Cupra León VZ TCR	VAL; 1; 8	VAL; 2; 9	ZOL; 1; 5^{7}	ZOL; 2 Ret	SAL; 1; 6	SAL; 2; 10	SPA; 1; 8	SPA; 2; 12	BRN; 1; 21	BRN; 2; 13	CRT; 1; 8	CRT; 2; 3			9th	178

^{†} Driver did not finish, but was classified as he completed over 75% of the race distance.

=== Complete World Touring Car Cup results ===
(key) (Races in bold indicate pole position) (Races in italics indicate fastest lap)

Year	Team	Car	1	2	3	4	5	6	7	8	9	10	11	12	13	14	15	16	17	18	DC	Points
2022	Comtoyou Racing	Audi RS 3 LMS TCR (2021)	FRA; 1	FRA; 2	GER; 1	GER; 2	HUN; 1	HUN; 2	ESP; 1	ESP; 2	POR; 1	POR; 2	ITA; 1	ITA; 2	ALS; 1	ALS; 2	BHR; 1; 10	BHR; 2; 13	SAU; 1; 8	SAU; 2; 2	NC‡	0

^{‡} As Davidovski was a Wildcard entry, he was ineligible to score points.

=== Complete TCR World Tour results ===
(key) (Races in bold indicate pole position) (Races in italics indicate fastest lap)

Year	Team	Car	1	2	3	4	5	6	7	8	9	10	11	12	13	14	15	16	17	18	19	20	DC	Points
2023	Comtoyou	Audi RS 3 LMS TCR (2021)	ALG; 1; 13	ALG; 2; 19	SPA; 1; 11	SPA; 2; 16	VAL; 1	VAL; 2	HUN; 1; 13	HUN; 2 Ret	ELP; 1	ELP; 2	VIL; 1	VIL; 2	SYD; 1	SYD; 2	SYD; 3	BAT; 1	BAT; 2	BAT; 3	MAC; 1	MAC; 2	32nd	12
