= 2023 TCR World Tour =

Motorsport contest

The 2023 Kumho TCR World Tour was the inaugural season of the TCR World Tour, a new international touring car racing competition for TCR cars. Effectively succeeding the WTCR series, it was also the ninth season of international TCR competition dating back to the 2015 TCR International Series.

The season consisted of nine events selected from a number of TCR series worldwide, and would determine 15 of the drivers to qualify for the end-of-year TCR World Ranking Final. The highest-ranked driver and team in the World Tour was awarded the TCR World Tour Cup. It started on 28 April at Autódromo Internacional do Algarve, Portugal and ended on 19 November at Guia Circuit, Macau.

The top 15 drivers from the World Tour were set to join the top 45 drivers that qualified with TCR World Ranking points into a 2023 TCR World Final, which was due to take place in March 2024 at the Algarve International Circuit in Portugal. These plans were later cancelled, with the event rescheduled and the qualification system revised.

== Calendar ==
The championship will be contested over nine rounds in Europe, Asia, Australia and South America.

Round	Race	Circuit	Date	Partner championship
1	1	Algarve International Circuit, Portimão, Portugal	28–30 April	TCR Europe Touring Car Series
1	2	Algarve International Circuit, Portimão, Portugal	28–30 April	TCR Europe Touring Car Series
2	3	Circuit de Spa-Francorchamps, Stavelot, Belgium	26–28 May	TCR Europe Touring Car Series
2	4	Circuit de Spa-Francorchamps, Stavelot, Belgium	26–28 May	TCR Europe Touring Car Series
3	5	Vallelunga Circuit, Campagnano di Roma, Italy	9–11 June	TCR Italian Festival
3	6	Vallelunga Circuit, Campagnano di Roma, Italy	9–11 June	TCR Italian Festival
4	7	Hungaroring, Budapest, Hungary	16–18 June	TCR Europe Touring Car Series
4	8	Hungaroring, Budapest, Hungary	16–18 June	TCR Europe Touring Car Series
5	9	Autódromo Víctor Borrat Fabini, El Pinar, Uruguay	18–20 August	TCR South America Touring Car Championship
5	10	Autódromo Víctor Borrat Fabini, El Pinar, Uruguay	18–20 August	TCR South America Touring Car Championship
6	11	Autódromo José Carlos Bassi, Villa Mercedes, Argentina	25–27 August	TCR South America Touring Car Championship
6	12	Autódromo José Carlos Bassi, Villa Mercedes, Argentina	25–27 August	TCR South America Touring Car Championship
7	13	Sydney Motorsport Park, Eastern Creek, Australia	3–5 November	TCR Australia Touring Car Series
7	14	Sydney Motorsport Park, Eastern Creek, Australia	3–5 November	TCR Australia Touring Car Series
7	15	Sydney Motorsport Park, Eastern Creek, Australia	3–5 November	TCR Australia Touring Car Series
8	16	Mount Panorama Circuit, Bathurst, Australia	10–12 November	TCR Australia Touring Car Series
8	17	Mount Panorama Circuit, Bathurst, Australia	10–12 November	TCR Australia Touring Car Series
8	18	Mount Panorama Circuit, Bathurst, Australia	10–12 November	TCR Australia Touring Car Series
9	19	Guia Circuit, Macau, China (Note: Subject to agreement with promoters.)	16–19 November	Macau Guia Race
9	20	Guia Circuit, Macau, China	16–19 November	Macau Guia Race
Map of circuit locations
2023 TCR World Tour is located in Earth

== Teams and drivers ==
Team	Car	No.	Drivers	Status	Rounds	Ref.
(Argentina) Paladini Racing	Audi RS 3 LMS TCR (2017)	1	(Argentina) Fabricio Pezzini		5	
(Argentina) Paladini Racing	Toyota GR Corolla Sport TCR	2	(Argentina) Juan Ángel Rosso		5–6	
(Argentina) Paladini Racing	Toyota GR Corolla Sport TCR	5	(Argentina) Fabián Yannantuoni		5–6	
(Australia) / Honda Wall Racing (Note: Cars No. 1 and No. 129 entered as "Honda Wall Racing". Cars No. 74 and No. 76 entered as "Exclusive Switchboards with Wall Racing".); (Australia) / Exclusive Switchboards with Wall Racing	Honda Civic Type R TCR (FL5)	1	(Australia) Tony D'Alberto		7–8	
(Australia) / Honda Wall Racing; (Australia) / Exclusive Switchboards with Wall Racing	Honda Civic Type R TCR (FL5)	129	(Argentina) Néstor Girolami	W	7–8	
(Australia) / Honda Wall Racing; (Australia) / Exclusive Switchboards with Wall Racing	Honda Civic Type R TCR (FK7)	74	(Australia) Brad Harris		7–8	
(Australia) / Honda Wall Racing; (Australia) / Exclusive Switchboards with Wall Racing	Honda Civic Type R TCR (FK7)	76	(Australia) Will Harris		7–8	
(Hong Kong) Evolve Racing	Hyundai Elantra N TCR	1	(Hong Kong) Lo Sze Ho		9	
(Australia) GRM – Hangcha Forklifts	Peugeot 308 TCR	4	(France) Jimmy Clairet		7	
(Australia) GRM – Hangcha Forklifts	Peugeot 308 TCR	4	(France) Teddy Clairet		8	
(Australia) GRM Team Valvoline	Peugeot 308 TCR	18	(Australia) Aaron Cameron		7–8	
(Australia) GRM Team Valvoline	Peugeot 308 TCR	41	(Australia) Kody Garland		7–8	
(Australia) GRM – Schaeffler	Peugeot 308 TCR	33	(Australia) Jordan Cox		7–8	
(France) Team Clairet Sport – Burson Auto Parts Racing (Note: Car No. 71 entered as "Team Clairet Sport – Burson Auto Parts Racing" in rounds 1–2, "GRM – Burson Auto Parts Racing" in rounds 7–8, and "Team Clairet Sport – Hangcha Racing" in round 9.) (Australia) GRM – Burson Auto Parts Racing (France) Team Clairet Sport – Hangcha Racing	Peugeot 308 TCR	71	(Australia) Ben Bargwanna		1–2, 7–9	
(China) Z.Speed	Hyundai i30 N TCR	6	(China) Li Wengji		9	
(Spain) Volcano Motorsport	Audi RS 3 LMS TCR (2021)	7	(Ukraine) Daniel Tkachenko		4	
(Spain) Volcano Motorsport	Audi RS 3 LMS TCR (2021)	23	(United Kingdom) Isaac Smith		1–2	
(Spain) Volcano Motorsport	Audi RS 3 LMS TCR (2021)	39	(United Kingdom) Lewis Brown		1–2, 4	
(Italy) Aggressive Team Italia	Hyundai Elantra N TCR	8	(Italy) Nicola Baldan		1	
(Italy) Aggressive Team Italia	Hyundai Elantra N TCR	31	(Italy) Kevin Ceccon		3–4	
(Italy) Aggressive Team Italia	Hyundai Elantra N TCR	48	(Sweden) Mikael Karlsson		1–2, 4	
(Italy) Aggressive Team Italia	Hyundai Elantra N TCR	264	(Hungary) Levente Losonczy		2, 4	
(Argentina) PMO Motorsport	Lynk & Co 03 TCR	8	(Brazil) Rafael Suzuki		5	
(Argentina) PMO Motorsport	Lynk & Co 03 TCR	22	(Argentina) Matías Milla		6	
(Argentina) PMO Motorsport	Lynk & Co 03 TCR	24	(Uruguay) Frederick Balbi		5–6	
(Argentina) PMO Racing	Peugeot 308 TCR	35	(Uruguay) Gonzalo Reilly		5	
(Argentina) PMO Racing	Peugeot 308 TCR	36	(Argentina) Damián Fineschi		5	
(Australia) / MPC – Team Liqui Moly (Note: Car No. 9 entered as "MPC – Team Liqui Moly". Car No. 14 entered as "Purple Sector".); (Australia) / Purple Sector	Audi RS 3 LMS TCR (2021)	9	(Australia) Will Brown		7–8	
(Australia) / MPC – Team Liqui Moly; (Australia) / Purple Sector	Audi RS 3 LMS TCR (2017)	14	(Australia) Lachlan Mineeff		7–8	
(Sweden) MA:GP	Lynk & Co 03 TCR	10	(Sweden) Viktor Andersson		1–2, 4	
(Brazil) Cobra Racing Team	Toyota GR Corolla Sport TCR	10	(Brazil) Adalberto Baptista		5–6	
(Brazil) Cobra Racing Team	Toyota GR Corolla Sport TCR	70	(Brazil) Diego Nunes		5–6	
(Belgium) Comtoyou	Audi RS 3 LMS TCR (2021)	11	(North Macedonia) Viktor Davidovski		1–2, 4	
(Belgium) Comtoyou	Audi RS 3 LMS TCR (2021)	27	(France) John Filippi		1–4	
(Belgium) Comtoyou Racing	Audi RS 3 LMS TCR (2021)	22	(Belgium) Kobe Pauwels		1–4	
(Belgium) Comtoyou Racing	Audi RS 3 LMS TCR (2021)	34	(Netherlands) Tom Coronel		1–2, 4	
(Belgium) Audi Sport Team Comtoyou	Audi RS 3 LMS TCR (2021)	27	(France) John Filippi		9	
(Belgium) Audi Sport Team Comtoyou	Audi RS 3 LMS TCR (2021)	122	(Belgium) Frédéric Vervisch	W	All	
(Belgium) Audi Sport Team Comtoyou	Audi RS 3 LMS TCR (2021)	179	(United Kingdom) Robert Huff	W	All	
(Spain) RC2 Racing Team	Audi RS 3 LMS TCR (2021)	12	(Spain) Rubén Fernández		1–2	
(Spain) RC2 Racing Team	Audi RS 3 LMS TCR (2021)	19	(Spain) Felipe Fernández		1–2	
(Italy) Alfa Racing	Alfa Romeo Giulietta Veloce TCR	13	(Uruguay) Carlos Silva		5	
(Italy) Alfa Racing	Alfa Romeo Giulietta Veloce TCR	90	(Uruguay) Michell Bonnin		5	
(Argentina) / Squadra Martino (Note: Cars No. 15, No. 23, No. 34 and No. 60 all entered as "Squadra Martino". Car No. 129 entered as "Squadra Martino Racing".); (Argentina) / Squadra Martino Racing	Honda Civic Type R TCR (FK7)	15	(Uruguay) Enrique Maglione		5–6	
(Argentina) / Squadra Martino; (Argentina) / Squadra Martino Racing	Honda Civic Type R TCR (FK7)	23	(Argentina) Ignacio Montenegro		5–6	
(Argentina) / Squadra Martino; (Argentina) / Squadra Martino Racing	Honda Civic Type R TCR (FK7)	34	(Brazil) Fabio Casagrande		5–6	
(Argentina) / Squadra Martino; (Argentina) / Squadra Martino Racing	Honda Civic Type R TCR (FK7)	60	(Uruguay) Juan Manuel Casella		5–6	
(Argentina) / Squadra Martino; (Argentina) / Squadra Martino Racing	Honda Civic Type R TCR (FL5)	129	(Argentina) Néstor Girolami	W	5–6	
(United Kingdom) Carl Cox Motorsport	Cupra León Competición TCR	15	(Australia) Michael Clemente		7–8	
(China) QMA Motorsports	Audi RS 3 LMS TCR (2017)	15	(China) Tian Kai		9	
Toyota Team Argentina	Toyota GR Corolla Sport TCR	17	(Argentina) Bernardo Llaver		5–6	
Toyota Team Argentina	Toyota GR Corolla Sport TCR	33	(Argentina) José Manuel Sapag		5–6	
(Italy) BRC Hyundai N Squadra Corse	Hyundai Elantra N TCR	18	(Italy) Marco Butti		3, 9	
(Italy) BRC Hyundai N Squadra Corse	Hyundai Elantra N TCR	105	(Hungary) Norbert Michelisz	W	All	
(Italy) BRC Hyundai N Squadra Corse	Hyundai Elantra N TCR	196	(Spain) Mikel Azcona	W	All	
(China) Teamwork Motorsport	Audi RS 3 LMS TCR (2021)	21	(Hong Kong) Paul Poon		9	
(Australia) Challenge Motorsport	Audi RS 3 LMS TCR (2017)	22	(Australia) Iain McDougall		7–8	
(China) Fancy Teamwork	Lynk & Co 03 TCR	22	(China) Yan Chuang		9	
(Brazil) / W2 Shell V-Power (Note: Car No. 28 entered as "W2 Shell V-Power". Car No. 77 entered as "W2 ProGP".); (Brazil) / W2 ProGP	Cupra León Competición TCR	28	(Brazil) Galid Osman		5–6	
(Brazil) / W2 Shell V-Power; (Brazil) / W2 ProGP	Cupra León Competición TCR	77	(Brazil) Raphael Reis		5–6	
(Australia) HMO Customer Racing	Hyundai Elantra N TCR	30	(Australia) Josh Buchan		7–8	
(Australia) HMO Customer Racing	Hyundai i30 N TCR	130	(Australia) Bailey Sweeny		7–8	
(China) 109 Racing	Honda Civic Type R TCR (FK7)	33	(China) Deng Baowei		9	
(Brazil) Scuderia Chiarelli	Hyundai Elantra N TCR	43	(Brazil) Pedro Cardoso		5–6	
(Italy) Target Competition	Hyundai Elantra N TCR	62	(Serbia) Dušan Borković		1–2, 4	
(France) SP Competition	Cupra León Competición TCR	76	(France) Aurélien Comte		3	
(France) SP Competition	Cupra León Competición TCR	77	(France) Sylvain Pussier		3	
(Argentina) Bratton Tito Bessone Team	Toyota GR Corolla Sport TCR	86	(Argentina) Esteban Guerrieri		5–6	
(Australia) Team Soutar Motorsport	Audi RS 3 LMS TCR (2021)	110	(Australia) Zac Soutar		7–8	
(Sweden) Cyan Racing Lynk & Co	Lynk & Co 03 FL TCR	111	(Sweden) Thed Björk	W	All	
(Sweden) Cyan Racing Lynk & Co	Lynk & Co 03 FL TCR	112	(Uruguay) Santiago Urrutia	W	All	
(Sweden) Cyan Racing Lynk & Co	Lynk & Co 03 FL TCR	155	(China) Ma Qing Hua	W	All	
(Sweden) Cyan Racing Lynk & Co	Lynk & Co 03 FL TCR	168	(France) Yann Ehrlacher	W	All	
(Australia) Autoglym Team Ashley Seward Motorsport	Lynk & Co 03 TCR	115	(United Kingdom) Tom Oliphant		7–8	
(Estonia) ALM Motorsport	Honda Civic Type R TCR (FL5)	123	(Estonia) Mattias Vahtel	W	3	
(Estonia) ALM Motorsport	Honda Civic Type R TCR (FL5)	127	(Estonia) Ruben Volt	W	4	
(Estonia) ALM Motorsport	Honda Civic Type R TCR (FL5)	128	(Denmark) Philip Lindberg	W	2	
(Estonia) ALM Motorsport	Honda Civic Type R TCR (FL5)	129	(Argentina) Néstor Girolami	W	1–4	
(Macau) MacPro Racing	Honda Civic Type R TCR (FL5)	129	(Argentina) Néstor Girolami	W	9	

Icon	Status
W	TCR World Tour entries not eligible to score points in the local series

== Results ==
Rnd.		Circuit/Location	Pole position	Fastest lap	Winning driver	Winning team	Report
1	1	(Portugal) Algarve International Circuit	(Hungary) Norbert Michelisz	(Spain) Mikel Azcona	(Hungary) Norbert Michelisz	(Italy) BRC Hyundai N Squadra Corse	
1	2	(Portugal) Algarve International Circuit		(Uruguay) Santiago Urrutia	(Uruguay) Santiago Urrutia	(Sweden) Cyan Racing Lynk & Co	
2	3	(Belgium) Circuit de Spa-Francorchamps	(France) Yann Ehrlacher	(France) Yann Ehrlacher	(France) Yann Ehrlacher	(Sweden) Cyan Racing Lynk & Co	
2	4	(Belgium) Circuit de Spa-Francorchamps		(France) Yann Ehrlacher	(France) John Filippi	(Belgium) Comtoyou Racing	
3	5	(Italy) Vallelunga Circuit	(Hungary) Norbert Michelisz	(Spain) Mikel Azcona	(Hungary) Norbert Michelisz	(Italy) BRC Hyundai N Squadra Corse	
3	6	(Italy) Vallelunga Circuit		(Spain) Mikel Azcona	(United Kingdom) Robert Huff	(Belgium) Audi Sport Team Comtoyou	
4	7	(Hungary) Hungaroring	(France) Yann Ehrlacher	(Argentina) Néstor Girolami	(France) Yann Ehrlacher	(Sweden) Cyan Racing Lynk & Co	
4	8	(Hungary) Hungaroring		(Spain) Mikel Azcona	(Sweden) Thed Björk	(Sweden) Cyan Racing Lynk & Co	
5	9	(Uruguay) Autódromo Víctor Borrat Fabini	(Uruguay) Santiago Urrutia	(Uruguay) Santiago Urrutia	(Uruguay) Santiago Urrutia	(Sweden) Cyan Racing Lynk & Co	Report
5	10	(Uruguay) Autódromo Víctor Borrat Fabini		(Spain) Mikel Azcona	(China) Ma Qing Hua	(Sweden) Cyan Racing Lynk & Co	Report
6	11	(Argentina) Autódromo José Carlos Bassi	(France) Yann Ehrlacher	(Spain) Mikel Azcona	(Spain) Mikel Azcona	(Italy) BRC Hyundai N Squadra Corse	Report
6	12	(Argentina) Autódromo José Carlos Bassi		(France) Yann Ehrlacher	(Argentina) Néstor Girolami	(Argentina) Squadra Martino Racing	Report
7	13	(Australia) Sydney Motorsport Park	(Australia) Ben Bargwanna	(China) Ma Qing Hua	(Australia) Will Brown	(Australia) MPC – Team Liqui Moly	Report
7	14	(Australia) Sydney Motorsport Park		(Australia) Josh Buchan	(Australia) Will Brown	(Australia) MPC – Team Liqui Moly	Report
7	15	(Australia) Sydney Motorsport Park		(Spain) Mikel Azcona	(United Kingdom) Robert Huff	(Belgium) Audi Sport Team Comtoyou	Report
8	16	(Australia) Mount Panorama Circuit	(Australia) Tony D'Alberto	(Uruguay) Santiago Urrutia	(Uruguay) Santiago Urrutia	(Sweden) Cyan Racing Lynk & Co	Report
8	17	(Australia) Mount Panorama Circuit		(Belgium) Frédéric Vervisch	(Hungary) Norbert Michelisz	(Italy) BRC Hyundai N Squadra Corse	Report
8	18	(Australia) Mount Panorama Circuit		(Argentina) Néstor Girolami	(France) Yann Ehrlacher	(Sweden) Cyan Racing Lynk & Co	Report
9	19	(Macau) Guia Circuit	(Hungary) Norbert Michelisz	(Hungary) Norbert Michelisz	(Hungary) Norbert Michelisz	(Italy) BRC Hyundai N Squadra Corse	Report
9	20	(Macau) Guia Circuit		(Belgium) Frédéric Vervisch	(Belgium) Frédéric Vervisch	(Belgium) Audi Sport Team Comtoyou	Report

== Points standings ==
Scoring system

Position	1st	2nd	3rd	4th	5th	6th	7th	8th	9th	10th	11th	12th	13th	14th	15th
Qualifying	15	10	8	6	4	2	—N/a								
Races	30	25	22	20	18	16	14	12	10	8	6	4	3	2	1

=== Drivers ===
Pos.	Driver	POR (Portugal)		SPA (Belgium)		VAL (Italy)		HUN (Hungary)		ELP (Uruguay)		VIL (Argentina)		SYD (Australia)			BAT (Australia)			MAC (Macau)		Pts.
1	(Hungary) Norbert Michelisz	1^{1}	8	8	2	1^{1}	4	6^{5}	19	6^{4}	7	2^{2}	4	8	4	2	10	1	5	1^{1}	8	440
2	(France) Yann Ehrlacher	7	7	1^{1}	5	5	2	1^{1}	6	5	3	6^{1}	16	6	9	7	4^{2}	5	1	6^{3}	3	430
3	(United Kingdom) Robert Huff	3^{3}	6	5^{6}	10	4^{6}	1	9	2	7^{6}	4	3^{4}	3	4^{5}	2	1	6	4	3	3^{5}	12	414
4	(Belgium) Frédéric Vervisch	4^{4}	3	6	14	15^{4}	3	5	3	3^{5}	5	19	5	5	3	4	7	7	7	5	1	347
5	(Spain) Mikel Azcona	2^{2}	4	16	8	2^{2}	5	3^{4}	4	8	2	1^{3}	Ret	3^{3}	19	6	Ret^{5}	10	Ret	4^{2}	9	341
6	(Argentina) Néstor Girolami	5^{5}	Ret	2^{3}	7	6	8	2^{2}	5	4^{3}	8	Ret	1	10	Ret	8	2^{6}	9	6	2^{4}	6	340
7	(Sweden) Thed Björk	8	2	9	9	3^{3}	6	8	1	2^{2}	9	Ret	6	9	Ret	15	5^{4}	3	2	8	4	320
8	(Uruguay) Santiago Urrutia	Ret	1	3^{5}	4	7^{5}	15	7	18	1^{1}	6	Ret^{5}	11	NC	10	12	1^{3}	6	Ret	9	2	283
9	(China) Ma Qing Hua	6^{6}	10	14^{2}	13	9	13	4^{3}	8	9	1	4^{6}	2	2^{6}	Ret	9	16	13	9	7^{6}	5	265
10	(Australia) Will Brown													1^{2}	1	3	13	Ret	DNS			95
11	(France) John Filippi	9	9	10	1	10	Ret	14	14											10	7	92
12	(Australia) Tony D'Alberto													15	12	10	3^{1}	8	4			82
13	(Netherlands) Tom Coronel	11	5	7	3			11	9													76
14	(Belgium) Kobe Pauwels	10	Ret	4^{4}	Ret	8	11	10	7													74
15	(Australia) Aaron Cameron													7	8	18	9	2	Ret			61
16	(Australia) Josh Buchan													16	5	5	8	11	11			60
17	(Australia) Ben Bargwanna	17	12	Ret	17									18^{1}	NC	NC	Ret	12	10	12	Ret	35
18	(Australia) Bailey Sweeny													14^{4}	6	11	12	Ret	DSQ			34
19	(Italy) Marco Butti					11	7													11	10	34
20	(Argentina) Bernardo Llaver									14	16	8	7									28
21	(Argentina) Esteban Guerrieri									12	10	11	10									26
22	(Argentina) Juan Ángel Rosso									13	11	7	Ret									23
23	(United Kingdom) Tom Oliphant													12	7	13	17	16	14			23
24	(Italy) Kevin Ceccon					13	9	12	11													23
25	(Spain) Felipe Fernández	15	18	13	6																	20
26	(Argentina) Ignacio Montenegro									10	Ret	9	14									20
27	(Argentina) Fabián Yannantuoni									Ret	20	5	Ret									18
28	(Australia) Zac Soutar													Ret	18	17	11	19	8			18
29	(Brazil) Raphael Reis									Ret	15	Ret	8									13
30	(Brazil) Galid Osman									16	17	13	9									13
31	(Australia) Lachlan Mineeff													13	11	14	20	15	15			13
32	(North Macedonia) Viktor Davidovski	13	19	11	16			13	Ret													12
33	(Uruguay) Juan Manuel Casella									11	13	16	13									12
34	(France) Sylvain Pussier					14	10															10
35	(United Kingdom) Lewis Brown	19	16	12	11			17	16													10
36	(Australia) Jordan Cox													11	14	16	14	18	Ret			10
37	(Serbia) Dušan Borković	12	Ret	Ret	15			15	12													10
38	(United Kingdom) Isaac Smith	14	13	15	12																	10
39	(Brazil) Pedro Cardoso									18	22	10	Ret									8
40	(Estonia) Ruben Volt							21†	10													8
41	(China) Deng Baowei																			14	11	8
42	(Spain) Rubén Fernández	18	11	18	18																	6
43	(Uruguay) Frederick Balbi									17	14	12	Ret									6
44	(Australia) Michael Clemente													WD	WD	WD	Ret	14	12			6
45	(Estonia) Mattias Vahtel					12	14															6
46	(Argentina) José Manuel Sapag									19	21	15	12									5
47	(Brazil) Rafael Suzuki									15	12											5
48	(Sweden) Viktor Andersson	21†	14	17	22			20	13													5
49	(France) Aurélien Comte					16	12															4
50	(Australia) Iain McDougall													20	17	21	19	17	13			3
51	(Australia) Brad Harris													17	13	19	18	Ret	DNS			3
52	(Hong Kong) Lo Sze Ho																			13	Ret	3
53	(China) Ken Tian Kai																			Ret	13	3
54	(China) Yan Chuang																			15	14	3
55	(Brazil) Diego Nunes									20	18	14	Ret									2
56	(Sweden) Mikael Karlsson	20†	17	20	19			16	15													1
57	(Italy) Nicola Baldan	16	15																			1
58	(Brazil) Adalberto Baptista									23	23	17	15									1
59	(Australia) Will Harris													21	15	22	WD	WD	WD			1
60	(France) Teddy Clairet																15	DSQ	Ret			1
61	(France) Jimmy Clairet													19	16	20						0
62	(Hong Kong) Paul Poon																			16	Ret	0
63	(Ukraine) Daniel Tkachenko							19	17													0
64	(Hungary) Levente Losonczy			19	21			18	Ret													0
65	(Brazil) Fabio Casagrande									24	24	18	Ret									0
66	(Argentina) Fabricio Pezzini									21	19											0
67	(Denmark) Philip Lindberg			21	20																	0
68	(Uruguay) Gonzalo Reilly									22	Ret											0
69	(Uruguay) Carlos Silva									Ret	25											0
–	(Uruguay) Enrique Maglione									Ret	Ret	Ret	Ret									0
–	(Argentina) Matias Milla											Ret	Ret									0
–	(Australia) Kody Garland													DNS	DNS	DNS	WD	WD	WD			0
–	(Argentina) Damián Fineschi									DNS	DNS											0
–	(Uruguay) Michell Bonnin									DNS	DNS											0
–	(China) Li Wengji																			DNQ	DNQ	0
Pos.	Driver	POR (Portugal)		SPA (Belgium)		VAL (Italy)		HUN (Hungary)		ELP (Uruguay)		VIL (Argentina)		SYD (Australia)			BAT (Australia)			MAC (Macau)		Pts.

Colour	Result
Gold	Winner
Silver	Second place
Bronze	Third place
Green	Points classification
Blue	Non-points classification
Blue	Non-classified finish (NC)
Purple	Retired, not classified (Ret)
Red	Did not qualify (DNQ)
Red	Did not pre-qualify (DNPQ)
Black	Disqualified (DSQ)
White	Did not start (DNS)
White	Withdrew (WD)
White	Race cancelled (C)
Blank	Did not practice (DNP)
Blank	Did not arrive (DNA)
Blank	Excluded (EX)

^{1} ^{2} ^{3} ^{4} ^{5} ^{6} – Points-scoring position in qualifying

† – Drivers did not finish the race, but were classified as they completed over 75% of the race distance.

=== Teams ===
Points are given only to the two highest-classified cars of each team in every race and qualifying.

Pos.	Team	POR (Portugal)		SPA (Belgium)		VAL (Italy)		HUN (Hungary)		ELP (Uruguay)		VIL (Argentina)		SYD (Australia)			BAT (Australia)			MAC (Macau)		Pts.
1	(Sweden) Cyan Racing Lynk & Co	6^{6}	2	1^{1}	4	3^{3}	2	1^{1}	1	1^{1}	1	4^{6}	2	2^{6}	9	7	1^{3}	3	1	6^{3}	2	977
1	(Sweden) Cyan Racing Lynk & Co	7	7	3^{5}	5	5	6	4^{3}	6	2^{2}	3	6^{1}	6	6	10	9	4^{2}	5	2	7^{6}	3	977
2	(Belgium) Audi Sport Team Comtoyou	3^{3}	3	5^{6}	10	4^{6}	1	5	2	3^{5}	4	3^{4}	3	4^{5}	2	1	6	4	3	3^{5}	1	810
2	(Belgium) Audi Sport Team Comtoyou	4^{4}	6	6	14	15^{4}	3	9	3	7^{6}	5	19	5	5	3	4	7	7	7	5	7	810
3	(Italy) BRC Hyundai N Squadra Corse	1^{1}	4	8	2	1^{1}	4	3^{4}	4	6^{4}	2	1^{3}	4	8	4	2	10	1	5	1^{1}	8	805
3	(Italy) BRC Hyundai N Squadra Corse	2^{2}	8	16	8	2^{2}	5	6^{5}	19	8	7	2^{2}	Ret	3^{3}	19	6	Ret^{5}	10	Ret	4^{2}	9	805
4	(Estonia) ALM Motorsport	5^{5}	Ret	2^{3}	7	6	8	2^{2}	5													182
4	(Estonia) ALM Motorsport			21	20	12	14	21†	10													182
5	(Australia) Wall Racing													10	12	8	2^{6}	8	4			169
5	(Australia) Wall Racing													15	Ret	10	3^{1}	9	6			169
6	(Belgium) Comtoyou Racing	10	5	7	3	8	11	10	7													148
6	(Belgium) Comtoyou Racing	11	Ret	4^{4}	Ret			11	9													148
7	(Australia) HMO Customer Racing													14^{4}	5	5	8	11	11			114
7	(Australia) HMO Customer Racing													16	6	11	12	Ret	DSQ			114
8	(Australia) Garry Rogers Motorsport													7	8	18	9	2	10			107
8	(Australia) Garry Rogers Motorsport													11	14	20	14	12	10			107
9	(Australia) Melbourne Performance Centre													1^{2}	1	3	13	Ret	DNS			101
10	(Belgium) Comtoyou	9	9	10	1	10	Ret	13	14													91
10	(Belgium) Comtoyou	13	19	11	16			14	Ret													91
11	(Argentina) Squadra Martino Racing									4^{3}	8	Ret	1									72
12	(Macau) MacPro Racing																			2^{4}	6	51
13	(Argentina) Paladini Racing									10	11	5	Ret									48
13	(Argentina) Paladini Racing									13	19	9	Ret									48
14	(Italy) Aggressive Team Italia	16	15	19	19	13	9	12	11													47
14	(Italy) Aggressive Team Italia	20†	17	20	21			16	15													47
15	(Argentina) Squadra Martino									10	13	9	13									46
15	(Argentina) Squadra Martino									11	24	16	14									46
16	Toyota Team Argentina									14	16	8	7									40
16	Toyota Team Argentina									19	21	15	12									40
17	(Spain) Volcano Motorsport	14	13	12	11			17	16													36
17	(Spain) Volcano Motorsport	19	16	15	12																	36
18	(Argentina) Bratton Tito Bessone Team									12	10	11	10									36
19	(Brazil) W2 ProGP									16	15	13	8									32
19	(Brazil) W2 ProGP									Ret	17	Ret	9									32
20	(Spain) RC2 Racing Team	15	11	13	6																	32
20	(Spain) RC2 Racing Team	18	18	18	18																	32
21	(Australia) Ashley Seward Motorsport													12	7	13	17	16	14			30
22	(France) SP Competition					14	10															24
22	(France) SP Competition					16	12															24
23	(Argentina) PMO Motorsport								15	12	12	Ret										22
23	(Argentina) PMO Motorsport									17	14	Ret	Ret									22
24	(China) 109 Racing																			14	11	20
25	(Australia) Team Soutar Motorsport													Ret	18	17	11	19	8			20
26	(Italy) Target Competition	12	Ret	Ret	15			15	12													18
27	(Australia) Purple Sector													13	11	14	20	15	15			17
28	(China) Fancy Teamwork																			15	14	14
30	(Hong Kong) Evolve Racing																			13	Ret	10
=	(China) QMA Motorsports																			Ret	13	10
31	(Sweden) MA:GP	21†	14	17	22			20	13													11
32	(France) Team Clairet Sport	17	12	Ret	17															12	Ret	9
33	(United Kingdom) Carl Cox Motorsport													WD	WD	WD	Ret	14	12			8
34	(Brazil) Cobra Racing									20	18	14	15									5
34	(Brazil) Cobra Racing									23	23	17	Ret									5
35	(China) Teamwork Motorsport																			16	Ret	4
-	(Argentina) PMO Racing									22	Ret											0
-	(Argentina) PMO Racing									DNS	DNS											0
-	(Brazil) Scuderia Chiarelli									18	22	10	Ret									0
-	(Italy) Alfa Racing									25	Ret											0
-	(Italy) Alfa Racing									DNS	DNS											0
-	(Australia) Challenge Motorsport													20	17	21	19	17	13			0
-	(China) Z.Speed																			DNQ	DNQ	0
Pos.	Team	POR (Portugal)		SPA (Belgium)		VAL (Italy)		HUN (Hungary)		ELP (Uruguay)		VIL (Argentina)		SYD (Australia)			BAT (Australia)			MAC (Macau)		Pts.
