= ALM Motorsport =

Estonian motorsport team

(Estonia) ALM Motorsport
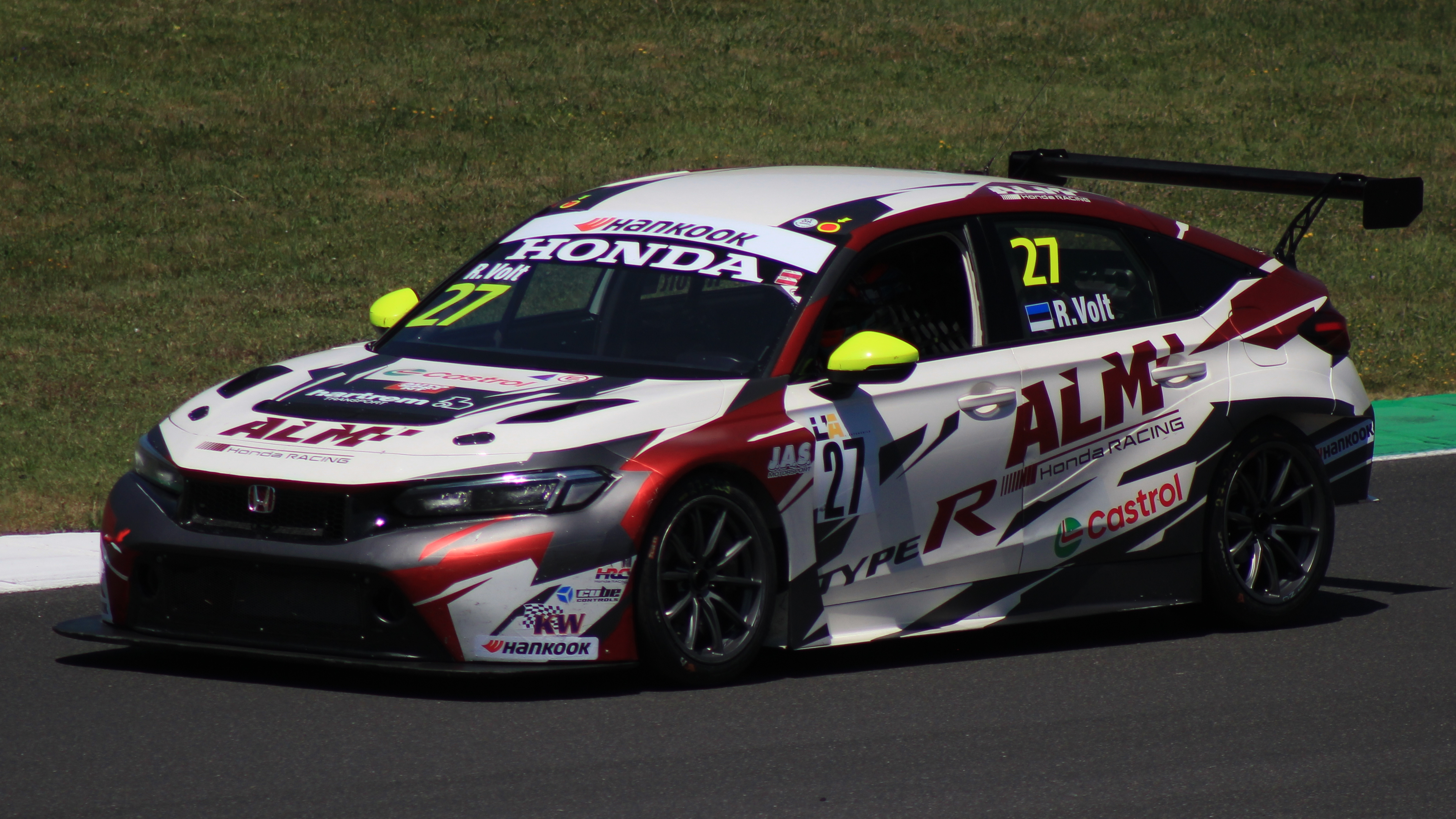
- Team principal(s): (Estonia) Martin Laur
- Current series: TCR World Tour; TCR Italy Touring Car Championship; TCR Europe Touring Car Series; Baltic Touring Car Championship
- Former series: World Rally Championship-2; European Rally Championship; Scandinavian Touring Car Championship; 24H TCE Series; SMP F4 Championship
- Noted drivers: TCR Europe: 23. (Argentina) Ignacio Montenegro; 27. (Estonia) Ruben Volt; 64. (Hungary) Levente Losonczy; TCR Italy: 11. Paolo Rocca; 27. (Estonia) Ruben Volt; 64. (Hungary) Levente Losonczy
- Website: alm.ee

ALM Motorsport is an Estonian-based motorsport team which competes in different racing and rallying series. The team is based in Tallinn, Estonia. ALM Motorsport started in Italian Touring Car Championship in 2021 with three Estonian drivers. In 2023 the team entered into TCR World Tour with Néstor Girolami being the only driver. ALM Motorsport has also competed in European Rally Championship and in World Rally Championship-2 when their driver was Georg Linnamäe who was driving with Volkswagen Polo GTI R5 prepared by the ALM Motorsport.

== Current series results ==
=== TCR Europe Touring Car Series ===
Year	Car	Drivers	Races	Wins	Poles	F/Laps	Podiums	Points	D.C.	T.C.
2019	Honda Civic Type R TCR (FK8)	(Estonia) Robin Vaks	2	0	0	0	0	0	40th	23rd
2019	Honda Civic Type R TCR (FK8)	(Estonia) Mattias Vahtel	2	0	0	0	0	0	54th	23rd
2023	Honda Civic Type R TCR (FL5)	(Estonia) Ruben Volt	8	2	1	3	2	171	9th	8th
2023	Honda Civic Type R TCR (FL5)	(Argentina) Néstor Girolami	6	0	0	1	2	0	NC	8th
2023	Honda Civic Type R TCR (FL5)	(Denmark) Philip Lindberg	2	0	0	0	0	0	NC	8th
2024	Honda Civic Type R TCR (FL5)	(Argentina) Ignacio Montenegro	12	1	1	0	5	342	3rd	1st
2024	Honda Civic Type R TCR (FL5)	(Estonia) Ruben Volt	10	2	0	0	6	269	4th	1st
2024	Honda Civic Type R TCR (FL5)	(Hungary) Levente Losonczy	12	2	0	1	4	256	6th	1st
2025	Honda Civic Type R TCR (FL5)	(Estonia) Ruben Volt	12	2	2	1	3	176	5th	4th
2025	Honda Civic Type R TCR (FL5)	(Germany) René Kircher	4	0	0	0	0	63	15th	4th
2025	Honda Civic Type R TCR (FL5)	(Sweden) Mikael Karlsson	2	0	0	0	0	14	22nd	4th
2025	Honda Civic Type R TCR (FL5)	(Estonia) Sten Dorian Piirimägi	2	0	0	0	0	6	27th	4th
2025	Honda Civic Type R TCR (FL5)	(Turkey) Vedat Ali Dalokay	2	0	0	0	0	2	30th	4th
2025	Honda Civic Type R TCR (FL5)	(Canada) Gary Kwok	2	0	0	0	0	1	32nd	4th
2025	Honda Civic Type R TCR (FL5)	(Estonia) Sven Karuse	2	0	0	0	0	0	34th	4th
2026	Honda Civic Type R TCR (FL5)	(Germany) Mike Halder	12	0	1	0	2	197	2nd	1st
2026	Honda Civic Type R TCR (FL5)	(Estonia) Ruben Volt	12	1	0	2	3	185	4th	1st
2026	Honda Civic Type R TCR (FL5)	(Republic of Ireland) Max Hart	8	0	0	0	0	69	15th	1st
2026	Honda Civic Type R TCR (FL5)	(United Kingdom) Carl Boardley	4	0	0	0	0	20	23rd	1st
2026	Honda Civic Type R TCR (FL5)	(Sweden) Mikael Karlsson	2	0	0	0	0	13	26th	1st
2026	Honda Civic Type R TCR (FL5)	(Denmark) René Povlsen	2	0	0	0	0	12	27th	1st
2026	Honda Civic Type R TCR (FL5)	(Canada) Gary Kwok	2	0	0	0	0	2	33rd	1st

=== TCR Italy Touring Car Championship ===
Year	Car	Drivers	Races	Wins	Poles	F/Laps	Podiums	Points	D.C.	T.C.
2021	Honda Civic Type R TCR (FK8)	(Estonia) Ruben Volt	12	0	0	0	1	181	6th	5th
2021	Honda Civic Type R TCR (FK8)	(Estonia) Mattias Vahtel	10	0	0	1	1	134	9th	5th
2022	Honda Civic Type R TCR (FK8)	(Estonia) Ruben Volt	12	0	1	0	3	241	4th	4th
2022	Honda Civic Type R TCR (FK8)	(Estonia) Mattias Vahtel	12	0	0	2	0	168	10th	4th
2022	Honda Civic Type R TCR (FK8)	(Estonia) Antti Rammo	12	0	0	0	0	109	12th	4th
2023	Honda Civic Type R TCR (FK8)	(Estonia) Mattias Vahtel	4	0	0	0	0	46	NC	7th
2023	Honda Civic Type R TCR (FK8)	(Estonia) Antti Rammo	4	0	0	0	0	8	NC	7th
2023	Honda Civic Type R TCR (FK8)	(Estonia) Ruben Volt	6	0	1	0	0	201	7th	7th
2023	Honda Civic Type R TCR (FL5)	(Estonia) Ruben Volt	6	0	0	0	1	201	7th	7th
2024	Honda Civic Type R TCR (FL5)	(Estonia) Ruben Volt								
2024	Honda Civic Type R TCR (FL5)	(Italy) Paolo Rocca								
2024	Honda Civic Type R TCR (FL5)	(Hungary) Levente Losonczy								

=== TCR World Tour ===
Year	Car	Drivers	Races	Wins	Poles	F/Laps	Podiums	Points	D.C.	T.C.
2023	Honda Civic Type R TCR (FL5)	(Argentina) Néstor Girolami	8	0	0	1	2	340†	6th†	4th
2023	Honda Civic Type R TCR (FL5)	(Estonia) Ruben Volt	2	0	0	0	0	8	20th	4th
2023	Honda Civic Type R TCR (FL5)	(Estonia) Mattias Vahtel	2	0	0	0	0	6	45th	4th
2023	Honda Civic Type R TCR (FL5)	(Denmark) Philip Lindberg	2	0	0	0	0	0	NC	4th
2025	Honda Civic Type R TCR (FL5)	(Estonia) Ruben Volt	5	0	0	0	1	60	13th	6th
2025	Honda Civic Type R TCR (FL5)	(Argentina) Leonel Pernía	2	0	0	0	0	5	35th	6th
2026	Honda Civic Type R TCR (FL5)	(Estonia) Ruben Volt								
2026	Honda Civic Type R TCR (FL5)	(France) Teddy Clairet								
2026	Honda Civic Type R TCR (FL5)	(France) Jimmy Clairet								
2026	Honda Civic Type R TCR (FL5)	(United Kingdom) Jenson Brickley								
2026	Honda Civic Type R TCR (FL5)	(Turkey) Demir Eröge								
2026	Honda Civic Type R TCR (FL5)	(Estonia) Sten Dorian Piirimägi								
2026	Honda Civic Type R TCR (FL5)	(Denmark) René Povlsen								
2026	Honda Civic Type R TCR (FL5)	(Sweden) Mikael Karlsson								

† Shared results with other teams.

== Former series results ==
=== TCR Scandinavia Touring Car Championship ===
Year	Car	Drivers	Races	Wins	Poles	F/Laps	Podiums	Points	D.C.	T.C.
2018	CUPRA León TCR	(Estonia) Andre Kiil	6	0	0	0	0	0	17th	NC

Kiil drove for Brovallen Design in rounds 5 and 6.

=== SMP F4 Championship ===
Year	Car	Drivers	Races	Wins	Poles	F/Laps	Podiums	Points	D.C.
2017	Tatuus F4-T014	(Estonia) Sten Piirimägi	15	0	0	1	0	42	11th
2017	Tatuus F4-T014	(Estonia) Jan-Erik Meikup	12	0	0	0	0	29	12th
