= Mikel Azcona =

Spanish racing driver (born 1996)

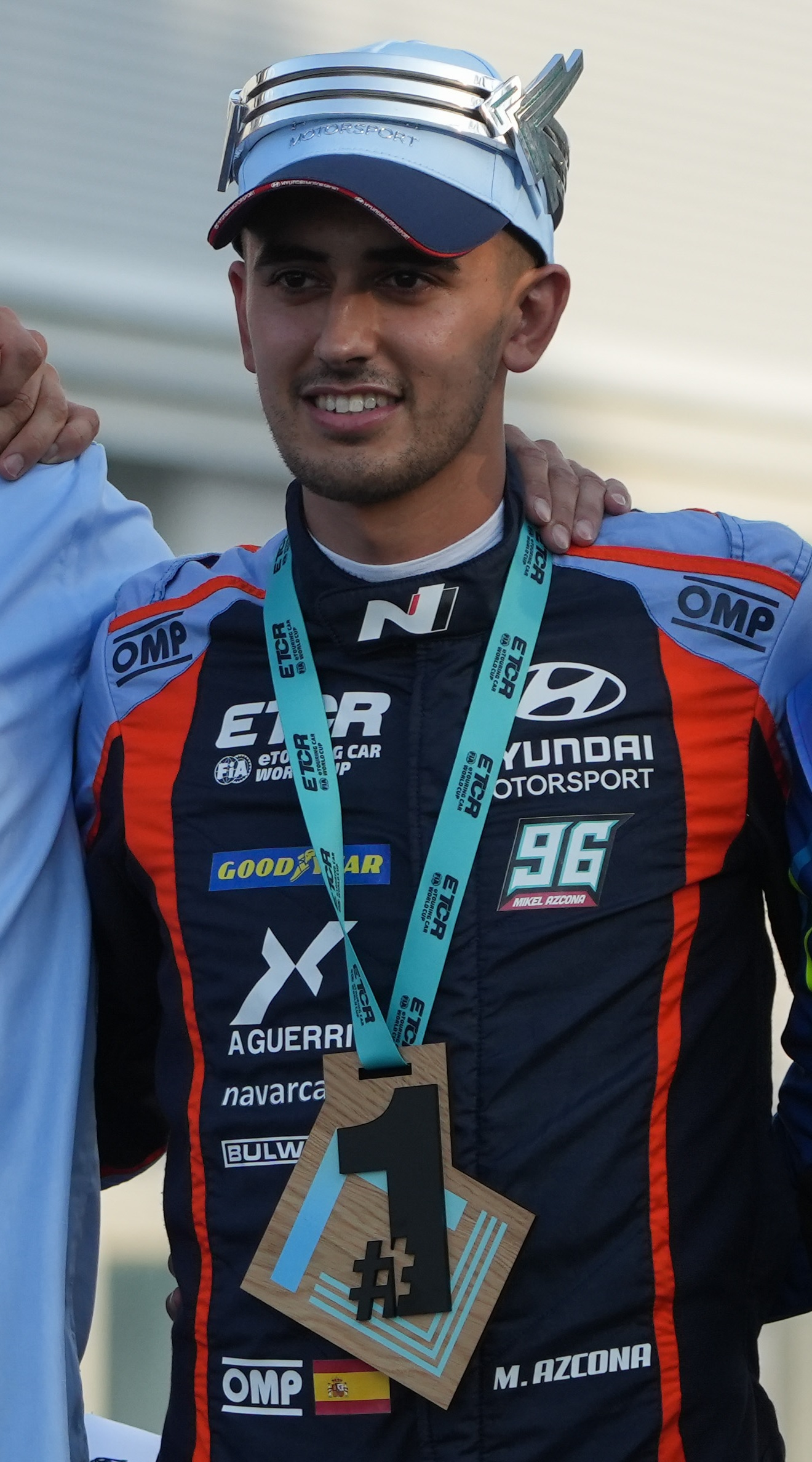
- Azcona at the 2022 WTCR Race of Italy
- Nationality: (Spain) Spanish
- Born: Mikel Azcona Troyas; 25 June 1996 (age 30) Arrigorriaga, Spain

World Touring Car Cup career
- Debut season: 2019
- Current team: BRC Hyundai N Squadra Corse
- Categorisation: FIA Gold
- Car number: 96
- Former teams: PWR Racing, Zengő Motorsport
- Starts: 78
- Wins: 7
- Poles: 3
- Fastest laps: 9
- Best finish: 1st in 2022

Mikel Azcona Troyas (Note: In this Spanish name, the first or paternal surname is Azcona and the second or maternal family name is Troyas.) (born 25 June 1996) is a Spanish auto racing driver who competes in the TCR World Tour for BRC Hyundai N Squadra Corse. He won TCR Europe in 2018 and 2021 for Cupra, and the World Touring Car Cup in 2022 for Hyundai.

== Racing career ==
=== Early career ===
Azcona began his karting career at the age of six with a kart bought by his father. participated in Spanish karting championships where in 2009, he finished second in the Cadet class in the national championship and in the XXI Series, and in 2010, finishing in fourth place in the KF3 class.

In 2012, Azcona made the transition from karting to touring car competitions, since it was where Azcona saw a professional future if he stood out in those races, instead of single-seater competitions. He started at the age of 15 with the car that would compete continuously for the following years, the Renault Clio with which he would participate in Class 2 of the CER together with Diego Rodríguez. He finished that year in third position in the CER Ferodo Sport Challenge. In 2013, he made his debut in the Spanish Renault Clio Cup Spain, where he took his first victory as a professional racer and finished in ninth place in the standings. That same year, he managed to prevail in the Clio class of the Open Cup of Circuito de Navarra.

=== Move to Europe ===
The following year, Azcona joined PCR Sport and finished fifth in Renault Clio Cup Spain. Within Joaquín Rodrigo's team, he competed in the last of the four seasons of the Renault Clio Eurocup, where finished runner-up in 2012 and 2014, behind compatriot Oscar Nogués. Also in 2014, he would have his first endurance test, participating in the Maxi Endurance 32H with two different teams. In 2015, he continued in Renault Clio Cup Spain where he finished second and made his debut in the Seat Léon Eurocup, winning at Circuit Paul Ricard and took three additional podiums, finishing third in the season. He continued in the Seat Léon Eurocup in the 2016 season. He won four races and eight podiums, but they were not enough to become champion and he was runner-up behind Niels Langeveld. He also made four appearances in Renault Clio Cup Spain, winning two of them and finished fifth in the drivers standings. In these two years he was signed to PCR Sport.

In 2017, Azcona participated in the Audi Sport TT Cup, winning six races during the season: two at the Norisring, one at Zandvoort, two at Nürburgring and one at Hockenheimring and finished in second place three times. He finished runner-up in the standings behind Philip Ellis, who had achieved two more podiums than Azcona.

=== TCR Series ===
==== Cupra (2018–2021) ====
The following year, Azcona went on to compete in the TCR Europe, returning to the PCR Sport team and drove a Cupra León, he took a win at Zandvoort, five podium finishes and ten top-five finishes. His regularity allowed him to beat Jean-Karl Vernay to finally get his first title. For the 2019 season, he moved to the World Touring Car Cup with a Cupra León from PWR Racing, becoming the brand's official driver. He obtained his first victory at Vila Real. and finished sixth in the drivers' standings.

Azcona was the subject of controversy at the final race of the 2019 WTCR season in Malaysia after influencing the outcome of the championship. While trying to overtake title contender Esteban Guerrieri for the race lead, he hit Guerrieri's car, pushing him off the track from a title-clinching position and forcing him to pit, which cost him the chance to win the title. Azcona was given a 30-second time penalty for the incident.

In 2021, Azcona also completed a WTCR-European double program, also contesting the first season of the ETCR and completing other national championship races in Spain, Italy and Germany. In the WTCR, he finished in seventh in the final classification, after a somewhat weak start to the season and only achieving a victory in the penultimate race. In the European championship, however, he managed to dominate the season despite missing the third round held at the Zandvoort circuit. By proclaiming himself the winner of the championship in the race on Saturday in Barcelona, Azcona flew to the Czech Republic that same day to be able to compete the two WTCR races in Most the following day.

==== Hyundai (2022–) ====
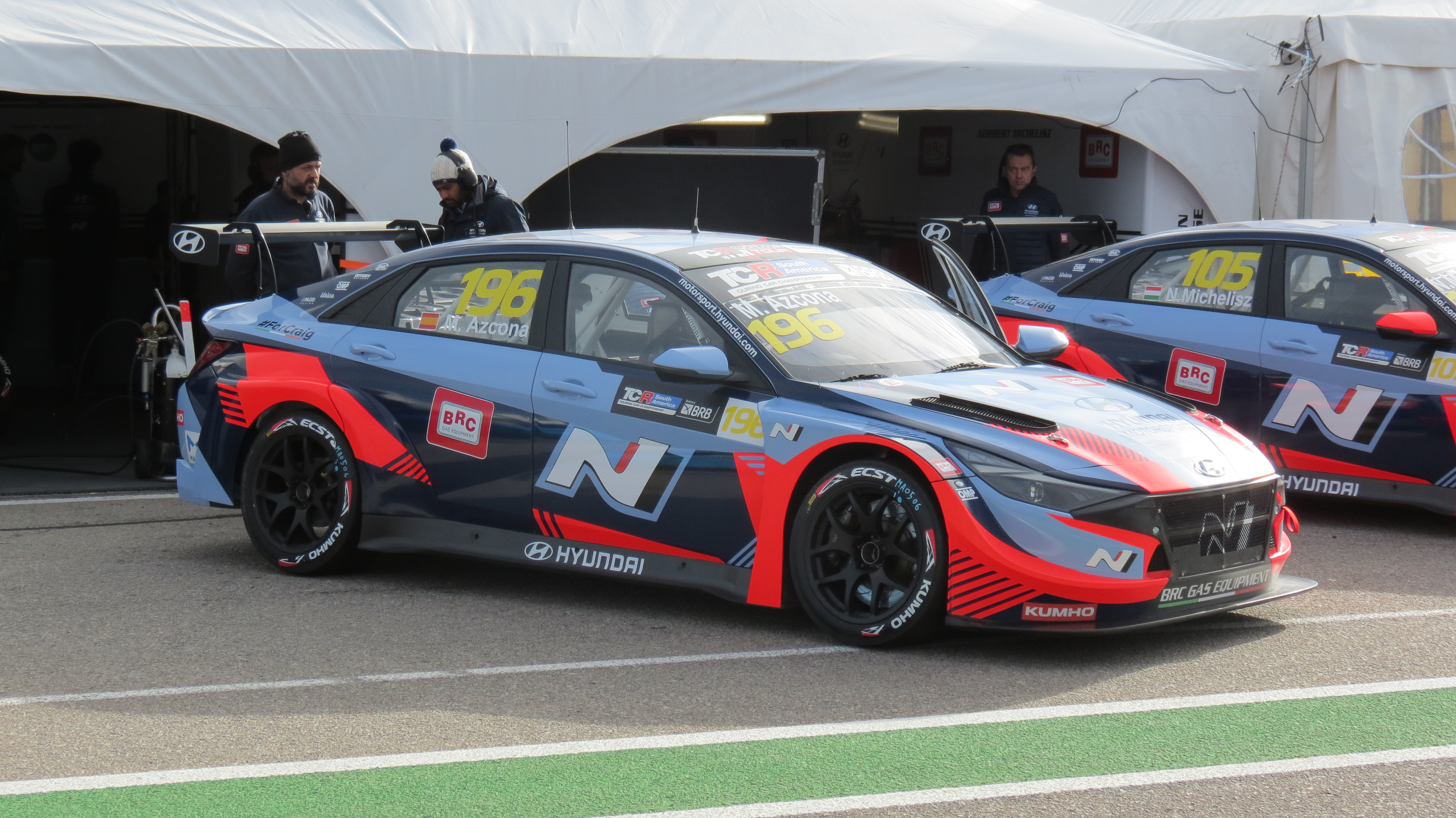
Azcona's Hyundai Elantra N TCR during the 2023 El Pinar TCR World Tour round

In 2022, Azcona changed scenery by signing as an official driver for Hyundai Motorsport, his main focus was winning the WTCR championship, a milestone that would be somewhat marred by the withdrawal of the Lynk & Co team in halfway in the season, the controversies with the failures of the Goodyear tires and the cancellation of several of the final rounds for various reasons. At the same time, he returned to participate in the ETCR where this time he finished in fifth place, achieving only one victory in Vallelunga and managed to win in the TCR category of the 24 Hours of Nürburgring. Azcona clinched the WTCR Drivers' championship during the qualifying session of the FIA WTCR Race of Saudi Arabia making him the last driver to do so.

== Racing record ==
=== Career summary ===
Season	Series	Team	Races	Wins	Podiums	Points	Position
2013	Renault Clio Cup Spain		3	1	1	104	9th
2014	Renault Clio Cup Spain		?	?	?	197	5th
2014	Acceleration - MW-V6 Pickup Series	Team Spain	3	0	2	36	11th
2014	Renault Clio Eurocup	Joaquin Rodrigo Competicion	8	2	4	121	**2nd**
2015	Renault Clio Cup Spain		?	?	?	265	**2nd**
2015	SEAT Leon Eurocup	PCR Sport	14	1	4	66	**3rd**
2016	SEAT Leon Eurocup	PCR Sport	14	4	8	226	**2nd**
2016	Renault Clio Cup Spain	PCR Sport	4	2	3	63	5th
2017	Audi Sport TT Cup	N/A	13	6	9	235	**2nd**
2018	TCR Europe Touring Car Series	PCR Sport	14	1	5	181	**1st**
2019	World Touring Car Cup	PWR Racing	30	1	5	226	6th
2019	Campeonato de España de Resistencia	Tecnicars Racing Team	5	3	3	136	8th
2019	TCR Spa 500	TOPCAR Sport with Bas Koeten Racing	1	0	0	N/A	**3rd**
2020	World Touring Car Cup	Zengő Motorsport Services KFT	16	1	2	168	7th
2020	TCR Europe Touring Car Series	Volcano Motorsport	4	3	3	157	11th
2020	Campeonato de España de Resistencia	Volcano Motorsport	6	4	6	232	**2nd**
2020	TCR Italy Touring Car Championship	Scuderia del Girasole Cupra Racing	2	2	2	52	14th
2021	World Touring Car Cup	Zengő Motorsport	16	1	5	158	7th
2021	TCR Europe Touring Car Series	Volcano Motorsport	11	6	9	432	**1st**
2021	TCR Italy Touring Car Championship	Volcano Motorsport	2	1	1	0	NC†
2021	Pure ETCR Championship	Zengő Motorsport X Cupra	5	2	3	300	**3rd**
2021	24 Hours of Nürburgring - TCR	mathilda racing	1	0	0	N/A	DNF
2022	World Touring Car Cup	BRC Hyundai N Lukoil Squadra Corse	16	4	11	337	**1st**
2022	FIA ETCR – eTouring Car World Cup	Hyundai Motorsport N	6	1	1	408	5th
2022	24 Hours of Nürburgring - TCR	Hyundai Motorsport N	1	1	1	N/A	**1st**
2022	TCR South America Touring Car Championship	Scuderia Chiarelli	1	0	1	62	25th
2022–23	Formula E	NIO 333 Racing	Test driver				
2023	TCR World Tour	BRC Hyundai N Squadra Corse	20	1	6	341	5th
2023	TCR Europe Touring Car Series	BRC Hyundai N Squadra Corse	6	0	2	0	NC†
2023	TCR Italy Touring Car Championship	BRC Hyundai N Squadra Corse	2	0	1	0	NC†
2023	TCR South America Touring Car Championship	BRC Hyundai N Squadra Corse	4	1	2	0	NC†
2023	TCR Australia Touring Car Series	BRC Hyundai N Squadra Corse	6	0	0	0	NC†
2023	24 Hours of Nürburgring - TCR	Hyundai Motorsport N	1	1	1	N/A	**1st**
2023–24	Formula E	ERT Formula E Team	Test driver				
2024	TCR World Tour	BRC Hyundai N Squadra Corse	14	1	4	295	**3rd**
2024	TCR Italy Touring Car Championship	BRC Hyundai N Squadra Corse	2	0	0	0	NC†
2024	TCR South America Touring Car Championship	BRC Hyundai N Squadra Corse	4	0	1	89	20th
2024	Nürburgring Langstrecken-Serie - TCR	Hyundai Motorsport N					
2024	24 Hours of Nürburgring - TCR	Hyundai Motorsport N					
2025	TCR World Tour	BRC Hyundai N Squadra Corse	20	1	4	273	9th
2025	TCR Australia Touring Car Series	BRC Hyundai N Squadra Corse	4	0	2	0	NC†
2025	Porsche Supercup	Hadeca Racing	8	0	0	36	13th
2025	Porsche Carrera Cup Germany	Hadeca Racing	6	0	0	0	NC†
2025	Nürburgring Langstrecken-Serie - TCR	Hyundai Motorsport N					
2026	TCR World Tour	BRC Hyundai N Squadra Corse	18	5	9	445	**1st***
2026	Nürburgring Langstrecken-Serie - SP4T	Hyundai Motorsport N					
2026	Nürburgring Langstrecken-Serie - TCR	Hyundai Motorsport N					

^{†} As Azcona was a guest driver, he was ineligible to score points.

=== Complete TCR Europe Touring Car Series results ===
(key) (Races in bold indicate pole position) (Races in italics indicate fastest lap)

Year	Team	Car	1	2	3	4	5	6	7	8	9	10	11	12	13	14	DC	Points
2018	PCR Sport	CUPRA León TCR	LEC; 1; 3^{2}	LEC; 2; 5	ZAN; 1; 1^{2}	ZAN; 2; 6	SPA; 1; 3^{4}	SPA; 2; 4	**HUN**; **1**; 4^{1}	HUN; 2; 14	ASS; 1; 9	ASS; 2; 2	MNZ; 1; 2^{2}	MNZ; 2; 5	CAT; 1; 5^{3}	CAT; 2; 8	1st	181
2020	Volcano Motorsport	CUPRA León TCR	LEC; 1	LEC; 2	ZOL; 1	ZOL; 2	MNZ; 1	MNZ; 2	CAT; 1	CAT; 2	SPA; 1; 1	SPA; 2; 1	**JAR**; **1**; 1^{1}	JAR; 2; 4			11th	157
2021	Volcano Motorsport	CUPRA León Competición TCR	SVK; 1; 1	SVK; 2; 2	LEC; 1; 6	LEC; 2; 2	ZAN; 1	ZAN; 2	SPA; 1; 1	SPA; 2; 1	NÜR; 1; 1	NÜR; 2; 1	MNZ; 1; 2	MNZ; 2; 4	**CAT**; **1**; 1	CAT; 2 WD	1st	432
2023	BRC Hyundai N Squadra Corse	Hyundai Elantra N TCR	ALG; 1; 2	ALG; 2; 4	PAU; 1	PAU; 2	SPA; 1; 16	SPA; 2; 8	HUN; 1; 3	HUN; 2; 4	LEC; 1	LEC; 2	MNZ; 1	MNZ; 2	CAT; 1	CAT; 2	NC‡	0‡

^{‡} Driver was a World Tour full-time entry and was ineligible for points.

=== Complete World Touring Car Cup results ===
(key) (Races in bold indicate pole position) (Races in italics indicate fastest lap)

Year	Team	Car	1	2	3	4	5	6	7	8	9	10	11	12	13	14	15	16	17	18	19	20	21	22	23	24	25	26	27	28	29	30	DC	Points
2019	PWR Racing	CUPRA León TCR	MAR; 1; 15	MAR; 2; 5	MAR; 3; 3	HUN; 1; 22	HUN; 2; 4	HUN; 3; 4	SVK; 1; 9	SVK; 2; 7	SVK; 3; 5	NED; 1; 3	NED; 2; 5	NED; 3; 6	GER; 1; 18	GER; 2; 13	GER; 3; 13	POR; 1; 12	POR; 2; 1	POR; 3; 4	CHN; 1; 3	CHN; 2 Ret	CHN; 3 Ret	JPN; 1; 17	JPN; 2; 8	JPN; 3; 18	MAC; 1; 19	MAC; 2; 15	MAC; 3; 20	MAL; 1; 17	MAL; 2; 2	MAL; 3; 14	6th	226
2020	Zengő Motorsport Services KFT	CUPRA León Competición TCR	BEL; 1; 16	BEL; 2; 11	GER; 1 Ret	GER; 2; 4	SVK; 1; 8	SVK; 2; 4	SVK; 3; 5	HUN; 1; 6	HUN; 2 Ret	HUN; 3; 4	ESP; 1; 4	ESP; 2; 1	ESP; 3; 7	ARA; 1; 5	ARA; 2; 3	ARA; 3; 5															7th	168
2021	Zengő Motorsport	CUPRA León Competición TCR	GER; 1; 16	GER; 2 Ret	POR; 1; 10	POR; 2 Ret	ESP; 1; 2	ESP; 2; 11	HUN; 1; 2	HUN; 2; 3	CZE; 1; 7	**CZE**; **2**; 2	FRA; 1; 13	FRA; 2; 14	ITA; 1; 11	ITA; 2; 11	RUS; 1; 1	RUS; 2 Ret															7th	158
2022	BRC Hyundai N Squadra Corse	Hyundai Elantra N TCR	FRA; 1; 6	FRA; 2; 1	GER; 1 C	GER; 2 C	**HUN**; **1**; 1	HUN; 2; 8	ESP; 1; 3	ESP; 2; 1	POR; 1; 8	POR; 2; 3	ITA; 1; 2	ITA; 2; 3	ALS; 1; 3	ALS; 2; 3	**BHR**; **1**; 1	BHR; 2; 4	SAU; 1; 6	SAU; 2; 3													1st	337

=== TCR Spa 500 results ===
Year	Team	Co-Drivers	Car	Class	Laps	Pos.	Class Pos.
2019	(Switzerland) TOPCAR Sport with Bas Koeten Racing	(Switzerland) Julien Apotheloz (Switzerland) Fabian Danz (Finland) Antti Buri (Finland) Kari-Pekka Laaksonen	CUPRA León TCR	**P**	444	**3rd**	**3rd**

=== Complete TCR World Tour results ===
(key) (Races in bold indicate pole position) (Races in italics indicate fastest lap)

Year	Team	Car	1	2	3	4	5	6	7	8	9	10	11	12	13	14	15	16	17	18	19	20	21	DC	Points
2023	BRC Hyundai N Squadra Corse	Hyundai Elantra N TCR	ALG; 1; 2	ALG; 2; 4	SPA; 1; 16	SPA; 2; 8	VAL; 1; 2	VAL; 2; 5	HUN; 1; 3	HUN; 2; 4	ELP; 1; 8	ELP; 2; 2	VIL; 1; 1	VIL; 2 Ret	SYD; 1; 3	SYD; 2; 19	SYD; 3; 6	BAT; 1 Ret	BAT; 2; 10	BAT; 3 Ret	MAC; 1; 4	MAC; 2; 9		5th	341
2024	BRC Hyundai N Squadra Corse	Hyundai Elantra N TCR	VAL; 1; 4^{4}	VAL; 2; 4	MRK; 1; 5^{6}	MRK; 2; 13	**MOH**; **1**; 3^{1}	MOH; 2; 4	SAP; 1; 8	SAP; 2; 9	ELP; 1; 2^{2}	ELP; 2; 5	ZHZ; 1; 1^{4}	ZHZ; 2; 9	MAC; 1; 3^{2}	MAC; 2; 6								3rd	295
2025	BRC Hyundai N Squadra Corse	Hyundai Elantra N TCR	AHR; 1; 10	AHR; 2; 17	AHR; 3; 22	CRT; 1; 16	CRT; 2; 7	CRT; 3; 9	MNZ; 1; 10	MNZ; 2; 11	CVR; 1; 11	CVR; 2; 5	BEN; 1 C	**BEN**; **2**; 2	BEN; 3; 10	INJ; 1; 10	INJ; 2; 1	INJ; 3; 4	ZHZ; 1; 7	ZHZ; 2; 2	ZHZ; 3; 10	MAC; 1; 2	MAC; 2; 13	9th	273
2026	BRC Hyundai N Squadra Corse	Hyundai Elantra N EV TCR	**MIS**; **1**; 2	MIS; 2; 2	CRT; 1; 19	CRT; 2; 5	CRT; 3; 3	**LEC**; **1**; 1	LEC; 2; 4	**CVR**; **1**; 2	CVR; 2; 12	**INJ**; **1**; 1	INJ; 2; 7	INJ; 3; 1	CHE; 1; 4	CHE; 2; 7	CHE; 3; 4	ZHZ; 1; 1	ZHZ; 2; 14	ZHZ; 3; 1	MAC; 1	MAC; 2		1st*	455*

^{*} Season still in progress.

=== Complete Porsche Supercup results ===
(key) (Races in bold indicate pole position) (Races in italics indicate fastest lap)

Year	Team	1	2	3	4	5	6	7	8	Pos.	Points
2025	Hadeca Racing	IMO; 7	MON; 5‡	CAT; 14	RBR; 10	SPA; 11	HUN; Ret	ZND; 9	MNZ; 16	13th	36

^{‡} Half points awarded as less than 75% of race distance was completed.

== Notes ==
Sporting positions
Preceded by Inaugural	TCR Europe Touring Car Series; Champion; 2018	Succeeded by Josh Files
Preceded by Mehdi Bennani	TCR Europe Touring Car Series; Champion; 2021	Succeeded by Franco Girolami
Preceded by Yann Ehrlacher	World Touring Car Cup; Champion; 2022	Succeeded by Norbert Michelisz (TCR World Tour)
