= 2022 TCR Europe Touring Car Series =

European motorsport championship

The 2022 TCR Europe Touring Car Series was the sixth season of TCR Europe Touring Car Series. The season began at the Algarve International Circuit in May and ended at the Circuit de Barcelona-Catalunya in October.

== Calendar ==
The calendar was announced with 7 rounds scheduled.

Rnd.		Circuit/Location	Date	Supporting
1	1	Algarve International Circuit, Portimão, Portugal	29 April–1 May	Deutsche Tourenwagen Masters; F4 Spanish Championship
1	2	Algarve International Circuit, Portimão, Portugal	29 April–1 May	Deutsche Tourenwagen Masters; F4 Spanish Championship
2	3	Circuit Paul Ricard, Le Castellet, France	21–22 May	International GT Open; Euroformula Open
2	4	Circuit Paul Ricard, Le Castellet, France	21–22 May	International GT Open; Euroformula Open
3	5	Circuit de Spa-Francorchamps, Stavelot, Belgium	17–19 June	International GT Open; Euroformula Open; Italian F4 Championship
3	6	Circuit de Spa-Francorchamps, Stavelot, Belgium	17–19 June	International GT Open; Euroformula Open; Italian F4 Championship
4	7	Norisring, Nuremberg, Germany	1–3 July	Deutsche Tourenwagen Masters; DTM Trophy
4	8	Norisring, Nuremberg, Germany	1–3 July	Deutsche Tourenwagen Masters; DTM Trophy
5	9	Nürburgring, Nürburg, Germany	26–28 August	Deutsche Tourenwagen Masters; DTM Trophy
5	10	Nürburgring, Nürburg, Germany	26–28 August	Deutsche Tourenwagen Masters; DTM Trophy
6	11	Autodromo Nazionale Monza, Monza, Italy	23–25 September	International GT Open; Euroformula Open
6	12	Autodromo Nazionale Monza, Monza, Italy	23–25 September	International GT Open; Euroformula Open
7	13	Circuit de Barcelona-Catalunya, Montmeló, Spain	14–16 October	International GT Open; Euroformula Open
7	14	Circuit de Barcelona-Catalunya, Montmeló, Spain	14–16 October	International GT Open; Euroformula Open

== Teams and drivers ==
Kumho is the new official tire supplier.

Team	Car	No.	Drivers	Class	Rounds
(Italy) Élite Motorsport by Comtoyou	Audi RS 3 LMS TCR (2021)	2	(Portugal) Luís Cidade	R	1
(Italy) Élite Motorsport by Comtoyou	Audi RS 3 LMS TCR (2021)	111	(Italy) Marco Butti	R	3–7
(Belgium) Audi Sport Team Comtoyou	Audi RS 3 LMS TCR (2021)	22	(Belgium) Frédéric Vervisch		7
(Belgium) Audi Sport Team Comtoyou DHL	Audi RS 3 LMS TCR (2021)	33	(Netherlands) Tom Coronel		1–3, 5–7
(Belgium) Audi Sport Team Comtoyou DHL	Audi RS 3 LMS TCR (2021)	39	(Norway) Stian Paulsen		4
(North Macedonia) Audi Sport Team Comtoyou PSS	Audi RS 3 LMS TCR (2021)	72	(Argentina) Franco Girolami		All
(North Macedonia) Audi Sport Team Comtoyou PSS	Audi RS 3 LMS TCR (2021)	110	(North Macedonia) Viktor Davidovski	Y	All
(Slovenia) Scuderia Ghermandi by Lema Racing	Cupra León Competición TCR	3	(Italy) Giacomo Ghermandi	Y	All
(Czech Republic) Hyundai N Janík Motorsport	Hyundai Elantra N TCR	4	(Slovakia) Samuel Sládečka		7
(Czech Republic) Hyundai N Janík Motorsport	Hyundai Elantra N TCR	24	(Czech Republic) Jáchym Galáš		All
(Czech Republic) Hyundai N Janík Motorsport	Hyundai Elantra N TCR	70	(Slovakia) Maťo Homola		1–5
(Czech Republic) Hyundai N Janík Motorsport	Hyundai Elantra N TCR	73	(Czech Republic) Václav Janík		6
(Germany) Profi-Car Team Halder	Honda Civic Type R TCR (FK8)	7	(Germany) Mike Halder		1–4, 6–7
(Germany) Profi-Car Team Halder	Honda Civic Type R TCR (FK8)	53	(Germany) Michelle Halder		All
(Germany) Profi-Car Team Halder	Honda Civic Type R TCR (FK8)	62	(United Kingdom) Jack Young		All
(Italy) Hyundai N Team Target	Hyundai Elantra N TCR	8	(Italy) Nicola Baldan		All
(Italy) Hyundai N Team Target	Hyundai Elantra N TCR	44	(Italy) Felice Jelmini		1–6
(Italy) Hyundai N Team Target	Hyundai Elantra N TCR	99	(United Kingdom) Josh Files		All
(Italy) BF Motorsport	Audi RS 3 LMS TCR (2021)	9	(Italy) Matteo Poloni	Y	6
(Spain) Hyundai N Teo Martín Motorsport	Hyundai Elantra N TCR	10	(Spain) Alejandro Geppert	R	7
(Italy) MM Motorsport	Honda Civic Type R TCR (FK8)	11	(Italy) Paolo Rocca	R	6
(Spain) RC2 Junior Team	Audi RS 3 LMS TCR (2021)	12	(Spain) Rubén Fernández	Y	3–4, 6–7
(Spain) RC2 Junior Team	Cupra León Competición TCR	19	(Spain) Felipe Fernández	Y	3, 6–7
(Spain) RC2 Junior Team	Cupra León Competición TCR	37	(Venezuela) Sergio López Bolotin		3–4, 6–7
(Spain) Volcano Motorsport	Cupra León Competición TCR	14	(Fédération Internationale de l'Automobile) Klim Gavrilov (Note: Evgeni Leonov and Klim Gavrilov are Russian, but competes as a neutral competitor using the Fédération Internationale de l'Automobile flag as Belarusian and Russian national emblems were banned by the association due to the Russian invasion of Ukraine.)		All
(Spain) Volcano Motorsport	Cupra León Competición TCR	16	(Fédération Internationale de l'Automobile) Evgeni Leonov	Y	All
(Spain) Volcano Motorsport	Cupra León Competición TCR	26	(Spain) Isidro Callejas		All
(Spain) Volcano Motorsport	Cupra León Competición TCR	124	(Portugal) Gustavo Moura	R	1
(Lithuania) NORDPASS Juta Racing	Hyundai i30 N TCR	15	(Lithuania) Jonas Karklys		5
(Slovakia) Brutal Fish Racing Team	Honda Civic Type R TCR (FK8)	17	(Slovakia) Martin Ryba	Y	1–3
(Slovakia) Brutal Fish Racing Team	Honda Civic Type R TCR (FK8)	74	(Spain) Pepe Oriola		1–3
(Italy) Hyundai N Team Aggressive Italia	Hyundai Elantra N TCR	74	(Spain) Pepe Oriola		4–7
(Italy) Hyundai N Team Aggressive Italia	Hyundai Elantra N TCR	64	(Hungary) Levente Losonczy	R	6
(France) Sébastien Loeb Racing Bardhal Team	Cupra León Competición TCR	27	(France) John Filippi		All
(Germany) RaceSing	Hyundai i30 N TCR	34	(Germany) Patrick Sing		4–5
(France) Team Clairet Sport	Cupra León TCR	66	(France) Gilles Colombani	Y	2
(France) Team Clairet Sport	Cupra León Competición TCR	81	(France) Stéphane Ventaja	Y	2
(Italy) CRM Motorsport	Hyundai i30 N TCR	144	(Italy) Michele Imberti		6

Icon	Class
R	Eligible for TCR Europe Rookie Trophy
Y	Eligible for TCR Europe Diamond Trophy
G	Guest drivers ineligible to score points

== Results and standings ==
=== Season summary ===
Rnd.		Circuit/Location	Pole position	Fastest lap	Winning driver	Winning team	Winning Rookie driver	Winning Diamond driver
1	1	(Portugal) Algarve International Circuit	(Germany) Mike Halder	(Spain) Isidro Callejas	(United Kingdom) Jack Young	(Germany) Profi-Car Team Halder	(Portugal) Luís Cidade	(North Macedonia) Viktor Davidovski
1	2	(Portugal) Algarve International Circuit		(Argentina) Franco Girolami	(Argentina) Franco Girolami	(North Macedonia) Comtoyou PSS Team Audi Sport	(Portugal) Luís Cidade	(North Macedonia) Viktor Davidovski
2	3	(France) Circuit Paul Ricard	(Netherlands) Tom Coronel	(Netherlands) Tom Coronel	(Netherlands) Tom Coronel	(Belgium) Comtoyou DHL Team Audi Sport	(Czech Republic) Jáchym Galáš	(North Macedonia) Viktor Davidovski
2	4	(France) Circuit Paul Ricard		(North Macedonia) Viktor Davidovski	(North Macedonia) Viktor Davidovski	(North Macedonia) Comtoyou PSS Team Audi Sport	(Czech Republic) Jáchym Galáš	(North Macedonia) Viktor Davidovski
3	5	(Belgium) Circuit de Spa-Francorchamps	(Argentina) Franco Girolami	(Argentina) Franco Girolami	(Spain) Isidro Callejas	(Spain) Volcano Motorsport	(Czech Republic) Jáchym Galáš	(Fédération Internationale de l'Automobile) Evgeni Leonov
3	6	(Belgium) Circuit de Spa-Francorchamps		(Spain) Isidro Callejas	(Czech Republic) Jáchym Galáš	(Czech Republic) Hyundai N Janík Motorsport	(Czech Republic) Jáchym Galáš	(Fédération Internationale de l'Automobile) Evgeni Leonov
4	7	(Germany) Norisring	(Germany) Mike Halder	(Argentina) Franco Girolami	(Germany) Mike Halder	(Germany) Profi-Car Team Halder	(Italy) Marco Butti	(North Macedonia) Viktor Davidovski
4	8	(Germany) Norisring		(Italy) Marco Butti	(Argentina) Franco Girolami	(North Macedonia) Comtoyou PSS Team Audi Sport	(Italy) Marco Butti	(North Macedonia) Viktor Davidovski
5	9	(Germany) Nürburgring	(Netherlands) Tom Coronel	(Netherlands) Tom Coronel	(Netherlands) Tom Coronel	(Belgium) Comtoyou DHL Team Audi Sport	(Italy) Marco Butti	(Fédération Internationale de l'Automobile) Evgeni Leonov
5	10	(Germany) Nürburgring		Race cancelled				
6	11	(Italy) Autodromo Nazionale Monza	(France) John Filippi	(United Kingdom) Jack Young	(France) John Filippi	(France) Sébastien Loeb Racing Bardhal Team	(Italy) Marco Butti	(Spain) Felipe Fernández
6	12	(Italy) Autodromo Nazionale Monza		(United Kingdom) Jack Young	(Argentina) Franco Girolami	(North Macedonia) Comtoyou PSS Team Audi Sport	(Italy) Marco Butti	(Spain) Felipe Fernández
7	13	(Spain) Circuit de Barcelona-Catalunya	(United Kingdom) Jack Young	(United Kingdom) Jack Young	(United Kingdom) Jack Young	(Germany) Profi-Car Team Halder	(Italy) Marco Butti	(North Macedonia) Viktor Davidovski
7	14	(Spain) Circuit de Barcelona-Catalunya		(Argentina) Franco Girolami	(Argentina) Franco Girolami	(North Macedonia) Comtoyou PSS Team Audi Sport	(Italy) Marco Butti	(North Macedonia) Viktor Davidovski

==== Drivers' standings ====
Scoring system

Position	**1st**	**2nd**	**3rd**	**4th**	**5th**	**6th**	**7th**	**8th**	**9th**	**10th**	**11th**	**12th**	**13th**	**14th**	**15th**
Q1	6	5	4	3	2	1									
Q2	10	9	8	7	6	5	4	3	2	1					
Race	40	35	30	27	24	21	18	15	13	11	9	7	5	3	1

Pos.	Driver	POR (Portugal)		LEC (France)		SPA (Belgium)		NOR (Germany)		NÜR (Germany)		MNZ (Italy)		BAR (Spain)		Points
Pos.	Driver	RD1	RD2	RD1	RD2	RD1	RD2	RD1	RD2	RD1	RD2	RD1	RD2	RD1	RD2	Points
1	(Argentina) Franco Girolami	5	1	2	4	**2**	4	3	1	3	C	12	1	3	1	431
2	(Netherlands) Tom Coronel	8	3	**1**	5	5	3			**1**	C	13	8	2	2	316
3	(United Kingdom) Josh Files	6	5	8	17	3	5	2	3	6	C	5	9	9	19	285
4	(Spain) Isidro Callejas	4	8	11	7	1	7	5	5	10	C	8	NC	5	6	275
5	(Fédération Internationale de l'Automobile) Klim Gavrilov	7	6	5	2	6	8	12	2	Ret	C	9	2	12	16	256
6	(United Kingdom) Jack Young	1	11	19	13	8	6	10	6	Ret	C	11	7	**1**	5	246
7	(Italy) Nicola Baldan	3	15	9	10	4	12	13	11	2	C	4	4	7	8	245
8	(Germany) Mike Halder	**2**	9	10	Ret	13	13	**1**	7			3	12	10	4	228
9	(Czech Republic) Jáchym Galáš	11	7	12	9	9	1	11	8	7	C	2	13	6	10	224
10	(France) John Filippi	10	4	4	6	12	15	7	10	9	C	**1**	22	11	Ret	202
11	(Spain) Pepe Oriola	9	2	7	3	Ret	10	Ret	12	4	C	7	10	8	Ret	185
12	(North Macedonia) Viktor Davidovski	13	10	6	1	11	Ret	4	4	14	C	16	14	15	9	169
13	(Italy) Felice Jelmini	15	16	3	8	7	9	9	Ret	5	C	10	23			156
14	(Slovakia) Maťo Homola	12	18	18	18	Ret	2	6	9	Ret	C					79
15	(Italy) Marco Butti					15	18	Ret	18	8	C	6	11	13	7	78
16	(Belgium) Frédéric Vervisch													4	3	57
17	(Fédération Internationale de l'Automobile) Evgeni Leonov	17	Ret	17	12	10	11	Ret	16	13	C	18	20	18	12	39
18	(Venezuela) Sergio López					17	17	15	19			22	3	17	13	37
19	(Spain) Felipe Fernández					14	Ret					14	6	Ret	18	27
20	(Italy) Michele Imberti											21	5			24
21	(Germany) Michelle Halder	14	14	16	15	16	14	16	13	Ret	C	Ret	18	16	Ret	19
22	(Norway) Stian Paulsen							8	14							18
23	(France) Stéphane Ventaja			13	11											14
24	(Spain) Alejandro Geppert													14	11	12
25	(Slovakia) Martin Ryba	19	12	14	Ret	Ret	Ret									10
26	(Germany) Patrick Sing							18	15	11	C					10
27	(Lithuania) Jonas Karklys									12	C					7
28	(Portugal) Luís Cidade	16	13													5
29	(Spain) Rubén Fernández					DNS	16	14	17			Ret	17	19	15	4
30	(France) Gilles Colombani			20	14											3
31	(Slovakia) Samuel Sládečka													20	14	3
32	(Italy) Giacomo Ghermandi	20	17	15	16	18	Ret	17	Ret	Ret	C	15	16	21	17	2
33	(Italy) Matteo Poloni											17	15			1
34	(Portugal) Gustavo Moura Jr	18	Ret													0
35	(Czech Republic) Václav Janík											20	19			0
36	(Italy) Paolo Rocca											19	21			0
37	(Hungary) Levente Losonczy											Ret	DNS			0
Pos.	Driver	POR (Portugal)		LEC (France)		SPA (Belgium)		NOR (Germany)		NÜR (Germany)		MNZ (Italy)		BAR (Spain)		Pts.

Colour	Result
Gold	Winner
Silver	Second place
Bronze	Third place
Green	Points classification
Blue	Non-points classification
Blue	Non-classified finish (NC)
Purple	Retired, not classified (Ret)
Red	Did not qualify (DNQ)
Red	Did not pre-qualify (DNPQ)
Black	Disqualified (DSQ)
White	Did not start (DNS)
White	Withdrew (WD)
White	Race cancelled (C)
Blank	Did not practice (DNP)
Blank	Did not arrive (DNA)
Blank	Excluded (EX)

**Bold** – Pole
Italics – Fastest Lap

† – Drivers did not finish the race, but were classified as they completed over 75% of the race distance.

==== Teams' standings ====
Pos.	Team	Pts.
1	(Belgium) Comtoyou Racing	797
2	(Italy) Target Competition	581
3	(Spain) Volcano Motorsport	579
4	(Germany) Halder Motorsport	522
5	(Czech Republic) Janík Motorsport	354
6	(France) Sébastien Loeb Racing	236
7	(Slovakia) Brutal Fish Racing Team	139
8	(Spain) RC2 Junior Team	118
9	(Italy) Aggressive Team Italia	83
10	(Slovenia) Lema Racing	33
11	(France) Team Clairet Sport	31
12	(Italy) CRM Motorsport	28
13	(Italy) Élite Motorsport	25
14	(Germany) RaceSing	19
15	(Spain) Teo Martín Motorsport	18
16	(Lithuania) Juta Racing	11
17	(Italy) BF Motorsport	8
18	(Italy) MM Motorsport	1

==== TCR BeNeLux Drivers' standings ====
Pos.	Driver	POR (Portugal)		LEC (France)		SPA (Belgium)		NOR (Germany)		NÜR (Germany)		MNZ (Italy)		BAR (Spain)		Points
Pos.	Driver	RD1	RD2	RD1	RD2	RD1	RD2	RD1	RD2	RD1	RD2	RD1	RD2	RD1	RD2	Points
1	(Argentina) Franco Girolami	3	1	2	2	**2**	3	**2**	1	3	C	5	1	2	1	449
2	(Italy) Nicola Baldan	**1**	6	5	5	4	7	5	5	2	C	1	2	**2**	5	376
3	(United Kingdom) Josh Files	4	4	4	6	3	4	1	2	5	C	**2**	4	7	6	359
4	(Netherlands) Tom Coronel	5	3	**1**	3	5	2			**1**	C	6	3	1	2	349
5	(Spain) Isidro Callejas	2	5	6	4	1	5	3	3	6	C	4	NC	1	4	346
6	(Spain) Pepe Oriola	6	2	3	1	Ret	6	Ret	6	4	C	3	5	3	Ret	252
7	(Slovakia) Maťo Homola	7	7	7	7	Ret	1	4	4	Ret	C					166
8	(Belgium) Frédéric Vervisch													3	3	60
Pos.	Driver	POR (Portugal)		LEC (France)		SPA (Belgium)		NOR (Germany)		NÜR (Germany)		MNZ (Italy)		BAR (Spain)		Pts.
