= Jack Young (racing driver) =

British racing driver (born 2001)

- Nationality: (United Kingdom) British
- Born: 11 October 2001 (age 25) Belfast, United Kingdom

Porsche Supercup career
- Debut season: 2026
- Current team: Target Competition
- Car number: 29
- Starts: 8
- Wins: 0
- Podiums: 0
- Poles: 0
- Fastest laps: 0
- Best finish: 14th in 2026

Championship titles
- 2019 2017: Renault UK Clio Cup; Renault UK Clio Cup Junior
Medal record
Touring car racing
Representing Ireland
FIA Motorsport Games
Bronze medal – third place	2022 Le Castellet	Touring Car Cup

Jack Young (born 11 October 2001) is a British racing driver from Northern Ireland set to compete in Porsche Supercup for Target Competition.

== Career ==
Young made his car racing debut in 2017, racing in the Renault UK Clio Cup Junior and winning the series title with one win and four other podiums to his name. The following year, Young raced in the last four rounds of the Renault UK Clio Cup, as well as winning the Renault Clio Cup International Finale towards the end of the year. Racing full-time in the Renault UK Clio Cup in 2019, Young won seven times and scored five further podiums as he secured the title at season's end. During 2019, Young also made a one-off appearance in TCR Europe for Vuković Motorsport. Continuing with Vuković Motorsport for the following year, Young raced with them in the first two rounds of the World Touring Car Cup before leaving the team and series ahead of the Slovakia Ring round.

Moving to TCR Europe full-time in 2021, Young joined Brutal Fish Racing Team, as well as joining the JAS Driver Development Programme. In his rookie year in the series, Young scored a best result of second at Zandvoort, as he also took third-place finishes at Nürburgring and Monza, which helped him end the year tenth in points. During 2021, Young also made a one-off appearance in TCR Italy at Misano for MM Motorsport. Young continued in the series for 2022, switching to Profi-Car Team Halder, as he was retained as a JAS Driver Development driver. Opening up the year with his maiden series win at Algarve, Young then had to wait six rounds for his second win of the season, coming in race one at Barcelona, en route to a sixth-place points finish. During 2022, Young also raced for MM Motorsport in a one-off appearance in TCR Italy at Monza, and also finished third in the FIA Motorsport Games Touring Car Cup while representing Ireland.

The following year, Young joined Dongfeng Honda MacPro Racing Team to compete in TCR China. In his only season in the series, Young scored wins in both Zhuzhou and the second Shanghai round, as well as taking two more podiums to secure runner-up honors in the standings. After Dongfeng Honda pulled out of the series during the off-season, Young was left on the sidelines for 2024, before returning to TCR competition in 2025 by joining M&K Racing to race in Super Taikyu. Competing in all but one race, Young won at Motegi, Autopolis and Fuji, as well as scoring two more podiums to help his team finish runner-up in the ST-TCR standings.

In 2026, Young moved to Target Competition to enter Porsche Supercup, in which he took a best result of fourth at the Hungaroring and Zandvoort to end the year 14th in points.

== Karting record ==
=== Karting career summary ===
Season	Series	Team	Position
2011	Super One Series – Honda Cadet		1st
2011	Kartmasters British GP — Comer Cadet		17th
2013	Trent Valley Kart Club – Mini Max		76th
2013	Kartmasters British GP — Mini Max		9th
2014	Super One Series — Mini Max		24th

== Racing record ==
=== Racing career summary ===
Season	Series	Team	Races	Wins	Poles	F/Laps	Podiums	Points	Position
2017	Renault UK Clio Cup Junior	MRM	8	1	3	3	5	165	**1st**
2017	Goodwood Revival – Kinrara Trophy		1	0	0	0	0	—N/a	7th
2018	Goodwood MM – Stirling Moss Trophy		1	0	0	0	0	—N/a	5th
2018	Le Mans Classic – Jaguar Challenge		1	0	0	0	0	—N/a	27th
2018	BARC Sports/Saloons Championship		2	0	0	0	0	0	NC
2018	Renault UK Clio Cup	MRM Racing	8	0	1	1	0	46	15th
2018	Renault Clio Cup International Finale	MRM Racing	1	1	1	0	1	—N/a	**1st**
2019	Renault UK Clio Cup	MRM Racing	18	7	4	5	12	362	**1st**
2019	TCR Europe Touring Car Series	Vuković Motorsport	2	0	0	0	0	54	22nd
2019	TCR Ibérico Touring Car Series	Vuković Motorsport	2	0	0	0	0	24	11th
2019	Goodwood MM – Gerry Marshall Trophy		2	0	0	0	0	—N/a	7th
2019	Goodwood Revival – Kinrara Trophy		1	0	0	0	0	—N/a	DNF
2020	World Touring Car Cup	Vuković Motorsport	3	0	0	0	0	0	24th
2020	Goodwood MM – Gerry Marshall Trophy		1	0	0	0	0	—N/a	7th
2020	Goodwood Revival – Stirling Moss Trophy		1	0	0	0	0	—N/a	14th
2021	TCR Europe Touring Car Series	Brutal Fish Racing Team	14	0	1	2	3	205	10th
2021	TCR Italy Touring Car Championship	MM Motorsport	2	0	0	1	1	37	NC
2021	Goodwood MM – Gerry Marshall Trophy		2	0	0	0	0	—N/a	7th
2022	TCR Europe Touring Car Series	Profi-Car Team Halder	13	2	1	1	2	246	6th
2022	TCR Italy Touring Car Championship	MM Motorsport	2	0	0	0	2	80	NC
2022	FIA Motorsport Games Touring Car Cup	Team Ireland	1	0	0	0	1	—N/a	**3rd**
2023	TCR China Touring Car Championship	Dongfeng Honda MacPro Racing Team	12	3	1	6	5	159	**2nd**
2024	Goodwood MM – Gerry Marshall Trophy		2	0	0	0	0	—N/a	7th
2025	Super Taikyu Series – ST-TCR	M&K Racing	5	3	5	0	5	117‡	**2nd‡**
2025	Goodwood MM – Gordon Spice Trophy		1	0	0	0	0	—N/a	13th
2026	Porsche Supercup	Target Competition	8	0	0	0	0	33.5	14th

^{‡} Team standings

=== Complete TCR Europe Touring Car Series results ===
(key) (Races in bold indicate pole position) (Races in italics indicate fastest lap)

Year	Team	Car	1	2	3	4	5	6	7	8	9	10	11	12	13	14	DC	Points
2019	Vuković Motorsport	Renault Mégane R.S TCR	HUN; 1	HUN; 2	HOC; 1	HOC; 2	SPA; 1	SPA; 2	RBR; 1	RBR; 2	OSC; 1	OSC; 2	CAT; 1; 4	CAT; 2; 4	MNZ; 1	MNZ; 2	22nd	54
2021	Brutal Fish Racing Team	Honda Civic Type R TCR (FK8)	SVK; 1; 11	SVK; 2; 11	LEC; 1; 5^{6}	LEC; 2 Ret	**ZAN**; **1**; 2^{1}	ZAN; 2; 9	SPA; 1; 18†	SPA; 2; 13	NÜR; 1; 17^{10}	NÜR; 2; 3	MNZ; 1 Ret^{2}	MNZ; 2; 3	CAT; 1; 8^{8}	CAT; 2; 12	10th	205
2022	Profi-Car Team Halder	Honda Civic Type R TCR (FK8)	ALG; 1; 1	ALG; 2; 11	LEC; 1; 19	LEC; 2; 13	SPA; 1; 8	SPA; 2; 6	NOR; 1; 10	NOR; 2; 6	NÜR; 1 Ret	NÜR; 2 C	MNZ; 1; 11	MNZ; 2; 7	**CAT**; **1**; 1	CAT; 2; 5	6th	246

^{†} Young did not finish, but was classified as he completed over 75% of the race distance.

=== Complete World Touring Car Cup results ===
(key) (Races in bold indicate pole position) (Races in italics indicate fastest lap)

Year	Team	Car	1	2	3	4	5	6	7	8	9	10	11	12	13	14	15	16	DC	Points
2020	Vuković Motorsport	Renault Mégane R.S TCR	BEL; 1; 20†	BEL; 2; 21†	GER; 1 Ret	GER; 2 DNS	SVK; 1	SVK; 2	SVK; 3	HUN; 1	HUN; 2	HUN; 3	ESP; 1	ESP; 2	ESP; 3	ARA; 1	ARA; 2	ARA; 3	24th	0

^{†} Young did not finish the race, but was classified as he completed over 90% of the race distance.

=== Complete TCR China Touring Car Championship results ===
(key) (Races in bold indicate pole position) (Races in italics indicate fastest lap)

Year	Team	Car	1	2	3	4	5	6	7	8	9	10	11	12	DC	Points
2023	Dongfeng Honda MacPro Racing Team	Honda Civic Type R TCR (FK8)	SHA1; 1; 2^{3}	SHA1; 2 Ret											2nd	159
2023	Dongfeng Honda MacPro Racing Team	Honda Civic Type R TCR (FL5)			ZHE; 1; 7^{1}	ZHE; 2; 2	ZHZ1; 1; 6^{3}	ZHZ1; 2; 1	SHA2; 1; 1^{2}	SHA2; 2; 9	**ZHZ2**; **1**; 1^{1}	ZHZ2; 2; 4	MAC; 1 Ret^{5}	MAC; 2 Ret	2nd	159

=== Complete Porsche Supercup results ===
(key) (Races in bold indicate pole position) (Races in italics indicate fastest lap)

Year	Team	1	2	3	4	5	6	7	8	Pos.	Points
2026	Target Competition	MON; 12	CAT; 21	RBR; Ret	SPA; 19	HUN; 4	ZND; Ret	ZND; 4	MNZ; 14‡	14th	33.5

^{‡} Half points awarded as less than 50% of race distance was completed.
