= 2022 eTouring Car World Cup =

ETouring Car Championship

The 2022 FIA ETCR – eTouring Car World Cup was the second and last season of the touring car series for electric cars known as Pure ETCR Championship in its inaugural season in 2021. The season began on 6 May 2022 at the Circuit de Pau-Ville and ended on 25 September 2022 at Sachsenring. Adrien Tambay succeeded teammate Mattias Ekström as the drivers' champion, while Cupra EKS repeated its manufacturers' title. In March 2023, the promoter announced that the series would not be continued.

== Teams and drivers ==
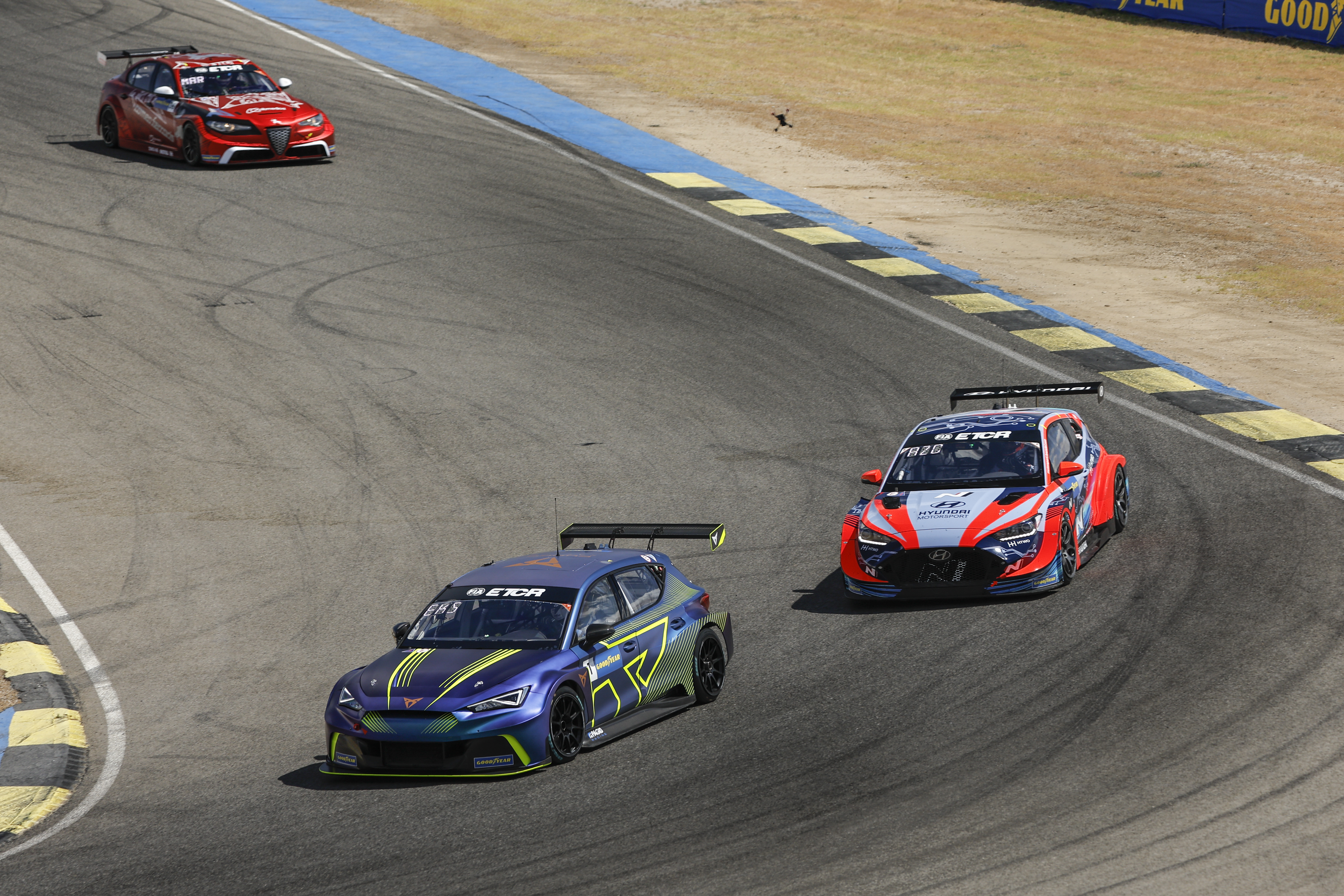
Round 3, Circuito del Jarama (19 Jun 2022); Cupra (#1, Mattias Ekström) leads into the turn, followed closely by Veloster (#96, Mikel Azcona), with Giulia (#36, Maxime Martin) trailing

Team	Car	No	Drivers	Rounds	Ref.
(Sweden) Cupra EKS	CUPRA León e-Racer	1	(Sweden) Mattias Ekström	All	
(Sweden) Cupra EKS	CUPRA León e-Racer	10	(United Kingdom) Tom Blomqvist	All	
(Sweden) Cupra EKS	CUPRA León e-Racer	27	(France) Adrien Tambay	All	
(Sweden) Cupra EKS	CUPRA León e-Racer	28	(Spain) Jordi Gené	All	
(South Korea) Hyundai Motorsport N	Hyundai Veloster N ETCR	5	(Hungary) Norbert Michelisz	All	
(South Korea) Hyundai Motorsport N	Hyundai Veloster N ETCR	31	(Italy) Kevin Ceccon	1–2	
(South Korea) Hyundai Motorsport N	Hyundai Veloster N ETCR	69	(France) Jean-Karl Vernay	All	
(South Korea) Hyundai Motorsport N	Hyundai Veloster N ETCR	88	(Netherlands) Nicky Catsburg	3–6	
(South Korea) Hyundai Motorsport N	Hyundai Veloster N ETCR	96	(Spain) Mikel Azcona	All	
(Italy) Romeo Ferraris	Alfa Romeo Giulia ETCR	7	(Canada) Bruno Spengler	All	
(Italy) Romeo Ferraris	Alfa Romeo Giulia ETCR	21	(Italy) Giovanni Venturini	All	
(Italy) Romeo Ferraris	Alfa Romeo Giulia ETCR	25	(Italy) Luca Filippi	All	
(Italy) Romeo Ferraris	Alfa Romeo Giulia ETCR	36	(Belgium) Maxime Martin	All	

== Calendar ==
The calendar for the second season featuring seven events across Europe and Asia was revealed in December 2021. On 17 May, it was announced that Istanbul round was postponed to November due to the organizational issues: On 29 June, it was announced that Inje round was cancelled due to the logistical challenges in Asia: On 16 August, it was announced that Sachsenring round replaced Istanbul round as the season finale.

Round	Circuit	Date
1	(France) Circuit de Pau-Ville	6–8 May
2	(Hungary) Hungaroring	10–12 June
3	(Spain) Circuito del Jarama	17–19 June
4	(Belgium) Circuit Zolder	8–10 July
5	(Italy) Vallelunga Circuit (Historic International Circuit)	22–24 July
6	(Germany) Sachsenring	23–25 September
Cancelled rounds
C	(Turkey) Istanbul Park (Intermediate Circuit)	20–22 May
C	(South Korea) Inje Speedium (North Circuit)	7–9 October

== Results and standings ==
=== Results ===
Round	Circuit/Location	Pool Fast Winner	Pool Furious Winner	Overall Winner	Winning Team	Winning Car
1	(France) Circuit de Pau-Ville	(France) Adrien Tambay	(Sweden) Mattias Ekström	(Sweden) Mattias Ekström	Cupra EKS	CUPRA e-Racer
2	(Hungary) Hungaroring	(Belgium) Maxime Martin	(France) Adrien Tambay	(France) Adrien Tambay	Cupra EKS	CUPRA e-Racer
3	(Spain) Circuito del Jarama	(France) Adrien Tambay	(Sweden) Mattias Ekström	(Sweden) Mattias Ekström	Cupra EKS	CUPRA e-Racer
4	(Belgium) Circuit Zolder	(France) Adrien Tambay	(Belgium) Maxime Martin	(Belgium) Maxime Martin	Romeo Ferraris	Alfa Romeo Giulia ETCR
5	(Italy) Vallelunga Circuit	(Spain) Mikel Azcona	(Sweden) Mattias Ekström	(Spain) Mikel Azcona	Hyundai Motorsport N	Hyundai Veloster N ETCR
6	(Germany) Sachsenring	(United Kingdom) Tom Blomqvist	(France) Adrien Tambay	(United Kingdom) Tom Blomqvist	Cupra EKS	CUPRA e-Racer

Scoring system

Position	1st	2nd	3rd	4th	5th	6th
Qualifying	15	12	9	6	3	
Quarter-final 1	20	15	10			
Quarter-final 2	15	10	5			
Semi-final 1	20	15	10			
Semi-final 2	15	10	5			
Superfinal	40	30	20	15	10	5

=== Drivers' championship ===
Pos.	Driver	FRA (France)	HUN (Hungary)	ESP (Spain)	BEL (Belgium)	ITA (Italy)	GER (Germany)	Points
1	(France) Adrien Tambay	2	1	2	2	4	2	535
2	(Sweden) Mattias Ekström	1	2	1	5	2	4	488
3	(United Kingdom) Tom Blomqvist	3	6	9	3	3	1	434
4	(Belgium) Maxime Martin	6	3	4	1	5	5	421
5	(Spain) Mikel Azcona	4	4	5	4	1	8	408
6	(Canada) Bruno Spengler	5	4	7	8	9	9	306
7	(Hungary) Norbert Michelisz	8	11	6	11	8	3	293
8	(France) Jean-Karl Vernay	7	9	11	6	7	11	254
9	(Spain) Jordi Gené	9	12	3	12	11	12	218
10	(Italy) Giovanni Venturini	11	7	10	9	12	6	209
11	(Netherlands) Nicky Catsburg			8	7	6	10	188
12	(Italy) Luca Filippi	12	10	12	10	10	7	181
13	(Italy) Kevin Ceccon	10	8					67

=== Manufacturers' championship ===
Pos.	Manufacturer	Points
1	(Sweden) Cupra EKS	1076
2	(South Korea) Hyundai Motorsport N	746
3	(Italy) Romeo Ferraris	732
