= 2020 Campeonato de España de Resistencia =

Car racing season

The 2020 Campeonato de España de Resistencia is the eighth season of the Campeonato de España de Resistencia. It is the fifth season with the TCR class

== Teams and drivers ==
=== GT ===
Team	Car	No.	Drivers	Rounds
C1
(Spain) PCR Sport	Ferrari 458 Italia GT3	103	(Spain) Francesc Gutiérrez	All
(Spain) PCR Sport	Ferrari 458 Italia GT3	103	(Spain) Josep Mayola	All
(Spain) Monlau Competición	Renault R.S. 01 GT3	114	(Belgium) Jurgen Smet	1, 3
(United Arab Emirates) GPX Racing	Renault R.S. 01 GT3	116	(Denmark) Benjamin Goethe	1
(United Arab Emirates) GPX Racing	Renault R.S. 01 GT3	116	(Germany) Roald Goethe	1
(France) Vortex V8	Vortex V8	135	(France) Philippe Bonnel	4
(France) Vortex V8	Vortex V8	135	(France) Nicolas Nobs	4
(France) Vortex V8	Vortex V8	136	(France) Arnaud Gomez	All
(France) Vortex V8	Vortex V8	136	(France) Philippe Gruau	All
C2
(Spain) Baporo Motorsport	Porsche 991 GT3 Cup	105	(Andorra) Joan Vinyes	All
(Spain) Baporo Motorsport	Porsche 991 GT3 Cup	105	(Spain) Jaume Font	1, 3−5
(Spain) E2P Escuela Española de Pilotos	Porsche 991 GT3 Cup	108	(Spain) Antonio Sainero	All
(Spain) E2P Escuela Española de Pilotos	Porsche 991 GT3 Cup	108	(Spain) Javier Morcillo	1, 3−5
(Spain) E2P Escuela Española de Pilotos	Porsche 991 GT3 Cup	108	(Spain) Ismael Arquero	2
(Spain) E2P Escuela Española de Pilotos	Porsche 991 GT3 Cup	140	(Spain) Manuel Cintrano	4
(Spain) E2P Escuela Española de Pilotos	Porsche 991 GT3 Cup	140	(Portugal) Pedro Salvador	4
(Spain) CYL Karting Team	Ferrari 488 Challenge Evo	163	(Spain) Jose Manuel De Los Milagros	5
(Spain) CYL Karting Team	Ferrari 488 Challenge Evo	163	(Spain) Sergio Paulet	5
(Spain) R. A. C. Guadalope	Porsche 991 GT3 Cup	178	(Spain) Luis Lopez Anós	2−3, 5
(Spain) R. A. C. Guadalope	Porsche 991 GT3 Cup	178	(Spain) Álvaro Rodríguez	2−3, 5
(Spain) SMC Junior Motorsport	Porsche 991 GT3 Cup	190	(Spain) Fernando Navarrete Rodrigo	2−3
(Spain) SMC Junior Motorsport	Porsche 991 GT3 Cup	190	(Spain) Alvaro Lobera	2
(Spain) SMC Junior Motorsport	Porsche 991 GT3 Cup	190	(Spain) Fernando Navarrete Percides	3
C3
(Spain) Baporo Motorsport	Audi R8 LMS GT4	110	(Andorra) Manel Cerqueda Jr.	1
(Spain) Baporo Motorsport	Audi R8 LMS GT4	110	(Spain) Daniel Diaz-Varela	1
(Spain) Club Deportivo	Ginetta G55 GT4	111	(Spain) Daniel Carretero	1−2
(Spain) Club Deportivo	Ginetta G55 GT4	111	(Spain) Pablo Yeregui	1−2
(Spain) CD Plemar Sport	Ginetta G50 GT4	120	(Spain) Alvaro Huerta	1
(Spain) CD Plemar Sport	Ginetta G50 GT4	120	(Spain) Salvador Tineo Arroyo	1
(Spain) NM Racing Team	Mercedes-AMG GT4	126	(Spain) Jesús Alberto de Martín	All
(Spain) NM Racing Team	Mercedes-AMG GT4	126	(Spain) Rafael Villanueva	All
(Spain) NM Racing Team	Ginetta G55 GT4	150	(Spain) Belén García	5
(Spain) NM Racing Team	Ginetta G55 GT4	150	(Spain) Jose Luis García Molina	5
(France) Vortex V8	Vortex Light	134	(Switzerland) Karen Gaillard	1
(France) Vortex V8	Vortex Light	134	(France) Patrick Brochier	2−3, 5
(France) Vortex V8	Vortex Light	134	(France) Gilles Courtois	2−3, 5
(France) Vortex V8	Vortex Light	135	(France) Philippe Bonnel	1
(France) Vortex V8	Vortex Light	135	(France) Nicolas Nobs	1
(France) Vortex V8	Vortex Light	135	(France) Lionel Amrouche	2
(France) Pierre Arraou	Audi R8 LMS GT4	164	(France) Pierre Arraou	1

=== CER ===
Team	Car	No.	Drivers	Rounds
TCR
(Spain) PCR Sport	Cupra León Competición TCR	5	(Spain) Jaime Carbó	3, 5
(Spain) PCR Sport	Cupra León Competición TCR	5	(Spain) Jose Manuel De Los Milagros	3, 5
(Spain) PCR Sport	CUPRA León TCR	26	(Spain) Vicente Dasi	All
(Spain) PCR Sport	CUPRA León TCR	26	(Spain) Josep Parera	All
(Spain) PCR Sport	CUPRA León TCR	31	(Spain) Guillermo Aso	All
(Spain) PCR Sport	CUPRA León TCR	40	(Spain) Antonio Aristi	5
(Spain) PCR Sport	CUPRA León TCR	40	(Spain) Harriet Arruabarrena	5
(Spain) RC2 Junior Team	Cupra León Competición TCR	7	(Spain) Rubén Fernandez	5
(Spain) RC2 Junior Team	Cupra León Competición TCR	7	(Spain) Felipe Fernandez	5
(Spain) RC2 Junior Team	CUPRA León TCR	17	(Spain) Raul Martínez	1
(Spain) RC2 Junior Team	CUPRA León TCR	17	(Spain) Ruben Martinez	1
(Spain) RC2 Junior Team	CUPRA León TCR	77	(Spain) Ferran Mendez	All
(Spain) RC2 Junior Team	CUPRA León TCR	77	(Spain) Jordi Gené	4
(Spain) RC2 Junior Team	CUPRA León TCR DSG	20	(Spain) Rubén Fernandez	1−4
(Spain) RC2 Junior Team	CUPRA León TCR DSG	20	(Spain) Felipe Fernandez	1−3
(Spain) RC2 Junior Team	CUPRA León TCR DSG	20	(Spain) Victor Fernandez	4−5
(Spain) RC2 Junior Team	CUPRA León TCR DSG	23	(Spain) Pedro Peña	All
(Spain) RC2 Junior Team	CUPRA León TCR DSG	23	(Spain) Didac Ros	1−2, 5
(Spain) RC2 Junior Team	CUPRA León TCR DSG	23	(Spain) David Cebrián Ariza	3
(Spain) RC2 Junior Team	CUPRA León TCR DSG	23	(Spain) Felipe Fernandez	4
(Spain) Baporo Motorsport	CUPRA León TCR	13	(Andorra) Amilia Vinyes	4−5
(Spain) Volcano Motorsport	CUPRA León TCR	16	(Russia) Evgeni Leonov	All
(Spain) Volcano Motorsport	CUPRA León TCR	16	(Spain) Mikel Azcona	1−3, 5
(France) Motorsport Developpement	Audi RS 3 LMS TCR	34	(France) Jean Laurent Navarro	4
(France) Motorsport Developpement	Audi RS 3 LMS TCR	34	(France) Pierre Arnaud Navarro	4
(France) Motorsport Developpement	Audi RS 3 LMS TCR	34	(Belgium) Roberto Nale	5
(France) Motorsport Developpement	Audi RS 3 LMS TCR	34	(Belgium) Giovanni Scamardi	5
(France) Motorsport Developpement	Audi RS 3 LMS TCR	35	(France) Pierre Arnaud Navarro	4
(Spain) SPV Racing	Audi RS 3 LMS TCR	44	(Spain) Alvaro Fontes	1−3
(Spain) SPV Racing	Audi RS 3 LMS TCR	44	(Germany) Philipp Smaali	1−3
(Spain) SPV Racing	Audi RS 3 LMS TCR	55	(Netherlands) Mirco van Nostrum	All
(Spain) SPV Racing	Audi RS 3 LMS TCR	55	(United Kingdom) Branden Lee Oxley	All
(Spain) Escuderia Motor Terassa	CUPRA León TCR	50	(Spain) Jorge Belloc Diaz	4
(Spain) Escuderia Motor Terassa	CUPRA León TCR	50	(Spain) Isidoro Diaz-Guerra	4
(Spain) Julio Carayol	CUPRA León TCR	69	(Spain) Julio Carayol	1
(Spain) Terra Training Motor	Peugeot 308 TCR	81	(Spain) Alvaro Lobera	3
(Spain) Terra Training Motor	Peugeot 308 TCR	81	(Spain) José Maria González	3
(Spain) Escuderia Local Sport	CUPRA León TCR	88	(Spain) Luis Barrios	3
(Spain) Escuderia Local Sport	CUPRA León TCR	88	(Spain) Javier Sánchez Macías	3
D2
(France) Chefo Sport	Peugeot 308 Racing Cup	9	(France) Laurent Puigtmal	1
(France) Chefo Sport	Peugeot 308 Racing Cup	10	(Spain) Nico Abella	1−4
(France) Chefo Sport	Peugeot 308 Racing Cup	10	(Spain) Isidro Callejas	1−4
(France) Chefo Sport	Peugeot 308 Racing Cup	21	(Spain) Gabriel Alonso	All
(France) Chefo Sport	Peugeot 308 Racing Cup	21	(Spain) Mariano Alonso	1−2, 4−5
(France) Chefo Sport	Peugeot 308 Racing Cup	21	(Spain) Igor Urien	3
(France) Frédéric Billon	Peugeot 308 Racing Cup	22	(France) Frédéric Billon	1
(France) Frédéric Billon	Peugeot 308 Racing Cup	22	(France) Thierry Malassagne	1
(Spain) CD Plemar Sport	Peugeot 308 Racing Cup	28	(Spain) Juan De Dios Gomez	1, 3
(France) Milan Compétition	Peugeot 308 Racing Cup	30	(France) Denis Gibaud	1
(Spain) SMC Junior Motorsport	Peugeot 308 Racing Cup	32	(Spain) Antonio Cutillas	All
(Spain) SMC Junior Motorsport	Peugeot 308 Racing Cup	32	(Spain) Álvaro Vela	All
(Spain) Motor Club Sabadell	Peugeot 308 Racing Cup	40	(Spain) Luis Gonzalez	2
D3
(Spain) Ultima Vuelta	Peugeot RCZ Cup	8	(Spain) Adrian Garcia	All
(Spain) Ultima Vuelta	Peugeot RCZ Cup	8	(Spain) Ivan Velasco	All
D4
(France) Henry Pellefigue	Renault Sport Spider	4	(France) Edouard Atkatlian	5
(France) Henry Pellefigue	Renault Sport Spider	4	(France) Henry Pellefigue	5
(Spain) Skualo Competicion	Renault Clio Cup	14	(Netherlands) Henk van Zoest	1, 5
(Spain) Motor Club Sabadell	Renault Clio Cup	19	(Spain) Clemente Cejudo	All
(Spain) Motor Club Sabadell	Renault Clio Cup	19	(Spain) Marc Cejudo	All
(Spain) Motor Club Sabadell	Renault Clio Cup	67	(France) Jeremie Lesoudier	1, 3−5
(Spain) Motor Club Sabadell	Renault Clio Cup	67	(France) Ludovic Lesoudier	1, 3−4
(Spain) RC2 Junior Team	Renault Clio Cup	24	(Spain) Victor Fernandez	1−3
(Spain) UCAV Racing	Peugeot 308 GTI	33	(Spain) Felix Aparicio	5
(Spain) Automovil Club Zaragoza	Renault Clio Cup	514	(Spain) José Joaquin Rodrigo	5
(Spain) Automovil Club Zaragoza	Renault Clio Cup	514	(Spain) Jorge Vecino	5
D5
(Spain) Peña Autocross Arteixo	Renault Clio	12	(Spain) Juan Campos Toimil	1−3
(Spain) Vicente Valles	Ford Fiesta	35	(Spain) Vicente Valles	1−2
(Spain) CD Plemar Sport	Alfa Romeo 147 GTA Cup	86	(Spain) Alba Camacho	3
(Spain) CD Plemar Sport	Alfa Romeo 147 GTA Cup	86	(Spain) Juan Campos Holanda	3
(Spain) Arakil Motorsport	Toyota Auris Cup	87	(Spain) Pedro Herraiz	3
(Spain) Arakil Motorsport	Toyota Auris Cup	87	(Spain) Javier Jiménez	3
D6
(Spain) Arakil Motorsport	Ford Fiesta	36	(Spain) Sergio Torres	1
(Spain) Arakil Motorsport	Ford Fiesta	36	(Spain) Oscar Vergara	1
(Spain) Arakil Motorsport	Ford Fiesta	36	(Spain) Erik Zabala	5
(Spain) Arakil Motorsport	Ford Fiesta	37	(Spain) Erik Zabala	1−2

== Calendar and results ==
Bold indicates overall winner for each car class (GT and CER).

=== GT ===
Rnd.	Circuit	Date	C1 Winners	C2 Winners	C3 Winners	Supporting
1	(Navarre) Circuito de Navarra, Los Arcos	18–19 July	**(Spain) Francesc Gutiérrez** **(Spain) Josep Mayola**	(Spain) Javier Morcillo (Spain) Antonio Sainero	(Andorra) Manel Cerqueda Jr. (Spain) Daniel Diaz-Varela	F4 Spanish Championship
1	(Navarre) Circuito de Navarra, Los Arcos	18–19 July	**(Belgium) Jurgen Smet**	(Spain) Jaume Font (Andorra) Joan Vinyes	(Spain) Jesús Alberto de Martín (Spain) Rafael Villanueva	F4 Spanish Championship
2	(Valencian Community) Circuit Ricardo Tormo, Cheste	29 August	**(Spain) Francesc Gutiérrez** **(Spain) Josep Mayola**	(Andorra) Joan Vinyes	(France) Lionel Amrouche	
2	(Valencian Community) Circuit Ricardo Tormo, Cheste	29 August	**(Spain) Francesc Gutiérrez** **(Spain) Josep Mayola**	(Spain) Fernando Navarrete (Spain) Alvaro Lobera	(France) Lionel Amrouche	
3	(Andalusia) Circuito de Jerez, Jerez	19–20 September	**(Belgium) Jurgen Smet**	(Spain) Jaume Font (Andorra) Joan Vinyes	(Spain) Jesús Alberto de Martín (Spain) Rafael Villanueva	F4 Spanish Championship
3	(Andalusia) Circuito de Jerez, Jerez	19–20 September	**(Spain) Francesc Gutiérrez** **(Spain) Josep Mayola**	(Spain) Jaume Font (Andorra) Joan Vinyes	(Spain) Jesús Alberto de Martín (Spain) Rafael Villanueva	F4 Spanish Championship
4	(Catalonia) Circuit de Barcelona-Catalunya, Montmeló	14–15 November	**(Spain) Francesc Gutiérrez** **(Spain) Josep Mayola**	(Spain) Javier Morcillo (Spain) Antonio Sainero	(Spain) Jesús Alberto de Martín (Spain) Rafael Villanueva	F4 Spanish Championship
5	(Aragon) Ciudad del Motor de Aragón, Alcañiz	28–29 November	(Spain) Francesc Gutiérrez (Spain) Josep Mayola	**(Spain) Jose Manuel De Los Milagros** **(Spain) Sergio Paulet**	(Spain) Jesús Alberto de Martín (Spain) Rafael Villanueva	
5	(Aragon) Ciudad del Motor de Aragón, Alcañiz	28–29 November	(Spain) Francesc Gutiérrez (Spain) Josep Mayola	**(Spain) Jose Manuel De Los Milagros** **(Spain) Sergio Paulet**	(Spain) Jesús Alberto de Martín (Spain) Rafael Villanueva	

=== CER ===
Rnd.	Circuit	Date	TCR Winners	D2 Winners	D3 Winners	D4 Winners	D5 Winners	D6 Winners	Supporting
1	(Navarre) Circuito de Navarra, Los Arcos	18–19 July	**(Spain) Mikel Azcona** **(Russia) Evgeni Leonov**	(Spain) Antonio Cutillas (Spain) Álvaro Vela	(Spain) Adrian Garcia (Spain) Ivan Velasco	(France) Jeremie Lesoudier (France) Ludovic Lesoudier	(Spain) Vicente Valles	(Spain) Erik Zabala	F4 Spanish Championship
1	(Navarre) Circuito de Navarra, Los Arcos	18–19 July	**(Spain) Mikel Azcona** **(Russia) Evgeni Leonov**	(Spain) Antonio Cutillas (Spain) Álvaro Vela	(Spain) Adrian Garcia (Spain) Ivan Velasco	(France) Jeremie Lesoudier (France) Ludovic Lesoudier	(Spain) Vicente Valles	(Spain) Erik Zabala	F4 Spanish Championship
2	(Valencian Community) Circuit Ricardo Tormo, Cheste	29 August	**(Spain) Ferran Mendez**	(Spain) Luis Gonzalez	(Spain) Adrian Garcia (Spain) Ivan Velasco	(Spain) Clemente Cejudo (Spain) Marc Cejudo	(Spain) Vicente Valles	(Spain) Erik Zabala	
2	(Valencian Community) Circuit Ricardo Tormo, Cheste	29 August	**(Spain) Mikel Azcona** **(Russia) Evgeni Leonov**	(Spain) Luis Gonzalez	(Spain) Adrian Garcia (Spain) Ivan Velasco	(France) Edouard Atkatlian (France) Henry Pellefigue	(Spain) Juan Campos Toimil	(Spain) Erik Zabala	
3	(Andalusia) Circuito de Jerez, Jerez	19–20 September	**(Spain) Ferran Mendez**	(Spain) Nico Abella (Spain) Isidro Callejas	(Spain) Adrian Garcia (Spain) Ivan Velasco	(Spain) Victor Fernandez	(Spain) Juan Campos Toimil	No entries	F4 Spanish Championship
3	(Andalusia) Circuito de Jerez, Jerez	19–20 September	**(Spain) Mikel Azcona** **(Russia) Evgeni Leonov**	(Spain) Nico Abella (Spain) Isidro Callejas	(Spain) Adrian Garcia (Spain) Ivan Velasco	(France) Jeremie Lesoudier (France) Ludovic Lesoudier	(Spain) Juan Campos Toimil	No entries	F4 Spanish Championship
4	(Catalonia) Circuit de Barcelona-Catalunya, Montmeló	14–15 November	**(Russia) Evgeni Leonov**	(Spain) Antonio Cutillas (Spain) Álvaro Vela	(Spain) Adrian Garcia (Spain) Ivan Velasco	(France) Jeremie Lesoudier (France) Ludovic Lesoudier	No entries	No entries	F4 Spanish Championship
5	(Aragon) Ciudad del Motor de Aragón, Alcañiz	28–29 November	**(Spain) Felipe Fernandez** **(Spain) Rubén Fernandez**	(Spain) Antonio Cutillas (Spain) Álvaro Vela	(Spain) Adrian Garcia (Spain) Ivan Velasco	(France) Jeremie Lesoudier	No entries	No finishers	
5	(Aragon) Ciudad del Motor de Aragón, Alcañiz	28–29 November	**(Spain) Mikel Azcona** **(Russia) Evgeni Leonov**	(Spain) Antonio Cutillas (Spain) Álvaro Vela	(Spain) Adrian Garcia (Spain) Ivan Velasco	(Spain) Clemente Cejudo (Spain) Marc Cejudo	No entries	(Spain) Erik Zabala	

== Championship standings ==
=== Scoring system ===
Position	1st	2nd	3rd	4th	5th	6th	7th	8th	9th	10th	11th	12th	13th	14th	15th	16th	17th	18th	19th	20th
Endurance races	52	48	44	36	32	28	24	20	18	16	14	12	10	8	6	5	4	3	2	1
Sprint races	40	36	32	24	20	16	14	10	8	6	5	4	3	2	1					

=== Drivers' championship ===
==== GT ====
Pos.	Driver	NAV (Navarre)		VAL (Valencian Community)		JER (Andalusia)		BAR (Catalonia)	ARA (Aragon)		Pts.
1	(Spain) Francesc Gutiérrez (Spain) Josep Mayola	1	Ret	1	1	2	1	1	4	2	320
2	(Andorra) Joan Vinyes	Ret	2	2	3	3	3	21	3	4	256
3	(Spain) Antonio Sainero	3	4	5	Ret	4	4	2	2	5	236
4	(Spain) Javier Morcillo	3	4			4	4	2	2	5	216
5	(France) Arnaud Gomez (France) Philippe Gruau	21	3	3	4	5	Ret	3	29	3	207
6	(Spain) Jaume Font	Ret	2			3	3	21	3	4	188
7	(Spain) Jesús Alberto de Martín (Spain) Rafael Villanueva	5	5	DNS	7	15	7	5	7	9	148
8	(Belgium) Jurgen Smet	DSQ	1			1	2				116
9	(Spain) Luis Lopez Anós (Spain) Álvaro Rodríguez			7	6	8	15		5	8	104
10	(France) Patrick Brochier (France) Gilles Courtois			14	15	18	17	20	20	26	98
11	(Spain) Fernando Navarrete Rodrigo			4	2	11	5				94
12	(Spain) Alvaro Lobera			4	2						60
13	(France) Philippe Bonnel (France) Nicolas Nobs	19	9					6			50
14	(Spain) Daniel Carretero (Spain) Pablo Yeregui	10	18	9	11						40
15	(Denmark) Benjamin Goethe (Germany) Roald Goethe	2	Ret								36
15	(France) Lionel Amrouche			6	5						36
15	(Spain) Manuel Cintrano (Portugal) Pedro Salvador							4			36
16	(Spain) Fernando Navarrete Percides					11	5				34
17	(Andorra) Manel Cerqueda Jr. (Spain) Daniel Diaz-Varela	4	20								29
18	(Switzerland) Karen Gaillard	7	14								26
19	(Spain) Alvaro Huerta (Spain) Salvador Tineo Arroyo	14	12								22
20	(Spain) Ismael Arquero			5	Ret						20
21	(France) Pierre Arraou	13	17								18
Drivers ineligible to score points
	(Spain) Jose Manuel De Los Milagros (Spain) Sergio Paulet								1	1	0
	(Spain) Belén García (Spain) Jose Luis García Molina								6	10	0
Pos.	Driver	NAV (Navarre)		VAL (Valencian Community)		JER (Andalusia)		BAR (Catalonia)	ARA (Aragon)		Pts.

Colour	Result
Gold	Winner
Silver	Second place
Bronze	Third place
Green	Points classification
Blue	Non-points classification
Blue	Non-classified finish (NC)
Purple	Retired, not classified (Ret)
Red	Did not qualify (DNQ)
Red	Did not pre-qualify (DNPQ)
Black	Disqualified (DSQ)
White	Did not start (DNS)
White	Withdrew (WD)
White	Race cancelled (C)
Blank	Did not practice (DNP)
Blank	Did not arrive (DNA)
Blank	Excluded (EX)

**Bold** – Pole
Italics – Fastest Lap

==== CER ====
===== TCR =====
Pos.	Driver	NAV (Navarre)		VAL (Valencian Community)		JER (Andalusia)		BAR (Catalonia)	ARA (Aragon)		Pts.
1	(Russia) Evgeni Leonov	6	6	10	8	7	6	7	9	6	324
2	(Spain) Mikel Azcona	6	6	10	8	7	6		9	6	296
3	(Spain) Ferran Mendez	9	19	8	Ret	6	8	8	12	7	260
4	(Spain) Guillermo Aso	8	7	13	14	9	12	12	10	11	240
5	(Spain) Felipe Fernandez	16	15	11	10	14	13	10	8	12	206
5	(Spain) Pedro Peña	15	10	Ret	9	10	9	10	11	24	206
6	(Spain) Rubén Fernandez	16	15	11	10	14	13	13	8	12	198
7	(Netherlands) Mirco van Nostrum (United Kingdom) Branden Lee Oxley	11	11	12	13	13	11	10	Ret	13	164
8	(Spain) Didac Ros	15	10	Ret	9				11	24	114
9	(Spain) Alvaro Fontes (Germany) Philipp Smaali	12	8	15	12	12	Ret				112
10	(Spain) Vicente Dasi (Spain) Josep Parera	18	16	16	16	16	16	15	17	17	100
11	(France) Pierre Arnaud Navarro							9	14	14	76
12	(Spain) David Cebrián Ariza					10	9				56
13	(Spain) Victor Fernandez							13	16	18	50
14	(Spain) Jordi Gené							8			48
15	(Belgium) Giovanni Scamardi								14	14	32
16	(Spain) Jaime Carbó (Spain) Jose Manuel De Los Milagros					19	DNS		18	15	28
17	(Spain) Raul Martínez	17	13								26
18	(Spain) Alvaro Lobera (Spain) José Maria González					Ret	10				24
19	(Spain) Luis Barrios (Spain) Javier Sánchez Macías					17	14				18
20	(Spain) Julio Carayol	20	Ret								16
	(France) Jean Laurent Navarro							9			0
	(Spain) Jorge Belloc Diaz (Spain) Isidoro Diaz-Guerra							Ret			0
Drivers ineligible to score points
	(Spain) Antonio Aristi (Spain) Harriet Arruabarrena								13	16	0
Pos.	Driver	NAV (Navarre)		VAL (Valencian Community)		JER (Andalusia)		BAR (Catalonia)	ARA (Aragon)		Pts.

Colour	Result
Gold	Winner
Silver	Second place
Bronze	Third place
Green	Points classification
Blue	Non-points classification
Blue	Non-classified finish (NC)
Purple	Retired, not classified (Ret)
Red	Did not qualify (DNQ)
Red	Did not pre-qualify (DNPQ)
Black	Disqualified (DSQ)
White	Did not start (DNS)
White	Withdrew (WD)
White	Race cancelled (C)
Blank	Did not practice (DNP)
Blank	Did not arrive (DNA)
Blank	Excluded (EX)

**Bold** – Pole
Italics – Fastest Lap
