= 2022 FIA Motorsport Games Touring Car Cup =

Motorsport event

Race details
Date	26–30 October
Official name	FIA Motorsport Games Touring Car Cup
Location	Circuit Paul Ricard, France
Course	Permanent circuit 5.842 km (3.630 mi)
Distance	Qualifying; Two 30 minutes Race 1; 25 minutes +1 lap Race 2; 30 minutes +1 lap
- Qualifying Race

Pole
Driver	(Belgium) Gilles Magnus	Team Belgium
Time	2:11.831

Fastest lap
Driver	(Belgium) Gilles Magnus	Team Belgium
Time	2:13.334

Podium
First	(Belgium) Gilles Magnus	Team Belgium
Second	(Netherlands) Tom Coronel	Team Netherlands
Third	(Republic of Ireland) Jack Young	Team Ireland
- Main Race

Pole
Driver	(Belgium) Gilles Magnus	Team Belgium

Fastest lap
Driver	(Netherlands) Tom Coronel	Team Netherlands
Time	2:14.196

Medalists
1st place, gold medalist(s)	(Netherlands) Tom Coronel	Team Netherlands
2nd place, silver medalist(s)	(Spain) Isidro Callejas	Team Spain
3rd place, bronze medalist(s)	(Republic of Ireland) Jack Young	Team Ireland

The 2022 FIA Motorsport Games Touring Car Cup was the second FIA Motorsport Games Touring Car Cup, held at Circuit Paul Ricard, France on 26 October to 30 October 2022. The race was contested with TCR Touring Car spec cars. The event was part of the 2022 FIA Motorsport Games.

== Entry list ==
Team	Entrant	Car	No.	Driver
Team Switzerland	(Spain) Volcano Motorsport	Cupra León Competición TCR	2	Gabriel Lusquiños
Team Hong Kong	(Hong Kong) KCMG	Honda Civic Type R TCR (FK8)	3	Andy Yan
Team Belgium	(Belgium) Comtoyou Racing	Audi RS 3 LMS TCR (2021)	16	Gilles Magnus
Team Canada	(Belgium) Comtoyou Racing	Audi RS 3 LMS TCR (2021)	17	Travis Hill
Team Australia	(Australia) Garry Rogers Motorsport	Peugeot 308 TCR	18	Aaron Cameron
Team Sweden	(Belgium) Comtoyou Racing	Audi RS 3 LMS TCR (2021)	19	Andreas Bäckman
Team France	(France) Team Clairet Sport	Peugeot 308 TCR	20	Teddy Clairet
Team Latvia	Team Latvia	Audi RS 3 LMS TCR (2021)	21	Valters Zviedris
Team United Kingdom	(United Kingdom) Restart Racing	Honda Civic Type R TCR (FK8)	22	Chris Smiley
Team Norway	(Norway) Esbjug Motorsport & Engineering	Honda Civic Type R TCR (FK8)	23	Didrik Esbjug
Team Spain	Motorsport Team Spain	Cupra León Competición TCR	26	Isidro Callejas
Team Argentina	(Estonia) ALM Motorsport	Honda Civic Type R TCR (FK8)	29	Ignacio Montenegro
Team Ukraine	(Slovakia) Aditis Racing	Audi RS 3 LMS TCR (2017)	30	Pavlo Chabanov
Team Italy	(Slovenia) Scuderia Ghermandi by Lema Racing	Cupra León Competición TCR	33	Giacomo Ghermandi
(Republic of Ireland) Team Ireland	(Estonia) ALM Motorsport	Honda Civic Type R TCR (FK8)	62	Jack Young
Team Brazil	(Spain) Volcano Motorsport	Cupra León Competición TCR	77	Raphael Reis
Team Venezuela	(Spain) RC2 Junior Team	Audi RS 3 LMS TCR (2021)	101	Sergio López Bolotin
Team Netherlands	(Belgium) Comtoyou Racing Team DHL	Audi RS 3 LMS TCR (2021)	133	Tom Coronel
