= Sami Taoufik =

Moroccan racing driver (born 2002)

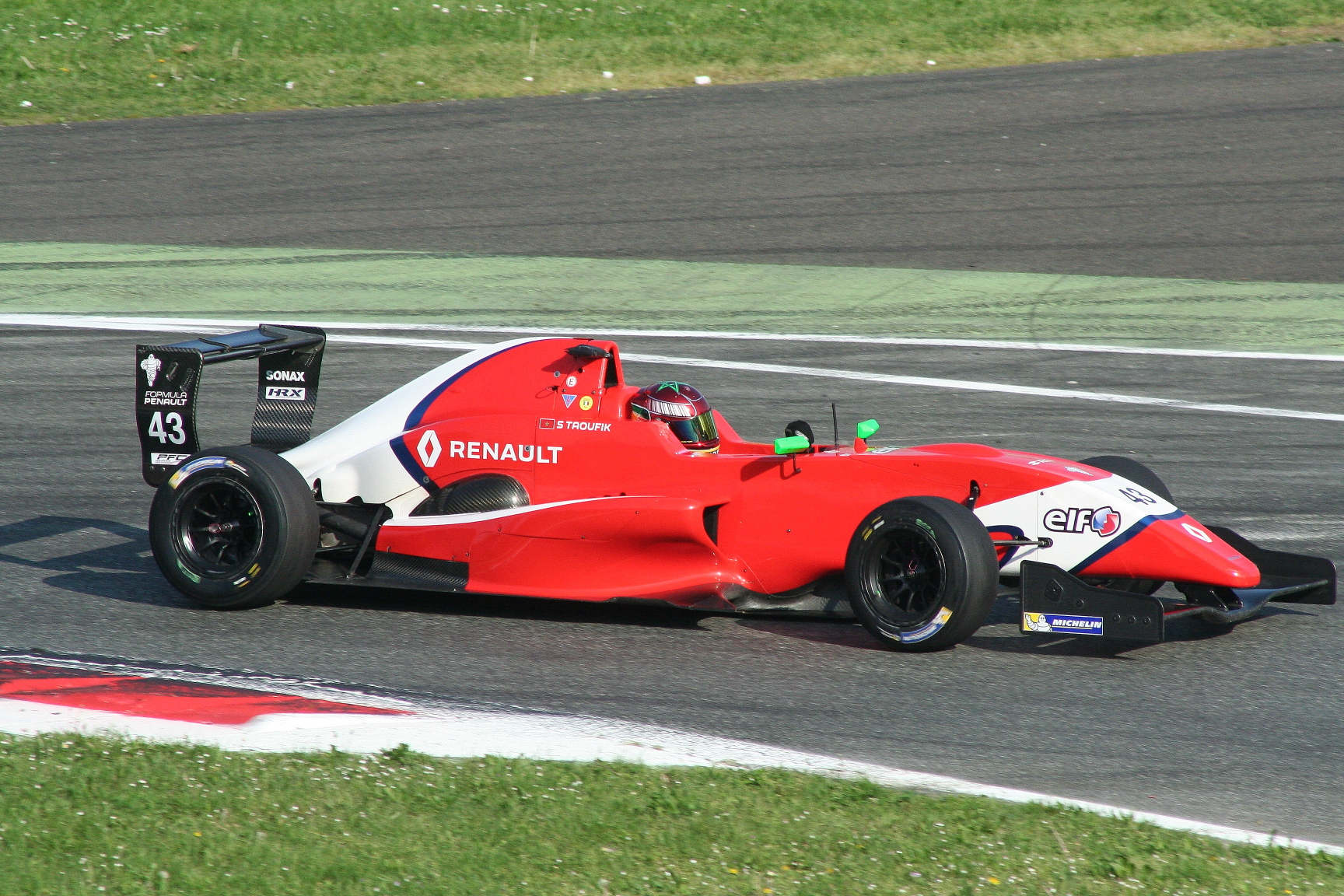
- Nationality: (Morocco) Moroccan
- Born: Sami Worship Taoufik; 27 February 2002 (age 24) Barcelona, Spain

TCR Europe Touring Car Series career
- Debut season: 2019
- Current team: Sébastien Loeb Racing
- Car number: 25
- Former teams: Comtoyou Racing
- Starts: 28
- Wins: 0
- Poles: 0
- Fastest laps: 3
- Best finish: 9th in 2021

Previous series
- 2018 2018: Formula Renault Eurocup; Formula 4 UAE Championship

Awards
- 2017: CIK-FIA Rookie of the Year

Sami Worship Taoufik (born 27 February 2002) is a Spanish-born Moroccan racing driver. He last competed in the TCR World Tour.

== Career ==
=== Early career ===
Born in Barcelona and based in Spain, Taoufik began karting in 2007, at age of five, and claimed four Spanish Championship titles.

Taoufik competed for two seasons in the OK Junior category between 2015 and 2016, year in which he won the WSK Super Master Series OKJ with the British team Ricky Flynn Motorsport.

The following year, Taoufik moved to the OK and won the 2017 CIK-FIA European Championship with the same team. He was also awarded the 2017 Rookie of the year award by the FIA at only 16 years of age, the youngest in their history.

=== Formula Renault ===
In March 2018, Taoufik signed with Arden International to take part in the Formula Renault Eurocup.

== Racing record ==
=== Career summary ===
| Season | Series | Team | Races | Wins | Poles | F. Laps | Podiums | Points | Position |
|---|---|---|---|---|---|---|---|---|---|
| 2017–18 | Formula 4 UAE Championship | Silberpfeil Energy Dubai | 7 | 0 | 0 | 1 | 1 | 51 | 13th |
| 2018 | Formula Renault Eurocup | Arden | 20 | 0 | 0 | 0 | 0 | 1 | 22nd |
| 2018 | Formula Renault NEC | Arden | 8 | 0 | 0 | 0 | 0 | 0 | NC† |
| 2019 | TCR Europe Touring Car Series | Comtoyou Racing | 2 | 0 | 0 | 0 | 0 | 3 | 36th |
| 2019 | TCR BeNeLux Touring Car Championship | Comtoyou Racing | 2 | 0 | 0 | 0 | 0 | 36 | 14th |
| 2019 | ADAC TCR Germany Touring Car Championship | Comtoyou Racing | 2 | 0 | 0 | 0 | 0 | 0 | NC† |
| 2020 | TCR Europe Touring Car Series | Comtoyou Racing | 12 | 0 | 0 | 2 | 2 | 157 | 12th |
| 2021 | TCR Europe Touring Car Series | Sébastien Loeb Racing | 14 | 0 | 0 | 1 | 2 | 216 | 9th |
| 2024 | TCR World Tour | Volcano Motorsport | 4 | 0 | 0 | 0 | 0 | 24 | 15th |
| 2024 | TCR Italy Touring Car Championship | Volcano Motorsport | 2 | 0 | 0 | 0 | 0 | 0 | NC† |

^{†} As Taoufik was a guest driver, he was ineligible for points.

=== Complete Formula 4 UAE Championship results ===
(key) (Races in bold indicate pole position) (Races in italics indicate fastest lap)

| Year | Team | 1 | 2 | 3 | 4 | 5 | 6 | 7 | 8 | 9 | 10 | 11 | 12 | 13 | 14 | 15 | 16 | 17 | 18 | 19 | 20 | 21 | 22 | 23 | 24 | Pos | Points |
|---|---|---|---|---|---|---|---|---|---|---|---|---|---|---|---|---|---|---|---|---|---|---|---|---|---|---|---|
| 2017–18 | Silberpfeil Energy Dubai | YMC1; 1 | YMC1; 2 | YMC1; 3 | YMC1; 4 | YMC1; 1 | YMC1; 2 | YMC1; 3 | YMC1; 4 | DUB1; 1; 5 | DUB1; 2; 7 | DUB1; 3 Ret | DUB1; 4 C | YMC3; 1; 4 | YMC3; 2; 12 | YMC3; 3; 2 | YMC3; 4; 8 | YMC4; 1 | YMC4; 2 | YMC4; 3 | YMC4; 4 | DUB2; 1 | DUB2; 2 | DUB2; 3 | DUB2; 4 | 13th | 51 |

=== Complete Formula Renault Eurocup results ===
(key) (Races in bold indicate pole position) (Races in italics indicate fastest lap)

| Year | Team | 1 | 2 | 3 | 4 | 5 | 6 | 7 | 8 | 9 | 10 | 11 | 12 | 13 | 14 | 15 | 16 | 17 | 18 | 19 | 20 | Pos | Points |
|---|---|---|---|---|---|---|---|---|---|---|---|---|---|---|---|---|---|---|---|---|---|---|---|
| 2018 | Arden | LEC; 1; 23 | LEC; 2; 13 | MNZ; 1; 17 | MNZ; 2; 13 | SIL; 1; 13 | SIL; 2; 13 | MON; 1 Ret | MON; 2 Ret | RBR; 1 Ret | RBR; 2; 16 | SPA; 1; 17 | SPA; 2 Ret | HUN; 1; 16 | HUN; 2; 10 | NÜR; 1; 17 | NÜR; 2; 14 | HOC; 1; 19 | HOC; 2; 12 | CAT; 1 Ret | CAT; 2; 15 | 22nd | 1 |

=== Complete Formula Renault NEC results ===
(key) (Races in bold indicate pole position) (Races in italics indicate fastest lap)

| Year | Entrant | 1 | 2 | 3 | 4 | 5 | 6 | 7 | 8 | 9 | 10 | 11 | 12 | DC | Points |
|---|---|---|---|---|---|---|---|---|---|---|---|---|---|---|---|
| 2018 | Arden | PAU; 1 | PAU; 2 | MNZ; 1 | MNZ; 2 | SPA; 1; 17 | SPA; 2 Ret | HUN; 1; 16 | HUN; 2; 10 | NÜR; 1; 17 | NÜR; 2; 14 | HOC; 1; 19 | HOC; 2; 12 | NC† | 0 |

† As Taoufik was a guest driver, he was ineligible for points

=== Complete TCR Europe Touring Car Series results ===
(key) (Races in bold indicate pole position) (Races in italics indicate fastest lap)

| Year | Team | Car | 1 | 2 | 3 | 4 | 5 | 6 | 7 | 8 | 9 | 10 | 11 | 12 | 13 | 14 | DC | Points |
|---|---|---|---|---|---|---|---|---|---|---|---|---|---|---|---|---|---|---|
| 2019 | Comtoyou Racing | Audi RS 3 LMS TCR | HUN; 1 | HUN; 2 | HOC; 1 | HOC; 2 | SPA; 1 | SPA; 2 | RBR; 1 | RBR; 2 | OSC; 1 | OSC; 2 | CAT; 1 | CAT; 2 | MNZ; 1; 14 | MNZ; 2; 22 | 36th | 2 |
| 2020 | Comtoyou Racing | Audi RS 3 LMS TCR | LEC; 1; 9^{9} | LEC; 2; 18 | ZOL; 1; 11^{4} | ZOL; 2; 11 | MNZ; 1; 16 | MNZ; 2; 12 | CAT; 1; 3^{6} | CAT; 2; 2 | SPA; 1; 7^{6} | SPA; 2; 13 | JAR; 1; 10 | JAR; 2 Ret | | | 12th | 157 |
| 2021 | Sébastien Loeb Racing | Hyundai Elantra N TCR | SVK; 1; 17 | SVK; 2 Ret | LEC; 1 Ret | LEC; 2; 3 | ZAN; 1; 10 | ZAN; 2; 7 | SPA; 1; 4 | SPA; 2; 6 | NÜR; 1; 9 | NÜR; 2; 12 | MNZ; 1; 5 | MNZ; 2; 10 | CAT; 1; 3 | CAT; 2; 15 | 9th | 216 |

=== Complete TCR World Tour results ===
(key) (Races in bold indicate pole position) (Races in italics indicate fastest lap)

| Year | Team | Car | 1 | 2 | 3 | 4 | 5 | 6 | 7 | 8 | 9 | 10 | 11 | 12 | 13 | 14 | DC | Points |
|---|---|---|---|---|---|---|---|---|---|---|---|---|---|---|---|---|---|---|
| 2024 | Volcano Motorsport | Audi RS 3 LMS TCR | VAL; 1 Ret | VAL; 2 Ret | MRK; 1; 10 | MRK; 2; 6 | MOH; 1 | MOH; 2 | SAP; 1 | SAP; 2 | ELP; 1 | ELP; 2 | ZHZ; 1 | ZHZ; 2 | MAC; 1 | MAC; 2 | 15th | 24 |
