= Franco Girolami =

Argentine motor racing driver (born 1992)

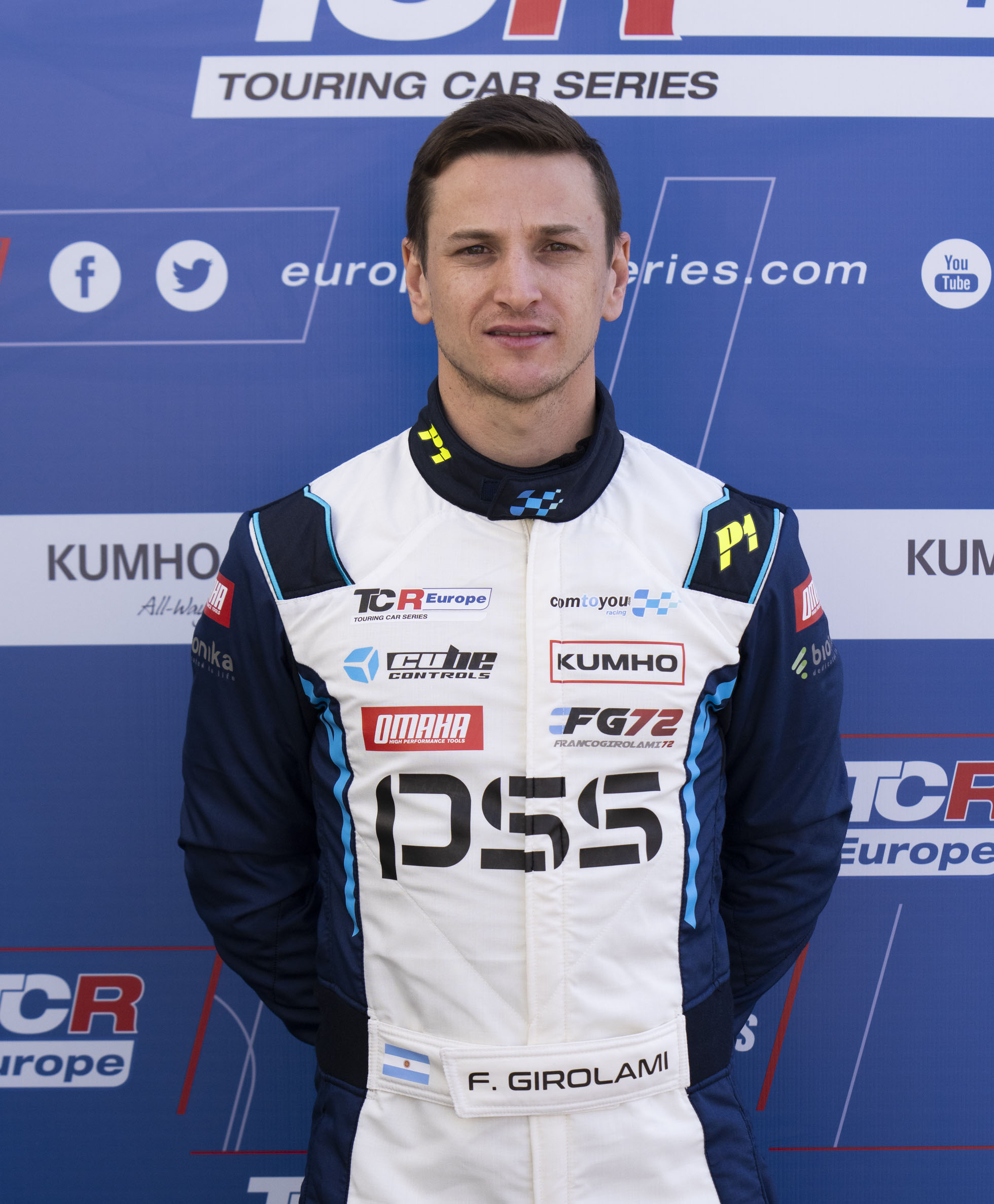
- Girolami in 2022
- Nationality: (Argentina) Argentine
- Born: 14 February 1992 (age 34) Isla Verde, Cordoba Province, Argentina
- Relatives: Néstor Girolami (brother)

TCR Europe career
- Categorisation: FIA Silver

Franco Girolami (born February 14, 1992) is an Argentine motor racing driver. He won Formula Renault Plus, TC2000, Top Race V6, TCR Europe and TCR Italy championships.

Girolami is the brother of the WTCR driver Néstor Girolami.

== Racing career ==
Girolami started his sports career in 2008, focusing on the next years in open-wheel championships. In 2011, he won the Formula Renault Plus championship and was runner-up in Formula Renault Argentina. In the next year, he was TC2000 champion with six wins in ten races.

In 2013, Girolami made his debut in Súper TC2000 with the Chevrolet Argentina factory team, and the next year in Top Race V6.

Girolami returned to being a full-time Súper TC2000 driver only in 2020 with Fiat Racing Team. Between 2015 and 2019, he raced with Gabriel Furlán's team in TRV6, with Mitsubishi cars. He won the title in 2018 with three wins and one point ahead of seven-time champion Agustín Canapino. Third was his brother Néstor. In 2019, he won five races and was second in the championship, behind Matías Rossi, while in 2020, he won two races and finished third.

Girolami's first race in a championship outside of Argentina was in 2018, in Stock Car Brasil, invited by Denis Navarro. In 2020, he participated in rounds of TCR Italy and TCR Europe championships. He won the first race of 2021 TCR Italy at Misano after starting in pole position. Weeks later, he also achieved his first victory in TCR Europe, at Zandvoort, and became the championship leader. He won for the second time at Monza, but lost the championship to Mikel Azcona.

In 2022, Girolami claimed the TCR Europe title in his first season with Audi Sport Team Comtoyou PSS. He had four wins and podiums at all rounds, outscoring runner-up Tom Coronel by more than 100 points. The following year, he won the TCR Italy Touring Car Championship with Aikoa Racing.

== Racing record ==
=== Racing career summary ===
Season	Series	Team	Races	Wins	Poles	F/Laps	Podiums	Points	Position
2008	Fórmula Metropolitana	s/d	3	0	0	0	0	13	16th
2008	Fórmula Renault Argentina	Litoral Group	2	0	0	0	0	2	35th
2009	Fórmula Renault Argentina	Damiano FB MS	12	0	0	0	0	25	14th
2009	Top Race Junior	Crespi Competición	1	0	0	0	0	5	36th
2010	Fórmula Renault Argentina	Gastón Dammiano Motorsport	11	2	1	0	5	117	4th
2011	TC Mouras	Savino Sport	2	0	0	0	0	14,75	35th
2011	Top Race Series	Fiat Linea Competizione	1	0	0	0	0	N/A	NC
2011	Fórmula Renault Plus	HRC Pro Team	9	4	6	2	6	163	**1st**
2011	Fórmula Renault Argentina	HRC Pro Team	12	2	2	2	5	145	**2nd**
2012	TC2000	Pro Rally; Pro Racing	10	6	7	4	8	219	**1st**
2012	TC Mouras	MG Racing	2	0	0	1	0	17	35th
2013	Súper TC2000	Equipo YPF Chevrolet	12	0	0	1	0	51	17th
2013	TC Pista	JC Competición	7	0	0	0	0	92,5	38th
2014	Fórmula Renault Plus	Barovero Racing Team	2	0	2	1	1	27	27th
2014	Top Race V6	ABH Sport	2	0	0	0	0	11	26th
2014	TC Pista	JC Competición	2	0	0	0	0	12,5	40th
2015	Súper TC2000	Toyota Team Argentina	1	0	0	0	0	N/A	NC
2015	Top Race V6	Mitsubishi GF Racing	13	1	0	0	2	74	16th
2016	Top Race V6	Mitsubishi GF Racing	16	4	1	1	4	113	4th
2016	TC2000	Escudería Río de la Plata	1	0	0	0	0	N/A	NC
2016	Súper TC2000	Toyota Team Argentina	1	0	0	0	0	N/A	NC
2017	Top Race V6	Mitsubishi 3M Racing	15	1	1	3	6	117	6th
2017	Súper TC2000	Team Peugeot Total Argentina	1	0	0	0	0	N/A	NC
2018	Top Race V6	3M Top Race Team	13	3	2	1	7	169	**1st**
2018	Súper TC2000	Team Peugeot Total Argentina	1	0	0	0	0	N/A	NC
2018	TC2000	Escudería Fela	1	0	0	0	0	N/A	NC
2018	Stock Car Brasil	Cavaleiro Sports	1	0	0	0	0	N/A	NC
2019	Top Race V6	GF Racing	16	5	5	4	9	277	**2nd**
2019	Súper TC2000	Chevrolet YPF	3	0	0	0	0	3	19th
2020	Top Race V6	Azar Motorsport	10	2	2	1	6	154	**3rd**
2020	Súper TC2000	Fiat Racing Team STC2000	11	0	0	0	0	0	18th
2020	TCR Europe Touring Car Series	PSS Racing Team	2	0	0	0	0	3	31st
2020	TCR Italy Touring Car Championship	MM Motorsport	4	0	0	0	1	30	17th
2021	TCR Europe Touring Car Series	PSS Racing Team	14	2	1	1	5	353	**2nd**
2021	TCR Italy Touring Car Championship	MM Motorsport	2	1	1	0	1	N/A	NC
2022	TCR Europe Touring Car Series	Audi Sport Team Comtoyou PSS	13	4	1	4	9	431	**1st**
2022	GT World Challenge Europe Endurance Cup	Madpanda Motorsport	1	0	0	0	0	0	NC
2022	GT World Challenge Europe Endurance Cup - Silver Cup	Madpanda Motorsport	1	0	0	0	0	0	NC
2022	Stock Car Pro Series	Cavaleiro Sports	1	0	0	0	0	0	NC
2022	World Touring Car Cup	Comtoyou Team Audi Sport	4	0	0	0	0	16	18th
2023	TCR Italy Touring Car Championship	Aikoa Racing	12	2	1	2	10	427	**1st**
2023	24H TCE Series - TCR	Aikoa Racing	1	1	1	1	1	40	NC†
2024	TCR Europe Touring Car Series	Monlau Motorsport	12	4	3	6	7	395	**1st**
2024	TCR Eastern Europe Trophy	Monlau Motorsport	2	1	2	1	1	0	NC†
2026	Michelin Pilot Challenge - TCR	Victor Gonzalez Racing Team							

^{*} Season still in progress.

=== Complete TCR Europe Touring Car Series results ===
(key) (Races in bold indicate pole position) (Races in italics indicate fastest lap)

Year	Team	Car	1	2	3	4	5	6	7	8	9	10	11	12	13	14	DC	Points
2020	PSS Racing Team	Honda Civic Type R TCR (FK8)	LEC; 1	LEC; 2	ZOL; 1	ZOL; 2	MNZ; 1	MNZ; 2	CAT; 1	CAT; 2	SPA; 1	SPA; 2	JAR; 1 Ret	JAR; 2; 14			31st	3
2021	PSS Racing Team	Honda Civic Type R TCR (FK8)	SVK; 1; 12	SVK; 2; 3	LEC; 1; 7	LEC; 2; 5	ZAN; 1; 5	ZAN; 2; 1	SPA; 1; 5	SPA; 2; 7	NÜR; 1; 2	NÜR; 2; 2	**MNZ**; **1**; 1	MNZ; 2; 19	CAT; 1; 17	CAT; 2; 5	2nd	353
2022	Audi Sport Team Comtoyou PSS	Audi RS 3 LMS TCR (2021)	ALG; 1; 5	ALG; 2; 1	LEC; 1; 2	LEC; 2; 4	**SPA**; **1**; 2	SPA; 2; 4	NOR; 1; 3	NOR; 2; 1	NÜR; 1; 3	NÜR; 2 C	MNZ; 1; 12	MNZ; 2; 1	CAT; 1; 3	CAT; 2; 1	1st	431
2024	Monlau Motorsport	Cupra León VZ TCR	**VAL**; **1**; 1^{1}	VAL; 2; 2	ZOL; 1; 4^{4}	ZOL; 2; 3	**SAL**; **1**; 1^{1}	SAL; 2; 11	SPA; 1; 2	SPA; 2; 8	**BRN**; **1**; 1^{1}	BRN; 2; 9	CRT; 1; 1^{2}	CRT; 2; 6			1st	395

^{†} Driver did not finish, but was classified as he completed over 75% of the race distance.

=== Complete World Touring Car Cup results ===
(key) (Races in bold indicate pole position) (Races in italics indicate fastest lap)

Year	Team	Car	1	2	3	4	5	6	7	8	9	10	11	12	13	14	15	16	17	18	DC	Points
2022	Comtoyou Racing	Audi RS 3 LMS TCR	FRA; 1	FRA; 2	GER; 1	GER; 2	HUN; 1	HUN; 2	ESP; 1	ESP; 2	POR; 1	POR; 2	ITA; 1	ITA; 2	ALS; 1	ALS; 2	BHR; 1; 14‡	BHR; 2; 7‡			18th	16
2022	Comtoyou Team Audi Sport	Audi RS 3 LMS TCR																	SAU; 1; 4	SAU; 2 Ret	18th	16

^{‡} As Girolami was a Wildcard entry, he was ineligible to score points.

=== Stock Car Brasil results ===
Year	Team	Car	1	2	3	4	5	6	7	8	9	10	11	12	13	14	15	16	17	18	19	20	21	22	23	Rank	Points
2022	Lubrax Podium	Chevrolet Cruze	INT; 1; 21	GOI; 1	GOI; 2	VCA; 1	VCA; 2	RIO; 1	RIO; 2	BRA; 1	BRA; 2	BRA; 1	BRA; 2	INT; 1	INT; 2	SCZ; 1	SCZ; 2	VCA; 1	VCA; 2	GOI; 1	GOI; 2	GOI; 1	GOI; 2	BRA; 1	BRA; 2	NC†	0†

^{†} As Girolami was a guest driver he was ineligible to score points.

Sporting positions
Preceded by Inaugural	Fórmula Renault Plus; Champion; 2011	Succeeded by Marcos Abratte
Preceded by Matías Rossi	TC2000 Championship; Champion; 2012	Succeeded by Matías Milla
Preceded by Agustín Canapino	Top Race V6; Champion; 2018	Succeeded by Matías Rossi
Preceded by Mikel Azcona	TCR Europe Touring Car Series; Champion; 2022	Succeeded by Tom Coronel
Preceded by Niels Langeveld	TCR Italy Touring Car Championship; Champion; 2023	Succeeded by Nicolas Taylor
Preceded by Tom Coronel	TCR Europe Touring Car Series; Champion; 2024	Succeeded by Jenson Brickley
