= Isidro Callejas =

Spanish racing driver (born 2004)

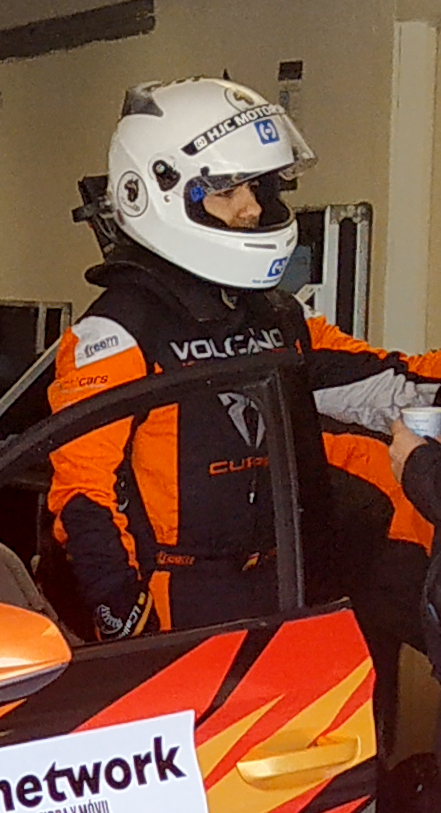
- Callejas in 2022
- Nationality: (Spain) Spanish
- Born: 24 June 2004 (age 22) Córdoba, Spain

Championship titles
- 2022: TCR Spain
Medal record
Touring Car Racing
Representing Spain
FIA Motorsport Games
Silver medal – second place	2022 Marseille	Touring Car Cup

Isidro Callejas Gómez (born 24 June 2004) is a Spanish racing driver who last competed in TCR Europe for Volcano Motorsport.

== Career ==
Callejas began karting in 2014, competing until 2019. During his karting career, Callejas most notably won the Micro class of the Spanish Rotax Series in 2015, as well as finishing third in the Alevin standings of the Spanish Karting Championship. In 2018, Callejas represented Spain in the Karting Academy Trophy, finishing ninth in points in his only season in the series.

Moving up to cars in 2019, Callejas raced in the Copa Kobe de Circuitos, finishing ninth in points with a best result of fourth at Jarama. The following year, Callejas moved to Chefo Sport to compete in Renault Clio Cup Spain and the CER D2 class of Campeonato de España de Resistencia. In the former, Callejas won both races at Jerez and took three more podiums to secure third in points despite missing the finale. In the latter, Callejas scored a lone win at Valencia and four other podiums to also finish third in points. During 2020, Callejas also made a one-off appearance in TCR Ibérico for the same team at Jerez.

Stepping up to TCR full time in 2021, Callejas joined Brutal Fish Racing Team to compete in TCR Europe. In his first season in the series, Callejas scored his only podium of the season at Zandvoort, as well as his only pole position at the Nürburgring en route to an 11th-place points finish, as the rookie champion. During 2021, Callejas also made select appearances in TCR Spain for Escudería Costa Daurada and Volcano Motorsport, scoring four podiums and finishing sixth in points.

The following year, Callejas returned to Volcano Motorsport for a dual campaign in TCR Europe and TCR Spain. In TCR Europe, Callejas became the series' youngest race winner at Spa, and scored points in all but one race he started to end the year fourth in points. In TCR Spain, Callejas began the year by scoring four wins between the Jarama and Jerez rounds, before taking further wins at Aragón and Navarra, and ending the year with a triple win at Barcelona to clinch the series title. During 2022, Callejas represented Spain in the FIA Motorsport Games Touring Car Cup, in which he scored a silver medal in the main race.

== Karting record ==
=== Karting career summary ===
Season	Series	Team	Position
2014	Spanish Karting Championship — Alevin		12th
2015	Spanish Karting Championship — Alevin		3rd
2016	Spanish Karting Championship — Cadet		6th
2017	WSK Super Master Series — OK-J	Chiesa Corse	86th
2017	Karting European Championship — OK-J	Chiesa Corse	58th
2017	Coupe de France — OK-J	Chiesa Corse	7th
2017	Spanish Karting Championship — Junior		5th
2017	Karting World Championship — OK-J	Unomatricula K-Team	NC
2018	IAME Winter Series — X30 Junior	Unomatricula K-Team	31st
2018	WSK Super Master Series — OK-J	Unomatricula K-Team	121st
2018	Karting European Championship — OK-J	Unomatricula K-Team	94th
2018	Spanish Karting Championship — Junior		15th
2018	Karting Academy Trophy	Gomez Sanchez Maria Paloma	9th
2019	IAME Winter Series — X30 Senior	Kart Republic Spain	30th

== Racing record ==
=== Racing career summary ===
Season	Series	Team	Races	Wins	Poles	F/Laps	Podiums	Points	Position
2019	Copa Kobe de Circuitos	RACE	8	0	0	1	0	138.5	9th
2020	Campeonato de España de Resistencia – CER D2	Chefo Sport	7	2	0	0	5	176.8	**3rd**
2020	Renault Clio Cup Spain	Chefo Sport	10	1	3	2	5	626	**3rd**
2020	TCR Ibérico	Chefo Sport	2	0	0	0	0	22	10th
2021	TCR Europe Touring Car Series	Brutal Fish Racing Team	14	0	1	0	1	204	11th
2021	TCR Spain	Escudería Costa Daurada	3	0	0	0	3	164	6th
2021	TCR Spain	Volcano Motorsport	3	0	0	0	1	164	6th
2022	TCR Europe Touring Car Series	Volcano Motorsport	13	1	0	2	1	275	4th
2022	TCR Spain	Volcano Motorsport	15	10	3	11	15	556	**1st**
2022	FIA Motorsport Games Touring Car Cup	Team Spain	1	0	0	0	1	—N/a	**2nd**

=== Complete TCR Europe Touring Car Series results ===
(key) (Races in bold indicate pole position) (Races in italics indicate fastest lap)

Year	Team	Car	1	2	3	4	5	6	7	8	9	10	11	12	13	14	DC	Points
2021	Brutal Fish Racing Team	Honda Civic Type R TCR (FK8)	SVK; 1; 18^{8}	SVK; 2; 7	LEC; 1 Ret	LEC; 2; 10	ZAN; 1; 8^{6}	ZAN; 2; 3	SPA; 1; 9^{9}	SPA; 2; 4	**NÜR**; **1**; 7^{1}	NÜR; 2; 10	MNZ; 1 Ret	MNZ; 2; 11	CAT; 1; 5^{9}	CAT; 2 DSQ	11th	204
2022	Volcano Motorsport	Cupra León Competición TCR	ALG; 1; 4	ALG; 2; 8	LEC; 1; 11	LEC; 2; 7	SPA; 1; 1	SPA; 2; 7	NOR; 1; 5	NOR; 2; 5	NÜR; 1; 10	NÜR; 2 C	MNZ; 1; 8	MNZ; 2 NC	CAT; 1; 5	CAT; 2; 6	4th	275

^{†} Driver did not finish, but was classified as he completed over 75% of the race distance.
