= 2021 TCR Europe Touring Car Series =

European motorsport championship

The 2021 TCR Europe Touring Car Series was the sixth season of TCR Europe Touring Car Series. The season began at the Slovakiaring in May and ended at the Circuit de Barcelona-Catalunya in October.

Mikel Azcona won the drivers' championship for the second time and Sébastien Loeb Racing won the teams' championship for the first time.

== Calendar ==
The calendar was announced on 23 December 2020 with 7 rounds scheduled.

Rnd.		Circuit/Location	Date	Supporting
1	1	Automotodróm Slovakia Ring, Orechová Potôň, Slovakia	7–9 May	TCR Eastern Europe Trophy
1	2	Automotodróm Slovakia Ring, Orechová Potôň, Slovakia	7–9 May	TCR Eastern Europe Trophy
2	3	Circuit Paul Ricard, Le Castellet, France	28–30 May	GT World Challenge Europe Endurance Cup
2	4	Circuit Paul Ricard, Le Castellet, France	28–30 May	GT World Challenge Europe Endurance Cup
3	5	Circuit Zandvoort, Zandvoort, Netherlands	18–20 June	GT World Challenge Europe Sprint Cup
3	6	Circuit Zandvoort, Zandvoort, Netherlands	18–20 June	GT World Challenge Europe Sprint Cup
4	7	Circuit de Spa-Francorchamps, Stavelot, Belgium	29–31 July	Spa 24 Hours
4	8	Circuit de Spa-Francorchamps, Stavelot, Belgium	29–31 July	Spa 24 Hours
5	9	Nürburgring, Nürburg, Germany	3–5 September	GT World Challenge Europe Endurance Cup
5	10	Nürburgring, Nürburg, Germany	3–5 September	GT World Challenge Europe Endurance Cup
6	11	Autodromo Nazionale Monza, Monza, Italy	24–26 September	International GT Open; F4 French Championship
6	12	Autodromo Nazionale Monza, Monza, Italy	24–26 September	International GT Open; F4 French Championship
7	13	Circuit de Barcelona-Catalunya, Montmeló, Spain	8–10 October	GT World Challenge Europe Endurance Cup
7	14	Circuit de Barcelona-Catalunya, Montmeló, Spain	8–10 October	GT World Challenge Europe Endurance Cup

=== Calendar Changes ===
- The Circuito del Jarama and Circuit of Zolder rounds were dropped out of the calendar
- Nurburgring and Slovakiaring were included in the calendar.

== Teams and drivers ==
Hankook was the official tyre supplier.

Team	Car	No.	Drivers	Class	Rounds	Ref.
(Slovenia) Lema Racing	CUPRA León Competición TCR	3	(Italy) Giacomo Ghermandi		7	
(Spain) RC2 Junior Team	CUPRA León Competición TCR	5	(Spain) Rubén Fernández	Y	6	
(Spain) RC2 Junior Team	CUPRA León Competición TCR	19	(Spain) Felipe Fernández	R	7	
(Spain) RC2 Junior Team	CUPRA León Competición TCR	101	(Venezuela) Sergio Lopez Bolotin	R	6–7	
(Belgium) Comtoyou Racing	Audi RS 3 LMS TCR	8	(Belgium) Nicolas Baert	J	All	
(Belgium) Comtoyou Racing	Audi RS 3 LMS TCR	32	(Netherlands) Tom Coronel		All	
(Belgium) Comtoyou Racing	Audi RS 3 LMS TCR	162	(Serbia) Dušan Borković		All	
(France) Sébastien Loeb Racing	Hyundai Elantra N TCR	10	(Netherlands) Niels Langeveld		All	
(France) Sébastien Loeb Racing	Hyundai Elantra N TCR	25	(Morocco) Sami Taoufik	J	All	
(France) Sébastien Loeb Racing	Hyundai Elantra N TCR	44	(Italy) Felice Jelmini		All	
(France) Sébastien Loeb Racing	Hyundai Elantra N TCR	250	(Morocco) Mehdi Bennani		All	
(Denmark) Brianmadsen Sport	Peugeot 308 TCR	11	(Denmark) Gustav Birch	R	3, 6	
(Russia) VRC Team	Audi RS 3 LMS TCR	14	(Russia) Klim Gavrilov	J	1–6	
(Spain) Volcano Motorsport	CUPRA León Competición TCR	14	(Russia) Klim Gavrilov	J	7	
(Spain) Volcano Motorsport	CUPRA León Competición TCR	16	(Russia) Evgeni Leonov		1–4, 6–7	
(Spain) Volcano Motorsport	CUPRA León Competición TCR	96	(Spain) Mikel Azcona		1–2, 4–7	
(Slovakia) Brutal Fish Racing Team	Honda Civic Type R TCR (FK8)	17	(Slovakia) Martin Ryba	Y	All	
(Slovakia) Brutal Fish Racing Team	Honda Civic Type R TCR (FK8)	26	(Spain) Isidro Callejas	R	All	
(Slovakia) Brutal Fish Racing Team	Honda Civic Type R TCR (FK8)	62	(United Kingdom) Jack Young	J	All	
(France) Team Clairet Sport	Peugeot 308 TCR	20	(France) Teddy Clairet		All	
(France) Team Clairet Sport	Peugeot 308 TCR	21	(France) Jimmy Clairet		All	
(France) Team Clairet Sport	CUPRA León TCR	66	(France) Gilles Colombani	Y	All	
(France) Team Clairet Sport	CUPRA León TCR	77	(France) Sylvain Pussier	Y	All	
(Czech Republic) Janík Motorsport	Hyundai i30 N TCR	24	(Czech Republic) Jáchym Galáš	R	All	
(Czech Republic) Janík Motorsport	Hyundai i30 N TCR	70	(Slovakia) Maťo Homola		All	
(Slovakia) Horňák-Aditis	Audi RS 3 LMS TCR	38	(Czech Republic) Petr Čížek	Y	6	
(Slovakia) Horňák-Aditis	Audi RS 3 LMS TCR	97	(Poland) Bartosz Groszek	R	6	
(Poland) BTC Maszyny Racing	Audi RS 3 LMS TCR	53	(Poland) Łukasz Stolarczyk	R	5–6	
(North Macedonia) PSS Racing Team	Honda Civic Type R TCR (FK8)	72	(Argentina) Franco Girolami		All	
(North Macedonia) PSS Racing Team	Honda Civic Type R TCR (FK8)	110	(North Macedonia) Viktor Davidovski	Y	1–3, 5–7	
(Italy) Trico WRT	Hyundai i30 N TCR	81	(Italy) Damiano Reduzzi	Y	6	
(Hungary) Zengő Motorsport	CUPRA León Competición TCR	99	(Hungary) Dániel Nagy		1	

Icon	Class
R	Eligible for TCR Europe Rookie Trophy
J	Eligible for TCR Europe Junior Trophy
Y	Eligible for TCR Europe Diamond Trophy
G	Guest drivers ineligible to score points

=== Summary ===
- SMC Junior Motorsport will enter a Peugeot 308 TCR for Fernando Navarrete, who will be competing in a partial campaign during the season
- Brutal Fish Racing will enter three Honda Civic Type R TCR, as last year. Martin Ryba, Isidro Callejas and Jack Young are confirmed. Dan Lloyd left the series to return the British Touring Car Championship and join Power Maxed Racing, but will remain within the team as a driver coach.
- Tom Coronel will move from Boutsen Ginion Racing to Comtoyou Racing to replace Mehdi Bennani and he will be joined by 2020 TCR Eastern Europe winner Dušan Borković who returns to the series after having last raced in 2019 for Autodis Racing by Target Competition to replace Sami Taoufik.
- After running a partial campaign during the 2020 season, Volcano Motorsport will enter the series full-time, but will enter two all new Cupra León Competición TCR cars for Evgeni Leonov and Mikel Azcona.
- Sébastien Loeb Racing will enter four Hyundai Elantra N TCR cars during the season. Niels Langeveld, Felice Jelmini and Sami Taoufik have been confirmed to be three of the team's entries, Mehdi Bennani returns to the team.
- Team Clairet Sport will enter two Peugeot 308 TCR and two Cupra Leon TCR. Teddy Clairet, Jimmy Clairet and Gilles Colombani were remained at the team but Gilles Colombani will switch from Peugeot 308 TCR to Cupra León TCR and Sylvain Pussier returned to the series and Team Clairet Sport to replace Stéphane Ventaja.
- Dániel Nagy will move from Hyundai i30 N TCR to Cupra León Competición TCR and return to Zengő Motorsport.

== Results and standings ==
=== Season summary ===
Rnd.		Circuit/Location	Pole position	Fastest lap	Winning driver	Winning team	Winning Rookie driver	Winning Junior driver	Winning Diamond driver
1	1	Automotodróm Slovakia Ring	(Netherlands) Tom Coronel	(Spain) Mikel Azcona	(Spain) Mikel Azcona	(Spain) Volcano Motorsport	(Czech Republic) Jáchym Galáš	(Belgium) Nicolas Baert	(Slovakia) Martin Ryba
1	2	Automotodróm Slovakia Ring		(Spain) Mikel Azcona	(Morocco) Mehdi Bennani	(France) Sébastien Loeb Racing	(Spain) Isidro Callejas	(Russia) Klim Gavrilov	(Slovakia) Martin Ryba
2	3	(France) Circuit Paul Ricard	(France) Teddy Clairet	(Italy) Felice Jelmini	(France) Teddy Clairet	(France) Team Clairet Sport	(Czech Republic) Jáchym Galáš	(United Kingdom) Jack Young	(North Macedonia) Viktor Davidovski
2	4	(France) Circuit Paul Ricard		(United Kingdom) Jack Young	(France) Jimmy Clairet	(France) Team Clairet Sport	(Spain) Isidro Callejas	(Morocco) Sami Taoufik	(North Macedonia) Viktor Davidovski
3	5	(Netherlands) Circuit Zandvoort	(United Kingdom) Jack Young	(Netherlands) Tom Coronel	(Netherlands) Tom Coronel	(Belgium) Comtoyou Racing	(Spain) Isidro Callejas	(United Kingdom) Jack Young	(North Macedonia) Viktor Davidovski
3	6	(Netherlands) Circuit Zandvoort		(Argentina) Franco Girolami	(Argentina) Franco Girolami	(North Macedonia) PSS Racing Team	(Spain) Isidro Callejas	(Morocco) Sami Taoufik	(North Macedonia) Viktor Davidovski
4	7	(Belgium) Circuit de Spa-Francorchamps	(Italy) Felice Jelmini	(Spain) Mikel Azcona	(Spain) Mikel Azcona	(Spain) Volcano Motorsport	(Spain) Isidro Callejas	(Morocco) Sami Taoufik	(Slovakia) Martin Ryba
4	8	(Belgium) Circuit de Spa-Francorchamps		(Russia) Klim Gavrilov	(Spain) Mikel Azcona	(Spain) Volcano Motorsport	(Spain) Isidro Callejas	(Morocco) Sami Taoufik	(Slovakia) Martin Ryba
5	9	(Germany) Nürburgring	(Spain) Isidro Callejas	(Netherlands) Niels Langeveld	(Spain) Mikel Azcona	(Spain) Volcano Motorsport	(Spain) Isidro Callejas	(Russia) Klim Gavrilov	(Slovakia) Martin Ryba
5	10	(Germany) Nürburgring		(Spain) Mikel Azcona	(Spain) Mikel Azcona	(Spain) Volcano Motorsport	(Czech Republic) Jáchym Galáš	(United Kingdom) Jack Young	(North Macedonia) Viktor Davidovski
6	11	(Italy) Autodromo Nazionale Monza	(Argentina) Franco Girolami	(Spain) Mikel Azcona	(Argentina) Franco Girolami	(North Macedonia) PSS Racing Team	(Poland) Bartosz Groszek	(Morocco) Sami Taoufik	(North Macedonia) Viktor Davidovski
6	12	(Italy) Autodromo Nazionale Monza		(United Kingdom) Jack Young	(Slovakia) Maťo Homola	(Czech Republic) Janík Motorsport	(Spain) Isidro Callejas	(United Kingdom) Jack Young	(France) Sylvain Pussier
7	13	(Spain) Circuit de Barcelona-Catalunya	(Spain) Mikel Azcona	(Spain) Mikel Azcona	(Spain) Mikel Azcona	(Spain) Volcano Motorsport	(Spain) Isidro Callejas	(Morocco) Sami Taoufik	(Slovakia) Martin Ryba
7	14	(Spain) Circuit de Barcelona-Catalunya		(Morocco) Sami Taoufik	(Russia) Klim Gavrilov	(Spain) Volcano Motorsport	(Czech Republic) Jáchym Galáš	(Russia) Klim Gavrilov	(France) Gilles Colombani

==== Drivers' standings ====
Scoring system

Position	**1st**	**2nd**	**3rd**	**4th**	**5th**	**6th**	**7th**	**8th**	**9th**	**10th**	**11th**	**12th**	**13th**	**14th**	**15th**
Qualifying	10	9	8	7	6	5	4	3	2	1	—N/a				
Race	40	35	30	27	24	21	18	15	13	11	9	7	5	3	1

Pos.	Driver	SVK (Slovakia)		LEC (France)		ZAN (Netherlands)		SPA (Belgium)		NUR (Germany)		MNZ (Italy)		BAR (Spain)		Pts.
1	(Spain) Mikel Azcona	1^{2}	2	6^{8}	2			1^{4}	1	1^{5}	1	2^{7}	4	**1**^{1}	WD	432
2	(Argentina) Franco Girolami	12^{6}	3	7^{9}	5	5^{7}	1	5^{7}	7	2^{2}	2	**1**^{1}	19	17	5	353
3	(Netherlands) Niels Langeveld	4	21†	4^{5}	Ret	4^{9}	2	8	5	3^{3}	4	10	14	6^{6}	4	295
4	(Netherlands) Tom Coronel	**5**^{1}	6	9	8	1^{2}	Ret	10	10	5^{6}	Ret	3^{4}	2	14	WD	258
5	(Morocco) Mehdi Bennani	6^{10}	1	18^{2}	6	12^{5}	6	2^{2}	9	11	14	21†	12	10^{7}	2	252
6	(France) Jimmy Clairet	Ret	9	3^{7}	1	7^{8}	5	13	11	15	11	4^{8}	6	9	16	247
7	(Belgium) Nicolas Baert	2^{3}	8	15	13	6^{4}	8	6^{6}	8	14	8	8^{10}	8	4^{4}	8	242
8	(France) Teddy Clairet	Ret	14	**1**^{1}	Ret	16	13	7^{8}	3	4^{4}	7	Ret	9	2^{3}	3	220
9	(Morocco) Sami Taoufik	17	Ret	Ret^{4}	3	10^{10}	7	4^{5}	6	9	12	5	10	3^{2}	15	216
10	(United Kingdom) Jack Young	11	11	5^{6}	Ret	**2**^{1}	9	18†	13	17^{10}	3	Ret^{2}	3	8^{8}	12	205
11	(Spain) Isidro Callejas	18^{8}	7	Ret	10	8^{6}	3	9^{9}	4	**7**^{1}	10	Ret^{5}	11	5^{9}	DSQ	204
12	(Serbia) Dušan Borković	7^{4}	10	14	11	3^{3}	4	12	14	8	9	7^{6}	7	DNS	WD	192
13	(Slovakia) Maťo Homola	DNS	12	11	9	13	11	14^{3}	2	10	Ret	6^{9}	1	13	7	186
14	(Italy) Felice Jelmini	8^{9}	13	2^{3}	7	17	Ret	**3**^{1}	Ret	13	Ret	Ret^{3}	5	Ret	9	173
15	(Russia) Klim Gavrilov	Ret^{7}	4	13	15	9	Ret	11^{10}	12	6^{7}	6	15	16	11^{10}	1	164
16	(North Macedonia) Viktor Davidovski	13	18	8^{10}	4	11	10			18^{9}	13	9	26	12	19	95
17	(Czech Republic) Jáchym Galáš	16	16	12	Ret	DSQ	17	Ret	16	12^{8}	5	Ret	17	15	6	63
18	(Hungary) Dániel Nagy	3^{5}	5													60
19	(Slovakia) Martin Ryba	10	15	16	16	14	12	15	15	16	15	Ret	Ret	7^{5}	Ret	49
20	(Russia) Evgeni Leonov	9	17	10	12	15	Ret	17	Ret			13	15	16	17	38
21	(France) Sylvain Pussier	14	19	19	14	19	15	Ret	DNS	Ret	16	20	18	18	11	16
22	(France) Gilles Colombani	15	20	17	17	18	14	16	17	19	17	16	22	DNS	10	15
23	(Poland) Bartosz Groszek											11	13	WD	WD	14
24	(Spain) Rubén Fernández											12	Ret			7
25	(Venezuela) Sergio López Bolotin											Ret	20	20	13	5
26	(Italy) Damiano Reduzzi											14	21			3
27	(Spain) Felipe Fernández													Ret	14	3
28	(Denmark) Gustav Birch					20	16					17	23			0
29	(Poland) Łukasz Stolarczyk									20	18	18	25			0
30	(Italy) Giacomo Ghermandi													19	18	0
31	(Czech Republic) Petr Čížek											19	24	WD	WD	0
Pos.	Driver	SVK (Slovakia)		LEC (France)		ZAN (Netherlands)		SPA (Belgium)		NUR (Germany)		MNZ (Italy)		BAR (Spain)		Pts.

Colour	Result
Gold	Winner
Silver	Second place
Bronze	Third place
Green	Points classification
Blue	Non-points classification
Blue	Non-classified finish (NC)
Purple	Retired, not classified (Ret)
Red	Did not qualify (DNQ)
Red	Did not pre-qualify (DNPQ)
Black	Disqualified (DSQ)
White	Did not start (DNS)
White	Withdrew (WD)
White	Race cancelled (C)
Blank	Did not practice (DNP)
Blank	Did not arrive (DNA)
Blank	Excluded (EX)

**Bold** – Pole
Italics – Fastest Lap

† – Drivers did not finish the race, but were classified as they completed over 75% of the race distance.

==== Teams' standings ====
Pos.	Team	Pts.
1	(France) Sébastien Loeb Racing	759
2	(Belgium) Comtoyou Racing	605
3	(Spain) Volcano Motorsport	562
4	(France) Team Clairet Sport	542
5	(North Macedonia) PSS Racing Team	484
6	(Slovakia) Brutal Fish Racing Team	481
7	(Czech Republic) Janík Motorsport	295
8	(Russia) VRC Team	137
9	(Hungary) Zengő Motorsport	61
10	(Spain) RC2 Junior Team	26
11	(Slovakia) Horňák-Aditis	20
12	(Denmark) Brianmadsen Sport	10
13	(Italy) Trico WRT	5
14	(Slovenia) Lema Racing	4
=	(Poland) BTC Maszyny Racing	4

==== TCR BeNeLux Drivers' standings ====
Pos.	Driver	SVK (Slovakia)		LEC (France)		ZAN (Netherlands)		SPA (Belgium)		NUR (Germany)		MNZ (Italy)		BAR (Spain)		Pts.
Pos.	Driver	RD1	RD2	RD1	RD2	RD1	RD2	RD1	RD2	RD1	RD2	RD1	RD2	RD1	RD2	Pts.
1	(Belgium) Nicolas Baert	1^{3}	2	4^{3}	3	4^{3}	3	1^{3}	2	4^{4}	2	3^{2}	3	**1^{1}**	2	571
2	(Netherlands) Niels Langeveld	2^{4}	4†	**1^{1}**	Ret	3^{2}	1	2^{2}	1	**1^{1}**	1	4^{4}	4	2^{2}	1	561
3	(Netherlands) Tom Coronel	**3^{1}**	1	2^{2}	1	**1^{1}**	Ret	**3^{1}**	3	2^{2}	Ret	**1^{1}**	1	3^{3}	WD	504
4	(Serbia) Dušan Borković	4^{2}	3	3^{4}	2	2^{4}	2	4^{4}	4	3^{3}	3	2^{3}	2	DNS^{4}	WD	463
Pos.	Driver	SVK (Slovakia)		LEC (France)		ZAN (Netherlands)		SPA (Belgium)		NUR (Germany)		MNZ (Italy)		BAR (Spain)		Pts.
