= 2019 Formula Nordic =

Motor racing championship held in 2019

Seasons
- ← 2018 2020 →

The 2019 Formula Nordic season was the seventh season of the single-seater championship, and the first without the STCC branding following the series' promoter's bankruptcy. Instead, the series formed its own association, relaunching under the Formula Nordic brand but continuing to use the previous Formula Renault 1.6 chassis and engines, as it used to go under the name of Formula Renault 1.6 Nordic before Renault Sport dropped its support for the 3.5 and 1.6 classes in late 2015. The season began on 3 May at Ring Knutstorp and concluded on 5 October at Mantorp Park after eight rounds, Edward Sander Woldseth took the main (NEZ) title, with Viktor Andersson winning the junior (JSM) crown.

== Drivers and teams ==
Team	No.	Drivers	Rounds
(Norway) Team Greenpower	3	(Norway) Edward Sander Woldseth	All
(Norway) Team Greenpower	21	(Norway) Håvard Hallerud	All
(Norway) Team Greenpower	78	(Norway) Glenn Key	6, 8
(Norway) Team Greenpower	91	(Norway) Magnus Gustavsen	1–4
(Sweden) Trackstar Racing	10	(Sweden) Filip Larsson	5, 8
(Sweden) Winsth Racing	17	(Sweden) William Winsth	All
(Sweden) MA: GP	20	(Sweden) Viktor Andersson	All
Privateer	25	(Sweden) Gustav Brandin	5, 8
Privateer	74	(Sweden) Gabriel Nord	1–3, 5, 7–8
Privateer	101	(Sweden) Charlie Andersen	All

== Race calendar and results ==
The season started on 3 May at Ring Knutstorp and finished on 5 October at Mantorp Park after eight rounds, often supported by the Porsche Carrera Cup Scandinavia and the TCR Scandinavia, the successor to the STCC, as well as various GT series. This season was the first to use reversed grid races for the final race of the weekend, where the top 6 were inverted.

Round		Circuit	Date	Pole position	Fastest lap	Winning driver
1	R1	(Sweden) Ring Knutstorp, Kågeröd	3 May	(Sweden) Viktor Andersson	(Sweden) Viktor Andersson	(Norway) Edward Sander Woldseth
1	R2	(Sweden) Ring Knutstorp, Kågeröd	3 May		(Sweden) Viktor Andersson	(Sweden) Viktor Andersson
2	R1	(Norway) Rudskogen, Rakkestad	18 May	(Norway) Edward Sander Woldseth	(Sweden) William Winsth	(Norway) Edward Sander Woldseth
2	R2	(Norway) Rudskogen, Rakkestad	18 May		(Norway) Edward Sander Woldseth	(Sweden) William Winsth (Note: Gabriel Nord crossed the line in 1st but was given a 15 second time penalty due to an incident with Edward Sander Woldseth, and so Winsth was awarded the race win.)
3	R1	(Sweden) Anderstorp Raceway, Anderstorp	2 June	(Sweden) Viktor Andersson	(Sweden) Viktor Andersson	(Norway) Magnus Gustavsen
3	R2	(Sweden) Anderstorp Raceway, Anderstorp	2 June		(Sweden) Viktor Andersson	(Sweden) William Winsth
4	R1	(Sweden) Skellefteå Drivecenter Arena, Fällfors	14 June	(Norway) Edward Sander Woldseth	(Sweden) William Winsth	(Sweden) William Winsth
4	R2	(Sweden) Skellefteå Drivecenter Arena, Fällfors	15 June		(Norway) Edward Sander Woldseth	(Norway) Edward Sander Woldseth
4	R3	(Sweden) Skellefteå Drivecenter Arena, Fällfors	15 June		(Sweden) William Winsth	(Sweden) Viktor Andersson
5	R1	(Sweden) Gelleråsen Arena, Karlskoga	17 August	(Sweden) Viktor Andersson	(Norway) Edward Sander Woldseth	(Norway) Edward Sander Woldseth
5	R2	(Sweden) Gelleråsen Arena, Karlskoga	18 August		(Norway) Edward Sander Woldseth	(Norway) Edward Sander Woldseth
5	R3	(Sweden) Gelleråsen Arena, Karlskoga	18 August		(Sweden) William Winsth	(Sweden) Gabriel Nord
6	R1	(Norway) Rudskogen, Rakkestad	13 September	(Sweden) Viktor Andersson	(Sweden) Viktor Andersson	(Norway) Edward Sander Woldseth
6	R2	(Norway) Rudskogen, Rakkestad	14 September		(Sweden) Viktor Andersson	(Sweden) Viktor Andersson
6	R3	(Norway) Rudskogen, Rakkestad	14 September		(Norway) Edward Sander Woldseth	(Sweden) William Winsth
7	R1	(Sweden) Gelleråsen Arena, Karlskoga	28 September	(Norway) Edward Sander Woldseth	(Norway) Edward Sander Woldseth	(Norway) Edward Sander Woldseth
7	R2	(Sweden) Gelleråsen Arena, Karlskoga	28 September		(Norway) Håvard Hallerud	(Norway) Edward Sander Woldseth
7	R3	(Sweden) Gelleråsen Arena, Karlskoga	28 September		(Sweden) Viktor Andersson	(Sweden) Charlie Andersen
8	R1	(Sweden) Mantorp Park, Mantorp	4 October	(Sweden) Viktor Andersson	(Sweden) Viktor Andersson	(Sweden) Viktor Andersson
8	R2	(Sweden) Mantorp Park, Mantorp	5 October		(Norway) Edward Sander Woldseth	(Norway) Håvard Hallerud

== Championship standings ==
Qualifying points system

Points are awarded to the top 5 fastest qualifying times.

Position	**1st**	**2nd**	**3rd**	**4th**	**5th**
Points	5	4	3	2	1

Race points system

Points are awarded to the top 10 classified finishers.

Position	**1st**	**2nd**	**3rd**	**4th**	**5th**	**6th**	**7th**	**8th**	**9th**	**10th**
Points	25	18	15	12	10	8	6	4	2	1

Two championships are held, the Junior Svenskt Mästerskap (JSM) for drivers under 26 years old holding a Swedish driver license, and the Northern European Zone (NEZ) championship, the latter served as the overall championship, with the JSM points tally excluding round 2.

=== Formula Nordic Drivers' Championship (NEZ and JSM) ===
Pos	Driver	KNU (Sweden)		RUD1 (Norway)		AND (Sweden)		SKE (Sweden)			KAR1 (Sweden)			RUD2 (Norway)			KAR2 (Sweden)			MAN (Sweden)		Pts
1	(Norway) Edward Sander Woldseth	1	3	**1**	5	2	3	**Ret**	1	2	1	1	2	1	2	2	**1**	1	5	2	4	401
2	(Sweden) Viktor Andersson	**2**	1	3	3	**5**	2	2	3	1	**7**	5	6	**2**	1	3	3	2	3	**1**	3	361
3	(Sweden) William Winsth	3	2	2	1	Ret	1	1	5	3	3	Ret	4	3	6	1	5	6	2	5	7	297
4	(Norway) Håvard Hallerud	6	4	5	4	3	5	4	2	4	4	4	5	4	3	5	6	3	6	4	1	258
5	(Sweden) Charlie Andersen	7	6	6	7	4	6	3	DNS	DNS	2	2	3	5	4	4	4	4	1	Ret	5	218
6	(Sweden) Gabriel Nord	4	Ret	4	6	6	4				5	3	1				2	5	4	3	2	190
7	(Norway) Magnus Gustavsen	5	5	DNS	2	1	Ret	5	4	5												108
8	(Norway) Glenn Key													6	5	6				6	6	43
9	(Sweden) Filip Larsson										6	6	7							7	8	32
10	(Sweden) Gustav Brandin										Ret	7	8							8	9	16
Pos	Driver	KNU		RUD1		AND		SKE			KAR1			RUD2			KAR2			MAN		Pts

Colour	Result
Gold	Winner
Silver	Second place
Bronze	Third place
Green	Points classification
Blue	Non-points classification
Blue	Non-classified finish (NC)
Purple	Retired, not classified (Ret)
Red	Did not qualify (DNQ)
Red	Did not pre-qualify (DNPQ)
Black	Disqualified (DSQ)
White	Did not start (DNS)
White	Withdrew (WD)
White	Race cancelled (C)
Blank	Did not practice (DNP)
Blank	Did not arrive (DNA)
Blank	Excluded (EX)

**Bold** – Pole
Italics – Fastest Lap
