= Alessandro Famularo =

Venezuelan racing driver

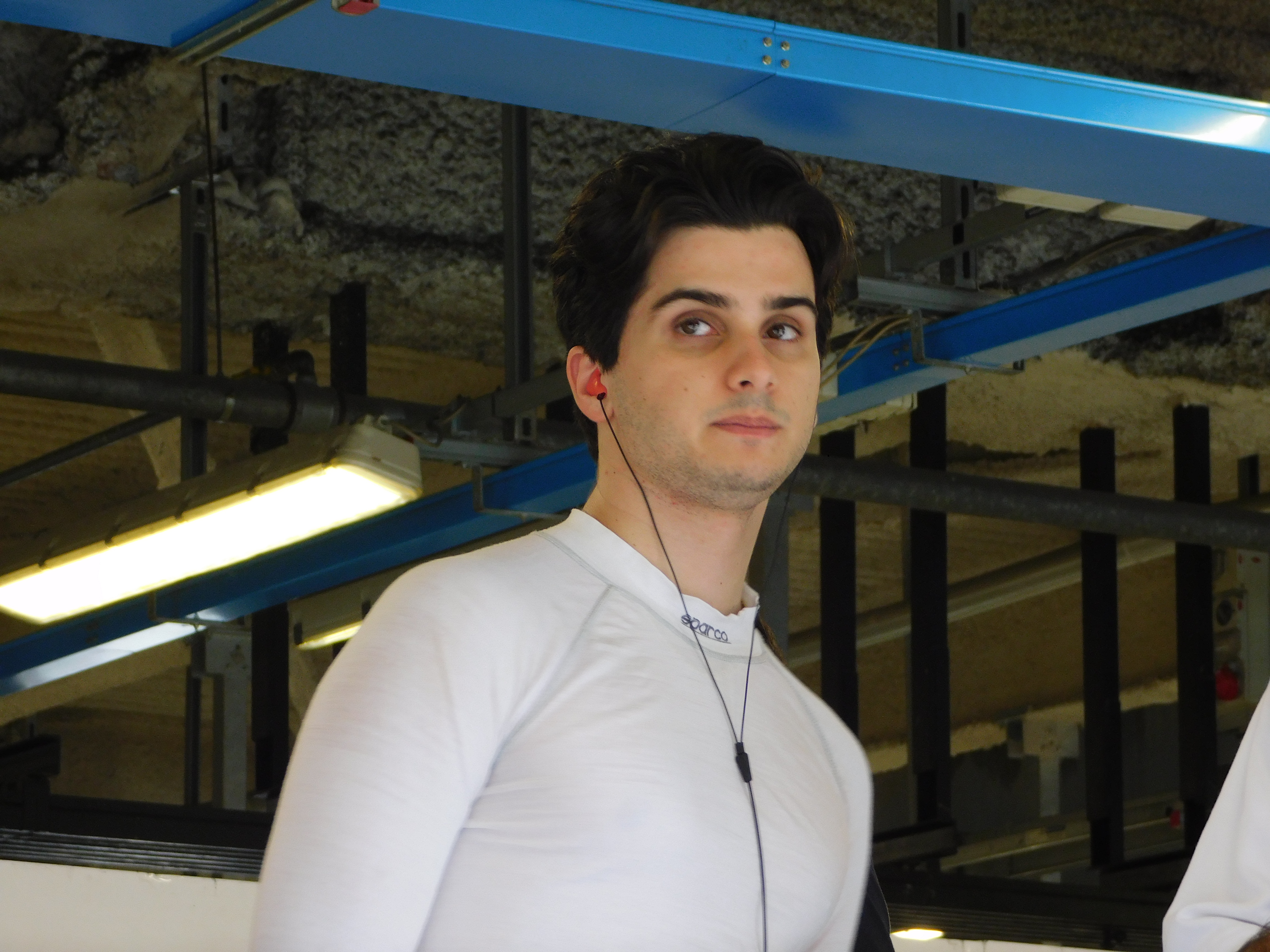
- Famularo at Monza in 2025
- Nationality: Venezuelan
- Born: 11 February 2003 (age 23) Caracas, Venezuela

FIA Formula 3 Championship career
- Debut season: 2022
- Former teams: Charouz Racing System
- Starts: 2 (2 entries)
- Wins: 0
- Podiums: 0
- Poles: 0
- Fastest laps: 0
- Best finish: 39th in 2022

Previous series
- 2020-2021 2019 2018–2019: FR European Championship; ADAC Formula 4 Italian F4 Championship

Alessandro Famularo (born 11 February 2003) is a Venezuelan racing driver who is currently competing in the 2025 Eurocup-3 season for Drivex. He previously competed in the 2022 FIA Formula 3 Championship for Charouz Racing System. He has previously raced in the Formula Regional European Championship for Van Amersfoort Racing and G4 Racing, and is an ADAC Formula 4 race winner.

Famularo is coached by Colombian former Formula One and NASCAR driver Juan Pablo Montoya.

== Personal life ==
Famularo was born on 11 February 2003 in the Venezuelan capital of Caracas. His twin brother Anthony is also a racing driver who last raced in the 2019 U.S. F2000 National Championship. They were teammates at Bhaitech in the 2018 Italian F4 Championship.

== Career ==
=== Karting ===
Famularo started karting in his native Venezuela at the age of four years old. He was a factory driver for the Birel ART team in 2017 and 2018.

=== Formula 4 ===
Famularo began his racing career in 2018, racing for Bhaitech in the Italian F4 Championship. He was a lower-midfield runner for most of the season, his only points finishes coming in the last two rounds at Vallelunga and Mugello.

In 2019 he switched to reigning teams' champions Prema Powerteam for a double program in Italian F4 and ADAC Formula 4. The move yielded better results for Famularo straightaway, as he scored a podium in the Italian F4 season opener at Vallelunga. He then went on to win at the Zandvoort ADAC F4 round in August, after a tyre gamble to start a wet race on slicks. Those were only two only podiums of the year, but regular points finishes in both series meant he finished 12th in Italian F4 and 15th in ADAC F4, of which he sat out the last three rounds.

=== Formula Regional ===
On 18 February 2020, it was announced that Famularo would make the step up to the Formula Regional European Championship with Van Amersfoort Racing. Having missed the opening two meetings through personal issues, he made his debut in the series at the Red Bull Ring in September. He left the championship after three rounds, in which he amassed 73 points and a best finish of fourth.

Famularo briefly returned to the series in 2021, as it merged with the Formula Renault Eurocup to form the Formula Regional European Championship by Alpine. He participated in three rounds for G4 Racing and scored no points.

=== FIA Formula 3 ===
==== 2020 ====
Famularo took part in FIA Formula 3 post-season testing at Barcelona and Jerez in October 2020, driving for Campos Racing.

==== 2022 ====
Famularo made his FIA Formula 3 debut with Charouz Racing System during the 2022 Monza season finale, replacing David Schumacher as the German was required to attend his DTM commitments. On his FIA F3 debut, where he finished both races in 23rd, Famularo stated that "[we] made a big step". Famularo ended the standings second to last in 39th.

Famularo remained with Charouz for that year's post-season test at Jerez, driving for the team on all three days.

=== Eurocup-3 ===
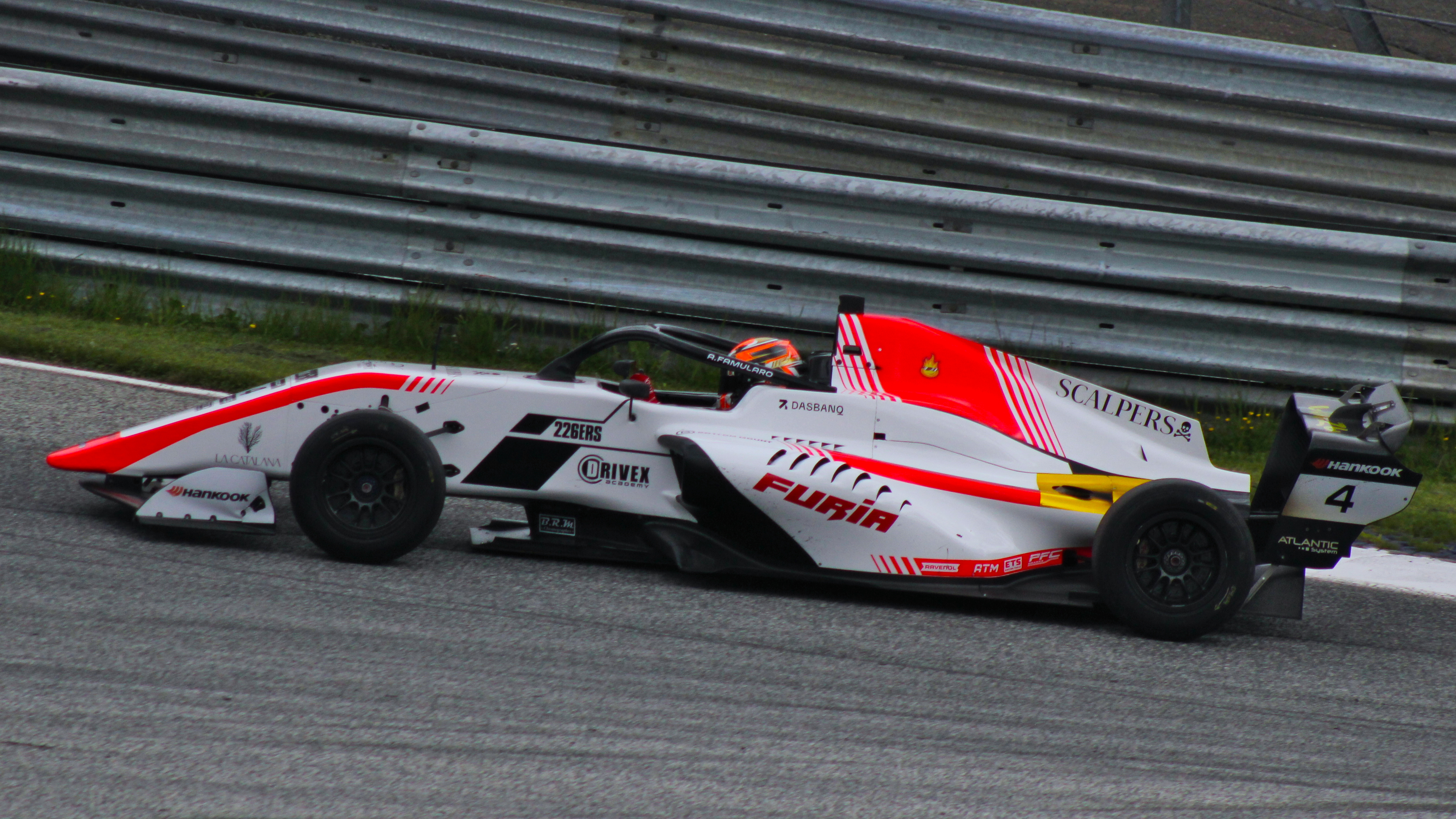
Famularo racing for Drivex in Eurocup-3 at the Red Bull Ring in 2025.

In May 2025, it was announced that Famularo would return to racing in Eurocup-3, competing for Drivex.

== Karting record ==
=== Karting career summary ===
Season	Series	Team	Position
2010	Easykart International Grand Finals - Easy 50	Easykart Venezuela	
2012	Florida Winter Tour - Micro Max		10th
2013	Florida Winter Tour - Vortex TaG Cadet		46th
2013	Florida Winter Tour - Micro Max		36th
2013	SKUSA SuperNationals XVII - TaG Cadet	AM Racing Engines	
2014	Florida Winter Tour - Micro Max	AM	9th
2014	SKUSA SuperNationals XVIII - TaG Cadet	AM Racing	
2015	SKUSA SuperNationals XIX - TaG Cadet	Team Benik Kart	30th
2016	WSK Champions Cup - Mini	Evokart	
2016	WSK Super Master Series - 60 Mini		25th
2016	CIK-FIA World Championship - OK Junior	Evokart Srl	
2017	WSK Super Master Series - OK Junior	Birel ART Racing	43rd
2017	CIK-FIA European Championship - OK Junior	Birel ART Racing	49th
2017	CIK-FIA World Championship - OK Junior	Birel ART Racing	13th
2017	WSK Champions Cup - OK Junior		25th
2017	ROK Cup International Final - Junior ROK	Babyrace Driver Academy	49th
2018	SKUSA SuperNationals XXII - X30 Senior	Team Montoya	46th
2020	SKUSA Winter Series - X30 Senior		

== Racing record ==
=== Racing career summary ===
Season	Series	Team	Races	Wins	Poles	F/Laps	Podiums	Points	Position
2018	Italian F4 Championship	Bhaitech	21	0	0	0	0	8	21st
2019	Italian F4 Championship	Prema Powerteam	21	0	0	0	1	54	12th
2019	ADAC Formula 4 Championship	Prema Powerteam	11	1	0	0	1	49	15th
2020	Formula Regional European Championship	Van Amersfoort Racing	9	0	0	0	0	73	11th
2021	Formula Regional European Championship	G4 Racing	5	0	0	0	0	0	32nd
2022	FIA Formula 3 Championship	Charouz Racing System	2	0	0	0	0	0	39th
2025	Eurocup-3	Drivex	12	0	0	0	0	0	30th
2025	Euroformula Open Championship	BVM Racing	9	0	0	0	0	66	9th
2026	Euroformula Open Championship	BVM Racing	24	2	0	1	6	227	4th

=== Complete Italian F4 Championship results ===
(key) (Races in bold indicate pole position) (Races in italics indicate fastest lap)

Year	Team	1	2	3	4	5	6	7	8	9	10	11	12	13	14	15	16	17	18	19	20	21	22	Pos	Points
2018	Bhaitech	ADR; 1 Ret	ADR; 2; 17	ADR; 3; 13	LEC; 1; 20	LEC; 2; 25	LEC; 3; 25	MNZ; 1; 22	MNZ; 2; 14	MNZ; 3; 13	MIS; 1; 17	MIS; 2; 19	MIS; 3; 14	IMO; 1; 13	IMO; 2; 26	IMO; 3 Ret	VLL; 1; 11	VLL; 2; 8	VLL; 3; 18	MUG; 1; 8	MUG; 2; 13	MUG; 3; 15		21st	8
2019	Prema Powerteam	VLL; 1; 3	VLL; 2 Ret	VLL; 3; 21	MIS; 1; 7	MIS; 2; 24	MIS; 3 C	HUN; 1; 20	HUN; 2 Ret	HUN; 3; 9	RBR; 1; 6	RBR; 2; 10	RBR; 3; 7	IMO; 1 Ret	IMO; 2; 9	IMO; 3; 8	IMO; 4; 8	MUG; 1; 8	MUG; 2; 16	MUG; 3; 12	MNZ; 1; 9	MNZ; 2; 13	MNZ; 3; 24	12th	54

=== Complete ADAC Formula 4 Championship results ===
(key) (Races in bold indicate pole position) (Races in italics indicate fastest lap)

Year	Team	1	2	3	4	5	6	7	8	9	10	11	12	13	14	15	16	17	18	19	20	Pos	Points
2019	Prema Powerteam	OSC; 1; 7	OSC; 2; 10	OSC; 3 Ret	RBR; 1; 4	RBR; 2; 11	RBR; 3 Ret	HOC; 1 Ret	HOC; 2 Ret	ZAN; 1; 1	ZAN; 2; 12	ZAN; 3; 8	NÜR; 1	NÜR; 2	NÜR; 3	HOC; 1	HOC; 2	HOC; 3	SAC; 1	SAC; 2	SAC; 3	15th	49

=== Complete Formula Regional European Championship results ===
(key) (Races in bold indicate pole position) (Races in italics indicate fastest lap)

Year	Team	1	2	3	4	5	6	7	8	9	10	11	12	13	14	15	16	17	18	19	20	21	22	23	24	DC	Points
2020	Van Amersfoort Racing	MIS; 1	MIS; 2	MIS; 3	LEC; 1	LEC; 2	LEC; 3	RBR; 1; 7	RBR; 2; 6	RBR; 3; 4	MUG; 1; 6	MUG; 2; 5	MUG; 3; 6	MNZ; 1; 5	MNZ; 2; 5	MNZ; 3; 10	CAT; 1	CAT; 2	CAT; 3	IMO; 1	IMO; 2	IMO; 3	VLL; 1	VLL; 2	VLL; 3	11th	73
2021	G4 Racing	IMO; 1	IMO; 2	CAT; 1 Ret	CAT; 2; 18	MCO; 1; 21	MCO; 2 DNQ	LEC; 1 Ret	LEC; 2; 18	ZAN; 1	ZAN; 2	SPA; 1	SPA; 2	RBR; 1	RBR; 2	VAL; 1	VAL; 2	MUG; 1	MUG; 2	MNZ; 1	MNZ; 2					32nd	0

=== Complete FIA Formula 3 Championship results ===
(key) (Races in bold indicate pole position; races in italics indicate points for the fastest lap of top ten finishers)

Year	Entrant	1	2	3	4	5	6	7	8	9	10	11	12	13	14	15	16	17	18	DC	Points
2022	Charouz Racing System	BHR; SPR	BHR; FEA	IMO; SPR	IMO; FEA	CAT; SPR	CAT; FEA	SIL; SPR	SIL; FEA	RBR; SPR	RBR; FEA	HUN; SPR	HUN; FEA	SPA; SPR	SPA; FEA	ZAN; SPR	ZAN; FEA	MNZ; SPR; 23	MNZ; FEA; 23	39th	0

=== Complete Eurocup-3 results ===
(key) (Races in bold indicate pole position) (Races in italics indicate fastest lap)

Year	Team	1	2	3	4	5	6	7	8	9	10	11	12	13	14	15	16	17	18	DC	Points
2025	Drivex	RBR; 1; 27	RBR; 2; 27	POR; 1; 14	POR; SR; 20	POR; 2; 20	LEC; 1; 17	LEC; SR; Ret	LEC; 2; 18	MNZ; 1; 22†	MNZ; 2; 19	ASS; 1; 23	ASS; 2; 16	SPA; 1	SPA; 2	JER; 1	JER; 2	CAT; 1	CAT; 2	30th	0

=== Complete Euroformula Open Championship results ===
(key) (Races in bold indicate pole position) (Races in italics indicate fastest lap)

Year	Entrant	1	2	3	4	5	6	7	8	9	10	11	12	13	14	15	16	17	18	19	20	21	22	23	24	DC	Points
2025	BVM Racing	PRT; 1	PRT; 2	PRT; 3	SPA; 1	SPA; 2	SPA; 3	HOC; 1	HOC; 2	HOC; 3	HUN; 1	HUN; 2	HUN; 3	LEC; 1	LEC; 2	LEC; 3	RBR; 1; 8	RBR; 2; 7	RBR; 3; 6	CAT; 1; 6	CAT; 2; 5	CAT; 3; 4	MNZ; 1; 5	MNZ; 2; 7	MNZ; 3; 8	9th	66
2026	BVM Racing	PRT; 1; 5	PRT; 2; 1	PRT; 3; 3	SPA; 1; 7	SPA; 2; 7	SPA; 3; 4	MIS; 1; 3	MIS; 2 (Ret)	MIS; 3; 5	HUN; 1; 3	HUN; 2; 6	HUN; 3; 5	LEC; 1; 10	LEC; 2; 8	LEC; 3 (Ret)	HOC; 1; 4	HOC; 2; 1	HOC; 3 DSQ	MNZ; 1; 3	MNZ; 2 (Ret)	MNZ; 3; 4	CAT; 1; 7	CAT; 2; 4	CAT; 3; 7	4th	227

* Season still in progress.
