= 2025 TCR Italy Touring Car Championship =

Touring car season

The 2025 TCR Italy Touring Car Championship was the tenth season of the ITCC to run under TCR regulations and the 39th season since the national touring car series was revived in 1987 as the Campionato Italiano Turismo.

Nicolas Taylor was the defending series' champion.

== Calendar ==
Race is part of TCR World Tour

| Rnd. | Circuit | Location | Date |
|---|---|---|---|
| 1 | (Emilia-Romagna) Misano World Circuit | Misano Adriatico, Emilia-Romagna | 2–4 May |
| 2 | (Rome) Vallelunga Circuit | Campagnano di Roma, Lazio | 23–25 May |
| 3 | (Lombardy) Autodromo Nazionale di Monza | Monza, Lombardy | 20–22 June |
| 4 | (Emilia-Romagna) Autodromo Enzo e Dino Ferrari | Imola, Emilia-Romagna | 1–3 August |
| 5 | (Tuscany) Autodromo Internazionale del Mugello | Scarperia e San Piero, Tuscany | 12–14 September |
| 6 | (Emilia-Romagna) Misano World Circuit | Misano Adriatico, Emilia-Romagna | 10–12 October |

=== Calendar changes ===
- The round at Pergusa was removed from the schedule.
- Second round at Misano was added to replace Pergusa. It also replaced Monza as the final round of the season.
- The 3rd round at Monza ran alongside the TCR World Tour round, but in separate races.

== Teams and drivers ==
| Team | Car | No. | Drivers | Class | Rounds | Ref. |
|---|---|---|---|---|---|---|
| (Italy) PMA Motorsport | Audi RS 3 LMS TCR (2021) | 1 | (Canada) Nicolas Taylor | | All | |
| (Italy) PMA Motorsport | Audi RS 3 LMS TCR (2021) | 72 | (Italy) Sandro Pelatti | | All | |
| (Italy) MM Motorsport | Honda Civic Type R TCR (FL5) | 3 | (Poland) Giacomo Chermandi | | 6 | |
| (Italy) MM Motorsport | Honda Civic Type R TCR (FL5) | 36 | (Poland) Michał Bartoszuk | | All | |
| (Italy) MM Motorsport | Honda Civic Type R TCR (FL5) | 67 | (Italy) Marco Pellegrini | | All | |
| (Italy) MM Motorsport | Honda Civic Type R TCR (FL5) | 82 | (Italy) Jacopo Cimenes | | 1–4 | |
| (Italy) Aikoa Racing | Audi RS 3 LMS TCR (2021) | 8 | (Italy) Nicola Baldan | | All | |
| (Italy) Aikoa Racing | Audi RS 3 LMS TCR (2021) | 11 | (Italy) Giacomo Prandelli | | 6 | |
| (Italy) Aikoa Racing | Audi RS 3 LMS TCR (2021) | 17 | (Italy) Francesco Cardone | | All | |
| (Italy) Aikoa Racing | Audi RS 3 LMS TCR (2021) | 80 | (Italy) Filippo Barberi | | All | |
| (Italy) Gear Works | Audi RS 3 LMS TCR (2021) | 9 | (Italy) Matteo Poloni | | All | |
| (Italy) RC Motorsport | Audi RS 3 LMS TCR (2021) | 10 | (Italy) Paolino Federico | | 3 | |
| (Italy) BRC Hyundai N Squadra Corse | Hyundai Elantra N TCR | 12 | (Italy) Gabriele Covini | | All | |
| (Italy) BRC Hyundai N Squadra Corse | Hyundai Elantra N TCR | 76 | (United Kingdom) Alex Ley | | All | |
| (Italy) BF Racing | Audi RS 3 LMS TCR (2021) | 18 | (Italy) Carlo Alboreto Bocca | | All | |
| (Italy) BF Racing | Audi RS 3 LMS TCR (2021) | 95 | (Italy) Pietro Alessi | | All | |
| (Germany) Schafer Motorsport | Volkswagen Golf GTI TCR | 22 | (Germany) Stefan Schafer | | 1, 4–6 | |
| (Italy) Target Competition | Hyundai Elantra N TCR | 24 | (Switzerland) Antonio Citera | | 6 | |
| (Turkey) Texaco Team AMS | Audi RS 3 LMS TCR (2021) | 28 | (Turkey) Zekai Özen | | 1–3 | |
| (Italy) NOS Racing | Cupra León VZ TCR | 30 | (Italy) Cosimo Barberini | | 4–6 | |
| (Italy) Progetto E20 Brothers in Arms | Audi RS 3 LMS TCR (2021) | 33 | (Italy) Gabriele Giorgi | | 5 | |
| (Italy) Kombat Motorsport | Hyundai Elantra N TCR | 44 | (Italy) Michele Imberti | | 1–3, 5–6 | |
| (Italy) Fox Racing Team | Audi RS 3 LMS TCR (2021) | 55 | (Italy) Filippo Maria Zanin | | 1–5 | |
| (Italy) Fox Racing Team | Cupra León VZ TCR | 69 | (Italy) Tommaso Fossati | | 1, 3 | |
| (Albania) Trico WRT | Hyundai Elantra N TCR | 81 | (Italy) Damiano Reduzzi | | 1–2, 5 | |
| (Italy) Planet Motorsport | Audi RS 3 LMS TCR (2021) | 90 | (Italy) Denis Babuin | | All | |

| Icon | Class |
|---|---|
| U25 | Eligible for TCR Italy Under 25 Trophy |
| M | Eligible for TCR Italy Master Trophy |
| W | TCR World Tour entries not eligible to score points in the local series |

=== TCR Italy DSG ===
| Team | Car | No. | Drivers | Rounds | Ref. |
|---|---|---|---|---|---|
| (Italy) Aikoa Racing | Audi RS 3 LMS TCR (2017) | 101 | (Italy) Giacomo Prandelli | 3–5 | |
| (Italy) Aikoa Racing | Audi RS 3 LMS TCR (2017) | 127 | (Italy) Andrea Palazzo | All | |
| (Italy) Autoparking Carpegna | Cupra León TCR | 102 | (Italy) Giorgio Fantilli | 1–5 | |
| (Italy) RPM Performance Motorsport | Cupra León TCR | 111 | (Italy) Matteo Roccadelli | All | |
| (Italy) Andrea Argenti | Audi RS 3 LMS TCR (2017) | 112 | (Italy) Andrea Argenti | 3 | |
| (Italy) Casals Motorsport | Audi RS 3 LMS TCR (2017) | 116 | (Italy) Gustavo Sandrucci | All | |
| (Italy) Casals Motorsport | Audi RS 3 LMS TCR (2017) | 165 | (Italy) Sebastian Gavazza | All | |
| (Italy) Cipierre Racing Team | Cupra León TCR | 118 | (Italy) Federico Antonelli | 1, 4–6 | |
| (Italy) Paolo Palanti | Cupra León TCR | 119 | (Italy) Paolo Palanti | All | |
| (Italy) Progetto E20 / Brothers in Arms | Cupra León TCR | 124 | (Italy) "Micio" | 1–2 | |
| (Italy) Progetto E20 / Brothers in Arms | Cupra León TCR | 161 | (Italy) Francesco Miotto-Fazioli | 1–5 | |
| (Italy) Progetto E20 / Brothers in Arms | Cupra León TCR | 161 | (Italy) Andrea Fazioli | 1–3 | |
| (Italy) Progetto E20 / Brothers in Arms | Cupra León TCR | 169 | (Italy) Francesco Savoia | 1–3 | |
| (Italy) Progetto E20 / Brothers in Arms | Audi RS 3 LMS TCR (2017) | 131 | (Italy) Paolo Maria Silvestrini | All | |
| (Italy) Progetto E20 / Brothers in Arms | Audi RS 3 LMS TCR (2017) | 133 | (Italy) Gabriele Giorgi | 1–2 | |
| (Turkey) Texaco Team AMS | Audi RS 3 LMS TCR (2017) | 138 | (Turkey) Seda Kaçan | 1–3 | |
| (Italy) Faro Racing | Volkswagen Golf GTI TCR | 142 | (Italy) Emanuele Romani | 4–5 | |
| (Italy) RC Motorsport | Cupra León TCR | 143 | (Italy) Riccardo Romagnoli | 1–3 | |
| (Italy) RC Motorsport | Audi RS 3 LMS TCR (2017) | 192 | (Italy) Carlotta Fedeli | 1–3 | |
| (Italy) SF Squadra Corse by SC Motorsport | Cupra León TCR | 144; 180 | (Italy) Federico Danova | 1–2, 6 | |
| (Italy) SF Squadra Corse by SC Motorsport | Cupra León TCR | 168 | (Italy) Eric Brigliadori | All | |
| (Italy) Planet Motorsport | Audi RS 3 LMS TCR (2017) | 144 | (Italy) Gabriele Miotto | 5 | |
| (Italy) Planet Motorsport | Audi RS 3 LMS TCR (2017) | 184 | (Italy) Mattia Lancellotti | 1–5 | |
| (Italy) Planet Motorsport | Cupra León TCR | 178 | (Italy) Alessandro Berton | 1–4 | |
| (Italy) Tuder Motorsport | Audi RS 3 LMS TCR (2017) | 179 | (Italy) Luca Giavannoni | 6 | |

== Results ==
| Rnd. | | Circuit | Date | Pole position | Fastest lap | Winning driver | Winning team | Winning U25 driver | Winning Master driver | DSG Winning Driver | DSG Winning Team |
|---|---|---|---|---|---|---|---|---|---|---|---|
| 1 | 1 | Misano World Circuit Marco Simoncelli, Misano Adriatico | 2–4 May | (Canada) Nicolas Taylor | (Canada) Nicolas Taylor | (Canada) Nicolas Taylor | (Italy) PMA Motorsport | (Canada) Nicolas Taylor | (Italy) Denis Babuin | (Italy) Eric Brigliadori | (Italy) SF Squadra Corse by SC Motorsport |
| 1 | 2 | Misano World Circuit Marco Simoncelli, Misano Adriatico | 2–4 May | | (Italy) Michele Imberti | (Italy) Nicola Baldan | (Italy) Aikoa Racing | (Italy) Pietro Alessi | (Italy) Denis Babuin | (Italy) Eric Brigliadori | (Italy) SF Squadra Corse by SC Motorsport |
| 2 | 3 | Vallelunga Circuit, Campagnano di Roma | 23–25 May | (Italy) Jacopo Cimenes | (Italy) Nicola Baldan | (Canada) Nicolas Taylor | (Italy) PMA Motorsport | (Canada) Nicolas Taylor | (Italy) Denis Babuin | (Italy) Matteo Roccadelli | (Italy) RPM Performance Motorsport |
| 2 | 4 | Vallelunga Circuit, Campagnano di Roma | 23–25 May | | (United Kingdom) Alex Ley | (United Kingdom) Alex Ley | (Italy) BRC Hyundai N Squadra Corse | (United Kingdom) Alex Ley | (Italy) Denis Babuin | (Italy) Gustavo Sandrucci | (Italy) Casals Motorsport |
| 3 | 5 | Autodromo Nazionale di Monza, Monza | 20–22 June | (Italy) Nicola Baldan | (Canada) Nicolas Taylor | (Italy) Matteo Poloni | (Italy) Gear Works | (Italy) Pietro Alessi | (Italy) Francesco Cardone | (Italy) Eric Brigliadori | (Italy) SF Squadra Corse by SC Motorsport |
| 3 | 6 | Autodromo Nazionale di Monza, Monza | 20–22 June | | (Italy) Pietro Alessi | (Italy) Nicola Baldan | (Italy) Aikoa Racing | (Poland) Michal Bartoszuk | (Italy) Francesco Cardone | (Italy) Eric Brigliadori | (Italy) SF Squadra Corse by SC Motorsport |
| 4 | 7 | Autodromo Enzo e Dino Ferrari, Imola | 1–3 August | (Italy) Gabriele Covini | (United Kingdom) Alex Ley | (United Kingdom) Alex Ley | (Italy) BRC Hyundai N Squadra Corse | (United Kingdom) Alex Ley | (Italy) Denis Babuin | (Italy) Eric Brigliadori | (Italy) SF Squadra Corse by SC Motorsport |
| 4 | 8 | Autodromo Enzo e Dino Ferrari, Imola | 1–3 August | | (Canada) Nicolas Taylor | (Canada) Nicolas Taylor | (Italy) PMA Motorsport | (Canada) Nicolas Taylor | (Italy) Denis Babuin | (Italy) Matteo Roccadelli | (Italy) SF Squadra Corse by SC Motorsport |
| 5 | 9 | Mugello Circuit, Scarperia | 12–14 September | (Italy) Michele Imberti | (Italy) Michele Imberti | (Italy) Michele Imberti | (Italy) Kombat Motorsport | (United Kingdom) Alex Ley | (Italy) Sandro Pelatti | (Italy) Eric Brigliadori | (Italy) SF Squadra Corse by SC Motorsport |
| 5 | 10 | Mugello Circuit, Scarperia | 12–14 September | | (Poland) Michał Bartoszuk | (Canada) Nicolas Taylor | (Italy) PMA Motorsport | (Canada) Nicolas Taylor | (Italy) Damiano Reduzzi | (Italy) Mattia Lancellotti | (Italy) Planet Motorsport |
| 6 | 11 | Misano World Circuit, Misano Adriatico | 10–12 October | (Italy) Gabriele Covini | (Italy) Michele Imberti | (Italy) Michele Imberti | (Italy) Kombat Motorsport | (Canada) Nicolas Taylor | (Italy) Denis Babuin | (Italy) Matteo Roccadelli | (Italy) SF Squadra Corse by SC Motorsport |
| 6 | 12 | Misano World Circuit, Misano Adriatico | 10–12 October | | (Canada) Nicolas Taylor | (Canada) Nicolas Taylor | (Italy) PMA Motorsport | (Canada) Nicolas Taylor | (Italy) Marco Pellegrini | (Italy) Gustavo Sandrucci | (Italy) Casals Motorsport |

== Standings ==
Scoring system

| Position | 1st | 2nd | 3rd | 4th | 5th | 6th | 7th | 8th | 9th | 10th | 11th | 12th | 13th | 14th | 15th |
| Qualifying | 15 | 14 | 13 | 12 | 11 | 10 | 9 | 8 | 7 | 6 | 5 | 4 | 3 | 2 | 1 |
| Races | 40 | 35 | 30 | 27 | 24 | 21 | 18 | 15 | 13 | 11 | 9 | 7 | 5 | 3 | 1 |

=== Drivers' championship ===
==== Overall ====
| Pos. | Driver | MIS1 | | VAL | | MON | | IMO | | MUG | | MIS2 | | Pts. |
|---|---|---|---|---|---|---|---|---|---|---|---|---|---|---|
| 1 | (Canada) Nicolas Taylor | 1 | 5 | 1 | 3 | 3 | Ret | 2 | 1 | 5 | 1 | 2 | 1 | 425 |
| 2 | (Italy) Nicola Baldan | 4 | 1 | 2 | 2 | 7 | 1 | 7 | 2 | 3 | 3 | 3 | 3 | 396 |
| 3 | (United Kingdom) Alex Ley | 18 | 7 | 6 | 1 | 18 | 4 | 1 | 6 | 2 | 4 | 8 | 2 | 343 |
| 4 | (Italy) Pietro Alessi | 3 | 3 | 3 | 6 | 2 | 12 | 4 | 10 | 4 | 11 | 4 | 4 | 315 |
| 5 | (Italy) Matteo Poloni | 2 | 6 | 4 | 10 | 1 | 13 | 3 | 4 | Ret | 2 | 6 | Ret | 314 |
| 6 | (Italy) Michele Imberti | 5 | 2 | Ret | 16 | 16 | Ret | | | 1 | 5 | 1 | 14 | 223 |
| 7 | (Italy) Gabriele Covini | 10 | 8 | 15 | 4 | 11 | 16 | 9 | 7 | 6 | 6 | 16 | 9 | 213 |
| 8 | (Italy) Denis Babuin | 6 | 4 | 5 | 8 | Ret | 14 | 10 | 3 | Ret | 13 | 9 | 7 | 201 |
| 9 | (Italy) Filippo Barberi | 16 | 19 | 7 | 7 | 14 | 5 | 16 | Ret | 7 | 12 | 5 | Ret | 143 |
| 10 | (Italy) Marco Pellegrini | 19 | 11 | 12 | Ret | 9 | 11 | 11 | 9 | 9 | 19 | 10 | 5 | 140 |
| 11 | (Italy) Filippo Maria Zanin | 7 | 14 | 9 | 9 | 6 | 8 | 8 | Ret | 11 | 14 | | | 126 |
| 12 | (Poland) Michal Bartoszuk | 12 | 13 | 16 | 15 | 13 | 3 | 6 | Ret | 12 | 7 | Ret | Ret | 115 |
| 12 | (Italy) Carlo Alberto Bocca | 9 | 12 | 10 | Ret | 8 | 10 | 12 | 12 | 16 | 16 | 17 | 6 | 115 |
| 14 | (Italy) Sandro Pelatti | 11 | Ret | 13 | 13 | 17 | 7 | 15 | 11 | 8 | 10 | 11 | 10 | 108 |
| 15 | (Italy) Francesco Cardone | 17 | 17 | 11 | 11 | 5 | 2 | 13 | Ret | Ret | 17 | 12 | 11 | 107 |
Not classified (Note: Under Article 25 of the Regulations, in order to participate in the final rankings of the Championship, each driver must have carried out at least five events.)
| - | (Italy) Jacopo Cimenes | 8 | 9 | Ret | 5 | 4 | 15 | 5 | 8 | | | | | 165 |
| - | (Italy) Cosimo Barberini | | | | | | | Ret | 5 | 14 | 8 | 7 | 8 | 115 |
| - | (Italy) Damiano Reduzzi | 20 | 10 | 8 | 12 | | | | | 10 | 9 | | | 70 |
| - | (Turkey) Özen Zekai | 14 | 16 | 14 | 14 | 10 | 6 | | | | | | | 47 |
| - | (Italy) Tommaso Fossati | 13 | 15 | | | 12 | 9 | | | | | | | 26 |
| - | (Germany) Stefan Schafer | 15 | 18 | | | | | 14 | 13 | 15 | 18 | 15 | 13 | 16 |
| - | (Switzerland) Antonio Citera | | | | | | | | | | | 14 | 12 | 10 |
| - | (Italy) Gabriele Giorgi | | | | | | | | | 13 | 15 | | | 6 |
| - | (Italy) Giacomo Prandelli | | | | | | | | | | | 13 | Ret | 5 |
| - | (Italy) Giacomo Ghermandi | | | | | | | | | | | Ret | Ret | 2 |
| - | (Italy) Federico Paolino | | | | | 15 | Ret | | | | | | | 1 |
| Pos. | Driver | MIS1 | | VAL | | MON | | IMO | | MUG | | MIS2 | | Pts. |

| Colour | Result |
|---|---|
| Gold | Winner |
| Silver | Second place |
| Bronze | Third place |
| Green | Points classification |
| Blue | Non-points classification |
| Blue | Non-classified finish (NC) |
| Purple | Retired, not classified (Ret) |
| Red | Did not qualify (DNQ) |
| Red | Did not pre-qualify (DNPQ) |
| Black | Disqualified (DSQ) |
| White | Did not start (DNS) |
| White | Withdrew (WD) |
| White | Race cancelled (C) |
| Blank | Did not practice (DNP) |
| Blank | Did not arrive (DNA) |
| Blank | Excluded (EX) |

† – Drivers did not finish the race, but were classified.

==== TCR Italy DSG ====
| Pos. | Driver | MIS1 | VAL | MON | IMO | MUG | MIS2 | Pts. |
| Pos. | Driver | MIS1 | VAL | MON | IMO | MUG | MIS2 | Pts. |
