= Nicolas Taylor (racing driver) =

Canadian racing driver (born 2005)

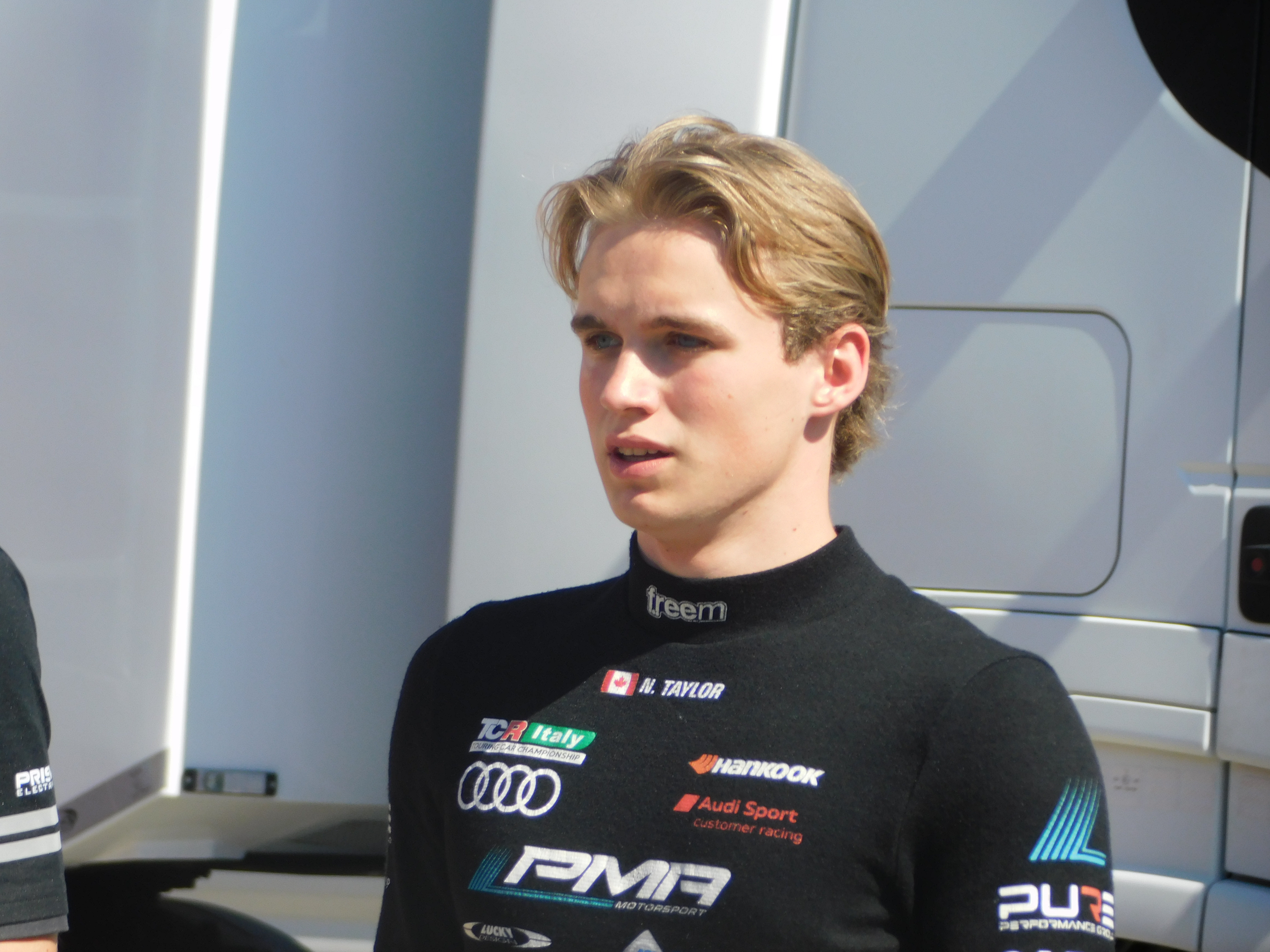
- Taylor in 2025
- Nationality: (Canada) Canadian
- Born: 8 October 2005 (age 21) Calgary, Alberta, Canada

Championship titles
- 2024–2025: TCR Italy Touring Car Championship

Nicolas Taylor (born 8 October 2005 in Calgary) is a Canadian racing driver. He is a two-time TCR Italy champion.

== Career ==
Taylor started karting in Canada, before moving to Malta to compete in mainly Italian-based championships as a factory driver for GP Racing. Racing full-time in karts until 2023, Taylor most notably won the 2023 Rok Cup Italy in the Shifter class.

On December 14, 2023, it was announced that Taylor would join PMA Motorsport for the 2024 TCR Italy Touring Car Championship. After qualifying second on debut at Misano, Taylor repeated the same feat in the following round at Pergusa, where he also scored his maiden podium and Under 25 win in race one. Standing on the podium at Mugello and taking another top-five at Imola, Taylor took his maiden pole at the penultimate round at Vallelunga, which he converted into his maiden win in the series. In the season finale at Monza, Taylor won race one from pole and by finishing seventh in race two took the TCR Italy title over Ruben Volt on countback.

Taylor remained with PMA Motorsport in 2025, competing in both the Italian and European TCR championships on a full-time basis. In Italy, Taylor began the year by winning at Misano and Vallelunga, before taking further wins at Imola, Mugello and Misano to secure his second consecutive TCR Italy title. In Europe, Taylor scored a lone podium at the Red Bull Ring by finishing second in race one, as he ended the year 12th in points. The following year, Taylor continued with PMA for his second full-time season in TCR Europe, as well as racing for part-time the team in Porsche Carrera Cup Italy alongside his brother Zachary. In TCR Europe, Taylor took wins at Mugello and the Le Castellet, en route to third in points with two additional podiums to his name.

== Personal life ==
Taylor lives in Malta, having moved there during his karting career. Taylor has one brother, Zachary, who is also a racing driver.

== Karting record ==
=== Karting career summary ===
| Season | Series | Team | Position |
|---|---|---|---|
| 2021 | SKUSA SuperNationals - X30 Senior | Aluminos | NC |
| 2022 | WSK Champions Cup - OK | GP Racing Srl | 16th |
| 2022 | Andrea Margutti Trophy - X30 Senior | GP Racing Srl | NC |
| 2022 | Karting European Championship - KZ2 | GP Racing Srl | NC |
| 2022 | Trofeo Delle Industrie - KZ2 | GP Racing Srl | NC |
| 2022 | Karting World Cup - KZ2 | GP Racing Srl | NC |
| 2022 | Italian Karting Championship - KZ2 | | 39th |
| 2022 | SKUSA SuperNationals - Pro Shifter | | NC |
| 2023 | WSK Champions Cup - KZ2 | GP Racing Srl | 24th |
| 2023 | WSK Super Master Series - KZ2 | GP Racing Srl | 44th |
| 2023 | WSK Open Series - KZ2 | GP Racing Srl | 20th |
| 2023 | ROK Superfinal - Shifter Rok | | 34th |
| 2023 | SKUSA SuperNationals - Pro Shifter | | 20th |
| 2024 | SKUSA SuperNationals - Pro Shifter | | 17th |

== Racing record ==
=== Racing career summary ===
| Season | Series | Team | Races | Wins | Poles | F/Laps | Podiums | Points | Position |
|---|---|---|---|---|---|---|---|---|---|
| 2024 | TCR Italy Touring Car Championship | PMA Motorsport | 12 | 2 | 2 | 3 | 4 | 352 | **1st** |
| 2024 | TCR Europe Touring Car Series | PMA Motorsport | 2 | 0 | 0 | 0 | 0 | 31 | 15th |
| 2024 | TCR Spain | PMA Motorsport | 4 | 0 | 0 | 0 | 0 | 66 | 11th |
| 2025 | TCR Europe Touring Car Series | PMA Motorsport | 12 | 0 | 0 | 0 | 1 | 117 | 12th |
| 2025 | TCR Italy Touring Car Championship | PMA Motorsport | 12 | 5 | 1 | 5 | 9 | 425 | **1st** |
| 2026 | TCR Europe Touring Car Series | PMA Motorsport | 12 | 2 | 0 | 0 | 4 | 187 | **3rd** |
| 2026 | TCR Europe Cup | PMA Motorsport | 1 | 0 | 0 | 0 | 0 | 12 | 12th |
| 2026 | Porsche Carrera Cup Italy | PMA Motorsport | 2 | 0 | 0 | 0 | 0 | 9 | 23rd |

=== Complete TCR Italy Touring Car Championship results ===
(key) (Races in bold indicate pole position) (Races in italics indicate fastest lap)

| Year | Team | Car | 1 | 2 | 3 | 4 | 5 | 6 | 7 | 8 | 9 | 10 | 11 | 12 | DC | Points |
|---|---|---|---|---|---|---|---|---|---|---|---|---|---|---|---|---|
| 2024 | PMA Motorsport | Audi RS 3 LMS TCR (2021) | MIS; 1; 6^{2} | MIS; 2; 13 | PER; 1; 2^{2} | PER; 2; 4 | MUG; 1 Ret^{5} | MUG; 2; 3 | IMO; 1; 5^{4} | IMO; 2; 7 | **VAL**; **1**; 1^{1} | VAL; 2; 7 | **MNZ**; **1**; 1^{1} | MNZ; 2; 7 | 1st | 352 |
| 2025 | PMA Motorsport | Audi RS 3 LMS TCR (2021) | **MIS1**; **1**; 1^{1} | MIS1; 2; 5 | VAL; 1; 1^{3} | VAL; 2; 3 | MNZ; 1; 3^{5} | MNZ; 2 Ret | IMO; 1; 2^{6} | IMO; 2; 1 | MUG; 1; 5^{6} | MUG; 2; 1 | MIS2; 1; 2^{4} | MIS2; 2; 1 | 1st | 425 |

=== Complete TCR Europe Touring Car Series results ===
(key) (Races in bold indicate pole position) (Races in italics indicate fastest lap)

| Year | Team | Car | 1 | 2 | 3 | 4 | 5 | 6 | 7 | 8 | 9 | 10 | 11 | 12 | DC | Points |
|---|---|---|---|---|---|---|---|---|---|---|---|---|---|---|---|---|
| 2024 | PMA Motorsport | Audi RS 3 LMS TCR (2021) | VAL; 1 | VAL; 2 | ZOL; 1 | ZOL; 2 | SAL; 1 | SAL; 2 | SPA; 1 | SPA; 2 | BRN; 1 | BRN; 2 | CRT; 1; 9 | CRT; 2; 7 | 15th | 31 |
| 2025 | PMA Motorsport | Audi RS 3 LMS TCR (2021) | PRT; 1; 4 | PRT; 2; 18 | SPA; 1; 6 | SPA; 2; 9 | HOC; 1; 13^{6} | HOC; 2 Ret | MIS; 1; 12 | MIS; 2; 11 | RBR; 1; 2^{2} | RBR; 2; 4 | CAT; 1 Ret | CAT; 2; 20 | 12th | 117 |
| 2026 | PMA Motorsport | Audi RS 3 LMS TCR (2021) | MUG; 1; 8 | MUG; 2; 1 | SPA; 1; 5^{5} | SPA; 2; 2 | LEC; 1; 5 | LEC; 2; 1 | HUN; 1; 8 | HUN; 2 Ret | MNZ; 1; 14^{3} | MNZ; 2 Ret | CAT; 1; 9 | CAT; 2; 3 | 3rd | 187 |

^{†} Taylor did not finish, but was classified as he completed over 75% of the race distance.
