= 2026 TCR Europe Touring Car Series =

European motorsport championship

The 2026 TCR Europe Touring Car Series was the tenth season of TCR Europe Touring Car Series. The season began at Mugello Circuit on 20 March and ended at Circuit de Barcelona-Catalunya on 25 October.

== Main Series ==
=== Calendar ===
The calendar was announced on 22 September 2025 with 6 rounds scheduled.

Rnd.		Circuit/Location	Date	Supporting
1	1	(Italy) Mugello Circuit, Scarperia e San Piero	20–22 March	24H Series; Prototype Cup Europe; Radical Cup Europe
1	2	(Italy) Mugello Circuit, Scarperia e San Piero	20–22 March	24H Series; Prototype Cup Europe; Radical Cup Europe
2	3	(Belgium) Circuit de Spa-Francorchamps, Stavelot	15–17 May	International GT Open; Euroformula Open Championship; GT Cup Open Europe; Porsche Carrera Cup Germany
2	4	(Belgium) Circuit de Spa-Francorchamps, Stavelot	15–17 May	International GT Open; Euroformula Open Championship; GT Cup Open Europe; Porsche Carrera Cup Germany
3	5	(France) Circuit Paul Ricard, Le Castellet	5–7 June	24H Series; Radical Cup Europe
3	6	(France) Circuit Paul Ricard, Le Castellet	5–7 June	24H Series; Radical Cup Europe
4	7	(Hungary) Hungaroring, Budapest	3–5 July	International GT Open; Formula Regional European Championship; Euroformula Open Championship
4	8	(Hungary) Hungaroring, Budapest	3–5 July	International GT Open; Formula Regional European Championship; Euroformula Open Championship
5	9	(Italy) Autodromo Nazionale Monza, Monza	25–27 September	International GT Open; Euroformula Open Championship
5	10	(Italy) Autodromo Nazionale Monza, Monza	25–27 September	International GT Open; Euroformula Open Championship
6	11	(Spain) Circuit de Barcelona-Catalunya, Montmeló	23–25 October	International GT Open; Euroformula Open Championship; GT Cup Open Europe
6	12	(Spain) Circuit de Barcelona-Catalunya, Montmeló	23–25 October	International GT Open; Euroformula Open Championship; GT Cup Open Europe

=== Teams and drivers ===
Team	Car	No.	Drivers	Class	Rounds
(Estonia) ALM Motorsport	Honda Civic Type R TCR (FL5)	7	(Germany) Mike Halder		All
(Estonia) ALM Motorsport	Honda Civic Type R TCR (FL5)	27	(Estonia) Ruben Volt	U	All
(Estonia) ALM Motorsport	Honda Civic Type R TCR (FL5)	41	(United Kingdom) Carl Boardley		5–6
(Estonia) ALM Motorsport	Honda Civic Type R TCR (FL5)	48	(Sweden) Mikael Karlsson	D	5
(Estonia) ALM Motorsport	Honda Civic Type R TCR (FL5)	66	(Canada) Gary Kwok		6
(Estonia) ALM Motorsport	Honda Civic Type R TCR (FL5)	69	(Republic of Ireland) Max Hart		1–5
(Estonia) ALM Motorsport	Honda Civic Type R TCR (FL5)	441	(Denmark) René Povlsen	D	5
(Italy) PMA Motorsport	Audi RS 3 LMS TCR (2021)	8	(Italy) Nicola Baldan		All
(Italy) PMA Motorsport	Audi RS 3 LMS TCR (2021)	17	(Canada) Nicolas Taylor	U	All
(Italy) PMA Motorsport	Cupra León VZ TCR	72	(Italy) Sandro Pelatti	D	1, 5
(France) SP Competition	Cupra León VZ TCR	72	(Italy) Sandro Pelatti	D	2–4
(France) SP Competition	Cupra León VZ TCR	9	(France) Tom Chiappe		1–3
(France) SP Competition	Cupra León VZ TCR	38	(France) Tom Pussier		5
(France) SP Competition	Cupra León VZ TCR	112	(Russia) Mikhail Simonov (Note: Simonov competes 1st and 3rd round as a neutral competitor as Russian national emblems were banned by the FIA following the Russian invasion of Ukraine.)		1, 3, 5–6
(Spain) Monlau Motorsport	Cupra León VZ TCR	10	(Sweden) Viktor Andersson	U	All
(Spain) Monlau Motorsport	Cupra León VZ TCR	111	(Italy) Marco Butti	U	All
(Spain) Monlau Motorsport	Cupra León VZ TCR	117	(United Kingdom) Adam Shepherd		All
(United Kingdom) JH Racing	Audi RS 3 LMS TCR (2021)	11	(United Kingdom) Jac Constable		2
(Italy) BRC Racing Team	Hyundai Elantra N TCR	12	(Italy) Gabriele Covini	U	All
(Italy) BRC Racing Team	Hyundai Elantra N TCR	76	(United Kingdom) Alex Ley	U	All
(Spain) RC2 Racing Team	Honda Civic Type R TCR (FL5)	18	(Denmark) Michael Markussen		2–3
(Spain) RC2 Racing Team	Honda Civic Type R TCR (FL5)	19	(Spain) Felipe Fernández		All
(Spain) RC2 Racing Team	Honda Civic Type R TCR (FL5)	37	(Hong Kong) Victor Chan		All
(Spain) RC2 Racing Team	Honda Civic Type R TCR (FL5)	73	(Spain) Victor Fernández	D	All
(United Kingdom) Vannin Motorsport	Audi RS 3 LMS TCR (2021)	20	(France) Teddy Clairet		5
(United Kingdom) Vannin Motorsport	Audi RS 3 LMS TCR (2021)	115	(United Kingdom) Luke Sargeant		5
(Italy) Aikoa Racing	Audi RS 3 LMS TCR (2021)	22	(Italy) Giacomo Prandelli		All
(Italy) Aikoa Racing	Audi RS 3 LMS TCR (2021)	33	(Spain) Santiago Concepción	U	1–3
(Argentina) Squadra Martino	Honda Civic Type R TCR (FL5)	33	(Spain) Santiago Concepción	U	4–5
(Argentina) Squadra Martino	Honda Civic Type R TCR (FL5)	85	(Argentina) Tiago Pernía	U	All
(France) JSB Compétition	Hyundai Elantra N TCR (2024)	24	(France) Julien Briché		1–2, 5–6
(France) JSB Compétition	Hyundai Elantra N TCR	145	(France) Raphael Fournier		1–2, 5
(France) Herrero Racing	Cupra León VZ TCR	29	(France) Matéo Herrero		3
(France) Herrero Racing	Cupra León VZ TCR	74	(France) Victor Weyrich		1–3, 5
(Norway) Stian Paulsen Racing	Audi RS 3 LMS TCR (2021)	34	(Norway) Stian Paulsen		2
(Hungary) Speed Technika	Hyundai i30 N TCR	46	(Hungary) János Csik		4
(South Korea) Solite Indigo Racing	Hyundai Elantra N TCR (2024)	87	(South Korea) Park Jun-ui	U	All
(South Korea) Solite Indigo Racing	Hyundai Elantra N TCR (2024)	97	(South Korea) Park June-sung		All
(Italy) MM Motorsport	Honda Civic Type R TCR (FL5)	486	(Spain) Rubén Fernández		5

Icon	Class
U	Eligible for TCR Europe Under 21 Trophy
D	Eligible for TCR Europe Diamond Trophy
G	Guest drivers ineligible to score points

=== Results ===
Rnd		Circuit	Pole position	Fastest lap	Winning driver	Winning team	Winning Youth driver	Winning Diamond driver
1	1	(Italy) Mugello Circuit	(United Kingdom) Alex Ley	(United Kingdom) Alex Ley	(United Kingdom) Alex Ley	(Italy) BRC Racing Team	(United Kingdom) Alex Ley	(Italy) Sandro Pelatti
1	2	(Italy) Mugello Circuit		(United Kingdom) Alex Ley	(Canada) Nicolas Taylor	(Italy) PMA Motorsport	(Canada) Nicolas Taylor	(Italy) Sandro Pelatti
2	3	(Belgium) Circuit de Spa-Francorchamps	(Spain) Felipe Fernández	(Italy) Marco Butti	(Spain) Felipe Fernández	(Spain) RC2 Racing Team	(Sweden) Viktor Andersson	(Italy) Sandro Pelatti
2	4	(Belgium) Circuit de Spa-Francorchamps		(Estonia) Ruben Volt	(Estonia) Ruben Volt	(Estonia) ALM Motorsport	(Estonia) Ruben Volt	No finishers
3	5	(France) Circuit Paul Ricard	(Sweden) Viktor Andersson	Mikhail Simonov	(Italy) Nicola Baldan	(Italy) PMA Motorsport	(Sweden) Viktor Andersson	(France) Victor Weyrich
3	6	(France) Circuit Paul Ricard		(France) Victor Weyrich	(Canada) Nicolas Taylor	(Italy) PMA Motorsport	(Canada) Nicolas Taylor	(Denmark) Michael Markussen
4	7	(Hungary) Hungaroring	(Italy) Marco Butti	(Estonia) Ruben Volt	(Italy) Marco Butti (Note: Ruben Volt originally won the race, but was later given a 30-second time penalty for having team members work on his car after the five-minute board was shown. Marco Butti, initially classified second, thus inherited the win.)	(Spain) Monlau Motorsport	(Italy) Marco Butti	(Hong Kong) Victor Chan
4	8	(Hungary) Hungaroring		(South Korea) Park Jun-ui	(South Korea) Park Jun-ui	(South Korea) Solite Indigo Racing	(South Korea) Park Jun-ui	(Hong Kong) Victor Chan
5	9	(Italy) Autodromo Nazionale Monza	(Italy) Gabriele Covini	(Italy) Gabriele Covini	(South Korea) Park Jun-ui	(South Korea) Solite Indigo Racing	(South Korea) Park Jun-ui	(Sweden) Mikael Karlsson
5	10	(Italy) Autodromo Nazionale Monza		(United Kingdom) Alex Ley	(United Kingdom) Alex Ley	(Italy) BRC Racing Team	(United Kingdom) Alex Ley	(Denmark) René Povlsen
6	11	(Spain) Circuit de Barcelona-Catalunya	(Germany) Mike Halder	(Italy) Gabriele Covini	(United Kingdom) Adam Shepherd	(Spain) Monlau Motorsport	(Sweden) Viktor Andersson	(Hong Kong) Victor Chan
6	12	(Spain) Circuit de Barcelona-Catalunya		(South Korea) Park June-sung	(South Korea) Park June-sung	(South Korea) Solite Indigo Racing	(Estonia) Ruben Volt	(Hong Kong) Victor Chan

=== Championship standings ===
Scoring system

Position	1st	2nd	3rd	4th	5th	6th	7th	8th	9th	10th	11th	12th	13th	14th	15th
Qualifying	10	8	6	4	2	1									
Races	30	25	22	20	18	16	14	12	10	8	6	4	3	2	1

==== Drivers' championship ====
Pos	Driver	MUG (Italy)		SPA (Belgium)		LEC (France)		HNG (Hungary)		MNZ (Italy)		CAT (Spain)		Pts
1	(Italy) Marco Butti	10	7	3^{4}	6	20^{3}	Ret	1^{1}	3	3	4	6	6	206
2	(Germany) Mike Halder	5^{4}	3	4^{2}	4	17^{2}	14	4	10	17^{4}	7	2^{1}	8	197
3	(Canada) Nicolas Taylor	8	1	5^{5}	2	5	1	8	Ret	14^{3}	Ret	9	3	187
4	(Estonia) Ruben Volt	20	10	12	1	6	5	18^{2}	2	4^{6}	8	5	2	185
5	(Sweden) Viktor Andersson	12	6	2^{3}	12	2^{1}	15	3	4	5	Ret	3	Ret	173
6	(United Kingdom) Alex Ley	1^{1}	2	DNS	DNS	8	12	6^{5}	5	6	1	17	12	167
7	(Italy) Nicola Baldan	6^{6}	5	8	7	1	3	11	Ret	Ret^{5}	2	10	Ret	158
8	(Argentina) Tiago Pernía	16^{3}	8	Ret	3	3^{5}	6	2^{4}	6	13	7	11	16	148
9	(South Korea) Park June-sung	2^{5}	4	7	9	9	19	10	11	20	15	4^{6}	1	147
10	(South Korea) Park Jun-ui	Ret	Ret	13	16	14^{6}	4	9	1	1^{2}	5	16	4	143
11	(United Kingdom) Adam Shepherd	11	16	6^{6}	10	19	16	7	18	2	19	1^{5}	15	103
12	(Russia) Mikhail Simonov	7	9			16	2			Ret	3	Ret^{4}	7	89
13	(Spain) Felipe Fernández	17	12	1^{1}	13	10	17	16^{3}	8	Ret	16	13	13	79
14	(Italy) Gabriele Covini	3^{2}	18	Ret	20	22	7	19^{6}	12	16^{1}	20	14^{2}	Ret	69
15	(Republic of Ireland) Max Hart	4	Ret	9	5	18	Ret	5	13	WD	WD			69
16	(Spain) Santiago Concepción	9	13	11	11	11	11	14	7	18	11			59
17	(Italy) Giacomo Prandelli	13	15	17	8	12	9	17	15	19	9	12	11	51
18	(Hong Kong) Victor Chan	19	17	16	15	15	Ret	12	9	Ret	14	7^{3}	9	48
19	(France) Julien Briché	21	Ret	WD	WD					21	18	8	5	30
20	(Denmark) Michael Markussen			10	14	Ret	8							22
21	(Italy) Sandro Pelatti	15	14	19	Ret	13	10	13	17	12	Ret			21
22	(France) Victor Weyrich	Ret	Ret	Ret	Ret	4	Ret			Ret	Ret			20
23	(United Kingdom) Carl Boardley									8	10	Ret	Ret	20
24	(France) Matéo Herrero					7	13							17
25	(France) Raphael Fournier	18	DSQ	WD	WD					7	22			14
26	(Sweden) Mikael Karlsson									9	13			13
27	(Denmark) René Povlsen									10	12			12
28	(Spain) Victor Fernández	22	Ret	Ret	Ret	Ret	18	15	16	Ret	23	15	10	9
29	(France) Tom Chiappe	14	11	18	19	21	Ret							8
30	(United Kingdom) Luke Sargeant									11	Ret			6
31	(Norway) Stian Paulsen			14	18									2
32	(Canada) Gary Kwok											18	14	2
33	(Hungary) János Csik							Ret	14					2
34	(United Kingdom) Jac Constable			15	17									1
35	(France) Tom Pussier									15	17			1
36	(France) Teddy Clairet									Ret	21			0
—	(Spain) Ruben Fernández									DNS	DNS			0
Pos	Driver	MUG (Italy)		SPA (Belgium)		LEC (France)		HNG (Hungary)		MNZ (Italy)		CAT (Spain)		Pts

Colour	Result
Gold	Winner
Silver	Second place
Bronze	Third place
Green	Points classification
Blue	Non-points classification
Blue	Non-classified finish (NC)
Purple	Retired, not classified (Ret)
Red	Did not qualify (DNQ)
Red	Did not pre-qualify (DNPQ)
Black	Disqualified (DSQ)
White	Did not start (DNS)
White	Withdrew (WD)
White	Race cancelled (C)
Blank	Did not practice (DNP)
Blank	Did not arrive (DNA)
Blank	Excluded (EX)

^{1} ^{2} ^{3} ^{4} ^{5} ^{6} ^{7} – Points-scoring position in qualifying, only counting Rookie drivers.

==== Teams' championship ====
Pos	Team	Pts
1	(Estonia) ALM Motorsport	408
2	(Spain) Monlau Motorsport	403
3	(Italy) PMA Motorsport	383
4	(South Korea) Solite Indigo Racing	320
5	(Italy) BRC Racing Team	312
6	(Argentina) Squadra Martino	194
7	(Spain) RC2 Racing Team	160
8	(Italy) AIKOA Racing	123
9	(France) SP Competition	120
10	(France) JSB Compétition	50
11	(France) Herrero Racing	40
12	(United Kingdom) Vannin Motorsport	14
13	(Norway) Stian Paulsen Racing	7
14	(United Kingdom) JH Racing	6
15	(Hungary) Speed Technika	3

== TCR Europe Cup ==
The TCR Europe Cup was announced on 30 November 2025 as a compact touring car series for the 2026 season. It consists of two events at the Circuit de Spa-Francorchamps and the Circuit de Barcelona-Catalunya, designed as a cost-effective entry point into international touring car racing.The second event was cancelled, however, meaning Santiago Concepción is the champion.

The format features two drivers sharing a car — an amateur or semi-professional paired with a professional. A "professional" driver is defined as one who ranked in the top 50 of the Kumho TCR World Ranking in 2024 or 2025, finished in the top five of the TCR Europe Touring Car Series standings, or has won a national TCR title. The champions receive a 50% discount on entry fees for the following TCR Europe Touring Car Series season.

=== Teams & drivers ===
Team	Car	No.	Drivers	Class	Round
(Italy) PMA Motorsport	Cupra León VZ TCR	7	(Italy) Sandro Pelatti		All
(Italy) PMA Motorsport	Audi RS 3 LMS TCR (2021)	11	(Italy) Nicola Baldan		All
(Italy) PMA Motorsport	Audi RS 3 LMS TCR (2021)	11	(Canada) Nicolas Taylor		All
(Spain) Monlau Motorsport	Cupra León VZ TCR	10	(Sweden) Viktor Andersson		All
(Spain) RC2 Racing Team	Honda Civic Type R TCR (FL5)	19	(Spain) Felipe Fernández		All
(Spain) RC2 Racing Team	Honda Civic Type R TCR (FL5)	19	(Spain) Victor Fernández		All
(Spain) RC2 Racing Team	Honda Civic Type R TCR (FL5)	246	(United Kingdom) Jenson Brickley		All
(Spain) RC2 Racing Team	Honda Civic Type R TCR (FL5)	246	(Venezuela) Sergio Lopez		All
(Italy) Aikoa Racing	Audi RS 3 LMS TCR (2021)	22	(Italy) Giacomo Prandelli		All
(Italy) Aikoa Racing	Audi RS 3 LMS TCR (2021)	33	(Spain) Santiago Concepción		All
(Italy) Aikoa Racing	Audi RS 3 LMS TCR (2021)	33	(Spain) Rubén Fernández		All
(Italy) BRC Hyundai N Squadra Corse	Hyundai Elantra N TCR	30	(United Kingdom) Alex Ley		All
(Italy) BRC Hyundai N Squadra Corse	Hyundai Elantra N TCR	30	(Italy) Gabriele Covini		All
(Argentina) Squadra Martino	Honda Civic Type R TCR (FL5)	85	(Argentina) Tiago Pernía		All
(Argentina) Squadra Martino	Honda Civic Type R TCR (FL5)	85	(Argentina) Leonel Pernía		All
(South Korea) Solite Indigo Racing	Hyundai Elantra N TCR (2024)	97	(South Korea) Park Jun-ui		All
(South Korea) Solite Indigo Racing	Hyundai Elantra N TCR (2024)	97	(South Korea) Park June-sung		All

=== Calendar & Results ===
The second race weekend of the 2026 season was cancelled. The promoter stated that the series did not develop as expected, leading to the cancellation of the planned Barcelona finale to allow teams to focus on the remaining TCR Europe events. Santiago Concepción and Park Jun-ui each won a race and finished the season tied on 30 points. Concepción won the title on countback based on his superior qualifying result and was also awarded the RTI Trophy.

Rnd.		Circuit	Date	Pole position	Fastest lap	Winning driver	Winning team	Supporting
1	1	(Belgium) Circuit de Spa-Francorchamps	16–19 April	(United Kingdom) Alex Ley (Italy) Gabriele Covini	(United Kingdom) Alex Ley	(Spain) Santiago Concepción	(Italy) Aikoa Racing	24H Series; Radical Cup Europe
1	2	(Belgium) Circuit de Spa-Francorchamps	16–19 April	(Italy) Gabriele Covini (United Kingdom) Alex Ley	(Italy) Nicola Baldan	(South Korea) Park Jun-ui	(South Korea) Solite Indigo Racing	24H Series; Radical Cup Europe

=== Championship standings ===
It uses the same scoring system as the Main Series.

Scoring system

Position	1st	2nd	3rd	4th	5th	6th	7th	8th	9th	10th	11th	12th	13th	14th	15th
Qualifying	10	8	6	4	2	1									
Races	30	25	22	20	18	16	14	12	10	8	6	4	3	2	1
