= 2026 Euroformula Open Championship =

2026 formula racing championship

The 2026 Euroformula Open Championship was a multi-event open-wheel single-seater motor racing championship held across Europe. It was the thirteenth season using the Euroformula Open name. The season was held over eight rounds, it started on 17 April at Algarve International Circuit and concluded on 25 October at Circuit de Barcelona-Catalunya.

Team Motopark driver Enzo Yeh won the Drivers' Championship title with three races to spare, while his teammate Wiktor Dobrzański won the Rookies' Championship title and their team defended their Teams' Championship title for the eighth year in a row.

== Teams and drivers ==
All drivers competed with a Toyota-powered Dallara 324 car on Pirelli tires.

Team	No.	Driver	Status	Rounds
(Italy) BVM Racing	1	(Italy) Niccolò Maccagnani	R	7
(Italy) BVM Racing	3	(Mexico) Javier Herrera	R	All
(Italy) BVM Racing	4	(Brazil) Ricardo Baptista	R	3, 8
(Italy) BVM Racing	8	(Brazil) Alceu Feldmann Neto		2, 5
(Italy) BVM Racing	8	(Netherlands) Niels Koolen		8
(Italy) BVM Racing	11	(Venezuela) Alessandro Famularo		All
(Italy) BVM Racing	46	(India) Ary Bansal	R G	8
(Italy) BVM Racing	55	(India) Divy Nandan		1–6
(Italy) BVM Racing	64	(Netherlands) Maya Weug		6
(Italy) BVM Racing	1	(Brazil) Celo Hahn	R	4
(Spain) Drivex	14	(Brazil) Celo Hahn	R	5
(Spain) Drivex	37	(Brazil) Filippo Fiorentino	R	2, 5
(Spain) Drivex	48	(Argentina) Gino Trappa	R	2, 5
(Germany) Team Motopark	7	(Poland) Wiktor Dobrzański	R	All
(Germany) Team Motopark	9	(United States) Everett Stack		1–6
(Germany) Team Motopark	9	(Netherlands) Niels Koolen		7
(Germany) Team Motopark	9	(China) Yuhao Fu	G	8
(Germany) Team Motopark	10	(Mexico) Lorenzo Castillo	R	All
(Germany) Team Motopark	21	(Chinese Taipei) Enzo Yeh		All
(Germany) Team Motopark	27	(Mexico) Jesse Carrasquedo Jr.		All
(Germany) Team Motopark	44	(Mexico) Diego de la Torre		All
(Germany) Team Motopark	50	(Czech Republic) Jan Koller	R	All
(Belgium) Neri Autosport	58	(Belgium) Aaron Ferrazzano	R	All

Icon	Class
R	Rookie Championship
G	Guest driver

- G Motorsport announced a two-car entry into the Euroformula Open Championship, but did not enter any rounds.
- Nielsen Racing announced it would enter three cars under a newly rebranded Northstar Racing guise, but did not enter any rounds.

== Race calendar ==
The eight-round calendar was announced on 18 July 2025. The championship made its debut at Misano World Circuit, while the Red Bull Ring was not part of the schedule for the first time since the 2018 season. The season finale at Circuit de Barcelona-Catalunya was later shifted by a week to 23–25 October.

Round		Circuit	Date	Support bill	Map of circuit locations
1	R1	(Portugal) Algarve International Circuit, Portimão	18 April	International GT Open; GT Cup Open Europe	2026 Euroformula Open Championship is located in Europe
1	R2	(Portugal) Algarve International Circuit, Portimão	19 April	International GT Open; GT Cup Open Europe	2026 Euroformula Open Championship is located in Europe
1	R3	(Portugal) Algarve International Circuit, Portimão	19 April	International GT Open; GT Cup Open Europe	2026 Euroformula Open Championship is located in Europe
2	R1	(Belgium) Circuit de Spa-Francorchamps, Stavelot	16 May	International GT Open; TCR Europe Touring Car Series; GT Cup Open Europe; Porsche Carrera Cup Germany	2026 Euroformula Open Championship is located in Europe
2	R2	(Belgium) Circuit de Spa-Francorchamps, Stavelot	17 May	International GT Open; TCR Europe Touring Car Series; GT Cup Open Europe; Porsche Carrera Cup Germany	2026 Euroformula Open Championship is located in Europe
2	R3	(Belgium) Circuit de Spa-Francorchamps, Stavelot	17 May	International GT Open; TCR Europe Touring Car Series; GT Cup Open Europe; Porsche Carrera Cup Germany	2026 Euroformula Open Championship is located in Europe
3	R1	(Italy) Misano World Circuit, Misano Adriatico	6 June	International GT Open; GT Cup Open Europe	2026 Euroformula Open Championship is located in Europe
3	R2	(Italy) Misano World Circuit, Misano Adriatico	7 June	International GT Open; GT Cup Open Europe	2026 Euroformula Open Championship is located in Europe
3	R3	(Italy) Misano World Circuit, Misano Adriatico	7 June	International GT Open; GT Cup Open Europe	2026 Euroformula Open Championship is located in Europe
4	R1	(Hungary) Hungaroring, Mogyoród	4 July	International GT Open; Formula Regional European Championship; TCR Europe Touring Car Series; GB3 Championship	2026 Euroformula Open Championship is located in Europe
4	R2	(Hungary) Hungaroring, Mogyoród	5 July	International GT Open; Formula Regional European Championship; TCR Europe Touring Car Series; GB3 Championship	2026 Euroformula Open Championship is located in Europe
4	R3	(Hungary) Hungaroring, Mogyoród	5 July	International GT Open; Formula Regional European Championship; TCR Europe Touring Car Series; GB3 Championship	2026 Euroformula Open Championship is located in Europe
5	R1	(France) Circuit Paul Ricard, Le Castellet	18 July	International GT Open; Formula Regional European Championship; E4 Championship; GT Cup Open Europe	2026 Euroformula Open Championship is located in Europe
5	R2	(France) Circuit Paul Ricard, Le Castellet	19 July	International GT Open; Formula Regional European Championship; E4 Championship; GT Cup Open Europe	2026 Euroformula Open Championship is located in Europe
5	R3	(France) Circuit Paul Ricard, Le Castellet	19 July	International GT Open; Formula Regional European Championship; E4 Championship; GT Cup Open Europe	2026 Euroformula Open Championship is located in Europe
6	R1	(Germany) Hockenheimring, Hockenheim	12 September	International GT Open; GT Cup Open Europe; Formula Regional European Championship	2026 Euroformula Open Championship is located in Europe
6	R2	(Germany) Hockenheimring, Hockenheim	13 September	International GT Open; GT Cup Open Europe; Formula Regional European Championship	2026 Euroformula Open Championship is located in Europe
6	R3	(Germany) Hockenheimring, Hockenheim	13 September	International GT Open; GT Cup Open Europe; Formula Regional European Championship	2026 Euroformula Open Championship is located in Europe
7	R1	(Italy) Monza Circuit, Monza	26 September	International GT Open; TCR Europe Touring Car Series	2026 Euroformula Open Championship is located in Europe
7	R2	(Italy) Monza Circuit, Monza	26 September	International GT Open; TCR Europe Touring Car Series	2026 Euroformula Open Championship is located in Europe
7	R3	(Italy) Monza Circuit, Monza	27 September	International GT Open; TCR Europe Touring Car Series	2026 Euroformula Open Championship is located in Europe
8	R1	(Spain) Circuit de Barcelona-Catalunya, Montmeló	24 October	International GT Open; TCR Europe Touring Car Series; GT Cup Open Europe	2026 Euroformula Open Championship is located in Europe
8	R2	(Spain) Circuit de Barcelona-Catalunya, Montmeló	25 October	International GT Open; TCR Europe Touring Car Series; GT Cup Open Europe	2026 Euroformula Open Championship is located in Europe
8	R3	(Spain) Circuit de Barcelona-Catalunya, Montmeló	25 October	International GT Open; TCR Europe Touring Car Series; GT Cup Open Europe	2026 Euroformula Open Championship is located in Europe

== Race results ==
Round		Circuit	Pole position	Fastest lap	Winning driver	Winning team	Rookie winner
1	R1	(Portugal) Algarve International Circuit	(Chinese Taipei) Enzo Yeh	(Chinese Taipei) Enzo Yeh	(Chinese Taipei) Enzo Yeh	(Germany) Team Motopark	(Poland) Wiktor Dobrzański
1	R2	(Portugal) Algarve International Circuit		(Mexico) Jesse Carrasquedo Jr.	(Venezuela) Alessandro Famularo	(Italy) BVM Racing	(Poland) Wiktor Dobrzański
1	R3	(Portugal) Algarve International Circuit		(Mexico) Jesse Carrasquedo Jr.	(Chinese Taipei) Enzo Yeh	(Germany) Team Motopark	(Mexico) Lorenzo Castillo
2	R1	(Belgium) Circuit de Spa-Francorchamps	(Chinese Taipei) Enzo Yeh	(Mexico) Diego de la Torre	(Chinese Taipei) Enzo Yeh	(Germany) Team Motopark	(Mexico) Javier Herrera
2	R2	(Belgium) Circuit de Spa-Francorchamps		(Mexico) Diego de la Torre	(Chinese Taipei) Enzo Yeh	(Germany) Team Motopark	(Mexico) Javier Herrera
2	R3	(Belgium) Circuit de Spa-Francorchamps		(Argentina) Gino Trappa	(Chinese Taipei) Enzo Yeh	(Germany) Team Motopark	(Argentina) Gino Trappa
3	R1	(Italy) Misano World Circuit	(Mexico) Javier Herrera	(Mexico) Javier Herrera	(Mexico) Javier Herrera	(Italy) BVM Racing	(Mexico) Javier Herrera
3	R2	(Italy) Misano World Circuit		(Venezuela) Alessandro Famularo	(Mexico) Jesse Carrasquedo Jr.	(Germany) Team Motopark	(Poland) Wiktor Dobrzański
3	R3	(Italy) Misano World Circuit		(Mexico) Jesse Carrasquedo Jr.	(Mexico) Jesse Carrasquedo Jr.	(Germany) Team Motopark	(Mexico) Javier Herrera
4	R1	(Hungary) Hungaroring	(Mexico) Javier Herrera	(United States) Everett Stack	(United States) Everett Stack	(Germany) Team Motopark	(Mexico) Javier Herrera
4	R2	(Hungary) Hungaroring		(Czech Republic) Jan Koller	(Mexico) Diego de la Torre	(Germany) Team Motopark	(Mexico) Javier Herrera
4	R3	(Hungary) Hungaroring		(Chinese Taipei) Enzo Yeh	(Chinese Taipei) Enzo Yeh	(Germany) Team Motopark	(Mexico) Javier Herrera
5	R1	(France) Circuit Paul Ricard	(Mexico) Jesse Carrasquedo Jr.	(Mexico) Diego de la Torre	(Mexico) Jesse Carrasquedo Jr.	(Germany) Team Motopark	(Mexico) Javier Herrera
5	R2	(France) Circuit Paul Ricard		(Mexico) Diego de la Torre	(Brazil) Filippo Fiorentino	(Spain) Drivex	(Brazil) Filippo Fiorentino
5	R3	(France) Circuit Paul Ricard		(Chinese Taipei) Enzo Yeh	(United States) Everett Stack	(Germany) Team Motopark	(Argentina) Gino Trappa
6	R1	(Germany) Hockenheimring	(Mexico) Jesse Carrasquedo Jr.	(Mexico) Jesse Carrasquedo Jr.	(Chinese Taipei) Enzo Yeh	(Germany) Team Motopark	(Czech Republic) Jan Koller
6	R2	(Germany) Hockenheimring		(Chinese Taipei) Enzo Yeh	(Venezuela) Alessandro Famularo	(Italy) BVM Racing	(Mexico) Javier Herrera
6	R3	(Germany) Hockenheimring		(Chinese Taipei) Enzo Yeh	(Mexico) Diego de la Torre	(Germany) Team Motopark	(Poland) Wiktor Dobrzański
7	R1	(Italy) Monza Circuit	(Mexico) Jesse Carrasquedo Jr.	(Mexico) Diego de la Torre	(Mexico) Diego de la Torre	(Germany) Team Motopark	(Mexico) Javier Herrera
7	R2	(Italy) Monza Circuit		(Mexico) Diego de la Torre	(Mexico) Diego de la Torre	(Germany) Team Motopark	(Italy) Niccolò Maccagnani
7	R3	(Italy) Monza Circuit		(Poland) Wiktor Dobrzański	(Chinese Taipei) Enzo Yeh	(Germany) Team Motopark	(Poland) Wiktor Dobrzański
8	R1	(Spain) Circuit de Barcelona-Catalunya	(Mexico) Jesse Carrasquedo Jr.	(Mexico) Javier Herrera	(Chinese Taipei) Enzo Yeh	(Germany) Team Motopark	(Poland) Wiktor Dobrzański
8	R2	(Spain) Circuit de Barcelona-Catalunya		(Mexico) Javier Herrera	(Mexico) Diego de la Torre	(Germany) Team Motopark	(Brazil) Ricardo Baptista
8	R3	(Spain) Circuit de Barcelona-Catalunya		(Mexico) Javier Herrera	(Chinese Taipei) Enzo Yeh	(Germany) Team Motopark	(India) Ary Bansal

== Season report ==
=== First half ===
The first round of the 2026 Euroformula Open Championship was held at the Algarve International Circuit. Enzo Yeh claimed pole position for Team Motopark, before four cars stalled off the line at the start of the first race. Yeh and his two teammates Diego de la Torre and Everett Stack were not among those and assumed the top three positions. The leader remained untroubled for the remainder of the race to seal victory as Stack passed De la Torre for second place. Race two saw BVM's Divy Nandan start first, with teammate Alessandro Famularo slotting into second. Nandan ran wide and fell to fifth on the penultimate lap, handing the lead and the win to Famularo. Yeh finished third, before a penalty dropped him to fifth and Stack inherited the podium. Race three began with a slow start for both front-row starters, allowing Stack into the lead. A collision with his teammate Jesse Carrasquedo Jr. then put both out of contention, allowing Yeh to claim a second victory ahead of De la Torre and Famularo to end the weekend leading the standings.

Round two at Circuit de Spa-Francorchamps saw Yeh take pole position in qualifying once again. He led Carrasquedo Jr. throughout the opening part of the first race, before a lock-up for the latter saw De la Torre take second. Carrasquedo Jr. and Stack then collided fighting over third, allowing BVM's Javier Herrera through on the final lap. Race two saw Motopark's Lorenzo Castillo jump the start as Yeh rose from sixth on the grid to the lead on lap two. Stack initially held second, before being handed a drive-through penalty. That handed second to Herrera, with Carrasquedo Jr. taking third. Race three began under safety car after rain. Despite a closed pitlane, Yeh and Famularo took on slick tires right away. The rest of the field changed tires when the safety car was withdrawn, handing a big lead to Yeh and Famularo. The pair received drive-through penalties, which dropped Famularo to fourth behind Stack and Drivex's Gino Trappa, but made no difference for Yeh, who took his fourth win in a row to grow his championship lead over De la Torre to 49 points.

Next came the series' debut at Misano World Circuit, where Herrera secured pole position in qualifying. He gapped points leader Yeh throughout the opening race as Famularo pressured Stack for third. The Venezuelan got past him on lap nine after multiple attempts and secured the final podium spot as championship chaser De la Torre finished outside the points. The second race saw Motopark's Wiktor Dobrzański start in first, with Carrasquedo Jr. alongside him as Yeh and Herrera slotted in behind. Herrera pressured Yeh until he was able to pass him on lap ten, before Carrasquedo Jr. was able to do the same to the leader on lap 16 to claim victory. A post-race penalty for Herrera handed third back to Yeh, who was then unable to partake in the formation lap for race three and dropped to the back. Carrasquedo Jr. won that race from pole position as Stack and De la Torre secured podium positions. Yeh recovered to sixth by lap four before he fought Herrera and ultimately remained sixth, still increasing his lead over De la Torre to now 65 points.

The first half of the season concluded at the Hungaroring, and Herrera took pole position again. A bad start to the first race for him and teammate Famularo saw Stack and Yeh move into first and second, before Herrera reclaimed second off Yeh with a move that was later penalized for contact. Meanwhile, Stack was free to build a gap and convert his lead into victory. Herrera's penalty saw him drop to fourth behind Famularo. Carrasquedo Jr. had pole position for race two, but also got away slowly, allowing De la Torre and Yeh past him. Yeh tried taking the lead twice, but De la Torre held on to victory as Carrasquedo Jr. dropped down the order to fifth and Stack took the final spot on the podium. The battle for the lead repeated itself in race three, as polesitter De la Torre once again had to contend with Yeh, wo overtook Carrasquedo Jr. at the start. This time, Yeh was able to force De la Torre into a mistake and take the lead on lap 15. He claimed victory as his three top-two finishes placed him 74 points ahead of De la Torre in the championship.

=== Second half ===
Round five at Circuit Paul Ricard saw pole position in qualifying go to Carrasquedo Jr. ahead of Herrera and De la Torre. Yeh started fourth and immediately moved into second at the start of the first race, before Stack took third off Herrera. The top three positions remained unchanged afterwards as Carrasquedo Jr. took a controlled victory. Reverse grid pole position for race two went to Drivex's Filippo Fiorentino, who led Trappa before the latter dropped to sixth. Dobrzański fended off Herrera for second place, before the latter dropped back towards De la Torre and the pair made contact. Resulting damage for De la Torre saw Herrera take third place as Fiorentino claimed the first win for Drivex since 2019. Race three saw Koller initially hold on to pole position as Famularo dropped behind Stack, who claimed the lead soon after. Yeh then suffered a puncture while trying to take third, before Trappa moved into second ahead of Koller. Stack took victory to move into second in the standings as Yeh's lead was reduced to 60 points after he finished tenth.

Three drivers withdrew ahead of round six at the Hockenheimring, among them second-placed man Stack, as Carrasquedo Jr. took another pole position. Yeh, however, had the better start from second place and took the lead into the first turn. Dobrzański initially claimed third, before losing out to De la Torre on lap three. By that point the leading pair was gapping the remaining six cars, and Yeh claimed the seventh win of his campaign. Castillo and Koller formed the front row for race two, before Famularo passed both on the opening lap. The pair then made contact and both retired, before De la Torre lost out to both Carrasquedo Jr. and Yeh, who finished second and third after Famularo held them both off. Race control mandated wet tires as it rained ahead of race three, but Herrera and Famularo still started on dry tires. The pair then pitted while the pitlane was closed, and both were disqualified. De la Torre won an otherwise uneventful race ahead of Dobrzański and Yeh, moving into second place in the standings, 85 points behind leader Yeh.

The penultimate round of the season at Monza Circuit began with another pole position for Carrasquedo Jr., but neither he nor fellow front-row starter De la Torre managed to make a good start to the first race and lost out to Yeh, BVM's debutant Niccolò Maccagnani and Herrera. The latter then got into the lead, before De la Torre reentered the lead battle and eventually took victory ahead of Herrera and Famularo. Yeh dropped to sixth, handing him a front-row start next to teammate Niels Koolen, who stalled off the line. That promoted Maccagnani to second, before he took the lead. He remained there until De la Torre overtook both of the top two in one move along the main straight. Despite efforts from Yeh and Maccagnani behind, De la Torre held on to take another victory. Race three saw the battle resume straight away, but this time it ended in retirement for De la Torre after colliding with Herrera. Yeh claimed victory, thereby also sealing the championship title with three races to spare, as Carrasquedo Jr. and Dobrzański completed the podium.

== Championship standings ==
=== Drivers' championship ===
Points were awarded as follows:

Position	1st	2nd	3rd	4th	5th	6th	7th	8th	9th	10th	Pole	FL
Points	25	18	15	12	10	8	6	4	2	1	**1**	1

Each drivers' three worst scores (excluding disqualifications) were dropped.

Pos	Driver	PRT (Portugal)			SPA (Belgium)			MIS (Italy)			HUN (Hungary)			LEC (France)			HOC (Germany)			MNZ (Italy)			CAT (Spain)			Pts
Pos	Driver	R1	R2	R3	R1	R2	R3	R1	R2	R3	R1	R2	R3	R1	R2	R3	R1	R2	R3	R1	R2	R3	R1	R2	R3	Pts
1	(Chinese Taipei) Enzo Yeh	**1**	5	1	**1**	1	1	2	3	(6)	2	2	1	2	5	(10)	1	3	3	6	2	1	1	(8)	1	420
2	(Mexico) Diego de la Torre	3	2	2	2	6	5	(11)	5	3	5	1	2	4	(14)	4	3	5	1	1	1	(Ret)	3	1	6	345
3	(Mexico) Jesse Carrasquedo Jr.	4	7	(Ret)	(13†)	3	6	5	1	1	6	5	3	**1**	6	(11†)	**2**	2	4	**8**	4	2	**2**	5	8	291
4	(Venezuela) Alessandro Famularo	5	1	3	7	7	4	3	(Ret)	5	3	6	5	10	8	(Ret)	4	1	DSQ	3	(Ret)	4	7	4	7	228
5	(United States) Everett Stack	2	3	10	4	13†	2	4	4	2	1	3	4	3	4	1	WD	WD	WD							211
6	(Mexico) Javier Herrera	8	(11)	6	3	2	9	**1**	10	4	**4**	4	6	5	3	5	(DNS)	4	DSQ	2	(Ret)	8	8	6	9	208
7	(Poland) Wiktor Dobrzański	7	4	8	(12)	9	8	6	2	8	8	7	7	6	2	(Ret)	7	6	2	(Ret)	5	3	5	3	11	185
8	(Czech Republic) Jan Koller	11	6	7	(Ret)	11	12	12	7	10	12	8	(Ret)	(Ret)	9	3	5	Ret	7	Ret	7	6	11	9	3	97
9	(Mexico) Lorenzo Castillo	9	8	4	8	8	10	7	9	11	7	9	9	(Ret)	11	7	6	(Ret)	6	7	8	5	(Ret)	12	13	88
10	(Brazil) Ricardo Baptista							8	6	7													6	2	4	59
11	(Argentina) Gino Trappa				5	12†	3							7	7	2										56
12	(Brazil) Filippo Fiorentino				6	10	7							8	1	9										46
13	(Netherlands) Niels Koolen																			5	6	9	4	13†	5	44
14	(Belgium) Aaron Ferrazzano	10	10	5	9	5	13	10	11	9	11	10	Ret	Ret	13	Ret	(WD)	(WD)	(WD)	9	9	7	12	10	12	42
15	(India) Divy Nandan	6	9	9	10	4	11	9	8	12	10	12	8	11	15	Ret	WD	WD	WD							36
16	(Italy) Niccolò Maccagnani																			4	3	Ret				27
17	(Netherlands) Maya Weug																8	7	5							20
18	(Brazil) Alceu Feldmann Neto				11	Ret	Ret							Ret	10	6										9
19	(Brazil) Celo Hahn										9	11	10	9	12	8										9
Guest drivers ineligible to score points
—	(India) Ary Bansal																						9	7	2	0
—	(China) Yuhao Fu																						10	11	10	0
Pos	Driver	R1	R2	R3	R1	R2	R3	R1	R2	R3	R1	R2	R3	R1	R2	R3	R1	R2	R3	R1	R2	R3	R1	R2	R3	Pts
Pos	Driver	PRT (Portugal)			SPA (Belgium)			MIS (Italy)			HUN (Hungary)			LEC (France)			HOC (Germany)			MNZ (Italy)			CAT (Spain)			Pts

Colour	Result
Gold	Winner
Silver	Second place
Bronze	Third place
Green	Points classification
Blue	Non-points classification
Blue	Non-classified finish (NC)
Purple	Retired, not classified (Ret)
Red	Did not qualify (DNQ)
Red	Did not pre-qualify (DNPQ)
Black	Disqualified (DSQ)
White	Did not start (DNS)
White	Withdrew (WD)
White	Race cancelled (C)
Blank	Did not practice (DNP)
Blank	Did not arrive (DNA)
Blank	Excluded (EX)

**Bold** – Pole

Italics – Fastest Lap

† – Did not finish, but classified
(completed more than 75%
of the race distance)

=== Rookies' championship ===
Points were awarded as follows:

Position	1st	2nd	3rd	4th	5th
Points	10	8	6	4	3

Pos	Driver	PRT (Portugal)			SPA (Belgium)			MIS (Italy)			HUN (Hungary)			LEC (France)			HOC (Germany)			MNZ (Italy)			CAT (Spain)			Pts
Pos	Driver	R1	R2	R3	R1	R2	R3	R1	R2	R3	R1	R2	R3	R1	R2	R3	R1	R2	R3	R1	R2	R3	R1	R2	R3	Pts
1	(Poland) Wiktor Dobrzański	1	1	5	7	4	3	2	1	3	3	2	2	2	2	Ret	3	2	1	Ret	2	1	1	2	5	159
2	(Mexico) Javier Herrera	2	5	3	1	1	4	1	5	1	1	1	1	1	3	3	DNS	1	DSQ	1	Ret	5	3	3	4	157
3	(Mexico) Lorenzo Castillo	3	3	1	4	3	5	3	4	6	2	4	3	Ret	7	5	2	Ret	2	3	4	2	Ret	7	7	100
4	(Czech Republic) Jan Koller	5	2	4	Ret	6	6	6	3	5	6	3	Ret	Ret	5	2	1	Ret	3	Ret	3	3	5	5	2	87
5	(Belgium) Aaron Ferrazzano	4	4	2	5	2	7	5	6	4	5	5	Ret	Ret	9	Ret	WD	WD	WD	4	5	4	6	6	6	60
6	(Brazil) Ricardo Baptista							4	2	2													2	1	3	46
7	(Argentina) Gino Trappa				2	7†	1							3	4	1										38
8	(Brazil) Filippo Fiorentino				3	5	2							4	1	7										31
9	(Italy) Niccolò Maccagnani																			2	1	Ret				18
10	(Brazil) Celo Hahn										4	6	4	5	8	6										11
11	(Brazil) Alceu Feldmann Neto				6	Ret	Ret							Ret	6	4										4
Guest drivers ineligible to score points
—	(India) Ary Bansal																						4	4	1	0
Pos	Driver	R1	R2	R3	R1	R2	R3	R1	R2	R3	R1	R2	R3	R1	R2	R3	R1	R2	R3	R1	R2	R3	R1	R2	R3	Pts
Pos	Driver	PRT (Portugal)			SPA (Belgium)			MIS (Italy)			HUN (Hungary)			LEC (France)			HOC (Germany)			MNZ (Italy)			CAT (Spain)			Pts

=== Teams' championship ===
Points were awarded according to the same structure as in the rookies' championship, with each team nominating two drivers to score teams' championship points ahead of the round and non-nominated drivers not scoring nor blocking points.

Pos	Team	Points
1	(Germany) Team Motopark	356
2	(Italy) BVM Racing	225
3	(Spain) Drivex	64
4	(Belgium) Neri Autosport	60
Pos	Team	Points
