= Viktor Andersson (racing driver) =

Swedish racing driver (born 2003)

- Viktor Andersson in 2026
- Nationality: (Sweden) Swedish
- Born: Viktor Jan Mattias Andersson; 17 August 2003 (age 23) Linköping, Sweden
- Relatives: Mattias Andersson (father)

TCR Europe Touring Car Series career
- Current team: Monlau Motorsport
- Car number: 10
- Starts: 50
- Wins: 0
- Podiums: 8
- Poles: 3
- Best finish: 5th in 2023, 2026

Previous series
- 2022 2020–21 2019 2019 2018: U.S. F2000 National Championship; Formula 4 United States Championship; Formula Nordic - North European Zone Cup; Formula Nordic - Swedish Junior Championship; Formula STCC Nordic

Championship titles
- 2019: Formula Nordic - Swedish Junior Championship

Viktor Jan Mattias Andersson (born 17 August 2003) is a Swedish racing driver who competes in the TCR Europe Touring Car Series and TCR Spain for Monlau Motorsport, driving a Cupra León VZ TCR. He previously raced for the family-run MA:GP team from 2018 to 2025, and competed in the U.S. F2000 National Championship with Velocity Racing Development in 2022.

== Racing career ==
=== U.S. F2000 National Championship ===
On 19 December 2022, it was announced that Andersson would move up to the U.S. F2000 National Championship with Velocity Racing Development to compete in the 2022 season.

=== TCR Europe, TCR Spain and FIA TCR World Tour ===
In January 2026, Andersson signed with Monlau Motorsport, backed by Cupra Sweden, ending a three-year stint with MA:GP. He won the TCR Spain season opener at Jarama from pole position in his first race for the team, and went on to lead the TCR Spain championship for most of the season, including a maximum-points weekend at Valencia in June. As of September 2026 he leads the TCR Spain standings by 28 points.

In TCR Europe, Andersson took pole position at Circuit Paul Ricard in June 2026, setting a new lap record and securing his first pole in the series since May 2023. He took further podiums at Spa-Francorchamps and the Hungaroring, and as of September 2026 is second in the drivers' championship, also leading the young drivers' trophy.

Andersson also made guest appearances in the FIA TCR World Tour in 2026, topping opening practice at Valencia and winning the ETS Guest Star Trophy for the best-placed guest driver more times than any other driver, extending his run to five consecutive wins by July. Racing for SP Compétition as a late call-up at Vila Real in July 2026, he claimed his first FIA TCR World Tour podium (third place) on the demanding street circuit.

=== Career summary ===
Season	Series	Team	Races	Wins	Poles	F/Laps	Podiums	Points	Position
2018	Formula STCC Nordic	MA:GP	12	0	2	0	1	90	6th
2019	Formula Nordic - Swedish Junior Championship	MA:GP	20	4	5	8	16	361	**1st**
2019	Formula Nordic - North European Zone Cup	MA:GP	20	4	5	8	16	361	**2nd**
2020	Formula 4 United States Championship	Crosslink/Kiwi Motorsport	3	0	0	0	1	4	27th
2021	Formula 4 United States Championship	Crosslink/Kiwi Motorsport	17	0	0	0	0	15	20th
2022	USF2000 Championship	Velocity Racing Development	12	0	0	0	0	81	19th
2023	TCR Europe Touring Car Series	MA:GP	14	0	2	1	1	247	5th
2023	TCR World Tour	MA:GP	6	0	0	0	0	5	48th
2024	TCR Europe Touring Car Series	MA:GP	12	0	0	0	2	230	7th
2024	TCR Eastern Europe Trophy	MA:GP	2	0	0	0	1	0	NC†
2024	TCR UK Touring Car Championship	Pro Alloys Racing Lynk & Co	3	1	0	0	1	72	15th
2025	TCR Europe Touring Car Series	MA:GP	12	0	0	0	1	129	11th
2025	TCR World Tour	MA:GP	7	0	0	0	0	31	20th
2025	TCR Eastern Europe Trophy	MA:GP	2	0	0	0	0	12	13th
2026	TCR Europe Touring Car Series	Monlau Motorsport	12	0	1	0	4	173	5th
2026	TCR Europe Cup	Monlau Motorsport							
2026	TCR Spain	Monlau Motorsport	6	3	2	0	6	184	**1st***
2026	TCR World Tour	Monlau Motorsport	5	0	0	0	0	150	9th*
2026	TCR World Tour	SP Compétition	5	1	0	0	2	150	9th*

^{*} Season still in progress.

=== American open-wheel racing results ===
==== U.S. F2000 National Championship ====
(key) (Races in bold indicate pole position) (Races in italics indicate fastest lap) (Races with * indicate most race laps led)

Year	Team	1	2	3	4	5	6	7	8	9	10	11	12	13	14	15	16	17	18	Rank	Points
2022	Velocity Racing Development	STP; 1; 13	STP; 2; 19	ALA; 1; 13	ALA; 2; 13	IMS; 1; 11	IMS; 2; 17	IMS; 3; 16	IRP; 1	ROA; 1; 18	ROA; 2; 15	MOH; 1; 11	MOH; 2; 13	MOH; 3; 12	TOR; 1	TOR; 2	POR; 1	POR; 2	POR; 3	19th	81

=== Complete TCR Europe Touring Car Series results ===
(key) (Races in bold indicate pole position) (Races in italics indicate fastest lap)

Year	Team	Car	1	2	3	4	5	6	7	8	9	10	11	12	13	14	DC	Points
2023	MA:GP	Lynk & Co 03 TCR	ALG; 1; 21†^{6}	ALG; 2; 14	**PAU**; **1** Ret^{1}	PAU; 2; 5	SPA; 1; 17	SPA; 2; 22	**HUN**; **1**; 20^{1}	HUN; 2; 13	LEC; 1; 10	LEC; 2; 11	MNZ; 1; 8^{7}	MNZ; 2; 4	CAT; 1; 5^{5}	CAT; 2; 3	5th	247
2024	MA:GP	Lynk & Co 03 TCR	VAL; 1; 12	VAL; 2; 4	ZOL; 1; 6^{6}	ZOL; 2; 9	SAL; 1; 11^{3}	SAL; 2; 8	SPA; 1; 12^{6}	SPA; 2; 2	BRN; 1; 4^{3}	BRN; 2; 3	CRT; 1 Ret^{3}	CRT; 2; 8			7th	232
2025	MA:GP	Lynk & Co 03 TCR	ALG; 1; 7	ALG; 2; 6	SPA; 1; 14	SPA; 2; 3	HOC; 1; 12	HOC; 2; 16	MIS; 1; 7^{5}	MIS; 2; 8	RBR; 1; 8	RBR; 2 Ret	CAT; 1; 5	CAT; 2; 9			11th	129
2026	Monlau Motorsport	Cupra León VZ TCR	ALG; 1; 12	ALG; 2; 6	SPA; 1; 2	SPA; 2; 12	**LEC**; **1**; 2	LEC; 2; 15	HUN; 1; 3	HUN; 2; 4	MNZ; 1; 5	MNZ; 2 Ret	CAT; 1; 3	CAT; 2 Ret			5th	173

^{†} Driver did not finish the race, but was classified as he completed over 90% of the race distance.

=== Complete TCR Spain results ===
(key) (Races in bold indicate pole position) (Races in italics indicate fastest lap)

Year	Team	Car	1	2	3	4	5	6	7	8	9	10	DC	Points
2026	Monlau Motorsport	Cupra León VZ TCR	**JAR**; **1**; 1	JAR; 2; 3	**LEC**; **1**; 3	LEC; 2; 3	CRT; 1; 1	CRT; 2; 1	NAV; 1	NAV; 2	CAT; 1	CAT; 2	1st*	184*

^{*} Season still in progress.

=== Complete TCR World Tour results ===
(key) (Races in bold indicate pole position) (Races in italics indicate fastest lap)

Year	Team	Car	1	2	3	4	5	6	7	8	9	10	11	12	13	14	15	16	17	18	19	20	21	DC	Points
2023	MA:GP	Lynk & Co 03 TCR	ALG; 1; 21†	ALG; 2; 14	SPA; 1; 17	SPA; 2; 22	VAL; 1	VAL; 2	HUN; 1; 20	HUN; 2; 13	ELP; 1	ELP; 2	VIL; 1	VIL; 2	SYD; 1	SYD; 2	SYD; 3	BAT; 1	BAT; 2	BAT; 3	MAC; 1	MAC; 2		48th	5
2025	MA:GP	Lynk & Co 03 TCR	AHR; 1	AHR; 2	AHR; 3	CRT; 1; 11	CRT; 2; 13	CRT; 3; 12	MNZ; 1; 9	MNZ; 2; 14	CVR; 1 NC	CVR; 2; 11	BEN; 1	BEN; 2	BEN; 3	INJ; 1	INJ; 2	INJ; 3	ZHZ; 1	ZHZ; 2	ZHZ; 3	MAC; 1	MAC; 2	20th	31
2026	Monlau Motorsport	Cupra León VZ TCR	MIS; 1; 11	MIS; 2 Ret	CRT; 1; 5	CRT; 2; 8	CRT; 3; 6	LEC; 1	LEC; 2															9th*	150*
2026	SP Compétition	Cupra León VZ TCR								CVR; 1; 7	CVR; 2; 3	INJ; 1; 7	INJ; 2; 1	INJ; 3; 6	CHE; 1	CHE; 2	CHE; 3	ZHZ; 1	ZHZ; 2	ZHZ; 3	MAC; 1	MAC; 2		9th*	150*

^{†} Driver did not finish the race, but was classified as he completed over 90% of the race distance. ^{*} Season still in progress.
