= 2026 GT Cup Open Europe =

Sports car racing competition

The 2026 GT Cup Open Europe was the eighth season of the GT Cup Open Europe, the grand tourer-style sports car racing series founded by the Spanish GT Sport Organización. It began on 18 April at the Algarve International Circuit and finished at the Circuit de Barcelona-Catalunya on 25 October after six rounds.

== Calendar ==
The calendar was announced on 25 August 2025.

Round		Circuit	Date	Support bill	Map of circuit locations
1	R1	(Portugal) Algarve International Circuit, Portimão	18–19 April	International GT Open; Euroformula Open Championship	2026 GT Cup Open Europe is located in Europe
1	R2	(Portugal) Algarve International Circuit, Portimão	18–19 April	International GT Open; Euroformula Open Championship	2026 GT Cup Open Europe is located in Europe
2	R1	(Belgium) Circuit de Spa-Francorchamps, Stavelot	16–17 May	International GT Open; Porsche Carrera Cup Germany; Euroformula Open Championship; TCR Europe Touring Car Series	2026 GT Cup Open Europe is located in Europe
2	R2	(Belgium) Circuit de Spa-Francorchamps, Stavelot	16–17 May	International GT Open; Porsche Carrera Cup Germany; Euroformula Open Championship; TCR Europe Touring Car Series	2026 GT Cup Open Europe is located in Europe
3	R1	(Italy) Misano World Circuit Marco Simoncelli, Misano	6–7 June	International GT Open; Euroformula Open Championship; SuperSport Series GT	2026 GT Cup Open Europe is located in Europe
3	R2	(Italy) Misano World Circuit Marco Simoncelli, Misano	6–7 June	International GT Open; Euroformula Open Championship; SuperSport Series GT	2026 GT Cup Open Europe is located in Europe
4	R1	(France) Circuit Paul Ricard, Le Castellet	18–19 July	International GT Open; Formula Regional European Championship; Euroformula Open Championship; E4 Championship	2026 GT Cup Open Europe is located in Europe
4	R2	(France) Circuit Paul Ricard, Le Castellet	18–19 July	International GT Open; Formula Regional European Championship; Euroformula Open Championship; E4 Championship	2026 GT Cup Open Europe is located in Europe
5		(Italy) Autodromo Nazionale di Monza, Monza	26–27 September	International GT Open; Euroformula Open Championship; TCR Europe Touring Car Series; Lotus Cup Italia	2026 GT Cup Open Europe is located in Europe
6	R1	(Spain) Circuit de Barcelona-Catalunya, Montmeló	24–25 October	International GT Open; Euroformula Open Championship; TCR Europe Touring Car Series	2026 GT Cup Open Europe is located in Europe
6	R2	(Spain) Circuit de Barcelona-Catalunya, Montmeló	24–25 October	International GT Open; Euroformula Open Championship; TCR Europe Touring Car Series	2026 GT Cup Open Europe is located in Europe

== Entry list ==
Team	Car	No.	Drivers	Class	Rounds
(Italy) FAEMS Team by Ebimotors	Porsche 911 GT3 Cup (992.1)	1	(Italy) Pietro Delli Guanti	S	All
(Italy) FAEMS Team by Ebimotors	Porsche 911 GT3 Cup (992.1)	1	(Italy) Matteo Luvisi	S	All
(Italy) FAEMS Team by Ebimotors	Porsche 911 GT3 Cup (992.1)	27	(Italy) Matteo Martinelli	S	All
(Italy) FAEMS Team by Ebimotors	Porsche 911 GT3 Cup (992.1)	27	(Italy) Giacomo Pedrini	S	All
(Italy) BiRace Motorsport	Porsche 911 GT3 Cup (992.1)	3	(Italy) Paolo Calgano	PA	5–6
(Italy) BiRace Motorsport	Porsche 911 GT3 Cup (992.1)	3	(Italy) Giovanni Stefanin	PA	5
(Italy) BiRace Motorsport	Porsche 911 GT3 Cup (992.1)	3	(Italy) Andrea Galli	PA	6
(Italy) BiRace Motorsport	Porsche 911 GT3 Cup (992.1)	4	(Italy) Diego Stifter Torío	S	All
(Italy) BiRace Motorsport	Porsche 911 GT3 Cup (992.1)	4	(Italy) Lodovico Laurini	S	1–5
(Netherlands) Hans Weijs Motorsport	Porsche 911 GT3 Cup (992.1)	5	(Netherlands) Hans Weijs	Am	All
(Netherlands) Hans Weijs Motorsport	Porsche 911 GT3 Cup (992.1)	5	(Netherlands) Rick van Zijverden	Am	All
(Netherlands) Hans Weijs Motorsport	Porsche 911 GT3 Cup (992.1)	6	(Philippines) Fgani Eugenio Salubre	PA	All
(Netherlands) Hans Weijs Motorsport	Porsche 911 GT3 Cup (992.1)	6	(Belgium) Lars Zaenen	PA	1–5
(Netherlands) Hans Weijs Motorsport	Porsche 911 GT3 Cup (992.1)	6	(Belgium) Nicolas Vandierendonck	PA	6
(Netherlands) Hans Weijs Motorsport	Porsche 911 GT3 Cup (992.1)	7	(Netherlands) Jurriann de Back	S	All
(Netherlands) Hans Weijs Motorsport	Porsche 911 GT3 Cup (992.1)	7	(Netherlands) Paul Meijer	S	All
(Italy) Scuderia Villorba Corse	Lamborghini Huracán Super Trofeo Evo 2	8	(San Marino) Luciano Privitelio	Am	1
(Italy) Scuderia Villorba Corse	Lamborghini Huracán Super Trofeo Evo 2	119	(Italy) Michele Merendino	Am	1
(Italy) Scuderia Villorba Corse	Lamborghini Huracán Super Trofeo Evo 2	119	(United Kingdom) Mark Stansfield	Am	1
(Portugal) AF Motorsport	Porsche 911 GT3 Cup (992.1)	10	(Brazil) Pipo Massa	PA	1
(Portugal) AF Motorsport	Porsche 911 GT3 Cup (992.1)	10	(Brazil) Léo Reis	PA	1
(Portugal) AF Motorsport	Porsche 911 GT3 Cup (992.1)	39	(Brazil) Luiz Souza	Am	5
(Portugal) AF Motorsport	Porsche 911 GT3 Cup (992.1)	77	(Portugal) José Barros	S	1–4
(Portugal) LMR Motorsport	Porsche 911 GT3 Cup (992.1)	11	(Portugal) Bernardo Lucas Pinheiro	PA	All
(Portugal) LMR Motorsport	Porsche 911 GT3 Cup (992.1)	11	(Brazil) Flávio Sampaio	PA	All
(Portugal) LMR Motorsport	Porsche 911 GT3 Cup (992.1)	911	(Brazil) Leandro Martins	Am	All
(Portugal) LMR Motorsport	Porsche 911 GT3 Cup (992.1)	911	(Austria) Dieter Svepes	Am	All
(Spain) GT Corse	Porsche 911 GT3 Cup (992.1)	14	(Spain) Alejandro Barambio	PA	All
(Spain) GT Corse	Porsche 911 GT3 Cup (992.1)	14	(Spain) Borja García	PA	All
(Spain) Volcano Motorsport	Porsche 911 GT3 Cup (992.1)	16	Evgenii Leonov	Am	2–4, 6
(Italy) Target Racing	Ferrari 296 Challenge	18	(Italy) Pierluigi Alessandri	Am	3
(San Marino) Tsunami RT	Porsche 911 GT3 Cup (992.1)	19	(Spain) Fernando Navarrete	Am	All
(San Marino) Tsunami RT	Porsche 911 GT3 Cup (992.1)	19	(Spain) Fernando Pedrera Martínez	Am	All
(San Marino) Tsunami RT	Porsche 911 GT3 Cup (992.1)	78	(Italy) Fabio Babini	PA	3–6
(San Marino) Tsunami RT	Porsche 911 GT3 Cup (992.1)	78	(Italy) Davide Scannicchio	PA	3–6
(San Marino) Tsunami RT	Porsche 911 GT3 Cup (992.1)	83	(Ukraine) Andrii Yefimenko	Am	6
(Romania) RO1 Racing	Porsche 911 GT3 Cup (992.1)	21	(Romania) Camil Perian	PA	1
(Romania) RO1 Racing	Porsche 911 GT3 Cup (992.1)	21	(Romania) Florin Tincescu	PA	1
(Italy) ZRS Motorsport	Porsche 911 GT3 Cup (992.1)	22	(Italy) Ludovico Longoni	S	All
(Italy) ZRS Motorsport	Porsche 911 GT3 Cup (992.1)	22	(Italy) Niccolò Schirò	S	1
(Italy) ZRS Motorsport	Porsche 911 GT3 Cup (992.1)	22	(Italy) Simone Iaquinta	S	2–5
(Italy) ZRS Motorsport	Porsche 911 GT3 Cup (992.1)	22	(Switzerland) Noah Massa	S	6
(Estonia) EST 1 Racing	Porsche 911 GT3 Cup (992.1)	28	(Estonia) Keijo Kaasik	PA	6
(Estonia) EST 1 Racing	Porsche 911 GT3 Cup (992.1)	28	(Estonia) Alex Reimann	PA	6
(Estonia) EST 1 Racing	Porsche 911 GT3 Cup (992.1)	91	(Venezuela) Javier Ripoll Jr	Am	6
(Slovakia) Lema Racing	Porsche 911 GT3 Cup (992.1)	42	(Italy) Emanuele Romani	PA	5
(Slovakia) Lema Racing	Porsche 911 GT3 Cup (992.1)	42	(Italy) Marco Squillaci	PA	5
(San Marino) Cássio by GDL Racing	Porsche 911 GT3 Cup (992.1)	44	(Italy) Giacomo Giubergia	Am	All
(San Marino) Cássio by GDL Racing	Porsche 911 GT3 Cup (992.1)	44	(Brazil) Cássio H. de Mello	Am	All
(San Marino) Monteiro by GDL Racing	Porsche 911 GT3 Cup (992.1)	87	(Brazil) Nelson Marcondes	Am	All
(San Marino) Monteiro by GDL Racing	Porsche 911 GT3 Cup (992.1)	87	(Brazil) Nelson Monteiro Jr.	Am	All
(Italy) SP Racing Team	Porsche 911 GT3 Cup (992.1)	55	(Italy) Stefano Zerbi	PA	3, 5
(Italy) SP Racing Team	Porsche 911 GT3 Cup (992.1)	55	(Argentina) Matías Russo	PA	3
(Italy) SP Racing Team	Porsche 911 GT3 Cup (992.1)	55	(Italy) Eugenio Pisani	PA	5
(France) Vic´Team	Porsche 911 GT3 Cup (992.1)	64	(France) Olivier Jouffret	PA	6
(France) Vic´Team	Porsche 911 GT3 Cup (992.1)	64	(France) Eric Tremoulet	PA	6
(Italy) Pellin Racing	Ferrari 296 Challenge	67	(United States) Mitchell Green	Am	6
(Italy) Zanasi Racing	Ferrari 296 Challenge	69	(Italy) Andrea Belicchi	PA	3
(Italy) Zanasi Racing	Ferrari 296 Challenge	69	(Italy) Marco Zanasi	PA	3
(Spain) GOAT Racing	Ferrari 296 Challenge	74	(Spain) Rubén Fernández	PA	6
(Spain) GOAT Racing	Ferrari 296 Challenge	74	(Spain) Pepe Oriola	PA	6
(Italy) Ebimotors	Porsche 911 GT3 Cup (992.1)	75	(Italy) Andrea Galli	PA	4
(Italy) Ebimotors	Porsche 911 GT3 Cup (992.1)	75	(Guatemala) Ian Rodríguez	PA	4
(Germany) Leipert Motorsport	Lamborghini Huracán Super Trofeo Evo 2	88	(Sweden) Axel Bengtsson	S	5
(Germany) Leipert Motorsport	Lamborghini Huracán Super Trofeo Evo 2	88	(United States) Barrett Wolfe	S	5
(Italy) AF Corse	Ferrari 296 Challenge	102	(United States) Jonny Kamiskey	S	6
(Italy) AF Corse	Ferrari 296 Challenge	175	(Italy) Andrea Gagliardini	Am	6
(Italy) AF Corse	Ferrari 296 Challenge	175	(Germany) Sven Schömer	Am	6
(Italy) Scuderia EMME	Ferrari 488 Challenge Evo	161	(Italy) Alessandro Marchetti	Am	5
(Italy) Scuderia EMME	Ferrari 488 Challenge Evo	161	(Italy) Maia Meneghin	Am	5
(France) Stéphane Perrin	Porsche 911 GT3 Cup (992.1)	888	(Andorra) Enzo Joulié	PA	4
(France) Stéphane Perrin	Porsche 911 GT3 Cup (992.1)	888	(France) Stéphane Perrin	PA	4

Icon	Class
S	Silver Cup
PA	Pro-Am Cup
Am	Am Cup

== Race results ==
Bold indicates overall winner.

Round		Circuit	Pole position	Pro-Am Winner	Silver Winner	Am Winner
1	R1	(Portugal) Algarve International Circuit	(Netherlands) No. 7 Hans Weijs Motorsport	(Spain) No. 14 GT Corse	**(Italy) No. 1 FAEMS Team by Ebimotors**	(San Marino) No. 19 Tsunami RT
1	R1	(Portugal) Algarve International Circuit	(Netherlands) Jurriann de Back (Netherlands) Paul Meijer	(Spain) Alejandro Barambio (Spain) Borja García	**(Italy) Pietro Delli Guanti** **(Italy) Matteo Luvisi**	(Spain) Fernando Navarrete (Spain) Fernando Pedrera Martínez
1	R2	(Portugal) Algarve International Circuit	(Italy) No. 1 FAEMS Team by Ebimotors	(Netherlands) No. 6 Hans Weijs Motorsport	**(Netherlands) No. 7 Hans Weijs Motorsport**	(San Marino) No. 44 Cássio by GDL Racing
1	R2	(Portugal) Algarve International Circuit	(Italy) Pietro Delli Guanti (Italy) Matteo Luvisi	(Philippines) Fgani Eugenio Salubre (Belgium) Lars Zaenen	**(Netherlands) Jurriann de Back** **(Netherlands) Paul Meijer**	(Italy) Giacomo Giubergia (Brazil) Cássio H. de Mello
2	R1	(Belgium) Circuit de Spa-Francorchamps	(Netherlands) No. 7 Hans Weijs Motorsport	(Spain) No. 14 GT Corse	**(Netherlands) No. 7 Hans Weijs Motorsport**	(Netherlands) No. 5 Hans Weijs Motorsport
2	R1	(Belgium) Circuit de Spa-Francorchamps	(Netherlands) Jurriann de Back (Netherlands) Paul Meijer	(Spain) Alejandro Barambio (Spain) Borja García	**(Netherlands) Jurriann de Back** **(Netherlands) Paul Meijer**	(Netherlands) Hans Weijs (Netherlands) Rick van Zijverden
2	R2	(Belgium) Circuit de Spa-Francorchamps	(Italy) No. 1 FAEMS Team by Ebimotors	(Spain) No. 14 GT Corse	**(Italy) No. 1 FAEMS Team by Ebimotors**	(Netherlands) No. 5 Hans Weijs Motorsport
2	R2	(Belgium) Circuit de Spa-Francorchamps	(Italy) Pietro Delli Guanti (Italy) Matteo Luvisi	(Spain) Alejandro Barambio (Spain) Borja García	**(Italy) Pietro Delli Guanti** **(Italy) Matteo Luvisi**	(Netherlands) Hans Weijs (Netherlands) Rick van Zijverden
3	R1	(Italy) Misano World Circuit Marco Simoncelli	(Italy) No. 22 ZRS Motorsport	(Italy) No. 69 Zanasi Racing	**(Italy) No. 22 ZRS Motorsport**	(Portugal) No. 911 LMR Motorsport
3	R1	(Italy) Misano World Circuit Marco Simoncelli	(Italy) Ludovico Longoni (Italy) Simone Iaquinta	(Italy) Andreo Belicchi (Italy) Marco Zanasi	**(Italy) Ludovico Longoni** **(Italy) Simone Iaquinta**	(Brazil) Leandro Martins (Austria) Dieter Svepes
3	R2	(Italy) Misano World Circuit Marco Simoncelli	(Italy) No. 1 FAEMS Team by Ebimotors	(Netherlands) No. 6 Hans Weijs Motorsport	**(Italy) No. 22 ZRS Motorsport**	(Spain) No. 16 Volcano Motorsport
3	R2	(Italy) Misano World Circuit Marco Simoncelli	(Italy) Pietro Delli Guanti (Italy) Matteo Luvisi	(Philippines) Fgani Eugenio Salubre (Belgium) Lars Zaenen	**(Italy) Ludovico Longoni** **(Italy) Simone Iaquinta**	Evgenii Leonov
4	R1	(France) Circuit Paul Ricard	(Netherlands) No. 7 Hans Weijs Motorsport	(Italy) No. 75 Ebimotors	**(Netherlands) No. 7 Hans Weijs Motorsport**	(Portugal) No. 911 LMR Motorsport
4	R1	(France) Circuit Paul Ricard	(Netherlands) Jurriann de Back (Netherlands) Paul Meijer	(Italy) Andrea Galli (Guatemala) Ian Rodríguez	**(Netherlands) Jurriann de Back** **(Netherlands) Paul Meijer**	(Brazil) Leandro Martins (Austria) Dieter Svepes
4	R2	(France) Circuit Paul Ricard	(Italy) No. 1 FAEMS Team by Ebimotors	(Spain) No. 14 GT Corse	**(Italy) No. 1 FAEMS Team by Ebimotors**	(San Marino) No. 19 Tsunami RT
4	R2	(France) Circuit Paul Ricard	(Italy) Pietro Delli Guanti (Italy) Matteo Luvisi	(Spain) Alejandro Barambio (Spain) Borja García	**(Italy) Pietro Delli Guanti** **(Italy) Matteo Luvisi**	(Spain) Fernando Navarrete (Spain) Fernando Pedrera Martínez
5	R1	(Italy) Autodromo Nazionale di Monza				
5	R2	(Italy) Autodromo Nazionale di Monza				
6	R1	(Spain) Circuit de Barcelona-Catalunya				
6	R2	(Spain) Circuit de Barcelona-Catalunya				

== Championship standings ==
source:
