= 2018 Formula STCC Nordic =

Motor racing championship held in 2018

The 2018 Formula STCC Nordic season was the sixth season of the single-seater championship supporting the Scandinavian Touring Car Championship. The series uses the previous Formula Renault 1.6 chassis and engines, as it used to go under the name of Formula Renault 1.6 Nordic before Renault Sport dropped its support for the 3.5 and 1.6 classes in late 2015. The season began on 4 May at Ring Knutstorp and concluded on 22 September at Mantorp Park after six double-header rounds.

== Drivers and teams ==
Team	No	Drivers	Rounds
(Norway) Team Greenpower	11	(Norway) Emil Heyerdahl	All
(Norway) Team Greenpower	14	(Norway) Edward Sander Woldseth	All
(Norway) Team Greenpower	18	(Norway) Lars Solheim	All
(Sweden) Tornfrakt Racing	17	(Sweden) William Winsth	All
(Sweden) Tornfrakt Racing	38	(Sweden) Simon Ohlin	All
(Sweden) MA:GP	20	(Sweden) Viktor Andersson	All
(Sweden) Ward WestCoast Racing Junior Team	46	(Sweden) Sebastian Persson	All
(Sweden) Ward WestCoast Racing Junior Team	97	(Sweden) Alfred Nilsson	All

== Race calendar and results ==
The season started on 4 May at Ring Knutstorp and finished on 22 September at Mantorp Park after six double-header rounds. Five of the six rounds supported STCC, the exception being the first Rudskogen round which was co-headlined alongside Porsche Carrera Cup Scandinavia, another STCC supporting series.

Round		Circuit	Date	Pole position	Fastest lap	Winning driver
1	R1	(Sweden) Ring Knutstorp, Kågeröd	5 May	(Norway) Emil Heyerdahl	(Sweden) Simon Ohlin	(Sweden) Alfred Nilsson
1	R2	(Sweden) Ring Knutstorp, Kågeröd	5 May	(Norway) Emil Heyerdahl	(Sweden) Simon Ohlin	(Norway) Emil Heyerdahl
2	R1	(Norway) Rudskogen, Rakkestad	19 May	(Norway) Emil Heyerdahl	(Norway) Edward Sander Woldseth	(Norway) Emil Heyerdahl
2	R2	(Norway) Rudskogen, Rakkestad	19 May	(Norway) Emil Heyerdahl	(Norway) Emil Heyerdahl	(Norway) Emil Heyerdahl
3	R1	(Sweden) Anderstorp Raceway, Anderstorp	16 June	(Sweden) Simon Ohlin	(Norway) Edward Sander Woldseth	(Norway) Edward Sander Woldseth
3	R2	(Sweden) Anderstorp Raceway, Anderstorp	17 June	(Sweden) Simon Ohlin	(Sweden) Simon Ohlin	(Sweden) Simon Ohlin
4	R1	(Sweden) Falkenbergs Motorbana, Bergagård	7 July	(Norway) Edward Sander Woldseth	(Norway) Emil Heyerdahl	(Norway) Emil Heyerdahl
4	R2	(Sweden) Falkenbergs Motorbana, Bergagård	8 July	(Norway) Emil Heyerdahl	(Sweden) Simon Ohlin	(Norway) Emil Heyerdahl
5	R1	(Norway) Rudskogen, Rakkestad	8 September	(Norway) Emil Heyerdahl	(Norway) Emil Heyerdahl	(Norway) Emil Heyerdahl
5	R2	(Norway) Rudskogen, Rakkestad	9 September	(Norway) Emil Heyerdahl	(Norway) Emil Heyerdahl (Note: The race was red-flagged after four laps under the Safety Car due to bad weather. Whereas full points were awarded, Emil Heyerdahl was not credited with the fastest lap point as there were no green laps.)	(Norway) Emil Heyerdahl
6	R1	(Sweden) Mantorp Park, Mantorp	22 September	(Sweden) Viktor Andersson	(Sweden) Sebastian Persson	(Norway) Emil Heyerdahl
6	R2	(Sweden) Mantorp Park, Mantorp	22 September	(Sweden) Viktor Andersson	(Sweden) Sebastian Persson	(Sweden) Simon Ohlin

== Championship standings ==
Points system

Points are awarded to the top 10 classified finishers. An extra point is awarded for pole position and fastest lap for each race.

Position	**1st**	**2nd**	**3rd**	**4th**	**5th**	**6th**	**7th**	**8th**	**9th**	**10th**	**Pole**	**FL**
Points	25	18	15	12	10	8	6	4	2	1	1	1

Parallel to the main championship, two other championships are held: the Formula STCC Junior Svenskt Mästerskap (JSM) for drivers under 26 years old holding a Swedish driver license, and the Formula STCC Northern European Zone (NEZ) championship at selected rounds. Points to this last championship are awarded using the same system, with the sole exception of pole position and fastest lap not awarding points.

=== Formula STCC Drivers' Championship ===
Pos	Driver	KNU		RUD1		AND		FAL		RUD2		MAN		Pts
1	(Norway) Emil Heyerdahl	**2**	**1**	**1**	**1**	3	2	1	**1**	**1**	**1**	1	2	279
2	(Sweden) Simon Ohlin	3	3	3	2	**2**	**1**	2	2	3	4	3	1	215
3	(Norway) Edward Sander Woldseth	5	4	2	4	1	4	**7**	4	2	3	6	9	155
4	(Sweden) Sebastian Persson	4	6	5	5	8	3	3	3	4	5	2	3	146
5	(Sweden) Alfred Nilsson	1	2	4	3	4	5	4	6	5	6	DSQ	5	140
6	(Sweden) Viktor Andersson	6	7	8	7	7	7	DNS	7	8	2	**4**	**4**	90
7	(Norway) Lars Solheim	8	5	6	6	6	6	6	8	7	7	7	7	82
8	(Sweden) William Winsth	7	8	7	8	5	Ret	5	5	6	8	5	6	80
Pos	Driver	KNU		RUD1		AND		FAL		RUD2		MAN		Pts

Colour	Result
Gold	Winner
Silver	Second place
Bronze	Third place
Green	Points classification
Blue	Non-points classification
Blue	Non-classified finish (NC)
Purple	Retired, not classified (Ret)
Red	Did not qualify (DNQ)
Red	Did not pre-qualify (DNPQ)
Black	Disqualified (DSQ)
White	Did not start (DNS)
White	Withdrew (WD)
White	Race cancelled (C)
Blank	Did not practice (DNP)
Blank	Did not arrive (DNA)
Blank	Excluded (EX)

**Bold** – Pole
Italics – Fastest Lap
