= Andreas Bäckman =

Swedish racing driver (born 1995)

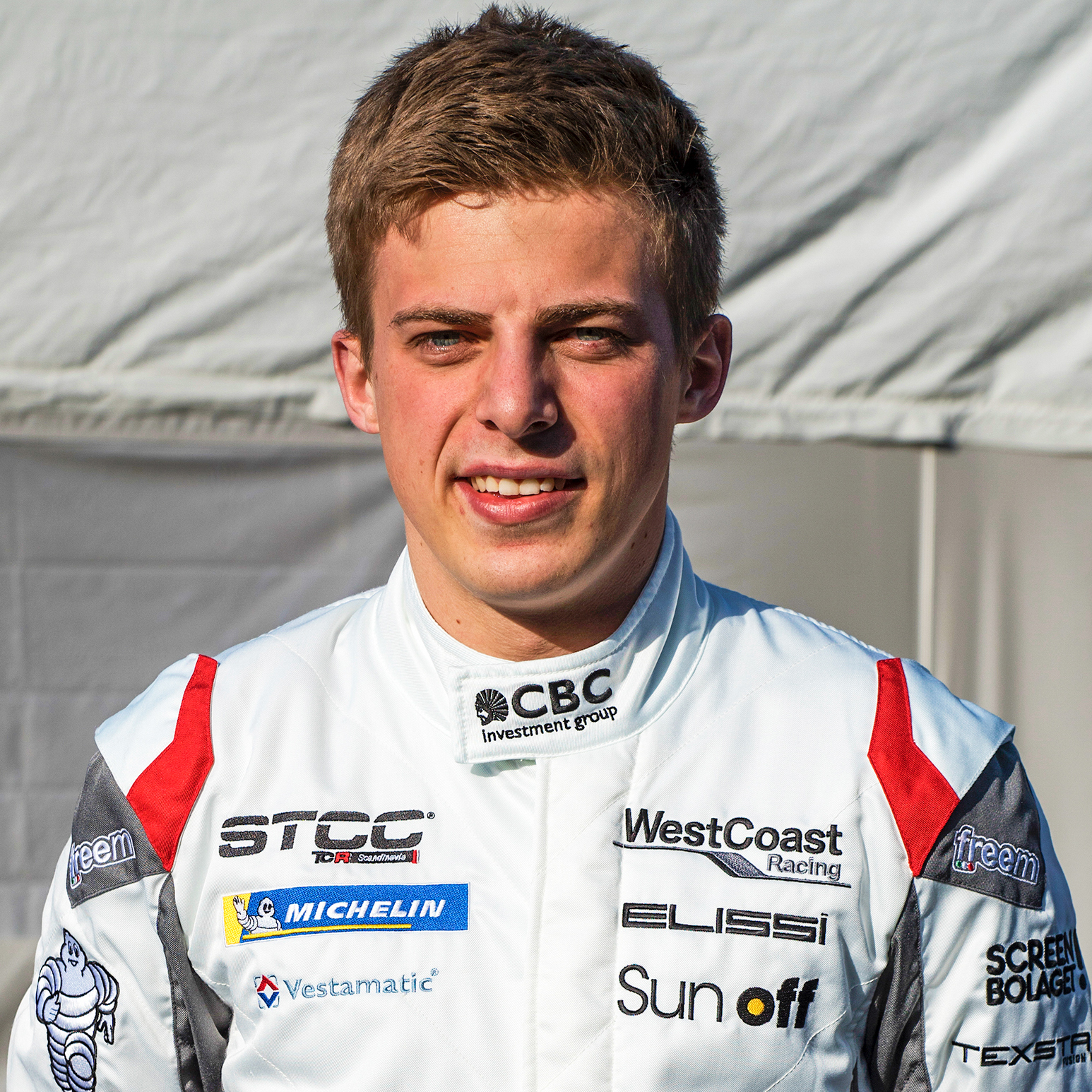
- Bäckman in 2018
- Nationality: (Sweden) Swedish
- Born: Jan Andreas William Bäckman; 29 August 1995 (age 31) Boden, Sweden
- Relatives: Jessica Bäckman (sister)
- Categorisation: FIA Silver

Jan Andreas William Bäckman (born 29 August 1995) is a Swedish racing driver who most recently competed in the GT4 European Series for racing one.

== Personal life ==
Bäckman is the brother of fellow racing driver Jessica Bäckman.

== Career ==
Bäckman began karting in 2006, competing until 2018. In his karting career, Bäckman most notably won the Rotax International Open in 2015 and 2016 in the DD2 class, as well as finishing second in the RMC Grand Finals in 2015.

Moving to cars in 2017, Bäckman competed in the RX2 International Series, before switching to TCR competition the following year by joining WestCoast Racing in both TCR Scandinavia and TCR UK. Scoring just eight points in the former, Bäckman found more success in the latter, scoring a lone win at Croft and five more podiums to secure third in points. During 2018, Bäckman also made one-off appearances in TCR Europe and TCR Ibérico for the same team.

Moving to TCR Europe full-time in 2019, Bäckman joined Target Competition for his second season in the category. In his maiden season in the series, Bäckman scored a lone win at Barcelona and a third-place finish at Spa as he ended the year fourth in points. During 2019, Bäckman also made one-off appearances in TCR Germany and TCR Ibérico for the same team. Remaining with Target for the following year's TCR Europe season, Bäckman took a lone win at Barcelona en route to a sixth-place points finish. During 2020, Bäckman also raced with the team in one-off appearances in both TCR Germany and TCR Ibérico. Continuing with Target to race in the World Touring Car Cup in 2021, Bäckman competed in the first four rounds, scoring a lone point at Algarve, before leaving the team and the series. Following that, Bäckman made a one-off appearance in the STCC TCR Scandinavia Touring Car Championship for Brink Motorsport at Mantorp Park, taking a best result of fifth in race three.

The following year, Bäckman joined Lestrup Racing Team to race full-time in the STCC TCR Scandinavia Touring Car Championship. In his second full-time season in the series, Bäckman began the year with a win at Fällfors, before taking two wins at Anderstorp and four more podiums to end the year third in points. During 2022, Bäckman also represented Sweden in the FIA Motorsport Games Touring Car Cup, as well as a one-off appearance in the 24H TCE Series at the Hockenheimring. In 2023, Bäckman joined Aston Martin-linked PROsport Racing to compete in both ADAC GT4 Germany and the GT4 European Series. After the first round in both series, Bäckman switched to racing one to continue in the latter, scoring a best result of 14th in race two at Barcelona.

== Karting record ==
=== Karting career summary ===
Season	Series	Team	Position
2006	Norrlandscupen – Formula Micro	Luleå MS	13th
2007	Norrlandscupen – Formula Micro	Luleå MS	7th
2007	Kristianstad KK Grande Finale — Mini		16th
2008	Norrlandscupen – Formula Mini	Luleå MS	12th
2009	MKR Series Sweden – Rotax Max Junior		4th
2009	Rotax Max Challenge Sweden – Junior		16th
2009	Swedish Karting Championship – KF3		9th
2009	Norrlandscupen – Rotax Max Junior	Luleå MS	19th
2009	Klippan Cup – KF3	Luleå MS	7th
2009	Göteborgs Stora Pris – KF3		20th
2009	Tom Trana Trophy – KF3		9th
2010	MKR Series Sweden – Rotax Max Junior	Luleå MS	15th
2010	Estonian Karting Championship – Rotax Junior		11th
2010	Rotax Max Challenge Sweden – Junior		10th
2010	Göteborgs Stora Pris – Rotax Max Junior		6th
2010	Norrlandscupen – Rotax Max		
2011	Estonian Karting Championship – Rotax Senior		9th
2011	Rotax Max Challenge Sweden – Senior		8th
2011	Trent Valley Kart Club — Senior Rotax		59th
2011	Norwegian Karting Championship — Rotax		18th
2011	Rotax Euro Challenge — Senior Max	Strawberry Racing	29th
2011	MKR Series Sweden – Rotax		24th
2011	Norrlandscupen – Rotax Max	Luleå MS	
2011	Kartmasters British GP — Rotax Senior		24th
2011	Tom Trana Trophy – Rotax		1st
2012	Rotax Max Wintercup — Senior	Strawberry Racing	33rd
2012	Kartmasters British GP — Rotax Senior	Strawberry Racing	16th
2012	Rotax International Open — Senior	Strawberry Racing	18th
2012	RMC Grand Finals — DD2	Strawberry Racing	14th
2012	Rotax Max Challenge Sweden – Senior		4th
2012	Super One Series — Rotax Max		18th
2012	Rotax Euro Challenge — Senior		30th
2013	Rotax Max Wintercup — DD2	Strawberry Racing	22nd
2013	Rotax Max Euro Challenge — Senior	Strawberry Racing	11th
2013	Swedish Karting Championship — KF2	Strawberry Racing	1st
2013	NEZ Karting Championship — KF2	Strawberry Racing	6th
2013	Super One Series — Senior		16th
2013	BNL Karting Series — DD2		3rd
2013	Rotax Max Challenge Sweden — Senior		24th
2013	DSKM German Shalt-Kart Championship		19th
2013	Rotax International Open — DD2		4th
2013	SKUSA SuperNationals — DD2		9th
2014	Rotax Max Wintercup — DD2		3rd
2014	WSK Champions Cup — KZ2	Kosmic Racing Department	29th
2014	DSKM German Shalt-Kart Championship	Kosmic Racing Department	NC
2014	Karting European Championship — KZ2	Kosmic Racing Department	49th
2014	Karting International Super Cup — KZ2	Kosmic Racing Department	23rd
2014	SKUSA SuperNationals — KZ2	Kosmic Racing Department	NC
2014	Rotax Max Euro Challenge — DD2	Strawberry Racing	3rd
2014	BNL Karting Series — DD2		3rd
2014	Swedish Karting Championship — KZ2		3rd
2014	RMC Grand Finals — DD2		NC
2015	South Garda Winter Cup — KZ2	Kosmic Racing Department	NC
2015	WSK Super Master Series — KZ2	Kosmic Racing Department	31st
2015	DSKM German Shalt-Kart Championship – KZ2	Kosmic Racing Department	15th
2015	Swedish Karting Championship — KZ2	Kosmic Racing Department	4th
2015	Karting European Championship — KZ	Kosmic Racing Department	18th
2015	Karting World Championship — KZ	Kosmic Racing Department	15th
2015	Rotax International Open — DD2	Daems Racing	1st
2015	RMC Grand Finals — DD2	Daems Racing	2nd
2015	Norrlandscupen – KZ2	Luleå MS	1st
2016	WSK Champions Cup — KZ	Kosmic Racing Department	12th
2016	South Garda Winter Cup — KZ2	Kosmic Racing Department	10th
2016	WSK Super Master Series — KZ	Kosmic Racing Department	19th
2016	Swedish Karting Championship — KZ2	Kosmic Racing Department	7th
2016	Karting European Championship — KZ	Kosmic Racing Department	21st
2016	DSKM German Shalt-Kart Championship – KZ2	Kosmic Racing Department	26th
2016	Karting World Championship — KZ	Kosmic Racing Department	21st
2016	Rotax International Open — DD2	Daems Racing	1st
2016	RMC Grand Finals — DD2	Daems Racing	28th
2016	Göteborgs Stora Pris — KZ2		NC
2017	Norrlandscupen – KZ2	Luleå MS	17th
2018	Göteborgs Stora Pris – KZ2		2nd

== Racing record ==
=== Racing career summary ===
Season	Series	Team	Races	Wins	Poles	F/Laps	Podiums	Points	Position
2017	FIA World Rallycross Championship – RX2	Olsbergs MSE	7	0	—N/a	—N/a	0	69	10th
2018	TCR Scandinavia Touring Car Championship	WestCoast Racing	10	0	0	0	0	8	14th
2018	TCR UK Touring Car Championship	WestCoast Racing	14	1	1	3	6	408	**3rd**
2018	TCR Europe Touring Car Series	WestCoast Racing	2	0	0	0	0	0	32nd
2018	TCR Ibérico Touring Car Series	WestCoast Racing	2	0	0	0	0	0	22nd
2019	TCR Europe Touring Car Series	Target Competition	14	1	2	1	2	218	4th
2019	TCR Ibérico Touring Car Series	Target Competition	2	1	1	0	1	26	10th
2019	ADAC TCR Germany Touring Car Championship	Target Competition	2	0	0	0	0	0	NC
2020	TCR Europe Touring Car Series	Target Competition	10	1	0	0	1	209	6th
2020	ADAC TCR Germany Touring Car Championship	Target Competition	2	0	0	0	1	0	NC
2020	TCR Ibérico Touring Car Series	Target Competition						31	6th
2021	World Touring Car Cup	Target srl	8	0	0	0	0	1	22nd
2021	STCC TCR Scandinavia Touring Car Championship	Brink Motorsport	3	0	1	0	0	22	17th
2022	STCC TCR Scandinavia Touring Car Championship	Lestrup Racing Team	16	3	2	3	7	222	**3rd**
2022	24H TCE Series – TCR	Lestrup Racing Team	1	0	0	0	1	0	NC
2022	FIA Motorsport Games Touring Car Cup	Team Sweden	1	0	0	0	0	—N/a	6th
2023	GT4 European Series – Silver	PROsport Racing	2	0	0	0	0	0	NC
2023	GT4 European Series – Silver	racing one	8	0	0	0	0	0	NC
2023	ADAC GT4 Germany	PROsport Racing	2	0	0	0	0	0	NC

=== Complete FIA World Rallycross Championship results ===
(key)

==== RX2 International Series ====
Year	Entrant	Car	1	2	3	4	5	6	7	RX2	Points
2017	Olsbergs MSE	RX2	BEL; 15	GBR; 14	NOR; 5	SWE; 4	CAN; 9	FRA; 12	RSA; 8	10th	69

=== Complete TCR UK Touring Car Championship results ===
(key) (Races in bold indicate pole position) (Races in italics indicate fastest lap)

Year	Team	Car	1	2	3	4	5	6	7	8	9	10	11	12	13	14	DC	Points
2018	WestCoast Racing	Volkswagen Golf GTI TCR	SIL; 1; 4^{8}	SIL; 2; 2	KNO; 1; 4^{4}	KNO; 2; 5	BHI; 1; 6^{3}	BHI; 2 Ret	CAS; 1; 3^{3}	CAS; 2; 4	OUL; 1; 3^{4}	OUL; 2; 8			DON; 1; 2^{2}	DON; 2; 4	3rd	408
2018	WestCoast Racing	Honda Civic Type R TCR (FK2)											**CRO**; **1**; 1^{1}	CRO; 2; 3			3rd	408

=== Complete Scandinavian Touring Car Championship results ===
(key) (Races in bold indicate pole position) (Races in italics indicate fastest lap)

Year	Team	Car	1	2	3	4	5	6	7	8	9	10	11	12	13	14	15	16	17	18	DC	Points
2018	WestCoast Racing	Volkswagen Golf GTI TCR	KNU; 1 Ret	KNU; 2; 16	AND; 1; 9	AND; 2; 8	FAL; 1; 10	FAL; 2; 11	KAR; 1; 15	KAR; 2; 14	RUD; 1	RUD; 2	MAN; 1; 14	MAN; 2; 10							14th	8
2021	Brink Motorsport	Audi RS3 LMS TCR	LJU; 1	LJU; 2	LJU; 3	SKE; 1	SKE; 2	SKE; 3	KAR; 1	KAR; 2	KAR; 3	AND; 1	AND; 2	AND; 3	MAN; 1; 10	**MAN**; **2** Ret^{1}	MAN; 3; 5	KNU; 1	KNU; 2	KNU; 3	17th	22
2022	Lestrup Racing Team	Audi RS 3 LMS TCR (2021)	LJU; 1; 5	SKE; 1; 1	SKE; 2; 5^{2}	SKE; 3; 12	KNU; 1; 4	KNU; 2; 4^{2}	KNU; 3; 2	KAR; 1; 3	KAR; 2; 5	KAR; 3; 2	AND; 1; 1	**AND**; **2**; 1^{1}	AND; 3; 6	MAN; 1 Ret	MAN; 2; 6	MAN; 3; 2			3rd	222

=== Complete TCR Europe Touring Car Series results ===
(key) (Races in bold indicate pole position) (Races in italics indicate fastest lap)

Year	Team	Car	1	2	3	4	5	6	7	8	9	10	11	12	13	14	DC	Points
2018	WestCoast Racing	Volkswagen Golf GTI TCR	LEC; 1	LEC; 2	ZAN; 1	ZAN; 2	SPA; 1	SPA; 2	HUN; 1	HUN; 2	ASS; 1	ASS; 2	MNZ; 1	MNZ; 2	CAT; 1; 12	CAT; 2; 13	32nd	0
2019	Target Competition	Hyundai i30 N TCR	HUN; 1; 10^{2}	HUN; 2; 14	HOC; 1; 5^{5}	HOC; 2; 4	SPA; 1; 13	SPA; 2; 3	RBR; 1; 12	RBR; 2; 9	OSC; 1 DSQ	OSC; 2; 9	**CAT**; **1**; 1^{1}	CAT; 2; 10	MNZ; 1; 7	MNZ; 2; 15	4th	218
2020	Target Competition	Hyundai i30 N TCR	LEC; 1; 7^{8}	LEC; 2; 4	ZOL; 1 Ret^{8}	ZOL; 2 Ret	MNZ; 1 WD	MNZ; 2 WD	CAT; 1; 7^{10}	CAT; 2; 1	SPA; 1; 4^{4}	SPA; 2; 7	JAR; 1; 6^{6}	JAR; 2; 9			6th	209

=== Complete World Touring Car Cup results ===
(key) (Races in bold indicate pole position) (Races in italics indicate fastest lap)

Year	Team	Car	1	2	3	4	5	6	7	8	9	10	11	12	13	14	15	16	DC	Points
2021	Target srl	Hyundai Elantra N TCR	GER; 1; 20	GER; 2 Ret	POR; 1; 15	POR; 2; 17	ESP; 1; 16	ESP; 2 Ret	HUN; 1; 19	HUN; 2 Ret	CZE; 1	CZE; 2	FRA; 1	FRA; 2	ITA; 1	ITA; 2	RUS; 1	RUS; 2	22nd	1

=== Complete GT4 European Series results ===
(key) (Races in bold indicate pole position) (Races in italics indicate fastest lap)

Year	Team	Car	Class	1	2	3	4	5	6	7	8	9	10	11	12	Pos	Points
2023	PROsport Racing	Aston Martin Vantage AMR GT4	Silver	MNZ; 1; 16	MNZ; 2; 34											NC	0
2023	racing one	Aston Martin Vantage AMR GT4	Silver			LEC; 1 Ret	LEC; 2 WD	SPA; 1; 40	SPA; 2; 26	MIS; 1 Ret	MIS; 2; 22	HOC; 1; 26	HOC; 2 DNS	CAT; 1; 19	CAT; 2; 14	NC	0
