= Jessica Bäckman =

Swedish racing driver (born 1997)

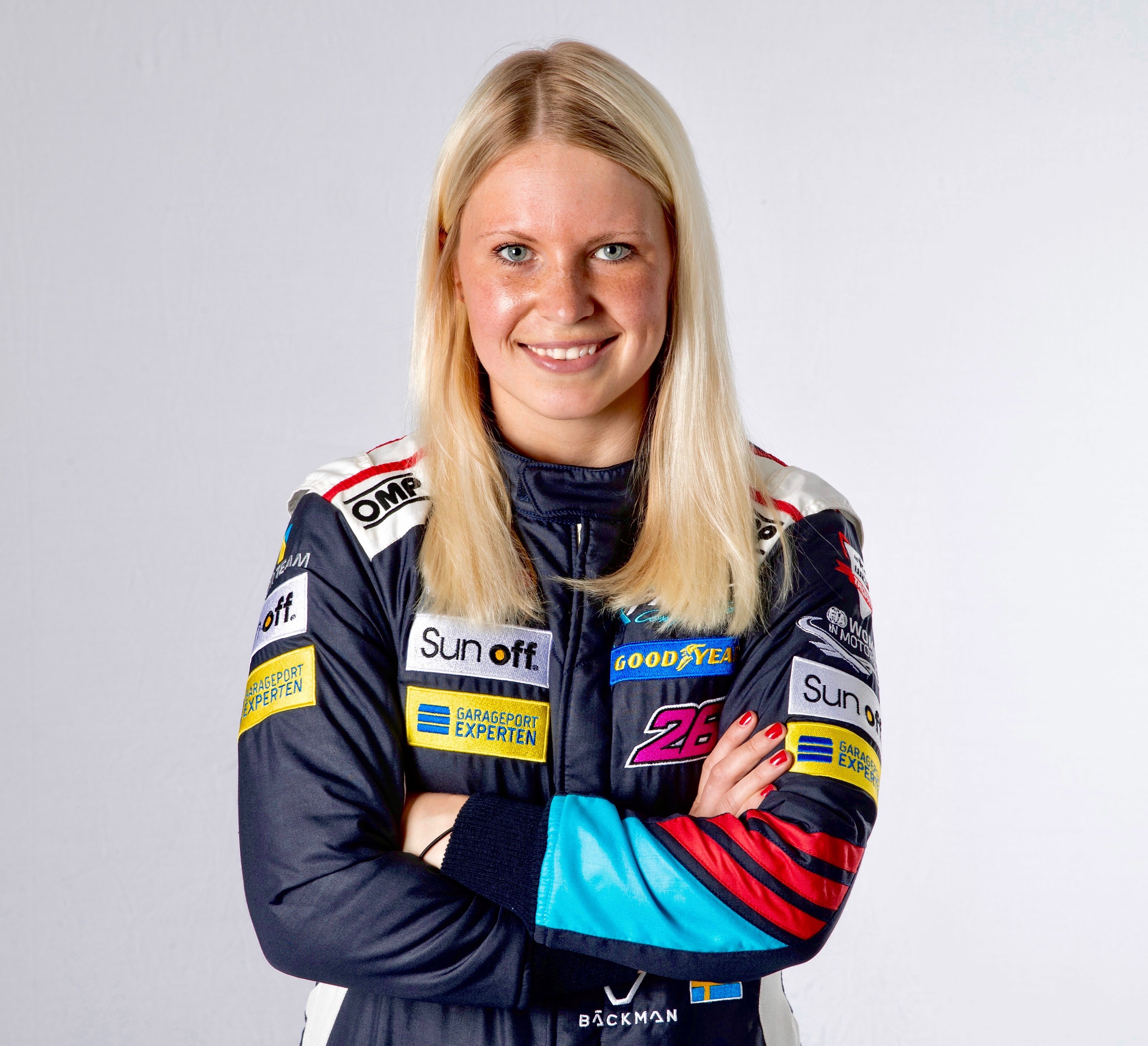
- Bäckman in 2021
- Nationality: (Sweden) Swedish
- Born: Jessica Sofia Elizabet Bäckman; 25 August 1997 (age 29) Boden, Sweden
- Relatives: Andreas Bäckman (brother)

GT4 European Series career
- Debut season: 2023
- Current team: racing one
- Categorisation: FIA Silver
- Car number: 19
- Former teams: Brink Motorsport, West Coast Racing, Hyundai Team Engstler, Target Competition, ROJA Motorsport, Comtoyou Racing
- Starts: 92
- Wins: 4
- Podiums: 14
- Poles: 2
- Fastest laps: 3
- Best finish: 1st in 2022

Previous series
- 2018-2021: FIA WTCR, TCR Europe, TCR UK, TCR Scandinavia, TCR Germany, FIA Motorsport Games, STCC

Jessica Sofia Elizabet Bäckman (born 25 August 1997) is a Swedish racing driver currently competing in the GT4 European Series for racing one. She is the sister of racing driver Andreas Bäckman. Bäckman has previously raced in World Touring Car Cup where she was the first women to achieve World Cup points in the series, and she was recently crowned the Vice Champion title in ADAC TCR Germany.

== Career ==
Bäckman started her motorsport career in kart racing in 2006. She mainly competed in championships in Sweden, including third place in both the North Swedish and National Championships in 2009. In 2012, she competed in international championships for the first time; she was the best placed woman in the world championship and fifth in the European championship. She also became national champion in the Junior class that year. In 2013, 2014 and 2015, she won races in the Belgian championship. In addition, in 2014, she finished second in the Swedish KF2 Championship and eighth in the German KF2 Championship. In 2016, she finished third in the overall Belgian championship and won the Swedish 125 championship.

In 2017, Bäckman made her debut in the FIA World Rallycross Championship and finished fourteenth in the RX2 class of the event in Norway. She also won the Swedish 125 Championship again and was the best woman in the Karting World Championship. In 2018, she moved into track racing with her entry into the TCR UK Touring Car Championship, competing alongside her brother for the WestCoast Racing team in a Volkswagen Golf GTI TCR. She took a podium place at Brands Hatch and was fourth in the final standings with 300 points. She also drove for WestCoast in five of the six race weekends of the Scandinavian Touring Car Championship. In this series, she had a more difficult season with a twelfth place on the Falkenbergs Motorbana as the best classification, so that she finished winless in eighteenth in the standings. At the end of the year, she competed in the final weekend of the TCR Europe Touring Car Series at the Circuit de Barcelona-Catalunya, finishing the races in 15th and 14th place.

In 2019, Bäckman competed in the full season of TCR Europe with the Target Competition team in a Hyundai i30 N TCR, again as her brother's teammate. She achieved a podium finish at the Hockenheimring and thus became nineteenth in the final standings with 70 points. She also drove in the ADAC TCR Germany Touring Car Championship as a guest driver during the race weekends at Autodrom Most and the Nürburgring. At Most, she only finished thirteenth and one dropout, while she finished seventh and second at the Nürburgring. She also took part in the race weekend at the STCC's Anderstorp Raceway, finishing seventh and third. At the end of the year she competed in the FIA Motorsport Games, finishing seventh in both races in the touring car class for her national team, thus finishing sixth overall.

In 2020, Bäckman achieved her best result in the TCR Europe with seventh place at the Autodromo Nazionale Monza, placing her in eighteenth place in the final standings with 60 points. In addition, she again took part in the race weekend at the Nürburgring of the ADAC TCR Germany as a guest driver. This time, she had to retire in the first race, but finished sixth in the second.

In 2021, Bäckman moved to the World Touring Car Cup, in which she will compete alongside her brother for Target Competition in a Hyundai Elantra N TCR. Jessica was the first women to complete a season in the World Touring Car Cup and was also the first women to achieve World Cup points in the series, as she finished 14th in the season opener at Nürburgring Nordschleife

In 2022, Bäckman raced in the ADAC TCR Germany Touring Car Championship with Comtoyou Racing in an Audi RS3 LMS TCR car. She finished the season as Vice Champion in ADAC TCR Germany Touring Car Championship with a total of four wins and nine podiums. This made her the first women to finish top-three in ADAC TCR Germany Touring Car Championship with her four wins.

== Racing record ==
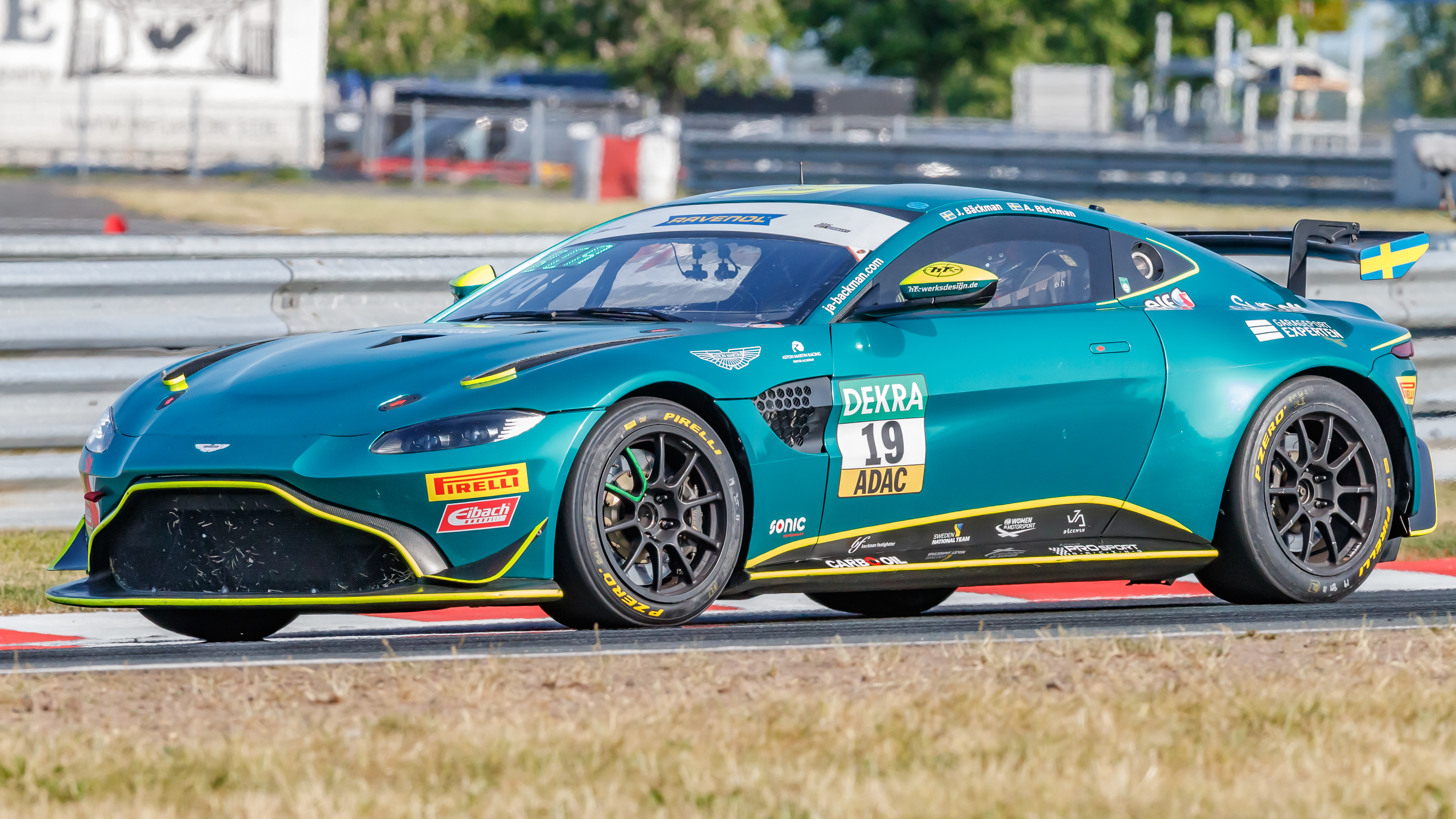
Bäckman competing in the 2023 ADAC GT4 Germany Oschersleben round.

=== Career summary ===
Season	Series	Team	Races	Wins	Poles	F/Laps	Podiums	Points	Position
2018	TCR UK Touring Car Championship	WestCoast Racing	14	0	0	0	1	300	4th
2018	TCR Scandinavia Touring Car Championship	WestCoast Racing	10	0	0	0	0	0	18th
2018	TCR Europe Touring Car Series	WestCoast Racing	2	0	0	0	0	0	37th
2019	TCR Europe Touring Car Series	Target Competition	14	0	0	0	1	70	19th
2019	TCR Scandinavia Touring Car Championship	Target Competition	2	0	0	0	1	21	11th
2019	ADAC TCR Germany Touring Car Championship	Hyundai Team Engstler	2	0	0	0	0	0	NC†
2019	ADAC TCR Germany Touring Car Championship	Target Competition	2	0	0	0	1	0	NC†
2019	FIA Motorsport Games Touring Car Cup	Team Sweden	2	0	0	0	0	15	6th
2020	TCR Europe Touring Car Series	Target Competition	12	0	0	0	0	60	18th
2020	ADAC TCR Germany Touring Car Championship	Target Competition	2	0	0	0	0	0	NC†
2021	World Touring Car Cup	Target srl	8	0	0	0	0	2	21st
2021	STCC TCR Scandinavia Touring Car Championship	Brink Motorsport	3	0	0	0	1	29	15th
2021	Nürburgring Endurance Series - VT2	ROJA Motorsport by ASL Lichtblau	2	0	0	0	0	?	?*
2022	ADAC TCR Germany Touring Car Championship	ROJA Motorsport by ASL Lichtblau	10	4	2	3	6	313	**2nd**
2022	ADAC TCR Germany Touring Car Championship	Comtoyou Racing	4	0	0	0	3	313	**2nd**
2023	GT4 European Series - Silver Cup	racing one	5	0	0	0	0	0*	NC*
2023	GT4 European Series - Silver Cup	PROsport Racing	2	0	0	0	0	0*	NC*
2023	ADAC GT4 Germany	PROsport Racing	2	0	0	0	0	0	NC

^{†} As Bäckman was a guest driver, she was ineligible to score points.

=== Complete TCR Europe Touring Car Series results ===
(key) (Races in bold indicate pole position) (Races in italics indicate fastest lap)

Year	Team	Car	1	2	3	4	5	6	7	8	9	10	11	12	13	14	DC	Points
2018	WestCoast Racing	Volkswagen Golf GTI TCR	LEC; 1	LEC; 2	ZAN; 1	ZAN; 2	SPA; 1	SPA; 2	HUN; 1	HUN; 2	ASS; 1	ASS; 2	MNZ; 1	MNZ; 2	CAT; 1; 15	CAT; 2; 14	37th	0
2019	Target Competition	Hyundai i30 N TCR	HUN; 1; 9	HUN; 2; 15	HOC; 1; 13	HOC; 2; 3	SPA; 1; 23	SPA; 2; 16	RBR; 1 Ret	RBR; 2; 23†	OSC; 1 Ret	OSC; 2; 6	CAT; 1; 16	CAT; 2; 27†	MNZ; 1; 26	MNZ; 2; 18	19th	70
2020	Target Competition	Hyundai i30 N TCR	LEC; 1; 21^{7}	LEC; 2; 8	ZOL; 1 Ret	ZOL; 2; 10	MNZ; 1; 7	MNZ; 2; 14	CAT; 1; 15^{9}	CAT; 2; 18	SPA; 1 Ret	SPA; 2; 14	JAR; 1 Ret^{8}	JAR; 2; 19			18th	60

^{†} Driver did not finish, but was classified as she completed over 90% of the race distance.

=== Complete World Touring Car Cup results ===
(key) (Races in bold indicate pole position) (Races in italics indicate fastest lap)

Year	Team	Car	1	2	3	4	5	6	7	8	9	10	11	12	13	14	15	16	DC	Points
2021	Target srl	Hyundai Elantra N TCR	GER; 1; 21	GER; 2; 14	POR; 1; 16	POR; 2; 16	ESP; 1; 19	ESP; 2; 17	HUN; 1; 20	HUN; 2; 21	CZE; 1	CZE; 2	FRA; 1	FRA; 2	ITA; 1	ITA; 2	RUS; 1	RUS; 2	21st	2

=== Complete ADAC TCR Germany results ===
(key) (Races in bold indicate pole position) (Races in italics indicate fastest lap)

Year	Team	Car	1	2	3	4	5	6	7	8	9	10	11	12	13	14	DC	Points
2022	Comtoyou Racing	Audi RS 3 LMS TCR	OSC; 1; 1	OSC; 2; 5	RED; 1; 1	RED; 2; 1	SAL; 1; 5	SAL; 2; 1	NUR; 1; 3	NUR; 2; 2	LAU; 1 Ret	LAU; 2; 8	SAC; 1; 3	SAC; 2; 2	HOC; 1; 11	HOC; 2; 2	2nd	313
