= 2021 World Touring Car Cup =

Motorsport contest

Champions
- Drivers' Champion: Yann Ehrlacher
- Teams' Champion: Cyan Racing Lynk & Co

Seasons
- ← 2020 2022 →

The 2021 World Touring Car Cup was the fourth season of the World Touring Car Cup and 17th overall of the series, which dates back to the 2005 World Touring Car Championship. The season began on 5 June at the Nürburgring and ended on 28 November in Sochi.

== Teams and drivers ==
| Team | Car | No. | Drivers | Class | Rounds | Ref. |
|---|---|---|---|---|---|---|
| (Italy) BRC Hyundai N Lukoil Squadra Corse | Hyundai Elantra N TCR | 3 | (Italy) Gabriele Tarquini | | All | |
| (Italy) BRC Hyundai N Lukoil Squadra Corse | Hyundai Elantra N TCR | 5 | (Hungary) Norbert Michelisz | | All | |
| (Germany) Engstler Hyundai N Liqui Moly Racing Team | Hyundai Elantra N TCR | 8 | (Germany) Luca Engstler | J | All | |
| (Germany) Engstler Hyundai N Liqui Moly Racing Team | Hyundai Elantra N TCR | 69 | (France) Jean-Karl Vernay | | All | |
| (Germany) ALL-INKL.DE Münnich Motorsport | Honda Civic Type R TCR (FK8) | 9 | (Hungary) Attila Tassi | | All | |
| (Germany) ALL-INKL.DE Münnich Motorsport | Honda Civic Type R TCR (FK8) | 18 | (Portugal) Tiago Monteiro | | All | |
| (Germany) ALL-INKL.COM Münnich Motorsport | Honda Civic Type R TCR (FK8) | 29 | (Argentina) Néstor Girolami | | All | |
| (Germany) ALL-INKL.COM Münnich Motorsport | Honda Civic Type R TCR (FK8) | 86 | (Argentina) Esteban Guerrieri | | All | |
| (Sweden) Cyan Performance Lynk & Co | Lynk & Co 03 TCR | 11 | (Sweden) Thed Björk | | All | |
| (Sweden) Cyan Performance Lynk & Co | Lynk & Co 03 TCR | 12 | (Uruguay) Santiago Urrutia | | All | |
| (Sweden) Cyan Racing Lynk & Co | Lynk & Co 03 TCR | 68 | (France) Yann Ehrlacher | | All | |
| (Sweden) Cyan Racing Lynk & Co | Lynk & Co 03 TCR | 100 | (France) Yvan Muller | | All | |
| (Belgium) Comtoyou Team Audi Sport | Audi RS 3 LMS TCR (2021) | 16 | (Belgium) Gilles Magnus | J T | All | |
| (Belgium) Comtoyou Team Audi Sport | Audi RS 3 LMS TCR (2021) | 22 | (Belgium) Frédéric Vervisch | | All | |
| (Belgium) Comtoyou DHL Team Audi Sport | Audi RS 3 LMS TCR (2021) | 17 | (France) Nathanaël Berthon | | All | |
| (Belgium) Comtoyou DHL Team Audi Sport | Audi RS 3 LMS TCR (2021) | 32 | (Netherlands) Tom Coronel | T | All | |
| (Italy) Target srl | Hyundai Elantra N TCR | 19 | (Sweden) Andreas Bäckman | T | 1–4 | |
| (Italy) Target srl | Hyundai Elantra N TCR | 26 | (Sweden) Jessica Bäckman | J T | 1–4 | |
| (Italy) Target srl | Hyundai Elantra N TCR | 82 | (Italy) Nicola Baldan | T | 7 | |
| (Hungary) Zengő Motorsport Drivers’ Academy | Cupra León Competición TCR | 28 | (Spain) Jordi Gené | | All | |
| (Hungary) Zengő Motorsport Drivers’ Academy | Cupra León Competición TCR | 55 | (Hungary) Bence Boldizs | J T | All | |
| (Hungary) Zengő Motorsport Services KFT | Cupra León Competición TCR | 79 | (United Kingdom) Robert Huff | | All | |
| (Hungary) Zengő Motorsport Services KFT | Cupra León Competición TCR | 96 | (Spain) Mikel Azcona | | All | |
Wildcard entries
| (Russia) Rosneft Lada Sport | Lada Vesta Sport TCR | 20 | (Russia) Kirill Ladygin | | 8 | |
| (Russia) Rosneft Lada Sport | Lada Vesta Sport TCR | 30 | (Russia) Mikhail Mityaev | | 8 | |
| (Italy) Target srl | Hyundai Elantra N TCR | 82 | (Italy) Nicola Baldan | | 4 | |
| (Czech Republic) Full In Race Academy | Cupra León Competición TCR | 222 | (Czech Republic) Petr Fulín | | 5 | |

| Icon | Class |
|---|---|
| J | Eligible for FIA WTCR Junior Driver Title |
| T | Eligible for WTCR Trophy |

=== Summary ===
JAS Motorsport and Honda Racing retained their 2020 drivers – Attila Tassi, Tiago Monteiro, Néstor Girolami and Esteban Guerrieri – for the 2021 season. On 15 January it was announced that all four drivers would continue to compete for Münnich Motorsport and announced that Attila Tassi and Tiago Monteiro would join the ALL-INKL.DE Münnich Motorsport with Néstor Girolami and Esteban Guerrieri remaining at the ALL-INKL.COM Münnich Motorsport.

Comtoyou Racing switched from the running Audi RS 3 LMS TCR to the all-new facelifted Audi RS 3 LMS TCR (2021). Nathanaël Berthon, Gilles Magnus and Tom Coronel remained with Comtoyou Racing and Frédéric Vervisch returned to the series and the team after having last raced in 2019.

Cyan Racing committed to run four Lynk & Co 03 TCR cars for the season, Yann Ehrlacher and Yvan Muller were confirmed as drivers for Cyan Racing Lynk & Co and announced that Thed Björk and Santiago Urrutia were confirmed as drivers for Cyan Performance Lynk & Co.

Hyundai switched from the running Hyundai i30 N TCR to the all-new Hyundai Elantra N TCR. BRC Racing Team entered under the BRC Hyundai N Lukoil Squadra Corse banner with two former champions in Norbert Michelisz and Gabriele Tarquini, while Engstler Motorsport entered the remaining two Hyundai cars under the Engstler Hyundai N Liqui Moly Racing Team name for Luca Engstler and Jean-Karl Vernay, the latter having switched from Team Mulsanne to replace Nicky Catsburg. Target Competition joined full-time from the TCR Europe with Swedish siblings Andreas and Jessica Bäckman, who became the first woman to race in the championship. 2017 TCR Italy Touring Car Championship winner Nicola Baldan is also set to participate at selected rounds as a guest driver.

The Zengő Motorsport structure continued at the WTCR and expanded to four Cupra León Competición TCR cars, running under two distinct banners. Bence Boldizs and Mikel Azcona remained with the team, with series returnees Jordi Gené, who had last taken part in the series in 2010, when it was called the World Touring Car Championship, and 2012 World Touring Car Championship & 2020 STCC TCR Scandinavia Touring Car Championship winner Robert Huff, who came back after a year's absence, joining them at Zengő Motorsport Drivers’ Academy and Zengő Motorsport Services KFT respectively.

== Calendar ==
The preliminary race calendar was published by the championship management on 13 November 2020. A change from previous years is that in 2021, for cost-cutting reasons, two races will be held on a weekend instead of three, and the series will return to the Asian continent after a year of omission. On 22 January 2021, the calendar was updated, postponing the Race of Hungary to 21–22 August and replacing the Race of Slovakia with the Race of Italy. On 10 May 2021, it was announced that the Race of Portugal would be held at the Circuito do Estoril instead of the Circuito Internacional de Vila Real. On 19 August 2021, three new rounds were announced as replacements for the races in the Far East.

| Round | Race | Race name | Circuit | Date | Supporting |
|---|---|---|---|---|---|
| 1 | 1 | Race of Germany | (Germany) Nürburgring Nordschleife | 3–5 June | Nürburgring 24 Hours |
| 1 | 2 | Race of Germany | (Germany) Nürburgring Nordschleife | 3–5 June | Nürburgring 24 Hours |
| 2 | 3 | Race of Portugal | (Portugal) Circuito do Estoril | 26–27 June (Note: The Portugal round was originally due to take place at the Circuito Internacional de Vila Real, but the venue was changed to Circuito do Estoril in response to the COVID-19 pandemic.) | |
| 2 | 4 | Race of Portugal | (Portugal) Circuito do Estoril | 26–27 June | |
| 3 | 5 | Race of Spain | (Spain) Ciudad del Motor de Aragón | 10–11 July | ETCR Championship |
| 3 | 6 | Race of Spain | (Spain) Ciudad del Motor de Aragón | 10–11 July | ETCR Championship |
| 4 | 7 | Race of Hungary | (Hungary) Hungaroring | 21–22 August (Note: The Hungaroring round was originally due to take place on 14–16 May 2021. It was postponed to 21–22 August in response to the COVID-19 pandemic.) | ETCR Championship |
| 4 | 8 | Race of Hungary | (Hungary) Hungaroring | 21–22 August | ETCR Championship |
| 5 | 9 | Race of Czech Republic | (Czech Republic) Autodrom Most | 9–10 October | FIM EWC |
| 5 | 10 | Race of Czech Republic | (Czech Republic) Autodrom Most | 9–10 October | FIM EWC |
| 6 | 11 | Race of France | (France) Circuit Pau-Arnos | 16–17 October | ETCR Championship |
| 6 | 12 | Race of France | (France) Circuit Pau-Arnos | 16–17 October | ETCR Championship |
| 7 | 13 | Race of Italy | (Italy) Adria International Raceway | 6–7 November (Note: The Adria round was not originally on the 2021 WTCR calendar, but was added in January 2021. It was then postponed to 6–7 November.) | |
| 7 | 14 | Race of Italy | (Italy) Adria International Raceway | 6–7 November | |
| 8 | 15 | Race of Russia | (Russia) Sochi Autodrom | 27–28 November | |
| 8 | 16 | Race of Russia | (Russia) Sochi Autodrom | 27–28 November | |

Cancelled due to the COVID-19 pandemic
| Race name | Circuit | Original date |
|---|---|---|
| Race of Slovakia | Automotodróm Slovakia Ring | 22–23 May |
| Race of Portugal | (Portugal) Circuito Internacional de Vila Real | 26–27 June |
| Race of Korea | (South Korea) Inje Speedium | 16–17 October |
| Race of China | (China) Ningbo International Circuit | 6–7 November |
| Race of Macau | Guia Circuit, Macau | 20–21 November |

== Results ==
| Race | Race name | Pole position | Fastest lap | Winning driver | Winning team | Junior winner | WTCR Trophy winner | Report |
|---|---|---|---|---|---|---|---|---|
| 1 | Race of Germany | | (Spain) Mikel Azcona | (Portugal) Tiago Monteiro | (Germany) ALL-INKL.DE Münnich Motorsport | (Belgium) Gilles Magnus | (Netherlands) Tom Coronel | Report |
| 2 | Race of Germany | (Argentina) Néstor Girolami | (France) Jean-Karl Vernay | (France) Jean-Karl Vernay | (Germany) Engstler Hyundai N Liqui Moly Racing Team | (Germany) Luca Engstler | (Belgium) Gilles Magnus | Report |
| 3 | Race of Portugal | | (France) Yann Ehrlacher | (France) Yann Ehrlacher | (Sweden) Cyan Racing Lynk & Co | (Belgium) Gilles Magnus | (Belgium) Gilles Magnus | Report |
| 4 | Race of Portugal | (Argentina) Esteban Guerrieri | (Hungary) Attila Tassi | (Hungary) Attila Tassi | (Germany) ALL-INKL.DE Münnich Motorsport | (Belgium) Gilles Magnus | (Belgium) Gilles Magnus | Report |
| 5 | Race of Spain | | (Italy) Gabriele Tarquini | (Italy) Gabriele Tarquini | (Italy) BRC Hyundai N Lukoil Squadra Corse | (Belgium) Gilles Magnus | (Netherlands) Tom Coronel | Report |
| 6 | Race of Spain | (Belgium) Frédéric Vervisch | (Belgium) Frédéric Vervisch | (Belgium) Frédéric Vervisch | (Belgium) Comtoyou Team Audi Sport | (Belgium) Gilles Magnus | (Belgium) Gilles Magnus | Report |
| 7 | Race of Hungary | | (Belgium) Frédéric Vervisch | (Belgium) Gilles Magnus | (Belgium) Comtoyou Team Audi Sport | (Belgium) Gilles Magnus | (Belgium) Gilles Magnus | Report |
| 8 | Race of Hungary | (United Kingdom) Robert Huff | (Belgium) Frédéric Vervisch | (Uruguay) Santiago Urrutia | (Sweden) Cyan Performance Lynk & Co | (Belgium) Gilles Magnus | (Belgium) Gilles Magnus | Report |
| 9 | Race of Czech Republic | | (Argentina) Néstor Girolami | (Argentina) Néstor Girolami | (Germany) ALL-INKL.COM Münnich Motorsport | (Germany) Luca Engstler | (Netherlands) Tom Coronel | Report |
| 10 | Race of Czech Republic | (Spain) Mikel Azcona | (Spain) Mikel Azcona | (Hungary) Norbert Michelisz | (Italy) BRC Hyundai N Lukoil Squadra Corse | (Germany) Luca Engstler | (Belgium) Gilles Magnus | Report |
| 11 | Race of France | | (Belgium) Frédéric Vervisch | (Belgium) Frédéric Vervisch | (Belgium) Comtoyou Team Audi Sport | (Germany) Luca Engstler | (Netherlands) Tom Coronel | Report |
| 12 | Race of France | (France) Yvan Muller | (France) Jean-Karl Vernay | (France) Jean-Karl Vernay | (Germany) Engstler Hyundai N Liqui Moly Racing Team | (Germany) Luca Engstler | (Netherlands) Tom Coronel | Report |
| 13 | Race of Italy | | (Netherlands) Tom Coronel | (Uruguay) Santiago Urrutia | (Sweden) Cyan Performance Lynk & Co | (Belgium) Gilles Magnus | (Netherlands) Tom Coronel | Report |
| 14 | Race of Italy | (France) Yann Ehrlacher | (Belgium) Frédéric Vervisch | (France) Yann Ehrlacher | (Sweden) Cyan Racing Lynk & Co | (Belgium) Gilles Magnus | (Belgium) Gilles Magnus | Report |
| 15 | Race of Russia | | (United Kingdom) Robert Huff | (Spain) Mikel Azcona | (Hungary) Zengő Motorsport Services KFT | (Belgium) Gilles Magnus | (Belgium) Gilles Magnus | Report |
| 16 | Race of Russia | (France) Yvan Muller | (United Kingdom) Robert Huff | (United Kingdom) Robert Huff | (Hungary) Zengő Motorsport Services KFT | (Germany) Luca Engstler | (Netherlands) Tom Coronel | Report |

== Championship standings ==
Scoring system

| Position | 1st | 2nd | 3rd | 4th | 5th | 6th | 7th | 8th | 9th | 10th | 11th | 12th | 13th | 14th | 15th |
| Qualifying 1 & 3 | 5 | 4 | 3 | 2 | 1 | —N/a | | | | | | | | | |
| Race | 25 | 20 | 16 | 13 | 11 | 10 | 9 | 8 | 7 | 6 | 5 | 4 | 3 | 2 | 1 |

Scoring system for WTCR Trophy

| Position | 1st | 2nd | 3rd | 4th | 5th | FL |
| Qualifying | 1 | —N/a | | | | |
| Race | 10 | 8 | 5 | 3 | 1 | 1 |

=== Drivers' championship ===
| Pos. | Driver | GER (Germany) | | PRT (Portugal) | | ESP (Spain) | | HUN (Hungary) | | CZE (Czech Republic) | | FRA (France) | | ITA (Italy) | | RUS (Russia) | | Pts. |
|---|---|---|---|---|---|---|---|---|---|---|---|---|---|---|---|---|---|---|
| 1 | (France) Yann Ehrlacher | 8 | 10 | 1 | 6 | 5^{1} | 7 | 3 | 4 | 3 | 4^{3} | 8^{1} | 5^{5} | 10^{1} | 1^{1} | 5 | 6^{5} | 223 |
| 2 | (Belgium) Frédéric Vervisch | 15 | Ret | 13 | 11 | 8^{4} | 1^{1} | 4 | 2 | 13 | 8 | 1 | 4 | 6 | 2^{2} | 6 | 2 | 195 |
| 3 | (France) Jean-Karl Vernay | 10 | 1^{2} | Ret | 2^{4} | 9 | 4^{5} | 14 | 13 | 6^{5} | 14^{5} | 6^{3} | 1^{2} | 14 | 19 | 2 | 5 | 177 |
| 4 | (France) Yvan Muller | 2 | 7 | 2 | 9 | 11 | 10 | 15 | 6 | 4 | 6 | Ret | 2^{1} | 5 | 4^{5} | 8^{1} | Ret^{1} | 169 |
| 5 | (Uruguay) Santiago Urrutia | 3 | 5^{5} | 3 | 5 | 12 | Ret | 7^{3} | 1^{2} | 11 | Ret | 15 | 3^{4} | 1^{2} | 13 | 9^{3} | Ret | 167 |
| 6 | (Argentina) Esteban Guerrieri | 4 | 12^{3} | 5^{1} | 8^{1} | 15 | 13 | 8 | 8 | 2^{1} | 3^{4} | 4^{5} | 7 | 3 | 6 | Ret | DNS | 164 |
| 7 | (Spain) Mikel Azcona | 16 | Ret | 10 | Ret | 2 | 11 | 2^{1} | 3 | 7^{2} | 2^{1} | 13 | 14 | 11 | 11 | 1^{2} | Ret^{2} | 158 |
| 8 | (Hungary) Norbert Michelisz | 5 | Ret | Ret^{5} | 3 | 7^{5} | NC^{4} | 6 | 14^{3} | 15 | 1^{2} | 7^{2} | 6^{3} | 4^{5} | 7 | 12 | 8 | 146 |
| 9 | (Sweden) Thed Björk | 13 | Ret | 6 | 7 | 10 | 2^{2} | 5 | 7^{5} | 5 | 15 | 2 | 9 | 12^{4} | 8^{3} | 10 | 11 | 141 |
| 10 | (Belgium) Gilles Magnus | 14 | 9 | 8 | 14 | 6 | 3^{3} | 1^{2} | 9 | NC | 9 | 14 | 17 | 7^{3} | 3^{4} | 3 | Ret | 139 |
| 11 | (Argentina) Néstor Girolami | 9 | 3^{1} | Ret^{3} | 13^{3} | 18 | 12 | 9^{5} | 5^{4} | 1^{4} | 16 | 5 | Ret | 8 | Ret | 11 | 7^{3} | 131 |
| 12 | (Italy) Gabriele Tarquini | 6 | Ret | Ret | 4 | 1 | 6 | 12 | Ret | 10 | Ret | 3^{4} | 8 | 9 | 5 | 14 | Ret | 114 |
| 13 | (France) Nathanaël Berthon | 11 | 6 | 11 | 12 | 4^{3} | 5 | Ret | 12 | Ret^{3} | 5 | 11 | 10 | 21 | 14 | 4^{5} | 3^{4} | 114 |
| 14 | (Hungary) Attila Tassi | 12 | 4 | 7^{2} | 1^{5} | 17 | 15 | 13 | 10 | Ret | Ret | 12 | 16 | 16 | 12 | 7 | 4 | 96 |
| 15 | (Germany) Luca Engstler | 17 | 2^{4} | 12 | Ret | 13 | 8 | 11 | 15 | 12 | 7 | 9 | 11 | 15 | 10 | 13 | 10 | 86 |
| 16 | (Netherlands) Tom Coronel | 7 | 11 | 17 | Ret | 3^{2} | Ret | 21 | 16 | 9 | 10 | 10 | 13 | 2 | Ret | 16 | 9 | 83 |
| 17 | (Portugal) Tiago Monteiro | 1 | 8 | 4^{4} | 18^{2} | 20 | 14 | 10 | 11 | 16 | 12 | Ret | 12 | 17 | 15 | WD | WD | 75 |
| 18 | (United Kingdom) Robert Huff | Ret | Ret | 9 | 10 | Ret | 9 | Ret^{4} | 18^{1} | 8 | Ret | NC | 15 | 13 | 9 | Ret^{4} | 1 | 73 |
| 19 | (Spain) Jordi Gené | 18 | Ret | 14 | 15 | 14 | Ret | 16 | 17 | WD | WD | Ret | 18 | 20 | 17 | 15 | 12 | 10 |
| 20 | (Hungary) Bence Boldizs | 19 | 13 | 18 | 19 | DSQ | 16 | 17 | 19 | 14 | 13 | 16 | 19 | 18 | 16 | 17 | Ret | 9 |
| 21 | (Sweden) Jessica Bäckman | 21 | 14 | 16 | 16 | 19 | 17 | 20 | 21 | | | | | | | | | 2 |
| 22 | (Sweden) Andreas Bäckman | 20 | Ret | 15 | 17 | 16 | Ret | 19 | Ret | | | | | | | | | 1 |
| 23 | (Italy) Nicola Baldan (Note: Baldan was ineligible to score points at the Race of Hungary as he was a wildcard entry.) | | | | | | | 18 | 20 | | | | | 19 | 18 | | | 0 |
Wildcard entries ineligible for points
| — | (Czech Republic) Petr Fulín | | | | | | | | | Ret | 11 | | | | | | | — |
| — | (Russia) Mikhail Mityaev | | | | | | | | | | | | | | | 19 | 13 | — |
| — | (Russia) Kirill Ladygin | | | | | | | | | | | | | | | 18 | 14 | — |
| Pos. | Driver | GER (Germany) | | PRT (Portugal) | | ESP (Spain) | | HUN (Hungary) | | CZE (Czech Republic) | | FRA (France) | | ITA (Italy) | | RUS (Russia) | | Pts. |

| Colour | Result |
|---|---|
| Gold | Winner |
| Silver | Second place |
| Bronze | Third place |
| Green | Points classification |
| Blue | Non-points classification |
| Blue | Non-classified finish (NC) |
| Purple | Retired, not classified (Ret) |
| Red | Did not qualify (DNQ) |
| Red | Did not pre-qualify (DNPQ) |
| Black | Disqualified (DSQ) |
| White | Did not start (DNS) |
| White | Withdrew (WD) |
| White | Race cancelled (C) |
| Blank | Did not practice (DNP) |
| Blank | Did not arrive (DNA) |
| Blank | Excluded (EX) |

=== Teams' championship ===
| Pos. | Team | No. | GER (Germany) | | PRT (Portugal) | | ESP (Spain) | | HUN (Hungary) | | CZE (Czech Republic) | | FRA (France) | | ITA (Italy) | | RUS (Russia) | | Pts. |
|---|---|---|---|---|---|---|---|---|---|---|---|---|---|---|---|---|---|---|---|
| 1 | (Sweden) Cyan Racing Lynk & Co | 68 | 8 | 10 | 1 | 6 | 5^{1} | 7 | 3 | 4 | 3 | 4^{3} | 8^{1} | 5^{5} | 10^{1} | 1^{1} | 5 | 6^{5} | 392 |
| 1 | (Sweden) Cyan Racing Lynk & Co | 100 | 2 | 7 | 2 | 9 | 11 | 10 | 15 | 6 | 4 | 6 | Ret | 2^{1} | 5 | 4^{5} | 8^{1} | Ret^{1} | 392 |
| 2 | (Belgium) Comtoyou Team Audi Sport | 16 | 14 | 9 | 8 | 14 | 6 | 3^{3} | 1^{2} | 9 | NC | 9 | 14 | 17 | 7^{3} | 3^{4} | 3 | Ret | 334 |
| 2 | (Belgium) Comtoyou Team Audi Sport | 22 | 15 | Ret | 13 | 11 | 8^{4} | 1^{1} | 4 | 2 | 13 | 8 | 1 | 4 | 6 | 2^{2} | 6 | 2 | 334 |
| 3 | (Sweden) Cyan Performance Lynk & Co | 11 | 13 | Ret | 6 | 7 | 10 | 2^{2} | 5 | 7^{5} | 5 | 15 | 2 | 9 | 12^{4} | 8^{3} | 10 | 11 | 308 |
| 3 | (Sweden) Cyan Performance Lynk & Co | 12 | 3 | 5^{5} | 3 | 5 | 12 | Ret | 7^{3} | 1^{2} | 11 | Ret | 15 | 3^{4} | 1^{2} | 13 | 9^{3} | Ret | 308 |
| 4 | (Germany) ALL-INKL.COM Münnich Motorsport | 29 | 9 | 3^{1} | Ret^{3} | 13^{3} | 18 | 12 | 9^{5} | 5^{4} | 1^{4} | 16 | 5 | Ret | 8 | Ret | 11 | 7^{3} | 295 |
| 4 | (Germany) ALL-INKL.COM Münnich Motorsport | 86 | 4 | 12^{3} | 5^{1} | 8^{1} | 15 | 13 | 8 | 8 | 2^{1} | 3^{4} | 4^{5} | 7 | 3 | 6 | Ret | DNS | 295 |
| 5 | (Germany) Engstler Hyundai N Liqui Moly Racing Team | 8 | 17 | 2^{4} | 12 | Ret | 13 | 8 | 11 | 15 | 12 | 7 | 9 | 11 | 15 | 10 | 13 | 10 | 263 |
| 5 | (Germany) Engstler Hyundai N Liqui Moly Racing Team | 69 | 10 | 1^{2} | Ret | 2^{4} | 9 | 4^{5} | 14 | 13 | 6^{5} | 14^{5} | 6^{3} | 1^{2} | 14 | 19 | 2 | 5 | 263 |
| 6 | (Italy) BRC Hyundai N Lukoil Squadra Corse | 3 | 6 | Ret | Ret | 4 | 1 | 6 | 12 | Ret | 10 | Ret | 3^{4} | 8 | 9 | 5 | 14 | Ret | 260 |
| 6 | (Italy) BRC Hyundai N Lukoil Squadra Corse | 5 | 5 | Ret | Ret^{5} | 3 | 7^{5} | NC^{4} | 6 | 14^{3} | 15 | 1^{2} | 7^{2} | 6^{3} | 4^{5} | 7 | 12 | 8 | 260 |
| 7 | (Hungary) Zengő Motorsport Services KFT | 79 | Ret | Ret | 9 | 10 | Ret | 9 | Ret^{4} | 18^{1} | 8 | Ret | NC | 15 | 13 | 9 | Ret^{4} | 1 | 231 |
| 7 | (Hungary) Zengő Motorsport Services KFT | 96 | 16 | Ret | 10 | Ret | 2 | 11 | 2^{1} | 3 | 7^{2} | 2^{1} | 13 | 14 | 11 | 11 | 1^{2} | Ret^{2} | 231 |
| 8 | (Belgium) Comtoyou DHL Team Audi Sport | 17 | 11 | 6 | 11 | 12 | 4^{3} | 5 | Ret | 12 | Ret^{3} | 5 | 11 | 10 | 21 | 14 | 4^{5} | 3^{4} | 197 |
| 8 | (Belgium) Comtoyou DHL Team Audi Sport | 32 | 7 | 11 | 17 | Ret | 3^{2} | Ret | 21 | 16 | 9 | 10 | 10 | 13 | 2 | Ret | 16 | 9 | 197 |
| 9 | (Germany) ALL-INKL.DE Münnich Motorsport | 9 | 12 | 4 | 7^{2} | 1^{5} | 17 | 15 | 13 | 10 | Ret | Ret | 12 | 16 | 16 | 12 | 7 | 4 | 171 |
| 9 | (Germany) ALL-INKL.DE Münnich Motorsport | 18 | 1 | 8 | 4^{4} | 18^{2} | 20 | 14 | 10 | 11 | 16 | 12 | Ret | 12 | 17 | 15 | WD | WD | 171 |
| 10 | (Hungary) Zengő Motorsport Drivers’ Academy | 28 | 18 | Ret | 14 | 15 | 14 | Ret | 16 | 17 | WD | WD | Ret | 18 | 20 | 17 | 15 | 12 | 19 |
| 10 | (Hungary) Zengő Motorsport Drivers’ Academy | 55 | 19 | 13 | 18 | 19 | DSQ | 16 | 17 | 19 | 14 | 13 | 16 | 19 | 18 | 16 | 17 | Ret | 19 |
| 11 | (Italy) Target srl | 19 | 20 | Ret | 15 | 17 | 16 | Ret | 19 | Ret | | | | | | | | | 3 |
| 11 | (Italy) Target srl | 26 | 21 | 14 | 16 | 16 | 19 | 17 | 20 | 21 | | | | | | | | | 3 |
| 11 | (Italy) Target srl | 82 | | | | | | | | | | | | | 19 | 18 | | | 3 |
Wildcard entries ineligible for points
| — | (Czech Republic) Full In Race Academy | 222 | | | | | | | | | Ret | 11 | | | | | | | — |
| — | (Russia) Rosneft Lada Sport | 20 | | | | | | | | | | | | | | | 18 | 14 | — |
| — | (Russia) Rosneft Lada Sport | 30 | | | | | | | | | | | | | | | 19 | 13 | — |
| — | (Italy) Target srl | 82 | | | | | | | 18 | 20 | | | | | | | | | — |
| Pos. | Team | No. | GER (Germany) | | PRT (Portugal) | | ESP (Spain) | | HUN (Hungary) | | CZE (Czech Republic) | | FRA (France) | | ITA (Italy) | | RUS (Russia) | | Pts. |

| Colour | Result |
|---|---|
| Gold | Winner |
| Silver | Second place |
| Bronze | Third place |
| Green | Points classification |
| Blue | Non-points classification |
| Blue | Non-classified finish (NC) |
| Purple | Retired, not classified (Ret) |
| Red | Did not qualify (DNQ) |
| Red | Did not pre-qualify (DNPQ) |
| Black | Disqualified (DSQ) |
| White | Did not start (DNS) |
| White | Withdrew (WD) |
| White | Race cancelled (C) |
| Blank | Did not practice (DNP) |
| Blank | Did not arrive (DNA) |
| Blank | Excluded (EX) |

=== Juniors' championship ===
| Pos. | Driver | GER (Germany) | | PRT (Portugal) | | ESP (Spain) | | HUN (Hungary) | | CZE (Czech Republic) | | FRA (France) | | ITA (Italy) | | RUS (Russia) | | Pts. |
|---|---|---|---|---|---|---|---|---|---|---|---|---|---|---|---|---|---|---|
| 1 | (Germany) Luca Engstler | 17 | 2^{1} | 12^{1} | Ret | 13^{1} | 8 | 11^{2} | 15 | 12^{1} | 7 | 9^{1} | 11 | 15^{2} | 10 | 13^{2} | 10 | 372 |
| 2 | (Belgium) Gilles Magnus | 14 | 9^{2} | 8^{2} | 14 | 6^{2} | 3^{1} | 1^{1} | 9 | NC | 9 | 14 | 17 | 7^{1} | 3^{1} | 3^{1} | Ret | 371 |
| 3 | (Hungary) Bence Boldizs | 19 | 13^{4} | 18^{4} | 19 | DSQ^{3} | 16 | 17^{4} | 19 | 14^{2} | 13 | 16^{2} | 19 | 18^{3} | 16 | 17^{3} | Ret | 250 |
| 4 | (Sweden) Jessica Bäckman | 21 | 14^{3} | 16^{3} | 16 | 19^{4} | 17 | 20^{3} | 21 | | | | | | | | | 131 |
| Pos. | Driver | GER (Germany) | | PRT (Portugal) | | ESP (Spain) | | HUN (Hungary) | | CZE (Czech Republic) | | FRA (France) | | ITA (Italy) | | RUS (Russia) | | Pts. |

=== WTCR Trophy ===
Eligible for drivers racing without manufacturer support.

| Pos. | Driver | GER (Germany) | | PRT (Portugal) | | ESP (Spain) | | HUN (Hungary) | | CZE (Czech Republic) | | FRA (France) | | ITA (Italy) | | RUS (Russia) | | Pts. |
|---|---|---|---|---|---|---|---|---|---|---|---|---|---|---|---|---|---|---|
| 1 | (Belgium) Gilles Magnus | 14 | 9 | 8 | 14^{1} | 6 | 3^{1} | 1 | 9^{1} | NC | 9 | 14 | 17 | 7 | 3^{1} | 3 | Ret^{1} | 143 |
| 2 | (Netherlands) Tom Coronel | 7 | 11^{1} | 17 | Ret | 3 | Ret | 21 | 16 | 9 | 10^{1} | 10 | 13^{1} | 2 | Ret | 16 | 9 | 114 |
| 3 | (Hungary) Bence Boldizs | 19 | 13 | 18 | 19 | DSQ | 16 | 17 | 19 | 14 | 13 | 16 | 19 | 18 | 16 | 17 | Ret | 77 |
| 4 | (Sweden) Jessica Bäckman | 21 | 14 | 16 | 16 | 19 | 17 | 20 | 21 | | | | | | | | | 32 |
| 5 | (Sweden) Andreas Bäckman | 20 | Ret | 15 | 17 | 16 | Ret | 19 | Ret | | | | | | | | | 27 |
| 6 | (Italy) Nicola Baldan | | | | | | | | | | | | | 19 | 18 | | | 8 |
| Pos. | Driver | GER (Germany) | | PRT (Portugal) | | ESP (Spain) | | HUN (Hungary) | | CZE (Czech Republic) | | FRA (France) | | ITA (Italy) | | RUS (Russia) | | Pts. |
