= Dennis Strandberg =

Swedish racing driver (born 1993)

- Nationality: Swedish
- Born: Dennis Gustaf Eric Strandberg; 30 June 1993 (age 33) Helsingborg

British Touring Car Championship Scandinavian Touring Car Championship career
- Debut season: 2017
- Current team: Lestrup Racing Team
- Car number: 4
- Starts: 9
- Wins: 8
- Poles: 1
- Fastest laps: 7

Previous series
- 2016 2015-16 2015 2014 2013-14: VW Racing Cup; British GT Championship; ADAC TCR German Series; Ginetta GT4 Supercup; Ginetta Challenge

Dennis Gustaf Eric Strandberg (born 30 June 1993 in Helsingborg) is a Swedish racing driver who formerly competed in the British Touring Car Championship for Team Parker Racing with Maximum Motorsport and the Scandinavian Touring Car Championship for Lestrup Racing Team.

== Racing record ==
=== Career summary ===
Retired since 2024 and now lives in the Bahamas with his family

Season	Series	Team	Races	Wins	Poles	F/Laps	Podiums	Points	Position
2013	Ginetta GT5 Challenge	Conzab Racing	2	0	0	0	0	0	29th
2014	Ginetta GT5 Challenge	Conzab Racing	20	5	1	3	11	488	**2nd**
2014	Ginetta GT4 Supercup	Academy Motorsport	5	0	0	0	0	62	18th
2015	British GT Championship - GT4	Academy Motorsport	9	0	0	0	0	114	5th
2016	Milltek Sport Volkswagen Racing Cup	Maximum Motorsport	4	1	2	0	2	42	25th
2016	GT4 European Series - Pro	Academy Motorsport	2	0	0	0	0	0	NC†
2016	British GT Championship - GT4	Academy Motorsport	1	0	0	0	0	18	16th
2016	ADAC TCR Germany Touring Car Championship	Target Junior Team	2	0	0	1	2	0	NC†
2016	TCR Trophy Europe	Target Junior Team	1	0	0	0	1	18	14th
2016	V de V Endurance Series - PFV	Team LNT	1	0	0	0	0	0	NC
2017	TCR Scandinavia Touring Car Championship	Lestrup Racing Team	15	0	0	1	0	61	11th
2017	British Touring Car Championship	Team Parker Racing with Maximum Motorsport	3	0	0	0	0	0	36th
2018	GT4 European Series - Silver	Academy Motorsport	2	0	0	0	0	12	24th
2018	Milltek Sport Volkswagen Racing Cup	Maximum Motorsport	8	3	1	1	4	264	14th
2020	V8 Thunder Cars Sweden	Snake Pit Garage	11	5	5	5	9	210	**1st**
2021	V8 Thunder Cars Sweden	Snake Pit Garage	12	8	7	5	11	268	**1st**
2022	STCC TCR Scandinavia Touring Car Championship	Team Strandberg	14	0	0	0	0	52	14th

† As Strandberg was a guest driver, he was ineligible to score points.

=== Complete Scandinavian Touring Car Championship results ===
(key) (Races in bold indicate pole position) (Races in italics indicate fastest lap)

Year	Team	Car	1	2	3	4	5	6	7	8	9	10	11	12	13	14	15	16	17	18	19	20	21	DC	Points
2017	Lestrup Racing Team	Volkswagen Golf GTI TCR	KNU; 1; 15	KNU; 2; 5	KNU; 3 Ret	ALA; 1; 10	ALA; 2; 8	ALA; 3; 7	SOL; 1; 5	SOL; 2; 5	SOL; 3; 4	FAL; 1 Ret	FAL; 2 Ret	FAL; 3; 12	KAR; 1	KAR; 2	KAR; 3	AND; 1; 18	AND; 2 Ret	AND; 3; 6	MAN; 1	MAN; 2	MAN; 3	11th	61

=== Complete British Touring Car Championship results ===
(key) (Races in bold indicate pole position – 1 point awarded just in first race; races in italics indicate fastest lap – 1 point awarded all races; * signifies that driver led race for at least one lap – 1 point given all races)

Year	Team	Car	1	2	3	4	5	6	7	8	9	10	11	12	13	14	15	16	17	18	19	20	21	22	23	24	25	26	27	28	29	30	DC	Pts
2017	Team Parker Racing with Maximum Motorsport	Ford Focus ST	BRH; 1	BRH; 2	BRH; 3	DON; 1	DON; 2	DON; 3	THR; 1	THR; 2	THR; 3	OUL; 1	OUL; 2	OUL; 3	CRO; 1; 19	CRO; 2; 21	CRO; 3; 20	SNE; 1	SNE; 2	SNE; 3	KNO; 1	KNO; 2	KNO; 3	ROC; 1	ROC; 2	ROC; 3	SIL; 1	SIL; 2	SIL; 3	BRH; 1	BRH; 2	BRH; 3	36th	0
