= 2023 GT4 European Series =

The 2023 GT4 European Series is the sixteenth season of the GT4 European Series, a Sports car racing championship organised by Stéphane Ratel Organisation (SRO). The season began at Monza on 22 April, and will end at Barcelona on 1 October.

== Calendar ==
The 2023 calendar was announced via the website on 7 December 2022.

Round	Circuit	Date	Supporting	Invitational
1	Autodromo Nazionale Monza, Monza, Italy	22–23 April	GT World Challenge Europe Endurance Cup	None
2	Circuit Paul Ricard, Le Castellet, France	3–4 June	GT World Challenge Europe Endurance Cup	GT4 Scandinavia
3	Circuit de Spa-Francorchamps, Stavelot, Belgium	30 June–1 July	GT World Challenge Europe Endurance Cup	GT4 Scandinavia
4	Misano World Circuit, Misano, Italy	14–16 July	GT World Challenge Sprint Cup	None
5	Hockenheimring, Hockenheim, Germany	2–3 September	GT World Challenge Sprint Cup	None
6	Circuit de Barcelona-Catalunya, Montmeló, Spain	30 September–1 October	GT World Challenge Europe Endurance Cup	None
Cancelled events
NC	Vallelunga Circuit, Campagnano di Roma, Italy	28–29 October	6 Hours of Vallelunga	None

== Entry list ==
The full season entry list was released on 22 March and contained 52 cars.

Team	Car	No.	Drivers	Class	Rounds
(France) TGR Team CMR	Toyota GR Supra GT4	1	(Belgium) Stéphane Lémeret	S	3
(France) TGR Team CMR	Toyota GR Supra GT4	1	(France) Corentin Tierce	S	3
(Switzerland) Hofor Racing by Bonk Motorsport	BMW M4 GT4 Gen II	2	(Italy) Gabriele Piana	S	All
(Switzerland) Hofor Racing by Bonk Motorsport	BMW M4 GT4 Gen II	2	(Germany) Michael Schrey	S	All
(France) Team Speedcar	Audi R8 LMS GT4 Evo	3	(France) Robert Consani	S	All
(France) Team Speedcar	Audi R8 LMS GT4 Evo	3	(France) Benjamin Lariche	S	All
(France) Team Speedcar	Audi R8 LMS GT4 Evo	83	(France) Fabien Boeri	Am	1–2
(France) Team Speedcar	Audi R8 LMS GT4 Evo	83	(France) Hugo Roch	Am	1–2
(France) Team Speedcar	Audi R8 LMS GT4 Evo	83	(France) Fabien Boeri	PA	5
(France) Team Speedcar	Audi R8 LMS GT4 Evo	83	(France) Julien Rodrigues	PA	5
(France) Team Speedcar	Audi R8 LMS GT4 Evo	83	(France) Jim Pla	PA	6
(France) Team Speedcar	Audi R8 LMS GT4 Evo	83	(France) Jean-Luc Beauelique	PA	6
(Germany) BCMC Motorsport powered by EastSide Motorsport	Mercedes-AMG GT4	4	(Spain) Marc de Fulgencio	S	All
(Germany) BCMC Motorsport powered by EastSide Motorsport	Mercedes-AMG GT4	4	(Germany) Marcel Lenerz	S	1–4
(Germany) BCMC Motorsport powered by EastSide Motorsport	Mercedes-AMG GT4	4	(Germany) Philipp Gogollok	S	5–6
(Germany) EastSide Motorsport	Mercedes-AMG GT4	20	(Germany) Denis Bulatov (Note: Bulatov is Russian, but he competes under a German licence as Russian national emblems were banned by the FIA following the Russian invasion of Ukraine.)	PA	All
(Germany) EastSide Motorsport	Mercedes-AMG GT4	20	(Germany) Lukas Mayer	PA	All
(Spain) Mirage Racing	Aston Martin Vantage AMR GT4	5	(United Kingdom) Ruben del Sarte	S	All
(Spain) Mirage Racing	Aston Martin Vantage AMR GT4	5	(Norway) Emil Heyerdahl	S	1
(Spain) Mirage Racing	Aston Martin Vantage AMR GT4	5	(United Arab Emirates) Jamie Day	S	2–6
(Spain) Mirage Racing	Aston Martin Vantage AMR GT4	6	(United Arab Emirates) Jamie Day	S	1
(Spain) Mirage Racing	Aston Martin Vantage AMR GT4	6	(United States) Rory van der Steur	S	1
(Spain) Mirage Racing by MB Performance	Aston Martin Vantage AMR GT4	7	(France) Romain Carton	S	1–4
(Spain) Mirage Racing by MB Performance	Aston Martin Vantage AMR GT4	7	(France) Louis Meric	S	1–4
(Belgium) TGR Team Xwift Racing Events	Toyota GR Supra GT4 Evo	8	(France) Etienne Cheli	S	All
(Belgium) TGR Team Xwift Racing Events	Toyota GR Supra GT4 Evo	8	(Belgium) Antoine Potty	S	All
(Germany) racing one	Aston Martin Vantage AMR GT4	9	(United States) Andy Lee	PA	3
(Germany) racing one	Aston Martin Vantage AMR GT4	9	(United States) Todd Parriott	PA	3
(Germany) racing one	Aston Martin Vantage AMR GT4	19	(Sweden) Andreas Bäckman	S	2–6
(Germany) racing one	Aston Martin Vantage AMR GT4	19	(Sweden) Jessica Bäckman	S	2–6
(France) AVR-Avvatar	Porsche 718 Cayman GT4 RS Clubsport	10	(France) Alban Varutti	Am	All
(France) AVR-Avvatar	Porsche 718 Cayman GT4 RS Clubsport	10	(France) Julien Piguet	Am	1, 3–6
(Turkey) Borusan Otomotiv Motorsport	BMW M4 GT4 Gen II	11	(Turkey) Yagiz Gedik	S	All
(Turkey) Borusan Otomotiv Motorsport	BMW M4 GT4 Gen II	11	(France) Enzo Joulié	S	All
(Turkey) Borusan Otomotiv Motorsport	BMW M4 GT4 Gen II	12	(Turkey) Berkay Besler	S	All
(Turkey) Borusan Otomotiv Motorsport	BMW M4 GT4 Gen II	12	(United Kingdom) Tom Edgar	S	All
(Bulgaria) Overdrive Racing	Porsche 718 Cayman GT4 RS Clubsport	13	(Bulgaria) Joachim Bölting	Am	1–3, 5–6
(Bulgaria) Overdrive Racing	Porsche 718 Cayman GT4 RS Clubsport	13	(Bulgaria) Ivailo Tzonev	Am	1–3, 6
(Bulgaria) Overdrive Racing	Porsche 718 Cayman GT4 RS Clubsport	13	(Bulgaria) Tano Neumann	Am	5
(Bulgaria) Overdrive Racing	Porsche 718 Cayman GT4 RS Clubsport	23	(Bulgaria) Stefan Bostandjiev	S	All
(Bulgaria) Overdrive Racing	Porsche 718 Cayman GT4 RS Clubsport	23	(Bulgaria) Pavel Lefterov	S	All
(France) Saintéloc Junior Team	Audi R8 LMS GT4 Evo	14	(France) Anthony Beltoise	PA	All
(France) Saintéloc Junior Team	Audi R8 LMS GT4 Evo	14	(France) Cyril Saleilles	PA	All
(France) Saintéloc Junior Team	Audi R8 LMS GT4 Evo	42	(France) Grégory Guilvert	PA	All
(France) Saintéloc Junior Team	Audi R8 LMS GT4 Evo	42	(France) Christophe Hamon	PA	All
(France) Saintéloc Junior Team	Audi R8 LMS GT4 Evo	67	(Spain) Marc Lopez Gutierrez	S	1–2
(France) Saintéloc Junior Team	Audi R8 LMS GT4 Evo	67	(France) Paul Petit	S	1–2
(France) Saintéloc Junior Team	Audi R8 LMS GT4 Evo	67	(Spain) Marc Lopez Gutierrez	PA	3–5
(France) Saintéloc Junior Team	Audi R8 LMS GT4 Evo	67	(France) Paul Petit	PA	3–5
(France) Saintéloc Junior Team	Audi R8 LMS GT4 Evo	67	(France) Paul Petit	PA	6
(France) Saintéloc Junior Team	Audi R8 LMS GT4 Evo	67	(France) Grégory Curson Faessel	PA	6
(Spain) NM Racing Team	Mercedes-AMG GT4	15	(Spain) Lluc Ibáñez	S	All
(Spain) NM Racing Team	Mercedes-AMG GT4	15	(United States) Alexandre Papadoupulos	S	All
(Spain) NM Racing Team	Mercedes-AMG GT4	16	(Spain) Filip Vava	PA	All
(Spain) NM Racing Team	Mercedes-AMG GT4	16	(Czech Republic) Jakub Knoll	PA	1–5
(Spain) NM Racing Team	Mercedes-AMG GT4	16	(Spain) Guillermo Aso Arjol	PA	6
(Spain) NM Racing Team	Mercedes-AMG GT4	88	Stanislav Safronov (Note: Ekelchik, Safronov and Vaintrub are Russian, but are competing as a neutral competitor as Russian national emblems were banned by the FIA due to the Russian invasion of Ukraine.)	PA	All
(Spain) NM Racing Team	Mercedes-AMG GT4	88	Aleksandr Vaintrub	PA	All
(Netherlands) V8 Racing	Chevrolet Camaro GT4.R	17	(Netherlands) Dante Rappange	S	All
(Netherlands) V8 Racing	Chevrolet Camaro GT4.R	17	(Belgium) Kenny Herremans	S	1–5
(Netherlands) V8 Racing	Chevrolet Camaro GT4.R	17	(Belgium) Lars Zaenen	S	6
(Germany) TSR Team Spirit Racing	Aston Martin Vantage AMR GT4	18	(Germany) Markus Lugnstrass	Am	1–2
(Germany) TSR Team Spirit Racing	Aston Martin Vantage AMR GT4	18	(Germany) Lorenz Stegmann	Am	1–2
(Germany) TSR Team Spirit Racing	Aston Martin Vantage AMR GT4	18	(Germany) Markus Lugnstrass	PA	3–6
(Germany) TSR Team Spirit Racing	Aston Martin Vantage AMR GT4	18	(Germany) Lorenz Stegmann	PA	3–6
(Germany) Prosport Racing	Aston Martin Vantage AMR GT4	19	(Sweden) Andreas Bäckman	S	1
(Germany) Prosport Racing	Aston Martin Vantage AMR GT4	19	(Sweden) Jessica Bäckman	S	1
(France) Chazel Technologie Course	Alpine A110 GT4	21	(France) Jean-Paul Dominici	Am	All
(France) Chazel Technologie Course	Alpine A110 GT4	21	(France) Jean-Mathieu Leandri	Am	All
(France) Chazel Technologie Course	Alpine A110 GT4	317	(France) Alban Lagrange	Am	6
(France) Chazel Technologie Course	Alpine A110 GT4	317	(France) Fabien Boeri	Am	6
(Germany) Allied Racing	Porsche 718 Cayman GT4 RS Clubsport	22	(Denmark) Alexander Hartvig	S	All
(Germany) Allied Racing	Porsche 718 Cayman GT4 RS Clubsport	22	(Netherlands) Nathan Schaap	S	All
(Germany) Allied Racing	Porsche 718 Cayman GT4 RS Clubsport	44	(Denmark) Oskar Lind Kristensen	PA	All
(Germany) Allied Racing	Porsche 718 Cayman GT4 RS Clubsport	44	(United States) Jordan Wallace	PA	All
(France) JSB Compétition	Aston Martin Vantage AMR GT4	24	(France) Florian Briché	PA	1–2
(France) JSB Compétition	Aston Martin Vantage AMR GT4	24	(France) Julien Briché	PA	1–2
(France) JSB Compétition	Aston Martin Vantage AMR GT4	24	(France) Florian Briché	S	3–5
(France) JSB Compétition	Aston Martin Vantage AMR GT4	24	(France) Julien Briché	S	3–5
(France) JSB Compétition	Porsche 718 Cayman GT4 RS Clubsport	43	(France) Sacha Bottemane	PA	5
(France) JSB Compétition	Porsche 718 Cayman GT4 RS Clubsport	43	(France) Jean-Laurent Navarro	PA	5
(Switzerland) Racing Spirit of Léman	Aston Martin Vantage AMR GT4	26	(Belgium) Rodrigue Gillion	PA	All
(Switzerland) Racing Spirit of Léman	Aston Martin Vantage AMR GT4	26	(India) Akhil Rabindra	PA	All
(Switzerland) Racing Spirit of Léman	Aston Martin Vantage AMR GT4	74	(France) Victor Weyrich	S	All
(Switzerland) Racing Spirit of Léman	Aston Martin Vantage AMR GT4	74	(Switzerland) Konstantin Lachenauer	S	1–3
(Switzerland) Racing Spirit of Léman	Aston Martin Vantage AMR GT4	74	(Ecuador) Mateo Villagómez	S	4–6
(United Kingdom) Newbridge Motorsport	Aston Martin Vantage AMR GT4	27	(Republic of Ireland) Alex Denning	PA	1
(United Kingdom) Newbridge Motorsport	Aston Martin Vantage AMR GT4	27	(United Kingdom) Matt Topham	PA	1
(United Kingdom) Newbridge Motorsport	Aston Martin Vantage AMR GT4	27	(United Kingdom) Gus Bowers	PA	3
(United Kingdom) Newbridge Motorsport	Aston Martin Vantage AMR GT4	27	(Macau) Liu Lic Ka	PA	3
(Germany) BWT Mücke Motorsport	Mercedes-AMG GT4	28	(Mozambique) Rodrigo Almeida	S	3
(Germany) BWT Mücke Motorsport	Mercedes-AMG GT4	28	(Czech Republic) Josef Knopp	S	3
(Germany) BWT Mücke Motorsport	Mercedes-AMG GT4	38	(Norway) Emil Gjerdrum	S	3
(Germany) BWT Mücke Motorsport	Mercedes-AMG GT4	38	(Germany) Nico Göhler	S	3
(Germany) W&S Motorsport	Porsche 718 Cayman GT4 RS Clubsport	30	(Germany) Max Kronberg	PA	All
(Germany) W&S Motorsport	Porsche 718 Cayman GT4 RS Clubsport	30	(Germany) Hendrik Still	PA	All
(Germany) W&S Motorsport	Porsche 718 Cayman GT4 RS Clubsport	31	Sergey Titarenko	S	4
(Germany) W&S Motorsport	Porsche 718 Cayman GT4 RS Clubsport	31	(Cyprus) Vasily Vladykin	S	4
(Germany) W&S Motorsport	Porsche 718 Cayman GT4 RS Clubsport	31	Mikhail Loboda	PA	5
(Germany) W&S Motorsport	Porsche 718 Cayman GT4 RS Clubsport	31	Vasily Vladykin	PA	5
(Germany) W&S Motorsport	Porsche 718 Cayman GT4 RS Clubsport	32	(United States) Dakota Dickerson	PA	5–6
(Germany) W&S Motorsport	Porsche 718 Cayman GT4 RS Clubsport	32	(United States) Taylor Hagler	PA	5–6
(Germany) W&S Motorsport	Porsche 718 Cayman GT4 RS Clubsport	442	(Switzerland) Gustavo Xavier	PA	2–6
(Germany) W&S Motorsport	Porsche 718 Cayman GT4 RS Clubsport	442	(United States) Taylor Hagler	PA	2–4
(Germany) W&S Motorsport	Porsche 718 Cayman GT4 RS Clubsport	442	(United Kingdom) Charles Dawson	PA	5–6
(France) Code Racing Development	Alpine A110 GT4	35	(France) Sandro Perissoutti	S	All
(France) Code Racing Development	Alpine A110 GT4	35	(France) Emmanuel Guigou	S	1–2
(France) Code Racing Development	Alpine A110 GT4	35	(France) Vincent Beltoise	S	3
(France) Code Racing Development	Alpine A110 GT4	35	(Switzerland) Hugo de Sadeleer	S	4–6
(France) Code Racing Development	Alpine A110 GT4	36	(France) Antoine Leclerc	PA	All
(France) Code Racing Development	Alpine A110 GT4	36	(Switzerland) Loïc Villiger	PA	1–3
(France) Code Racing Development	Alpine A110 GT4	36	(France) Jean-Bernard Bouvet	PA	4–6
(France) GPA Racing	Aston Martin Vantage AMR GT4	39	(France) Valentin Hasse-Clot	PA	6
(France) GPA Racing	Aston Martin Vantage AMR GT4	39	(France) Baudouin Detout	PA	6
(France) GPA Racing	Aston Martin Vantage AMR GT4	48	(United Kingdom) Bailey Voisin	S	All
(France) GPA Racing	Aston Martin Vantage AMR GT4	48	(Lithuania) Kajus Siksnelis	S	1–2
(France) GPA Racing	Aston Martin Vantage AMR GT4	48	(France) Tom Verdier	S	3
(France) GPA Racing	Aston Martin Vantage AMR GT4	48	(Norway) Emil Heyerdahl	S	4–5
(France) GPA Racing	Aston Martin Vantage AMR GT4	48	(France) Louis Meric	S	6
(France) GPA Racing	Aston Martin Vantage AMR GT4	72	(France) Florent Grizaud	Am	All
(France) GPA Racing	Aston Martin Vantage AMR GT4	72	(France) Kévin Jimenez	Am	All
(France) Fullmotorsport	Audi R8 LMS GT4 Evo	45	(France) Noam Abramczyk	S	1–2
(France) Fullmotorsport	Audi R8 LMS GT4 Evo	45	(France) Romain Vozniak	S	1–2
(France) Fullmotorsport	Audi R8 LMS GT4 Evo	45	(France) Noam Abramczyk	PA	3–5
(France) Fullmotorsport	Audi R8 LMS GT4 Evo	45	(France) Romain Vozniak	PA	3–5
(France) Fullmotorsport	Audi R8 LMS GT4 Evo	46	(France) Sacha Bottemanne	S	1–4
(France) Fullmotorsport	Audi R8 LMS GT4 Evo	46	(France) Lonni Martins	S	1–4
(San Marino) W&D Racing Team	BMW M4 GT4 Gen II	53	(San Marino) Davide Meloni	Am	All
(San Marino) W&D Racing Team	BMW M4 GT4 Gen II	53	(Italy) Massimiliano Tresoldi	Am	1–4
(San Marino) W&D Racing Team	BMW M4 GT4 Gen II	53	(San Marino) Paolo Meloni	Am	5–6
(France) Autosport GP LS Group Performance	Alpine A110 GT4	55	(France) Alain Ferté	Am	All
(France) Autosport GP LS Group Performance	Alpine A110 GT4	55	(France) Laurent Hurgon	Am	All
(France) Autosport GP LS Group Performance	Alpine A110 GT4	110	(France) Paul Cauhaupé	S	All
(France) Autosport GP LS Group Performance	Alpine A110 GT4	110	(France) Simon Tirman	S	All
(France) AGS Events	Aston Martin Vantage AMR GT4	68	(France) Julien Lambert	Am	1
(France) AGS Events	Aston Martin Vantage AMR GT4	68	(France) Romano Ricci	Am	1
(France) AGS Events	Aston Martin Vantage AMR GT4	89	(France) Nicolas Gomar	PA	1–4
(France) AGS Events	Aston Martin Vantage AMR GT4	89	(France) Mike Parisy	PA	1–4
(France) AGS Events	Aston Martin Vantage AMR GT4	98	(France) Vincent Bouteiller	S	1–3
(France) AGS Events	Aston Martin Vantage AMR GT4	98	(France) Timothé Buret	S	1–3
(Switzerland) Centri Porsche Ticino	Porsche 718 Cayman GT4 RS Clubsport	75	(Switzerland) Ivan Jacoma	Am	All
(Switzerland) Centri Porsche Ticino	Porsche 718 Cayman GT4 RS Clubsport	75	(Switzerland) Nicolas Leutwiler	Am	All
(Switzerland) Centri Porsche Ticino	Porsche 718 Cayman GT4 RS Clubsport	76	(Switzerland) Alex Fontana	PA	3, 6
(Switzerland) Centri Porsche Ticino	Porsche 718 Cayman GT4 RS Clubsport	76	(Italy) Patrick Hofmann	PA	3, 6
(United Kingdom) Elite Motorsport with Entire Race Engineering	McLaren Artura GT4	77	(United Kingdom) Tom Emson	S	All
(United Kingdom) Elite Motorsport with Entire Race Engineering	McLaren Artura GT4	77	(United Kingdom) Josh Rattican	S	All
(United Kingdom) Elite Motorsport with Entire Race Engineering	McLaren Artura GT4	78	(United Kingdom) Michael Crees	PA	1–2
(United Kingdom) Elite Motorsport with Entire Race Engineering	McLaren Artura GT4	78	(United Kingdom) Jack Mitchell	PA	1–2
(United Kingdom) Elite Motorsport with Entire Race Engineering	McLaren Artura GT4	78	(Republic of Ireland) Alex Denning	S	3–6
(United Kingdom) Elite Motorsport with Entire Race Engineering	McLaren Artura GT4	78	(United Kingdom) Jack Mitchell	S	3–4, 6
(United Kingdom) Elite Motorsport with Entire Race Engineering	McLaren Artura GT4	78	(United Kingdom) Tom Lebbon	S	5
(France) Armada Racing	Mercedes-AMG GT4	87	(France) Jordan Grimaud	PA	1–3
(France) Armada Racing	Mercedes-AMG GT4	87	(France) Romain Monti	PA	1–3
(Germany) SRS Team Sorg Rennsport	Porsche 718 Cayman GT4 Clubsport MR	93	(Germany) Ricardo Dort	S	All
(Germany) SRS Team Sorg Rennsport	Porsche 718 Cayman GT4 Clubsport MR	93	(Spain) Sergio Paulet	S	All
(Germany) SRS Team Sorg Rennsport	Porsche 718 Cayman GT4 Clubsport MR	94	Ivan Ekelchik	S	All
(Germany) SRS Team Sorg Rennsport	Porsche 718 Cayman GT4 Clubsport MR	94	(Germany) Lion Düker	S	1–2
(Germany) SRS Team Sorg Rennsport	Porsche 718 Cayman GT4 Clubsport MR	94	(Switzerland) Felix Hirsiger	S	3
(Germany) SRS Team Sorg Rennsport	Porsche 718 Cayman GT4 Clubsport MR	94	(Denmark) Nicolaj Møller Madsen	S	4–6
(France) CSA Racing	Audi R8 LMS GT4 Evo	111	(France) Gaël Castelli	S	1–4
(France) CSA Racing	Audi R8 LMS GT4 Evo	111	(France) Alexandre Cougnaud	S	1–4
BMW Team France L'Espace Bienvenue	BMW M4 GT4 Gen II	117	(Netherlands) Ricardo van der Ende	S	1–3
BMW Team France L'Espace Bienvenue	BMW M4 GT4 Gen II	117	(Belgium) Benjamin Lessennes	S	1–3
(Sweden) Otto Racing	Porsche 718 Cayman GT4 RS Clubsport	204	(Sweden) Otto Gulberg	PA PA S	2–3
(Sweden) Otto Racing	Porsche 718 Cayman GT4 RS Clubsport	204	(Sweden) Daniel Nilsson	PA PA S	2–3
(Sweden) RMS	Mercedes-AMG GT4	221	(Sweden) Håkan Ricknas	Am PA S	2–3
(Sweden) RMS	Mercedes-AMG GT4	221	(Sweden) Calle Ward	Am PA S	2–3
Toyota Gazoo Racing Sweden	Toyota GR Supra GT4	229	(Sweden) Niclas Hedberg	PA PA S	2–3
Toyota Gazoo Racing Sweden	Toyota GR Supra GT4	229	(Sweden) Rasmus Hedberg	PA PA S	2–3
Toyota Gazoo Racing Sweden	Toyota GR Supra GT4 Evo	255	(Sweden) Mikael Brunnhagen	Am Am S	2
Toyota Gazoo Racing Sweden	Toyota GR Supra GT4 Evo	255	(Sweden) Andreas Ahlberg	Am Am S	2
Toyota Gazoo Racing Sweden	Toyota GR Supra GT4 Evo	255	(Sweden) Axel Bengtsson	PA PA S	3
Toyota Gazoo Racing Sweden	Toyota GR Supra GT4 Evo	255	(Sweden) Mikael Brunnhagen	PA PA S	3
Toyota Gazoo Racing Sweden	Toyota GR Supra GT4 Evo	290	(Sweden) Hans Holmlund	PA PA S	2–3
Toyota Gazoo Racing Sweden	Toyota GR Supra GT4 Evo	290	(Sweden) Emil Skaras	PA PA S	2–3
(Sweden) Race Team Gelleråsen by AFR	Porsche 718 Cayman GT4 RS Clubsport	278	(Sweden) Gustav Bard	Am Am S	2–3
(Sweden) Race Team Gelleråsen by AFR	Porsche 718 Cayman GT4 RS Clubsport	278	(Sweden) Patrik Skoog	Am Am S	2–3
(Sweden) ALFAB Racing	McLaren Artura GT4	288	(Sweden) Erik Behrens	PA PA S	2–3
(Sweden) ALFAB Racing	McLaren Artura GT4	288	(Sweden) Daniel Roos	PA PA S	2–3
(Sweden) M-Bilar Racing	BMW M4 GT4 Gen II	298	(Sweden) Victor Bouveng	PA PA S	2–3
(Sweden) M-Bilar Racing	BMW M4 GT4 Gen II	298	(Sweden) Joakim Walde	PA PA S	2–3

Icon	Class
S	Silver Cup
PA	Pro-Am Cup
PA S	Pro-Am Scandinavia
Am	Am Cup
Am S	Am Scandinavia

== Race calendar and results ==
Bold indicates the overall winner.

Round		Circuit	Date	Pole position	Silver Winners	Pro-Am Winners	Am Winners	GT4 Scandinavia Pro-Am Winners	GT4 Scandinavia Am Winners
1	R1	(Italy) Monza	22 April	(France) No. 3 Team Speedcar	**(France) No. 3 Team Speedcar**	(France) No. 36 Code Racing Development	(France) No. 10 AVR-Avvatar	No Entries	No Entries
1	R1	(Italy) Monza	22 April	(France) Benjamin Lariche (France) Robert Consani	**(France) Benjamin Lariche** **(France) Robert Consani**	(France) Antoine Leclerc (Switzerland) Loïc Villiger	(France) Julien Piguet (France) Alban Varutti	No Entries	No Entries
1	R2	(Italy) Monza	23 April	(Switzerland) No. 2 Hofor Racing by Bonk Motorsport	**(Switzerland) No. 2 Hofor Racing by Bonk Motorsport**	(France) No. 36 Code Racing Development	(France) No. 10 AVR-Avvatar	No Entries	No Entries
1	R2	(Italy) Monza	23 April	(Germany) Michael Schrey (Italy) Gabriele Piana	**(Germany) Michael Schrey** **(Italy) Gabriele Piana**	(France) Antoine Leclerc (Switzerland) Loïc Villiger	(France) Julien Piguet (France) Alban Varutti	No Entries	No Entries
2	R1	(France) Paul Ricard	3 June	(Switzerland) No. 74 Racing Spirit of Léman	**(Switzerland) No. 74 Racing Spirit of Léman**	(France) No. 42 Saintéloc Junior Team	(France) No. 10 AVR-Avvatar	(Sweden) No. 298 M-Bilar Racing	(Sweden) No. 221 RMS
2	R1	(France) Paul Ricard	3 June	(Switzerland) Konstantin Lachenauer (France) Victor Weyrich	**(Switzerland) Konstantin Lachenauer** **(France) Victor Weyrich**	(France) Grégory Guilvert (France) Christophe Hamon	(France) Alban Varutti	(Sweden) Victor Bouveng (Sweden) Joakim Walde	(Sweden) Håkan Ricknas (Sweden) Calle Ward
2	R2	(France) Paul Ricard	4 June	(Switzerland) No. 2 Hofor Racing by Bonk Motorsport	**(Belgium) No. 8 Xwift Racing Events**	(France) No. 36 Code Racing Development	(France) No. 10 AVR-Avvatar	No. 290 Toyota Gazoo Racing Sweden	(Sweden) No. 278 Race Team Gelleråsen by AFR
2	R2	(France) Paul Ricard	4 June	(Germany) Michael Schrey (Italy) Gabriele Piana	**(France) Etienne Cheli** **(Belgium) Antoine Potty**	(France) Antoine Leclerc (Switzerland) Loïc Villiger	(France) Alban Varutti	(Sweden) Hans Holmlund (Sweden) Emil Skaras	(Sweden) Gustav Bard (Sweden) Patrik Skoog
3	R1	(Belgium) Spa-Francorchamps	30 June	(France) No. 42 Saintéloc Junior Team	**(France) No. 117 L'Espace Bienvenue**	(France) No. 42 Saintéloc Junior Team	(France) No. 10 AVR-Avvatar	No. 290 Toyota Gazoo Racing Sweden	(Sweden) No. 221 RMS
3	R1	(Belgium) Spa-Francorchamps	30 June	(France) Grégory Guilvert (France) Christophe Hamon	**(Netherlands) Ricardo van der Ende** **(Belgium) Benjamin Lessennes**	(France) Grégory Guilvert (France) Christophe Hamon	(France) Alban Varutti	(Sweden) Hans Holmlund (Sweden) Emil Skaras	(Sweden) Håkan Ricknas (Sweden) Calle Ward
3	R2	(Belgium) Spa-Francorchamps	1 July	(Bulgaria) No. 23 Overdrive Racing	**(Belgium) No. 8 Xwift Racing Events**	(Germany) No. 18 TSR Team Spirit Racing	(Switzerland) No. 75 Centri Porsche Ticino	No. 290 Toyota Gazoo Racing Sweden	(Sweden) No. 278 Race Team Gelleråsen by AFR
3	R2	(Belgium) Spa-Francorchamps	1 July	(Bulgaria) Stefan Bostandjiev (Bulgaria) Pavel Lefterov	**(France) Etienne Cheli** **(Belgium) Antoine Potty**	(Germany) Markus Lugnstrass (Germany) Lorenz Stegmann	(Switzerland) Ivan Jacoma (Switzerland) Nicolas Leutwiler	(Sweden) Hans Holmlund (Sweden) Emil Skaras	(Sweden) Gustav Bard (Sweden) Patrik Skoog
4	R1	(Italy) Misano	15 July	(France) No. 3 Team Speedcar	**(Switzerland) No. 2 Hofor Racing by Bonk Motorsport**	(France) No. 42 Saintéloc Junior Team	(France) No. 10 AVR-Avvatar	No Entries	No Entries
4	R1	(Italy) Misano	15 July	(France) Benjamin Lariche (France) Robert Consani	**(Germany) Michael Schrey** **(Italy) Gabriele Piana**	(France) Grégory Guilvert (France) Christophe Hamon	(France) Julien Piguet (France) Alban Varutti	No Entries	No Entries
4	R2	(Italy) Misano	16 July	(France) No. 3 Team Speedcar	**(Turkey) No. 12 Borusan Otomotiv Motorsport**	(France) No. 42 Saintéloc Junior Team	(San Marino) No. 53 W&D Racing Team	No Entries	No Entries
4	R2	(Italy) Misano	16 July	(France) Benjamin Lariche (France) Robert Consani	**(Turkey) Berkay Besler** **(United Kingdom) Tom Edgar**	(France) Grégory Guilvert (France) Christophe Hamon	(San Marino) Davide Meloni (Italy) Massimiliano Tresoldi	No Entries	No Entries
5	R1	(Germany) Hockenheim	2 September	(Germany) No. 30 W&S Motorsport	(Germany) No. 22 Allied Racing	**(Germany) No. 30 W&S Motorsport**	(France) No. 10 AVR-Avvatar	No Entries	No Entries
5	R1	(Germany) Hockenheim	2 September	(Germany) Max Kronberg (Germany) Hendrik Still	(Denmark) Alexander Hartvig (Netherlands) Nathan Schaap	**(Germany) Max Kronberg** **(Germany) Hendrik Still**	(France) Julien Piguet (France) Alban Varutti	No Entries	No Entries
5	R2	(Germany) Hockenheim	3 September	(Netherlands) No. 17 V8 Racing	**(Germany) No. 22 Allied Racing**	(Germany) No. 30 W&S Motorsport	(France) No. 10 AVR-Avvatar	No Entries	No Entries
5	R2	(Germany) Hockenheim	3 September	(Netherlands) Dante Rappange (Belgium) Kenny Herremans	**(Denmark) Alexander Hartvig** **(Netherlands) Nathan Schaap**	(Germany) Max Kronberg (Germany) Hendrik Still	(France) Julien Piguet (France) Alban Varutti	No Entries	No Entries
6	R1	(Spain) Barcelona	30 September	(United Kingdom) No. 77 Elite Motorsport with Entire Race Engineering	**(United Kingdom) No. 77 Elite Motorsport with Entire Race Engineering**	(France) No. 36 Code Racing Development	(France) No. 55 Autosport GP LS Group Performance	No Entries	No Entries
6	R1	(Spain) Barcelona	30 September	(United Kingdom) Tom Emson (United Kingdom) Josh Rattican	**(United Kingdom) Tom Emson** **(United Kingdom) Josh Rattican**	(France) Antoine Leclerc (France) Jean-Bernard Bouvet	(France) Alain Ferté (France) Laurent Hurgon	No Entries	No Entries
6	R2	(Spain) Barcelona	1 October	(Switzerland) No. 2 Hofor Racing by Bonk Motorsport	**(Switzerland) No. 2 Hofor Racing by Bonk Motorsport**	(France) No. 42 Saintéloc Junior Team	(France) No. 10 AVR-Avvatar	No Entries	No Entries
6	R2	(Spain) Barcelona	1 October	(Germany) Michael Schrey (Italy) Gabriele Piana	**(Germany) Michael Schrey** **(Italy) Gabriele Piana**	(France) Grégory Guilvert (France) Christophe Hamon	(France) Julien Piguet (France) Alban Varutti	No Entries	No Entries

== Championship standings ==
=== Drivers' Championship ===
Pos.	Drivers	Team	MNZ (Italy)		LEC (France)		SPA (Belgium)		MIS (Italy)		HOC (Germany)		CAT (Spain)		Points
Silver Cup
1	(Germany) Michael Schrey (Italy) Gabriele Piana	(Switzerland) Hofor Racing by Bonk Motorsport	3	**1**	12	**2**	2	7	1	2	9	13	7	**1**	170
2	(France) Benjamin Lariche (France) Robert Consani	(France) Team Speedcar	**1**	Ret	3	Ret	54	2	**2**	**3**	42†	2	2	3	145
3	(Turkey) Berkay Besler (United Kingdom) Tom Edgar	(Turkey) Borusan Otomotiv Motorsport	2	3	7	15	6	3	4	1	15	8	10	30	117
4	(Belgium) Antoine Potty (France) Etienne Cheli	(Belgium) Xwift Racing Events	17	11	2	1	5	1	14	6	8	DNS	5	34†	109
5	(Netherlands) Nathan Schaap (Denmark) Alexander Hartvig	(Germany) Allied-Racing	8	4	16	Ret	9	28	8	20	**2**	1	12	32†	78
6	(Spain) Marc de Fulgencio	(Germany) BCMC Motorsport powered by EastSide Motorsport	9	6	4	4	28	51	Ret	5	4	12	20	13	64
7	(France) Victor Weyrich	(Switzerland) Racing Spirit of Léman	Ret	Ret	**1**	Ret	13	8	6	9	12	10	14	5	63
8	(France) Paul Cauhaupé (France) Simon Tirman	(France) Autosport GP LS Group Performance	12	9	6	19	DNS	DNS	Ret	11	3	7	6	7	59
9	(United Kingdom) Josh Rattican (United Kingdom) Tom Emson	(United Kingdom) Elite Motorsport with Entire Racing Engineering	7	35	Ret	5	25	40	20	26	5	14	**1**	37†	55
10	(Netherlands) Dante Rappange	(Netherlands) V8 Racing	11	2	26	24	17	DNS	5	8	41†	6	15	17	48
11	(Belgium) Kenny Herremans	(Netherlands) V8 Racing	11	2	26	24	17	DNS	5	8	41†	6			48
12	(France) Enzo Joulié (Turkey) Yagiz Gedik	(Turkey) Borusan Otomotiv Motorsport	5	5	22	34	10	19	7	4	27	DNS	9	Ret	48
13	(Germany) Marcel Lernez	(Germany) BCMC Motorsport powered by EastSide Motorsport	9	6	4	4	28	51	Ret	5					44
14	(United Kingdom) Jack Mitchell	(United Kingdom) Elite Motorsport with Entire Race Engineering			8	9	52	Ret	36	Ret			4	2	43
15	(United Arab Emirates) Jamie Day	(France) Mirage Racing	13	17	17	11	4	12	10	10	6	36†	37†	4	42
16	(United Kingdom) Ruben del Sarte	(France) Mirage Racing	18	13	17	11	4	12	10	10	6	36†	37†	4	42
17	Ivan Ekelchik	(Germany) SRS Team Sorg Rennsport	31	Ret	35	23	18	4	9	15	DSQ	4	21	8	35
18	(Republic of Ireland) Alex Denning	(United Kingdom) Elite Motorsport with Entire Race Engineering					52	Ret	36	Ret	29	23	4	2	33
19	(Ecuador) Mateo Villagómez	(Switzerland) Racing Spirit of Léman							6	9	12	10	14	5	32
20	(Switzerland) Konstantin Lachenauer	(Switzerland) Racing Spirit of Léman	Ret	Ret	**1**	Ret	13	8							31
21	(Spain) Lluc Ibáñez (United States) Alexandre Papadoupulos	(Spain) NM Racing Team	Ret	DNS	14	25	20	6	3	13	25	15	11	11	30
22	(France) Gaël Castelli (France) Alexandre Cougnaud	(France) CSA Racing	4	7	10	7	22	15	13	14					30
23	(Netherlands) Ricardo van der Ende (Belgium) Benjamin Lessennes	(France) L'Espace Bienvenue					1	24							25
24	(Denmark) Nicolaj Møller Madsen	(Germany) SRS Team Sorg Rennsport							9	15	DSQ	4	21	8	23
25	(Germany) Philipp Gogollok	(Germany) BCMC Motorsport powered by EastSide Motorsport									4	12	20	13	20
26	(France) Sandro Perissoutti	(France) Code Racing Development	32	31	36	3	44	29	25	32	16	32	27	12	17
27	(Switzerland) Hugo de Sadeleer	(France) Code Racing Development			36	3			25	32	16	32	27	12	17
28	(France) Louis Meric	(France) Mirage Racing	6	8	Ret	16	15	16	Ret	12			35†	22	12
29	(France) Romain Carton	(France) Mirage Racing	6	8	Ret	16	15	16	Ret	12					12
30	(Switzerland) Felix Hersiner	(Germany) SRS Team Sorg Rennsport					18	4							12
31	(France) Lonni Martins (France) Sacha Bottemanne	(France) FULLMOTORSPORT	15	39	18	26	35	5							10
32	(United Kingdom) William Jenkins	(United Kingdom) Elite Motorsport with Entire Race Engineering			8	9									10
33	(Bulgaria) Stefan Bostandjiev (Bulgaria) Pavel Lefterov	(Bulgaria) Overdrive Racing	25	12	21	18	7	13	Ret	Ret	Ret	18	18	15	9
34	(Germany) Ricardo Dort (Spain) Sergio Paulet	(Germany) SRS Team Sorg Rennsport	36	25	33	8	21	22	28	Ret	13	17	36†	DNS	8
35	(United Kingdom) Bailey Voisin	(France) GPA Racing	26	22	Ret	30	Ret	9	15	17	24	29			2
35	(United Kingdom) Bailey Voisin	(France) Mirage Racing											35†	22	2
36	(France) Tom Verdier	(France) GPA Racing					Ret	9							2
37	(Czech Republic) Josef Knopp (Mozambique) Rodrigo Almeida	(Germany) BWT Mücke Motorsport					12	20							2
38	(Belgium) Stéphane Lémeret (France) Corentin Tierce	(France) TGR CMR					24	11							1
39	(France) Florian Briché (France) Julien Briché	(France) JSB Compétition					**14**	35	35	19	17	31			1
-	(United States) Rory van der Steur	(France) Mirage Racing	13	17											0
-	(Sweden) Andreas Bäckman (Sweden) Jessica Bäckman	(Germany) Prosport Racing	16	34											0
-	(Norway) Emil Heyerdahl	(France) Mirage Racing	18	13											0
-	(Norway) Emil Heyerdahl	(France) GPA Racing							15	17					0
-	(Lithuania) Kajus Siksnelis	(France) GPA Racing	26	22											0
-	(France) Timothé Buret (France) Vincent Bouteiller	(France) AGS Events	30	Ret	32	20	26	23							0
-	(Germany) Lion Düker	(Germany) SRS Team Sorg Rennsport	31	Ret	35	23									0
-	(France) Emmanuel Guigou	(France) Code Racing Development	32	31											0
-	(France) Paul Petit (Spain) Marc Lopez	(France) Saintéloc Junior Team	34	15	Ret	WD			24						0
-	(Sweden) Andreas Bäckman (Sweden) Jessica Bäckman	(Germany) racing one			Ret	WD	40	26	Ret	22					0
-	(United Kingdom) Josh Miller	(France) GPA Racing			Ret	30									0
-	(Norway) Emil Gjerdrum (Germany) Nico Göhler	(Germany) BWT Mücke Motorsport					38	34							0
-	(France) Vincent Beltoise	(France) Code Racing Development					44	29							0
-	Sergey Titarenko (Cyprus) Vasily Vladykin	(Germany) W&S Motorsport							26	27					0
Pro-Am Cup
1	(France) Grégory Guilvert (France) Christophe Hamon	(France) Saintéloc Junior Team	**10**	16	**5**	22	3	Ret	11	7	7	11	8	**6**	234
2	(France) Antoine Leclerc	(France) Code Racing Development	38	10	13	10	11	38	21	36	14	9	3	10	169
3	(Germany) Max Kronberg (Germany) Hendrik Still	(Germany) W&S Motorsport			15	17	8	14	22	35	**1**	3	Ret	Ret	124
4	(Germany) Lorenz Stegmann (Germany) Markus Lungstrass	(Germany) TSR Team Spirit Racing	Ret	23	27	21	27	10	16	30	34	WD	31	20	100
5	(Germany) Denis Bulatov (Germany) Lukas Mayer	(Germany) AGS Events	29	Ret	20	36	36	39	12	16	11	21	16	36†	100
6	(Switzerland) Loïc Villiger	(France) Code Racing Development	38	10	13	10	11	38							88
7	(France) Jean-Bernard Bouvet	(France) Code Racing Development							21	36	14	9	3	10	81
8	(France) Noam Abramczyk (France) Romain Vozniak	(France) FULLMOTORSPORT	27	24	24	32	Ret	18	Ret	23					58
9	(Spain) Filip Vava	(Spain) NM Racing Team	40	19	28	43	46	31	18	21	32	24	33	35†	58
10	(Czech Republic) Jakub Knoll	(Spain) NM Racing Team	40	19	28	43	46	31	18	21	32	24			58
11	(Denmark) Oskar Lind Kristensen (United States) Jordan Wallace	(Germany) Allied-Racing	20	38	49	Ret	Ret	Ret	29	Ret	18	16	26	23	57
12	(Fédération Internationale de l'Automobile) Stanislav Safronov (Fédération Internationale de l'Automobile) Aleksandr Vaintrub	(Spain) NM Racing Team	23	28	29	Ret	37	25	19	33	20	22	DNS	DNS	55
13	(France) Mike Parisy (France) Nicolas Gomar	(France) AGS Events	28	36	DNS	12	41	17	34	31					47
14	(India) Akhil Rabindra (Belgium) Rodrigue Gillion	(Switzerland) Racing Spirit of Léman	37	27	25	28	29	33	27	Ret	38	27	Ret	WD	44
15	(France) Florian Briché (France) Julien Briché	(France) JSB Compétition	22	26	19	33									40
16	(France) Paul Petit	(France) Saintéloc Junior Team					34	Ret	24	Ret	21	DNS	24	21	36
17	(France) Anthony Beltoise (France) Cyril Saleilles	(France) Saintéloc Junior Team	Ret	29	39	47	30	46	30	29	19	28	32	28	33
18	(United States) Taylor Hagler	(Germany) W&S Motorsport			37	37	42	30	31	25	40†	Ret	28	31	27
19	(France) Valentin Hasse-Clot (France) Baudouin Detout	(France) GPA Racing											25	19	25
20	(France) Grégory Curson Faessel	(France) Saintéloc Junior Team											24	21	22
21	(Switzerland) Gustavo Xavier	(Germany) W&S Motorsport			37	37	42	30	31	25					19
22	(Spain) Marc Lopez	(France) Saintéloc Junior Team					34	Ret	24	Ret	21	DNS			14
23	(United States) Dakota Dickerson	(Germany) W&S Motorsport									40†	Ret	28	31	8
24	(France) Jim Pla (France) Jean-Luc Beauelique	(France) Team Speedcar											**Ret**	27	7
25	(Switzerland) Alex Fontana (Italy) Patrick Hofmann	(Switzerland) Centri Porsche Ticino					Ret	DNS					30	33	5
26	Mikhail Loboda; Vasily Vladykin	(Germany) W&S Motorsport									28	**DNS**			3
27	(United Kingdom) Jack Mitchell (United Kingdom) Michael Crees	(United Kingdom) Elite Motorsport with Entire Race Engineering	Ret	**Ret**											1
-	(France) Romain Monti (France) Jordan Grimaud	(France) Armada Racing	Ret	Ret	40	38									0
-	(Republic of Ireland) Alex Denning (United Kingdom) Matt Topham	(United Kingdom) Newbridge Motorsport	Ret	DNS											0
-	(United Kingdom) Gus Bowers (Macau) Liu Lic Ka	(United Kingdom) Newbridge Motorsport					50	41							0
Am Cup
1	(France) Alban Varutti	(France) AVR-Avvatar	14	**14**	9	6	19	36	17	24	**10**	**5**	**22**	**9**	282
2	(France) Julien Piguet	(France) AVR-Avvatar	14	**14**					17	24	**10**	**5**	**22**	**9**	189
3	(France) Laurent Hurgon (France) Alain Ferté	(France) Autosport GP LS Group Performance	**19**	18	**11**	29	31	42	Ret	Ret	39†	30	13	18	158
4	(San Marino) Davide Meloni	(San Marino) W&D Racing Team	24	21	41	40	39	50	Ret	18	22	20	17	16	154
5	(France) Kévin Jimenez (France) Florent Grizaud	(France) GPA Racing	33	20	23	27	32	43	23	Ret	23	26	34	24	148
6	(Switzerland) Ivan Jacoma (Switzerland) Nicolas Leutwiler	(Switzerland) Centri Porsche Ticino		30	34	31	33	27	33	28	31	25	23	26	140
7	(France) Jean-Paul Dominici (France) Jean-Mathieu Leandri	(France) CHAZEL Technologie Course	35	33	38	42	45	44	32	34	33	35†	29	25	105
8	(Italy) Massimiliano Tresoldi	(San Marino) W&D Racing Team	24	21	41	40	39	50	Ret	18					85
9	(San Marino) Paolo Meloni	(San Marino) W&D Racing Team									22	20	17	16	69
10	(Bulgaria) Joachim Bölting	(Bulgaria) Overdrive Racing	39	37	48	41	Ret	Ret			35	34	Ret	29	40
11	(Switzerland) Gustavo Xavier (United Kingdom) Charles Dawson	(Germany) W&S Motorsport									30	19	Ret	WD	30
12	(Bulgaria) Ivailo Tzonev	(Bulgaria) Overdrive Racing	39	37	48	41	Ret	Ret					Ret	29	30
13	(France) Fabien Boeri	(France) Team Speedcar	21	40	Ret	WD					37	33			27
14	(France) Hugo Roch	(France) Team Speedcar	21	40	Ret	WD									17
15	(France) Julien Lambert	(France) AGS Events	41	32											12
16	(France) Julien Rodrigues	(France) Team Speedcar									37	33			10
17	(Bulgaria) Tano Neumann	(Bulgaria) Overdrive Racing									35	34			10
18	(France) Romano Ricci	(France) AGS Events	41												4

Colour	Result
Gold	Winner
Silver	Second place
Bronze	Third place
Green	Points classification
Blue	Non-points classification
Blue	Non-classified finish (NC)
Purple	Retired, not classified (Ret)
Red	Did not qualify (DNQ)
Red	Did not pre-qualify (DNPQ)
Black	Disqualified (DSQ)
White	Did not start (DNS)
White	Withdrew (WD)
White	Race cancelled (C)
Blank	Did not practice (DNP)
Blank	Did not arrive (DNA)
Blank	Excluded (EX)

**Bold** indicates pole position
