= 2022 STCC TCR Scandinavia Touring Car Championship =

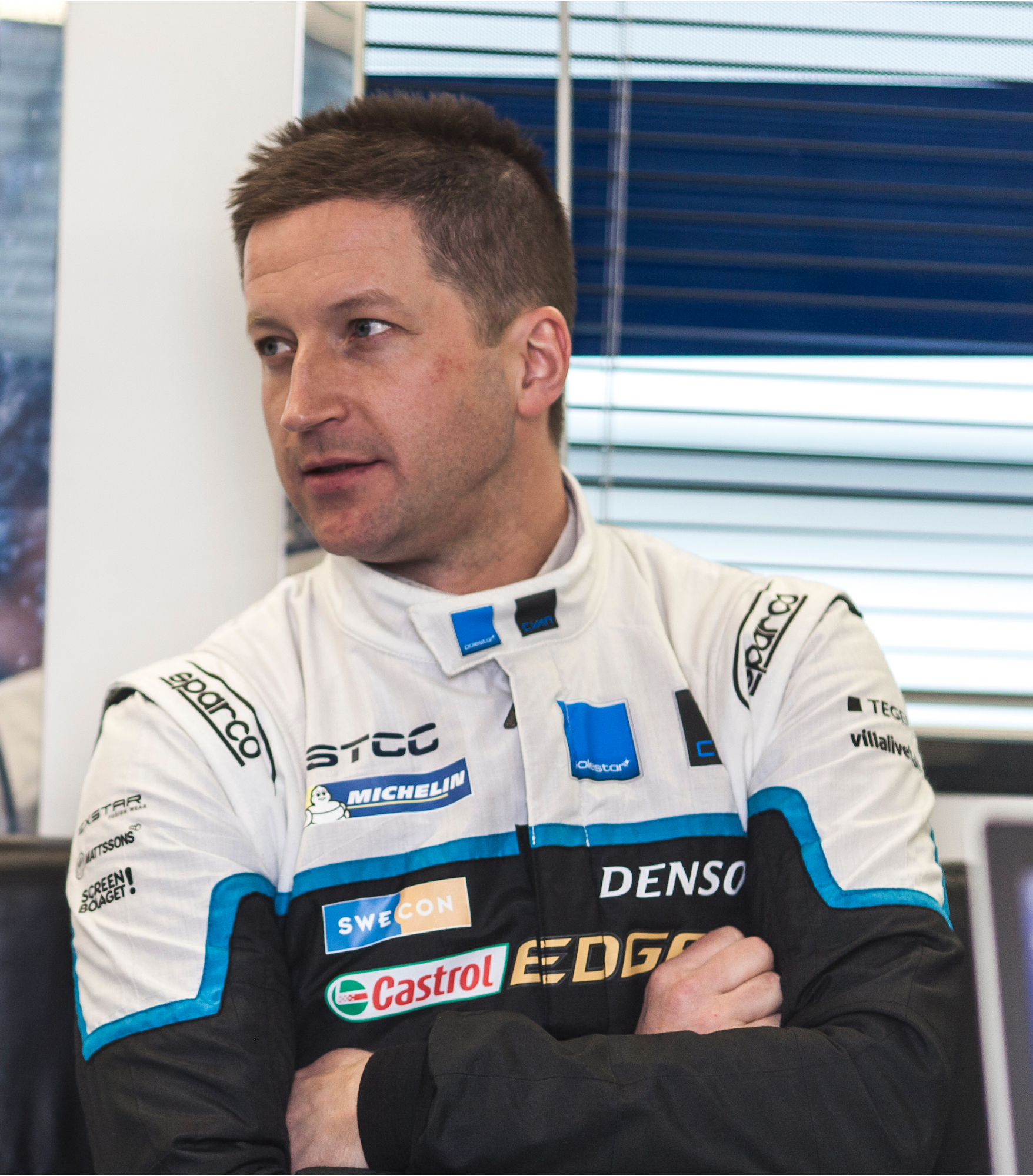
Robert Dahlgren is the reigning Drivers' Champion.

The 2022 STCC TCR Scandinavia Touring Car Championship was the thirteenth season of the championship, the sixth after the adoption of the TCR specification. It started on 4 June 2022 at Ljungbyheds Motorbana and finished on 1 October 2022 at Mantorp Park. Robert Dahlgren, in the CUPRA Leon Competición TCR, took his fourth drivers' title in his career, while his team, CUPRA Dealer Team - PWR Racing, took the team title. Axel Bengtsson, also in a CUPRA Leon Competición TCR, took the junior drivers' title, while Marius Solberg Hansen, in a Volkswagen Golf GTI TCR, took the Däckteam trophy.

== Teams and drivers ==
| Entrant | Car | Race drivers | | |
| Entrant | Car | No. | Driver name | Rounds |
|---|---|---|---|---|
| (Sweden) CUPRA Dealer Team – PWR Racing | Cupra León Competición TCR | 2 | (Sweden) Robert Dahlgren | All |
| (Sweden) CUPRA Dealer Team – PWR Racing | Cupra León Competición TCR | 55 | (Sweden) Axel Bengtsson | All |
| (Sweden) Lestrup Racing Team | Audi RS 3 LMS TCR (2021) | 7 | (Sweden) Oliver Söderström | All |
| (Sweden) Lestrup Racing Team | Audi RS 3 LMS TCR (2021) | 19 | (Sweden) Andreas Bäckman | All |
| (Sweden) Team Auto Lounge Racing | Audi RS 3 LMS TCR (2017) | 13 | (Sweden) Christian Skaar | All |
| (Sweden) Team Auto Lounge Racing | Audi RS 3 LMS TCR (2017) | 31 | (Sweden) Johan Lund | 3–6 |
| (Sweden) Team Strandberg | Volkswagen Golf GTI TCR | 14 | (Sweden) Dennis Strandberg | All |
| (Sweden) Exion Racing | Audi RS 3 LMS TCR (2021) | 16 | (Sweden) Calle Bergman | All |
| (Sweden) Exion Racing | Audi RS 3 LMS TCR (2021) | 70 | (Sweden) Isac Aronsson | All |
| (Sweden) MA:GP | Lynk & Co 03 TCR | 20 | (Sweden) Mattias Andersson | All |
| (Norway) Esbjug Motorsport | Honda Civic Type R TCR (FK8) | 23 | (Norway) Didrik Esbjug | All |
| (Norway) MSH Motorsport | Volkswagen Golf GTI TCR | 24 | (Norway) Marius Solberg Hansen | All |
| (Sweden) FH Racing | Cupra León TCR | 33 | (Sweden) Rasmus Hedberg | All |
| (Sweden) Brovallen Design | Audi RS 3 LMS TCR (2017) | 66 | (Sweden) Erik Olson Hermansson | 6 |
| (Sweden) Brink Motorsport | Audi RS 3 LMS TCR (2021) | 69 | (Sweden) Hugo Nerman | All |
| (Sweden) Brink Motorsport | Audi RS 3 LMS TCR (2021) | 71 | (Sweden) Tobias Brink | All |
| (Sweden) Lights2Flag | Audi RS 3 LMS TCR (2017) | 77 | (Sweden) Dejan Dragicevic | 1 |

== Race calendar and results ==
| Round | | Circuit | Location | Date | Pole position | Fastest lap | Race winner | Winning team |
|---|---|---|---|---|---|---|---|---|
| 1 | R1 | (Sweden) Ljungbyheds Motorbana | Ljungbyhed, Skåne | 4 June | (Sweden) Robert Dahlgren | (Sweden) Robert Dahlgren | (Sweden) Robert Dahlgren | (Sweden) Cupra Dealer Team – PWR Racing |
| 2 | R1 | (Sweden) Drivecenter Arena | Skellefteå, Västerbotten | 18 June | (Sweden) Andreas Bäckman | (Sweden) Robert Dahlgren | (Sweden) Andreas Bäckman | (Sweden) Lestrup Racing Team |
| 2 | R2 | (Sweden) Drivecenter Arena | Skellefteå, Västerbotten | 18 June | (Sweden) Mattias Andersson | (Sweden) Mattias Andersson | (Sweden) Hugo Nerman | (Sweden) Brink Motorsport |
| 2 | R3 | (Sweden) Drivecenter Arena | Skellefteå, Västerbotten | 18 June | | (Sweden) Robert Dahlgren | (Sweden) Robert Dahlgren | (Sweden) Cupra Dealer Team – PWR Racing |
| 3 | R1 | (Sweden) Ring Knutstorp | Kågeröd, Skåne | 23 July | (Sweden) Robert Dahlgren | (Sweden) Robert Dahlgren | (Sweden) Robert Dahlgren | (Sweden) Cupra Dealer Team – PWR Racing |
| 3 | R2 | (Sweden) Ring Knutstorp | Kågeröd, Skåne | 23 July | (Sweden) Robert Dahlgren | (Sweden) Robert Dahlgren | (Sweden) Robert Dahlgren | (Sweden) Cupra Dealer Team – PWR Racing |
| 3 | R3 | (Sweden) Ring Knutstorp | Kågeröd, Skåne | 23 July | | (Sweden) Andreas Bäckman | (Sweden) Robert Dahlgren | (Sweden) Cupra Dealer Team – PWR Racing |
| 4 | R1 | (Sweden) Gelleråsen Arena | Karlskoga, Örebro | 20 August | (Sweden) Oliver Söderström | (Sweden) Oliver Söderström | (Sweden) Oliver Söderström | (Sweden) Lestrup Racing Team |
| 4 | R2 | (Sweden) Gelleråsen Arena | Karlskoga, Örebro | 20 August | (Sweden) Mattias Andersson | (Sweden) Mattias Andersson | (Sweden) Mattias Andersson | (Sweden) MA:GP |
| 4 | R3 | (Sweden) Gelleråsen Arena | Karlskoga, Örebro | 20 August | | (Sweden) Robert Dahlgren | (Sweden) Robert Dahlgren | (Sweden) Cupra Dealer Team – PWR Racing |
| 5 | R1 | (Sweden) Anderstorp Raceway | Anderstorp, Jönköping | 11 September | (Sweden) Hugo Nerman | (Sweden) Andreas Bäckman | (Sweden) Andreas Bäckman | (Sweden) Lestrup Racing Team |
| 5 | R2 | (Sweden) Anderstorp Raceway | Anderstorp, Jönköping | 11 September | (Sweden) Andreas Bäckman | (Sweden) Calle Bergman | (Sweden) Andreas Bäckman | (Sweden) Lestrup Racing Team |
| 5 | R3 | (Sweden) Anderstorp Raceway | Anderstorp, Jönköping | 11 September | | (Sweden) Tobias Brink | (Sweden) Tobias Brink | (Sweden) Brink Motorsport |
| 6 | R1 | (Sweden) Mantorp Park | Mantorp, Östergötland | 1 October | (Sweden) Tobias Brink | (Sweden) Tobias Brink | (Sweden) Oliver Söderström | (Sweden) Lestrup Racing Team |
| 6 | R2 | (Sweden) Mantorp Park | Mantorp, Östergötland | 1 October | (Sweden) Tobias Brink | (Sweden) Tobias Brink | (Sweden) Tobias Brink | (Sweden) Brink Motorsport |
| 6 | R3 | (Sweden) Mantorp Park | Mantorp, Östergötland | 1 October | | (Sweden) Andreas Bäckman | (Sweden) Axel Bengtsson | (Sweden) Cupra Dealer Team – PWR Racing |

== Championship standings ==
This year's scoring system, with points now being handed to the top 15 finishers.

| Position | **1st** | **2nd** | **3rd** | **4th** | **5th** | **6th** | **7th** | **8th** | **9th** | **10th** | **11th** | **12th** | **13th** | **14th** | **15th** |
| Qualifying 2 | 5 | 4 | 3 | 2 | 1 | —N/a | | | | | | | | | |
| Race | 20 | 17 | 15 | 13 | 11 | 10 | 9 | 8 | 7 | 6 | 5 | 4 | 3 | 2 | 1 |

=== Drivers' Championship ===
| Pos. | Driver | LJU (Sweden) | SKE (Sweden) | | | KNU (Sweden) | | | GEL (Sweden) | | | AND (Sweden) | | | MAN (Sweden) | | | Pts |
| Pos. | Driver | RDU | RD1 | RD2 | RD3 | RD1 | RD2 | RD3 | RD1 | RD2 | RD3 | RD1 | RD2 | RD3 | RD1 | RD2 | RD3 | Pts |
|---|---|---|---|---|---|---|---|---|---|---|---|---|---|---|---|---|---|---|
| 1 | (Sweden) Robert Dahlgren | 1^{1} | DSQ | 7 | 1 | 1 | 1^{1} | 1 | 2 | 8^{2} | 1 | 2 | 3^{4} | 2 | 3 | 4^{2} | 3 | 266 |
| 2 | (Sweden) Tobias Brink | 2^{3} | 3 | 6^{5} | 2 | 7 | 2^{5} | 7 | 5 | 3^{5} | 3 | 10 | 7^{5} | 1 | 2 | 1^{1} | 7 | 228 |
| 3 | (Sweden) Andreas Bäckman | 5 | 1 | 5^{2} | 12 | 4 | 4^{2} | 2 | 3 | 5 | 2 | 1 | 1^{1} | 6 | Ret | 6 | 2 | 222 |
| 4 | (Sweden) Mattias Andersson | 7 | 4 | 2^{1} | 4 | 3 | 7 | 5 | 4 | 1^{1} | 5 | 3 | 5 | 3 | 8 | 3^{5} | 5 | 217 |
| 5 | (Sweden) Oliver Söderström | 3^{2} | 2 | 3^{4} | 3 | 2 | 5^{4} | 6 | 1 | Ret^{3} | 6 | 4 | 6 | DSQ | 1 | 2^{3} | 14 | 204 |
| 6 | (Sweden) Axel Bengtsson | 6 | 7 | 4 | 8 | 5 | 3^{3} | 4 | 7 | 4 | 7 | 5 | 4^{2} | 5 | 5 | 8 | 1 | 191 |
| 7 | (Sweden) Hugo Nerman | 4^{4} | 5 | 1 | 5 | 9 | Ret | 8 | 6 | 2^{4} | 9 | 8 | 2^{3} | 4 | 4 | 5^{4} | 4 | 188 |
| 8 | (Sweden) Isac Aronsson | 9^{5} | 6 | 8 | 6 | 8 | 8 | Ret | 13 | 9 | 10 | 6 | 13 | 12 | 6 | 9 | 6 | 112 |
| 9 | (Norway) Marius Solberg Hansen | Ret | 8 | 9 | 7 | 6 | 6 | 3 | 9 | Ret | 8 | 7 | 8 | 13 | 9 | 14 | 10 | 109 |
| 10 | (Norway) Didrik Esbjug | 11 | 11 | 10 | 10 | 12 | 10 | 9 | 8 | 7 | 4 | 14 | 12 | 8 | 11 | 10 | 9 | 96 |
| 11 | (Sweden) Rasmus Hedberg | 13 | 9 | 11 | Ret | 13 | 11 | 12 | 10 | 11 | 11 | 11 | 10 | 11 | 12 | 12 | 11 | 72 |
| 12 | (Sweden) Calle Bergman | 10 | 12 | Ret^{3} | 9 | Ret | 9 | 11 | DSQ | 10 | 13 | 13 | 14 | 10 | 14 | 7 | 8 | 67 |
| 13 | (Sweden) Christian Skaar | Ret | 10 | 12 | 11 | 11 | Ret | 13 | Ret | 12 | 14 | 12 | 9 | 9 | 7 | 13 | Ret | 59 |
| 14 | (Sweden) Dennis Strandberg | 8 | 13 | 13 | 13 | 10 | 13 | 10 | 11 | 6 | 15 | 9 | 15 | 7 | DNS | DNS | DSQ | 52 |
| 15 | (Sweden) Johan Lund | | | | | 14 | 12 | 14 | 12 | 13 | 12 | 15 | 11 | 14 | 10 | 15 | 13 | 30 |
| 16 | (Sweden) Erik Olsson Hermansson | | | | | | | | | | | | | | 13 | 11 | 12 | 12 |
| 17 | (Sweden) Dejan Dragicevic | 12 | | | | | | | | | | | | | | | | 4 |

| Colour | Result |
|---|---|
| Gold | Winner |
| Silver | Second place |
| Bronze | Third place |
| Green | Points classification |
| Blue | Non-points classification |
| Blue | Non-classified finish (NC) |
| Purple | Retired, not classified (Ret) |
| Red | Did not qualify (DNQ) |
| Red | Did not pre-qualify (DNPQ) |
| Black | Disqualified (DSQ) |
| White | Did not start (DNS) |
| White | Withdrew (WD) |
| White | Race cancelled (C) |
| Blank | Did not practice (DNP) |
| Blank | Did not arrive (DNA) |
| Blank | Excluded (EX) |

**Bold** – Pole
Italics – Fastest Lap
† — Did not finish, but classified
