= FIA WTCR Race of Portugal =

Motor racing event held in Portugal

- Circuito Internacional de Vila Real (2015–2019, 2022)
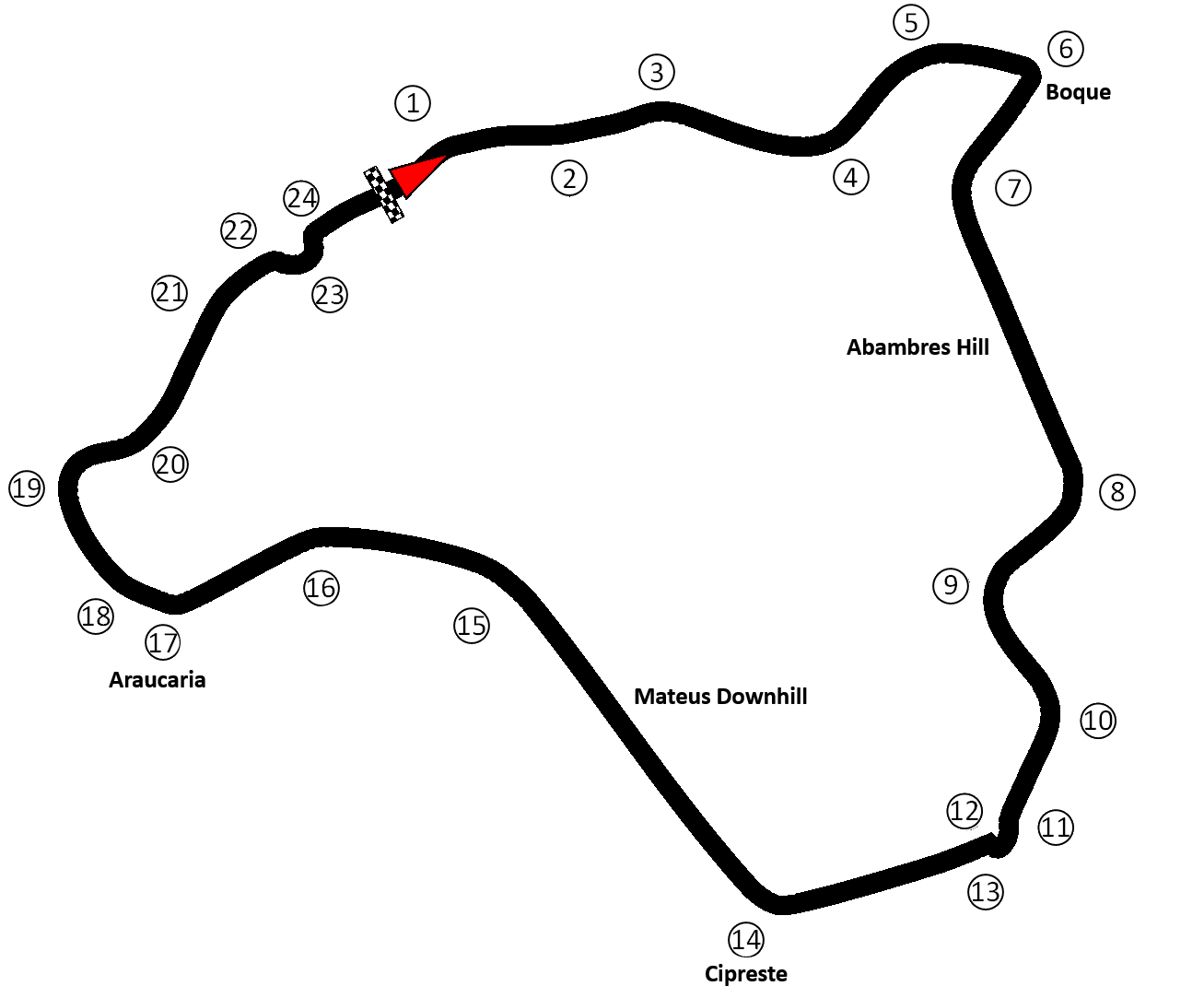

Race information
- Number of times held: 14
- First held: 2007
- Last held: 2022
- Most wins (drivers): (Portugal) Tiago Monteiro (4)
- Most wins (constructors): (United States) Chevrolet (8)

Last race (2022)
- Race 1 Winner: (Uruguay) Santiago Urrutia; (Cyan Performance Lynk & Co)
- Race 2 Winner: (United Kingdom) Robert Huff; (Zengő Motorsport)

The FIA WTCR Race of Portugal (known as the FIA WTCC Race of Portugal from 2007 to 2017) is a motor racing event held in Portugal as part of the World Touring Car Cup (WTCR) series, and formerly the World Touring Car Championship (WTCC). First run in 2007, the event last took place at the Autódromo do Estoril in June 2021; previously it has been held at the Circuito Internacional de Vila Real, the Circuito da Boavista, and the Autódromo Internacional do Algarve. The event will return to Circuito Internacional de Vila Real in 2022.

In common with the other rounds of the WTCR and the former WTCC, the Race of Portugal event consists of two practice sessions, a single qualifying session, and two individual races over the course of a weekend. For 2018 and 2019 seasons the event consisted of three races. Tiago Monteiro is the only Portuguese driver to have won his home race. He has taken four victories in Portugal, firstly in 2008 when the race was held at Estoril, then in race one of the 2010 Race of Portugal at Portimão, and two at Vila Real, the main race in 2016 Race of Portugal and race 3 in 2019 (never won at his hometown - Porto).

== History ==
The inaugural WTCC Race of Portugal was held in July 2007 at the Circuito da Boavista street course in Porto. The Boavista circuit had previously hosted the Formula One Portuguese Grand Prix in 1958 and 1960, and was revived as a historic racing venue in 2005. With a length of 4.72 km (2.93 mi), the track was one of the longest on the World Touring Car Championship calendar. As per the sporting regulations of the series, the Race of Portugal consisted of two separate races 50 kilometres (31 mi) long; the inaugural event held in 2007 saw Alain Menu win the first race, while Andy Priaulx took victory in the second. The Boavista circuit subsequently hosted the Race of Portugal on a biennial basis until 2013, with the Porto municipal government only able hold the event in alternating years due to the financial and logistical challenges from being host. The intervening years saw the Autódromo do Estoril assume hosting duties in 2008, where Rickard Rydell and Tiago Monteiro took the event's two victories respectively, before the 4.6 km (2.9 mi) Autódromo Internacional do Algarve in Portimão took over for the rounds in 2010 and 2012.

In October 2014, the Porto municipal government announced that the Circuito da Boavista would not host the Race of Portugal in 2015 after Turismo de Portugal, the country's national tourism board, chose not to provide financial support towards the €3 million cost. It was later announced that the city of Vila Real would host the event in 2015, utilising the 4.78 km (2.97 mi) Circuito Internacional de Vila Real street circuit first constructed in 1931 for a three-year deal until 2017. Despite receiving a broadly positive reception from the drivers, the circuit drew criticism over the placement of tight chicanes for safety reasons before the circuit's high speed sections, which brought racing speeds down to as low as 26 mph (42 km/h). In 2017 the event was the first in the World Touring Car Championship to feature a joker lap, an alternative route constructed at the final corner of the circuit through which drivers were required to drive once per race. An incident in the practice session for that year's event, in which driver Tom Coronel collided with an emergency vehicle down an escape road, prompted an investigation by the championship's governing body, the FIA.

In 2018 the World Touring Car Championship merged with TCR International Series to form the World Touring Car Cup. Both the Race of Portugal and the Circuito Internacional de Vila Real were retained by the series organisers, and in common with the other rounds of the championship, the number of races that formed the event was increased from two to three. The first race of 2018 saw a violent first-lap collision between Mehdi Bennani and Robert Huff block the entirety of the track, causing a delay of two hours while repair work to the cars and track-side barriers was undertaken. In 2020 the event was one of many cancelled due the COVID-19 pandemic, but was set to return to the Vila Real circuit for the 2021 season. The number of races held as part of the event will be reduced from three to two from 2021 with race lengths of 55 kilometres (34 mi) and 62 kilometres (39 mi) respectively.

On 10 May 2021, it was announced that Race of Portugal will be held in Circuito do Estoril instead of the Vila Real circuit; but 3-year agreement will be signed with the Vila Real circuit from the 2022 season. With the new TCR World Tour format, the Race of Portugal will be part of both the TCR World Tour and TCR European Series.

== Winners ==
Estoril circuit, which held races in 2008 and 2021

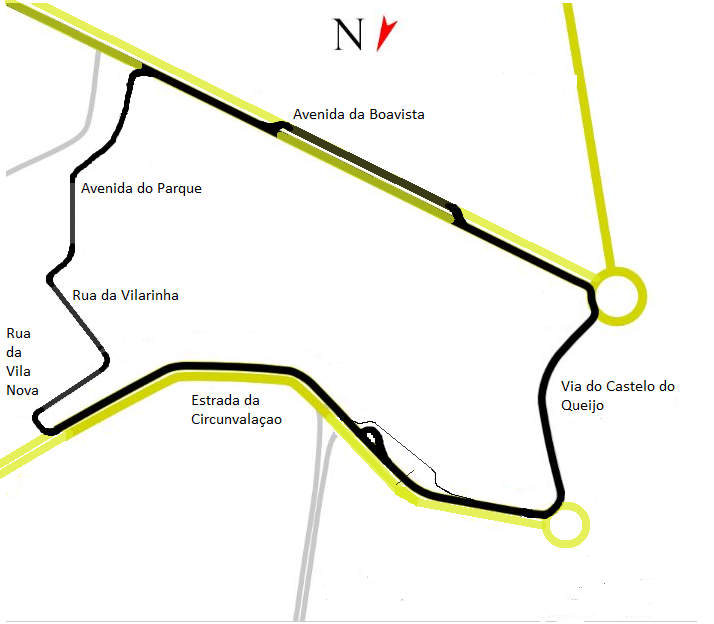
Boavista circuit, which held races in 2007, 2009, 2011, and 2013

Portimão circuit, which held races in 2010 and 2012

=== World Touring Car Cup (2018–2022) ===
| Year | Race | Driver | Manufacturer | Circuit | Report | Ref. |
|---|---|---|---|---|---|---|
| 2022 | Race 1 | (Uruguay) Santiago Urrutia | (Sweden) Lynk & Co | Vila Real | Report | |
| 2022 | Race 2 | (United Kingdom) Robert Huff | (Spain) CUPRA | Vila Real | Report | |
| 2021 | Race 1 | (France) Yann Ehrlacher | (Sweden) Lynk & Co | Estoril | Report | |
| 2021 | Race 2 | (Hungary) Attila Tassi | (Japan) Honda | Estoril | Report | |
| 2020 | Not held due to the COVID-19 pandemic. | | | | | |
| 2019 | Race 1 | (Hungary) Norbert Michelisz | (South Korea) Hyundai | Vila Real | Report | |
| 2019 | Race 2 | (Spain) Mikel Azcona | (Spain) Cupra | Vila Real | Report | |
| 2019 | Race 3 | (Portugal) Tiago Monteiro | (Japan) Honda | Vila Real | Report | |
| 2018 | Race 1 | (France) Yvan Muller | (South Korea) Hyundai | Vila Real | Report | |
| 2018 | Race 2 | (Slovakia) Mat'o Homola | (France) Peugeot | Vila Real | Report | |
| 2018 | Race 3 | (Sweden) Thed Björk | (South Korea) Hyundai | Vila Real | Report | |

=== World Touring Car Championship (2007–2017) ===
| Year | Race | Driver | Manufacturer | Circuit | Report | Ref. |
|---|---|---|---|---|---|---|
| 2017 | Opening Race | (Morocco) Mehdi Bennani | (France) Citroën | Vila Real | Report | |
| 2017 | Main Race | (Hungary) Norbert Michelisz | (Japan) Honda | Vila Real | Report | |
| 2016 | Opening Race | (Netherlands) Tom Coronel | (United States) Chevrolet | Vila Real | Report | |
| 2016 | Main Race | (Portugal) Tiago Monteiro | (Japan) Honda | Vila Real | Report | |
| 2015 | Race 1 | (Argentina) José María López | (France) Citroën | Vila Real | Report | |
| 2015 | Race 2 | (China) Ma Qing Hua | (France) Citroën | Vila Real | Report | |
| 2014 | Not held | | | | | |
| 2013 | Race 1 | (France) Yvan Muller | (United States) Chevrolet | Boavista | Report | |
| 2013 | Race 2 | (United Kingdom) James Nash | (United States) Chevrolet | Boavista | Report | |
| 2012 | Race 1 | (France) Yvan Muller | (United States) Chevrolet | Portimão | Report | |
| 2012 | Race 2 | (Switzerland) Alain Menu | (United States) Chevrolet | Portimão | Report | |
| 2011 | Race 1 | (Switzerland) Alain Menu | (United States) Chevrolet | Boavista | Report | |
| 2011 | Race 2 | (United Kingdom) Robert Huff | (United States) Chevrolet | Boavista | Report | |
| 2010 | Race 1 | (Portugal) Tiago Monteiro | (Spain) SEAT | Portimão | Report | |
| 2010 | Race 2 | (Italy) Gabriele Tarquini | (Spain) SEAT | Portimão | Report | |
| 2009 | Race 1 | (Italy) Gabriele Tarquini | (Spain) SEAT | Boavista | Report | |
| 2009 | Race 2 | (Brazil) Augusto Farfus | (Germany) BMW | Boavista | Report | |
| 2008 | Race 1 | (Sweden) Rickard Rydell | (Spain) SEAT | Estoril | Report | |
| 2008 | Race 2 | (Portugal) Tiago Monteiro | (Spain) SEAT | Estoril | Report | |
| 2007 | Race 1 | (Switzerland) Alain Menu | (United States) Chevrolet | Boavista | Report | |
| 2007 | Race 2 | (United Kingdom) Andy Priaulx | (Germany) BMW | Boavista | Report | |

== See also ==
- Portuguese Grand Prix – event held as part of the Formula One World Championship
- Portuguese motorcycle Grand Prix – event held as part of the MotoGP Grand Prix motorcycling series
- Rally de Portugal – event held as part of the World Rally Championship
