= FIA WTCR Race of Russia =

- Sochi Autodrom (2021)

Race information
- Number of times held: 5
- First held: 2013
- Last held: 2021
- Most wins (drivers): (France) Yvan Muller (2)
- Most wins (constructors): (France) Citroën (3)

Last race (2021)
- Race 1 Winner: (Spain) Mikel Azcona; (Zengő Motorsport Services KFT)
- Race 2 Winner: (United Kingdom) Robert Huff; (Zengő Motorsport Services KFT)

The FIA WTCR Race of Russia is a round of the World Touring Car Championship, which was held for the first time in 2013 at the Moscow Raceway until 2016 in Volokolamsk, 70 kilometres (43 mi) from the capital, Moscow.

The event returned in 2021, but the venue was relocated to the Sochi Autodrom. The event was also included in the 2022 calendar, but it was deferred to 2023 due to the ongoing Russian invasion of Ukraine.

== Winners ==
Moscow Raceway, which held races in 2013–2016

Year	Race	Driver	Manufacturer	Location	Report
2021	Race 1	(Spain) Mikel Azcona	(Spain) Cupra	Sochi Autodrom	Report
2021	Race 2	(United Kingdom) Robert Huff	(Spain) Cupra	Sochi Autodrom	Report
2016	Opening Race	(Italy) Gabriele Tarquini	(Russia) Lada	Moscow Raceway	Report
2016	Main Race	(Netherlands) Nick Catsburg	(Russia) Lada	Moscow Raceway	Report
2015	Race 1	(France) Yvan Muller	(France) Citroën	Moscow Raceway	Report
2015	Race 2	(Portugal) Tiago Monteiro	(Japan) Honda	Moscow Raceway	Report
2014	Race 1	(Argentina) José María López	(France) Citroën	Moscow Raceway	Report
2014	Race 2	(China) Ma Qing Hua	(France) Citroën	Moscow Raceway	Report
2013	Race 1	(France) Yvan Muller	(United States) Chevrolet	Moscow Raceway	Report
2013	Race 2	(Denmark) Michel Nykjær	(United States) Chevrolet	Moscow Raceway	Report
