= 2015 European Touring Car Cup =

Motorsport contest

Seasons
- ← 2014 2016 →

The 2015 FIA European Touring Car Cup is the eleventh running of the FIA European Touring Car Cup. It will consist of six events in Hungary, Slovakia, France, Czech Republic, Belgium and Italy. The championship will be split into three categories: Super 2000 for TC2 Turbo and TC2 machinery, Super 1600, and the Single-Make Trophy for cars such as the SEAT León Supercopa.

Nikolay Karamyshev, Petr Fulín, Gilles Bruckner and Dmitry Bragin will be the defending champions in TC2 Turbo, TC2, Super 1600 and Single-makes Trophy respectively. From these four only Bruckner will be able to defend his title as Fulín moved to the Single-makes Trophy, while Karamyshev and Bragin left the series.

== Teams and drivers ==
TC2 Turbo
Team	Car	No.	Drivers	Rounds
(Turkey) Ülkü Motorsport	BMW 320 TC	2	(Turkey) Ümit Ülkü	All
(Turkey) Ülkü Motorsport	BMW 320 TC	3	(Turkey) Galip Atar	All
(Turkey) Borusan Otomotiv Motorsport	BMW 320 TC	4	(Turkey) Aytaç Biter	All
(Germany) Liqui Moly Team Engstler	BMW 320 TC	5	(Georgia (country)) Davit Kajaia	All
(Germany) Liqui Moly Team Engstler	BMW 320 TC	6	(Germany) Franz Engstler	6
TC2
Team	Car	No.	Drivers	Rounds
(Switzerland) Rikli Motorsport	Honda Civic FD	12	(Switzerland) Peter Rikli	All
(Switzerland) Rikli Motorsport	Honda Civic FD	24	(Switzerland) Daniel Conrad	All
(Turkey) Borusan Otomotiv Motorsport	BMW 320si	13	(Turkey) Ibrahim Okyay	All
(Czech Republic) Krenek Motorsport	BMW 320si	20	(Czech Republic) Michal Matějovský	All
Super 1600
Team	Car	No.	Drivers	Rounds
(Luxembourg) Gilles Bruckner	Ford Fiesta 1.6 16V	31	(Luxembourg) Gilles Bruckner	All
(Luxembourg) Ben Lintgen	Ford Fiesta ST	32	(Luxembourg) Ben Lintgen	5
(Germany) Ravenol Team	Ford Fiesta 1.6 16V	33	(Germany) Ulrike Krafft	All
(Germany) Ravenol Team	Ford Fiesta 1.6 16V	34	(Germany) Erwin Lukas	3–6
(Germany) Ravenol Team	Ford Fiesta 1.6 16V	35	(Germany) Christian Kranenberg	1
(Germany) Niklas Mackschin	Ford Fiesta 1.6 16V	36	(Germany) Niklas Mackschin	All
(Germany) Florian Hildner	Ford Fiesta 1.6 16V	38	(Germany) Florian Hildner	All
Single-Make Trophy
Team	Car	No.	Drivers	Rounds
(Germany) ADAC Team Hessen-Thüringen e.V	SEAT León Cup Racer	55	(Germany) Andreas Pfister	All
(Serbia) LEIN Racing	SEAT León Cup Racer	62	(Montenegro) Dejan Bulatovič	2–4
(Serbia) LEIN Racing	SEAT León Cup Racer	77	(Serbia) Mladen Lalušić	2–4
(Switzerland) Topcar Sport	SEAT León Cup Racer	66	(Switzerland) Ronny Jost	All
(Slovakia) Homola Motorsport	SEAT León Cup Racer	70	(Slovakia) Maťo Homola	All
(Czech Republic) Krenek Motorsport	SEAT León Cup Racer	72	(Czech Republic) Petr Fulín	All
(Spain) Baporo Motorsport	SEAT León Cup Racer	73	(Kazakhstan) Alexandr Artemyev	1
(Hungary) Zengő Motorsport	SEAT León Cup Racer	96	(Hungary) Ferenc Ficza	1–2
(Hungary) Zengő Motorsport	SEAT León Cup Racer	99	(Hungary) Norbert Tóth	2
(Hungary) NIS Petrol B3 Racing Team	SEAT León Cup Racer	98	(Serbia) Dušan Borković	All

== Race calendar and results ==
Round		Circuit	Date	Pole position	Fastest lap	Overall winner	Winning SMT	Winning TC2T	Winning TC2	Winning S1600
1	R1	(Hungary) Hungaroring	3 May	(Serbia) Dušan Borković	(Hungary) Ferenc Ficza	(Hungary) Ferenc Ficza	(Hungary) Ferenc Ficza	(Georgia (country)) Davit Kajaia	(Czech Republic) Michal Matějovský	(Germany) Niklas Mackschin
1	R2	(Hungary) Hungaroring	3 May		(Serbia) Dušan Borković	(Serbia) Dušan Borković	(Serbia) Dušan Borković	(Georgia (country)) Davit Kajaia	(Switzerland) Peter Rikli	(Germany) Niklas Mackschin
2	R1	Automotodróm Slovakia Ring	21 June	(Czech Republic) Petr Fulín	(Czech Republic) Petr Fulín	(Czech Republic) Petr Fulín	(Czech Republic) Petr Fulín	(Georgia (country)) Davit Kajaia	(Czech Republic) Michal Matějovský	(Germany) Ulrike Krafft
2	R2	Automotodróm Slovakia Ring	21 June		(Georgia (country)) Davit Kajaia	(Serbia) Dušan Borković	(Serbia) Dušan Borković	(Georgia (country)) Davit Kajaia	(Czech Republic) Michal Matějovský	(Germany) Niklas Mackschin
3	R1	(France) Circuit Paul Ricard	28 June	(Serbia) Dušan Borković	(Serbia) Dušan Borković	(Serbia) Dušan Borković	(Serbia) Dušan Borković	(Georgia (country)) Davit Kajaia	(Switzerland) Peter Rikli	(Germany) Niklas Mackschin
3	R2	(France) Circuit Paul Ricard	28 June		(Serbia) Dušan Borković	(Germany) Andreas Pfister	(Germany) Andreas Pfister	(Georgia (country)) Davit Kajaia	(Czech Republic) Michal Matějovský	(Germany) Niklas Mackschin
4	R1	(Czech Republic) Masaryk Circuit	6 September	(Slovakia) Maťo Homola	(Slovakia) Maťo Homola	(Slovakia) Maťo Homola	(Slovakia) Maťo Homola	(Georgia (country)) Davit Kajaia	(Czech Republic) Michal Matějovský	(Germany) Niklas Mackschin
4	R2	(Czech Republic) Masaryk Circuit	6 September		(Montenegro) Dejan Bulatovič	(Serbia) Dušan Borković	(Serbia) Dušan Borković	(Georgia (country)) Davit Kajaia	(Czech Republic) Michal Matějovský	(Germany) Niklas Mackschin
5	R1	(Belgium) Circuit Zolder	20 September	(Georgia (country)) Davit Kajaia	(Georgia (country)) Davit Kajaia	(Slovakia) Maťo Homola	(Slovakia) Maťo Homola	(Turkey) Aytaç Biter	(Czech Republic) Michal Matějovský	(Germany) Niklas Mackschin
5	R2	(Belgium) Circuit Zolder	20 September		(Slovakia) Maťo Homola	(Serbia) Dušan Borković	(Serbia) Dušan Borković	(Turkey) Ümit Ülkü	(Czech Republic) Michal Matějovský	(Germany) Niklas Mackschin
6	R1	(Italy) Autodromo di Pergusa	11 October	(Serbia) Dušan Borković	(Czech Republic) Petr Fulín	(Czech Republic) Petr Fulín	(Czech Republic) Petr Fulín	(Georgia (country)) Davit Kajaia	(Switzerland) Peter Rikli	(Luxembourg) Gilles Bruckner
6	R2	(Italy) Autodromo di Pergusa	11 October		(Georgia (country)) Davit Kajaia	(Germany) Franz Engstler	(Czech Republic) Petr Fulín	(Germany) Franz Engstler	(Switzerland) Peter Rikli	(Germany) Niklas Mackschin

== Championship standings ==
Pos	Driver	HUN (Hungary)		SVK (Slovakia)		LEC (France)		BRN (Czech Republic)		ZOL (Belgium)		PER (Italy)		Pts
TC2 Turbo
1	(Georgia (country)) Davit Kajaia	**2**^{1}	**4**	**5**^{1}	**2**	**3**^{1}	**6**	**3**^{1}	**3**	**10**^{1}	9	2^{2}	2	149
2	(Turkey) Aytaç Biter	9^{3}	6	16^{2}	Ret	9^{2}	10	10^{2}	11	5^{2}	**10**	8	**8**	100
3	(Turkey) Ümit Ülkü	13^{2}	10	13	12	12^{3}	9	12^{3}	15	DSQ^{3}	7	9^{3}	9	90
4	(Turkey) Galip Atar	12	14	15^{3}	14	14	14	15	17	9	12	11	12	73
5	(Germany) Franz Engstler											**3**^{1}	1	42
TC2
1	(Czech Republic) Michal Matějovský	**8**^{1}	**9**	**8**^{1}	**6**	**11**^{1}	8	**8**^{1}	**5**	**4**^{1}	6	6^{2}	**7**	147
2	(Switzerland) Peter Rikli	10^{2}	8	9	7	10^{3}	**11**	11^{3}	10	7	**8**	**5**^{1}	6	130
3	(Turkey) Ibrahim Okyay	14^{3}	NC	11^{2}	8	13^{2}	13	13^{2}	9	6^{2}	Ret	7^{3}	10	86
4	(Switzerland) Daniel Conrad	11	13	14	13	17†	Ret	14	12	Ret^{3}	11	10	11	64
Super 1600
1	(Germany) Niklas Machschin	**15**^{1}	**15**	18^{2}	15	**15**^{1}	**15**	**16**^{1}	**13**	**11**^{1}	**13**	14^{3}	14	150
2	(Luxembourg) Gilles Bruckner	17^{3}	17	19^{3}	16	20^{2}	19†	17^{3}	14	12^{2}	Ret	13^{2}	**15**	105
3	(Germany) Ulrike Krafft	16^{2}	16	**17**^{1}	**17**	16^{3}	16	18^{2}	Ret	14^{3}	14	**Ret**^{1}	16	94
4	(Germany) Florian Hildner	18	19	Ret	DNS	19	17	19	16	15	16	15	17	62
5	(Germany) Erwin Lukas					18	18	DNS	DNS	13	15	16	18	41
6	(Germany) Christian Kranenberg	Ret	18											5
7	(Luxembourg) Ben Lintgen									Ret	DNS			0
Single-Make Trophy
1	(Serbia) Dušan Borković	**5**^{1}	1	3^{3}	1	**1**^{1}	2	2^{2}	1	3^{2}	1	**Ret**^{1}	13	110
2	(Czech Republic) Petr Fulín	3^{2}	3	**1**^{1}	4	2	12	4	DNS	2^{3}	4	1^{3}	3	107
3	(Germany) Andreas Pfister	4^{3}	12	6	5	4^{2}	1	5	6	Ret	5	12	4	78
4	(Slovakia) Maťo Homola	Ret	5	2^{2}	3	7^{3}	3	**1**^{1}	2	**1**^{1}	3	Ret^{2}	DNS	77
5	(Switzerland) Ronny Jost	6	7	7	**9**	5	4	7	**4**	8	2	4	**5**	75
6	(Montenegro) Dejan Bulatovič			10	11	6	5	6^{3}	8					20
7	(Hungary) Ferenc Ficza	1	2	20†	Ret									18
8	(Serbia) Mladen Lalušić			12	10	8	**7**	9	7					15
9	(Kazakhstan) Alexandr Artemyev	7	**11**											6
10	(Hungary) Norbert Tóth			4	Ret									5
Pos	Driver	HUN (Hungary)		SVK (Slovakia)		LEC (France)		BRN (Czech Republic)		ZOL (Belgium)		PER (Italy)		Pts

Colour	Result
Gold	Winner
Silver	Second place
Bronze	Third place
Green	Points classification
Blue	Non-points classification
Blue	Non-classified finish (NC)
Purple	Retired, not classified (Ret)
Red	Did not qualify (DNQ)
Red	Did not pre-qualify (DNPQ)
Black	Disqualified (DSQ)
White	Did not start (DNS)
White	Withdrew (WD)
White	Race cancelled (C)
Blank	Did not practice (DNP)
Blank	Did not arrive (DNA)
Blank	Excluded (EX)

**Bold** – Pole
Italics – Fastest Lap

† — Drivers did not finish the race, but were classified as they completed over 75% of the race distance.
