= 2012 European Touring Car Cup =

Motorsport contest

Seasons
- ← 2011 2013 →

The 2012 FIA European Touring Car Cup is the eighth running of the FIA European Touring Car Cup. It will consist of four events in Italy, Slovakia and Austria. The events will consist of two races run over a distance of approximately 50 kilometres (31 mi) each. For the first time, five FIA categories will be eligible to enter: Super 2000, Super 1600, Super Production, SEAT León Supercopa and Renault Clio Cup.

== Teams and drivers ==
Super 2000 class
Team	Car	No.	Drivers	Rounds
(Czech Republic) Krenek Motorsport	BMW 320si	2	(Czech Republic) Petr Fulín	All
(Turkey) Borusan Otomotiv Motorsport	BMW 320si	3	(Turkey) Aytaç Biter	All
(Germany) Liqui Moly Team Engstler	BMW 320si	4	(Ukraine) Igor Skuz	1
(Spain) SUNRED Engineering	SEAT León 2.0 TDI	4	(Ukraine) Igor Skuz	3–4
(Spain) SUNRED Engineering	SEAT León 2.0 TDI	8	(Spain) Fernando Monje	All
(Hungary) Rado Central KFT–RCM Motorsport	Peugeot 407	5	(Hungary) Gábor Tim	1–2
(Switzerland) Rikli Motorsport	Honda Civic FD	6	(Switzerland) Peter Rikli	All
(Switzerland) Rikli Motorsport	Honda Accord Euro R	9	(Switzerland) Christian Fischer	All
(Hungary) XFX Unicorse	Alfa Romeo 156	7	(Hungary) Ferenc Ficza	1–2
(Hungary) XFX Unicorse	Alfa Romeo 156	10	(Hungary) Csaba Gáspár	3
(Slovakia) Homola Motorsport	BMW 320si	11	(Slovakia) Maťo Homola	2–3
SEAT Sport Slovakia	SEAT León 2.0 TDI	20	(Czech Republic) Michal Matějovský	2
Single-makes Trophy
(Germany) Pfister Racing	SEAT León Supercopa	22	(Germany) Andreas Pfister	All
(Norway) Stian Paulsen Racing	SEAT León Supercopa	23	(Norway) Stian Paulsen	All
(Spain) PCR Sport	SEAT León Supercopa	24	(Switzerland) Urs Sonderegger	All
(Slovakia) SBM Motorsport	SEAT León Supercopa	25	(Slovakia) Patrick Nemec	2
(Czech Republic) Krenek Motorsport	SEAT León Supercopa	26	(Czech Republic) Jaromir Štádler	3–4
Super Production class
(Serbia) ASK Vitro Racing	Honda Civic Type R	31	(Serbia) Aleksandar Tošić	1–3
(Italy) F Motorsport	BMW 320i E46	32	(Italy) Fabio Fabiani	1, 4
(Russia) Nikolay Karamyshev	Honda Civic Type R	33	(Russia) Nikolay Karamyshev	All
Super 1600 class
(Germany) Ravenol Team	Ford Fiesta 1.6 16V	42	(Germany) Ulrike Krafft	All
(Germany) Ravenol Team	Ford Fiesta 1.6 16V	43	(Germany) Kevin Krammes	All
(Germany) Ravenol Team	Ford Fiesta 1.6 16V	44	(Italy) Paolo Necchi	All
(Germany) Ravenol Team	Ford Fiesta 1.6 16V	53	(Germany) Erwin Lukas	2–4
(Germany) ATM Racing	Ford Fiesta 1.6 16V	45	(Germany) Klaus Bingler	All
(Switzerland) Maurer Motorsport	Chevrolet Aveo	46	(Russia) Alexander Frolov	2
(Switzerland) Maurer Motorsport	Chevrolet Aveo	47	(Russia) Vadim Meshcheryakov	2–3
(Switzerland) Maurer Motorsport	Chevrolet Aveo	48	(Argentina) Wilson Borgnino	2–4
(Switzerland) Maurer Motorsport	Chevrolet Aveo	55	(Italy) Diego Romanini	4
(Germany) Rennsportteam Grossmann	Ford Fiesta ST	49	(Germany) Steffen Grossmann	All
(Germany) NK Racing Team	Ford Fiesta ST	50	(Germany) Ronny Reinsberger	All
(Germany) Michael Golz	Ford Fiesta ST	51	(Germany) Michael Golz	1
(Luxembourg) Team LuxMotor	Ford Fiesta ST	52	(Luxembourg) Gilles Bruckner	All

== Race calendar and results ==
Round		Country	Circuit	Date	Pole position	Fastest lap	Winning driver	Winning team
1	R1	Italy	Autodromo Nazionale Monza	11 March	(Spain) Fernando Monje	(Spain) Fernando Monje	(Spain) Fernando Monje	(Spain) SUNRED Engineering
1	R2	Italy	Autodromo Nazionale Monza	11 March	(Switzerland) Christian Fischer	(Spain) Fernando Monje	(Spain) Fernando Monje	(Spain) SUNRED Engineering
2	R1	Slovakia	Automotodróm Slovakia Ring	29 April	(Spain) Fernando Monje	(Spain) Fernando Monje	(Czech Republic) Michal Matějovský	SEAT Sport Slovakia
2	R2	Slovakia	Automotodróm Slovakia Ring	29 April	(Switzerland) Christian Fischer	(Czech Republic) Michal Matějovský	(Czech Republic) Petr Fulín	(Czech Republic) Krenek Motorsport
3	R1	Austria	Salzburgring	20 May	(Ukraine) Igor Skuz^{1}	(Spain) Fernando Monje	(Spain) Fernando Monje	(Spain) SUNRED Engineering
3	R2	Austria	Salzburgring	20 May	(Turkey) Aytaç Biter	(Spain) Fernando Monje	(Spain) Fernando Monje	(Spain) SUNRED Engineering
4	R1	Italy	Autodromo Enzo e Dino Ferrari	24 June	(Spain) Fernando Monje	(Spain) Fernando Monje	(Spain) Fernando Monje	(Spain) SUNRED Engineering
4	R2	Italy	Autodromo Enzo e Dino Ferrari	24 June	(Turkey) Aytaç Biter	(Spain) Fernando Monje	(Spain) Fernando Monje	(Spain) SUNRED Engineering

Notes
^1 — Fernando Monje originally qualified on pole position, but he received a 10-place grid penalty for a collision with Urs Sonderegger in Slovakia.

== Championship standings ==
=== Super 2000/1600 ===
Pos	Driver	MNZ (Italy)		SVK (Slovakia)		SAL (Austria)		IMO (Italy)		Pts
Super 2000
1	(Spain) Fernando Monje	**1**^{1}	1	**12**^{1}	Ret	1^{1}	1	**1**^{1}	1	73
2	(Switzerland) Peter Rikli	4^{3}	4	7	6	5	5	6^{3}	Ret	44
3	(Czech Republic) Petr Fulín	DSQ^{2}	EX	3	1	4^{3}	3	5	Ret	43
4	(Ukraine) Igor Skuz	16	7			**9**^{2}	8	2^{2}	2	35
5	(Turkey) Aytaç Biter	7	Ret	11	10	8	**7**	8	**6**	25
6	(Switzerland) Christian Fischer	8	**Ret**	8	**9**	21	DNS	7	4	23
7	(Czech Republic) Michal Matějovský			1^{2}	3					20
8	(Hungary) Ferenc Ficza	5	12	9^{3}	7					19
9	(Slovakia) Maťo Homola			5	5	DNS	DNS			12
10	(Hungary) Csaba Gáspár					7	4			11
	(Hungary) Gábor Tim	DNS	DNS	21	DNS					0
Super 1600
1	(Germany) Kevin Krammes	**11**^{1}	**8**	15	**13**	**12**^{1}	**12**	15^{2}	11	77
2	(Italy) Paolo Necchi	14	10	**16**^{1}	14	15^{2}	11	**12**^{1}	**9**	70
3	(Germany) Ulrike Krafft	12^{3}	DNS	Ret^{2}	16	16^{3}	13	14	13	37
4	(Argentina) Wilson Borgnino			DNS	DNS	13	14	13	10	29
5	(Luxembourg) Gilles Bruckner	13^{2}	9	Ret^{3}	DNS	17	15	Ret	12	29
6	(Germany) Klaus Bingler	15	11	17	17	20	18	17	14	26
7	(Germany) Ronny Reinsberger	DNS	DNS	22	15	18	16	Ret^{3}	DNS	14
8	(Germany) Erwin Lukas			20	19	19	17	16	16	13
9	(Germany) Steffen Grossmann	Ret	DNS	19	18	Ret	DNS	18	15	11
10	(Russia) Vadim Meshecheriakov			NC	Ret	14	19			6
11	(Russia) Alexander Frolov			18	DNS					5
12	(Italy) Diego Romanini							19	DNS	1
	(Germany) Michael Golz	DNQ	DNQ							0
Pos	Driver	MNZ (Italy)		SVK (Slovakia)		SAL (Austria)		IMO (Italy)		Pts

Colour	Result
Gold	Winner
Silver	Second place
Bronze	Third place
Green	Points classification
Blue	Non-points classification
Blue	Non-classified finish (NC)
Purple	Retired, not classified (Ret)
Red	Did not qualify (DNQ)
Red	Did not pre-qualify (DNPQ)
Black	Disqualified (DSQ)
White	Did not start (DNS)
White	Withdrew (WD)
White	Race cancelled (C)
Blank	Did not practice (DNP)
Blank	Did not arrive (DNA)
Blank	Excluded (EX)

**Bold** – Pole
Italics – Fastest Lap

=== Super Production/Single-makes Trophy ===
Pos	Driver	MNZ (Italy)		SVK (Slovakia)		SAL (Austria)		IMO (Italy)		Pts
Super Production
1	(Russia) Nikolay Karamyshev	10^{2}	6	**14**^{1}	11	10^{2}	**9**	10	**8**	83
2	(Serbia) Aleksandar Tošić	**9**^{1}	**Ret**	13^{2}	**12**	**11**^{1}	10			52
3	(Italy) Fabio Fabiani	EX	EX					**11**^{1}	17	19
Single-Makes Trophy
1	(Norway) Stian Paulsen	**2**^{1}	2	**4**^{1}	4	3^{2}	2	**3**^{1}	3	85
2	(Germany) Andreas Pfister	3^{2}	3	2^{2}	2	**2**^{1}	6	4^{2}	**5**	79
3	(Switzerland) Urs Sonderegger	6^{3}	**5**	10	Ret	6^{3}	**Ret**	DNS^{3}	DNS	26
4	(Slovakia) Patrick Nemec			6^{3}	**8**					13
5	(Czech Republic) Jaromir Štádler					Ret	DNS	9	7	12
Pos	Driver	MNZ (Italy)		SVK (Slovakia)		SAL (Austria)		IMO (Italy)		Pts

Colour	Result
Gold	Winner
Silver	Second place
Bronze	Third place
Green	Points classification
Blue	Non-points classification
Blue	Non-classified finish (NC)
Purple	Retired, not classified (Ret)
Red	Did not qualify (DNQ)
Red	Did not pre-qualify (DNPQ)
Black	Disqualified (DSQ)
White	Did not start (DNS)
White	Withdrew (WD)
White	Race cancelled (C)
Blank	Did not practice (DNP)
Blank	Did not arrive (DNA)
Blank	Excluded (EX)

**Bold** – Pole
Italics – Fastest Lap
