= 2013 European Touring Car Cup =

Motorsport contest

Seasons
- ← 2012 2014 →

The 2013 FIA European Touring Car Cup was the ninth running of the FIA European Touring Car Cup. It consisted of five events in Italy, Slovakia, Austria and the Czech Republic. The championship was split into three categories: Super 2000, Super 1600, and the Single-Make Trophy for cars such as the SEAT León Supercopa. The Super Production category was abolished for this season. The 2013 season saw the introduction of the Lady Trophy Cup, with the best-placed female driver in either of the categories at each event receiving €10,000 in prize money. Diesel engines were banned from the championship.

== Teams and drivers ==
Super 2000 class
| Team | Car | No. | Drivers | Rounds |
|---|---|---|---|---|
| (Switzerland) Rikli Motorsport | Honda Civic FD | 2 | (Switzerland) Peter Rikli | All |
| (Switzerland) Rikli Motorsport | Honda Civic FD | 10 | (Switzerland) Andrina Gugger | All |
| (Spain) Campos Racing | SEAT León | 3 | (Ukraine) Igor Skuz | All |
| (Spain) Campos Racing | SEAT León | 19 | (Austria) Wolfgang Treml | 3 |
| (Germany) Liqui Moly Team Engstler | BMW 320si | 5 | (Germany) Roland Hertner | 1–3, 5 |
| (Germany) Liqui Moly Team Engstler | BMW 320si | 6 | (Switzerland) Christian Fischer | 1, 3–5 |
| (Slovakia) Homola Motorsport | BMW 320si | 9 | (Slovakia) Maťo Homola | All |
| (Serbia) NIS Petrol Racing Team | SEAT León | 12 | (Serbia) Dušan Borković | 1–3 |
| (Serbia) NIS Petrol Racing Team | Chevrolet Cruze LT | 12 | (Serbia) Dušan Borković | 4–5 |
| (Turkey) Borusan Otomotiv Motorsport | BMW 320si | 13 | (Turkey) Ibrahim Okyay | 1 |
| (Turkey) Borusan Otomotiv Motorsport | BMW 320si | 23 | (Turkey) Aytaç Biter | 2–3 |
| (Slovakia) Incar Revco Team | Alfa Romeo 156 | 14 | (Slovakia) Filip Sládecka | 2–3 |
| (Russia) AMG Motorsport | BMW 320si | 15 | (Russia) Roman Golikov | 1 |
| (Russia) AMG Motorsport | BMW 320si | 16 | (Russia) Oleg Chebotarev | 1 |
| (Russia) AMG Motorsport | BMW 320si | 17 | (Russia) Mikhail Grachev | 1 |
| (Russia) AMG Motorsport | BMW 320si | 18 | (Russia) Oleg Petrikov | 1 |
| (Italy) Proteam Racing | BMW 320si | 17 | (Russia) Mikhail Grachev | 5 |
| (Italy) Proteam Racing | BMW 320si | 24 | (Italy) Diego Romanini | 2 |
| (Czech Republic) Krenek Motorsport | BMW 320si | 20 | (Czech Republic) Michal Matějovský | All |
| (Czech Republic) Krenek Motorsport | BMW 320si | 22 | (Czech Republic) Petr Fulín | All |
Super 1600 class
| (Germany) Ravenol Team | Ford Fiesta 1.6 16V | 31 | (Germany) Kevin Krammes | All |
| (Germany) Ravenol Team | Ford Fiesta 1.6 16V | 33 | (Germany) Ulrike Krafft | All |
| (Germany) Ravenol Team | Ford Fiesta 1.6 16V | 38 | (Germany) Erwin Lukas | 1–2 |
| (Germany) Ravenol Team | Citroën C2 VTS | 38 | (Germany) Erwin Lukas | 3–5 |
| (Germany) Ravenol Team | Ford Fiesta 1.6 16V | 41 | (Italy) Romeo Luciano | All |
| (Luxembourg) Team LuxMotor | Ford Fiesta ST | 35 | (Luxembourg) Gilles Bruckner | 1, 3–5 |
| (Germany) AK.21 Motorsport | Ford Fiesta 1.6 16V | 36 | (Germany) Klaus Bingler | All |
| (Ukraine) M-Sport | Ford Fiesta ST | 37 | (Ukraine) Ksenya Niks | 1–2 |
| (Ukraine) M-Sport | Ford Fiesta 1.6 16V | 37 | (Ukraine) Ksenya Niks | 3–5 |
| (Ukraine) Master KR Racing | Ford Fiesta 1.6 16V | 39 | (Ukraine) Oleksander Ivanchenko | 1 |
| (Ukraine) Master KR Racing | Ford Fiesta 1.6 16V | 40 | (Ukraine) Anton Zaitsev | 1–3, 5 |
Single-makes Trophy
| (Germany) Pfister Racing | SEAT León Supercopa | 52 | (Germany) Andreas Pfister | 1–2 |
| (Germany) ADAC Team Nordbayern | SEAT León Supercopa | 52 | (Germany) Andreas Pfister | 3–5 |
| (Latvia) Papa's Racing Team | SEAT León Supercopa | 54 | (Russia) Nikolay Karamyshev | 1 |
| (Latvia) Black and White Racing Team | SEAT León Supercopa | 54 | (Russia) Nikolay Karamyshev | 2–5 |
| (Hungary) Zengő Junior Team | SEAT León Supercopa | 55 | (Hungary) Ferenc Ficza | All |
| (Hungary) Zengő Junior Team | SEAT León Supercopa | 56 | (Hungary) Norbert Nagy | All |
| (Spain) Tuenti Racing Team | SEAT León Supercopa | 57 | (Spain) Jordi Oriola | All |
| (Russia) SMP Racing Russian Bears | SEAT León Supercopa | 58 | (Russia) Anton Ladygin | All |
| (Russia) SMP Racing Russian Bears | SEAT León Supercopa | 59 | (Russia) Mikhail Maleev | All |
| (Spain) Galaxi Racing | SEAT León Supercopa | 60 | (France) Aurélien Comte | All |
| (Germany) Target Competition | SEAT León Supercopa | 61 | (Austria) Mario Dablander | All |
| (Spain) Campos Racing | SEAT León Supercopa | 62 | (Italy) Gianni Giudici | 1 |
| (Spain) Baporo Motorsport | SEAT León Supercopa | 63 | (United Kingdom) Nicolas Hamilton | 1–3 |
| (Czech Republic) Krenek Motorsport | SEAT León Supercopa | 64 | (Czech Republic) Jaromir Štádler | 3, 5 |

== Race calendar and results ==
| Round | | Circuit | Date | Pole position | Fastest lap | Winning S2000 | Winning S1600 | Winning SMT |
|---|---|---|---|---|---|---|---|---|
| 1 | R1 | (Italy) Autodromo Nazionale Monza | 24 March | (Czech Republic) Petr Fulín | (France) Aurélien Comte | (Switzerland) Peter Rikli | (Germany) Kevin Krammes | (Spain) Jordi Oriola |
| 1 | R2 | (Italy) Autodromo Nazionale Monza | 24 March | (Russia) Anton Ladygin | (Austria) Mario Dablander | (Czech Republic) Petr Fulín | (Germany) Kevin Krammes | (Russia) Nikolay Karamyshev |
| 2 | R1 | Automotodróm Slovakia Ring | 28 April | (Czech Republic) Petr Fulín | (Czech Republic) Petr Fulín | (Czech Republic) Petr Fulín | (Germany) Kevin Krammes | (Germany) Andreas Pfister |
| 2 | R2 | Automotodróm Slovakia Ring | 28 April | (Switzerland) Andrina Gugger | (Czech Republic) Petr Fulín | (Slovakia) Maťo Homola | (Germany) Kevin Krammes | (Germany) Andreas Pfister |
| 3 | R1 | (Austria) Salzburgring | 19 May | (Czech Republic) Petr Fulín | (Russia) Mikhail Maleev | (Serbia) Dušan Borković | (Germany) Kevin Krammes | (France) Aurélien Comte |
| 3 | R2 | (Austria) Salzburgring | 19 May | (Hungary) Norbert Nagy | (France) Aurélien Comte | (Slovakia) Maťo Homola | (Germany) Kevin Krammes | (Austria) Mario Dablander |
| 4 | R1 | (Italy) Autodromo di Pergusa | 14 July | (Russia) Anton Ladygin | (Serbia) Dušan Borković | (Czech Republic) Petr Fulín | (Germany) Kevin Krammes | (Spain) Jordi Oriola |
| 4 | R2 | (Italy) Autodromo di Pergusa | 14 July | (Austria) Mario Dablander | (Czech Republic) Petr Fulín | (Slovakia) Maťo Homola | (Germany) Ulrike Krafft | (Austria) Mario Dablander |
| 5 | R1 | (Czech Republic) Masaryk Circuit | 6 October | (Czech Republic) Petr Fulín | (Czech Republic) Petr Fulín | (Czech Republic) Petr Fulín | (Luxembourg) Gilles Bruckner | (France) Aurélien Comte |
| 5 | R2 | (Czech Republic) Masaryk Circuit | 6 October | (Austria) Mario Dablander | (Czech Republic) Petr Fulín | (Czech Republic) Petr Fulín | (Luxembourg) Gilles Bruckner | (Austria) Mario Dablander |

== Championship standings ==
=== Super 2000/1600 ===
| Pos | Driver | MNZ (Italy) | | SVK (Slovakia) | | SAL (Austria) | | PER (Italy) | | BRN (Czech Republic) | | Pts |
Super 2000
| 1 | (Czech Republic) Petr Fulín | **5**^{1} | 5 | **1**^{1} | 2 | **Ret**^{1} | DNS | **1**^{1} | 2 | 1^{2} | 1 | 88 |
| 2 | (Slovakia) Maťo Homola | Ret^{2} | 17 | 2^{2} | 1 | 6^{3} | 6 | 3^{3} | 1 | 2 | 2 | 74 |
| 3 | (Serbia) Dušan Borković | 16 | 9 | Ret | DNS | 1 | 12 | 2 | 3 | 3^{2} | **3** | 48 |
| 4 | (Switzerland) Peter Rikli | 3 | Ret | Ret^{3} | 11 | 9 | 7 | 11 | Ret | 9 | 8 | 40 |
| 5 | (Czech Republic) Michal Matějovský | 15 | 14 | 4 | 4 | 7 | **Ret** | 16 | 8 | **Ret**^{1} | 9 | 35 |
| 6 | (Switzerland) Andrina Gugger | 10 | 13 | 8 | **9** | 15 | 16 | 10 | 10 | 11 | 22† | 32 |
| 7 | (Ukraine) Igor Skuz | 19 | Ret | 9 | Ret | 14^{2} | 14 | 6^{2} | **6** | 24 | 21† | 25 |
| 8 | (Switzerland) Christian Fischer | 7 | **8** | | | DNS | DNS | 14 | 13 | Ret | 27† | 18 |
| 9 | (Germany) Roland Hertner | 17 | 16 | 12 | 13 | 13 | 10 | | | 17 | 16 | 16 |
| 10 | (Russia) Mikhail Grachev | 12 | 12 | | | | | | | 15 | 12 | 14 |
| 11 | (Turkey) Aytaç Biter | | | Ret | 12 | 17 | 8 | | | | | 8 |
| 12 | (Russia) Oleg Petrikov | 9^{3} | 15 | | | | | | | | | 8 |
| 13 | (Italy) Diego Romanini | | | 11 | 10 | | | | | | | 7 |
| 14 | (Austria) Wolfgang Treml | | | | | 11 | Ret | | | | | 4 |
| | (Turkey) Ibrahim Okyay | 21 | Ret | | | | | | | | | 0 |
| | (Russia) Oleg Chebotarev | 20 | 18 | | | | | | | | | 0 |
| | (Russia) Roman Golikov | Ret | 23 | | | | | | | | | 0 |
| | (Slovakia) Filip Sládecka | | | DNS | DNS | 26† | DNS | | | | | 0 |
Super 1600
| 1 | (Germany) Kevin Krammes | 23^{2} | **19** | **13**^{1} | **14** | **18**^{1} | **11** | **17**^{1} | **Ret** | **19**^{1} | 19 | 100 |
| 2 | (Luxembourg) Gilles Bruckner | **24**^{1} | 20 | | | 19^{2} | 13 | 18^{2} | 18† | 18^{2} | **18** | 74 |
| 3 | (Germany) Ulrike Krafft | 25 | 22 | 15^{3} | 16 | 20 | Ret | 19 | 15 | 20 | 20 | 58 |
| 4 | (Italy) Romeo Luciano | 27^{3} | Ret | 14^{2} | 15 | 24†^{3} | 15 | 22†^{3} | DNS | 21^{3} | 23 | 47 |
| 5 | (Germany) Klaus Bingler | 28 | 24 | 16 | Ret | 21 | 17 | 21 | 16 | 26 | 26 | 37 |
| 6 | (Germany) Erwin Lukas | 29 | 25 | 18 | 18 | 22 | 18 | 20 | 17 | 22 | 28 | 36 |
| 7 | (Ukraine) Anton Zaitsev | 30 | Ret | 17 | 17 | 23 | 19 | | | 23 | 24 | 23 |
| 8 | (Ukraine) Oleksander Ivanchenko | 26 | 21 | | | | | | | | | 11 |
| 9 | (Ukraine) Ksenya Niks | 31 | 27 | DNS | DNS | 25 | 20 | Ret | DNS | 25 | 25 | 10 |
| Pos | Driver | MNZ (Italy) | | SVK (Slovakia) | | SAL (Austria) | | PER (Italy) | | BRN (Czech Republic) | | Pts |

| Colour | Result |
|---|---|
| Gold | Winner |
| Silver | Second place |
| Bronze | Third place |
| Green | Points classification |
| Blue | Non-points classification |
| Blue | Non-classified finish (NC) |
| Purple | Retired, not classified (Ret) |
| Red | Did not qualify (DNQ) |
| Red | Did not pre-qualify (DNPQ) |
| Black | Disqualified (DSQ) |
| White | Did not start (DNS) |
| White | Withdrew (WD) |
| White | Race cancelled (C) |
| Blank | Did not practice (DNP) |
| Blank | Did not arrive (DNA) |
| Blank | Excluded (EX) |

**Bold** – Pole
Italics – Fastest Lap

=== Single-makes Trophy ===
| Pos | Driver | MNZ (Italy) | | SVK (Slovakia) | | SAL (Austria) | | PER (Italy) | | BRN (Czech Republic) | | Pts |
|---|---|---|---|---|---|---|---|---|---|---|---|---|
| 1 | (Austria) Mario Dablander | 4 | 2 | 10 | 6 | 4 | 1 | 8 | **4** | 8 | **4** | 69 |
| 2 | (France) Aurélien Comte | 2^{3} | 4 | **Ret**^{1} | DNS | 2^{3} | 3 | 12^{2} | 9 | 4^{2} | 7 | 61 |
| 3 | (Spain) Jordi Oriola | 1^{2} | Ret | 5^{3} | 5 | **5**^{1} | Ret | 4^{3} | Ret | 7^{3} | 15 | 54 |
| 4 | (Russia) Nikolay Karamyshev | 6 | 1 | 6 | 8 | 16 | 5 | 5 | 5 | 14 | 10 | 50 |
| 5 | (Germany) Andreas Pfister | **22**†^{1} | 26† | 3^{2} | 3 | Ret^{2} | DNS | 23 | 7 | 6 | 6 | 45 |
| 6 | (Russia) Anton Ladygin | 8 | **3** | Ret | Ret | 3 | 2 | **15**^{1} | 11 | 10 | 14 | 38 |
| 7 | (Hungary) Norbert Nagy | 18 | 11 | 7 | **7** | 8 | **4** | 9 | 12 | 12 | 11 | 32 |
| 8 | (Hungary) Ferenc Ficza | 13 | 6 | Ret | DNS | NC | Ret | 13 | 14 | **5**^{1} | 5 | 29 |
| 9 | (Russia) Mikhail Maleev | 14 | 10 | Ret | DNS | 12 | Ret | 7 | Ret | 13 | 13 | 14 |
| 10 | (United Kingdom) Nicolas Hamilton | 11 | 7 | Ret | DNS | 10 | 9 | | | | | 12 |
| | (Czech Republic) Jaromir Štádler | | | | | 27† | DNS | | | 16 | 17 | 0 |
| | (Italy) Gianni Giudici | WD | WD | | | | | | | | | 0 |
| Pos | Driver | MNZ (Italy) | | SVK (Slovakia) | | SAL (Austria) | | PER (Italy) | | BRN (Czech Republic) | | Pts |

| Colour | Result |
|---|---|
| Gold | Winner |
| Silver | Second place |
| Bronze | Third place |
| Green | Points classification |
| Blue | Non-points classification |
| Blue | Non-classified finish (NC) |
| Purple | Retired, not classified (Ret) |
| Red | Did not qualify (DNQ) |
| Red | Did not pre-qualify (DNPQ) |
| Black | Disqualified (DSQ) |
| White | Did not start (DNS) |
| White | Withdrew (WD) |
| White | Race cancelled (C) |
| Blank | Did not practice (DNP) |
| Blank | Did not arrive (DNA) |
| Blank | Excluded (EX) |

**Bold** – Pole
Italics – Fastest Lap

† — Drivers did not finish the race, but were classified as they completed over 90% of the race distance.
