= 2014 European Touring Car Cup =

Motorsport contest

Seasons
- ← 2013 2015 →

The 2014 FIA European Touring Car Cup was the tenth running of the FIA European Touring Car Cup. It consisted of five events in France, Slovakia, Austria, Belgium and Italy. The championship was split into three categories: Super 2000 for TC2 Turbo and TC2 machinery, Super 1600, and the Single-Make Trophy for cars such as the SEAT León Supercopa.

In the Super 2000 class, TC2 Turbo honours were taken by Nikolay Karamyshev, who won six of the season's races. He won the championship by 10 points ahead of Maťo Homola, while Igor Skuz finished in 3rd position, taking 2 victories. Mikhail Grachev was the only other driver to take a class victory, at the Slovakia Ring. For normally-aspirated cars, the TC2 class saw Petr Fulín take the honours; he won seven races and finished the other three races on the podium. He finished 44 points ahead of his nearest challenger Michal Matějovský, who took a win at the Salzburgring. Third place in class was taken by Peter Rikli; other race victories were taken by Christian Fischer and Norbert Kiss, the latter taking an overall win at the Slovakia Ring.

In the Super 1600 class, six successive victories for Gilles Bruckner saw him overhaul Ulrike Krafft for class honours, despite missing the opening round of the season at Le Castellet. Krafft won the other four races during the season, before a scoreless round at Spa-Francorchamps stunted her progress for the title. With five second-place finishes, Christian Kranenberg finished in third place. Dmitry Bragin won the Single-Makes Trophy, after achieving two victories as well as two second-place finishes at the double-points finale at Enna. Second place went to Andreas Pfister, who also won two races, while four-time race winner Aku Pellinen finished in third place. The only other driver to take a class win was Norbert Nagy, who won both races at Enna in a one-off appearance; he had previously competed in the TC2 class at the first two meetings.

== Teams and drivers ==
Super 2000 class
Team	Car	No.	Drivers	Rounds
TC2 Turbo
(Slovakia) Homola Motorsport	BMW 320 TC	2	(Slovakia) Maťo Homola	All
(Spain) Campos Racing	Chevrolet Cruze 1.6T	3	(Ukraine) Igor Skuz	All
(Spain) Campos Racing	Chevrolet Cruze 1.6T	12	(Russia) Nikolay Karamyshev	All
(Turkey) Borusan Otomotiv Motorsport	BMW 320 TC	4	(Turkey) Aytaç Biter	All
(Germany) Liqui Moly Team Engstler	BMW 320 TC	6	(Germany) Franz Engstler	1
(Italy) Proteam Racing	BMW 320 TC	27	(Russia) Mikhail Grachev	1–2
TC2
(Switzerland) Rikli Motorsport	Honda Civic FD	7	(Switzerland) Peter Rikli	All
(Switzerland) Rikli Motorsport	Honda Civic FD	10	(Switzerland) Andrina Gugger	All
(Hungary) MGS Racing Team	Chevrolet Cruze LT	8	(Hungary) Norbert Nagy	1–2
(Germany) Liqui Moly Team Engstler	BMW 320si	9	(Switzerland) Christian Fischer	All
(Germany) Liqui Moly Team Engstler	BMW 320si	11	(Bulgaria) Plamen Kralev	1–4
(Serbia) ASK Sport Auto Vesnić	BMW 320si	14	(Serbia) Milovan Vesnić	1–3
(Hungary) Team Unicorse	Alfa Romeo 156	15	(Hungary) Norbert Kiss	1–2
(Hungary) Team Unicorse	Alfa Romeo 156	25	(Slovakia) Filip Sládecka	4
(Turkey) Borusan Otomotiv Motorsport	BMW 320si	16	(Turkey) Kaan Önder	All
(Turkey) Borusan Otomotiv Motorsport	BMW 320si	23	(Turkey) Selçuk Salargil	4
(Slovakia) Sládecka Motorsport	Alfa Romeo 156	18	(Slovakia) Samuel Sládecka	All
(Czech Republic) Krenek Motorsport	BMW 320si	20	(Czech Republic) Michal Matějovský	All
(Czech Republic) Krenek Motorsport	BMW 320si	22	(Czech Republic) Petr Fulín	All
(Italy) Pro Motorsport	BMW 320i	24	(Italy) Massimo Zanin	4
(Italy) Pro Motorsport	BMW 320i	26	(Italy) Filippo Maria Zanin	4
Super 1600 class
(Luxembourg) Team LuxMotor	Ford Fiesta 1.6 16V	32	(Luxembourg) Gilles Bruckner	1, 3–5
(Luxembourg) Team LuxMotor	Ford Fiesta ST	32	(Luxembourg) Gilles Bruckner	2
(Luxembourg) Team LuxMotor	Ford Fiesta ST	38	(Luxembourg) Ben Lintgen	4
(Germany) Ravenol Team	Ford Fiesta 1.6 16V	33	(Germany) Ulrike Krafft	All
(Germany) Ravenol Team	Ford Fiesta 1.6 16V	34	(Switzerland) Patrick Wolf	1–3
(Germany) Ravenol Team	Ford Fiesta 1.6 16V	35	(Germany) Christian Kranenberg	All
(Germany) Ravenol Team	Ford Fiesta 1.6 16V	36	(Germany) Erwin Lukas	1, 3–5
(Germany) Ravenol Team	Ford Fiesta 1.6 16V	39	(Ukraine) Kseniya Niks	All
Single-makes Trophy
(Hungary) MGS Racing Team	SEAT León Supercopa	8	(Hungary) Norbert Nagy	5
(Germany) ADAC Team Nordbayern EV	SEAT León Supercopa	55	(Germany) Andreas Pfister	All
(Finland) Aku Motorsport Team Niinivirta	SEAT León Supercopa	56	(Finland) Aku Pellinen	1–4
(Russia) SMP Racing Russian Bears	SEAT León Supercopa	57	(Russia) Mikhail Maleev	All
(Russia) SMP Racing Russian Bears	SEAT León Supercopa	58	(Russia) Sergey Ryabov	All
(Russia) SMP Racing Russian Bears	SEAT León Supercopa	59	(Russia) Dmitry Bragin	All
(Russia) SMP Racing Russian Bears	SEAT León Supercopa	60	(Russia) Vladimir Nikolaev	All
(Switzerland) Topcar Sport	SEAT León Supercopa	66	(Switzerland) Ronny Jost	All
(Spain) PCR Sport Club	SEAT León Supercopa	69	(Switzerland) Urs Sonderegger	1

== Race calendar and results ==
Round		Circuit	Date	Pole position	Fastest lap	Winning TC2T	Winning TC2	Winning S1600	Winning SMT
1	R1	(France) Circuit Paul Ricard	20 April	(Russia) Nikolay Karamyshev	(Russia) Nikolay Karamyshev	(Russia) Nikolay Karamyshev	(Czech Republic) Petr Fulín	(Germany) Ulrike Krafft	(Finland) Aku Pellinen
1	R2	(France) Circuit Paul Ricard	20 April		(Russia) Nikolay Karamyshev	(Ukraine) Igor Skuz	(Czech Republic) Petr Fulín	(Germany) Ulrike Krafft	(Finland) Aku Pellinen
2	R1	Automotodróm Slovakia Ring	11 May	(Slovakia) Maťo Homola	(Slovakia) Maťo Homola	(Russia) Mikhail Grachev	(Hungary) Norbert Kiss	(Germany) Ulrike Krafft	(Germany) Andreas Pfister
2	R2	Automotodróm Slovakia Ring	11 May		(Slovakia) Maťo Homola	(Slovakia) Maťo Homola	(Czech Republic) Petr Fulín	(Germany) Ulrike Krafft	(Germany) Andreas Pfister
3	R1	(Austria) Salzburgring	25 May	(Ukraine) Igor Skuz (Note: Nikolay Karamyshev had claimed the pole by setting the fastest time, ahead of team-mate Igor Skuz and Maťo Homola. Karamyshev eventually lost his pole position after his car was found to be underweight. Skuz was promoted to pole position.)	(Russia) Nikolay Karamyshev	(Russia) Nikolay Karamyshev	(Czech Republic) Michal Matějovský	(Luxembourg) Gilles Bruckner	(Finland) Aku Pellinen
3	R2	(Austria) Salzburgring	25 May		(Slovakia) Maťo Homola	(Russia) Nikolay Karamyshev	(Switzerland) Christian Fischer	(Luxembourg) Gilles Bruckner	(Finland) Aku Pellinen
4	R1	(Belgium) Spa-Francorchamps	22 June	(Russia) Nikolay Karamyshev	(Russia) Nikolay Karamyshev	(Russia) Nikolay Karamyshev	(Czech Republic) Petr Fulín	(Luxembourg) Gilles Bruckner	(Russia) Dmitry Bragin
4	R2	(Belgium) Spa-Francorchamps	22 June		(Russia) Nikolay Karamyshev	(Russia) Nikolay Karamyshev	(Czech Republic) Petr Fulín	(Luxembourg) Gilles Bruckner	(Russia) Dmitry Bragin
5	R1	(Italy) Autodromo di Pergusa	28 September	(Russia) Nikolay Karamyshev	(Russia) Nikolay Karamyshev	(Russia) Nikolay Karamyshev	(Czech Republic) Petr Fulín	(Luxembourg) Gilles Bruckner	(Hungary) Norbert Nagy
5	R2	(Italy) Autodromo di Pergusa	28 September		(Slovakia) Maťo Homola	(Ukraine) Igor Skuz	(Czech Republic) Petr Fulín	(Luxembourg) Gilles Bruckner	(Hungary) Norbert Nagy

== Championship standings ==
=== Super 2000 / Super 1600 ===
Pos	Driver	LEC (France)		SVK (Slovakia)		SAL (Austria)		SPA (Belgium)		PER (Italy)		Pts
TC2 Turbo
1	(Russia) Nikolay Karamyshev	**1**^{1}	2	14^{2}	8	1	1	**1**^{1}	1	**1**^{1}	Ret	103
2	(Slovakia) Maťo Homola	Ret	DNS	**9**^{1}	1	2^{2}	2	2^{2}	3	2^{2}	2	93
3	(Ukraine) Igor Skuz	3^{2}	**1**	15^{3}	5	**Ret**^{1}	7	3^{3}	**Ret**	4	1	79
4	(Turkey) Aytaç Biter	13	11	Ret	DNS	3^{3}	**5**	25	9	Ret^{3}	8	50
5	(Russia) Mikhail Grachev	Ret	15	5	**3**							23
6	(Germany) Franz Engstler	DNS^{3}	DNS									1
TC2
1	(Czech Republic) Petr Fulín	2^{2}	3	2^{2}	2	**6**^{1}	4	**4**^{1}	2	**3**^{1}	3	128
2	(Czech Republic) Michal Matějovský	7^{3}	16	3^{3}	7	4^{2}	6	7	**5**	5^{2}	4	84
3	(Switzerland) Peter Rikli	6	5	4	6	11	9	12	8	6	Ret	50
4	(Slovakia) Samuel Sládecka	5	7	18	9	DNS	DNS	5^{2}	Ret	Ret	7	39
5	(Switzerland) Christian Fischer	Ret	10	13	DNS	5^{3}	3	22^{3}†	17	NC^{3}	9	38
6	(Turkey) Kaan Önder	16	Ret	8	Ret	7	8	Ret	DNS	7	12	31
7	(Hungary) Norbert Kiss	**Ret**^{1}	DNS	**1**^{1}	4							24
8	(Switzerland) Andrina Gugger	8	14	Ret	13	13	12	9	7	Ret	Ret	22
9	(Slovakia) Filip Sládecka							6	4			14
10	(Bulgaria) Plamen Kralev	14	8	12	18	9	24	DNS	DNS			14
11	(Hungary) Norbert Nagy	9	**6**	6	**Ret**							13
12	(Serbia) Milovan Vesnić	15	DNS	Ret	DNS	8	**15**					7
13	(Italy) Massimo Zanin							14	12			5
14	(Turkey) Selçuk Salargil							Ret	18			1
15	(Italy) Filippo Maria Zanin							21†	DNS			1
Super 1600
1	(Luxembourg) Gilles Bruckner	DNS	DNS	21^{2}	20	18^{2}	**17**	17^{2}	**19**	15^{2}	**13**	106
2	(Germany) Ulrike Krafft	**17**^{1}	**17**	**20**^{1}	**19**	**Ret**^{1}	18	**Ret**^{1}	DNS	**17**^{1}	15	90
3	(Germany) Christian Kranenberg	18^{2}	18	24	22	19	19	24	23	16^{3}	14	84
4	(Germany) Erwin Lukas	21	20			21	21	18	20	18	16	54
5	(Ukraine) Kseniya Niks	20	21	Ret	DNS	20	22	23	21	19	17	45
6	(Switzerland) Patrick Wolf	19^{3}	19	23^{3}	21	22^{3}	20					36
7	(Luxembourg) Ben Lintgen							19^{3}	22			12
Pos	Driver	LEC (France)		SVK (Slovakia)		SAL (Austria)		SPA (Belgium)		PER (Italy)		Pts

Colour	Result
Gold	Winner
Silver	Second place
Bronze	Third place
Green	Points classification
Blue	Non-points classification
Blue	Non-classified finish (NC)
Purple	Retired, not classified (Ret)
Red	Did not qualify (DNQ)
Red	Did not pre-qualify (DNPQ)
Black	Disqualified (DSQ)
White	Did not start (DNS)
White	Withdrew (WD)
White	Race cancelled (C)
Blank	Did not practice (DNP)
Blank	Did not arrive (DNA)
Blank	Excluded (EX)

**Bold** – Pole
Italics – Fastest Lap

=== Single-makes Trophy ===
Pos	Driver	LEC (France)		SVK (Slovakia)		SAL (Austria)		SPA (Belgium)		PER (Italy)		Pts
1	(Russia) Dmitry Bragin	**Ret**^{1}	Ret	10^{2}	11	Ret^{2}	14	**8**^{1}	**6**	9^{2}	6	87
2	(Germany) Andreas Pfister	Ret^{2}	DNS	**7**^{1}	**10**	12^{3}	11	16^{2}	10	10	18†	75
3	(Finland) Aku Pellinen	4^{3}	4	17^{3}	15	**10**^{1}	**10**	20†	13			60
4	(Switzerland) Ronny Jost	11	9	16	16	15	23	13	14	11	11	59
5	(Russia) Sergey Ryabov	12	12	11	12	14	13	10^{3}	11	13^{3}	Ret	58
6	(Russia) Mikhail Maleev	10	**22**†	19	14	17	16	11	15	14	10	52
7	(Hungary) Norbert Nagy									**8**^{1}	**5**	46
8	(Russia) Vladimir Nikolaev	Ret	13	22†	17	16	Ret	15	16	12	Ret	27
—	(Switzerland) Urs Sonderegger	DNS	DNS									0
Pos	Driver	LEC (France)		SVK (Slovakia)		SAL (Austria)		SPA (Belgium)		PER (Italy)		Pts

Colour	Result
Gold	Winner
Silver	Second place
Bronze	Third place
Green	Points classification
Blue	Non-points classification
Blue	Non-classified finish (NC)
Purple	Retired, not classified (Ret)
Red	Did not qualify (DNQ)
Red	Did not pre-qualify (DNPQ)
Black	Disqualified (DSQ)
White	Did not start (DNS)
White	Withdrew (WD)
White	Race cancelled (C)
Blank	Did not practice (DNP)
Blank	Did not arrive (DNA)
Blank	Excluded (EX)

**Bold** – Pole
Italics – Fastest Lap

† — Drivers did not finish the race, but were classified as they completed over 90% of the race distance.
