= Petr Fulín =

Czech racing driver

- Nationality: (Czech Republic) Czech
- Born: 8 February 1977 (age 49) Plzeň, Czechoslovakia (now Czech Republic)

TCR International Series career
- Debut season: 2012
- Current team: Romeo Ferraris Racing Team
- Car number: 72
- Starts: 38
- Wins: 15
- Poles: 8
- Fastest laps: 12
- Best finish: 1st in 2013-14

Previous series
- 2014 2009 2009-10 2008-11 2007: WTCC; Trofeo Abarth 500 Europe; SEAT León Eurocup; SEAT León Supercopa Germany; BMW 1 Challenge

Championship titles
- 2013-14: European Touring Car Cup

Petr Fulín (born 8 February 1977) is a Czech racing driver. He competed in the European Touring Car Cup, where he has won the championship twice. He is a former World Touring Car Championship driver, who made his debut in 2014.

== Racing career ==
Fulín began his career in 2007 in the BMW 1 Challenge, finishing second in championship. In 2008, he switched to the SEAT León Supercopa Germany championship, racing in the championship for four years, finishing fourth in the championship in 2010 & 2011. Fulín also made few one-off appearances in SEAT León Eurocup and Trofeo Abarth 500 Europe, before switching to the European Touring Car Cup in 2012, winning the championships in 2013 & 2014 In 2014, Fulín made his World Touring Car Championship debut with Campos Racing driving a SEAT León WTCC in the first round of the championship in Marrakech. However after a crash in qualifying, his car was withdrawn from the event. He later raced in the fourth round of the championship in Slovakia.

In 2015, Fulín returned to the European Touring Car Cup, still racing with Krenek Motorsport however driving a SEAT León Cup Racer instead of his usual BMW 320si.

== Racing record ==
=== Complete European Touring Car Cup results ===
(key) (Races in bold indicate pole position) (Races in italics indicate fastest lap)

Year	Team	Car	1	2	3	4	5	6	7	8	9	10	11	12	DC	Points
2012	Krenek Motorsport	BMW 320si	MNZ; 1 DSQ	MNZ; 2 EX	SVK; 1; 3	SVK; 2; 1	SAL; 1; 4	SAL; 2; 3	IMO; 1; 5	IMO; 2 Ret					3rd	43
2013	Krenek Motorsport	BMW 320si	**MNZ**; **1**; 5	MNZ; 2; 3	**SVK**; **1**; 1	SVK; 2; 2	**SAL**; **1** Ret	SAL; 2 DNS	**PER**; **1**; 1	PER; 2; 2	BRN; 1; 1	BRN; 2; 1			1st	88
2014	Krenek Motorsport	BMW 320si	LEC; 1; 2	LEC; 2; 3	SVK; 1; 2	SVK; 2; 2	**SAL**; **1**; 6	SAL; 2; 4	**SPA**; **1**; 4	SPA; 2; 2	**PER**; **1**; 3	PER; 2; 3			1st	128
2015	Krenek Motorsport	SEAT León Cup Racer	HUN; 1; 3	HUN; 2; 3	**SVK**; **1**; 1	SVK; 2; 4	LEC; 1; 2	LEC; 2; 12	BRN; 1; 4	BRN; 2 Ret	ZOL; 1; 2	ZOL; 2; 4	PER; 1; 1	PER; 2; 3	2nd	107

=== Complete World Touring Car Championship results ===
(key) (Races in bold indicate pole position – 1 point awarded just in first race; races in italics indicate fastest lap – 1 point awarded all races; * signifies that driver led race for at least one lap – 1 point given all races)

Year	Team	Car	1	2	3	4	5	6	7	8	9	10	11	12	13	14	15	16	17	18	19	20	21	22	23	24	DC	Pts
2014	Campos Racing	SEAT León WTCC	MAR; 1 DNS	MAR; 2 DNS	FRA; 1	FRA; 2	HUN; 1	HUN; 2	SVK; 1; 15	SVK; 2 C	AUT; 1	AUT; 2	RUS; 1	RUS; 2	BEL; 1	BEL; 2	ARG; 1	ARG; 2	BEI; 1	BEI; 2	CHN; 1	CHN; 2	JPN; 1	JPN; 2	MAC; 1	MAC; 2	NC	0

=== Complete TCR International Series results ===
(key) (Races in bold indicate pole position; races in italics indicate fastest lap)

Year	Team	Car	1	2	3	4	5	6	7	8	9	10	11	12	13	14	15	16	17	18	19	20	21	22	DC	Points
2016	Mulsanne Racing	Alfa Romeo Giulietta TCR	BHR; 1	BHR; 2	EST; 1	EST; 2	SPA; 1	SPA; 2	IMO; 1	IMO; 2	SAL; 1 Ret	SAL; 2 DNS	OSC; 1; 13†	OSC; 2 Ret	SOC; 1; 6	SOC; 2; 8	CHA; 1; 20†	CHA; 2 DNS	MRN; 1 NC	MRN; 2; 9	SEP; 1	SEP; 2	MAC; 1 Ret	MAC; 2 DNS	19th	15

^{†} Driver did not finish the race, but was classified as he completed over 75% of the race distance.

=== Complete World Touring Car Cup results ===
(key) (Races in bold indicate pole position) (Races in italics indicate fastest lap)

Year	Team	Car	1	2	3	4	5	6	7	8	9	10	11	12	13	14	15	16	17	18	19	20	21	22	23	24	25	26	27	28	29	30	DC	Points
2018	Fullin Race Academy	Cupra León TCR	MAR; 1	MAR; 2	MAR; 3	HUN; 1	HUN; 2	HUN; 3	GER; 1	GER; 2	GER; 3	NED; 1	NED; 2	NED; 3	POR; 1	POR; 2	POR; 3	SVK; 1; 15	SVK; 2; 20	SVK; 3; 5	CHN; 1	CHN; 2	CHN; 3	WUH; 1	WUH; 2	WUH; 3	JPN; 1	JPN; 2	JPN; 3	MAC; 1	MAC; 2	MAC; 3	27th	13
2020	Vexta Dorny	CUPRA León Competición TCR	BEL; 1	BEL; 2	GER; 1	GER; 2	SVK; 1; 18	SVK; 2; 11	SVK; 3; 14	HUN; 1	HUN; 2	HUN; 3	ESP; 1	ESP; 2	ESP; 3	ARA; 1	ARA; 2	ARA; 3															NC‡	0‡
2021	Full In Race Academy	CUPRA León Competición TCR	GER; 1	GER; 2	POR; 1	POR; 2	ESP; 1	ESP; 2	HUN; 1	HUN; 2	CZE; 1 Ret	CZE; 2; 11	FRA; 1	FRA; 2	ITA; 1	ITA; 2	RUS; 1	RUS; 2															NC‡	0‡

^{‡} As Fulín was a Wildcard entry, he was ineligible to score points.
