= Aurélien Comte =

French racing driver

- Nationality: (France) French
- Born: 11 September 1988 (age 38) Paris, Île-de-France, France

TCR International Series career
- Debut season: 2017
- Current team: DG Sport Compétition
- Car number: 27
- Starts: 2

Previous series
- 2017 2017 2016 2016-17 2014-16 2013 2010-12 2006-08 2005-06: TCR International Series; TCR Europe Trophy; Championnat de France Prototypes; TCR BeNeLux Touring Car Championship; Peugeot RCZ Racing Cup France; European Touring Car Cup; SEAT León Supercopa France; Renault Clio Cup France; Karting

Championship titles
- 2017 2014-15: TCR Europe Trophy; Peugeot RCZ Racing Cup France

Aurélien Comte (born 11 September 1988) is a French racing driver currently competing in the TCR International Series and the TCR BeNeLux Touring Car Championship. Having previously competed in the European Touring Car Cup, SEAT León Supercopa France and Renault Clio Cup France amongst others.

== Racing career ==
Comte began his career in 2005 in Karting and continued in karting until 2006. In 2006, he switched to the Renault Clio Cup France series. He continued in the series up until 2008 where he finished fourth in the championship standings having finished eighth in 2007. For 2010, he switched to the SEAT León Supercopa France series, finishing sixth in the championship standings in his first year in the series. He continued in the series in 2011, taking a single victory and several podiums on his way to finishing fifth in the standings. 2012 was his last year in the series and he finished it by taking several victories, podiums, and pole positions as well as finishing third in the standings. In 2013, he took part in the European Touring Car Cups Single-Makes Trophy class, finishing third in the class standings after several victories in class. In 2014, he switched to the Peugeot RCZ Racing Cup France series, winning the championship after taking eight victories out of thirteen possible. He continued in the series in 2015, again winning the championship. For 2016, he raced in three different championships, like in 2014 and 2015, he raced in the Peugeot RCZ Racing Cup France. However, he only took part in one championship round. He also made one-off appearances in the TCR BeNeLux Touring Car Championship and Championnat de France Prototypes series.

For 2017, Comte returned full-time to the TCR BeNeLux Touring Car Championship, partnering Kevin Abbring in the Peugeot 308 Racing Cup, with the pair taking several victories and finishing fourth in the standings. After finishing the 2017 TCR BeNeLux Touring Car Championship season, he went on to compete in the one-off TCR Europe Trophy event again driving for his TCR BeNeLux team DG Sport Compétition and still driving the Peugeot. Comte went on to finish third in Race and finished second in Race 2, which was won by Gabriele Tarquini. However, since Tarquini was ineligible for points, the victory went to him and he became the 2017 TCR Europe Trophy champion.

In November 2017, it was announced that Comte would race in the TCR International Series, driving an Opel Astra TCR for his TCR BeNeLux team DG Sport Compétition.

== Racing record ==
=== Complete TCR International Series results ===
(key) (Races in bold indicate pole position) (Races in italics indicate fastest lap)

Year	Team	Car	1	2	3	4	5	6	7	8	9	10	11	12	13	14	15	16	17	18	19	20	DC	Points
2017	DG Sport Compétition	Opel Astra TCR	RIM; 1	RIM; 2	BHR; 1	BHR; 2	SPA; 1	SPA; 2	MNZ; 1	MNZ; 2	SAL; 1	SAL; 2	HUN; 1	HUN; 2	OSC; 1	OSC; 2	CHA; 1	CHA; 2	ZHE; 1	ZHE; 2	DUB; 1 Ret	DUB; 2; 16†	NC	0

^{†} Driver did not finish the race but was classified as he completed over 90% of the race distance.

=== Complete World Touring Car Cup results ===
(key) (Races in bold indicate pole position) (Races in italics indicate fastest lap)

Year	Team	Car	1	2	3	4	5	6	7	8	9	10	11	12	13	14	15	16	17	18	19	20	21	22	23	24	25	26	27	28	29	30	DC	Points
2018	DG Sport Compétition	Peugeot 308 TCR	MAR; 1; 8	MAR; 2 Ret	MAR; 3 DNS	HUN; 1; 17	HUN; 2; 16	HUN; 3; 13	GER; 1; 18	GER; 2; 13	GER; 3; 15	NED; 1; 2	NED; 2; 1	NED; 3; 7	POR; 1; 6	POR; 2 Ret	POR; 3 DNS	SVK; 1; 4	SVK; 2; 13	SVK; 3; 2	CHN; 1; 16	CHN; 2 Ret	CHN; 3; 16	WUH; 1; 5	WUH; 2; 2	WUH; 3 Ret	**JPN**; **1**; 2	JPN; 2; 7	JPN; 3; 2	MAC; 1; 20	MAC; 2; 12	MAC; 3; 16	11th	191
2020	Vuković Motorsport	Renault Mégane R.S TCR	BEL; 1	BEL; 2	GER; 1	GER; 2	SVK; 1; 16	SVK; 2; 12	SVK; 3; 12	HUN; 1; 17	HUN; 2; 19†	HUN; 3; 19	ESP; 1 Ret	ESP; 2 NC	ESP; 3 Ret	ARA; 1; 14	ARA; 2; 12	ARA; 3; 17															19th	17

^{†} Driver did not finish the race, but was classified as he completed over 90% of the race distance.

=== Complete TCR Europe Touring Car Series results ===
(key) (Races in bold indicate pole position) (Races in italics indicate fastest lap)

Year	Team	Car	1	2	3	4	5	6	7	8	9	10	11	12	13	14	DC	Points
2019	DG Sport Compétition	Peugeot 308 TCR	HUN; 1; 7	HUN; 2 Ret	HOC; 1; 7	HOC; 2; 2	SPA; 1; 4	SPA; 2; 5	RBR; 1 Ret	RBR; 2; 10	OSC; 1 Ret	OSC; 2; 13	CAT; 1; 19	CAT; 2; 15	MNZ; 1; 2	MNZ; 2; 7	7th	197
2023	SP Competition	Cupra Leon Competición TCR	ALG; 1	ALG; 2	PAU; 1	PAU; 2	SPA; 1	SPA; 2	HUN; 1	HUN; 2	LEC; 1; 5^{5}	LEC; 2; 5	MNZ; 1	MNZ; 2	CAT; 1	CAT; 2	18th	51
2024	SP Competition	Cupra León VZ TCR	VAL; 1; 2^{3}	VAL; 2; 1	ZOL; 1; 2^{2}	ZOL; 2; 5	SAL; 1; 4^{5}	SAL; 2; 3	SPA; 1; 4^{3}	SPA; 2; 6	BRN; 1; 2^{2}	BRN; 2; 8	CRT; 1; 3^{5}	CRT; 2; 4			2nd	382

=== TCR Spa 500 results ===
Year	Team	Co-Drivers	Car	Class	Laps	Pos.	Class Pos.
2019	(Belgium) DG Sport Compétition	(France) Julien Briché (France) Teddy Clairet	Peugeot 308 TCR	**P**	449	**2nd**	**2nd**

=== Complete TCR World Tour results ===
(key) (Races in bold indicate pole position) (Races in italics indicate fastest lap)

Year	Team	Car	1	2	3	4	5	6	7	8	9	10	11	12	13	14	15	16	17	18	19	20	21	DC	Points
2023	SP Competition	Cupra León Competición TCR	ALG; 1	ALG; 2	SPA; 1	SPA; 2	VAL; 1; 16	VAL; 2; 9	HUN; 1	HUN; 2	ELP; 1	ELP; 2	VIL; 1	VIL; 2	SYD; 1	SYD; 2	SYD; 3	BAT; 1	BAT; 2	BAT; 3	MAC; 1	MAC; 2		49th	4
2025	SP Competition	Cupra León VZ TCR	AHR; 1; 5	AHR; 2; 3	AHR; 3; 5	CRT; 1; 14	CRT; 2; 16	CRT; 3; 13	MNZ; 1 Ret	MNZ; 2; 1	CVR; 1; 4	CVR; 2; 4	BEN; 1 C	BEN; 2; 11	BEN; 3; 4	INJ; 1; 6	INJ; 2 Ret	INJ; 3; 7	**ZHZ**; **1**; 1	ZHZ; 2; 10	ZHZ; 3; 1	MAC; 1; 12	MAC; 2; 12	7th	294
2026	SP Competition	Cupra León VZ TCR	MIS; 1; 6	MIS; 2; 4	CRT; 1; 3	CRT; 2; 2	CRT; 3; 5	LEC; 1; 4	LEC; 2 Ret	CVR; 1; 6	CVR; 2; 2	INJ; 1; 4	INJ; 2 Ret	INJ; 3; 5	CHE; 1; 7	CHE; 2; 1	CHE; 3; 5	ZHZ; 1; 6	ZHZ; 2; 1	ZHZ; 3; 6	MAC; 1	MAC; 2		5th*	336*

^{*} Season still in progress.
