= Norbert Nagy =

Hungarian racing driver

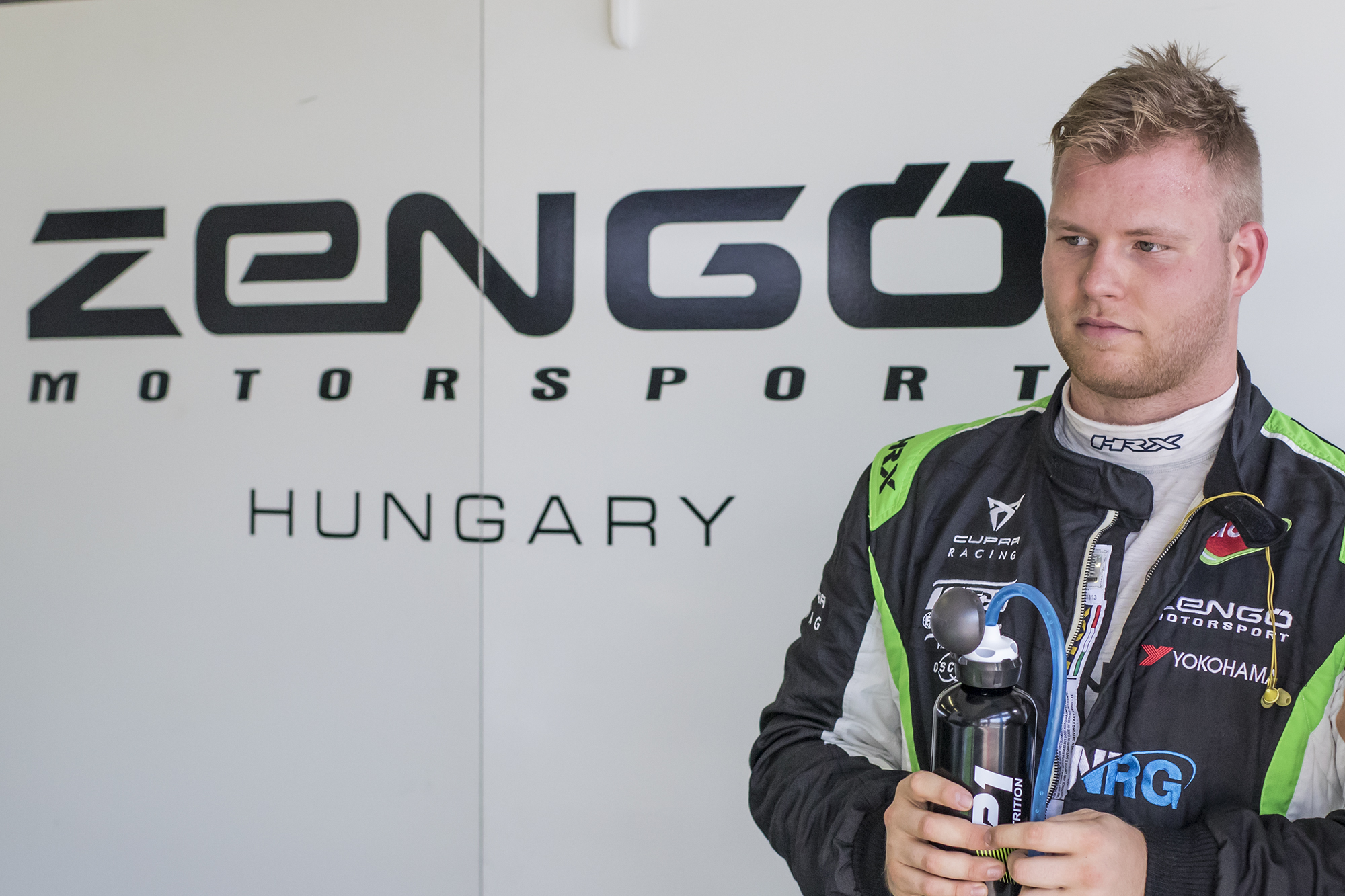
- Nationality: Hungarian
- Born: 23 December 1994 (age 31) Budapest, Hungary

Previous series
- 2013-2016 2014 2012 2011 2010 2000-08: ETCC; WTCC; SEAT León Supercopa Hungary; Central European Zone Challenge; Hungarian Touring Car Championship; Karting

Championship titles
- 2012 2010: SEAT León Supercopa Hungary; Hungarian Touring Car Championship

Norbert Nagy (born 23 December 1994 in Budapest) is a Hungarian racing driver who competed in the European Touring Car Cup. He made his ETCC debut in 2013 and in 2016 finished 3rd in the Championship. Nagy has also raced in several WTCC events over the last few years.

== Racing career ==
Nagy began his career in 2000 in karting. In 2010, he switched to the Hungarian Touring Car Championship, winning the F1.6 class that year. In 2011, Nagy raced in the Central European Zone Challenge, taking two race wins. Nagy switched to the SEAT León Supercopa Hungary in 2012, winning the championship in the end of the year. In 2013, he switched to the European Touring Car Cup, racing in the championship for two years. In 2014, Nagy made his World Touring Car Championship debut with Campos Racing driving a SEAT León WTCC in the Belgian round of the championship.

== Racing record ==
=== Complete European Touring Car Cup results ===
(key) (Races in bold indicate pole position) (Races in italics indicate fastest lap)

| Year | Team | Car | 1 | 2 | 3 | 4 | 5 | 6 | 7 | 8 | 9 | 10 | DC | Points |
|---|---|---|---|---|---|---|---|---|---|---|---|---|---|---|
| 2013 | Zengő Junior Team | SEAT León Supercopa | MNZ; 1; 18 | MNZ; 2; 11 | SVK; 1; 7 | **SVK**; **2**; **7** | SAL; 1; 8 | **SAL**; **2**; **4** | PER; 1; 9 | PER; 2; 12 | BRN; 1; 12 | BRN; 2; 11 | 7th | 32 |
| 2014 | MGS Racing Team | Chevrolet Cruze LT | LEC; 1; 9 | **LEC**; **2**; **6** | SVK; 1; 6 | **SVK**; **2**; **Ret** | SAL; 1 | SAL; 2 | SPA; 1 | SPA; 2 | | | 11th | 13 |
| 2014 | MGS Racing Team | SEAT León Supercopa | | | | | | | | | **PER**; **1**; **8** | PER; 2; 5 | 7th | 46 |

=== Complete World Touring Car Championship results ===
(key) (Races in bold indicate pole position – 1 point awarded just in first race; races in italics indicate fastest lap – 1 point awarded all races; * signifies that driver led race for at least one lap – 1 point given all races)

| Year | Team | Car | 1 | 2 | 3 | 4 | 5 | 6 | 7 | 8 | 9 | 10 | 11 | 12 | 13 | 14 | 15 | 16 | 17 | 18 | 19 | 20 | 21 | 22 | 23 | 24 | DC | Pts |
|---|---|---|---|---|---|---|---|---|---|---|---|---|---|---|---|---|---|---|---|---|---|---|---|---|---|---|---|---|
| 2014 | Campos Racing | SEAT León WTCC | MAR; 1 | MAR; 2 | FRA; 1 | FRA; 2 | HUN; 1 | HUN; 2 | SVK; 1 | SVK; 2 | AUT; 1 | AUT; 2 | RUS; 1 | RUS; 2 | BEL; 1; 20 | BEL; 2; 18 | ARG; 1 | ARG; 2 | CHN1; 1 | CHN1; 2 | CHN2; 1 | CHN2; 2 | JPN; 1 | JPN; 2 | MAC; 1 | MAC; 2 | NC | 0 |

=== Complete World Touring Car Cup results ===
(key) (Races in bold indicate pole position) (Races in italics indicate fastest lap)

| Year | Team | Car | 1 | 2 | 3 | 4 | 5 | 6 | 7 | 8 | 9 | 10 | 11 | 12 | 13 | 14 | 15 | 16 | 17 | 18 | 19 | 20 | 21 | 22 | 23 | 24 | 25 | 26 | 27 | 28 | 29 | 30 | DC | Points |
|---|---|---|---|---|---|---|---|---|---|---|---|---|---|---|---|---|---|---|---|---|---|---|---|---|---|---|---|---|---|---|---|---|---|---|
| 2018 | Zengő Motorsport | Cupra León TCR | MAR; 1; 16 | MAR; 2; 16 | MAR; 3; 15 | HUN; 1 Ret | HUN; 2; 11 | HUN; 3; 11 | GER; 1; 21 | GER; 2; 17 | GER; 3; 17 | NED; 1; 17 | NED; 2; 20 | NED; 3; 17 | POR; 1; 14 | POR; 2; 13 | POR; 3 Ret | SVK; 1; 11 | SVK; 2; 2 | SVK; 3 Ret | CHN; 1 Ret | CHN; 2; 20 | CHN; 3; 15 | WUH; 1 Ret | WUH; 2 Ret | WUH; 3; 16 | JPN; 1; 22 | JPN; 2; 21 | JPN; 3; 17 | MAC; 1; 23 | MAC; 2; 23 | MAC; 3; 20 | 25th | 18 |
