= Unicorse Team =

(Hungary) Unicorse Team
- Founded: 2009
- Team principal(s): Zsolt Borbandi
- Current series: TCR International Series; FIA Central European Zone Circuit Championship
- Former series: European Touring Car Cup
- Noted drivers: TCR; 20. (Hungary) Márk Jedlóczky; FIA CEZ; 15. (Hungary) Richárd Király
- Website: http://unicorse.hu

Unicorse Team is a Hungarian auto racing team based in Tevel, Hungary. The team has raced in the TCR International Series, since 2017. The team also races in the FIA Central European Zone Circuit Championship. Having previously raced in the European Touring Car Cup amongst others.

== European Touring Car Cup ==
Having first entered the championship in 2012, running a single Alfa Romeo 156 S2000 for Ferenc Ficza for the first two rounds, before Csapa Gáspár took over the car for the third round of the championship. Ficza finished eighth in the drivers championship, with Gáspár finishing tenth in the standings. They returned in 2013 again running an Alfa Romeo 156 S2000 for Slovak Filip Sládečka for two rounds, with Sládecka and the team battling with technical issues and only starting one out of four races. In 2014 the team again entered their Alfa Romeo 156 S2000 for Norbert Kiss, with Kiss taking the teams first ETCC victory in the first race at the Automotodróm Slovakia Ring. For the championships fourth round 2013 driver Filip Sládečka joined them, replacing Kiss. Kiss finished seventh in the standings while Sládečka finished ninth.

== TCR International Series ==
=== Alfa Romeo Giulietta TCR (2017–) ===
After having raced in the FIA Central European Zone Circuit Championship, the team entered the 2017 TCR International Series with Márk Jedlóczky driving an Alfa Romeo Giulietta TCR. Jedlóczky qualified 21st and finished 16th in Race 1 before finishing 15th in Race 2.
