= 2013 FIA WTCC Race of Russia =

Race details
- Round 6 of 12 in the 2013 World Touring Car Championship at Moscow Raceway in Volokolamsk, Russia.
- Date: 9 June, 2013
- Location: Volokolamsk, Russia
- Course: Moscow Raceway; 3.931 kilometres (2.443 mi)

Race One
- Laps: 15
Pole position
Driver		(France) Yvan Muller	RML
Time		1:43.335	
Podium
First		(France) Yvan Muller	RML
Second		(Netherlands) Tom Coronel	ROAL Motorsport
Third		(Hungary) Norbert Michelisz	Zengő Motorsport
Fastest Lap
Driver		(Netherlands) Tom Coronel	ROAL Motorsport
Time		1:44.179	

Race Two
- Laps: 13
Podium
First		(Denmark) Michel Nykjær	NIKA Racing
Second		(France) Yvan Muller	RML
Third		(United Kingdom) Robert Huff	Münnich Motorsport
Fastest Lap
Driver		(Denmark) Michel Nykjær	NIKA Racing
Time		1:44.456	

The 2013 FIA WTCC Race of Russia (formally the 2013 FIA WTCC Lukoil Race of Russia) was the sixth round of the 2013 World Touring Car Championship season and the maiden running of the FIA WTCC Race of Russia. It was held on 9 June 2013 at the Moscow Raceway in Volokolamsk, Russia, 97 kilometres (60 miles) from Moscow.

Race one was won by Yvan Muller of RML who started from pole position. Race two was won by Michel Nykjær for NIKA Racing.

== Background ==
After the last round in Austria, Yvan Muller was leading the world drivers' championship and James Nash was leading the Yokohama Independents' Trophy.

The SEAT cars were allowed a 10 kg weight reduction under the compensation weights system after the Austrian round, taking their weight down to 1,160 kg. The Chevrolet and Honda cars remained at their maximum weights of 1,190 kg while the BMW 320 TCs maintained their base weight of 1,150 kg. The Lada cars continued to be the lightest cars on the grid at 1,130 kg for their home race.

European Touring Car Cup regular Nikolay Karamyshev joined Campos Racing for his home race, replacing Hugo Valente on a two race deal for Russia and the following round in Portugal.

== Report ==
=== Testing and free practice ===
Muller was the quickest driver in Friday's test session which took place on a drying track. Gabriele Tarquini was running third having topped the times in the first half of the session, and Tom Coronel was the second fastest.

Coronel was fastest in the first free practice session on Saturday morning, ahead of Robert Huff and Muller. Karamyshev was tenth quickest in this session. Muller then led an RML 1–2 in the second practice session.

=== Qualifying ===
Coronel had been fastest in the first part of qualifying which remained dry despite a threat of rain. A number of drivers were close to dropping out of qualifying in the first session with Huff and Norbert Michelisz getting through after late improvements. The first driver to drop out in Q1 was Fredy Barth who was just over one–hundredth of a second off Michelisz's time. Tiago Monteiro was 22nd after a water pump problem on his Honda Civic.

The weather changed in Q2 as it started to rain. This meant that there were very few flying laps. Muller set the benchmark time of 1:45.335 with the fastest times being slower in the session as the rain got heavier. Coronel was second ahead of Huff, Michelisz and Tarquini. James Thompson was sixth at Lada's home race. Mehdi Bennani was tenth to secure pole position on the reversed grid for race two, he would then start alongside Liqui Moly Team Engstler's Charles Ng. Yokohama Trophy points leader missed out on the reversed grid in eleventh ahead of his former teammate Tom Chilton in twelfth.

After qualifying, both of the Campos Racing cars had their lap times removed. Karamyshev failed to stop and get his car weighed after the session while his teammate Fernando Monje's car failed the scrutineering check. Castrol Honda World Touring Car Team driver Monteiro received a grid penalty for race one when the team decided to change the engine as a precaution after experiencing overheating issues.

=== Warm-Up ===
Thompson led the warm–up session on Sunday morning. Ng ended his session stuck in one of the gravel traps while Tarquini had a minor collision with a tyre wall which ended his running.

=== Race One ===
Muller led away from pole, there was some light contact with Coronel at the first corner while Barth and Ng behind collided, putting both out of the race on the spot. Karamyshev was clipped by Ng's car as he tried to avoid the incident and returned to the pits for repairs. Darryl O'Young was also caught out by the collision and returned to the pits for repairs to his suspension. The safety car came out as the debris was cleared up, the race was then red flagged on lap four. The rescue vehicle that was recovering the stricken BMW of Ng broke down and the marshals were required to remove the car manually. When the recovery vehicle had been removed, the race was restarted with the recovery vehicle still in place when it could not be removed, the race continued with a permanent yellow flag at the first corner. Further back there was a close battle between Monteiro, Marc Basseng, Alex MacDowall and Mikhail Kozlovskiy. Up at the front, Coronel had closed in on Muller while Huff was still trying to take the final podium place off Michelisz. Throughout the field there was generally very little overtaking with the best overtaking spot at turn one unavailable. Coronel was close but was unable to pass Muller who won, Michelisz was third after holding off Huff's advances. Thompson in fifth secured Lada's best ever result in the World Touring Car Championship.

After the race, Oriola, Basseng and Karamyshev were issued with 30–second penalties when the three drivers were deemed to have made false starts. With Oriola losing his eighth place, Stefano D'Aste was promoted into the final points paying position.

=== Race Two ===
Before the race, Ng was dropped to the back of the grid when Engstler Motorsport broke parc ferme regulations to repair his car. This promoted Nykjær to the front row, alongside Bennani. Bennani had a fast start from pole position and quickly distanced himself from the rest of the field. Oriola passed Tarquini on the opening lap, the Honda then went to retake the position but tapped Oriola and spun him. On the second lap, Nykjær began to close in on Bennani, setting the fastest lap of the race. On lap three, Tarquini and Coronel were disputing third place – the two made contact while they allowed Thompson to make it a three-way battle. Going up the pit straight at the start of lap four, Huff made it a four-way battle and the quartet ran side by side until Coronel spun around the front of Tarquini's car and collided with Thompson at the first corner. Nykjær had caught up with Benanni at the end of lap four and looked likely to take the lead, Bennani stayed up the inside of the Chevrolet at the final corner, Nykjær ran out wide and Bennani retained the lead. Nykjær took the lead on lap seven. At the end of lap nine, Huff attempted a pass on Bennani at the final corner, the move did not stick and it allowed Bennani and Muller who had been close behind to get in front of the SEAT. At the end of lap eleven, Huff made another attempt to pass Bennani and pulled it off when Bennani spun on the exit of the corner, dropping the Proteam Racing driver to fourteenth. Nykjær held on to win ahead of Muller and Huff.

== Results ==
=== Qualifying ===
Pos.	No.	Name	Team	Car	C	Q1	Q2	Points
1	12	(France) Yvan Muller	RML	Chevrolet Cruze 1.6T		1:43.296	1:43.335	**5**
2	15	(Netherlands) Tom Coronel	ROAL Motorsport	BMW 320 TC		1:42.966	1:43.405	**4**
3	1	(United Kingdom) Robert Huff	ALL-INKL.COM Münnich Motorsport	SEAT León WTCC		1:43.705	1:43.466	**3**
4	5	(Hungary) Norbert Michelisz	Zengő Motorsport	Honda Civic WTCC		1:43.829	1:43.772	**2**
5	3	(Italy) Gabriele Tarquini	Castrol Honda World Touring Car Team	Honda Civic WTCC		1:43.759	1:43.840	**1**
6	10	(United Kingdom) James Thompson	Lukoil Lada Sport	Lada Granta		1:43.481	1:43.982	
7	74	(Spain) Pepe Oriola	Tuenti Racing Team	SEAT León WTCC		1:43.450	1:43.992	
8	17	(Denmark) Michel Nykjær	NIKA Racing	Chevrolet Cruze 1.6T	Y	1:43.669	1:44.157	
9	7	(Hong Kong) Charles Ng	Liqui Moly Team Engstler	BMW 320 TC	Y	1:43.740	1:44.421	
10	25	(Morocco) **Mehdi Bennani**	Proteam Racing	BMW 320 TC	Y	1:43.674	1:44.438	
11	14	(United Kingdom) James Nash	bamboo-engineering	Chevrolet Cruze 1.6T	Y	1:43.699	1:45.119	
12	23	(United Kingdom) Tom Chilton	RML	Chevrolet Cruze 1.6T		1:43.262	1:45.240	
13	73	(Switzerland) Fredy Barth	Wiechers-Sport	BMW 320 TC	Y	1:43.850		
14	55	(Hong Kong) Darryl O'Young	ROAL Motorsport	BMW 320 TC	Y	1:44.060		
15	38	(Germany) Marc Basseng	ALL-INKL.COM Münnich Motorsport	SEAT León WTCC		1:44.150		
16	9	(United Kingdom) Alex MacDowall	bamboo-engineering	Chevrolet Cruze 1.6T	Y	1:44.193		
17	26	(Italy) Stefano D'Aste	PB Racing	BMW 320 TC	Y	1:44.265		
18	8	(Russia) Mikhail Kozlovskiy	Lukoil Lada Sport	Lada Granta		1:44.435		
19	6	(Germany) Franz Engstler	Liqui Moly Team Engstler	BMW 320 TC	Y	1:44.476		
20	18	(Portugal) Tiago Monteiro	Castrol Honda World Touring Car Team	Honda Civic WTCC		1:44.610		
21	37	(Germany) René Münnich	ALL-INKL.COM Münnich Motorsport	SEAT León WTCC	Y	1:44.685		
107% time: 1:50.173
EX^{1}	19	(Spain) Fernando Monje	Campos Racing	SEAT León WTCC	Y	Excluded		
EX^{2}	21	(Russia) Nikolay Karamyshev	Campos Racing	SEAT León WTCC	Y	Excluded		

- **Bold** denotes Pole position for second race.

^1 — Monje had his times removed when his car failed the scrutineering checks.
^2 — Karamyshev had his times deleted when he didn't stop to have his car weighed after qualifying.

=== Race 1 ===
Pos.	No.	Name	Team	Car	C	Laps	Time/Retired	Grid	Points
1	12	(France) **Yvan Muller**	RML	Chevrolet Cruze 1.6T		15	51:37.955	1	25
2	15	(Netherlands) Tom Coronel	ROAL Motorsport	BMW 320 TC		15	+0.511	2	18
3	5	(Hungary) Norbert Michelisz	Zengő Motorsport	Honda Civic WTCC		15	+5.327	4	15
4	1	(United Kingdom) Robert Huff	ALL-INKL.COM Münnich Motorsport	SEAT León WTCC		15	+6.685	3	12
5	10	(United Kingdom) James Thompson	Lukoil Lada Sport	Lada Granta		15	+10.549	6	10
6	3	(Italy) Gabriele Tarquini	Castrol Honda World Touring Car Team	Honda Civic WTCC		15	+10.718	5	8
7	17	(Denmark) Michel Nykjær	NIKA Racing	Chevrolet Cruze 1.6T	Y	15	+11.053	8	6
8	14	(United Kingdom) James Nash	bamboo-engineering	Chevrolet Cruze 1.6T	Y	15	+15.047	11	4
9	23	(United Kingdom) Tom Chilton	RML	Chevrolet Cruze 1.6T		15	+15.420	12	2
10	26	(Italy) Stefano D'Aste	PB Racing	BMW 320 TC	Y	15	+15.571	17	1
11	25	(Morocco) Mehdi Bennani	Proteam Racing	BMW 320 TC	Y	15	+16.111	10	
12	18	(Portugal) Tiago Monteiro	Castrol Honda World Touring Car Team	Honda Civic WTCC		15	+18.257	21	
13	9	(United Kingdom) Alex MacDowall	bamboo-engineering	Chevrolet Cruze 1.6T	Y	15	+20.716	16	
14	8	(Russia) Mikhail Kozlovskiy	Lukoil Lada Sport	Lada Granta		15	+29.113	18	
15	19	(Spain) Fernando Monje	Campos Racing	SEAT León WTCC	Y	15	+29.269	22	
16	37	(Germany) René Münnich	ALL-INKL.COM Münnich Motorsport	SEAT León WTCC	Y	15	+31.673	20	
17	74	(Spain) Pepe Oriola	Tuenti Racing Team	SEAT León WTCC		15	+44.252	7	
18	38	(Germany) Marc Basseng	ALL-INKL.COM Münnich Motorsport	SEAT León WTCC		15	+49.996	15	
19	6	(Germany) Franz Engstler	Liqui Moly Team Engstler	BMW 320 TC	Y	13	+2 Laps	19	
20	55	(Hong Kong) Darryl O'Young	ROAL Motorsport	BMW 320 TC	Y	12	+3 Laps	14	
21	21	(Russia) Nikolay Karamyshev	Campos Racing	SEAT León WTCC	Y	12	+3 Laps	23	
Ret	73	(Switzerland) Fredy Barth	Wiechers-Sport	BMW 320 TC	Y	0	Race incident	13	
Ret	7	(Hong Kong) Charles Ng	Liqui Moly Team Engstler	BMW 320 TC	Y	0	Race incident	9	

- **Bold** denotes Fastest lap.

=== Race 2 ===
Pos.	No.	Name	Team	Car	C	Laps	Time/Retired	Grid	Points
1	17	(Denmark) **Michel Nykjær**	NIKA Racing	Chevrolet Cruze 1.6T	Y	13	22:53.698	2	25
2	12	(France) Yvan Muller	RML	Chevrolet Cruze 1.6T		13	+0.379	9	18
3	1	(United Kingdom) Robert Huff	ALL-INKL.COM Münnich Motorsport	SEAT León WTCC		13	+6.418	7	15
4	74	(Spain) Pepe Oriola	Tuenti Racing Team	SEAT León WTCC		13	+7.494	3	12
5	5	(Hungary) Norbert Michelisz	Zengő Motorsport	Honda Civic WTCC		13	+8.075	6	10
6	23	(United Kingdom) Tom Chilton	RML	Chevrolet Cruze 1.6T		13	+8.682	11	8
7	3	(Italy) Gabriele Tarquini	Castrol Honda World Touring Car Team	Honda Civic WTCC		13	+9.537	5	6
8	26	(Italy) Stefano D'Aste	PB Racing	BMW 320 TC	Y	13	+10.306	15	4
9	55	(Hong Kong) Darryl O'Young	ROAL Motorsport	BMW 320 TC	Y	13	+13.427	12	2
10	14	(United Kingdom) James Nash	bamboo-engineering	Chevrolet Cruze 1.6T	Y	13	+14.223	10	1
11	9	(United Kingdom) Alex MacDowall	bamboo-engineering	Chevrolet Cruze 1.6T	Y	13	+16.581	14	
12	18	(Portugal) Tiago Monteiro	Castrol Honda World Touring Car Team	Honda Civic WTCC		13	+17.560	18	
13	38	(Germany) Marc Basseng	ALL-INKL.COM Münnich Motorsport	SEAT León WTCC		13	+18.776	13	
14	15	(Netherlands) Tom Coronel	ROAL Motorsport	BMW 320 TC		13	+20.716	8	
15	6	(Germany) Franz Engstler	Liqui Moly Team Engstler	BMW 320 TC	Y	13	+21.031	17	
16	25	(Morocco) Mehdi Bennani	Proteam Racing	BMW 320 TC	Y	13	+22.834	1	
17	21	(Russia) Nikolay Karamyshev	Campos Racing	SEAT León WTCC	Y	13	+23.852	21	
18	19	(Spain) Fernando Monje	Campos Racing	SEAT León WTCC	Y	13	+24.400	20	
19	37	(Germany) René Münnich	ALL-INKL.COM Münnich Motorsport	SEAT León WTCC	Y	11	+2 Laps	19	
Ret	8	(Russia) Mikhail Kozlovskiy	Lukoil Lada Sport	Lada Granta		7		16	
Ret	10	(United Kingdom) James Thompson	Lukoil Lada Sport	Lada Granta		4	Race incident	4	
Ret	7	(Hong Kong) Charles Ng	Liqui Moly Team Engstler	BMW 320 TC	Y	1	Suspension	22	
DNS	73	(Switzerland) Fredy Barth	Wiechers-Sport	BMW 320 TC	Y	0	Did not start	–	

- **Bold** denotes Fastest lap.

== Standings after the event ==
Drivers' Championship standings

	Pos	Driver	Points
	1	(France) Yvan Muller	246
	2	(Italy) Gabriele Tarquini	133
1	3	(Denmark) Michel Nykjær	127
1	4	(United Kingdom) James Nash	113
	5	(United Kingdom) Robert Huff	107

Yokohama Independents' Trophy standings

	Pos	Driver	Points
1	1	(Denmark) Michel Nykjær	92
1	2	(United Kingdom) James Nash	91
	3	(United Kingdom) Alex MacDowall	74
	4	(Morocco) Mehdi Bennani	54
2	5	(Italy) Stefano D'Aste	38

Manufacturers' Championship standings

Pos	Manufacturer	Points
1	(Japan) Honda	509
2	(Russia) Lada	283

- Note: Only the top five positions are included for both sets of drivers' standings.
