= 2018 FIA WTCR Race of Morocco =

Race details
- Round 1 of 10 in the 2018 World Touring Car Cup
| Date | 7–8 April 2018 |
| Official name | FIA WTCR Afriquia Race of Morocco |
| Location | Circuit International Automobile Moulay El Hassan, Marrakesh, Morocco |
| Distance | Race One; 20 laps / 59.42 km (36.92 mi) |
| Distance | Race Two; 20 laps / 59.42 km (36.92 mi) |
| Distance | Race Three; 23 laps / 68.333 km (42.460 mi) |
- Race 1

Pole
| Driver | (Sweden) Thed Björk | (France) M Racing-YMR |
- Time 1:24.698

Fastest lap
| Driver | (Italy) Gabriele Tarquini | (Italy) BRC Racing Team |
| Time | 1:26.450 |

Podium
| First | (Italy) Gabriele Tarquini | (Italy) BRC Racing Team |
| Second | (Sweden) Thed Björk | (France) M Racing-YMR |
| Third | (United Kingdom) Robert Huff | (France) Sébastien Loeb Racing |
- Race 2

Fastest lap
| Driver | (France) Jean-Karl Vernay | (Luxembourg) Audi Sport Leopard Lukoil Team WRT |
| Time | 1:26.368 |

Podium
| First | (France) Jean-Karl Vernay | (Luxembourg) Audi Sport Leopard Lukoil Team WRT |
| Second | (Morocco) Mehdi Bennani | (France) Sébastien Loeb Racing |
| Third | (Spain) Pepe Oriola | (Spain) Team Oscaro by Campos Racing |
- Race 3

Pole
| Driver | (Italy) Gabriele Tarquini | (Italy) BRC Racing Team |
- Time 1:24.316

Fastest lap
| Driver | (Italy) Gabriele Tarquini | (Italy) BRC Racing Team |
| Time | 1:26.150 |

Podium
| First | (Italy) Gabriele Tarquini | (Italy) BRC Racing Team |
| Second | (France) Yvan Muller | (France) M Racing-YMR |
| Third | (Sweden) Thed Björk | (France) M Racing-YMR |

The 2018 FIA WTCR Afriquia Race of Morocco was the opening round of the 2018 World Touring Car Cup and the first running of the FIA WTCR Race of Morocco. It was held on 7th and 8th of April 2018 at the Circuit International Automobile Moulay El Hassan in Marrakesh, Morocco. The first and third races were won by Gabriele Tarquini and the second won by Jean-Karl Vernay.

== Entry list ==
A total of 25 cars were entered. The following teams and drivers were entered into the event:

| Team | Car | No. | Drivers |
|---|---|---|---|
| (Italy) BRC Racing Team | Hyundai i30 N TCR | 5 | (Hungary) Norbert Michelisz |
| (Belgium) DG Sport Compétition | Peugeot 308 GTi TCR | 7 | (France) Aurélien Comte |
| (Hungary) Zengő Motorsport | CUPRA León TCR | 8 | (Hungary) Norbert Nagy |
| (Belgium) Boutsen Ginion Racing | Honda Civic Type R TCR (FK8) | 9 | (Netherlands) Tom Coronel |
| (Italy) Team Mulsanne | Alfa Romeo Giulietta TCR | 10 | (Italy) Gianni Morbidelli |
| (France) M Racing-YMR | Hyundai i30 N TCR | 11 | (Sweden) Thed Björk |
| (France) Sébastien Loeb Racing | Volkswagen Golf GTI TCR | 12 | (United Kingdom) Robert Huff |
| (Germany) ALL-INKL.COM Münnich Motorsport | Honda Civic Type R TCR (FK8) | 15 | (United Kingdom) James Thompson |
| (Belgium) Audi Sport Team Comtoyou | Audi RS 3 LMS TCR | 20 | (Belgium) Denis Dupont |
| (Belgium) Comtoyou Racing | Audi RS 3 LMS TCR | 21 | (France) Aurélien Panis |
| (Belgium) Audi Sport Team Comtoyou | Audi RS 3 LMS TCR | 22 | (Belgium) Frédéric Vervisch |
| (Belgium) Comtoyou Racing | Audi RS 3 LMS TCR | 23 | (France) Nathanaël Berthon |
| (France) Sébastien Loeb Racing | Volkswagen Golf GTI TCR | 25 | (Morocco) Mehdi Bennani |
| (Spain) Team Oscaro by Campos Racing | CUPRA León TCR | 27 | (France) John Filippi |
| (Italy) BRC Racing Team | Hyundai i30 N TCR | 30 | (Italy) Gabriele Tarquini |
| (France) M Racing-YMR | Hyundai i30 N TCR | 48 | (France) Yvan Muller |
| (Luxembourg) Audi Sport Leopard Lukoil Team WRT | Audi RS 3 LMS TCR | 52 | (United Kingdom) Gordon Shedden |
| (Belgium) Boutsen Ginion Racing | Honda Civic Type R TCR (FK8) | 63 | (Belgium) Benjamin Lessennes |
| (Hungary) Zengő Motorsport | CUPRA León TCR | 66 | (Hungary) Zsolt Szabó |
| (Germany) ALL-INKL.COM Münnich Motorsport | Honda Civic Type R TCR (FK8) | 68 | (France) Yann Ehrlacher |
| (Luxembourg) Audi Sport Leopard Lukoil Team WRT | Audi RS 3 LMS TCR | 69 | (France) Jean-Karl Vernay |
| (Belgium) DG Sport Compétition | Peugeot 308 GTi TCR | 70 | (Slovakia) Mat'o Homola |
| (Spain) Team Oscaro by Campos Racing | CUPRA León TCR | 74 | (Spain) Pepe Oriola |
| (Germany) ALL-INKL.COM Münnich Motorsport | Honda Civic Type R TCR (FK8) | 86 | (Argentina) Esteban Guerrieri |
| (Italy) Team Mulsanne | Alfa Romeo Giulietta TCR | 88 | (Italy) Fabrizio Giovanardi |

== Results ==
=== Qualifying 1 ===
| Pos. | No. | Name | Team | Car | Time |
|---|---|---|---|---|---|
| 1 | 11 | (Sweden) Thed Björk | M Racing-YMR | Hyundai i30 N TCR | 1:24.698 |
| 2 | 30 | (Italy) Gabriele Tarquini | BRC Racing Team | Hyundai i30 N TCR | 1:25.059 |
| 3 | 69 | (France) Jean-Karl Vernay | Audi Sport Leopard Lukoil Team WRT | Audi RS 3 LMS TCR | 1:25.256 |
| 4 | 12 | (United Kingdom) Robert Huff | Sébastien Loeb Racing | Volkswagen Golf GTI TCR | 1:25.294 |
| 5 | 27 | (France) John Filippi | Team Oscaro by Campos Racing | CUPRA León TCR | 1:25.405 |
| 6 | 86 | (Argentina) Esteban Guerrieri | ALL-INKL.COM Münnich Motorsport | Honda Civic Type R TCR (FK8) | 1:25.530 |
| 7 | 52 | (United Kingdom) Gordon Shedden | Audi Sport Leopard Lukoil Team WRT | Audi RS 3 LMS TCR | 1:25.577 |
| 8 | 25 | (Morocco) Mehdi Bennani | Sébastien Loeb Racing | Volkswagen Golf GTI TCR | 1:25.658 |
| 9 | 48 | (France) Yvan Muller | M Racing-YMR | Hyundai i30 N TCR | 1:25.679 |
| 10 | 15 | (United Kingdom) James Thompson | ALL-INKL.COM Münnich Motorsport | Honda Civic Type R TCR (FK8) | 1:25.729 |
| 11 | 7 | (France) Aurélien Comte | DG Sport Compétition | Peugeot 308 GTi TCR | 1:25.868 |
| 12 | 15 | (France) Yann Ehrlacher | ALL-INKL.COM Münnich Motorsport | Honda Civic Type R TCR (FK8) | 1:25.917 |
| 13 | 22 | (Belgium) Frédéric Vervisch | Audi Sport Team Comtoyou | Audi RS 3 LMS TCR | 1:25.946 |
| 14 | 74 | (Spain) Pepe Oriola | Team Oscaro by Campos Racing | CUPRA León TCR | 1:25.947 |
| 15 | 23 | (France) Nathanaël Berthon | Comtoyou Racing | Audi RS 3 LMS TCR | 1:26.032 |
| 16 | 9 | (Netherlands) Tom Coronel | Boutsen Ginion Racing | Honda Civic Type R TCR (FK8) | 1:26.105 |
| 17 | 21 | (France) Aurélien Panis | Comtoyou Racing | Audi RS 3 LMS TCR | 1:26.256 |
| 18 | 70 | (Slovakia) Mat'o Homola | DG Sport Compétition | Peugeot 308 GTi TCR | 1:26.371 |
| 19 | 20 | (Belgium) Denis Dupont | Audi Sport Team Comtoyou | Audi RS 3 LMS TCR | 1:26.379 |
| 20 | 88 | (Italy) Fabrizio Giovanardi | Team Mulsanne | Alfa Romeo Giulietta TCR | 1:26.384 |
| 21 | 66 | (Hungary) Zsolt Szabó | Zengő Motorsport | CUPRA León TCR | 1:26.473 |
| 22 | 8 | (Hungary) Norbert Nagy | Zengő Motorsport | CUPRA León TCR | 1:26.708 |
| 23 | 63 | (Belgium) Benjamin Lessennes | Boutsen Ginion Racing | Honda Civic Type R TCR (FK8) | 1:27.065 |
| 24 | 10 | (Italy) Gianni Morbidelli | Team Mulsanne | Alfa Romeo Giulietta TCR | 1:27.388 |
| 25 | 5 | (Hungary) Norbert Michelisz | BRC Racing Team | Hyundai i30 N TCR | 1:24.834 |

- Norbert Michelisz was given a grid penalty for an engine change after qualifying and moved to the back of the grid after qualifying second fastest.

=== Race 1 ===
| Pos. | No. | Name | Team | Car | Laps | Time/Retired | Grid | Points |
|---|---|---|---|---|---|---|---|---|
| 1 | 30 | (Italy) Gabriele Tarquini | BRC Racing Team | Hyundai i30 N TCR | 20 | 48:58.707 | 2 | 27 |
| 2 | 11 | (Sweden) Thed Björk | M Racing-YMR | Hyundai i30 N TCR | 20 | +0.499 | 1 | 20 |
| 3 | 12 | (United Kingdom) Robert Huff | Sébastien Loeb Racing | Volkswagen Golf GTI TCR | 20 | +2.823 | 4 | 17 |
| 4 | 69 | (France) Jean-Karl Vernay | Audi Sport Leopard Lukoil Team WRT | Audi RS 3 LMS TCR | 20 | +4.593 | 3 | 14 |
| 5 | 52 | (United Kingdom) Gordon Shedden | Audi Sport Leopard Lukoil Team WRT | Audi RS 3 LMS TCR | 20 | +5.702 | 7 | 12 |
| 6 | 86 | (Argentina) Esteban Guerrieri | ALL-INKL.COM Münnich Motorsport | Honda Civic Type R TCR (FK8) | 20 | +10.136 | 6 | 10 |
| 7 | 68 | (France) Yann Ehrlacher | ALL-INKL.COM Münnich Motorsport | Honda Civic Type R TCR (FK8) | 20 | +10.784 | 12 | 8 |
| 8 | 7 | (France) Aurélien Comte | DG Sport Compétition | Peugeot 308 GTi TCR | 20 | +11.577 | 11 | 6 |
| 9 | 25 | (Morocco) Mehdi Bennani | Sébastien Loeb Racing | Volkswagen Golf GTI TCR | 20 | +15.025 | 8 | 4 |
| 10 | 27 | (France) John Filippi | Team Oscaro by Campos Racing | CUPRA León TCR | 20 | +15.026 | 5 | 2 |
| 11 | 48 | (France) Yvan Muller | M Racing-YMR | Hyundai i30 N TCR | 20 | +16.556 | 9 | |
| 12 | 23 | (France) Nathanaël Berthon | Comtoyou Racing | Audi RS 3 LMS TCR | 20 | +17.046 | 15 | |
| 13 | 20 | (Belgium) Denis Dupont | Audi Sport Team Comtoyou | Audi RS 3 LMS TCR | 20 | +18.039 | 19 | |
| 14 | 15 | (United Kingdom) James Thompson | ALL-INKL.COM Münnich Motorsport | Honda Civic Type R TCR (FK8) | 20 | +18.537 | 10 | |
| 15 | 63 | (Belgium) Benjamin Lessennes | Boutsen Ginion Racing | Honda Civic Type R TCR (FK8) | 20 | +22.213 | 23 | |
| 16 | 8 | (Hungary) Norbert Nagy | Zengő Motorsport | CUPRA León TCR | 20 | +25.096 | 22 | |
| 17 | 66 | (Hungary) Zsolt Szabó | Zengő Motorsport | CUPRA León TCR | 20 | +53.666 | 21 | |
| 18 | 74 | (Spain) Pepe Oriola | Team Oscaro by Campos Racing | CUPRA León TCR | 19 | +1 Lap | 14 | |
| 19 | 88 | (Italy) Fabrizio Giovanardi | Team Mulsanne | Alfa Romeo Giulietta TCR | 19 | +1 Lap | 20 | |
| 20 | 10 | (Italy) Gianni Morbidelli | Team Mulsanne | Alfa Romeo Giulietta TCR | 17 | +3 Laps | 24 | |
| 21 | 9 | (Netherlands) Tom Coronel | Boutsen Ginion Racing | Honda Civic Type R TCR (FK8) | 15 | +5 Laps | 16 | |
| Ret | 70 | (Slovakia) Mat'o Homola | DG Sport Compétition | Peugeot 308 GTi TCR | 11 | Damage | 18 | |
| Ret | 5 | (Hungary) Norbert Michelisz | BRC Racing Team | Hyundai i30 N TCR | 3 | Wheel | 25 | |
| Ret | 21 | (France) Aurélien Panis | Comtoyou Racing | Audi RS 3 LMS TCR | 1 | Crash | 17 | |
| Ret | 22 | (Belgium) Frédéric Vervisch | Audi Sport Team Comtoyou | Audi RS 3 LMS TCR | 0 | Crash | 13 | |

- Mehdi Bennani originally finished fifth but was given a 10-second time penalty for contact with Esteban Guerrieri.

=== Qualifying 2 ===
| Pos. | No. | Name | Team | Car | Q1 | Q2 | Q3 | Points |
|---|---|---|---|---|---|---|---|---|
| 1 | 30 | (Italy) Gabriele Tarquini | BRC Racing Team | Hyundai i30 N TCR | 1:24.816 | 1:24.442 | 1:24.316 | 5 |
| 2 | 48 | (France) Yvan Muller | M Racing-YMR | Hyundai i30 N TCR | 1:24.734 | 1:24.658 | 1:24.396 | 4 |
| 3 | 5 | (Hungary) Norbert Michelisz | BRC Racing Team | Hyundai i30 N TCR | 1:24.863 | 1:24.519 | 1:24.540 | 3 |
| 4 | 11 | (Sweden) Thed Björk | M Racing-YMR | Hyundai i30 N TCR | 1:24.796 | 1:24.392 | 1:24.653 | 2 |
| 5 | 68 | (France) Yann Ehrlacher | ALL-INKL.COM Münnich Motorsport | Honda Civic Type R TCR (FK8) | 1:24.796 | 1:24.392 | 1:24.653 | 1 |
| 6 | 12 | (United Kingdom) Robert Huff | Sébastien Loeb Racing | Volkswagen Golf GTI TCR | 1:24.877 | 1:24.743 | – | |
| 7 | 25 | (Morocco) Mehdi Bennani | Sébastien Loeb Racing | Volkswagen Golf GTI TCR | 1:25.082 | 1:24.789 | – | |
| 8 | 15 | (United Kingdom) James Thompson | ALL-INKL.COM Münnich Motorsport | Honda Civic Type R TCR (FK8) | 1:25.302 | 1:24.807 | – | |
| 9 | 69 | (France) Jean-Karl Vernay | Audi Sport Leopard Lukoil Team WRT | Audi RS 3 LMS TCR | 1:25.080 | 1:24.910 | – | |
| 10 | 74 | (Spain) Pepe Oriola | Team Oscaro by Campos Racing | CUPRA León TCR | 1:25.320 | 1:25.067 | – | |
| 11 | 52 | (United Kingdom) Gordon Shedden | Audi Sport Leopard Lukoil Team WRT | Audi RS 3 LMS TCR | 1:25.339 | 1:25.151 | – | |
| 12 | 22 | (Belgium) Frédéric Vervisch | Audi Sport Team Comtoyou | Audi RS 3 LMS TCR | 1:25.301 | 1:25.201 | – | |
| 13 | 86 | (Argentina) Esteban Guerrieri | ALL-INKL.COM Münnich Motorsport | Honda Civic Type R TCR (FK8) | 1:25.361 | – | – | |
| 14 | 9 | (Netherlands) Tom Coronel | Boutsen Ginion Racing | Honda Civic Type R TCR (FK8) | 1:25.407 | – | – | |
| 15 | 27 | (France) John Filippi | Team Oscaro by Campos Racing | CUPRA León TCR | 1:25.420 | – | – | |
| 16 | 70 | (Slovakia) Mat'o Homola | DG Sport Compétition | Peugeot 308 GTi TCR | 1:25.423 | – | – | |
| 17 | 63 | (Belgium) Benjamin Lessennes | Boutsen Ginion Racing | Honda Civic Type R TCR (FK8) | 1:25.459 | – | – | |
| 18 | 7 | (France) Aurélien Comte | DG Sport Compétition | Peugeot 308 GTi TCR | 1:25.531 | – | – | |
| 19 | 66 | (Hungary) Zsolt Szabó | Zengő Motorsport | CUPRA León TCR | 1:25.762 | – | – | |
| 20 | 23 | (France) Nathanaël Berthon | Comtoyou Racing | Audi RS 3 LMS TCR | 1:25.828 | – | – | |
| 21 | 20 | (Belgium) Denis Dupont | Audi Sport Team Comtoyou | Audi RS 3 LMS TCR | 1:25.906 | – | – | |
| 22 | 8 | (Hungary) Norbert Nagy | Zengő Motorsport | CUPRA León TCR | 1:26.002 | – | – | |
| 23 | 88 | (Italy) Fabrizio Giovanardi | Team Mulsanne | Alfa Romeo Giulietta TCR | 1:26.064 | – | – | |
| 24 | 21 | (France) Aurélien Panis | Comtoyou Racing | Audi RS 3 LMS TCR | 1:26.409 | – | – | |
| 25 | 10 | (Italy) Gianni Morbidelli | Team Mulsanne | Alfa Romeo Giulietta TCR | 1:26.708 | – | – | |

=== Race 2 ===
| Pos. | No. | Name | Team | Car | Laps | Time/Retired | Grid | Points |
|---|---|---|---|---|---|---|---|---|
| 1 | 69 | (France) Jean-Karl Vernay | Audi Sport Leopard Lukoil Team WRT | Audi RS 3 LMS TCR | 20 | 31:41.418 | 2 | 25 |
| 2 | 25 | (Morocco) Mehdi Bennani | Sébastien Loeb Racing | Volkswagen Golf GTI TCR | 20 | +0.890 | 4 | 18 |
| 3 | 74 | (Spain) Pepe Oriola | Team Oscaro by Campos Racing | CUPRA León TCR | 20 | +3.270 | 1 | 15 |
| 4 | 68 | (France) Yann Ehrlacher | ALL-INKL.COM Münnich Motorsport | Honda Civic Type R TCR (FK8) | 20 | +3.631 | 6 | 12 |
| 5 | 11 | (Sweden) Thed Björk | M Racing-YMR | Hyundai i30 N TCR | 20 | +6.570 | 7 | 10 |
| 6 | 15 | (United Kingdom) James Thompson | ALL-INKL.COM Münnich Motorsport | Honda Civic Type R TCR (FK8) | 20 | +7.916 | 3 | 8 |
| 7 | 5 | (Hungary) Norbert Michelisz | BRC Racing Team | Hyundai i30 N TCR | 20 | +11.929 | 8 | 6 |
| 8 | 86 | (Argentina) Esteban Guerrieri | ALL-INKL.COM Münnich Motorsport | Honda Civic Type R TCR (FK8) | 20 | +13.630 | 13 | 4 |
| 9 | 48 | (France) Yvan Muller | M Racing-YMR | Hyundai i30 N TCR | 20 | +14.555 | 9 | 2 |
| 10 | 9 | (Netherlands) Tom Coronel | Boutsen Ginion Racing | Honda Civic Type R TCR (FK8) | 20 | +14.959 | 14 | 1' |
| 11 | 52 | (United Kingdom) Gordon Shedden | Audi Sport Leopard Lukoil Team WRT | Audi RS 3 LMS TCR | 20 | +15.386 | 11 | |
| 12 | 70 | (Slovakia) Mat'o Homola | DG Sport Compétition | Peugeot 308 GTi TCR | 20 | +19.480 | 18 | |
| 13 | 88 | (Italy) Fabrizio Giovanardi | Team Mulsanne | Alfa Romeo Giulietta TCR | 20 | +20.091 | 23 | |
| 14 | 21 | (France) Aurélien Panis | Comtoyou Racing | Audi RS 3 LMS TCR | 20 | +21.327 | 24 | |
| 15 | 23 | (France) Nathanaël Berthon | Comtoyou Racing | Audi RS 3 LMS TCR | 20 | +22.411 | 20 | |
| 16 | 8 | (Hungary) Norbert Nagy | Zengő Motorsport | CUPRA León TCR | 20 | +24.790 | 22 | |
| 17 | 27 | (France) John Filippi | Team Oscaro by Campos Racing | CUPRA León TCR | 20 | +48.169 | 15 | |
| 18 | 12 | (United Kingdom) Robert Huff | Sébastien Loeb Racing | Volkswagen Golf GTI TCR | 17 | +3 Laps | 5 | |
| 19 | 30 | (Italy) Gabriele Tarquini | BRC Racing Team | Hyundai i30 N TCR | 16 | +4 Laps | 10 | |
| Ret | 7 | (France) Aurélien Comte | DG Sport Compétition | Peugeot 308 GTi TCR | 11 | Retired | 18 | |
| Ret | 63 | (Belgium) Benjamin Lessennes | Boutsen Ginion Racing | Honda Civic Type R TCR (FK8) | 10 | Crash | 17 | |
| Ret | 22 | (Belgium) Frédéric Vervisch | Audi Sport Team Comtoyou | Audi RS 3 LMS TCR | 9 | Retired | 12 | |
| Ret | 10 | (Italy) Gianni Morbidelli | Team Mulsanne | Alfa Romeo Giulietta TCR | 9 | Contact | 25 | |
| Ret | 66 | (Hungary) Zsolt Szabó | Zengő Motorsport | CUPRA León TCR | 7 | Crash | 19 | |
| DNS | 20 | (Belgium) Denis Dupont | Audi Sport Team Comtoyou | Audi RS 3 LMS TCR | – | Qualifying crash | – | |

- John Filippi originally finished twelfth but was given a 30-second time penalty for contact with Benjamin Lessennes.

=== Race 3 ===
| Pos. | No. | Name | Team | Car | Laps | Time/Retired | Grid | Points |
|---|---|---|---|---|---|---|---|---|
| 1 | 30 | (Italy) Gabriele Tarquini | BRC Racing Team | Hyundai i30 N TCR | 23 | 35:32.310 | 1 | 30 |
| 2 | 48 | (France) Yvan Muller | M Racing-YMR | Hyundai i30 N TCR | 23 | +2.524 | 2 | 23 |
| 3 | 11 | (Sweden) Thed Björk | M Racing-YMR | Hyundai i30 N TCR | 23 | +2.922 | 4 | 19 |
| 4 | 68 | (France) Yann Ehrlacher | ALL-INKL.COM Münnich Motorsport | Honda Civic Type R TCR (FK8) | 23 | +4.645 | 6 | 16 |
| 5 | 5 | (Hungary) Norbert Michelisz | BRC Racing Team | Hyundai i30 N TCR | 23 | +5.937 | 3 | 13 |
| 6 | 25 | (Morocco) Mehdi Bennani | Sébastien Loeb Racing | Volkswagen Golf GTI TCR | 23 | +6.631 | 7 | 10 |
| 7 | 12 | (United Kingdom) Robert Huff | Sébastien Loeb Racing | Volkswagen Golf GTI TCR | 23 | +8.121 | 6 | 8 |
| 8 | 15 | (United Kingdom) James Thompson | ALL-INKL.COM Münnich Motorsport | Honda Civic Type R TCR (FK8) | 23 | +9.932 | 8 | 4 |
| 9 | 69 | (France) Jean-Karl Vernay | Audi Sport Leopard Lukoil Team WRT | Audi RS 3 LMS TCR | 23 | +10.743 | 9 | 2 |
| 10 | 74 | (Spain) Pepe Oriola | Team Oscaro by Campos Racing | CUPRA León TCR | 23 | +13.740 | 10 | 1 |
| 11 | 27 | (France) John Filippi | Team Oscaro by Campos Racing | CUPRA León TCR | 23 | +14.599 | 15 | |
| 12 | 9 | (Netherlands) Tom Coronel | Boutsen Ginion Racing | Honda Civic Type R TCR (FK8) | 23 | +14.838 | 14 | |
| 13 | 70 | (Slovakia) Mat'o Homola | DG Sport Compétition | Peugeot 308 GTi TCR | 23 | +16.011 | 16 | |
| 14 | 86 | (Argentina) Esteban Guerrieri | ALL-INKL.COM Münnich Motorsport | Honda Civic Type R TCR (FK8) | 23 | +16.475 | 13 | |
| 15 | 8 | (Hungary) Norbert Nagy | Zengő Motorsport | CUPRA León TCR | 23 | +18.464 | 22 | |
| 16 | 21 | (France) Aurélien Panis | Comtoyou Racing | Audi RS 3 LMS TCR | 23 | +19.526 | 24 | |
| 17 | 63 | (Belgium) Benjamin Lessennes | Boutsen Ginion Racing | Honda Civic Type R TCR (FK8) | 23 | +20.205 | 17 | |
| 18 | 52 | (United Kingdom) Gordon Shedden | Audi Sport Leopard Lukoil Team WRT | Audi RS 3 LMS TCR | 19 | +4 Laps | 11 | |
| 19 | 88 | (Italy) Fabrizio Giovanardi | Team Mulsanne | Alfa Romeo Giulietta TCR | 17 | +6 Laps | 23 | |
| Ret | 23 | (France) Nathanaël Berthon | Comtoyou Racing | Audi RS 3 LMS TCR | 15 | Damage | 20 | |
| Ret | 10 | (Italy) Gianni Morbidelli | Team Mulsanne | Alfa Romeo Giulietta TCR | 13 | Retired | 25 | |
| Ret | 66 | (Hungary) Zsolt Szabó | Zengő Motorsport | CUPRA León TCR | 8 | Retired | 19 | |
| Ret | 22 | (Belgium) Frédéric Vervisch | Audi Sport Team Comtoyou | Audi RS 3 LMS TCR | 6 | Retired | 12 | |
| DNS | 7 | (France) Aurélien Comte | DG Sport Compétition | Peugeot 308 GTi TCR | – | Did not start | – | |
| DNS | 20 | (Belgium) Denis Dupont | Audi Sport Team Comtoyou | Audi RS 3 LMS TCR | – | Qualifying crash | – | |

== Standings after the round ==
Drivers' Championship standings

| Pos | Driver | Points |
|---|---|---|
| 1 | (Italy) Gabriele Tarquini | 62 |
| 2 | (Sweden) Thed Björk | 51 |
| 3 | (France) Jean-Karl Vernay | 41 |
| 4 | (France) Yann Ehrlacher | 37 |
| 5 | (Morocco) Mehdi Bennani | 32 |

Teams' Championship standings

| Pos | Driver | Points |
|---|---|---|
| 1 | (Italy) BRC Racing Team | 86 |
| 2 | (France) M Racing-YMR | 82 |
| 3 | (Luxembourg) Audi Sport Leopard Lukoil Team WRT | 56 |
| 4 | (France) Sébastien Loeb Racing | 56 |
| 5 | (Germany) ALL-INKL.COM Münnich Motorsport | 53 |
