= Niklas Mackschin =

German racing driver

Niklas Mackschin (born 2 October 1994 in Hanover) is a German racing driver, that has competed in both the European Touring Car Cup and the ADAC Procar series. He is the current ETCC Super 1600 champion, having won first time in 2015.

== Career ==
In 2015, Mackschin became the champion in ETCC Super 1600, in his debut season. In 2016, he made his TCR International Series début.

== Racing record ==
=== Complete TCR International Series results ===
(key) (Races in bold indicate pole position) (Races in italics indicate fastest lap)

Year	Team	Car	1	2	3	4	5	6	7	8	9	10	11	12	13	14	15	16	17	18	19	20	21	22	DC	Points
2016	Liqui Moly Team Engstler	Volkswagen Golf GTI TCR	BHR; 1	BHR; 2	POR; 1	POR; 2	BEL; 1	BEL; 2	ITA; 1	ITA; 2	AUT; 1	AUT; 2	GER; 1; 9	GER; 2; 8	RUS; 1	RUS; 2	THA; 1	THA; 2	SIN; 1	SIN; 2	MYS; 1	MYS; 2	MAC; 1	MAC; 2	22nd	6
