= Gilles Bruckner =

Luxembourgish racing driver (born 1982)

Gilles Bruckner (born 17 June 1982 in Luxembourg City) is a Luxembourgish racing driver, who has most famously competed in the European Touring Car Cup, as well as the ADAC Procar Series. He was the first ETCC Super 1600 champion from outside of Germany, having won the title for the first time in 2014.

== Career ==
In 2014, Bruckner became the champion in ETCC Super 1600, and was the first non-German to win the title since the class was created in 2008.

In 2015, Bruckner attempted to defend the championship, the first successful title defence since that of Kevin Krammes last year. But he was beaten by the rookie Niklas Mackschin by a 45-point margin, being the closest title challenger but Mackschin was unstoppable with 10 wins in 12 races.
