= Kevin Krammes =

German racing driver

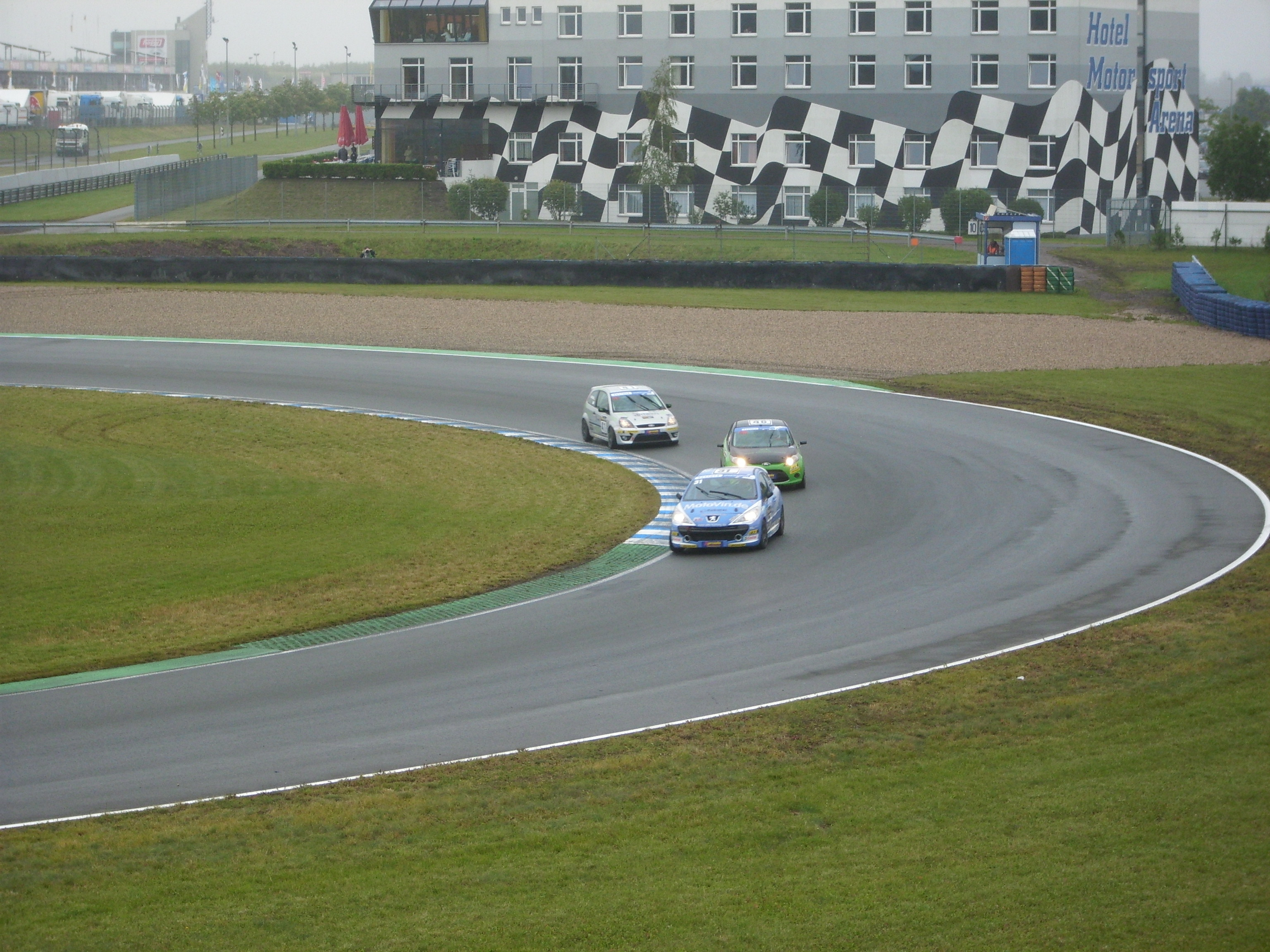

Kevin Krammes (born 10 June 1992 in Eiweiler) is a German racing driver, that has competed in both the European Touring Car Cup and the ADAC Procar series. He is the twice ETCC Super 1600 champion, having won in 2012 and 2013.

== Career ==
In 2012 and 2013 he became the champion in ETCC Super 1600, winning 12 out of 18 races in this division.

In the 2011 ADAC Procar Series season, he was fourth overall in Division 2.
