= Nikolay Karamyshev =

Russian racing driver

- Nationality: (Russia) Russian
- Born: Nikolay Viktorovich Karamyshev; 19 January 1989 (age 37) Kursk, Soviet Union

World Touring Car Championship career
- Debut season: 2013
- Current team: Campos Racing
- Car number: 21
- Starts: 4
- Wins: 0
- Poles: 0
- Fastest laps: 0
- Best finish: NC in 2013

Previous series
- 2008–09,12,14 2007 2007: RTCC; Russian Autocross Championship; Russian Ice Racing Championship

Nikolay Viktorovich Karamyshev (born 19 January 1989 in Kursk) is a Russian auto racing driver who currently competes in the Russian Circuit Racing Series for Kuzma's Mother Racing Team. He has competed in the European Touring Car Cup and will make his debut in the World Touring Car Championship at the 2013 FIA WTCC Race of Russia.

== Racing career ==
=== Racing in Russia ===
Karamyshev started his motorsport career in 2007 in autocross and then continued in rallycross and circuit racing.

Since 2008, Karamyshev drove in Russian Touring Car Championship, and finished the 2010 season in second place in the Super Production category. He missed the 2011 racing season due to a wrist injury. In 2012, he advanced to the top category of RTCC called Touring finishing the season in third place. He then continued his career in european touring car racing. He came back to RCRS for 2016 and 2017. After a long pause, Karamyshev resumed his motorsport career in 2022 winning RCRS championship in a lesser Touring Light category.

In 2015 and 2016, Karamyshev won traditional Russian Race of Stars.

=== World Touring Car Championship ===
Karamyshev joined Campos Racing for the inaugural FIA WTCC Race of Russia in 2013, replacing Hugo Valente in the team in a two race deal for both the Race of Russia and the Race of Portugal.

=== European Touring Car Cup ===
From 2012 to 2014, Karamyshev participated in European Touring Car Cup. In 2012, he was a winner of the Super Production class, and in 2014, he was a champion of the TC2 Turbo class, by winning six of ten races.

== Racing record ==
=== Complete World Touring Car Championship results ===
(key) (Races in bold indicate pole position) (Races in italics indicate fastest lap)

Year	Team	Car	1	2	3	4	5	6	7	8	9	10	11	12	13	14	15	16	17	18	19	20	21	22	23	24	DC	Points
2013	Campos Racing	SEAT León WTCC	ITA; 1	ITA; 2	MAR; 1	MAR; 2	SVK; 1	SVK; 2	HUN; 1	HUN; 2	AUT; 1	AUT; 2	RUS; 1; 21	RUS; 2; 17	POR; 1; 16	POR; 2; 16	ARG; 1	ARG; 2	USA; 1	USA; 2	JPN; 1	JPN; 2	CHN; 1	CHN; 2	MAC; 1	MAC; 2	NC	0
