= Borusan Otomotiv Motorsport =

(Turkey) Borusan Otomotiv Motorsport
- Founded: 2008
- Team principal(s): Ahmet Sabri Köseleci
- Current series: GT4 European Series
- Former series: World Touring Car Championship
- Noted drivers: GT4 European Series (Turkey) Hasan Tansu (Turkey) Yağız Gedik (Turkey) Ibrahim Okyay (Turkey) Cem Bölükbaşı (Turkey) Fatih Ayhan (Turkey) Berkay Besler

Borusan Otomotiv Motorsport is a Turkish auto racing team that has competed in the World Touring Car Championship.

The team was founded in 2008 to compete in the World Touring Car Championship with driver and team principal Ibrahim Okyay. A second car for Aytac Biter was added during the season.

During 2014 season, 17 years old Kaan Önder joined teams European Touring Car Cup roster with the BMW 320si for the TC2 class.

The team is owned by Borusan Otomotiv, the Turkish importer of BMWs and also competes in the Turkish Circuit Championship.
