= Michal Matějovský =

Czech racing driver

- Nationality: Czech
- Born: 20 October 1985 (age 41) Hradec Králové, Czechoslovakia

European Touring Car Cup career
- Debut season: 2007
- Current team: Krenek Motorsport
- Car number: 20
- Best finish: 5th (S2000) in 2013

Previous series
- 2008 2008–10 2007 2004–07: WTCC; SEAT León Eurocup; ADAC Procar Series; Skoda Octavia Cup Czech Republic

Michal Matějovský (born 20 October 1985 in Hradec Králové) is a Czech auto racing driver.

== Career ==
Matějovský's early racing career included the Czech Škoda Matador Pick-up Championship, the Czech Škoda Octavia Cup, and the Czech BMW 1 Challenge. In 2008, he competed in the SEAT León Eurocup, finishing the season sixteenth on points. As a reward for his performance in the Eurocup, he entered one round of the FIA World Touring Car Championship at Brno in 2008. He drove a SEAT León for the SUNRED Racing Development Team, with a best placed finish of twenty-second in race one. He went on to compete in the European Touring Car Cup for O2 Motorsport CSMS in an Alfa Romeo 156.

== Racing record ==
=== Complete World Touring Car Championship results ===
(key) (Races in bold indicate pole position) (Races in italics indicate fastest lap)

Year	Team	Car	1	2	3	4	5	6	7	8	9	10	11	12	13	14	15	16	17	18	19	20	21	22	23	24	DC	Points
2008	SUNRED Racing Development	SEAT León TFSI	BRA; 1	BRA; 2	MEX; 1	MEX; 2	ESP; 1	ESP; 2	FRA; 1	FRA; 2	CZE; 1; 22	CZE; 2 Ret	POR; 1	POR; 2	GBR; 1	GBR; 2	GER; 1	GER; 2	EUR; 1	EUR; 2	ITA; 1	ITA; 2	JPN; 1	JPN; 2	MAC; 1	MAC; 2	NC	0
