= Aytaç Biter =

Turkish racing driver (born 1965)

- Nationality: Turkish
- Born: 5 November 1965 (age 61) Ankara, Turkey

European Touring Car Cup - Super 2000 --> career
- Current team: Borusan Otomotiv Motorsport
- Engine: BMW 320si E90
- Former teams: Team Active
- Starts: 35
- Wins: 2
- Statistics up to date as of September 20, 2013.

Aytaç Biter (born 5 November 1965 in Ankara, Turkey) is a Turkish auto racing driver.

He competed in 2006 for Team Active in Turkish Formula Three Championship's 14 races achieving two wins and eight podiums, and finished the season in second position.

In 2008, Biter raced in the Turkish Touring Car Championship's Super 2000 category driving a BMW 320si for Borusan Otomotiv Motorsport team. He completed twelve races with five podiums and no wins. The same year, he competed in four rounds of the FIA World Touring Car Championship at Brands Hatch and Oschersleben with no success.

He raced in 2010 in four rounds of the FIA European Touring Car Cup and placed 10th with seven points. In the 2012 season of the same championship, he was able to upgrade his rank to 5th earning 25 points. The same year, he placed fourth in the SP3 class of 24 Hours of Barcelona driving a BMW M3.

As of September 2013, Biter ranks 10th in the 2013 ETCC, one round before the end of the season.

== Racing record ==
World Touring Car Championship — Super 2000

| Season | Team | Engine | R5 | | R6 | | R7 | | R8 | | R9 | | R10 | | Pts | Pos |
| Season | Team | Engine | 1 | 2 | 1 | 2 | 1 | 2 | 1 | 2 | 1 | 2 | 1 | 2 | Pts | Pos |
|---|---|---|---|---|---|---|---|---|---|---|---|---|---|---|---|---|
| 2008 | Borusan Otomotiv Motorsport | BMW 320si | Brno | | Estoril | | Brands Hatch | | Oschersleben | | Imola | | Monza | | — | 0 |
| 2008 | Borusan Otomotiv Motorsport | BMW 320si | DNP | DNP | DNP | DNP | 22 | 21 | 23 | 24 | DNP | DNP | DNP | DNP | — | 0 |

World Touring Car Championship-Yokohama Independents' Trophy — Super 2000

| Season | Team | Engine | R5 | | R6 | | R7 | | R8 | | R9 | | R10 | | Pts | Pos |
| Season | Team | Engine | 1 | 2 | 1 | 2 | 1 | 2 | 1 | 2 | 1 | 2 | 1 | 2 | Pts | Pos |
|---|---|---|---|---|---|---|---|---|---|---|---|---|---|---|---|---|
| 2008 | Borusan Otomotiv Motorsport | BMW 320si | Brno | | Estoril | | Brands Hatch | | Oschersleben | | Imola | | Monza | | — | 0 |
| 2008 | Borusan Otomotiv Motorsport | BMW 320si | DNP | DNP | DNP | DNP | 22 | 21 | 23 | 24 | DNP | DNP | DNP | DNP | — | 0 |
