= Super 1600 =

Race car class

Motor racing formula
- Category: Rallying, Rallycross
- Country or region: International
- Championships: Various
- Inaugural season: 2001
- Status: Defunct

Super 1600, also known as S1600, is a rally car formula that was primarily used in the Junior World Rally Championship between 2001 and 2010, as well as international rallycross championships and various national rally championships. Any automobile manufacturer that had a suitable road-going production model in its range could develop a specification for use in this formula. It was devised by the Fédération Internationale de l'Automobile (the international governing body of motorsport) in 2000 and first saw competitive use in 2001. Super 1600 was intended to provide a young driver's entry point into international rallying, and could only be used by entrants in the JWRC in particular at world level. From 2011 the formulae was not accepted in JWRC as Group R cars took prominence.

== Technical details ==
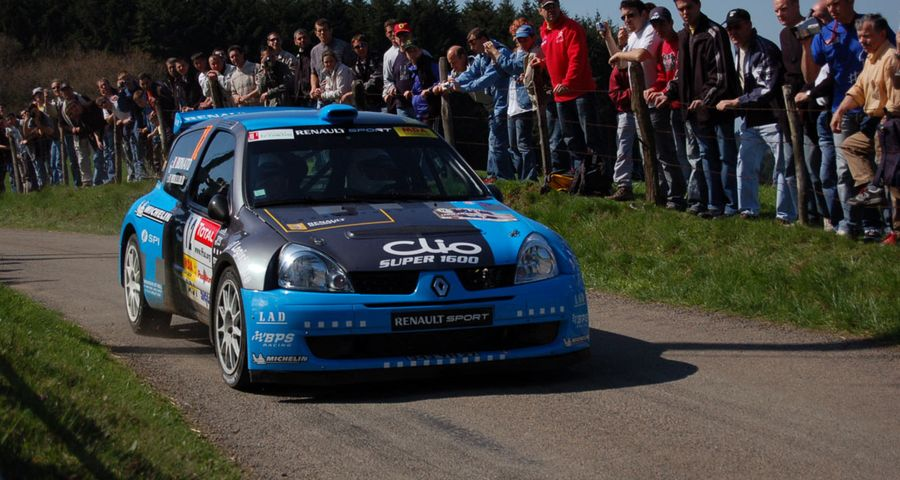
Renault Clio Super 1600

=== Eligibility ===
Most FIA-approved rally car formulae are in some way production-based, from Super 1600 to World Rally car specification. This necessitates a process of homologation in Group A or N, before being modified within the limits of a formula's technical regulations. Such changes may include modified or entirely new parts in the engine, gearbox, suspension, bodywork and so on. In the Super 1600 formula, "suitable" is defined as a passenger car that has one driven axle (two-wheel drive) and a 4-cylinder engine that is of naturally aspirated configuration with a maximum volume of 1640cc. At the time of homologation, the car must currently or have previously been in serial production with a minimum production number of 2500 vehicles.

Though some manufacturers will operate their own motorsport programmes either directly or through a contractor, in many forms of production-based motorsport it is quite common for cars to be developed by independent constructors and specialist teams. In this case manufacturer approval is still required to homologate a new car. The Citroën C2 is an example of in-house development; the Ford Fiesta was developed by a contracted specialist (M-Sport); and the Opel Corsa was developed independently without technical assistance from GM.

=== Modifications ===
The production car's standard gearbox is replaced by a sequential manual gearbox with a maximum of six forward ratios. The engine may be modified to produce a maximum power output of 230hp and the exhaust is subject to a noise restriction of 100dB at 4500rpm.

As with the World Rally Car specification, Super 1600 requires a production-standard bodyshell that is made safe for competition with the addition of a roll cage. Certain other modifications can be made to increase the width of the bodywork and improve its aerodynamic efficiency. The weight of the competition car is reduced to a minimum of 980kg, with a lower minimum weight of 920 kg if an engine with only two valves per cylinder is employed. In most cases, this is approximately 50 to 100 kg less than the weight of the production car version; the 1.6L Citroën C2, for example, weighs 1084 kg.

== Homologations ==
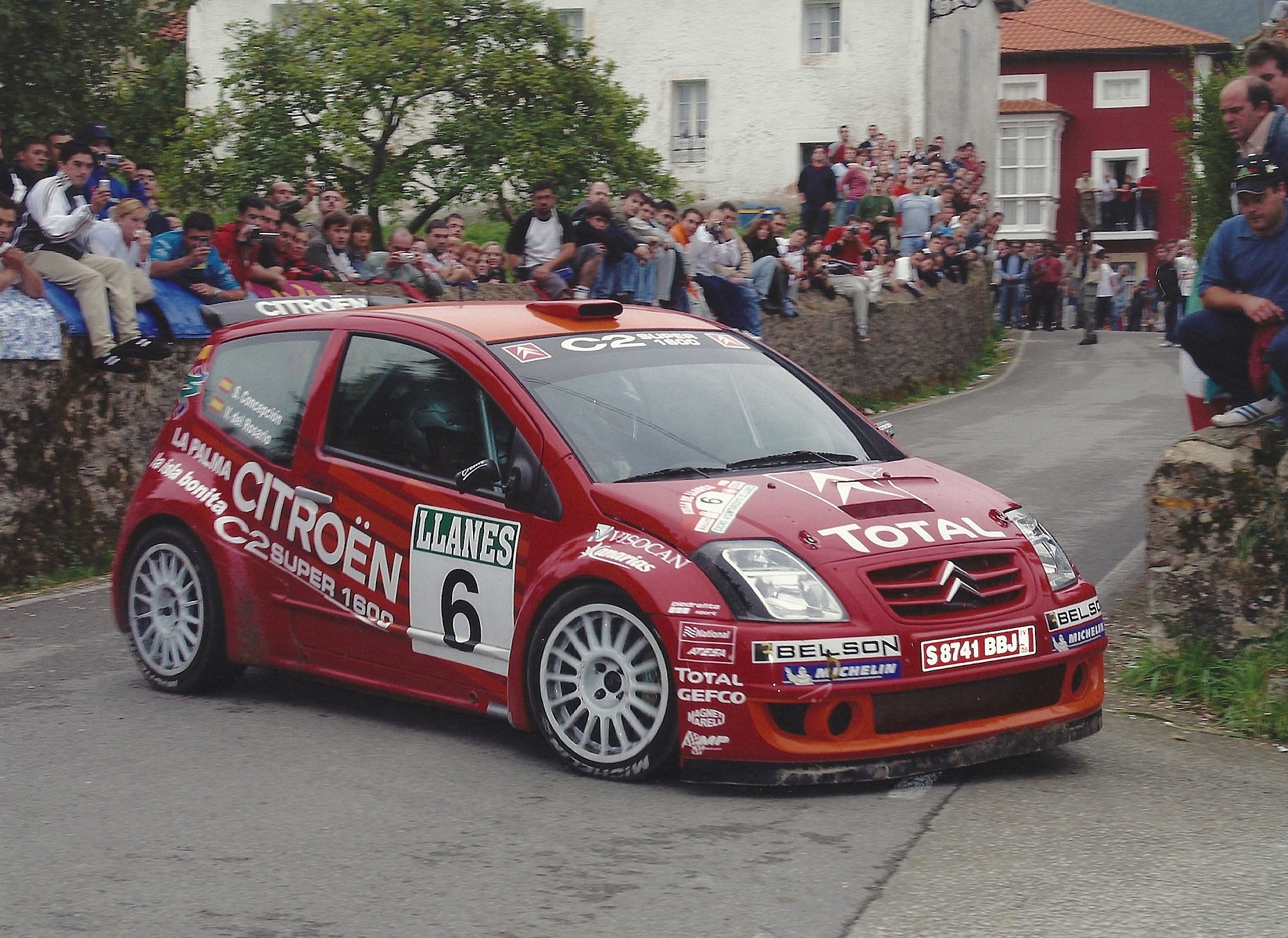
Citroën C2 Super 1600

The following table shows the most notable S1600 cars that have competed at international level:

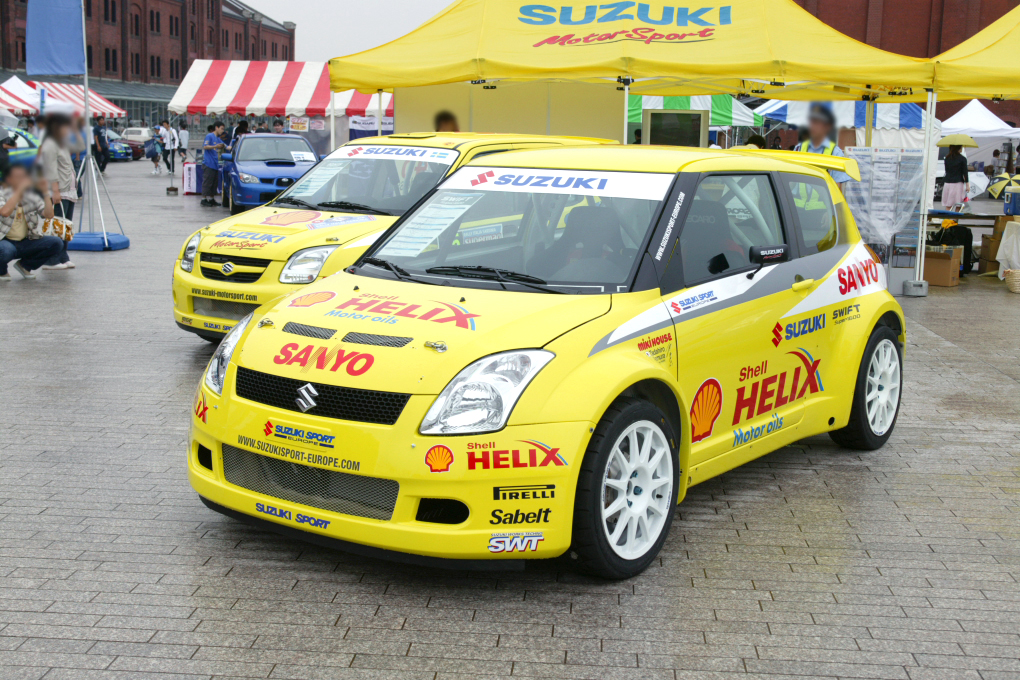
Suzuki Swift Super 1600 '05

Make	Model	JWRC wins
Citroën	C2	22
Suzuki	Swift	15
Citroën	Saxo	10
Renault	Clio	10
Suzuki	Ignis	9
Fiat	Punto	3
Ford	Puma	1
Volkswagen	Polo	1
MG	ZR	0

== See also ==
- Super 2000, a specification and classification for production based race cars
- Group N, a set of regulations in motorsport for production vehicles
