= 2017 TCR International Series Spa-Francorchamps round =

(Belgium) 2017 TCR International Series Spa-Francorchamps round
Round details
- Round 3 of 10 rounds in the 2017 TCR International Series
- Layout of the Circuit de Spa-Francorchamps
- Location: Circuit de Spa-Francorchamps, Francorchamps, Belgium
- Course: Permanent racing facility 7.004 km (4.352 mi)

TCR International Series

Race 1
- Date: 5 May 2017
- Laps: 9

Pole position
Driver	(Switzerland) Stefano Comini	Comtoyou Racing
- Time: 2:30.794

Podium
First	(Switzerland) Stefano Comini	Comtoyou Racing
Second	(Belgium) Benjamin Lessennes	Boutsen Ginion Racing
Third	(Hungary) Attila Tassi	M1RA

Fastest lap
Driver	(Switzerland) Stefano Comini	Comtoyou Racing
- Time: 2:32.101 (on lap 3)

Race 2
- Date: 6 May 2017
- Laps: 9

Podium
First	(France) Jean-Karl Vernay	Leopard Racing Team WRT
Second	(United Kingdom) Robert Huff	Leopard Racing Team WRT
Third	(Switzerland) Stefano Comini	Comtoyou Racing

Fastest lap
Driver	(Switzerland) Stefano Comini	Comtoyou Racing
- Time: 2:32.593 (on lap 3)

The 2017 TCR International Series Spa-Francorchamps round was the third round of the 2017 TCR International Series season. It took place on 5–6 May at the Circuit de Spa-Francorchamps.

Stefano Comini won the first race starting from pole position, driving an Audi RS3 LMS TCR, and Jean-Karl Vernay gained the second one, driving a Volkswagen Golf GTI TCR.

== Ballast ==
Due to the results obtained in the previous round, Roberto Colciago and Dušan Borković both received +30 kg, while Hugo Valente received +10 kg.

The Balance of Performance was also adjusted for this event, meaning the Alfa Romeo Giulietta TCRs was deprived of its -20 kg weight break, it will therefore run its minimum weight of 1285 kg. The Opel Astra TCRs was also given a weight break, going down from +40 kg to +20 kg.

== Classification ==
=== Qualifying ===
Pos.	No.	Driver	Car	Team	Q1	Q2	Grid	Points
1	1	(Switzerland) Stefano Comini	Audi RS3 LMS TCR	(Belgium) Comtoyou Racing	2:31.344	2:30.794	1	5
2	6	(Belgium) Frédéric Vervisch	Audi RS3 LMS TCR	(Belgium) Comtoyou Racing	2:31.594	2:30.861	2	4
3	63	(Belgium) Benjamin Lessennes	Honda Civic Type-R TCR	(Belgium) Boutsen Ginion Racing	2:31.850	2:31.038	3	3
4	2	(France) Jean-Karl Vernay	Volkswagen Golf GTI TCR	(Luxembourg) Leopard Racing Team WRT	2:31.880	2:31.130	4	2
5	3	(United Kingdom) Robert Huff	Volkswagen Golf GTI TCR	(Luxembourg) Leopard Racing Team WRT	2:31.515	2:31.399	5	1
6	9	(Hungary) Attila Tassi	Honda Civic Type-R TCR	(Hungary) M1RA	2:31:912	2:31.762	6	
7	64	(Netherlands) Tom Coronel	Honda Civic Type-R TCR	(Belgium) Boutsen Ginion Racing	2:31.499	2:32.829	7	
8	25	(Belgium) Edouard Mondron	Volkswagen Golf GTI TCR	(Belgium) Delahaye Racing	2:31.960	2:32.924	8	
9	74	(Spain) Pepe Oriola	SEAT León TCR	(Hong Kong) Lukoil Craft-Bamboo Racing	2:32.011	2:33.214	9	
10	35	(Belgium) Maxime Potty	Volkswagen Golf GTI TCR	(Belgium) Michaël Mazuin Sport	2:31.949	2:41.807	10	
11	16	(Georgia (country)) Davit Kajaia	Alfa Romeo Giulietta TCR	(Georgia (country)) GE-Force	2:32.388	No time^{2}	24^{1}	
12	55	(Hungary) Ferenc Ficza	SEAT León TCR	(Hungary) Zengő Motorsport	2:31.205	No time	11	
13	10	(Italy) Gianni Morbidelli	Volkswagen Golf GTI TCR	(Sweden) WestCoast Racing	2:32.423		12	
14	21	(Italy) Giacomo Altoè	Volkswagen Golf GTI TCR	(Sweden) WestCoast Racing	2:32.752		13	
15	23	(Belgium) Pierre-Yves Corthals	Opel Astra TCR	(Belgium) DG Sport Compétition	2:32.766^{2}		14	
16	54	(United Kingdom) James Nash	SEAT León TCR	(Hong Kong) Lukoil Craft-Bamboo Racing	2:32.812		15	
17	70	(Slovakia) Maťo Homola	Opel Astra TCR	(Belgium) DG Sport Compétition	2:32.908^{2}		16	
18	5	(Italy) Roberto Colciago	Honda Civic Type-R TCR	(Hungary) M1RA	2:32.940		17	
19	62	(Serbia) Dušan Borković	Alfa Romeo Giulietta TCR	(Georgia (country)) GE-Force	2:32.946		18	
20	34	(Norway) Stian Paulsen	SEAT León TCR	(Norway) Stian Paulsen Racing	2:33.824		19	
21	11	(Denmark) Jens Reno Møller	Honda Civic Type-R TCR	(Denmark) Reno Racing	2:35.611		20	
22	12	(Belgium) Guillaume Mondron	SEAT León TCR	(Belgium) Delahaye Racing	2:36.157		21	
23	7	(France) Hugo Valente	SEAT León TCR	(Hong Kong) Lukoil Craft-Bamboo Racing	2:36.702		22	
24	18	(United States) Duncan Ende	SEAT León TCR	(United States) Icarus Motorsports	2:37.125		23	

Notes

- ^1 — Davit Kajaia was sent to the back of the grid for Race 1, after an engine change.
- ^2 — Maťo Homola, Pierre-Yves Corthals and Davit Kajaia had their best laptimes deleted during Q1 and Q2, for not respecting the track limits.

=== Race 1 ===
Pos.	No.	Driver	Car	Team	Laps	Time/Retired	Grid	Points
1	1	(Switzerland) Stefano Comini	Audi RS3 LMS TCR	(Belgium) Comtoyou Racing	9	23:07.903	1	25
2	63	(Belgium) Benjamin Lessennes	Honda Civic Type-R TCR	(Belgium) Boutsen Ginion Racing	9	+3.547	3	18
3	9	(Hungary) Attila Tassi	Honda Civic Type-R TCR	(Hungary) M1RA	9	+8.343	6	15
4	2	(France) Jean-Karl Vernay	Volkswagen Golf GTI TCR	(Luxembourg) Leopard Racing Team WRT	9	+8.764	4	12
5	6	(Belgium) Frédéric Vervisch	Audi RS3 LMS TCR	(Belgium) Comtoyou Racing	9	+9.063	2	10
6	3	(United Kingdom) Robert Huff	Volkswagen Golf GTI TCR	(Luxembourg) Leopard Racing Team WRT	9	+9.325	5	8
7	25	(Belgium) Edouard Mondron	Volkswagen Golf GTI TCR	(Belgium) Delahaye Racing	9	+9.619	8	6
8	64	(Netherlands) Tom Coronel	Honda Civic Type-R TCR	(Belgium) Boutsen Ginion Racing	9	+10.550	7	4
9	74	(Spain) Pepe Oriola	SEAT León TCR	(Hong Kong) Lukoil Craft-Bamboo Racing	9	+11.790	9	2
10	23	(Belgium) Pierre-Yves Corthals	Opel Astra TCR	(Belgium) DG Sport Compétition	9	+12.075	14	1
11	54	(United Kingdom) James Nash	SEAT León TCR	(Hong Kong) Lukoil Craft-Bamboo Racing	9	+13.133	15	
12	10	(Italy) Gianni Morbidelli	Volkswagen Golf GTI TCR	(Sweden) WestCoast Racing	9	+13.552	12	
13	21	(Italy) Giacomo Altoè	Volkswagen Golf GTI TCR	(Sweden) WestCoast Racing	9	+14.611	13	
14	55	(Hungary) Ferenc Ficza	SEAT León TCR	(Hungary) Zengő Motorsport	9	+14.611	11	
15	7	(France) Hugo Valente	SEAT León TCR	(Hong Kong) Lukoil Craft-Bamboo Racing	9	+16.397	22	
16	62	(Serbia) Dušan Borković	Alfa Romeo Giulietta TCR	(Georgia (country)) GE-Force	9	+17.184	18	
17	35	(Belgium) Maxime Potty	Volkswagen Golf GTI TCR	(Belgium) Michaël Mazuin Sport	9	+19.149	10	
18	16	(Georgia (country)) Davit Kajaia	Alfa Romeo Giulietta TCR	(Georgia (country)) GE-Force	9	+19.450	24	
19	12	(Belgium) Guillaume Mondron	SEAT León TCR	(Belgium) Delahaye Racing	9	+21.315	21	
20	5	(Italy) Roberto Colciago	Honda Civic Type-R TCR	(Hungary) M1RA	9	+25.797	17	
21	11	(Denmark) Jens Reno Møller	Honda Civic Type-R TCR	(Denmark) Reno Racing	9	+32.529	20	
22	18	(United States) Duncan Ende	SEAT León TCR	(United States) Icarus Motorsports	9	+36.992	23	
23	34	(Norway) Stian Paulsen	SEAT León TCR	(Norway) Stian Paulsen Racing	8	+1 lap	19	
24	70	(Slovakia) Maťo Homola	Opel Astra TCR	(Belgium) DG Sport Compétition	8	+1 lap	16	

=== Race 2 ===
Pos.	No.	Driver	Car	Team	Laps	Time/Retired	Grid	Points
1	2	(France) Jean-Karl Vernay	Volkswagen Golf GTI TCR	(Luxembourg) Leopard Racing Team WRT	9	23:13.917	7	25
2	3	(United Kingdom) Robert Huff	Volkswagen Golf GTI TCR	(Luxembourg) Leopard Racing Team WRT	9	+0.720	6	18
3	1	(Switzerland) Stefano Comini	Audi RS3 LMS TCR	(Belgium) Comtoyou Racing	9	+2.325	10	15
4	25	(Belgium) Edouard Mondron	Volkswagen Golf GTI TCR	(Belgium) Delahaye Racing	9	+3.888	3	12
5	63	(Belgium) Benjamin Lessennes	Honda Civic Type-R TCR	(Belgium) Boutsen Ginion Racing	9	+4.907	8	10
6	6	(Belgium) Frédéric Vervisch	Audi RS3 LMS TCR	(Belgium) Comtoyou Racing	9	+5.909	9	8
7	16	(Georgia (country)) Davit Kajaia	Alfa Romeo Giulietta TCR	(Georgia (country)) GE-Force	9	+11.790	11	6
8	54	(United Kingdom) James Nash	SEAT León TCR	(Hong Kong) Lukoil Craft-Bamboo Racing	9	+12.398	16	4
9	9	(Hungary) Attila Tassi	Honda Civic Type-R TCR	(Hungary) M1RA	9	+13.116	5	2
10	21	(Italy) Giacomo Altoè	Volkswagen Golf GTI TCR	(Sweden) WestCoast Racing	9	+13.817	14	1
11	62	(Serbia) Dušan Borković	Alfa Romeo Giulietta TCR	(Georgia (country)) GE-Force	9	+13.834	19	
12	12	(Belgium) Guillaume Mondron	SEAT León TCR	(Belgium) Delahaye Racing	9	+16.594	22	
13	5	(Italy) Roberto Colciago	Honda Civic Type-R TCR	(Hungary) M1RA	9	+22.418	18	
14	55	(Hungary) Ferenc Ficza	SEAT León TCR	(Hungary) Zengő Motorsport	9	+22.845	12	
15	10	(Italy) Gianni Morbidelli	Volkswagen Golf GTI TCR	(Sweden) WestCoast Racing	9	+23.224	13	
16	35	(Belgium) Maxime Potty	Volkswagen Golf GTI TCR	(Belgium) Michaël Mazuin Sport	9	+26.455	1	
17	18	(United States) Duncan Ende	SEAT León TCR	(United States) Icarus Motorsports	9	+35.207	24	
Ret	70	(Slovakia) Maťo Homola	Opel Astra TCR	(Belgium) DG Sport Compétition	5	Technical	17	
Ret	23	(Belgium) Pierre-Yves Corthals	Opel Astra TCR	(Belgium) DG Sport Compétition	4	Technical	15	
Ret	74	(Spain) Pepe Oriola	SEAT León TCR	(Hong Kong) Lukoil Craft-Bamboo Racing	4	Collision	2	
Ret	11	(Denmark) Jens Reno Møller	Honda Civic Type-R TCR	(Denmark) Reno Racing	2	Collision	21	
Ret	64	(Netherlands) Tom Coronel	Honda Civic Type-R TCR	(Belgium) Boutsen Ginion Racing	1	Collision	4	
Ret	34	(Norway) Stian Paulsen	SEAT León TCR	(Norway) Stian Paulsen Racing	0	Collision	20	
Ret	7	(France) Hugo Valente	SEAT León TCR	(Hong Kong) Lukoil Craft-Bamboo Racing	0	Collision	23	

== Standings after the event ==
Drivers' Championship standings

	Pos	Driver	Points
	1	(France) Jean-Karl Vernay	91
8	2	(Switzerland) Stefano Comini	66
4	3	(Hungary) Attila Tassi	53
2	4	(Serbia) Dušan Borković	51
2	5	(Italy) Roberto Colciago	50

Model of the Year standings

	Pos	Car	Points
1	1	Honda Civic Type-R TCR	146
1	2	SEAT León TCR	139
1	3	Volkswagen Golf GTI TCR	136
1	4	Alfa Romeo Giulietta TCR	102
1	5	Audi RS3 LMS TCR	96

Teams' Championship standings

	Pos	Driver	Points
3	1	(Luxembourg) Leopard Racing Team WRT	118
	2	(Hong Kong) Lukoil Craft-Bamboo Racing	109
2	3	(Hungary) M1RA	105
1	4	(Georgia (country)) GE-Force	96
1	5	(Belgium) Comtoyou Racing	92

- Note: Only the top five positions are included for both sets of drivers' standings.
