= 2016 TCR Trophy Europe =

European motorsport championship

Seasons
- ← none 2017 →

The 2016 TCR Trophy Europe was the first season of the TCR Trophy Europe.

== Calendar and results ==
The 2016 schedule was announced on 26 February 2016. The calendar includes rounds from the Russian, Italian, Benelux, German and Portuguese TCR series.

Rnd.	Circuit	Date	Winning driver	Points	Second driver	Points	Third driver	Points	Supporting
1	Smolensk Ring, Safonovo, Russia	14–15 May	(Russia) Aleksey Dudukalo	198	(Russia) Dmitry Bragin	196	(Russia) Nikolay Karamyshev	188	Russian Circuit Racing Series
2	Misano World Circuit Marco Simoncelli, Misano Adriatico, Italy	12 June	(Italy) Romy Dall'Antonia (Italy) Samuele Piccin	24	(Italy) Imerio Brigliadori (Italy) Vincenzo Montalbano	23	(Italy) Alberto Viberti	20	Italian Touring Car Championship
3	Circuit Park Zandvoort, Zandvoort, Netherlands	15–17 July	(Belgium) Stéphane Lémeret (Hungary) Norbert Michelisz	84	(Belgium) Kévin Balthazar (Belgium) Vincent Radermecker	68	(Belgium) Romain de Leval (Belgium) Alexis van de Poele	56	Deutsche Tourenwagen Masters; TCR Benelux Touring Car Championship
4	Nürburgring, Nürburg, Germany	6–7 August	(United Kingdom) Josh Files	43	(Finland) Antti Buri	25	(Germany) Mike Halder	22	ADAC GT Masters; ADAC Formula 4 Championship; ADAC TCR Germany Touring Car Championship
5	Circuit Zolder, Heusden-Zolder, Belgium	19–20 August	(Belgium) Pierre-Yves Corthals (Belgium) Frédéric Caprasse	130	(Belgium) Denis Dupont (Belgium) Sam Dejonghe	83	(Belgium) Vincent Radermecker (Belgium) Olivier Cartelle	68	24 Hours of Zolder; TCR Benelux Touring Car Championship
6	Circuito de Jerez, Jerez de la Frontera, Spain	11 September	(Belgium) Pierre-Yves Corthals (Belgium) Frédéric Caprasse	45	(Finland) Antti Buri	41	(Portugal) Francisco Abreu (Portugal) Manuel Gião	24	Campeonato Nacional de Velocidade Turismos
7	Hockenheimring, Hockenheim, Germany	1–2 October	(Germany) Steve Kirsch	43	(Sweden) Dennis Strandberg	40	(United Kingdom) Josh Files	30	ADAC GT Masters; ADAC Formula 4 Championship; Formula Renault 2.0 NEC; ADAC TCR Germany Touring Car Championship

== Championship standings ==
Only the best four results count towards the championship. The race classification is given by the aggregate points classification of the round.

Pos.	Driver	SMO (Russia)	MIS (Italy)	ZAN (Netherlands)	NÜR (Germany)	ZOL (Belgium)	JER (Spain)	HOC (Germany)	Pts.
1	(Belgium) Pierre-Yves Corthals			13^{17}	7^{15}	1^{130}	1^{45}	6^{12}	64
2	(Belgium) Frédéric Caprasse					1^{130}	1^{45}		50
3	(Finland) Antti Buri				2^{25}		2^{41}	(9^{8})	36
4	(United Kingdom) Josh Files				1^{43}			(3^{30})	25
5	(Belgium) Stéphane Lémeret			1^{84}		(4^{56})			25
6	(Germany) Steve Kirsch				(8^{13})			1^{43}	25
7	(Italy) Romy Dall'Antonia (Italy) Samuele Piccin		1^{24}						25
7	(Hungary) Norbert Michelisz			1^{84}					25
7	(Russia) Aleksey Dudukalo	1^{198}							25
11	(Belgium) Vincent Radermecker			2^{68}	12^{6}	(3^{68})			18
12	(Belgium) Sam Dejonghe (Belgium) Denis Dupont			4^{56}		2^{83}			18
14	(Russia) Dmitry Bragin	2^{196}							18
14	(Italy) Imerio Brigliadori (Italy) Vincenzo Montalbano		2^{23}						18
14	(Sweden) Dennis Strandberg							2^{40}	18
14	(Belgium) Kévin Balthazar			2^{68}					18
19	(Belgium) Romain de Leval (Belgium) Alexis van de Poele			3^{64}		(4^{37})			15
21	(Belgium) Olivier Cartelle					3^{68}			15
21	(Portugal) Francisco Abreu (Portugal) Manuel Gião						3^{24}		15
21	(Russia) Nikolay Karamyshev	3^{188}							15
21	(Italy) Alberto Viberti		3^{21}						15
21	(Germany) Mike Halder				3^{22}				15
27	(Italy) Marco Costamagna		4^{12}						12
27	(United Kingdom) Matt Neal					4^{56}			12
27	(Switzerland) Ronny Jost							4^{15}	12
27	(Portugal) César Machado (Portugal) Rafael Lobato						4^{21}		12
27	(Spain) Jordi Oriola				4^{22}				12
27	(Russia) Roman Golikov	4^{168}							12
34	(Portugal) Francisco Mora					9^{31}	5^{18}		12
35	(Belgium) Ronnie Latinne (Belgium) Maxime Potty			5^{55}		(5^{52})			10
37	(Russia) Irek Minnakhmetov	5^{166}							10
37	(Italy) Luigi Bamonte		5^{9}						10
37	(Austria) Harald Proczyk							5^{14}	10
37	(Austria) Mario Dablander				5^{20}				10
41	(Germany) Benjamin Leuchter				6^{18}			(8^{10})	8
42	(Belgium) Didier van Dalen (France) Amaury Richard			(10^{32})		6^{52}			8
44	(Russia) Lev Tolkachev	6^{164}							8
44	(Italy) Daniele Cappellari (Italy) Fabio Fabiani (Italy) Daniele Verrocchio		6^{8}						8
44	(Belgium) Ghislain Cordeel (Belgium) Jeffrey van Hooydonk			6^{53}					8
44	(Portugal) Francisco Carvalho (Portugal) Nuno Batista						6^{18}		8
52	(Portugal) José Rodrigues					9^{31}	7^{18}		8
53	(Belgium) Edouard Mondron (Belgium) Guillaume Mondron			(9^{36})		7^{42}			6
55	(Germany) Kai Jordan							7^{13}	6
55	(Russia) Pavel Yashin	7^{162}							6
55	(Netherlands) Olivier Hart (Netherlands) Loris Hezemans			7^{43}					6
59	(Belgium) Renaud Kuppens (Belgium) Benjamin Lessennes			8^{38}		10^{24}			4
61	(Russia) Marat Sharapov	8^{72}							4
61	(Portugal) Gustavo Moura						8^{12}		4
63	(Switzerland) Pascal Eberle				9^{11}				2
63	(Austria) Lukas Niedertscheider							9^{8}	2
65	(Austria) Jürgen Schmarl				10^{10}				1
Pos.	Driver	SMO (Russia)	MIS (Italy)	ZAN (Netherlands)	NÜR (Germany)	ZOL (Belgium)	JER (Spain)	HOC (Germany)	Pts.

Colour	Result
Gold	Winner
Silver	Second place
Bronze	Third place
Green	Points classification
Blue	Non-points classification
Blue	Non-classified finish (NC)
Purple	Retired, not classified (Ret)
Red	Did not qualify (DNQ)
Red	Did not pre-qualify (DNPQ)
Black	Disqualified (DSQ)
White	Did not start (DNS)
White	Withdrew (WD)
White	Race cancelled (C)
Blank	Did not practice (DNP)
Blank	Did not arrive (DNA)
Blank	Excluded (EX)

^{1} – Number of points earned in weekend
