= 2016 TCR BeNeLux Touring Car Championship =

2016 TCR Benelux Touring Car Championship

Seasons
- ← none 2017 →

Locations of the European racing circuits

The 2016 TCR Benelux Touring Car Championship is the first season of the Champions. The season started on 21 May at Spa-Francorchamps and ended on 30 October at Mettet.

== Teams and drivers ==
Michelin is the official tyre supplier.

| Team | Car | No. | Drivers | Status | Rounds |
|---|---|---|---|---|---|
| (Belgium) Boutsen Ginion Racing | Honda Civic Type R TCR (FK2) | 1 | (Netherlands) Tom Coronel | | 5 |
| (Belgium) Boutsen Ginion Racing | Honda Civic Type R TCR (FK2) | 1 | (Netherlands) Michael Verhagen | | 5 |
| (Belgium) Boutsen Ginion Racing | Honda Civic Type R TCR (FK2) | 5 | (Belgium) Renaud Kuppens | | All |
| (Belgium) Boutsen Ginion Racing | Honda Civic Type R TCR (FK2) | 5 | (Belgium) Benjamin Lessennes | J | All |
| (Belgium) Boutsen Ginion Racing | Honda Civic Type R TCR (FK2) | 13 | (France) Jean-Louis Dauger | | 2 |
| (Belgium) Boutsen Ginion Racing | Honda Civic Type R TCR (FK2) | 13 | (Portugal) Tiago Monteiro | | 2 |
| (Belgium) Boutsen Ginion Racing | Honda Civic Type R TCR (FK2) | 18 | (Belgium) Stéphane Lémeret | | All |
| (Belgium) Boutsen Ginion Racing | Honda Civic Type R TCR (FK2) | 18 | (Portugal) Tiago Monteiro | | 1 |
| (Belgium) Boutsen Ginion Racing | Honda Civic Type R TCR (FK2) | 18 | (Hungary) Norbert Michelisz | | 2, 5–6 |
| (Belgium) Boutsen Ginion Racing | Honda Civic Type R TCR (FK2) | 18 | (United Kingdom) Matt Neal | | 3 |
| (Belgium) Boutsen Ginion Racing | Honda Civic Type R TCR (FK2) | 18 | (Switzerland) Kris Richard | | 4 |
| (Belgium) Delahaye Racing Team | SEAT León Cup Racer | 2 | (Belgium) Edouard Mondron | | All |
| (Belgium) Delahaye Racing Team | SEAT León Cup Racer | 2 | (Belgium) Guillaume Mondron | | All |
| (Belgium) Delahaye Racing Team | Volkswagen Golf GTI TCR | 3 | (Belgium) Didier van Dalen | | All |
| (Belgium) Delahaye Racing Team | Volkswagen Golf GTI TCR | 3 | (France) Amaury Richard | J | All |
| (Belgium) Delahaye Racing Team | Volkswagen Golf GTI TCR | 4 | (Belgium) Romain de Leval | J | All |
| (Belgium) Delahaye Racing Team | Volkswagen Golf GTI TCR | 4 | (Belgium) Alexis van de Poele | | All |
| (Netherlands) Ferry Monster Autosport | SEAT León TCR | 6 | (Belgium) Mathieu Detry | | 2, 4, 6 |
| (Netherlands) Ferry Monster Autosport | SEAT León TCR | 6 | (Belgium) Lorenzo Donniacuo | | 2 |
| (Netherlands) Ferry Monster Autosport | SEAT León TCR | 6 | (Portugal) Francisco Mora | J | 3 |
| (Netherlands) Ferry Monster Autosport | SEAT León TCR | 6 | (Portugal) José Rodrigues | | 3 |
| (Netherlands) Ferry Monster Autosport | SEAT León TCR | 6 | (Belgium) Matthieu de Robiano | | 4 |
| (Netherlands) Ferry Monster Autosport | SEAT León TCR | 6 | (Netherlands) Willem Meijer | | 6 |
| (Netherlands) Ferry Monster Autosport | SEAT León TCR | 10 | (Netherlands) Loris Hezemans | J | 1–2 |
| (Netherlands) Ferry Monster Autosport | SEAT León TCR | 10 | (Belgium) Vincent Radermecker | | 1 |
| (Netherlands) Ferry Monster Autosport | SEAT León TCR | 10 | (Netherlands) Olivier Hart | J | 2 |
| (Belgium) / RACB National Team (Note: Car No. 7 entered as RACB National Team and car No. 52 entered as Team WRT.); (Belgium) / Team WRT | SEAT León Cup Racer | 7 | (Belgium) Sam Dejonghe | | All |
| (Belgium) / RACB National Team; (Belgium) / Team WRT | SEAT León Cup Racer | 7 | (Belgium) Denis Dupont | | All |
| (Belgium) / RACB National Team; (Belgium) / Team WRT | Volkswagen Golf GTI TCR | 52 | (Belgium) Maxime Potty | J | All |
| (Belgium) / RACB National Team; (Belgium) / Team WRT | Volkswagen Golf GTI TCR | 52 | (Belgium) Ronnie Latinne | | 1–3 |
| (Belgium) / RACB National Team; (Belgium) / Team WRT | Volkswagen Golf GTI TCR | 52 | (Switzerland) Stefano Comini | | 4 |
| (Belgium) / RACB National Team; (Belgium) / Team WRT | Volkswagen Golf GTI TCR | 52 | (Netherlands) Loris Hezemans | | 5 |
| (Belgium) / RACB National Team; (Belgium) / Team WRT | Volkswagen Golf GTI TCR | 52 | (France) Grégoire Demoustier | | 6 |
| (Belgium) Peugeot Belgique Luxembourg | Peugeot 308 Racing Cup | 8 | (Belgium) Frédéric Bouvy | | 6 |
| (Belgium) Peugeot Belgique Luxembourg | Peugeot 308 Racing Cup | 8 | (France) Aurélien Comte | | 6 |
| (Netherlands) Bas Koeten Racing | SEAT León Cup Racer | 9 | (Luxembourg) Loris Cencetti | | 1 |
| (Netherlands) Bas Koeten Racing | SEAT León Cup Racer | 9 | (Belgium) Cédric Cherain | | 1 |
| (Netherlands) Bas Koeten Racing | SEAT León Cup Racer | 9 | (Netherlands) Meindert van Buuren | J | 5 |
| (Netherlands) Bas Koeten Racing | SEAT León Cup Racer | 9 | (Netherlands) Marcel Dekker | | 5 |
| (Netherlands) Bas Koeten Racing | SEAT León Cup Racer | 11 | (Netherlands) Tom Coronel | | 1 |
| (Netherlands) Bas Koeten Racing | SEAT León Cup Racer | 11 | (Belgium) Jamie Vandenbalck | J | 1 |
| (Netherlands) Bas Koeten Racing | SEAT León Cup Racer | 22 | (Belgium) Ghislain Cordeel | J | 2 |
| (Netherlands) Bas Koeten Racing | SEAT León Cup Racer | 22 | (Belgium) Jeffrey van Hooydonk | | 2 |
| (Netherlands) Bas Koeten Racing | SEAT León Cup Racer | 34 | (Netherlands) Bas Schouten | | 2, 5 |
| (Netherlands) Bas Koeten Racing | SEAT León Cup Racer | 34 | (Netherlands) Michael Verhagen | | 2 |
| (Netherlands) Bas Koeten Racing | SEAT León Cup Racer | 34 | (Netherlands) Bas Koeten | | 5 |
| (Germany) Lubner Motorsport | Honda Civic Type R TCR (FK2) | 15 | (Switzerland) Roger Vögeli | | 6 |
| (Germany) Lubner Motorsport | Honda Civic Type R TCR (FK2) | 15 | (Switzerland) Daniel Hadorn | | 6 |
| (Belgium) Milo Racing | Volkswagen Golf GTI TCR | 20 | (Belgium) Kévin Balthazar | | 1–2 |
| (Belgium) Milo Racing | Volkswagen Golf GTI TCR | 20 | (Belgium) Frédéric Bouvy | | 1 |
| (Belgium) Milo Racing | Volkswagen Golf GTI TCR | 20 | (Belgium) Vincent Radermecker | | 2–4, 6 |
| (Belgium) Milo Racing | Volkswagen Golf GTI TCR | 20 | (Belgium) Olivier Cartelle | | 3 |
| (Belgium) Milo Racing | Volkswagen Golf GTI TCR | 20 | (Belgium) Lorenzo Donniacuo | | 4 |
| (Belgium) Milo Racing | Volkswagen Golf GTI TCR | 20 | (Belgium) Stienes Longin | | 6 |
| (Belgium) Milo Racing | Volkswagen Golf GTI TCR | 21 | (Belgium) Steve van Bellingen | | 1–4 |
| (Belgium) Milo Racing | Volkswagen Golf GTI TCR | 21 | (Belgium) David Dermont | | 1–4 |
| (Belgium) DG Sport Compétition | Opel Astra TCR | 23 | (Belgium) Frédéric Caprasse | | All |
| (Belgium) DG Sport Compétition | Opel Astra TCR | 23 | (Belgium) Pierre-Yves Corthals | | All |
| (Belgium) Charleroi on Tracks | Alfa Romeo Giulietta TCR | 27 | (Belgium) Fabio Marchiafava | | 4–6 |
| (Belgium) Charleroi on Tracks | Alfa Romeo Giulietta TCR | 27 | (Luxembourg) Loris Cencetti | | 4–5 |
| (Belgium) Charleroi on Tracks | Alfa Romeo Giulietta TCR | 27 | (Belgium) Philippe Ménage | | 6 |

| Icon | Legend |
|---|---|
| J | Junior |

== Calendar and results ==
The 2016 schedule consists in six rounds in the Benelux region, across Belgium, Netherlands and Luxembourg. Each round includes five races: a 60-minute-long qualifying race with a mandatory driver change, and four 20-minute-long sprint races. The starting grid for the qualifying race is established by a popular vote via Facebook, through the Making the Grid application. Race 1 uses the fastest lap of after the pit stop during the qualifying race to determine the starting grid. Race 3 uses the fastest lap of before the pit stop during qualifying race. Races 2 and 4 include a rolling start using the finishing order, respectively, of Race 1 and 3. The order for the qualifying race was subsequently revised with an aggregate score from the fan voting and the fastest laps from the final 15 minutes from the 45-minute Free Practice session (Fast lap window) held before the qualifying race. In case of a tie in the aggregate score, the results from the fan voting will have bigger weight. The calendar was announced on 17 November 2015.

| Rnd. | Race | Circuit | Date | Pole position | Fastest lap | Winning driver | Winning team | Supporting |
|---|---|---|---|---|---|---|---|---|
| 1 | QR | (Belgium) Circuit de Spa-Francorchamps, Francorchamps | 21 May | (Belgium) Stéphane Lémeret (Portugal) Tiago Monteiro | (Belgium) Frédéric Caprasse (Belgium) Pierre-Yves Corthals | (Belgium) Stéphane Lémeret (Portugal) Tiago Monteiro | (Belgium) Boutsen Ginion Racing | International GT Open; Formula V8 3.5 Series; Euroformula Open |
| 1 | R1 | (Belgium) Circuit de Spa-Francorchamps, Francorchamps | 22 May | (Netherlands) Tom Coronel | (Belgium) Vincent Radermecker | (Portugal) Tiago Monteiro | (Belgium) Boutsen Ginion Racing | International GT Open; Formula V8 3.5 Series; Euroformula Open |
| 1 | R2 | (Belgium) Circuit de Spa-Francorchamps, Francorchamps | 22 May | | (Belgium) Sam Dejonghe | (Belgium) Guillaume Mondron | (Belgium) Delahaye Racing Team | International GT Open; Formula V8 3.5 Series; Euroformula Open |
| 1 | R3 | (Belgium) Circuit de Spa-Francorchamps, Francorchamps | 22 May | (Belgium) Pierre-Yves Corthals | (Belgium) Renaud Kuppens | (Belgium) Renaud Kuppens | (Belgium) Boutsen Ginion Racing | International GT Open; Formula V8 3.5 Series; Euroformula Open |
| 1 | R4 | (Belgium) Circuit de Spa-Francorchamps, Francorchamps | 22 May | | (Netherlands) Loris Hezemans | (Belgium) Renaud Kuppens | (Belgium) Boutsen Ginion Racing | International GT Open; Formula V8 3.5 Series; Euroformula Open |
| 2 | QR | (Netherlands) Circuit Park Zandvoort, Zandvoort | 15 July | (France) Jean-Louis Dauger (Portugal) Tiago Monteiro | (Netherlands) Olivier Hart (Netherlands) Loris Hezemans | (Belgium) Sam Dejonghe (Belgium) Denis Dupont | (Belgium) RACB National Team | Deutsche Tourenwagen Masters; TCR Trophy Europe |
| 2 | R1 | (Netherlands) Circuit Park Zandvoort, Zandvoort | 16 July | (Portugal) Tiago Monteiro | (Hungary) Norbert Michelisz | (Hungary) Norbert Michelisz | (Belgium) Boutsen Ginion Racing | Deutsche Tourenwagen Masters; TCR Trophy Europe |
| 2 | R2 | (Netherlands) Circuit Park Zandvoort, Zandvoort | 16 July | | (France) Amaury Richard | (Belgium) Vincent Radermecker | (Belgium) Milo Racing | Deutsche Tourenwagen Masters; TCR Trophy Europe |
| 2 | R3 | (Netherlands) Circuit Park Zandvoort, Zandvoort | 17 July | (Netherlands) Loris Hezemans | (Belgium) Jeffrey van Hooydonk | (Belgium) Jeffrey van Hooydonk | (Netherlands) Bas Koeten Racing | Deutsche Tourenwagen Masters; TCR Trophy Europe |
| 2 | R4 | (Netherlands) Circuit Park Zandvoort, Zandvoort | 17 July | | (Belgium) Didier van Dalen | (Netherlands) Loris Hezemans | (Netherlands) Ferry Monster Autosport | Deutsche Tourenwagen Masters; TCR Trophy Europe |
| 3 | QR | (Belgium) Circuit Zolder, Heusden-Zolder | 18 August | (Belgium) Frédéric Caprasse (Belgium) Pierre-Yves Corthals | (Belgium) Frédéric Caprasse (Belgium) Pierre-Yves Corthals | (Belgium) Frédéric Caprasse (Belgium) Pierre-Yves Corthals | (Belgium) DG Sport Compétition | 24 Hours of Zolder; TCR Trophy Europe |
| 3 | R1 | (Belgium) Circuit Zolder, Heusden-Zolder | 20 August | (Belgium) Sam Dejonghe | (Belgium) Didier van Dalen | (Belgium) Vincent Radermecker | (Belgium) Milo Racing | 24 Hours of Zolder; TCR Trophy Europe |
| 3 | R2 | (Belgium) Circuit Zolder, Heusden-Zolder | 20 August | | (Belgium) Frédéric Caprasse | (Belgium) Vincent Radermecker | (Belgium) Milo Racing | 24 Hours of Zolder; TCR Trophy Europe |
| 3 | R3 | (Belgium) Circuit Zolder, Heusden-Zolder | 20 August | (Belgium) Pierre-Yves Corthals | (France) Amaury Richard | (Belgium) Pierre-Yves Corthals | (Belgium) DG Sport Compétition | 24 Hours of Zolder; TCR Trophy Europe |
| 3 | R4 | (Belgium) Circuit Zolder, Heusden-Zolder | 20 August | | (Belgium) Pierre-Yves Corthals | (Belgium) Pierre-Yves Corthals | (Belgium) DG Sport Compétition | 24 Hours of Zolder; TCR Trophy Europe |
| 4 | QR | (Luxembourg) Circuit Goodyear, Colmar-Berg | 24 September | (Switzerland) Stefano Comini (Belgium) Maxime Potty | (Switzerland) Stefano Comini (Belgium) Maxime Potty | (Switzerland) Stefano Comini (Belgium) Maxime Potty | (Belgium) Team WRT | Headline |
| 4 | R1 | (Luxembourg) Circuit Goodyear, Colmar-Berg | 25 September | (Belgium) Maxime Potty | (Belgium) Maxime Potty | (Belgium) Stéphane Lémeret | (Belgium) Boutsen Ginion Racing | Headline |
| 4 | R2 | (Luxembourg) Circuit Goodyear, Colmar-Berg | 25 September | | (Belgium) Frédéric Caprasse | (Belgium) Frédéric Caprasse | (Belgium) DG Sport Compétition | Headline |
| 4 | R3 | (Luxembourg) Circuit Goodyear, Colmar-Berg | 25 September | (Switzerland) Stefano Comini | (Belgium) Vincent Radermecker | (Switzerland) Stefano Comini | (Belgium) Team WRT | Headline |
| 4 | R4 | (Luxembourg) Circuit Goodyear, Colmar-Berg | 25 September | | (Belgium) Mathieu Detry | (Belgium) Pierre-Yves Corthals | (Belgium) DG Sport Compétition | Headline |
| 5 | QR | (Netherlands) TT Circuit Assen, Assen | 23 October | (Netherlands) Loris Hezemans (Belgium) Maxime Potty | (Hungary) Norbert Michelisz (Belgium) Stéphane Lémeret | (Belgium) Sam Dejonghe (Belgium) Denis Dupont | (Belgium) RACB National Team | Dutch Supercar Challenge |
| 5 | R1 | (Netherlands) TT Circuit Assen, Assen | 23 October | (Belgium) Renaud Kuppens | (Belgium) Renaud Kuppens | (Belgium) Renaud Kuppens | (Belgium) Boutsen Ginion Racing | Dutch Supercar Challenge |
| 5 | R2 | (Netherlands) TT Circuit Assen, Assen | 23 October | | (Belgium) Renaud Kuppens | (Belgium) Renaud Kuppens | (Belgium) Boutsen Ginion Racing | Dutch Supercar Challenge |
| 5 | R3 | (Netherlands) TT Circuit Assen, Assen | 23 October | (Hungary) Norbert Michelisz | (Hungary) Norbert Michelisz | (Hungary) Norbert Michelisz | (Belgium) Boutsen Ginion Racing | Dutch Supercar Challenge |
| 5 | R4 | (Netherlands) TT Circuit Assen, Assen | 23 October | | (Hungary) Norbert Michelisz | (Hungary) Norbert Michelisz | (Belgium) Boutsen Ginion Racing | Dutch Supercar Challenge |
| 6 | QR | (Belgium) Circuit Jules Tacheny Mettet, Mettet | 30 October | (Hungary) Norbert Michelisz (Belgium) Stéphane Lémeret | (Hungary) Norbert Michelisz (Belgium) Stéphane Lémeret | (Hungary) Norbert Michelisz (Belgium) Stéphane Lémeret | (Belgium) Boutsen Ginion Racing | 10 Hours of Mettet |
| 6 | R1 | (Belgium) Circuit Jules Tacheny Mettet, Mettet | 30 October | (France) Amaury Richard | (Belgium) Frédéric Caprasse | (Belgium) Benjamin Lessennes | (Belgium) Boutsen Ginion Racing | 10 Hours of Mettet |
| 6 | R2 | (Belgium) Circuit Jules Tacheny Mettet, Mettet | 30 October | | (Belgium) Frédéric Caprasse | (Belgium) Frédéric Caprasse | (Belgium) DG Sport Compétition | 10 Hours of Mettet |
| 6 | R3 | (Belgium) Circuit Jules Tacheny Mettet, Mettet | 30 October | (Hungary) Norbert Michelisz | (Hungary) Norbert Michelisz | (Hungary) Norbert Michelisz | (Belgium) Boutsen Ginion Racing | 10 Hours of Mettet |
| 6 | R4 | (Belgium) Circuit Jules Tacheny Mettet, Mettet | 30 October | | (Hungary) Norbert Michelisz | (Hungary) Norbert Michelisz | (Belgium) Boutsen Ginion Racing | 10 Hours of Mettet |

== Championship standings ==
Scoring systems

Qualifying race

| Position | **1st** | **2nd** | **3rd** | **4th** | **5th** | **6th** | **7th** | **8th** | **9th** | **10th** |
| Points | 50 | 36 | 30 | 24 | 20 | 16 | 12 | 8 | 4 | 2 |

Sprint races

| Position | **1st** | **2nd** | **3rd** | **4th** | **5th** | **6th** | **7th** | **8th** | **9th** | **10th** |
| Points | 25 | 18 | 15 | 12 | 10 | 8 | 6 | 4 | 2 | 1 |

In every classification, points from the worst round are dropped.

=== Drivers' championships ===
In sprint races both the competing driver and the co-driver that is not competing score points.

| Pos. | Driver | SPA‡ (Belgium) | | | | | ZAN (Netherlands) | | | | | ZOL (Belgium) | | | | | GOO (Luxembourg) | | | | | ASS (Netherlands) | | | | | MET (Belgium) | | | | | Pts. |
| Pos. | Driver | QR | R1 | R2 | R3 | R4 | QR | R1 | R2 | R3 | R4 | QR | R1 | R2 | R3 | R4 | QR | R1 | R2 | R3 | R4 | QR | R1 | R2 | R3 | R4 | QR | R1 | R2 | R3 | R4 | Pts. |
|---|---|---|---|---|---|---|---|---|---|---|---|---|---|---|---|---|---|---|---|---|---|---|---|---|---|---|---|---|---|---|---|---|
| 1 | (Belgium) Stéphane Lémeret | **1** | | | 2 | 2 | 3 | | | 7 | 6 | 8 | | | 4 | 2 | 4 | 1 | 4 | | | NC | 8 | NC | | | **1** | 3 | 2 | | | 487 |
| 2 | (Belgium) Frédéric Caprasse | 2 | Ret | DNS | | | 14 | 12 | 9 | | | **1** | 4 | 2 | | | 2 | 4 | 1 | | | 3 | 10 | EX | | | 2 | 2 | 1 | | | 429.5 |
| 2 | (Belgium) Pierre-Yves Corthals | 2 | | | **3** | 3 | 14 | | | 3 | Ret | **1** | | | **1** | 1 | 2 | | | 2 | 1 | 3 | | | NC | DNS | 2 | | | 3 | Ret | 429.5 |
| 3 | (Belgium) Sam Dejonghe | 4 | 2 | 10 | | | 1 | 13 | 7 | | | 3 | **3** | 4 | | | Ret | 7 | 7 | | | 1 | 2 | NC | | | 3 | 5 | 7 | | | 314 |
| 3 | (Belgium) Denis Dupont | 4 | | | 8 | 6 | 1 | | | 11 | 11 | 3 | | | 2 | 6 | Ret | | | 8 | 6 | 1 | | | NC | DNS | 3 | | | 9 | 6 | 314 |
| 4 | (Belgium) Romain de Leval | 3 | 3 | 4 | | | 2 | 5 | 5 | | | Ret | 5 | Ret | | | 5 | 9 | 8 | | | 8 | 9 | 6 | | | 4 | 4 | 5 | | | 292 |
| 4 | (Belgium) Alexis van de Poele | 3 | | | 4 | 12 | 2 | | | 6 | 13 | Ret | | | 3 | 4 | 5 | | | 5 | 3 | 8 | | | 5 | 5 | 4 | | | 4 | 3 | 292 |
| 5 | (Belgium) Renaud Kuppens | 5 | | | 1 | 1 | DNS | | | 15 | 4 | 4 | | | DNS | DNS | 11 | 11 | Ret | | | 2 | **1** | 1 | | | 7 | | | NC | 5 | 283.5 |
| 5 | (Belgium) Benjamin Lessennes | 5 | 12 | Ret | | | DNS | 6 | 2 | | | 4 | 11 | DNS | | | 11 | | | Ret | Ret | 2 | | | 9 | 4 | 7 | 1 | 3 | | | 283.5 |
| 6 | (Belgium) Maxime Potty | 11 | 8 | 5 | | | 5 | | | 10 | 5 | 2 | 10 | Ret | | | **1** | **2** | 2 | | | **NC** | 3 | 2 | | | 10 | 7 | 9 | | | 281 |
| 7 | (Hungary) Norbert Michelisz | | | | | | 3 | 1 | 3 | | | | | | | | | | | | | NC | | | **1** | 1 | **1** | | | **1** | 1 | 271 |
| 8 | (Belgium) Edouard Mondron | 6 | | | 6 | 4 | 6 | | | 12 | 7 | 5 | 7 | 3 | | | 3 | 10 | 9 | | | 6 | | | 8 | 6 | 11 | | | 5 | 5 | 251 |
| 8 | (Belgium) Guillaume Mondron | 6 | 10 | 1 | | | 6 | 7 | 6 | | | 5 | | | 9 | DNS | 3 | | | 6 | 5 | 6 | 6 | 4 | | | 11 | 6 | 4 | | | 251 |
| 9 | (Belgium) Didier van Dalen | 7 | 11 | Ret | | | 10 | | | 4 | 12 | 6 | 2 | 6 | | | 9 | | | 9 | 7 | 4 | 12 | 7 | | | 6 | | | 6 | 7 | 220 |
| 9 | (France) Amaury Richard | 7 | | | 9 | 7 | 10 | 2 | Ret | | | 6 | | | 5 | Ret | 9 | 3 | 3 | | | 4 | | | 3 | 3 | 6 | **NC** | 6 | | | 220 |
| 10 | (Belgium) Vincent Radermecker | 12 | 5 | 9 | | | 4 | 3 | 1 | | | 7 | 1 | 1 | | | 10 | | | 7 | Ret | | | | | | 13 | 10 | 11 | | | 150 |
| 11 | (Belgium) Ronnie Latinne | 11 | | | 10 | 8 | 5 | 4 | 4 | | | 2 | | | 10 | 5 | | | | | | | | | | | | | | | | 122 |
| 12 | (Portugal) Tiago Monteiro | **1** | 1 | 2 | | | **12** | **Ret** | 11 | | | | | | | | | | | | | | | | | | | | | | | 121 |
| 13 | (Switzerland) Stefano Comini | | | | | | | | | | | | | | | | **1** | | | **1** | Ret | | | | | | | | | | | 111 |
| 14 | (Belgium) Kévin Balthazar | 13 | 4 | 6 | | | 4 | | | 9 | 9 | | | | | | | | | | | | | | | | | | | | | 96 |
| 14 | (Netherlands) Loris Hezemans | 12 | | | 13 | 13 | 13 | | | **2** | 1 | | | | | | | | | | | **NC** | | | 4 | NC | | | | | | 96 |
| 15 | (Belgium) Mathieu Detry | | | | | | 8 | | | 8 | 3 | | | | | | 7 | | | 4 | 4 | | | | | | 9 | | | 6 | Ret | 95 |
| 16 | (Switzerland) Kris Richard | | | | | | | | | | | | | | | | 4 | | | 3 | 2 | | | | | | | | | | | 94 |
| 17 | (Belgium) Frédéric Bouvy | 13 | | | 5 | 11 | | | | | | | | | | | | | | | | | | | | | 5 | 9 | 8 | | | 90 |
| 18 | (Belgium) Olivier Cartelle | | | | | | | | | | | 7 | | | 8 | 8 | | | | | | | | | | | | | | | | 68 |
| 18 | (Netherlands) Michael Verhagen | | | | | | 7 | 11 | 12 | | | | | | | | | | | | | NC | 5 | NC | | | | | | | | 68 |
| 19 | (Netherlands) Tom Coronel | 10 | **7** | 3 | | | | | | | | | | | | | | | | | | NC | | | 2 | 2 | | | | | | 64 |
| 20 | (France) Aurélien Comte | | | | | | | | | | | | | | | | | | | | | | | | | | 5 | | | 2 | 2 | 62 |
| 21 | (Luxembourg) Loris Cencetti | 9 | 6 | 8 | | | | | | | | | | | | | 8 | 10 | 5 | | | 9 | | | 7 | 7 | | | | | | 61 |
| 22 | (Belgium) Lorenzo Donniacuo | | | | | | 8 | 8 | 10 | | | | | | | | 10 | 5 | 6 | | | | | | | | | | | | | 58 |
| 22 | (Netherlands) Bas Schouten | | | | | | 7 | | | 5 | Ret | | | | | | | | | | | | | 7 | | | 6 | NC | | | | 58 |
| 23 | (United Kingdom) Matt Neal | | | | | | | | | | | 8 | 6 | 5 | | | | | | | | | | | | | | | | | | 56 |
| 24 | (Belgium) Ghislain Cordeel | | | | | | 9 | 9 | 8 | | | | | | | | | | | | | | | | | | | | | | | 53 |
| 24 | (Belgium) Jeffrey van Hooydonk | | | | | | 9 | | | 1 | 2 | | | | | | | | | | | | | | | | | | | | | 53 |
| 25 | (Belgium) Steve van Bellingen | 8 | | | 12 | 10 | 11 | 10 | Ret | | | Ret | 9 | Ret | | | 6 | | | 10 | 8 | | | | | | | | | | | 52.5 |
| 25 | (Belgium) David Dermont | 8 | 9 | 7 | | | 11 | | | 13 | 8 | Ret | | | 7 | 7 | 6 | Ret | 12 | | | | | | | | | | | | | 52.5 |
| 26 | (Netherlands) Meindert van Buuren | | | | | | | | | | | | | | | | | | | | | 5 | 4 | 3 | | | | | | | | 52 |
| 26 | (Netherlands) Marcel Dekker | | | | | | | | | | | | | | | | | | | | | 5 | | | 10 | 8 | | | | | | 52 |
| 27 | (Belgium) Mathieu de Robiano | | | | | | | | | | | | | | | | 7 | 7 | 8 | | | | | | | | | | | | | 46 |
| 28 | (Netherlands) Olivier Hart | | | | | | 13 | Ret | 13 | | | | | | | | | | | | | | | | | | | | | | | 43 |
| 29 | (Belgium) Fabio Marchiafava | | | | | | | | | | | | | | | | 8 | | | NC | Ret | 9 | 12 | 8 | | | 12 | DNS | DNS | 11 | 9 | 40 |
| 30 | (Netherlands) Bas Koeten | | | | | | | | | | | | | | | | | | | | | 7 | 7 | 5 | | | | | | | | 36 |
| 31 | (Portugal) Francisco Mora | | | | | | | | | | | 9 | | | 6 | 3 | | | | | | | | | | | | | | | | 31 |
| 31 | (Portugal) José Rodrigues | | | | | | | | | | | 9 | 8 | Ret | | | | | | | | | | | | | | | | | | 31 |
| 32 | (Belgium) Cédric Cherain | 9 | | | 7 | 5 | | | | | | | | | | | | | | | | | | | | | | | | | | 23 |
| 33 | (Belgium) Jamie Vandenbalck | 10 | | | 11 | 9 | | | | | | | | | | | | | | | | | | | | | | | | | | 20 |
| 34 | (Netherlands) Willem Meijer | | | | | | | | | | | | | | | | | | | | | | | | | 9 | 8 | 10 | | | | 17 |
| 35 | (France) Grégoire Demoustier | | | | | | | | | | | | | | | | | | | | | | | | | | 10 | | | 7 | NC | 16 |
| 36 | (Switzerland) Roger Vogeli | | | | | | | | | | | | | | | | | | | | | | | | | | 8 | 11 | 12 | | | 13 |
| 36 | (Switzerland) Daniel Hadorn | | | | | | | | | | | | | | | | | | | | | | | | | | 8 | | | 10 | 8 | 13 |
| 37 | (Belgium) Stienes Longin | | | | | | | | | | | | | | | | | | | | | | | | | | 13 | | | NC | 10 | 2 |
| 37 | (Belgium) Philippe Ménage | | | | | | | | | | | | | | | | | | | | | | | | | | 12 | | | | | 2 |
| 38 | (France) Jean-Louis Dauger | | | | | | **12** | | | 14 | 10 | | | | | | | | | | | | | | | | | | | | | 1 |
| Pos. | Driver | QR | R1 | R2 | R3 | R4 | QR | R1 | R2 | R3 | R4 | QR | R1 | R2 | R3 | R4 | QR | R1 | R2 | R3 | R4 | QR | R1 | R2 | R3 | R4 | QR | R1 | R2 | R3 | R4 | Pts. |
| Pos. | Driver | SPA‡ (Belgium) | | | | | ZAN (Netherlands) | | | | | ZOL (Belgium) | | | | | GOO (Luxembourg) | | | | | ASS (Netherlands) | | | | | MET (Belgium) | | | | | Pts. |

| Colour | Result |
|---|---|
| Gold | Winner |
| Silver | Second place |
| Bronze | Third place |
| Green | Points classification |
| Blue | Non-points classification |
| Blue | Non-classified finish (NC) |
| Purple | Retired, not classified (Ret) |
| Red | Did not qualify (DNQ) |
| Red | Did not pre-qualify (DNPQ) |
| Black | Disqualified (DSQ) |
| White | Did not start (DNS) |
| White | Withdrew (WD) |
| White | Race cancelled (C) |
| Blank | Did not practice (DNP) |
| Blank | Did not arrive (DNA) |
| Blank | Excluded (EX) |

**Bold** – Pole
Italics – Fastest Lap

Notes

- ‡ – Half points were awarded in Race 4 at Spa-Francorchamps as less than 75% of the scheduled distance was completed due to heavy rain.

==== Junior class ====
In contrast to the overall Drivers' championship only the driver competing scores points in sprint races.

| Pos. | Driver | SPA‡ (Belgium) | | | | | ZAN (Netherlands) | | | | | ZOL (Belgium) | | | | | GOO (Luxembourg) | | | | | ASS (Netherlands) | | | | | MET (Belgium) | | | | | Pts. |
| Pos. | Driver | QR | R1 | R2 | R3 | R4 | QR | R1 | R2 | R3 | R4 | QR | R1 | R2 | R3 | R4 | QR | R1 | R2 | R3 | R4 | QR | R1 | R2 | R3 | R4 | QR | R1 | R2 | R3 | R4 | Pts. |
|---|---|---|---|---|---|---|---|---|---|---|---|---|---|---|---|---|---|---|---|---|---|---|---|---|---|---|---|---|---|---|---|---|
| 1 | (Belgium) Romain de Leval | 3 | 3 | 4 | | | 2 | 5 | 5 | | | Ret | 5 | Ret | | | 5 | 9 | 8 | | | 8 | 9 | 6 | | | 4 | 4 | 5 | | | 200 |
| 2 | (Belgium) Maxime Potty | 11 | 8 | 5 | | | 5 | | | 10 | 5 | 2 | 10 | Ret | | | **1** | **2** | 2 | | | **NC** | 3 | 2 | | | 10 | 7 | 9 | | | 198 |
| 3 | (Belgium) Benjamin Lessennes | 5 | 12 | Ret | | | DNS | 6 | 2 | | | 4 | 11 | DNS | | | 11 | | | Ret | Ret | 2 | | | 9 | 4 | 7 | 1 | 3 | | | 160 |
| 4 | (France) Amaury Richard | 7 | | | 9 | 7 | 10 | 2 | Ret | | | 6 | | | 5 | Ret | 9 | 3 | 3 | | | 4 | | | 3 | 3 | 6 | NC | 6 | | | 158 |
| 5 | (Belgium) Mathieu Detry | | | | | | 8 | | | 8 | 3 | | | | | | 7 | | | 4 | 4 | | | | | | 9 | | | 6 | Ret | 75 |
| 6 | (Netherlands) Loris Hezemans | 12 | | | 13 | 13 | 13 | | | **2** | 1 | | | | | | | | | | | **NC** | | | 4 | NC | | | | | | 55 |
| 7 | (Netherlands) Meindert van Buuren | | | | | | | | | | | | | | | | | | | | | 5 | 4 | 3 | | | | | | | | 47 |
| 8 | (Portugal) Francisco Mora | | | | | | | | | | | 9 | | | 6 | 3 | | | | | | | | | | | | | | | | 27 |
| 9 | (Netherlands) Willem Meijer | | | | | | | | | | | | | | | | | | | | | | | | | 9 | 8 | 10 | | | | 9 |
| 10 | (Belgium) Ghislain Cordeel | | | | | | 9 | 9 | 8 | | | | | | | | | | | | | | | | | | | | | | | 6 |
| 11 | (Belgium) Jamie Vandenbalck | 10 | | | 11 | 9 | | | | | | | | | | | | | | | | | | | | | | | | | | 2 |
| NC | (Netherlands) Olivier Hart | | | | | | 13 | Ret | 13 | | | | | | | | | | | | | | | | | | | | | | | 0 |
| Pos. | Driver | QR | R1 | R2 | R3 | R4 | QR | R1 | R2 | R3 | R4 | QR | R1 | R2 | R3 | R4 | QR | R1 | R2 | R3 | R4 | QR | R1 | R2 | R3 | R4 | QR | R1 | R2 | R3 | R4 | Pts. |
| Pos. | Driver | SPA‡ (Belgium) | | | | | ZAN (Netherlands) | | | | | ZOL (Belgium) | | | | | GOO (Luxembourg) | | | | | ASS (Netherlands) | | | | | MET (Belgium) | | | | | Pts. |

Notes

- ‡ – Half points were awarded in Race 4 at Spa-Francorchamps as less than 75% of the scheduled distance was completed due to heavy rain.

=== Teams' championship ===
Points toward the Teams' championship are only awarded in the qualifying race.

| Pos. | Team | SPA (Belgium) | ZAN (Netherlands) | ZOL (Belgium) | GOO (Luxembourg) | ASS (Netherlands) | MET (Belgium) | Pts. |
|---|---|---|---|---|---|---|---|---|
| 1 | (Belgium) RACB National Team/Team WRT | 4 | 1 | 2 | **1** | **1** | 3 | 216 |
| 2 | (Belgium) Boutsen Ginion Racing | **1** | **3** | 4 | 4 | 2 | **1** | 196 |
| 3 | (Belgium) DG Sport Compétition | 2 | 14 | **1** | 2 | 3 | 2 | 188 |
| 4 | (Belgium) Delahaye Racing Team | 3 | 2 | 5 | 3 | 4 | 4 | 144 |
| 5 | (Belgium) Milo Racing | 8 | 4 | 7 | 6 | | 13 | 88 |
| 6 | (Netherlands) Ferry Monster Autosport | 12 | 8 | 9 | 7 | | 9 | 72 |
| 7 | (Netherlands) Bas Koeten Racing | 9 | 7 | | | 5 | | 36 |
| 8 | (Belgium) Charleroi on Tracks | | | | 8 | 9 | 12 | 32 |
| 9 | (Belgium) Peugeot Belgique Luxemburg | | | | | | 5 | 20 |
| 10 | (Germany) Lubner Motorsport | | | | | | 8 | 16 |
| Pos. | Team | SPA (Belgium) | ZAN (Netherlands) | ZOL (Belgium) | GOO (Luxembourg) | ASS (Netherlands) | MET (Belgium) | Pts. |

=== Cars' championship ===
Points toward the Cars' championship are only awarded in the sprint races.

| Pos. | Car | SPA‡ (Belgium) | | | | ZAN (Netherlands) | | | | ZOL (Belgium) | | | | GOO (Luxembourg) | | | | ASS (Netherlands) | | | | MET (Belgium) | | | | Pts. |
| Pos. | Car | RD1 | RD2 | RD3 | RD4 | RD1 | RD2 | RD3 | RD4 | RD1 | RD2 | RD3 | RD4 | RD1 | RD2 | RD3 | RD4 | RD1 | RD2 | RD3 | RD4 | RD1 | RD2 | RD3 | RD4 | Pts. |
|---|---|---|---|---|---|---|---|---|---|---|---|---|---|---|---|---|---|---|---|---|---|---|---|---|---|---|
| 1 | Honda Civic Type R TCR (FK2) | 1 | 2 | 1 | 1 | **1** | 2 | 7 | 4 | 6 | 5 | 4 | 2 | 1 | 4 | 3 | 2 | **1** | 1 | **1** | 1 | 1 | 2 | **1** | 1 | 400.5 |
| 2 | Volkswagen Golf GTI TCR | 3 | 4 | 4 | 7 | 2 | 1 | 4 | 5 | 1 | 1 | 3 | 4 | **2** | 2 | **1** | 3 | 3 | 2 | 3 | 3 | **4** | 5 | 4 | 3 | 344 |
| 3 | SEAT León Cup Racer/León TCR | **2** | 1 | 6 | 4 | 7 | 6 | **1** | 1 | **3** | 3 | 2 | 3 | 7 | 6 | 4 | 4 | 2 | 3 | 6 | 6 | 5 | 4 | 5 | 5 | 308 |
| 4 | Opel Astra TCR | Ret | DNS | **3** | 3 | 12 | 9 | 3 | Ret | 4 | 2 | **1** | 1 | 4 | 1 | 2 | 1 | 10 | EX | NC | DNS | 2 | 1 | 3 | Ret | 266.5 |
| 5 | Alfa Romeo Giulietta TCR | | | | | | | | | | | | | 5 | NC | NC | Ret | 12 | 8 | 7 | 7 | DNS | DNS | 11 | 9 | 76 |
| 6 | Peugeot 308 Racing Cup | | | | | | | | | | | | | | | | | | | | | 9 | 8 | 2 | 2 | 56 |
| Pos. | Car | SPA‡ (Belgium) | | | | ZAN (Netherlands) | | | | ZOL (Belgium) | | | | GOO (Luxembourg) | | | | ASS (Netherlands) | | | | MET (Belgium) | | | | Pts. |

Notes

- ‡ – Half points were awarded in Race 4 at Spa-Francorchamps as less than 75% of the scheduled distance was completed due to heavy rain.
