= 2017 TCR BeNeLux Touring Car Championship =

Locations of the European racing circuits

The 2017 TCR Benelux Touring Car Championship was the second season of the Champions. The season started on 22 April at Zolder and ended on 22 October at Assen. Stéphane Lémeret entered the season as the defending champion.

== Teams and drivers ==
Michelin is the official tyre supplier.

=== TCR ===
| Team | Car | No. | Drivers | Status | Rounds |
|---|---|---|---|---|---|
| (Belgium) Boutsen Ginion Racing | Honda Civic TCR | 1 | (Belgium) Stéphane Lémeret | | 1–2 |
| (Belgium) Boutsen Ginion Racing | Honda Civic TCR | 1 | (Netherlands) Tom Coronel | | 1 |
| (Belgium) Boutsen Ginion Racing | Honda Civic TCR | 1 | (France) Aurélien Panis | | 2 |
| (Belgium) Boutsen Ginion Racing | Honda Civic TCR | 2 | (Belgium) Benjamin Lessennes | J | All |
| (Belgium) Boutsen Ginion Racing | Honda Civic TCR | 2 | (France) Enzo Guibbert | J | 1 |
| (Belgium) Boutsen Ginion Racing | Honda Civic TCR | 2 | (Netherlands) Tom Coronel | | 2–3, 6 |
| (Belgium) Boutsen Ginion Racing | Honda Civic TCR | 2 | (Belgium) Stéphane Lémeret | | 4–5 |
| (Belgium) Delahaye Racing | Volkswagen Golf GTI TCR | 4 | (Italy) Giacomo Altoè | J | 1–3, 5 |
| (Belgium) Delahaye Racing | Volkswagen Golf GTI TCR | 4 | (Belgium) Romain de Leval | J | 1 |
| (Belgium) Delahaye Racing | Volkswagen Golf GTI TCR | 4 | (Belgium) Guillaume Mondron | | 2, 4–6 |
| (Belgium) Delahaye Racing | Volkswagen Golf GTI TCR | 4 | (Belgium) Frédéric Caprasse | | 3 |
| (Belgium) Delahaye Racing | Volkswagen Golf GTI TCR | 4 | (Belgium) Lorenzo Donniacuo | | 4 |
| (Belgium) Delahaye Racing | Volkswagen Golf GTI TCR | 4 | (Belgium) Edouard Mondron | | 6 |
| (Belgium) Delahaye Racing | SEAT León TCR | 5 | (Belgium) Edouard Mondron | | 1, 3 |
| (Belgium) Delahaye Racing | SEAT León TCR | 5 | (Belgium) Guillaume Mondron | | 1, 3 |
| (Netherlands) Ferry Monster Autosport | SEAT León TCR | 6 | (Netherlands) Danny Kroes | J | 2 |
| (Netherlands) Ferry Monster Autosport | SEAT León TCR | 6 | (Spain) Pepe Oriola | | 2 |
| (Belgium) Team WRT | SEAT León TCR | 7 | (Belgium) Sam Dejonghe | | All |
| (Belgium) Team WRT | SEAT León TCR | 7 | (Belgium) Denis Dupont | | All |
| (Belgium) Team WRT | Volkswagen Golf GTI TCR | 25 | (France) Jean-Karl Vernay | | 1 |
| (Belgium) Team WRT | Volkswagen Golf GTI TCR | 25 | (United Kingdom) Robert Huff | | 1 |
| (Belgium) Team WRT | Volkswagen Golf GTI TCR | 52 | (Belgium) Maxime Potty | J | All |
| (Belgium) Team WRT | Volkswagen Golf GTI TCR | 52 | (Belgium) Mathieu Detry | J | All |
| (Belgium) DG Sport Compétition | Peugeot 308 Racing Cup | 8 | (France) Aurélien Comte | | All |
| (Belgium) DG Sport Compétition | Peugeot 308 Racing Cup | 8 | (Netherlands) Kevin Abbring | | All |
| DG Sport Opel Team Belgium | Opel Astra TCR | 21 | (Slovakia) Maťo Homola | | 1 |
| DG Sport Opel Team Belgium | Opel Astra TCR | 21 | (Belgium) Frédéric Caprasse | | 1 |
| (Netherlands) Certainty Racing Team | Audi RS 3 LMS TCR | 9 | (Netherlands) Dillon Koster | | 2 |
| (Netherlands) Certainty Racing Team | Audi RS 3 LMS TCR | 9 | (Netherlands) Bernhard van Oranje | | 2 |
| (Netherlands) Certainty Racing Team | Audi RS 3 LMS TCR | 54 | (Austria) Simon Reicher | J | 2 |
| (Netherlands) Certainty Racing Team | Audi RS 3 LMS TCR | 54 | (Netherlands) Jaap van Lagen | | 2 |
| (Belgium) Comtoyou Racing | Audi RS 3 LMS TCR | 12 | (Switzerland) Stefano Comini | | 1, 3 |
| (Belgium) Comtoyou Racing | Audi RS 3 LMS TCR | 12 | (South Africa) Sheldon van der Linde | J | 1 |
| (Belgium) Comtoyou Racing | Audi RS 3 LMS TCR | 12 | (Belgium) Frédéric Vervisch | | 3 |
| (Belgium) Milo Racing | Volkswagen Golf GTI TCR | 20 | (Belgium) Pierre-Yves Corthals | | 1 |
| (Belgium) Milo Racing | Volkswagen Golf GTI TCR | 20 | (Belgium) Armand Fumal | | 1 |
| (Netherlands) Bas Koeten Racing | Audi RS 3 LMS TCR | 56 | (Netherlands) Willem Meyer | J | 1–4, 6 |
| (Netherlands) Bas Koeten Racing | Audi RS 3 LMS TCR | 56 | (Netherlands) Paul Sieljes | | 1–3, 6 |
| (Netherlands) Bas Koeten Racing | Audi RS 3 LMS TCR | 56 | (Netherlands) Meindert van Buuren | | 4 |
| (Netherlands) Bas Koeten Racing | Audi RS 3 LMS TCR | 56 | (Belgium) Lorenzo Donniacuo | | 5 |
| (Netherlands) Bas Koeten Racing | Audi RS 3 LMS TCR | 56 | (Belgium) Alexis van de Poele | | 5 |
| (Netherlands) Bas Koeten Racing | Audi RS 3 LMS TCR | 66 | (Netherlands) Mika Morien | J | 1, 3–6 |
| (Netherlands) Bas Koeten Racing | Audi RS 3 LMS TCR | 66 | (Netherlands) Stan van Oord | J | 1, 3–4 |
| (Netherlands) Bas Koeten Racing | Audi RS 3 LMS TCR | 66 | (Netherlands) Willem Meyer | J | 5 |
| (Netherlands) Bas Koeten Racing | Audi RS 3 LMS TCR | 66 | (Netherlands) Rik Breukers | | 6 |
| (Netherlands) Bas Koeten Racing | SEAT León TCR | 99 | (Netherlands) Simon Knap | | 2 |
| (Netherlands) Bas Koeten Racing | SEAT León TCR | 99 | (Netherlands) Rob Severs | | 2 |
| (Belgium) DK Racing | Volkswagen Golf GTI TCR | 64 | (Belgium) Jonas de Kimpe | | 4–5 |

| Icon | Legend |
|---|---|
| J | Junior |

=== S2 (Clio Cup Benelux) ===
| Team | Car | No. | Drivers | Rounds |
|---|---|---|---|---|
| (Belgium) Team Duindistel | Clio Renaultsport 200 Turbo EDC | 104 | (Belgium) Gregory Eyckmans | 4 |
| (Belgium) Team Duindistel | Clio Renaultsport 200 Turbo EDC | 104 | Christoff Cox | 4 |
| Netherlands Koeten Racing | Clio Renaultsport 200 Turbo EDC | 111 | (Belgium) Sven van Laere | 1–4 |
| Netherlands Koeten Racing | Clio Renaultsport 200 Turbo EDC | 111 | (Belgium) Thomas Piessens | 1–2 |
| Netherlands Koeten Racing | Clio Renaultsport 200 Turbo EDC | 111 | (Belgium) Maarten Mus | 4 |
| (United Kingdom) MRM Racing | Clio Renaultsport 200 Turbo EDC | 112 | (United Kingdom) Brett Lidsey | 1–2 |
| (Belgium) Renault Oudenaarde | Clio Renaultsport 200 Turbo EDC | 196 | (Belgium) Filip Uyttendaele | 1–3 |
| (Belgium) Renault Oudenaarde | Clio Renaultsport 200 Turbo EDC | 196 | (Belgium) Gregory Eyckmans | 1–3 |

== Calendar and results ==
The 2017 schedule again consists of six rounds in the Benelux region, across Belgium and Netherlands. The round held in Luxembourg at the Circuit Goodyear did not return. Each round includes a qualifying session and five races: a 60-minute-long qualifying race with a mandatory driver change, and four 20-minute-long sprint races. The starting grid for the qualifying race will no longer be established by a popular vote via Facebook, through the Making the Grid application. But will be determined by a traditional qualifying session. Race 1 uses the fastest lap of after the pit stop during the qualifying race to determine the starting grid. Race 3 uses the fastest lap of before the pit stop during qualifying race. Races 2 and 4 include a rolling start using the finishing order, respectively, of Race 1 and 3. The calendar was announced on 25 September 2016, then revised on 15 December 2016.

All races will be run together with Clio Cup Benelux in separate classifications. Rounds 2, 4 and 6 are co-headlined by the GT & Prototype Challenge.

| Rnd. | Race | Circuit | Date | Pole position | Fastest lap | Winning driver | Winning team | Supporting |
|---|---|---|---|---|---|---|---|---|
| 1 | QR | (Belgium) Circuit de Spa-Francorchamps, Francorchamps | 22 April | (Slovakia) Maťo Homola (Belgium) Frédéric Caprasse | (Slovakia) Maťo Homola (Belgium) Frédéric Caprasse | (Belgium) Edouard Mondron (Belgium) Guillaume Mondron | (Belgium) Delahaye Racing | TCR Benelux Trophy |
| 1 | R1 | (Belgium) Circuit de Spa-Francorchamps, Francorchamps | 23 April | (Belgium) Frédéric Caprasse | (Belgium) Benjamin Lessennes | (Switzerland) Stefano Comini | (Belgium) Comtoyou Racing | TCR Benelux Trophy |
| 1 | R2 | (Belgium) Circuit de Spa-Francorchamps, Francorchamps | 23 April | | (Belgium) Frédéric Caprasse | (Switzerland) Stefano Comini | (Belgium) Comtoyou Racing | TCR Benelux Trophy |
| 1 | R3 | (Belgium) Circuit de Spa-Francorchamps, Francorchamps | 23 April | (Slovakia) Maťo Homola | (South Africa) Sheldon van der Linde | (Slovakia) Maťo Homola | (Belgium) DG Sport Compétition | TCR Benelux Trophy |
| 1 | R4 | (Belgium) Circuit de Spa-Francorchamps, Francorchamps | 23 April | | (Belgium) Maxime Potty | (South Africa) Sheldon van der Linde | (Belgium) Comtoyou Racing | TCR Benelux Trophy |
| 2 | QR | (Netherlands) Circuit Park Zandvoort, Zandvoort | 20 May | (Belgium) Maxime Potty (Belgium) Mathieu Detry | (Belgium) Stéphane Lémeret (France) Aurélien Panis | (Belgium) Guillaume Mondron (Italy) Giacomo Altoè | (Belgium) Delahaye Racing | Race Festival/Family Days |
| 2 | R1 | (Netherlands) Circuit Park Zandvoort, Zandvoort | 21 May | (Belgium) Stéphane Lémeret | (Italy) Giacomo Altoè | (Belgium) Stéphane Lémeret | (Belgium) Boutsen Ginion Racing | Race Festival/Family Days |
| 2 | R2 | (Netherlands) Circuit Park Zandvoort, Zandvoort | 21 May | | (Italy) Giacomo Altoè | (Italy) Giacomo Altoè | (Belgium) Delahaye Racing | Race Festival/Family Days |
| 2 | R3 | (Netherlands) Circuit Park Zandvoort, Zandvoort | 21 May | (Netherlands) Jaap van Lagen | (Netherlands) Jaap van Lagen | (Netherlands) Jaap van Lagen | (Netherlands) Certainty Racing Team | Race Festival/Family Days |
| 2 | R4 | (Netherlands) Circuit Park Zandvoort, Zandvoort | 21 May | | (Netherlands) Jaap van Lagen | (Netherlands) Jaap van Lagen | (Netherlands) Certainty Racing Team | Race Festival/Family Days |
| 3 | QR | (Belgium) Circuit Zolder, Heusden-Zolder | 3 June | (Belgium) Maxime Potty (Belgium) Mathieu Detry | (Belgium) Benjamin Lessennes (Netherlands) Tom Coronel | (Belgium) Benjamin Lessennes (Netherlands) Tom Coronel | (Belgium) Boutsen Ginion Racing | New Race Festival |
| 3 | R1 | (Belgium) Circuit Zolder, Heusden-Zolder | 4 June | (Netherlands) Tom Coronel | (Netherlands) Tom Coronel | (Netherlands) Tom Coronel | (Belgium) Boutsen Ginion Racing | New Race Festival |
| 3 | R2 | (Belgium) Circuit Zolder, Heusden-Zolder | 4 June | | (Belgium) Maxime Potty | (Netherlands) Tom Coronel | (Belgium) Boutsen Ginion Racing | New Race Festival |
| 3 | R3 | (Belgium) Circuit Zolder, Heusden-Zolder | 4 June | (Belgium) Benjamin Lessennes | (Belgium) Benjamin Lessennes | (Belgium) Benjamin Lessennes | (Belgium) Boutsen Ginion Racing | New Race Festival |
| 3 | R4 | (Belgium) Circuit Zolder, Heusden-Zolder | 4 June | | (Belgium) Mathieu Detry | (Belgium) Benjamin Lessennes | (Belgium) Boutsen Ginion Racing | New Race Festival |
| 4 | QR | (Belgium) Circuit Zolder, Heusden-Zolder | 15 July | (Belgium) Sam Dejonghe (Belgium) Denis Dupont | (Belgium) Maxime Potty (Belgium) Mathieu Detry | (Belgium) Sam Dejonghe (Belgium) Denis Dupont | (Belgium) Team WRT | Zolder Superprix |
| 4 | R1 | (Belgium) Circuit Zolder, Heusden-Zolder | 16 July | (Belgium) Jonas de Kimpe | (Belgium) Edouard Mondron | (Belgium) Mathieu Detry | (Belgium) Team WRT | Zolder Superprix |
| 4 | R2 | (Belgium) Circuit Zolder, Heusden-Zolder | 16 July | | (Belgium) Denis Dupont | (Belgium) Mathieu Detry | (Belgium) Team WRT | Zolder Superprix |
| 4 | R3 | (Belgium) Circuit Zolder, Heusden-Zolder | 16 July | (Belgium) Maxime Potty | (France) Aurélien Comte | (France) Aurélien Comte | (Belgium) DG Sport Compétition | Zolder Superprix |
| 4 | R4 | (Belgium) Circuit Zolder, Heusden-Zolder | 16 July | | (Belgium) Lorenzo Donniacuo | (France) Aurélien Comte | (Belgium) DG Sport Compétition | Zolder Superprix |
| 5 | QR | (Belgium) Circuit Jules Tacheny Mettet, Mettet | 23–24 September | (Belgium) Stéphane Lémeret (Belgium) Benjamin Lessennes | (France) Aurélien Comte (Netherlands) Kevin Abbring | (France) Aurélien Comte (Netherlands) Kevin Abbring | (Belgium) DG Sport Compétition | Kronos 10 hours of Mettet |
| 5 | R1 | (Belgium) Circuit Jules Tacheny Mettet, Mettet | 23–24 September | (Belgium) Lorenzo Donniacuo | (Belgium) Stéphane Lémeret | (Belgium) Lorenzo Donniacuo | (Netherlands) Bas Koeten Racing | Kronos 10 hours of Mettet |
| 5 | R2 | (Belgium) Circuit Jules Tacheny Mettet, Mettet | 23–24 September | | (Netherlands) Kevin Abbring | (Netherlands) Kevin Abbring | (Belgium) DG Sport Compétition | Kronos 10 hours of Mettet |
| 5 | R3 | (Belgium) Circuit Jules Tacheny Mettet, Mettet | 23–24 September | (France) Aurélien Comte | (Belgium) Benjamin Lessennes | (Belgium) Benjamin Lessennes | (Belgium) Boutsen Ginion Racing | Kronos 10 hours of Mettet |
| 5 | R4 | (Belgium) Circuit Jules Tacheny Mettet, Mettet | 23–24 September | | (France) Aurélien Comte | (Belgium) Benjamin Lessennes | (Belgium) Boutsen Ginion Racing | Kronos 10 hours of Mettet |
| 6 | QR | (Netherlands) TT Circuit Assen, Assen | 21–22 October | (Belgium) Edouard Mondron (Belgium) Guillaume Mondron | (Netherlands) Mika Morien (Netherlands) Rik Breukers | (Netherlands) Willem Meyer (Netherlands) Paul Sieljes | (Netherlands) Bas Koeten Racing | Formido Finale Races |
| 6 | R1 | (Netherlands) TT Circuit Assen, Assen | 21–22 October | (Belgium) Mathieu Detry | (Netherlands) Willem Meyer | (Belgium) Sam Dejonghe | (Belgium) Team WRT | Formido Finale Races |
| 6 | R2 | (Netherlands) TT Circuit Assen, Assen | 21–22 October | | (Belgium) Mathieu Detry | (Belgium) Sam Dejonghe | (Belgium) Team WRT | Formido Finale Races |
| 6 | R3 | (Netherlands) TT Circuit Assen, Assen | 21–22 October | (Netherlands) Rik Breukers | (Netherlands) Paul Sieljes | (Belgium) Denis Dupont | (Belgium) Team WRT | Formido Finale Races |
| 6 | R4 | (Netherlands) TT Circuit Assen, Assen | 21–22 October | | (Belgium) Maxime Potty | (Belgium) Maxime Potty | (Belgium) Team WRT | Formido Finale Races |

=== Drivers' championships ===
In sprint races both the competing driver and the co-driver that is not competing score points.

| Pos. | Driver | SPA (Belgium) | | | | | ZAN (Netherlands) | | | | | ZOL (Belgium) | | | | | ZOL (Belgium) | | | | | MET (Belgium) | | | | | ASS (Netherlands) | | | | | Pts. |
| Pos. | Driver | QR | R1 | R2 | R3 | R4 | QR | R1 | R2 | R3 | R4 | QR | R1 | R2 | R3 | R4 | QR | R1 | R2 | R3 | R4 | QR | R1 | R2 | R3 | R4 | QR | R1 | R2 | R3 | R4 | Pts. |
|---|---|---|---|---|---|---|---|---|---|---|---|---|---|---|---|---|---|---|---|---|---|---|---|---|---|---|---|---|---|---|---|---|
| 1 | (Belgium) Benjamin Lessennes | 3 | 2 | 3 | | | 10 | 3 | 2 | | | 1 | | | 1 | 1 | 7 | | | 3 | 8 | Ret | | | 1 | 1 | 5 | | | 6 | 5 | 420 |
| 2 | (Belgium) Guillaume Mondron | 1 | 5 | 5 | | | 1 | | | 7 | 5 | 5 | 5 | 6 | | | 3 | 2 | 2 | | | 5 | | | 6 | 5 | 6 | | | 4 | 4 | 402 |
| 3 | (Belgium) Maxime Potty | 5 | | | Ret | 2 | 9 | | | 7 | Ret | 2 | 2 | 2 | | | 2 | | | 2 | 2 | 3 | | | 4 | 3 | 2 | | | Ret | 1 | 380 |
| 3 | (Belgium) Mathieu Detry | 5 | 9 | 6 | | | 9 | 4 | 3 | | | 2 | | | 6 | 4 | 2 | 1 | 1 | | | 3 | 6 | 4 | | | 2 | 7 | 2 | | | 380 |
| 4 | (France) Aurélien Comte | 6 | | | 7 | 7 | 2 | | | 3 | 2 | 4 | | | 5 | 2 | Ret | | | 1 | 1 | 1 | | | 2 | 2 | DNS | | | 5 | 3 | 375 |
| 4 | (Netherlands) Kevin Abbring | 6 | 10 | Ret | | | 2 | 5 | 4 | | | 4 | 4 | 3 | | | Ret | 4 | 3 | | | 1 | 4 | 1 | | | DNS | 6 | 7 | | | 375 |
| 5 | (Belgium) Denis Dupont | Ret | | | 13 | 6 | 8 | 8 | 6 | | | 3 | | | 2 | 7 | 1 | Ret | 6 | | | 2 | | | 5 | 4 | 3 | | | 1 | 6 | 316 |
| 5 | (Belgium) Sam Dejonghe | Ret | 6 | Ret | | | 8 | | | 10 | 7 | 3 | 3 | 4 | | | 1 | | | 4 | 4 | 2 | 3 | Ret | | | 3 | 1 | 1 | | | 316 |
| 6 | (Netherlands) Tom Coronel | 2 | | | Ret | Ret | 10 | | | 2 | Ret | 1 | 1 | 1 | | | | | | | | | | | | | 5 | 3 | 3 | | | 253 |
| 7 | (Netherlands) Mika Morien | 8 | | | 14 | 10 | 6 | | | 5 | 3 | 7 | 8 | 7 | | | 6 | | | 5 | 5 | 4 | | | 3 | Ret | 4 | 2 | 6 | | | 227 |
| 8 | (Netherlands) Willem Meyer | Ret | | | 6 | 5 | 7 | 10 | 10 | | | 6 | | | 9 | 5 | 4 | 6 | 5 | | | 4 | 8 | 7 | | | 1 | 5 | 4 | | | 209 |
| 9 | (Italy) Giacomo Altoè | 7 | 7 | 7 | | | 1 | 2 | 1 | | | Ret | DNS | 9 | | | | | | | | 5 | 2 | 2 | | | | | | | | 188 |
| 10 | (Belgium) Edouard Mondron | 1 | | | 4 | 4 | | | | | | 5 | | | 4 | 3 | | | | | | | | | | | 6 | 4 | 5 | | | 178 |
| 11 | (Belgium) Stéphane Lémeret | 2 | 12 | Ret | | | Ret | 1 | Ret | | | | | | | | 7 | 3 | 4 | | | Ret | 5 | 3 | | | | | | | | 175 |
| 12 | (Switzerland) Stefano Comini | 4 | 1 | 1 | | | | | | | | Ret | 6 | 5 | | | | | | | | | | | | | | | | | | 138 |
| 13 | (Netherlands) Paul Sieljes | Ret | 11 | 8 | | | 7 | | | 9 | 9 | 6 | 7 | 8 | | | | | | | | | | | | | 1 | | | 3 | Ret | 126 |
| 14 | (Belgium) Lorenzo Donniacuo | | | | | | | | | | | | | | | | 3 | | | 8 | 3 | 7 | 1 | 5 | | | | | | | | 117 |
| 15 | (Netherlands) Stan van Oord | 8 | 8 | Ret | | | 6 | 7 | 8 | | | 7 | | | 8 | 6 | 6 | 5 | Ret | | | | | | | | | | | | | 116 |
| 16 | (South Africa) Sheldon van der Linde | 4 | | | 2 | 1 | | | | | | | | | | | | | | | | | | | | | | | | | | 105 |
| 17 | (Netherlands) Rik Breukers | | | | | | | | | | | | | | | | | | | | | | | | | | 4 | | | 2 | 2 | 74 |
| 18 | (Belgium) Jonas de Kimpe | | | | | | | | | | | | | | | | 5 | 7 | 7 | 6 | 7 | 6 | 7 | 6 | 7 | 6 | | | | | | 72 |
| 19 | (Netherlands) Jaap van Lagen | | | | | | 3 | | | 1 | 1 | | | | | | | | | | | | | | | | | | | | | 67 |
| 19 | (Austria) Simon Reicher | | | | | | 3 | 9 | Ret | | | | | | | | | | | | | | | | | | | | | | | 67 |
| 20 | (France) Jean-Karl Vernay | 10 | 3 | 2 | | | | | | | | | | | | | | | | | | | | | | | | | | | | 64 |
| 20 | (United Kingdom) Robert Huff | 10 | | | 3 | 3 | | | | | | | | | | | | | | | | | | | | | | | | | | 64 |
| 21 | (Belgium) Frédéric Caprasse | 13 | 4 | 4 | | | | | | | | Ret | | | 7 | 8 | | | | | | | | | | | | | | | | 61 |
| 22 | (France) Enzo Guibbert | 3 | | | 5 | 11 | | | | | | | | | | | | | | | | | | | | | | | | | | 58 |
| 23 | (Spain) Pepe Oriola | | | | | | 4 | | | 6 | 4 | | | | | | | | | | | | | | | | | | | | | 50 |
| 23 | (Netherlands) Danny Kroes | | | | | | 4 | 6 | 5 | | | | | | | | | | | | | | | | | | | | | | | 50 |
| 24 | (Slovakia) Maťo Homola | 13 | | | 1 | Ret | | | | | | | | | | | | | | | | | | | | | | | | | | 49 |
| 25 | (Belgium) Alexis van de Poele | | | | | | | | | | | | | | | | | | | | | 7 | | | Ret | 7 | | | | | | 47 |
| 26 | (Netherlands) Meindert van Buuren | | | | | | | | | | | | | | | | 4 | | | 7 | 6 | | | | | | | | | | | 46 |
| 27 | (Belgium) Frédéric Vervisch | | | | | | | | | | | Ret | | | 3 | Ret | | | | | | | | | | | | | | | | 33 |
| 28 | (France) Aurélien Panis | | | | | | Ret | | | 8 | 10 | | | | | | | | | | | | | | | | | | | | | 30 |
| 29 | (Belgium) Romain de Leval | 7 | | | 9 | 9 | | | | | | | | | | | | | | | | | | | | | | | | | | 22 |
| 30 | (Netherlands) Dillon Koster | | | | | | 5 | | | 11 | 6 | | | | | | | | | | | | | | | | | | | | | 20 |
| 30 | (Netherlands) Bernhard van Oranje | | | | | | 5 | 16 | 9 | | | | | | | | | | | | | | | | | | | | | | | 20 |
| 31 | (Netherlands) Simon Knap | | | | | | 11 | | | 12 | 8 | | | | | | | | | | | | | | | | | | | | | 10 |
| 31 | (Netherlands) Rob Severs | | | | | | 11 | 11 | 7 | | | | | | | | | | | | | | | | | | | | | | | 10 |
| 32 | (Belgium) Pierre-Yves Corthals | 9 | | | 8 | 8 | | | | | | | | | | | | | | | | | | | | | | | | | | 10 |
| 32 | (Belgium) Armand Fumal | 9 | Ret | Ret | | | | | | | | | | | | | | | | | | | | | | | | | | | | 10 |
| Pos. | Driver | QR | R1 | R2 | R3 | R4 | QR | R1 | R2 | R3 | R4 | QR | R1 | R2 | R3 | R4 | QR | R1 | R2 | R3 | R4 | QR | R1 | R2 | R3 | R4 | QR | R1 | R2 | R3 | R4 | Pts. |
| Pos. | Driver | SPA (Belgium) | | | | | ZAN (Netherlands) | | | | | ZOL (Belgium) | | | | | ZOL (Belgium) | | | | | MET (Belgium) | | | | | ASS (Netherlands) | | | | | Pts. |

| Colour | Result |
|---|---|
| Gold | Winner |
| Silver | Second place |
| Bronze | Third place |
| Green | Points classification |
| Blue | Non-points classification |
| Blue | Non-classified finish (NC) |
| Purple | Retired, not classified (Ret) |
| Red | Did not qualify (DNQ) |
| Red | Did not pre-qualify (DNPQ) |
| Black | Disqualified (DSQ) |
| White | Did not start (DNS) |
| White | Withdrew (WD) |
| White | Race cancelled (C) |
| Blank | Did not practice (DNP) |
| Blank | Did not arrive (DNA) |
| Blank | Excluded (EX) |

**Bold** – Pole
Italics – Fastest Lap

==== Junior class ====
In contrast to the overall Drivers' championship only the driver competing scores points in sprint races.

| Pos. | Driver | SPA (Belgium) | | | | | ZAN (Netherlands) | | | | | ZOL (Belgium) | | | | | ZOL (Belgium) | | | | | MET (Belgium) | | | | | ASS (Netherlands) | | | | | Pts. |
| Pos. | Driver | QR | R1 | R2 | R3 | R4 | QR | R1 | R2 | R3 | R4 | QR | R1 | R2 | R3 | R4 | QR | R1 | R2 | R3 | R4 | QR | R1 | R2 | R3 | R4 | QR | R1 | R2 | R3 | R4 | Pts. |
|---|---|---|---|---|---|---|---|---|---|---|---|---|---|---|---|---|---|---|---|---|---|---|---|---|---|---|---|---|---|---|---|---|
| 1 | (Belgium) Benjamin Lessennes | 3 | 2 | 3 | | | 10 | 3 | 2 | | | 1 | | | 1 | 1 | 7 | | | 3 | 8 | Ret | | | | | | | | | | 180 |
| 2 | (Belgium) Mathieu Detry | 5 | 9 | 6 | | | 9 | 4 | 3 | | | 2 | | | 6 | 4 | 2 | 1 | 1 | | | 3 | | | | | 2 | | | | | 155 |
| 3 | (Belgium) Maxime Potty | 5 | | | Ret | 2 | 9 | | | 7 | Ret | 2 | 2 | 2 | | | 2 | | | 2 | 2 | 3 | | | | | 2 | | | | | 154 |
| 4 | (Italy) Giacomo Altoè | 7 | 7 | 7 | | | 1 | 2 | 1 | | | Ret | DNS | 9 | | | | | | | | | | | | | | | | | | 90 |
| 5 | (Netherlands) Mika Morien | 8 | | | 14 | 10 | 6 | | | 5 | 3 | 7 | 8 | 7 | | | 6 | | | 5 | 5 | 4 | | | | | | | | | | 82 |
| 6 | (Netherlands) Willem Meyer | Ret | | | 6 | 5 | 7 | 10 | 10 | | | 6 | | | 9 | 5 | 4 | 6 | 5 | | | 4 | | | | | | | | | | 76 |
| 7 | (Netherlands) Stan van Oord | 8 | 8 | Ret | | | 6 | 7 | 8 | | | 7 | | | 8 | 6 | 6 | 5 | Ret | | | | | | | | | | | | | 62 |
| 8 | (South Africa) Sheldon van der Linde | 4 | | | 2 | 1 | | | | | | | | | | | | | | | | | | | | | | | | | | 55 |
| 9 | (Netherlands) Danny Kroes | | | | | | 4 | 6 | 5 | | | | | | | | | | | | | | | | | | | | | | | 30 |
| 10 | (France) Enzo Guibbert | 3 | | | 5 | 11 | | | | | | | | | | | | | | | | | | | | | | | | | | 25 |
| 11 | (Austria) Simon Reicher | | | | | | 3 | 9 | Ret | | | | | | | | | | | | | | | | | | | | | | | 17 |
| 12 | (Belgium) Romain de Leval | 7 | | | 9 | 9 | | | | | | | | | | | | | | | | | | | | | | | | | | 10 |
| Pos. | Driver | QR | R1 | R2 | R3 | R4 | QR | R1 | R2 | R3 | R4 | QR | R1 | R2 | R3 | R4 | QR | R1 | R2 | R3 | R4 | QR | R1 | R2 | R3 | R4 | QR | R1 | R2 | R3 | R4 | Pts. |
| Pos. | Driver | SPA (Belgium) | | | | | ZAN (Netherlands) | | | | | ZOL (Belgium) | | | | | ZOL (Belgium) | | | | | MET (Belgium) | | | | | ASS (Netherlands) | | | | | Pts. |

=== Teams' championship ===
Points toward the Teams' championship are only awarded in the qualifying race.

| Pos. | Team | SPA (Belgium) | ZAN (Netherlands) | ZOL (Belgium) | ZOL (Belgium) | MET (Belgium) | ASS (Netherlands) | Pts. |
|---|---|---|---|---|---|---|---|---|
| 1 | (Belgium) Delahaye Racing Team | 1 | 1 | 4 | 2 | 4 | 4 | 116 |
| 2 | (Belgium) Team WRT | 4 | 6 | 2 | 1 | 2 | 2 | 99 |
| 3 | (Netherlands) Bas Koeten Racing | 6 | 5 | 5 | 3 | 3 | 1 | 83 |
| 4 | (Belgium) Boutsen Ginion Racing | 2 | 7 | 1 | 5 | Ret | 3 | 74 |
| 5 | (Belgium) DG Sport Compétition | 5 | 2 | 3 | Ret | 1 | DNS | 68 |
| 6 | (Belgium) DK Racing | | | | 4 | 5 | | 22 |
| 7 | (Belgium) Comtoyou Racing | 3 | | Ret | | | | 15 |
| 8 | (Netherlands) Certainty Racing Team | | 3 | | | | | 15 |
| 9 | (Netherlands) Ferry Monster Autosport | | 4 | | | | | 12 |
| 10 | (Belgium) Milo Racing | 7 | | | | | | 6 |
| 11 | DG Sport Opel Team Belgium | 8 | | | | | | 4 |
| Pos. | Team | SPA (Belgium) | ZAN (Netherlands) | ZOL (Belgium) | ZOL (Belgium) | MET (Belgium) | ASS (Netherlands) | Pts. |

=== Cars' championship ===
Points toward the Cars' championship are only awarded in the sprint races.

| Pos. | Car | SPA (Belgium) | | | | ZAN (Netherlands) | | | | ZOL (Belgium) | | | | ZOL (Belgium) | | | | MET (Belgium) | | | | ASS (Netherlands) | | | | Pts. |
| Pos. | Car | RD1 | RD2 | RD3 | RD4 | RD1 | RD2 | RD3 | RD4 | RD1 | RD2 | RD3 | RD4 | RD1 | RD2 | RD3 | RD4 | RD1 | RD2 | RD3 | RD4 | RD1 | RD2 | RD3 | RD4 | Pts. |
|---|---|---|---|---|---|---|---|---|---|---|---|---|---|---|---|---|---|---|---|---|---|---|---|---|---|---|
| 1 | Volkswagen Golf GTI TCR | 3 | 2 | 3 | 2 | 2 | 1 | 4 | 4 | 2 | 2 | 5 | 4 | 1 | 1 | 2 | 2 | 2 | 2 | 4 | 3 | 4 | 2 | 3 | 1 | 416 |
| 2 | Honda Civic TCR | 2 | 3 | 5 | 5 | 1 | 2 | 2 | 5 | 1 | 1 | 1 | 1 | 2 | 3 | 3 | 5 | 5 | 3 | 1 | 1 | 3 | 3 | 5 | 4 | 399 |
| 3 | Audi RS3 LMS TCR | 1 | 1 | 2 | 1 | 5 | 5 | 1 | 1 | 5 | 5 | 3 | 5 | 4 | 4 | 5 | 4 | 1 | 4 | 3 | 5 | 2 | 4 | 2 | 2 | 379 |
| 4 | Peugeot 308 Racing Cup | 6 | Ret | 6 | 4 | 3 | 3 | 3 | 2 | 4 | 3 | 4 | 2 | 3 | 2 | 1 | 1 | 4 | 1 | 2 | 2 | 5 | 5 | 4 | 3 | 358 |
| 5 | SEAT León TCR | 5 | 5 | 4 | 3 | 4 | 4 | 5 | 3 | 3 | 4 | 2 | 3 | Ret | 5 | 4 | 3 | 3 | Ret | 5 | 4 | 1 | 1 | 1 | 5 | 305 |
| 6 | Opel Astra TCR | 4 | 4 | 1 | Ret | | | | | | | | | | | | | | | | | | | | | 49 |
| Pos. | Car | SPA (Belgium) | | | | ZAN (Netherlands) | | | | ZOL (Belgium) | | | | ZOL (Belgium) | | | | MET (Belgium) | | | | ASS (Netherlands) | | | | Pts. |
