= Boutsen Ginion Racing =

Belgian auto racing team

(Belgium) Boutsen Ginion Racing
- Founded: 1998
- Founder(s): Olivier Lainé; Thierry Boutsen
- Base: Wavre, Belgium
- Current series: GT World Challenge Europe Endurance Cup; Lamborghini Super Trofeo Europe
- Former series: Blancpain GT Series; European Le Mans Series; Eurocup Megane Trophy; World Touring Car Cup; TCR International Series
- Drivers' Championships: 2016 TCR Benelux Touring Car Championship (Lémeret)
- Website: https://boutsenracing.com/

Boutsen Ginion Racing is a Belgian auto racing team currently competing in the GT World Challenge Europe. The team has previously raced also in Blancpain GT Series, European Le Mans Series, Eurocup Megane Trophy, World Touring Car Cup and TCR Benelux Touring Car Championship.

== History ==
The team was formed in 1998 by Olivier Lainé. The team achieved success in various single-seater, touring car and GT competitions. In 2009 the team entered the Formula Le Mans Cup while competing in other series such as Eurocup Mégane Trophy. in 2011 the team enters European Le Mans Series in the LMP2 category. They've also entered Blancpain Endurance Series initially with McLaren MP4-12C GT3 and later BMW Z4 GT3 and BMW M6 GT3.

Former Formula One driver Thierry Boutsen, brother in law of Lainé, currently acts as team adviser.

== TCR Benelux Touring Car Championship ==
The team entered the inaugural season of TCR Benelux Touring Car Championship entering two full-time Honda Civic TCR. The first car was driven by Renaud Kuppens and Benjamin Lessennes while in the other car Stéphane Lémeret shared driving duties with drivers on race by race basis - Tiago Monteiro in Spa, Norbert Michelisz in Zandvoort, Assen and Mettet, Matt Neal in Zolder and Kris Richard in Colmar-Berg. Additionally the team entered the Civic art car first for Monteiro and Jean-Louis Dauger in Zandvoort and Tom Coronel and Michael Verhagen in Assen. Lémeret, who won the championship, returned for 2017 - this time partnered with Tom Coronel. Lessennes also returned with the team sharing the second car with Enzo Guibbert.

== TCR International Series ==
The team entered the 2017 TCR International Series Spa-Francorchamps round fielding two Honda Civic Type R TCR for Tom Coronel and Benjamin Lessennes. From Oschersleben onwards the team fields a single entry for Aurélien Panis.

== Racing record ==
=== 24 Hours of Le Mans results ===
| Year | Entrant | No. | Car | Drivers | Class | Laps | Pos. | Class Pos. |
|---|---|---|---|---|---|---|---|---|
| 2012 | (Belgium) Boutsen Ginion Racing | 45 | Oreca 03-Nissan | (France) Bastien Brière (Japan) Shinji Nakano (Germany) Jens Petersen | LMP2 | 325 | 24th | 10th |
| 2013 | (Belgium) Boutsen Ginion Racing | 40 | Oreca 03-Nissan | (France) Thomas Dagoneau (United States) Matt Downs (Germany) Rodin Younessi | LMP2 | 300 | 32nd | 11th |
