= Delahaye Racing =

Belgian motor racing team

(Belgium) Delahaye Racing
- Founded: 1999
- Team principal(s): Gilles Terlinden; Pierre Sevrin
- Current series: TCR International Series; TCR Benelux Series; Michelin Le Mans Cup; Volkswagen Fun Cup
- Former series: GT4 European Series; Blancpain Endurance Series; Supercar Challenge
- Noted drivers: TCR; 12. (Belgium) Guillaume Mondron; 25. (Belgium) Edouard Mondron; TCR Benelux; 4. (Belgium) Romain de Leval (Belgium) Guillaume Mondron (Italy) Giacomo Altoè; 5. (Belgium) Edouard Mondron (Belgium) Guillaume Mondron; Le Mans Cup; 28. (France) Pierre-Étienne Bordet (France) Alexandre Viron
- Website: http://www.delahaye-racing.com

Delahaye Racing is a Belgian auto racing team based in Wavre, Belgium. The team has raced in the TCR International Series, since 2017. The team also races in the TCR Benelux Touring Car Championship, Michelin Le Mans Cup and Volkswagen Fun Cup. Having previously raced in the Blancpain Endurance Series amongst others.

== Blancpain Endurance Series ==
The team entered the Blancpain Endurance Series for first time in 2011, entering the Spa 24 Hours with a Corvette Z06 GT3. But they retired from the race after completing 215 laps. With the team returning for a full season in 2013, with a Porsche 997 GT3-R. With the team finishing twenty-sixth in the Spa 24 Hours. They returned for the 2014 24 Hours of Spa, finishing thirty-third. In 2015 they again competed a full season, with the team finishing ninth in the Am Cup teams championship.

== TCR Benelux Touring Car Championship ==
Having first entered the championship in 2016, running a single SEAT León Cup Racer and two Volkswagen Golf GTI TCRs. The team finished fourth in the teams championship, while their drivers finished fourth, eighth and ninth in the drivers championship with drivers Edouard and Guillaume Mondron being the only duo of the three to take a victory. The team took fifteen podium finishes. They returned in 2017 running a SEAT León TCR for 2016 drivers Edouard and Guillaume Mondron and a Volkswagen Golf GTI TCR for 2016 driver Romain de Leval and Giacomo Altoè. However, for the second round of the championship, the team only fielded a single car with Guillaume Mondron joining Giacomo Altoè in the Golf.

== TCR International Series ==
=== SEAT León TCR & Volkswagen Golf GTI TCR (2017–) ===
After having raced in the TCR Benelux Touring Car Championship, the team entered the 2017 TCR International Series with Edouard Mondron and Guillaume Mondron driving a Volkswagen Golf GTI TCR and SEAT León TCR respectively. With Edouard taking two points scoring positions, a seventh and fourth-place finish in the two races at Spa-Francorchamps. With Guillaume failing to score any points after a crash in qualifying that meant he had to start from twenty-second position, he went on to finish nineteenth and twelfth.
