= Denis Dupont =

Belgian racing driver

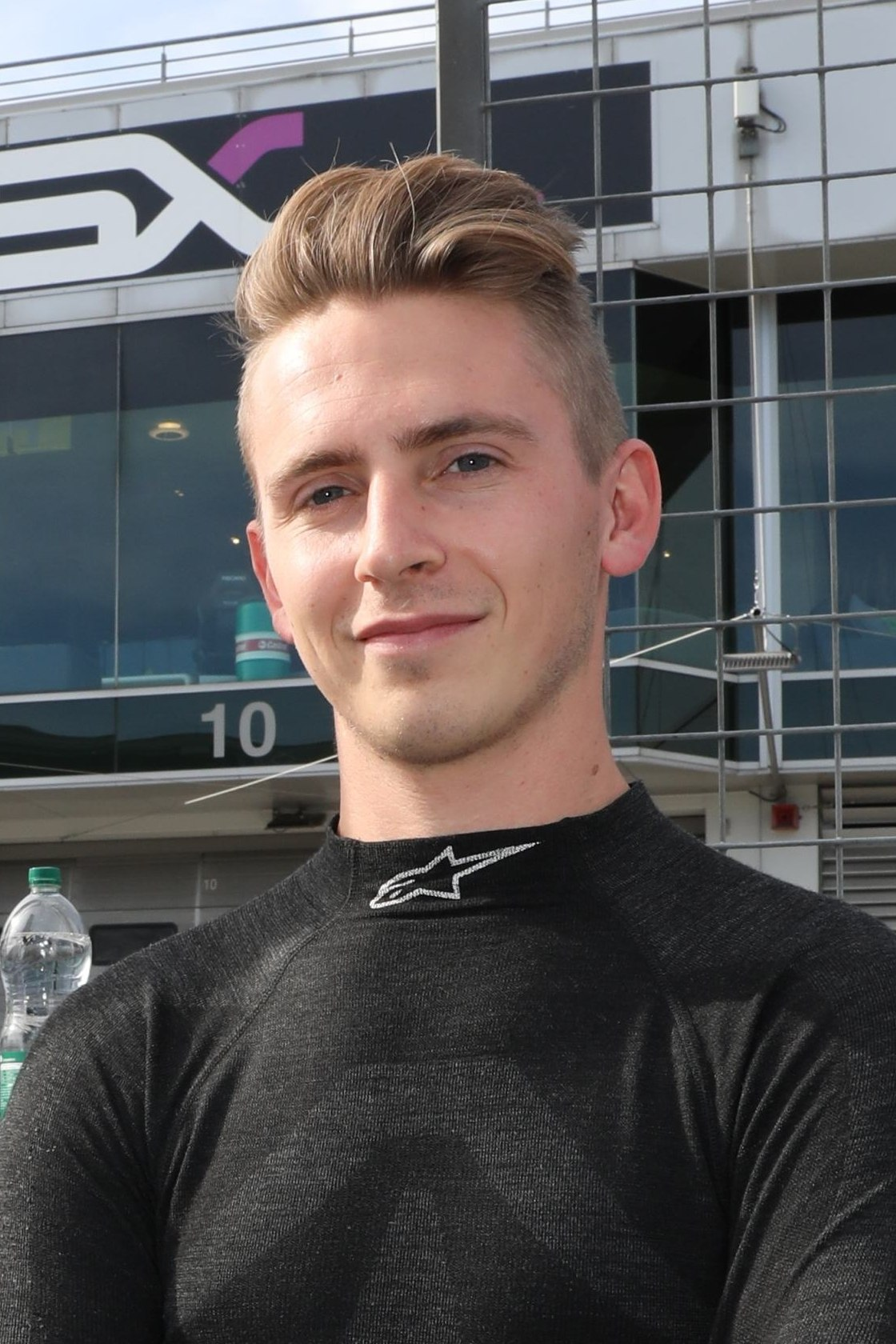
- Nationality: (Belgium) Belgian
- Born: 4 January 1993 (age 33) Braine-le-Château, Belgium

TCR International Series career
- Debut season: 2021
- Current team: Bryan Herta Autosport
- Categorisation: FIA Silver
- Car number: 19
- Former teams: Ombra Racing; WRT; Comtoyou Racing; Street Art Racing; 3Y Technology; Van Der Steur Racing
- Starts: +90
- Best finish: 1

Previous series
- WTCR Blancpain Endurance GT3 2017 2016-17 2014 2008-12: GT4 European Series Northern Cup; TCR BeNeLux Touring Car Championship; NASCAR Whelen Euro Series; Karting

Denis Dupont (born 4 January 1993) is a Belgian racing driver currently competing in the USA in Michelin Pilot Challenge in TCR. He previously raced in WTCR, TCR International Series, GT3 in Blancpain Sprint and Endurance championship, TCR BeNeLux Touring Car Championship, GT4 European Series Northern Cup and NASCAR Whelen Euro Series amongst others.

== Racing career ==
Dupont began his career in 2008 in Karting, he continued in karting until 2012. In 2014, he switched to the NASCAR Whelen Euro Series, he finished the season fifth in the Elite 2 class championship standings that year, having taken two victories. For 2016, he switched to the TCR BeNeLux Touring Car Championship, driving a SEAT León TCR for the Belgian RACB National Team partnering Sam Dejonghe. With the pair taking two victories. He continued in the series for 2017, again partnering Dejonghe. The pair having so far taken one victory. In 2017, he also took part in the GT4 European Series Northern Cup, partnering Jérôme Demay for the first three rounds. He scored a podium after leading his whole stint. He did not continue the season with the team and was replaced by Julien Darras.

In September 2017, it was announced that Dupont would race in the TCR International Series, driving an SEAT León TCR for Comtoyou Racing. He qualified third in Dubai but had bad luck during the races and suffered from punctures.

In February 2018, Dupont was confirmed as Comtoyou Racing's driver in an Audi RS3 LMS for 2018 WTCR campaign. He would score two podiums in the World championship that year.

In late 2022, it was announced Rockwell Autosport Development would be returning to the 2023 Michelin Pilot Challenge with a two car entry. Dupont was announced to drive the No. 15 car, With teammates Eric Rockwell and Nick Looijmans.

== Racing record ==
=== Career summary ===
| Season | Series | Team | Races | Wins | Poles | F/Laps | Podiums | Points | Position |
|---|---|---|---|---|---|---|---|---|---|
| 2014 | NASCAR Whelen Euro Series - Elite 2 | Racing Club Partners – Marc VDS | 11 | 2 | 2 | 3 | 4 | 561 | 4th |
| 2016 | TCR BeNeLux Touring Car Championship | RACB National Team | 16 | 2 | 0 | 0 | 5 | 314‡ | **3rd**‡ |
| 2017 | TCR BeNeLux Touring Car Championship | Team WRT | 18 | 2 | 1 | 1 | 6 | 316‡ | 5th‡ |
| 2017 | TCR International Series | Comtoyou Racing | 3 | 0 | 0 | 0 | 0 | 0 | NC |
| 2017 | GT4 European Series Northern Cup - Silver | Street Art Racing | 6 | 0 | 0 | 0 | 1 | 48 | 15th |
| 2018 | Blancpain GT Series Sprint Cup | 3Y Technology | 2 | 0 | 0 | 0 | 0 | 0 | NC |
| 2018 | World Touring Car Cup | Audi Sport Team Comtoyou | 28 | 0 | 0 | 0 | 2 | 69 | 16th |
| 2019 | Blancpain GT Series Endurance Cup | Ombra Racing | 3 | 0 | 0 | 0 | 0 | 0 | NC |
| 2019 | 24 Hours of Nürburgring - AT | Team Care For Climate | 1 | 0 | 0 | 0 | 0 | N/A | DNF |
| 2021 | Michelin Pilot Challenge - TCR | Van Der Steur Racing LLC | 9 | 0 | 0 | 1 | 1 | 2030 | 13th |
| 2022 | Michelin Pilot Challenge - TCR | Belgard & Techniseal Racing | 8 | 0 | 0 | 3 | 1 | 1920 | 14th |
| 2023 | Michelin Pilot Challenge - TCR | Rockwell Autosport Development | 10 | 0 | 0 | 0 | 0 | 2210 | 10th |
| 2023 | IMSA VP Racing SportsCar Challenge - LMP3 | Mühlner Motorsports America | 2 | 0 | 0 | 0 | 1 | 580 | 13th |
| 2024 | Michelin Pilot Challenge - TCR | Bryan Herta Autosport with Curb-Agajanian | 10 | 1 | 0 | 2 | 5 | 2730 | 4th |
| 2025 | Michelin Pilot Challenge - TCR | Bryan Herta Autosport with Curb-Agajanian | | | | | | | |
| 2026 | Michelin Pilot Challenge - TCR | Bryan Herta Autosport with PR1/Mathiasen | | | | | | | |

‡ Team Standings

=== Complete TCR International Series results ===
(key) (Races in bold indicate pole position) (Races in italics indicate fastest lap)

| Year | Team | Car | 1 | 2 | 3 | 4 | 5 | 6 | 7 | 8 | 9 | 10 | 11 | 12 | 13 | 14 | 15 | 16 | 17 | 18 | 19 | 20 | DC | Points |
|---|---|---|---|---|---|---|---|---|---|---|---|---|---|---|---|---|---|---|---|---|---|---|---|---|
| 2017 | Comtoyou Racing | SEAT León TCR | RIM; 1 | RIM; 2 | BHR; 1 | BHR; 2 | SPA; 1 | SPA; 2 | MNZ; 1 | MNZ; 2 | SAL; 1 | SAL; 2 | HUN; 1 | HUN; 2 | OSC; 1 | OSC; 2 | CHA; 1 | CHA; 2 | CHN; 1 Ret | CHN; 2 DNS | DUB; 1 Ret | DUB; 2; 17† | NC | 0 |

^{†} Driver did not finish the race, but was classified as he completed over 90% of the race distance.

=== 24 Hours of Zolder results ===
| Year | Team | Co-Drivers | Car | Class | Laps | Pos. | Class Pos. |
|---|---|---|---|---|---|---|---|
| 2017 | Belgium Driver Academy vzw | (Belgium) Maxim Pampel (Belgium) Pierre-Yves Rosoux (Belgium) Marnik Battryn (Belgium) Christophe Pampel (Belgium) Vincent Radermecker | Wolf GB08 | 2 | 776 | 6th | 4th |

=== Complete World Touring Car Cup results ===
(key) (Races in bold indicate pole position) (Races in italics indicate fastest lap)

| Year | Team | Car | 1 | 2 | 3 | 4 | 5 | 6 | 7 | 8 | 9 | 10 | 11 | 12 | 13 | 14 | 15 | 16 | 17 | 18 | 19 | 20 | 21 | 22 | 23 | 24 | 25 | 26 | 27 | 28 | 29 | 30 | DC | Points |
|---|---|---|---|---|---|---|---|---|---|---|---|---|---|---|---|---|---|---|---|---|---|---|---|---|---|---|---|---|---|---|---|---|---|---|
| 2018 | Audi Sport Team Comtoyou | Audi RS 3 LMS TCR | MAR; 1; 13 | MAR; 2 DNS | MAR; 3 DNS | HUN; 1; 22 | HUN; 2; 21 | HUN; 3; 21 | GER; 1; 12 | GER; 2; 11 | GER; 3; 12 | NED; 1; 11 | NED; 2; 11 | NED; 3; 12 | POR; 1 Ret | POR; 2 Ret | POR; 3; 14 | SVK; 1; 8 | SVK; 2; 17 | SVK; 3; 15† | CHN; 1; 9 | CHN; 2; 4 | CHN; 3; 3 | WUH; 1; 10 | WUH; 2; 8 | WUH; 3; 3 | JPN; 1; 16 | JPN; 2; 13 | JPN; 3 Ret | MAC; 1; 22 | MAC; 2; 15 | MAC; 3; 15 | 16th | 69 |

^{†} Driver did not finish the race, but was classified as he completed over 90% of the race distance.

=== NASCAR ===
(key) Bold - Pole position awarded by fastest qualifying time (in Race 1) or by previous race's fastest lap (in Race 2). Italics - Fastest lap. * – Most laps led. ^ – Most positions gained.

==== Whelen Euro Series - Elite 2 ====
NASCAR Whelen Euro Series - Elite 2 results
| Year | Team | No. | Make | 1 | 2 | 3 | 4 | 5 | 6 | 7 | 8 | 9 | 10 | 11 | 12 | NWES | Points |
|---|---|---|---|---|---|---|---|---|---|---|---|---|---|---|---|---|---|
| 2014 | Racing Club Partners – Marc VDS | 32 | Toyota | VAL; 10 | VAL; DNS | BRH; 2 | BRH; 22 | TOU; 1* | **TOU**; 1* | NUR; 20 | NUR; 18 | UMB; 8 | UMB; 18 | BUG; 8 | **BUG**; 3 | 5th | 561 |
