= Guillaume Mondron =

Belgian racing driver (born 1993)

- Nationality: Belgian
- Born: Guillaume Bernard Alain Mondron; 28 July 1993 (age 33) Brussels, Belgium
- Relatives: Edouard Mondron (brother)

TCR International Series career
- Debut season: 2017
- Current team: Delahaye Racing
- Car number: 12
- Starts: 2

Previous series
- 2016-17 2015 2014-15 2013-15: TCR Benelux Touring Car Championship; SEAT León Eurocup; European VW FunCup; Belgian Racing Car Championship

Championship titles
- 2015 2015: European VW FunCup; Belgian Racing Car Championship

Guillaume Bernard Alain Mondron (born 28 July 1993) is a Belgian racing driver currently competing in the TCR International Series and TCR Benelux Touring Car Championship. He has previously competed in the European VW FunCup and Belgian Racing Car Championship.

== Racing career ==
Mondron began his career in 2013 in the Belgian Racing Car Championship. He continued in the series up until 2015, winning the title that year. He switched to the European VW FunCup in 2014, where he finished second in his first season. He stayed there for the 2015 season, winning the championship title that year. For 2015 he made his SEAT León Eurocup debut, however, he only took part in two weekends across the season. In 2016, he made the switch to the TCR Benelux Touring Car Championship, teaming up with his brother Edouard. The pair finished the season eighth in the standings after one victory and three podiums. The pair returned to the series again in 2017, taking a victory in first qualifying race of the season at Spa-Francorchamps.

In April 2017, it was announced that Mondron would race in the TCR International Series, driving a SEAT León TCR for Delahaye Racing.

== Racing record ==
=== Complete TCR International Series results ===
(key) (Races in bold indicate pole position) (Races in italics indicate fastest lap)

Year	Team	Car	1	2	3	4	5	6	7	8	9	10	11	12	13	14	15	16	17	18	19	20	DC	Points
2017	Delahaye Racing	SEAT León TCR	GEO; 1	GEO; 2	BHR; 1	BHR; 2	BEL; 1; 19	BEL; 2; 12	ITA; 1	ITA; 2	AUT; 1	AUT; 2	HUN; 1	HUN; 2	GER; 1	GER; 2	THA; 1	THA; 2	CHN; 1	CHN; 2	ABU; 1	ABU; 2	NC*	0*

^{†} Driver did not finish the race, but was classified as he completed over 90% of the race distance.
^{*} Season still in progress.
