= Benjamin Lessennes =

Belgian racing driver (born 1999)

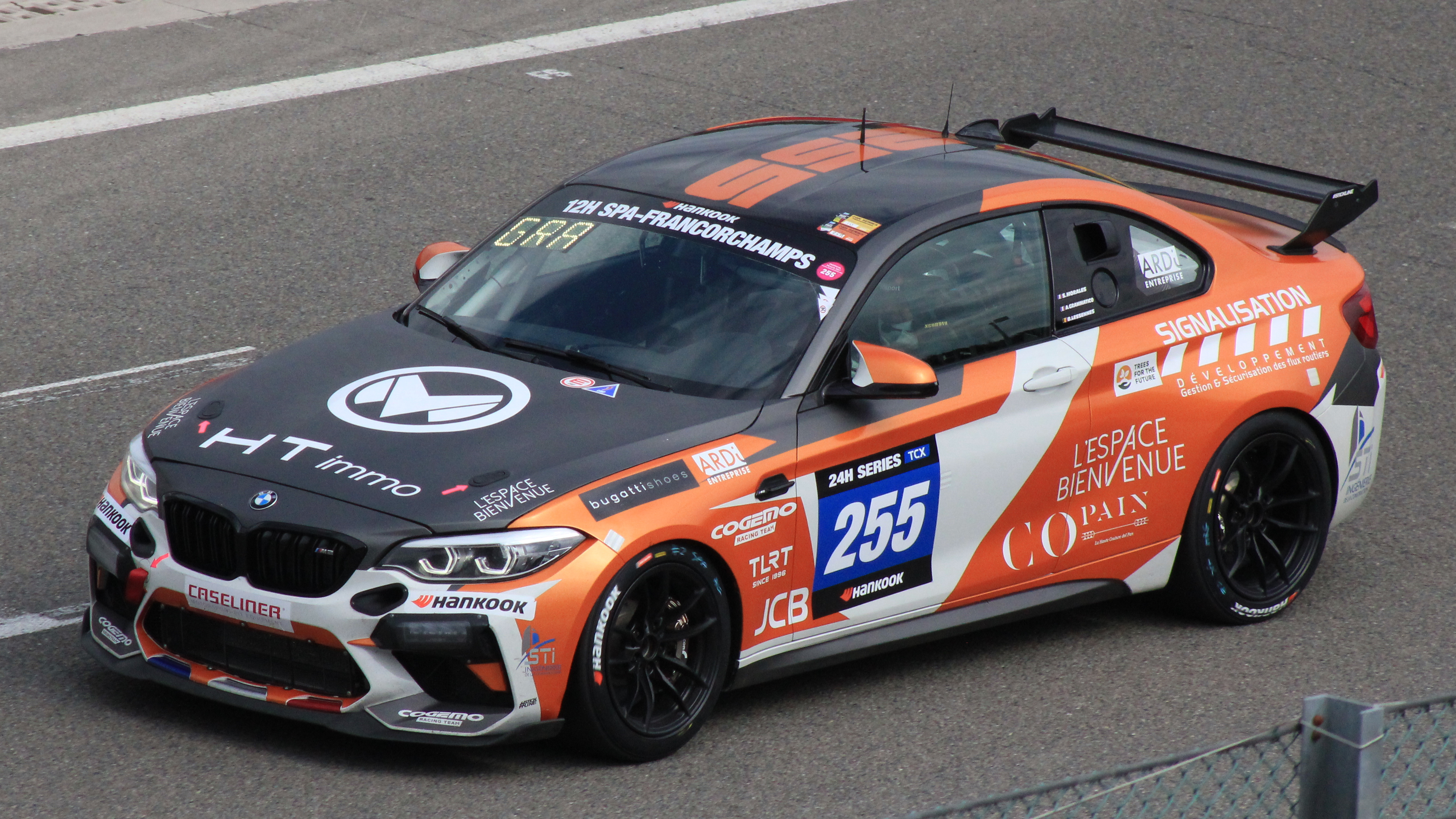
- Nationality: Belgian
- Born: Benjamin Pierre Chris Lessennes; 29 June 1999 (age 27) Namur, Belgium

TCR International Series career
- Debut season: 2017
- Current team: Boutsen Ginion Racing
- Categorisation: FIA Silver
- Car number: 63
- Starts: 2

Previous series
- 2016-17 2010-14: TCR Benelux Touring Car Championship; Karting

Championship titles
- 2017 2013 2013: TCR Benelux Touring Car Championship; French KF Junior; Belgian X30 Junior

Benjamin Pierre Chris Lessennes (born 29 June 1999) is a Belgian racing driver currently competing in the TCR International Series and TCR Benelux Touring Car Championship. Having previously competed in several karting championships.

== Racing career ==
Lessennes began his career in 2010 in karting. He took several good results in many different karting championships. In 2011, he finished second in the Belgian KF5 championship standings. In 2013, he won both the French KF Junior and Belgian X30 Junior karting titles. In 2014, he won the IAME International Finale X30 Seniors title. In 2016, he made the switch to the TCR Benelux Touring Car Championship, he finished the season fifth in the standings after one victory and three podiums. With his teammate Renaud Kuppens taking four victories. He continued in the series again in 2017.

In April 2017, it was announced that Lessennes would race in the TCR International Series, driving a Honda Civic Type R TCR for Boutsen Ginion Racing.

== Racing record ==
=== Career summary ===
Season	Series	Team	Races	Wins	Poles	F/Laps	Podiums	Points	Position
2016	TCR BeNeLux Touring Car Championship	Boutsen Ginion Racing	16	1	0	1	4	283.5	5th
2017	TCR BeNeLux Touring Car Championship	Boutsen Ginion Racing	18	5	2	4	11	420	**1st**
2017	TCR International Series	Boutsen Ginion Racing	2	0	0	0	1	31	18th
2018	TCR Europe Touring Car Series	Autodis Racing by THX	2	0	0	0	0	0	NC
2018	World Touring Car Cup	Boutsen Ginion Racing	18	0	0	0	0	48	19th
2019	GT4 European Series - Silver	Equipe Verschuur	12	2	2	1	6	143	**3rd**
2020	GT World Challenge Europe Endurance Cup	Boutsen Ginion Racing	1	0	0	0	0	0	NC
2020	Intercontinental GT Challenge	Boutsen Ginion Racing	1	0	0	0	0	0	NC
2020	French GT4 Cup - Silver	L'Espace Bienvenue	12	5	2	2	9	201	**1st**
2021	GT World Challenge Europe Sprint Cup	CMR	2	0	0	0	0	0	NC
2022	GT World Challenge Europe Endurance Cup	Boutsen Ginion Racing	5	0	0	0	0	0	NC
2022	French GT4 Cup - Silver	L'Espace Bienvenue							
2022	24H TCE Series - TCX	COGEMO/TLRT							
2023	GT4 European Series - Silver	L'Espace Bienvenue							
2023	Ultimate Cup Series Endurance GT-Touring Challenge - UGT4A	L'Espace Bienvenue	2	2	1	2	2	75	**3rd**
2023	ADAC GT4 Germany	PROsport Racing	2	0	0	0	0	16	27th
2023	Ultimate Cup Series - Sprint GT Touring Challenge - 3A	Rosel Racing by L'Espace Bienvenue	3	2	2	2	3	40	10th
2024	GT4 European Series - Silver	BMW Team France L'Espace Bienvenue	12	1	0	0	3	113	**3rd**
2024	Ultimate Cup Series GT Endurance Cup - UCS4	L'Espace Bienvenue	2	2	2	2	2	50	**3rd**
2025	GT4 European Series - Silver	BMW Team France L'Espace Bienvenue							
2025	Ultimate Cup European Series - GT Endurance Cup - Porsche Cup	RR by Racetivity							

=== Complete TCR International Series results ===
(key) (Races in bold indicate pole position) (Races in italics indicate fastest lap)

Year	Team	Car	1	2	3	4	5	6	7	8	9	10	11	12	13	14	15	16	17	18	19	20	DC	Points
2017	Boutsen Ginion Racing	Honda Civic Type R TCR	RIM; 1	RIM; 2	BHR; 1	BHR; 2	SPA; 1; 2	SPA; 2; 5	MNZ; 1	MNZ; 2	SAL; 1	SAL; 2	HUN; 1	HUN; 2	OSC; 1	OSC; 2	CHA; 1	CHA; 2	ZHE; 1	ZHE; 2	DUB; 1	DUB; 2	18th	31

^{†} Driver did not finish the race, but was classified as he completed over 90% of the race distance.

=== Complete World Touring Car Cup results ===
(key) (Races in bold indicate pole position) (Races in italics indicate fastest lap)

Year	Team	Car	1	2	3	4	5	6	7	8	9	10	11	12	13	14	15	16	17	18	19	20	21	22	23	24	25	26	27	28	29	30	DC	Points
2018	Boutsen Ginion Racing	Honda Civic Type R TCR	MAR; 1; 15	MAR; 2 Ret	MAR; 3; 17	HUN; 1; 14	HUN; 2; 8	HUN; 3; 5	GER; 1; 10	GER; 2 Ret	GER; 3; 4	NED; 1; 19	NED; 2; 12	NED; 3 Ret	POR; 1; 7	POR; 2 Ret	POR; 3; 8	SVK; 1; 20	SVK; 2 DSQ	SVK; 3 DSQ	CHN; 1	CHN; 2	CHN; 3	WUH; 1	WUH; 2	WUH; 3	JPN; 1	JPN; 2	JPN; 3	MAC; 1	MAC; 2	MAC; 3	19th	48

=== Complete GT World Challenge Europe Sprint Cup results ===
(key) (Races in bold indicate pole position) (Races in italics indicate fastest lap)

Year	Team	Car	Class	1	2	3	4	5	6	7	8	9	10	Pos.	Points
2021	CMR	Bentley Continental GT3	Pro	MAG; 1; 14	MAG; 2; 15	ZAN; 1	ZAN; 2	MIS; 1	MIS; 2	BRH; 1	BRH; 2	VAL; 1	VAL; 2	NC	0
