= Circuit Goodyear =

Motor racing circuit in Colmar-Berg, Luxembourg

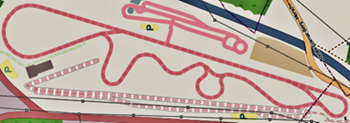
- Location: Colmar-Berg, Luxembourg
- Coordinates: 49°47′42″N 6°06′11″E
- Owner: Goodyear Tire and Rubber Company
- Operator: High Speed Racing Club Luxembourg
- Opened: 1976
- Major events: Former: TCR Benelux (2016)

Full Circuit
- Length: 4.035 km (2.507 mi)
- Turns: 11

National Circuit
- Length: 2.980 km (1.852 mi)
- Turns: 11
- Race lap record: 1:24.839 ( (Belgium) Vincent Radermecker, Volkswagen Golf GTI TCR, 2016, TCR)

The Circuit Goodyear is a motor racing circuit in Colmar-Berg, Luxembourg. The circuit is owned and used as a testing venue by the Goodyear Tire and Rubber Company.

== History ==
The facility is mostly used as a centre for driver training, with learner drivers in Luxembourg required to pass a course on the circuit before obtaining their licence.

Circuit Goodyear was last used for competitive racing for a round of the 2016 TCR Benelux Touring Car Championship. A chicane was placed at the end of the main straight due to the risks posed by cars heading into the regular first corner at high speed, however the alternate layout saw a large accident between Stefano Comini and Vincent Radermecker and racing has not returned since.

== Lap records ==
As of September 2016, the fastest official race lap records of the Circuit Goodyear are listed as:

Category	Time	Driver	Vehicle	Event
National Circuit: 2.980 km (1.852 mi)
TCR Touring Car	1:24.839	Vincent Radermecker	Volkswagen Golf GTI TCR	2016 Colmar-Berg TCR Benelux round
