= Fun Cup =

Belgian automobile race

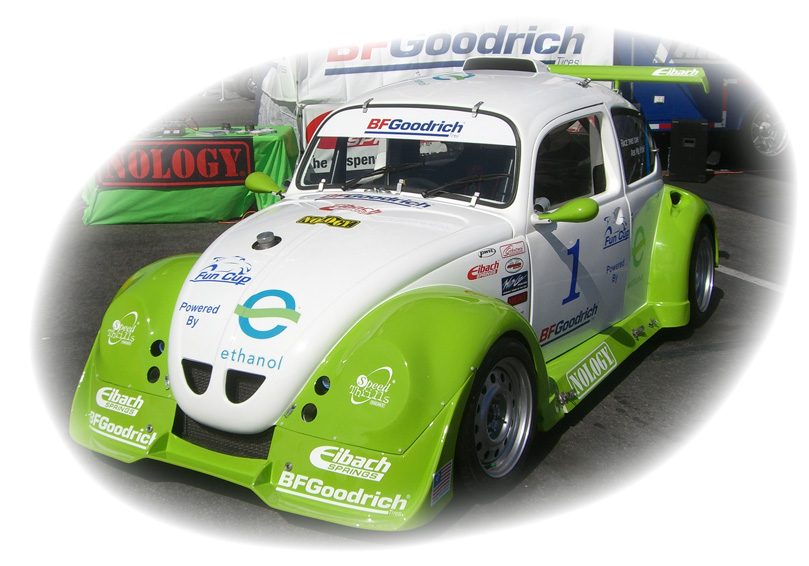
Fun Cup car on display at Irwindale Speedway, CA, USA

The Fun Cup is a one-make racing series created by Franz Dubois in 1997 in Belgium. The cars are identical, 130 bhp, 740 kg single seater racing cars with the bodywork styled upon the Volkswagen Beetle. The cars use a 1.8L Audi/VW engine and a Sadev 5 Speed sequential gearbox. Both engine and gearbox are sealed along with all major components to ensure the cars are technically identical and of equal performance. The tyres are a standard road radial which is specified to the series, and is run in both wet and dry.

The races last mostly between three and six hour endurance races, split between a team of two or more drivers. There are Fun Cup national series competed in the UK, Belgium, France, Spain, Italy, Germany and the Canary Islands, all of which combine in the 25 Hours at the Circuit de Spa-Francorchamps.

The pinnacle of the series, the 25 Hours at Spa, is one of the longest continuous motor races in the world, with a grid size in 2006 of 152 cars. The grids are now capped at 155 cars, which is the practical limit of the Spa-Francorchamps circuit.
