= Maxime Potty =

Belgian racing driver (born 1999)

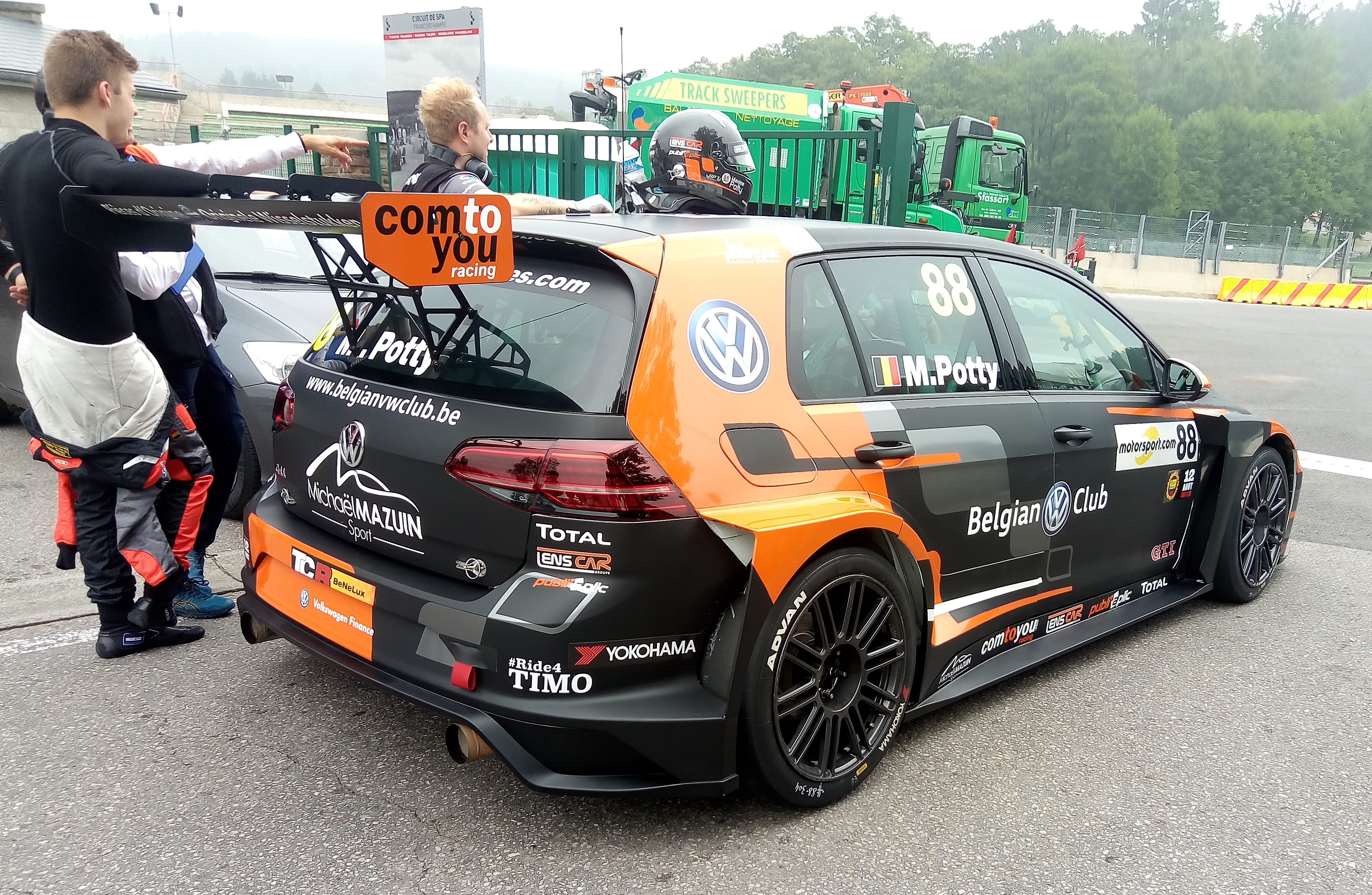
- Nationality: (Belgium) Belgian
- Born: 26 November 1999 (age 26) Hamoir, Belgium

TCR International Series career
- Debut season: 2017
- Current team: Comtoyou Racing
- Categorisation: FIA Silver
- Car number: 88
- Starts: 2

Previous series
- 2016-17 2010-15: TCR Benelux Touring Car Championship; Karting

Championship titles
- 2013 2012: CIK-FIA Karting Academy Trophy; Belgian X30 Junior

Maxime Potty (born 26 November 1999) is a Belgian racing driver currently competing in the TCR International Series and TCR Benelux Touring Car Championship. He has previously competed in several karting championships.

== Racing career ==
Potty began his career in 2010 in karting. He took several good results in many different karting championships. In 2012, he won the Belgian X30 Junior karting title. In 2013, he won the CIK-FIA Karting Academy Trophy title. In 2016, he made the switch to the TCR Benelux Touring Car Championship, he finished the season sixth in the standings after one victory and six podiums. Potty had several different teammates throughout the season, with Ronnie Latinne taking one podium, Stefano Comini taking two victories and Loris Hezemans and Grégoire Demoustier not taking any podiums. He continued in the series again in 2017.

In May 2017, it was announced that Potty would race in the TCR International Series, driving a Volkswagen Golf GTI TCR for Michaël Mazuin Sport.

== Racing record ==
=== Career summary ===
Season	Series	Team	Races	Wins	Poles	F/Laps	Podiums	Points	Position
2016	TCR BeNeLux Touring Car Championship	Team WRT	24	1	3	2	6	281	6th
2017	Peugeot 308 Racing Cup	JSB Compétition	10	0	0	0	0	58	8th
2017	TCR BeNeLux Touring Car Championship	Team WRT	24	1	3	4	11	380	**3rd**
2017	TCR Trophy Europe	Team WRT	2	0	0	0	0	31	4th
2017	TCR International Series	Michaël Mazuin Sport	2	0	0	0	0	0	NC
2018	TCR Europe Touring Car Series	Comtoyou Racing	14	0	0	0	2	76	8th
2019	TCR Europe Touring Car Series	Team WRT	14	0	0	1	2	161	11th
2024	World Rally Championship-2	Maxime Potty	2	0	0	0	0	6	34th
2025	World Rally Championship-2	Maxime Potty	1	0	0	0	0	4*	20th*

* Season still in progress.

=== Complete TCR International Series results ===
(key) (Races in bold indicate pole position) (Races in italics indicate fastest lap)

Year	Team	Car	1	2	3	4	5	6	7	8	9	10	11	12	13	14	15	16	17	18	19	20	DC	Points
2017	Michaël Mazuin Sport	Volkswagen Golf GTI TCR	RIM; 1	RIM; 2	BHR; 1	BHR; 2	SPA; 1; 17	**SPA**; **2**; 16	MNZ; 1	MNZ; 2	SAL; 1	SAL; 2	HUN; 1	HUN; 2	OSC; 1	OSC; 2	CHA; 1	CHA; 2	ZHE; 1	ZHE; 2	DUB; 1	DUB; 2	NC	0

=== Complete TCR Europe Touring Car Series results ===
(key) (Races in bold indicate pole position) (Races in italics indicate fastest lap)

Year	Team	Car	1	2	3	4	5	6	7	8	9	10	11	12	13	14	DC	Points
2018	Comtoyou Racing	Volkswagen Golf GTI TCR	LEC; 1; 11	LEC; 2; 12	ZAN; 1 Ret	ZAN; 2; 10	SPA; 1; 2^{2}	SPA; 2; 3	HUN; 1; 18	HUN; 2; 12	ASS; 1; 7^{3}	ASS; 2; 8	MNZ; 1; 4^{5}	MNZ; 2; 4	CAT; 1; 14	CAT; 2; 16	8th	76
2019	Team WRT	Volkswagen Golf GTI TCR	HUN; 1 Ret	HUN; 2; 9	HOC; 1; 3	HOC; 2; 6	SPA; 1; 3	SPA; 2; 23	RBR; 1; 8	RBR; 2; 8	OSC; 1; 9	OSC; 2; 20	CAT; 1; 14	CAT; 2; 14	MNZ; 1; 20	MNZ; 2; 9	11th	161

=== WRC-2 results ===
Year	Entrant	Car	1	2	3	4	5	6	7	8	9	10	11	12	13	14	Pos.	Points
2024	Maxime Potty	Citroën C3 Rally2	MON	SWE	KEN	CRO	POR	ITA; 25	POL	LAT	FIN	GRE	CHL	EUR; 7	JPN		34th	6
2025	Maxime Potty	Citroën C3 Rally2	MON; 8	SWE	KEN	ESP	POR	ITA	GRE	EST	FIN	PAR	CHL	EUR	JPN	SAU	20th*	4*

* Season still in progress.
