= Edouard Mondron =

Belgian racing driver (born 1986)

- Nationality: Belgian
- Born: Edouard Philippe Francis Léon René Mondron; 6 September 1986 (age 40) Brussels, Belgium
- Relatives: Guillaume Mondron (brother)

TCR International Series career
- Debut season: 2017
- Current team: Delahaye Racing
- Car number: 25
- Starts: 2

Previous series
- 2016-17 2013 2012 2010-11 2006: TCR Benelux Touring Car Championship; Belgian Racing Car Championship; Blancpain Endurance Series; Belgian Touring Car Series; Formula Renault 1.6 Belgium

Edouard Philippe Francis Léon René Mondron (born 6 September 1986) is a Belgian racing driver currently competing in the TCR International Series and TCR Benelux Touring Car Championship. Having previously competed in the Formula Renault 1.6 Belgium and Belgian Racing Car Championship amongst others.

== Racing career ==
Mondron began his career in 2006 in the Formula Renault 1.6 Belgium. He switched to the Belgian Touring Car Series for 2010. He continued there for 2011, finishing his second season in the series, second in the championship standings. For 2012, he made his Blancpain Endurance Series debut, starting the season in the Pro Cup, he switched to the Pro-Am Cup midway through the season. He finished the season twenty-second in the Pro Cup standings and twenty-third in the Pro-Am Cup standings. In 2013, he switched to the Belgian Racing Car Championship. In 2016, he made the switch to the TCR Benelux Touring Car Championship, teaming up with his brother Guillaume. The pair finished the season eighth in the standings after one victory and three podiums. The pair returned to the series again in 2017, taking a victory in first qualifying race of the season at Spa-Francorchamps.

In April 2017, it was announced that Mondron would race in the TCR International Series, driving a Volkswagen Golf GTI TCR for Delahaye Racing.

== Racing achievements ==
=== Complete TCR International Series results ===
(key) (Races in bold indicate pole position) (Races in italics indicate fastest lap)

Year	Team	Car	1	2	3	4	5	6	7	8	9	10	11	12	13	14	15	16	17	18	19	20	DC	Points
2017	Delahaye Racing	Volkswagen Golf GTI TCR	RIM; 1	RIM; 2	BHR; 1	BHR; 2	SPA; 1; 7	SPA; 2; 4	MNZ; 1	MNZ; 2	SAL; 1	SAL; 2	HUN; 1	HUN; 2	OSC; 1	OSC; 2	CHA; 1	CHA; 2	ZHE; 1	ZHE; 2	DUB; 1	DUB; 2	25th	18
