= Sébastien Loeb Racing =

French racing team

(France) Sébastien Loeb Racing
- Founded: 2012
- Team principal(s): Sébastien Loeb
- Current series: TCR Europe; Porsche Carrera Cup France; 208 Rally Cup; Andros Trophy
- Former series: WRX (World RX); FIA WTCR; FIA WTCC; FIA GT Series; ELMS
- Noted drivers: Rob Huff, Johan Kristoffersson, Mehdi Bennani, Tom Chilton, John Filippi

Sébastien Loeb Racing is a French racing team, founded by rally and racing driver Sébastien Loeb. It currently competes in the World Rallycross Championship, World Touring Car Cup, Porsche Carrera Cup France, and 208 Rally Cup. The team used to race in the World Touring Car Championship from 2015 to 2017.

== Racing record ==
Season	Championship	Drivers	Car
2012	Porsche Carrera Cup France	(France) Jean-Karl Vernay	Porsche 997 GT3 Cup
2012	Porsche Carrera Cup France	(France) Sébastien Loeb	Porsche 997 GT3 Cup
2012	Porsche Carrera Cup France	(France) Nicolas Marroc	Porsche 997 GT3 Cup
2012	Porsche Carrera Cup France	(France) Sacha Bottemanne	Porsche 997 GT3 Cup
2012	Porsche Carrera Cup France	(France) Vincent Beltoise	Porsche 997 GT3 Cup
2012	Porsche Carrera Cup France	(France) Christophe Lapierre	Porsche 997 GT3 Cup
2012	Championnat de France FFSA GT	(France) Sébastien Loeb	McLaren MP4-12C GT3
2012	Championnat de France FFSA GT	(France) Gilles Vannelet	McLaren MP4-12C GT3
2012	Championnat de France FFSA GT	(France) Gilles Vannelet	Mercedes-Benz SLS AMG GT3
2012	Championnat de France FFSA GT	(France) Nicolas Marroc	Mercedes-Benz SLS AMG GT3
2012	Championnat de France FFSA GT	(France) Frédéric Gabillon	Mercedes-Benz SLS AMG GT3
2012	Championnat de France FFSA GT	(France) Nicolas Tardif	Mercedes-Benz SLS AMG GT3
2012	European Le Mans Series	(France) Stéphane Sarrazin	Oreca 03 Nissan
2012	European Le Mans Series	(France) Nicolas Marroc	Oreca 03 Nissan
2012	European Le Mans Series	(France) Nicolas Minassian	Oreca 03 Nissan
2012	Mitjet 2L Supersport	(France) Sébastien Loeb	Tork Mitjet 2.0 Renault
2013	Porsche Carrera Cup France	(France) Côme Ledogar	Porsche 997 GT3 Cup
2013	Porsche Carrera Cup France	(France) Maxime Jousse	Porsche 997 GT3 Cup
2013	Porsche Carrera Cup France	(France) Christian Bottemanne	Porsche 997 GT3 Cup
2013	Porsche Carrera Cup France	(France) Sacha Bottemanne	Porsche 997 GT3 Cup
2013	Porsche Carrera Cup France	(France) Christophe Lapierre	Porsche 997 GT3 Cup
2013	Championnat de France FFSA GT	(France) Anthony Beltoise	McLaren MP4-12C GT3
2013	Championnat de France FFSA GT	(France) Laurent Pasquali	McLaren MP4-12C GT3
2013	Championnat de France FFSA GT	(France) Nicolas Marroc	McLaren MP4-12C GT3
2013	Championnat de France FFSA GT	(France) Nicolas Tardif	McLaren MP4-12C GT3
2013	Championnat de France FFSA GT	(France) Christophe Lapierre	McLaren MP4-12C GT3
2013	Championnat de France FFSA GT	(France) Sébastien Loeb	McLaren MP4-12C GT3
2013	FIA GT Series	(France) Sébastien Loeb	McLaren MP4-12C GT3
2013	FIA GT Series	(Portugal) Alvaro Parente	McLaren MP4-12C GT3
2013	FIA GT Series	(France) Mike Parisy	McLaren MP4-12C GT3
2013	FIA GT Series	(Austria) Andreas Zuber	McLaren MP4-12C GT3
2013	Mitjet 2L Supersport	(France) Sébastien Loeb	Tork Mitjet 2.0 Renault
2013	Mitjet 2L Supersport	(France) Steve Maire	Tork Mitjet 2.0 Renault
2013	Mitjet 2L Supersport	(France) Dominique Rebout	Tork Mitjet 2.0 Renault
2013	Mitjet 2L Supersport	(France) Frédéric Willmann	Tork Mitjet 2.0 Renault
2014	Porsche Carrera Cup France	(France) Nicolas Marroc	Porsche 991 GT3 Cup
2014	Porsche Carrera Cup France	(France) Maxime Jousse	Porsche 991 GT3 Cup
2014	Porsche Carrera Cup France	(France) Joffrey de Narda	Porsche 991 GT3 Cup
2014	Porsche Carrera Cup France	(France) Sacha Bottemanne	Porsche 991 GT3 Cup
2014	Porsche Carrera Cup France	(France) Christophe Lapierre	Porsche 991 GT3 Cup
2014	Porsche Carrera Cup France	(Norway) Roar Lindland	Porsche 991 GT3 Cup
2014	Championnat de France FFSA GT	(France) Anthony Beltoise	Audi R8 LMS Ultra
2014	Championnat de France FFSA GT	(France) Roland Bervillé	Audi R8 LMS Ultra
2014	Championnat de France FFSA GT	(France) Mike Parisy	Audi R8 LMS Ultra
2014	Championnat de France FFSA GT	(France) Henry Hassid	Audi R8 LMS Ultra
2014	European Le Mans Series	(France) Henry Hassid	Audi R8 LMS Ultra
2014	European Le Mans Series	(France) Mike Parisy	Audi R8 LMS Ultra
2014	European Le Mans Series	(France) Olivier Lombard	Audi R8 LMS Ultra
2014	European Le Mans Series	(France) Vincent Capillaire	Oreca 03 Nissan
2014	European Le Mans Series	(Czech Republic) Jan Charouz	Oreca 03 Nissan
2014	Mitjet 2L Supersport	(France) Julien Fébreau	Tork Mitjet 2.0 Renault

=== Complete World Touring Car Championship results ===
(key) (Races in bold indicate pole position) (Races in italics indicate fastest lap)

Year	No.	Driver	Car	1	2	3	4	5	6	7	8	9	10	11	12	13	14	15	16	17	18	19	20	21	22	23	24	DC	Points	Trophy	Points
2015	25	(Morocco) **Mehdi Bennani**	Citroën C-Elysée WTCC	ARG; 1; 13	ARG; 2; 5	MAR; 1; 4	MAR; 2; 12	HUN; 1; 11	HUN; 2 Ret	GER; 1; 7	GER; 2; 6	RUS; 1; 14	RUS; 2 Ret	SVK; 1 Ret	SVK; 2; 7	FRA; 1; 9	**FRA**; **2**; 9	POR; 1; 11	POR; 2; 10	JPN; 1; 7	JPN; 2; 10	CHN; 1; 5	CHN; 2; 7	THA; 1; 4	THA; 2; 7	QAT; 1; 2	QAT; 2; 5	8th	127	4th	150
2016	3	(United Kingdom) **Tom Chilton**	Citroën C-Elysée WTCC	FRA; 1; 11	FRA; 2; 9	SVK; 1; 9	SVK; 2; 7	HUN; 1; 2	HUN; 2; 5	MAR; 1; 5	MAR; 2 DSQ	GER; 1; 2	GER; 2; 3	RUS; 1; 14	RUS; 2; 16	POR; 1; 2	POR; 2; 10	ARG; 1; 1	ARG; 2; 9	JPN; 1; 8	JPN; 2; 6	CHN; 1 Ret	CHN; 2; 9	**QAT**; **1**; 2	QAT; 2 Ret			8th	163	1st	334
2016	25	(Morocco) **Mehdi Bennani**	Citroën C-Elysée WTCC	FRA; 1; 2	FRA; 2; 8	SVK; 1; 2	SVK; 2; 6	**HUN**; **1**; 1	HUN; 2; 8	MAR; 1; 6	MAR; 2; 5	GER; 1; 5	GER; 2; 5	RUS; 1; 9	RUS; 2; 10	POR; 1; 4	POR; 2; 8	ARG; 1; 8	ARG; 2; 7	JPN; 1; 16	JPN; 2; 4	CHN; 1; 11	CHN; 2; 3	QAT; 1; 16	**QAT**; **2**; 1			5th	206	1st	334
2017	3	(United Kingdom) **Tom Chilton**	Citroën C-Elysée WTCC	MAR; 1; 7	MAR; 2; 4	ITA; 1; 1	ITA; 2 Ret	HUN; 1; 2	HUN; 2; 3	GER; 1; 4	GER; 2; 5	POR; 1; 4	POR; 2; 6	ARG; 1; 4	ARG; 2; 7	CHN; 1 Ret	CHN; 2; 3	JPN; 1; 1	JPN; 2; 10	MAC; 1; 8	MAC; 2; 3	QAT; 1; 1	QAT; 2; 5					3rd	248.5	1st	175
2017	25	(Morocco) **Mehdi Bennani**	Citroën C-Elysée WTCC	MAR; 1; 3	MAR; 2; 6	ITA; 1 NC	ITA; 2; 7	HUN; 1; 7	HUN; 2; 1	GER; 1; 2	GER; 2; 6	POR; 1; 1	POR; 2; 7	ARG; 1; 2	ARG; 2; 5	CHN; 1 NC	CHN; 2; 11	JPN; 1; 5	JPN; 2; 6	**MAC**; **1**; 1	MAC; 2; 7	QAT; 1; 2	QAT; 2 Ret					6th	234	1st	175
2017	27	(France) **John Filippi**	Citroën C-Elysée WTCC	MAR; 1 NC	MAR; 2; 11	ITA; 1; 7	ITA; 2; 10	**HUN**; **1**; 14	HUN; 2; 11	GER; 1; 10	GER; 2; 10	POR; 1; 10	POR; 2; 10	ARG; 1; 8	ARG; 2; 12	CHN; 1; 4	CHN; 2; 6	JPN; 1; 12	JPN; 2; 9	MAC; 1; 11	MAC; 2; 16	QAT; 1; 4	QAT; 2; 9					12th	48	1st	175
2017	30	(China) **Ma Qing Hua**	Citroën C-Elysée WTCC	MAR; 1	MAR; 2	ITA; 1	ITA; 2	HUN; 1	HUN; 2	GER; 1	GER; 2	POR; 1	POR; 2	ARG; 1	ARG; 2	CHN; 1	CHN; 2	JPN; 1	JPN; 2	MAC; 1; 14	MAC; 2; 12	QAT; 1	QAT; 2					21st	0	1st	175

=== Complete FIA World Rallycross Championship results ===
(key)

==== Supercar ====
Year	Entrant	Car	No.	Driver	1	2	3	4	5	6	7	8	9	10	11	12	WRX	Points	Teams	Points
2018	Sébastien Loeb Racing	Peugeot 208	66	(France) **Grégoire Demoustier**	BAR; 16	POR; 15	BEL; 15	GBR; 18	NOR; 22	SWE; 16	CAN; 14	FRA; 19	LAT; 19	USA; 15	GER; 17	RSA; 17	40th	-4	N/A	N/A
