= 2017 World Touring Car Championship =

Motorsport contest

Champions
- World Drivers' Champion: Thed Björk
- World Manufacturers' Champion: Volvo Polestar

Seasons
- ← 2016 2018 (WTCR) →

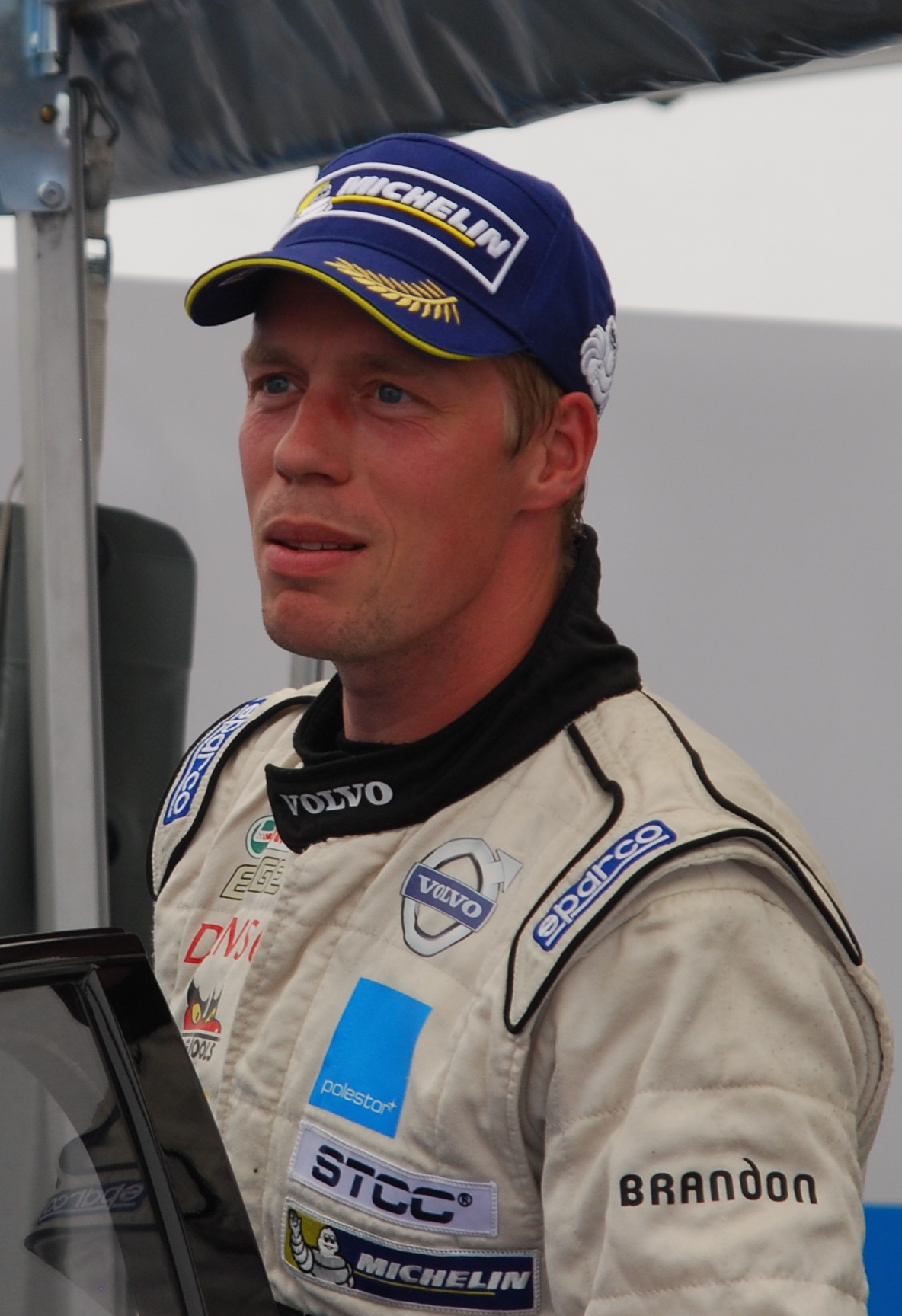
The Drivers Championship was won by Thed Björk, pictured in 2015.

The 2017 FIA World Touring Car Championship was a motor racing competition organised by the Fédération Internationale de l'Automobile for Super 2000 Cars. It was the fourteenth and last season of the FIA World Touring Car Championship, and the thirteenth since the series was revived in 2005.

The Drivers Championship was won by Thed Björk and the Manufacturers Championship by Volvo Polestar.

== Teams and drivers ==
Team	Car	No.	Drivers	Rounds
Manufacturer entries
(Japan) Honda Racing Team JAS	Honda Civic WTCC	2	(Italy) Gabriele Tarquini	7
(Japan) Honda Racing Team JAS	Honda Civic WTCC	5	(Hungary) Norbert Michelisz	All
(Japan) Honda Racing Team JAS	Honda Civic WTCC	18	(Portugal) Tiago Monteiro	1–6
(Japan) Honda Racing Team JAS	Honda Civic WTCC	34	(Japan) Ryō Michigami	All
(Japan) Honda Racing Team JAS	Honda Civic WTCC	86	(Argentina) Esteban Guerrieri	8–10
(Sweden) Polestar Cyan Racing	Volvo S60 Polestar TC1	61	(Argentina) Néstor Girolami	1–9
(Sweden) Polestar Cyan Racing	Volvo S60 Polestar TC1	62	(Sweden) Thed Björk	All
(Sweden) Polestar Cyan Racing	Volvo S60 Polestar TC1	63	(Netherlands) Nick Catsburg	All
(Sweden) Polestar Cyan Racing	Volvo S60 Polestar TC1	64	(France) Yvan Müller	10
WTCC Trophy
(France) Sébastien Loeb Racing	Citroën C-Elysée WTCC	3	(United Kingdom) Tom Chilton	All
(France) Sébastien Loeb Racing	Citroën C-Elysée WTCC	25	(Morocco) Mehdi Bennani	All
(France) Sébastien Loeb Racing	Citroën C-Elysée WTCC	27	(France) John Filippi	All
(France) Sébastien Loeb Racing	Citroën C-Elysée WTCC	30	(China) Ma Qing Hua	9
(France) RC Motorsport	Lada Vesta WTCC	4	(Macau) Mak Ka Lok	9
(France) RC Motorsport	Lada Vesta WTCC	22	(Portugal) Manuel Fernandes	5
(France) RC Motorsport	Lada Vesta WTCC	24	(United States) Kevin Gleason	2–10
(France) RC Motorsport	Lada Vesta WTCC	26	(Macau) Filipe de Souza	7–8
(France) RC Motorsport	Lada Vesta WTCC	68	(France) Yann Ehrlacher	All
(Hungary) Zengő Motorsport	Honda Civic WTCC	8	(France) Aurélien Panis	1–5
(Hungary) Zengő Motorsport	Honda Civic WTCC	66	(Hungary) Zsolt Szabó	6–10
(Hungary) Zengő Motorsport	Honda Civic WTCC	99	(Hungary) Dániel Nagy	All
(Italy) ROAL Motorsport	Chevrolet RML Cruze TC1	9	(Netherlands) Tom Coronel	All
(Spain) Campos Racing	Chevrolet RML Cruze TC1	11	(Switzerland) Kris Richard	8, 10
(Spain) Campos Racing	Chevrolet RML Cruze TC1	44	(Hong Kong) Wong Po Wah	9
(Spain) Campos Racing	Chevrolet RML Cruze TC1	86	(Argentina) Esteban Guerrieri	1–7
(Spain) Campos Racing	Chevrolet RML Cruze TC1	88	(Hong Kong) Chan Kin Pong	9
(Germany) ALL-INKL.COM Münnich Motorsport	Citroën C-Elysée WTCC	12	(United Kingdom) Robert Huff	All
ETCC Entries ineligible to score points
(Hungary) Zengő Motorsport	SEAT León TCR	105	(Hungary) Anett György	4
(Hungary) Zengő Motorsport	SEAT León TCR	108	(Hungary) Norbert Nagy	4
(Hungary) Zengő Motorsport	SEAT León TCR	166	(Hungary) Zsolt Szabó	4
(Germany) Pfister Racing	SEAT León TCR	107	(Germany) Andreas Pfister	4
(Switzerland) Rikli Motorsport	Honda Civic Type R TCR	112	(Switzerland) Peter Rikli	4
(Switzerland) Rikli Motorsport	Honda Civic Type R TCR	191	(Switzerland) Christjohannes Schreiber	4
(North Macedonia) AKK Stefanovski	SEAT León TCR	114	(North Macedonia) Igor Stefanovski	4
(Serbia) LEIN Racing	SEAT León TCR	117	(Serbia) Mladen Lalušić	4
(Serbia) LEIN Racing	SEAT León TCR	137	(Portugal) Fábio Mota	4
(Czech Republic) Křenek Motorsport	SEAT León TCR	122	(Czech Republic) Petr Fulín	4
(Bulgaria) Kraf Racing	Audi RS 3 LMS TCR	144	(Bulgaria) Plamen Kralev	4

=== Team changes ===
- Citroën withdrew their factory team from the series in 2016 to concentrate on their 2017 World Rally Championship campaign with the C3 WRC. The C-Elysée WTCC was still available to private entries.
- Lada also withdrew their factory team at the end of the 2016 season. RC Motorsport then entered the Championship running a pair of Vesta WTCC cars before adding third car at selected rounds.
- Volvo will expand its campaign to three full-time entries from two full-time entries. All the three cars will be entered by Polestar Cyan Racing.
- Münnich Motorsport switched to a Citroën C-Elysée WTCC for the 2017 season after racing with a Chevrolet RML Cruze TC1 for the last three seasons.

=== Driver changes ===
- Four time champion Yvan Muller retired after 2016. But has been brought out of retirement by Polestar Cyan Racing in order to assist Volvo’s challenge for the season finale in Qatar.
- Three time champion José María López left WTCC to join Toyota's WEC team in conjunction with a Formula E programme.
- Following the withdrawal of Lada, Gabriele Tarquini was unable to find a seat and left the series to join Hyundai's development of the i30 TCR. However he made a return at the Race of China for Honda after Tiago Monteiro was forced to withdraw after suffering from the after-effects of a crash in testing in early September.
- Following the withdrawal of Lada, Hugo Valente left WTCC for TCR.
- Fredrik Ekblom left Polestar Cyan Racing and returned to the STCC with Kristoffersson Motorsport.
- Following the withdrawal of Lada, Nick Catsburg joined Polestar Cyan Racing.
- After competing in two rounds in 2015 and one round in 2016, Néstor Girolami will make his full-time World Touring Car Championship debut in 2017, racing for Polestar Cyan Racing.
- Ryō Michigami joined Honda Racing Team JAS for a full-season campaign after making his World Touring Car Championship debut at his home race in Japan during the 2016 season.
- Robert Huff left the Castrol Honda World Touring Car Team to join Münnich Motorsport.
- John Filippi left Campos Racing to join Sébastien Loeb Racing.
- Aurélien Panis entered the series, driving for Zengő Motorsport.
- Yann Ehrlacher entered the series, driving for RC Motorsport.
- Kevin Gleason entered the series, driving for RC Motorsport.

== Rule changes ==
More points will be awarded for the winners of the Manufacturers Against the Clock (MAC3) team time trials (12 rather than 10), optional rallycross-style "joker laps" will be introduced in street-circuits, the second or "main race" on a race weekend will be increased in length to two laps longer than the opening races (with the exception of the Race of Germany at Nürburgring Nordschleife), the points scoring structure will be revised with more points awarded in the main race, and the length of race meetings will be reduced to two days, with testing on Fridays to be abolished and the Free Practice 1 and 2 sessions being increased from 30 to 45 minutes to compensate.

== Calendar ==
The Monza and Macau circuits return to the WTCC, whereas France, Russia and Slovakia are dropped.

Rnd.	Race	Race name	Circuit	Date	Supporting
1	1	AFRIQUIA Race of Morocco	(Morocco) Circuit International Automobile Moulay El Hassan	9 April	stand-alone event
1	2	AFRIQUIA Race of Morocco	(Morocco) Circuit International Automobile Moulay El Hassan	9 April	stand-alone event
2	3	OSCARO Race of Italy	(Italy) Autodromo Nazionale di Monza, Monza	30 April	European Touring Car Cup
2	4	OSCARO Race of Italy	(Italy) Autodromo Nazionale di Monza, Monza	30 April	European Touring Car Cup
3	5	JVCKENWOOD Race of Hungary	(Hungary) Hungaroring	14 May	European Touring Car Cup
3	6	JVCKENWOOD Race of Hungary	(Hungary) Hungaroring	14 May	European Touring Car Cup
4	7	Race of Germany	(Germany) Nürburgring Nordschleife	27 May	Nürburgring 24 Hours; European Touring Car Cup
4	8	Race of Germany	(Germany) Nürburgring Nordschleife	27 May	Nürburgring 24 Hours; European Touring Car Cup
5	9	Race of Portugal	(Portugal) Circuito Internacional de Vila Real	25 June	European Touring Car Cup
5	10	Race of Portugal	(Portugal) Circuito Internacional de Vila Real	25 June	European Touring Car Cup
6	11	Race of Argentina	(Argentina) Autódromo Termas de Río Hondo	16 July	Campeonato Argentino de Turismo Nacional
6	12	Race of Argentina	(Argentina) Autódromo Termas de Río Hondo	16 July	Campeonato Argentino de Turismo Nacional
7	13	Race of China	(China) Ningbo International Circuit	15 October	China Touring Car Championship; F4 Chinese Championship
7	14	Race of China	(China) Ningbo International Circuit	15 October	China Touring Car Championship; F4 Chinese Championship
8	15	JVCKENWOOD Race of Japan	(Japan) Twin Ring Motegi	29 October	stand-alone event
8	16	JVCKENWOOD Race of Japan	(Japan) Twin Ring Motegi	29 October	stand-alone event
9	17	JVCKENWOOD Race of Macau	Guia Circuit, Macau	18 November	TCR Chinese Racing Cup; FIA F3 World Cup; FIA GT World Cup
9	18	JVCKENWOOD Race of Macau	Guia Circuit, Macau	19 November	TCR Chinese Racing Cup; FIA F3 World Cup; FIA GT World Cup
10	19	Race of Qatar	(Qatar) Losail International Circuit	1 December	stand-alone event
10	20	Race of Qatar	(Qatar) Losail International Circuit	1 December	stand-alone event

== Results and standings ==
=== Compensation weights ===
- base weight of 1,100 kg

Car	Marrakech	Monza	Hungaroring	Nürburgring	Vila Real	Termas de Río Hondo	Ningbo	Motegi	Macau	Losail
Citroën C-Elysée WTCC	+50 kg	+50 kg	+60 kg	+80 kg	+80 kg	+80 kg	+50 kg	+40 kg	0 kg	+60 kg
Honda Civic WTCC	0 kg	0 kg	+80 kg	+70 kg	+50 kg	+60 kg	+80 kg	+80 kg	+70 kg	+80 kg
Chevrolet RML Cruze TC1	0 kg	0 kg	0 kg	+30 kg	+20 kg	0 kg	0 kg	+10 kg	+10 kg	+10 kg
Lada Vesta WTCC	0 kg	0 kg	0 kg	0 kg	0 kg	0 kg	0 kg	0 kg	0 kg	+10 kg
Volvo S60 Polestar TC1	0 kg	0 kg	+80 kg	+80 kg	+80 kg	+60 kg	+70 kg	+70 kg	+80 kg	+80 kg

=== Races ===
Race	Race name	MAC3 winner	Pole position	Fastest lap	Winning driver	Winning team	Winning manufacturer	Independent winner	Report
1	Race of Morocco	(Sweden) Volvo		(Hungary) Dániel Nagy	(Argentina) Esteban Guerrieri	(Spain) Campos Racing	(United States) Chevrolet	(Argentina) Esteban Guerrieri	Report
2	Race of Morocco	(Sweden) Volvo	(Portugal) Tiago Monteiro	(Argentina) Esteban Guerrieri	(Portugal) Tiago Monteiro	(Japan) Honda Racing Team JAS	(Japan) Honda	(United Kingdom) Tom Chilton	Report
3	Race of Italy	(Sweden) Volvo		(Sweden) Thed Björk	(United Kingdom) Tom Chilton	(France) Sébastien Loeb Racing	(France) Citroën	(United Kingdom) Tom Chilton	Report
4	Race of Italy	(Sweden) Volvo	(Sweden) Thed Björk	(Sweden) Thed Björk	(Sweden) Thed Björk	(Sweden) Polestar Cyan Racing	(Sweden) Volvo	(United Kingdom) Robert Huff	Report
5	Race of Hungary	(Japan) Honda		(Argentina) Esteban Guerrieri	(Portugal) Tiago Monteiro	(Japan) Honda Racing Team JAS	(Japan) Honda	(United Kingdom) Tom Chilton	Report
6	Race of Hungary	(Japan) Honda	(United Kingdom) Robert Huff	(United Kingdom) Robert Huff	(Morocco) Mehdi Bennani	(France) Sébastien Loeb Racing	(France) Citroën	(Morocco) Mehdi Bennani	Report
7	Race of Germany	(Sweden) Volvo		(United Kingdom) Tom Chilton	(Sweden) Thed Björk	(Sweden) Polestar Cyan Racing	(Sweden) Volvo	(Morocco) Mehdi Bennani	Report
8	Race of Germany	(Sweden) Volvo	(Hungary) Norbert Michelisz	(Netherlands) Nick Catsburg	(Netherlands) Nick Catsburg	(Sweden) Polestar Cyan Racing	(Sweden) Volvo	(United Kingdom) Robert Huff	Report
9	Race of Portugal	(Sweden) Volvo		(Hungary) Norbert Michelisz	(Morocco) Mehdi Bennani	(France) Sébastien Loeb Racing	(France) Citroën	(Morocco) Mehdi Bennani	Report
10	Race of Portugal	(Sweden) Volvo	(Hungary) Norbert Michelisz	(United Kingdom) Robert Huff	(Hungary) Norbert Michelisz	(Japan) Honda Racing Team JAS	(Japan) Honda	(United Kingdom) Robert Huff	Report
11	Race of Argentina	(Sweden) Volvo		(Sweden) Thed Björk	(France) Yann Ehrlacher	(France) RC Motorsport	(Russia) Lada	(France) Yann Ehrlacher	Report
12	Race of Argentina	(Sweden) Volvo	(Netherlands) Nick Catsburg	(Netherlands) Nick Catsburg	(Hungary) Norbert Michelisz	(Japan) Honda Racing Team JAS	(Japan) Honda	(Argentina) Esteban Guerrieri	Report
13	Race of China	(Sweden) Volvo		(Argentina) Esteban Guerrieri	(Argentina) Esteban Guerrieri	(Spain) Campos Racing	(United States) Chevrolet	(Argentina) Esteban Guerrieri	Report
14	Race of China	(Sweden) Volvo	(Argentina) Néstor Girolami	(Hungary) Zsolt Szabó	(Argentina) Néstor Girolami	(Sweden) Polestar Cyan Racing	(Sweden) Volvo	(United Kingdom) Tom Chilton	Report
15	Race of Japan	(Japan) Honda		(United Kingdom) Tom Chilton	(United Kingdom) Tom Chilton	(France) Sébastien Loeb Racing	(France) Citroën	(United Kingdom) Tom Chilton	Report
16	Race of Japan	(Japan) Honda	(Hungary) Norbert Michelisz	(Netherlands) Nick Catsburg	(Hungary) Norbert Michelisz	(Japan) Honda Racing Team JAS	(Japan) Honda	(Morocco) Mehdi Bennani	Report
17	Guia Race of Macau	(Japan) Honda		(United Kingdom) Robert Huff	(Morocco) Mehdi Bennani	(France) Sébastien Loeb Racing	(France) Citroën	(Morocco) Mehdi Bennani	Report
18	Guia Race of Macau	(Japan) Honda	(United Kingdom) Robert Huff	(China) Ma Qing Hua	(United Kingdom) Robert Huff	(Germany) ALL-INKL.COM Münnich Motorsport	(France) Citroën	(United Kingdom) Robert Huff	Report
19	Race of Qatar	(Sweden) Volvo		(Morocco) Mehdi Bennani	(United Kingdom) Tom Chilton	(France) Sébastien Loeb Racing	(France) Citroën	(United Kingdom) Tom Chilton	Report
20	Race of Qatar	(Sweden) Volvo	(Argentina) Esteban Guerrieri	(Argentina) Esteban Guerrieri	(Argentina) Esteban Guerrieri	(Japan) Honda Racing Team JAS	(Japan) Honda	(United Kingdom) Robert Huff	Report

=== Championship standings ===
==== Drivers' championship ====
China Race 2 was half-points awarded.

Pos.	Driver	MAR (Morocco)		ITA (Italy)		HUN (Hungary)		GER (Germany)		PRT (Portugal)		ARG (Argentina)		CHN (China)		JPN (Japan)		MAC (Macau)		QAT (Qatar)		Pts.
1	(Sweden) Thed Björk	2	7	5	**1**^{1}	NC	7	1	4^{5}	3	2^{3}	6	3^{5}	NC	2^{2}	4	5	4	5^{4}	5	4^{4}	283.5
2	(Hungary) Norbert Michelisz	5	2^{3}	NC	6	NC	4	7	**2**^{1}	7	**1**^{1}	14	1^{2}	DSQ	DSQ	7	**1**^{1}	5	2^{2}	9	8	255
3	(United Kingdom) Tom Chilton	7	5	1	Ret	2	3	4	5	4	6	4	7	Ret	3^{4}	1	10	8	3^{3}	1	5	248.5
4	(Argentina) Esteban Guerrieri	1	13	4	8	6	6^{3}	5	8	Ret	8	3	4^{4}	1	4^{5}	3	4^{4}	6	4^{5}	10	**1**^{1}	241
5	(Netherlands) Nicky Catsburg	4	4	8	4^{4}	5	2^{4}	6	1^{2}	5	4^{5}	15	**16**^{1}	3	5	9	2^{2}	9	13	8	3^{2}	238.5
6	(Morocco) Mehdi Bennani	3	6^{5}	NC	7	7	1^{2}	2	6	1	7	2	5	NC	11	5	6	**1**	7	2	Ret	234
7	(United Kingdom) Robert Huff	Ret	9^{4}	2	3^{3}	3	**10**^{1}	3	3^{3}	6	5^{2}	7	9	Ret	12†^{3}	8	11	7	**1**^{1}	7	2^{3}	215
8	(Portugal) Tiago Monteiro	6	**1**^{1}	3	2^{2}	1	5	15	13^{4}	2	3^{4}	5	2^{3}									200
9	(Argentina) Néstor Girolami	9	3^{2}	NC	5^{5}	4	Ret^{5}	**Ret**	DNS	8	9	16	6	Ret	**1**^{1}	11	3^{3}	13	9			112
10	(France) Yann Ehrlacher	Ret	12	11	9	8	8	9	9	9	11	**1**	8	**2**	8	2	7	12	14	13	12	90
11	(Netherlands) Tom Coronel	**8**	8	**6**	11	9	9	8	7	DNS	DNS	9	10	7†	9	13	13	2	6	11	11	69
12	(France) John Filippi	NC	11	7	10	**14**†	11	10	10	10	10	8	12	4	6	12	9	11	16	4	9	48
13	(United States) Kevin Gleason			9	13	12	12	12	11	Ret	12	11	13	5	7	**6**	8	10	8	**3**	14	47.5
14	(Japan) Ryō Michigami	Ret	10	Ret	Ret	11	13	11	Ret	**Ret**	13	10	11	DSQ	DSQ	10	Ret^{5}	3	15	14	10	20
15	(France) Yvan Muller																			6	7^{5}	16
16	(Switzerland) Kris Richard															14	12			12	6	10
17	(Macau) Filipe de Souza													6	10	16	15					8.5
18	(France) Aurélien Panis	10	Ret	DNS	12	10	14	13	12	11	16†											2
19	(Hungary) Dániel Nagy	11†	14	10	Ret	13	Ret	14	Ret	13	14	12	14	DSQ	DSQ	15	14	15	11	15	13	1
20	(Hungary) Zsolt Szabó											13	15	DSQ	DSQ	17	16	16	10	16	15	1
21	(China) Ma Qinghua																	14	12			0
22	(Portugal) Manuel Fernandes									12	15											0
23	(Macau) Mak Ka Lok																	17	17			0
24	(Hong Kong) Wong Po Wah																	18	DNS			0
-	(Hong Kong) Chan Kin Pong																	WD	WD			0
-	(Italy) Gabriele Tarquini													DSQ	DSQ							-
ETCC entries ineligible for points
-	(North Macedonia) Igor Stefanovski							17	14													-
-	(Czech Republic) Petr Fulín							16	16													-
-	(Portugal) Fábio Mota							18	15													-
-	(Hungary) Norbert Nagy							19	18													-
-	(Germany) Andreas Pfister							23	17													-
-	(Switzerland) Peter Rikli							20	Ret													-
-	(Serbia) Mladen Lalušić							21	21													-
-	(Bulgaria) Plamen Kralev							24	19													-
-	(Hungary) Zsolt Szabó							25	20													-
-	(Hungary) Anett György							22	Ret													-
-	(Switzerland) Christjohannes Schreiber							Ret	DNS													-

Colour	Result
Gold	Winner
Silver	Second place
Bronze	Third place
Green	Points classification
Blue	Non-points classification
Blue	Non-classified finish (NC)
Purple	Retired, not classified (Ret)
Red	Did not qualify (DNQ)
Red	Did not pre-qualify (DNPQ)
Black	Disqualified (DSQ)
White	Did not start (DNS)
White	Withdrew (WD)
White	Race cancelled (C)
Blank	Did not practice (DNP)
Blank	Did not arrive (DNA)
Blank	Excluded (EX)

**Bold** – Pole
Italics – Fastest Lap

† – Drivers did not finish the race, but were classified as they completed over 75% of the race distance. ‡ – Honda Racing Team JAS was disqualified from the Race of China because of non-compliant fuel injectors.

Championship points were awarded on the results of each race at each event as follows:

Position	**1st**	**2nd**	**3rd**	**4th**	**5th**	**6th**	**7th**	**8th**	**9th**	**10th**
Opening Race Points	25	18	15	12	10	8	6	4	2	1
Main Race Points	30	23	19	16	13	10	7	4	2	1

Notes

- ^{1} ^{2} ^{3} ^{4} ^{5} refers to the classification of the drivers after the qualifying for the main race (second race), where bonus points are awarded 5–4–3–2–1.

==== Manufacturers' Championship ====
Pos.	Manufacturer	MAR (Morocco)			ITA (Italy)			HUN (Hungary)			GER (Germany)			PRT (Portugal)			ARG (Argentina)			CHN (China)			JPN (Japan)			MAC (Macau)			QAT (Qatar)			Pts.
Pos.	Manufacturer	M	R1	R2	M	R1	R2	M	R1	R2	M	R1	R2	M	R1	R2	M	R1	R2	M	R1	R2	M	R1	R2	M	R1	R2	M	R1	R2	Pts.
1	(Sweden) Volvo	1	1	3^{2}	1	2	1^{1}	2	2	1^{1}	1	1	1^{2}	1	2	2^{2}	1	2	3^{1}	1	1	1^{1}	2	2	2^{2}	2	2	3^{2}	1	1	2^{2}	908.5
1	(Sweden) Volvo	1	2	4^{4}	1	3	3^{3}	2	3	4^{2}	1	2	3^{4}	1	3	4^{4}	1	4	4^{4}	1	NC	2^{2}	2	4	3^{3}	2	4	4^{4}	1	2	3^{3}	908.5
2	(Japan) Honda	2	3	1^{1}	2	1	2^{2}	1	1	2^{3}	2	3	2^{1}	2	1	1^{1}	2	1	1^{2}	DSQ	DSQ	DSQ	1	1	1^{1}	1	1	1^{1}	2	3	1^{1}	880
2	(Japan) Honda	2	4	2^{3}	2	4	4^{4}	1	4	3^{4}	2	4	4^{3}	2	4	3^{3}	2	3	2^{3}	DSQ	DSQ	DSQ	1	3	4^{4}	1	3	2^{3}	2	4	4	880

Notes

Only the two best placed cars of each manufacturer earned points.

- ^{1} ^{2} ^{3} ^{4} ^{5} refers to the classification of the drivers in the main race qualification, where bonus points are awarded 5–4–3–2–1. Points were only awarded to the fastest two cars from each manufacturer.

In MAC3 points are awarded if 3 cars of the same manufacturer within a 15 seconds gap. MAC3 points were awarded as follows:

Position	**1st**	**2nd**	**3rd**
Points	12	8	6

==== WTCC Trophy ====
WTCC Trophy points are awarded to the first eight drivers classified in each race on the following scale: 10-8-6-5-4-3-2-1. One point is awarded to the highest-placed WTCC Trophy competitor in qualifying and another for the fastest lap in each race.

Pos.	Driver	MAR (Morocco)		ITA (Italy)		HUN (Hungary)		GER (Germany)		PRT (Portugal)		ARG (Argentina)		CHN (China)		JPN (Japan)		MAC (Macau)		QAT (Qatar)		Pts.
1	(United Kingdom) Tom Chilton	3	1	1	Ret	1	2	3	2	2	2	4	3	Ret	1	1	5	4	2	1	2	138
2	(United Kingdom) Robert Huff	Ret	**4**	2	**1**	2	**6**	2	**1**	3	**1**	5	5	Ret	**9**	5	6	3	**1**	5	**1**	129
3	(Morocco) Mehdi Bennani	2	2	NC	2	4	1	1	3	1	3	2	2	NC	8	3	**1**	1	4	2	Ret	128.5
4	(Argentina) Esteban Guerrieri	1	7	3	3	3	3	4	5	Ret	4	3	**1**	1	2							85
5	(France) Yann Ehrlacher	Ret	6	8	4	5	4	6	6	4	6	1	4	2	5	2	2	7	9	8	6	80
6	(Netherlands) Tom Coronel	4	3	4	6	6	5	5	4	DNS	DNS	7	6	6	6	7	8	2	3	6	5	68.5
7	(France) John Filippi	NC	5	5	5	10	7	7	7	5	5	6	7	3	3	6	4	6	10	4	4	61
8	(United States) Kevin Gleason			6	8	8	8	8	8	Ret	7	8	8	4	4	4	3	5	5	3	8	45.5
9	(Hungary) Dániel Nagy	6†	8	7	Ret	9	Ret	10	Ret	8	8	9	9	DSQ	DSQ	9	9	10	7	9	7	13
10	(Switzerland) Kris Richard															8	7			7	3	11
11	(France) Aurélien Panis	5	Ret	DNS	7	7	9	9	9	6	10†											11
12	(Macau) Filipe de Souza													5	7	10	10					5
13	(Hungary) Zsolt Szabó											10	10	DSQ	DSQ	11	11	10	6	10	9	3
14	(China) Ma Qinghua																	8	8			3
15	(Portugal) Manuel Fernandes									7	9											2
16	(Macau) Mak Ka Lok																	11	12			0
17	(Hong Kong) Wong Po Wah																	12	DNS			0
-	(Hong Kong) Chan Kin Pong																	WD	WD			0

**Bold** – Pole
Italics – Fastest Lap

† – Drivers did not finish the race, but were classified as they completed over 75% of the race distance.

==== WTCC Teams' Trophy ====
All the teams taking part in the championship were eligible to score points towards the Teams' Trophy, with the exception of manufacturer teams, with the first car from each team scoring points in each race on the following scale: 10-8-6-5-4-3-2-1.

Pos.	Team	MAR (Morocco)		ITA (Italy)		HUN (Hungary)		GER (Germany)		PRT (Portugal)		ARG (Argentina)		CHN (China)		JPN (Japan)		MAC (Macau)		QAT (Qatar)		Pts.
1	(France) Sébastien Loeb Racing	2	1	1	2	1	1	1	2	1	2	2	2	3	1	1	1	1	2	1	2	175
2	(Germany) ALL-INKL.COM Münnich Motorsport	Ret	3	2	1	2	5	2	1	2	1	4	4	Ret	5	3	3	3	1	3	1	128
3	(Spain) Campos Racing	1	5	3	3	3	2	3	4	Ret	3	3	1	1	2	5	4	6	DNS	5	3	109
4	(France) RC Motorsport	Ret	4	5	4	4	3	5	5	3	4	1	3	2	3	2	2	4	4	2	5	109
5	(Italy) ROAL Motorsport	3	2	4	5	5	4	4	3	DNS	DNS	5	5	4	4	4	5	2	3	4	4	91.5
6	(Hungary) Zengő Motorsport	4	6	6	6	6	6	6	6	4	5	6	6	DSQ	DSQ	6	6	5	5	6	6	61

== See also ==
- 2017 European Touring Car Cup
