= FIA WTCC Race of Qatar =

Motor racing meeting

- Losail International Circuit (2015–2017)

Race information
- Number of times held: 3
- First held: 2015
- Last held: 2017
- Most wins (drivers): 6 different winners
- Most wins (constructors): (France) Citroën (4)

Last race (2017)
- Race 1 Winner: (United Kingdom) Tom Chilton; (Sébastien Loeb Racing)
- Race 2 Winner: (Argentina) Esteban Guerrieri; (Honda Racing Team JAS)

The FIA WTCC Race of Qatar was a round of the World Touring Car Championship held at the Losail International Circuit located in Lusail, Qatar.

The race made its debut in the World Touring Car Championship as the 12th round of the 2015 World Touring Car Championship season.

== Winners ==
Year	Race	Driver	Manufacturer	Location	Report
2017	Opening Race	(United Kingdom) Tom Chilton	(France) Citroën	Losail International Circuit	Report
2017	Main Race	(Argentina) Esteban Guerrieri	(Japan) Honda	Losail International Circuit	Report
2016	Opening Race	(Italy) Gabriele Tarquini	(Russia) Lada	Losail International Circuit	Report
2016	Main Race	(Morocco) Mehdi Bennani	(France) Citroën	Losail International Circuit	Report
2015	Race 1	(Argentina) José María López	(France) Citroën	Losail International Circuit	Report
2015	Race 2	(France) Yvan Muller	(France) Citroën	Losail International Circuit	Report
