= Mehdi Bennani =

Moroccan racing driver (born 1983)

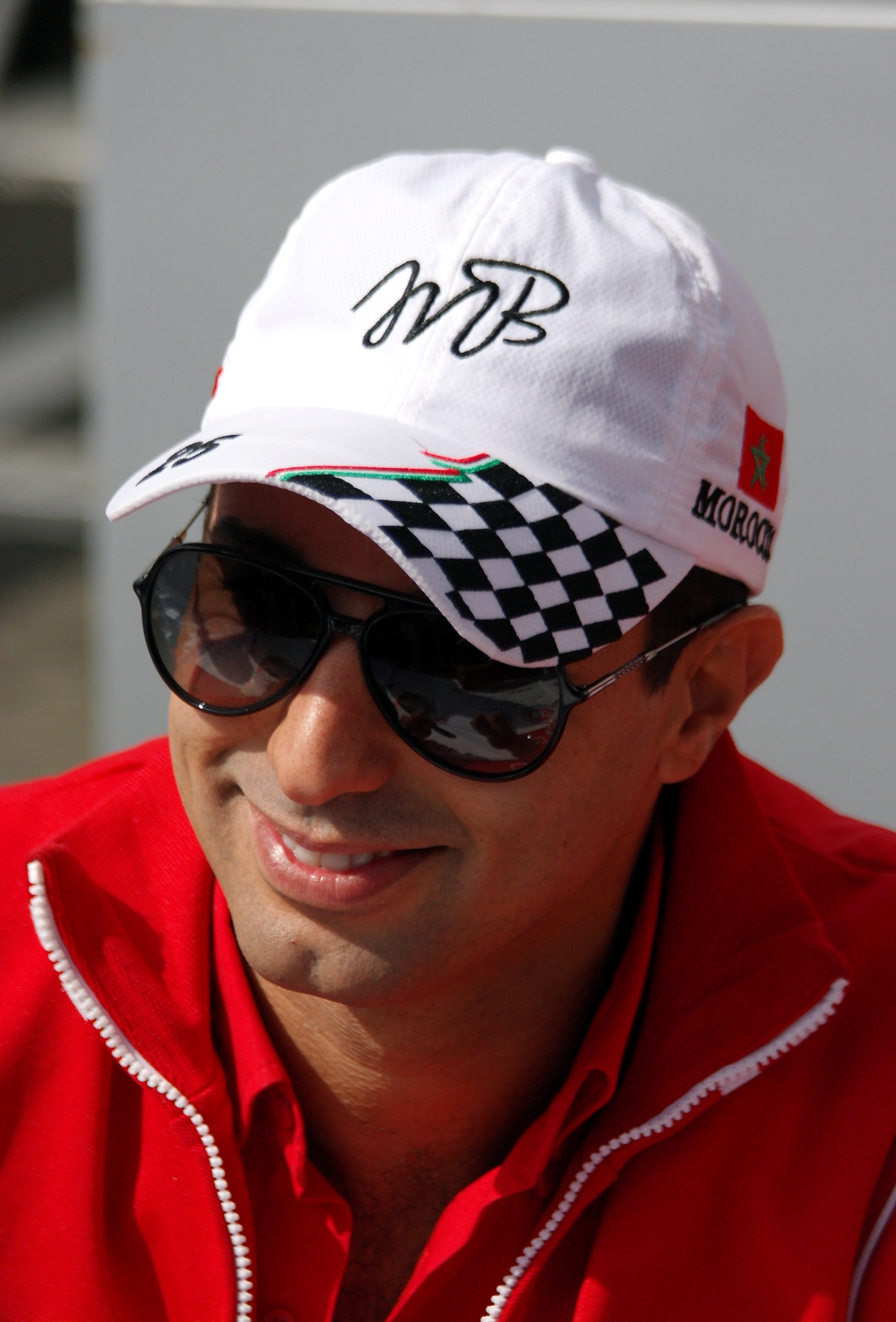
- Bennani at the 2014 FIA WTCC Race of Belgium.
- Nationality: (Morocco) Moroccan
- Born: 25 August 1983 (age 43) Fez, Morocco

World Touring Car Championship career
- Debut season: 2009
- Current team: Sébastien Loeb Racing
- Categorisation: FIA Gold
- Car number: 25
- Former teams: Comtoyou Racing; Proteam Racing; Wiechers-Sport; Exagon Engineering
- Starts: 191
- Wins: 6
- Poles: 1
- Fastest laps: 3
- Best finish: 5th in 2016

Previous series
- 2009 2007 2007 2005–2006 2004: Formula Le Mans; Euroseries 3000; Italian Formula 3000; Formula Renault 3.5 Series; Formula BMW Asia

Championship titles
- 2020 2016: TCR Europe Touring Car Series; WTCC Independents' Trophy

Mehdi Bennani (Arabic: مهدي بناني, born 25 August 1983) is a Moroccan racing driver who currently competes in the TCR Europe with Sébastien Loeb Racing. He was TCR Europe Champion in 2020 with the Belgian team Comtoyou Racing.

Bennani became the first Moroccan driver to win a world championship race organized by the FIA, after his victory in Shanghai in the WTCC.

== Racing career ==
=== Early career ===
Like most racing drivers, Bennani started out in karting, winning his national championship in 2001. He finished as runner-up in the European Karting Championship in the 100 ICA class. He also won the Moroccan Fiat Palio Trophy in 2001. He moved into single-seaters and was runner-up in Formula BMW Asia in 2004. He moved to the Formula Renault 3.5 Series in 2005 with the Avalon Formula team, racing against the likes of Robert Kubica and Will Power. He also competed for EuroInternational in 2006, but failed to score a point in his time in the series. He competed in Euroseries 3000 in 2007, finishing 14th in the final standings and scored a best result of fourth. In 2008, he competed in the Pau Historical Grand Prix, where he finished second.

=== World Touring Car Championship ===
==== Exagon Engineering (2009) ====
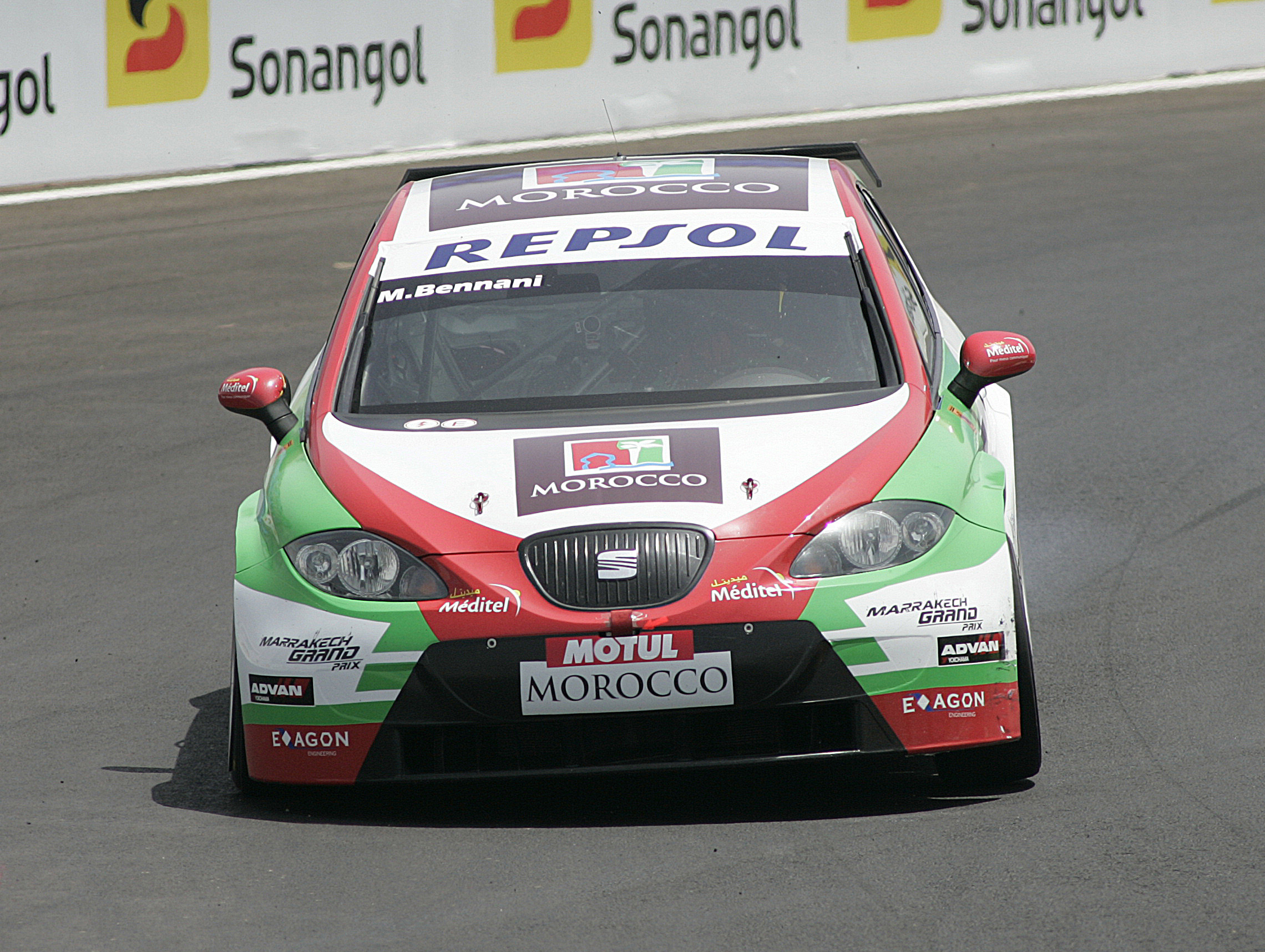
Bennani driving for Exagon Engineering at the 2009 FIA WTCC Race of Morocco.

In May 2009, Bennani competed in his home round of the World Touring Car Championship, the Race of Morocco at the Marrakech Street Circuit in a SEAT León 2.0 TFSI prepared by Exagon Engineering. He was backed by OMNT, Morocco's Tourism Office. He became the first North African to race in the WTCC, on the series' first visit to the African continent. He qualified in 14th place for the first race, and finished in ninth place, winner of the Independent's category. He finished ninth in the second race, and impressed throughout the weekend with the way he was able to keep up with WTCC regulars. He competed at four further race weekends for Exagon. At the Race of Portugal, he collided with the stranded car of Alain Menu on the narrow street circuit; he was later disqualified from the final classification.

==== Wiechers-Sport (2010) ====
In 2010, Bennani drove a BMW 320si for the Wiechers-Sport team. The season yielded just three points and 20th place in the drivers standings.

==== Proteam Racing (2011–2014) ====
Bennani moved to Proteam Racing for 2011 to drive one of their new BMW 320 TCs. His best result of the season was a 6th place in the final race at Macau.

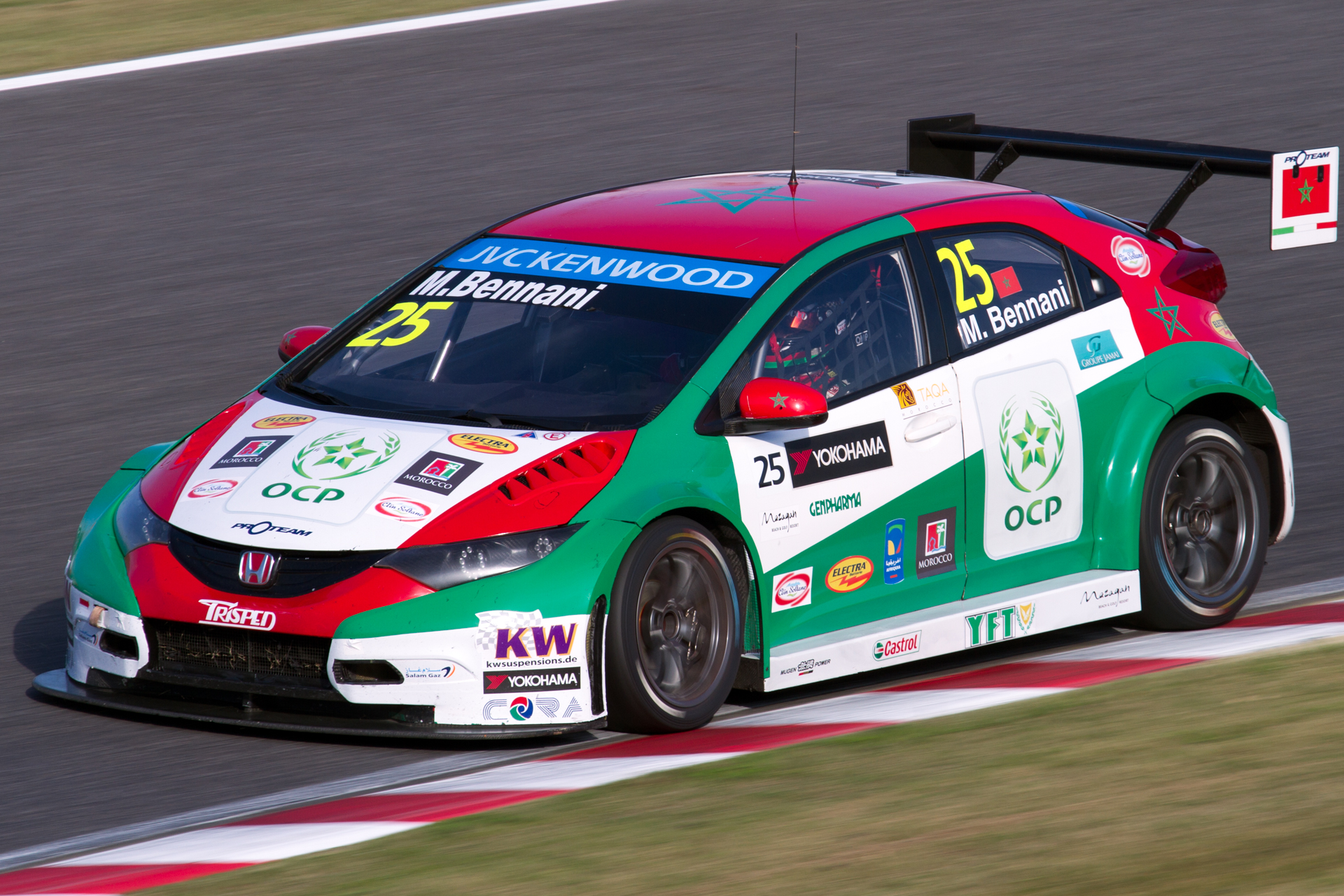
Bennani competing in the 2014 World Touring Car Championship

Bennani stayed on at Proteam for 2012. He was joined at the team by Isaac Tutumlu until he left after the Race of Slovakia, reducing the team to one car for Bennani. He took a career best fourth-place finish in race one at the Race of Hungary. He bettered this with his maiden podium finish in race two, finishing in third place. A collision with Stefano D'Aste at the Race of Portugal earned him a suspended grid penalty. He started second for race two of the Race of the United States and inherited the lead from D'Aste halfway around the first lap when D'Aste spun off. He held the lead until lap four when he spun off and damaged his car, forcing him to retire and passing the lead to Franz Engstler. Race one of the Race of Japan saw Aleksei Dudukalo collide with Bennani who then returned to the pits for repairs. For the second race, Bennani held off the Chevrolet trio for much of the race before being passed in the lap two laps. He was caught up in a first corner crash in race one of the Race of Macau in which a number of cars piled into the Lisboa corner on the first lap and blocked the track. Bennani's car was stuck across the track and was lifted out of the way before the race resumed. He finished the season tenth in the drivers' championship tied on points with Alex MacDowall but ranked ahead due to his podium in Hungary.

Bennani stayed with Proteam for the 2013 season, driving their BMW 320 TC for the third consecutive year., Mehdi finished 12th, fourth of the independents. After a difficult season with bad mechanical luck and an unresponsive car, Mehdi eschewed the BMW for a Honda Civic.

In 2014, Bennani scored his first WTCC win at the championship's Shanghai round. Bennani went on to finish the season in 11th place.

==== Sebastian Loeb Racing (2015–2019) ====
For 2015, Bennani signed with Sébastien Loeb Racing, switching to a 2014-spec Citroën C-Elysée WTCC for his first season with the team.

==== 2016 ====
For 2016, Bennani had two teammates, Tom Chilton and Gregoire Demoustier.

== Racing record ==
=== Career summary ===
Season	Series	Team	Races	Wins	Poles	F.Laps	Podiums	Points	Position
2002	Formula Renault Campus France	?	?	?	?	?	?	21	14th
2004	Formula BMW Asia	Team Meritus	14	0	0	?	6	124	**3rd**
2005	Formula Renault 3.5 Series	Avelon Formula	14	0	0	0	0	0	NC
2006	Formula Renault 3.5 Series	EuroInternational	2	0	0	0	0	0	NC
2007	Euroseries 3000	ELK Motorsport	12	0	0	0	0	9	14th
2007	F3000 Italia	ELK Motorsport	6	0	0	0	0	3	14th
2008	24H Series - A6	Duller Motorsport	1	0	0	0	0	8	13th
2009	World Touring Car Championship	Exagon Engineering	9	0	0	0	0	0	NC
2009	World Touring Car Championship - Independent's Trophy	Exagon Engineering	9	1	0	3	2	30	8th
2009	Formula Le Mans Cup	Exagon Engineering	2	0	0	0	0	13	23rd
2009	Moroccan Circuit Racing Championship - M2A	?	5	5	?	?	5	50	**1st**
2010	World Touring Car Championship	Wiechers-Sport	22	0	0	0	0	3	19th
2010	World Touring Car Championship - Independent's Trophy	Wiechers-Sport	22	1	0	1	5	91	5th
2011	World Touring Car Championship	Proteam Racing	24	0	0	0	0	24	16th
2011	World Touring Car Championship - Independent's Trophy	Proteam Racing	14	0	0	1	1	27	8th
2011	European Touring Car Cup	Proteam Racing	2	0	0	0	0	6	5th
2012	World Touring Car Championship	Proteam Racing	24	0	0	0	1	68	10th
2012	World Touring Car Championship - Independent's Trophy	Proteam Racing	24	1	1	1	7	73	7th
2013	World Touring Car Championship	Proteam Racing	24	0	0	1	3	80	12th
2013	World Touring Car Championship - Independent's Trophy	Proteam Racing	24	4	0	4	7	102	4th
2014	World Touring Car Championship	Proteam Racing	21	1	0	0	2	85	11th
2015	World Touring Car Championship	Sébastien Loeb Racing	24	0	0	0	0	127	8th
2015	World Touring Car Championship - Independent's Trophy	Sébastien Loeb Racing	24	7	3	8	15	145	**2nd**
2016	World Touring Car Championship	Sébastien Loeb Racing	22	2	2	1	5	206	5th
2017	World Touring Car Championship	Sébastien Loeb Racing	20	3	0	1	7	234	6th
2018	World Touring Car Cup	Sébastien Loeb Racing	28	1	0	1	3	155	12th
2019	World Touring Car Cup	Sébastien Loeb Racing	30	0	0	2	0	40	25th
2019	VLN Series - Cup 5	Team Mathol Racing e.V.	1	0	0	0	0	0.88	122nd
2020	TCR Europe Touring Car Series	Comtoyou Racing	12	0	2	0	3	285	**1st**
2020	TCR Ibérico Touring Car Series	Comtoyou Racing	?	0	0	0	0	25	9th
2021	TCR Europe Touring Car Series	Sébastien Loeb Racing	14	1	0	0	3	252	5th
2022	World Touring Car Cup	Comtoyou Team Audi Sport	14	0	1	0	1	112	11th
2024	TCR World Tour	Team Clairet Sport	2	0	0	0	0	14	20th

=== Complete Formula Renault 3.5 Series results ===
(key) (Races in bold indicate pole position) (Races in italics indicate fastest lap)

Year	Entrant	1	2	3	4	5	6	7	8	9	10	11	12	13	14	15	16	17	DC	Points
2005	Avelon Formula	ZOL; 1	ZOL; 2	MON; 1 Ret	VAL; 1 Ret	VAL; 2; 18	LMS; 1; 21	LMS; 2; 18	BIL; 1 DNQ	BIL; 2 Ret	OSC; 1; 13	OSC; 2; 16	DON; 1; 18	DON; 2; 17	EST; 1; 23	EST; 2; 21	MNZ; 1; 19†	MNZ; 2; 21	33rd	0
2006	Eurointernational	ZOL; 1	ZOL; 2	MON; 1 DNQ	IST; 1	IST; 2	MIS; 1	MIS; 2	SPA; 1	SPA; 2	NÜR; 1	NÜR; 2	DON; 1	DON; 2	LMS; 1 Ret	LMS; 2; 19	CAT; 1	CAT; 2	43rd	0

=== Complete World Touring Car Championship results ===
(key) (Races in bold indicate pole position) (Races in italics indicate fastest lap)

Year	Team	Car	1	2	3	4	5	6	7	8	9	10	11	12	13	14	15	16	17	18	19	20	21	22	23	24	DC	Points
2009	Exagon Engineering	SEAT León TFSI	BRA; 1	BRA; 2	MEX; 1	MEX; 2	MAR; 1; 9	MAR; 2; 9	FRA; 1; 18	FRA; 2 Ret	ESP; 1; 14	ESP; 2; 23	CZE; 1	CZE; 2	POR; 1 DSQ	POR; 2 Ret	GBR; 1	GBR; 2	GER; 1	GER; 2	ITA; 1; 13	ITA; 2 Ret	JPN; 1	JPN; 2	MAC; 1	MAC; 2	NC	0
2010	Wiechers-Sport	BMW 320si	BRA; 1; 18	BRA; 2; 12	MAR; 1; 15	MAR; 2; 9	ITA; 1; 14	ITA; 2; 17	BEL; 1; 14	BEL; 2; 19	POR; 1 Ret	POR; 2; 12	GBR; 1; 19	GBR; 2 Ret	CZE; 1; 14	CZE; 2; 16	GER; 1; 14	GER; 2 Ret	ESP; 1 Ret	ESP; 2; 16	JPN; 1; 16	JPN; 2; 19	MAC; 1; 10	MAC; 2; 12			20th	3
2011	Proteam Racing	BMW 320 TC	BRA; 1; 10	BRA; 2 Ret	BEL; 1 Ret	BEL; 2; 11	ITA; 1; 11	ITA; 2; 20	HUN; 1; 14	**HUN**; **2**; 14	CZE; 1; 11	CZE; 2; 10	POR; 1; 16	POR; 2; 18	GBR; 1; 14	GBR; 2; 9	GER; 1; 11	GER; 2 Ret	ESP; 1 Ret	ESP; 2; 12	JPN; 1; 8	JPN; 2; 18	CHN; 1; 7	CHN; 2; 11	MAC; 1; 9	MAC; 2; 6	16th	24
2012	Proteam Racing	BMW 320 TC	ITA; 1 Ret	ITA; 2; 14	ESP; 1; 14	ESP; 2; 10	MAR; 1 Ret	MAR; 2; 12	SVK; 1; 11	SVK; 2; 7	HUN; 1; 4	HUN; 2; 3	AUT; 1; 17	AUT; 2; 6	POR; 1 Ret	POR; 2 Ret	BRA; 1; 13	BRA; 2; 8	USA; 1; 11	USA; 2 Ret	JPN; 1; 21	JPN; 2; 7	CHN; 1; 8	CHN; 2; 5	MAC; 1 Ret	MAC; 2 Ret	10th	68
2013	Proteam Racing	BMW 320 TC	ITA; 1; 17	ITA; 2; 19	MAR; 1; 18	MAR; 2; 11	SVK; 1; 10	SVK; 2; 9	HUN; 1; 5	HUN; 2; 2	AUT; 1; 4	AUT; 2; 16	RUS; 1; 11	**RUS**; **2**; 16	POR; 1 Ret	POR; 2; 10	ARG; 1; 20	ARG; 2; 21†	USA; 1; 18	**USA**; **2**; 2	JPN; 1; 11	**JPN**; **2**; 2	CHN; 1; 16	CHN; 2; 14	MAC; 1; 12	MAC; 2 Ret	12th	80
2014	Proteam Racing	Honda Civic WTCC	MAR; 1; 7	MAR; 2 DSQ	FRA; 1; 13	**FRA**; **2**; 5	HUN; 1; 5	HUN; 2 DNS	SVK; 1; 15	SVK; 2 C	AUT; 1; 7	AUT; 2; 8	RUS; 1; 11	RUS; 2; 3	BEL; 1; 13	BEL; 2; 11	ARG; 1; 9	ARG; 2; 8	BEI; 1; 9	BEI; 2 Ret	CHN; 1; 10	**CHN**; **2**; 1	JPN; 1; 11	JPN; 2 Ret	MAC; 1; 19†	MAC; 2 DNS	11th	85
2015	Sébastien Loeb Racing	Citroën C-Elysée WTCC	ARG; 1; 13	ARG; 2; 5	MAR; 1; 4	MAR; 2; 12	HUN; 1; 11	HUN; 2 Ret	GER; 1; 7	GER; 2; 6	RUS; 1; 14	RUS; 2 Ret	SVK; 1 Ret	SVK; 2; 7	FRA; 1; 9	**FRA**; **2**; 9	POR; 1; 11	POR; 2; 10	JPN; 1; 7	JPN; 2; 10	CHN; 1; 5	CHN; 2; 7	THA; 1; 4	THA; 2; 7	QAT; 1; 2	QAT; 2; 5	8th	127
2016	Sébastien Loeb Racing	Citroën C-Elysée WTCC	FRA; 1; 2	FRA; 2; 8	SVK; 1; 2	SVK; 2; 6	**HUN**; **1**; 1	HUN; 2; 8	MAR; 1; 6	MAR; 2; 5	GER; 1; 5	GER; 2; 5	RUS; 1; 9	RUS; 2; 10	POR; 1; 4	POR; 2; 8	ARG; 1; 8	ARG; 2; 7	JPN; 1; 16	JPN; 2; 4	CHN; 1; 11	CHN; 2; 3	QAT; 1; 16	**QAT**; **2**; 1			5th	206
2017	Sébastien Loeb Racing	Citroën C-Elysée WTCC	MAR; 1; 3	MAR; 2; 6	ITA; 1 NC	ITA; 2; 7	HUN; 1; 7	HUN; 2; 1	GER; 1; 2	GER; 2; 6	POR; 1; 1	POR; 2; 7	ARG; 1; 2	ARG; 2; 5	CHN; 1 NC	CHN; 2; 11	JPN; 1; 5	JPN; 2; 6	**MAC**; **1**; 1	MAC; 2; 7	QAT; 1; 2	QAT; 2 Ret					6th	234

^{†} Driver did not finish the race, but was classified as he completed over 90% of the race distance.

=== Complete World Touring Car Cup results ===
(key) (Races in bold indicate pole position) (Races in italics indicate fastest lap)

Year	Team	Car	1	2	3	4	5	6	7	8	9	10	11	12	13	14	15	16	17	18	19	20	21	22	23	24	25	26	27	28	29	30	DC	Points
2018	Sébastien Loeb Racing	Volkswagen Golf GTI TCR	MAR; 1; 9	MAR; 2; 2	MAR; 3; 6	HUN; 1; 10	HUN; 2; 7	HUN; 3; 17	GER; 1; 13	GER; 2; 10	GER; 3; 9	NED; 1; 8	NED; 2; 5	NED; 3; 8	POR; 1 Ret	POR; 2 DNS	POR; 3 DNS	SVK; 1; 21	SVK; 2 Ret	SVK; 3 Ret	CHN; 1; 5	CHN; 2; 2	CHN; 3; 10	WUH; 1; 13	WUH; 2; 1	WUH; 3; 9	JPN; 1; 5	JPN; 2; 8	JPN; 3; 4	MAC; 1; 15	MAC; 2; 10	MAC; 3 Ret	12th	155
2019	SLR VW Motorsport	Volkswagen Golf GTI TCR	MAR; 1 Ret	MAR; 2 Ret	MAR; 3; 12	HUN; 1; 16	HUN; 2 Ret	HUN; 3; 15	SVK; 1 Ret	SVK; 2; 14	SVK; 3; 19	NED; 1; 6	NED; 2; 16	NED; 3; 13	GER; 1; 15	GER; 2; 16	GER; 3; 16	POR; 1; 20	POR; 2; 19	POR; 3; 13	CHN; 1; 20	CHN; 2; 11	CHN; 3; 14	JPN; 1; 24	JPN; 2; 27	JPN; 3 Ret	MAC; 1; 17	MAC; 2 Ret	MAC; 3; 18	MAL; 1; 12	MAL; 2; 13	MAL; 3; 17	25th	40
2022	Comtoyou Team Audi Sport	Audi RS 3 LMS TCR	FRA; 1; 10	FRA; 2 Ret	**GER**; **1** C	GER; 2 C	HUN; 1; 13	HUN; 2 Ret	ESP; 1; 10	ESP; 2; 9	POR; 1; 7	POR; 2; 6	ITA; 1; 10	ITA; 2; 9	ALS; 1; 11	ALS; 2; 2	BHR; 1; 7	BHR; 2; 8	SAU; 1	SAU; 2													11th	112

=== Complete TCR Europe Touring Car Series results ===
(key) (Races in bold indicate pole position) (Races in italics indicate fastest lap)

Year	Team	Car	1	2	3	4	5	6	7	8	9	10	11	12	13	14	DC	Points
2020	Comtoyou Racing	Audi RS 3 LMS TCR	LEC; 1; 2^{2}	LEC; 2; 5	ZOL; 1 Ret^{3}	ZOL; 2; 5	**MNZ**; **1** Ret^{1}	MNZ; 2; 8	CAT; 1; 5^{5}	CAT; 2; 3	**SPA**; **1**; 6^{1}	SPA; 2; 16	JAR; 1; 4^{4}	JAR; 2; 2			1st	285
2021	Sébastien Loeb Racing	Hyundai Elantra N TCR	SVK; 1; 6	SVK; 2; 1	LEC; 1; 18	LEC; 2; 6	ZAN; 1; 12	ZAN; 2; 6	SPA; 1; 2	SPA; 2; 9	NÜR; 1; 11	NÜR; 2; 14	MNZ; 1; 21	MNZ; 2; 12	CAT; 1; 10	CAT; 2; 2	5th	252

=== Complete TCR World Tour results ===
(key) (Races in bold indicate pole position) (Races in italics indicate fastest lap)

Year	Team	Car	1	2	3	4	5	6	7	8	9	10	11	12	13	14	DC	Points
2024	Team Clairet Sport	Cupra León VZ TCR	VAL; 1	VAL; 2	MRK; 1; 11	MRK; 2; 10	MOH; 1	MOH; 2	SAP; 1	SAP; 2	ELP; 1	ELP; 2	ZHZ; 1	ZHZ; 2	MAC; 1	MAC; 2	20th	14

Sporting positions
Preceded by Norbert Michelisz	World Touring Car Championship; Independents' Trophy winner 2016	Succeeded by Tom Chilton
Preceded by Josh Files	TCR Europe Touring Car Series; Champion; 2020	Succeeded by Mikel Azcona
