= 2017 European Touring Car Cup =

Motorsport contest

The 2017 FIA European Touring Car Cup was the thirteenth and last running of the FIA European Touring Car Cup. It consists of six events in Italy, Hungary, Germany, Portugal, Belgium and Czech Republic. The championship is again split into two categories: ETCC 1 (including TC2 Turbo, TC2, TCN-2 and Super 2000 machinery) and ETCC 2 (including Super 1600 machinery).

== Teams and drivers ==
The races at the Nürburgring had both WTCC and ETCC competitors. ETCC competitors entered with their usual car numbers, but with 100 added up to it.

ETCC 1
| Team | Car | No. | Drivers | Rounds |
|---|---|---|---|---|
| (Hungary) Zengő Motorsport | SEAT León TCR | 5 | (Hungary) Anett György | All |
| (Hungary) Zengő Motorsport | SEAT León TCR | 8 | (Hungary) Norbert Nagy | All |
| (Hungary) Zengő Motorsport | SEAT León TCR | 66 | (Hungary) Zsolt Szabó | 1–4 |
| (Germany) Pfister Racing | SEAT León TCR | 7 | (Germany) Andreas Pfister | All |
| (Switzerland) Rikli Motorsport | Honda Civic Type R TCR | 12 | (Switzerland) Peter Rikli | All |
| (Switzerland) Rikli Motorsport | Honda Civic Type R TCR | 91 | (Switzerland) Christjohannes Schreiber | All |
| (North Macedonia) AKK Stefanovski | SEAT León TCR | 14 | (North Macedonia) Igor Stefanovski | All |
| (Serbia) LEIN Racing | SEAT León TCR | 17 | (Serbia) Mladen Lalušić | 1–4, 6 |
| (Serbia) LEIN Racing | SEAT León TCR | 37 | (Portugal) Fábio Mota | All |
| (Czech Republic) Křenek Motorsport | SEAT León TCR | 22 | (Czech Republic) Petr Fulín | All |
| (Germany) Steibel Motorsport | Volkswagen Golf GTI TCR | 23 | (Czech Republic) Václav Nimč Jr. | 6 |
| (Italy) Target Competition | Honda Civic Type R TCR | 27 | (Portugal) José Rodrigues | 4 |
| (Serbia) ASK GM Racing | Audi RS 3 LMS TCR | 32 | (Serbia) Rudolf Pešović | 2, 5 |
| (Bulgaria) Kraf Racing | Audi RS 3 LMS TCR | 44 | (Bulgaria) Plamen Kralev | All |
| (Slovenia) Lema Racing | SEAT León TCR | 71 | (Poland) Maciej Łaszkiewicz | 6 |
| (Slovenia) Lema Racing | SEAT León TCR | 76 | (Czech Republic) Petr Čížek | 6 |
| (Spain) Baporo Motorsport | SEAT Leon TCR | 73 | (Kazakhstan) Alexandr Artemyev | 2 |
| (Czech Republic) Fullin Race Academy | SEAT León TCR | 96 | (Czech Republic) Petr Fulín Jr. | 6 |

== Race calendar and results ==
The first four rounds will support the World Touring Car Championship.

| Round | | Circuit | Date | Pole position | Fastest lap | Winning driver | Winning team |
|---|---|---|---|---|---|---|---|
| 1 | R1 | (Italy) Autodromo Nazionale Monza | 30 April | (Switzerland) Peter Rikli | (Switzerland) Christjohannes Schreiber | (Czech Republic) Petr Fulín | (Czech Republic) Křenek Motorsport |
| 1 | R2 | (Italy) Autodromo Nazionale Monza | 30 April | | (Switzerland) Peter Rikli | (Switzerland) Christjohannes Schreiber | (Switzerland) Rikli Motorsport |
| 2 | R1 | (Hungary) Hungaroring | 14 May | (Hungary) Zsolt Szabó | (Hungary) Zsolt Szabó | (Switzerland) Christjohannes Schreiber | (Switzerland) Rikli Motorsport |
| 2 | R2 | (Hungary) Hungaroring | 14 May | | (Hungary) Norbert Nagy | (Switzerland) Christjohannes Schreiber | (Switzerland) Rikli Motorsport |
| 3 | R1 | (Germany) Nürburgring Nordschleife | 27 May | (Switzerland) Christjohannes Schreiber | (Czech Republic) Petr Fulín | (Czech Republic) Petr Fulín | (Czech Republic) Křenek Motorsport |
| 3 | R2 | (Germany) Nürburgring Nordschleife | 27 May | | (Portugal) Fábio Mota | (North Macedonia) Igor Stefanovski | (North Macedonia) AKK Stefanovski |
| 4 | R1 | (Portugal) Circuito Internacional de Vila Real | 25 June | (Hungary) Norbert Nagy | (North Macedonia) Igor Stefanovski | (Czech Republic) Petr Fulín | (Czech Republic) Křenek Motorsport |
| 4 | R2 | (Portugal) Circuito Internacional de Vila Real | 25 June | | (Hungary) Zsolt Szabó | (Hungary) Zsolt Szabó | (Hungary) Zengő Motorsport |
| 5 | R1 | (Belgium) Circuit Zolder | 17 September | (Hungary) Norbert Nagy | (Switzerland) Christjohannes Schreiber | (Switzerland) Christjohannes Schreiber | (Switzerland) Rikli Motorsport |
| 5 | R2 | (Belgium) Circuit Zolder | 17 September | | (North Macedonia) Igor Stefanovski | (North Macedonia) Igor Stefanovski | (North Macedonia) AKK Stefanovski |
| 6 | R1 | (Czech Republic) Autodrom Most | 8 October | (Hungary) Norbert Nagy | (Bulgaria) Plamen Kralev | (Hungary) Norbert Nagy | (Hungary) Zengő Motorsport |
| 6 | R2 | (Czech Republic) Autodrom Most | 8 October | | (Czech Republic) Petr Fulín | (Czech Republic) Petr Fulín | (Czech Republic) Křenek Motorsport |

== Championship standings ==
Points were awarded to the top eight classified finishers using the following structure:

| Position | **1st** | **2nd** | **3rd** | **4th** | **5th** | **6th** | **7th** | **8th** |
| Points | 10 | 8 | 6 | 5 | 4 | 3 | 2 | 1 |

Qualifying points: ^{1} ^{2} ^{3} refers to the classification of the drivers after the qualifying for first race, where bonus points are awarded 3–2–1.

| Pos | Driver | MNZ (Italy) | | HUN (Hungary) | | NÜR (Germany) | | VIL^{†} (Portugal) | | ZOL (Belgium) | | MST (Czech Republic) | | Pts |
| Pos | Driver | RD1 | RD2 | RD1 | RD2 | RD1 | RD2 | RD1 | RD2 | RD1 | RD2 | RD1 | RD2 | Pts |
|---|---|---|---|---|---|---|---|---|---|---|---|---|---|---|
| 1 | (Czech Republic) Petr Fulín | 1^{3} | 3 | 6 | 4 | 1^{2} | 3 | 1^{2} | 5 | 9 | 3 | 2^{3} | 1 | 82 |
| 2 | (Hungary) Norbert Nagy | 5 | 4 | 3^{2} | 3 | 4 | 5 | **2**^{1} | Ret | **3**^{1} | 4 | **1**^{1} | 3 | 75 |
| 3 | (Switzerland) Christjohannes Schreiber | 2^{2} | 1 | 1 ^{3} | 1 | **Ret**^{1} | DNS | NC | 11 | 1 | 7 | 3^{2} | Ret | 65 |
| 4 | (North Macedonia) Igor Stefanovski | 4 | 5 | 4 | 8 | 2 | 1 | 3 | 3 | 8^{2} | 1 | 8 | 5 | 60 |
| 5 | (Switzerland) Peter Rikli | **3**^{1} | 2 | 5 | 10 | 5 | Ret | 9 | 8 | 2 | 2 | 5 | 12 | 45.5 |
| 6 | (Portugal) Fábio Mota | 9 | 8 | 7 | 11 | 3^{3} | 2 | 5 | 7 | 4^{3} | 9 | DSQ | 7 | 31 |
| 7 | (Bulgaria) Plamen Kralev | 10 | 6 | 13 | DNS | 9 | 6 | 8 | 2 | Ret | 8 | 4 | 2 | 25 |
| 8 | (Germany) Andreas Pfister | 7 | 7 | 11 | 6 | 8 | 4 | 11 | 6 | 5 | 5 | 12 | 8 | 23.5 |
| 9 | (Hungary) Zsolt Szabó | 6 | Ret | **2**^{1} | Ret | 10 | 7 | 7 | 1 | | | | | 23 |
| 10 | (Serbia) Mladen Lalušić | 8 | Ret | 8 | 5 | 6 | 8 | 6 | 9 | | | 9 | DSQ | 13 |
| 11 | (Portugal) José Rodrigues | | | | | | | 4^{3} | 4 | | | | | 8.5 |
| 12 | (Kazakhstan) Alexandr Artemyev | | | 10 | 2 | | | | | | | | | 8 |
| 13 | (Czech Republic) Petr Fulín Jr. | | | | | | | | | | | 6 | 4 | 8 |
| 14 | (Hungary) Anett György | DNS | DNS | 9 | 9 | 7 | Ret | 10 | 10 | 7 | 7 | Ret | 9 | 6 |
| 15 | (Serbia) Rudolf Pešović | | | 12 | 7 | | | | | 6 | Ret | | | 5 |
| 16 | (Czech Republic) Václav Nimč Jr. | | | | | | | | | | | 7 | 6 | 5 |
| 17 | (Czech Republic) Petr Čížek | | | | | | | | | | | 10 | 10 | 0 |
| 18 | (Poland) Maciej Łaszkiewicz | | | | | | | | | | | 11 | 11 | 0 |
| Pos | Driver | MNZ (Italy) | | HUN (Hungary) | | NÜR (Germany) | | VIL^{†} (Portugal) | | ZOL (Belgium) | | MST (Czech Republic) | | Pts |

| Colour | Result |
|---|---|
| Gold | Winner |
| Silver | Second place |
| Bronze | Third place |
| Green | Points classification |
| Blue | Non-points classification |
| Blue | Non-classified finish (NC) |
| Purple | Retired, not classified (Ret) |
| Red | Did not qualify (DNQ) |
| Red | Did not pre-qualify (DNPQ) |
| Black | Disqualified (DSQ) |
| White | Did not start (DNS) |
| White | Withdrew (WD) |
| White | Race cancelled (C) |
| Blank | Did not practice (DNP) |
| Blank | Did not arrive (DNA) |
| Blank | Excluded (EX) |

**Bold** – Pole
Italics – Fastest Lap

† - Half points were awarded for race 2 at Vila Real.
