= 2016 World Touring Car Championship =

Motorsport contest

Champions
- World Drivers' Champion: José María López
- World Manufacturers' Champion: Citroën

Seasons
- ← 2015 2017 →

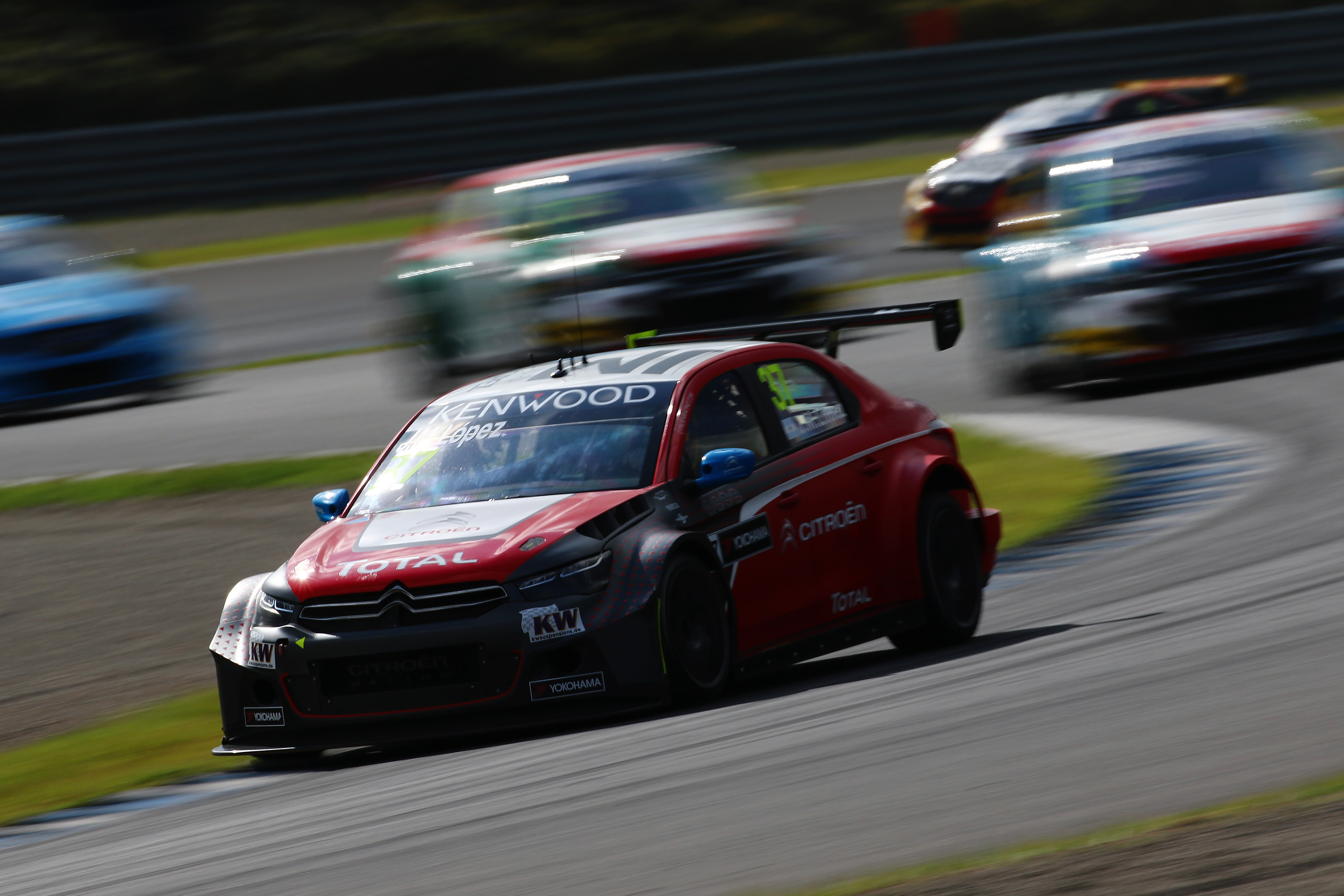
José María López won the Drivers' championship.

The 2016 World Touring Car Championship was the thirteenth season of the FIA World Touring Car Championship, and the twelfth since the series was revived in 2005.

In 2016 a new manufacturer Polestar (with Volvo S60) entered while Citroën reduced the number of official entries to two, and announced their retirement in 2017. A new team time trial format was introduced for manufacturers, titled Manufacturers Against the Clock (MAC3), consisting in three cars per manufacturer completing two laps at the same time (only one lap at the Nürburgring) against the clock, whereby the total time of the last car determines the result. The cars must finish in a 15 seconds gap.

== Teams and drivers ==
Team	Car	No.	Drivers	Rounds
Manufacturer entries
(Russia) Lada Sport Rosneft	Lada Vesta WTCC	2	(Italy) Gabriele Tarquini	All
(Russia) Lada Sport Rosneft	Lada Vesta WTCC	7	(France) Hugo Valente	All
(Russia) Lada Sport Rosneft	Lada Vesta WTCC	10	(Netherlands) Nick Catsburg	All
(Japan) Honda Racing Team JAS	Honda Civic WTCC	5	(Hungary) Norbert Michelisz	All
(Japan) Honda Racing Team JAS	Honda Civic WTCC	34	(Japan) Ryō Michigami	9
(Japan) Castrol Honda World Touring Car Team	Honda Civic WTCC	12	(United Kingdom) Robert Huff	All
(Japan) Castrol Honda World Touring Car Team	Honda Civic WTCC	18	(Portugal) Tiago Monteiro	All
(France) Citroën Racing	Citroën C-Elysée WTCC	37	(Argentina) José María López	All
(France) Citroën Racing	Citroën C-Elysée WTCC	68	(France) Yvan Muller	All
(Sweden) Polestar Cyan Racing	Volvo S60 Polestar TC1	61	(Sweden) Fredrik Ekblom	1–6, 10
(Sweden) Polestar Cyan Racing	Volvo S60 Polestar TC1	62	(Sweden) Thed Björk	All
(Sweden) Polestar Cyan Racing	Volvo S60 Polestar TC1	63	(Sweden) Robert Dahlgren	7–8, 11
(Sweden) Polestar Cyan Racing	Volvo S60 Polestar TC1	81	(Argentina) Néstor Girolami	9
Independent entries
(France) Sébastien Loeb Racing	Citroën C-Elysée WTCC	3	(United Kingdom) Tom Chilton	All
(France) Sébastien Loeb Racing	Citroën C-Elysée WTCC	11	(France) Grégoire Demoustier	All
(France) Sébastien Loeb Racing	Citroën C-Elysée WTCC	25	(Morocco) Mehdi Bennani	All
(Germany) ALL-INKL.COM Münnich Motorsport	Chevrolet RML Cruze TC1	8	(Germany) Sabine Schmitz	5
(Germany) ALL-INKL.COM Münnich Motorsport	Chevrolet RML Cruze TC1	15	(United Kingdom) James Thompson	2, 4, 6–11
(Germany) ALL-INKL.COM Münnich Motorsport	Chevrolet RML Cruze TC1	77	(Germany) René Münnich	1, 3
(Italy) ROAL Motorsport	Chevrolet RML Cruze TC1	9	(Netherlands) Tom Coronel	All
(Spain) Campos Racing	Chevrolet RML Cruze TC1	27	(France) John Filippi	All
(Spain) Campos Racing	Chevrolet RML Cruze TC1	86	(Argentina) Esteban Guerrieri	8
(Hungary) Zengő Motorsport	Honda Civic WTCC	55	(Hungary) Ferenc Ficza	All
(Hungary) Zengő Motorsport	Honda Civic WTCC	99	(Hungary) Dániel Nagy	1, 7–11
ETCC Entries ineligible to score points
Super 2000
(Hungary) Zengő Motorsport	SEAT León Cup Racer	108	(Hungary) Norbert Nagy	5
(Switzerland) Rikli Motorsport	Honda Civic TCR	111	(Switzerland) Kris Richard	5
(Switzerland) Rikli Motorsport	Honda Civic TCR	112	(Switzerland) Peter Rikli	5
(Slovenia) Lema Racing	SEAT León Cup Racer	114	(North Macedonia) Igor Stefanovski	5
(Slovenia) Lema Racing	SEAT León Cup Racer	137	(Portugal) Fábio Mota	5
(Serbia) ASK Lein Racing	SEAT León Cup Racer	117	(Serbia) Mladen Lalušić	5
(Czech Republic) Krenek Motorsport	SEAT León Cup Racer	119	(Switzerland) Christjohannes Schreiber	5
(Czech Republic) Krenek Motorsport	SEAT León Cup Racer	122	(Czech Republic) Petr Fulín	5
(France) Sébastien Loeb Racing	Peugeot 308 Racing Cup	130	(France) Teddy Clairet	5
(France) Sébastien Loeb Racing	Peugeot 308 Racing Cup	138	(France) David Pouget	5
Super 1600
(Germany) RAVENOL Motorsport	Ford Fiesta 1.6 16V	181	(Germany) Niklas Mackschin	5
(Germany) RAVENOL Motorsport	Ford Fiesta 1.6 16V	182	(Ukraine) Ksenia Niks	5
(Germany) RAVENOL Motorsport	Ford Fiesta 1.6 16V	183	(Germany) Daniel Niermann	5
(Germany) RAVENOL Motorsport	Ford Fiesta 1.6 16V	184	(Germany) Ulrike Krafft	5
(Germany) ETH Tuning	Peugeot 207 Sport	186	(Germany) Andreas Rinke	5
(Germany) ETH Tuning	Peugeot 207 Sport	187	(Austria) David Griessner	5
(Ukraine) Master KR Racing	Ford Fiesta 1.6 16V	195	(Ukraine) Sergii Kravets	5
(Ukraine) Master KR Racing	Ford Fiesta 1.6 16V	197	(Ukraine) Pavlo Kopylets	5

== Calendar ==
The provisional 2016 schedule was revealed on 2 December 2015. With the confirmation of the 2016 SMP F4 Championship calendar, it was originally confirmed the season would start at the Sochi Autodrom, with the Russian round of the championship switching from Moscow Raceway. However, on 9 February 2016, the calendar was adjusted, leaving the Russian round at Moscow in June.

Rnd.	Race	Race Name	Circuit	Date
1	1	JVC Kenwood Race of France	(France) Circuit Paul Ricard	3 April
1	2	JVC Kenwood Race of France	(France) Circuit Paul Ricard	3 April
2	3	Race of Slovakia	Automotodróm Slovakia Ring	17 April
2	4	Race of Slovakia	Automotodróm Slovakia Ring	17 April
3	5	Race of Hungary	(Hungary) Hungaroring	24 April
3	6	Race of Hungary	(Hungary) Hungaroring	24 April
4	7	Afriquia Race of Morocco	(Morocco) Circuit International Automobile Moulay El Hassan	8 May
4	8	Afriquia Race of Morocco	(Morocco) Circuit International Automobile Moulay El Hassan	8 May
5	9	Race of Germany	(Germany) Nürburgring Nordschleife	28 May
5	10	Race of Germany	(Germany) Nürburgring Nordschleife	28 May
6	11	Rosneft Race of Russia	(Russia) Moscow Raceway	12 June
6	12	Rosneft Race of Russia	(Russia) Moscow Raceway	12 June
7	13	Race of Portugal	(Portugal) Circuito Internacional de Vila Real	26 June
7	14	Race of Portugal	(Portugal) Circuito Internacional de Vila Real	26 June
8	15	Race of Argentina	(Argentina) Autódromo Termas de Río Hondo	7 August
8	16	Race of Argentina	(Argentina) Autódromo Termas de Río Hondo	7 August
9	17	JVC Kenwood Race of Japan	(Japan) Twin Ring Motegi	4 September
9	18	JVC Kenwood Race of Japan	(Japan) Twin Ring Motegi	4 September
10	19	Race of China	(China) Shanghai International Circuit	25 September
10	20	Race of China	(China) Shanghai International Circuit	25 September
11	21	Race of Qatar	(Qatar) Losail International Circuit	25 November
11	22	Race of Qatar	(Qatar) Losail International Circuit	25 November

=== Calendar changes ===
- The Race of Thailand was cancelled after the organiser Eurosport Events and the Thai ASN failed to come to an agreement. No replacement race will be held, reducing the calendar to 11 race weekends.

== Results and standings ==
=== Compensation weights ===
The most competitive cars keep an 80 kg compensation weight. The other cars get a lower one, calculated according to their results for the three previous rounds. The less the cars get some good results, the less they get a compensation weight, from 0 kg to 80 kg. For the first two rounds, Citroën C-Elysée WTCC had an 80 kg compensation weight.

Car	Paul Ricard	Slovakia Ring	Hungaroring	Marrakech	Nürburgring	Moscow	Vila Real	Termas de Río Hondo	Motegi	Shanghai	Losail
Citroën C-Elysée WTCC	+80 kg	+80 kg	+80 kg	+80 kg	+80 kg	+80 kg	+80 kg	+80 kg	+80 kg	+80 kg	+80 kg
Honda Civic WTCC	0 kg	0 kg	+70 kg	+40 kg	+40 kg	+30 kg	+60 kg	+60 kg	+80 kg	+60 kg	+30 kg
Chevrolet RML Cruze TC1	0 kg	0 kg	0 kg	0 kg	0 kg	0 kg	+10 kg	0 kg	+10 kg	0 kg	0 kg
Lada Vesta WTCC	0 kg	0 kg	+50 kg	+30 kg	+40 kg	+20 kg	+70 kg	+50 kg	+50 kg	0 kg	0 kg
Volvo S60 Polestar TC1	0 kg	0 kg	0 kg	0 kg	0 kg	0 kg	0 kg	0 kg	0 kg	0 kg	0 kg

=== Races ===
Race	Race Name	MAC3 winner	Pole Position	Fastest lap	Winning driver	Winning team	Winning manufacturer	Independent winner	Report
1	Race of France	(France) Citroën		(United Kingdom) Robert Huff	(United Kingdom) Robert Huff	(Japan) Castrol Honda	(Japan) Honda	(Morocco) Mehdi Bennani	Report
2	Race of France	(France) Citroën	(Argentina) José María López	(France) Yvan Muller	(Argentina) José María López	(France) Citroën Racing	(France) Citroën	(Morocco) Mehdi Bennani	Report
3	Race of Slovakia	(France) Citroën (Japan) Honda		(United Kingdom) Robert Huff	(Portugal) Tiago Monteiro	(Japan) Castrol Honda	(Japan) Honda	(Morocco) Mehdi Bennani	Report
4	Race of Slovakia	(France) Citroën (Japan) Honda	(France) Yvan Muller	(Argentina) José María López	(Argentina) José María López	(France) Citroën Racing	(France) Citroën	(Morocco) Mehdi Bennani	Report
5	Race of Hungary	(Japan) Honda		(Argentina) José María López	(Morocco) Mehdi Bennani	(France) Sébastien Loeb Racing	(France) Citroën	(Morocco) Mehdi Bennani	Report
6	Race of Hungary	(Japan) Honda	(Argentina) José María López	(Argentina) José María López	(Argentina) José María López	(France) Citroën Racing	(France) Citroën	(United Kingdom) Tom Chilton	Report
7	Race of Morocco	(France) Citroën		(France) Hugo Valente	(Netherlands) Tom Coronel	(Italy) ROAL Motorsport	(United States) Chevrolet	(Netherlands) Tom Coronel	Report
8	Race of Morocco	(France) Citroën	(United Kingdom) Robert Huff	(Italy) Gabriele Tarquini	(Argentina) José María López (Note: The original winner Robert Huff. However, he was disqualified in the Honda cars of the technical regulation violations.)	(France) Citroën Racing	(France) Citroën	(Morocco) Mehdi Bennani	Report
9	Race of Germany	(Japan) Honda		(United Kingdom) Tom Chilton	(Argentina) José María López	(France) Citroën Racing	(France) Citroën	(United Kingdom) Tom Chilton	Report
10	Race of Germany	(Japan) Honda	(Argentina) José María López	(Morocco) Mehdi Bennani	(Argentina) José María López	(France) Citroën Racing	(France) Citroën	(United Kingdom) Tom Chilton	Report
11	Race of Russia	(Japan) Honda		(Netherlands) Nick Catsburg	(Italy) Gabriele Tarquini	(Russia) Lada Sport Rosneft	(Russia) Lada	(United Kingdom) James Thompson	Report
12	Race of Russia	(Japan) Honda	(Netherlands) Nick Catsburg	(Hungary) Ferenc Ficza	(Netherlands) Nick Catsburg	(Russia) Lada Sport Rosneft	(Russia) Lada	(United Kingdom) James Thompson	Report
13	Race of Portugal	(France) Citroën		(Argentina) José María López	(Netherlands) Tom Coronel	(Italy) ROAL Motorsport	(United States) Chevrolet	(Netherlands) Tom Coronel	Report
14	Race of Portugal	(France) Citroën	(Portugal) Tiago Monteiro	(United Kingdom) Robert Huff	(Portugal) Tiago Monteiro	(Japan) Castrol Honda	(Japan) Honda	(Morocco) Mehdi Bennani	Report
15	Race of Argentina	(Japan) Honda		(Argentina) José María López	(United Kingdom) Tom Chilton	(France) Sébastien Loeb Racing	(France) Citroën	(United Kingdom) Tom Chilton	Report
16	Race of Argentina	(Japan) Honda	(Argentina) José María López	(Argentina) José María López	(Argentina) José María López	(France) Citroën Racing	(France) Citroën	(Netherlands) Tom Coronel	Report
17	Race of Japan	(France) Citroën		(Sweden) Thed Björk	(Hungary) Norbert Michelisz	(Japan) Honda Racing Team JAS	(Japan) Honda	(United Kingdom) Tom Chilton	Report
18	Race of Japan	(France) Citroën	(Argentina) José María López	(Argentina) José María López	(France) Yvan Muller	(France) Citroën Racing	(France) Citroën	(Morocco) Mehdi Bennani	Report
19	Race of China	(Japan) Honda		(Sweden) Thed Björk	(Sweden) Thed Björk	(Sweden) Polestar Cyan Racing	(Sweden) Volvo	(Netherlands) Tom Coronel	Report
20	Race of China	(Japan) Honda	(Argentina) José María López	(Argentina) José María López	(Argentina) José María López	(France) Citroën Racing	(France) Citroën	(Morocco) Mehdi Bennani	Report
21	Race of Qatar	(France) Citroën		(Italy) Gabriele Tarquini	(Italy) Gabriele Tarquini	(Russia) Lada Sport Rosneft	(Russia) Lada	(United Kingdom) Tom Chilton	Report
22	Race of Qatar	(France) Citroën	(Morocco) Mehdi Bennani	(Netherlands) Nick Catsburg	(Morocco) Mehdi Bennani	(France) Sébastien Loeb Racing	(France) Citroën	(Morocco) Mehdi Bennani	Report

=== Championship standings ===
==== Drivers' championship ====
Pos.	Driver	FRA (France)		SVK (Slovakia)		HUN (Hungary)		MAR (Morocco)		GER (Germany)		RUS (Russia)		PRT (Portugal)		ARG (Argentina)		JPN (Japan)		CHN (China)		QAT (Qatar)		Pts.
1	(Argentina) José María López	6	**1**^{1}	5	1^{3}	13	**1**^{1}	2	1^{1}	1	**1**^{1}	5	8	5	5^{5}	5	**1**^{1}	4	**2**^{1}	4	**1**^{1}	9	3^{3}	381
2	(France) Yvan Muller	13	4^{3}	7	**5**^{1}	12	2	3	2^{3}	Ret	DNS^{2}	3	11	9	2^{2}	3	5^{4}	5	1^{2}	3	2^{3}	4	6^{4}	257
3	(Portugal) Tiago Monteiro	4	2^{2}	1	2	11	3^{4}	DSQ	DSQ	**Ret**	DNS	**6**	5	10	**1**^{1}	4	4	3	3^{4}	10	8	Ret	5	214
4	(Hungary) Norbert Michelisz	3	3	6	4^{4}	DNS	10	DSQ	DSQ	3	2^{4}	10	3^{5}	8	3^{3}	6	8^{2}	**1**	8	2	11	5	4^{5}	213
5	(Morocco) Mehdi Bennani	2	8	2	6	**1**	8	6	5	5	5	9	10	4	8	8	7	16	4^{3}	11	3^{4}	16	**1**^{1}	206
6	(United Kingdom) Robert Huff	1	6	3	14^{5}	10	6^{3}	DSQ	**DSQ**	4	4	7	4	6	4^{4}	2	3	2	9	9	13	3	8	199
7	(Netherlands) Nick Catsburg	8	5^{5}	11	3^{2}	3	13	Ret	7^{2}	9	6	2	**1**^{1}	3	7	13	12	7	11	5	4^{2}	8	14	175
8	(United Kingdom) Tom Chilton	11	9	9	7	2	5	5	DSQ	2	3^{5}	14	16	2	10	1	9	8	6^{5}	Ret	9	**2**	Ret	163
9	(Italy) Gabriele Tarquini	Ret	Ret	4	13	5	Ret	4	3	7	9	1	2^{2}	12	13	14	13	10	10	16†	5	1	7	147
10	(Sweden) Thed Björk	7	Ret	DSQ	DSQ	15	4^{5}	9	10^{5}	Ret	8	Ret	15	7	6	11	14	6	7	1	7^{5}	6	2^{2}	117
11	(Netherlands) Tom Coronel	9	11^{4}	15	9	14	7^{2}	1	8^{4}	Ret	DNS^{3}	12	Ret	**1**	16	7	2^{3}	17	14	7	10	12	9	111
12	(France) Hugo Valente	**5**	7	**12**	Ret	6	9	Ret	4	6	10	4	7^{3}	Ret	9	Ret	Ret	Ret	13	6	12	Ret	Ret	78
13	(Sweden) Fredrik Ekblom	NC	10	10	8	4	11	7	11	8	7	13	12							8	6			47
14	(United Kingdom) James Thompson			16	11			**Ret**	6			8	6^{4}	11	11	9	11	13	12	12	14	10	10	24
15	(Argentina) Néstor Girolami																	9	5					12
16	(France) Grégoire Demoustier	10	13	13	12	7	Ret	8	Ret	11	14	16	13	16	12	12	15	17	15	13	17	15	12	11
17	(Argentina) Esteban Guerrieri															Ret	6^{5}							9
18	(France) John Filippi	12	12	14	10	8	12	Ret	9	Ret	12	11	14	15	14	**10**	10	14	16	**Ret**	15	14	13	9
19	(Sweden) Robert Dahlgren													13	Ret	16	16					7	Ret	6
20	(Hungary) Ferenc Ficza	DNS	DNS	Ret	DNS	DSQ	DSQ	DSQ	DSQ	12	13	15	9	14	15	WD	WD	18	18	14	16	13	11	2
21	(Germany) René Münnich	14	Ret			9	14																	2
22	(Germany) Sabine Schmitz									10	11													1
—	(Hungary) Dániel Nagy	WD	WD											17	Ret	15	17	15	19	15	18	11	15	0
—	(Japan) Ryō Michigami																	11	17					0
Pos.	Driver	FRA (France)		SVK (Slovakia)		HUN (Hungary)		MAR (Morocco)		GER (Germany)		RUS (Russia)		PRT (Portugal)		ARG (Argentina)		JPN (Japan)		CHN (China)		QAT (Qatar)		Pts.

Colour	Result
Gold	Winner
Silver	Second place
Bronze	Third place
Green	Points classification
Blue	Non-points classification
Blue	Non-classified finish (NC)
Purple	Retired, not classified (Ret)
Red	Did not qualify (DNQ)
Red	Did not pre-qualify (DNPQ)
Black	Disqualified (DSQ)
White	Did not start (DNS)
White	Withdrew (WD)
White	Race cancelled (C)
Blank	Did not practice (DNP)
Blank	Did not arrive (DNA)
Blank	Excluded (EX)

**Bold** – Pole
Italics – Fastest Lap

† – Drivers did not finish the race, but were classified as they completed over 75% of the race distance.

Championship points were awarded on the results of each race at each event as follows:

Position	**1st**	**2nd**	**3rd**	**4th**	**5th**	**6th**	**7th**	**8th**	**9th**	**10th**
Points	25	18	15	12	10	8	6	4	2	1

Notes

- ^{1} ^{2} ^{3} ^{4} ^{5} refers to the classification of the drivers after the qualifying for the main race (second race), where bonus points are awarded 5–4–3–2–1.

==== Manufacturers' Championship ====
Pos.	Manufacturer	(France) FRA			(Slovakia) SVK			(Hungary) HUN			(Morocco) MAR			(Germany) GER			(Russia) RUS			(Portugal) PRT			(Argentina) ARG			(Japan) JPN			(China) CHN			(Qatar) QAT			Pts.
Pos.	Manufacturer	M	R1	R2	M	R1	R2	M	R1	R2	M	R1	R2	M	R1	R2	M	R1	R2	M	R1	R2	M	R1	R2	M	R1	R2	M	R1	R2	M	R1	R2	Pts.
1	(France) Citroën	1	2	1^{1}	1	2	1^{1}	2	1	1^{1}	1	2	1^{1}	2	1	1^{1}	2	5	8^{4}	1	1	2^{2}	2	1	1^{1}	1	4	1^{1}	Ret	3	1^{1}	1	2	1^{1}	957
1	(France) Citroën	1	6	4^{3}	1	5	5^{3}	2	2	2	1	3	3^{3}	2	5	5^{2}	2	9	10^{5}	1	5	5^{4}	2	3	5^{3}	1	5	2^{2}	Ret	4	2^{3}	1	4	3^{3}	957
2	(Japan) Honda	3	1	2^{2}	1	1	2^{4}	1	10	3^{2}	DSQ	DSQ	DSQ	1	3	2^{3}	1	6	3^{3}	2	6	1^{1}	1	2	3^{2}	2	1	3	1	2	8	DNP	3	4^{4}	675
2	(Japan) Honda	3	3	3^{5}	1	3	4^{5}	1	11	6^{3}	DSQ	DSQ	DSQ	1	4	4	1	7	4	2	8	3^{3}	1	4	4^{4}	2	2	8	1	9	11	DNP	5	5^{5}	675
3	(Russia) Lada	2	5	5^{4}	Ret	4	3^{2}	3	3	9^{5}	2	4	3^{2}	DNP	6	6^{4}	3	1	1^{1}	3	3	7	3	13	12^{5}	3	7	10^{5}	2	5	4^{2}	DNP	1	7	536
3	(Russia) Lada	2	8	7	Ret	11	13	3	5	13	2	Ret	4^{5}	DNP	7	9	3	2	2^{2}	3	12	9	3	14	13	3	10	11	2	6	5^{5}	DNP	8	14	536
4	(Sweden) Volvo	DNP	7	10	DNP	10	8	DNP	4	4^{4}	DNP	7	10^{4}	DNP	8	7^{5}	DNP	13	12	DNP	7	6^{5}	DNP	11	14	DNP	6	5^{4}	DNP	1	6^{4}	DNP	6	2^{2}	321
4	(Sweden) Volvo	DNP	NC	Ret	DNP	DSQ	DSQ	DNP	15	11	DNP	9	11	DNP	Ret	8	DNP	Ret	15	DNP	13	Ret	DNP	16	16	DNP	9	7	DNP	8	7	DNP	7	Ret	321
Pos.	Manufacturer	(France) FRA			(Slovakia) SVK			(Hungary) HUN			(Morocco) MAR			(Germany) GER			(Russia) RUS			(Portugal) PRT			(Argentina) ARG			(Japan) JPN			(China) CHN			(Qatar) QAT			Pts.

Notes

Only the two best placed cars of each manufacturer earned points.

- ^{1} ^{2} ^{3} ^{4} ^{5} refers to the classification of the drivers in the main race qualification, where bonus points are awarded 5–4–3–2–1. Points were only awarded to the fastest two cars from each manufacturer.

In MAC3 points are awarded if 3 cars of the same manufacturer within a 15 seconds gap. MAC3 points were awarded as follows:

Position	**1st**	**2nd**	**3rd**
Points	10	8	6

==== WTCC Trophy ====
WTCC Trophy points are awarded to the first eight drivers classified in each race on the following scale: 10-8-6-5-4-3-2-1. One point is awarded to the highest-placed WTCC Trophy competitor in qualifying and for another for the fastest lap in each race.

Pos.	Driver	FRA (France)		SVK (Slovakia)		HUN (Hungary)		MAR (Morocco)		GER (Germany)		RUS (Russia)		PRT (Portugal)		ARG (Argentina)		JPN (Japan)		CHN (China)		QAT (Qatar)		Pts.
1	(Morocco) Mehdi Bennani	2	8	2	**6**	1	8	6	5	5	5	9	10	4	**8**	8	7	16	**4**	11	**3**	16	**1**	190
2	(United Kingdom) Tom Chilton	11	9	9	7	2	5	5	DSQ	2	3	14	16	2	10	1	8	8	6	Ret	9	2	Ret	155
3	(Netherlands) Tom Coronel	9	**11**	15	9	14	**7**	1	**8**	Ret	**DNS**	12	Ret	1	16	7	**2**	12	14	7	10	12	9	134
4	(United Kingdom) James Thompson			16	11			Ret	6			8	**6**	11	11	9	11	13	12	12	14	10	10	93
5	(France) John Filippi	12	12	14	10	8	12	Ret	9	Ret	12	11	14	15	14	10	10	14	16	Ret	15	14	13	83
6	(France) Grégoire Demoustier	10	13	13	12	7	Ret	8	Ret	11	14	16	13	16	12	12	15	17	15	13	17	15	12	76
7	(Hungary) Ferenc Ficza	DNS	DNS	Ret	DNS	DSQ	DSQ	DSQ	DSQ	12	13	15	9	14	15			18	18	14	16	13	11	45
8	(Hungary) Dániel Nagy	WD	WD											17	Ret	15	19	15	19	15	18	11	15	21
9	(Germany) Sabine Schmitz									10	11													12
10	(Germany) René Münnich	14	Ret			9	14																	11
11	(Argentina) Esteban Guerrieri															Ret	6							9
Pos.	Driver	FRA (France)		SVK (Slovakia)		HUN (Hungary)		MAR (Morocco)		GER (Germany)		RUS (Russia)		PRT (Portugal)		ARG (Argentina)		JPN (Japan)		CHN (China)		QAT (Qatar)		Pts.

==== WTCC Teams' Trophy ====
All the teams taking part in the championship were eligible to score points towards the Teams' Trophy, with the exception of manufacturer teams, with the first two cars from each team scoring points in each race on the following scale: 10-8-6-5-4-3-2-1.

Pos	Team	FRA (France)		SVK (Slovakia)		HUN (Hungary)		MAR (Morocco)		GER (Germany)		RUS (Russia)		PRT (Portugal)		ARG (Argentina)		JPN (Japan)		CHN (China)		QAT (Qatar)		Pts
1	(France) Sébastien Loeb Racing	2	8	2	6	1	5	5	5	2	3	9	10	2	8	1	7	8	4	11	3	2	1	334
1	(France) Sébastien Loeb Racing	10	9	9	7	2	8	6	Ret	5	5	14	13	4	10	8	8	16	6	13	9	15	12	334
2	(Italy) ROAL Motorsport	9	11	15	9	14	7	1	8	Ret	DNS	12	Ret	1	16	7	2	12	14	7	10	12	9	131
3	(Germany) ALL-INKL.COM Münnich Motorsport	14	Ret	16	11	9	14	Ret	6	10	11	8	6	11	11	9	11	13	12	12	14	10	10	117
4	(Spain) Campos Racing	12	12	14	10	8	12	Ret	9	Ret	12	11	14	15	14	10	6	14	16	Ret	15	14	13	95
4	(Spain) Campos Racing															Ret	10							95
5	(Hungary) Zengő Motorsport	DNS	DNS	Ret	DNS	DSQ	DSQ	DSQ	DSQ	12	13	15	9	14	15	15	19	15	18	14	16	11	11	75
5	(Hungary) Zengő Motorsport	WD	WD											17	Ret			18	19	15	18	13	15	75
Pos	Team	FRA (France)		SVK (Slovakia)		HUN (Hungary)		MAR (Morocco)		GER (Germany)		RUS (Russia)		PRT (Portugal)		ARG (Argentina)		JPN (Japan)		CHN (China)		QAT (Qatar)		Pts

== Regulation changes ==
The sporting regulations were approved by the FIA, at the December 2015 meeting of the World Motor Sport Council.

=== Sporting regulations ===
- The reverse grid race of the weekend was switched from race two to race one, with the length of race two being increased by one lap.
- A new qualifying time trial format was introduced for manufacturers, titled Manufacturers Against the Clock (MAC3), to be held at the end of the regular three-part qualifying session.
- Compensation weight for the most successful car was increased to 80 kg.

== See also ==
- 2016 European Touring Car Cup
