= FIA WTCR Race of Morocco =

Round of the World Touring Car Championship

- Marrakech Street Circuit (2009–2010, 2012–2019)

Race information
- Number of times held: 9
- First held: 2009
- Last held: 2019
- Most wins (drivers): (Italy) Gabriele Tarquini (3)
- Most wins (constructors): (United States) Chevrolet (7)

Last race (2019)
- Race 1 Winner: (Argentina) Esteban Guerrieri; (ALL-INKL.COM Münnich Motorsport)
- Race 2 Winner: (Italy) Gabriele Tarquini; (BRC Hyundai N Squadra Corse)
- Race 3 Winner: (Sweden) Thed Björk; (Cyan Racing Lynk & Co)

The FIA WTCR Race of Morocco (سباق المغرب) is a round of the World Touring Car Championship, held on the temporary Marrakech Street Circuit in the city of Marrakesh in Morocco.

The race was first run in May 2009 on a purpose-built track. It was the first international car race in Morocco since the 1958 Moroccan Grand Prix at the Ain-Diab Circuit in Casablanca. It is also the only WTCC race to ever take place in Africa. The race was scheduled to be the season opener for the 2014 season for the first time, taking the place of the FIA WTCC Race of Italy.

Moroccan driver Mehdi Bennani has taken the independents' victory twice when he finished ninth in both race one in 2009 and race two in 2012.

== Winners ==
Original layout of Marrakech Street Circuit, which held races in 2009–2010 and 2012–2015

Year	Race	Driver	Manufacturer	Location	Report
2019	Race 1	(Argentina) Esteban Guerrieri	(Japan) Honda	Marrakesh	Report
2019	Race 2	(Italy) Gabriele Tarquini	(South Korea) Hyundai	Marrakesh	Report
2019	Race 3	(Sweden) Thed Björk	(Sweden) Lynk & Co	Marrakesh	Report
2018	Race 1	(Italy) Gabriele Tarquini	(South Korea) Hyundai	Marrakesh	Report
2018	Race 2	(France) Jean Karl Vernay	(Germany) Audi	Marrakesh	Report
2018	Race 3	(Italy) Gabriele Tarquini	(South Korea) Hyundai	Marrakesh	Report
2017	Opening Race	(Argentina) Esteban Guerrieri	(United States) Chevrolet	Marrakesh	Report
2017	Main Race	(Portugal) Tiago Monteiro	(Japan) Honda	Marrakesh	Report
2016	Opening Race	(Netherlands) Tom Coronel	(United States) Chevrolet	Marrakesh	Report
2016	Main Race	(Argentina) José María López	(France) Citroën	Marrakesh	Report
2015	Race 1	(Argentina) José María López	(France) Citroën	Marrakesh	Report
2015	Race 2	(France) Yvan Muller	(France) Citroën	Marrakesh	Report
2014	Race 1	(Argentina) José María López	(France) Citroën	Marrakesh	Report
2014	Race 2	(France) Sébastien Loeb	(France) Citroën	Marrakesh	Report
2013	Race 1	(Denmark) Michel Nykjær	(United States) Chevrolet	Marrakesh	Report
2013	Race 2	(Spain) Pepe Oriola	(Spain) SEAT	Marrakesh	Report
2012	Race 1	(Switzerland) Alain Menu	(United States) Chevrolet	Marrakesh	Report
2012	Race 2	(France) Yvan Muller	(United States) Chevrolet	Marrakesh	Report
2010	Race 1	(Italy) Gabriele Tarquini	(Spain) SEAT	Marrakesh	Report
2010	Race 2	(United Kingdom) Andy Priaulx	(Germany) BMW	Marrakesh	Report
2009	Race 1	(United Kingdom) Robert Huff	(United States) Chevrolet	Marrakesh	Report
2009	Race 2	(Italy) Nicola Larini	(United States) Chevrolet	Marrakesh	Report
