= Anett György =

Hungarian racing driver (born 1996)

- Nationality: Hungarian
- Born: 7 October 1996 (age 30) Esztergom, Hungary

TCR International Series career
- Debut season: 2017
- Current team: Zengő Motorsport
- Car number: 77
- Starts: 2

Previous series
- 2017 2015 2013-14: European Touring Car Cup; Hungarian Lotus Cup; Lotus Ladies Cup

Championship titles
- 2015: Hungarian Lotus Cup – Ladies Cup

Anett György (born 7 October 1996) is a Hungarian racing driver currently competing in the TCR International Series and European Touring Car Cup. She previously competed in the Hungarian Lotus Cup amongst others.

== Racing career ==
György began her career in 2013 in the Lotus Ladies Cup, taking several podiums and one pole position during her two seasons in the championship, she ended the seasons fifth and fourth in the championship standings those two years respectively. In 2015 she switched to the Hungarian Lotus Cup series, she finished the season tenth in the standings and she won the Ladies Cup class that year. She switched to the European Touring Car Cup for 2017, entering the series with Zengő Motorsport. Joining their three car lineup for the season, driving a SEAT León TCR alongside Norbert Nagy and Zsolt Szabó.

In June 2017 it was announced that she would race in the TCR International Series, driving a SEAT León TCR for her ETCC team Zengő Motorsport.

== Racing record ==
=== Career summary ===
Season	Series	Team	Races	Wins	Poles	F/Laps	Podiums	Points	Position
2013	FIA Lotus Ladies Cup		12	0	0	0	1	117	5th
2014	FIA Lotus Ladies Cup	Oxxo Energy Lotus Ladies Team	6	0	1	0	3	49	4th
2017	European Touring Car Cup	Zengő Motorsport	10	0	0	0	0	6	14th
2017	TCR International Series	Zengő Motorsport	2	0	0	0	0	0	NC

=== Complete TCR International Series results ===
(key) (Races in bold indicate pole position) (Races in italics indicate fastest lap)

Year	Team	Car	1	2	3	4	5	6	7	8	9	10	11	12	13	14	15	16	17	18	19	20	DC	Points
2017	Zengő Motorsport	SEAT León TCR	GEO; 1	GEO; 2	BHR; 1	BHR; 2	BEL; 1	BEL; 2	ITA; 1	ITA; 2	AUT; 1	AUT; 2	HUN; 1; 18	HUN; 2; 17	GER; 1	GER; 2	THA; 1	THA; 2	CHN; 1	CHN; 2	ABU; 1	ABU; 2	NC	0

^{†} Driver did not finish the race, but was classified as he completed over 90% of the race distance.
