= FIA WTCC Race of Argentina =

- Autódromo Termas de Río Hondo (2013–2017)

Race information
- Number of times held: 5
- First held: 2013
- Last held: 2017
- Most wins (drivers): (Argentina) J.M. López (5)
- Most wins (constructors): (France) Citroën (6)

Last race (2017)
- Race 1 Winner: (France) Yann Ehrlacher; (RC Motorsport)
- Race 2 Winner: (Hungary) Norbert Michelisz; (Honda Racing Team JAS)

The FIA WTCC Race of Argentina is a round of the World Touring Car Championship, which was held for the first time in the 2013 World Touring Car Championship season at the Autódromo Termas de Río Hondo in Termas de Río Hondo, Argentina.

An Argentinean race was originally scheduled to take place in 2011 at a circuit in Buenos Aires. The planned event was later cancelled after problems homologating the track for international use.

Argentina was added to the provisional 2012 schedule although no circuit was mentioned which would host the event. In January 2012 the event from dropped from the calendar owing to delays agreeing details with the local government, it was later replaced by the FIA WTCC Race of Slovakia.

The calendar for the 2013 season was amended in March 2013 with the FIA WTCC Race of Brazil replaced by two TBA rounds, one of which was a placeholder date for an Argentinean round. One of the events would run in 2013 with the hopes that both would be on the calendar in 2014. In June 2013 it was confirmed that the first Race of Argentina would be held on 4 August at the Autódromo Termas de Río Hondo.

The Argentine Turismo Nacional has raced as support event since 2013.

== Winners ==
José María López has won five of the ten races held in his home country as of 2017.

Year	Race	Driver	Manufacturer	Location	Report
2017	Opening Race	(France) Yann Ehrlacher	(Russia) Lada	Termas de Río Hondo	Report
2017	Main Race	(Hungary) Norbert Michelisz	(Japan) Honda	Termas de Río Hondo	Report
2016	Opening Race	(United Kingdom) Tom Chilton	(France) Citroën	Termas de Río Hondo	Report
2016	Main Race	(Argentina) José María López	(France) Citroën	Termas de Río Hondo	Report
2015	Race 1	(Argentina) José María López	(France) Citroën	Termas de Río Hondo	Report
2015	Race 2	(France) Sébastien Loeb	(France) Citroën	Termas de Río Hondo	Report
2014	Race 1	(Argentina) José María López	(France) Citroën	Termas de Río Hondo	Report
2014	Race 2	(Argentina) José María López	(France) Citroën	Termas de Río Hondo	Report
2013	Race 1	(France) Yvan Muller	(United States) Chevrolet	Termas de Río Hondo	Report
2013	Race 2	(Argentina) José María López	(Germany) BMW	Termas de Río Hondo	Report
