= FIA WTCR Race of Japan =

Reoccurring race for the World Touring Car Championship, located in Japan

FIA WTCC Race of Japan
- Suzuka Circuit (East Circuit) (2011–2013, 2019)
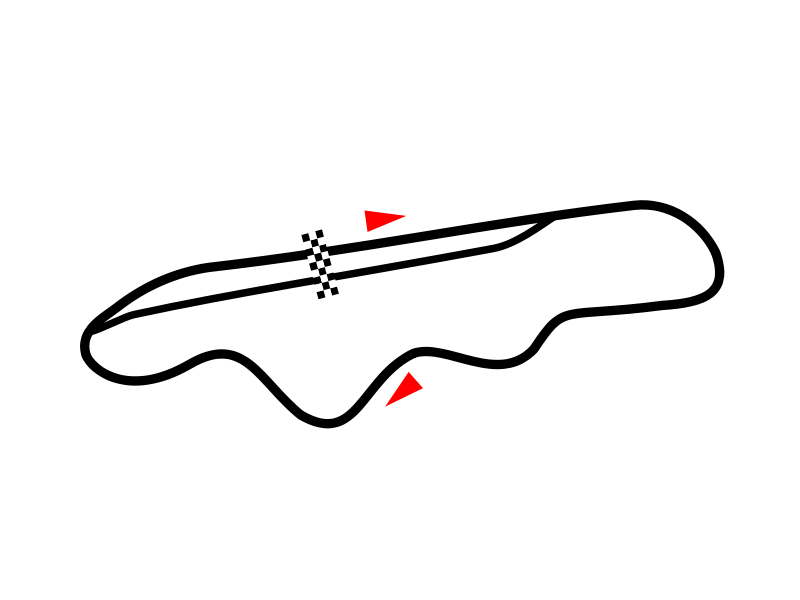

Race information
- Number of times held: 12
- First held: 2008
- Last held: 2019
- Most wins (drivers): (Hungary) Norbert Michelisz (4)
- Most wins (constructors): (Germany) BMW (6) (Japan) Honda (6)

Last race (2016)
- Race 1 Winner: (Hungary) Norbert Michelisz; (Honda Racing Team JAS)
- Race 2 Winner: (France) Yvan Muller; (Citroën Total WTCC)

The FIA WTCC Race of Japan is a round of the World Touring Car Championship, which is held at Suzuka Circuit in Japan. It used to be held at the Okayama International Circuit and at Twin Ring Motegi. The race was first run in 2008, with Rickard Rydell and Tom Coronel winning.

== Winners ==
Suzuka Circuit GP layout, which held races in 2014 and 2018

Twin Ring Motegi, which held races in 2015–2017

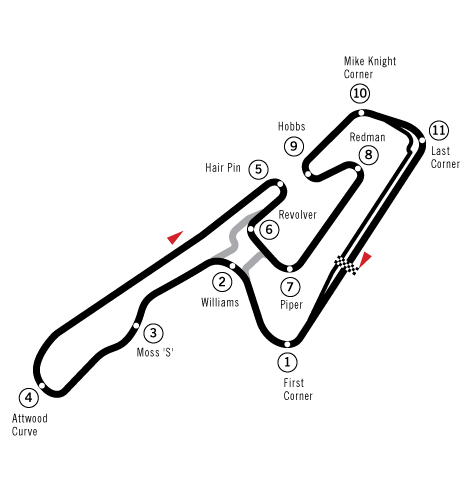
Okayama Circuit, which held races in 2008–2010

| Year | Race | Driver | Manufacturer | Location | Report |
|---|---|---|---|---|---|
| 2019 | Race 1 | (Argentina) Esteban Guerrieri | (Japan) Honda | Suzuka East | Report |
| 2019 | Race 2 | (Hungary) Norbert Michelisz | (South Korea) Hyundai | Suzuka East | Report |
| 2019 | Race 3 | (Sweden) Johan Kristoffersson | (Germany) Volkswagen | Suzuka East | Report |
| 2018 | Race 1 | (Italy) Kevin Ceccon | (Italy) Alfa Romeo | Suzuka GP | Report |
| 2018 | Race 2 | (United Kingdom) Robert Huff | (Germany) Volkswagen | Suzuka GP | Report |
| 2018 | Race 3 | (Italy) Gabriele Tarquini | (South Korea) Hyundai | Suzuka GP | Report |
| 2017 | Opening Race | (United Kingdom) Tom Chilton | (France) Citroën | Twin Ring Motegi | Report |
| 2017 | Main Race | (Hungary) Norbert Michelisz | (Japan) Honda | Twin Ring Motegi | Report |
| 2016 | Opening Race | (Hungary) Norbert Michelisz | (Japan) Honda | Twin Ring Motegi | Report |
| 2016 | Main Race | (France) Yvan Muller | (France) Citroën | Twin Ring Motegi | Report |
| 2015 | Race 1 | (Argentina) José María López | (France) Citroën | Twin Ring Motegi | Report |
| 2015 | Race 2 | (Portugal) Tiago Monteiro | (Japan) Honda | Twin Ring Motegi | Report |
| 2014 | Race 1 | (Argentina) José María López | (France) Citroën | Suzuka GP | Report |
| 2014 | Race 2 | (Italy) Gabriele Tarquini | (Japan) Honda | Suzuka GP | Report |
| 2013 | Race 1 | (Hungary) Norbert Michelisz | (Japan) Honda | Suzuka East | Report |
| 2013 | Race 2 | (Netherlands) Tom Coronel | (Germany) BMW | Suzuka East | Report |
| 2012 | Race 1 | (Switzerland) Alain Menu | (United States) Chevrolet | Suzuka East | Report |
| 2012 | Race 2 | (Italy) Stefano D'Aste | (Germany) BMW | Suzuka East | Report |
| 2011 | Race 1 | (Switzerland) Alain Menu | (United States) Chevrolet | Suzuka East | Report |
| 2011 | Race 2 | (Netherlands) Tom Coronel | (Germany) BMW | Suzuka East | Report |
| 2010 | Race 1 | (United Kingdom) Robert Huff | (United States) Chevrolet | Okayama | Report |
| 2010 | Race 2 | (United Kingdom) Colin Turkington | (Germany) BMW | Okayama | Report |
| 2009 | Race 1 | (United Kingdom) Andy Priaulx | (Germany) BMW | Okayama | Report |
| 2009 | Race 2 | (Brazil) Augusto Farfus | (Germany) BMW | Okayama | Report |
| 2008 | Race 1 | (Sweden) Rickard Rydell | (Spain) SEAT | Okayama | Report |
| 2008 | Race 2 | (Netherlands) Tom Coronel | (Spain) SEAT | Okayama | Report |

== Gallery ==
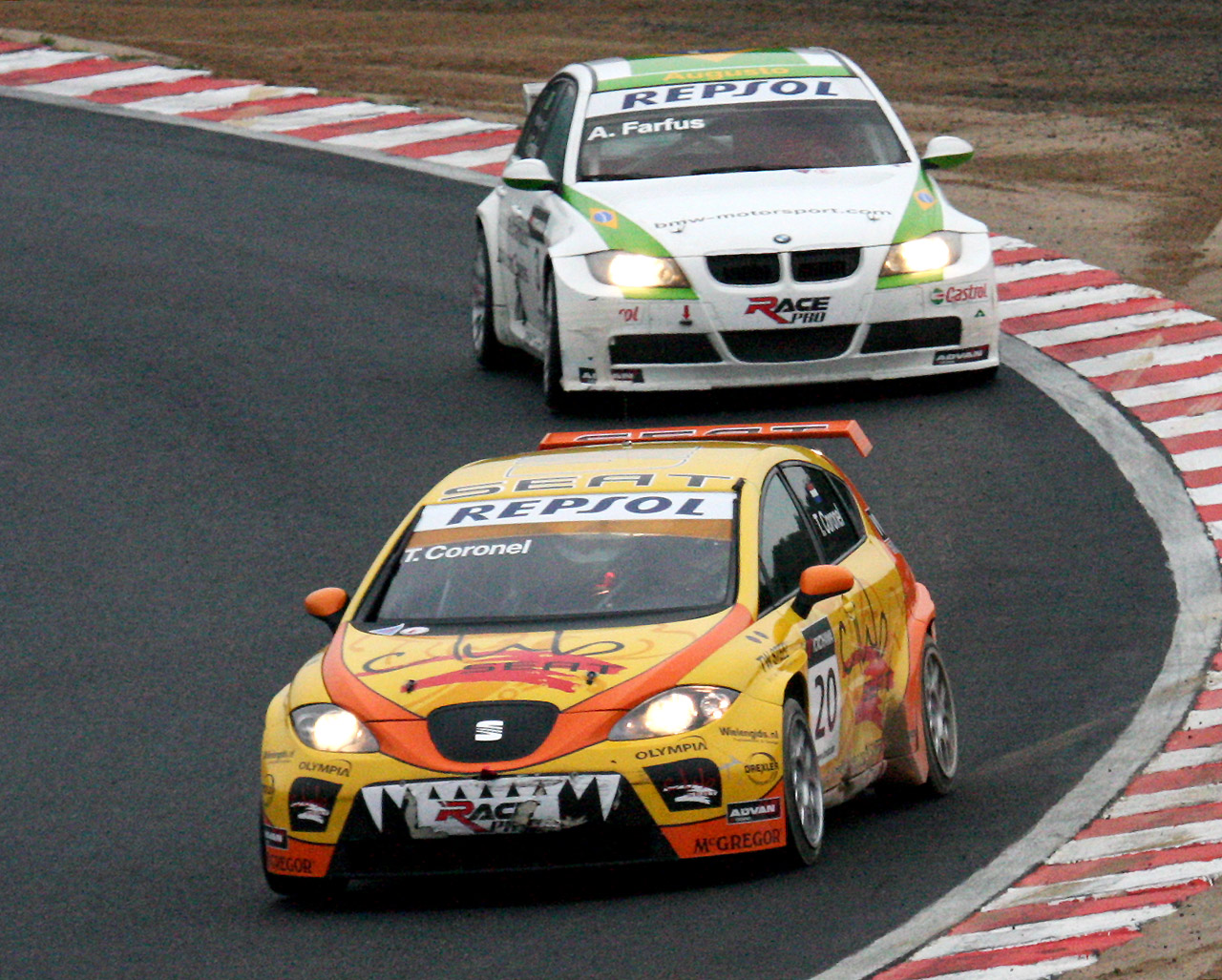
Tom Coronel leading Augusto Farfus on his way to winning Race 2 in 2008
