= 2015 Guia Race of Macau =

2015 TCR International Series Macau round
Round details
- Round 11 of 11 rounds in the 2015 TCR International Series
- Layout of the Guia Circuit
- Location: Guia Circuit, Macau, China
- Course: Permanent racing facility 6.200 km (3.800 mi)

TCR International Series

Race 1
- Date: 22 November 2015
- Laps: 10

Pole position
Driver	(United Kingdom) Robert Huff	WestCoast Racing
- Time: 2:31.522

Podium
First	(United Kingdom) Robert Huff	WestCoast Racing
Second	(Spain) Jordi Gené	Team Craft-Bamboo Lukoil
Third	(Switzerland) Stefano Comini	Target Competition

Fastest lap
Driver	(United Kingdom) Robert Huff	WestCoast Racing
- Time: 2:34.136 (on lap 7)

Race 2
- Date: 22 November 2015
- Laps: 10

Podium
First	(Switzerland) Stefano Comini	Target Competition
Second	(Italy) Andrea Belicchi	Target Competition
Third	(Russia) Mikhail Grachev	Liqui Moly Team Engstler

Fastest lap
Driver	(Spain) Pepe Oriola	Team Craft-Bamboo Lukoil
- Time: 2:34.587 (on lap 7)

The 2015 Guia Race of Macau was the final round of the 2015 TCR International Series season as well as the fourth and last race of the 2015 TCR Asia Series season. It took place on 22 November at the Guia Circuit.

Robert Huff won the first race, starting from pole position, driving a Honda Civic Type R TCR (FK2), and Stefano Comini gained the second one, driving a SEAT León Cup Racer.

The Swiss driver won the title, finishing also third in race 1.

== Success Ballast ==
Due to the results obtained in the previous round, Pepe Oriola and Munkong Sathienthirakul received +30 kg, Stefano Comini and Tin Sritrai +20 kg and Jordi Gené and Kevin Pu +10 kg. Nevertheless, Sathienthirakul, Sritrai and Pu did not take part at this event, so they didn't take the ballast, whereas Frank Yu took the +20 kg from the Singapore round.

== Classification ==
=== Qualifying ===
Pos.	No.	Driver	Car	Team	Q1	Q2	Grid	Points
1	12	(United Kingdom) Robert Huff	Honda Civic Type R TCR (FK2)	(Sweden) WestCoast Racing	2:34.977	2:31.522	1	5
2	24	(United States) Kevin Gleason	Honda Civic Type R TCR (FK2)	(Sweden) WestCoast Racing	2:34.536	2:33.153	2	4
3	25	(Switzerland) Stefano Comini	SEAT León Cup Racer	(Italy) Target Competition	2:35.535	2:33.498	3	3
4	88	(Spain) Jordi Gené	SEAT León Cup Racer	(United Kingdom) Team Craft-Bamboo Lukoil	2:35.873	2:33.528	4	2
5	74	(Spain) Pepe Oriola	SEAT León Cup Racer	(United Kingdom) Team Craft-Bamboo Lukoil	2:35.478	2:33.619	5	1
6	10	(Italy) Gianni Morbidelli	Honda Civic Type R TCR (FK2)	(Sweden) WestCoast Racing	2:35.579	2:34.665	6	
7	77	(Russia) Sergey Afanasyev	SEAT León Cup Racer	(United Kingdom) Team Craft-Bamboo Lukoil	2:35.743	2:35.207	7	
8	21	(Spain) Jordi Oriola	SEAT León Cup Racer	(Italy) Target Competition	2:35.415	2:35.207	8	
9	33	(Italy) Andrea Belicchi	SEAT León Cup Racer	(Italy) Target Competition	2:36.582	2:35.625	9	
10	87	(Macau) Rodolfo Ávila	SEAT León Cup Racer	(Macau) Asia Racing Team	2:37.176	2:36.702	10	
11	7	(Italy) Lorenzo Veglia	Volkswagen Golf TCR	(Germany) Liqui Moly Team Engstler	2:37.617	2:36.726	11	
12	50	(Portugal) Francisco Mora	SEAT León Cup Racer	(Italy) Target Competition	2:37.370	2:38.597	12	
13	29	(Macau) Henry Ho	Honda Civic Type R TCR (FK2)	PAS Macau Racing Team	2:39.456		13	
14	8	(Russia) Mikhail Grachev	Volkswagen Golf TCR	(Germany) Liqui Moly Team Engstler	2:40.103		14	
15	28	(Hong Kong) Sunny Wong	Honda Civic Type R TCR (FK2)	(Sweden) WestCoast Racing	2:40.745		15	
16	14	(United Kingdom) Josh Files	Opel Astra OPC	(Spain) Campos Racing	2:43.105		16	
17	99	(Hong Kong) Frank Yu	SEAT León Cup Racer	(Hong Kong) Craft-Bamboo Racing	2:43.545		18^{1}	
18	69	(United States) Robb Holland	SEAT León Cup Racer	(Hong Kong) Roadstar Racing	2:44.662		17	
19	49	(France) Guillaume Cunnington	SEAT León Cup Racer	(Germany) Liqui Moly Team Engstler	2:45.863		22^{2}	
20	68	(Hong Kong) Michael Choi	Honda Civic Type R TCR (FK2)	(Hong Kong) Prince Racing	2:46.855		21^{2}	
21	38	(Hong Kong) Kenneth Lau	Honda Civic Type R TCR (FK2)	(Hong Kong) Prince Racing	2:46.972		20^{2}	
22	98	(Hong Kong) Keith Chan	SEAT León Cup Racer	(Italy) Target Competition	2:50.381		23^{2}	
23	56	(Hong Kong) Samson Chan	SEAT León Cup Racer	(Hong Kong) Roadstar Racing	2:53.443		24^{2}	
24	63	(Hong Kong) Sam Lok	SEAT León Cup Racer	(Macau) Asia Racing Team	2:56.945		DNQ^{3}	
25	97	(Taiwan) Johnson Huang	SEAT León Cup Racer	(Hong Kong) Roadstar Racing	2:57.640		DNQ^{3}	
26	65	(Malaysia) Douglas Khoo	SEAT León Cup Racer	(Malaysia) Niza Racing	3:05.583		DNQ^{3}	
27	73	(United Kingdom) James Nash	Ford Focus ST	(Italy) Proteam Racing	no time		19^{2}	
28	76	(United Kingdom) Dan Wells	Opel Astra OPC	(Spain) Campos Racing	withdrew			
29	35	(France) Rafaël Galiana	SEAT León Cup Racer	(Italy) Target Competition	withdrew			
30	52	(Switzerland) Alain Menu	Subaru Impreza STi TCR	(Italy) Top Run Motorsport	withdrew			

Notes:

- ^1 – Frank Yu was given a three-position grid penalty for ignoring yellow flags during free practice.
- ^2 – James Nash, Kenneth Lau, Michael Choi, Guillaume Cunnington, Keith Chan and Samson Chan were moved to the back of the grid for having not set a time within the 107% limit. The grid order was decided by the free practice combined classification.
- ^3 – Sam Lok, Johnson Huang and Douglas Khoo failed to set a lap time within 107% of the fastest time during the weekend. As a result, these drivers failed to qualify for the race.

=== Race 1 ===
Pos.	No.	Driver	Car	Team	Laps	Time/Retired	Grid	Points
1	12	(United Kingdom) Robert Huff	Honda Civic Type R TCR (FK2)	(Sweden) WestCoast Racing	10	32:52.232	1	25
2	88	(Spain) Jordi Gené	SEAT León Cup Racer	(United Kingdom) Team Craft-Bamboo Lukoil	10	+7.832	4	18
3	25	(Switzerland) Stefano Comini	SEAT León Cup Racer	(Italy) Target Competition	10	+9.050	3	15
4	74	(Spain) Pepe Oriola	SEAT León Cup Racer	(United Kingdom) Team Craft-Bamboo Lukoil	10	+10.459	5	12
5	21	(Spain) Jordi Oriola	SEAT León Cup Racer	(Italy) Target Competition	10	+13.361	8	10
6	10	(Italy) Gianni Morbidelli	Honda Civic Type R TCR (FK2)	(Sweden) WestCoast Racing	10	+16.268	6	8
7	24	(United States) Kevin Gleason	Honda Civic Type R TCR (FK2)	(Sweden) WestCoast Racing	10	+17.008	2	6
8	33	(Italy) Andrea Belicchi	SEAT León Cup Racer	(Italy) Target Competition	10	+18.229	9	4
9	7	(Italy) Lorenzo Veglia	Volkswagen Golf TCR	(Germany) Liqui Moly Team Engstler	10	+26.627	11	2
10	77	(Russia) Sergey Afanasyev	SEAT León Cup Racer	(United Kingdom) Team Craft-Bamboo Lukoil	10	+34.592	7	1
11	8	(Russia) Mikhail Grachev	Volkswagen Golf TCR	(Germany) Liqui Moly Team Engstler	10	+36.767	14	
12	87	(Macau) Rodolfo Ávila	SEAT León Cup Racer	(Macau) Asia Racing Team	10	+48.016	10	
13	14	(United Kingdom) Josh Files	Opel Astra OPC	(Spain) Campos Racing	10	+53.645	16	
14	27	(United States) Robb Holland	SEAT León Cup Racer	(Hong Kong) Roadstar Racing	10	+1:01.420	17	
15	28	(Hong Kong) Sunny Wong	Honda Civic Type R TCR (FK2)	(Sweden) WestCoast Racing	10	+1:24.708	15	
16	68	(Hong Kong) Michael Choi	Honda Civic Type R TCR (FK2)	(Hong Kong) Prince Racing	10	+1:39.400	21	
17	49	(France) Guillaume Cunnington	SEAT León Cup Racer	(Germany) Liqui Moly Team Engstler	10	+2:09.842	22	
18	98	(Hong Kong) Keith Chan	SEAT León Cup Racer	(Italy) Target Competition	10	+2:17.575	23	
19	56	(Hong Kong) Samson Chan	SEAT León Cup Racer	(Hong Kong) Roadstar Racing	10	+2:28.983	24	
Ret	73	(United Kingdom) James Nash	Ford Focus ST	(Italy) Proteam Racing	5	Overheating	19	
NC	29	(Macau) Henry Ho	SEAT León Cup Racer	PAS Macau Racing Team	3	+7 laps	13	
Ret	50	(Portugal) Francisco Mora	SEAT León Cup Racer	(Italy) Target Competition	0	Accident	12	
Ret	99	(Hong Kong) Frank Yu	SEAT León Cup Racer	(Hong Kong) Craft-Bamboo Racing	0	Collision	18	
Ret	38	(Hong Kong) Kenneth Lau	Honda Civic Type R TCR (FK2)	(Hong Kong) Prince Racing	0	Collision	20	
DNQ	63	(Hong Kong) Sam Lok	SEAT León Cup Racer	(Macau) Asia Racing Team		Did not qualify		
DNQ	97	(Taiwan) Johnson Huang	SEAT León Cup Racer	(Hong Kong) Roadstar Racing		Did not qualify		
DNQ	65	(Malaysia) Douglas Khoo	SEAT León Cup Racer	(Malaysia) Niza Racing		Did not qualify		
WD	76	(United Kingdom) Dan Wells	Opel Astra OPC	(Spain) Campos Racing		Water pump		
WD	35	(France) Rafaël Galiana	SEAT León Cup Racer	(Italy) Target Competition		Accident		
WD	52	(Switzerland) Alain Menu	Subaru Impreza STi TCR	(Italy) Top Run Motorsport		Engine		

=== Race 2 ===
Pos.	No.	Driver	Car	Team	Laps	Time/Retired	Grid	Points
1	25	(Switzerland) Stefano Comini	SEAT León Cup Racer	(Italy) Target Competition	10	36:13.192	3	25
2	33	(Italy) Andrea Belicchi	SEAT León Cup Racer	(Italy) Target Competition	10	+1.733	8	18
3	8	(Russia) Mikhail Grachev	Volkswagen Golf TCR	(Germany) Liqui Moly Team Engstler	10	+26.549	11	15
4	10	(Italy) Gianni Morbidelli	Honda Civic Type R TCR (FK2)	(Sweden) WestCoast Racing	10	+32.677	6	12
5	87	(Macau) Rodolfo Ávila	SEAT León Cup Racer	(Macau) Asia Racing Team	10	+55.890	12	10
6	27	(United States) Robb Holland	SEAT León Cup Racer	(Hong Kong) Roadstar Racing	10	+56.665	14	8
7	98	(Hong Kong) Keith Chan	SEAT León Cup Racer	(Italy) Target Competition	10	+2:17.210	18	6
8	21	(Spain) Jordi Oriola	SEAT León Cup Racer	(Italy) Target Competition	8	Air intake^{4}	5	4
9	74	(Spain) Pepe Oriola	SEAT León Cup Racer	(United Kingdom) Team Craft-Bamboo Lukoil	7	Radiator	4	2
Ret	77	(Russia) Sergey Afanasyev	SEAT León Cup Racer	(United Kingdom) Team Craft-Bamboo Lukoil	1	Collision	10	
Ret	12	(United Kingdom) Robert Huff	Honda Civic Type R TCR (FK2)	(Sweden) WestCoast Racing	0	Collision	1	
Ret	88	(Spain) Jordi Gené	SEAT León Cup Racer	(United Kingdom) Team Craft-Bamboo Lukoil	0	Collision	2	
Ret	24	(United States) Kevin Gleason	Honda Civic Type R TCR (FK2)	(Sweden) WestCoast Racing	0	Collision	7	
Ret	7	(Italy) Lorenzo Veglia	Volkswagen Golf TCR	(Germany) Liqui Moly Team Engstler	0	Collision	9	
Ret	14	(United Kingdom) Josh Files	Opel Astra OPC	(Spain) Campos Racing	0	Collision	13	
Ret	28	(Hong Kong) Sunny Wong	Honda Civic Type R TCR (FK2)	(Sweden) WestCoast Racing	0	Collision	15	
Ret	68	(Hong Kong) Michael Choi	Honda Civic Type R TCR (FK2)	(Hong Kong) Prince Racing	0	Collision	16	
Ret	49	(France) Guillaume Cunnington	SEAT León Cup Racer	(Germany) Liqui Moly Team Engstler	0	Collision	17	
Ret	56	(Hong Kong) Samson Chan	SEAT León Cup Racer	(Hong Kong) Roadstar Racing	0	Collision	19	
Ret	29	(Macau) Henry Ho	Honda Civic Type R TCR (FK2)	PAS Macau Racing Team	0	Collision	21	
DNS	73	(United Kingdom) James Nash	Ford Focus ST	(Italy) Proteam Racing		Overheating	20	
DNS	50	(Portugal) Francisco Mora	SEAT León Cup Racer	(Italy) Target Competition		Accident	22	
DNS	99	(Hong Kong) Frank Yu	SEAT León Cup Racer	(Hong Kong) Craft-Bamboo Racing		Collision	23	
DNS	38	(Hong Kong) Kenneth Lau	Honda Civic Type R TCR (FK2)	(Hong Kong) Prince Racing		Collision	24	
DNQ	63	(Hong Kong) Sam Lok	SEAT León Cup Racer	(Macau) Asia Racing Team		Did not qualify		
DNQ	97	(Taiwan) Johnson Huang	SEAT León Cup Racer	(Hong Kong) Roadstar Racing		Did not qualify		
DNQ	65	(Malaysia) Douglas Khoo	SEAT León Cup Racer	(Malaysia) Niza Racing		Did not qualify		
WD	76	(United Kingdom) Dan Wells	Opel Astra OPC	(Spain) Campos Racing		Water pump		
WD	35	(France) Rafaël Galiana	SEAT León Cup Racer	(Italy) Target Competition		Accident		
WD	52	(Switzerland) Alain Menu	Subaru Impreza STi TCR	(Italy) Top Run Motorsport		Engine		

Notes:

- ^4 – Jordi Oriola was given a 20-second penalty for having passed the pit lane exit line.

== Standings after the event ==
Drivers' Championship standings

Pos	Driver	Points
1	(Switzerland) Stefano Comini	342
2	(Spain) Pepe Oriola	312
3	(Spain) Jordi Gené	285
4	(Italy) Gianni Morbidelli	243
5	(United States) Kevin Gleason	226

Teams' Championship standings

	Pos	Driver	Points
1	1	(Italy) Target Competition	669
1	2	(United Kingdom) Team Craft-Bamboo Lukoil	650
	3	(Sweden) WestCoast Racing	545
	4	(Germany) Liqui Moly Team Engstler	320
	5	(Spain) Campos Racing	44

- Note: Only the top five positions are included for both sets of drivers' standings.
