= 2015 TCR International Series Buriram round =

(Thailand) 2015 TCR International Series Buriram round
Round details
- Round 10 of 11 rounds in the 2015 TCR International Series
- Layout of the Chang International Circuit
- Location: Chang International Circuit, Buriram, Thailand
- Course: Permanent racing facility 4.554 km (2.830 mi)

TCR International Series

Race 1
- Date: 25 October 2015
- Laps: 14

Pole position
Driver	(Italy) Gianni Morbidelli	WestCoast Racing
- Time: 1:43.423

Podium
First	(Spain) Pepe Oriola	Team Craft-Bamboo Lukoil
Second	(Spain) Jordi Gené	Team Craft-Bamboo Lukoil
Third	(Russia) Sergey Afanasyev	Team Craft-Bamboo Lukoil

Fastest lap
Driver	(Italy) Gianni Morbidelli	WestCoast Racing
- Time: 1:44.121 (on lap 3)

Race 2
- Date: 25 October 2015
- Laps: 14

Podium
First	(Switzerland) Stefano Comini	Target Competition
Second	(Netherlands) Loris Hezemans	Target Competition
Third	(Spain) Pepe Oriola	Team Craft-Bamboo Lukoil

Fastest lap
Driver	(United States) Kevin Gleason	WestCoast Racing
- Time: 1:44.404 (on lap 7)

The 2015 TCR International Series Buriram round was the tenth round of the 2015 TCR International Series season as well as the third round of the 2015 TCR Asia Series season. It took place on 25 October at the Chang International Circuit.

Pepe Oriola won the first race, starting from second position, and Stefano Comini gained the second one, both driving a SEAT León Cup Racer.

== Success Ballast ==
Due to the results obtained in the previous round, Stefano Comini and Michael Choi received +30 kg, Kevin Gleason and Frank Yu +20 kg and Jordi Gené and George Chou +10 kg. Nevertheless, Yu and Chou didn't take part at this event, so they would have taken the ballast at the first round they would have participated.

== Classification ==
=== Qualifying ===
Pos.	No.	Driver	Car	Team	Q1	Q2	Grid	Points
1	10	(Italy) Gianni Morbidelli	Honda Civic Type R TCR (FK2)	(Sweden) WestCoast Racing	1:43.855	1:43.423	1	5
2	74	(Spain) Pepe Oriola	SEAT León Cup Racer	(United Kingdom) Team Craft-Bamboo Lukoil	1:44.301	1:43.601	2	4
3	24	(United States) Kevin Gleason	Honda Civic Type R TCR (FK2)	(Sweden) WestCoast Racing	1:44.015	1:43.792	3	3
4	77	(Russia) Sergey Afanasyev	SEAT León Cup Racer	(United Kingdom) Team Craft-Bamboo Lukoil	1:44.131	1:44.096	4	2
5	88	(Spain) Jordi Gené	SEAT León Cup Racer	(United Kingdom) Team Craft-Bamboo Lukoil	1:44.599	1:44.192	5	1
6	8	(Russia) Mikhail Grachev	Volkswagen Golf TCR	(Germany) Liqui Moly Team Engstler	1:44.608	1:44.484	6	
7	7	(Italy) Lorenzo Veglia	SEAT León Cup Racer	(Germany) Liqui Moly Team Engstler	1:44.749	1:44.506	7	
8	15	(Netherlands) Loris Hezemans	SEAT León Cup Racer	(Italy) Target Competition	1:44.494	1:44.513	8	
9	25	(Switzerland) Stefano Comini	SEAT León Cup Racer	(Italy) Target Competition	1:44.564	1:44.530	9	
10	45	(France) Hugo Valente	Opel Astra OPC	(Spain) Campos Racing	1:44.708	1:44.563	10	
11	23	(Germany) René Münnich	Honda Civic Type R TCR (FK2)	(Sweden) WestCoast Racing	1:44.483	1:44.746	11	
12	80	(Thailand) Munkong Sathienthirakul	SEAT León Cup Racer	(Hong Kong) Craft-Bamboo Racing	1:45.081	1:45.089	12	
13	4	(Sweden) Tomas Engström	Volkswagen Golf TCR	(Germany) Liqui Moly Team Engstler	1:45.342		13	
14	31	(Thailand) Tin Sritrai	SEAT León Cup Racer	(Macau) Asia Racing Team	1:45.387		14	
15	52	(Switzerland) Alain Menu	Subaru Impreza STi TCR	(Italy) Top Run Motorsport	1:45.984		15	
16	68	(Hong Kong) Michael Choi	Honda Civic Type R TCR (FK2)	(Hong Kong) Prince Racing	1:46.074		16	
17	35	(France) Rafaël Galiana	SEAT León Cup Racer	(Italy) Target Competition	1:46.330		17	
18	69	(China) Kevin Pu	SEAT León Cup Racer	(Macau) Asia Racing Team	1:46.399		18	
19	66	(Macau) Filipe de Souza	SEAT León Cup Racer	(Hong Kong) Roadstar Racing	1:46.932		24^{1}	
20	38	(Hong Kong) Kenneth Lau	Honda Civic Type R TCR (FK2)	(Hong Kong) Prince Racing	1:47.020		19	
21	27	(United States) Robb Holland	Ford Focus ST	(Hong Kong) FRD HK Racing	1:47.078		20	
22	97	(Taiwan) Johnson Huang	SEAT León Cup Racer	(Hong Kong) Roadstar Racing	1:47.689		21	
23	56	(Hong Kong) Samson Chan	SEAT León Cup Racer	(Hong Kong) Roadstar Racing	1:47.772		22	
24	65	(Malaysia) Douglas Khoo	SEAT León Cup Racer	(Malaysia) Niza Racing	1:55.241		23^{2}	

Notes:

- ^1 – Filipe de Souza's times were cancelled because of an irregular external assistance to get back on track after an accident.
- ^2 – Douglas Khoo was moved to the back of the grid for having not set a time within the 107% limit.

=== Race 1 ===
Pos.	No.	Driver	Car	Team	Laps	Time/Retired	Grid	Points
1	74	(Spain) Pepe Oriola	SEAT León Cup Racer	(United Kingdom) Team Craft-Bamboo Lukoil	14	24:34.075	2	25
2	88	(Spain) Jordi Gené	SEAT León Cup Racer	(United Kingdom) Team Craft-Bamboo Lukoil	14	+1.369	5	18
3	77	(Russia) Sergey Afanasyev	SEAT León Cup Racer	(United Kingdom) Team Craft-Bamboo Lukoil	14	+2.649	4	15
4	24	(United States) Kevin Gleason	Honda Civic Type R TCR (FK2)	(Sweden) WestCoast Racing	14	+3.517	3	12
5	25	(Switzerland) Stefano Comini	SEAT León Cup Racer	(Italy) Target Competition	14	+7.684	9	10
6	15	(Netherlands) Loris Hezemans	SEAT León Cup Racer	(Italy) Target Competition	14	+10.520	8	8
7	7	(Italy) Lorenzo Veglia	SEAT León Cup Racer	(Germany) Liqui Moly Team Engstler	14	+13.677	7	6
8	4	(Sweden) Tomas Engström	Volkswagen Golf TCR	(Germany) Liqui Moly Team Engstler	14	+15.558	13	4
9	23	(Germany) René Münnich	Honda Civic Type R TCR (FK2)	(Sweden) WestCoast Racing	14	+15.932	11	2
10	10	(Italy) Gianni Morbidelli	Honda Civic Type R TCR (FK2)	(Sweden) WestCoast Racing	14	+16.347	1	1
11	80	(Thailand) Munkong Sathienthirakul	SEAT León Cup Racer	(Hong Kong) Craft-Bamboo Racing	14	+19.201	12	
12	31	(Thailand) Tin Sritrai	SEAT León Cup Racer	(Macau) Asia Racing Team	14	+26.213	14	
13	69	(China) Kevin Pu	SEAT León Cup Racer	(Macau) Asia Racing Team	14	+37.257	18	
14	66	(Macau) Filipe de Souza	SEAT León Cup Racer	(Hong Kong) Roadstar Racing	14	+47.633	24	
15	38	(Hong Kong) Kenneth Lau	Honda Civic Type R TCR (FK2)	(Hong Kong) Prince Racing	14	+1:00.504	19	
16	97	(Taiwan) Johnson Huang	SEAT León Cup Racer	(Hong Kong) Roadstar Racing	14	+1:01.203	21	
17	56	(Hong Kong) Samson Chan	SEAT León Cup Racer	(Hong Kong) Roadstar Racing	14	+1:01.572	22	
18	68	(Hong Kong) Michael Choi	Honda Civic Type R TCR (FK2)	(Hong Kong) Prince Racing	14	+1:03.662	16	
19	65	(Malaysia) Douglas Khoo	SEAT León Cup Racer	(Malaysia) Niza Racing	14	+1:58.210	23	
20	52	(Switzerland) Alain Menu	Subaru Impreza STi TCR	(Italy) Top Run Motorsport	12	Differential	15	
21	45	(France) Hugo Valente	Opel Astra OPC	(Spain) Campos Racing	12	Overheating	12	
22	35	(France) Rafaël Galiana	SEAT León Cup Racer	(Italy) Target Competition	10	Puncture	17	
Ret	27	(United States) Robb Holland	Ford Focus ST	(Hong Kong) FRD HK Racing	6	Technical	20	
Ret	8	(Russia) Mikhail Grachev	Volkswagen Golf TCR	(Germany) Liqui Moly Team Engstler	1	Gearbox	6	

=== Race 2 ===
Pos.	No.	Driver	Car	Team	Laps	Time/Retired	Grid	Points
1	25	(Switzerland) Stefano Comini	SEAT León Cup Racer	(Italy) Target Competition	14	24:40.174	2	25
2	15	(Netherlands) Loris Hezemans	SEAT León Cup Racer	(Italy) Target Competition	14	+2.746	3	18
3	74	(Spain) Pepe Oriola	SEAT León Cup Racer	(United Kingdom) Team Craft-Bamboo Lukoil	14	+3.163	9	15
4	88	(Spain) Jordi Gené	SEAT León Cup Racer	(United Kingdom) Team Craft-Bamboo Lukoil	14	+4.098	6	12
5	7	(Italy) Lorenzo Veglia	SEAT León Cup Racer	(Germany) Liqui Moly Team Engstler	14	+15.594	4	10
6	4	(Sweden) Tomas Engström	Volkswagen Golf TCR	(Germany) Liqui Moly Team Engstler	14	+15.993	13	8
7	77	(Russia) Sergey Afanasyev	SEAT León Cup Racer	(United Kingdom) Team Craft-Bamboo Lukoil	14	+16.442	7	6
8	31	(Thailand) Tin Sritrai	SEAT León Cup Racer	(Macau) Asia Racing Team	14	+24.318	20^{3}	4
9	80	(Thailand) Munkong Sathienthirakul	SEAT León Cup Racer	(Hong Kong) Craft-Bamboo Racing	14	+25.773	12	2
10	35	(France) Rafaël Galiana	SEAT León Cup Racer	(Italy) Target Competition	14	+27.740	15	1
11	69	(China) Kevin Pu	SEAT León Cup Racer	(Macau) Asia Racing Team	14	+33.799	16	
12	66	(Macau) Filipe de Souza	SEAT León Cup Racer	(Hong Kong) Roadstar Racing	14	+37.157	19	
13	68	(Hong Kong) Michael Choi	Honda Civic Type R TCR (FK2)	(Hong Kong) Prince Racing	14	+41.082	14	
14	38	(Hong Kong) Kenneth Lau	Honda Civic Type R TCR (FK2)	(Hong Kong) Prince Racing	14	+41.988	17	
15	97	(Taiwan) Johnson Huang	SEAT León Cup Racer	(Hong Kong) Roadstar Racing	14	+52.669	18	
16	56	(Hong Kong) Samson Chan	SEAT León Cup Racer	(Hong Kong) Roadstar Racing	14	+1:08.725	23^{3}	
17	65	(Malaysia) Douglas Khoo	SEAT León Cup Racer	(Malaysia) Niza Racing	14	+1:30.432	24^{3}	
18	24	(United States) Kevin Gleason	Honda Civic Type R TCR (FK2)	(Sweden) WestCoast Racing	10	Retired	8	
Ret	10	(Italy) Gianni Morbidelli	Honda Civic Type R TCR (FK2)	(Sweden) WestCoast Racing	8	Engine	10	
Ret	23	(Germany) René Münnich	Honda Civic Type R TCR (FK2)	(Sweden) WestCoast Racing	8	Technical	11	
Ret	45	(France) Hugo Valente	Opel Astra OPC	(Spain) Campos Racing	0	Clutch	1	
DSQ	27	(United States) Robb Holland	Ford Focus ST	(Hong Kong) FRD HK Racing	14	+55.771^{4}	22^{3}	
DNS	8	(Russia) Mikhail Grachev	Volkswagen Golf TCR	(Germany) Liqui Moly Team Engstler		Gearbox	5	
DNS	52	(Switzerland) Alain Menu	Subaru Impreza STi TCR	(Italy) Top Run Motorsport		Differential	21^{3}	

Notes:

- ^3 – Tin Sritrai, Alain Menu, Robb Holland, Samson Chan and Douglas Khoo were moved to the back of the grid because of a parc fermé infringement.
- ^4 – Robb Holland was disqualified for not having served a drive through penalty.

== Standings after the event ==
Drivers' Championship standings

Pos	Driver	Points
1	(Switzerland) Stefano Comini	299
2	(Spain) Pepe Oriola	297
3	(Spain) Jordi Gené	265
4	(Italy) Gianni Morbidelli	223
5	(United States) Kevin Gleason	216

Teams' Championship standings

Pos	Driver	Points
1	(United Kingdom) Team Craft-Bamboo Lukoil	611
2	(Italy) Target Competition	598
3	(Sweden) WestCoast Racing	491
4	(Germany) Liqui Moly Team Engstler	295
5	(Spain) Campos Racing	43

- Note: Only the top five positions are included for both sets of drivers' standings.
