= 2014 Porsche Carrera Cup Asia =

Motorsport racing season

The 2014 Porsche Carrera Cup Asia was the twelfth season of the Porsche Carrera Cup Asia. The season commenced on March 30 at the Sepang International Circuit and finished at the Shanghai International Circuit on October 19.

In a dominant campaign, Earl Bamber successfully defended the championship, despite missing the third round in Zhuhai owing to Porsche Supercup commitments, to capture the title with one race to spare over Martin Ragginger. Alif Hamdan meanwhile claimed the B-Class championship in a similarly dominant effort.

== Calendar ==
The following venues hosted at least one round of the 2014 championship.

| Round | Circuit | Date | Supporting |
|---|---|---|---|
| 1 | Sepang International Circuit, Selangor, Malaysia | 28–30 March | Malaysian Grand Prix; Malaysian Super Series |
| 2 | Shanghai International Circuit, Shanghai, China | 18–20 April | Chinese Grand Prix |
| 3 | Zhuhai International Circuit, Zhuhai, China | 9–11 May | China GT Championship; Formula Masters China |
| 4 | Fuji Speedway, Oyama, Japan | 6–8 June | One Make Series Festival |
| 5 | Sepang International Circuit, Selangor, Malaysia | 15–17 August | Audi R8 LMS Cup; GT Asia Series; Formula Masters China |
| 6 | Marina Bay Street Circuit, Marina Bay, Singapore | 19–21 September | Singapore Grand Prix |
| 7 | Shanghai International Circuit, Shanghai, China | 17–19 October | Audi R8 LMS Cup; Formula Masters China; Volkswagen Scirocco R-Cup China |

== Teams and drivers ==
All entrants utilized the Porsche 997.2 GT3 Cup cars.

| Team | No. | Driver | Class | Rounds |
|---|---|---|---|---|
| (Hong Kong) LKM Racing Team | 1 | (New Zealand) Earl Bamber | | 1–2, 4–7 |
| (Hong Kong) LKM Racing Team | 22 | (New Zealand) Will Bamber | | 4 |
| (Hong Kong) LKM Racing Team | 22 | (Hong Kong) Siu Yuk Lung | B | 1–3, 5–7 |
| (Hong Kong) LKM Racing Team | 23 | (Hong Kong) Siu Tit Lung | B | 3 |
| (Hong Kong) Prince Racing | 2 | (Hong Kong) Kenneth Lau | B | 1–2, 4–5 |
| (Hong Kong) Prince Racing | 2 | (Hong Kong) Benny Lim | B | 3 |
| (Hong Kong) Prince Racing | 6 | (Hong Kong) Daniel Andrew Bilski | B | 1 |
| (Hong Kong) Prince Racing | 6 | (Hong Kong) Michael Choi | B | 2 |
| (Hong Kong) Prince Racing | 6 | (United Kingdom) Nigel Farmer | B | 3 |
| (Hong Kong) Prince Racing | 6 | (Hong Kong) John Wong | B | 4 |
| (Hong Kong) Prince Racing | 6 | (Chinese Taipei) Evan Chen | B | 5 |
| (Hong Kong) Kamlung Racing Team | 2 | (Hong Kong) Keith Chan | B | 6 |
| (Hong Kong) Kamlung Racing Team | 2 | (Hong Kong) Kelvin Kwan | B | 7 |
| (Hong Kong) Kamlung Racing Team | 6 | (Hong Kong) Thong Wei Fung | B | 6 |
| (Hong Kong) Kamlung Racing Team | 68 | (Hong Kong) Mak Hing Tak | B | 1–2, 4–7 |
| (Hong Kong) Kamlung Racing Team | 68 | (China) Li Zhicong | | 3 |
| (Hong Kong) OpenRoad Racing | 3 | (Hong Kong) Michael S. | B | 1–3, 5–7 |
| (Hong Kong) OpenRoad Racing | 3 | (Netherlands) Marcel Tjia | B | 4 |
| (Hong Kong) OpenRoad Racing | 21 | (Netherlands) Francis Tjia | B | All |
| (Singapore) Dorr Havelock Racing | 5 | (Singapore) Yuey Tan | B | All |
| (China) Team Synsanly | 7 | (China) Bao Jin Long | | All |
| (Singapore) Team Yongda Dongfang | 8 | (Singapore) Ro Charlz Skyangel | | All |
| (China) Team BetterLife | 9 | (China) Li Chao | | 1–5, 7 |
| (Singapore) Team Kangshun | 11 | (Singapore) Ringo Chong | | All |
| (Singapore) Clearwater Racing | 12 | (Singapore) Weng Mok Sun | B | 1–2, 6–7 |
| (Singapore) Clearwater Racing | 12 | (Singapore) Ian Tan Mao | B | 3 |
| (Singapore) Clearwater Racing | 12 | (Japan) Hiroshi Hamaguchi | B | 4 |
| (Singapore) Clearwater Racing | 12 | (Australia) Max Twigg | B | 5 |
| (Hong Kong) Modena Motorsports | 16 | (Hong Kong) Wayne Shen | B | All |
| (Hong Kong) Modena Motorsports | 28 | (Hong Kong) John Shen | B | All |
| (China) Team Basetex | 18 | (China) Zhang Zhendong | | All |
| (Hong Kong) Team Jebsen | 20 | (Macau) Rodolfo Ávila | | All |
| (Hong Kong) Samson Chan | 33 | (Hong Kong) Samson Chan | B | All |
| (Chinese Taipei) Team BC | 51 | (Chinese Taipei) Johnson Huang | B | All |
| (China) Zheng Tong Auto | 55 | (China) Zhang Dasheng | | All |
| (Hong Kong) Absolute Racing | 58 | (China) Ho-Pin Tung | | All |
| (China) Team C&D | 66 | (China) Zhang Zhi Qiang | | All |
| (Malaysia) Nexus Racing | 72 | (Malaysia) Alif Hamdan | B | All |
| (Hong Kong) Tiger Racing Team | 77 | (Hong Kong) Jacky Yeung | B | 1, 4, 6 |
| (Hong Kong) Tiger Racing Team | 77 | (Netherlands) Carlo van Dam | | 7 |
| (Hong Kong) Tiger Racing Team | 78 | (Hong Kong) Bentley Yeung | B | 2–3, 5 |
| (Germany) Team Porsche Holding | 86 | (Austria) Martin Ragginger | | All |
| (Singapore) Mentos Racing | 88 | (Norway) Egidio Perfetti | | All |
| (United States) Silicon Tech Racing LLP | 98 | (United States) Henri Richard | B | All |
| (Singapore) PICC Team StarChase | 99 | (Switzerland) Alexandre Imperatori | | All |

| Icon | Class |
|---|---|
| B | B Class |
| | Guest Starter |

== Results ==
| Round | | Circuit | Pole Position | Fastest Lap | Winning Driver | Winning Team | B-Class Winner |
|---|---|---|---|---|---|---|---|
| 1 | | (Malaysia) Sepang | (New Zealand) Earl Bamber | (Switzerland) Alexandre Imperatori | (New Zealand) Earl Bamber | (Hong Kong) LKM Racing Team | (Malaysia) Alif Hamdan |
| 2 | R1 | (China) Shanghai 1 | (New Zealand) Earl Bamber | (New Zealand) Earl Bamber | (New Zealand) Earl Bamber | (Hong Kong) LKM Racing Team | (Singapore) Yuey Tan |
| 2 | R2 | (China) Shanghai 1 | | (New Zealand) Earl Bamber | (Switzerland) Alexandre Imperatori | (Singapore) PICC Team StarChase | (Malaysia) Alif Hamdan |
| 3 | R1 | (China) Zhuhai | (Macau) Rodolfo Ávila | (Switzerland) Alexandre Imperatori | (Austria) Martin Ragginger | (Germany) Team Porsche Holding | (Malaysia) Alif Hamdan |
| 3 | R2 | (China) Zhuhai | Race cancelled | | | | |
| 4 | R1 | (Japan) Fuji | (New Zealand) Earl Bamber | (Austria) Martin Ragginger | (New Zealand) Earl Bamber | (Hong Kong) LKM Racing Team | (Malaysia) Alif Hamdan |
| 4 | R2 | (Japan) Fuji | | (New Zealand) Earl Bamber | (New Zealand) Earl Bamber | (Hong Kong) LKM Racing Team | (Japan) Hiroshi Hamaguchi |
| 5 | R1 | (Malaysia) Sepang | (Austria) Martin Ragginger | (New Zealand) Earl Bamber | (New Zealand) Earl Bamber | (Hong Kong) LKM Racing Team | (Malaysia) Alif Hamdan |
| 5 | R2 | (Malaysia) Sepang | | (Austria) Martin Ragginger | (Switzerland) Alexandre Imperatori | (Singapore) PICC Team StarChase | (Malaysia) Alif Hamdan |
| 6 | | Singapore | (New Zealand) Earl Bamber | (New Zealand) Earl Bamber | (New Zealand) Earl Bamber | (Hong Kong) LKM Racing Team | (Singapore) Yuey Tan |
| 7 | R1 | (China) Shanghai 2 | (New Zealand) Earl Bamber | (New Zealand) Earl Bamber | (New Zealand) Earl Bamber | (Hong Kong) LKM Racing Team | (Malaysia) Alif Hamdan |
| 7 | R2 | (China) Shanghai 2 | | (New Zealand) Earl Bamber | (New Zealand) Earl Bamber | (Hong Kong) LKM Racing Team | (Malaysia) Alif Hamdan |

== Championship standings ==
=== Scoring system ===
Points were awarded to the top fifteen classified drivers in every race, using the following system:

| Position | 1st | 2nd | 3rd | 4th | 5th | 6th | 7th | 8th | 9th | 10th | 11th | 12th | 13th | 14th | 15th | Pole |
| Points | 20 | 18 | 16 | 14 | 12 | 10 | 9 | 8 | 7 | 6 | 5 | 4 | 3 | 2 | 1 | 1 |

=== Overall ===
| Pos. | Driver | SEP (Malaysia) | SHA1 (China) | | ZHU (China) | | FUJ (Japan) | | SEP (Malaysia) | | SIN (Singapore) | SHA2 (China) | | Points |
| Pos. | Driver | R1 | R2 | R3 | R4 | R5 | R6 | R7 | R8 | R9 | R10 | R11 | R12 | Points |
|---|---|---|---|---|---|---|---|---|---|---|---|---|---|---|
| 1 | (New Zealand) Earl Bamber | 1 | 1 | 3 | | | 1 | 1 | 1 | 2 | 1 | 1 | 1 | 199 |
| 2 | (Austria) Martin Ragginger | 2 | 2 | 2 | 1 | C | 4 | 13 | 10 | 1 | 2 | 3 | 2 | 171 |
| 3 | (Switzerland) Alexandre Imperatori | 3 | 3 | 1 | 2 | C | Ret | 4 | 9 | 6 | 3 | 2 | 3 | 152 |
| 4 | (Macau) Rodolfo Ávila | Ret | 9 | 4 | 3 | C | 5 | 2 | 2 | 3 | 5 | 4 | 4 | 142 |
| 5 | (China) Ho-Pin Tung | 4 | 4 | 5 | 4 | C | 6 | 5 | 3 | 5 | 4 | 9 | 6 | 135 |
| 6 | (China) Zhang Dasheng | 5 | 5 | 11 | 10 | C | 3 | Ret | 5 | 7 | 6 | 6 | 11 | 98 |
| 7 | (China) Zhang Zhi Qiang | 6 | 6 | 8 | 9 | C | Ret | 3 | 6 | 14 | 9 | 7 | 5 | 92 |
| 8 | (Malaysia) Alif Hamdan | 8 | 12 | 9 | 7 | C | 2 | Ret | 4 | 4 | 17 | 8 | 10 | 89 |
| 9 | (China) Zhang Zhendong | 7 | 8 | 6 | 5 | C | Ret | DNS | 7 | 17 | 8 | 10 | 9 | 70 |
| 10 | (Singapore) Ro Charlz Skyangel | 9 | Ret | 10 | 14 | C | 7 | 7 | 15 | Ret | 7 | 5 | 8 | 65 |
| 11 | (Norway) Egidio Perfetti | 10 | 7 | 7 | 6 | C | Ret | 6 | Ret | 9 | 10 | 11 | Ret | 63 |
| 12 | (Singapore) Ringo Chong | 11 | DSQ | 12 | 15 | C | 10 | 11 | 11 | 11 | 12 | 14 | Ret | 39 |
| 13 | (Singapore) Yuey Tan | 18 | 10 | 15 | 13 | C | 11 | 10 | 17 | 10 | 11 | 15 | 13 | 38 |
| 14 | (Netherlands) Francis Tjia | 13 | 15 | 13 | 8 | C | 9 | 12 | 14 | 15 | 13 | 17 | 20 | 34 |
| 15 | (China) Li Chao | 12 | 16 | 14 | 11 | C | 8 | 15 | 13 | 16 | | Ret | 14 | 28 |
| 16 | (China) Bao Jin Long | Ret | Ret | 25 | 18 | C | 12 | DSQ | 12 | 13 | Ret | 13 | 12 | 21 |
| 17 | (United States) Henri Richard | 25 | 13 | 19 | 12 | C | Ret | 16 | 21 | 12 | 22 | Ret | 19 | 12 |
| 18 | (Hong Kong) Wayne Shen | 21 | 14 | 17 | Ret | C | 14 | 14 | 16 | 19 | 15 | 12 | 17 | 12 |
| 19 | (Singapore) Weng Mok Sun | 14 | 11 | 18 | | | | | | | 14 | 18 | Ret | 9 |
| 20 | (New Zealand) Will Bamber | | | | | | Ret | 8 | | | | | | 8 |
| 21 | (Japan) Hiroshi Hamaguchi | | | | | | Ret | 9 | | | | | | 7 |
| 22 | (Hong Kong) Samson Chan | Ret | 18 | 16 | 19 | C | 13 | 18 | 19 | Ret | 23 | 20 | 15 | 5 |
| 23 | (Hong Kong) John Shen | 16 | 17 | 21 | 16 | C | 16 | 17 | Ret | 18 | 16 | 16 | 16 | 1 |
| 24 | (Chinese Taipei) Johnson Huang | 22 | 19 | 22 | 23 | C | 15 | DNS | Ret | Ret | 21 | 21 | 21 | 1 |
| 25 | (Hong Kong) Siu Yuk Lung | 15 | DSQ | 20 | 21 | C | | | 22 | 22 | 26 | Ret | 22 | 1 |
| - | (Hong Kong) Mak Hing Tak | 17 | DSQ | 23 | | | Ret | 19 | 23 | 23 | 19 | 22 | 24 | 0 |
| - | (Hong Kong) Michael S. | 23 | 20 | DSQ | 20 | C | | | 20 | 20 | 24 | 19 | 18 | 0 |
| - | (Hong Kong) Kenneth Lau | 20 | DSQ | 27 | | | 17 | 22 | Ret | 21 | | | | 0 |
| - | (Hong Kong) Jacky Yeung | 19 | | | | | Ret | 20 | | | 25 | | | 0 |
| - | (Hong Kong) Bentley Yeung | | DSQ | 26 | DNS | C | | | Ret | 24 | | | | 0 |
| - | (Hong Kong) Michael Choi | | DSQ | 24 | | | | | | | | | | 0 |
| - | (United Kingdom) Nigel Farmer | | | | 17 | C | | | | | | | | 0 |
| - | (Hong Kong) Benny Lim | | | | 24 | C | | | | | | | | 0 |
| - | (Hong Kong) Siu Tit Lung | | | | Ret | C | | | | | | | | 0 |
| - | (China) Li Zhicong | | | | Ret | C | | | | | 18 | | | 0 |
Guest drivers ineligible for points
| - | (Netherlands) Carlo van Dam | | | | | | | | | | | 24 | 7 | 0 |
| - | (Australia) Max Twigg | | | | | | | | 8 | 8 | | | | 0 |
| - | (Chinese Taipei) Evan Chen | | | | | | | | 18 | Ret | | | | 0 |
| - | (Netherlands) Marcel Tjia | | | | | | 17 | 21 | | | | | | 0 |
| - | (Hong Kong) Keith Chan | | | | | | | | | | 20 | | | 0 |
| - | (Singapore) Ian Tan Mao | | | | 22 | C | | | | | | | | 0 |
| - | (Hong Kong) Kelvin Kwan | | | | | | | | | | | 23 | 22 | 0 |
| - | (Hong Kong) Daniel Andrew Bilski | 24 | | | | | | | | | | | | 0 |
| - | (Hong Kong) Thong Wei Fung | | | | | | | | | | Ret | | | 0 |
| - | (Hong Kong) John Wong | | | | | | Ret | 23 | | | | Ret | DNS | 0 |
| Pos. | Driver | R1 | R2 | R3 | R4 | R5 | R6 | R7 | R8 | R9 | R10 | R11 | R12 | Points |
| Pos. | Driver | SEP (Malaysia) | SHA1 (China) | | ZHU (China) | | FUJ (Japan) | | SEP (Malaysia) | | SIN (Singapore) | SHA2 (China) | | Points |

== See also ==
- 2014 Porsche Supercup
- 2014 Porsche Carrera Cup Germany
- 2014 Porsche Carrera Cup Great Britain
- 2014 Australian Carrera Cup Championship
- 2014 Porsche Carrera Cup Italia
