= 2015 TCR Asia Series =

Car racing competition

Seasons
- ← none 2016 →

The 2015 TCR Asia Series season was the first season of the TCR Asia Series. The season began at Sepang on 5 September and finished on 22 November at the Guia Circuit in Macau, after four rounds.

Michael Choi won the drivers' championship, driving a Honda Civic TCR, and Asia Racing Team won the teams' championship.

== Teams and drivers ==
Michelin is the official tyre supplier.

Team	Car	No.	Drivers	Rounds
(Hong Kong) FRD HK Racing	Ford Focus ST	13	(Hong Kong) Kenneth Ma	1–2
(Hong Kong) FRD HK Racing	Ford Focus ST	27	(United States) Robb Holland	3
(Hong Kong) FRD HK Racing	Ford Focus ST	63	(Hong Kong) Andy Yan	1
(Macau) Asia Racing Team	SEAT León Cup Racer	14	(France) Philippe Descombes	1
(Macau) Asia Racing Team	SEAT León Cup Racer	15	(Macau) Rodolfo Ávila	1
(Macau) Asia Racing Team	SEAT León Cup Racer	87	(Macau) Rodolfo Ávila	4
(Macau) Asia Racing Team	SEAT León Cup Racer	30	(Macau) Liu Lic Ka	1
(Macau) Asia Racing Team	SEAT León Cup Racer	31	(Thailand) Tin Sritrai	3
(Macau) Asia Racing Team	SEAT León Cup Racer	63	(Hong Kong) Sam Lok	4
(Macau) Asia Racing Team	SEAT León Cup Racer	69	(China) Kevin Pu	3
(Hong Kong) Roadstar Racing	SEAT León Cup Racer	27	(United States) Robb Holland	4
(Hong Kong) Roadstar Racing	SEAT León Cup Racer	56	(Hong Kong) Samson Chan	All
(Hong Kong) Roadstar Racing	SEAT León Cup Racer	66	(Macau) Filipe de Souza	1–3
(Hong Kong) Roadstar Racing	SEAT León Cup Racer	78	(Japan) Masahiko Ida	1
(Hong Kong) Roadstar Racing	SEAT León Cup Racer	78	(Taiwan) George Chou	2
(Hong Kong) Roadstar Racing	SEAT León Cup Racer	97	(Taiwan) Johnson Huang	3–4
(Hong Kong) Prince Racing	Honda Civic TCR	38	(Hong Kong) Kenneth Lau	All
(Hong Kong) Prince Racing	Honda Civic TCR	68	(Hong Kong) Michael Choi	All
(Spain) Campos Racing	Opel Astra OPC	44	(Hong Kong) Mak Hing Tak	2
(Malaysia) Niza Racing	SEAT León Cup Racer	65	(Malaysia) Douglas Khoo	3–4
(Hong Kong) Craft-Bamboo Racing	SEAT León Cup Racer	80	(Thailand) Munkong Sathienthirakul	3
(Hong Kong) Craft-Bamboo Racing	SEAT León Cup Racer	99	(Hong Kong) Eric Kwong	1
(Hong Kong) Craft-Bamboo Racing	SEAT León Cup Racer	99	(Hong Kong) Frank Yu	2, 4
(Malaysia) Wing Hin Motorsports	SEAT León Cup Racer	83	(Malaysia) Kenny Lee	1

== Calendar and results ==
The provisional 2015 schedule was announced on 23 December 2014. A revised calendar was announced on 25 February 2015. On 17 July the Zhuhai round, scheduled for 16 August, was removed.

Rnd.	Race	Circuit	Date	Pole position	Fastest lap	Winning driver	Winning team	Supporting
1	1	(Malaysia) Sepang International Circuit, Kuala Lumpur	5 September	(France) Philippe Descombes	(Macau) Rodolfo Ávila	(Macau) Rodolfo Ávila	(Macau) Asia Racing Team	GT Asia Series
1	2	(Malaysia) Sepang International Circuit, Kuala Lumpur	6 September	(Macau) Rodolfo Ávila	(France) Philippe Descombes	(France) Philippe Descombes	(Macau) Asia Racing Team	GT Asia Series
1	3	(Malaysia) Sepang International Circuit, Kuala Lumpur	6 September		(France) Philippe Descombes	(France) Philippe Descombes	(Macau) Asia Racing Team	GT Asia Series
2	4	Marina Bay Street Circuit, Singapore	19 September	(Taiwan) George Chou	(Hong Kong) Frank Yu	(Hong Kong) Michael Choi	(Hong Kong) Prince Racing	Singapore Grand Prix; TCR International Series Singapore round
2	5	Marina Bay Street Circuit, Singapore	20 September		(Taiwan) George Chou	(Hong Kong) Michael Choi	(Hong Kong) Prince Racing	Singapore Grand Prix; TCR International Series Singapore round
3	6	(Thailand) Chang International Circuit, Buriram	25 October	(Thailand) Munkong Sathienthirakul	(Thailand) Munkong Sathienthirakul	(Thailand) Munkong Sathienthirakul	(Hong Kong) Craft-Bamboo Racing	TCR International Series Buriram round GT Asia Series
3	7	(Thailand) Chang International Circuit, Buriram	25 October		(Thailand) Munkong Sathienthirakul	(Thailand) Tin Sritrai	(Macau) Asia Racing Team	TCR International Series Buriram round GT Asia Series
4	8	Guia Circuit, Macau	20–22 November	(Macau) Rodolfo Ávila	(Macau) Rodolfo Ávila	(Macau) Rodolfo Ávila	(Macau) Asia Racing Team	Macau Grand Prix; FIA GT World Cup; Guia Race of Macau
4	9	Guia Circuit, Macau	20–22 November		(United States) Robb Holland	(Macau) Rodolfo Ávila	(Macau) Asia Racing Team	Macau Grand Prix; FIA GT World Cup; Guia Race of Macau

== Championship standings ==
=== Drivers' championship ===
Pos.	Driver	SEP (Malaysia)			SIN (Singapore)		BUR (Thailand)		MAC (Macau)		Pts.
1	(Hong Kong) Michael Choi	3	2^{3}	Ret	1^{4}	1	8^{3}	5	3^{4}	Ret	122
2	(Macau) Rodolfo Ávila	1^{2}	**DNS**^{1}	DNS					**1**^{2}	**1**	89
3	(France) Philippe Descombes	**2**^{1}	1^{2}	**1**							77
4	(Hong Kong) Samson Chan	6	6	DSQ	3	6	7	8	4	Ret	61
5	(Macau) Filipe de Souza	8†	4	Ret	Ret^{3}	4	4	4			55
6	(Thailand) Munkong Sathienthirakul						**1**^{1}	**2**			48
7	(Thailand) Tin Sritrai						2^{2}	1			47
8	(Hong Kong) Kenneth Lau	4^{5}	DSQ^{4}	DNS	NC^{5}	5	5^{5}	6	Ret^{5}	DNS	46
9	(Hong Kong) Eric Kwong	5	3	2							43
10	(Hong Kong) Frank Yu				2^{2}	3			Ret^{2}	DNS	41
11	(United States) Robb Holland						Ret	DSQ	2^{3}	2	39
12	(Taiwan) George Chou				**4**^{1}	**2**					35
13	(China) Kevin Pu						3^{4}	3			32
14	(Japan) Masahiko Ida	7	5	3							31
15	(Macau) Liu Lic Ka	DNS	7	4							18
16	(Taiwan) Johnson Huang						6	7	DNQ	DNQ	14
17	(Malaysia) Douglas Khoo						9	9	DNQ	DNQ	4
18	(Hong Kong) Andy Yan	Ret^{3}	Ret	Ret							3
19	(Malaysia) Kenny Lee	Ret^{4}	DNS^{5}	DNS							3
	(Hong Kong) Kenneth Ma	DNS	DNS	DNS	DNS	Ret					0
	(Hong Kong) Mak Hing Tak				DNS	DNS					0
	(Hong Kong) Sam Lok								DNQ	DNQ	0
Pos.	Driver	SEP (Malaysia)			SIN (Singapore)		BUR (Thailand)		MAC (Macau)		Pts.

Colour	Result
Gold	Winner
Silver	Second place
Bronze	Third place
Green	Points classification
Blue	Non-points classification
Blue	Non-classified finish (NC)
Purple	Retired, not classified (Ret)
Red	Did not qualify (DNQ)
Red	Did not pre-qualify (DNPQ)
Black	Disqualified (DSQ)
White	Did not start (DNS)
White	Withdrew (WD)
White	Race cancelled (C)
Blank	Did not practice (DNP)
Blank	Did not arrive (DNA)
Blank	Excluded (EX)

**Bold** – Pole
Italics – Fastest Lap

† – Drivers did not finish the race, but were classified as they completed over 75% of the race distance.

=== Teams' Championship ===
Pos.	Team	SEP (Malaysia)			SIN (Singapore)		BUR (Thailand)		MAC (Macau)		Pts.
1	(Macau) Asia Racing Team	1^{1}	1^{1}	1			2^{2}	1	1^{1}	1	265
1	(Macau) Asia Racing Team	2^{2}	7^{2}	4			3^{4}	3	DNQ	DNQ	265
2	(Hong Kong) Roadstar Racing	6	4	3	3^{1}	2	4	4	2^{3}	2	198
2	(Hong Kong) Roadstar Racing	7	5	Ret	4^{3}	4	6	7	4	Ret	198
3	(Hong Kong) Prince Racing	3^{5}	2^{3}	Ret	1^{4}	1	5^{3}	5	3^{4}	Ret	170
3	(Hong Kong) Prince Racing	4	DSQ^{4}	DNS	NC^{5}	5	8^{5}	6	Ret^{5}	DNS	170
4	(Hong Kong) Craft-Bamboo Racing	5	3	2	2^{4}	3	1^{1}	2	Ret^{2}	DNS	132
6	(Malaysia) Niza Racing						9	9	DNQ	DNQ	8
7	(Hong Kong) FRD HK Racing	Ret^{3}	Ret	Ret	DNS	Ret	Ret	DSQ			3
7	(Hong Kong) FRD HK Racing	DNS	DNS	DNS							3
8	(Malaysia) Wing Hin Motorsports	Ret^{4}	DNS^{5}	DNS							3
	(Spain) Campos Racing				DNS	DNS					0
Pos.	Driver	SEP (Malaysia)			SIN (Singapore)		BUR (Thailand)		MAC (Macau)		Pts.

Colour	Result
Gold	Winner
Silver	Second place
Bronze	Third place
Green	Points classification
Blue	Non-points classification
Blue	Non-classified finish (NC)
Purple	Retired, not classified (Ret)
Red	Did not qualify (DNQ)
Red	Did not pre-qualify (DNPQ)
Black	Disqualified (DSQ)
White	Did not start (DNS)
White	Withdrew (WD)
White	Race cancelled (C)
Blank	Did not practice (DNP)
Blank	Did not arrive (DNA)
Blank	Excluded (EX)

**Bold** – Pole
Italics – Fastest Lap

† – Drivers did not finish the race, but were classified as they completed over 75% of the race distance.
