= 2015 Porsche Carrera Cup Asia =

Motorsport racing season

The 2015 Porsche Carrera Cup Asia was the thirteenth season of the Porsche Carrera Cup Asia. The season commenced on April 10 at the Shanghai International Circuit and finished at the same circuit on November 1.

Chris van der Drift won the championship having won half of the races in the schedule, with an 18-point deficit over fellow countryman, Craig Baird. Singaporean driver Yuey Tan secured the B-Class championship by one point over Vutthikorn Inthraphuvasak.

== Calendar ==
The following venues hosted at least one round of the 2015 championship.

Round	Circuit	Date	Supporting
1	Shanghai International Circuit, Shanghai, China	10–12 April	Chinese Grand Prix; TCR International Series
2	Korea International Circuit, Yeongam County, South Korea	15–17 May	Audi R8 LMS Cup; GT Asia Series
3	Fuji Speedway, Oyama, Japan	5–7 June	Japanese Formula 3 Championship; Porsche Carrera Cup Japan
4	Buriram International Circuit, Buriram Province, Thailand	31 July–2 August	Thailand Super Series
5	Sepang International Circuit, Selangor, Malaysia	4–6 September	Audi R8 LMS Cup; GT Asia Series; TCR Asia Series
6	Marina Bay Street Circuit, Marina Bay, Singapore	18–20 September	Singapore Grand Prix; TCR International Series; TCR Asia Series
7	Shanghai International Circuit, Shanghai, China	30 October–1 November	FIA World Endurance Championship; Audi R8 LMS Cup

== Teams and drivers ==
Team	No.	Driver	Class	Rounds
(Hong Kong) Prince Racing	2	(Hong Kong) Samson Chan	B	1, 3
(Hong Kong) Prince Racing	2	(Hong Kong) Kenneth Lau	B	2
(Malaysia) Arrows Racing	2	(Chinese Taipei) Evan Chen	B	4
(Malaysia) Arrows Racing	2	(Hong Kong) Kelvin Kwan	B	5–7
(Malaysia) Arrows Racing	17	(Hong Kong) Fung Yui Sum	B	All
(Malaysia) Arrows Racing	98	(Chinese Taipei) Max Chen	B	4
(Hong Kong) OpenRoad Racing	3	(Hong Kong) Michael S.	B	All
(Hong Kong) OpenRoad Racing	21	(Hong Kong) Francis Tjia	B	All
(Hong Kong) OpenRoad Racing	60	(Hong Kong) Marcel Tjia	B	4–6
(Hong Kong) OpenRoad Racing	69	(Canada) Christian Chia	B	1, 3
(Hong Kong) OpenRoad Racing	69	(Hong Kong) Gary Cheung	B	2
(Hong Kong) Team Jebsen	5	(Singapore) Yuey Tan	B	All
(Hong Kong) Team Jebsen	21	(Macau) Rodolfo Ávila		All
(China) Team Yonda Dongfang	8	(Singapore) Ro Charlz Skyangel		All
(China) Team BetterLife	9	(China) Li Chao		All
(South Korea) Team Porsche Korea	11	(South Korea) Récardo Bruins Choi		2
(Singapore) Team Kangshun	11	(Indonesia) Anderson P. Martono	B	1
(Singapore) Team Kangshun	11	(Singapore) Ringo Chong	B	3, 5–7
(Singapore) Team Kangshun	11	(Finland) Mikko Petteri Nässi	B	4
(Singapore) Clearwater Racing	12	(New Zealand) Craig Baird		All
(Hong Kong) Modena Motorsports	16	(Hong Kong) Wayne Shen	B	All
(Hong Kong) Modena Motorsports	28	(Hong Kong) John Shen	B	All
(Thailand) Chang Racing Team	18	(Thailand) Vutthikorn Inthraphuvasak	B	All
(Hong Kong) LKM Racing Team	22	(Hong Kong) Siu Tit Lung	B	1
(Hong Kong) LKM Racing Team	22	(Hong Kong) Siu Yuk Lung	B	2–7
(Australia) Paul Tresidder Racing	23	(Australia) Paul Tresidder	B	All
(Chinese Taipei) BC Racing	51	(Chinese Taipei) Johnson Huang	B	All
(China) Zheng Tong Auto	55	(China) Bao Jin Long		All
(Hong Kong) Absolute Racing	58	(China) Ho-Pin Tung		All
(Hong Kong) Absolute Racing	65	(China) Zhu Junhan	B	All
(Hong Kong) Kamlung Racing Team	68	(New Zealand) Chris van der Drift		All
(Malaysia) Alif Hamdan Motorsports	72	(Malaysia) Alif Hamdan		All
True Vision Motorsports Thailand	78	(Thailand) Suttiluck Buncharoen	B	All
Racing Spirit Thailand	80	(Thailand) Sontaya Kunplome	B	All
(Germany) Team Porsche Holding	86	(Austria) Martin Ragginger		1, 3–7
(Germany) Team Porsche Holding	86	(China) Zhang Zhendong		2
(Hong Kong) Spark Motorsport	88	(France) Hugues Ripert	B	1, 3, 7
(Hong Kong) Spark Motorsport	88	(Norway) Egidio Perfetti	B	2
(Hong Kong) Spark Motorsport	88	(Hong Kong) Daniel Andrew Bilski	B	4
(United States) Silicon Tech Racing LLP	98	(Australia) Max Twigg	B	1–2
(United States) Silicon Tech Racing LLP	98	(United States) Henri Richard	B	3, 5–6
(Singapore) PICC Team StarCase	99	(Germany) Nico Menzel		All

Icon	Class
B	B Class
	Guest Starter

== Results ==
Round		Circuit	Pole Position	Fastest Lap	Winning Driver	Winning Team	B-Class Winner
1	R1	(China) Shanghai 1	(Macau) Rodolfo Ávila		(New Zealand) Craig Baird	(Singapore) Clearwater Racing	(Australia) Max Twigg
1	R2	(China) Shanghai 1		(Germany) Nico Menzel	(China) Ho-Pin Tung	(Hong Kong) Team Jebsen	(Hong Kong) Wayne Shen
2	R1	(South Korea) Korea	(New Zealand) Chris van der Drift	(South Korea) Récardo Bruins Choi	(New Zealand) Chris van der Drift	(Hong Kong) Kamlung Racing Team	(Norway) Egidio Perfetti
2	R2	(South Korea) Korea		(New Zealand) Craig Baird	(New Zealand) Chris van der Drift	(Hong Kong) Kamlung Racing Team	(Norway) Egidio Perfetti
3	R1	(Japan) Fuji	(Austria) Martin Ragginger	(Malaysia) Alif Hamdan	(New Zealand) Chris van der Drift	(Hong Kong) Kamlung Racing Team	(Thailand) Vutthikorn Inthraphuvasak
3	R2	(Japan) Fuji		(China) Ho-Pin Tung	(New Zealand) Chris van der Drift	(Hong Kong) Kamlung Racing Team	(Hong Kong) Francis Tjia
4	R1	(Thailand) Buriram	(New Zealand) Chris van der Drift	(New Zealand) Chris van der Drift	(New Zealand) Chris van der Drift	(Hong Kong) Kamlung Racing Team	(Chinese Taipei) Evan Chen
4	R2	(Thailand) Buriram		(Germany) Nico Menzel	(New Zealand) Chris van der Drift	(Hong Kong) Kamlung Racing Team	(Chinese Taipei) Evan Chen
5	R1	(Malaysia) Sepang	(Austria) Martin Ragginger	(Austria) Martin Ragginger	(Germany) Nico Menzel	(Singapore) PICC Team StarChase	(Thailand) Vutthikorn Inthraphuvasak
5	R2	(Malaysia) Sepang		(New Zealand) Chris van der Drift	(New Zealand) Chris van der Drift	(Hong Kong) Kamlung Racing Team	(Thailand) Vutthikorn Inthraphuvasak
6	R1	Singapore	(New Zealand) Craig Baird		(New Zealand) Craig Baird	(Singapore) Clearwater Racing	(Thailand) Vutthikorn Inthraphuvasak
6	R2	Singapore			(China) Ho-Pin Tung	(Hong Kong) Absolute Racing	(Hong Kong) Francis Tjia
7	R1	(China) Shanghai 2	(Austria) Martin Ragginger	(Austria) Martin Ragginger	(Austria) Martin Ragginger	(Germany) Team Porsche Holding	(Thailand) Vutthikorn Inthraphuvasak
7	R2	(China) Shanghai 2		(Germany) Nico Menzel	(Germany) Nico Menzel	(Singapore) PICC Team StarChase	(Thailand) Vutthikorn Inthraphuvasak

== Championship standings ==
=== Scoring system ===
Points were awarded to the top fifteen classified drivers in every race, using the following system:

Position	1st	2nd	3rd	4th	5th	6th	7th	8th	9th	10th	11th	12th	13th	14th	15th	Pole
Points	20	18	16	14	12	10	9	8	7	6	5	4	3	2	1	1

=== Overall ===
Pos.	Driver	SHA1 (China)		KOR (South Korea)		FUJ (Japan)		BUR (Thailand)		SEP (Malaysia)		SIN (Singapore)		SHA2 (China)		Points
Pos.	Driver	R1	R2	R3	R4	R5	R6	R7	R8	R9	R10	R11	R12	R13	R14	Points
1	(New Zealand) Chris van der Drift	2	Ret	1	1	1	1	1	1	4	1	5	3	2	4	234
2	(New Zealand) Craig Baird	1	4	2	2	3	7	3	4	3	4	1	2	6	5	216
3	(Germany) Nico Menzel	7	13	5	4	6	5	2	2	1	3	3	6	4	1	192
4	(China) Ho-Pin Tung	5	1	Ret	Ret	7	3	5	3	6	Ret	2	1	5	3	161
5	(Austria) Martin Ragginger	3	3			2	2	4	DNS	2	2			1	2	159
6	(Macau) Rodolfo Ávila	4	2	12	Ret	4	4	Ret	Ret	5	7	4	4	3	7	140
7	(Malaysia) Alif Hamdan	Ret	8	4	8	5	6	Ret	DNS	11	6	Ret	5	7	6	101
8	(Singapore) Ro Charlz Skyangel	6	5	6	7	8	8	18	5	Ret	9	10	Ret	8	15	96
9	(Thailand) Vutthikorn Inthraphuvasak	15	Ret	9	Ret	9	Ret	7	7	9	8	7	10	9	8	80
10	(Hong Kong) Francis Tjia	13	Ret	11	10	10	9	8	8	Ret	15	8	7	11	17	67
11	(Hong Kong) Wayne Shen	10	7	13	14	13	16	11	13	10	12	9	12	10	9	67
12	(Singapore) Yuey Tan	9	11	15	12	12	10	10	10	12	11	Ret	8	12	11	67
13	(China) Bao Jing Long	11	6	14	9	11	11	Ret	9	8	10	Ret	14	DNS	10	65
14	(China) Li Chao	14	15	21	13	22	Ret	9	11	13	14	11	11	14	13	40
15	(South Korea) Récardo Bruins Choi			3	3											32
16	(China) Zhang Zhendong			7	5											21
17	(Chinese Taipei) Johnson Huang	16	9	18	15	18	15	12	12	Ret	DNS	12	17	20	18	21
18	(Chinese Taipei) Evan Chen							6	6							20
19	(Hong Kong) Michael S.	18	12	16	Ret	14	Ret	22	15	21	Ret	11	13	16	12	20
20	(Australia) Max Twigg	8	Ret	10	11											19
21	(Singapore) Ringo Chong					16	13			15	13	Ret	9	13	Ret	19
22	(Norway) Egidio Perfetti			8	6					7	5					18
23	(Thailand) Suttiluck Buncharoen	22	Ret	20	16	21	Ret	13	14	17	16	16	16	17	14	8
24	(Hong Kong) Samson Chan	19	10			15	18									7
25	(Canada) Christian Chia	17	Ret			17	12							15	16	5
26	(Hong Kong) John Shen	20	Ret	19	18	19	Ret	19	Ret	14	19	14	18	19	19	5
27	(Indonesia) Anderson P. Martono	12	17													4
28	(Australia) Paul Tresidder		16	17	20	23	17	Ret	Ret	18	18	13	19	18	20	3
29	(Hong Kong) Marcel Tjia							14	Ret	20	21	15	20			3
30	(France) Hugues Ripert	23	14			25	20							23	21	2
31	(United States) Henri Richard					20	14			Ret	DNS	DNS	DNS			2
32	(China) Zhu Junhan	21	Ret	Ret	17	26	DNS	16	17	16	17	18	15	21	Ret	2
33	(Chinese Taipei) Max Chen							15	16							1
-	(Thailand) Sontaya Kunplome	Ret	18	25	24	27	21	20	19	23	22	17	21	24	22	0
-	(Hong Kong) Siu Yuk Lung			23	21	28	22	17	18	22	20	19	23	22	23	0
-	(Hong Kong) Fung Yui Sum	Ret	Ret	24	19	24	19	21	Ret	Ret	Ret	20	22	25	Ret	0
-	(Hong Kong) Kenneth Lau			22	23											0
-	(Hong Kong) Gary Cheung			26	22											0
-	(Finland) Mikko Petteri Nässi							Ret	Ret							0
-	(Hong Kong) Kelvin Kwan									19	23	21	24	26	24	0
-	(Hong Kong) Siu Tit Lung	Ret	Ret													0
-	(Hong Kong) Daniel Andrew Bilski							Ret	Ret							0
Pos.	Driver	R1	R2	R3	R4	R5	R6	R7	R8	R9	R10	R11	R12	R13	R14	Points
Pos.	Driver	SHA1 (China)		KOR (South Korea)		FUJ (Japan)		BUR (Thailand)		SEP (Malaysia)		SIN (Singapore)		SHA2 (China)		Points

== See also ==
- 2015 Porsche Supercup
- 2015 Porsche Carrera Cup Germany
- 2015 Porsche Carrera Cup Great Britain
- 2015 Australian Carrera Cup Championship
- 2015 Porsche Carrera Cup Italia
