= 2015 TCR International Series Singapore round =

Round details
- Round 9 of 11 rounds in the 2015 TCR International Series
- Layout of the Marina Bay Street Circuit
- Location: Marina Bay Street Circuit, Marina Bay, Singapore
- Course: Permanent racing facility 5.065 km (3.147 mi)

TCR International Series

Race 1
- Date: 19 September 2015
- Laps: 10

Pole position
Driver	(Switzerland) Stefano Comini	Target Competition
- Time: 2:26.404

Podium
First	(United States) Kevin Gleason	WestCoast Racing
Second	(Switzerland) Stefano Comini	Target Competition
Third	(Italy) Gianni Morbidelli	WestCoast Racing

Fastest lap
Driver	(Italy) Gianni Morbidelli	WestCoast Racing
- Time: 2:26.693 (on lap 4)

Race 2
- Date: 20 September 2015
- Laps: 10

Podium
First	(Spain) Jordi Gené	Team Craft-Bamboo Lukoil
Second	(Switzerland) Stefano Comini	Target Competition
Third	(Spain) Pepe Oriola	Team Craft-Bamboo Lukoil

Fastest lap
Driver	(Spain) Jordi Gené	Team Craft-Bamboo Lukoil
- Time: 2:27.056 (on lap 3)

The 2015 TCR International Series Singapore round was the ninth round of the 2015 TCR International Series season as well as the second round of the 2015 TCR Asia Series season. It took place on 19–20 September at the Marina Bay Street Circuit.

Kevin Gleason won the first race, starting from third position, driving a Honda Civic Type R TCR (FK2), and Jordi Gené gained the second one, driving a SEAT León Cup Racer.

== Success Ballast ==
Due to the results obtained in the previous round and in the Sepang round of the TCR Asia Series, Pepe Oriola and Philippe Descombes received +30 kg, Stefano Comini and Eric Kwong +20 kg and Jordi Gené and Michael Choi +10 kg. Nevertheless, Descombes and Kwong didn't take part at this event, so they will take the ballast at the first round they will participate.

== Classification ==
=== Qualifying ===
Pos.	No.	Driver	Car	Team	Q1	Q2	Grid	Points
1	25	(Switzerland) Stefano Comini	SEAT León Cup Racer	(Italy) Target Competition	2:26.950	2:26.404	1	5
2	10	(Italy) Gianni Morbidelli	Honda Civic Type R TCR (FK2)	(Sweden) WestCoast Racing	2:28.284	2:26.420	2	4
3	24	(United States) Kevin Gleason	Honda Civic Type R TCR (FK2)	(Sweden) WestCoast Racing	2:29.085	2:26.724	3	3
4	77	(Russia) Sergey Afanasyev	SEAT León Cup Racer	(United Kingdom) Team Craft-Bamboo Lukoil	2:27.675	2:26.740	4	2
5	74	(Spain) Pepe Oriola	SEAT León Cup Racer	(United Kingdom) Team Craft-Bamboo Lukoil	2:27.848	2:26.760	5	1
6	15	(Netherlands) Loris Hezemans	SEAT León Cup Racer	(Italy) Target Competition	2:26.778	2:26.887	6	
7	8	(Russia) Mikhail Grachev	Volkswagen Golf TCR	(Germany) Liqui Moly Team Engstler	2:28.564	2:26.947	7	
8	7	(Italy) Lorenzo Veglia	SEAT León Cup Racer	(Germany) Liqui Moly Team Engstler	2:28.733	2:27.082	8	
9	88	(Spain) Jordi Gené	SEAT León Cup Racer	(United Kingdom) Team Craft-Bamboo Lukoil	2:27.594	2:27.294	9	
10	4	(Sweden) Tomas Engström	Volkswagen Golf TCR	(Germany) Liqui Moly Team Engstler	2:29.983	2:27.656	10	
11	23	(Germany) René Münnich	Honda Civic Type R TCR (FK2)	(Sweden) WestCoast Racing	2:29.495	2:28.271	11	
12	22	(Spain) Fernando Monje	Opel Astra OPC	(Spain) Campos Racing	2:29.690	2:28.904	12	
13	78	(Taiwan) George Chou	SEAT León Cup Racer	(Hong Kong) Roadstar Racing	2:30.938		13	
14	99	(Hong Kong) Frank Yu	SEAT León Cup Racer	(Hong Kong) Craft-Bamboo Racing	2:31.352		14	
15	35	(France) Rafaël Galiana	SEAT León Cup Racer	(Italy) Target Competition	2:31.858		15	
16	66	(Macau) Filipe de Souza	SEAT León Cup Racer	(Hong Kong) Roadstar Racing	2:32.491		16	
17	68	(Hong Kong) Michael Choi	Honda Civic Type R TCR (FK2)	(Hong Kong) Prince Racing	2:33.044		17	
18	38	(Hong Kong) Kenneth Lau	Honda Civic Type R TCR (FK2)	(Hong Kong) Prince Racing	2:33.525		18	
19	56	(Hong Kong) Samson Chan	SEAT León Cup Racer	(Hong Kong) Roadstar Racing	2:34.975		19	
20	13	(Hong Kong) Kenneth Ma	Ford Focus ST	(Hong Kong) FRD HK Racing	2:40.727		20^{1}	
21	44	(Hong Kong) Mak Hing Tak	Opel Astra OPC	(Spain) Campos Racing	2:48.194		21^{1}	
22	51	(Italy) Luca Rangoni	Subaru Impreza STi TCR	(Italy) Top Run Motorsport	no time		22^{1}	

Notes:

- ^1 — Kenneth Ma, Mak Hing Tak and Luca Rangoni were moved to the back of the grid for having not set a time within the 107% limit.

=== Race 1 ===
Pos.	No.	Driver	Car	Team	Laps	Time/Retired	Grid	Points
1	24	(United States) Kevin Gleason	Honda Civic Type R TCR (FK2)	(Sweden) WestCoast Racing	10	24:42.376	3	25
2	25	(Switzerland) Stefano Comini	SEAT León Cup Racer	(Italy) Target Competition	10	+0.819	1	18
3	10	(Italy) Gianni Morbidelli	Honda Civic Type R TCR (FK2)	(Sweden) WestCoast Racing	10	+4.730	2	15
4	74	(Spain) Pepe Oriola	SEAT León Cup Racer	(United Kingdom) Team Craft-Bamboo Lukoil	10	+5.140	5	12
5	77	(Russia) Sergey Afanasyev	SEAT León Cup Racer	(United Kingdom) Team Craft-Bamboo Lukoil	10	+7.752	4	10
6	88	(Spain) Jordi Gené	SEAT León Cup Racer	(United Kingdom) Team Craft-Bamboo Lukoil	10	+8.076	9	8
7	8	(Russia) Mikhail Grachev	Volkswagen Golf TCR	(Germany) Liqui Moly Team Engstler	10	+13.970	7	6
8	7	(Italy) Lorenzo Veglia	SEAT León Cup Racer	(Germany) Liqui Moly Team Engstler	10	+14.655	8	4
9	15	(Netherlands) Loris Hezemans	SEAT León Cup Racer	(Italy) Target Competition	10	+15.474	6	2
10	22	(Spain) Fernando Monje	Opel Astra OPC	(Spain) Campos Racing	10	+23.104	12	1
11	23	(Germany) René Münnich	Honda Civic Type R TCR (FK2)	(Sweden) WestCoast Racing	10	+24.753	11	
12	4	(Sweden) Tomas Engström	Volkswagen Golf TCR	(Germany) Liqui Moly Team Engstler	10	+42.759	10	
13	35	(France) Rafaël Galiana	SEAT León Cup Racer	(Italy) Target Competition	10	+47.875	15	
14	68	(Hong Kong) Michael Choi	Honda Civic Type R TCR (FK2)	(Hong Kong) Prince Racing	10	+1:22.857	17	
15	51	(Italy) Luca Rangoni	Subaru Impreza STi TCR	(Italy) Top Run Motorsport	10	+1:40.389	22	
16	99	(Hong Kong) Frank Yu	SEAT León Cup Racer	(Hong Kong) Craft-Bamboo Racing	10	+1:57.228	14	
17	56	(Hong Kong) Samson Chan	SEAT León Cup Racer	(Hong Kong) Roadstar Racing	10	+2:08.503	19^{2}	
18	78	(Taiwan) George Chou	SEAT León Cup Racer	(Hong Kong) Roadstar Racing	9	+1 lap	13	
NC	38	(Hong Kong) Kenneth Lau	Honda Civic Type R TCR (FK2)	(Hong Kong) Prince Racing	3	+7 laps	18	
Ret	66	(Macau) Filipe de Souza	SEAT León Cup Racer	(Hong Kong) Roadstar Racing	0	Collision	16	
DNS	13	(Hong Kong) Kenneth Ma	Ford Focus ST	(Hong Kong) FRD HK Racing		Technical	20	
DNS	44	(Hong Kong) Mak Hing Tak	Opel Astra OPC	(Spain) Campos Racing		Accident	21	

Notes:

- ^2 — Samson Chan was given a five-place grid penalty for causing a collision with Filipe de Souza in the Sepang round of the TCR Asia Series.

=== Race 2 ===
Pos.	No.	Driver	Car	Team	Laps	Time/Retired	Grid	Points
1	88	(Spain) Jordi Gené	SEAT León Cup Racer	(United Kingdom) Team Craft-Bamboo Lukoil	10	24:49.621	2	25
2	25	(Switzerland) Stefano Comini	SEAT León Cup Racer	(Italy) Target Competition	10	+3.637	10	18
3	88	(Spain) Pepe Oriola	SEAT León Cup Racer	(United Kingdom) Team Craft-Bamboo Lukoil	10	+5.492	6	15
4	10	(Italy) Gianni Morbidelli	Honda Civic Type R TCR (FK2)	(Sweden) WestCoast Racing	10	+11.054	9	12
5	24	(United States) Kevin Gleason	Honda Civic Type R TCR (FK2)	(Sweden) WestCoast Racing	10	+14.779	8	10
6	7	(Italy) Lorenzo Veglia	SEAT León Cup Racer	(Germany) Liqui Moly Team Engstler	10	+18.234	3	8
7	8	(Russia) Mikhail Grachev	Volkswagen Golf TCR	(Germany) Liqui Moly Team Engstler	10	+22.762	4	6
8	15	(Netherlands) Loris Hezemans	SEAT León Cup Racer	(Italy) Target Competition	10	+25.386	5	4
9	4	(Sweden) Tomas Engström	Volkswagen Golf TCR	(Germany) Liqui Moly Team Engstler	10	+31.556	1	2
10	23	(Germany) René Münnich	Honda Civic Type R TCR (FK2)	(Sweden) WestCoast Racing	10	+34.727	11	1
11	35	(France) Rafaël Galiana	SEAT León Cup Racer	(Italy) Target Competition	10	+48.524^{3}	14	
12	68	(Hong Kong) Michael Choi	Honda Civic Type R TCR (FK2)	(Hong Kong) Prince Racing	10	+1:09.071	15	
13	78	(Taiwan) George Chou	SEAT León Cup Racer	(Hong Kong) Roadstar Racing	10	+1:15.970	18^{4}	
14	99	(Hong Kong) Frank Yu	SEAT León Cup Racer	(Hong Kong) Craft-Bamboo Racing	10	+1:16.960	13	
15	66	(Macau) Filipe de Souza	SEAT León Cup Racer	(Hong Kong) Roadstar Racing	10	+1:25.222	19^{4}	
16	38	(Hong Kong) Kenneth Lau	Honda Civic Type R TCR (FK2)	(Hong Kong) Prince Racing	10	+1:26.017^{3}	16	
17	56	(Hong Kong) Samson Chan	SEAT León Cup Racer	(Hong Kong) Roadstar Racing	10	+2:20.958	17	
18	77	(Russia) Sergey Afanasyev	SEAT León Cup Racer	(United Kingdom) Team Craft-Bamboo Lukoil	9	Collision	7	
19	22	(Spain) Fernando Monje	Opel Astra OPC	(Spain) Campos Racing	7	Technical	12	
Ret	51	(Italy) Luca Rangoni	Subaru Impreza STi TCR	(Italy) Top Run Motorsport	4	Technical	22	
Ret	13	(Hong Kong) Kenneth Ma	Ford Focus ST	(Hong Kong) FRD HK Racing	2	Technical	20	
DNS	44	(Hong Kong) Mak Hing Tak	Opel Astra OPC	(Spain) Campos Racing		Accident	21	

Notes:

- ^3 — Rafaël Galiana and Kenneth Lau were given a 10-second penalty for jumping the start.
- ^4 — George Chou and Filipe de Souza were moved to the back of the grid because of a parc fermé infringement.

== Standings after the event ==
Drivers' Championship standings

	Pos	Driver	Points
1	1	(Switzerland) Stefano Comini	264
1	2	(Spain) Pepe Oriola	253
	3	(Spain) Jordi Gené	234
	4	(Italy) Gianni Morbidelli	217
1	5	(United States) Kevin Gleason	201

Teams' Championship standings

	Pos	Driver	Points
1	1	(United Kingdom) Team Craft-Bamboo Lukoil	535
1	2	(Italy) Target Competition	533
	3	(Sweden) WestCoast Racing	464
	4	(Germany) Liqui Moly Team Engstler	262
	5	(Spain) Campos Racing	43

- Note: Only the top five positions are included for both sets of drivers' standings.
