= 2012 Lamborghini Super Trofeo =

Seasons
- ← 2011 2013 →

The 2012 Lamborghini Blanpain Super Trofeo season was the fourth season of the Lamborghini Super Trofeo. The season started on 14 April at Monza and ended in October at Navarra. The season featured six double-header rounds, with each race lasting for a duration of 50 minutes.

== Super Trofeo Europe ==
=== Calendar ===
| Rnd | Circuit | Date |
|---|---|---|
| 1 | Autodromo Nazionale Monza, Monza, Italy | 15 April |
| 2 | (United Kingdom) Silverstone Circuit, Silverstone, Great Britain | 3 June |
| 3 | Circuit Paul Ricard, Le Castellet, France | 1 July |
| 4 | Circuit de Spa-Francorchamps, Belgium | 29 July |
| 5 | Nürburgring, Nürburg, Germany | 23 September |
| 6 | Circuito de Navarra, Los Arcos, Spain | 14 October |

=== Entries ===
| Team | No. | Drivers | Rounds |
|---|---|---|---|
| (Italy) Automobili Lamborghini | 1 | (Italy) Mario Fasanetto | 1, 3, 5–6 |
| (Italy) Automobili Lamborghini | 1 | (United Kingdom) Tiff Needell | 1 |
| (Italy) Automobili Lamborghini | 1 | (Italy) Alberto Sabbatini | 2 |
| (Italy) Automobili Lamborghini | 1 | (United Kingdom) Adrian Newey | 2 |
| (Italy) Automobili Lamborghini | 1 | (France) David Hallyday | 3 |
| (Italy) Automobili Lamborghini | 1 | (Belgium) Jean-Michel Martin | 4 |
| (Italy) Automobili Lamborghini | 1 | (Italy) Giorgio Sanna | 4 |
| (Italy) Automobili Lamborghini | 1 | (Germany) Jens Dralle | 5 |
| (Italy) Automobili Lamborghini | 1 | (Italy) Paolo Necchi | 6 |
| (Switzerland) G2 Racing | 2 | (Germany) Andreas Segler | 1 |
| (Switzerland) G2 Racing | 2 | (Germany) Stefan Venema | 1 |
| (Switzerland) G2 Racing | 2 | (Germany) Louis Wagner | 4 |
| (Switzerland) G2 Racing | 2 | (Germany) Oliver Mayer | 4 |
| Lamborghini Dehler Team Germany | 2 | (Germany) Louis Wagner | 5–6 |
| Lamborghini Dehler Team Germany | 5 | (Germany) Erwin Stueckle | 5–6 |
| (Italy) Bonaldi Motorsport | 3 | (Italy) Stefano Comini | 1 |
| (Italy) Bonaldi Motorsport | 3 | (South Africa) Adrian Zaugg | 2, 4–6 |
| (Italy) Bonaldi Motorsport | 3 | (Czech Republic) Zdenko Baran | 2 |
| (Italy) Bonaldi Motorsport | 11 | (Italy) Andrea Antonio Mamé | All |
| (Italy) Bonaldi Motorsport | 11 | (Italy) Mirko Zanardini | All |
| (Italy) Bonaldi Motorsport | 23 | (Italy) Davide Stancheris | 1 |
| (Italy) Bonaldi Motorsport | 80 | (Italy) Leonardo Gorini | 5 |
| (Italy) Bonaldi Motorsport | 80 | (Egypt) Raed Cherawi | 5 |
| (United Kingdom) Automobili Lamborghini Racing Team UK | 4 | (United Kingdom) Henry Fletcher | 2 |
| (United Kingdom) Automobili Lamborghini Racing Team UK | 4 | (United Kingdom) Jake Rattenbury | 2 |
| (United Kingdom) Automobili Lamborghini Racing Team UK | 4 | (United Kingdom) Mike Edmonds | 4–6 |
| (United Kingdom) Automobili Lamborghini Racing Team UK | 4 | (United Kingdom) Nima Khandan-Nia | 4 |
| (United Kingdom) Automobili Lamborghini Racing Team UK | 4 | (United Kingdom) Duncan Cameron | 5 |
| (Italy) Autovitesse Garage R. Affolter | 12 | (France) Jerome Lhoste | 1, 3–5 |
| (Italy) Autovitesse Garage R. Affolter | 12 | (France) Philippe Barou | 3–5 |
| (Italy) Autovitesse Garage R. Affolter | 19 | (Switzerland) Laurent Jenny | 1–2, 4–6 |
| (Italy) Autovitesse Garage R. Affolter | 19 | (Switzerland) Herve Leimer | All |
| (Italy) Autovitesse Garage R. Affolter | 19 | (France) Michel Mhitarian | 3 |
| (Italy) Autovitesse Garage R. Affolter | 63 | (Switzerland) Cedric Leimer | All |
| (Italy) Autovitesse Garage R. Affolter | 63 | (France) Julien Piquet | 5–6 |
| (Italy) Autovitesse Garage R. Affolter | 67 | (Switzerland) Laurent Jenny | 3 |
| (Italy) Autocarrozzeria Imperiale SRL | 20 | (Italy) Nicola Piancastelli | 1–2, 5–6 |
| (Italy) Autocarrozzeria Imperiale SRL | 20 | (Italy) Roberto Seveso | 1 |
| (Italy) Autocarrozzeria Imperiale SRL | 20 | (Italy) Leonardo Geraci | 3–4 |
| (Italy) Autocarrozzeria Imperiale SRL | 20 | (Italy) Davide Durante | 5–6 |
| (Italy) Autocarrozzeria Imperiale SRL | 22 | (Italy) Alberto Cola | 1–5 |
| (Italy) Autocarrozzeria Imperiale SRL | 22 | (Italy) Matteo Zucchi | All |
| (Italy) Autocarrozzeria Imperiale SRL | 54 | (Italy) Gianluca Carboni | 1 |
| (Italy) Autocarrozzeria Imperiale SRL | 54 | (Italy) Andrea Amici | 2–6 |
| (Italy) Autocarrozzeria Imperiale SRL | 58 | (Italy) Piergiorgio Capra | 4 |
| (Italy) Autocarrozzeria Imperiale SRL | 58 | (United Kingdom) Lee Cunningham | 4 |
| (Italy) Autocarrozzeria Imperiale SRL | 72 | (Italy) Roberto Tanca | 5–6 |
| (Czech Republic) Heico Gravity-Charouz Team | 55 | (Czech Republic) Andrej Barčák | 2–6 |
| (Czech Republic) Heico Gravity-Charouz Team | 55 | (Czech Republic) Patrik Hes | 2–4 |
| (Czech Republic) Heico Gravity-Charouz Team | 55 | (Czech Republic) Robert Hordossy | 5–6 |
| (Czech Republic) Heico Gravity-Charouz Team | 66 | (Czech Republic) Jan Urban | All |
| (Czech Republic) Heico Gravity-Charouz Team | 66 | (Czech Republic) Richard Chlad | 2 |
| (Czech Republic) Heico Gravity-Charouz Team | 66 | (Czech Republic) Milan Urban | 3–4, 6 |
| (Czech Republic) Heico Gravity-Charouz Team | 77 | (Czech Republic) Jakub Knoll | All |
| (Czech Republic) Heico Gravity-Charouz Team | 77 | (Czech Republic) Richard Chlad, Jr. | 4 |
| (Czech Republic) Heico Gravity-Charouz Team | 88 | (Czech Republic) Petr Charouz | All |
| (Czech Republic) Heico Gravity-Charouz Team | 88 | (Greece) Aristoteles Varvaroussis | All |
| (Czech Republic) Heico Gravity-Charouz Team | 99 | (Czech Republic) Jan Šťovíček | 1 |
| (Czech Republic) Heico Gravity-Charouz Team | 99 | (Czech Republic) Zdenko Baran | 1, 4 |
| (Czech Republic) Heico Gravity-Charouz Team | 99 | (Czech Republic) Josef Záruba | 2 |
| (Czech Republic) Heico Gravity-Charouz Team | 99 | (Czech Republic) Bronislav Formánek | 2 |
| (Czech Republic) Heico Gravity-Charouz Team | 99 | (Czech Republic) Patrick Louis | 3 |
| (Czech Republic) Heico Gravity-Charouz Team | 99 | (Czech Republic) Tomas Kral | 3 |
| (Czech Republic) Heico Gravity-Charouz Team | 99 | (Czech Republic) Jiri Perina | 5–6 |
| (Italy) Touring Auto 2000 SRL | 69 | (France) Dimitri Enjalbert | All |
| (Italy) Touring Auto 2000 SRL | 69 | (Belgium) Bernard Delhez | All |

=== Results summary ===
| Round | Circuit | Date | Pole position | Fastest lap | Winning drivers |
|---|---|---|---|---|---|
| 1 | (Italy) Autodromo Nazionale Monza | 14 April | (Italy) Stefano Comini | (Italy) Stefano Comini | (Italy) Stefano Comini |
| 2 | (Italy) Autodromo Nazionale Monza | 15 April | | (Italy) Stefano Comini | (Italy) Stefano Comini |
| 3 | (United Kingdom) Silverstone Circuit | 3 June | (France) Dimitri Enjalbert (Belgium) Bernard Delhez | (France) Dimitri Enjalbert (Belgium) Bernard Delhez | (Switzerland) Cedric Leimer |
| 4 | (United Kingdom) Silverstone Circuit | 3 June | | (France) Dimitri Enjalbert (Belgium) Bernard Delhez | (Italy) Andrea Amici |
| 5 | (France) Circuit Paul Ricard | 1 July | (South Africa) Adrian Zaugg | | (Italy) Andrea Amici |
| 6 | (France) Circuit Paul Ricard | 1 July | | | (Italy) Andrea Amici |
| 7 | (Belgium) Circuit de Spa-Francorchamps | 29 July | (France) Dimitri Enjalbert (Belgium) Bernard Delhez | (South Africa) Adrian Zaugg | (France) Dimitri Enjalbert (Belgium) Bernard Delhez |
| 8 | (Belgium) Circuit de Spa-Francorchamps | 29 July | | (South Africa) Adrian Zaugg | (Italy) Andrea Amici |
| 9 | (Germany) Nürburgring | 23 September | (South Africa) Adrian Zaugg | (South Africa) Adrian Zaugg | (France) Dimitri Enjalbert (Belgium) Bernard Delhez |
| 10 | (Germany) Nürburgring | 23 September | | (Italy) Andrea Amici | (Switzerland) Cedric Leimer (France) Julien Piquet |
| 11 | (Spain) Circuito de Navarra | 14 October | (South Africa) Adrian Zaugg | (Switzerland) Cedric Leimer (France) Julien Piquet | (South Africa) Adrian Zaugg |
| 12 | (Spain) Circuito de Navarra | 14 October | | (Switzerland) Cedric Leimer (France) Julien Piquet | (Italy) Andrea Amici |

== Super Trofeo Asia ==
=== Calendar ===
| Rnd | Circuit | Date |
|---|---|---|
| 1 | Sepang International Circuit, Selangor, Malaysia | 26–27 May |
| 2 | Fuji Speedway, Oyama, Japan | 14–15 July |
| 3 | Ordos International Circuit, Ordos City, China | 18–19 August |
| 4 | Guangdong International Circuit, Guangdong, China | 15–16 September |
| 5 | Shanghai International Circuit, Shanghai, China | 26–28 October |
| 6 | Shanghai International Circuit, Shanghai, China | 10–11 November |

=== Entries ===
| Team | No. | Drivers | Class | Rounds |
|---|---|---|---|---|
| (Canada) Atlantic Racing Team | 1 | (China) Lu | | 1 |
| (Canada) Atlantic Racing Team | 1 | Wong | Am | 5 |
| (Canada) Atlantic Racing Team | 1 | Hui | Am | 5 |
| (Canada) Atlantic Racing Team | 9 | (Malaysia) Rizal Ramli | | 1–2, 5 |
| (Canada) Atlantic Racing Team | 12 | (Japan) Motoaki Ishikawa | Am | 1–2 |
| (Canada) Atlantic Racing Team | 12 | (Japan) Nobuteru Taniguchi | Am | 3 |
| (Canada) Atlantic Racing Team | 12 | Lo | Am | 5 |
| (Canada) Atlantic Racing Team | 12 | Tong | Am | 5 |
| (Canada) Atlantic Racing Team | 99 | (Singapore) Ro Charlz Skyangel | | 1–2, 5 |
| (Philippines) Eurasia Motorsport | 2 | (China) David Cheng | Am | 1–3, 5 |
| (Philippines) Eurasia Motorsport | 2 | (Hong Kong) William Lok | Am | 1–3, 5 |
| (Philippines) Eurasia Motorsport | 3 | (China) Chen Ke Kan | Am | 1–3, 5 |
| (Philippines) Eurasia Motorsport | 3 | Yuan | Am | 2 |
| (Hong Kong) KCMG | 6 | (Chinese Taipei) George Chou | Am | 1 |
| (Hong Kong) KCMG | 6 | (Chinese Taipei) Max Chen | Am | 1 |
| (Hong Kong) KCMG | 6 | (Italy) Andrea Garbagnati | Am | 2, 5 |
| (Hong Kong) KCMG | 6 | (Indonesia) Bob Irawan Indrasasana | Am | 2, 5 |
| (Hong Kong) KCMG | 24 | Wong | | 1 |
| (Hong Kong) KCMG | 24 | Hui | | 1 |
| (Hong Kong) KCMG | 24 | (Chinese Taipei) George Chou | Am | 2–3, 5 |
| (Hong Kong) KCMG | 24 | (Chinese Taipei) Max Chen | Am | 2 |
| (Hong Kong) KCMG | 24 | Yoshihiro | Am | 5 |
| (Republic of Ireland) Aran Racing | 7 | Xu | Am | 2–3 |
| (Republic of Ireland) Aran Racing | 7 | Zhang | Am | 2–3 |
| (Republic of Ireland) Aran Racing | 7 | Kai | Am | 1, 5 |
| (Republic of Ireland) Aran Racing | 7 | Dong | Am | 1, 5 |
| (Republic of Ireland) Aran Racing | 22 | Ida | | 2 |
| (Republic of Ireland) Aran Racing | 22 | Hashimoto | | 2 |
| (Republic of Ireland) Aran Racing | 22 | Kuan | Am | 3 |
| (Republic of Ireland) Aran Racing | 22 | Liu | Am | 3 |
| (Republic of Ireland) Aran Racing | 22 | Tu | Am | 5 |
| (Republic of Ireland) Aran Racing | 22 | Chen | Am | 5 |
| (Macau) Star River Windsor Arch | 8 | Benny | Am | 2 |
| (Macau) Star River Windsor Arch | 8 | Paul | Am | 2 |
| (Macau) Star River Windsor Arch | 8 | (Hong Kong) Michael Choi | | 3 |
| (Macau) Star River Windsor Arch | 8 | Yu | | 5 |
| (Macau) Star River Windsor Arch | 8 | (Chinese Taipei) Steven Chian | | 5 |
| (Macau) Star River Windsor Arch | 88 | (Hong Kong) Keith Chan | Am | 1–3, 5 |
| (Macau) Star River Windsor Arch | 88 | (Macau) Kevin Tse | Am | 1–3, 5 |
| (Japan) Lamborghini Azabu | 10 | (Japan) Shigeru Terashima | Am | 1–2 |
| (Japan) Lamborghini Azabu | 10 | (Japan) Hideto Yasuoka | Am | 1–2 |
| (Japan) Lamborghini Azabu | 10 | (Japan) Suzuki | | 3 |
| (Japan) Lamborghini Azabu | 10 | (Japan) Tadao Uematsu | Am | 4 |
| (China) TS | 11 | (China) Zhu Jun Han | Am | 2 |
| (China) TS | 11 | (Malaysia) Eric Yeo Tee Eong | Am | 5 |
| | 16 | Yuan | Am | 3 |
| | 16 | Bao | Am | 3 |
| (Chinese Taipei) Gama Racing | 36 | (Chinese Taipei) Jeff Lu | Am | 1–3 |
| (Chinese Taipei) Gama Racing | 36 | (China) Hanss Lin | Am | 5 |
| (Chinese Taipei) Gama Racing | 38 | (China) Hanss Lin | Am | 1–2 |
| (Chinese Taipei) Gama Racing | 38 | Alex | Am | 2 |
| (Chinese Taipei) Gama Racing | 38 | Chao | Am | 1, 3, 5 |
| (Chinese Taipei) Gama Racing | 38 | (Chinese Taipei) Jeff Lu | Am | 5 |
| (China) BBT | 37 | (China) Anthony Liu | | 1–3, 5 |
| (China) BBT | 37 | (Italy) Davide Rizzo | | 1–3, 5 |
| (China) BBT | 66 | (China) Ting Zheng | | 1–3, 5 |
| (China) BBT | 66 | (Italy) Massimiliano Wiser | | 1–3, 5 |

| Icon | Class |
|---|---|
| P | Pro Cup |
| Am | Am Cup |
| | Guest Starter |

=== Results summary ===
| Round | | Circuit | Pole position | Pro-Am Winners | Am Winners |
|---|---|---|---|---|---|
| 1 | R1 | (Malaysia) Sepang International Circuit | (China) No. 37 BBT | (China) No. 37 BBT | (Japan) No. 10 Lamborghini Azabu |
| 1 | R1 | (Malaysia) Sepang International Circuit | (China) Anthony Liu (Italy) Davide Rizzo | (China) Anthony Liu (Italy) Davide Rizzo | (Japan) Shigeru Terashima (Japan) Hideto Yasuoka |
| 1 | R2 | (Malaysia) Sepang International Circuit | (China) No. 37 BBT | (China) No. 37 BBT | (Macau) No. 88 Star River Windsor Arch |
| 1 | R2 | (Malaysia) Sepang International Circuit | (China) Anthony Liu (Italy) Davide Rizzo | (China) Anthony Liu (Italy) Davide Rizzo | (Hong Kong) Keith Chan (Macau) Kevin Tse |
| 2 | R1 | (Japan) Fuji Speedway | (China) No. 37 BBT | (China) No. 37 BBT | (Japan) No. 10 Lamborghini Azabu |
| 2 | R1 | (Japan) Fuji Speedway | (China) Anthony Liu (Italy) Davide Rizzo | (China) Anthony Liu (Italy) Davide Rizzo | (Japan) Shigeru Terashima (Japan) Hideto Yasuoka |
| 2 | R2 | (Japan) Fuji Speedway | (China) No. 37 BBT | (China) No. 37 BBT | (Canada) No. 12 Atlantic Racing Team |
| 2 | R2 | (Japan) Fuji Speedway | (China) Anthony Liu (Italy) Davide Rizzo | (China) Anthony Liu (Italy) Davide Rizzo | (Japan) Motoaki Ishikawa |
| 3 | R1 | (China) Ordos International Circuit | (Canada) No. 99 Atlantic Racing Team | (Canada) No. 9 Atlantic Racing Team | |
| 3 | R1 | (China) Ordos International Circuit | (Singapore) Ro Charlz Skyangel | (Malaysia) Rizal Ramli | |
| 3 | R2 | (China) Ordos International Circuit | (China) No. 37 BBT | (Canada) No. 9 Atlantic Racing Team | (Macau) No. 88 Star River Windsor Arch |
| 3 | R2 | (China) Ordos International Circuit | (China) Anthony Liu (Italy) Davide Rizzo | (Malaysia) Rizal Ramli | (Hong Kong) Keith Chan (Macau) Kevin Tse |
| 4 | R1 | (China) Guangdong International Circuit | (Canada) No. 99 Atlantic Racing Team | (Canada) No. 99 Atlantic Racing Team | (Philippines) No. 2 Eurasia Motorsport |
| 4 | R1 | (China) Guangdong International Circuit | (Singapore) Ro Charlz Skyange | (Singapore) Ro Charlz Skyangel | (Hong Kong) William Lok |
| 4 | R2 | (China) Guangdong International Circuit | (China) No. 37 BBT | (Canada) No. 9 Atlantic Racing Team | (Japan) No. 10 Lamborghini Azabu |
| 4 | R2 | (China) Guangdong International Circuit | (China) Anthony Liu (Italy) Davide Rizzo | (Malaysia) Rizal Ramli | (Japan) Tadao Uematsu |
| 5 | R1 | (China) Shanghai International Circuit | (China) No. 37 BBT | (Canada) No. 99 Atlantic Racing Team | (Macau) No. 88 Star River Windsor Arch |
| 5 | R1 | (China) Shanghai International Circuit | (China) Anthony Liu (Italy) Davide Rizzo | (Singapore) Ro Charlz Skyangel | (Hong Kong) Keith Chan (Macau) Kevin Tse |
| 5 | R2 | (China) Shanghai International Circuit | (Canada) No. 99 Atlantic Racing Team | (Canada) No. 9 Atlantic Racing Team | (Philippines) No. 3 Eurasia Motorsport |
| 5 | R2 | (China) Shanghai International Circuit | (Singapore) Ro Charlz Skyangel | (Malaysia) Rizal Ramli | (China) Chen Ke Kan |
| 6 | R1 | (China) Shanghai International Circuit | | | |
| 6 | R2 | (China) Shanghai International Circuit | | | |
