= Keith Chan =

Keith Chan may refer to:

- Keith Chan Fai-young (born 1970), composer
- Keith Chan Siu-kei, composer
- Keith Chan (racing driver) (born 1977), Hong Kong racing driver
