= Sam Lok =

Hong Kong racing driver

- Nationality: Hongkonger
- Born: 3 January 1967 (age 59) Hong Kong

TCR Asia Series career
- Debut season: 2015
- Current team: Asia Racing Team
- Car number: 36
- Starts: 0

Previous series
- 2015 2014 2014 2013, 15: Audi R8 LMS Cup; Ferrari Challenge Asia Pacific; Volkswagen Scirocco R-Cup China; Lamborghini Super Trofeo Asia

"Sam" Lok Chi Kit (born 3 January 1967) is a Hong Kong racing driver currently competing in the TCR Asia Series. Having previously competed in the Lamborghini Super Trofeo Asia, Ferrari Challenge Asia Pacific and Audi R8 LMS Cup amongst others.

== Racing career ==
Lok began his career in 2013 in the Lamborghini Super Trofeo Asia series. He also raced in the series in 2015, finishing fourth in the Am class standings. He raced in the Volkswagen Scirocco R-Cup China and Ferrari Challenge Asia Pacific in 2014. In 2015, he raced in the Audi R8 LMS Cup, finishing eighth in the Am class standings.

In November 2015, it was announced that Lok would race in the TCR Asia Series & TCR International Series, driving a SEAT León Cup Racer for Asia Racing Team. However, he failed to qualify for the event and therefore didn't take part in any of the two races.

== Racing record ==
=== Complete TCR International Series results ===
(key) (Races in bold indicate pole position) (Races in italics indicate fastest lap)

Year	Team	Car	1	2	3	4	5	6	7	8	9	10	11	12	13	14	15	16	17	18	19	20	21	22	DC	Points
2015	Asia Racing Team	SEAT León Cup Racer	MYS; 1	MYS; 2	CHN; 1	CHN; 2	ESP; 1	ESP; 2	POR; 1	POR; 2	ITA; 1	ITA; 2	AUT; 1	AUT; 2	RUS; 1	RUS; 2	RBR; 1	RBR; 2	SIN; 1	SIN; 2	THA; 1	THA; 2	MAC; 1 DNQ	MAC; 2 DNQ	NC	0
