= Munkong Sathienthirakul =

Thai racing driver (born 1985)

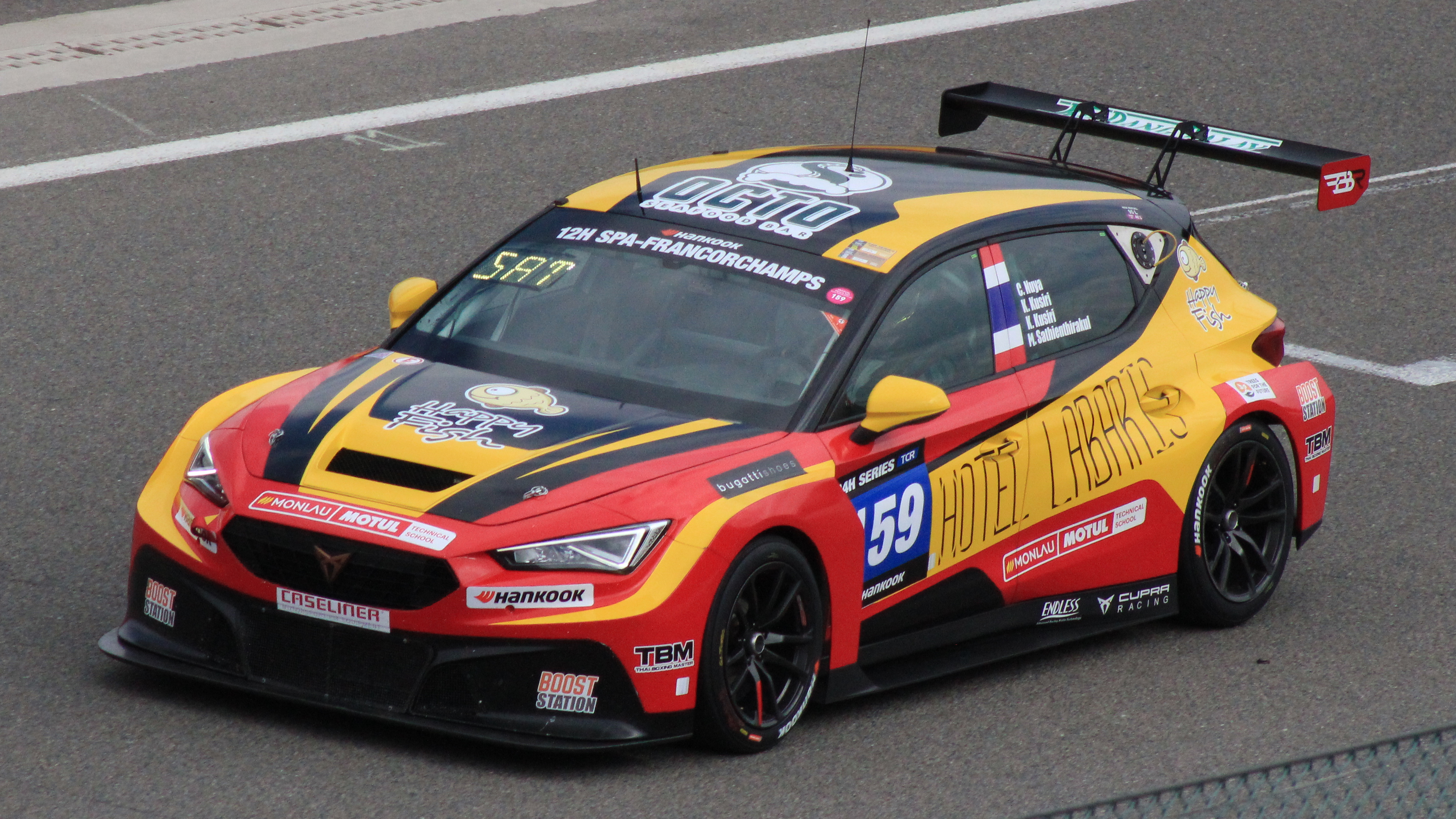
- Nationality: Thai
- Born: 6 October 1985 (age 41) Bangkok, Thailand

TCR Asia Series career
- Debut season: 2015
- Current team: Craft-Bamboo Racing
- Car number: 80
- Starts: 2
- Wins: 1
- Poles: 1
- Fastest laps: 2

Previous series
- 2014-15 2011 2010 2000-03: Thailand Super Series; Thai Honda Civic Cup; Thai Touring Car Championship; Karting

Championship titles
- 2000-02: Karting

Munkong "Turbo" Sathienthirakul (born 6 October 1985) is a Thai racing driver currently competing in the TCR Asia Series. Having previously competed in the Thailand Super Series and Thai Touring Car Championship amongst others.

== Racing career ==
Sathienthirakul began his career in 2000 in karting, he won three titles in karting up until 2002. In 2010, he switched to the Thai Touring Car Championship. He raced in the Thai Honda Civic Cup in 2011, before switching to the Thailand Super Series, he finished the 2014 season second in the championship standings.

In October 2015, it was announced that Sathienthirakul would race in the TCR Asia Series & TCR International Series, driving a SEAT León Cup Racer for Craft-Bamboo Racing.

== Racing record ==
=== Complete TCR International Series results ===
(key) (Races in bold indicate pole position) (Races in italics indicate fastest lap)

Year	Team	Car	1	2	3	4	5	6	7	8	9	10	11	12	13	14	15	16	17	18	19	20	21	22	DC	Points
2015	Craft-Bamboo Racing	SEAT León Cup Racer	SEP; 1	SEP; 2	SHA; 1	SHA; 2	VAL; 1	VAL; 2	ALG; 1	ALG; 2	MNZ; 1	MNZ; 2	SAL; 1	SAL; 2	SOC; 1	SOC; 2	RBR; 1	RBR; 2	MRN; 1	MRN; 2	CHA; 1; 11	CHA; 2; 9	MAC; 1	MAC; 2	38th	2
2016	Liqui Moly Team Engstler	Volkswagen Golf GTI TCR	BHR; 1	BHR; 2	EST; 1	EST; 2	SPA; 1	SPA; 2	IMO; 1	IMO; 2	SAL; 1	SAL; 2	OSC; 1	OSC; 2	SOC; 1	SOC; 2	CHA; 1; 12	CHA; 2 Ret	MRN; 1	MRN; 2	SEP; 1	SEP; 2	MAC; 1	MAC; 2	NC	0
2017	DG Sport Compétition	Opel Astra TCR	RIM; 1	RIM; 2	BHR; 1	BHR; 2	SPA; 1	SPA; 2	MNZ; 1	MNZ; 2	SAL; 1	SAL; 2	HUN; 1	HUN; 2	OSC; 1	OSC; 2	CHA; 1; 14	CHA; 2; 12	ZHE; 1	ZHE; 2	DUB; 1	DUB; 2			NC	0

=== Complete TCR Europe Series results ===
(key) (Races in bold indicate pole position) (Races in italics indicate fastest lap)

Year	Team	Car	1	2	3	4	5	6	7	8	9	10	11	12	13	14	DC	Points
2018	Monlau Competición	CUPRA León TCR	LEC; 1	LEC; 2	ZAN; 1	ZAN; 2	SPA; 1; 12	SPA; 2; 15	HUN; 1	HUN; 2	ASS; 1; 20†	ASS; 2; 15	MNZ; 1	MNZ; 2	CAT; 1; 18	CAT; 2 Ret	33rd	0

^{†} Driver did not finish, but was classified as he completed over 75% of the race distance.
