= Mak Hing Tak =

Hong Kong racing driver

- Nationality: Hongkonger
- Born: 28 October 1959 (age 67) Hong Kong

TCR International Series career
- Debut season: 2015
- Current team: Campos Racing
- Car number: 44
- Starts: 0

Previous series
- 2012 2009-12, 14: Audi R8 LMS Cup; Porsche Carrera Cup Asia

Mak Hing Tak (born 28 October 1959) is a Hong Kong racing driver currently competing in the TCR International Series. Having previously competed in the Audi R8 LMS Cup and Porsche Carrera Cup Asia amongst others.

== Racing career ==
Mak began his career in 2009 in Porsche Carrera Cup Asia, he raced there up until 2014. In 2012, he also raced in the Audi R8 LMS Cup. He came second in class in the 2011 6 Hours of Zhuhai, driving an Audi R8 LMS.

In September 2015, it was announced that Mak would race in the TCR Asia Series & TCR International Series, driving an Opel Astra OPC for Campos Racing. However, he crashed on the warming up lap for race 1 and therefore didn't start any of the two races.

== Racing record ==
=== Complete TCR International Series results ===
(key) (Races in bold indicate pole position) (Races in italics indicate fastest lap)

Year	Team	Car	1	2	3	4	5	6	7	8	9	10	11	12	13	14	15	16	17	18	19	20	21	22	DC	Points
2015	Campos Racing	Opel Astra OPC	MYS; 1	MYS; 2	CHN; 1	CHN; 2	ESP; 1	ESP; 2	POR; 1	POR; 2	ITA; 1	ITA; 2	AUT; 1	AUT; 2	RUS; 1	RUS; 2	RBR; 1	RBR; 2	SIN; 1 DNS	SIN; 2 DNS	THA; 1	THA; 2	MAC; 1	MAC; 2	NC	0
