= Robb Holland =

American racing driver (born 1967)

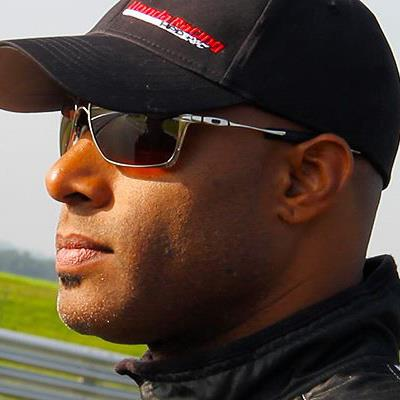
- Holland in 2012
- Nationality: (United States) American
- Born: November 18, 1967 (age 58) Denver, Colorado, U.S.

British Touring Car Championship career
- Debut season: 2012
- Current team: Handy Motorsport
- Categorisation: FIA Bronze
- Car number: 67
- Former teams: Rotek Racing, RCIB Insurance Racing
- Starts: 38
- Wins: 0
- Poles: 0
- Fastest laps: 0
- Best finish: 26th in 2012, 2015

Previous series
- 2012 2005-12: WTCC; SCCA World Challenge

Robb Holland (born November 18, 1967, in Denver, Colorado) is an American racing driver who has competed in several international racing series. Most notably the British Touring Car Championship where in 2014, Holland became the first American driver in history to compete full-time in the series driving Rotek Racing's Audi S3. Holland is also the first American ever to compete in the World Touring Car Championship when he drove for Bamboo Engineering in the 2012 FIA WTCC Race of the United States at Sonoma Raceway, California.

Holland got his professional start in the Pirelli World Challenge series driving a Dodge SRT4 Touring Car for the factory supported 3R Racing team. Holland was to get Dodge's first podium finish at Road America and finish runner up in the Rookie of the Year Competition. He was to finish 3rd overall in the championships in 2011, driving for the factory Volvo team run by K-PAX Racing.

In 2016, Holland competing in his first Pikes Peak Hillclimb, smashed the existing Front Wheel Drive record by nearly a minute.

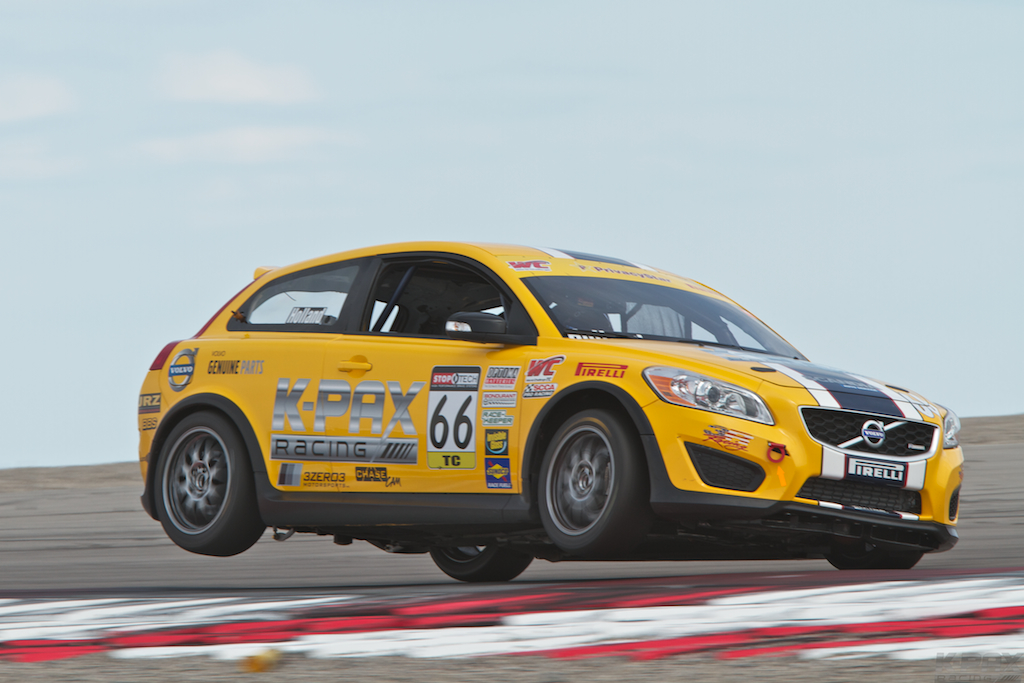
Volvo catching air at MMP

== Racing career ==
2011

Holland was signed by K-PAX Racing to drive and develop the factory Volvo C30 touring car in the Pirelli World Challenge. After a rushed start to the season Holland was to finish the year with 3 podiums including a win and lap record at Mid Ohio. Holland was to finish 3rd overall in the Championship.

=== 2012 ===
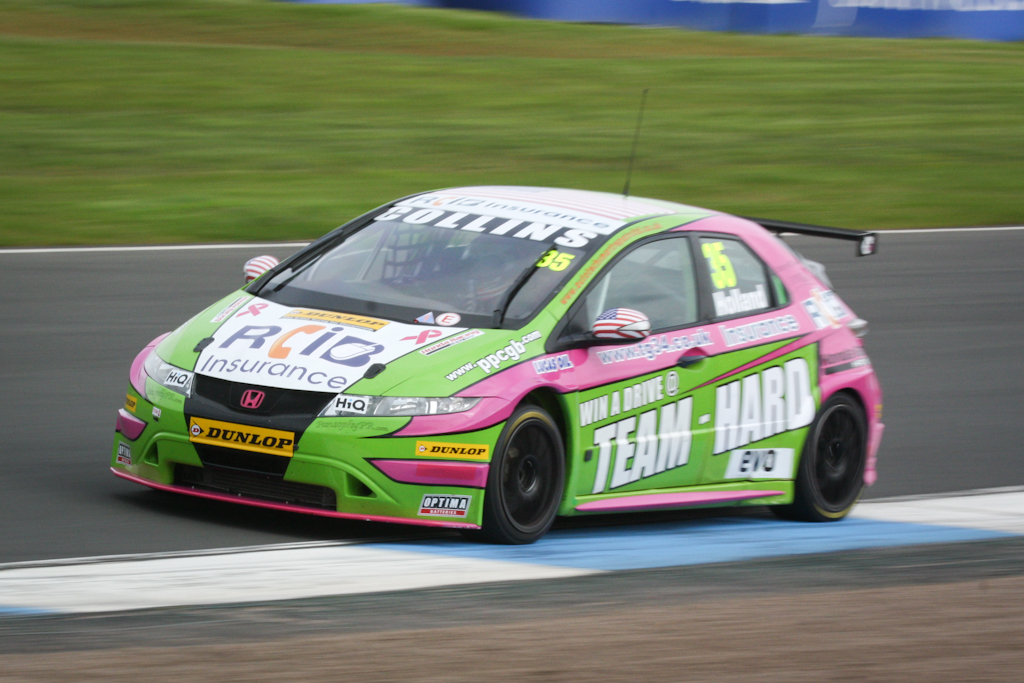
Holland competing at Knockhill

Holland made his British Touring Car Championship debut at the Snetterton round of the 2012 season driving in place of Tony Gilham in the Team HARD. Honda Civic. He was the first driver from the US to compete in the BTCC since Bill Gubelmann in 1975. He failed to finish his first race when he collided with the Speedworks Motorsport Toyota Avensis of Adam Morgan, he went on to finish in the points in the second race with a fourteenth-place finish. Holland also competed in the following meeting at Knockhill scoring points in the second and third races.

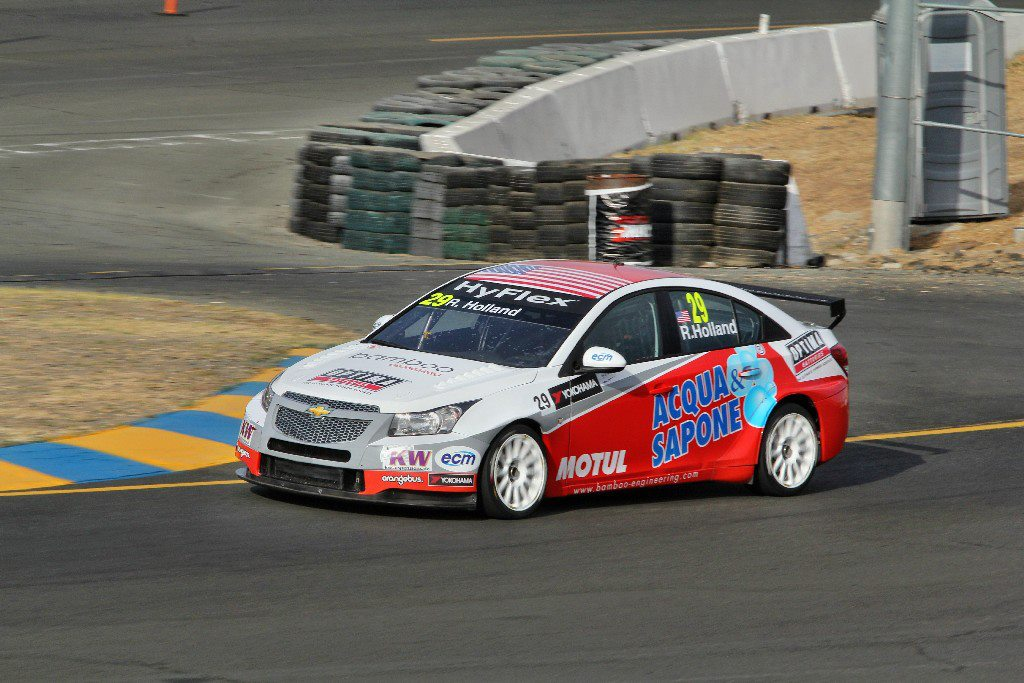
Holland competing in a Chevrolet Cruze at the 2012 FIA WTCC Race of the United States.

At the last minute, Holland was called up by bamboo-engineering to drive their Chevrolet Cruze in the 2012 FIA WTCC Race of the United States in place of Pasquale di Sabatino. In the process, he became the first American driver ever to compete in the World Touring Car Championship. With only a few laps experience in the car, he qualified 21st but went on to finish strongly in both races with a best result of thirteenth overall and seventh in the independents category, in the first race of the weekend.

=== 2013 ===
In July 2013, it was announced that Holland had rejoined Tony Gilham Racing in the British Touring Car Championship, and would be driving an NGTC Vauxhall Insignia. Holland went on to score points in two out of the three rounds.

=== 2014 ===
In October 2013, at the final round of the 2013 BTCC season, Holland announced that he would be entering the BTCC full-time in an Audi S3 built and run by Rotek Racing. This would make Holland the first American in history to become a full-time entrant in the UK's most popular racing series. New to almost every circuit on the calendar Holland stated moderate goals of finishing in the points by the second half of the season. With the newly built S3 only completed a few days prior to the first round at Brands Hatch, Holland struggled to break into the top-20, with a best finish of 20th in the third race. The next round at Donington would prove to be a major set back for Holland who was collected by James Cole in the Toyota Avensis, as Cole swerved to avoid a spinning Rob Austin This incident left the Audi badly damaged and unable to be repaired in time for the following round at Thruxton. Coming back for the race at Oulton Park, Holland turned qualifying issues into a strong final race in monsoon-like conditions, where the American was able to move from the back row at the start into the top-12 by mid race. Contact from Dan Welch in the Proton cut down a rear tire on the Audi, ending Holland's run. Holland was able to get into the points at Snetterton where he battled former champions Fabrizio Giovanardi and Andrew Jordan for the final points-paying position. Holland was able to follow that result up with finishes in the top 20 at Knockhill, and scored further points at Rockingham before another incident with James Cole and Martin Depper at Silverstone ended Holland's season prematurely in 27th place overall.

=== 2015 ===
Late in the season, Holland was signed to fill in for Simon Belcher in the Toyota Avensis, after Belcher's Thruxton accident ruled him out of the next few races. Even though he stepped into the car mid season, Holland was able to bring the car home in 14th place at his first race weekend at Snetterton. Handy Motorsports best result in the BTCC at that time.

Holland was then to be a last minute call up by the Chinese FRD Racing team, to race the underdeveloped Ford Focus TCR car for the TRC International round in Buriram Thailand and then Road Star Racing's Seat Leon TCR car at Macau. Holland went on to finish sixth overall in the prestigious Guia Race of Macau and second in the TCR Asia division.

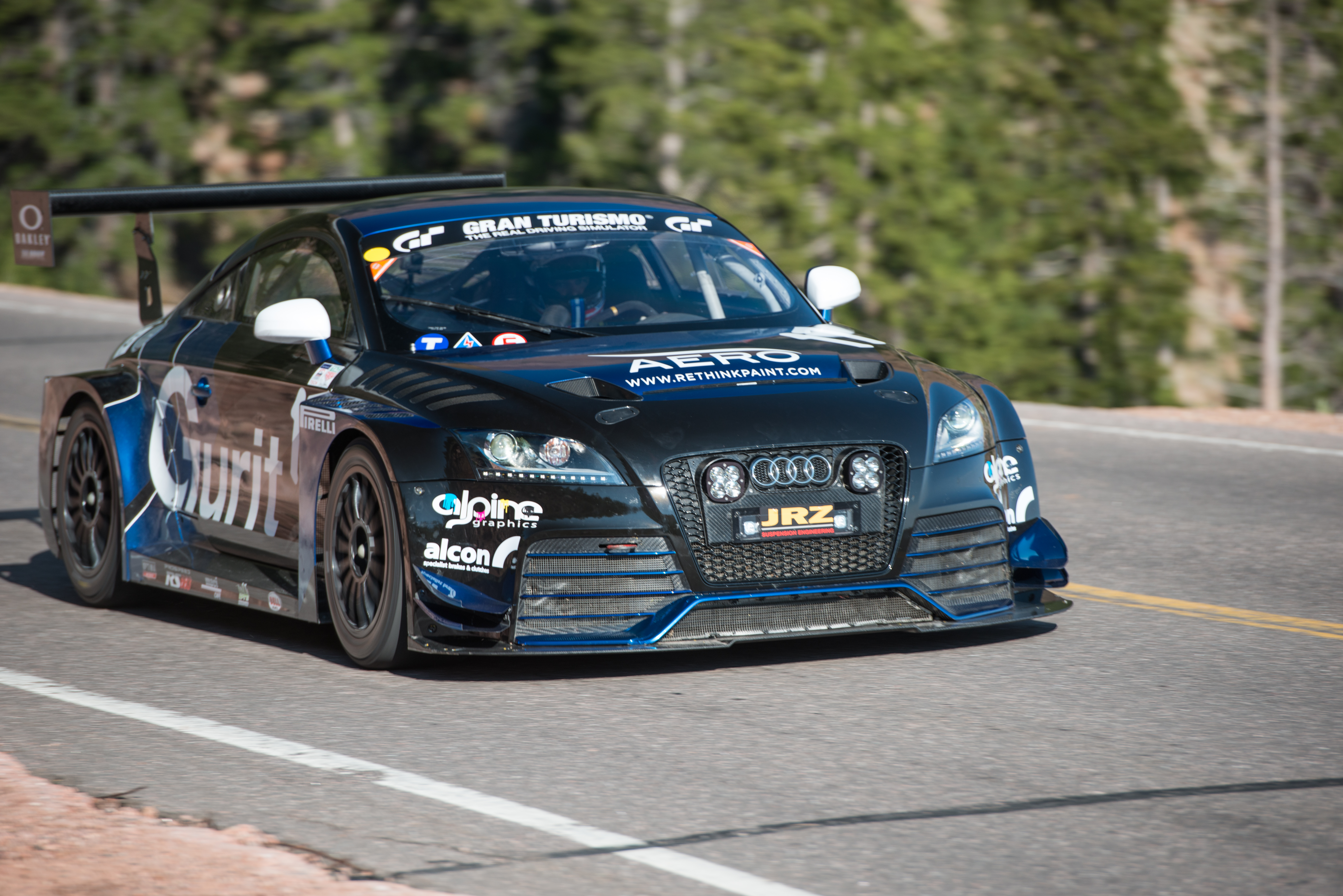
Robb Holland in the Rotek Racing TT RS

=== 2016 ===
Holland came back to the US with the goal of breaking the Front Wheel Drive record at the Pikes Peak Hillclimb. He was to be successful in his attempt by setting a time of 10:56.878, breaking the old record by over a minute.

=== 2017 ===
Holland returned to Pikes Peak, this time in an 850 hp salvage title Corvette, that the team built in 75 days. The car became the fastest Corvette in history to go up Pikes Peak.

== Racing record ==
=== Complete British Touring Car Championship results ===
(key) (Races in bold indicate pole position – 1 point awarded in first race) (Races in italics indicate fastest lap – 1 point awarded all races) (* signifies that driver lead race for at least one lap – 1 point given)

Year	Team	Car	1	2	3	4	5	6	7	8	9	10	11	12	13	14	15	16	17	18	19	20	21	22	23	24	25	26	27	28	29	30	DC	Points
2012	RCIB Insurance & HARD	Honda Civic	BRH; 1	BRH; 2	BRH; 3	DON; 1	DON; 2	DON; 3	THR; 1	THR; 2	THR; 3	OUL; 1	OUL; 2	OUL; 3	CRO; 1	CRO; 2	CRO; 3	SNE; 1 Ret	SNE; 2; 14	SNE; 3; 17	KNO; 1 Ret	KNO; 2; 14	KNO; 3; 14	ROC; 1	ROC; 2	ROC; 3	SIL; 1	SIL; 2	SIL; 3	BRH; 1	BRH; 2	BRH; 3	26th	6
2013	RCIB Insurance Racing	Vauxhall Insignia	BRH; 1	BRH; 2	BRH; 3	DON; 1	DON; 2	DON; 3	THR; 1	THR; 2	THR; 3	OUL; 1	OUL; 2	OUL; 3	CRO; 1	CRO; 2	CRO; 3	SNE; 1; 21	SNE; 2; 15	SNE; 3; 14	KNO; 1	KNO; 2	KNO; 3	ROC; 1	ROC; 2	ROC; 3	SIL; 1	SIL; 2	SIL; 3	BRH; 1	BRH; 2	BRH; 3	31st	3
2014	Rotek Racing	Audi S3 Saloon	BRH; 1; 23	BRH; 2; 22	BRH; 3; 20	DON; 1; 28	DON; 2 Ret	DON; 3 DNS	THR; 1	THR; 2	THR; 3	OUL; 1; 25	OUL; 2; 22	OUL; 3 Ret	CRO; 1; 28	CRO; 2; 20	CRO; 3 Ret	SNE; 1; 15	SNE; 2 Ret	SNE; 3 Ret	KNO; 1 Ret	KNO; 2; 21	KNO; 3; 18	ROC; 1; 21	ROC; 2; 19	ROC; 3; 15	SIL; 1; 24	SIL; 2; 25	SIL; 3 Ret	BRH; 1	BRH; 2	BRH; 3	27th	2
2015	Handy Motorsport	Toyota Avensis	BRH; 1	BRH; 2	BRH; 3	DON; 1	DON; 2	DON; 3	THR; 1	THR; 2	THR; 3	OUL; 1	OUL; 2	OUL; 3	CRO; 1	CRO; 2	CRO; 3	SNE; 1; 19	SNE; 2; 14	SNE; 3 Ret	KNO; 1; 19	KNO; 2; 16	KNO; 3; 19	ROC; 1; 17	ROC; 2; 22	ROC; 3 Ret	SIL; 1	SIL; 2	SIL; 3	BRH; 1	BRH; 2	BRH; 3	26th	2

=== Complete World Touring Car Championship results ===
(key) (Races in bold indicate pole position) (Races in italics indicate fastest lap)

Year	Team	Car	1	2	3	4	5	6	7	8	9	10	11	12	13	14	15	16	17	18	19	20	21	22	23	24	Pos	Pts
2012	bamboo-engineering	Chevrolet Cruze 1.6T	ITA; 1	ITA; 2	ESP; 1	ESP; 2	MAR; 1	MAR; 2	SVK; 1	SVK; 2	HUN; 1	HUN; 2	AUT; 1	AUT; 2	POR; 1	POR; 2	BRA; 1	BRA; 2	USA; 1; 13	USA; 2; 16	JPN; 1	JPN; 2	CHN; 1	CHN; 2	MAC; 1	MAC; 2	NC	0

=== Complete TCR International Series results ===
(key) (Races in bold indicate pole position) (Races in italics indicate fastest lap)

Year	Team	Car	1	2	3	4	5	6	7	8	9	10	11	12	13	14	15	16	17	18	19	20	21	22	DC	Points
2015	FRD HK Racing	Ford Focus ST	SEP; 1	SEP; 2	SHA; 1	SHA; 2	VAL; 1	VAL; 2	ALG; 1	ALG; 2	MNZ; 1	MNZ; 2	SAL; 1	SAL; 2	SOC; 1	SOC; 2	RBR; 1	RBR; 2	MRN; 1	MRN; 2	CHA; 1 Ret	CHA; 2 DSQ			26th	8
2015	Roadstar Racing	SEAT León Cup Racer																					MAC; 1; 14	MAC; 2; 6	26th	8
