= Keith Chan (racing driver) =

Hong Kong racing driver

- Nationality: Hongkonger
- Born: 22 September 1977 (age 49) Hong Kong

TCR Asia Series career
- Debut season: 2015
- Current team: Target Competition
- Car number: 98
- Starts: 2

Previous series
- 2014 2013, 15 2010 2010: Porsche Carrera Cup Asia; Lamborghini Super Trofeo Asia; Volkswagen Scirocco Cup China; GT Asia Series

Championship titles
- 2015: Lamborghini Super Trofeo Asia

Keith Chan Sze-chun (born 22 September 1977) is a Hong Kong racing driver currently competing in the TCR Asia Series. He has previously competed in the Porsche Carrera Cup Asia, Lamborghini Super Trofeo Asia and GT Asia Series amongst others.

== Racing career ==
Chan began his career in 2010 in GT Asia Series, he also raced in the Volkswagen Scirocco Cup China that year. Between 2011 and 2012, he only raced in the Macau GT Cup. He raced in the Lamborghini Super Trofeo Asia in 2013 and 2015, winning the championship in 2015. In 2014, he raced in the Porsche Carrera Cup Asia.

In November 2015, it was announced that Chan would race in the TCR Asia Series & TCR International Series, driving a SEAT León Cup Racer for Target Competition.

== Racing record ==
=== Complete TCR International Series results ===
(key) (Races in bold indicate pole position) (Races in italics indicate fastest lap)

Year	Team	Car	1	2	3	4	5	6	7	8	9	10	11	12	13	14	15	16	17	18	19	20	21	22	DC	Points
2015	Target Competition	SEAT León Cup Racer	MYS; 1	MYS; 2	CHN; 1	CHN; 2	ESP; 1	ESP; 2	POR; 1	POR; 2	ITA; 1	ITA; 2	AUT; 1	AUT; 2	RUS; 1	RUS; 2	RBR; 1	RBR; 2	SIN; 1	SIN; 2	THA; 1	THA; 2	MAC; 1; 18	MAC; 2; 7	29th	6
