= Frank Yu =

Hong Kong racing driver

- Nationality: Hongkonger
- Born: 25 May 1963 (age 63) British Hong Kong

GT Asia Series career
- Debut season: 2010
- Current team: Craft-Bamboo Racing
- Car number: 77
- Starts: 200+
- Wins: 50+
- Poles: 50+
- Best finish: 1st (Blanc Pain GTA GT Championship) in 2010
- Finished last season: Shanghai 8h October 2023 (1st)

Previous series
- 2015 2010-11 2008: TCR International Series; Clio Cup China Series; Asia GT Championship

Championship titles
- 2012 2012: Malaysian Super Series; Aston Martin Le Mans Festival

"Frank" Yu Siu Fung (born 25 May 1963) is a former Hong Kong racing driver who competed in the GT Asia Series. He formerly competed in the TCR International Series, making his debut in 2015.

== Racing career ==
Yu began his career in 2008 in the Asia GT Championship. In 2010, he switched to the Clio Cup China Series. In 2010, Yu made his GT Asia Series debut, ending third in the championship standings that year.

In March 2015, it was announced that Yu would race in the first ever TCR International Series round in Sepang, driving for Craft-Bamboo Racing.

== Racing record ==
=== Complete TCR International Series results ===
(key) (Races in bold indicate pole position) (Races in italics indicate fastest lap)

Year	Team	Car	1	2	3	4	5	6	7	8	9	10	11	12	13	14	15	16	17	18	19	20	21	22	DC	Points
2015	Craft-Bamboo Racing	SEAT León Cup Racer	MYS; 1; 11	MYS; 2; 9	CHN; 1	CHN; 2	ESP; 1	ESP; 2	POR; 1	POR; 2	ITA; 1	ITA; 2	AUT; 1	AUT; 2	RUS; 1	RUS; 2	RBR; 1	RBR; 2	SIN; 1; 16	SIN; 2; 15	THA; 1	THA; 2	MAC; 1 Ret	MAC; 2 DNS	37th	2

=== Complete TCR Asia Series results ===
(key) (Races in bold indicate pole position) (Races in italics indicate fastest lap)

Year	Team	Car	1	2	3	4	5	6	7	8	9	DC	Points
2015	Craft-Bamboo Racing	SEAT León Cup Racer	MYS; 1	MYS; 2	MYS; 3	SIN; 1; 2	SIN; 2; 4	THA; 1	THA; 2	MAC; 1	MAC; 2	7th*	34*

* Season still in progress.
