= Johnson Huang =

Taiwanese racing driver (born 1974)

- Nationality: Taiwanese
- Born: 22 October 1974 (age 52) Taipei, Taiwan

TCR Asia Series career
- Debut season: 2015
- Current team: Roadstar Racing
- Car number: 97
- Starts: 2

Previous series
- 2014-15 2014-15 2013 2012 2012: Porsche Carrera Cup Asia; Audi R8 LMS Cup; Taiwan Speed Festival; Taiwan Super TSSL Series; Taiwan Super TTCC Series

Championship titles
- 2013: Taiwan Speed Festival - GT-B Class

Johnson Huang (born 22 October 1974) is a Taiwanese racing driver currently competing in the TCR Asia Series. He has previously competed in the Audi R8 LMS Cup and Porsche Carrera Cup Asia amongst others.

== Racing career ==
Huang began his career in 2012 in the Taiwan Super TTCC and TSSL Series. In 2013, he switched to the Taiwan Speed Festival, where he won the GT-B class. From 2014-15, he raced in the Audi R8 LMS Cup and Porsche Carrera Cup Asia.

In October 2015, it was announced that Huang would race in the TCR Asia Series & TCR International Series, driving a SEAT León Cup Racer for Roadstar Racing.

== Racing record ==
=== Complete TCR International Series results ===
(key) (Races in bold indicate pole position) (Races in italics indicate fastest lap)

Year	Team	Car	1	2	3	4	5	6	7	8	9	10	11	12	13	14	15	16	17	18	19	20	21	22	DC	Points
2015	Roadstar Racing	SEAT León Cup Racer	MYS; 1	MYS; 2	CHN; 1	CHN; 2	ESP; 1	ESP; 2	POR; 1	POR; 2	ITA; 1	ITA; 2	AUT; 1	AUT; 2	RUS; 1	RUS; 2	RBR; 1	RBR; 2	SIN; 1	SIN; 2	THA; 1; 16	THA; 2; 15	MAC; 1 DNQ	MAC; 2 DNQ	NC	0
