= Kenneth Lau (racing driver) =

Hong Kong racing driver and businessman

- Nationality: Hongkonger
- Born: 6 June 1960 (age 66) British Hong Kong

TCR Asia Series career
- Debut season: 2015
- Current team: Prince Racing
- Car number: 38
- Starts: 2

Previous series
- 2011-12 2010, 14-15 2009-14 2008-14 2004-05, 08-09, 12, 14: Asian Touring Car Series; Porsche Carrera Cup Asia; Clio Cup China Series; Hong Kong Touring Car Championship; Asian Formula Renault Series

"Kenneth" Lau Chi Yung (born 6 June 1960) is a Hong Kong racing driver and businessman currently competing in the TCR Asia Series and Porsche Carrera Cup Asia. Having previously competed in the Asian Touring Car Series, Clio Cup China Series and Hong Kong Touring Car Championship amongst others.

== Racing career ==
Lau began his career in 2004 in the Asian Formula Renault Series. He raced in the series for many years, finishing eighth in the Masters standings in 2014. He has raced in the Hong Kong Touring Car Championship and the Clio Cup China Series. He finished second in the Clio Cup China Series championship standings in 2010. In 2011, Lau made his Asian Touring Car Series debut, ending second in the championship standings that year.

In August 2015, it was announced that Lau would race in the first ever TCR Asia Series round in Sepang, driving a Honda Civic TCR for Prince Racing.

== Racing record ==
=== Complete TCR International Series results ===
(key) (Races in bold indicate pole position) (Races in italics indicate fastest lap)

Year	Team	Car	1	2	3	4	5	6	7	8	9	10	11	12	13	14	15	16	17	18	19	20	21	22	DC	Points
2015	Prince Racing	Honda Civic TCR	MYS; 1	MYS; 2	CHN; 1	CHN; 2	ESP; 1	ESP; 2	POR; 1	POR; 2	ITA; 1	ITA; 2	AUT; 1	AUT; 2	RUS; 1	RUS; 2	RBR; 1	RBR; 2	SIN; 1 NC	SIN; 2; 14	THA; 1; 15	THA; 2; 14	MAC; 1 Ret	MAC; 2 DNS	NC	0
