= Samson Chan =

Canadian-born Hong Kong racing driver

- Nationality: Hongkonger
- Born: 5 December 1956 (age 69) Canada

TCR Asia Series career
- Debut season: 2015
- Current team: Roadstar Racing
- Car number: 56
- Starts: 3

Previous series
- 2015 2014 2012 2011-12 2010, 12-14 2008, 13-15 2004 2004-05, 07-09, 12-13, 15 1996: Audi R8 LMS Cup; Asian Le Mans Series; Asian GT Series; Malaysian Super Series; GT Asia Series; Porsche Carrera Cup Asia; FIA GT Championship; Asian Formula Renault Series; BPR Global GT Series

Championship titles
- 2012: Asian GT Series

"Samson" Chan Kai Yiu (born 5 December 1956) is a Canadian-born Hong Kong racing driver currently competing in the TCR Asia Series. Having previously competed in the Asian Le Mans Series, GT Asia Series and Asian Formula Renault Series amongst others.

== Racing career ==
Chan began his career in 1996 in the BPR Global GT Series. In 2004, he switched to the Asian Formula Renault Series. From 2008 to 2011, he raced in the Porsche Carrera Cup Asia, GT Asia Series and Malaysian Super Series. In 2012, Chan switched to the Asian GT Series, he won the championship that year. In 2014, he raced in the Asian Le Mans Series, finishing the season third in the standings.

In September 2015, it was announced that Chan would race in the first ever TCR Asia Series round in Sepang, driving a SEAT León Cup Racer for Roadstar Racing.

== Racing record ==
=== Complete TCR International Series results ===
(key) (Races in bold indicate pole position) (Races in italics indicate fastest lap)

Year	Team	Car	1	2	3	4	5	6	7	8	9	10	11	12	13	14	15	16	17	18	19	20	21	22	DC	Points
2015	Roadstar Racing	SEAT León Cup Racer	MYS; 1	MYS; 2	CHN; 1	CHN; 2	ESP; 1	ESP; 2	POR; 1	POR; 2	ITA; 1	ITA; 2	AUT; 1	AUT; 2	RUS; 1	RUS; 2	RBR; 1	RBR; 2	SIN; 1; 17	SIN; 2; 17	THA; 1; 17	THA; 2; 16	MAC; 1; 19	MAC; 2 Ret	NC	0
