= Michael Choi (racing driver) =

Hong Kong racing driver and businessman

Michael Choi 蔡冠明
- Nationality: Hongkonger
- Born: 25 June 1968 (age 58) Hong Kong

TCR Asia Series career
- Debut season: 2015
- Current team: Prince Racing
- Car number: 68
- Starts: 3

Previous series
- 2015 2014 2012-13 2010, 14 2010, 12 2010, 14 2004 2004-06, 08-09, 12, 15: TCR Asia Series; Super Trofeo World Final; Asian Touring Car Series; Porsche Carrera Cup Asia; Clio Cup China Series; GT Asia Series; FIA GT Championship; Asian Formula Renault Series

Championship titles
- 2015: TCR Asia Series
- Statistics up to date as of 12 December 2018.

"Michael" Choi Koon Ming (蔡冠明; born 25 June 1968) is a Hong Kong racing driver and businessman currently competing in the TCR Asia Series. Having previously competed in the Asian Touring Car Series, Clio Cup China Series and Asian Formula Renault Series amongst others.

== Racing career ==
Choi began his career in 2004 in the Asian Formula Renault Series, he finished fifth in standings in 2012. From 2010 to 2014, he raced in the GT Asia Series, Clio Cup China Series, Porsche Carrera Cup Asia and Asian Touring Car Series. He also raced in the Lamborghini Super Trofeo World Final in 2014.

In August 2015, it was announced that Choi would race in the first ever TCR Asia Series round in Sepang, driving a Honda Civic TCR for Prince Racing. On 30 November 2015, Choi was crowned the first champion of the TCR Asia series after the final rounds in Macau.

== Businessman ==
Choi is Chief Executive Officer and Deputy Chairman of Sunwah International. As well, he is Chief Executive Officer of Sunwah Kingsway Capital, a role he has held since 2010. He joined the Group in 1995.

== Racing record ==
=== Complete TCR International Series results ===
(key) (Races in bold indicate pole position) (Races in italics indicate fastest lap)

Year	Team	Car	1	2	3	4	5	6	7	8	9	10	11	12	13	14	15	16	17	18	19	20	21	22	DC	Points
2015	Prince Racing	Honda Civic TCR	MYS; 1	MYS; 2	CHN; 1	CHN; 2	ESP; 1	ESP; 2	POR; 1	POR; 2	ITA; 1	ITA; 2	AUT; 1	AUT; 2	RUS; 1	RUS; 2	RBR; 1	RBR; 2	SIN; 1; 14	SIN; 2; 12	THA; 1; 18	THA; 2; 13	MAC; 1; 16	MAC; 2 Ret	NC	0
