= Prince Racing =

Hong Kong auto racing team

(Hong Kong) Prince Racing
- Team principal(s): Kenneth Lau; Michael Choi
- Current series: TCR International Series; TCR Asia Series
- Former series: Porsche Carrera Cup Asia
- Noted drivers: TCR & TCR Asia; 38. (Hong Kong) Kenneth Lau; 68. (Hong Kong) Michael Choi

Prince Racing is a Hong Kong auto racing team based in Wong Chuk Hang, Hong Kong. The team currently races in the TCR International Series and TCR Asia Series. Having previously raced in the Porsche Carrera Cup Asia amongst others.

== TCR International Series & TCR Asia Series ==
=== Honda Civic TCR (2015–) ===
The team will enter the 2015 TCR International Series season and 2015 TCR Asia Series season with Kenneth Lau and Michael Choi driving a Honda Civic TCR each.
