= TCR Asia Series =

Annual touring car racing event

- Category: Touring cars
- Country: East/Southeast Asia
- Inaugural season: 2015
- Tyre suppliers: Sailun

The TCR Asia Series is an annual touring car racing event that is held at various locations across Asia.

== History ==
TCR Asia Series was announced on 14 August 2014 by the organisation behind the TCR series under the name TC3 Asia Series - later changed to TCR Asia Series along with the other announced series. David Sonenscher, boss of the company Motorsport Asia, will be maintaining the series. He has previously run the Asian Touring Car Series and the Porsche Carrera Cup Asia. Initially seven races were planned for 2015, but later were reduced to 5 and the final calendar was with 4. The Singapore and Thailand rounds were run together with the TCR International Series, while the rest supported the GT Asia Series calendar.

== Champions ==
Drivers' Champions				Teams' Champions	
Year	Driver	Team	Car	Team	Car
2015	(Hong Kong) Michael Choi	(Hong Kong) Prince Racing	Honda Civic TCR	(Macau) Asia Racing Team	SEAT León Cup Racer
2016	(Hong Kong) Andy Yan	(Germany) Liqui Moly Team Engstler	Volkswagen Golf GTI TCR	(Germany) Liqui Moly Team Engstler	Volkswagen Golf GTI TCR
2017	(Thailand) Kantadhee Kusiri	(Germany) Liqui Moly Team Engstler	Volkswagen Golf GTI TCR	(Germany) Liqui Moly Team Engstler	Volkswagen Golf GTI TCR
2018	(Germany) Luca Engstler	(Germany) Liqui Moly Team Engstler	Volkswagen Golf GTI TCR	(Germany) Liqui Moly Team Engstler	Volkswagen Golf GTI TCR
2019	(Germany) Luca Engstler	(Germany) Liqui Moly Team Engstler	Hyundai i30 N TCR	(Germany) Liqui Moly Team Engstler	Hyundai i30 N TCR
2020	Season cancelled due to COVID-19 pandemic				
2021	(China) Jason Zhang	(China) Shell Teamwork Lynk & Co Racing	Lynk & Co 03 TCR	(China) Shell Teamwork Lynk & Co Racing	Lynk & Co 03 TCR
2022	(China) David Zhu	(China) Shell Teamwork Lynk & Co Racing	Lynk & Co 03 TCR	(China) Shell Teamwork Lynk & Co Racing	Lynk & Co 03 TCR
2023	Not held				
2024	(China) Zhang Zhendong	(China) Hyundai N Team Z.Speed	Hyundai Elantra N TCR	(China) Hyundai N Team Z.Speed	Hyundai Elantra N TCR
2025	(Chinese Taipei) Chang Chien Shang	(China) RevX Racing	Audi RS3 LMS TCR	(China) RevX Racing	Audi RS3 LMS TCR
