= 2014 Asian Formula Renault Series =

Motor racing competition

2014 Asian Formula Renault Challenge

Seasons
- ← 2013 2015 →

2014 Asian Formula Renault Series (aka AFR Series) was the 15th Asian Formula Renault Series season since its creation by FRD in 2000. The series was based at the Zhuhai International Circuit, and four rounds of the season were held there. For three of them, AFR joined Pan Delta Racing Festival and for the season finale, it will be a support race of the Zhuhai 500 km Endurance Race. For the fifth round, at the Shanghai International Circuit, the series was the supporting race to the World Endurance Championship 2014 6 Hours of Shanghai In addition, the series also went to the Sepang International Circuit in Malaysia for three-round race weekend.

The 2014 AFR Series saw drivers divided in to three categories: the International, Asian and Masters Classes. The International Class included drivers who were the front runners of previous AFR seasons or other national races. The Asian Class consisted of up-and-coming Asian drivers, while Masters Class was contested by experienced drivers who were 35 years old or above.

== Teams and drivers ==
2014 Entry List
Team	No.	Driver name	Class	Rounds
Champ Motorsport	1	(Colombia) Julio Acosta	I	6
Champ Motorsport	6	(China) Lu Guixiong	A	2
Champ Motorsport	7	(China) Qin Tianqi	A	All
Champ Motorsport	12	(China) Ray Chan	A	1
Champ Motorsport	98	(Hong Kong) Jim Ka To	I	1, 4
FRD Racing Team	2	(Hong Kong) Kenneth Lau	M	1
FRD Racing Team	8	(United Kingdom) Alice Powell	I	2–6
FRD Racing Team	26	(Hong Kong) Chan Wan To	M	2, 4
FRD Racing Team	33	(Hong Kong) Samson Chan	M	3, 6
FRD Racing Team	41	(China) Sky Ling	A	1
Asia Racing Team	3	(Singapore) Ni Weiliang	A	1, 5–6
Asia Racing Team	9	(Switzerland) Thomas Lüdi	M	1–4
Asia Racing Team	11	(China) Pu Jun Jin	A	1, 5–6
Asia Racing Team	18	(Indonesia) Darma Hutomo	A	3
Asia Racing Team	20	(Hong Kong) Thomas Chow	M	3
Asia Racing Team	22	(Malaysia) Mitchell Cheah Min Jie	A	2
Asia Racing Team	36	(Indonesia) Senna Iriawan	A	3
Asia Racing Team	63	(China) Zhi Cong Li	I	4
Asia Racing Team	82	(Hong Kong) Leo Wong	M	2
Asia Racing Team	96	(China) Li Chao	A	6
KRC	5	(China) Yang Fan	A	1, 6
KRC	76	(Taiwan) Chris Chang	M	3–5
KRC	77	(China) Wang Yang	A	1–5
PS Racing	10	(Hong Kong) Sunny Wong	A	6
PS Racing	52	(Hong Kong) Thomas Swift	I	6
PS Racing	61	(France) Guillaume Cunnington	M	All
PS Racing	62	(Mexico) Abelardo Cuellar	I	1–2
PS Racing	64	(United States) Pete Olson	I	1
PS Racing	65	(Italy) Andrea Reggiani	M	1
PS Racing	66	(Canada) Maxx Ebenal	I	All
PS Racing	67	(China) Neric Wei	A	All
PS Racing	68	(France) Sébastien Mailleux	M	1–5
PS Racing	69	(Germany) Markus Engel	M	4-5
PS Racing	99	(China) Victor Liang	A	6
Q Team	14	(China) Jem Chen	M	1
Individual	16	(Canada) Wayne Shen	M	3
Individual	21	(Hong Kong) Dominic Benjamin Tjia	A	3
Individual	28	(Canada) John Shen	M	3
Buzz Racing	23	(Japan) Shigetomo Shimono	I	1, 3–4
Buzz Racing	24	(Japan) Motoaki Ishikawa	I	2
Buzz Racing	25	(Japan) Yosuke Yamazaki	I	3, 6
Buzz Racing	27	(Hong Kong) Chacky Ip	A	2
Buzz Racing	29	(Hong Kong) William Lau	A	4

Icon	Meaning
A	Asian class
I	International class
M	Master class

== Race calendar and results ==
Round		Circuit	Date	Pole position	Overall winner	International Class Winner	Asian Class Winner	Master Class Winner
1	R1	Zhuhai International Circuit (Zhuhai, Guangdong)	22 March	(China) Pu Jun Jin	(Hong Kong) Jim Ka To	(Hong Kong) Jim Ka To	(China) Pu Jun Jin	(France) Guillaume Cunnington
1	R2	Zhuhai International Circuit (Zhuhai, Guangdong)	23 March	(China) Pu Jun Jin	(Japan) Shigetomo Shimono	(Japan) Shigetomo Shimono	(China) Qin Tianqi	(France) Guillaume Cunnington
2	R3	Sepang International Circuit (Kuala Lumpur, Malaysia)	9 May	(Canada) Maxx Ebenal	(Canada) Maxx Ebenal	(Canada) Maxx Ebenal	(China) Qin Tianqi	(France) Guillaume Cunnington
2	R4	Sepang International Circuit (Kuala Lumpur, Malaysia)	10 May	(Canada) Maxx Ebenal	(China) Qin Tianqi	(Canada) Maxx Ebenal	(China) Qin Tianqi	(France) Guillaume Cunnington
2	R5	Sepang International Circuit (Kuala Lumpur, Malaysia)	11 May		(China) Qin Tianqi	(Canada) Maxx Ebenal	(China) Qin Tianqi	(Hong Kong) Leo Wong
3	R6	Zhuhai International Circuit (Zhuhai, Guangdong)	14 June	(Canada) Maxx Ebenal	(United Kingdom) Alice Powell	(United Kingdom) Alice Powell	(China) Qin Tianqi	(Canada) Wayne Shen
3	R7	Zhuhai International Circuit (Zhuhai, Guangdong)	15 June	(Canada) Maxx Ebenal	(Japan) Shigetomo Shimono	(Japan) Shigetomo Shimono	(China) Qin Tianqi	(France) Guillaume Cunnington
4	R8	Zhuhai International Circuit (Zhuhai, Guangdong)	20 September	(United Kingdom) Alice Powell	(United Kingdom) Alice Powell	(United Kingdom) Alice Powell	(China) Qin Tianqi	(France) Guillaume Cunnington
4	R9	Zhuhai International Circuit (Zhuhai, Guangdong)	21 September	(United Kingdom) Alice Powell	(Japan) Shigetomo Shimono	(Japan) Shigetomo Shimono	(China) Wang Yang	(Taiwan) Chris Chang
5	R10	Shanghai International Circuit (Shanghai) †	1 November	(United Kingdom) Alice Powell	(China) Pu Jun Jin	(United Kingdom) Alice Powell	(China) Pu Jun Jin	(France) Guillaume Cunnington
5	R11	Shanghai International Circuit (Shanghai) †	2 November	(United Kingdom) Alice Powell	(China) Pu Jun Jin	(Canada) Maxx Ebenal	(China) Pu Jun Jin	(Hong Kong) Leo Wong
6	R12	Zhuhai International Circuit (Zhuhai, Guangdong)	13 December	(China) Pu Jun Jin	(United Kingdom) Alice Powell	(United Kingdom) Alice Powell	(China) Pu Jun Jin	(Hong Kong) Samson Chan
6	R13	Zhuhai International Circuit (Zhuhai, Guangdong)	13 December	(China) Pu Jun Jin	(United Kingdom) Alice Powell	(United Kingdom) Alice Powell	(China) Pu Jun Jin	(France) Guillaume Cunnington

Notes

† - Supporting race to 2014 FIA World Endurance Championship Round in Shanghai.
