= 2015 Asian Formula Renault Series =

Motor racing competition

Seasons
- ← 2014 2016 →

The 2015 Asian Formula Renault Series (aka AFR Series) was the 16th season of the AFR Series since its creation in 2000 by FRD. The season saw the introduction of the current 2013-spec FR2.0 car, which raced alongside the old-spec FR2.0 cars.

Starting this season, drivers and teams compete in two classes, Class A for drivers and teams competing with the 2013 FR2.0 car, and Class B for drivers and teams using the FR2.0 old spec cars. The season began on 20 March at the Zhuhai International Circuit and ended on 11 October at the Shanghai International Circuit after six double-header events. Three of them were based at Zhuhai, where AFR joined Pan Delta Racing Festival, two of them took place at Shanghai, with the other round being held at Sepang in Malaysia.

== Teams and drivers ==
Team	No.	Driver name	Class	Rounds
S&D Motorsports	2	(Malaysia) Najiy Ayyad bin Abd Razak	A	All
S&D Motorsports	14	(Thailand) Umar bin Abdul Rahman	A	All
Asia Racing Team	3	(Singapore) Ni Weiliang	A	All
Asia Racing Team	8	(Indonesia) Darma Hutomo	A	All
Asia Racing Team	11	(China) Pu Jun Jin	A	1–3
Asia Racing Team	17	(United Kingdom) James Runacres	B	All
Asia Racing Team	21	(China) Liu Kai	A	3
BlackArts Racing Team	5	(China) Liang Jia Tong	B	5–6
BlackArts Racing Team	9	(Switzerland) Thomas Lüdi	A	2–3, 5–6
BlackArts Racing Team	16	(United Kingdom) Dan Wells	A	All
BlackArts Racing Team	66	(Canada) Maxx Ebenal	A	All
BlackArts Racing Team	82	(Taiwan) Leo Wong	A	4
Champ Motorsport	6	(China) Xie Ruilin	B	3
KCMG	10	(Hong Kong) Alan Lee	A	6
KCMG	29	(Australia) Garnet Patterson	A	1–5
KRC Racing	15	(China) Alex Yang	A	5
KRC Racing	47	(China) Andy Zheng	B	1–2, 4–6
KRC Racing	67	(Taiwan) Jason Kang	B	5
KRC Racing	90	(Canada) Wei Lu	B	6
KRC Racing	99	(China) Min Heng	B	3
Heart Forex Buzz Racing	18	(Japan) Shigetomo Shimono	B	3
Sniper Capital Racing	26	(Macau) Filipe Clemente de Souza	B	6
Sniper Capital Racing	28	(Macau) João Carlos Afonso	B	6
PS Racing	36	(Hong Kong) David Lau	B	4
PS Racing	52	(Hong Kong) Thomas Swift	B	All
PS Racing	61	(France) Guillaume Cunnington	B	6
PS Racing	64	(China) Neric Wei	B	5
PS Racing	68	(France) Sébastien Mailleux	B	All
PS Racing	69	(Germany) Markus Engel	B	1
guest drivers ineligible to score points
Individual entries	7	(Hong Kong) Michael Choi	B	1
Individual entries	22	(Hong Kong) Terence Tse	B	4
Individual entries	33	(Hong Kong) Samson Chan	B	1
Individual entries	41	(China) Sky Ling	B	3

Icon	Class
A	Class A
B	Class B

== Race calendar and results ==
Round		Circuit	Date	Pole position	Fastest lap	Overall winner	Class A Winner	Class B Winner
1	R1	Zhuhai International Circuit (Zhuhai, Guangdong)	21 March	(Indonesia) Darma Hutomo	(Indonesia) Darma Hutomo	(Canada) Maxx Ebenal	(Canada) Maxx Ebenal	(China) Andy Zheng
1	R2	Zhuhai International Circuit (Zhuhai, Guangdong)	22 March	(Canada) Maxx Ebenal	(Canada) Maxx Ebenal	(Canada) Maxx Ebenal	(Canada) Maxx Ebenal	(China) Andy Zheng
2	R3	Sepang International Circuit (Kuala Lumpur, Malaysia)	25 April	(United Kingdom) Dan Wells	(United Kingdom) Dan Wells	(United Kingdom) Dan Wells	(United Kingdom) Dan Wells	(China) Andy Zheng
2	R4	Sepang International Circuit (Kuala Lumpur, Malaysia)	26 April	(Indonesia) Darma Hutomo	(China) Pu Jun Jin	(United Kingdom) Dan Wells	(United Kingdom) Dan Wells	(China) Andy Zheng
3	R5	Zhuhai International Circuit (Zhuhai, Guangdong)	20 June	(United Kingdom) Dan Wells	(United Kingdom) Dan Wells	(United Kingdom) Dan Wells	(United Kingdom) Dan Wells	(Japan) Shigetomo Shimono
3	R6	Zhuhai International Circuit (Zhuhai, Guangdong)	21 June	(United Kingdom) Dan Wells	(United Kingdom) Dan Wells	(United Kingdom) Dan Wells	(United Kingdom) Dan Wells	(Japan) Shigetomo Shimono
4	R7	Shanghai International Circuit (Shanghai)	11 July	(Canada) Maxx Ebenal	(United Kingdom) Dan Wells	(United Kingdom) Dan Wells	(United Kingdom) Dan Wells	(China) Andy Zheng
4	R8	Shanghai International Circuit (Shanghai)	12 July	(Canada) Maxx Ebenal	(United Kingdom) Dan Wells	(United Kingdom) Dan Wells	(United Kingdom) Dan Wells	(China) Andy Zheng
5	R9	Zhuhai International Circuit (Zhuhai, Guangdong)	19 September	(United Kingdom) Dan Wells	(United Kingdom) Dan Wells	(United Kingdom) Dan Wells	(United Kingdom) Dan Wells	(Taiwan) Jason Kang
5	R10	Zhuhai International Circuit (Zhuhai, Guangdong)	20 September	(United Kingdom) Dan Wells	(United Kingdom) Dan Wells	(United Kingdom) Dan Wells	(United Kingdom) Dan Wells	(China) Andy Zheng
6	R11	Shanghai International Circuit (Shanghai)	10 October	(United Kingdom) Dan Wells	(United Kingdom) Dan Wells	(United Kingdom) Dan Wells	(United Kingdom) Dan Wells	(Canada) Wei Lu
6	R12	Shanghai International Circuit (Shanghai)	11 October	(United Kingdom) Dan Wells	(United Kingdom) Dan Wells	(United Kingdom) Dan Wells	(United Kingdom) Dan Wells	(Canada) Wei Lu

== Championship standings ==
Points system

Points were awarded to the top 14 classified finishers. Only drivers competing in at least three rounds are eligible for points.

Drivers' Championship
Position	**1st**	**2nd**	**3rd**	**4th**	**5th**	**6th**	**7th**	**8th**	**9th**	**10th**	**11th**	**12th**	**13th**	**14th**
Points	30	24	20	17	15	13	11	9	7	5	4	3	2	1

=== Drivers' Championships ===
Pos	Driver	ZIC1 (China)		SEP (Malaysia)		ZIC2 (China)		SIC1 (China)		ZIC3 (China)		SIC2 (China)		Pts
Class A
1	(United Kingdom) Dan Wells	6	6	**1**	1	**1**	**1**	1	1	**1**	**1**	**1**	**1**	330
2	(Australia) Garnet Patterson	3	4	2	2	2	5	3	2	2	2			223
3	(Canada) Maxx Ebenal	1	**1**	Ret	Ret	4	2	**8**	**12**	3	DSQ	3	2	191
4	(Malaysia) Najiy Ayyad bin Abd Razak	4	Ret	5	3	13	6	4	3	5	3	4	3	185
5	(Indonesia) Darma Hutomo	**2**	Ret	3	**Ret**	12	4	2	14	4	4	2	4	184
6	(Singapore) Ni Weiliang	8	5	10	10	7	Ret	14	6	7	12	7	7	152
7	(Thailand) Umar bin Abdul Rahman	15	10	11	Ret	Ret	15	7	11	13	13	15	13	118
8	(China) Pu Jun Jin	5	Ret	4	4	3	3							89
9	(Switzerland) Thomas Lüdi			12	6	Ret	7			6	Ret	6	5	78
guest drivers ineligible to score points
	(Taiwan) Leo Wong							5	4					0
	(China) Alex Yang									14	8			0
	(China) Liu Kai					14	9							0
	(Hong Kong) Alan Lee											14	11	0
Class B
1	(China) Andy Zheng	7	2	6	5			6	5	Ret	5	8	8	270
2	(United Kingdom) James Runacres	11	8	7	7	9	16	9	13	12	14	11	12	254
3	(France) Sébastien Mailleux	14	9	8	9	6	11	11	7	11	6	12	Ret	243
4	(Hong Kong) Thomas Swift	10	7	9	8	Ret	12	13	10	10	11	13	9	237
guest drivers ineligible to score points
	(Germany) Markus Engel	9	3											0
	(Canada) Wei Lu											5	6	0
	(Japan) Shigetomo Shimono					5	8							0
	(China) Neric Wei									Ret	7			0
	(Taiwan) Jason Kang									8	10			0
	(Hong Kong) David Lau							10	8					0
	(China) Sky Ling					8	13							0
	(China) Liang Jia Tong									9	9	9	15	0
	(Hong Kong) Terence Tse							12	9					0
	(China) Min Heng					10	10							0
	(Macau) Filipe Clemente de Souza											10	10	0
	(China) Xie Ruilin					11	14							0
	(Hong Kong) Samson Chan	12	DNS											0
	(Hong Kong) Michael Choi	13	DNS											0
	(Macau) João Carlos Afonso											16	14	0
	(France) Guillaume Cunnington											DNS	DNS	0
Pos	Driver	ZIC1 (China)		SEP (Malaysia)		ZIC2 (China)		SIC1 (China)		ZIC3 (China)		SIC2 (China)		Pts

Colour	Result
Gold	Winner
Silver	Second place
Bronze	Third place
Green	Points classification
Blue	Non-points classification
Blue	Non-classified finish (NC)
Purple	Retired, not classified (Ret)
Red	Did not qualify (DNQ)
Red	Did not pre-qualify (DNPQ)
Black	Disqualified (DSQ)
White	Did not start (DNS)
White	Withdrew (WD)
White	Race cancelled (C)
Blank	Did not practice (DNP)
Blank	Did not arrive (DNA)
Blank	Excluded (EX)

**Bold** – Pole
Italics – Fastest Lap
