= 2013 Asian Formula Renault Series =

Motor racing competition

Seasons
- ← 2012 2014 →

2013 Asian Formula Renault Series (a.k.a. AFR Series) is the 14th season since its being created by FRD back in 2000. The Series bases the races in Zhuhai International Circuit as 4 rounds of races to be held there. For three of them, AFR joined Pan Delta Racing Festival and for the season finale, it will be a support race of the Zhuhai 500 km Endurance Race. Moreover, the AFR series will return to Shanghai for this season as the series holds a round of races on May 1–2 at Shanghai International Circuit.

This year's AFR Series will see drivers to be divided in three categories – International, Asian and Masters Class. The International Class will include drivers who are the front runners of previous AFR seasons or other national races. Asian Class will consist of the up-and-coming Asian drivers. Meanwhile, Masters Class will be the battlefield for experienced drivers who are 35 or above. The points scoring system is twisted by a bit this year as well, as the championship will count towards the best 8 rounds out of 10. This change shall stimulate the battle for the championship.

== Teams and drivers ==
I = International Class A = Asian Class M = Master Class

2013 Entry List
| Team | No. | Driver name | Class | Rounds |
|---|---|---|---|---|
| Asia Racing Team | 3 | (Singapore) Ni Weiliang | A | 3–4 |
| Asia Racing Team | 7 | (China) Yang Xi | I | 2 |
| Asia Racing Team | 9 | (Switzerland) Thomas Lüdi | M | All |
| Asia Racing Team | 10 | (Hong Kong) Thomas Chow | M | 2 |
| Asia Racing Team | 24 | (United States) Robert Buchheit | M | 4 |
| Asia Racing Team | 28 | (Canada) Karl Yip | A | 5 |
| Asia Racing Team | 69 | (Singapore) Kenneth Low | M | 1 |
| Asia Racing Team | 76 | (France) Guillaume Cunnington | M | 5 |
| Asia Racing Team | 81 | (Israel) Eitan Zidkilov | M | 5 |
| Asia Racing Team | 82 | (Hong Kong) Leo Wong | M | All |
| Asia Racing Team | 96 | (China) Li Chao | A | 4 |
| Buzz Racing | 22 | (Japan) Yuki Shiraishi | I | 1, 4 |
| Buzz Racing | 23 | (Japan) Shigetomo Shimono | I | 1, 3–5 |
| Champ Motorsport | 8 | (China) Yuan Bo | A | 2, 5 |
| Champ Motorsport | 15 | (Indonesia) Alexandra Asmasoebrata | I | 4 |
| Champ Motorsport | 19 | (Macau) William Lau | A | 4 |
| Champ Motorsport | 77 | (Hong Kong) Ronald Wu | I | 2 |
| Champ Motorsport | 88 | (Hong Kong) Yung Hau Woon | M | 4 |
| Champ Motorsport | 91 | (Colombia) Julio Acosta | I | All |
| Champ Motorsport | 98 | (Hong Kong) Jim Ka To | I | 5 |
| FRD Racing Team | 1 | (Hong Kong) Tommy Chan | I | 2 |
| FRD Racing Team | 5 | (Hong Kong) Samson Chan | M | 1 |
| FRD Racing Team | 13 | (Hong Kong) Kenneth Ma | M | 2 |
| FRD Racing Team | 99 | (South Africa) Naomi Schiff | I | 4 |
| KRC | 2 | (China) Leo Ye | A | 4–5 |
| KRC | 11 | (Taiwan) Jason Kang | A | 1–2, 4–5 |
| PS Racing | 12 | (Hong Kong) Sunny Wong | I | 1, 4 |
| PS Racing | 15 | (Indonesia) Alexandra Asmasoebrata | I | 1, 3 |
| PS Racing | 17 | (China) Neric Wei | A | 2–5 |
| PS Racing | 20 | (United States) Pete Olson | I | 1, 3–5 |
| PTRS | 14 | (Taiwan) Jem Chen | M | 1, 4 |
| PTRS | 18 | (Taiwan) Roy Chiu | A | 1 |
| Q Team | 18 | (Taiwan) Roy Chiu | A | 3 |

== Race calendar ==
| Round | | Circuit | Date | Pole position | Overall winner | International Class Winner | Asian Class Winner | Master Class Winner |
|---|---|---|---|---|---|---|---|---|
| 1 | R1 | Zhuhai International Circuit (Zhuhai, Guangdong) | 15–17 March | (Colombia) Julio Acosta | (Japan) Shigetomo Shimono | (Japan) Shigetomo Shimono | (Taiwan) Roy Chiu | (Hong Kong) Leo Wong |
| 1 | R2 | Zhuhai International Circuit (Zhuhai, Guangdong) | 15–17 March | (Colombia) Julio Acosta | (Japan) Yuki Shiraishi | (Japan) Yuki Shiraishi | (Taiwan) Jason Kang | (Switzerland) Thomas Lüdi |
| 2 | R3 | Shanghai International Circuit (Shanghai) | 1–2 May | (Hong Kong) Ronald Wu | (China) Yuan Bo | (Colombia) Julio Acosta | (China) Yuan Bo | (Hong Kong) Kenneth Ma |
| 2 | R4 | Shanghai International Circuit (Shanghai) | 1–2 May | (Hong Kong) Ronald Wu | (China) Yuan Bo | (Colombia) Julio Acosta | (China) Yuan Bo | (Hong Kong) Kenneth Ma |
| 3 | R5 | Zhuhai International Circuit (Zhuhai, Guangdong) | 14–16 June | (Japan) Shigetomo Shimono | (Colombia) Julio Acosta | (Colombia) Julio Acosta | (Taiwan) Roy Chiu | (Hong Kong) Leo Wong |
| 3 | R6 | Zhuhai International Circuit (Zhuhai, Guangdong) | 14–16 June | (Japan) Shigetomo Shimono | (Japan) Shigetomo Shimono | (Japan) Shigetomo Shimono | (Taiwan) Roy Chiu | (Hong Kong) Leo Wong |
| 4 | R7 | Zhuhai International Circuit (Zhuhai, Guangdong) | 13–15 September | (Japan) Yuki Shiraishi | (China) Leo Ye | (Japan) Shigetomo Shimono | (China) Leo Ye | (Hong Kong) Leo Wong |
| 4 | R8 | Zhuhai International Circuit (Zhuhai, Guangdong) | 13–15 September | (Japan) Yuki Shiraishi | (Japan) Shigetomo Shimono | (Japan) Shigetomo Shimono | (China) Leo Ye | (Hong Kong) Leo Wong |
| 5 | R9 | Zhuhai International Circuit (Zhuhai, Guangdong) | 20–21 December | (China) Leo Ye | (China) Leo Ye | (Hong Kong) Jim Ka To | (China) Leo Ye | (Hong Kong) Leo Wong |
| 5 | R10 | Zhuhai International Circuit (Zhuhai, Guangdong) | 20–21 December | (China) Leo Ye | (China) Leo Ye | (Colombia) Julio Acosta | (China) Leo Ye | (Hong Kong) Leo Wong |

== Championship Winners ==
| International Class | Team Champion | Asian Class | Team Champion | Master Class | Team Champion |
|---|---|---|---|---|---|
| (Colombia) Julio Acosta | (China) Champ Motorsport | (Taiwan) Jason Kang | (Taiwan) KRC | (Hong Kong) Leo Wong | (China) Asia Racing Team |
