= Li Zhicong =

Chinese racing driver

Li Zhicong 黎智聪
- Nationality: Chinese
- Born: 25 August 1993 (age 33) Guangzhou, China

FIA Formula 3 European Championship
- Years active: 2015–2016
- Teams: Fortec Motorsport; Carlin Motorsport
- Starts: 31
- Wins: 0
- Poles: 0
- Fastest laps: 0
- Best finish: NC in 2015

Previous series
- 2008–12 2013–14: Asian Formula Renault Series; British Formula 3 International Series

Li Zhicong (Chinese: 黎智聪, born 25 August 1993 in Guangzhou), also known as Peter Li, is a racing driver from China. He formerly competed in the FIA Formula 3 European Championship.

Li is best known for his involvement in a serious accident at a Formula 3 meeting at the Red Bull Ring in 2016 in which he broke both heels and fractured four vertebrae.

== Racing record ==
=== Career summary ===
| Season | Series | Team | Races | Wins | Poles | F/Laps | Podiums | Points | Position |
|---|---|---|---|---|---|---|---|---|---|
| 2009 | Asian Formula Renault Series | PTRS Team | 12 | 0 | 0 | 0 | 0 | 125 | 6th |
| 2009 | Australian Drivers' Championship - National A | R-Tek Motorsport Services | 2 | 0 | 0 | 0 | 0 | 10 | 12th |
| 2010 | Asian Formula Renault Series | PTRS Team | 4 | 1 | 0 | 1 | 1 | 134.5 | 5th |
| 2010 | Asian Formula Renault Series | Asia Racing Team | 8 | 0 | 0 | 0 | 1 | 134.5 | 5th |
| 2010 | Formula BMW Pacific | Asia Racing Team | 1 | 0 | 0 | 0 | 0 | 0 | NC† |
| 2011 | Asian Formula Renault Series | Asia Racing Team | 4 | 0 | 0 | 0 | 2 | 72 | 8th |
| 2011 | Formula Pilota China | Asia Racing Team | 12 | 0 | 0 | 0 | 2 | 67 | 6th |
| 2012 | Asian Formula Renault Series | Asia Racing Team | 4 | 1 | 1 | 2 | 3 | 89 | 5th |
| 2012 | GT Asia Series | Asia Racing Team | 11 | 3 | 0 | 3 | 8 | 138 | **2nd** |
| 2013 | British Formula 3 International Series | Carlin | 3 | 0 | 0 | 0 | 0 | 7 | 13rd |
| 2013 | GT Asia Series | Asia Racing Team | ? | 2 | 2 | ? | ? | 81 | **1st** |
| 2013 | Porsche Carrera Cup Asia | Kamlung Racing | 12 | 0 | 0 | 0 | 0 | 61 | 11st |
| 2014 | British Formula 3 International Series | Carlin | 21 | 0 | 0 | 0 | 3 | 118 | 5th |
| 2014 | Asian Formula Renault Series | Asia Racing Team | 2 | 0 | 0 | 1 | 0 | 17 | 11st |
| 2014 | Porsche Carrera Cup Asia | Kamlung Racing Team | 2 | 0 | 0 | 0 | 0 | 0 | NC† |
| 2015 | FIA Formula 3 European Championship | Fortec Motorsports | 21 | 0 | 0 | 0 | 0 | 0 | 37th |
| 2015 | Macau Grand Prix | Jo Zeller Racing | 2 | 0 | 0 | 0 | 0 | N/A | 21st |
| 2015-16 | Asian Le Mans Series - LMP3 | Team AAI | 1 | 0 | 0 | 0 | 0 | 0 | NC† |
| 2016 | FIA Formula 3 European Championship | Carlin | 10 | 0 | 0 | 0 | 0 | 0 | 23rd |
| 2017 | Blancpain GT Series Asia | Craft-Bamboo Racing | 7 | 0 | 1 | 0 | 0 | 25 | 20th |
| 2017 | China GT Championship - GTC | JRM Elite | 2 | 0 | 0 | 0 | 0 | 3 | 25th |
| 2019 | Asian Formula Renault Series | Asia Racing Team | 4 | 0 | 0 | 0 | 1 | 61 | 8th |
| 2022 | Open Formula Challenge | Asia Racing Team | 2 | 0 | 0 | ? | 1 | ? | ? |
| 2024 | Lamborghini Super Trofeo Asia - Pro | Blackjack Racing | 4 | 0 | 0 | 0 | 1 | 33 | 7th |
| 2024 | Porsche Carrera Cup Asia | Trans-China Automotive Racing | 2 | 0 | 0 | 0 | 0 | 0 | NC† |
| 2025 | Porsche Carrera Cup Asia | 610 Racing | 2 | 0 | 0 | 0 | 0 | 0 | NC† |
| 2025 | Lamborghini Super Trofeo Asia - Pro | Racegraph | 12 | 1 | 2 | 2 | 7 | 114 | **3rd** |
| 2026 | China GT Championship - GT3 | TBC by 610Racing | 4 | 0 | 0 | 0 | 0 | 0 | NC† |
| 2026 | Lamborghini Super Trofeo Asia - Pro | Lamborghini Bundang by Racegraph | 12 | 2 | 1 | 2 | 10 | 119 | 4th |

=== Complete British Formula 3 International Series results ===
(key) (Races in bold indicate pole position) (Races in italics indicate fastest lap)

| Year | Entrant | 1 | 2 | 3 | 4 | 5 | 6 | 7 | 8 | 9 | 10 | 11 | 12 | 13 | 14 | 15 | 16 | 17 | 18 | 19 | 20 | 21 | DC | Points |
|---|---|---|---|---|---|---|---|---|---|---|---|---|---|---|---|---|---|---|---|---|---|---|---|---|
| 2013 | Carlin | SIL; 1 | SIL; 2 | SIL; 3 | SPA; 1 | SPA; 2 | SPA; 3 | BRH; 1; 11 | BRH; 2; 12 | BRH; 3; 10 | NÜR; 1 | NÜR; 2 | NÜR; 3 | | | | | | | | | | 13th | 7 |
| 2014 | Carlin | ROC; 1 Ret | ROC; 2; 7 | ROC; 3; 5 | SIL; 1; 7 | SIL; 2; 3 | SIL; 3 Ret | SNE; 1; 5 | SNE; 2 Ret | SNE; 3; 5 | SPA; 1; 9 | SPA; 2 Ret | SPA; 3; 9 | THR; 1; 3 | THR; 2; 3 | THR; 3; 5 | BRH; 1; 7 | BRH; 2; 6 | BRH; 3 Ret | DON; 1; 5 | DON; 2; 4 | DON; 3; 4 | 5th | 118 |

=== Complete FIA Formula 3 European Championship results ===
(key) (Races in bold indicate pole position; races in italics indicate fastest lap)

| Year | Entrant | Engine | 1 | 2 | 3 | 4 | 5 | 6 | 7 | 8 | 9 | 10 | 11 | 12 | 13 | 14 | 15 | 16 | 17 | 18 | 19 | 20 | 21 | 22 | 23 | 24 | 25 | 26 | 27 | 28 | 29 | 30 | 31 | 32 | 33 | DC | Points |
|---|---|---|---|---|---|---|---|---|---|---|---|---|---|---|---|---|---|---|---|---|---|---|---|---|---|---|---|---|---|---|---|---|---|---|---|---|---|
| 2015 | Fortec Motorsports | Mercedes | SIL; 1 Ret | SIL; 2; 28 | SIL; 3; 27 | HOC; 1; 25 | HOC; 2; 29 | HOC; 3; 29 | PAU; 1 | PAU; 2 | PAU; 3 | MNZ; 1 | MNZ; 2 | MNZ; 3 | SPA; 1 | SPA; 2 | SPA; 3 | NOR; 1 | NOR; 2 | NOR; 3 | ZAN; 1; 26 | ZAN; 2; 31 | ZAN; 3; 26 | RBR; 1; 32 | RBR; 2; 23 | RBR; 3; 30 | ALG; 1; 26 | ALG; 2; 22 | ALG; 3; 19 | NÜR; 1; 27 | NÜR; 2; 23 | NÜR; 3; 20 | HOC; 1 Ret | HOC; 2; 27 | HOC; 3; 19 | 37th | 0 |
| 2016 | Carlin | Volkswagen | LEC; 1; 20 | LEC; 2; 15 | LEC; 3; 17 | HUN; 1; 15 | HUN; 2 Ret | HUN; 3; 16 | PAU; 1 Ret | PAU; 2; 12 | PAU; 3 Ret | RBR; 1; 18 | RBR; 2 DNS | RBR; 3 DNS | NOR; 1 | NOR; 2 | NOR; 3 | ZAN; 1 | ZAN; 2 | ZAN; 3 | SPA; 1 | SPA; 2 | SPA; 3 | NÜR; 1 | NÜR; 2 | NÜR; 3 | IMO; 1 | IMO; 2 | IMO; 3 | HOC; 1 | HOC; 2 | HOC; 3 | | | | 23rd | 0 |
