= Vertu Motors =

Car dealership group

Vertu Motors plc
- Type: Public
- Traded as: LSE: VTU
- Founded: 2006; 20 years ago
- Headquarters: Fifth Avenue Business Park; Fifth Avenue; Gateshead
- Key people: Robert Forrester (CEO)
- Website: www.vertumotors.com

Vertu Motors plc is a car dealership group established in 2006 in the United Kingdom that currently trades under the brand name Vertu. It is listed on the Alternative Investment Market and was named as Retailer of the Year at the 2025 Autotrader Retailer Awards.

The company began trading in 2007 after acquiring Bristol Street Motors, a Birmingham-based car dealership that was originally founded in the city back in 1924, and which had expanded to include sites across the country.

The growth of the company developed with the purchase of the Yorkshire-based dealership Farnell Land Rover in 2013. They were rebranded as Vertu Land Rover in 2021.

In 2018, Vertu acquired Hughes Group Holdings and its subsidiary Hughes of Beaconsfield and the company has continued to grow since then with a number of acquisitions both small and large, including major expansion in the South West with the purchase of Helston Garages in 2022 and Rowes Garage Ltd in 2023.

The addition of Burrows Motors Company in Yorkshire saw the Vertu portfolio increase to more than 200 individual sites across England and Scotland.

The company represents a wide range of manufacturers and now operates dealerships exclusively under the Vertu name following a brand consolidation programme carried out in early 2025.

Up to that point, Vertu had operated three separate retail brands but after celebrating its centenary in 2024, the Bristol Street Motors name disappeared from dealerships in April 2025 when they were all rebranded to Vertu; creating one network of dealerships across the country.

The Macklin Motors brand, which had launched in 2010 and stretched from Ayr in the West across to Edinburgh in the East, had earlier rebranded as Vertu in February 2025.

Alongside the retail side of the business, Vertu also operates a range of ancillary businesses that include Vansdirect and Wiperblades.co.uk.

== Dealerships/Manufacturers ==
Following the brand consolidation, Vertu now operates an expansive network of dealerships that stretches across England and Scotland and which all run under the Vertu name.

The only exception is in Exeter, where the Carrs Ferrari site is Vertu-owned.

As of February 2026, Vertu operates dealerships representing the following manufacturers, with the most recent additions being Geely Auto and Omoda / Jaecoo :

- Audi – a single dealership located in Hereford
- BMW – including dealerships in Sunderland, Yeovil and York
- BYD – including Macclesfield, Gloucester and Worcester
- Citroen – including Harlow and Northampton
- CUPRA – including Carlisle
- Dacia – stretching from Dunfermline down to Plymouth
- Ford – including Glasgow, Birmingham and Wigan
- Geely – in Glasgow
- Honda – a network of dealerships that includes Lincoln and Truro
- Hyundai – including Banbury and Edinburgh
- Kia – including Bradford and Barnsley
- Land Rover – including Bolton, Nelson and Guiseley
- Mazda – including Hamilton and Sheffield
- Mercedes-Benz – including dealerships in Ascot and Reading
- MG – including a dealerships in Beaconsfield and Chesterfield
- MINI – running alongside BMW dealerships in the likes of Bridgwater and Teesside
- Nissan – a dozen dealerships that include Widnes and Ilkeston
- Omoda / Jaecoo - including the first site in Burton
- Peugeot – including dealerships in Oxford and Paisley
- Renault – including Exeter and Leicester
- SEAT – including dealerships in Darlington and Derby
- Skoda – including Chesterfield and Nottingham
- smart – two sites in Beaconsfield and Reading
- Toyota – including Ayr and Loughborough
- Vauxhall – nearly 20 sites that include Hexham, Lichfield and Waltham Cross
- Volkswagen – which includes sites in Leeds and Skipton
- Volvo – across the South West in the likes of Truro and Taunton

== Partnerships ==
Vertu has a range of different partnerships across the worlds of sport and entertainment, both at a brand and a local level.

One of Vertu's main partnerships revolves around the BTCC, where the company has backed the EXCELR8 team since 2021 and took up the role of title sponsor for the 2022 campaign, where it secured the title with Tom Ingram. Having previously competed under the Bristol Street Motors name, the team reverted to running as Team VERTU from the 2025 season, where Ingram was once again crowned champion.

The company was also the title sponsor of the MINI CHALLENGE that runs as a support series to the BTCC, a role it adopted from the start of 2023 and which ran through to the conclusion of 2025.

Other motorsport-related partnerships saw Vertu sponsor Channel 4 F1 from 2020-2022 through the Bristol Street Motors and Macklin Motors brands, whilst the Click2Drive Bristol Street Motors Racing team competed in the 2022 W Series season with drivers Alice Powell and Jessica Hawkins.

Vertu also operates a number of partnerships in football, the biggest of which saw it named as front-of-shirt sponsor for Burnley FC ahead of the 2026/27 season in an expansion of a long-standing relationship dating back to 2022.

The company also holds long-running partnerships with Plymouth Argyle and Birmingham City F.C., and previously worked alongside the likes of Middlesbrough FC,, Sunderland FC, Hearts and Hibernian FC.

Vertu was also named as the Official Car Dealer of the English Football League in November 2023. The multi-year deal saw the EFL Trophy being referred to as the Bristol Street Motors Trophy for the 2023/24 season before it was rebranded as the Vertu Trophy midway through the following season as part of the brand consolidation.

Vertu sponsors the Newcastle Eagles basketball team, whose home stadium is now called the Vertu Motors Arena, whilst it has a relationship with the Scottish side Caledonia Gladiators.

Cricket relationships with Yorkshire County Cricket Club., Nottinghamshire County Cricket Club and Edgbaston - as well as a deal with Exeter Chiefs Rugby Club - round out an expansive sports portfolio.

Vertu sponsors two entertainment venues, being a founding partner of Co-op Live in Manchester where it has naming rights over the atrium area known as Vertu Place. The company is also a partner of the Newcastle Theatre Royal.

== Awards ==
Vertu has secured numerous awards from manufacturers and the motoring press through the years across its different brands, including:

- 2015 – Best Retailer Digital Customer Experience, Auto Trader Click Awards
- 2017 – Motability Dealer Group of the Year
- 2019 - Best Customer Experience, Auto Trader Retailer Awards
- 2019 - Motability Website of the Year
- 2019 – Best Van Leasing Broker, Leasing Broker Federation Awards
- 2021 - Best Used Car Online Sales Experience, Used Car Awards
- 2022 - Social Media of the Year, Motor Trader Industry Awards
- 2022 - Dealer Website of the Year (Franchised), Motor Trader Industry Awards
- 2023 - Best Local Campaign (SEO - Large), UK Search Awards
- 2023 – Business Leader of the Year (Robert Forrester), Automotive Management Awards
- 2023 – Social Media of the Year, Motor Trader Industry Awards
- 2024 – EV Retailer of the Year, Carwow Inside Line Awards
- 2024 – Best Customer Experience: Group, Carwow Inside Line Awards
- 2024 – Outstanding Achievement Award (Robert Forrester), Motor Trader Industry Awards
- 2025 - Autotrader Retailer Awards - Retailer of the Year, Innovation of the Year, Customer Experience Award
