= Neric Wei =

Chinese racing driver (born 1981)

Chao Yin Wei
- Nationality: Chinese
- Born: 21 March 1981 (age 45) Guangdong, China

TCR International Series career
- Debut season: 2016
- Car number: 64
- Former teams: Son Veng Racing Team
- Starts: 2

Previous series
- 2016 2016 2013-15 2013 2013 2010-12: TCR Asia Series; Asian Le Mans Series Sprint Cup; Asian Formula Renault Series; Macau Lotus Greater China Race; Lotus Interport Cup Series; Zhuhai Pan Delta Super Racing Festival

Championship titles
- 2013 2010-12: Lotus Interport Cup Series; Zhuhai Pan Delta Super Racing Festival

Chao Yin "Neric" Wei (born 21 March 1981) is a Chinese racing driver who Formally competed in the TCR International Series and TCR Asia Series. Having previously competed in the Asian Le Mans Series Sprint Cup, Asian Formula Renault Series and Lotus Interport Cup Series amongst others.

== Racing career ==
Wei began his career in 2010 in the Zhuhai Pan Delta Super Racing Festival, he won the championship three years in a row, from 2010 to 2012. He switched to the Lotus Interport Cup Series in 2013 and won the title that year. He also raced in the Asian Formula Renault Series in 2013, finishing fifth in the championship standings that year. He also took part in the Macau Lotus Greater China Race that year. For 2014, he returned to the Asian Formula Renault Series, finishing third in the championship that year. He stayed there for 2015, finishing twelfth in the standings. He switched to the new Asian Le Mans Series Sprint Cup of 2016, winning the CN class that season. He switched to the TCR Asia Series following his season in the Asian Le Mans Series Sprint Cup, joining the series at the third round held in Shanghai.

In September 2016, it was announced that Wei would race in the TCR International Series, driving a Volkswagen Golf GTI TCR for Son Veng Racing Team.

== Racing record ==
=== Complete TCR International Series results ===
(key) (Races in bold indicate pole position) (Races in italics indicate fastest lap)

Year	Team	Car	1	2	3	4	5	6	7	8	9	10	11	12	13	14	15	16	17	18	19	20	21	22	DC	Points
2016	Son Veng Racing Team	Volkswagen Golf GTI TCR	BHR; 1	BHR; 2	EST; 1	EST; 2	SPA; 1	SPA; 2	IMO; 1	IMO; 2	SAL; 1	SAL; 2	OSC; 1	OSC; 2	SOC; 1	SOC; 2	CHA; 1	CHA; 2	MRN; 1; 15	MRN; 2 DSQ	SEP; 1	SEP; 2	MAC; 1; 12	MAC; 2; 16	NC	0

^{†} Driver did not finish the race, but was classified as he completed over 90% of the race distance.

=== TCR Spa 500 results ===
Year	Team	Co-Drivers	Car	Class	Laps	Pos.	Class Pos.
2019	(Hong Kong) Teamwork Huff Motorsport	(China) Yan Chuang (China) Rainey He (Hong Kong) Andy Yan	Audi RS 3 LMS TCR	**PA**	409	9th DNF/Retired	4th DNF/Retired
