= 2015 Japanese Formula 3 Championship =

Seasons
- ← 2014 2016 →

The 2015 Japanese Formula 3 Championship was the 37th edition of the Japanese Formula 3 Championship.

== Teams and drivers ==
All teams were Japanese-registered.

Team	Chassis	Engine	No.	Driver	Rounds
Championship Class
Toda Racing	Dallara F312	Toda TR-F301	2	(Japan) Keishi Ishikawa	All
HFDP Racing	Dallara F312	Mugen-Honda MF204D	7	(Japan) Nirei Fukuzumi	All
HFDP Racing	Dallara F312	Mugen-Honda MF204D	8	(Japan) Tsubasa Takahashi	All
RSS with B-Max Racing Team	Dallara F312	Toyota TOM'S TAZ31	13	(Japan) Motoyoshi Yoshida	1–5
B-Max Racing Team with NDDP	Dallara F312	Toyota TOM'S TAZ31	22	(Spain) Lucas Ordóñez	1–3, 5–8
B-Max Racing Team with NDDP	Dallara F312	Toyota TOM'S TAZ31	22	(Japan) Daiki Sasaki	4
B-Max Racing Team with NDDP	Dallara F315	Toyota TOM'S TAZ31	23	(Japan) Mitsunori Takaboshi	All
B-Max Racing Team	Dallara F312	Toyota TOM'S TAZ31	50	(Japan) Katsumasa Chiyo	6
B-Max Racing Team	Dallara F312	Toyota TOM'S TAZ31	50	(Japan) Yuhi Sekiguchi	7–8
KCMG	Dallara F312	Toyota TOM'S TAZ31	19	(United Kingdom) Struan Moore	All
Tairoku Hanashima Racing	Dallara F312	Toyota TOM'S TAZ31	28	(Japan) Tairoku Yamaguchi	All
Petronas Team TOM'S	Dallara F312	Toyota TOM'S TAZ31	36	(Japan) Kenta Yamashita	All
Petronas Team TOM'S	Dallara F314	Toyota TOM'S TAZ31	37	(New Zealand) Nick Cassidy	All
National Class
Exedy Racing Team	Dallara F307	Toyota TOM'S 3S-GE	3	(Japan) Ai Miura	All
KRC Hanashima Racing	Dallara F306	Toyota TOM'S 3S-GE	5	(China) Alex Yang	All
RSS with B-Max Racing Team	Dallara F306	Toyota TOM'S 3S-GE	13	(Japan) Motoyoshi Yoshida	6
B-Max Racing Team	Dallara F308	Toyota TOM'S 3S-GE	30	(Japan) "Dragon"	All
FSC Motorsport	Dallara F307	Toyota TOM'S 3S-GE	18	(France) Guillaume Cunnington	1–3, 6–8
TOM'S	Dallara F306	Toyota TOM'S 3S-GE	38	(Japan) Ryo Ogawa	All
CMS	Dallara F306	Toyota TOM'S 3S-GE	77	(Japan) Masaru Miura	All

== Race calendar and results ==
A provisional calendar for the 2015 season. All races are scheduled to be held in Japan.

Round		Circuit	Date	Pole position	Fastest lap	Winning driver	Winning team	National winner	Supporting
1	R1	Suzuka Circuit	18 April	(New Zealand) Nick Cassidy	(New Zealand) Nick Cassidy	(Japan) Mitsunori Takaboshi	B-Max Racing Team with NDDP	(Japan) Ai Miura	Super Formula
1	R2	Suzuka Circuit	19 April	(New Zealand) Nick Cassidy	(New Zealand) Nick Cassidy	(New Zealand) Nick Cassidy	Petronas Team TOM'S	(Japan) Ryo Ogawa	Super Formula
2	R1	Twin Ring Motegi	9 May	(Japan) Kenta Yamashita	(Japan) Mitsunori Takaboshi	(New Zealand) Nick Cassidy	Petronas Team TOM'S	(Japan) Ai Miura	
2	R2	Twin Ring Motegi	10 May	(Japan) Kenta Yamashita	(Japan) Mitsunori Takaboshi	(Japan) Kenta Yamashita	Petronas Team TOM'S	(Japan) Ryo Ogawa	
2	R3	Twin Ring Motegi	10 May		(Japan) Kenta Yamashita	(Japan) Kenta Yamashita	Petronas Team TOM'S	(Japan) Ryo Ogawa	
3	R1	Okayama International Circuit	23 May	(New Zealand) Nick Cassidy	(New Zealand) Nick Cassidy	(New Zealand) Nick Cassidy	Petronas Team TOM'S	(Japan) Ryo Ogawa	Super Formula
3	R2	Okayama International Circuit	24 May	(Japan) Kenta Yamashita	(Japan) Kenta Yamashita	(Japan) Kenta Yamashita	Petronas Team TOM'S	(Japan) Ryo Ogawa	Super Formula
4	R1	Fuji Speedway	6 June	(Japan) Nirei Fukuzumi	(New Zealand) Nick Cassidy	(Japan) Kenta Yamashita	Petronas Team TOM'S	(Japan) Ryo Ogawa	The One–Make Race Festival
4	R2	Fuji Speedway	7 June	(New Zealand) Nick Cassidy	(Japan) Kenta Yamashita	(New Zealand) Nick Cassidy	Petronas Team TOM'S	(Japan) Ryo Ogawa	The One–Make Race Festival
5	R1	Okayama International Circuit	27 June	(Japan) Kenta Yamashita	(Japan) Kenta Yamashita	(Japan) Mitsunori Takaboshi	B-Max Racing Team with NDDP	(Japan) Ai Miura	GT Asia Series
5	R2	Okayama International Circuit	28 June	(Japan) Kenta Yamashita	(Japan) Kenta Yamashita	(Japan) Mitsunori Takaboshi	B-Max Racing Team with NDDP	(Japan) Ryo Ogawa	GT Asia Series
6	R1	Fuji Speedway	18 July	(New Zealand) Nick Cassidy	(Japan) Nirei Fukuzumi	(New Zealand) Nick Cassidy	Petronas Team TOM'S	(Japan) Ryo Ogawa	Super Formula
6	R2	Fuji Speedway	19 July	(Japan) Mitsunori Takaboshi	(New Zealand) Nick Cassidy	(Japan) Kenta Yamashita	Petronas Team TOM'S	(Japan) Ryo Ogawa	Super Formula
7	R1	Twin Ring Motegi	22 August	(Japan) Nirei Fukuzumi	(Japan) Nirei Fukuzumi	(Japan) Nirei Fukuzumi	HFDP Racing	(Japan) Ryo Ogawa	Super Formula
7	R2	Twin Ring Motegi	23 August	(Japan) Nirei Fukuzumi	(Japan) Nirei Fukuzumi	(Japan) Nirei Fukuzumi	HFDP Racing	(Japan) Ryo Ogawa	Super Formula
8	R1	Sportsland SUGO	17 October	(New Zealand) Nick Cassidy	(New Zealand) Nick Cassidy	(New Zealand) Nick Cassidy	Petronas Team TOM'S	(Japan) Ryo Ogawa	Super Formula
8	R2	Sportsland SUGO	18 October	(New Zealand) Nick Cassidy	(New Zealand) Nick Cassidy	(New Zealand) Nick Cassidy	Petronas Team TOM'S	(Japan) Ryo Ogawa	Super Formula

== Championship standings ==
=== Drivers' Championships ===
- Points are awarded as follows:

1	2	3	4	5	6	PP	FL
10	7	5	3	2	1	**1**	1

==== Overall ====
Pos	Driver	SUZ		MOT1			OKA1		FUJ1		OKA2		FUJ2		MOT2		SUG		Points
1	(New Zealand) Nick Cassidy	**10**	**1**	1	3	3	**1**	2	2	**1**	5	4	**1**	2	2	5	**1**	**1**	129
2	(Japan) Kenta Yamashita	16	3	**2**	**1**	1	8	**1**	1	3	**2**	**2**	5	1	3	2	4	3	113
3	(Japan) Mitsunori Takaboshi	1	2	3	2	4	3	3	3	2	1	1	3	**Ret**	4	3	5	8	92
4	(Japan) Nirei Fukuzumi	5	7	4	4	2	7	5	**5**	4	4	5	2	3	**1**	**1**	3	5	72
5	(Spain) Lucas Ordóñez	4	5	6	6	6	2	4			3	3	9	6	9	Ret	2	2	43
6	(Japan) Tsubasa Takahashi	3	4	5	5	5	5	6	7	8	9	8	4	Ret	8	6	8	6	22
7	(Japan) Keishi Ishikawa	2	6	8	8	7	13	Ret	6	6	6	6	8	7	6	4	6	4	20
8	(United Kingdom) Struan Moore	6	8	7	7	8	4	7	8	7	7	7	7	5	7	7	9	7	6
9	(Japan) Daiki Sasaki								4	5									5
10	(Japan) Katsumasa Chiyo												6	4					4
11	(Japan) Yuhi Sekiguchi														5	Ret	7	9	2
12	(Japan) Tairoku Yamaguchi	7	9	9	9	9	6	8	9	9	8	9	10	8	10	8	10	12	1
13	(Japan) Ai Miura	8	11	10	11	11	Ret	10	11	11	10	11	12	10	12	10	12	11	0
14	(Japan) Ryo Ogawa	9	10	11	10	10	9	9	10	10	11	10	11	9	11	9	11	10	0
15	(China) Alex Yang	13	15	Ret	14	14	10	13	Ret	15	15	Ret	14	13	Ret	12	Ret	15	0
16	(Japan) "Dragon"	11	12	12	12	12	Ret	11	12	12	12	12	13	11	13	11	13	13	0
17	(Japan) Motoyoshi Yoshida	12	14	14	Ret	Ret	11	12	13	13	14	14	17	14					0
18	(Japan) Masaru Miura	14	13	13	13	13	12	Ret	14	14	13	13	15	12	14	13	14	Ret	0
19	(France) Guillaume Cunnington	15	16	15	15	Ret	WD	WD					16	15	NC	Ret	15	14	0
Pos	Driver	SUZ		MOT1			OKA1		FUJ1		OKA2		FUJ2		MOT2		SUG		Points

Colour	Result
Gold	Winner
Silver	Second place
Bronze	Third place
Green	Points classification
Blue	Non-points classification
Blue	Non-classified finish (NC)
Purple	Retired, not classified (Ret)
Red	Did not qualify (DNQ)
Red	Did not pre-qualify (DNPQ)
Black	Disqualified (DSQ)
White	Did not start (DNS)
White	Withdrew (WD)
White	Race cancelled (C)
Blank	Did not practice (DNP)
Blank	Did not arrive (DNA)
Blank	Excluded (EX)

**Bold** – Pole
Italics – Fastest Lap

==== National Class ====
Pos	Driver	SUZ		MOT1			OKA1		FUJ1		OKA2		FUJ2		MOT2		SUG	Points
1	(Japan) Ryo Ogawa	**9**	10	**11**	**10**	10	**9**	**9**	10	**10**	**11**	**10**	**11**	**9**	**11**	**9**		168
2	(Japan) Ai Miura	8	**11**	10	11	**11**	Ret	10	**11**	11	10	11	12	10	12	10		109
3	(Japan) "Dragon"	11	12	12	12	12	Ret	11	12	12	12	12	13	11	13	11		70
4	(Japan) Masaru Miura	14	13	13	13	13	12	Ret	14	14	13	13	15	12	14	13		41
5	(China) Alex Yang	13	15	Ret	14	14	10	13	Ret	15	15	Ret	14	13	Ret	12		31
6	(France) Guillaume Cunnington	15	16	15	15	Ret	WD	WD					16	15	NC	Ret		6
7	(Japan) Motoyoshi Yoshida												17	14				1
Pos	Driver	SUZ		MOT1			OKA1		FUJ1		OKA2		FUJ2		MOT2		SUG	Points

=== Teams' Championship ===
- Points are awarded as follows:

1	2	3	4	5	6
10	7	5	3	2	1

Pos	Tuner	SUZ		MOT1			OKA1		FUJ1		OKA2		FUJ2		MOT2		SUG	Points
1	Petronas Team TOM'S	10	1	1	1	1	1	1	1	1	2	2	1	1	2	2		128
2	B-Max Racing Team with NDDP	1	2	3	2	4	2	3	3	2	1	1	3	6	4	3		90
3	HFDP Racing	3	4	4	4	2	5	5	5	4	4	5	2	3	1	1		67
4	Toda Racing	2	6	8	8	7	13	Ret	6	6	6	6	8	7	6	4		16
5	KCMG	6	8	7	7	8	4	7	8	7	7	7	7	5	7	7		6
6	B-Max Racing Team	11	12	12	12	12	Ret	11	12	12	12	12	6	4	5	11		6
7	Tairoku Hanashima Racing	7	9	9	9	9	6	8	9	9	8	9	10	8	10	8		1
NC	Exedy Racing Team	8	11	10	11	11	Ret	10	11	11	10	11	12	10	12	10		0
NC	TOM'S	9	10	11	10	10	9	9	10	10	11	10	11	9	11	9		0
NC	KRC Hanashima Racing	13	15	Ret	14	14	10	13	Ret	15	15	Ret	14	13	Ret	12		0
NC	RSS with B-Max Racing Team	12	14	14	Ret	Ret	11	12	13	13	14	14	17	14				0
NC	CMS	14	13	13	13	13	12	Ret	14	14	13	13	15	12	14	13		0
NC	FSC Motorsport	15	16	15	15	Ret	WD	WD					16	15	NC	Ret		0
Pos	Driver	SUZ		MOT1			OKA1		FUJ1		OKA2		FUJ2		MOT2		SUG	Points

=== Engine Tuners' Championship ===
Pos	Tuner	SUZ		MOT1			OKA1		FUJ1		OKA2		FUJ2		MOT2		SUG	Points
1	TOM'S	1	1	1	1	1	1	1	1	1	1	1	1	1	2	2		144
2	M-TEC	3	4	4	4	2	5	5	5	4	4	5	2	3	1	1		67
3	Toda Racing	2	6	8	8	7	13	Ret	6	6	6	6	8	7	6	4		16
Pos	Tuner	SUZ		MOT1			OKA1		FUJ1		OKA2		FUJ2		MOT2		SUG	Points
