= Pu Junjin =

Chinese racing driver (born 1984)

Kevin Pu Junjin
- Nationality: (China) Chinese
- Born: 17 June 1984 (age 42) Foshan, China

TCR Asia Series career
- Debut season: 2015
- Current team: Asia Racing Team
- Categorisation: FIA Bronze
- Car number: 69
- Starts: 2

Previous series
- 2015 2014-15 2013-14 2013-14 2012 2011: European Le Mans Series; Asian Formula Renault Series; Formula Masters China; Asian Le Mans Series; Volkswagen Scirocco R Cup China; Karting

"Kevin" Pu Junjin (Chinese: 蒲俊錦; pinyin: Pú Jùnjǐn; born 17 June 1984) is a Chinese racing driver currently competing in the TCR Asia Series. Having previously competed in the Asian Formula Renault Series, Asian Le Mans Series and European Le Mans Series amongst others.

== Racing career ==
Pu began his career in 2011 in karting. In 2012, he switched to the Volkswagen Scirocco R Cup China. He raced in the Formula Masters China championship from 2013–14, at the same time he also competed in the Asian Le Mans Series finishing second in the LMP2 championship standings in 2014. In 2014, he also in raced in the Asian Formula Renault Series, he finished the season fourth in the championship standings. In 2015, he switched to the European Le Mans Series finishing tenth in the championship standings that year.

In October 2015, it was announced that Pu would race in the TCR Asia Series & TCR International Series, driving a SEAT León Cup Racer for Asia Racing Team.

== Racing record ==
=== Complete European Le Mans Series results ===
(key) (Races in bold indicate pole position) (Races in italics indicate fastest lap)

| Year | Entrant | Class | Chassis | Engine | 1 | 2 | 3 | 4 | 5 | Rank | Points |
|---|---|---|---|---|---|---|---|---|---|---|---|
| 2015 | Eurasia Motorsport | LMP2 | Oreca 03R | Nissan VK45DE 4.5L V8 | SIL; 5 | IMO; 7 | RBR; 8 | LEC | EST; 6 | 9th | 28 |

=== Complete TCR International Series results ===
(key) (Races in bold indicate pole position) (Races in italics indicate fastest lap)

| Year | Team | Car | 1 | 2 | 3 | 4 | 5 | 6 | 7 | 8 | 9 | 10 | 11 | 12 | 13 | 14 | 15 | 16 | 17 | 18 | 19 | 20 | 21 | 22 | DC | Points |
|---|---|---|---|---|---|---|---|---|---|---|---|---|---|---|---|---|---|---|---|---|---|---|---|---|---|---|
| 2015 | Asia Racing Team | SEAT León Cup Racer | MYS; 1 | MYS; 2 | CHN; 1 | CHN; 2 | ESP; 1 | ESP; 2 | POR; 1 | POR; 2 | ITA; 1 | ITA; 2 | AUT; 1 | AUT; 2 | RUS; 1 | RUS; 2 | RBR; 1 | RBR; 2 | SIN; 1 | SIN; 2 | THA; 1; 13 | THA; 2; 11 | MAC; 1 | MAC; 2 | NC | 0 |

=== 24 Hours of Le Mans results ===
| Year | Team | Co-Drivers | Car | Class | Laps | Pos. | Class Pos. |
|---|---|---|---|---|---|---|---|
| 2016 | (Philippines) Eurasia Motorsport | (Netherlands) Nick de Bruijn (France) Tristan Gommendy | Oreca 05-Nissan | LMP2 | 348 | 9th | 5th |
