= 2013 GT Asia Series =

Seasons
- ← 2012 2014 →

The 2013 GT Asia Series season was the fourth season of the GT Asia Series championship. It began on 11 May at Twin Ring Motegi and finished on November 17 at the Guia Circuit after eleven races.

== Race calendar and results ==
| Round | Circuit | Date | Pole position | GT3 Winner | GTM Winner |
|---|---|---|---|---|---|
| 1 | (Japan) Twin Ring Motegi | 11 May | #007 Craft Racing | #2 Asia Racing Team | #16 Wayne Shen |
| 1 | (Japan) Twin Ring Motegi | 11 May | (Germany) Stefan Mücke (Hong Kong) Frank Yu | (China) Zhi Cong Li | (Canada) Wayne Shen |
| 2 | (Japan) Twin Ring Motegi | 12 May | #1 Clearwater Racing | #007 Craft Racing | #70 Age Age Racing |
| 2 | (Japan) Twin Ring Motegi | 12 May | (Singapore) Weng Sun Mok | (Germany) Stefan Mücke (Hong Kong) Frank Yu | (Japan) Naoryu (Japan) Tojiro Azuma |
| 3 | (Japan) Okayama International Circuit | 29 June | #007 Craft Racing | #007 Craft Racing | #70 Age Age Racing |
| 3 | (Japan) Okayama International Circuit | 29 June | (Germany) Stefan Mücke (Hong Kong) Frank Yu | (Germany) Stefan Mücke (Hong Kong) Frank Yu | (Japan) Naoryu (Japan) Tojiro Azuma |
| 4 | (Japan) Okayama International Circuit | 30 June | #1 Clearwater Racing | #007 Craft Racing | #70 Age Age Racing |
| 4 | (Japan) Okayama International Circuit | 30 June | (Japan) Hiroshi Hamaguchi (Singapore) Weng Sun Mok | (Germany) Stefan Mücke (Hong Kong) Frank Yu | (Japan) Naoryu (Japan) Tojiro Azuma |
| 5 | (Japan) Fuji Speedway | 13 July | #007 Craft Racing | #1 Clearwater Racing | #21 Francis Tjia |
| 5 | (Japan) Fuji Speedway | 13 July | (Germany) Stefan Mücke (Hong Kong) Frank Yu | (Japan) Hiroshi Hamaguchi (Singapore) Weng Sun Mok | (Netherlands) Francis Tjia |
| 6 | (Japan) Fuji Speedway | 14 July | #91 Team AAI-Rstrada | #7 Team R8 LMS ultra | #16 Wayne Shen |
| 6 | (Japan) Fuji Speedway | 14 July | (Japan) Akira Iida | (Taiwan) Jeffrey Lee (Hong Kong) Marchy Lee | (Canada) Wayne Shen |
| 7 | (Malaysia) Sepang International Circuit | 14 September | #007 Craft Racing | #83 AF Corse | #16 Wayne Shen |
| 7 | (Malaysia) Sepang International Circuit | 14 September | (Hong Kong) Darryl O'Young (Hong Kong) Frank Yu | (Thailand) Pasin Lathouras | (Canada) Wayne Shen |
| 8 | (Malaysia) Sepang International Circuit | 15 September | #2 Asia Racing Team | #83 AF Corse | #77 Tiger Racing Team |
| 8 | (Malaysia) Sepang International Circuit | 15 September | (China) Zhi Cong Li | (Thailand) Pasin Lathouras | (Netherlands) Carlo van Dam (Hong Kong) Jacky Yeung |
| 9 | (China) Zhuhai International Circuit | 12 October | #2 Asia Racing Team | #36 Erebus Motorsport | None |
| 9 | (China) Zhuhai International Circuit | 12 October | (China) Zhi Cong Li | (Finland) Mika Häkkinen (Hong Kong) Matthew Solomon | None |
| 10 | (China) Zhuhai International Circuit | 13 October | #63 Erebus Motorsport | #2 Asia Racing Team | None |
| 10 | (China) Zhuhai International Circuit | 13 October | (Germany) Lance David Arnold | (China) Zhi Cong Li | None |
| 11 | (Macau) Guia Circuit | 17 November | #36 Erebus Motorsport | #1 Audi R8 LMS Cup | #16 Wayne Shen |
| 11 | (Macau) Guia Circuit | 17 November | (Germany) Maro Engel | (Italy) Edoardo Mortara | (Canada) Wayne Shen |

== Championships ==
Points were awarded as follows:

| Position | 1st | 2nd | 3rd | 4th | 5th | 6th | 7th | 8th | 9th | 10th | 11th | 12th | Pole |
| Points | 18 | 16 | 14 | 10 | 9 | 8 | 7 | 6 | 5 | 4 | 2 | 1 | 1 |

=== Drivers Championship ===
Only the best 9 results counted for the drivers championship
