= 2020 Formula Renault AsiaCup =

Cancelled motor racing competition

The 2020 Formula Renault AsiaCup was a planned multi-event motor racing championship for open wheel, formula racing cars held across Asia. The championship would see drivers competing in Tatuus-F3R-spec cars with FR-19 Renault engines. The 2020 season would have been the inaugural season of the championship, following the rebranding of the Asian Formula Renault Series to align with the Formula Renault Eurocup. The season was cancelled in November 2020 due to customs restrictions in China because of the COVID-19 pandemic.

== Planned calendar ==
The first calendar was announced on 23 December 2019. Due to the COVID-19 pandemic, a revised calendar was announced on 19 February 2020. This calendar was amended even further on 21 May 2020, and then again on 16 June 2020, which left the series with two events at Zhuhai International Circuit. In November 2020, the season was abandoned.

Round		Circuit	Date
1	R1	(China) Zhuhai International Circuit	17–18 October
1	R2	(China) Zhuhai International Circuit	17–18 October
2	R3	(China) Zhuhai International Circuit	12–13 December
2	R4	(China) Zhuhai International Circuit	12–13 December
