= Jim Chong Shing =

Hong Kong street car racer (born 1957)

Jim Chong Shing (詹昌盛; born 13 August 1957), an infamous Hong Kong street car racer nicknamed "Mang Hang" (盲亨, blind tycoon) and a member of "Wo On Lok" (和安樂), also known as "Shui Fong", one of the Hong Kong Triads. He is known by the local press as the 'God of Racing'.

Jim Chong Shing's son is Jim Ka To, a formula car racer and the 2008 Asian Formula Renault champion.

Jim's 15-year-old daughter was found dead in December 2016 in Tsuen Wan Pier waters.

== In popular culture ==
In the 2012 Hong Kong action film Motorway, the character Sun, a triad street racer is loosely based on the life events of Jim.
