= GT Asia Series =

Sports car racing series in Asia

- Category: Grand tourer
- Country: Asia
- Inaugural season: 2010
- Folded: 2017
- Tyre suppliers: Michelin
- Official website: Official website

The GT Asia Series was a sports car racing series based in Asia. The championship combines FIA GT3 specification cars as the elite class of the series with Ferrari Challenge, Porsche Cup and older GT3 machinery competing in the GTM class.

The series had its first season in 2010 with a dozen GT3 cars and has since expanded with grid sizes of 26 or more cars and a 13-round calendar visiting tracks in China, Malaysia, Japan and Thailand.

The Series is organized by Motorsport Asia Ltd, creators of the Asian Festival of Speed (AFOS) and sanctioned by the FIA.

In October 2016, the GT Asia Series announced a partnership with the Asian Le Mans Series. It includes a new Michelin Asia GT Challenge, which is a combined classification for GT3 teams, where the winner will get an invitation to the 24 Hours of Le Mans.

In April 2017, the GT Asia Series was announced to merge with the China GT Championship; see GT World Challenge Asia.

== Champions ==
Season	Driver Champion	Team/Entrant Champion	Car
2010	(Sri Lanka) Dilantha Malagamuwa	(Sri Lanka) Dilango Racing	Lamborghini Gallardo LP560 GT3
2011	GT3: (Singapore) Weng Sun Mok; GTM: (Hong Kong) Yung Luk Siu; GT4: (Hong Kong) Nigei Farmer; CS: (Japan) Naoki Furuya	GT3: (Singapore) Team Clearwater Racing; GTM: LKM Racing; GT4: ? CS: ?	GT3: Ferrari 458 Italia GT3; GTM: Lamborghini Gallardo LP560; GT4: ? CS: ?
2012	GT3: (Singapore) Weng Sun Mok; GTM: (Japan) Hisamori Hayashi	GT3: (Singapore) Team Clearwater Racing; GTM: ?	GT3: Ferrari 458 Italia GT3; GTM: ?
2013	GT3: (China) Li Zhi Cong; GTM: ?	GT3: (China) Asia Racing Team; GTM: ?	GT3: Porsche 911 GT3-R; GTM: ?
2014	GT3: (Singapore) Weng Sun Mok; GTM: (Hong Kong) Jacky Yeung	GT3: (Singapore) Clearwater Racing; GTM: Tiger Racing Team	GT3: Ferrari 458 Italia GT3; GTM: Audi R8 LMS
2015	GT3: (Hong Kong) Darryl O'Young; GTM: (Hong Kong) Jerry Wang	GT3: (Hong Kong) Craft-Bamboo Racing; GTM: (Hong Kong) Absolute Racing	GT3: Aston Martin Vantage GT3; GTM: Audi R8 LMS Cup
2016	GT3: (Italy) Edoardo Liberati (Italy) Andrea Amici; GTM: (Sri Lanka) Dilantha Malagamuwa; GTC: (Thailand) Kantasak Kusiri; Pro-Cup: (Italy) Edoardo Liberati (Italy) Andrea Amici; Pro-Am Cup: (Hong Kong) Shaun Thong; Am-Cup: (Singapore) Weng Sun Mok	GT3: (Hong Kong) Bentley Team Absolute; GTM: (Sri Lanka) Dilango Racing; GTC: (Thailand) Singha Plan-B Motorsport	GT3: Bentley Continental GT3; GTM: Lamborghini Gallardo FL2; GTC: Ferrari 458 Challenge
