= 2021 Formula Regional Asia Series =

Motor racing competition

The 2021 Formula Regional Asia Series by Alpine was to be a multi-event, Formula 3 open-wheel single seater motor racing championship held across Asia. After the series planned to rebrand as the Formula Regional AsiaCup in 2020 to align with the Formula Renault Eurocup and that season was abandoned because of the COVID-19 pandemic, another rebrand was scheduled to once again follow the European counterpart now being known as Formula Regional European Championship. The season was abandoned in late November.

== Planned calendar ==
The first calendar was announced on 21 December 2020. However, lack of news regarding the season opener as well as other series reporting of no regional racing activity in Asia put the holding of the championship in doubt. The first race weekend, planned to be held at Ningbo International Circuit, did not take place. After the Chinese government suspended all motorsport activity until further notice, all events in China until September were also cancelled. Two planned events at Sepang and one event at Zhuhai were abandoned without further communication.

Plans to relaunch the series in late 2021 did ultimately not come to fruition, and the season was abandoned in late November.
