= Asia Racing Team =

Racing team

(Macau) Asia Racing Team
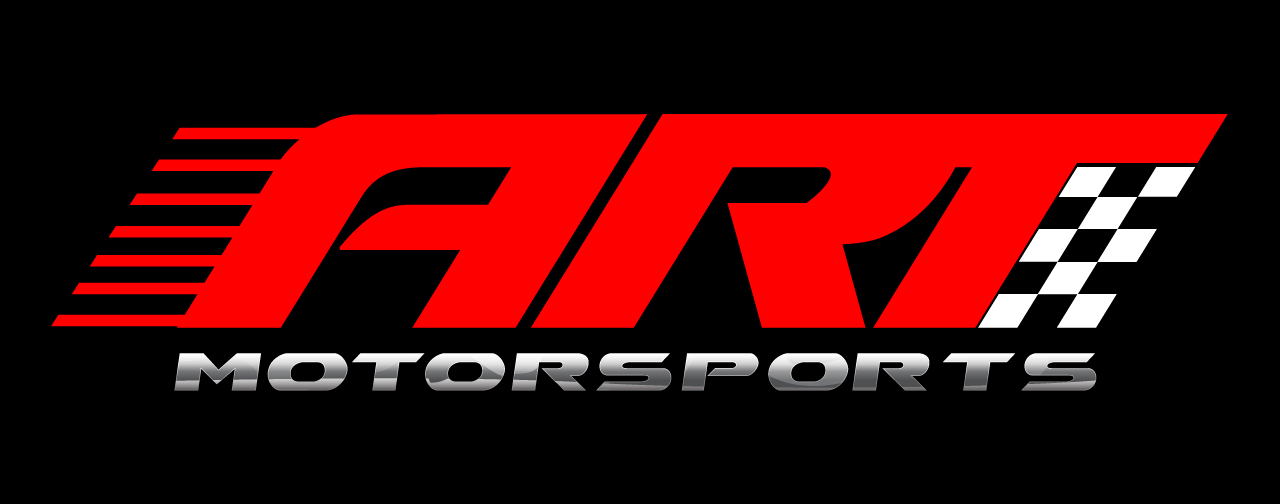
- Founded: 2003
- Base: Zhuhai International Circuit, Guangdong Province, People's Republic of China
- Team principal(s): Philippe Descombes (Team Manager); Rodolfo Ávila (Team Manager); Yannick Mazier (Chief Mechanic)
- Teams' Championships: Asian Formula Renault Challenge; 2003 2006 2009 2010; GT Asia Series; 2013: GT3; 2015 TCR Asia Series; 2015
- Drivers' Championships: Asian Formula Renault Challenge; 2010: Sandy Nicholas Stuvik; GT Asia Series; 2013 GT3: Li Zhi Cong
- Website: ART-Motorsports.com

Asia Racing Team (also known as ART Motorsports) is a Chinese-Macanese motor racing team that was formed in 2003. Its main operational headquarters are located within the Zhuhai International Circuit complex in Southern China, with a second workshop in Zhaoqing's Guangdong International Circuit.

The organization business operation includes an auto racing team, the organization of a racing school, corporate track days and promotional events.

The racing team has competed in a number of high-profile championships including the Asian Formula Renault Series, Formula Asia 2.0, Formula Pilota China, Formula BMW Pacific, Porsche Carrera Cup Asia, Malaysian Super Series, GT Asia Series and TCR Asia Series.

== Team management ==
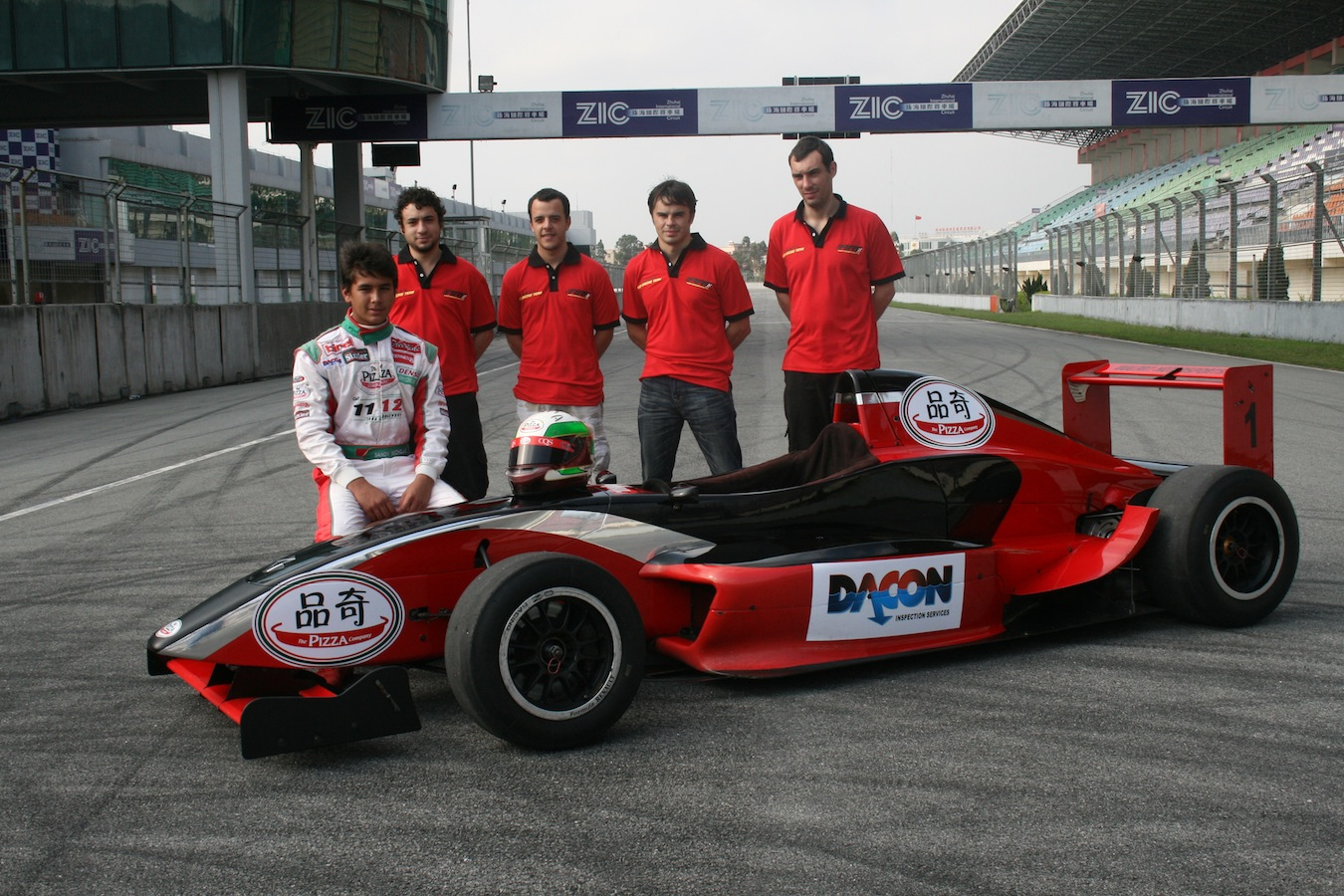
ART management with racing driver Sandy Stuvik.

Philippe Descombes (Team Manager) The overall operation of the company is managed by motor racing multi-titlist Frenchman, Philippe Descombes. He, who is fluent in Mandarin, was the man to help the launch single seaters careers of several successful Asian drivers, including Cheng Congfu, Ma Qinghua, Rodolfo Ávila, Mathias Beche, Alexandre Imperatori, Jazeman Jaafar, or Rio Haryanto.

Yannick Mazier (Chief Mechanic) Frenchman Yannick Mazier is with ART since the first day and leads a 12-man mechanics in the workshop based at Zhuhai International Circuit.

== History ==
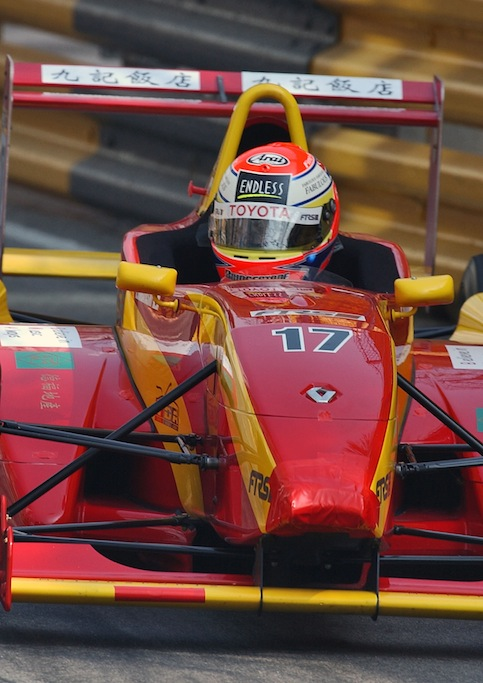
Kazuki Nakajima former F1 driver racing with ART in Macau Grand Prix 2003.

The Asia Racing Team, Ltd. (ART Motorsports) is a company registered in China and in Macau with assets amounting to more than RMB 10 million. Its main operational headquarters is located within the Zhuhai International Circuit complex, in southern China.

Team Highlights:

2003: A group of successful Macau entrepreneurs creates ART to compete in Asian Formula Renault Challenge – the first race of the team was the 50th Macau Grand Prix.

2004: First full season of racing in Asian Formula Renault, finishing 2nd (Rodolfo Ávila).

2005: ART wins Asian Formula Renault Macau Grand Prix (Hiroyuki Matsumura).

2006: ART conquers Asian Formula Renault's Teams title for the first time and finishes 2nd (Alexandre Imperatori).

2007: ART finished 2nd (Alexandre Imperatori) again in Asian Formula Renault Challenge.

2008: The team was 2nd (Mathias Beche) in Formula Asia 2.0 and wins Asian Drivers Trophy (Rio Haryanto). ART returns to Macau Grand Prix, making the first appearance in Formula BMW Pacific.

2009: The team entered a new era, giving the first steps into GT racing, participating in Porsche Carrera Cup Asia with two overall victories and best rookie (Rodolfo Ávila). ART took AFR Championship Teams title and drivers’ classification first runner up (Luis Sa Silva). Contested the Formula BMW Pacific Macau Grand Prix and Singapore Grand Prix rounds.

2010: Asia Racing Team clinched the AFR Series' team championship while Sandy Stuvik clinched the Driver points championship, followed by his teammate Tin Sritrai, and the "Asian Drivers Category".

2011: The team run for the first time two Porsche GT3 Cup-R in GT Asia Series and was in competition for the drivers' championship until the last round at Macau. At the same time the red and black squad embarked in another Porsche Carrera Cup Asia season with a line up of three drivers. The year was also marked by the withdrawn of the team from AFR Series at full-time to primarily focus in Formula Pilota China. Asia Racing Team's Luis Sa Silva was vice-champion.

2012: China's Li Zhi Cong is promoted to ART's GT Asia Series squad and manages to be GT Asia Series vice-champion and AAMC GT Challenge Trophy winner at first try. Thomas Chow has sweated to secure the second place in AFR Series - IFC Class.

2013: Li Zhi Cong seals GT Asia Series championship title and repeats AAMC GT Challenge Trophy win. Leo Wong wins AFR Series IFC Class Trophy.

2014: The team repeats the full season participation in Porsche Carrera Cup Asia and AFR Series, winning the first edition of the 2-hour “Circuit Hero – Formula Enduro” and the four rounds of GT series BOSS GP (Li Chao).

2015: The team joins the newly founded TCR Asia Series, conquering the Teams’ Championship and Drivers’ Vice-championship (Rodolfo Avila) and second runner up (Philippe Descombes). At same time the team keeps collecting race wins in AFR Series and FIA Chinese F4, where Liu Kai finished third overall.

== Racing School ==
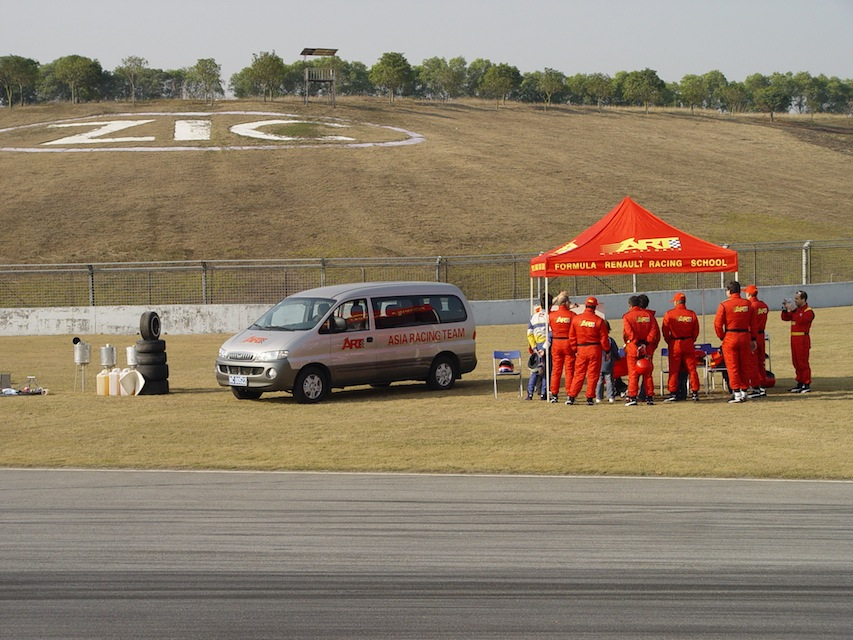
ART Racing School.

The Racing School is the only formal driver training course recognized by both the Hong Kong Automobile Association (HKAA) and the Associação Geral Automóvel Macau-China (AAMC). The organization of a monthly course continues to be popular among the young and elder alike from students to corporate decision-makers.

In 2008 the Racing School introduced the "One-Day Intensive Course", which were designed for racecar beginners and hobbyists, making it possible for both younger and older generations.

In 2016 a low-cost "4-lap Driving Experience" was introduced giving the opportunity to those willing to drive a real single seater racecar at the Zhuhai International Circuit.

ART Motorsports Racing School also owns the only 2-seater single seater in Southeast Asia for promotional activities and racing experiences.

== Formula Pilota China ==
In 2011 Asia Racing Team turned their heads from AFR Series to the newly established single seater championship in the region - the "Formula Pilota China Series" - with an impressive four car line up: China's Chi Cong Li and Naomi Zhang Ran, raced alongside Angola's Luis Sá Silva and Thailand's Tin Sritrai. Sá Silva was vice-champion but the team highlight was the podium swap in Race 1 at Ordos. In 2012 Guangzhou native rookie driver Zou Si Rui was the team's only racer in the championship, claiming two podium finishes at Guangzhou International Circuit.

=== Results ===
Year	Car	Drivers	Races	Wins	Poles	F/Laps	Podiums	Points	D.C.	T.C.
2011	Tatuus FA010	(Angola) Luís Sá Silva	12	2	0	0	3	124	2nd	N/A
2011	Tatuus FA010	(Thailand) Tin Sritrai	12	0	0	0	2	67	5th	N/A
2011	Tatuus FA010	(China) Zhi Cong Li	12	0	0	0	2	67	6th	N/A
2011	Tatuus FA010	(Argentina) Eric Lichtenstein	6	0	0	0	0	10	17th	N/A
2011	Tatuus FA010	(China) Zhang Ran	8	0	0	0	0	3	24th	N/A
2011	Tatuus FA010	(China) Zou Si Rui	2	0	0	0	0	0	26th	N/A
2012	Tatuus FA010	(China) Zou Si Rui	12	0	0	0	2	32	10th	7th

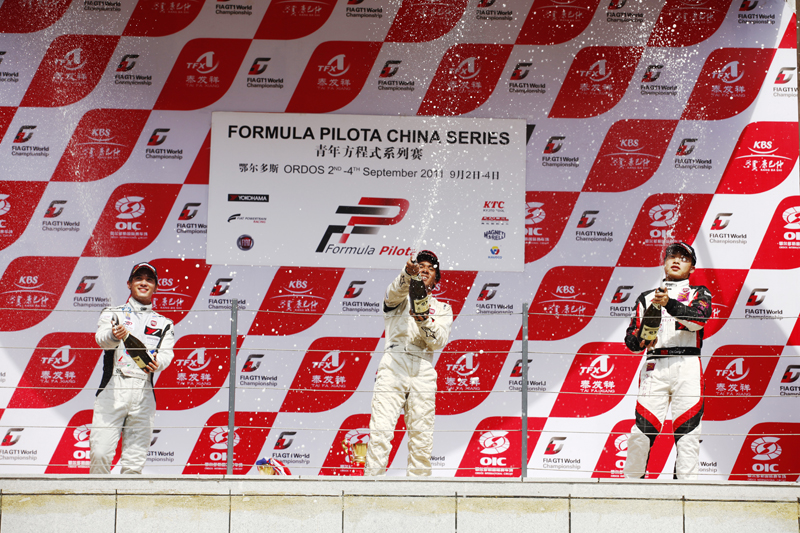
ART dominated in Ordos finishing P1, P2 & P3

== Asian Formula Renault ==
Throughout its history the team primarily competed in Asian Formula Renault Challenge, with past drivers including F1 Championship drivers such as Kamui Kobayashi or Kazuki Nakajima. After several tries, and five vice-champions, including Macau's Rodolfo Avila, Switzerland's Alexandre Imperatori, Mathias Beche and Angola's Luís Sá Silva, Thailand's Sandy Stuvik won the championship for Asia Racing Team in 2010.

In 2011, 2012 and 2013 Asia Racing Team confined its participation to the races in Zhuhai.

In 2015 AFR Series introduced the Formula Renault 2.0/13, and Asia Racing Team assisted Canada's Maxx Ebenal on his way to a double win at the inaugural races at Zhuhai Circuit. In the end of the year the team's best classified driver overall was Indonesia's Darma Hutomo. Teammate James Runacres secured the Class B vice-championship title.

=== Team Drivers ===
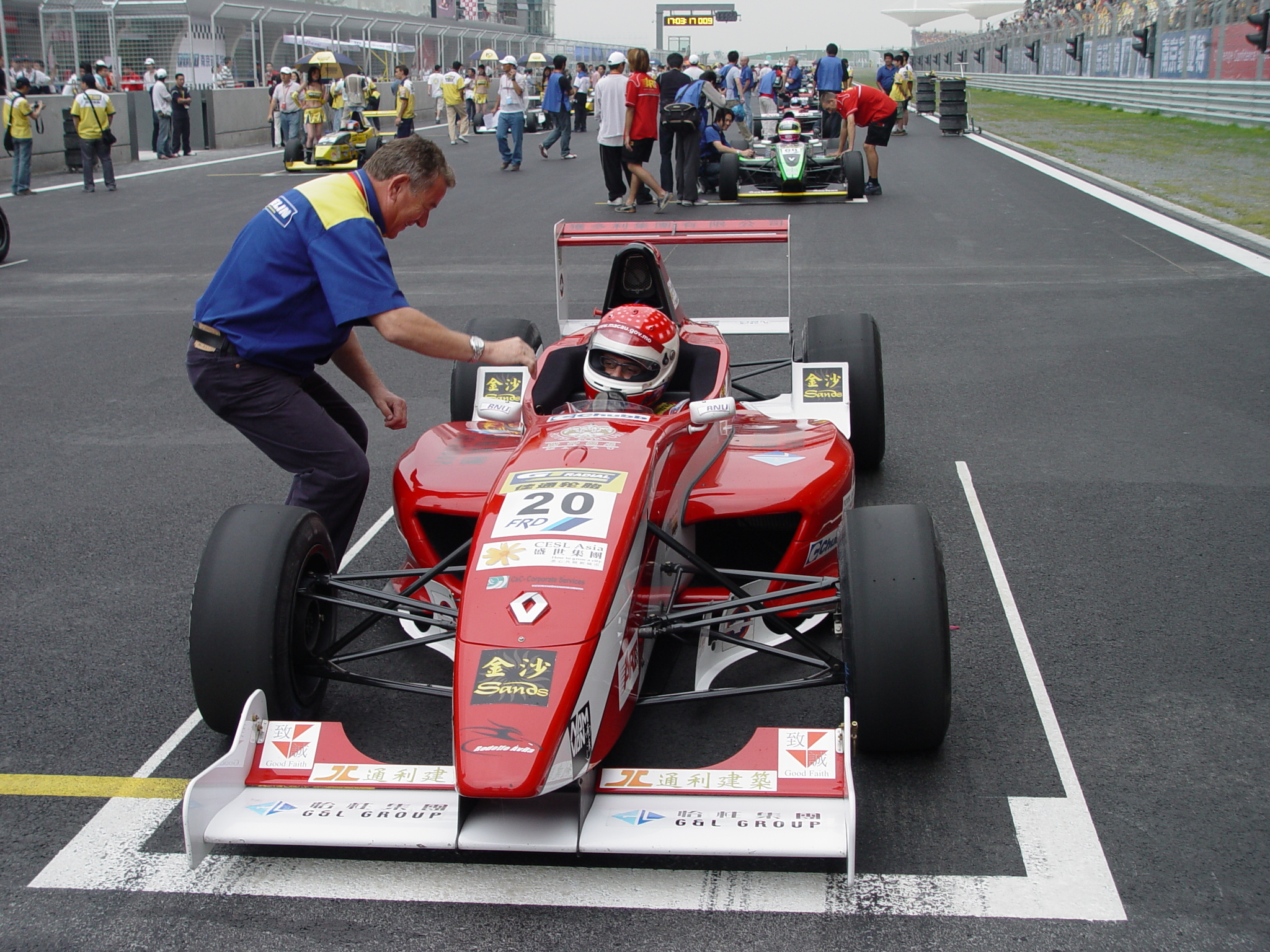
Rodolfo Avila in Pole Position in Shanghai 2004

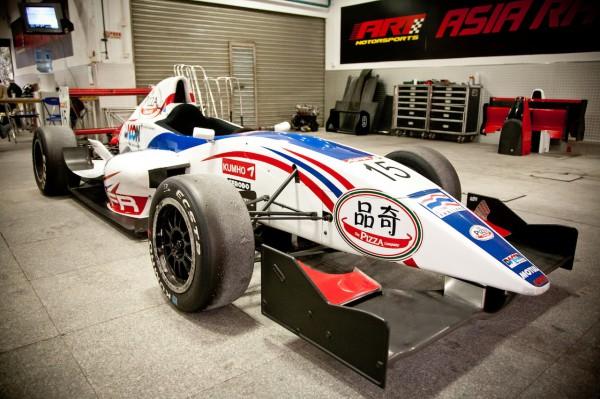
Sandy Stuvik Championship winning car 2010

ART Formula Renault Drivers
Year	Drivers	D.C.	T.C.
2003	(Japan) Kazuki Nakajima†	D.N.F	
2003	(Japan) Kamui Kobayashi	D.N.F	
2003	(Japan) Motohiko Isozaki†	11th	
2004	(Macau) Rodolfo Ávila	2nd	2nd
2004	(Hong Kong) Henry Lee Junior	6th	2nd
2004	(Hong Kong) Kenneth Lau	30th	2nd
2004	(Hong Kong) Michael Choi	16th	2nd
2005	(China) Michael Ting	8th	3rd
2005	(China) Zhang Jin	9th	3rd
2006	(Switzerland) Alexandre Imperatori	2nd	1st
2006	(Malaysia) Jazeman Jaafar	3rd	1st
2006	(Finland) Henri Karjalainen	4th	1st
2006	(China) Zhang Jin	15th	1st
2007	(Switzerland) Alexandre Imperatori	2nd	1st
2007	(France) Benjamin Rouget	13th	1st
2007	(Switzerland) Mathias Beche	5th	1st
2007	(China) Zhang Zhen Dong	17th	1st
2007	(Japan) Sujino Hajime	18th	1st
2008	(Switzerland) Mathias Beche	2nd	2nd
2008	(Japan) Yoshitaka Kuroda	5th	2nd
2008	(Indonesia) Rio Haryanto	3rd	2nd
2008	(United States) Ryan Booth	7th	2nd
2009	(Indonesia) Rio Haryanto	11th	1st
2009	(France) Benjamin Rouget	4th	1st
2009	(Hong Kong) Luca Ferigutti	7th	1st
2009	(Angola) Luís Sá Silva	2nd	1st
2009	(Singapore) Suriya Bala Kerisnan Thevar	20th	1st
2010	(Thailand) Sandy Stuvik	1st	1st
2010	(Thailand) Tin Sritrai	2nd	1st
2010	(Singapore) Suriya Bala Kerisnan Thevar	6th	1st
2010	(China) Zhang Ran	11th	1st
2010	(China) Zhi Cong Li	5th	1st
2011	(China) Zhi Cong Li	8th	4th
2011	(Singapore) Timothy Teo	6th	4th
2011	(Hong Kong) Thomas Chow	19th	4th
2012	(China) Zhi Cong Li	5th	1st
2012	(Hong Kong) Thomas Chow	2nd IFC	1st
2012	(Spain) Guille Pintanel	21st	1st
2012	(China) Yang Xi	13th	1st
2012	(Switzerland) Thomas Lüdi	6th IFC	1st
2012	(Hong Kong) Leo Wong	4th IFC	1st
2012	(Singapore) Timothy Teo	13th IFC	1st
2013	(China) Zhi Cong Li	...	...
2013	(Hong Kong) Thomas Chow	...	...
2013	(Singapore) Kenneth Low	...	...
2013	(China) Yang Xi	...	...
2013	(China) Li Chao	...	...
2013	(Switzerland) Thomas Lüdi	...	...
2013	(Hong Kong) Leo Wong	...	...
2013	(Singapore) Timothy Teo	...	...
2013	(Singapore) Ni Weiliang	...	...
2013	(France) Guillaume Cunnington	...	...
2013	(Hong Kong) Karl Yip	...	...
2013	(Israel) Eitan Zidkilov	...	...
2014	(China) Zhi Cong Li	...	...
2014	(Hong Kong) Thomas Chow	...	...
2014	(China) Pu Jun Jin	...	...
2014	(China) Li Chao	...	...
2014	(Switzerland) Thomas Lüdi	...	...
2014	(Hong Kong) Leo Wong	...	...
2014	(Malaysia) Mitchell Cheah	...	...
2014	(Singapore) Ni Weiliang	...	...
2014	(Indonesia) Darma Hutomo	...	...
2014	(Indonesia) Senna Iriawan	...	...
2015	(Singapore) Ni Weiliang	5th	2nd
2015	(China) Pu Jun Jin	6th	2nd
2015	(Thailand) James Runacres	2nd (Class B)	2nd
2015	(Indonesia) Darma Hutomo	4th	2nd
2015	(Switzerland) Thomas Lüdi	...	2nd
2015	(China) Liu Kai	...	2nd
2015	(Canada) Maxx Ebenal	...	2nd

D.C - Driver Classification, T.C - Team Classification, † - Only one race (Macau Grand Prix)

== Formula BMW Asia Pacific ==
Asia Racing Team's involvement in Formula BMW Pacific was never at full-time. After taking part in Macau Grand Prix 2008, the team would repeat the single event appearances in Singapore and Macau in the following year. In 2010 Asia Racing Team embarked in a half season adventure with Singaporean driver Suriya Bala and decided to enter Toyota Racing Academy drivers Yuichi Nakayama and Ryo Hirakawa in Okayama and Macau rounds. In Japan Nakayama earned the first and only Pole-Position and podium position for the team.

Due to the commitments with the Formula Pilota China in 2011, Asia Racing Team decided to pull out of the series.

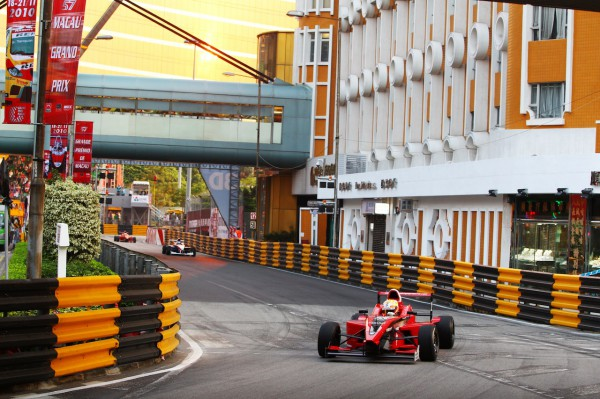
Yuichi Nakayama on the streets of Macau

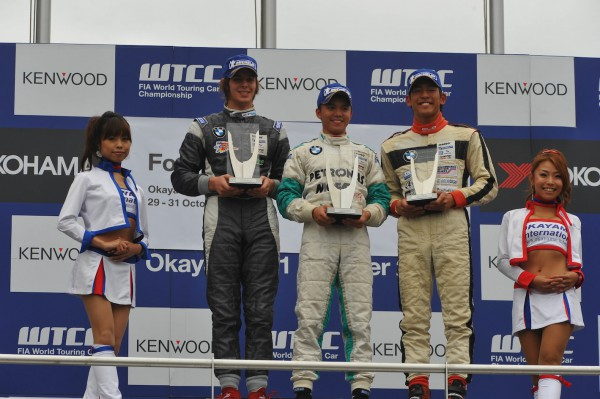
Yuichi Nakayama (Right) at the podium

=== Results ===
Year	Car	Drivers	Races	Wins	Poles	F/Laps	Podiums	Points	D.C.	T.C.
2008	Mygale FB02	(Japan) Yuji Kunimoto	1	0	0	0	0	0	NC	N/A
2008	Mygale FB02	(Israel) Alon Day	1	0	0	0	0	0	NC	N/A
2009	Mygale FB02	(Singapore) Suriya Kerisnan	3	0	0	0	0	0	16th	N/A
2009	Mygale FB02	(Israel) Alon Day	1	0	0	0	0	0	NC	N/A
2010	Mygale FB02	(Singapore) Suriya Kerisnan	6	0	0	0	0	5	17th	9th
2010	Mygale FB02	(Japan) Yuichi Nakayama	3	0	0	1	0	0	NC	9th
2010	Mygale FB02	(Japan) Ryō Hirakawa	3	0	0	0	0	0	NC	9th
2010	Mygale FB02	(China) Zhi Cong Li	1	0	0	0	0	0	NC	9th
2010	Mygale FB02	(Hong Kong) Paul Lau	2	0	0	0	0	0	NC	9th

== Porsche Carrera Cup Asia ==
The team, which has participated in Porsche Carrera Cup Asia in 2009 winning two races, has been keeping an eye on Porsche Carrera Cup Asia in 2010. Following discussions with various drivers, the team has decided to re-enter in the most prestigious series of Southeast Asia as a technical service provider for car owners. Bringing with them a strong racing background as well as a surplus of enthusiasm and excitement, Holland's Marcel Tjia and Hong Kong's Dr Chi Min Ma joined up with Macanese driver Keith Vong to round out the three-car effort. In 2012 Asia Racing Team entered in the series a five-car lineup. Beijing Porsche dealership Betterlife driver Wang Jian Wei third place at Ordos was the team's best result of the season. China's Huang Chu Han won “Class B” races at Sepang and Shanghai.

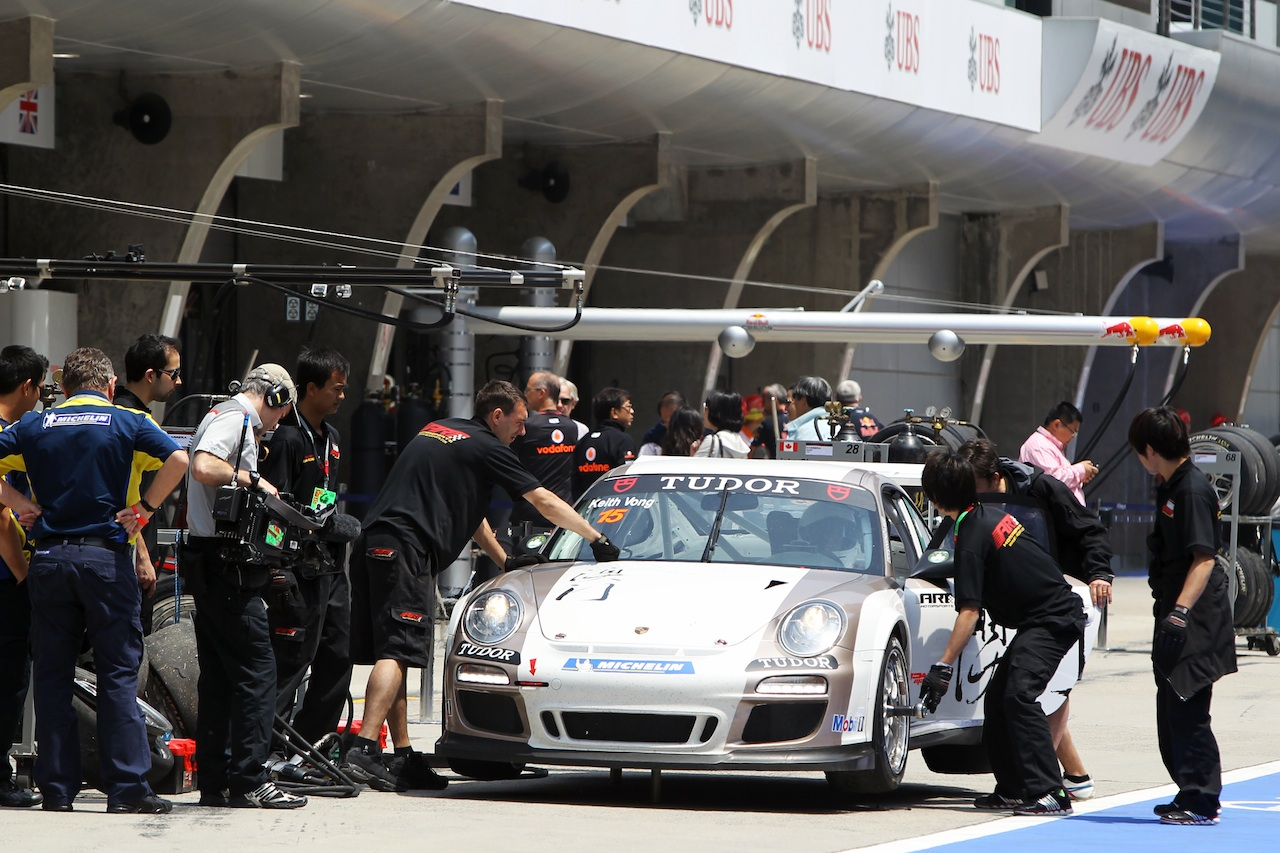
ART driver Keith Wong at the Pitlane during the F1 weekend in Shanghai

=== Team Drivers ===
ART Porsche Carrera Cup Drivers
Year	Drivers	D.C.
2009	(Macau) Rodolfo Ávila	4th
2011	(Hong Kong) Dr.Ma Chi Min	27th
2011	(Macau) Keith Wong	21st
2011	(Netherlands) Marcel Tjia	23rd
2012	(Netherlands) Marcel Tjia	30th
2012	(Canada) Christian Tjia	20th
2012	(China) Wang Jian Wei	9th
2012	(China) Li Chao	23rd
2012	(China) Huang Chu Han	14th
2012	(France) Philippe Descombes	...
2012	(Taiwan) Kevin Chen	30th
2013	(Hong Kong) Jacky Yeung	16th
2013	(Macau) Kevin Tse	...
2013	(China) Wang Jian Wei	9th
2013	(China) Li Chao	23rd
2013	(Germany) Mario Farnbacher	14th
2013	(United Kingdom) Ben Barker	...
2013	(Macau) Rodolfo Ávila	...
2014	(China) Li Chao	15th
2014	(China) Zhang Da Sheng	5th
2015	(China) Li Chao	14th

D.C - Driver Classification

== GT Asia ==
Asia Racing Team expanded to GT series in 2011. The Macau born and Zhuhai based team entered a couple of Porsche 997 GT3 Cup R in the GT3 class of the GT Asia series for the Hong Kong racers Eddie Yau and Sasha Chu. Yau won in Fuji and was a title contender until the last race of the season at Macau where he got involved in a massive crash without injuries for the driver. In 2012 the team returned to the series with a Porsche 911 GT3 R for the young Chinese racer Li Zhi Cong (aka Chi Cong Li). Although Li Zhi Cong was racing GT cars for the first time, he fought for the championship title until the final race and ended the season in second place, winning three races, including GT Asia Series last round at Macau's Circuito da Guia. Hong Kong racer Sasha Chu took part of Fuji and Autopolis events. Li Zhi Cong returned in 2013, taking the championship by storm by winning GT Asia Series season finale at Macau.

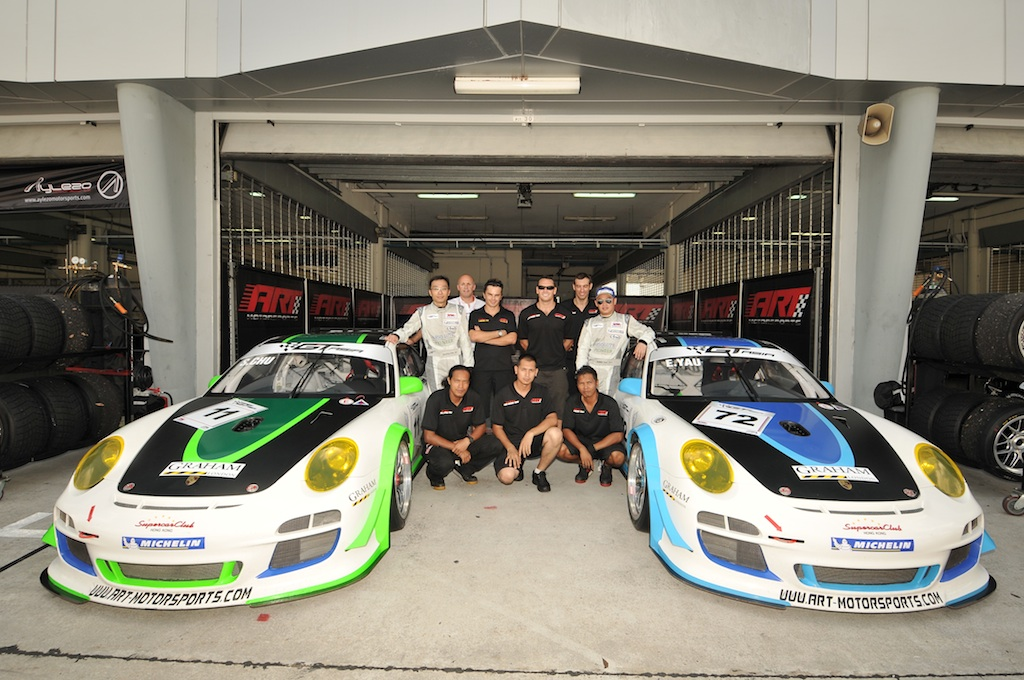
ART crew and drivers

=== Team Drivers ===
ART GT Asia Drivers
Year	Drivers	D.C.	T.C.
2011	(Hong Kong) Eddie Yau	3rd	2nd
2011	(Hong Kong) Sasha Chu	7th	2nd
2012	(China) Zhi Cong Li	2nd	3rd
2012	(Hong Kong) Sasha Chu	33rd	3rd
2012	(Macau) Rodolfo Ávila	...	3rd
2012	(Hong Kong) Keith Chan	...	3rd
2013	(China) Zhi Cong Li	1st	2nd
2014	(China) Li Chao	...	...
2014	(China) Zhang Da Zheng	...	...
2014	(Macau) Rodolfo Ávila	...	...

D.C - Driver Classification, T.C - Team Classification

== TCR Asia Series ==
Asia Racing Team won the inaugural TCR Asia Series teams’ title and capped a winning year with a triple win at the opening round at Sepang and double victory at the season-ending Macau Grand Prix Guia Race.

In nine rounds of series competition, Asia Racing Team's SEAT Léon TCR drivers scored an impressive eleven podium results - including three overall wins for Rodolfo Avila, two for one-time race-returnee Philippe Descombes and one for Thai touring car star Tin Sritrai.

Avila finished second in championship standings and Descombes was third.

=== Results ===
Year	Car	Drivers	Races	Wins	Poles	F/Laps	Podiums	Points	D.C.	T.C.
2015	SEAT León Cup Racer	(Macau) Rodolfo Ávila	3	3	2	3	3	89	2nd	1st
2015	SEAT León Cup Racer	(France) Philippe Descombes	3	2	1	2	3	77	3rd	1st
2015	SEAT León Cup Racer	(Thailand) Tin Sritrai	2	1	0	0	2	47	7th	1st
2015	SEAT León Cup Racer	(China) Pu Jun Jin	2	0	0	0	2	32	13th	1st
2015	SEAT León Cup Racer	(Macau) Liu Lic Ka	2	0	0	0	0	18	15th	1st
2015	SEAT León Cup Racer	(Hong Kong) Sam Lok	0	0	0	0	0	0	NC	1st
2016	SEAT León TCR	(Hong Kong) Edgar Lau	2	0	0	1	0	0	NC	NC

== TCR International Series ==
=== Results ===
Year	Car	Drivers	Races	Wins	Poles	F/Laps	Podiums	Points	D.C.	T.C.
2015	SEAT León Cup Racer	(Macau) Rodolfo Ávila	2	0	0	0	0	10	22nd	8th
2015	SEAT León Cup Racer	(Thailand) Tin Sritrai	2	0	0	0	0	4	32nd	8th
2015	SEAT León Cup Racer	(China) Pu Jun Jin	2	0	0	0	0	0	NC	8th
2015	SEAT León Cup Racer	(Hong Kong) Sam Lok	0	0	0	0	0	0	NC	8th
2016	SEAT León TCR	(Hong Kong) Edgar Lau	2	0	0	1	0	0	NC	NC

== F4 Chinese Championship ==
Asia Racing Team entered in the opening season of the five round FIA Formula 4 China Championship. Beijing's Liu Kai went to the podium for six times, rounding out his campaign with a much deserved race win in the last race of the year at Zhuhai.

Asia Racing Team entered a second car for two occasions: in the first event at Beijing for Hua Miao and in the season finale at Zhuhai for the 15-year old Guangzhou native Charles Lin.

=== Results ===
Year	Car	Drivers	Races	Wins	Poles	F/Laps	Podiums	Points	D.C.	T.C.
2015-16	Mygale M14-F4	(China) Liu Kai	10	1	1	3	7	156	3rd	N/A
2015-16	Mygale M14-F4	(China) Hua Miao	2	0	0	0	0	24	9th	N/A
2015-16	Mygale M14-F4	(China) Lin Taian	2	0	0	0	0	24	10th	N/A
2016	Mygale M14-F4	(United States) Zhu Tianqi	3	0	0	0	0	21	12th	N/A
2016	Mygale M14-F4	(Macau) Hon Chio Leong	6	1	1	1	2	0	NC	N/A
2016	Mygale M14-F4	(China) Daniel Cao	3	0	1	1	2	0	NC	N/A
2016	Mygale M14-F4	(China) Billy Zheng	3	0	0	0	0	0	NC	N/A
2020	Mygale M14-F4	(China) Stephen Hong†	10	1	1	1	2	126	4th	8th
2020	Mygale M14-F4	(China) Pang Changyuan	8	0	0	0	0	23	14th	8th
2020	Mygale M14-F4	(China) Yu Songtao	10	0	0	0	0	13	15th	8th
2021	Mygale M14-F4	(China) Li Sicheng‡	10	0	0	0	4	155	2nd	4th
2021	Mygale M14-F4	(China) Liu Tiezheng	4	0	0	0	0	20	14th	4th
2023	Mygale M14-F4	(China) Pang Changyuan	4	0	0	0	1	37	15th	?
2023	Mygale M14-F4	(Macau) Marcus Cheong	8	0	0	0	0	21	21st	?
2023	Mygale M14-F4	(China) Liu Tiezheng	4	0	0	0	0	18	22nd	?
2023	Mygale M14-F4	(China) Zhang Yu	4	0	0	0	0	18	25th	?
2023	Mygale M14-F4	(China) Fu Zhenjiang	4	0	0	0	0	1	31st	?
2024	Mygale M21-F4	(China) Jiang Fukang	18	4	1	0	8	237	3rd	?
2024	Mygale M21-F4	(Vietnam) Alex Sawer	6	2	1	1	2	84	7th	?
2024	Mygale M21-F4	(China) Meng Cheng	4	0	0	0	0	0	33rd	?
2024	Mygale M21-F4	(China) Fu Zhenjiang	4	0	0	0	0	0	44th	?
2024	Mygale M21-F4	(China) Lu Ye	4	0	0	0	0	7	22nd	?
2024	Mygale M21-F4	(China) Lu Ye	8	0	0	0	0	7	22nd	?
2024	Mygale M21-F4	(China) Yang Kaiwen	4	0	0	0	0	9	20th	?
2024	Mygale M21-F4	(China) Li Sicheng	2	0	0	0	0	4	25th	?
2024	Mygale M21-F4	(Chinese Taipei) Richard Lin	4	0	0	0	0	2	29th	?
2024	Mygale M21-F4	(Russia) Viktor Turkin	4	0	0	0	0	0	39th	?
2025	Mygale M21-F4	(Russia) Andrey Dubynin	20	0	0	0	5	170	5th	5th
2025	Mygale M21-F4	(Hong Kong) Tiger Zhang	12	0	0	0	0	6	20th	5th
2025	Mygale M21-F4	(Macau) Marcus Cheong	4	0	0	0	0	10	17th	5th
2025	Mygale M21-F4	(France) Héloïse Goldberg	4	0	0	0	0	6	22nd	5th
2025	Mygale M21-F4	(Russia) Viktor Turkin	20	0	0	0	0	6	23rd	13th
2025	Mygale M21-F4	(China) Huang Chujian	8	0	0	0	0	0	32nd	13th
2025	Mygale M21-F4	(China) Jack Pang	2	0	0	0	0	0	36th	13th
2025	Mygale M21-F4	(China) Lu Ye	4	0	0	0	0	0	39th	13th
2025	Mygale M21-F4	(China) Li Zebing	2	0	0	0	0	0	40th	13th
2025	Mygale M21-F4	(Macau) Vernice Lao	4	0	0	0	0	0	35th	17th
2026	Mygale M21-F4	(China) Josh Feng								
2026	Mygale M21-F4	(Russia) Timur Shagaliev								
2026	Mygale M21-F4	(China) Huang Chujian								
2026	Mygale M21-F4	(China) Chen Zhuyuan								
2026	Mygale M21-F4	(Macau) Vernice Lao								
2026	Mygale M21-F4	(Russia) Viktor Turkin								
2026	Mygale M21-F4	(France) Héloïse Goldberg								
2026	Mygale M21-F4	(China) Yang Kaiwen								

† Hong competed for FFA Racing until round 2. ‡ Sicheng competed for GEEKE XL DRIFT in round 1.

== Formula 4 South East Asia Championship ==
=== Results ===
Year	Car	Drivers	Races	Wins	Poles	F/Laps	Podiums	Points	D.C.	T.C.
2023	Tatuus F4-T421	(China) Kevin Xiao	9	1	0	0	1	51	4th	2nd
2023	Tatuus F4-T421	(Macau) Tiago Rodrigues	3	0	0	1	3	51	5th	2nd
2023	Tatuus F4-T421	(Chinese Taipei) Enzo Yeh	6	0	0	0	1	46	7th	2nd
2023	Tatuus F4-T421	(China) Zhang Yu	5	0	0	0	0	26	14th	2nd
2023	Tatuus F4-T421	(Philippines) Joaquin Garrido	3	0	0	0	0	1	28th	2nd
2023	Tatuus F4-T421	(China) Lu Ye	2	0	0	0	0	0	29th	2nd

== Timeline ==
Current series
F4 Chinese Championship	2015–2016, 2020–2021, 2023–present
Open Formula Challenge	2022–present
Former series
Asian Formula Renault Series	2003–2019
Formula BMW Pacific	2008–2010
Porsche Carrera Cup Asia	2009–2015
Formula Pilota China	2011–2012
GT Asia Series	2011–2014
TCR Asia Series	2015–2016
TCR International Series	2015–2016
Formula 4 South East Asia Championship	2023
