= Guillaume Cunnington =

French racing driver

- Nationality: French
- Born: 7 July 1976 (age 50) Paris, Île-de-France, France

All-Japan Formula Three Championship career
- Debut season: 2015
- Current team: FSC Motorsport
- Car number: 18
- Starts: 11
- Best finish: 4th in 2015

Previous series
- 2015 2013-14: Asian Formula Renault Series; TCR International Series

Championship titles
- 2014: Asian Formula Renault Series

Guillaume Cunnington (born 7 July 1976) is a French racing driver who competed in the TCR International Series, the All-Japan Formula Three Championship with FSC Motorsport. and the Asian Formula Renault Series, where he won the Masters Class in 2014.

== Racing career ==
Cunnington began his career in 2013 in the Asian Formula Renault Series, winning the Masters Class in 2014. In 2015, he raced in the All-Japan Formula Three Championship national class with the FSC Motorsport team founded by Antoine Malin. The team was powered by TOM'S Racing. In his first season, he finished sixth in the national class standings, with a best overall finish of fourth in Sugo.

In November 2015, Cunnington raced in the TCR International Series, driving a SEAT León Cup Racer for Liqui Moly Team Engstler. at the famed Circuito da Guia in Macau, where he finished 17th in the first race before retiring in the second. As of 2017, that was his last professional race.

== Racing record ==
=== Complete TCR International Series results ===
(key) (Races in bold indicate pole position) (Races in italics indicate fastest lap)

Year	Team	Car	1	2	3	4	5	6	7	8	9	10	11	12	13	14	15	16	17	18	19	20	21	22	DC	Points
2015	Liqui Moly Team Engstler	SEAT León Cup Racer	MYS; 1	MYS; 2	CHN; 1	CHN; 2	ESP; 1	ESP; 2	POR; 1	POR; 2	ITA; 1	ITA; 2	AUT; 1	AUT; 2	RUS; 1	RUS; 2	RBR; 1	RBR; 2	SIN; 1	SIN; 2	THA; 1	THA; 2	MAC; 1; 17	MAC; 2 Ret	NC	0
