= Jim Ka To =

China Touring Car Championship

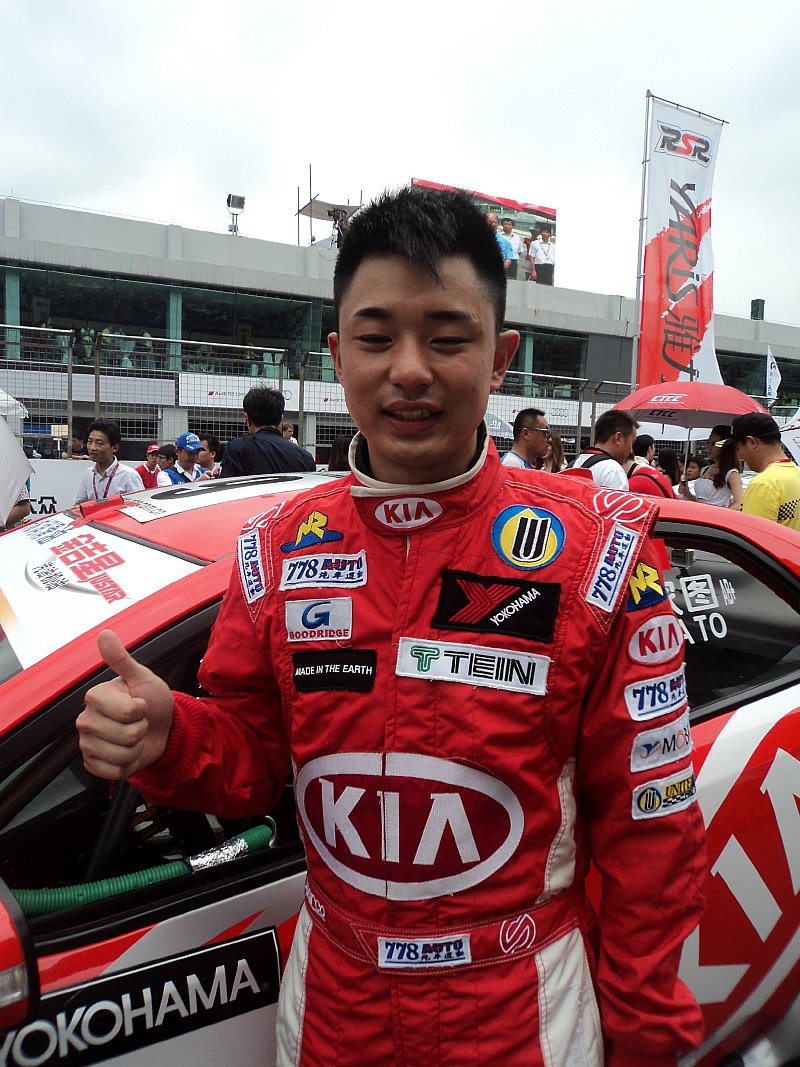
- Jim Ka To preparing to race in ZIC in 2012.
- Nationality: (Hong Kong) Hongkonger
- Born: November 28, 1984 (age 41) British Hong Kong
- Relatives: Jim Chong Shing

Asian Formula Renault Challenge career
- Debut season: 2003
- Current team: Frestech FRD
- Categorisation: FIA Silver
- Car number: 5
- Starts: 14
- Wins: 8
- Poles: 7
- Best finish: 1st in 2008

Championship titles
- 2008: Asian Formula Renault Challenge Champion

Chinese name
- Traditional Chinese: 詹家圖
- Yale Romanization: Jīm Gātòuh
- Jyutping: Zim1 Gaa1tou4

Jim Ka To (Chinese: 詹家圖; born 28 November 1984 in Hong Kong) is a race car driver who competed in the 2001 Formula Renault 2000 Eurocup and currently competes in the China Touring Car Championship.

The son of Hong Kong street car racer Jim Chong Shing, he started racing at an early age at the Zhuhai International Circuit. He showed great potential in the China Formula Campus series and was sent by Formula Racing Developments to La Filière in France to be trained to become a racing driver.

Upon his return, Jim took pole position in the Asian Formula 2000 race in Macau at the age of 16. But his single-seater career has stagnated since then. In 2011, he decided to move to touring cars.

== 2004 ==
In 2004, Jim finished second in the Asian Formula Renault Championship. He then scored a sensational pole position in the Macau Formula Renault race, beating drivers like Kamui Kobayashi, Scott Speed and Bruno Senna. But he crashed in the race and was taken to hospital for a check up. He was uninjured.

Jim was signed by Red Bull to join their young drivers' programme for 2005 and was to join the Motorpark Oschersleben team that took Scott Speed to the 2004 Formula Renault 2.0 Eurocup titl, but due to health problems, he returned to Hong Kong before entering any race in the 2005 series.

== 2007 ==
In 2007, Jim competed in the Asian Formula Renault Challenge and won two races in Zhuhai in January and finished best Asian driver that season. He competed with Formula Racing Developments racing team, under the management of Kenneth Ma.

In November 2007, Jim was announced as one of the drivers for Team PTRS for the 2007/08 Asian Formula Three Championship. He partnered Briton Matt Howson.

== 2008 season ==
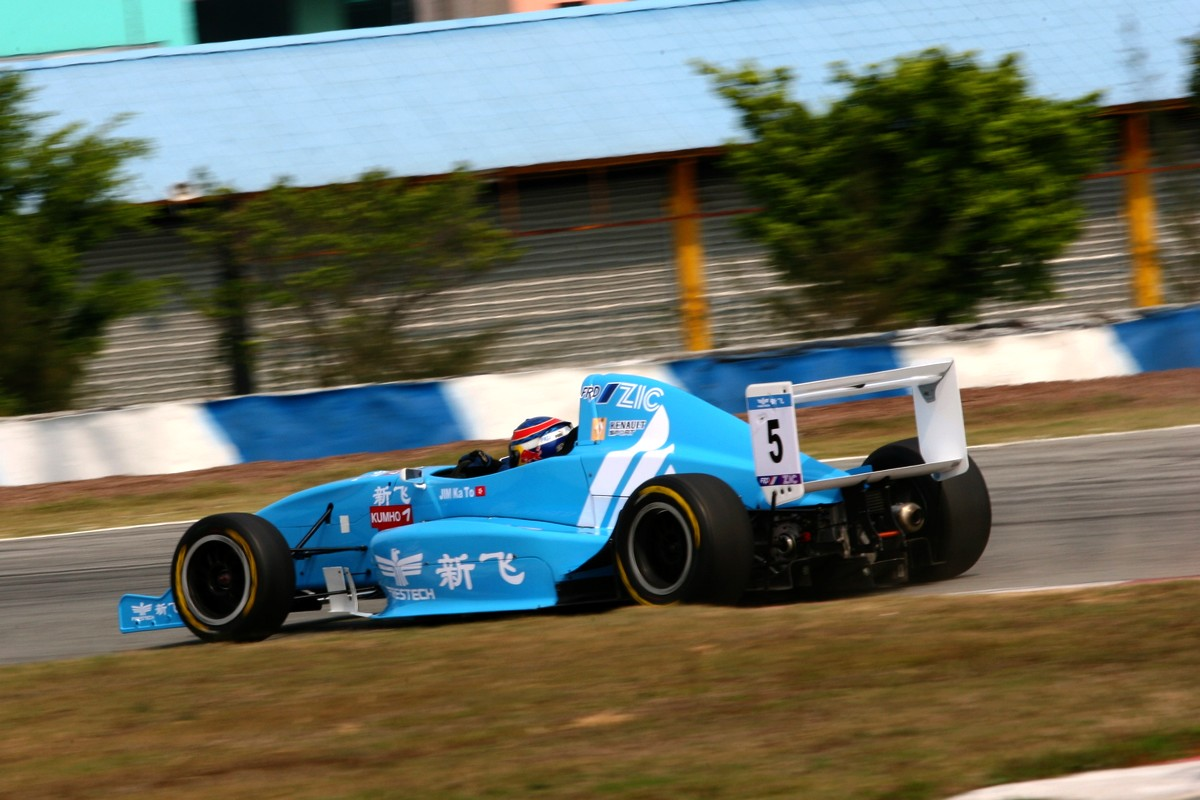
Jim racing in Asian Formula Renault Championship in Zhuhai.

In 2008, Jim competed in the Asian Formula Renault Championship again for Formula Racing Developments, sponsored by Frestech Electrical Appliances. He also competed in the Formula BMW Pacific Series' finale at the Macau Grand Prix.

From 13 to 16 November 2008, Jim took part in the Formula BMW Pacific race in Macau. He qualified 12th and crashed in the race. His crash caused the race to be stopped and he was classified seventh in the final results.

On 13 and 14 December 2008, Jim competed in the final two rounds of the Asian Formula Renault Championship. He won both races and became the 2008 Asian Formula Renault Champion, beating Geoffrey Kwong.

== 2008 Assault case ==
On 4 November 2008, Jim was arrested by the Hong Kong police on suspicion of assault at the Hong Kong–Macau Ferry Terminal. He was charged with assault occasioning actual bodily harm, inflicting grievous bodily harm and assault occasioning actual bodily harm. On 26 May 2009, he was found guilty by the Kwun Tong Magistracy. He remained in custody after conviction and was sentenced to 15 months in prison on 16 June 2009. After three months in jail, he was released on appeal on 16 September 2009.

== 2009 Formula BMW Pacific ==
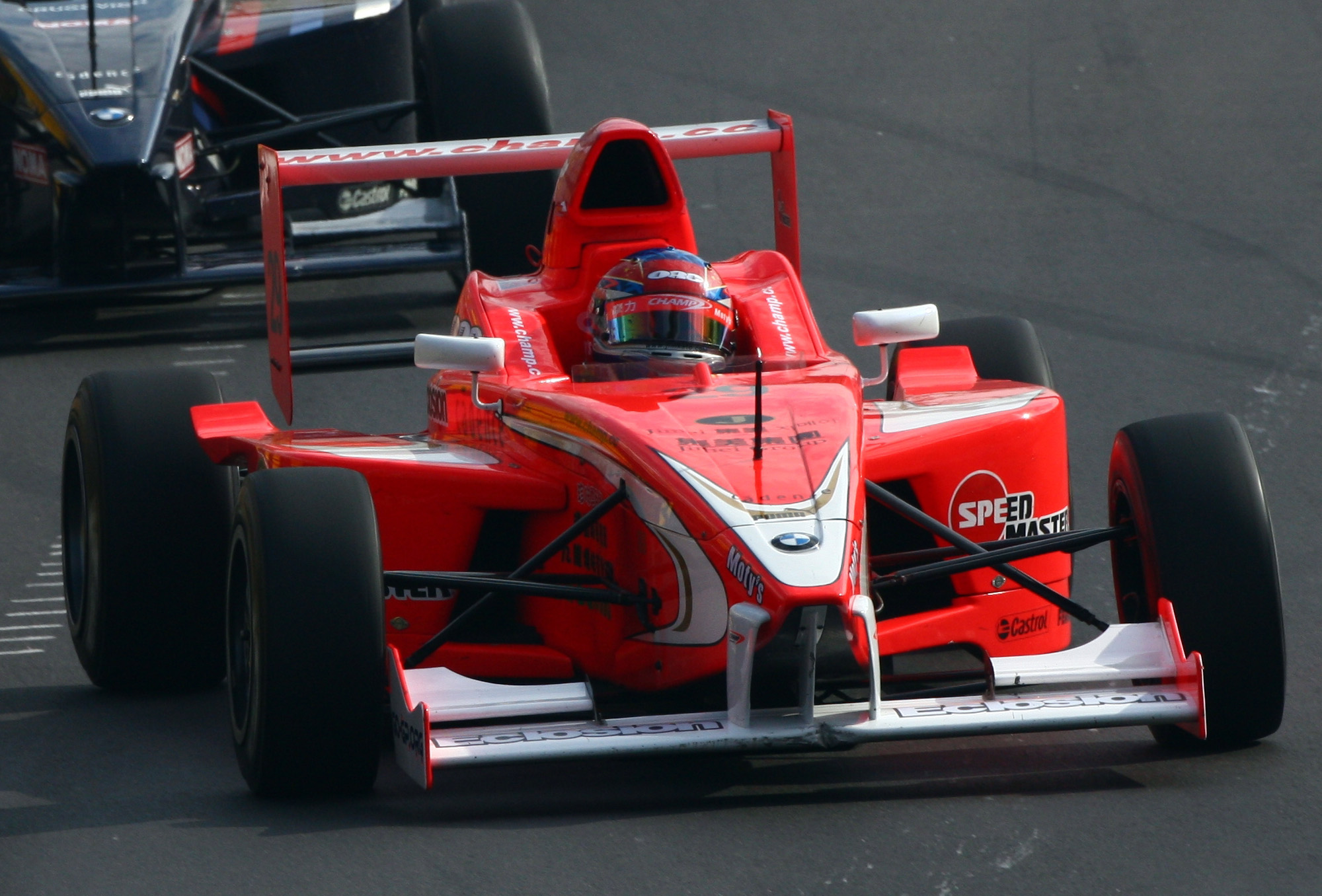
Jim racing in the 2009 Formula BMW Pacific race in Macau.

After being released from jail, Jim entered the 2009 Formula BMW Pacific race at the 2009 Macau Grand Prix. He finished fourth in the race. It was the eighth time he raced in Macau.

== 2010 Formula BMW Pacific ==
Jim competed again in the Macau round of the 2010 Formula BMW Pacific season. He qualified 13th and finished seventh.

== 2010 accident and conviction ==
At 2am on 23 June 2010, Jim crashed his friend's car into the back of a taxi on Cherry Street in Hong Kong. He was convicted of careless driving and driving an uninsured car on 10 January 2010 at the Kowloon City Magistrate. He was fined HK$2,900 with his driving license suspended for a year.

== 2011 and 2012 China Touring Car Championship ==
In 2011 and 2012, Jim joined 778 Autosport and drove one of their Kias in the China Touring Car Championship.

== 2013 World Endurance Championship ==
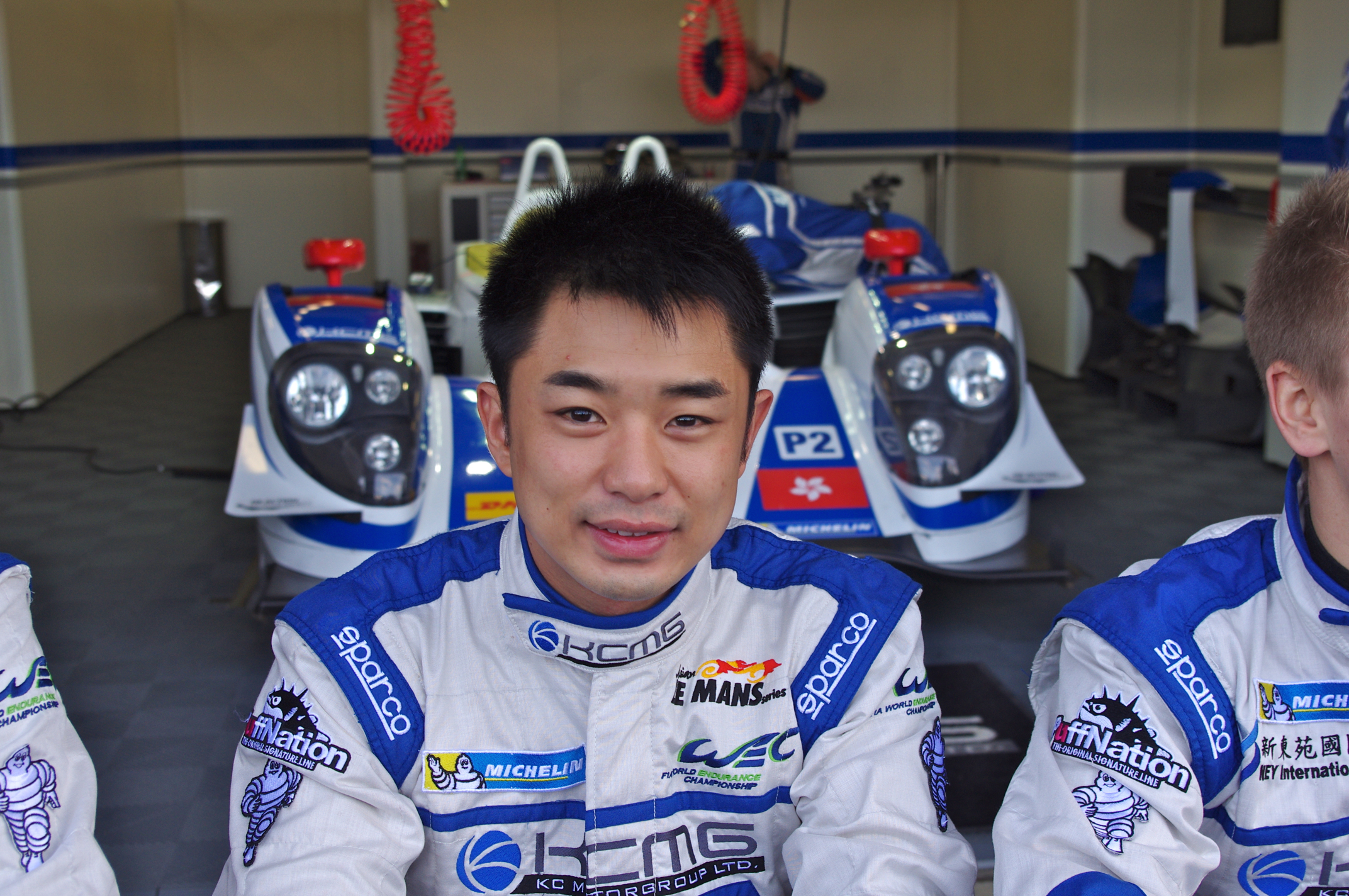
Jim at the Silverstone 6 Hours with KCMG in 2013.

On 8 March 2013, KCMG announced that Jim would partner Alexandre Imperatori and Matt Howson to drive its no.47 Morgan-Nissan LMP2 entry at the 6 Hours of Silverstone, part of the 2013 FIA World Endurance Championship season. The trio finished the race sixth in class and 12th overall, five laps behind the class winner. Chinese driver Ho Pin Tung will take his place in the team for the 2013 24 Hours of Le Mans.

== 2019 World Touring Car Cup ==
On 9 October 2019, KCMG announced that Jim would join KCMG regular WTCR competitors Tiago Monteiro and Attila Tassi for the Suzuka Round of the 2019 World Touring Car Cup in a wild card entry. On 24 October, he was also confirmed to race for KCMG in the FIA WTCR races in Macau.
