= Formula Renault AsiaCup =

Single-Seater Racing Championship

- Category: Formula Renault 2.0 (2002-2019, 2022)
- Country: Asia
- Inaugural season: 2002
- Folded: 2022
- Constructors: Tatuus
- Engine suppliers: Renault
- Last Drivers' champion: (Hong Kong) Gerrard Xie
- Last Teams' champion: (Hong Kong) H-Star Racing
- Official website: rsasiamotorsport.com/formularenault/

The Formula Renault AsiaCup (formerly known as the Asian Formula Renault Challenge and AFR Series) was a Formula Regional championship held in Asia. The series debuted in 2002 and also held the China Formula Renault Challenge.

The series is a part of the Formula Racing Development Limited (FRD) organization managed by Kenneth Ma to promote motorsport in Asia. The FRD also runs the China Formula Campus and Clio Cup China Series.

The cars use Tatuus chassis and 2.0 L Renault Clio engines like other Formula Renault 2.0 series. After several seasons racing on Kumho tires, the series started using Giti tires from 2014.

== About ==
With the aim of providing a budget junior racing series around the Asian region, FRD, with the support of Renault Sport, imported a fleet of Formula Renault 2.0 race cars and first organized the Asian Formula Renault Series in 2000. The series attracted numerous young talents from the region.

From 2002 to 2005, the series held an invitational race during the Macau Grand Prix weekend. Future F1 drivers such as Kamui Kobayashi, Kazuki Nakajima, Bruno Senna and Red Bull Junior Team's Scott Speed all once took part in the event.

The Asian Formula Renault Series changed its name to the Formula Renault AsiaCup, commencing in 2020. Formula Renault AsiaCup aligned with the Formula Renault Eurocup running the Tatuus F3R-Spec car with a Renault engine (Formula Renault FR-19) and the FIA F3/2018 homologated chassis.

== Regulation ==
The main classification was the International Challenge, the winner of which was the overall champion of the series. From 2007 until 2013, Asian drivers also had a parallel category with the Asian Challenge. Another class, for Chinese events only, was the China Formula Renault Challenge, which was an entry-level series intended to reduce the championship cost. All series drivers and teams raced at the same time during the races in China but points were calculated separately.

The cars can be tested outside the race weekend on the Zhuhai International Circuit or Shanghai International Circuit.

The race weekend starts on Thursday and Friday with a 2-hour free practice session but with additional cost for drivers. On Saturday there are two 30 minute practice sessions and 20 minutes of qualifications. A warm-up (15 minutes) occurs on Sunday morning and two 10 lap races are held in the afternoon.

In 2013, the series changed its championship format to 3 classes, "International Class" as the main championship, "Asian Class" for rookie drivers of the region and "Masters Class" for gentlemen drivers who are at the age of 35 or older. The 3 classes have their own drivers' and teams' classifications and championship.

In 2015, the series changed its championship format again due to the introduction of the current FR2.0 car, which debuted in 2013 in the European series. Starting from this season, there are two classes, Class A for drivers and teams competing with the 2013 FR2.0 car, and Class B for drivers and teams using the FR2.0 old spec cars.

Only drivers and teams that complete 75% of a race receive points. Points are awarded in each race as follows:

Drivers' Championship
Position	1st	2nd	3rd	4th	5th	6th	7th	8th	9th	10th	11th	12th	13th	14th
Points	30	24	20	17	15	13	11	9	7	5	4	3	2	1

Teams' Championship
Position	1st	2nd	3rd	4th	5th	6th	7th	8th
Points	10	8	6	5	4	3	2	1

== Champions ==
=== Series Winners ===
Season	International Class	Team Champion	Asian Class (class B 2015 onward)	Team Champion	IFC Challenge/Masters Class	Team Champion
2002	(China) Cheng Congfu	(China) FRD Team				
2003	(Macau) Rodolfo Ávila	(Macau) Asia Racing Team				
2004	(Japan) Hideaki Nakao	(China) FRD Team				
2005	(Taiwan) Hanss Lin	(China) Shangsai FRD Team			(Taiwan) Hanss Lin	(China) Shangsai FRD Team
2006	(Finland) Pekka Saarinen	(Macau) Asia Racing Team			(Switzerland) Alexandre Imperatori	(China) Shangsai FRD Team
2007	(Finland) Pekka Saarinen	(China) M3 Racing Team	(Hong Kong) Jim Ka To	(China) M3 Racing Team	(Finland) Pekka Saarinen	(China) M3 Racing Team
2008	(Hong Kong) Jim Ka To	(Finland) PS Racing	(China) Hong-Wei Cao	Not Contested	(Canada) Christian Chia	Not Contested
2009	(Israel) Alon Day	(Macau) Asia Racing Team	(China) Zhi Qiang Zhang	(China) PTRS Team	Not Contested	
2010	(Thailand) Sandy Nicholas Stuvik	(Macau) Asia Racing Team	(Thailand) Sandy Nicholas Stuvik	(Macau) Asia Racing Team	Not Contested	
2011	(Finland) Leopold Ringbom	(Finland) PS Racing	(Japan) Yuki Shiraishi	(China) Champ Motorsport	Not Contested	
2012	(Japan) Yosuke Yamazaki	(Hong Kong) Buzz Racing	Not Contested		(Canada) Wayne Shen	(China) Modena Motorsport
2013	(Colombia) Julio Acosta	(China) Champ Motorsport	(Taiwan) Jason Kang	(Taiwan) KRC	(Hong Kong) Leo Wong	(Macau) Asia Racing Team
2014	(United Kingdom) Alice Powell	(China) FRD Team	(China) Qin Tianqi	(China) Champ Motorsport	(France) Guillaume Cunnington	(Finland) PS Racing
2015	(United Kingdom) Dan Wells	(Hong Kong) BlackArts Racing Team	(China) Andy Zheng	(Finland) PS Racing	Not Contested	
2016	(Australia) Josh Burdon	(Hong Kong) BlackArts Racing Team	(Hong Kong) Jasper Thong	(Macau) Asia Racing Team	Not Contested	
2017	(Macau) Charles Leong	(Hong Kong) BlackArts Racing Team	(China) Hua Miao	(Hong Kong) BlackArts Racing Team	Not Contested	
2018	(China) Daniel Cao	(Hong Kong) BlackArts Racing Team			Not Contested	
2019	(Netherlands) Joey Alders	(Hong Kong) BlackArts Racing Team			Not Contested	
2020	Not held due to COVID-19 pandemic restrictions					
2021	Not held due to COVID-19 pandemic restrictions					
2022	(Hong Kong) Gerrard Xie	(Hong Kong) H-Star Racing				

=== Macau Asian Formula Renault Challenge Winners ===
Year	Pole position	Winning drivers	Winning team
2002	(United Kingdom) Jamie Green	(United Kingdom) Jamie Green	(Malaysia) Team Meritus
2003	(Japan) Hideki Nadao	(Japan) Hideki Nadao	(China) Shangsai FRD GT TiresTeam
2004	(Japan) Kamui Kobayashi	(Macau) Cheong Lou Meng	(China) Champ Motorsport
2005	(Italy) Luca Persiani	(Japan) Hiroyuki Matsumura	(China) Asia Racing Team
