= 2017 TCR China Touring Car Championship =

The 2017 TCR China season was the first season of the TCR's Chinese Touring Car Championship.

== Teams and drivers ==
Team	Car	No.	Drivers	Rounds
(China) New Faster Team	Volkswagen Golf GTi TCR	21	(China) Lin Li Feng	1–4
(China) New Faster Team	Volkswagen Golf GTi TCR	21	(China) Wang Hao	All
(China) New Faster Team	Audi RS3 LMS TCR	81	(China) Huang Chu Han	All
(China) New Faster Team	Audi RS3 LMS TCR	82	(Hong Kong) Andy Yan	All
(Hong Kong) Teamwork Motorsport	Volkswagen Golf GTi TCR	26	(Macau) Filipe de Souza	1–3
(Hong Kong) Teamwork Motorsport	Volkswagen Golf GTi TCR	26	(Hong Kong) Samuel Hsieh	1–3
(Hong Kong) Teamwork Motorsport	Volkswagen Golf GTi TCR	31	(Hong Kong) Alex Hui	All
(Hong Kong) Teamwork Motorsport	Volkswagen Golf GTi TCR	31	(Hong Kong) Paul Poon	1
(Hong Kong) Teamwork Motorsport	Volkswagen Golf GTi TCR	31	(China) Ma Qing Hua	2
(Hong Kong) Teamwork Motorsport	Volkswagen Golf GTi TCR	31	(France) Jean-Karl Vernay	3
(Hong Kong) Teamwork Motorsport	Volkswagen Golf GTi TCR	62	(Hong Kong) Alex Fung	1–4
(Hong Kong) Teamwork Motorsport	Volkswagen Golf GTi TCR	62	(Hong Kong) Sunny Wong	All
(China) HE Racing	Volkswagen Golf GTi TCR	58	(China) Han Hui Lin	1
(China) HE Racing	Volkswagen Golf GTi TCR	58	(China) Tian Li Ying	1
(China) HE Racing	Volkswagen Golf GTi TCR	58	(China) He Xiao Le	2
(China) HE Racing	Volkswagen Golf GTi TCR	58	(China) Lu Chuan	2
(China) HE Racing	Volkswagen Golf GTi TCR	58	(Hong Kong) Lo Kai Bong	3–4
(China) HE Racing	Volkswagen Golf GTi TCR	68	(China) Gu Xiao Gang	5
(China) HE Racing	Volkswagen Golf GTi TCR	68	(China) Li Fei	5
(China) Linky Racing Team	Audi RS3 LMS TCR	66	(China) Cai Hong Yu	1–3
(China) Linky Racing Team	Audi RS3 LMS TCR	66	(China) Zhang Ya Qi	1
(China) Linky Racing Team	Audi RS3 LMS TCR	66	(China) Bai Ya Xin	2
(China) Leo 109 Racing	Volkswagen Golf GTi TCR	77	(China) Hu Hao	1–3
(China) Leo 109 Racing	Volkswagen Golf GTi TCR	77	(China) Li Hui Wei	1
(China) Leo 109 Racing	Volkswagen Golf GTi TCR	77	(China) Li Lin	4
(China) Leo 109 Racing	Audi RS3 LMS TCR	99	(China) Deng Bao Wei	All
(China) Leo 109 Racing	Audi RS3 LMS TCR	99	(China) Li Lin	1–2
(China) Leo 109 Racing	Audi RS3 LMS TCR	99	(Hong Kong) Henry Lee Junior	4
(China) AVM Racing	SEAT León TCR	79	(China) Qi Pei Wen	1–4
(China) AVM Racing	SEAT León TCR	79	(China) Zhou Hao Wen	1–4
(Macau) Elegant Racing Team	SEAT León TCR	98	(Hong Kong) Eric Kwong	2–3
(Macau) Elegant Racing Team	SEAT León TCR	98	(Hong Kong) Kenneth Look	2
(Macau) Elegant Racing Team	SEAT León TCR	98	(Norway) Stian Paulsen	3
(Macau) Elegant Racing Team	SEAT León TCR	99	(Macau) Alex Liu	2
(Macau) Elegant Racing Team	SEAT León TCR	99	(South Korea) Andrew Kim	2
(Macau) Elegant Racing Team	SEAT León TCR	99	(Macau) Henry Ho	3
(Macau) Elegant Racing Team	SEAT León TCR	99	(Hong Kong) Kenneth Look	3

== Calendar and results ==
The 2017 schedule was announced on 18 December 2016, with five events scheduled one invitation round in Macau. Yet all cars from TCR China withdrew from the Macau race due to freight delay.

Rnd.		Circuit	Date	Pole position	Fastest lap	Winning driver	Winning team	Supporting
1	1	(China) Shanghai International Circuit	5 August	(Hong Kong) Alex Hui	(China) Huang Chu Han	(China) Huang Chu Han	(China) New Faster Team	China Touring Car Championship
1	2	(China) Shanghai International Circuit	5 August	(China) Huang Chu Han	(Hong Kong) Alex Fung	(Hong Kong) Andy Yan	(China) New Faster Team	China Touring Car Championship
1	3	(China) Shanghai International Circuit	6 August	(Hong Kong) Andy Yan	(Hong Kong) Andy Yan	(Hong Kong) Andy Yan	(China) New Faster Team	China Touring Car Championship
2	4	(China) Shanghai International Circuit	26 August	(Hong Kong) Andy Yan	(China) Huang Chu Han	(China) Huang Chu Han	(China) New Faster Team	TCR Asia Series
2	5	(China) Shanghai International Circuit	27 August	(Hong Kong) Sunny Wong	(China) Huang Chu Han	(Hong Kong) Sunny Wong	(Hong Kong) TeamWork Motorsport	TCR Asia Series
2	6	(China) Shanghai International Circuit	27 August	(Hong Kong) Alex Fung (Hong Kong) Sunny Wong	(Hong Kong) Alex Hui (China) Qing Hua Ma	(China) Huang Chu Han	(China) New Faster Team	TCR Asia Series
3	7	(China) Zhejiang International Circuit	7 October	(France) Jean-Karl Vernay	(France) Jean-Karl Vernay	(France) Jean-Karl Vernay	(Hong Kong) TeamWork Motorsport	TCR International Series; TCR Asia Series
3	8	(China) Zhejiang International Circuit	7 October	(Hong Kong) Andy Yan	(China) Huang Chu Han	(Hong Kong) Andy Yan	(China) New Faster Team	TCR International Series; TCR Asia Series
3	9	(China) Zhejiang International Circuit	8 October	(France) Jean-Karl Vernay (Hong Kong) Alex Hui	(France) Jean-Karl Vernay (Hong Kong) Alex Hui	(China) Huang Chu Han	(China) New Faster Team	TCR International Series; TCR Asia Series
4	10	(China) Ningbo International Circuit	28 October	(Hong Kong) Andy Yan	(Hong Kong) Andy Yan	(Hong Kong) Andy Yan	(China) New Faster Team	China F4 Championship
4	11	(China) Ningbo International Circuit	28 October	(Hong Kong) Andy Yan	(Hong Kong) Andy Yan	(Hong Kong) Andy Yan	(China) New Faster Team	China F4 Championship
4	12	(China) Ningbo International Circuit	29 October	(Hong Kong) Andy Yan	(Hong Kong) Alex Fung (Hong Kong) Sunny Wong	(Hong Kong) Andy Yan	(China) New Faster Team	China F4 Championship
5	13	(China) Guangdong International Circuit	30-31 December	(Hong Kong) Andy Yan	(Hong Kong) Alex Hui	(Hong Kong) Andy Yan	(China) New Faster Team	
5	14	(China) Guangdong International Circuit	30-31 December	(Hong Kong) Andy Yan	(Hong Kong) Andy Yan	(Hong Kong) Sunny Wong	(Hong Kong) TeamWork Motorsport	
5	15	(China) Guangdong International Circuit	30-31 December	(Hong Kong) Sunny Wong	(Hong Kong) Andy Yan	(Hong Kong) Andy Yan	(China) New Faster Team	
Inv.		Guia Circuit, Macau	16-19 November	No championship drivers took part.				World Touring Car Championship

== Championship standings ==
=== Drivers' championship ===
Pos.	Driver	SHA (China)			SHA (China)			ZHE (China)			NIN (China)			GUA (China)			Pts.
Pos.	Driver	RD1	RD2	RD3	RD1	RD2	RD3	RD1	RD2	RD3	RD1	RD2	RD3	RD1	RD2	RD3	Pts.
1	(Hong Kong) Andy Yan	3	1	**1**	**2**	3	10	2	**1**	4	**1**	**1**	**1**	**1**	**3**	1	294
2	(China) Huang Chu Han	1	**4**	7	1	Ret	1	3	3	1	3	Ret	3	4	2	5	218
3	(Hong Kong) Alex Hui	**5**		3	Ret	2	2		2	**3**	4	6	7	3	4	2	205
4	(Hong Kong) Sunny Wong	2		2		**1**	**3**	8		10		8	2	2	1	4	201
5	(Hong Kong) Alex Fung		5	2	3		**3**		Ret	10	2		2				146
6	(China) Wang Hao	6	10	4	5		4	6	Ret	5	5	4	5	5	5	3	140
7	(China) Lin Li Feng			4		4	4			5			5				105
8	(China) Deng Bao Wei		8	5		7	7	4	5	12	8	2	6	Ret	6	Ret	92
9	(China) Qi Pei Wen	10		9	6		6	7		6	9		8				65
9	(China) Zhou Hao Wen		7	9		5	6		8	6		7	8				65
10	(France) Jean-Karl Vernay							**1**		**3**							58
11	(China) Li Lin	7		5	Ret		7				7	3	9				55
12	(Macau) Filipe de Souza		2	Ret	4		DNS		4	11							54
12	(Hong Kong) Samuel Hsieh	4		Ret		Ret	DNS	Ret		11							54
13	(Hong Kong) Lo Kai Bong							5	7	9	6	5	4				48
14	(Hong Kong) Paul Poon		3	3													40
15	(China) Ma Qing Hua						2										36
16	(Hong Kong) Henry Lee Junior												6				30
17	(China) He Xiao Le						5										24
17	(China) Lu Chuan				7	6	5										24
18	(China) Hu Hao	Ret		8	8	8	9	9	Ret	7							22
19	(China) Gu Xiao Gang													6		6	22
19	(China) Li Fei														7	6	22
20	(China) Han Hui Lin	8		6													20
20	(China) Tian Li Ying		6	6													20
21	(Hong Kong) Kenneth Look						Ret			2							18
22	(Macau) Henry Ho									2							18
23	(China) Cai Hong Yu	9		Ret	Ret		8	Ret	6	13							16
24	(China) Li Hui Wei		11	8													4
25	(China) Bai Ya Xin					Ret	8										4
26	(Hong Kong) Eric Kwong						Ret			8							4
27	(Norway) Stian Paulsen									8							4
28	(China) Zhang Ya Qi		9	Ret													2
29	(Macau) Alex Liu						Ret										0
29	(South Korea) Andrew Kim						Ret										0
Pos.	Driver	SHA (China)			SHA (China)			ZHE (China)			NIN (China)			GUA (China)			Pts.

Colour	Result
Gold	Winner
Silver	Second place
Bronze	Third place
Green	Points classification
Blue	Non-points classification
Blue	Non-classified finish (NC)
Purple	Retired, not classified (Ret)
Red	Did not qualify (DNQ)
Red	Did not pre-qualify (DNPQ)
Black	Disqualified (DSQ)
White	Did not start (DNS)
White	Withdrew (WD)
White	Race cancelled (C)
Blank	Did not practice (DNP)
Blank	Did not arrive (DNA)
Blank	Excluded (EX)

**Bold** – Pole

Italics – Fastest Lap
