= 2026 TCR China Touring Car Championship =

Motorsport season

The 2026 TCR China Touring Car Championship season is the ninth season of the TCR's Chinese Touring Car Championship.

== Calendar ==
The provisional 2026 schedule was announced on 5 November 2025 during the 2025 prize-giving ceremony, with six championship events scheduled. The season begins at the Shanghai International Circuit on 24 April and will end at the Zhuzhou International Circuit on 25 October. The final appearance will be a non-championship round with no points awarded in Sepang. It will also mark the first time CTCC races outside mainland China.

At the end of August 2026, the calendar was completed. The Chengdu Tianfu International Circuit hosted TCR China for the first time, taking over Round 5, while the Zhejiang International Circuit took over the season finale. The finale at Zhuzhou was cancelled.

Rnd.		Circuit	Date	Supporting
1	1	(China) Shanghai International Circuit, Jiading, Shanghai	24–26 April	CTCC China Cup China; Lynk & Co Auto Challenge
1	2	(China) Shanghai International Circuit, Jiading, Shanghai	24–26 April	CTCC China Cup China; Lynk & Co Auto Challenge
2	3	(China) Ningbo International Circuit, Beilun, Ningbo	29–31 May	CTCC China Cup
2	4	(China) Ningbo International Circuit, Beilun, Ningbo	29–31 May	CTCC China Cup
3	5	(China) Ordos International Circuit, Kangbashi, Ordos City	7–9 August	CTCC China Cup; Lynk & Co Auto Challenge
3	6	(China) Ordos International Circuit, Kangbashi, Ordos City	7–9 August	CTCC China Cup; Lynk & Co Auto Challenge
4	7	(China) Shanghai International Circuit, Jiading, Shanghai	11–13 September	CTCC China Cup; CTCC One Lap to Glory Challenge (NYR); Hyundai N Cup
4	8	(China) Shanghai International Circuit, Jiading, Shanghai	11–13 September	CTCC China Cup; CTCC One Lap to Glory Challenge (NYR); Hyundai N Cup
5	9	(China) Chengdu Tianfu International Circuit, Chengdu	16–18 October	TCR World Tour; TCR Asia Tour
5	10	(China) Chengdu Tianfu International Circuit, Chengdu	16–18 October	TCR World Tour; TCR Asia Tour
6	11	(China) Zhejiang International Circuit, Zhejiang, Shaoxing	23–25 October	TCR World Tour; TCR Asia Tour; CTCC China Cup
6	12	(China) Zhejiang International Circuit, Zhejiang, Shaoxing	23–25 October	TCR World Tour; TCR Asia Tour; CTCC China Cup
Non-Championship Round
NC	-	Sepang International Circuit, Selangor, Malaysia	12–13 December	12 Hours of Sepang; Formula Trophy Malaysia; TCR Asia Series; CTCC Electric Racing Cup

== Teams and drivers ==
Team	Car	No.	Drivers	Class	Rounds	Ref.
(China) Lynk & Co Teamwork Motorsport	Lynk & Co 03+ TCR	1	(China) David Zhu Dai Wei		TBC	
(China) Lynk & Co Teamwork Motorsport	Lynk & Co 03+ TCR	12	(Hong Kong) Sunny Wong		TBC	
(China) Lynk & Co Teamwork Motorsport	Lynk & Co 03+ TCR	36	(China) Zhi Qiang Zhang		TBC	
(China) Lynk & Co Teamwork Motorsport	Lynk & Co 03+ TCR	117	(China) Lin Zhi Shan		TBC	
(China) Lynk & Co Teamwork Motorsport	Lynk & Co 03+ TCR	921	(China) Han Dong Jun		TBC	
(Hong Kong) Team TRC	Honda Civic Type R TCR (FL5)	3	(Hong Kong) David Lau Ying Kit		TBC	
(Hong Kong) Team TRC	Honda Civic Type R TCR (FL5)	19	(Hong Kong) William Cheung		TBC	
(Hong Kong) Team TRC	Honda Civic Type R TCR (FL5)	237	(Hong Kong) Euan Chan Ho Ting		TBC	
(China) Jiren Motorsport	Audi RS 3 LMS TCR (2021)	5	(China) Lin Zhi Shan		TBC	
(Macau) MacPro Racing Team	Honda Civic Type R TCR (FL5)	11	(China) Deng Shi Kun		TBC	
(Macau) MacPro Racing Team	Honda Civic Type R TCR (FL5)	77	(China) Zhu Cheng		TBC	
(Macau) MacPro Racing Team	Honda Civic Type R TCR (FL5)	87	(Hong Kong) Man Siu Ming		TBC	
(China) Our Racing	Cupra León VZ TCR	15	(China) He Yuan		TBC	
(China) Our Racing	Cupra León VZ TCR	56	(China) Gao Ya Ou		TBC	
(Ecuador) ATE Racing by DM23	Honda Civic Type R TCR (FL5)	23	(Ecuador) Diego Moran		TBC	
(China) Norris Racing	Honda Civic Type R TCR (FL5)	26	(Hong Kong) Tony Chan		TBC	
(China) Mulberry Racing	Hyundai Elantra N TCR	27	(China) Li Ka Hei		TBC	
(China) Mulberry Racing	Hyundai Elantra N TCR	44	(China) Max Sang		TBC	
(China) Mulberry Racing	Hyundai Elantra N TCR	95	(China) Yu Run Ze		TBC	
(China) Mulberry Racing	Hyundai Elantra N TCR	102	(Hong Kong) Liu Hong Zhi		TBC	
(China) Spark Racing	Honda Civic Type R TCR (FL5)	37	(China) Zhou Yun Jie		TBC	
(China) Spark Racing	Honda Civic Type R TCR (FL5)	85	(China) Sun Ju Ran		TBC	
(Hong Kong) Teamwork Motorsport	Lynk & Co 03+ TCR	66	(China) Richard Li		TBC	
(Hong Kong) Teamwork Motorsport	Lynk & Co 03+ TCR	94	(China) Foo Kuk Cheung		TBC	
(Hong Kong) Teamwork Motorsport	Lynk & Co 03+ TCR	668	(Hong Kong) Paul Poon		TBC	
(China) Par by 300+	Lynk & Co 03+ TCR	83	(China) Niu Si Kai		TBC	
(China) Par by 300+	Lynk & Co 03+ TCR	520	(China) Yang Zheng		TBC	
(China) Par by 300+	Lynk & Co 03+ TCR	602	(China) Wang Tao		TBC	
(China) Autohome by 300+ Team	Lynk & Co 03+ TCR	61	(China) Liang Qi		TBC	

Icon	Status
W	TCR World Tour entries not eligible to score points in the local series

== Results ==
Rnd.		Circuit	Pole position	Fastest lap	Winning driver	Winning team
1	1	(China) Shanghai International Circuit	(China) Sunny Wong	(China) Jason Zhang Zhi Qiang	(China) Jason Zhang Zhi Qiang	(China) Lynk & Co Teamwork
1	2	(China) Shanghai International Circuit		(China) David Zhu Dai Wei	(China) David Zhu Dai Wei	(China) Lynk & Co Teamwork
2	3	(China) Ningbo International Circuit	(China) Li Ka Hei	(China) Frederick Lee Fu Kwan	(China) Jason Zhang Zhi Qiang	(China) Lynk & Co Teamwork
2	4	(China) Ningbo International Circuit		(China) Liang Qi	(China) Liang Qi	(China) Autohome by 300+ Team
3	5	(China) Ordos International Circuit	(China) Zhi Qiang Zhang	(China) Zhi Qiang Zhang	(China) Zhi Qiang Zhang (Note: David Zhu Dai Wei was the first to cross the finish line but received a 5-second penalty for a jump start.)	(China) Lynk & Co Teamwork
3	6	(China) Ordos International Circuit		(China) Frederick Lee Fu Kwan	(China) Chuang Yan	(China) Autohome by 300+ Team
4	7	(China) Shanghai International Circuit	(China) Sun Ju Ran	(China) Zhi Qiang Zhang	(China) Lo Sze Ho	(China) Evolve Racing
4	8	(China) Shanghai International Circuit		(China) Lo Sze Ho	(China) Lo Sze Ho	(China) Evolve Racing
5	9	(China) Chengdu Tianfu International Circuit				
5	10	(China) Chengdu Tianfu International Circuit				
6	11	(China) Zhejiang International Circuit				
6	12	(China) Zhejiang International Circuit				
NC	NC1	(Malaysia) Sepang International Circuit				
NC	NC2	(Malaysia) Sepang International Circuit				

== Championship standings ==
Unlike the previous year, each victory awards 600 points, with a maximum of 8,100 points achievable in the season. Points are awarded down to the last-placed finisher; however, no points are given for DNF, DNS, or DSQ.

Scoring system

Position	1st	2nd	3rd	4th	5th	6th	7th	8th	9th	10th	11th	12th	13th	14th	Rest
Qualifying	150	105	75	60	45	30	15								
Races	600	525	450	405	360	315	14	270	225	195	165	105	75	45	15
