= 2023 TCR China Touring Car Championship =

The 2023 TCR China Touring Car Championship season was the sixth season of the TCR's Chinese Touring Car Championship.

== Race Calendar ==
The 2023 schedule was announced on 10 May 2023, with six events scheduled.

Rnd.		Circuit	Date	Supporting
1	1	(China) Shanghai International Circuit, Shanghai	12–14 May	GT Super Sprint Challenge
1	2	(China) Shanghai International Circuit, Shanghai	12–14 May	GT Super Sprint Challenge
2	3	(China) Zhejiang International Circuit, Shaoxing	23–25 June	Stand-alone event
2	4	(China) Zhejiang International Circuit, Shaoxing	23–25 June	Stand-alone event
3	5	(China) Zhuzhou International Circuit, Hunan	14–16 July	Stand-alone event
3	6	(China) Zhuzhou International Circuit, Hunan	14–16 July	Stand-alone event
4	7	(China) Shanghai International Circuit, Shanghai	8–10 September	Lamborghini Super Trofeo Asia; GT Super Sprint Challenge
4	8	(China) Shanghai International Circuit, Shanghai	8–10 September	Lamborghini Super Trofeo Asia; GT Super Sprint Challenge
5	9	(China) Zhuzhou International Circuit, Hunan	27–29 October	Formula 4 South East Asia Championship
5	10	(China) Zhuzhou International Circuit, Hunan	27–29 October	Formula 4 South East Asia Championship
6	11	Guia Circuit, Macau	16–19 November	Macau Grand Prix; FIA GT World Cup; TCR World Tour
6	12	Guia Circuit, Macau	16–19 November	Macau Grand Prix; FIA GT World Cup; TCR World Tour

== Teams and drivers ==
Team	Car	No.	Drivers	Class	Rounds	Ref.
(China) Shell Teamwork Lynk & Co Racing	Lynk & Co 03 TCR	1	(China) David Zhu		All	
(China) Shell Teamwork Lynk & Co Racing	Lynk & Co 03 TCR	12	(Hong Kong) Sunny Wong		All	
(China) Shell Teamwork Lynk & Co Racing	Lynk & Co 03 TCR	36	(China) Jason Zhang		All	
(China) Shell Teamwork Lynk & Co Racing	Lynk & Co 03 TCR	92	(China) Zhu Yuanjie	Am	1, 6	
(China) Shell Teamwork Lynk & Co Racing	Lynk & Co 03 TCR	155	(China) Ma Qinghua		5	
(China) Shell Teamwork Lynk & Co Racing	Lynk & Co 03 TCR	492	(China) Geng Rui	Am	2, 4	
(China) Shell Teamwork Lynk & Co Racing	Lynk & Co 03 TCR	887	(Hong Kong) Aaron Kwok	Am	5–6	
(South Korea) Hyundai N Team	Hyundai Elantra N TCR	3	(Hong Kong) Andy Yan		All	
(South Korea) Hyundai N Team	Hyundai Elantra N TCR	7	(China) Martin Cao		All	
(South Korea) Hyundai N Team	Hyundai Elantra N TCR	22	(China) Rainey He		All	
(China) TianShi Racing Team	Audi RS 3 LMS TCR (2021)	6	(China) Wu Wenfa	Am	1–5	
(China) TianShi Racing Team	Audi RS 3 LMS TCR (2021)	26	(Macau) Filipe de Souza		4	
(China) TianShi Racing Team	Audi RS 3 LMS TCR (2021)	666	(China) Lü Zhenming	Am	1–5	
(China) Audi Sport 326 Racing Team	Audi RS 3 LMS TCR (2021)	11	(China) Liu Zichen	Am	All	
(China) Audi Sport 326 Racing Team	Audi RS 3 LMS TCR (2021)	51	(China) Wu Yifan		All	
(China) Audi Sport 326 Racing Team	Audi RS 3 LMS TCR (2021)	82	(China) Lai Jingwen	Am	1, 4–6	
(China) Audi Sport 326 Racing Team	Audi RS 3 LMS TCR (2021)	96	(China) Xiao Kunpeng	Am	5	
(China) Audi Sport 326 Racing Team	Audi RS 3 LMS TCR (2021)	98	(China) Zhao Di	Am	2	
(China) Audi Sport 326 Racing Team	Audi RS 3 LMS TCR (2021)	118	(China) Huang Kuisheng	Am	4	
(China) Audi Sport 326 Racing Team	Audi RS 3 LMS TCR (2021)	555	(China) Zhu Yan	Am	5	
(China) Audi Sport 326 Racing Team	Audi RS 3 LMS TCR (2017)	24	(China) Sheng Jiacheng	Am	1	
(China) Audi Sport 326 Racing Team	Audi RS 3 LMS TCR (2017)	56	(China) Zhu Shengdong	Am	3	
(China) Jiangmen Xingrui Racing Team 3 (China) Starcars Racing 1	Honda Civic Type R TCR (FK8)	14	(Taiwan) Huang Xizhan	Am	3–4	
(China) Jiangmen Xingrui Racing Team 3 (China) Starcars Racing 1	Honda Civic Type R TCR (FK8)	33	(China) Hu Jiaxin	Am	1	
(China) Jiangmen Xingrui Racing Team 3 (China) Starcars Racing 1	Audi RS 3 LMS TCR (2021)	33	(China) Hu Jiaxin	Am	2–4	
(China) Jinyutu GYT Racing	MG 6 X-Power TCR	15	(China) Wei Pengda	Am	1	
(China) Jinyutu GYT Racing	Audi RS 3 LMS TCR (2021)	95	(China) Hu Heng	Am	3	
(China) Jinyutu GYT Racing	Audi RS 3 LMS TCR (2021)	96	(China) Xiao Kunpeng	Am	2	
(China) Jinyutu GYT Racing	Audi RS 3 LMS TCR (2021)	777	(China) Zheng Wancheng		1	
(China) Jinyutu GYT Racing	Audi RS 3 LMS TCR (2021)	171	(China) Zhang Hongyu	Am	4–5	
(China) Hyundai N Team Z.Speed	Hyundai Elantra N TCR	17	(China) Yang Xiaowei		All	
(China) Hyundai N Team Z.Speed	Hyundai Elantra N TCR	18	(China) Zhang Zhendong		All	
(China) Hyundai N Team Z.Speed	Hyundai Elantra N TCR	101	(Republic of Ireland) Max Hart		All	
(China) Hyundai N Team Z.Speed Community	Hyundai Elantra N TCR	97	(China) Yang Haojie	Am	All	
(China) Hyundai N Team Z.Speed Community	Hyundai Elantra N TCR	521	(China) Jiang Nan	Am	All	
(China) Hyundai N Team Z.Speed Community	Hyundai i30 N TCR	111	(China) Li Wengji	Am	1–5	
(China) Fancy JK Team	Lynk & Co 03 TCR	21	(Hong Kong) Paul Poon	Am	1–5	
(China) Fancy JK Team	Lynk & Co 03 TCR	27	(China) Yan Chuang		1, 3, 5	
(China) Fancy JK Team	Audi RS 3 LMS TCR (2021)	65	(China) Lin Chenghua	Am	All	
(China) Fancy JK Team	Lynk & Co 03 TCR	92	(China) Zhu Yuanjie	Am	2–5	
(China) BAS Racing	Audi RS 3 LMS TCR (2021)	25	(China) Ren Chao	Am	All	
(China) BAS Racing	Hyundai Elantra N TCR	72	(China) Zhou Haowen	Am	All	
(Belgium) Comtoyou Racing	Audi RS 3 LMS TCR (2021)	26	(Macau) Filipe de Souza		6	
(Hong Kong) Evolve Racing	Hyundai Elantra N TCR	28	(Hong Kong) Lo Sze Ho		4	
(China) SparkSpark Racing	Honda Civic Type R TCR (FK2) 3 Honda Civic Type R TCR (FL5) 4	37	(China) Zhou Yunjie	Am	All	
(Macau) Dongfeng Honda MacPro Racing Team	Honda Civic Type R TCR (FK8) 1 Honda Civic Type R TCR (FL5) 5	55	(China) Martin Xie		All	
(Macau) Dongfeng Honda MacPro Racing Team	Honda Civic Type R TCR (FK8) 1 Honda Civic Type R TCR (FL5) 5	77	(United Kingdom) Jack Young		All	
(Macau) Dongfeng Honda MacPro Racing Team	Honda Civic Type R TCR (FL5)	66	(Macau) André Couto		2–3, 5–6	
(Macau) Dongfeng Honda MacPro Racing Team	Honda Civic Type R TCR (FL5)	99	(Hong Kong) Daniel Wu	Am	4	
(China) 109 Racing	Honda Civic Type R TCR (FK8)	88	(China) Deng Baowei		2–3	
(China) Norris Racing	Honda Civic Type R TCR (FK8)	126	(Hong Kong) Chan Chiwai	Am	All	
(China) Norris Racing	Honda Civic Type R TCR (FK2)	127	(Hong Kong) Chan Chunleung	Am	All	

Key
Am	Am Cup

== Results ==
Rnd.		Circuit	Date	Pole position	Fastest lap	Winning driver	Winning team	Am Cup winner
1	1	(China) Shanghai International Circuit, Shanghai	12–14 May	(China) Jason Zhang	(China) Martin Cao	(China) Martin Cao	(South Korea) Hyundai N Team	(China) Liu Zichen
1	2	(China) Shanghai International Circuit, Shanghai	12–14 May		(China) Jason Zhang	(China) David Zhu	(China) Shell Teamwork Lynk & Co Racing	(China) Lin Chenghua
2	1	(China) Zhejiang International Circuit, Shaoxing	23–25 June	(China) Jason Zhang	(United Kingdom) Jack Young	(China) Jason Zhang	(China) Shell Teamwork Lynk & Co Racing	(China) Zhu Yuanjie
2	2	(China) Zhejiang International Circuit, Shaoxing	23–25 June		(United Kingdom) Jack Young	(China) Martin Cao	(South Korea) Hyundai N Team	(China) Zhu Yuanjie
3	1	(China) Zhuzhou International Circuit, Beijing	14–16 July	(China) Martin Xie	(United Kingdom) Jack Young	(China) Martin Cao	(South Korea) Hyundai N Team	(China) Hu Heng
3	2	(China) Zhuzhou International Circuit, Beijing	14–16 July		(China) Martin Xie	(United Kingdom) Jack Young	(Macau) Dongfeng Honda MacPro Racing Team	(China) Liu Zichen
4	1	(China) Shanghai International Circuit, Shanghai	8–10 September	(China) Martin Xie	(United Kingdom) Jack Young	(United Kingdom) Jack Young	(Macau) Dongfeng Honda MacPro Racing Team	(China) Liu Zichen
4	2	(China) Shanghai International Circuit, Shanghai	8–10 September		(China) Martin Xie	(Hong Kong) Andy Yan	(South Korea) Hyundai N Team	(China) Liu Zichen
5	1	(China) Zhuzhou International Circuit, Hunan	27–29 October	(United Kingdom) Jack Young	(United Kingdom) Jack Young	(United Kingdom) Jack Young	(Macau) Dongfeng Honda MacPro Racing Team	(China) Liu Zichen
5	2	(China) Zhuzhou International Circuit, Hunan	27–29 October		(China) Ma Qinghua	(China) Ma Qinghua	(China) Shell Teamwork Lynk & Co Racing	(Hong Kong) Paul Poon
6	1	Guia Circuit, Macau	17–19 November	(Hong Kong) Andy Yan (Note: Andy Yan claimed the pole position, however no bonus points were awarded and combined FP1 and FP2 times were used to determine the grid due to a cancelled qualifying session.)	(Hong Kong) Andy Yan	(China) Martin Cao	(South Korea) Hyundai N Team	(China) Lin Chenghua
6	2	Guia Circuit, Macau	17–19 November		(United Kingdom) Jack Young	(Republic of Ireland) Max Hart	(China) Hyundai N Team Z.Speed	(China) Lin Chenghua

== Championship standings ==
=== Drivers' championship ===
Scoring systems

Position	1st	2nd	3rd	4th	5th	6th	7th	8th	9th	10th
Qualifying	5	4	3	2	1	—				
Races	25	18	15	12	10	8	6	4	2	1

Pos.	Driver	SHA1 (China)		ZHE (China)		ZHZ1 (China)		SHA2 (China)		ZHZ2 (China)		MAC (Macau)		Pts.
1	(China) Martin Cao	1^{4}	Ret	5	1	1^{2}	3	6	3	4^{4}	5	1^{2}	Ret	178
2	(United Kingdom) Jack Young	2^{3}	Ret	**7**^{1}	2	6^{3}	1	1^{2}	9	**1**^{1}	4	Ret^{5}	Ret	159
3	(China) Jason Zhang	**4**^{1}	4	1^{2}	7	14^{4}	4	5	4	2^{3}	7	5	6	145
4	(China) Martin Xie	14	7	10^{3}	10	**2**^{1}	2	**2**^{1}	21	Ret	27	2	2	111
5	(China) David Zhu	3^{2}	1	4	3	Ret	Ret	3	7	19^{5}	Ret	6	12	101
6	(Republic of Ireland) Max Hart	Ret	Ret	9	6	4	7	Ret	2	6	15	4	1	91
7	(Hong Kong) Andy Yan	13	2	8	4	11	6	Ret	1	13	16	**8**^{1}	5	81
8	(China) Zhang Zhendong	8	23	3^{5}	8	3^{5}	Ret	7^{5}	5	Ret	6	10^{4}	4	78
9	(Macau) André Couto			2^{4}	9	27	24			5^{2}	2	7^{3}	Ret	60
10	(China) Rainey He	7	11	6	5	Ret	8	9	11	7	3	9	7	59
11	(Hong Kong) Sunny Wong	6	3	13	12	5	5	13	Ret	9	Ret	11	9	47
12	(China) Yang Xiaowei	10	5	12	14	Ret	11	8	Ret	11	11	3	3	45
13	(China) Ma Qinghua									3	1			40
14	(China) Wu Yifan	16	6	11	11	7	10	4^{4}	Ret	Ret	10	Ret	8	34
15	(China) Liu Zichen	11	12	Ret	17	9	9	11	6	8	Ret	Ret	11	16
16	(China) Zheng Wancheng	5^{5}	24											11
17	(China) Zhu Yuanjie	18	8	14	13	10	16	14	10	10	9	Ret	13	9
18	(Hong Kong) Paul Poon	12	10	17	Ret	13	Ret	12	Ret	Ret	8			5
19	(China) Hu Heng					8	12							4
20	(Taiwan) Huang Xizhan					22	DNS	Ret	8					4
21	(China) Lin Chenghua	DNS	9	24	Ret	Ret	Ret	19	16	16	24	13	10	3
22	(China) Zhang Hongyu							15^{3}	12	Ret	Ret			3
23	(China) Yan Chuang	9	21			12	18			12	Ret			2
24	(Hong Kong) Lo Sze Ho							10	14					1
25	(Macau) Filipe de Souza							24	13			12	14	0
26	(China) Yang Haojie	21	17	22	21	17	17	27	19	18	12	16	18	0
27	(China) Ren Chao	19	13	27	20	24	14	17	Ret	24	13	21	20	0
28	(China) Jiang Nan	27	16	20	27	18	13	20	Ret	25	25	18	21	0
29	(China) Wu Wenfa	15	22	15	16	Ret	Ret	18	Ret	14	20			0
30	(China) Lai Jingwen	22	18					28	17	WD	WD	14	17	0
31	(China) Xiao Kunpeng			18	19					20	14			0
32	(China) Li Wengji	Ret	14	26	24	20	20	23	24	23	18			0
33	(Hong Kong) Chan Chiwai	20	15	21	22	26	22	22	15	Ret	17	19	15	0
34	(China) Zhou Yunjie	24	25	30	23	23	15	30	27	15	21	Ret	16	0
35	(China) Deng Baowei			16	15	16	21							0
36	(China) Hu Jiaxin	Ret	Ret	19	28	15	Ret	25	18					0
37	(Hong Kong) Chan Chunleung	23	19	Ret	26	19	23	26	26	21	23	15	Ret	0
38	(China) Zhou Haowen	25	Ret	25	Ret	25	Ret	16	25	22	Ret	20	19	0
39	(China) Zhu Yan									17	19			0
40	(Hong Kong) Aaron Kwok									Ret	26	17	Ret	0
41	(China) Wei Pengda	17	Ret											0
42	(China) Geng Rui			29	18			Ret	Ret					0
43	(China) Zhu Shengdong					21	19							0
44	(China) Lü Zhenming	26	20	28	25	Ret	Ret	31	20	Ret	22			0
45	(China) Huang Kuisheng							21	22					0
46	(Hong Kong) Daniel Wu							29	23					0
47	(China) Zhao Di			23	Ret									0
48	(China) Sheng Jiacheng	28	26											0
Pos.	Driver	SHA1 (China)		ZHE (China)		ZHZ1 (China)		SHA2 (China)		ZHZ2 (China)		MAC (Macau)		Pts.

Colour	Result
Gold	Winner
Silver	Second place
Bronze	Third place
Green	Points classification
Blue	Non-points classification
Blue	Non-classified finish (NC)
Purple	Retired, not classified (Ret)
Red	Did not qualify (DNQ)
Red	Did not pre-qualify (DNPQ)
Black	Disqualified (DSQ)
White	Did not start (DNS)
White	Withdrew (WD)
White	Race cancelled (C)
Blank	Did not practice (DNP)
Blank	Did not arrive (DNA)
Blank	Excluded (EX)

**Bold** – Pole Italics – Fastest Lap
