= 2022 TCR Asia Series =

Car racing event

The 2022 TCR Asia Series season was the seventh season of the TCR Asia Series.

== Race Calendar ==
The provisional 2022 schedule was announced on 18 December 2018, with seven events scheduled. However, After multiple postponements due to the current COVID restrictions in China. The final revised calendar was announced on 4 July 2022, with six events scheduled. Before November, the calendar was revised:

Rnd.		Circuit	Date	Supporting
1	1	(China) Zhuzhou International Circuit, Beijing	28–29 July	China Touring Car Championship; Porsche Carrera Cup Asia
1	2	(China) Zhuzhou International Circuit, Beijing	28–29 July	China Touring Car Championship; Porsche Carrera Cup Asia
2	3	(China) Zhuzhou International Circuit, Beijing	30–31 July	China Touring Car Championship; Porsche Carrera Cup Asia
2	4	(China) Zhuzhou International Circuit, Beijing	30–31 July	China Touring Car Championship; Porsche Carrera Cup Asia
3	5	(China) Zhejiang International Circuit, Shaoxing	5 November	China Touring Car Championship
3	6	(China) Zhejiang International Circuit, Shaoxing	5 November	China Touring Car Championship
4	7	(China) Zhejiang International Circuit, Shaoxing	6 November	China Touring Car Championship
4	8	(China) Zhejiang International Circuit, Shaoxing	6 November	China Touring Car Championship
5	9	Guia Circuit, Macau	18–20 November	China GT Championship; China Touring Car Championship; F4 Chinese Championship; Macau Challenge Cup; Macau GT Cup; Macau Guia Race
5	10	Guia Circuit, Macau	18–20 November	China GT Championship; China Touring Car Championship; F4 Chinese Championship; Macau Challenge Cup; Macau GT Cup; Macau Guia Race
6	11	(China) Shanghai Tianma Circuit, Shanghai	8 December	China Touring Car Championship
6	12	(China) Shanghai Tianma Circuit, Shanghai	8 December	China Touring Car Championship

== Teams and Drivers ==
Team	Car	No.	Drivers	Class	Rounds	Ref.
(China) Shell Teamwork Lynk & Co Racing	Lynk & Co 03 TCR	1	(China) Jason Zhang		All	
(China) Shell Teamwork Lynk & Co Racing	Lynk & Co 03 TCR	9	(China) David Zhu		All	
(China) Shell Teamwork Lynk & Co Racing	Lynk & Co 03 TCR	12	(Hong Kong) Sunny Wong		All	
(China) Xian Tianshihui Team	Volkswagen Golf GTI TCR	2	(China) Wu Pei Zhi		1	
(China) Xian Tianshihui Team	Volkswagen Golf GTI TCR	6	(China) Zeng Xiaoxiao	G	2	
(United Kingdom) Team MG XPower	MG 5 X-Power TCR	5	(China) Juan Zhu		1–4, 6	
(United Kingdom) Team MG XPower	MG 5 X-Power TCR	7	(China) Martin Cao		All	
(United Kingdom) Team MG XPower	MG 5 X-Power TCR	18	(China) Zhendong Zhang		All	
(United Kingdom) Team MG XPower	MG 5 X-Power TCR	20	(Macau) Rodolfo Ávila		All	
(United Kingdom) Team MG XPower	MG 5 X-Power TCR	79	(United Kingdom) Robert Huff	G	5	
(Macau) Elegant Racing Team	Volkswagen Golf GTI TCR	10	(China) Mai Yi Bo		1–2	
(Macau) Elegant Racing Team	Volkswagen Golf GTI TCR	136	(Hong Kong) Chin Man Kit	G	6	
(China) Audi Sport 326 MMK Racing Team	Audi RS 3 LMS TCR (2021)	11	(China) Liu Zi Chen		All	
(China) Audi Sport 326 MMK Racing Team	Audi RS 3 LMS TCR (2021)	51	(China) Wu Yifan		All	
(China) Audi Sport 326 MMK Racing Team	Audi RS 3 LMS TCR (2021)	999	(China) Chen Xiao Ke		1–4, 6	
(China) 326 Auto Group	Audi RS 3 LMS TCR (2017)	56	(China) Jiang Wei		2, 6	
(China) 326 Auto Group	Audi RS 3 LMS TCR (2017)	125	(Malaysia) Hong Khor Jing	G	6	
(China) Hyundai N Team Z.Speed	Hyundai Elantra N TCR	17	(China) Yang Xiao Wei		3–6	
(China) Hyundai N Team Z.Speed	Hyundai Elantra N TCR	44	(China) Samuel Qiu		All	
(China) Hyundai N Team Z.Speed	Hyundai Elantra N TCR	188	(China) Li Xuanyu		3–4, 6	
(Taiwan) Kang Shi Racing Team	Audi RS 3 LMS TCR (2017)	22	(Taiwan) Liao Yang	G	5	
(China) Fancy Team	Lynk & Co 03 TCR	27	(China) Yan Chuang		1–6	
(China) Fancy Team	Lynk & Co 03 TCR	111	(China) Pyae Phyo Tun	G	6	
(Hong Kong) CPointer Racing with FRD	Ford Focus CTCC	28	(China) Yang Shuo	G	1	
(Hong Kong) CPointer Racing with FRD	Ford Focus CTCC	33	(China) Bai Ya Xin	G	1	
(China) Trackfun	Lynk & Co 03 TCR	30	(China) Cai Hong Yu		1–2, 6	
(China) Trackfun	Lynk & Co 03 TCR	145	(China) Zhang Jingrui	G	6	
(China) Bas x Z.Speed	Audi RS 3 LMS TCR (2021)	37	(China) Zhou Hao Wen		3–6	
(China) 610 Osborg Z.Speed	Audi RS 3 LMS TCR (2017)	55	(China) Sun Ang Ning		1–2, 6	
(China) 610 Osborg Z.Speed	Audi RS 3 LMS TCR (2017)	77	(China) Yang Xiao Wei		1–2	
(China) 610 Osborg Z.Speed	Hyundai i30 N TCR	66	(China) Li Weng Ji		1–4	
(China) Motve & Z.Speed	Volkswagen Golf GTI TCR	66	(China) Li Weng Ji		6	
(China) SAIC Volkswagen 333 Team	Volkswagen Lamando L CTCC	58	(China) Gao Hua Yang	G	All	
(China) SAIC Volkswagen 333 Team	Volkswagen Lamando L CTCC	63	(China) Nathan Lu	G	All	
(China) SAIC Volkswagen 333 Team	Volkswagen Lamando L CTCC	71	(China) Jiang Tengyi	G	All	
(China) SAIC Volkswagen 333 Team	Volkswagen Lamando L CTCC	555	(China) Martin Xie	G	All	
(China) QMA Motorsports	Audi RS 3 LMS TCR (2017)	65	(China) Lin Cheng Hua		3–6	
(China) QMA Motorsports	Audi RS 3 LMS TCR (2017)	69	(China) Kai Tian		All	
(China) ZZRT	Audi RS 3 LMS TCR (2021)	89	(China) Ruan Cun Fan		1–4, 6	
(China) Kingstone Racing	Volkswagen Golf GTI TCR	91	(China) Yao Li		3–4, 6	
(China) Kingstone Racing	MG 6 X-Power TCR	91	(China) Yao Li		1–2	
(China) Kingstone Racing	MG 6 X-Power TCR	92	(China) Yuan Jie Zhu		1–2, 6	
(China) Dongfeng Kia Racing	KIA Forte K3 2.0T	95	(China) Hu Heng	G	2	
(China) Pu Shu	KIA Forte K3 2.0T	96	(China) Pu Shu	G	1, 6	
(China) MotorSport Crew	Honda Civic Type R TCR (FK2)	98	(China) Tim Zeng		1–2, 6	
Non TCR entries
(China) Wuhan 7 Speed	Volkswagen Scirocco	110	(China) Tian Hongyu	G	2, 6	
(China) Wuhan 7 Speed	Mazda Axela	908	(China) Hong Kiang	G	2, 6	

Icon	Class
G	Guest drivers ineligible to score points

== Results and standings ==
=== Season summary ===
Rnd.		Circuit/Location	Pole position	Fastest lap	Winning driver	Winning team
1	1	(China) Zhuzhou International Circuit	(China) Jason Zhang	(China) Jason Zhang	(China) Jason Zhang	(China) Shell Teamwork Lynk & Co Racing
1	2	(China) Zhuzhou International Circuit	(China) Jason Zhang	(China) Jason Zhang	(Hong Kong) Sunny Wong	(China) Shell Teamwork Lynk & Co Racing
2	3	(China) Zhuzhou International Circuit	(China) David Zhu	(China) David Zhu	(China) David Zhu	(China) Shell Teamwork Lynk & Co Racing
2	4	(China) Zhuzhou International Circuit	(Macau) Rodolfo Ávila	(Macau) Rodolfo Ávila	(Macau) Rodolfo Ávila	(China) Team MG XPower
3	5	(China) Zhejiang International Circuit	(China) Martin Xie	(China) David Zhu	(China) David Zhu	(China) Shell Teamwork Lynk & Co Racing
3	6	(China) Zhejiang International Circuit	(Macau) Rodolfo Ávila	(China) Jason Zhang	(Macau) Rodolfo Ávila	(China) Team MG XPower
4	7	(China) Zhejiang International Circuit	(China) Jason Zhang	(China) Jason Zhang	(China) Jason Zhang	(China) Shell Teamwork Lynk & Co Racing
4	8	(China) Zhejiang International Circuit	(Hong Kong) Sunny Wong	(China) Jason Zhang	(China) Gao Hua Yang	(China) SAIC Volkswagen 333 Team
5	9	(Macau) Guia Circuit	(United Kingdom) Robert Huff	(United Kingdom) Robert Huff	(United Kingdom) Robert Huff	(China) Team MG XPower
5	10	(Macau) Guia Circuit	(China) Gao Hua Yang	(United Kingdom) Robert Huff	(China) Jason Zhang	(China) Shell Teamwork Lynk & Co Racing
6	11	(China) Shanghai Tianma Circuit	(China) Jason Zhang	(China) Jason Zhang	(China) Jason Zhang	(China) Shell Teamwork Lynk & Co Racing
6	12	(China) Shanghai Tianma Circuit	(China) Jason Zhang	(Hong Kong) Sunny Wong	(Hong Kong) Sunny Wong	(China) Shell Teamwork Lynk & Co Racing

==== Drivers' standings ====
Scoring system

1st	2nd	3rd	4th	5th	6th	7th	8th	9th	10th	PP	FL
25	18	15	12	10	8	6	4	2	1	**0**	0

Pos.	Driver	ZHZ1 (China)		ZHZ2 (China)		ZHE1 (China)		ZHE2 (China)		MAC (Macau)		TIA (China)		Pts.
1	(China) David Zhu	4	16	**1**	3	1	7	4	6	2	5	2	4	166
2	(Hong Kong) Sunny Wong	3	1	Ret	2	3	14	5	**2**	3	Ret	4	1	152
3	(China) Jason Zhang	**1**	**2**	6	6	Ret	6	**1**	17	4	1	**1**	**8**	141
4	(China) Yan Chuang	6	3	7	9	4	2	11	4	14	10	6	2	120
5	(Macau) Rodolfo Ávila	Ret	Ret	5	**1**	Ret	**1**	Ret	7	7	4	9	6	85
6	(China) Wu Yifan	9	Ret	8	7	6	9	8	10	10	8	3	Ret	66
7	(China) Martin Cao	2	5	Ret	13	8	DNS	Ret	DNS	6	6	5	3	60
8	(China) Juan Carlos Zhu	16	10	11	10	2	4	Ret	8			Ret	Wth	56
9	(China) Ruan Cun Fan	17	4	9	20	Ret	11	7	9			8	5	52
10	(China) Liu Zi Chen	12	Ret	3	14	Ret	12	10	11	13	Ret	10	7	42
11	(China) Yang Xiao Wei	8	Ret	14	12	5	8	DNS	DNS	11	7	14	Ret	31
12	(China) Zhang Zhen Dong	11	DNS	12	8	Ret	10	6	Ret	5	11	12	9	29
13	(China) Chen Xiao Ke	Ret	DNS	4	Ret	Ret	13	9	12			11	Ret	26
14	(China) Cai Hong Yu	7	Ret	Ret	Ret							13	13	11
15	(China) Samuel Qiu	15	9	15	17	13	15	13	DNS	18	15	15	12	8
16	(China) Zhou Hao Wen					11	20	18	16	17	14	7	Ret	7
17	(China) Zhu Yuan Jie	13	11	13	18							17	15	6
18	(China) Li Weng Ji	21	15	Ret	21	9	21	17	DNS			NPQ	Ret	4
19	(China) Li Xuanyu					10	19	12	DNS			19	16	3
20	(China) Kai Tian	Ret	12	Ret	Ret	12	17	16	14	16	13	Ret	10	3
21	(China) Sun Ang Ning	14	13	17	15							Ret	17	1
22	(China) Lin Cheng Hua					Ret	16	14	13	Ret	DNS	Ret	11	1
23	(China) Yao Li	Ret	14	18	19	DNS	DNS	15	15			16	18	0
24	(China) Mai Yi Bo	20	18	16	16									0
25	(China) Wu Pei Zhi	22	17											0
26	(China) Tim Zeng	19	DNS	19	Ret							18	14	0
27	(China) Jiang Wei			Ret	DNS							26	24	0
CTCC/Guest drivers ineligible to score points
—	(United Kingdom) Robert Huff									**1**	2			0
—	(China) Gao Hua Yang	Ret	6	10	11	7	18	3	1	8	**3**	22	20	0
—	(China) Martin Xie	10	7	2	4	**Ret**	3	2	3	9	Ret	20	21	0
—	(China) Jiang Tengyi	5	8	Ret	5	DNS	DNS	DNS	DNS	DNS	Ret	23	23	0
—	(China) Nathan Lu	Ret	DNS	DNS	DNS	14	5	Ret	5	12	9	21	28	0
—	(Taiwan) Liao Yang									15	12			0
—	(China) Pu Shu	18	DNS									24	19	0
—	(China) Zeng Xiaoxiao			20	22									0
—	(China) Tian Hongyu			Ret	Ret							25	22	0
—	(Hong Kong) Chin Man Kit											Ret	25	0
—	(China) Hong Kiang			Ret	DNS							27	26	0
—	(Malaysia) Hong Khor Jing											29	27	0
—	(China) Bai Ya Xin	Ret	DNS											0
—	(China) Yang Shuo	Ret	DNS											0
—	(China) Hu Heng			Ret	DNS									0
—	(China) Pyae Phyo Tun											Ret	DNS	0
—	(China) Zhang Jingrui											DSQ	DSQ	0
Pos.	Driver	ZHZ1 (China)		ZHZ2 (China)		ZHE1 (China)		ZHE2 (China)		MAC (Macau)		TIA (China)		Pts.

Colour	Result
Gold	Winner
Silver	Second place
Bronze	Third place
Green	Points classification
Blue	Non-points classification
Blue	Non-classified finish (NC)
Purple	Retired, not classified (Ret)
Red	Did not qualify (DNQ)
Red	Did not pre-qualify (DNPQ)
Black	Disqualified (DSQ)
White	Did not start (DNS)
White	Withdrew (WD)
White	Race cancelled (C)
Blank	Did not practice (DNP)
Blank	Did not arrive (DNA)
Blank	Excluded (EX)

**Bold** – Pole
Italics – Fastest Lap
† — Did not finish but classified
