= Samuel Hsieh =

Hong Kong racer (born 1978)

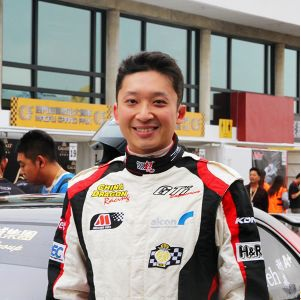
- Hsieh at the 2012 59th Macau Grand Prix
- Nationality: Hong Kong
- Born: 26 July 1978 (age 48) Hong Kong

TCR China career
- Debut season: 2017
- Current team: Teamwork Motorsport
- Categorisation: FIA Bronze
- Car number: 26
- Starts: 5

Previous series
- 2016 2015 2014 2013 2009–2012, 2014: China GT Championship; China Touring Car Championship; Chinese Racing Cup; Touring Car Series in Asia; Hong Kong Touring Car Championship

Awards
- 2013: HK Driver Bronze Award by Hong Kong Automobile Association

Samuel Hsieh (Traditional Chinese: 謝森) (born 26 July 1978) is a Hong Kong touring car racing driver. He is currently competing in TCR China for Teamwork Motorsport in a Volkswagen Golf GTi TCR.

== Early years ==
Hsieh made his debut in 2004 at the age of 24 at Zhuhai International Circuit, and entered a weekend of the Hong Kong Touring Car Championship with a Honda Civic.

Due to financial reasons, Hsieh was yet to race again until 2009, when he sold his road car to acquire a used Group N Honda Integra race car to make his full season return.

== Career ==
=== Hong Kong Touring Car Championship (2009-2012) ===
Hsieh took part in N2000 Class with China Dragon Racing; he also raced in Macau Grand Prix’s supporting race the same year.

In 2010/2011, Hsieh continued in Hong Kong's championship and the Macau Grand Prix. He also had one round appearance at the China Touring Car Championship in 2010, Zhuhai.

In 2012, Hsieh switched to 'Road Sport', a category for heavily modified road cars held by Hong Kong Automobile Association, where he worked with China Dragon Racing by becoming their test/race driver for the team's Subaru Impreza. He entered the season with just two races, finishing both on the podium.

=== Touring Car Series in Asia (2013) ===
Hsieh set foot into a regional championship with China Dragon Racing, using their Subaru at Malaysia’s Sepang Circuit, and finished the season second overall in the championship with four podiums.

=== Return to the Hong Kong Touring Car Championship (2014) ===
In 2014, after two years spent in Road Sport, Hsieh was set to return to race Group N for Teamwork Motorsport, where he had three wins and finished second in the championship, just 2 points shy of taking the season title.

=== Chinese Racing Cup (2014) ===
A runner-up finish in Hong Kong's championship rewarded him with the opportunity to represent Hong Kong Automobile Association to race against other ASN drivers in the Greater China Region. He claimed victory at the round in Macau, and finished sixth in the series.

=== China Touring Car Championship (2015-2016) ===
Hsieh joined the grid of the China Touring Car Championship in 2015, driving a Citroën C-Elysée run by Teamwork Motorsport, whilst still chasing funds to compete in the full season. He scored two front row starts including one pole position among his three appearances. At the end of the season, he was able to return to the championship for a one-off duty with factory outfit Changan Ford Racing Team.

In 2016, Hsieh landed a half season drive with another factory-supported team, Haima Z1 Racing. He outscored his teammates in the drivers' standings, but had yet to secure the drive for the rest of the season.

=== China GT Championship (2016) ===
Hsieh made his GT debut in the inaugural season of the China GT Championship, driving an Audi R8 LMS for Beijing outfit Ling Rui 300+. He finished as runner-up in the GTC drivers' standings.

=== TCR China (2017) ===
Hsieh joined hands with Teamwork Motorsport in the inaugural season of TCR China, pairing up with Macanese driver Filipe de Souza in a Volkswagen Golf GTi TCR.

== Macau Grand Prix (2009-2014) ==
Hsieh has competed at their supporting races on six occasions; from 2009 to 2011 with China Dragon Racing in a Honda Integra, and in 2012 and 2013 in their Subaru Impreza.

Hsieh was awarded the 'Hong Kong Driver Bronze Award' by the Hong Kong Automobile Association in 2013, by finishing third among Hong Kong drivers in the 'Macau Road Sport Challenge' at the 60th Macau Grand Prix.

Hsieh won the Macau round of the Chinese Racing Cup in 2014 with a Senova D70.

== Endurance Racing (2012-2016) ==
Hsieh participated in endurance races in the Guangdong International Circuit regularly, he raced events from 3 hours to 12 hours with Peugeot 307, Volkswagen Scirocco, Renault Clio and Toyota 86.

== Career summary ==
Season	Series	Team	Races	Wins	Poles	FLaps	Podiums	Points	Position
2009	Hong Kong Touring Car Championship	China Dragon Racing	4	0	0	0	0	64	12th
2009	Macau Grand Prix	China Dragon Racing	1	0	0	0	0	N/A	32nd
2010	Hong Kong Touring Car Championship	China Dragon Racing	8	0	0	0	4	212	4th
2010	Macau Grand Prix	China Dragon Racing	1	0	0	0	0	N/A	DNF
2011	Hong Kong Touring Car Championship	China Dragon Racing	8	0	0	0	2	70	5th
2011	Macau Grand Prix	China Dragon Racing	1	0	0	0	0	N/A	6th
2012	Hong Kong Touring Car Championship	China Dragon Racing	2	0	0	0	2	22	5th
2012	Macau Grand Prix	China Dragon Racing	1	0	0	0	0	N/A	11th
2013	Touring Car Series of Asia	China Dragon Racing	4	0	0	0	4	44	2nd
2013	Macau Grand Prix	Teamwork Motorsport	1	0	0	0	0	N/A	7th
2014	Hong Kong Touring Car Championship	Teamwork Motorsport	8	3	0	1	3	78	2nd
2014	Chinese Racing Cup	Hong Kong Automobile Association	4	1	0	0	0	14	6th
2014	Macau Grand Prix	Hong Kong Automobile Association	1	1	0	0	0	N/A	1st
2015	China Touring Car Championship	Teamwork Motorsport	3	0	1	0	0	5	NC
2015	China Touring Car Championship	Changan Ford Racing Team	1	0	0	0	0	0	NC
2016	China Touring Car Championship	Haima Z1 Racing	6	0	0	0	0	33	NC
2016	China GT Championship	Ling Rui 300+	8	1	0	0	6	127	2nd
2016	Super Endurance Championship	Grid Motorsport	3	1	0	0	0	16	3rd
2017	TCR China Touring Car Championship	Teamwork Motorsport	5	0	0	0	0	54	12th
2017	TCR Asia Series	Teamwork Motorsport	4	0	0	0	0	0	NC†
2019	TCR Spa 500	Teamwork Huff Motorsport	1	0	0	0	0	N/A	7th
2022	TCR China Touring Car Championship	Teamwork Motorsport							
2024	Nürburgring Langstrecken-Serie - VT2-R+4WD	Giti Tire Motorsport by WS Racing							
2025	Super Taikyu - ST-Z	Progress Racing							
2026	24H Series - 992	asBest Racing							

=== TCR Spa 500 results ===
Year	Team	Co-Drivers	Car	Class	Laps	Pos.	Class Pos.
2019	(Hong Kong) Teamwork Huff Motorsport	(Hong Kong) Alex Hui (Hong Kong) Paul Poon (Hong Kong) Sunny Wong	Audi RS 3 LMS TCR	PA	428	7th	3rd
