= Eric Kwong =

Hong Kong racing driver

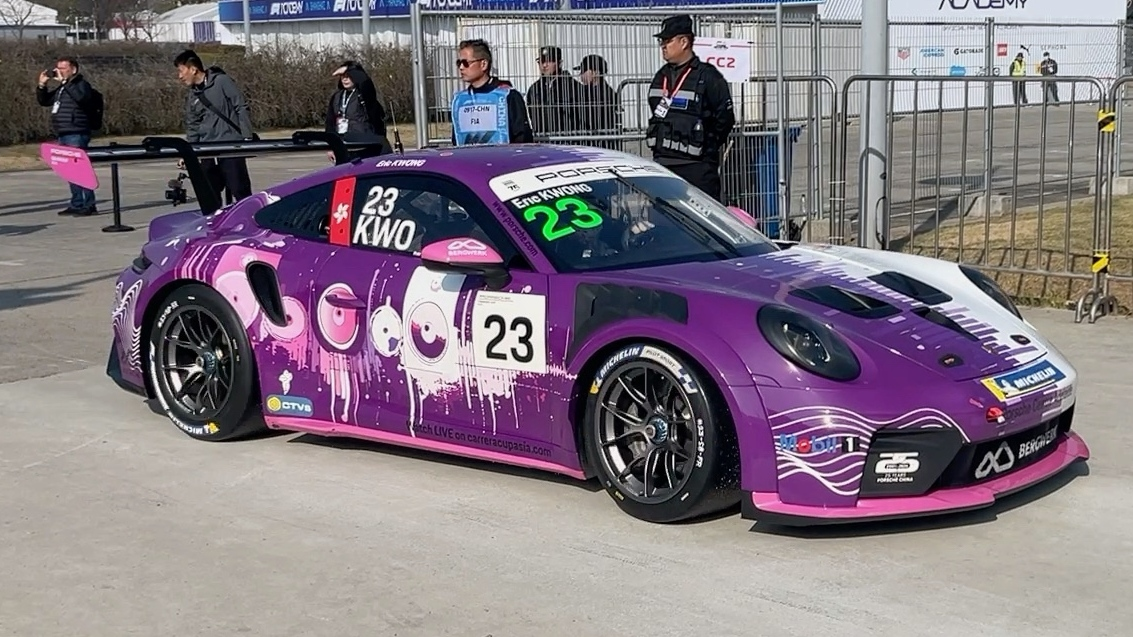
- Kwong driving in the 2026 Porsche Carrera Cup Asia
- Nationality: Hong Kong
- Born: Kwong Hoi-fung; 23 October 1982 (age 44) British Hong Kong

World Touring Car Championship career
- Debut season: 2012
- Current team: Look Fong Racing Team
- Car number: 54
- Starts: 2
- Wins: 0
- Poles: 0
- Fastest laps: 0
- Best finish: NC in 2012

Previous series
- 2012 2011 2009 2009: Audi R8 LMS Cup China; Ferrari Challenge Asia Pacific; Chinese Formula Campus; CTCC

Championship titles
- 2012: HKTCC

Eric Kwong Hoi-fung (born 23 October 1982 in Hong Kong) is an auto racing driver from Hong Kong. He has raced in the Hong Kong Touring Car Championship but is best known for his appearance in the World Touring Car Championship.

== Racing career ==
=== Hong Kong Touring Car Championship ===
Kwong has driven in the Hong Kong Touring Car Championship since 2009. He finished third in 2010, second in 2011 and he won the title in 2012 driving a Super 2000 Honda Accord having won five out of the eight races.

=== World Touring Car Championship ===
Kwong made his debut in the World Touring Car Championship at the 2012 FIA WTCC Race of China, driving a naturally aspirated Chevrolet Cruze LT for Look Fong Racing Team. He qualified in 24th place for the race, fastest of the naturally aspirated cars, and his best result of the weekend was 18th in race one.

== Racing record ==
=== Complete World Touring Car Championship results ===
(key) (Races in bold indicate pole position) (Races in italics indicate fastest lap)

| Year | Team | Car | 1 | 2 | 3 | 4 | 5 | 6 | 7 | 8 | 9 | 10 | 11 | 12 | 13 | 14 | 15 | 16 | 17 | 18 | 19 | 20 | 21 | 22 | 23 | 24 | DC | Points |
|---|---|---|---|---|---|---|---|---|---|---|---|---|---|---|---|---|---|---|---|---|---|---|---|---|---|---|---|---|
| 2012 | Look Fong Racing Team | Chevrolet Cruze LT | ITA; 1 | ITA; 2 | ESP; 1 | ESP; 2 | MAR; 1 | MAR; 2 | SVK; 1 | SVK; 2 | HUN; 1 | HUN; 2 | AUT; 1 | AUT; 2 | POR; 1 | POR; 2 | BRA; 1 | BRA; 2 | USA; 1 | USA; 2 | JPN; 1 | JPN; 2 | CHN; 1; 18 | CHN; 2; 20 | MAC; 1 | MAC; 2 | NC | 0 |

=== TCR Spa 500 results ===
| Year | Team | Co-Drivers | Car | Class | Laps | Pos. | Class Pos. |
|---|---|---|---|---|---|---|---|
| 2019 | (Netherlands) Bas Koeten Racing | (Hong Kong) Alex Au (Hong Kong) Eric Lo (Macau) Kevin Tse | Audi RS 3 LMS TCR | **Am** | 361 | 10th DNF/Crash | **3rd** DNF/Crash |
