= HTCC =

HTCC may refer to:

- Hong Kong Touring Car Championship
- High temperature co-fired ceramic
