= 2017 FRD LMP3 Series =

The 2017 FRD LMP3 Series (Chinese LMP3 Championship) was the inaugural season of the FRD LMP3 Series, the series supported by the ACO attracted some of the best teams in Asia & professional drivers from Europe, Australia and Asia making for a very competitive series. Craft-Bamboo Racing won the teams title after their driver James Winslow won the 2017 driver championship, after victory at Shanghai, Zhuhai, Zhejiang in the Disney-Pixar supported Lightning McQueen Ligier #95 JSP3.

== Calendar ==
Rnd	Circuit	Date	Pole position	Opening Race Winners	Main Race Winners
1	Zhejiang International Circuit, Zhejiang, China	2 July	(Hong Kong) #33. S&D Motorsports	(Philippines) #3. Eurasia Motorsport	(Hong Kong) #95. Craft-Bamboo Racing
1	Zhejiang International Circuit, Zhejiang, China	2 July	(China) Ma Qinghua (China) Leo Ye	(China) Martin Cao (Australia) Garnet Patterson	(United Kingdom) James Winslow (Switzerland) Mathias Beche
2	Shanghai International Circuit, Shanghai, China	30 July	(Hong Kong) #95. Craft-Bamboo Racing	(Hong Kong) #95. Craft-Bamboo Racing	(Hong Kong) #17. PTRS
2	Shanghai International Circuit, Shanghai, China	30 July	(United Kingdom) James Winslow (Switzerland) Mathias Beche	(United Kingdom) James Winslow (Switzerland) Mathias Beche	(New Zealand) Andrew Waite (France) Yann Clairay
3	Shanghai International Circuit, Shanghai, China	27 August	(Hong Kong) #95. Craft-Bamboo Racing	(Hong Kong) #95. Craft-Bamboo Racing	(Hong Kong) #17. PTRS
3	Shanghai International Circuit, Shanghai, China	27 August	(United Kingdom) James Winslow (Switzerland) Mathias Beche	(United Kingdom) James Winslow (Switzerland) Mathias Beche	(New Zealand) Andrew Waite (France) Yann Clairay
4	Zhuhai International Circuit, Zhuhai, China	17 September	(Hong Kong) #88. FS Sport Racing	(Hong Kong) #95. Craft-Bamboo Racing	(Hong Kong) #18. KCMG
4	Zhuhai International Circuit, Zhuhai, China	17 September	(Hong Kong) Andy Yan (Colombia) Julio Acosta	(United Kingdom) James Winslow (Japan) Hiroki Yoshida	(Australia) Josh Burdon (China) Neric Wei

== Entry list ==
=== LMP3 ===
Entrant/Team	Car	Engine	No.	Drivers	Rounds
(Hong Kong) FS Sport Racing	Ligier JS P3	Nissan VK50VE 5.0 L V8	1	(Hong Kong) Andy Yan	1-3
(Hong Kong) FS Sport Racing	Ligier JS P3	Nissan VK50VE 5.0 L V8	1	(France) Olivier Lombard	All
(Hong Kong) FS Sport Racing	Ligier JS P3	Nissan VK50VE 5.0 L V8	1	(Italy) Marco Jacoboni	4
(Hong Kong) FS Sport Racing	Ligier JS P3	Nissan VK50VE 5.0 L V8	88	(Hong Kong) Kenneth Ma	3
(Hong Kong) FS Sport Racing	Ligier JS P3	Nissan VK50VE 5.0 L V8	88	(Hong Kong) Aaron Kwok	3
(Hong Kong) FS Sport Racing	Ligier JS P3	Nissan VK50VE 5.0 L V8	88	(Hong Kong) Andy Yan	4
(Hong Kong) FS Sport Racing	Ligier JS P3	Nissan VK50VE 5.0 L V8	88	(Colombia) Julio Acosta	4
(Philippines) Eurasia Motorsport	Ligier JS P3	Nissan VK50VE 5.0 L V8	3	(China) Martin Cao	All
(Philippines) Eurasia Motorsport	Ligier JS P3	Nissan VK50VE 5.0 L V8	3	(Australia) Garnet Patterson	All
(Philippines) Eurasia Motorsport	Ligier JS P3	Nissan VK50VE 5.0 L V8	91	(Colombia) Julio Acosta	1-2
(Philippines) Eurasia Motorsport	Ligier JS P3	Nissan VK50VE 5.0 L V8	91	(Hong Kong) Alex Au	3-4
(Philippines) Eurasia Motorsport	Ligier JS P3	Nissan VK50VE 5.0 L V8	91	(United Kingdom) Dan Wells	All
(Hong Kong) PTRS	Ligier JS P3	Nissan VK50VE 5.0 L V8	7	(New Zealand) Simon Evans	All
(Hong Kong) PTRS	Ligier JS P3	Nissan VK50VE 5.0 L V8	7	(China) Rainey He	All
(Hong Kong) PTRS	Ligier JS P3	Nissan VK50VE 5.0 L V8	17	(New Zealand) Andrew Waite	All
(Hong Kong) PTRS	Ligier JS P3	Nissan VK50VE 5.0 L V8	17	(France) Yann Clairay	All
(Hong Kong) KCMG	Ligier JS P3	Nissan VK50VE 5.0 L V8	18	(China) Neric Wei	1-2, 4
(Hong Kong) KCMG	Ligier JS P3	Nissan VK50VE 5.0 L V8	18	(China) Junjin Pu	3
(Hong Kong) KCMG	Ligier JS P3	Nissan VK50VE 5.0 L V8	18	(Australia) Josh Burdon	All
(Hong Kong) KCMG	Ligier JS P3	Nissan VK50VE 5.0 L V8	19	(Japan) Motoyoshi Yoshida	3
(Hong Kong) KCMG	Ligier JS P3	Nissan VK50VE 5.0 L V8	19	(Japan) Ryuji Kumita	3
(Hong Kong) KCMG	Ligier JS P3	Nissan VK50VE 5.0 L V8	19	(Netherlands) Ate de Jong	4
(Hong Kong) KCMG	Ligier JS P3	Nissan VK50VE 5.0 L V8	19	(Japan) Masayuki Ueda	4
(Hong Kong) Craft-Bamboo Racing	Ligier JS P3	Nissan VK50VE 5.0 L V8	20	(Australia) Greg Taylor	1-2, 4
(Hong Kong) Craft-Bamboo Racing	Ligier JS P3	Nissan VK50VE 5.0 L V8	20	(Canada) Alex Tagliani	1, 3-4
(Hong Kong) Craft-Bamboo Racing	Ligier JS P3	Nissan VK50VE 5.0 L V8	20	(Italy) Marco Bonanomi	2
(Hong Kong) Craft-Bamboo Racing	Ligier JS P3	Nissan VK50VE 5.0 L V8	20	(Australia) Dean Koutsoumidis	3
(Hong Kong) Craft-Bamboo Racing	Ligier JS P3	Nissan VK50VE 5.0 L V8	95	(Switzerland) Mathias Beche	1-3
(Hong Kong) Craft-Bamboo Racing	Ligier JS P3	Nissan VK50VE 5.0 L V8	95	(United Kingdom) James Winslow	All
(Hong Kong) Craft-Bamboo Racing	Ligier JS P3	Nissan VK50VE 5.0 L V8	95	(Japan) Hiroki Yoshida	4
(China) S&D Motorsports	Ligier JS P3	Nissan VK50VE 5.0 L V8	25	(Australia) Tim Macrow	1-3
(China) S&D Motorsports	Ligier JS P3	Nissan VK50VE 5.0 L V8	25	(Singapore) Denis Lian	1
(China) S&D Motorsports	Ligier JS P3	Nissan VK50VE 5.0 L V8	25	(Macau) Kevin Tse	2
(China) S&D Motorsports	Ligier JS P3	Nissan VK50VE 5.0 L V8	25	(New Zealand) Andre Heimgartner	3
(China) S&D Motorsports	Ligier JS P3	Nissan VK50VE 5.0 L V8	33	(China) Ma Qinghua	All
(China) S&D Motorsports	Ligier JS P3	Nissan VK50VE 5.0 L V8	33	(China) Leo Ye	1, 3
(China) S&D Motorsports	Ligier JS P3	Nissan VK50VE 5.0 L V8	33	(France) Nathan Bihel	2
(China) S&D Motorsports	Ligier JS P3	Nissan VK50VE 5.0 L V8	33	(Australia) Tim Macrow	4
(China) Jackie Chan DC Racing Team	Ligier JS P3	Nissan VK50VE 5.0 L V8	38	(Angola) Ricardo Teixeira	1
(China) Jackie Chan DC Racing Team	Ligier JS P3	Nissan VK50VE 5.0 L V8	38	(Hong Kong) Edgar Lau	1
(Japan) B-Max Racing Team	Ligier JS P3	Nissan VK50VE 5.0 L V8	50	(Japan) Ryuji Kumita	4
(Japan) B-Max Racing Team	Ligier JS P3	Nissan VK50VE 5.0 L V8	50	(Japan) Daiki Sasaki	4
