= Martin Cao =

Chinese racing driver

Cao Hongwei
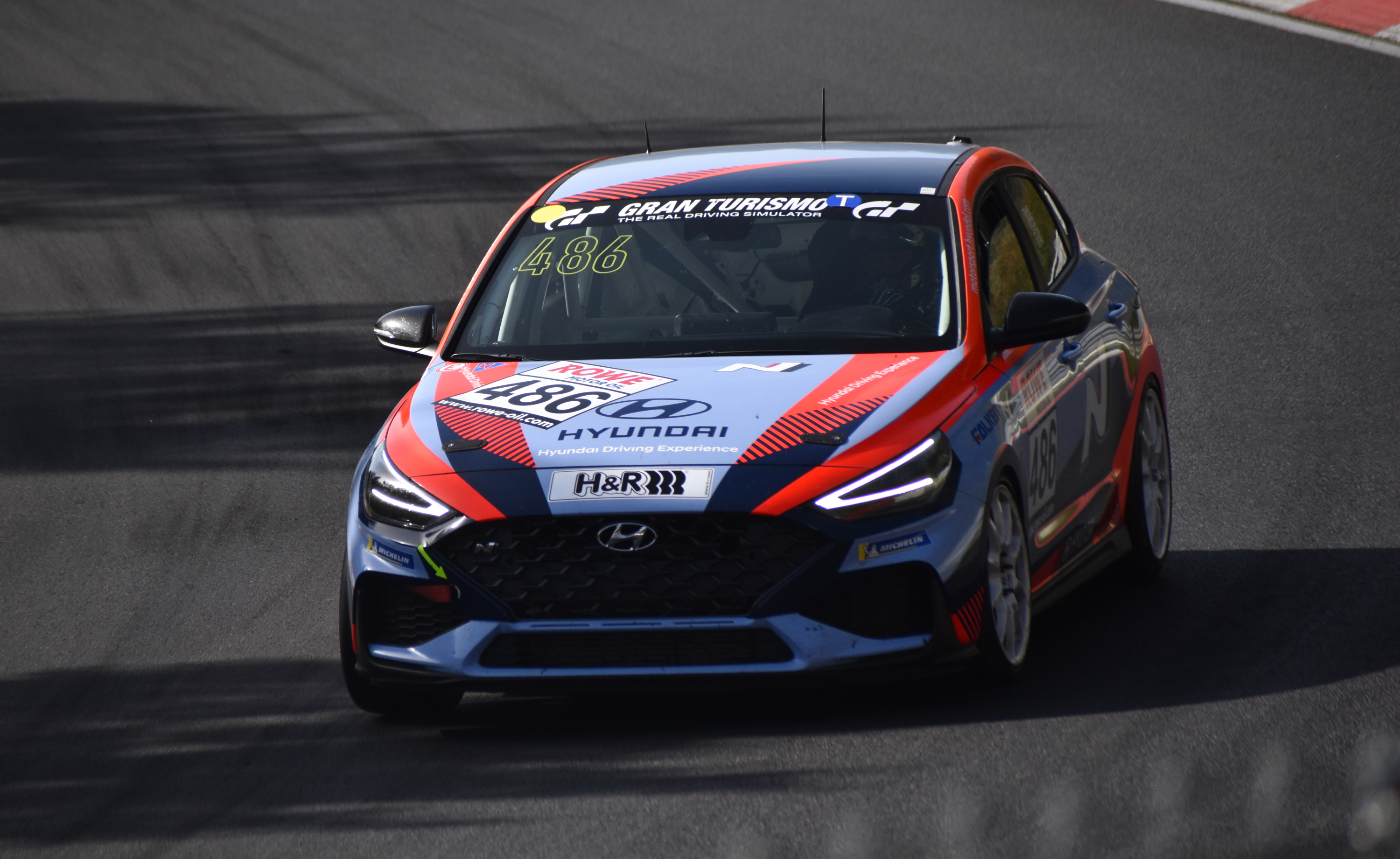
- Cao driving a Hyundai i30 at the 2023 Nürburgring Endurance Series
- Nationality: (China) Chinese
- Born: 17 February 1993 (age 33) Changsha, Hunan, China

British Formula 3 Championship career
- Debut season: 2014
- Current team: Fortec Motorsports
- Car number: 57
- Starts: 21
- Wins: 4
- Podiums: 11
- Poles: 9
- Fastest laps: 4
- Best finish: 1st in 2014

Previous series
- 2012–13 2012–13 2008, 10–11 2008–09 2008: Protyre FR Autumn Cup; Protyre Formula Renault; Asian Formula Renault Challenge; Formula BMW Pacific; FF Campus China

Championship titles
- 2023, 2024 2014 2008: TCR China Touring Car Championship; British Formula 3 FF Campus China

Cao Hongwei (Chinese: 曹宏炜; pinyin: Cáo Hóngwěi, born 17 February 1993), commonly known as Martin Cao, is a Chinese racing driver. He is a two-time champion of the TCR China Touring Car Championship, having won the title back-to-back in 2023 and 2024, and previously won the 2014 British Formula Three Championship.

== Career ==
=== Asian championships ===
Born in Changsha, Hunan Province, Cao began karting in 1999 at the age of six, and would compete in the China National Karting Championship for the first time in 2003. In 2009, at the age of sixteen, Cao, alongside Zhu Daiwei, would become the first Chinese driver in history to compete in the FIA World Karting Championship.

Cao stepped up to single-seater racing in 2008, competing in the Chinese Formula Ford Campus Championship. He won five races and clinched the championship with an advantage of seven points. Also in 2008, Cao finished third with seven podiums in the Asian Formula Renault Challenge and also contested two races of the Formula BMW Pacific Championship, with Pacific Racing.

In 2009, Cao remained in Formula BMW Pacific but switched to Ao's Racing. He had six point-scoring finishes in nine races, finishing twelfth in the championship.

In 2010, Cao returned to the Asian Formula Renault Challenge with the FRD Racing Team. He won five out of the six races he contested – one more than champion Sandy Stuvik – and finished fourth in the championship.

=== Protyre Formula Renault ===
In 2012, Cao moved to Europe and joined Fortec Motorsports to compete in Formula Renault BARC. He finished nine races in the points to take fourteenth position in the championship, with 100 points. He also finished fifth in the 2012 Formula Renault BARC Winter Series.

Cao remained with Fortec into 2013, staying in the newly renamed Protyre Formula Renault Championship. He won a race at Rockingham and finished fourth in the final championship standings. He finished runner-up to Ben Barnicoat in the Protyre Formula Renault Autumn Cup at Rockingham, winning one of the event's three races.

=== British Formula 3 Championship ===
Cao continued his collaboration with Fortec into the British Formula 3 Championship in 2014. He finished fifteen races on the podium, including four wins. He battled with his teammate Matt Rao for the title, and clinched the championship by just two points, ahead of Rao.

== Racing record ==
=== Career summary ===
Season	Series	Team	Races	Wins	Poles	F/Laps	Podiums	Points	Position
2008	Ford Formula Campus Championship - China Category	Baleno Team	8	5	2	4	6	58	**1st**
2008	Asian Formula Renault Challenge	Pekka Saarinen Racing	13	0	0	0	7	231	**3rd**
2008	Formula BMW Pacific	Pacific Racing	2	0	0	0	0	N/A	NC†
2009	Formula BMW Pacific	Ao's Racing Team	9	0	0	0	0	19	12th
2009	China Touring Car Championship	Changan Ford	1	1	0	0	1	10	10th
2010	Asian Formula Renault Challenge	FRD Racing Team	6	5	1	3	6	155	4th
2011	Asian Formula Renault Challenge	FRD Racing Team	2	0	1	0	1	24	20th
2012	Formula Renault BARC	Fortec Motorsports	13	0	0	0	0	100	14th
2012	Formula Renault BARC Winter Series	Fortec Motorsports	4	0	0	0	1	79	5th
2013	Protyre Formula Renault Championship	Fortec Motorsports	16	1	1	0	5	296	4th
2013	Protyre Formula Renault Autumn Cup	Fortec Motorsports	3	1	0	0	2	79	**2nd**
2014	British Formula 3 Championship	Fortec Motorsports	21	4	9	4	11	285	**1st**
2014	FIA Formula 3 European Championship	Fortec Motorsports	3	0	0	0	0	0	NC†
2014	Zandvoort Masters	Fortec Motorsports	1	0	0	0	0	N/A	6th
2014	Macau Grand Prix	Fortec Motorsports	2	0	0	0	0	N/A	DNF
2015	FIA Formula 3 European Championship	Fortec Motorsports	15	0	0	0	0	0	30th
2015	Macau Grand Prix	Fortec Motorsports	1	0	0	0	0	N/A	17th
2016	China Touring Car Championship - Super Production 2.0	Changan Ford Racing Team	16	1	0	0	4	116	4th
2016	TCR International Series	FRD Motorsports	2	0	0	0	0	0	NC
2017	China Touring Car Championship	Changan Ford Racing Team	16	1	0	1	3	121.5	**3rd**
2017	FRD LMP3 Series	Eurasia Motorsport	8	1	0	0	4	77	6th
2018	China Touring Car Championship	Changan Ford Racing Team	16	1	0	0	6	121.5	**2nd**
2019	China Touring Car Championship	Dongfeng Yueda Kia Racing Team	16	2	?	?	3	151	**2nd**
2020	China Touring Car Championship	Dongfeng Yueda Kia Racing Team	16	2	?	?	?	174	4th
2021	China Touring Car Championship	Team MG XPower	12	?	?	?	?	156	4th
2021	TCR Asia Series	Team MG XPower							
2021	TCR China Touring Car Championship	Team MG XPower	11	3	0	1	6	146	**2nd**
2022	China Touring Car Championship	Team MG XPower	12	?	?	?	?	127	4th
2022	TCR Asia Series	Team MG XPower	10	0	0	0	2	60	7th
2023	TCR China Touring Car Championship	Hyundai N Team	12	4	0	1	6	178	**1st**
2024	Nürburgring Langstrecken-Serie - VT2-FWD	Hyundai Driving Experience							
2024	Nürburgring Langstrecken-Serie - TCR	Hyundai Motorsport N							
2024	24 Hours of Nürburgring - TCR	Hyundai Motorsport N	1						
2024	TCR World Tour	Hyundai N Team	4	0	0	0	0	25	14th

^{†} As Cao was a guest driver, he was ineligible for points. ^{*} Season still in progress.

=== Complete FIA Formula 3 European Championship results ===
(key)

Year	Entrant	Engine	1	2	3	4	5	6	7	8	9	10	11	12	13	14	15	16	17	18	19	20	21	22	23	24	25	26	27	28	29	30	31	32	33	DC	Points
2015	Fortec Motorsports	Mercedes	SIL; 1; 23	SIL; 2; 17	SIL; 3; 23	HOC; 1; 18	HOC; 2; 18	HOC; 3; 21	PAU; 1; 21	PAU; 2; 16	PAU; 3; 24	MNZ; 1; 14	MNZ; 2; 17	MNZ; 3; 15	SPA; 1; 20	SPA; 2; 20	SPA; 3; 17	NOR; 1	NOR; 2	NOR; 3	ZAN; 1	ZAN; 2	ZAN; 3	RBR; 1	RBR; 2	RBR; 3	ALG; 1	ALG; 2	ALG; 3	NÜR; 1	NÜR; 2	NÜR; 3	HOC; 1	HOC; 2	HOC; 3	30th	0

=== Complete TCR International Series results ===
(key) (Races in bold indicate pole position) (Races in italics indicate fastest lap)

Year	Team	Car	1	2	3	4	5	6	7	8	9	10	11	12	13	14	15	16	17	18	19	20	21	22	DC	Points
2016	FRD Motorsports	Ford Focus TCR	BHR; 1	BHR; 2	EST; 1	EST; 2	SPA; 1	SPA; 2	IMO; 1	IMO; 2	SAL; 1	SAL; 2	OSC; 1	OSC; 2	SOC; 1	SOC; 2	CHA; 1; 13	CHA; 2; 12	MRN; 1	MRN; 2	SEP; 1	SEP; 2	MAC; 1	MAC; 2	NC	0

=== Complete TCR World Tour results ===
(key) (Races in bold indicate pole position) (Races in italics indicate fastest lap)

Year	Team	Car	1	2	3	4	5	6	7	8	9	10	11	12	13	14	DC	Points
2024	Hyundai N Team	Hyundai Elantra N TCR	VAL; 1	VAL; 2	MRK; 1	MRK; 2	MOH; 1	MOH; 2	SAP; 1	SAP; 2	ELP; 1	ELP; 2	ZHZ; 1; 12	ZHZ; 2; 13	MAC; 1; 8	MAC; 2; 11	14th	25

Sporting positions
Preceded by Jordan King	British Formula Three Champion; 2014	Succeeded by Series ended
