= 2019 TCR Spa 500 =

Race details

Date	3–6 October 2019
Official name	TCR Spa 500
Location	Circuit de Spa-Francorchamps, Stavelot, Belgium
Course	Modern circuit with new pit lane and Bus Stop Chicane (2007–present); 7.004 km (4.352 mi)
Distance	Main Race; 500 laps / 3,502.00 km (2,176.04 mi) OR; 23 hours
- Qualifying

Pole
Drivers	(Netherlands) Gjis Bessem (Netherlands) Christiaan Frankenhout (Netherlands) Harry Hilders (Netherlands) Jaap van Lagen	NKPP Racing by Bas Koeten Racing

2nd
Drivers	(Spain) Pepe Oriola (Netherlands) Tom Coronel (Netherlands) Rik Breukers (Netherlands) Ivo Breukers	Red Camel-Jordans.nl

3rd
Drivers	(Australia) Darryl Clarke (Australia) Clint Harvey (Australia) Brett Niall (Australia) Malcolm Niall (Finland) Rory Penttinen	GDL Racing Team Australia
- Spa 500

Fastest lap
Drivers	(France) Aurélien Comte (France) Teddy Clairet (France) Julien Briché	DG Sport Compétition
Time	2:34.616

Podium
First	(Spain) Pepe Oriola (Netherlands) Tom Coronel (Netherlands) Rik Breukers (Netherlands) Ivo Breukers	Red Camel-Jordans.nl
Second	(France) Aurélien Comte (France) Teddy Clairet (France) Julien Briché	DG Sport Compétition
Third	(Spain) Mikel Azcona (Switzerland) Julien Apotheloz (Switzerland) Fabian Danz (Finland) Antti Buri (Finland) Kari-Pekka Laaksonen	TOPCAR Sport with Bas Koeten Racing

The 2019 TCR Spa 500 was the first and only edition of the TCR Spa 500 endurance touring car race. It was promoted by the WSC, the group behind the TCR concept, and Creventic, who promotes the 24H Series.

The race was scheduled for 500 laps of the 7,004 metres (4.352 mi) circuit, for a total of 3,502 kilometres (2,176 mi), with a time-certain finish of 23 hours from the green flag of the race.

The race was won by Red Camel-Jordans.nl with Pepe Oriola, Tom Coronel, Rik Breukers and Ivo Breukers, which completed 454 laps. In second place came DG Sport Compétition with Aurélien Comte, Julien Briché and Teddy Clairet, with third place going to the TOPCAR Sport with Bas Koeten Racing team of Mikel Azcona, Julien Apotheloz, Fabian Danz, Antti Buri and Kari-Pekka Laaksonen.

== Teams and drivers ==
Team	Car	No.	Drivers	Class
(Denmark) Holmgaard Motorsport	Volkswagen Golf GTI TCR	2	(Canada) Jérimy Daniel	Am
(Denmark) Holmgaard Motorsport	Volkswagen Golf GTI TCR	2	(Norway) Roy Edland	Am
(Denmark) Holmgaard Motorsport	Volkswagen Golf GTI TCR	2	(Denmark) Jonas Holmgaard	Am
(Denmark) Holmgaard Motorsport	Volkswagen Golf GTI TCR	2	(Denmark) Magnus Holmgaard	Am
(Denmark) Holmgaard Motorsport	Volkswagen Golf GTI TCR	2	(New Zealand) Rowan Shepherd	Am
(Belgium) AC Motorsport	Audi RS 3 LMS TCR	8	(Belgium) Mathieu Detry	PA
(Belgium) AC Motorsport	Audi RS 3 LMS TCR	8	(Belgium) Vincent Radermecker	PA
(Belgium) AC Motorsport	Audi RS 3 LMS TCR	8	(United Kingdom) Stewart Lines	PA
(Belgium) AC Motorsport	Audi RS 3 LMS TCR	8	(France) Stéphane Perrin	PA
GDL Racing Team Australia	Audi RS 3 LMS TCR	9	(Australia) Darryl Clarke	Am
GDL Racing Team Australia	Audi RS 3 LMS TCR	9	(Australia) Clint Harvey	Am
GDL Racing Team Australia	Audi RS 3 LMS TCR	9	(Australia) Brett Niall	Am
GDL Racing Team Australia	Audi RS 3 LMS TCR	9	(Australia) Malcolm Niall	Am
GDL Racing Team Australia	Audi RS 3 LMS TCR	9	(Finland) Rory Penttinen	Am
(Hong Kong) Teamwork Huff Motorsport	Audi RS 3 LMS TCR	22	(China) Yan Chuang	PA
(Hong Kong) Teamwork Huff Motorsport	Audi RS 3 LMS TCR	22	(China) Rainey He	PA
(Hong Kong) Teamwork Huff Motorsport	Audi RS 3 LMS TCR	22	(China) Neric Wei	PA
(Hong Kong) Teamwork Huff Motorsport	Audi RS 3 LMS TCR	22	(Hong Kong) Andy Yan	PA
(Hong Kong) Teamwork Huff Motorsport	Audi RS 3 LMS TCR	852	(Hong Kong) Alex Hui	PA
(Hong Kong) Teamwork Huff Motorsport	Audi RS 3 LMS TCR	852	(Hong Kong) Samuel Hsieh	PA
(Hong Kong) Teamwork Huff Motorsport	Audi RS 3 LMS TCR	852	(Hong Kong) Paul Poon	PA
(Hong Kong) Teamwork Huff Motorsport	Audi RS 3 LMS TCR	852	(Hong Kong) Sunny Wong	PA
(Austria) Wimmer Werk Motorsport	CUPRA León TCR	33	(Austria) Günter Benninger	PA
(Austria) Wimmer Werk Motorsport	CUPRA León TCR	33	(Austria) Peter Gross	PA
(Austria) Wimmer Werk Motorsport	CUPRA León TCR	33	(Austria) Hans Peter Eder	PA
(Austria) Wimmer Werk Motorsport	CUPRA León TCR	33	(Austria) Christian Voithofer	PA
(Austria) Wimmer Werk Motorsport	CUPRA León TCR	33	(Austria) Constantin Schöll	PA
(Belgium) Burton Racing	Peugeot 308 TCR	46	(Belgium) Caren Burton	Am
(Belgium) Burton Racing	Peugeot 308 TCR	46	(Belgium) Pierre-Yves Corthals	Am
(Belgium) Burton Racing	Peugeot 308 TCR	46	(Belgium) Armand Fumal	Am
(Belgium) Burton Racing	Peugeot 308 TCR	46	(Belgium) Olivier Meurens	Am
(Belgium) Burton Racing	Peugeot 308 TCR	46	(Belgium) Philippe Steveny	Am
(Belgium) Ferda Autosport By QSR Racing	Audi RS 3 LMS TCR	54	(United States) Chris Allen	Am
(Belgium) Ferda Autosport By QSR Racing	Audi RS 3 LMS TCR	54	(United States) Lance Bergstein	Am
(Belgium) Ferda Autosport By QSR Racing	Audi RS 3 LMS TCR	54	(United States) Ramana Lagemann	Am
(Belgium) Ferda Autosport By QSR Racing	Audi RS 3 LMS TCR	54	(United States) Jon Miller	Am
(Malaysia) Viper Niza Racing	CUPRA León TCR	65	(Malaysia) Dominc Ang	PA
(Malaysia) Viper Niza Racing	CUPRA León TCR	65	(Malaysia) Fariqe Hairuman	PA
(Malaysia) Viper Niza Racing	CUPRA León TCR	65	(Malaysia) Douglas Khoo	PA
(Malaysia) Viper Niza Racing	CUPRA León TCR	65	(Malaysia) Melvin Moh	PA
(Germany) Vmax-Engineering	Opel Astra TCR	85	(Canada) Steven Cho	PA
(Germany) Vmax-Engineering	Opel Astra TCR	85	(United States) Charles Espenlaub	PA
(Germany) Vmax-Engineering	Opel Astra TCR	85	(United States) Charles Putman	PA
(Germany) Vmax-Engineering	Opel Astra TCR	85	(Belgium) Ward Sluys	PA
(Netherlands) Red Camel-Jordans.nl	CUPRA León TCR	101	(Netherlands) Ivo Breukers	P
(Netherlands) Red Camel-Jordans.nl	CUPRA León TCR	101	(Netherlands) Rik Breukers	P
(Netherlands) Red Camel-Jordans.nl	CUPRA León TCR	101	(Netherlands) Tom Coronel	P
(Netherlands) Red Camel-Jordans.nl	CUPRA León TCR	101	(Spain) Pepe Oriola	P
(France) Motorsport developpement	Audi RS 3 LMS TCR	102	(France) Pierre-Étienne Chaumat	Am
(France) Motorsport developpement	Audi RS 3 LMS TCR	102	(Belgium) Hervé Maillien	Am
(France) Motorsport developpement	Audi RS 3 LMS TCR	102	(Belgium) Sebastien Tyhon	Am
(France) Motorsport developpement	Audi RS 3 LMS TCR	102	(France) Philippe Ulivieri	Am
(Sweden) Lestrup Racing Team	Volkswagen Golf GTI TCR	110	(Sweden) Peter Fahlström	Am
(Sweden) Lestrup Racing Team	Volkswagen Golf GTI TCR	110	(Sweden) Marcus Fluch	Am
(Sweden) Lestrup Racing Team	Volkswagen Golf GTI TCR	110	(Sweden) Stefan Nilsson	Am
(Sweden) Lestrup Racing Team	Volkswagen Golf GTI TCR	110	(Sweden) Mats Olsson	Am
(Netherlands) Bas Koeten Racing (Note: Car No. 125 entered as Bas Koeten Racing, car No. 131 entered as TOPCAR Sport by Bas Koeten Racing and car No. 175 entered as NKPP Racing by Bas Koeten Racing.) (Switzerland) TOPCAR sport with Bas Koeten Racing (Netherlands) NKPP Racing by Bas Koeten Racing	Audi RS 3 LMS TCR	125	(Hong Kong) Alex Au	Am
(Netherlands) Bas Koeten Racing (Switzerland) TOPCAR sport with Bas Koeten Racing (Netherlands) NKPP Racing by Bas Koeten Racing	Audi RS 3 LMS TCR	125	(Hong Kong) Eric Kwong	Am
(Netherlands) Bas Koeten Racing (Switzerland) TOPCAR sport with Bas Koeten Racing (Netherlands) NKPP Racing by Bas Koeten Racing	Audi RS 3 LMS TCR	125	(Hong Kong) Eric Lo	Am
(Netherlands) Bas Koeten Racing (Switzerland) TOPCAR sport with Bas Koeten Racing (Netherlands) NKPP Racing by Bas Koeten Racing	Audi RS 3 LMS TCR	125	(Macau) Kevin Tse	Am
(Netherlands) Bas Koeten Racing (Switzerland) TOPCAR sport with Bas Koeten Racing (Netherlands) NKPP Racing by Bas Koeten Racing	CUPRA León TCR	131	(Spain) Mikel Azcona	P
(Netherlands) Bas Koeten Racing (Switzerland) TOPCAR sport with Bas Koeten Racing (Netherlands) NKPP Racing by Bas Koeten Racing	CUPRA León TCR	131	(Switzerland) Julien Apotheloz	P
(Netherlands) Bas Koeten Racing (Switzerland) TOPCAR sport with Bas Koeten Racing (Netherlands) NKPP Racing by Bas Koeten Racing	CUPRA León TCR	131	(Switzerland) Fabian Danz	P
(Netherlands) Bas Koeten Racing (Switzerland) TOPCAR sport with Bas Koeten Racing (Netherlands) NKPP Racing by Bas Koeten Racing	CUPRA León TCR	131	(Finland) Antti Buri	P
(Netherlands) Bas Koeten Racing (Switzerland) TOPCAR sport with Bas Koeten Racing (Netherlands) NKPP Racing by Bas Koeten Racing	CUPRA León TCR	131	(Finland) Kari-Pekka Laaksonen	P
(Netherlands) Bas Koeten Racing (Switzerland) TOPCAR sport with Bas Koeten Racing (Netherlands) NKPP Racing by Bas Koeten Racing	CUPRA León TCR	175	(Netherlands) Gijs Bessem	PA
(Netherlands) Bas Koeten Racing (Switzerland) TOPCAR sport with Bas Koeten Racing (Netherlands) NKPP Racing by Bas Koeten Racing	CUPRA León TCR	175	(Netherlands) Christiaan Frankenhout	PA
(Netherlands) Bas Koeten Racing (Switzerland) TOPCAR sport with Bas Koeten Racing (Netherlands) NKPP Racing by Bas Koeten Racing	CUPRA León TCR	175	(Netherlands) Harry Hilders	PA
(Netherlands) Bas Koeten Racing (Switzerland) TOPCAR sport with Bas Koeten Racing (Netherlands) NKPP Racing by Bas Koeten Racing	CUPRA León TCR	175	(Netherlands) Jaap van Lagen	PA
(Belgium) DG Sport Compétition	Peugeot 308 TCR	308	(France) Julien Briché[	P
(Belgium) DG Sport Compétition	Peugeot 308 TCR	308	(France) Teddy Clairet	P
(Belgium) DG Sport Compétition	Peugeot 308 TCR	308	(France) Aurélien Comte	P
Macau PS Racing	Audi RS 3 LMS TCR	853	(Macau) Filipe de Souza	Am
Macau PS Racing	Audi RS 3 LMS TCR	853	(Macau) Louis Ng	Am
Macau PS Racing	Audi RS 3 LMS TCR	853	(Macau) Kelvin Wong	Am
Macau PS Racing	Audi RS 3 LMS TCR	853	(Macau) Ryan Wong	Am
Macau PS Racing	Audi RS 3 LMS TCR	853	(Macau) Lam Kam San	Am

Icon	Class
P	Pro Cup
PA	Pro-Am Cup
Am	Am Cup

== Results ==
=== Qualifying ===
Class pole positions in bold.

Pos	Class	No.	Team	Drivers	Car	Time	Laps
1	PA	**175**	(Netherlands) **NKPP Racing by Bas Koeten Racing**	(Netherlands) **Gijs Bessem** **(Netherlands) Christiaan Frankenhout** **(Netherlands) Harry Hilders** **(Netherlands) Jaap van Lagen**	**CUPRA León TCR**	**2:37.916**	**10**
2	P	**101**	(Netherlands) **Red Camel-Jordans.nl**	(Netherlands) **Ivo Breukers** **(Netherlands) Rik Breukers** **(Netherlands) Tom Coronel** **(Spain) Pepe Oriola**	**CUPRA León TCR**	**2:39.038**	**7**
3	Am	**9**	**GDL Racing Team Australia**	(Australia) **Darryl Clarke** **(Australia) Clint Harvey** **(Australia) Brett Niall** **(Australia) Malcolm Niall** **(Finland) Rory Penttinen**	**Audi RS 3 LMS TCR**	**2:39.664**	**10**
4	PA	85	(Germany) Vmax Engineering	(Canada) Steven Cho (United States) Charles Espenlaub (United States) Charles Putman (Belgium) Ward Sluys	Opel Astra TCR	2:39.761	9
5	PA	8	(Belgium) AC Motorsport	(Belgium) Mathieu Detry (Belgium) Vincent Radermecker (United Kingdom) Stewart Lines (France) Stéphane Perrin	Audi RS 3 LMS TCR	2:40.271	9
6	PA	33	(Austria) Wimmer Werk Motorsport	(Austria) Günter Benninger (Austria) Peter Gross (Austria) Hans Peter Eder (Austria) Christian Voithofer (Austria) Günther Wiesmeier	CUPRA León TCR	2:40.308	11
7	P	131	(Switzerland) TOPCAR Sport with Bas Koeten Racing	(Spain) Mikel Azcona (Switzerland) Julien Apotheloz (Switzerland) Fabian Danz (Finland) Antti Buri (Finland) Kari-Pekka Laaksonen	CUPRA León TCR	2:40.737	9
8	P	308	(Belgium) DG Sport Compétition	(France) Julien Briché (France) Teddy Clairet (France) Aurélien Comte	Peugeot 308 TCR	2:40.812	8
9	Am	110	(Sweden) Lestrup Racing Team	(Sweden) Peter Fahlström (Sweden) Marcus Fluch (Sweden) Stefan Nilsson (Sweden) Mats Olsson	Volkswagen Golf GTI TCR	2:40.822	11
10	Am	46	(Belgium) Burton Racing	(Belgium) Caren Burton (Belgium) Pierre-Yves Corthals (Belgium) Armand Fumal (Belgium) Oliver Meurens (Belgium) Philippe Steveny	Peugeot 308 TCR	2:41.110	9
11	Am	2	(Denmark) Holmgaard Motorsport	(Canada) Jérimy Daniel (Norway) Roy Edland (Denmark) Jonas Holmgaard (Denmark) Magnus Holmgaard (New Zealand) Rowan Shepherd	Volkswagen Golf GTI TCR	2:41.444	8
12	Am	853	Macau PS Racing	(Macau) Filipe de Souza (Macau) Louis Ng (Macau) Kelvin Wong (Macau) Ryan Wong (Macau) Lam Kam San	Audi RS 3 LMS TCR	2:43.547	9
13	Am	54	(Belgium) Ferda Autosport by QSR Racing	(United States) Chris Allen (United States) Lance Bergstein (United States) Ramana Lagemann (United States) Jon Miller	Audi RS 3 LMS TCR	2:43.973	9
14	PA	22	(Hong Kong) Teamwork Huff Motorsport	(China) Yan Chuang (China) Rainey He (China) Neric Wei (Hong Kong) Andy Yan	Audi RS 3 LMS TCR	2:45.727	9
15	PA	852	(Hong Kong) Teamwork Huff Motorsport	(Hong Kong) Alex Hui (Hong Kong) Samuel Hsieh (Hong Kong) Paul Poon (Hong Kong) Sunny Wong	Audi RS 3 LMS TCR	2:50.668	5
16	PA	65	(Malaysia) Viper Niza Racing	(Malaysia) Dominic Ang (Malaysia) Fariqe Hairuman (Malaysia) Douglas Khoo (Malaysia) Melvin Moh	CUPRA León TCR	2:50.753	9
17	Am	125	(Netherlands) Bas Koeten Racing	(Hong Kong) Alex Au (Hong Kong) Eric Kwong (Hong Kong) Eric Lo (Macau) Kevin Tse	Audi RS 3 LMS TCR	2:52.932	9

=== Race ===
The minimum number of laps for classification (60% of the overall winning car's race distance) was 273 laps. Class winners in bold.

Pos	Class	No.	Team	Drivers	Car	Time/Reason	Laps
1	P	**101**	(Netherlands) **Red Camel-Jordans.nl**	(Netherlands) **Ivo Breukers** **(Netherlands) Rik Breukers** **(Netherlands) Tom Coronel** **(Spain) Pepe Oriola**	**CUPRA León TCR**	**23:02:11.018**	**454**
2	P	308	(Belgium) DG Sport Compétition	(France) Julien Briché (France) Teddy Clairet (France) Aurélien Comte	Peugeot 308 TCR	+5 Laps	449
3	P	131	(Switzerland) TOPCAR Sport with Bas Koeten Racing	(Spain) Mikel Azcona (Switzerland) Julien Apotheloz (Switzerland) Fabian Danz (Finland) Antti Buri (Finland) Kari-Pekka Laaksonen	CUPRA León TCR	+10 Laps	444
4	PA	**65**	(Malaysia) **Viper Niza Racing**	(Malaysia) **Dominic Ang** **(Malaysia) Fariqe Hairuman** **(Malaysia) Douglas Khoo** **(Malaysia) Melvin Moh**	**CUPRA León TCR**	**+13 Laps**	**441**
5	PA	8	(Belgium) AC Motorsport	(Belgium) Mathieu Detry (Belgium) Vincent Radermecker (United Kingdom) Stewart Lines (France) Stéphane Perrin	Audi RS 3 LMS TCR	+15 Laps	439
6	Am	**46**	(Belgium) **Burton Racing**	(Belgium) **Caren Burton** **(Belgium) Pierre-Yves Corthals** **(Belgium) Armand Fumal** **(Belgium) Oliver Meurens** **(Belgium) Philippe Steveny**	**Peugeot 308 TCR**	**+18 Laps**	**436**
7	PA	852	(Hong Kong) Teamwork Huff Motorsport	(Hong Kong) Alex Hui (Hong Kong) Samuel Hsieh (Hong Kong) Paul Poon (Hong Kong) Sunny Wong	Audi RS 3 LMS TCR	+26 Laps	428
8 DNF	Am	110	(Sweden) Lestrup Racing Team	(Sweden) Peter Fahlström (Sweden) Marcus Fluch (Sweden) Stefan Nilsson (Sweden) Mats Olsson	Volkswagen Golf GTI TCR	Accident/Gravel Trap	424
9 DNF	PA	22	(Hong Kong) Teamwork Huff Motorsport	(China) Yan Chuang (China) Rainey He (China) Neric Wei (Hong Kong) Andy Yan	Audi RS 3 LMS TCR	Retired	409
10 DNF	Am	125	(Netherlands) Bas Koeten Racing	(Hong Kong) Alex Au (Hong Kong) Eric Kwong (Hong Kong) Eric Lo (Macau) Kevin Tse	Audi RS 3 LMS TCR	Crash	361
11	Am	9	GDL Racing Team Australia	(Australia) Darryl Clarke (Australia) Clint Harvey (Australia) Brett Niall (Australia) Malcolm Niall (Finland) Rory Penttinen	Audi RS 3 LMS TCR	+98 Laps	356
12 DNF	Am	2	(Denmark) Holmgaard Motorsport	(Canada) Jérimy Daniel (Norway) Roy Edland (Denmark) Jonas Holmgaard (Denmark) Magnus Holmgaard (New Zealand) Rowan Shepherd	Volkswagen Golf GTI TCR	Engine oil and cooling	319
DNF	PA	33	(Austria) Wimmer Werk Motorsport	(Austria) Günter Benninger (Austria) Peter Gross (Austria) Hans Peter Eder (Austria) Christian Voithofer (Austria) Günther Wiesmeier	CUPRA León TCR	Crash	225
DNF	PA	85	(Germany) Vmax Engineering	(Canada) Steven Cho (United States) Charles Espenlaub (United States) Charles Putman (Belgium) Ward Sluys	Opel Astra TCR	Fire	187
DNF	Am	54	(Belgium) Ferda Autosport by QSR Racing	(United States) Chris Allen (United States) Lance Bergstein (United States) Ramana Lagemann (United States) Jon Miller	Audi RS 3 LMS TCR	Crash	127
DNF	Am	853	Macau PS Racing	(Macau) Filipe de Souza (Macau) Louis Ng (Macau) Kelvin Wong (Macau) Ryan Wong (Macau) Lam Kam San	Audi RS 3 LMS TCR	Crash damage	85
DNF	PA	175	(Netherlands) NKPP Racing by Bas Koeten Racing	(Netherlands) Gijs Bessem (Netherlands) Christiaan Frankenhout (Netherlands) Harry Hilders (Netherlands) Jaap van Lagen	CUPRA León TCR	Crash	27

== 2020 TCR Spa 500 ==
A 2020 edition of the TCR Spa 500, supposed to take part on May 2 and 3, was announced in February 2020. It was later cancelled.
