= Andy Yan =

Hong Kong racing driver (born 1983)

Cheuk Wai Yan
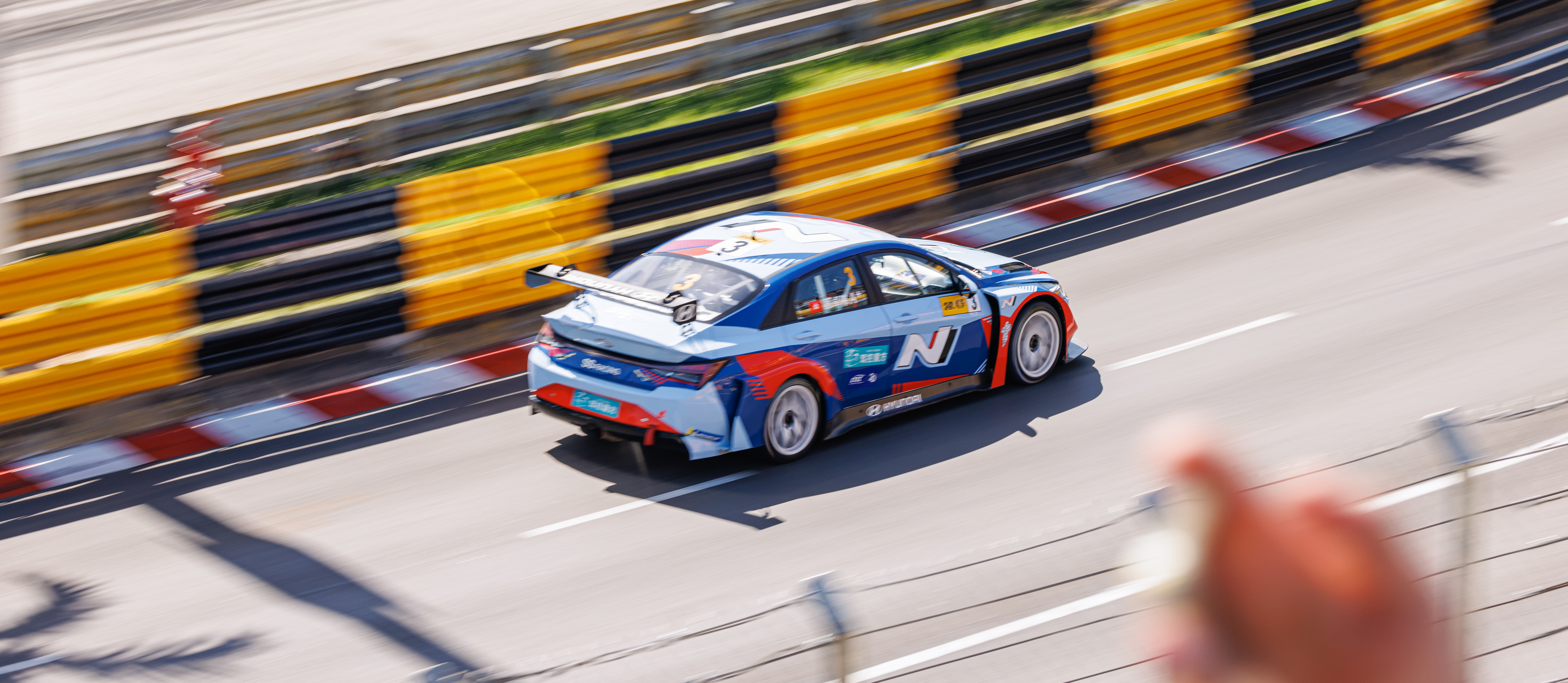
- Yan in 2023
- Nationality: Hong Konger
- Born: 21 October 1983 (age 43) British Hong Kong

TCR Asia Series career
- Debut season: 2015
- Current team: FRD HK Racing
- Car number: 63
- Starts: 3

Previous series
- 2011-15: CTCC

Championship titles
- CTCC TCR Asia Series TCR China Series: 2011, 2013 & 2015; 2016; 2017

Cheuk Wai "Andy" Yan (Chinese: 甄卓偉; born 21 October 1983) is a Hong Kong racing driver currently competing in the TCR Asia Series and Chinese Touring Car Championship.

== Racing career ==
Yan began his career in 2011 in the Chinese Touring Car Championship. He won the championship in 2011 and 2013, he ended second in 2012 and third in 2014. He still races there and currently leads the 2015 standings.

On 15 November 2014, Yan won the CTM Macau Touring Car Cup by leading the race from start to finish.

In September 2015, it was announced that Yan would race in the first ever TCR Asia Series round in Sepang, driving a Ford Focus ST for FRD HK Racing.

On 9 November 2015, Yan won his third China Touring Car Championship title by six points ahead of Honda driver Henry Ho. Yan overtook the Macanese driver during the race in order to be sure of the title.

On 2 October 2016, Yan, driving for Engstler Motorsport, secured the 2016 TCR Asia Series title with a round to spare.

On 28 December 2017, Yan won the 2017 TCR China Touring Car Championship. In the final event of the series, which took place at Guangdong International Circuit, Yan won the first sprint race at the wheel of his NewFaster Team Audi RS3 LMS, collecting the points he needed to secure the Drivers’ championship.

== Racing record ==
=== Complete TCR International Series results ===
(key) (Races in bold indicate pole position) (Races in italics indicate fastest lap)

Year	Team	Car	1	2	3	4	5	6	7	8	9	10	11	12	13	14	15	16	17	18	19	20	21	22	DC	Points
2016	Liqui Moly Team Engstler	Volkswagen Golf GTI TCR	BHR; 1	BHR; 2	POR; 1	POR; 2	BEL; 1	BEL; 2	ITA; 1	ITA; 2	AUT; 1	AUT; 2	GER; 1	GER; 2	RUS; 1	RUS; 2	THA; 1	THA; 2	SIN; 1	SIN; 2	MYS; 1; 12	MYS; 2; 8	MAC; 1; 19	MAC; 2; 10	25th	4.5

=== TCR Spa 500 results ===
Year	Team	Co-Drivers	Car	Class	Laps	Pos.	Class Pos.
2019	(Hong Kong) Teamwork Huff Motorsport	(China) Yan Chuang (China) Rainey He (Hong Kong) Neric Wei	Audi RS 3 LMS TCR	**PA**	409	9th DNF/Retired	4th DNF/Retired
