= Zhejiang International Circuit =

Motorsport track in Shaoxing, China

Zhejiang Circuit
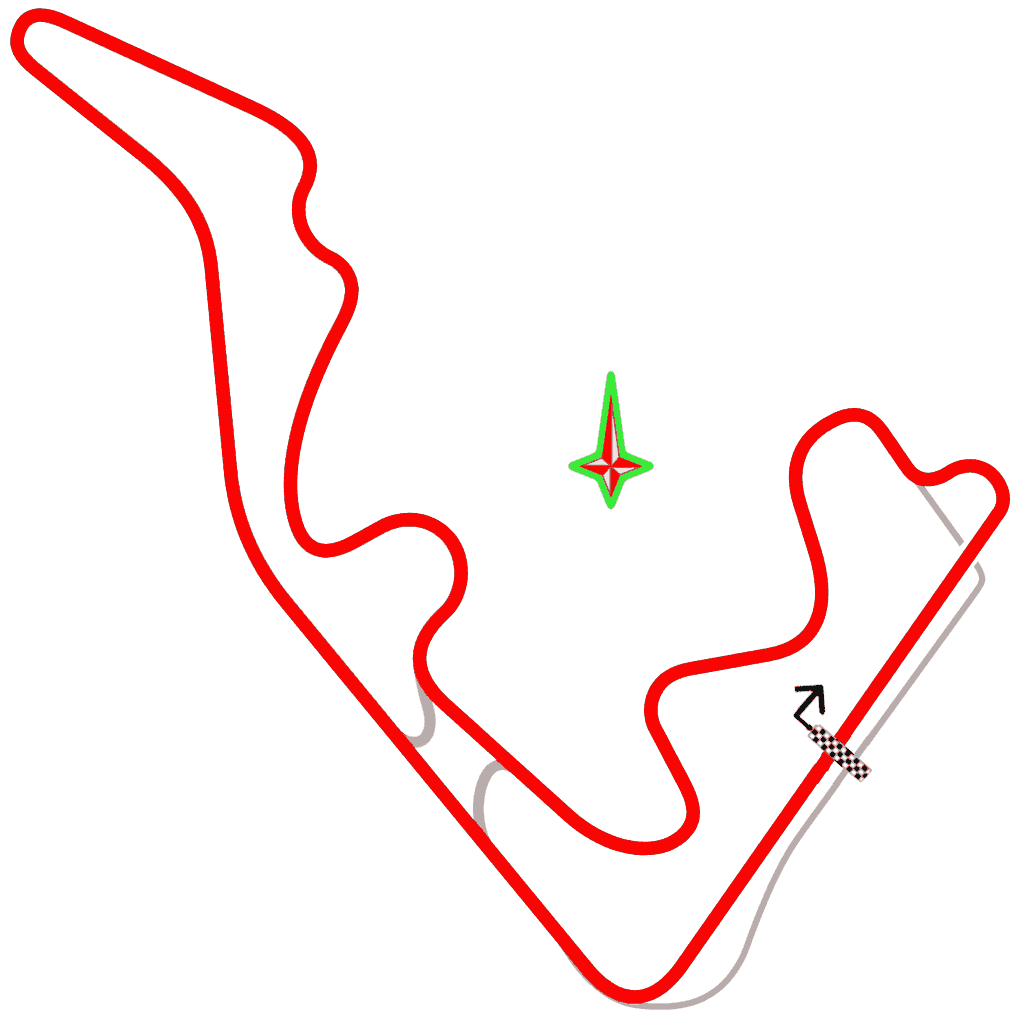
- Full Circuit (2016–present)
- Location: Shaoxing, Zhejiang, China
- Coordinates: 30°2′4.14″N 120°27′57.74″E
- FIA Grade: 2
- Broke ground: December 2013; 12 years ago
- Opened: 2016
- Architect: Apex Circuit Design
- Major events: Current: TCR World Tour (2026); TCR Asia (2017, 2019, 2022, 2026); TCR China (2017, 2019, 2023–present); China Touring Car Championship (2019, 2022–present); Former: TCR International Series (2017); Blancpain GT Series Asia (2017)
- Website: http://www.zhejiangcircuit.com/

Full Circuit (2016–present)
- Surface: Asphalt
- Length: 3.200 km (1.988 mi)
- Turns: 16
- Race lap record: 1:26.922 ( (China) Leo Ye, Ligier JS P3, 2017, LMP3)

East Circuit (2016–present)
- Surface: Asphalt
- Length: 1.540 km (0.957 mi)
- Turns: 8

West Circuit (2016–present)
- Surface: Asphalt
- Length: 1.610 km (1.000 mi)
- Turns: 10

The Zhejiang Circuit is a motorsport circuit in Shaoxing, Zhejiang, China. It was designed by Apex Circuit Design Ltd and opened in 2016.

== Events ==
Current

- October: TCR World Tour, TCR Asia Series, TCR China Touring Car Championship, China Touring Car Championship

Former

- Asian Formula Renault Series (2017)
- Audi R8 LMS Cup (2017)
- Blancpain GT Series Asia (2017)
- Chinese LMP3 Series (2017)
- Clio Cup China Series (2017)
- Ferrari Challenge Asia-Pacific (2017)
- TCR International Series (2017)

== Lap records ==
As of November 2022, the fastest official race lap records at the Zhejiang International Circuit are listed as:

Category	Time	Driver	Vehicle	Event
Full Circuit (2016–present): 3.200 km (1.988 mi)
LMP3	1:26.922	Leo Ye	Ligier JS P3	2017 Zhejiang Chinese LMP3 round
Formula Renault 2.0	1:32.101	Luo Kailuo	Tatuus FR2.0/13	2017 Zhejiang Asian Formula Renault round
TCR Touring Car	1:33.414	Jason Zhang	Lynk & Co 03 TCR	2022 2nd Zhejiang TCR Asia round
GT3	1:40.779	Alex Yoong	Audi R8 LMS GT3	2017 Zhejiang Blancpain GT Series Asia round
Clio Cup	1:44.499	David Lau	Renault Clio R.S. IV	2017 Zhejiang Clio Cup China round
GT4	1:48.804	Ringo Chong	Porsche Cayman GT4 Clubsport MR	2017 Zhejiang Blancpain GT Series Asia round
