= Sunny Wong (racing driver) =

Hong Kong racing driver

Yat Shing Wong 王日昇
- Nationality: Hong Kong
- Born: 29 July 1978 (age 48) British Hong Kong

TCR Asia Series career
- Debut season: 2015
- Current team: WestCoast Racing
- Car number: 28
- Starts: 2

Previous series
- 2014-15 2013 2010-12 2010-11, 13 2009: China Touring Car Championship; Asian Touring Car Series; Hong Kong Touring Car Championship; Asian Formula Renault Series; China Formula Campus

Yat Shing "Sunny" Wong (in Chinese):王日昇, born 29 July 1978) is a Hong Kong racing driver currently competing in the TCR Asia Series. Having previously competed in the China Touring Car Championship, Asian Touring Car Series, Hong Kong Touring Car Championship and Asian Formula Renault Series amongst others.

== Racing career ==
Wong began his career in 2009 in China Formula Campus. In 2010, he switched to the Asian Formula Renault Series, finishing sixth in the standings in 2013. He raced in the Hong Kong Touring Car Championship from 2010–12, winning the championship in 2012. In 2013, he raced in the Asian Touring Car Series, he finished the season second in the championship standings. In 2014, he switched to the China Touring Car Championship finishing fourth in the championship standings in 2015.

In November 2015, it was announced that Wong would race in the TCR Asia Series & TCR International Series, driving a Honda Civic TCR for WestCoast Racing.

On 25 July 2019, Teamwork Huff Motorsport ended its TCR UK programme, the team had entered Wong into the 2019 TCR UK series, committing to its entry before the news that the series was to be combined with the Touring Car Trophy.

On 18 November 2019, Wong took his Subaru Impreza WRX to a pole-to-flag win in the Macau Touring Car Cup. The race was called to an end only after seven laps, of which five were completed behind the safety car.

== Racing record ==
=== Complete TCR International Series results ===
(key) (Races in bold indicate pole position) (Races in italics indicate fastest lap)

Year	Team	Car	1	2	3	4	5	6	7	8	9	10	11	12	13	14	15	16	17	18	19	20	21	22	DC	Points
2015	WestCoast Racing	Honda Civic TCR	SEP; 1	SEP; 2	SHA; 1	SHA; 2	VAL; 1	VAL; 2	ALG; 1	ALG; 2	MNZ; 1	MNZ; 2	SAL; 1	SAL; 2	SOC; 1	SOC; 2	RBR; 1	RBR; 2	MRN; 1	MRN; 2	CHA; 1	CHA; 2	MAC; 1; 15	MAC; 2 Ret	NC	0
2016	Suncity Racing Team	Citroen C-Elysée	BHR; 1	BHR; 2	EST; 1	EST; 2	SPA; 1	SPA; 2	IMO; 1	IMO; 2	SAL; 1	SAL; 2	OSC; 1	OSC; 2	SOC; 1	SOC; 2	CHA; 1	CHA; 2	MRN; 1	MRN; 2	SEP; 1	SEP; 2	MAC; 1; 22	MAC; 2 Ret	NC	0

^{†} Driver did not finish the race, but was classified as he completed over 90% of the race distance.

=== TCR Spa 500 results ===
Year	Team	Co-Drivers	Car	Class	Laps	Pos.	Class Pos.
2019	(Hong Kong) Teamwork Huff Motorsport	(Hong Kong) Alex Hui (Hong Kong) Samuel Hsieh (Hong Kong) Paul Poon	Audi RS 3 LMS TCR	**PA**	428	7th	**3rd**
