= Paul Poon (racing driver) =

Paul Poon Tak Chun
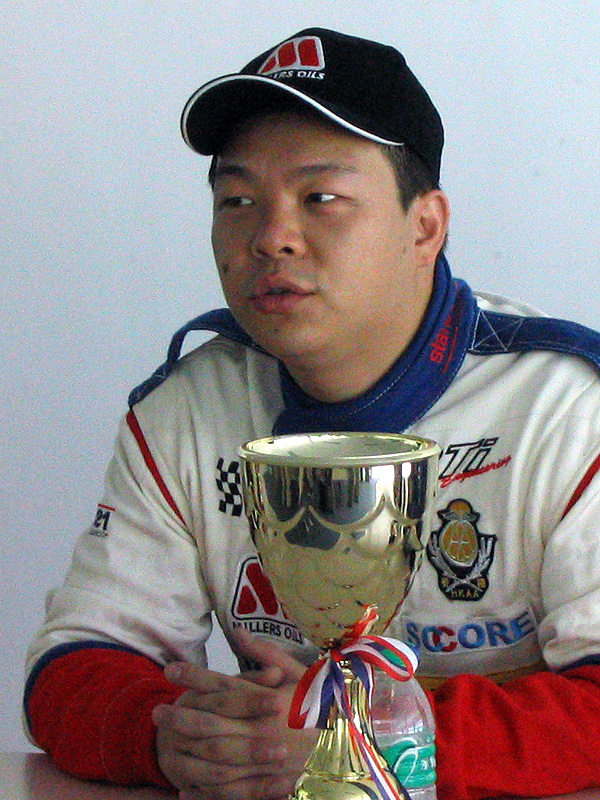
- Poon in 2004
- Nationality: Hong Konger
- Born: 12 March 1971 (age 55) British Hong Kong

Asian GT Masters career
- Debut season: 2009
- Current team: Pasa Racing
- Car number: 1

Previous series
- 2003-2008: Hong Kong Touring Car Championship

Championship titles
- 2003, 2008: Hong Kong Touring Car Championship

Paul Poon Tak Chun (born 12 March 1971, traditional Chinese: 潘德俊) is a racing driver from Hong Kong who has won the Hong Kong Touring Car Championship. He drives a Honda Civic EP3 for China Dragon Racing.

== Career ==
Poon is also the winner of the two previous editions of the CTM Cup (also known as Macau Cup) in 2006 and 2007, a race organized for the leading Asian touring car drivers.

In 2003, Poon entered the international Macau Guia race for Super Production cars, using a car built by Mardi Gras Motorsport in the United Kingdom, as the Hong Kong Touring Car Championship winner. He finished seventh, the highest finishing position for a Hong Kong driver in that race.

In 2004, Poon entered the Macau Guia race again. He did not finish in either Race 1 or 2.

For 2005, Poon hired a BMW 320i to take part in the World Touring Car Championship finale in Macau, but he failed to qualify for the race.

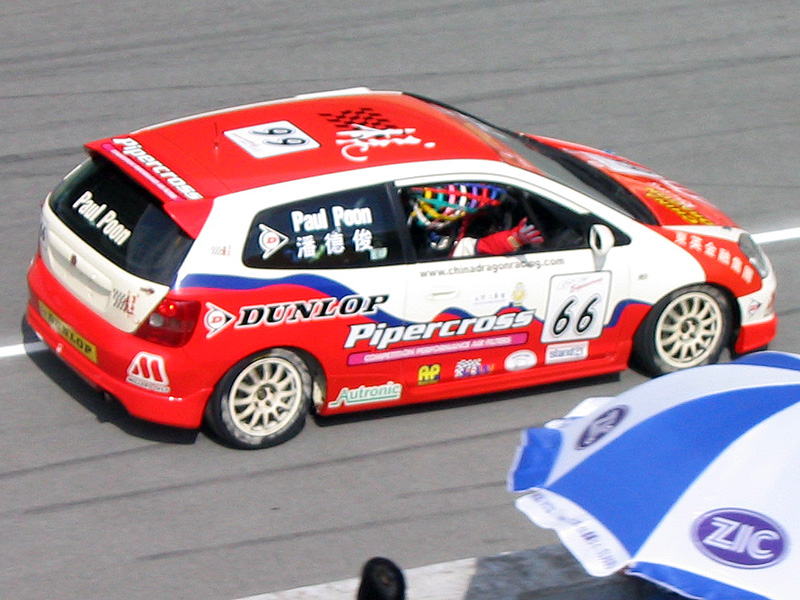
Paul Poon's Honda Civic EP3.

In both 2006 and 2007, Poon went back to race in the Super Production class. He won the CTM Macau Cup with China Dragon Racing both times. In 2006, he won the race by just 0.003 second from arch rival Kenneth Look. In 2007, he just managed to fend off the charging Masaki Kano's BMW 320i, winning by 0.198 second.

In 2008, Poon attempted to complete a hat-trick of CTM Macau Cup victories, after winning the Hong Kong Touring Car Championship again. But he failed to win.

In 2012, Poon led a China Dragon Racing 1-2 in qualifying for the CTM Macau Touring Car Cup, leading team-mate and 2011 race winner Samson Fung in the qualifying session. He then won the 2012 CTM Macau Touring Car Cup race, fighting off the advances of Team Pro Spec driver Andy Yan.

== Asian GT Masters and Macau GT Cup ==
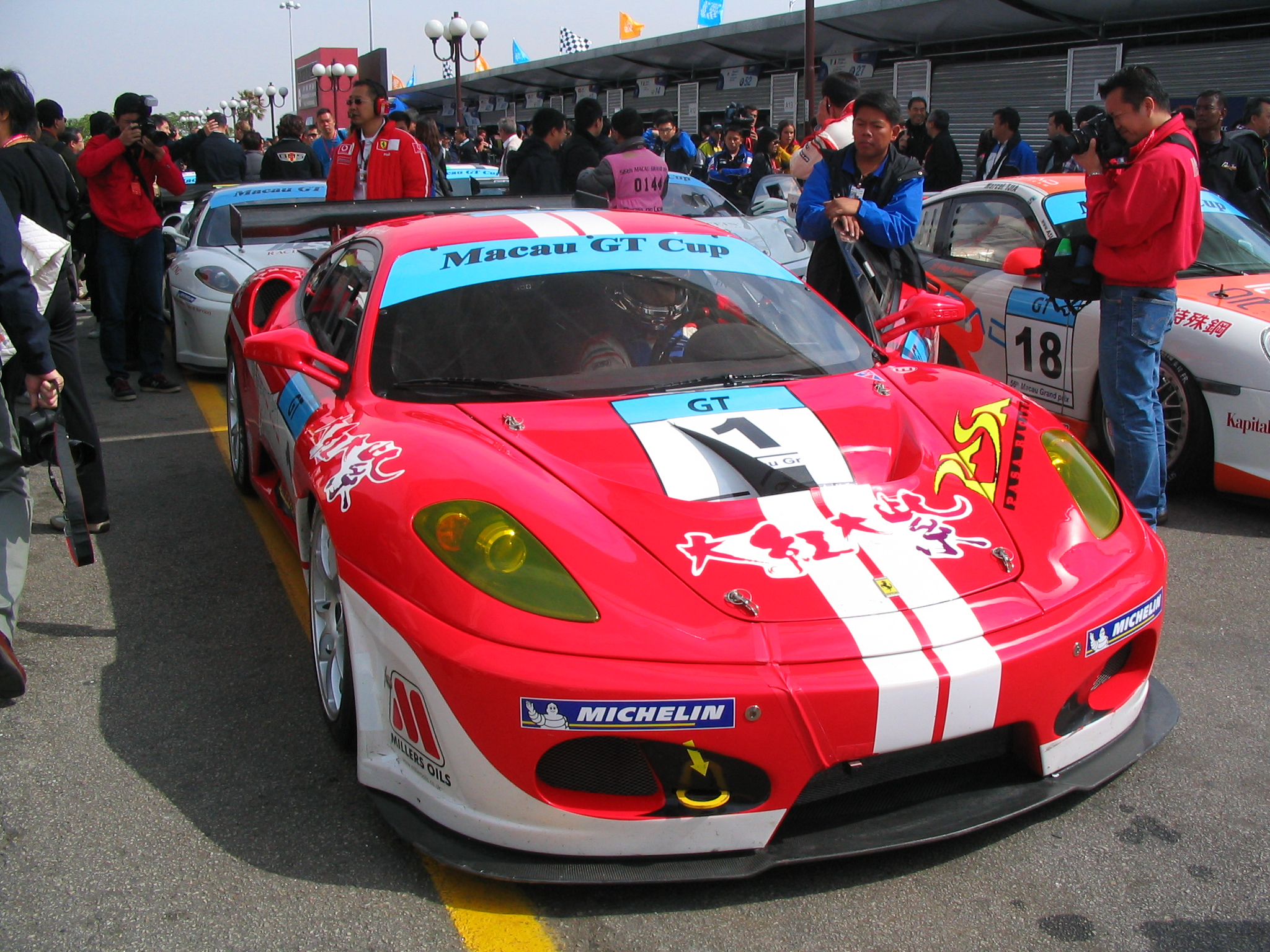
Paul Poon's PaSa Racing Ferrari 430 GT3.

In 2009, Poon joined PaSa Racing to race a Ferrari 430 GT3 in the Asian GT Masters series and the Macau GT Cup.

== Racing record ==
=== Complete World Touring Car Championship results ===
(key) (Races in bold indicate pole position) (Races in italics indicate fastest lap)

Year	Team	Car	1	2	3	4	5	6	7	8	9	10	11	12	13	14	15	16	17	18	19	20	DC	Points
2005	Engstler Motorsport	BMW 320i	ITA; 1	ITA; 2	FRA; 1	FRA; 2	GBR; 1	GBR; 2	SMR; 1	SMR; 2	MEX; 1	MEX; 2	BEL; 1	BEL; 2	GER; 1	GER; 2	TUR; 1	TUR; 2	ESP; 1	ESP; 2	MAC; 1 DNQ	MAC; 2 DNQ	NC	0

=== TCR Spa 500 results ===
Year	Team	Co-Drivers	Car	Class	Laps	Pos.	Class Pos.
2019	(Hong Kong) Teamwork Huff Motorsport	(Hong Kong) Alex Hui (Hong Kong) Samuel Hsieh (Hong Kong) Sunny Wong	Audi RS 3 LMS TCR	**PA**	428	7th	**3rd**
