= Hong Kong Touring Car Championship =

Car championship conducted by Hong Kong automobile association

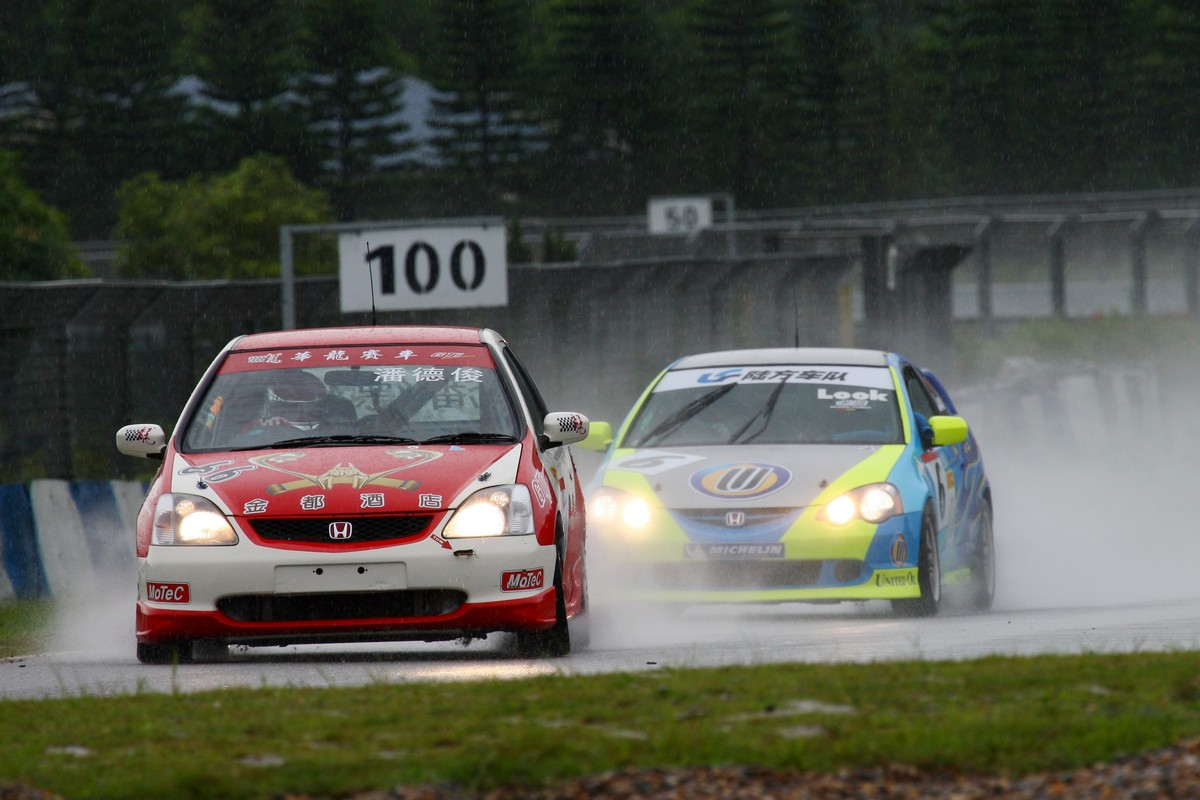
Paul Poon leads Kenneth Look in his Honda Civic EP3, July 2008

The Hong Kong Touring Car Championship (Chinese: 香港房車錦標賽) was established by the Hong Kong Automobile Association in 2002. The 2024 season was scheduled to include five rounds, at the Guangdong International Circuit, Zhuzhou International Circuit, V1 Auto World Tianjin, Sepang International Circuit and an unconfirmed circuit.

== The Championships ==
The Super Production Class and N2000 Class Championships each consists of 8 races at Zhuhai. For the Super Production Class, each race is 12 laps of 4.3 mi (7 km) while N2000 races are 10 laps only.

Points are awarded to the top 8 finishers in Super Production Class: 10–8–6–5–4–3–2–1.

Points are awarded to the top 15 finishers in N2000 Class: 40–35–32–30–28–26–25–24–23–22–21–20–19–18–17.

== Macau Grand Prix Qualification ==
=== 2006 ===
Provisionally, top 10 drivers in the Super Production Class qualified for the Macau Cup Race.

N2000 drivers were invited to take part in the Tourism Cup Race.

1600cc cars were no longer eligible.

=== 2005 ===
In 2005, the championship was run for 1600cc cars, N2000 cars and Super Production cars. After they qualify, 1600cc drivers had to use N2000 cars when they race in the Tourism Cup in Macau. Super Production class drivers entered the Macau Cup Race instead of the Guia Race.

=== 2002 ===
The championship competition had two classes of cars: 1600cc Group A and Super Production. The Macau Grand Prix event qualifiers were the 1600cc drivers and the qualified Super Production drivers entered the Guia Race.

== Super Production Class Champions ==
The first ever championship for Super Production cars was won by Henry Lee Junior in a Ford Focus, sponsored by Valvoline and run by GR Asia.

Paul Poon became the second champion when he won in a China Dragon Racing run Honda Civic EP3 in 2003. The car was bought by Paul from Mardi Gras Motorsport in the United Kingdom.

Kenneth Look has won the championship for 3 years consecutively, in 2004, 2005 and 2006.

== N2000 Class ==
- Fong Wai-Kee won the 2006 inaugural championship for N2000 cars for KK Racing.
- Tsang Tak-Fan won the 2005 overall championship for N2000 cars for Fusion Racing Team.

== Controversies ==
Championship leader Paul Poon was hit by Kenneth Look's teammate, Ronny Shum, in the fifth race of the 2004 championship and retired from the race; Kenneth Look won. The HKAA's failure to penalize Ronny Shum resulted in China Dragon Racing pulling out of the next race en masse after the warm-up lap. Kenneth Look subsequently won the 2004 title without much real opposition.

In November, China Dragon Racing had to apologize to the HKAA for bringing the sport into disrepute before being allowed to enter the Guia Race in Macau.

Phillip Yau Wing-choi, a touring car driver, was killed in a crash during qualifying at the Macau Grand Prix, one day after motorcyclist Luis Filipe de Sousa Carreira died in an accident on the same track.

== Super Production Class Champions ==
- 2006 Kenneth Look – Honda Integra DC5, Cheongs' Speed
- 2005 Kenneth Look – Honda Integra DC5, Cheongs' Speed
- 2004 Kenneth Look – Honda Integra DC5, Cheongs' Speed
- 2003 Paul Poon – Honda Civic EP3, China Dragon Racing
- 2002 Henry Lee Junior – Ford Focus ST170, GR Asia

== N2000 Class Champions ==
- 2006 Fong Wai-Kee – Honda Integra DC5, KK Racing
- 2005 Tsang Tak Fan – Honda Integra DC5, Fusion Racing Team
