= China Touring Car Championship =

- Category: Touring car
- Country: China
- Inaugural season: 2004, Renamed in 2009
- Classes: Super, Sports
- Drivers' champion: (China) Cao Hongwei
- Makes' champion: Beijing Hyundai
- Teams' champion: Shell Teamwork Lynk & Co
- Official website: www.ctcc.com.cn/en

The China Touring Car Championship (CTCC; Chinese: 中国汽车场地职业联赛; pinyin: Zhōngguó Qìchē Chǎngdì Zhíyè Liánsài) is a touring car racing series based in China and sanctioned by Lisheng Sports. It was established in 2004 following the opening of Shanghai International Circuit, and was known as the China Circuit Championship (CCC) between 2004 and 2008. The series currently consists of two classes - the TCR-based Super class, which has also been known as the TCR China Touring Car Championship since 2023, and the production car-based Sports Cup.

The series tried to join forces with the Japanese Touring Car Championship, which attempted to reboot itself in 2012.

== Champions ==
| Season | 2000cc | | 1600cc | | 1600T | |
| Season | Drivers' Champion | Teams' Champion | Drivers' Champion | Teams' Champion | Drivers' Champion | Teams' Champion |
|---|---|---|---|---|---|---|
| 2009 | (China) Lu Gan | Changan Ford Racing Team | (China) Wang Shaofeng | Kia778 Racing Team | Not contested | Not contested |
| 2010 | (Macau) Michael Ho | Changan Ford Racing Team | (China) Liu Yang | Beijing Hyundai | Not contested | Not contested |
| 2011 | (Hong Kong) Andy Yan | Changan Ford Racing Team | (China) Ma Qinghua | Haima Family Racing | (China) Wang Rui | Volkswagen 333 Racing |
| Season | Super Production | | | | Production | |
| Season | Drivers' Champion | | Teams' Champion | | Drivers' Champion | Teams' Champion |
| 2012 | (China) Han Han | | Changan Ford Racing Team | | (China) Martin Xie | Haima Family Racing |
| 2013 | (Hong Kong) Andy Yan | | Changan Ford Racing Team | | (China) Xu Chen | Haima Family Racing |
| 2014 | (China) Jiang Tengyi | | Changan Ford Racing Team | | (China) Cui Yue | Beijing Hyundai |
| Season | Super Production 1.6T | | Super Production 2.0T | | Production | |
| Season | Drivers' Champion | Teams' Champion | Drivers' Champion | Teams' Champion | Drivers' Champion | Teams' Champion |
| 2015 | (Hong Kong) Andy Yan | Changan Ford Racing Team | (China) Zhang Zhendong | Shanghai Volkswagen | (China) Xia Yu | Beijing Hyundai |
| 2016 | (China) Xie Xinzhe | Dongfeng Yueda KIA | (China) Zhang Zhendong | Changan Ford Racing Team | (China) Yang Xi | Beijing Hyundai |
| Season | Super Cup | | | | China/NGCC Cup | |
| Season | Drivers' Champion | | Teams' Champion | | Drivers' Champion | Teams' Champion |
| 2017 | (China) Zhu Daiwei | | Shanghai VW 333 Racing Team | | (China) Liu Yang | SAIC Volkswagen |
| 2018 | (China) Ye Hongli | | Dongfeng Yueda KIA | | (China) Liu Yang | GAC Toyota |
| 2019 | (China) Zhang Zhendong | | Dongfeng Yueda KIA | | (China) Yang Fan | Zongheng Racing Team |
| 2020 | (China) Zhang Zhendong | | Dongfeng Yueda KIA | | (China) Huang Fujin | Dongfeng Fengshen Racing Team |
| 2021 | (China) Zhang Zhiqiang | | Shanghai VW 333 Racing Team | | (China) Liu Yang | Dongfeng Fengshen Racing Team |
| 2022 | (China) Xie Xinzhe | | MG XPOWER | | (China) Liu Yang | Dongfeng Fengshen Racing Team |
| Season | Super Cup TCR China | | | | Sports Cup | |
| Season | Drivers' Champion | | Teams' Champion | | Drivers' Champion | Teams' Champion |
| 2023 | (China) Cao Hongwei | | Shell Teamwork Lynk & Co | | (China) Gao Ya'ou (China) He Yuan | Jiren Tianxiang Racing Team |
