= Robert Castagnon =

French armagnac producer and publisher (23 March 1920 - August 2004)

- Born: 23 March 1920; Margouët-Meymes, Gers, France
- Died: August 2004 (aged 84)

Robert Castagnon (23 March 1920 in Margouët-Meymes, Gers, France — August 2004) was an armagnac producer, publisher and founder of Circuit Paul Armagnac. He died in August 2004 at the age of 84 following a car crash.

== Motorsports ==
Robert Castagnon founded the Association Sportive Automobile de l'Armagnac in 1952 and held the first street circuit race around the town of Nogaro in 1953. After public safety concerns were raised following the 1955 Le Mans disaster it was difficult to gain permission for racing on the public roads. Robert Castagnon with his racing driver friend, Paul Armagnac set about to create a permanent circuit in Nogaro. After much political wrangling a parcel of land attached to the aerodrome was used to create Circuit Paul Armagnac and Robert Castagnon announced a race for September 1960, the Association had to postpone the first event until October. Facilities were fairly rudimentary still, but Bruno Basini became the first victor when he cross the lined in first place in the inaugural Nogaro Grand Prix, run to Formula Junior regulations at the first purpose built permanent race circuit in France.

== Publishing ==
=== La Talenquére and Gascogne-La Talenquére ===
The 'magazine of the South West' was founded in 1968 and ran until 2007. Branded as "La Talanquère" (1968–1989) and "Gascogne-La Talanquère" (1989–2007) was a periodic magazine on local Gascogne life including details about motor racing, course landaise, culture and history.

=== Books ===
Robert Castagnon authored several books between 1977 and 2003 about life and history in the region of Gascony.

== Course Landaise ==
Course landaise is an ancient form of bull fighting or bull jumping that involves no bloodshed. Robert Castagnon was a passionate supporter of the sport and created the annual Golden Horn (Corne D'or) event in 1959 held every 14 July at Nogaro. The event continues and celebrated its 50th anniversary in 2019. The arena in Nogaro was named after Robert Castagnon in 2005 following his death.
