= 2009 Formula Renault seasons =

2009 Formula Renault: Global

2009 Formula Renault

Seasons
- ← 2008 2010 →

This article describes all the 2009 seasons of Formula Renault series across the world.

== Calendar ==
This table indicates the round number of each Formula Renault series according to weekend dates. The dark note indicates Winter Series dates.

| Formula; Renault | March | | | | April | | | | May | | | | | June | | | | July | | | | August | | | | | September | | | | October | | | | | November | | | | December |
| Formula; Renault | 7–8 | 14–15 | 21–22 | 28–29 | 4–5 | 11–12 | 18–19 | 25–26 | 2–3 | 9–10 | 16–17 | 23–24 | 30–31 | 6–7 | 13–14 | 20–21 | 27–28 | 4–5 | 11–12 | 18–19 | 25–26 | 1–2 | 8–9 | 15–16 | 22–23 | 29–30 | 5–6 | 12–13 | 19–20 | 26–27 | 3–4 | 10–11 | 17–18 | 24–25 | 31-1 | 7–8 | 14–15 | 21–22 | 28–29 | 5–6 | 12–13 |
| WSbR | | | | | | | 1–2 | | 3–4 | | | 5 | | | 6–7 | | | 8–9 | | 10–11 | | 12–13 | | | | | | | 14–15 | | | | | 16–17 |
| V6 Asia | | | | | | | | | | | | | 1–2 | | | 3–4 | | | | | | | | 5-6-7 | | | | | 8-9-10 | | | | | 11–12 |
| Eurocup | | | | | | | 1–2 | | 3–4 | | | | | | 5–6 | | | 7–8 | | 9–10 | | | | | | | | | 11–12 | | | | | 13–14 |
| WEC | | | | | | 1–2 | 3–4 | | | | 5–6 | | 7–8 | 9–10 | | | | | | | | | | | | | | | | | | 11–12 | | | | 13–14 |
| UK | | | | | 1–2 | | | 3–4 | | | 5–6 | | 7–8 | | 9–10 | | | 11–12 | | | | 13–14 | | | | 15–16 | | | 17–18 | | 19–20 | | | | 1–2 | 3–4 |
| BARC | | | | | | | | | | | | 1 | | | | | 2–3 | | 4–5 | | | | 6 | | 7–8 | | 9–10 | | | | | 11 | | | 1–2 | 3–4 |
| Italy | | | | | 1–2 | | | | | | | 3–4 | | | 5–6 | | 7–8 | | | | 9–10 | | | | | | | 11–12 | | | | 13–14 |
| NEC | | | | | | 1–2 | | 3–4 | | | | | | | 5–6 | 7–8 | | | | | | | 9–10 | | | 11–12 | | | 13–14 | | 15–16 |
| Switzerland | | | | | | 1–2 | | | | | 3–4 | | | 5–6 | | | | | | 7–8 | | | 9–10 | | | | | | | 11–12 |
| Finland | | | | | | | | | | | 1–2 | 3–4 | | | 5–6 | | | | | | | | 7–8 | | | | 9–10 |
| Sweden | | | | | | | | | | | | 1–2 | | | | | | | 3–4 | | | | | 5–6 | 7–8 | | 9–10 | 11–12 |
| Asia | | | a-b | | | | | | | | | 1–2 | | | | | | | 3–4 | | | | | | 5–6 | | | 7–8 | | | | | | 9–10 | | 11–12 |
| 'Academy | | | | | | | | | 1–2 | | 3–4 | | | | | 5–6 | | | | | 7–8 | | | | | | | | 9–10 | | 11–12 | | | 13–14 |
| Argentina | 1 | | | | | 2 | | | 3 | | 4 | | | 5 | | | 6 | | | 7 | | | 8 | | | 9 | | | 10–11 | | | 12 | | | 13 | | | 14 | | 15 |

== Formula Renault 3.5L ==
=== Collective test for notable 2.0L drivers ===
Each year, Renault Sport Technologies invite the best Formula Renault 2.0L and some other drivers to test the Formula Renault 3.5L car. This season, the test occurred in October on the new Motorland Aragón track in Spain. The table present all invited drivers:

| Driver | Team | Note |
|---|---|---|
| (France) Nathanaël Berthon | Tech 1 Racing | |
| (Spain) Albert Costa | Epsilon Euskadi | |
| (Portugal) António Félix da Costa | P1 Motorsport | |
| (Finland) Jukka Honkavuori | RC Motorsport | |
| (Japan) Takuto Iguchi | Pons Racing | Runner-up of All-Japan F3. |
| (Denmark) Kevin Magnussen | Pons Racing | |
| (Italy) Daniel Mancinelli | International Draco Racing | |
| (Spain) Celso Míguez | KMP Group/SG Formula | Leader European F3 Open series. |
| (Switzerland) Nico Müller | Prema Powerteam | |
| (Australia) Daniel Ricciardo | Carlin Motorsport | Winner of the British F3 season. |
| (Angola) Luís Sá Silva | Interwetten.com Racing | |
| (United Kingdom) Dean Smith | Comtec Racing | |
| (Denmark) Marco Sørensen | RC Motorsport | |
| (France) Jean-Éric Vergne | Mofaz Fortec Motorsport and KMP Group/SG Formula | |

== Formula Renault 2.0L ==
=== 2009 Formula Renault 2.0 West European Cup season ===
his is the second season of the WEC series. It include the French Formula Renault championship rewarding the best French driver (F) and reward also the Rookies driver (R).

- Point system : 15, 12, 10, 8, 6, 5, 4, 3, 2, 1 for 10th. In each race 1 point for Fastest lap and 1 for Pole position.
- Races : 2 race by rounds (first between 60 and 80 km, second between 20 and 30 minutes).

| Pos | Driver | Team | (France) NOG April 11–12 | | (Spain) CAT April 18–19 | | (France) PAU May 16–17 | | (France) MAG May 30–31 | | (Belgium) SPA June 5–6 | | (Spain) VAL October 10–11 | | (Portugal) ALG November 7–8 | | Points | Points (F) | Points (R) |
| Pos | Driver | Team | 1 | 2 | 3 | 4 | 5 | 6 | 7 | 8 | 9 | 10 | 11 | 12 | 13 | 14 | Points | Points (F) | Points (R) |
|---|---|---|---|---|---|---|---|---|---|---|---|---|---|---|---|---|---|---|---|
| 1 | (Spain) Albert Costa | Epsilon Euskadi | 5 | 4 | 2 | 10 | 1 | 1 | 1 | 1 | Ret | 1 | 2 | 2 | 1 | 1 | 172 | | |
| 2 | (France) Jean-Éric Vergne | SG Formula | 1 | 1 | 1 | 2 | Ret | 10 | 8 | 3 | 2 | 3 | 1 | 1 | 3 | 6 | 143 | 93 | |
| 3 | (France) Nathanaël Berthon | Epsilon Euskadi | 6 | 7 | 5 | 5 | 3 | 3 | 2 | 2 | 1 | 2 | 3 | 4 | Ret | 4 | 120 | 108 | |
| 4 | (Spain) Miquel Monrás | SG Formula | 2 | 3 | 4 | 3 | 5 | 6 | Ret | 4 | 3 | 4 | 7 | 3 | 2 | 2 | 117 | | |
| 5 | (France) Julien Abelli | SG Formula | 7 | 2 | 6 | 1 | 4 | 4 | 3 | 6 | 7 | 6 | | | | | 77 | 67 | |
| 6 | (France) Arthur Pic | SG Formula | 4 | 12 | 3 | 4 | Ret | 7 | Ret | Ret | Ret | 8 | 5 | 5 | 4 | 3 | 65 | 47 | 110 |
| 7 | (Colombia) Carlos Muñoz | Epsilon Euskadi | 10 | 14 | 13 | 8 | 2 | 2 | 4 | 9 | 6 | 10 | 4 | 7 | Ret | 7 | 60 | | |
| 8 | (Spain) Miguel Otegui | Epsilon Euskadi | | | | | Ret | 11 | 6 | 5 | 4 | Ret | 6 | 6 | 6 | 5 | 40 | | |
| 9 | (United Arab Emirates) Ramez Azzam | SG Formula | 3 | 10 | 9 | 9 | 7 | 8 | 5 | 7 | Ret | 5 | | | | | 38 | | |
| 10 | (France) Benjamin Lariche | Pole Services | 9 | 8 | 10 | 6 | 10 | Ret | 7 | 8 | 5 | 9 | 10 | 9 | 7 | 9 | 36 | 47 | |
| 11 | (France) Hugo Valente | SG Formula | 13 | 11 | 7 | 7 | 9 | Ret | Ret | Ret | Ret | 7 | 8 | 8 | 5 | 8 | 29 | 31 | 93 |
| 12 | (France) Kevin Breysse | SG Formula | 8 | 5 | 12 | 11 | 8 | 9 | | | | | | | | | 14 | 34 | 70 |
| 13 | (United Kingdom) Luciano Bacheta | Epsilon Sport | | | | | 6 | 5 | | | | | | | | | 11 | | |
| 14 | (New Zealand) Dominic Storey | SG Formula | 12 | 6 | 8 | Ret | | | | | | | | | | | 8 | | 32 |
| 15 | (Spain) Marcello Conchado | Amiter Galuppo Sport | | | Ret | 13 | | | 9 | Ret | | | 9 | Ret | | | 4 | | |
| 16 | (France) Bastien Borget | Pole Services | Ret | 9 | | | | | | | | | | | | | 2 | 5 | |
| nc | (France) Jérôme Sornicle | Pole Services | | | | | 11 | 12 | | | | | | | | | 0 | 10 | |
| nc | (France) Arno Santamato | Epsilon Sport | | | | | 12 | 13 | | | | | | | | | 0 | 8 | 32 |
| nc | (France) Daniel Harout | Lycée d'Artagnan | 11 | 13 | | | | | | | | | | | | | 0 | 6 | |
| nc | (France) Grégoire Demoustier | TCS Racing | 14 | Ret | | | | | | | | | | | | | 0 | 2 | 6 |
| nc | (Switzerland) Zoël Amberg | Jenzer Motorsport | | | 11 | 12 | | | | | | | | | | | 0 | | 16 |
| nc | (United States) Robert Siska | KEO Racing | | | 14 | 14 | | | | | | | | | | | 0 | | |

| Pos | Team | Points |
|---|---|---|
| 1 | (Spain) Epsilon Euskadi | 242 |
| 2 | (France) SG Formula | 212 |
| 3 | (France) SG Driver's Project | 101 |
| 4 | (France) Pole Services | 32 |
| 5 | (France) Epsilon Sport | 11 |
| 6 | (Spain) Amiter Galuppo Sport | 4 |
| nc | (Switzerland) Jenzer Motorsport | 0 |
| nc | (United States) KEO Racing | 0 |
| nc | (India) TCS Racing | 0 |
| nc | (France) Lycée d'Artagnan | 0 |

=== 2009 Formula Renault 2.0 UK season ===
==== 2009 Formula Renault 2.0 UK Winter Cup ====
The Formula Renault UK Winter Cup and Formula Renault BARC Winter Cup are held in same time, but with separated classification.

- Point system : 32, 28, 25, 22, 20, 18, 16, 14, 12, 11, 10, 9, 8, 7, 6, 5, 4, 3, 2, 1.
- 2 races in each round between 30 miles (48 km) and 30 minutes.

| Pos | Driver | Team | (England) Snetterton October 31 | | (England) Rockingham November 7 | | Points UK | Points BARC |
| Pos | Driver | Team | 1 | 2 | 3 | 4 | Points UK | Points BARC |
|---|---|---|---|---|---|---|---|---|
| 1 | (United Kingdom) Harry Tincknell | CRS Racing | 1* | 1 | 3 | 2 | 119 | |
| 2 | (United Kingdom) Nick Yelloly | Hitech Junior Team | 2 | 6 | 4 | 3 | 93 | |
| 3 | (Bahrain) Menasheh Idafar | Manor Competition | 4 | 2* | 6 | 6 | 88 | |
| 4 | (Netherlands) Thomas Hylkema | Manor Competition | 3 | 3 | 7 | 5 | 86 | |
| 5 | (Philippines) Marlon Stöckinger | Hitech Junior Team | 5 | 10 | 2 | 4 | 81 | |
| 6 | (Italy) Dino Zamparelli | Fortec Motorsport (1-2); Antel Motorsport (3-4) | 7 | 5 | 5 | 8 | 70 | |
| 7 | (Sweden) Tom Blomqvist | Fortec Motorsport | | | 1* | 1* | 68 | |
| 8 | (United Kingdom) David McDonald | Manor Competition | 6 | 4 | Ret | 7 | 56 | |
| 9 | (United Kingdom) Joseph Reilly | Hillspeed | 12 | 11 | 9 | 11 | 41 | |
| 10 | (United Kingdom) Alex Lynn | Fortec Motorsport | 8 | 8 | Ret | 9 | 40 | |
| 11 | (United Kingdom) Luke Wright | Fortec Motorsport | 9 | 7 | Ret | 10 | 39 | |
| 12 | (United Kingdom) Robert Foster-Jones | Manor Competition | 10 | 9 | 8 | Ret | 37 | |
BARC Winter Cup
| 1 | (United Kingdom) Matthew Draper | Antel Motorsport | 11* | 12* | | | | 32 |

=== 2009 Formula Renault BARC season ===
The final standing was established with the best 10 results of the season. A Club Class (c) classification is also established for young drivers they participe on the same race as the FR2000 series

- Point system : 32, 28, 25, 22, 20, 18, 16, 14, 12, 11, 10, 9, 8, 7, 6, 5, 4, 3, 2, 1 for 20th. In each race 1 point for Fastest lap and 1 point for Pole position.
- Races are between 30 miles (48 km) and 30 minutes.

Results after round 11, standing after round 7:

| Pos | Driver | Team | (England) Oulton Park Island May 23 | (England) Snetterton June 27–28 | | (England) Croft July 11–12 | | (England) Donington August 8–9 | | (England) Brands Hatch Indy August 22–23 | | (England) Rockingham September 5–6 | | (England) Thruxton October 10–11 | | Points (1) |
| Pos | Driver | Team | 1 | 2 | 3 | 4 | 5 | 6 | 7 | 8 | 9 | 10 | 11 | 12 | 13 | Points (1) |
|---|---|---|---|---|---|---|---|---|---|---|---|---|---|---|---|---|
| 1 | (United Kingdom) Kieren Clark | Apotex Scorpio Motorsport | 1* | 1* | 1* | 1* | 1* | 2* | 4 | 1* | 1* | 1* | Ret | | | 324 |
| 2 | (Oman) Ahmad Al Harthy | Hillspeed | 3 | 3 | 4 | 2 | 5 | 5 | 8 | 4 | 4 | 6 | 3 | 2* | 2* | 287 |
| 3 | (Italy) Dino Zamparelli | Reon Motorsport | 2 | 16 | 5 | Ret | 2 | 1 | 1* | 3 | 2 | 2 | Ret | 3 | 1 | 286 |
| 4 | (United Kingdom) Josh Mulholland | Alpine Motorsport | 6 | 5 | 3 | 3 | 4 | 3 | 3 | 5 | 10 | 4 | 1 | 1 | Ret | 277 |
| 5 | (United Kingdom) Brett Parris | Antel Motorsport | 4 | 4 | 2 | 5 | 7 | 4 | 2 | 8 | 5 | 3 | 2 | Ret | 3 | 270 |
| 6 | (United Kingdom) James Theodore | Hillspeed | Ret | 8 | 6 | 9 | 6 | 8 | 9 | 9 | 6 | 5 | 12 | 4 | 6 | 189 |
| 7 | (United Kingdom) Don De Graaff | Tempus Sport(1–5);Bamboo Engineering(6–12) | 7 | 2 | 8 | 4 | 9 | 15 | 6 | 15 | 8 | 10 | 6 | 12 | 11 | 175 |
| 8 | (Iran) Kourosh Khani | Welch Motorsport | 8 | 11 | Ret | Ret | 10 | 7 | 5 | 6 | 7 | 7 | 4 | 9 | 12 | 164 |
| 9 | (United Kingdom) Archie Hamilton | Welch Motorsport(1–5);Antel Motorsport(6–12) | 14 | 13 | 7 | 11 | 13 | 10 | 7 | 7 | 3 | 12 | 8 | 10 | 9 | 156 |
| 10 | (United Kingdom) Joe Crook | Apotex Scorpio Motorsport | 10 | Ret | Ret | 6 | 8 | 6 | Ret | 2 | Ret | 9 | 10 | 5 | 4 | 154 |
| 11 | (United Kingdom) David Sutton | Team Avago | 9 | Ret | 10 | 8 | 12 | 12 | 10 | 10 | 9 | 11 | 5 | 8 | 8 | 147 |
| 12 | (United Kingdom) Steven Durrant (c) | Driver | DSQ | 9 | Ret | 10 | Ret | 11 | Ret | 12 | Ret | 8 | 9 | 6 | 5 | 116 |
| 13 | (United Kingdom) Andrew Jarman (c) | Driver | 12 | 14 | Ret | 12 | 14 | 13 | 12 | 13 | 13 | 16 | 11 | 11 | 10 | 109 |
| 14 | (Belgium) Jordi Weckx | Apex Engineering with Alpine Motorsport | 13 | 10 | Ret | Ret | 11 | | | 14 | 11 | 13 | 7 | | | 70 |
| 15 | (Croatia) Sasha Radola | Tempus Sport(4–5);Bamboo Engineering(6–7) | | | | 7 | 3 | 9 | 13 | | | | | | | 61 |
| 16 | (United Kingdom) Alex Craven (c) | Driver | 15 | Ret | DNS | 13 | 15 | Ret | Ret | 17 | 16 | Ret | 14 | Ret | 16 | 41 |
| 17 | (United Kingdom) Kenny Andrews | Welch Motorsport | 5 | 6 | Ret | | | | | | | | | | | 38 |
| 18 | (United Kingdom) Jack Piper | Falcon Motorsport | | | | | | Ret | Ret | 18 | 14 | 14 | 13 | 14 | 15 | 38 |
| 19 | (France) Pierre Renom (c) | Driver | | | | | | 14 | Ret | | | 15 | 15 | 13 | 14 | 36 |
| 20 | (Republic of Ireland) Ellis Harkins | Hillspeed | 11 | Ret | 9 | 14 | 16 | | | | | | | | | 34 |
| 21 | (United Kingdom) Luke Wright | Welch Motorsport | | | | | | | | | | | | 7 | 7 | 32 |
| 22 | (United Kingdom) Callum Holland | Tempus Sport | 17 | 7 | Ret | DNS | Ret | | | | | | | | | 20 |
| 23 | (United Kingdom) Alexander Jeffrey | Hillspeed | | 12 | Ret | | | Ret | 11 | | | | | | | 19 |
| 24 | (United Kingdom) Roberto Tirone (c) | Driver | | 16 | Ret | | | | | 16 | 15 | | | | | 18 |
| 25 | (United Kingdom) Adam Butler | Bamboo Engineering | | | | | | | | | | | | 15 | 13 | 14 |
| 26 | (United Kingdom) Craig Harris | Blackpool & The Fylde College | 16 | | | | | | | | | | | | | 5 |
| nc | (Denmark) Kasper Krogh | Bamboo Engineering | | | | | | | | 11 | 12 | | | | | – |

- (1) = Points include only the best 10 results
- (c) = Club Class drivers

==== 2009 Formula Renault BARC Winter Cup ====
See 2009 Formula Renault 2.0 UK Winter Cup.

=== 2009 Formula Renault 2.0 Italia season ===
- Point system : 32, 28, 24, 22, 20, 18, 16, 14, 12, 10, 8, 6, 4, 2, 1 for 15th. In each race 2 point for Fastest lap and 2 for Pole position.
- Races : 2 race by rounds length of 30 minutes each.

| Pos | Driver | Team | (Italy) MNZ April 4–5 | | (Italy) VAR May 23–24 | | (Hungary) HUN June 13–14 | | (Belgium) SPA June 27–28 | | (Italy) MIS July 25–26 | | (Italy) MUG September 12–13 | | (Italy) IMO October 10–11 | | Points |
| Pos | Driver | Team | 1 | 2 | 3 | 4 | 5 | 6 | 7 | 8 | 9 | 10 | 11 | 12 | 13 | 14 | Points |
|---|---|---|---|---|---|---|---|---|---|---|---|---|---|---|---|---|---|
| 1 | (Italy) Daniel Mancinelli | One Racing | 9* | 1 | 1* | 3 | 3 | 4 | 3 | 1* | 1* | 15* | 1* | 1* | 2 | Ret | 353 |
| 2 | (Spain) Genís Olivé | Jenzer Motorsport | Ret | DNS | 4 | 2* | 1* | 1* | 14 | 2 | 14 | 2 | 2 | 3 | 3* | 2* | 292 |
| 3 | (Italy) Giovanni Venturini | CO2 Motorsport | Ret | 3 | | | 2 | 9 | 2 | 3 | 2 | 1 | 3 | 2 | 4 | 3 | 274 |
| 4 | (Switzerland) Zoël Amberg | Jenzer Motorsport | Ret | DNS | 10 | 6 | Ret | 6 | 6 | 6 | 5 | 4 | 4 | 8 | 1 | 1 | 228 |
| 5 | (Canada) Tyler Dueck | BVM Minardi Team | 1 | 4* | 13 | 7 | 9 | 8 | 8 | 5 | Ret | 5 | 8 | 11 | 6 | 4 | 218 |
| 6 | (Switzerland) Stefano Comini | CO2 Motorsport | Ret | 2 | 3 | 4 | 4 | 3 | 4 | 15 | 15 | 14 | 6 | 4 | | | 192 |
| 7 | (Portugal) Bernardo Arnaut | CO2 Motorsport | 8 | 10 | 5 | 5 | 11 | DSQ | 5 | 12 | 6 | 6 | Ret | 5 | 7 | 9 | 182 |
| 8 | (Italy) Federico Scionti | One Racing(1–10);Facondini by Draco Racing(10–14) | Ret | 9 | 2 | 1 | 5 | 2 | DNS | DNS | 4 | 8 | DSQ | DNS | | | 156 |
| 9 | (Chile) Martin Scuncio | CO2 Motorsport | Ret | 7 | | | 12 | 13 | 1* | 4 | 3 | 3 | | | | | 132 |
| 10 | (Italy) Antonino Pellegrino | Scuderia Antonino | 10 | 13 | 7 | 11 | 7 | 12 | 11 | 11 | 8 | 12 | | | 11 | 7 | 120 |
| 11 | (Slovakia) Nikolas Kvašai | Facondini by Draco Racing | 7 | 12 | 8 | 8 | 6 | 5 | 13 | 8 | Ret | 9 | | | | | 118 |
| 12 | (Italy) Andrea Roda | BVM Minardi Team | 3 | 5 | 11 | Ret | 8 | 10 | | | 13 | Ret | Ret | 10 | 8 | 12 | 112 |
| 13 | (France) Romain Vozniak | Facondini by Draco Racing | Ret | 8 | 12 | 9 | 10 | 11 | 12 | 13 | 12 | 11 | Ret | 13 | 9 | 8 | 106 |
| 14 | (Italy) Eddie Cheever | Jenzer Motorsport | | | | | | | 10 | 9 | 9 | Ret | 9 | 9 | 5 | 5 | 98 |
| 15 | (Brazil) André Negrão | Cram Competition | | | | | | | | | 7 | 7 | 7 | 6 | | | 66 |
| 16 | (Italy) Stefano Colombo | Cram Competition | 5 | 11 | | | | | | | 10 | 10 | | | | | 48 |
| 17 | (Italy) Cristian Corsini | CG Motorsport | 2 | 6 | | | | | | | | | | | | | 46 |
| 18 | (Netherlands) Thomas Hylkema | BVM Minardi Team | | | | | | | | | | | 5 | 7 | | | 36 |
| 19 | (Austria) Bianca Steiner | Steiner Motorsport | 4 | Ret | 9 | Ret | | | | | | | | | | | 34 |
| 20 | (Italy) Giacomo Barri | Cram Competition | | | | | | | 7 | 7 | | | | | | | 32 |
| 21 | (Poland) Jakub Śmiechowski | Kochanski Motorsport Project | | | | | | | 15 | 14 | | | 10 | 12 | Ret | 10 | 29 |
| 22 | (Italy) Marco Betti | Facondini by Draco Racing | Ret | DSQ | 6 | 10 | | | | | | | | | | | 28 |
| 23 | (Italy) Andrea Amici | Cram Competition | | | | | | | 9 | 10 | | | | | | | 22 |
| 24 | (Germany) Thiemo Storz | CO2 Motorsport | | | | | 13 | 7 | | | | | | | | | 20 |
| 25 | (Italy) Mattia Brugiotti | Tomcat Racing | 6 | 16 | | | | | | | | | | | | | 18 |
| 26 | (Italy) Leonardo Osmieri | Team Dueppì | | | | | | | | | | | | | DNS | 6 | 18 |
| 27 | (Russia) Maxim Zimin | Jenzer Motorsport | | | | | | | | | | | | | 12 | 11 | 14 |
| 28 | (Brazil) Francisco Weiler | Team Dueppì | | | | | | | | | | | | | 10 | 13 | 14 |
| 29 | (Italy) Vittoria Piria | Tomcat Racing | | | | | | | | | 13 | 13 | | | | | 8 |
| 30 | (Italy) Matteo Davenia | Cram Competition | Ret | 14 | | | | | | | | | | | | | 2 |
| 31 | (Italy) Federico Vecchi | Linerace Technology | Ret | 15 | | | | | | | | | | | | | 1 |
| 32 | (Italy) Stefano Carlet | Linerace Technology | Ret | Ret | | | | | | | | | | | | | 0 |

| Pos | Team | Points |
|---|---|---|
| 1 | (Italy) CO2 Motorsport | 690 |
| 2 | (Switzerland) Jenzer Motorsport | 578 |
| 3 | (Italy) One Racing | 509 |
| 4 | (Italy) BVM Minardi Team | 362 |
| 5 | (Italy) Facondini by Draco Racing | 244 |
| 6 | (Italy) Cram Competition | 170 |
| 7 | (Italy) Scuderia Antonino | 120 |
| 8 | (Italy) CG Motorsport | 46 |
| 9 | (Austria) Steiner Motorsport | 34 |
| 10 | (Italy) Team Dueppì | 32 |
| 11 | (Poland) Kochanski Motorsport Project | 29 |
| 12 | (Italy) Tomcat Racing | 26 |
| 13 | (Italy) Linerace Technology | 1 |

=== 2009 LO Formule Renault 2.0 Suisse season ===
- Point system : 25, 22, 20, 18, 16, 14, 12, 10, 8, 6, 5, 4, 3, 2, 1 for 15th. Extra 1 point for Fastest lap and 2 points for Pole position.
- Races : 2 race by rounds.

| Pos | Driver | Team | (France) DIJ April 11–12 | | (Germany) NUR May 16–17 | | (Belgium) SPA June 6–7 | | (France) LEM July 18–19 | | (France) MAG August 8–9 | | (Italy) MNZ September 26–27 | | Points |
| Pos | Driver | Team | 1 | 2 | 3 | 4 | 5 | 6 | 7 | 8 | 9 | 10 | 11 | 12 | Points |
|---|---|---|---|---|---|---|---|---|---|---|---|---|---|---|---|
| 1 | (Switzerland) Nico Müller | Jenzer Motorsport | 1* | 1* | 1* | 1* | 2 | 2 | 1* | 2* | 1* | 1* | 1 | 1 | 317 |
| 2 | (Italy) Giovanni Venturini | CO2 Motorsport | 3 | 4 | 2 | 3 | 1* | 1* | 2 | 1 | 4 | 2 | 2* | 2 | 270 |
| 3 | (Germany) Thiemo Storz | CO2 Motorsport | 2 | 2 | 6 | 5 | Ret | 4 | 3 | 6 | 2 | 6 | 6 | Ret | 176 |
| 4 | (Switzerland) Fabien Thuner | Jenzer Motorsport | 4 | 3 | 4 | 7 | | | 5 | 4 | 7 | 4 | 5 | 6 | 162 |
| 5 | (Switzerland) Zoël Amberg | Jenzer Motorsport | 5 | 5 | 8 | 8 | 8 | 6 | 8 | 5 | 5 | 3 | 7 | Ret | 150 |
| 6 | (Italy) Giacomo Barri | Cram Competition | 8 | 17 | 3 | 6 | 3 | 3 | 17 | Ret | 10 | 9 | 8 | 3 | 128 |
| 7 | (Switzerland) Stefano Comini | CO2 Motorpsort | | | 5 | 2 | 4 | 5 | 6 | 3 | 3 | Ret | 17 | Ret | 126 |
| 8 | (Italy) Alberto Cola | Alko Racing Team | 6 | 16 | 9 | 4 | 5 | 7 | 13 | Ret | 9 | 8 | 4 | 4 | 125 |
| 9 | (Italy) Federico Gibbin | Viola Racing Team | 10 | 9 | 14 | 10 | 7 | 8 | Ret | 9 | 8 | 7 | 3 | 5* | 111 |
| 10 | (Chile) Martin Scuncio | CO2 Motorpsort | 9 | 7 | 12 | 25 | 6 | Ret | 4 | 7 | 22 | 10 | | | 74 |
| 11 | (Italy) Eddie Cheever | Jenzer Motorsport | Ret | 14 | 7 | 23 | 10 | 9 | 7 | Ret | Ret | 13 | Ret | 8 | 53 |
| 12 | (Italy) Francesco Baroni | Emmebi Motorsport | 16 | Ret | 13 | 14 | 12 | 16 | 10 | 8 | Ret | 11 | 9 | 9 | 46 |
| 13 | (Switzerland) Joël Volluz | Daltec Racing | 7 | DNS | 10 | Ret | 14 | Ret | 9 | 15 | 12 | Ret | Ret | 7 | 45 |
| 14 | (Italy) Matteo Davenia | Cram Competition | 11 | 11 | 16 | 12 | 9 | 10 | 15 | 11 | 21 | 14 | 16 | Ret | 36 |
| 15 | (Brazil) André Negrão | Cram Competition | | | | | | | Ret | 10 | 6 | 5 | | | 36 |
| 16 | (Switzerland) Thomas Amweg | Equipe Bernoise | 28 | Ret | 11 | 20 | 11 | 11 | | | 13 | Ret | 11 | 12 | 27 |
| 17 | (Italy) Stefano Carlet | Linerace Technology | 17 | 6 | 27 | 9 | DNS | 13 | | | | | | | 25 |
| 18 | (Switzerland) Antonin Borga | Bossy Racing | 12 | 8 | | | | | | | 11 | 12 | | | 23 |
| 19 | (Italy) Andrea Amici | Team Dueppi/A.Amici(1-6); Cram Competition(7–12) | 14 | 10 | 15 | 15 | 15 | 18 | Ret | Ret | Ret | 21 | 10 | 10 | 23 |
| 20 | (Netherlands) Frank Suntjens | Speedlover | 27 | 12 | 18 | DNS | DSQ | 17 | 11 | 12 | 14 | 16 | Ret | 13 | 18 |
| 21 | (Switzerland) Philipp Witzany | Advance Racing | 21 | 15 | 20 | 11 | Ret | 12 | 14 | 13 | 18 | DNS | | | 15 |
| 22 | (France) Steeve Gerard | SG Racing/S.Gerard | 13 | 19 | Ret | 22 | 18 | 21 | 12 | 16 | Ret | 20 | | | 7 |
| 23 | (Slovenia) Jaka Marinsek | AK Plamtex Sport | 19 | 25 | 23 | 21 | 16 | 20 | Ret | 14 | 16 | 17 | 13 | 15 | 6 |
| 24 | (Portugal) Bernardo Arnaut | CO2 Motorsport | | | | | Ret | 15 | | | | | Ret | 11 | 6 |
| 25 | (Italy) Federico Vecchi | F.Vecchi | | | | | 13 | 14 | | | | | | | 5 |
| 26 | (Switzerland) Kurt Böhlen | Daltec Racing | 18 | 24 | 22 | 16 | 17 | 19 | | | 15 | 18 | 14 | 14 | 5 |
| 27 | (Italy) Antonio Loprieno | Emegie Racing | 15 | 23 | 26 | 13 | | | | | | | | | 4 |
| 28 | (Italy) Luca Marco Spiga | M.Spiga(1–6,11–12); GTR Racing(7–8) | 23 | 21 | 25 | Ret | 19 | 22 | Ret | 19 | | | 12 | 17 | 4 |
| 29 | (Italy) Giovanni Nappi | Team Dueppi | 24 | 13 | Ret | 19 | | | | | | | | | 3 |
| 30 | (Slovenia) Matevz Habjan | AK Plamtex Sport | Ret | DNS | 24 | 24 | | | Ret | 17 | | | 15 | 18 | 1 |
| 31 | (Italy) Christian Mancinelli | Linerace Technology | 22 | 22 | | | | | | | 20 | 15 | Ret | 16 | 1 |
| 32 | (Spain) Marcelo Conchado | Amiter Galuppo Sport | 20 | 18 | | | | | 18 | Ret | | | | | 0 |
| 33 | (Italy) Leonardo Osmieri | L.Osmieri | | | 17 | 17 | Ret | DNS | | | | | | | 0 |
| 34 | (Switzerland) Federico Miccoli | Team Dueppi | 26 | Ret | 21 | 18 | | | | | | | | | 0 |
| 35 | (Belgium) Eddy Roosens | Speed Racing | 25 | DNS | | | | | | | 17 | 19 | | | 0 |
| 36 | (Czech Republic) Jakub Horak | Palmi Motorpsort | 29 | 20 | 19 | DNS | | | | | | | | | 0 |
| 37 | (France) Jerôme Sornicle | Pôle Services | | | | | | | 16 | 18 | | | | | 0 |
| nc | (France) Franck Seemann | Seemann | | | | | | | | | 19 | Ret | | | – |

| Pos | Team | Points |
|---|---|---|
| 1 | (Italy) CO2 Motorsport | 477 |
| 2 | (Switzerland) Jenzer Motorsport | 473 |
| 3 | (Italy) Cram Competition | 210 |
| 4 | (Italy) Alko Racing Team | 180 |
| 5 | (Italy) Viola Racing Team | 167 |
| 6 | (Italy) Emmebi Motorsport | 70 |
| 7 | (Switzerland) Daltec / BMN Böhlen Motorsprot | 51 |
| 8 | (Switzerland) Thomas Amweg / Equipe Bernoise | 43 |
| 9 | (Switzerland) Bossy Racing | 35 |
| 10 | (Netherlands) Speedlover | 28 |
| 11 | (Italy) Linerace Technology | 26 |
| 12 | (Switzerland) Advance Racing | 24 |
| 13 | (Italy) Team Dueppi | 19 |
| 14 | (Slovenia) AK Plamtex Sport | 11 |
| 15 | (Italy) Emmegi Racing | 7 |
| 16 | (Italy) GTR Racing | 6 |
| 17 | (France) SG Racing | 5 |
| nc | (Spain) Amiter Galuppo Sport | 0 |
| nc | (Belgium) Speed Racing | 0 |
| nc | (Czech Republic) Palmimotorsport | 0 |

=== 2009 Formule Renault 2.0 Finland season ===
- Point system : 30, 24, 20, 17, 16, 15, 14, 13, 12, 10, 9, 8, 7, 6, 5, 4, 3, 2, 1. No points for Fastest lap or Pole position.
- Races : 2 or 3 races by rounds, about 20 minutes long each.

| Pos | Driver | Team | (Finland) AHV (1) May 16–17 | | (Sweden) KAR (2) May 22–23 | | (Finland) ALA June 13–14 | | (Finland) BOT August 8–9 | | (Finland) AHV (2) September 5–6 | | Points |
| Pos | Driver | Team | 1 | 2 | 3 | 4 | 5 | 6 | 7 | 8 | 9 | 10 | Points |
|---|---|---|---|---|---|---|---|---|---|---|---|---|---|
| 1 | (Finland) Jukka Honkavuori | Koiranen Bros. Motorsport | 8 | 2 | 4 | DNS | 1* | 8 | 1* | 1 | 4 | 3 | 225 |
| 2 | (Finland) Tomi Limmonen | Koiranen Bros. Motorsport | 3 | 4 | 3 | 6 | 3 | 2 | 2 | 2 | 5 | 6 | 225 |
| 3 | (Finland) Juha-Pekka Wikman | | 5 | 7 | 5 | 2 | 4 | 4 | 8 | 4 | 7 | 8 | 181 |
| 4 | (Finland) Kalle Kulmanen | P1 Motorsport | 4 | 5 | 2 | 3 | Ret | 7 | 3 | 5 | 12 | 12 | 165 |
| 5 | (Estonia) Johannes Moor | RedStep Formula | 6 | 8 | 8 | 7 | 7 | 5 | 4 | 3* | 9 | 9 | 160 |
| 6 | (Estonia) Antti Rammo | Scuderia Nordica | 7 | 10 | 6 | 5 | 5 | 3 | 5 | 6 | 11 | 10 | 159 |
| 7 | (Finland) Henri Karjalainen | RedStep Formula | Ret | 3 | 1 | 1 | 2 | 1* | | | | | 138 |
| 8 | (Estonia) Tõnis Vanaselja | Scuderia Nordica | 9 | 9 | 7 | 4 | 6 | 6 | 7 | 7 | | | 118 |
| | (Finland) Miika Hirsimäki | | | | | | | | 6 | 8 | 10 | 11 | |
| | (Finland) Jesse Krohn | Scuderia Nordica | | | | | | | | | 2 | 4 | |
| | (United Kingdom) Luke Wright | Redstep | | | | | | | | | 13 | 13 | |
The following drivers are not eligible for the final standing
| nc | (Sweden) Felix Rosenqvist | BS Motorsport | 2 | 1* | | | | | | | 3 | 1 | – |
| nc | (Sweden) Daniel Roos | BS Motorsport | 1* | 6 | | | | | | | 1* | 2* | – |
| nc | (United Kingdom) Tom Blomqvist | Trackstar Racing | | | | | | | | | 6 | 5 | – |
| nc | (Finland) Miikka Honkanen | Koiranen Bros. Motorsport | | | | | | | | | 8 | 7 | – |

- (1) = Races held at the same time than the 2009 Formule Renault 2.0 North European Zone season and count for both championship.
- (2) = Races are held with Formula Renault 2.0 Sweden series.

=== 2009 Formula Renault 2.0 Sweden season ===
This is the first season of the series. Point system : 10, 8, 6, 5, 4, 3, 2, 1 for 10th. No points for Fastest lap or Pole position.

Note: This result table is still incomplete.

| Pos | Driver | Team | (Sweden) KAR (1) May 22–23 | | (Sweden) FAL July 10–11 | | (Sweden) KAR August 14–15 | | (Sweden) AND August 22–23 | | (Finland) AHV (1) September 5–6 | | (Sweden) KNU (2) September 10–13 | | | | Points |
| Pos | Driver | Team | 1 | 2 | 3 | 4 | 5 | 6 | 7 | 8 | 9 | 10 | 11 | 12 | 13 | 14 | Points |
|---|---|---|---|---|---|---|---|---|---|---|---|---|---|---|---|---|---|
| 1 | (Sweden) Felix Rosenqvist | Team BS Motorsport | 2* | 2 | | | 1* | 1* | 1 | 3 | 3 | 1 | 1 | 1 | 2 | | 115 |
| 2 | (Sweden) Daniel Roos | Team BS Motorsport | 1 | 1 | | | Ret | 2 | 2 | | 1* | 2* | 2* | 2* | 1* | | 101 |
| 3 | (Sweden) Tom Blomqvist | Trackstar Racing | | | | | 2 | | 1 | | 6 | 5 | | 4 | 3 | | 66 |
| 4 | (Sweden) Kevin Kleveros | Trackstar Racing | 4 | 3 | | | 5 | | | | | | 3 | 3 | 4 | | 51 |
| 5 | (Sweden) Philip Forsman | Koiranen Bros. Motorsport | 5 | 4 | | | 4 | | | | | | 4 | | | | 47 |
| 6 | (Sweden) Christian Kronegård | Trackstar Racing | | | | | 3 | | | | | | 5 | | | | 37 |
| 7 | (Finland) Tomas Heikkinen | Koiranen Bros. Motorsport | | | | | | | | | | | | | | | 20 |
| 8 | (Sweden) Mattias Lindberg | Racing Sweden | | | | | | | | | | | | | | | 17 |
| 9 | (Sweden) Jimmy Eriksson | Motorpark Academy | | | | | | | | | | | | 5 | 5 | | 16 |
| 10 | (Finland) Jesse Krohn | Scuderia Nordica | | | | | | | | | 2 | 4 | | | | | 13 |
| 11 | (Finland) Jukka Honkavuori | Koiranen Bros. Motorsport | P | | | | | | | | 4 | 3 | | | | | 11 |
| 12 | (Finland) Henri Karjalainen | Redstep | 3 | 6 | | | | | | | | | | | | | 9 |
| 13 | (Finland) Tomi Limmonen | Koiranen Bros. Motorsport | | | | | | | | | 5 | 6 | | | | | 9 |
| 14 | (Sweden) Daniel Ivarsson | Team BS Motorsport | | | | | | | | | | | | | | | 7 |
| 15 | (Finland) Juha-Pekka Wikman | | | | | | | | | | 7 | 8 | | | | | 5 |
| 16 | (Netherlands) Kelvin Snoeks | AR Motorsport | | | | | | | | | | | | | | | 5 |
| 17 | (Finland) Kalle Kulmanen | P1 Motorsport | | | | | | | | | 12 | 12 | | | | | 4 |
| 18 | (Denmark) Daniel Schilling | Trackstar Racing | | | | | | | | | | | | | | | 4 |
| 19 | (Sweden) Mikka Honkanen | Koiranen Bros. Motorsport | | | | | | | | | 8 | 7 | | | | | 3 |
| 20 | (Estonia) Antti Rammo | Scuderia Nordica | | | | | | | | | 11 | 10 | | | | | 3 |
| 21 | (Sweden) Alexander Andersson | Alex Motorsport | | | | | | | | | | | | | | | 2 |
| 22 | (Denmark) Kasper Krogh | Racing Sweden | | | | | | | | | | | | | | | 1 |
| nc | (Finland) Mikka Hirsimäki | | | | | | | | | | 10 | 11 | | | | | 0 |
| nc | (Estonia) Johannes Moor | Redstep | | | | | | | | | 9 | 9 | | | | | 0 |
| nc | (Finland) Leopold Ringbom | P1 Motorsport | | | | | | | | | | | | | | | 0 |
| nc | (Estonia) Tõnis Vanaselja | Scuderia Nordica | | | | | | | | | | | | | | | 0 |
| nc | (United Kingdom) Luke Wright | Redstep | | | | | | | | | 13 | 13 | | | | | 0 |

- (1) = Races are held with Formule Renault 2.0 Finland series.
- (2) = Races are held with Formule Renault NEZ series.

=== 2009 Asian Formula Renault Challenge season ===
- Point system : 30, 24, 20, 17, 15, 13, 11, 9, 7, 5, 4, 3, 2, 1 for 14th. No points for Fastest lap or Pole position. Drivers, that start their season at round 5 or later, don't receive any points for the final standing. The team point attribution is different from the driver point system : 10, 8, 6, 5, 4, 3, 2, 1.
- Races : 2 races by rounds.

The Asian Challenge Category (A) reward the best Asian driver.

| Pos | Driver | Team | (China) ZHU March 21–22 | | (China) SHA May 23–24 | | (China) BEI July 11–12 | | (China) SHA August 22–23 | | (China) CHE September 12–13 | | (China) ZHU October 24–25 | | (China) ZHU November 14–15 | | Points | Points (A) |
| Pos | Driver | Team | a | b | 1 | 2 | 3 | 4 | 5 | 6 | 7 | 8 | 9 | 10 | 11 | 12 | Points | Points (A) |
|---|---|---|---|---|---|---|---|---|---|---|---|---|---|---|---|---|---|---|
| 1 | (Israel) Alon Day | March 3 Racing (a-4); Top Speed Racing Team(5–12) | 1* | 1* | 1* | 1 | 2 | 6 | 3 | 2* | 3* | 2* | 1* | 2 | 1 | 2 | 293 | |
| 2 | (Angola) Luis Jorge Sa Silva | Asia Racing Team | | | 4 | 4 | 4 | 4 | 1* | 1 | 1 | 1 | 2 | 1* | 5* | 1 | 287 | |
| 3 | (China) Zhi Qiang Zhang | March 3 Racing | 2 | 2* | 9 | 6 | 3 | 2 | 4 | 5 | 4 | 3 | DNS | 6 | 3 | DNS | 166 | 251 |
| 4 | (France) Benjamin Rouget | Asia Racing Team | | | 3 | 3 | 1* | 1* | 6 | 4 | 2 | 8 | | | | | 163 | |
| 5 | (China) Tengyi Jiang | FRD Racing Team | 3 | 3 | 6 | DNS | 6 | 3 | 2 | 3 | 6 | Ret | 4 | 4 | | | 137 | 204 |
| 6 | (China) Zhi Cong Li | PTRS Team | | | Ret | 10 | 8 | 10 | 9 | 6 | 5 | 5 | 7 | 7 | 4 | 4 | 125 | 214 |
| 7 | (Hong Kong) Luca Ferigutti | Asia Racing Team | 10 | 10 | 12 | 12 | 10 | 9 | 5 | 8 | 8 | 9 | 3 | 3 | 9 | 6 | 118 | |
| 8 | (China) Shan Qi Zhang | PTRS Team | 7 | 7 | 13 | 11 | 7 | 5 | 7 | 7 | | | | | 2 | 3 | 98 | 158 |
| 9 | (Venezuela) Samin Gomez Briceno | March 3 Racing(1–4); Top Speed Racing Team(5–12) | | | 10 | 8 | 11 | 7 | Ret | 10 | Ret | 6 | 6 | 5 | 7 | Ret | 86 | |
| 10 | (China) Xiao Le He | Ghiasports Racing Team | 6 | 4 | | | 5 | Ret | 12 | 9 | 7 | 4 | 12 | 8 | 8 | 7 | 85 | 154 |
| 11 | (Indonesia) Rio Haryanto | Asia Racing Team | | | 2 | 2 | | | | | | | | | | | 48 | 60 |
| 12 | (Finland) Leopold Ringbom | FRD Racing Team(9–10); Champ Motorsport(11–12) | | | | | | | | | | | 5 | Ret | 6 | 5 | 43 | |
| 13 | (Japan) Shohei Shiromoto | Pena Motorsport | | | 7 | 7 | | | 8 | 12 | | | | | | | 34 | 62 |
| 14 | (Hong Kong) Jim Ka To | Champ Motorsport | | | 5 | 5 | | | | | | | | | | | 30 | 48 |
| 15 | (United States) Pete Olson | FRD Racing Team | | | 8 | 9 | Ret | 8 | | | | | | | | | 25 | |
| 16 | (Indonesia) Alexandra Asmasoebrata | Champ Motorsport | | | | | 9 | 12 | | | | | 8 | 10 | | | 24 | 61 |
| 17 | (Hong Kong) Alan Lee | FRD Racing Team | | | | | | | 11 | 11 | Ret | 7 | | | 10 | Ret | 24 | 56 |
| 18 | (Hong Kong) Terence Chan | Champ Motorsport | | | | | | | | | | | | | Ret | 8 | 13 | 30 |
| 19 | (Hong Kong) Paul Lau | Champ Motorsport | | | | | | | | | | | 11 | 9 | | | 11 | 28 |
| 20 | (Singapore) Suriya Bala Kerisnan Thevar | Asia Racing Team | | | 14 | 14 | | | 10 | 13 | | | | | | | 9 | 40 |
| 21 | (Spain) Guille Pintanel Marti | Champ Motorsport | | | | | 12 | 11 | | | | | | | | | 7 | |
| 22 | (Hong Kong) Victor Yung | Champ Motorsport | | | | | | | | | | | 9 | Ret | | | 7 | 17 |
| 23 | (Macau) Joseph Rosa Merszei | Champ Motorsport | | | 11 | 13 | | | | | | | | | | | 6 | 24 |
| 24 | (Chinese Taipei) Jeffrey Lee | PTRS Team | | | | | | | | | | | 10 | Ret | | | 5 | 15 |
| 25 | (Hong Kong) Chin Ka Lok | FRD Racing Team | | | | | Ret | 13 | | | | | | | | | 2 | 13 |
| 26 | (Hong Kong) David Lau | FRD Racing Team | 14 | 11 | | | | | Ret | Ret | | | 13 | Ret | | | 2 | 9 |
| 27 | (Japan) Fujishita Katsuhiro | Gold Wolf GP Team | | | | | | | | | | | DNS | DNS | | | 0 | |
| 28 | (Japan) Wataru Omori | Gold Wolf GP Team | | | | | | | | | | | DNS | DNS | | | 0 | |
| 29 | (Japan) Tsutomu Achiha | Champ Motorsport | | | | | | | | | | | | | Ret | DNS | 0 | 0 |
The following drivers are ineligible to final standing
| – | (Hong Kong) Geoffrey Kwong | Champ Racing Team | 4 | 5 | | | | | | | | | | | | | – | |
| – | (Hong Kong) Michael Choi | Asia Racing Team | 5 | 6 | | | | | | | | | | | | | – | |
| – | (Hong Kong) Samson Chan | Ghiasports Racing Team | 8 | 8 | | | | | | | | | | | | | – | |
| – | (Singapore) Simon Peter Waters | Dyna Ten Motorsports Ltd | 11 | 12 | | | | | | | | | | | | | – | |
| – | (Hong Kong) Kwok Fu Shing | FRD Racing Team | 9 | Ret | | | | | | | | | | | | | – | |
| – | (Hong Kong) Kenneth Lau | Dyna Ten Motorsport Ltd | Ret | 9 | | | | | | | | | | | | | – | |
| – | (Hong Kong) Wong Hon Tat | Asia Racing Team | 13 | 13 | | | | | | | | | | | | | – | |
| – | (Hong Kong) So Yiu Ming | Asia Racing Team | 12 | Ret | | | | | | | | | | | | | – | |

- Rounds a and b indicate pre season races that didn't count toward championship standing.

| Pos | Team | Points | Points (A) |
|---|---|---|---|
| 1 | (China) Asia Racing Team | 116 | 23 |
| 2 | (China) March 3 racing | 62 | 69 |
| 3 | Top Speed Racing | 62 | |
| 4 | (Taiwan) PTRS Team | 60 | 90 |
| 5 | (China) FRD Racing Team | 53 | 70 |
| 6 | (China) Champ Motorsport | 37 | 53 |
| 7 | (China) Ghiasports Racing Team | 30 | 50 |
| 8 | (Philippines) Pena Motorsport | 14 | 18 |
| 9 | (Japan) Gold Wolf GP team | 0 | |

=== 2009 Formula Renault Elf 2.0 Argentina season ===
All cars use Tito 02 chassis.

- Point system : 20, 15, 12, 10, 8, 6, 4, 3, 2, 1 for 10th. 1 point for Pole position. 1 extra point in each race for participating driver.

| Pos | Driver | Team | Points |
|---|---|---|---|
| 1 | (Argentina) Facundo Ardusso | Gabriel Werner Competición | 164 |
| 2 | (Argentina) Francisco Troncoso | GF Racing | 127 |
| 3 | (Argentina) Franco Vivian | FIV Croizet | 95 |
| 4 | (Argentina) Kevin Icardi | Gabriel Werner Competición | 94 |
| 5 | (Argentina) Martín Serrano | GF Racing | 93 |
| 6 | (Argentina) Ayrton Molina | GF Racing | 82 |
| 7 | (Argentina) Rodrigo Rogani | GR Sport Team | 72 |
| 8 | (Argentina) Nicolás Trosset | Gabriel Werner Competición | 70 |
| 9 | (Argentina) Mario Gerbaldo | Werner Junior | 59 |
| 10 | (Argentina) Gustavo Micheloud | JLS Motorsport | 50 |
| 11 | (Argentina) Martín Aimar | Litoral Group | 46 |
| 12 | (Argentina) Antonino García | JLS Motorsport | 43 |
| 13 | (Argentina) Esteban Sarry | Werner Junior | 40 |
| 14 | (Argentina) Franco Girolami | Damiano FB Motorsport | 25 |
| 15 | (Argentina) Roberto Arato | Litoral Group | 23 |
| 16 | (Argentina) Gerardo Salaverría | GF Racing Junior | 21 |
| 17 | (Argentina) Camilo Echevarría | AS Racing | 19 |
| 18 | (Argentina) Agustin Calamari | GF Racing Junior | 9 |
| 19 | (Argentina) Oscar Conta | MW Competición | 18 |
| 20 | (Argentina) Federico Moises | JLS Sport | 18 |
| 21 | (Argentina) Franco Riva | JM Fórmula | 18 |
| 22 | (Argentina) Gianfranco Collino | Litoral Group Fórmula | 18 |
| 23 | (Argentina) Facundo Conta | Werner Junior | 15 |
| 24 | (Argentina) Agustin Giuliani | XP Motorsport | 10 |
| 25 | (Argentina) Octavio Chagas | Litoral Group | 10 |
| 26 | (Argentina) Fernando Barrere | Damiano FB Motorsport | 7 |
| 27 | (Argentina) Germán Sirvent | JLS Motorsport | 6 |
| 28 | (Argentina) Gonzalo Fabi | NQN Racing | 5 |
| 29 | (Argentina) Amadis Farinas | Litoral Group Fórmula | 4 |
| 30 | (Argentina) Alejandro Lanigau | NQN Racing | 3 |
| 31 | (Argentina) Ezequiel Tudesco | NQN Racing | 3 |
| 32 | (Argentina) Estanislao Vilarino | JM Fórmula | 2 |
| 33 | (Argentina) J.F. Cevallo | Croizet Racing | 1 |
| 34 | (Argentina) Nicolas Cáceres | Bouvier Racing | 1 |
| 35 | (Argentina) Gastón Rossi | | 0 |
| 36 | (Argentina) Emanuel Cáceres | | 0 |
| 37 | (Argentina) Juan Cruz Dávila | | 0 |
| 38 | (Argentina) Matías Muñoz Marchese | | 0 |
| 39 | (Argentina) Agustín Alcalde | | 0 |
| 40 | (Ecuador) Miguel Villagomez | | 0 |
| 41 | (Argentina) Agustín Miotti | | 0 |
| 42 | (Argentina) Nicolás Cotignola | | 0 |
| 43 | (Argentina) Nicolás Outeiriño | | 0 |
| 44 | (Argentina) Kevin Toledo | | 0 |
| 45 | (Argentina) Santiago Ghisiglieri | | 0 |
| 46 | (Argentina) Mario Reynoso | | 0 |
| 47 | (Argentina) Juan Benedetti | | 0 |
| 48 | (Argentina) Nicolás Ursprung | | 0 |
| 49 | (Argentina) Christian Tarchini | | 0 |
| 50 | (Argentina) Francisco Viel Bugliotti | | 0 |
| 51 | (Argentina) Franco Bosio | | 0 |

== Other Formulas powered by Renault championships ==
This section includes unofficial and/or Renault-engined formulae.

=== 2009 GP2 Series seasons ===
The GP2 Series and GP2 Asia Series are powered by 4 litre Renault V8 engines and Bridgestone tyres with a Dallara chassis.

=== 2009 Austria Formel Renault Cup season ===
The season is held on 12 rounds in 6 venues in Czech Republic, Germany and Austria. The races occur with other categories cars: Austrian Formula 3, Formelfrei and Formula 3,5L like (Renault 3,5L from Words Series, Lola Cosworth). This section present only the Austrian Formula Renault 2.0L classification.

Standing only after round 3/5:

| Pos | Driver | Team | (Germany) Hockenheim April 25–26 | | (Germany) Lausitz May 16–17 | | (Germany) Hockenheim July 25–26 | | (Czech Republic) Pannonia September 5–6 | | (Austria) Salzburg October 4–5 | | Points |
| Pos | Driver | Team | 1 | 2 | 3 | 4 | 5 | 6 | 7 | 8 | 9 | 10 | Points |
|---|---|---|---|---|---|---|---|---|---|---|---|---|---|
| 1 | (Estonia) Tõnis Vanaselja | Team Scuderia Nordica | 1 | 1 | | | | | 4 | 3 | 2 | 1* | 87 |
| 2 | (France) Gregory Striebig | Striebig | 4 | 2 | 3 | 1 | | | | | 3 | 4 | 73 |
| 3 | (France) Remy Striebig | Striebig | 3 | 4 | 4 | 2 | | | | | 4 | 3 | 58 |
| 4 | (Germany) Kai Boller | | 2 | 3 | | | | | | | | | 29 |
| 5 | (Switzerland) Urs Maier | | | | 2 | 6 | | | 7 | Ret | | | 26 |
| 6 | (Czech Republic) Jaka Marinsek | AK Plamtex Sport | | | | | | | 5 | Ret | 1* | 2 | 24 |
| 7 | (Estonia) Toomas Annus | Team Scuderia Nordica | | | | | | | | | 6 | 6 | 20 |
| 8 | (Austria) Johann Ledermair | | | | | | | | 1 | 2 | | | 18 |
| 9 | (Czech Republic) David Palmi | Ivo Palmi | | | | | | | 3 | 1 | | | 16 |
| 10 | (Austria) Michael Plassnig | Top Speed | 6 | 6 | 1* | Ret* | | | | | | | 10 |
| 11 | (Czech Republic) Jakub Horak | Ivo Palmi | | | | | | | 2 | DNS | | | 8 |
| 12 | (Estonia) Marek Kiisa | | | | | | | | | | | | 8 |
| 13 | (Austria) Gerhard Hille | | | | | | | | 6 | 4 | | | 8 |
| 14 | (France) Philipp Leclere | Leclere | | | | | | | | | 7 | 7 | 6 |
| 15 | (France) Rémi Kirchdöffer | Kirchdöffer | | | | | | | | | 5 | 5 | 6 |
| 16 | (Germany) Hartmut Bertsch | Conrad Racing Sport | 5 | 7 | 5 | 3 | | | 8 | DNS | | | 6 |
| 17 | (Austria) Stefan Miller | Top Speed | 7 | 8 | | | | | | | | | 5 |
| 18 | (Austria) Norbert Gruber | Top Speed | | | 8 | DNS | | | | | | | 5 |
| 19 | (Germany) Helmut Rokitta | | | | 6 | 4 | | | | | | | 5 |
| 20 | (Estonia) Antti Rammo | Team Scuderia Nordica | 8* | 5* | | | | | | | | | 4 |
| 21 | (Germany) Thomas Fleischmann | Team Randlshofer | | | 7 | 5 | | | 9 | 8 | | | 3 |

=== 2009 Formule Renault 2.0 North European Zone season ===
- Point system : 25, 20, 16, 14, 12, 10, 8, 6, 4, 3, 2, 1 for 12th for rounds 1 to 4. 25, 20, 16, 14, 12, 10, 8, 6, 4 and 2 for 10th for rounds 5 and 6. 25, 20, 16, 13, 11, 9, 8, 7, 6, 5, 4, 3, 2, 1 for 15th for rounds 7 to 10. Also 1 point for Fastest lap and for Pole position.

| Pos | Driver | Team | (Finland) Ahvenisto (1) May 16–17 | | (Estonia) Pärnu June 27–28 | | (Sweden) Falkenbergs (2) July 11–12 | | (Sweden) Knutstorp (2) September 10–13 | | | | Points (3) |
| Pos | Driver | Team | 1 | 2 | 3 | 4 | 5 | 6 | 7 | 8 | 9 | 10 | Points (3) |
|---|---|---|---|---|---|---|---|---|---|---|---|---|---|
| 1 | (Sweden) Felix Rosenqvist | BS Motorsport | 2 | 1* | 2 | 2 | 3 | 4 | 1 | 1 | 2 | 2 | 193 |
| 2 | (Sweden) Daniel Roos | BS Motorsport | 1* | 6 | 1* | 1* | 7 | 8 | 2* | 2* | 1* | 1* | 192 |
| 3 | (New Zealand) Tom Blomqvist | Trackstar Racing | | | | | 5 | 3 | 6 | 4 | 3 | 5 | 78 |
| 4 | (Sweden) Kevin Kleveros | Trackstar Racing | | | | | 4 | 5 | 3 | 3 | 4 | 11 | 51 |
| 5 | (Sweden) Philip Forsman | Koiranen Bros. Motorsport | | | | | 2 | 2 | 4 | 6 | ? | 4 | 76 |
| 6 | (Estonia) Antti Rammo | Scuderia Nordica | 7 | 10 | 4 | 4 | | | 9 | 7 | 8 | 12 | 67 |
| 7 | (Estonia) Tõnis Vanaselja | Scuderia Nordica | 9 | 9 | 5 | 3 | | | 10 | 10 | 9 | 10 | 61 |
| 8 | (Finland) Toomas Heikkinen | Koiranen Bros. Motorsport | | | | | 1* | 1* | | | | | 53 |
| 9 | (Sweden) Christian Kronegård | Trackstar Racing | | | | | 6 | 6 | 5 | ? | 6 | 6 | 51 |
| 10 | (Sweden) Jimmy Eriksson | Motopark Academy | | | | | | | 7 | 5 | 5 | 3 | 47 |
| 11 | (Sweden) Mattias Lindberg | Racing Sweden | | | | | 9 | 7 | 11 | 8 | 7 | 7 | 43 |
| 12 | (Finland) Tomi Limmonen | Koiranen Bros. Motorsport | 3 | 4 | | | | | | | | | 30 |
| 13 | (Finland) Jukka Honkavuori | Koiranen Bros. Motorsport | 8 | 2 | | | | | | | | | 27 |
| 14 | (Finland) Kalle Kulmanen | P1 Motorsport | 4 | 5 | | | | | | | | | 26 |
| 15 | (Sweden) Daniel Ivarsson | BS Motorsport | | | | | | | 8 | 9 | ? | 8 | 23 |
| 16 | (Estonia) Erko Vallbaum | MKE Motorpsort | | | 6 | 5 | | | | | | | 22 |
| 17 | (Finland) Leopold Ringbom | P1 Motorsport | | | | | | | 12 | 11 | 10 | 9 | 21 |
| 18 | (Finland) Juha-Pekka Wikman | | 5 | 7 | | | | | | | | | 20 |
| 19 | (Denmark) Daniel Schilling | Trackstar Racing | | | | | 10 | 9 | 13 | 13 | 11 | ? | 17 |
| 20 | (Estonia) Johannes Moor | RedStep Formula | 6 | 8 | | | | | | | | | 16 |
| 21 | (Finland) Henri Karjalainen | RedStep Formula | Ret | 3 | | | | | | | | | 16 |
| 22 | (Finland) Miika Honkanen | | | | 3 | Ret | | | | | | | 16 |
| 23 | (Sweden) Alexander Andersson | Alex Motorsport | | | | | 11 | 11 | ? | 12 | 12 | 13 | 11 |
| 24 | (Denmark) Kasper Krogh | Racing Sweden | | | | | 8 | 10 | | | | | 8 |

- (1) = Races are held at the same time than the 2009 Formula Renault 2.0 Finland season and count for both championship.
- (2) = Races are held at the same time than the Formula Renault 2.0 Sweden season and count for both championship.
- (3) = The final standing include only the best 9 results of the season.

=== 2009 Formula 2000 Light season ===
This is the second season of the Formula 2000 Light held in Italy. The series use Tatuus Formula Renault or Dallara Formula 3 chassis with 2000 cc maximum engines and Michelin tyres.

- Point system : 32, 28, 24, 22, 20, 18, 16, 14, 12, 10, 8, 6, 4, 2, 1 for 15th. In each race 2 point for Fastest lap and 3 for Pole position.
- Races : 2 races by rounds.

The championship reward several sub categories :

- Over 35 : for drivers older than 35 years old (+).
- Under 17 : for drivers younger than 17 years old (−).
- Formula 3 : for drivers using Formula 3 chassis (F3).
- Team : for racing team involved in all venues.

The rounds a and b held on Magione, March 7–8 are the opening venue doesn't reward points.

| Pos | Driver | Team | (Italy) Magione March 7–8 | | (Italy) Magione April 25–26 | | (Italy) Misano May 23–24 | | (Italy) Magione July 4–5 | | (Italy) Varano August 1–2 | | (Italy) Adria September 12–13 | | (Italy) Misano October 24–25 | | Points |
| Pos | Driver | Team | a | b | 1 | 2 | 3 | 4 | 5 | 6 | 7 | 8 | 9 | 10 | 11 | 12 | Points |
|---|---|---|---|---|---|---|---|---|---|---|---|---|---|---|---|---|---|
| 1 | (Italy) Pierluigi Veronesi (F3) | System Team | | | 1 | 8 | 2* | 1* | 1 | 3* | Ret | 1* | 1* | 20 | 1* | 1 | 322 |
| 2 | (Germany) Thiemo Storz | CO2 Motorsport | Ret | 3 | 3* | 3 | 1 | 3 | 2 | 1 | 1 | 2 | 3 | 2 | Ret | Ret | 278 |
| 3 | (Italy) Claudio Castiglioni | CO2 Motorsport | Ret | nc | 6 | 2 | 12 | 9 | 6 | 6 | 8 | 4 | 9 | 10 | 6 | 8 | 190 |
| 4 | (Italy) Davide Amaduzzi (+)(FG) | Gloria Pro Team | | | 2 | 1 | 3 | 2 | Ret | Ret | 3 | 17 | 19 | DNS | 3 | 3 | 186 |
| 5 | (Belgium) Ludwig Ghidi (−) | GC Sport Auto | | | 4 | 11 | 10 | 10 | 5 | 4 | 6 | 7 | 6 | 4 | | | 166 |
| 6 | (Chile) Martin Scuncio | CO2 Motorsport | | | 5 | 12* | 4 | 12 | 4 | 2 | 5 | Ret | | | | | 126 |
| 7 | (Italy) Oscar Bana | MG Motorsport | | | 7 | 5 | Ret | 6 | Ret | Ret | 7 | 8 | 7 | 6 | Ret | 14 | 120 |
| 8 | (Italy) Leonardo Osmieri (−) | Team Dueppi | Ret | 10 | Ret | Ret | 14 | 16 | Ret | Ret | 2 | 3 | Ret | 3 | 8 | 7 | 108 |
| 9 | (Italy) Kevin D'Amico (−) | TJ Emme | | | 12 | 10 | 13 | 14 | 7 | 8 | 9 | 13 | Ret | 7 | 20 | 10 | 94 |
| 10 | (Italy) Luca Mingotti (+) | AP Motorsport | | | | | 9 | 8 | 14 | 7 | Ret | 5 | 8 | 8 | | | 92 |
| 11 | (Italy) Alberto Moretti (+) | TJ Emme | DNS | DNS | 17 | 9 | | | 11 | 10 | 10 | Ret | Ret | 5 | 11 | 15 | 77 |
| 12 | (Italy) Matteo Manzo | Dynamic | 4 | 7 | DNS | DNS | 11 | 11 | Ret | 5 | 19 | 6 | 18 | 13 | 12 | 9 | 76 |
| 13 | (Italy) Federic Vecchi | Team Dueppi(3–10);COG Sport Auto(11–12) | | | | | 5 | 5 | | | | | 12 | 21 | Ret | 2 | 74 |
| 14 | (Italy) Mirko Barletta | Diegi Motorsport | | | 8 | 4 | 6 | 13 | Ret | Ret | 17 | 10 | | | | | 68 |
| 15 | (Italy) Stefano Turchetto | Diegi Motorpsort | | | | | | | | | | | 4 | 19 | 5 | 4 | 64 |
| 16 | (Italy) Giulio Glorioso (FG) | Gloria Pro Team | | | | | | | | | | | 2 | Ret | 2 | 20* | 56 |
| 17 | (Italy) Dino Lusuardi (F3) | System Team | | | | | 16 | DNS | 3* | Ret | DNS | 11 | 5 | DNS | | | 54 |
| 18 | (Italy) Laura Polidori (w) | LP Formula | 3 | 9 | 11 | 13 | 15 | Ret | 8 | 12 | Ret | 14 | 11 | 12 | 13 | 16 | 53 |
| 19 | (Italy) Vicky Piria (−) (w) | Tomcat Racing | | | | | | | | | 13 | 9 | 10 | 15 | 10 | 11 | 43 |
| 20 | (France) Roman Vozniak (−) | Facondini Racing | Ret | 1* | | | | | | | | | | | 4 | 6 | 40 |
| 21 | (Italy) Mamo Vuolo (+) | Dynamic(1–6);AP Motorsport(7-) | 6 | 12 | Ret | 7 | | | 10 | 13 | 11 | 15 | | | | | 39 |
| 22 | (Italy) Mario Bertolotti | TJ Emme | | | | | 8 | 4 | | | | | | | | | 36 |
| 23 | (Italy) Matteo Davenia | CO2 Motorpsort | | | | | | | | | | | | | 7 | 5 | 36 |
| 24 | (Italy) Paolo Coppi (F3) | Alan Racing | | | | | | | | | 4 | Ret | 16 | 9 | | | 34 |
| 25 | (Italy) Mauro Brozzi (F3) | Bellspeed | | | Ret | DNS | | | | | | | DSQ | 1* | | | 34 |
| 26 | (Italy) Mattia Brugiotti (−) | Tomcat Racing | | | | | 7 | 7 | | | | | | | | | 32 |
| 27 | (Italy) Paolo Viero (+) | AP Mortorsport | | | Ret | 6 | Ret | 22 | | | 16 | 12 | Ret | 11 | 17 | 19 | 32 |
| 28 | (Italy) Domenico Dardo (+) | Team Dueppi(1–6,11–12);Dynamic(9–10) | | | 15 | 16 | | | 9 | 11 | | | 17 | 17 | 18 | Ret | 21 |
| 29 | (Italy) Federico Del Rosso (F3) | Cherubini Racing | | | | | | | 12 | 9 | | | | | | | 18 |
| 30 | (Italy) Francesco Baroni | Emmebi Motorsport | | | | | | | | | | | | | 9 | 12 | 18 |
| 31 | (Italy) Davide Pigozzi (+) | Tomcat Racing | | | 14 | 14 | 17 | 15 | 13 | 14 | 15 | 16 | 14 | 14 | 16 | 18 | 17 |
| 32 | (Italy) Giorgio Ferri (+) | Keks | | | 9 | Ret | | | | | | | | | | | 12 |
| 33 | (Italy) Giampiero Negrotti (F3) | System Team | | | 10 | 17 | 23 | 20 | | | | | | | 19 | 17 | 10 |
| 34 | (Italy) Joseph Feffer Zeca | Diegi Motorsport | | | | | | | | | 13 | 18 | 15 | 18 | 14 | Ret | 7 |
| 35 | (Italy) Davide Mangeri | Sarchio Racing | | | | | | | | | 12 | 19 | | | | | 6 |
| 36 | (Italy) Flavio Mattara (+) | Yellow Racing Group | | | 16 | Ret | 18 | 17 | Ret | Ret | | | 13 | 16 | | | 6 |
| 37 | (Czech Republic) Jaka Marinsek (−) | Plamtex | | | 13 | 15 | | | | | | | | | | | 5 |
| 38 | (Brazil) Francisco Weiler | Team Dueppì | | | | | | | | | | | | | 15 | 13 | 4 |
| 39 | (Italy) Massimo Rossi (+) | Line Race | | | | | 21 | 18 | | | | | | | | | 0 |
| 40 | (Italy) Federico Porri (+) | KeKS Motorsport | | | | | 19 | 19 | | | | | | | | | 0 |
| 41 | (Italy) Marco Roccadelli (+) | Team Dueppi | | | | | 20 | 21 | | | | | | | | | 0 |
| 42 | (Italy) Rossano Sciabbarrasi (+) | Line Race | | | | | 22 | 23 | | | | | | | | | 0 |
| 43 | (Italy) Federico Glorioso (FG) | Gloria Pro Team | | | | | Ret | Ret | | | | | | | | | 0 |
| 44 | (Italy) Salvatore Cardullo | Cherubini Racing | | | | | | | | | 18 | DNS | | | | | 0 |
The following drivers are not eligible to final standing
| – | (Italy) Giovanni Venturini | CO2 Motorsport | 1* | 2 | | | | | | | | | | | | | – |
| – | (Italy) Matteo Cressoni | Tomcat Racing | 2 | 5 | | | | | | | | | | | | | – |
| – | (Slovakia) Nikolas Kvasai (−) | Facondini Racing | 5 | 8 | | | | | | | | | | | | | – |
| – | (Italy) Angelo Baiguera | Brixia Motorsport | 7 | 11 | | | | | | | | | | | | | – |
| – | (Italy) Andrea Galluzzi | Benvissuto Racing | 8 | 13 | | | | | | | | | | | | | – |
| – | (Italy) Stefano Carlet | Line Race | Ret | 4 | | | | | | | | | | | | | – |
| – | (Portugal) Bernardo Arnaut (−) | CO2 Motorsport | Ret | 6 | | | | | | | | | | | | | – |

- (−) = Indicate drivers younger than 17 years old.
- (+) = Indicate drivers older than 35 years old.
- (F3) = Indicate drivers using Dallara Formula 3 chassis with Opel or Fiat engine.
- (FG)= Formula Gloria
- (w) = indicate women drivers

==== 2009 Formula 2000 Light Winter Trophy ====
- Point system: 32, 28, 24, 22, 20, 18, 16, 14, 12, 10, 8, 6, 4, 2, 1 for 15th. Also 3 points for pole position and 2 for fasted lap.

| Pos | Driver | Team | (Italy) Adria November 7–8 | | Points |
| Pos | Driver | Team | 1 | 2 | Points |
|---|---|---|---|---|---|
| 1 | (Brazil) Francisco Weiler | Team Dueppi | 1 | 3 | 56 |
| 2 | (Costa Rica) André Solano | Facondini Motorsport | 4 | 2 | 50 |
| 3 | (Italy) Edoardo Bacci (−) | Tomcat Racing | 9* | 1* | 48 |
| 4 | (Mexico) David Farias | Facondini Motorsport | 2 | 12† | 43 |
| 5 | (Italy) Leonardo Osmieri (−) | Team Dueppi | 3 | 8† | 38 |
| 6 | (Italy) Matteo Torta | Line Race | 7 | 5 | 36 |
| 7 | (Puerto Rico) Ricardo Vera (−) | Facondini Motorsport | 5 | 10† | 28 |
| 8 | (Italy) A. Galluzzi | Benvissuto Racing | 10 | 6 | 28 |
| 9 | (United Kingdom) Vittoria Piria (−) | Tomcat Racing | 12† | 4 | 28 |
| 10 | (Italy) S. Patrinicola (−) | Team Torino | 6 | 9† | 24 |
| 11 | (Mexico) Juan Carlos Sistos | Facondini Motorsport | 8 | 11† | 24 |
| 12 | (Brazil) Joseph Fefer Zeca | Diegi Motorsport | 11† | 7† | 24 |

† = Did not finish but classified for standing

=== 2009 LATAM Challenge Series season ===
This is the second season of the Latin American (LATAM) Challenge Series held mainly Mexico. The series use Tatuus Formula Renault 2.0L F4RS engines and Kumho tyres.

- Point system : 30, 24, 20, 16, 12, 10, 8, 6, 4, 2 for 10th. 2 Points for fastest lap and no points for pole position.

Freddy Zebede from the team Team Costa Rica/Uno Express Racing/PartyPokerRacing is crowned Rookie of the season.

| Pos | Driver | Team | (Mexico) Amozoc March 21–22 | | (Mexico) Querétaro April 25–26 | | (Mexico) Amozoc May 23–24 | | (Mexico) Guadalajara June 20–21 | | (Mexico) Chihuahua August 1–2 | | (Mexico) Monterrey September 12–13 | | (Mexico) San Luis Potosí October 3–4 | | (Costa Rica) Alajuela November 27–29 | | | | Points |
| Pos | Driver | Team | 1 | 2 | 3 | 4 | 5 | 6 | 7 | 8 | 9 | 10 | 11 | 12 | 13 | 14 | 15 | 16 | 17 | 18 | Points |
|---|---|---|---|---|---|---|---|---|---|---|---|---|---|---|---|---|---|---|---|---|---|
| 1 | (Costa Rica) André Solano | Unico Costa Rica Racing Team | Ret | 2 | Ret | 4 | 1 | 11* | 7 | 1 | 9 | 1 | 2 | 3 | 4 | 1 | 2 | 3 | 1 | 5 | 324 |
| 2 | (Venezuela) Giancarlo Serenelli | Re Racing | 1 | 1 | Ret | 13 | 2 | Ret | 6 | 2 | 3 | 5* | 10 | Ret | 2* | 2 | 1* | 2 | 5 | 1* | 318 |
| 3 | (Mexico) Gerardo Nieto | Re Racing | Ret | 10 | 10 | Ret | 11 | 7 | 1* | 5 | 1 | 6 | 1* | 1* | 1 | 3* | 4 | 1* | 9 | 4 | 284 |
| 4 | (Mexico) David Farias | Team Costa Rica RDT | 3 | 3 | 1* | DNS | 5 | 4 | 2 | 12 | 2* | 12 | 3 | 6 | 3 | Ret | 5 | 4 | 3 | 3 | 270 |
| 5 | (Mexico) Enrique Baca | Mega Racing | 4 | 6 | 5 | 16 | 6 | 1 | 3 | 3 | 13 | 3 | 7 | 2 | Ret | 7 | | | | | 178 |
| 6 | (Panama) Freddy Zebede | Team Costa Rica RDT | | | 6 | 3 | 8 | 3 | Ret | 11 | 4 | 2 | | | | | DNS | 7 | 4 | 6 | 130 |
| 7 | (Mexico) David Arrayales | Maga Racing | 6 | Ret | 4 | 1 | 4 | 2 | 9 | 10 | | | 6 | 9 | Ret | 11 | | | | | 116 |
| 8 | (Puerto Rico) Ricardo Vera | Team Costa Rica RDT | 17 | 15 | 11 | 9 | 16 | 6 | 11 | 8 | 8 | 9 | 9 | 4 | 7 | 8 | 10 | 5 | 2 | 7 | 112 |
| 9 | (Colombia) Juan Piedrahita | Re Racing | 14 | Ret | 12 | 10 | 13 | 5 | 4 | 7* | 10 | 8 | Ret | Ret | 8 | 10 | 3 | Ret | 7 | 2 | 108 |
| 10 | (Mexico) Martin Fuentes | Re Racing | 2 | 13 | 7 | 8 | 10 | 9 | Ret | Ret | 6 | 10 | 12 | 5 | 6 | 9 | 9 | 6 | 6 | 16 | 104 |
| 11 | (Mexico) Carlos Arellano | Unico Costa Rica Racing Team | | | 8 | 6 | 7 | 8 | 5 | 4 | 7 | 4 | Ret | Ret | 5 | 6 | DNS | DNS | | | 104 |
| 12 | (Mexico) Rudy Camarillo | Team CSM | 11 | 12 | 2 | 5 | | | | | 5 | Ret | 4 | Ret | 11 | 5 | | | | | 76 |
| 13 | (Mexico) Rodrigo Peralta | Maga Racing | Ret | 7 | 3 | 2 | 17 | Ret | Ret | Ret | | | | | | | | | | | 52 |
| 14 | (Colombia) Francisco Diaz | Unico Costa Rica Racing Team | 16 | 17 | 9 | 7 | 14 | Ret | 8 | 9 | 12 | 13 | 11 | Ret | 9 | 4 | DNS | Ret | | | 44 |
| 15 | (Mexico) Santiago Tovar | Ram Racing | 12 | 11 | Ret | 15 | 12 | Ret | Ret | 6 | Ret | 7 | 5 | Ret | | | | | | | 30 |
| 16 | (Guatemala) Ricardo Marroquin | Ram Racing | 10 | Ret | | | | | | | 11 | 14 | | | | | 6 | 8 | 8 | 10 | 26 |
| 17 | (Guatemala) Roberto Dalton | Team Costa Rica RDT | 8 | 4 | 14 | 12 | 9 | Ret | | | | | | | | | | | | | 26 |
| 18 | (Mexico) Jose Carlos Sandoval | Re Racing | 5 | 5 | | | | | | | | | | | | | | | | | 24 |
| 19 | (Mexico) Oscar P. Arroyo | Re Racing | 15 | Ret | 13 | 11 | 15 | 10 | 10 | 13 | 11 | 11 | 8 | 8 | 10 | 12 | 8 | Ret | 14 | 13 | 24 |
| 20 | (Mexico) Homero Richards | Dynamic Motorsport | | | | | 3* | Ret | | | | | | | | | | | | | 22 |
| 21 | (Mexico) Hugo Oliveras | Unico Costa Rica Racing Team | 7 | 8 | Ret | 14 | | | | | | | | | | | | | | | 14 |
| 22 | (Costa Rica) James Adams | Unico Costa Rica Racing Team | | | | | | | | | | | | | 12 | Ret | 7 | 9 | 17 | Ret | 12 |
| 23 | (Colombia) Juan Manuel González | Unico Costa Rica Racing Team | 9 | 9 | | | | | | | | | | | | | | | | | 8 |
| 24 | (Mexico) Michael Dörrbecker | Team Costa Rica RTD | | | | | | | | | | | Ret | 7 | | | | | | | 8 |
| 25 | (Costa Rica) Juan Ignacio Pérez | | | | | | | | | | | | | | | | DNS | Ret | 10 | 8 | 8 |
| 26 | (Costa Rica) Alex Delisser | | | | | | | | | | | | | | | | DNS | Ret | 13 | 9 | 4 |
| 27 | (Costa Rica) Marco Castro | | | | | | | | | | | | | | | | DNS | Ret | 12 | 11 | 2 |
| 28 | (Costa Rica) Daniel Formal | | | | | | | | | | | | | | | | | | Ret | DNS | 0 |
| 29 | (Colombia) Estevan Yanguas | Unico Costa Rica Racing Team | Ret | 14 | Ret | DNS | | | | | | | | | | | | | | | 0 |
| 30 | (Costa Rica) Felipe Vargas | | | | | | | | | | | | | | | | DNS | Ret | 16 | 12 | 0 |
| 31 | (Costa Rica) Francisco Chamberlain | | | | | | | | | | | | | | | | DNS | Ret | 15 | DNS | 0 |
| 32 | (Mexico) José Antonio Ramos | | | | | | | | | | | | | | | | | | Ret | Ret | 0 |
| 33 | (Costa Rica) José Hernandez | | | | | | | | | | | | | | | | | | 11 | 15 | 0 |
| 34 | (Colombia) Juan Villamil | Unico Costa Rica Racing Team | 13 | 16 | Ret | Ret | | | | | | | | | | | | | | | 0 |
| 35 | (Costa Rica) Jean Valerio | | | | | | | | | | | | | | | | DNS | Ret | 18 | 14 | 0 |

=== 2009 Super Fórmula 2.0 Brasil season ===
- Point system : 30, 24, 20, 16, 12, 10, 8, 6, 4, 2 for 10th. Extra 1 point for Fastest lap and 1 point for Pole position.

The season include 10 races but the lack of participants force to cancel the series as it was the past year.

| Pos | Driver | Team | (Brazil) Interlagos March 8 | (Brazil) Interlagos May 31 | Points |
| Pos | Driver | Team | 1 | 2 | Points |
|---|---|---|---|---|---|
| 1 | (Brazil) Victor Guerin | Dragão Motorsport | 2 | 2 | 48 |
| 2 | (Brazil) Nuno Lázaro | LRTeam | 3 | 3 | 40 |
| 3 | (Brazil) Nathan Silva | G-Force Engineering | 1* | | 32 |
| 3 | (Brazil) Leandro Florenzo | G-Force Engineering | | 1* | 32 |
| 5 | (Brazil) Oswaldo Fragnani Jr. | Fragnani Motorsport | 4 | | 16 |
| 6 | (Brazil) Jorge Roselli | Driver Team | 5 | | 12 |
| nc | (Brazil) Sara Sanchez | | Ret | | 0 |
| nc | (Brazil) Guga Campedelli | G-Force Engineering | | Ret | 0 |
| nc | (Brazil) Willian Freire | Capital Motorsport | | Ret | 0 |

=== 2009 Fórmula Renault Plus season ===
The series is held partially on the same rounds than its secondary series Fórmula Renault Interprovencial. It use Crespi chassis.

- Point system : 20, 15, 12, 10, 8, 6, 4, 3, 2, 1 for 10th. Extra 1 point for Pole position. All drivers receive 1 point for take part of the qualifying session.

The calendar include 10 rounds:

1. Autódromo Roberto Mouras (February 15)
2. Autódromo Ciudad De Río Cuarto (March 15)
3. Autódromo Termas de Río Hondo (March 29)
4. Las Paredes (May 26)
5. Autódromo Ciudad de Concordia (May 17)
6. Marcos Juárez Motor Club Circuit (June 7)
7. Autódromo Oscar Cabalén, Cordoba (July 12)
9. Marcos Juárez Motor Club Circuit (September 13)
10. Autódromo San Jorge (October 18)
11. Autódromo Ciudad De Río Cuarto (November 8)

| Pos | Driver | Team | Points |
|---|---|---|---|
| 1 | (Argentina) Alan Castellano | Fauro Sport | 156 |
| 2 | (Argentina) Alfredo Martini | Baypel Scuderia | 119 |
| 3 | (Argentina) Julián Santero | Castro Raicing | 113 |
| 4 | (Argentina) Ever Franetovich | Barovero Team | 72 |
| 5 | (Argentina) Matias Cantarini | Cantarini | 71 |
| 6 | (Argentina) Mario Valle | Croizet Competicion | 60 |
| 7 | (Argentina) Franco Bosio | Litoral Grup | 56 |
| 8 | (Argentina) Andres Barovero | Baypel Scuderia | 42 |
| 9 | (Argentina) Roberto Arato | Litoral Grup | 38 |
| 10 | (Argentina) Pablo Teres | Bodeguita Raicing | 27 |
| 11 | (Argentina) Amadis Farina | Litoral Grup | 27 |
| 12 | (Argentina) Wilson Borgino | Borgino Conpeticion | 25 |
| 13 | (Argentina) Julia Ballario | Baypel Scuderia | 23 |
| 14 | (Argentina) Juan M. Basco | | 21 |
| 15 | (Argentina) Joel Gassman | Litoral Grup | 17 |
| 16 | (Argentina) Federico Moises | | 17 |
| 17 | (Argentina) Maximiliano Vivot | | 12 |
| 18 | (Argentina) Diego La Raya | Mercado Raicing | 12 |
| 19 | (Argentina) Ignacio Procacitto | Castro Raicing, Fauro Sport | 11 |
| 20 | (Argentina) Raúl Gorordo | | 11 |
| 21 | (Argentina) Vicente Ripani | Ripani Competicion | 9 |
| 22 | (Argentina) Juan Manuel Cabalen | JLS Motorpsort | 8 |
| 23 | (Argentina) Víctor Rosso | JLS Motorpsort | 7 |
| 24 | (Argentina) Danilo D'Angelo | D'Angelo Grup | 6 |
| 25 | (Argentina) Franco Girolami | Ramini | 4 |
| 26 | (Argentina) Sebastian Gurrieri | | 3 |
| 27 | (Argentina) Facundo Chapur | | 3 |
| 28 | (Argentina) Fabian Mele | Litoral Grup | 2 |
| 29 | (Argentina) Bruno Etman | | 2 |
| 30 | (Argentina) Juan Cruz Ferrero | | 1 |
| 31 | (Argentina) Dario Elisei | Castro Competicion | 1 |
| 32 | (Argentina) Carlos Host | Mercado Competicion | 1 |
| 33 | (Argentina) Juan Barruca | | 1 |
| 34 | (Argentina) Andres Reginatto | | 1 |
| 35 | (Argentina) Hernan Costa | | 1 |
| nc | (Argentina) Andres Cief | | 0 |

=== 2009 Fórmula Renault Interprovencial season ===
The series is held in the same rounds than its main series Fórmula Renault Plus.

- Point system : 20, 15, 12, 10, 8, 6, 4, 3, 2, 1 for 10th. Extra 1 point for Pole position. All drivers receive 1 point for take part of the qualifying session.

1. Autódromo Ciudad De Río Cuarto (March 15)
2. Autódromo Oscar Cabalén (May 3)
3. Marcos Juárez Motor Club Circuit (June 7)
4–5. Autódromo Oscar Cabalén (July 11–12)
6. Autódromo Ciudad De Río Cuarto (August 23)
7. Autódromo Oscar Cabalén (September 13)
8. Autódromo Ciudad De Río Cuarto (October 11)
9. Autódromo Oscar Cabalén (November 15)

| Pos | Driver | Team | Points |
|---|---|---|---|
| 1 | (Argentina) Darío Elisei | Castro Competicion | 171 |
| 2 | (Argentina) Maximiliano Terzoni | Mandrini Competicion | 141 |
| 3 | (Argentina) Juan Jose Gabarra | Cantarini Competicion | 123 |
| 4 | (Argentina) Federico Pancello | AUGS | 101 |
| 5 | (Argentina) Daniel Gabarra | Cantarini Competicion | 76 |
| 6 | (Argentina) María José Lorenzatti | AUGS | 73 |
| 7 | (Argentina) Ramiro Marinucci | Marinucci Competicion | 63 |
| 8 | (Argentina) Germán Monney | Monney Competicion | 53 |
| 9 | (Argentina) Andrés Cief | Mandrini Competicion | 38 |
| 10 | (Argentina) Matias Cantarini | Cantarini Competicion | 37 |
| 11 | (Argentina) Adrían Alfango | Ramini Competicion | 35 |
| 12 | (Argentina) Alejandro Ruani | Mandrini Competicion | 26 |
| 13 | (Argentina) Agustin Piconi | Cantarini Competicion | 16 |
| 14 | (Argentina) José Luis Domesi | Fauro Sport | 6 |
| 15 | (Argentina) Fernando Bodritto | YIYO Competicion | 3 |
| 16 | (Argentina) Martinez | Pergamino Racing | 3 |
| 17 | (Argentina) Juan Pablo Cravero | | 2 |
| 18 | (Argentina) Matias Reimondi | | 1 |
| 19 | (Argentina) Juan C. Micheli | | 1 |
| 20 | (Argentina) Fabian Mele | | 1 |

=== 2009 Fórmula Metropolitana season ===
This is the second season of the Fórmula 4 Metropolitana series held on Argentina. Cars use Renault Clio K4M engine (1598cc) with low power than the former Fórmula 4 Nacional series held in 2007. Teams can choose chassis manufacturer (Crespi, Tulia, Tito...).

The calendar include 14 races in Argentina:

1. Autódromo Roberto Mouras (February 22), long track without chicanes
2. Autódromo Roberto Mouras (March 15), long track with chicanes
3. Autódromo Roberto Mouras (April 5), long track without chicanes
4. Autódromo Sudamericano de Olavarría (May 10)
5. Autódromo Roberto Mouras (May 31)
6. Autódromo 9 de Julio I (June 14)
7. Autódromo Roberto Mouras (July 5)
8. Autódromo Roberto Mouras (August 16)
9. Autódromo Sudamericano de Olavarría (July 26)
10. Autódromo 9 de Julio II (September 6)
11. Autódromo Roberto Mouras (September 27)
12. Autódromo Roberto Mouras (October 25)
13. Autódromo Roberto Mouras (November 15)
14. Autódromo Oscar Alfredo Gálvez (December 6)

| Pos | Driver | Team | Points |
|---|---|---|---|
| 1 | (Argentina) Emiliano González | Satorra Competición | 182 |
| 2 | (Argentina) Juan José Garriz | Ré Competición | 154 |
| 3 | (Argentina) Claudio Di Noto Rama | Tati Racing | 120 |
| 4 | (Argentina) Bruno Etmann | Satorra Competición | 119 |
| 5 | (Argentina) Lucas Alonso | Casalins Competición, Scudería Ramini | 107 |
| 6 | (Argentina) Bernardo Poggi | Ré Competición | 87 |
| 7 | (Argentina) Maximiliano Vivot | Scudería Ramini, Castro Racing | 87 |
| 8 | (Argentina) Julián Falivene | Tati Racing | 79 |
| 9 | (Argentina) Federico Fastuca | Soncini Team | 66 |
| 10 | (Argentina) Pablo Costanzo | Ré Competición | 61 |
| 11 | (Argentina) Federico Moisés | RSX Motorsport | 44 |
| 12 | (Argentina) Rubén Santana | Scudería Ramini | 39 |
| 13 | (Argentina) Alan Ruggiero | Soncini Racing | 39 |
| 14 | (Argentina) Alejandro Cimiotto | Casalins Competición | 31 |
| 15 | (Argentina) Emanuel Sagratella | Soncini Racing | 25 |
| 16 | (Argentina) Leonardo Martino | Tati Racing | 23 |
| 17 | (Argentina) Luciano Farroni | Scudería Ramini | 22 |
| 18 | (Argentina) Ezequiel Dregín | | 17 |
| 19 | (Argentina) Enzo Pieraligi | | 15 |
| 20 | (Argentina) Germán Sirvent | Soncini Racing | 14 |
| 21 | (Argentina) Federico Camarotta | | 12 |
| 22 | (Argentina) Alan López | Cassalins Competición | 8 |
| 23 | (Argentina) Violeta Pernice | Villa Constitución | 8 |
| 24 | (Argentina) Ayrton Molina | Scudería Ramini | 7 |
| 25 | (Argentina) Juan Manuel Basco | | 7 |
| 26 | (Argentina) Julián Santero | Castro Racing | 7 |
| 27 | (Argentina) Hernán Bueno | Castro Racing | 7 |
| 28 | (Argentina) María Abbate | Scudería Ramini | 6 |
| 29 | (Argentina) Sebastián Peluso | DG Scuderia | 4 |
| 30 | (Argentina) Nicolás Fernandez | Becerra Racing | 2 |
| 31 | (Argentina) Lucas Garro | Ré Competición | 2 |
| 32 | (Argentina) Malek Fara | | 2 |
| 33 | (Argentina) Agustín Alcalde | Alcalde Competición | 2 |
| 34 | (Argentina) Santiago Viscovich | | 1 |
| 35 | (Argentina) Jean Catalano | | 1 |
| 36 | (Argentina) Jorge Morgan | Becerra Sport | 1 |
| 37 | (Argentina) Facundo Onandia | | 1 |
| 38 | (Argentina) Diego Escudero | | 1 |
| 39 | (Argentina) Daniel Nefa | Tati Racing | 1 |
| 40 | (Argentina) Mario Valle | | 1 |

| Colour | Result |
|---|---|
| Gold | Winner |
| Silver | 2nd place |
| Bronze | 3rd place |
| Green | Finished, in points |
| Green | Retired, in points |
| Blue | Finished, no points |
| Purple | Did not finish (Ret) |
| Purple | Not classified (NC) |
| Red | Did not qualify (DNQ) |
| Black | Disqualified (DSQ) |
| White | Did not start (DNS) |
| White | Withdrew (WD) |
| Blank | Did not participate |
| Blank | Injured (INJ) |
| Blank | Excluded (EX) |
| **Bold** | Pole position |
| * | Fastest lap |
| spr | Sprint Race |
| fea | Feature Race |
