= Circuit Paul Armagnac =

Motorsport track in France

- Location: Nogaro, Gers, France
- Coordinates: 43°46′5″N 0°2′17″W
- FIA Grade: 2
- Opened: 3 October 1960; 65 years ago
- Major events: Current: Coupes de Pâques de Nogaro (1968–present); FFSA GT (1997–2011, 2014, 2016–present); TC France Series (2021–present); Alpine Elf Cup (2019–present); Former: Grand Prix motorcycle racing French motorcycle Grand Prix (1978, 1982); European Truck Racing Championship (1994–2016); Blancpain Sprint Series (2013–2015); NASCAR Whelen Euro Series (2009–2013); FIA GT (2007–2008); FIA Sportscar Championship (2003); BPR GT (1995–1996); F3000 (1990–1993); ETCC (1985–1988); Formula 750 (1976, 1979); Sidecar World Championship (1978)
- Website: http://www.circuit-nogaro.com/

Grand Prix Circuit (1989–present) (Note: The start-finish line was changed in 2007, however the layout configuration has not been changed since 1989.)
- Length: 3.636 km (2.259 mi)
- Turns: 14
- Race lap record: 1:20.160 ( (Italy) Alessandro Zanardi, Reynard 91D, 1991, F3000)

Grand Prix Circuit (1973–1988)
- Length: 3.120 km (1.939 mi)
- Turns: 11
- Race lap record: 1:11.860 ( (Argentina) Ricardo Zunino, Arrows A1, 1979, F1)

Original Circuit (1960–1973)
- Length: 1.752 km (1.089 mi)
- Turns: 9
- Race lap record: 0:51.700 ( (France) Christian Ethuin, Martini MK12, 1973, F3)

Circuit Paul Armagnac, also known as Circuit de Nogaro, is a motorsport race track located in the commune of Nogaro in the Gers department in southwestern France. The track is named in honor of Nogaro-born racing driver Paul Armagnac, who died in an accident during practice for the 1962 1000 km de Paris at the Montlhéry circuit.

== History ==
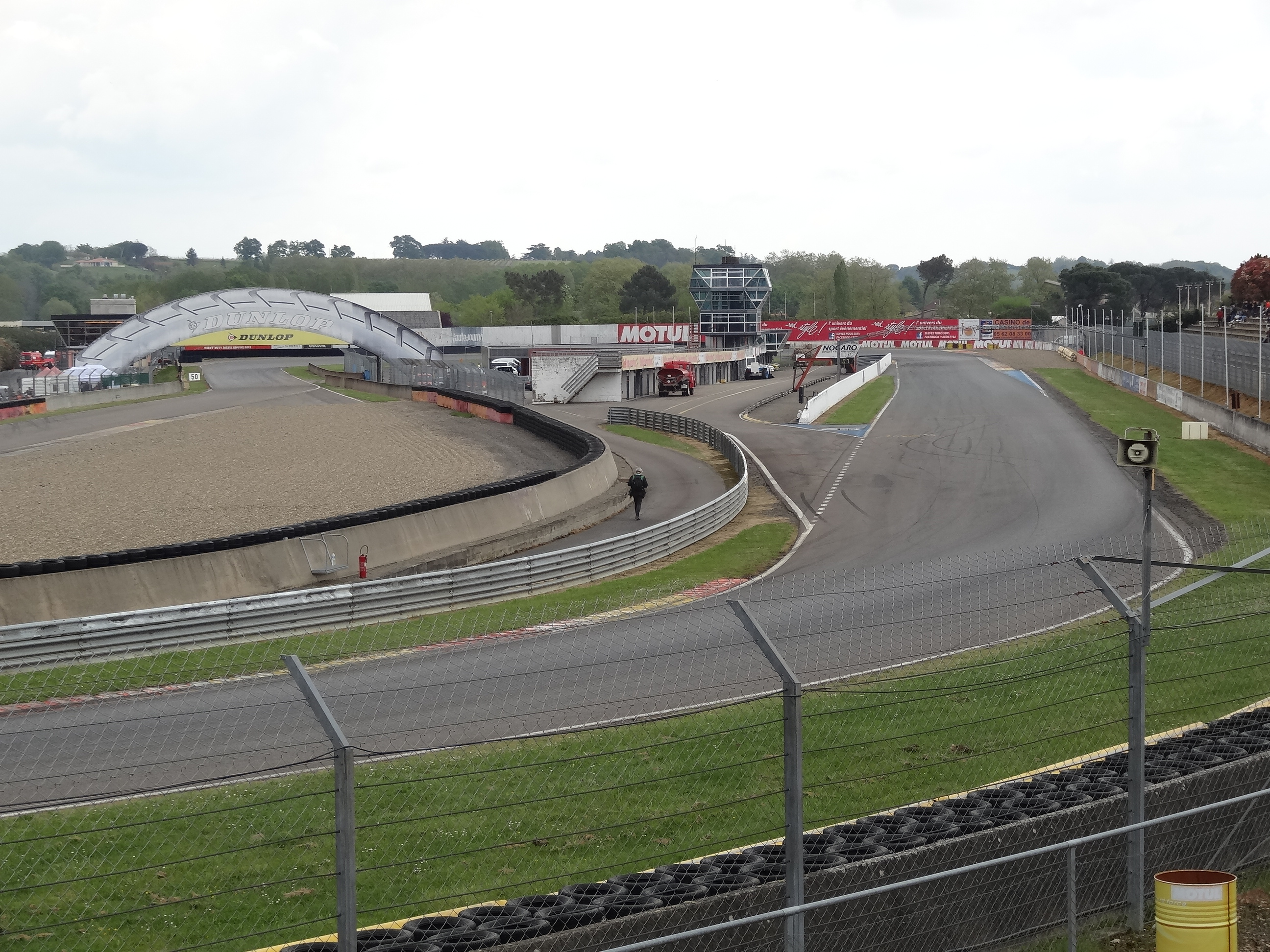
The old pits

Motorsports racing events in Nogaro were first organized when racing driver Paul Armagnac and Robert Castagnon created the Association Sportive Automobile de l'Armagnac. In 1953, the Rallye de l'Armagnac was held on a street circuit using public roads around Nogaro. Public safety concerns after the 1955 Le Mans disaster caused the number of road racing events on public roads in Europe to decrease. Plans were made to create a permanent race circuit and construction began in 1959 at a site near the Nogaro airport.

The race circuit opened on 3 October 1960 as the first purpose-built race circuit in France. The first race held at the new circuit was the Nogaro Grand Prix for Formula Junior cars, won by Bruno Basini. Initially 1.752 km (1.089 mi) long, it was expanded in 1973 and 1989 to its current 3.636 km (2.259 mi) length. In 2007 the circuit was modernized including a new control tower, a new pitlane and widening the track to 12 m (39 ft).

The venue hosted Formula Two championship races from 1975 to 1978. It also hosted the French motorcycle Grand Prix in 1978 and 1982; the 1982 race saw a boycott from major teams and riders over safety concerns, resulting in the now-MotoGP leaving the track permanently at the end of the season. The Nogaro circuit also hosted the European Touring Car Championship from 1985 to 1988.

== Track description ==
The track is relatively flat, with 6 m (20 ft) difference in elevation between its highest and lowest points. It is raced clockwise and consists of two long straights, the 0.950 km (0.590 mi) long start-finish straight named after Nogaro-born motorcycle constructor Claude Fior and the almost parallel aerodrome straight, linked by sections of several slow corners. The aerodrome straight passes alongside the neighbouring Nogaro Aerodrome.

== Events ==
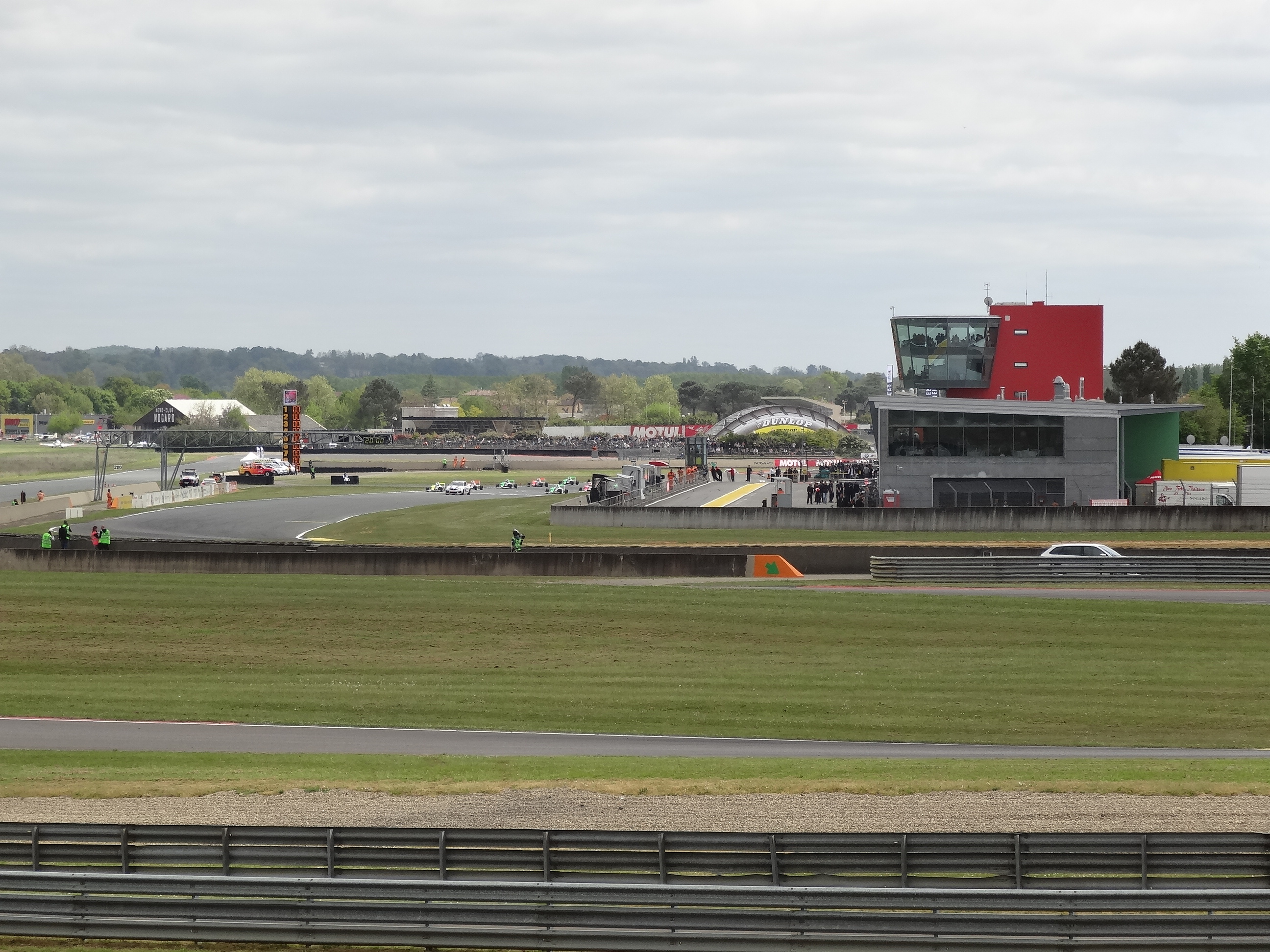
Pits and start/finish line

Current

- April: FFSA GT Championship Coupes de Pâques de Nogaro, Alpine Elf Cup Series, French F4 Championship, Renault Clio Cup Europe, TC France Series
- May: French Superbike Championship
- June: Grand Prix Camions de Nogaro
- September: Fun Cup France

Future

- Porsche Carrera Cup France (1987–2011, 2014, 2019, 2022, 2027)

Former

- Blancpain Sprint Series (2013–2015)
- BPR Global GT Series (1995–1996)
- British Formula One Championship (1979)
- European Eco-Marathon Competition (2000–2009)
- Eurocup Formula Renault (1993, 1996–1997)
- European Formula Two Championship (1975–1978)
- European Touring Car Championship (1985–1988)
- European Truck Racing Championship (2000–2016)
- F4 Spanish Championship (2017)
- FIA European Formula 3 Championship (1982–1984)
- FIA GT Championship (2007–2008)
- FIA GT1 World Championship (2012)
- FIA GT3 European Championship (2008, 2012)
- FIA Sportscar Championship
  - FIA Sportscar Championship Nogaro (2003)
- Formula 3 Euro Series (2007)
- Formula 750 (1976, 1979)
- French Formula Three Championship (1964–1973, 1980–2002)
- French Formula Renault Championship (1971–2009)
- French Supertouring Championship (1976–2005)
- Grand Prix motorcycle racing
  - French motorcycle Grand Prix (1978, 1982)
- GT4 European Series (2007–2008, 2015)
- International Formula 3000
  - Grand Prix de Nogaro (1990–1993)
- NASCAR Whelen Euro Series (2009–2013)
- Sidecar World Championship (1978)
- V de V Series (2011–2012)

== Lap records ==
Current Grand Prix circuit with the original start-finish line (1989–2007)

The official lap record for the current Grand Prix circuit layout is 1:20.160, set by Alessandro Zanardi during the 1991 Nogaro F3000 round, while the unofficial all-time track record is 1:17.342, set by Franck Lagorce in the qualifying of 1993 Nogaro F3000 round. As of May 2026, the fastest official race lap records at the Circuit Paul Armagnac are listed as:

Category	Time	Driver	Vehicle	Event
Grand Prix Circuit (1989–present): 3.636 km (2.259 mi)
Formula 3000	1:20.160	Alessandro Zanardi	Reynard 91D	1991 Nogaro F3000 round
Formula Three	1:22.226	Romain Grosjean	Dallara F305	2007 Nogaro F3 Euro Series round
LMP900	1:23.906	Beppe Gabbiani	Dome S101	2003 Nogaro FIA Sportscar Championship round
LMP3	1:24.218	Nelson Panciatici	Ligier JS P3	2016 Nogaro FFSA GTP round
Formula Renault 2.0	1:24.437	Arthur Pic	Tatuus FR2000	2009 Nogaro Formula Renault 2.0 West European Cup round
GT1 (GTS)	1:25.326	Gregory Franchi	Saleen S7-R	2008 FIA GT Nogaro 2 Hours
Formula 4	1:25.846	Alexandre Munoz	Mygale M21-F4	2025 Nogaro French F4 round
Superbike	1:26.041	Kenny Foray	BMW M1000RR	2026 Nogaro French Superbike round
GT3	1:26.982	Stéphane Ortelli	Audi R8 LMS ultra	2015 Nogaro Blancpain GT Sprint Series round
Porsche Carrera Cup	1:27.807	Louis Perrot	Porsche 911 (992 I) GT3 Cup	2024 Nogaro Porsche Sprint Challenge France round
GT2	1:28.030	Andrew Kirkaldy	Ferrari F430 GT2	2008 FIA GT Nogaro 2 Hours
LMP675	1:28.039	Mirko Savoldi	Lucchini SR2002	2003 Nogaro FIA Sportscar Championship round
Supersport	1:28.189	Corentin Perolari	Honda CBR600RR	2024 Nogaro French Supersport round
GT1	1:28.218	Jean-Marc Gounon	Ferrari F40 GTE	1996 BPR 4 Hours of Nogaro
FIA GT Group 2	1:29.379	Tomáš Enge	Aston Martin Vantage GT2	2008 FIA GT Nogaro 2 Hours
Formula Renault 1.6	1:30.368	Lasse Sørensen	Signatech FR 1.6	2014 Nogaro French F4 round
GT4	1:30.736	Loris Cabirou	Ginetta G56 GT4 Evo	2024 Nogaro French GT4 Cup round
TCR Touring Car	1:31.165	Julien Briché	Hyundai Elantra N TCR	2025 Nogaro TC France round
GT2 (GTS)	1:31.581	Jean-Pierre Jarier	Porsche 911 GT2	1999 Nogaro FFSA GT round
Silhouette racing car	1:31.979	Soheil Ayari	Peugeot 406 Coupé Silhouette	2002 Nogaro French Supertouring round
Alpine Elf Cup	1:32.089	Léo Jousset	Alpine A110 Cup	2025 Nogaro Alpine Elf Cup round
Stock car racing	1:34.838	Ander Vilariño	Chevrolet Camaro NASCAR	2013 Nogaro NASCAR Whelen Euro Series round
Supersport 300	1:38.005	Livio Mirabel	Kawasaki Ninja 400	2024 Nogaro French Supersport 300 round
Renault Clio Cup	1:40.582	Nicolas Milan	Renault Clio R.S. IV	2018 Nogaro Renault Clio Cup France round
Grand Prix Circuit (1973–1988): 3.120 km (1.939 mi)
Formula One	1:11.860	Ricardo Zunino	Arrows A1	1979 Nogaro British F1 round
Formula Three	1:12.120	Éric Bernard	Ralt RT31	1987 1st Nogaro French F3 round
Formula Two	1:12.390	Bruno Giacomelli	March 782	1978 Nogaro F2 round
Formula Renault 2.0	1:21.220	Patrick Gonin	Martini MK33	1981 1st Nogaro French Formula Renault round
Group A	1:21.240	Klaus Ludwig	Ford Sierra RS500 Cosworth	1988 Nogaro ETCC round
500cc	1:22.800	Kenny Roberts	Yamaha YZR500	1978 French motorcycle Grand Prix
350cc	1:24.500	Gregg Hansford	Kawasaki KR350	1978 French motorcycle Grand Prix
250cc	1:25.000	Jean-François Baldé	Kawasaki KR250	1982 French motorcycle Grand Prix
Sidecar (B2A)	1:29.600	Rolf Biland	Beo-Yamaha	1978 French motorcycle Grand Prix
125cc	1:30.060	Jean-Claude Selini	Morbidelli 125 GP	1982 French motorcycle Grand Prix
Original Circuit (1960–1973): 1.752 km (1.089 mi)
Formula Three	0:51.700	Christian Ethuin	Martini MK12	1973 1st Nogaro French F3 round
Formula Renault 2.0	0:59.300	Max Jean	Martini MK33	1968 1st Nogaro French Formula Renault round
Formula Junior	1:03.000	Jean Vinatier	Lotus 27	1963 Nogaro French Formula Junior round
