= Cravencères =

- Commune
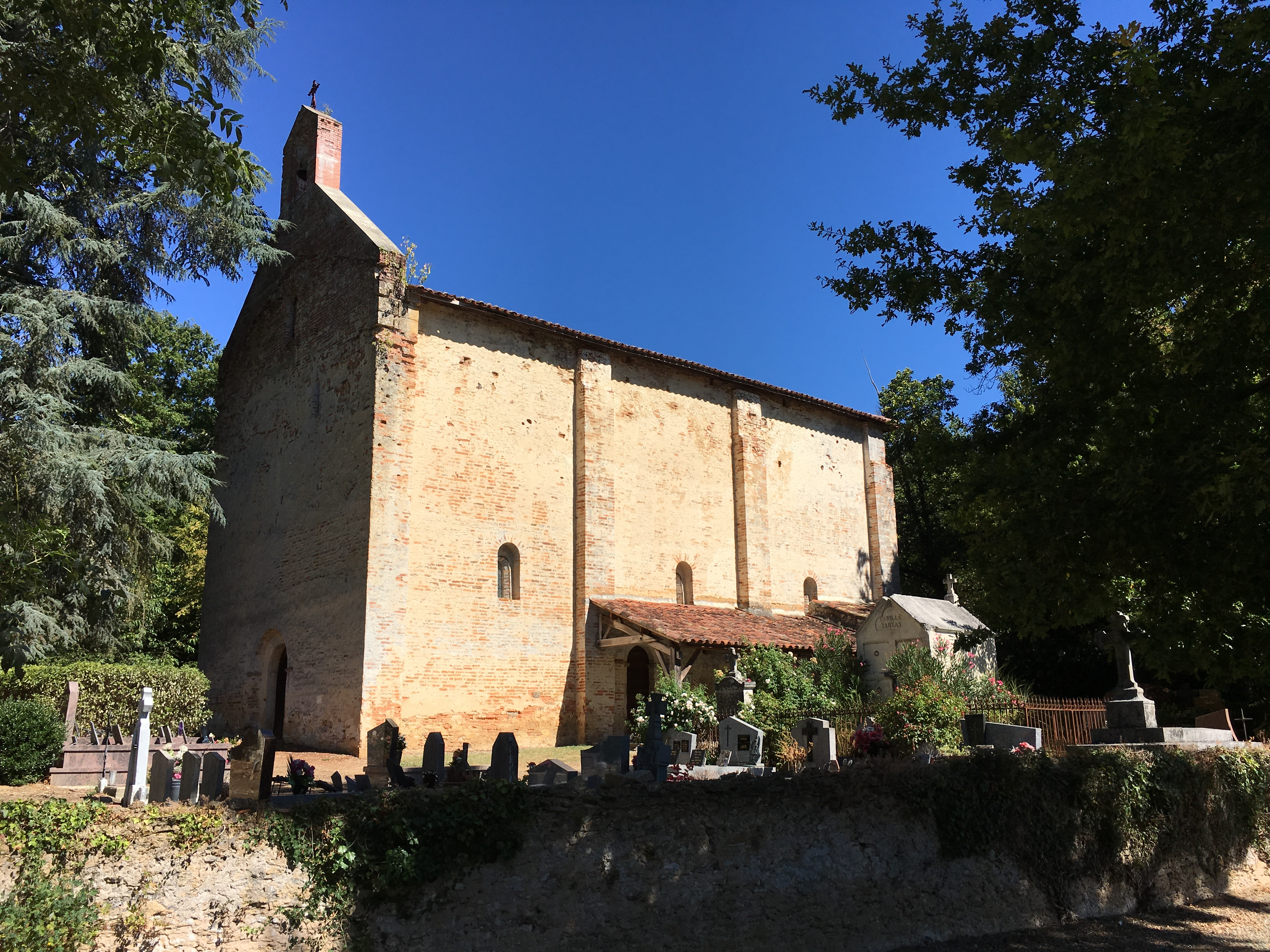
- The chapel in Cravencères
- Location of Cravencères
- Location within France Location within Occitanie
- Coordinates: 43°46′00″N 0°02′12″E
- Country: France
- Region: Occitania
- Department: Gers
- Arrondissement: Condom
- Canton: Grand-Bas-Armagnac

Government
  - Mayor (2020–2026): Jean-Pierre Larrandaburu
- Area^{1}: 9.09 km^{2} (3.51 sq mi)
- Elevation: 125 m (410 ft)
- Highest elevation: 180 m (590 ft)
- Lowest elevation: 97 m (318 ft)
- Population (2023): 95
  - Density: 10/km^{2} (27/sq mi)
- Time zone: UTC+01:00 (CET)
  - Summer (DST): UTC+02:00 (CEST)
- INSEE/Postal code: 32113 /32110
- ^{1} French Land Register data, which excludes lakes, ponds, glaciers > 1 km^{2} (0.386 sq mi or 247 acres) and river estuaries.

Cravencères (French pronunciation: [kʁavɑ̃sɛʁ]; Occitan: Cravencèra) is a commune in the Gers department in southwestern France.

== Geography ==
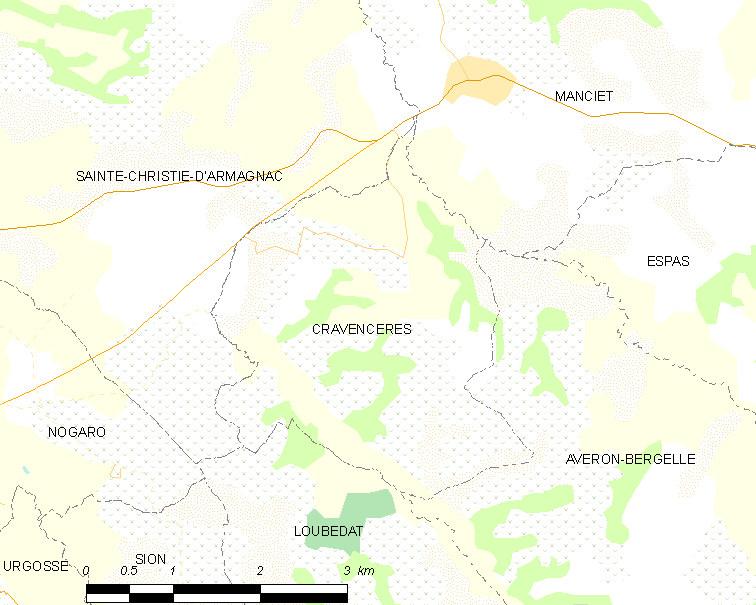
Cravencères and its surrounding communes

== Population ==
Historical population
Year	Pop.	±% p.a.
1968	154	—
1975	151	−0.28%
1982	124	−2.78%
1990	112	−1.26%
1999	118	+0.58%
2007	102	−1.80%
2012	99	−0.60%
2017	92	−1.46%
2023	95	+0.54%
Source: INSEE

== Notable people ==
The historian and palaeographer Charles Samaran (1879–1982) was born in Cravencères.

== See also ==
- Communes of the Gers department
