= Charles Samaran =

French historian and archivist (1879–1982)

- Born: 28 October 1879; Cravencères (Gers)
- Died: 15 October 1982 (aged 102); Nogaro (Gers)
- Education: National School of charters
- Occupations: Historian; Archivist
- Partner: Marie-Camille Taffanel
- Children: Annette Thiollier

Charles Samaran (28 October 1879 – 15 October 1982) was a 20th-century French historian and archivist, who was born in Cravencères (in the Gers) and died at Nogaro (also in the Gers), shortly before his 103rd birthday.

== Biography ==
Having graduated as an archivist-palaeographer in 1901 with a thesis devoted to the House of Armagnac then working as a member of the École française de Rome (1901–1903), Charles Samaran became an archivist at the Archives nationales. In 1908 he published Les diplômes originaux des Mérovingiens, "an extraordinary achievement by a young palaeographer who would remain until his old age an infallible decipherer of difficult texts", a collection which played a key role in the study of Merovingian scriptures.

Critical literary studies and editions of texts from all periods (dispatches from Milanese ambassadors under Louis XI, Casanova's memoirs) followed, which would continue throughout his teaching (John Chartier, Thomas Basin, The Song of Roland in the literary field, acts of University of Paris in the pragmatic field).

He was appointed research director at the École pratique des hautes études in 1927 (chair of palaeography) then professor of "bibliography and archives of the history of France" at the École Nationale des Chartes from 1933 to 1941 and director of the Bibliothèque de l'Ecole des chartes from 1935 to 1948

He was elected at the Académie des Inscriptions et Belles-Lettres in 1941 and appointed general director of the Service interministériel des Archives de France by minister Jérôme Carcopino the same year. He remained in that position until 1948, maintained beyond the retirement age. He was president of the Comité des travaux historiques et scientifiques from 1960 to 1982.

Samaran became co-founder of the International Committee for Palaeography in 1953, as well as founder of the Catalogue de Manuscrits datés and co-founder of the International Council on Archives. Additionally, Samaran was a prolific author with several hundred titles in his personal bibliography. Notably, Samaran continued his work until his 100th birthday.

Charles Samaran was the step-son of flautist Paul Taffanel, creator of the French school of flute. He had three daughters: Annette (wife of Philippe Thiollier), Charlotte (wife of Jacques Lacome Estalenx) and Jeanne. His wife died in 1962 at age 80.

== Iconography ==
A medal bearing the likeness of Charles Samaran at the age of seventy-six was executed by Aleth Guzman-Nageotte in 1955. A copy is kept in the Carnavalet Museum (ND 5153).

== Bibliography ==
(partial list)

- La fiscalité pontificale en France au XIVe (période d'Avignon et grand schisme d'Occident), Paris, A. Fontemoing, 1905.
- La maison d'Armagnac au XVe et les dernières luttes de la féodalité dans le Midi de la France, Paris, A. Picard et fils, 1907.
- Les diplômes originaux des Mérovingiens : fac-similés phototypiques avec notices et transcriptions, éd. Ph. Lauer, Ch. Samaran, préf. Maurice Prou, Paris, E. Leroux, 1908.
- D'Artagnan, Capitaine des mousquetaires du roi, histoire véridique d'un héros de roman, Paris, Calmann-Lévy, 1912.
- Jacques Casanova, Vénitien, une vie d'aventurier au XVIIIe, Paris, Calmann-Lévy, 1914.
- Jean de Bilhères-Lagraulas, cardinal de Saint-Denis, un diplomate français sous Louis XI et Charles VIII, Paris, Éditions Honoré Champion, 1920. (Extrait par Paul-André Lesort).
- La chronique latine inédite de Jean Chartier (1422–1450), Paris, Champion, 1928.
- Catalogue des manuscrits en écriture latine portant des indications de date, de lieu ou de copiste, Paris, CNRS, 1959.
- L' Histoire et ses Méthodes, Paris, Gallimard, « Encyclopédie de la Pleïade », 1961, XVII–1773, read online.
- Pierre Bersuire, prieur de Saint-Eloi de Paris, 1290?-1362, Paris, Imprimerie nationale, 1962.
- Paysages littéraires du Valois, de Rousseau à Nerval, Paris, Klincksieck, 1964.
- La Gascogne dans les registres du trésor des chartes, Paris, Bibliothèque nationale, 1966.
- D'Artagnan, capitaine des mousquetaires du roi, histoire véridique d'un héros de roman, Auch, impr. T. Bouquet, 1967.
- La Fiscalité pontificale en France au XIVe, période d'Avignon et grand schisme d'Occident, Paris, E. Boccard, 1968.
- Inauguration d'une plaque sur la maison de Joseph de Pesquidoux à Perchède le 11 septembre 1971, Paris, Typ. de Firmin-Didot, 1972.
- La maison d'Armagnac au XVe et les dernières luttes de la féodalité dans le Midi de la France, Genève, Slatkine-Megariotis Reprints, 1975.
- Recueil d'études de Charles Samaran... une longue vie d'érudit, Genève et Paris, Droz, Librairie Champion, « Hautes études médiévales et modernes », 1978.

== Sources ==
His personal papers are kept at the Archives nationales under the class number 642AP
