= Nogaro Aerodrome =

Nogaro Aerodrome Aérodrome de Nogaro
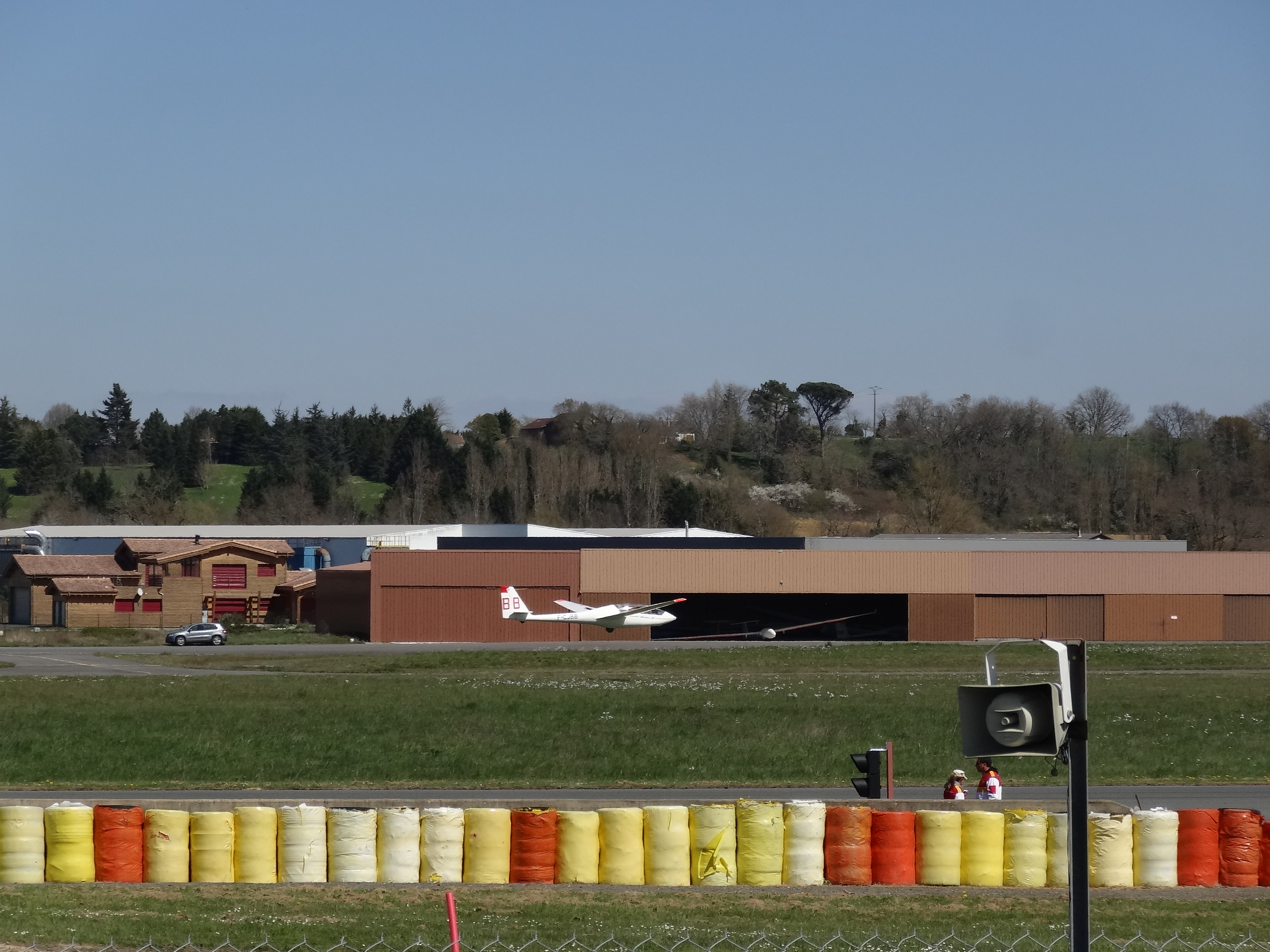
- IATA: none; ICAO: LFCN

Summary
- Airport type: Public
- Location: Nogaro, France
- Elevation AMSL: 93 m (305 ft)
- Coordinates: 43°46′08″N 000°02′05″W

Map
- Location of airport in France

Runways
| Direction | Length | | Surface |
| Direction | ft | m | Surface |
|---|---|---|---|
| 14L/32R | 3,600 | 1,100 | Asphalt |
| 14R/32L | 3,120 | 950 | Grass |
- Source: French AIP

Nogaro Aerodrome (ICAO: LFCN) is located in Nogaro in the Gers department of the Occitanie region of France.

The aerodrome was built in 1932 on the initiative of Jean Armagnac, municipal councillor of Nogaro, to accommodate the motor flight activities of the Bas-Armagnac aero-club which he founded and which began with a Caudron C.270 Luciole. In 1946, a gliding section was added.

In 1960, an unused piece of land was sold to his son Paul to create an autodrome, which would become the Circuit Paul Armagnac. Its longest straight, called the "airfield straight", runs parallel to the grass runway.

== Specifications ==
The aerodrome has two runways facing north-west/south-east:

- A paved track (14L/32R) 1,000 meters long and 23 wide
- A grass runway (14R/32L) 950 meters long and 65 wide

The aerodrome is not controlled. Pilots use the 119.500 MHz frequency.

== Facilities ==
There is a fueling station selling 100LL fuel and lubricant. The maintenance company Nogaro Aviation is based at the field.

The aerodrome is part of the "Nogaropôle", an industrial and technological complex.
