= Nogaro =

- Commune
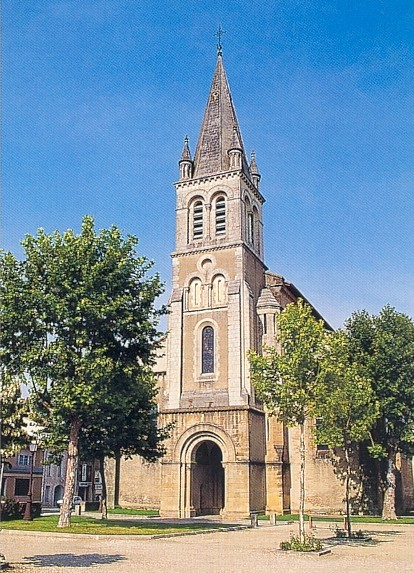
- Saint-Nicolas church

- Coat of arms
- Location of Nogaro
- Location within France Location within Occitanie
- Coordinates: 43°46′N 0°02′W
- Country: France
- Region: Occitania
- Department: Gers
- Arrondissement: Condom
- Canton: Grand-Bas-Armagnac
- Intercommunality: Bas-Armagnac

Government
  - Mayor (2020–2026): Christian Peyret
- Area^{1}: 11.06 km^{2} (4.27 sq mi)
- Highest elevation: 148 m (486 ft)
- Lowest elevation: 89 m (292 ft)
- Population (2023): 2,238
  - Density: 202.4/km^{2} (524.1/sq mi)
- Time zone: UTC+01:00 (CET)
  - Summer (DST): UTC+02:00 (CEST)
- INSEE/Postal code: 32296 /32110
- ^{1} French Land Register data, which excludes lakes, ponds, glaciers > 1 km^{2} (0.386 sq mi or 247 acres) and river estuaries.

Nogaro (French pronunciation: [nɔɡaʁo]; Gascon: Nogaròu) is a commune in the Gers department, Southwestern France. It is the site of a distillery of Armagnac brandy.

== Geography ==
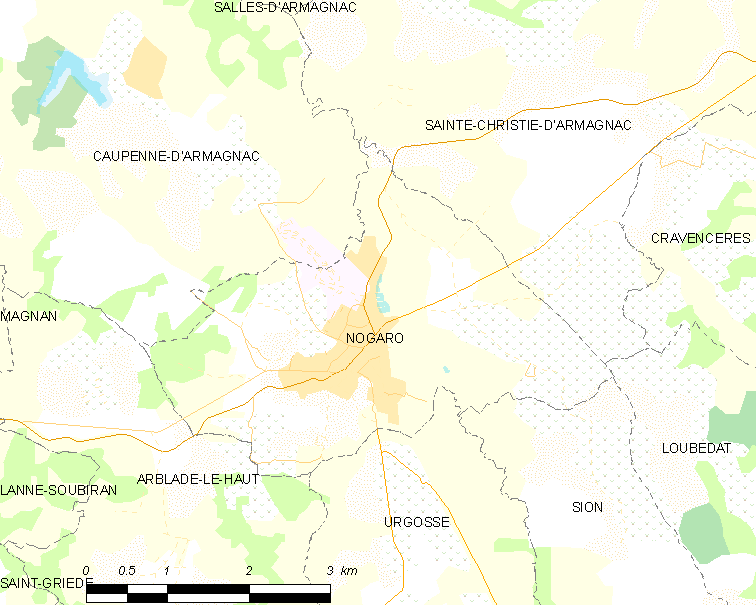
Nogaro and its surrounding communes

The commune is bordered by six other communes: Caupenne-d'Armagnac to the northwest, Sainte-Christie-d'Armagnac to the northeast, Loubédat to the east, Sion to the southeast, Urgosse to the south, and finally by Arblade-le-Haut to the west.

== Population ==
Historical population
Year	Pop.	±% p.a.
1968	2,140	—
1975	2,113	−0.18%
1982	2,013	−0.69%
1990	2,008	−0.03%
1999	1,881	−0.72%
2007	1,975	+0.61%
2012	1,966	−0.09%
2017	2,009	+0.43%
2023	2,238	+1.82%
Source: INSEE

== Facilities ==
Nogaro is the site of Circuit Paul Armagnac, a motorsport race track, and the neighbouring Nogaro Aerodrome.

== Notable people ==
The historian and palaeographer Charles Samaran (1879–1982) died in Nogaro.

The chef and television host Michel Sarran was born in Nogaro.

The tennis player Tessah Andrianjafitrimo has lived in Nogaro since 2010.

== See also ==
- Communes of the Gers department
