= Autódromo Juan Oria =

Motorsports circuit in Argentina

- Circuit N°2 (1976–present)
- Location: Marcos Juárez, Córdoba, Argentina
- Coordinates: 32°41′2.4″S 62°8′56.1″W
- Opened: 27 November 1976; 48 years ago
- Former names: Marcos Juárez Motor Club Circuit
- Major events: Turismo Nacional (1982, 1984, 1988–1989, 1994–1996); TC2000 (1981, 1983–1985)

Circuit N°2 (1976–present)
- Length: 2.250 km (1.398 mi)
- Turns: 10

Circuit N°1 (1976–present)
- Length: 1.650 km (1.025 mi)
- Turns: 6

Autódromo Juan Oria is a 2.250 km (1.398 mi) motorsports circuit located near Marcos Juárez, Argentina. The circuit has 10 corners.

The circuit has hosted a number of national level series over the years including the TC2000 Championship, Formula Renault Argentina and Top Race V6. The last national event to be held at the circuit was the final race of the 1999 Top Race V6 season.
