= 2017 TCR International Series Hungaroring round =

(Hungary) 2017 TCR International Series Hungaroring round
Round details
- Round 6 of 10 rounds in the 2017 TCR International Series
- Layout of the Hungaroring
- Location: Hungaroring, Mogyoród, Hungary
- Course: Permanent racing facility 4.381 km (2.722 mi)

TCR International Series

Race 1
- Date: 18 June 2017
- Laps: 14

Pole position
Driver	(Hungary) Norbert Michelisz	M1RA
- Time: 1:52.740

Podium
First	(Hungary) Attila Tassi	M1RA
Second	(Hungary) Norbert Michelisz	M1RA
Third	(France) Jean-Karl Vernay	Leopard Racing Team WRT

Fastest lap
Driver	(Hungary) Norbert Michelisz	M1RA
- Time: 1:54.252 (on lap 7)

Race 2
- Date: 18 June 2017
- Laps: 14

Podium
First	(Hungary) Attila Tassi	M1RA
Second	(Spain) Pepe Oriola	Lukoil Craft-Bamboo Racing
Third	(Denmark) Jens Reno Møller	Reno Racing

Fastest lap
Driver	(Spain) Pepe Oriola	Lukoil Craft-Bamboo Racing
- Time: 1:54.330 (on lap 4)

The 2017 TCR International Series Hungaroring round was the sixth round of the 2017 TCR International Series season. It took place on 18 June at the Hungaroring.

Attila Tassi won both races starting from third position in Race 1 and eighth position in Race 2, driving a Honda Civic Type-R TCR.

== Ballast ==
Due to the results obtained in the previous round, Stefano Comini received +30 kilograms (66 lb), Dušan Borković +20 kilograms (44 lb) and both Roberto Colciago and Thomas Jäger +10 kilograms (22 lb). Nevertheless, Jäger didn't take part at this event, so he didn't take the ballast.

The Balance of Performance was also adjusted for this event, meaning the Honda Civic Type-R TCRs was given an additional +10 kilograms (22 lb), having already had +30 kilograms (66 lb), in addition to its minimum weight of 1,285 kilograms (2,833 lb). The SEAT León TCRs and Volkswagen Golf GTI TCRs was also given a weight break, going down -10 kg.

== Classification ==
=== Qualifying ===
Pos.	No.	Driver	Car	Team	Q1	Q2	Grid	Points
1	59	(Hungary) Norbert Michelisz	Honda Civic Type-R TCR	(Hungary) M1RA	1:53.209^{1}	1:52.740	1	5
2	2	(France) Jean-Karl Vernay	Volkswagen Golf GTI TCR	(Luxembourg) Leopard Racing Team WRT	1:53.030^{1}	1:53.354	2	4
3	9	(Hungary) Attila Tassi	Honda Civic Type-R TCR	(Hungary) M1RA	1:53.347^{1}	1:53.406^{2}	3	3
4	74	(Spain) Pepe Oriola	SEAT León TCR	(Hong Kong) Lukoil Craft-Bamboo Racing	1:53.728^{1}	1:53.739^{2}	4	2
5	5	(Italy) Roberto Colciago	Honda Civic Type-R TCR	(Hungary) M1RA	1:54.180^{1}	1:53.835^{2}	5	1
6	3	(United Kingdom) Robert Huff	Volkswagen Golf GTI TCR	(Luxembourg) Leopard Racing Team WRT	1:54.170^{1}	1:53.846	6	
7	34	(Norway) Stian Paulsen	SEAT León TCR	(Norway) Stian Paulsen Racing	1:54.430	1:54.143	7	
8	10	(Italy) Gianni Morbidelli	Volkswagen Golf GTI TCR	(Sweden) WestCoast Racing	1:54.357^{1}	1:54.565	8	
9	21	(Italy) Giacomo Altoè	Volkswagen Golf GTI TCR	(Sweden) WestCoast Racing	1:53.900	1:54.620	9	
10	11	(Denmark) Jens Reno Møller	Honda Civic Type-R TCR	(Denmark) Reno Racing	1:54.172^{1}	2:01.165	10	
11	17	(United Kingdom) Daniel Lloyd	SEAT León TCR	(Hong Kong) Lukoil Craft-Bamboo Racing	1:53.987	No time^{2}	11	
12	54	(United Kingdom) James Nash	SEAT León TCR	(Hong Kong) Lukoil Craft-Bamboo Racing	1:54.632^{1}		12	
13	6	(Belgium) Frédéric Vervisch	Audi RS3 LMS TCR	(Belgium) Comtoyou Racing	1:54.652^{1}		25^{3}	
14	80	(Hungary) Dániel Nagy	SEAT León TCR	(Hungary) Zengő Motorsport	1:54.667		13	
15	16	(Georgia (country)) Davit Kajaia	Alfa Romeo Giulietta TCR	(Georgia (country)) GE-Force	1:54.735^{1}		14	
16	1	(Switzerland) Stefano Comini	Audi RS3 LMS TCR	(Belgium) Comtoyou Racing	1:54.742^{1}		15	
17	62	(Serbia) Dušan Borković	Alfa Romeo Giulietta TCR	(Georgia (country)) GE-Force	1:54.945^{1}		16	
18	66	(France) Grégoire Demoustier	Opel Astra TCR	(Belgium) DG Sport Compétition	1:55.037		17	
19	18	(United States) Duncan Ende	SEAT León TCR	(United States) Icarus Motorsports	1:55.833		18	
20	26	(Hungary) István Bernula	Kia Cee'd TCR	(Hungary) Botka Rally Team	1:56.283^{1}		19	
21	20	(Hungary) Márk Jedlóczky	Alfa Romeo Giulietta TCR	(Hungary) Unicorse Team	1:57.038		20	
22	55	(Hungary) Ferenc Ficza	Kia Cee'd TCR	(Hungary) Zengő Motorsport	1:57.064		24^{3}	
23	77	(Hungary) Anett György	SEAT León TCR	(Hungary) Zengő Motorsport	1:59.863		21	
24	31	(Serbia) Milovan Vesnić	Audi RS3 LMS TCR	(Serbia) ASK Vesnić	2:00.651		22	
25	78	(Hungary) Csaba Tóth	SEAT León TCR	(Hungary) Zengő Motorsport	2:00.807		23	
EX	70	(Slovakia) Maťo Homola	Opel Astra TCR	(Belgium) DG Sport Compétition	No time^{1} ^{4}		26	

Notes

- ^1 — Stefano Comini, Jean-Karl Vernay, Robert Huff, Roberto Colciago, Frédéric Vervisch, Attila Tassi, Gianni Morbidelli, Jens Reno Møller, Davit Kajaia, István Bernula, James Nash, Norbert Michelisz, Dušan Borković, Maťo Homola and Pepe Oriola all had their best laptimes deleted during Q1, for not respecting the track limits.
- ^2 — Roberto Colciago, Attila Tassi, Daniel Lloyd, and Pepe Oriola all had their best laptimes deleted during Q2, for not respecting the track limits.
- ^3 — Frédéric Vervisch and Ferenc Ficza was sent to the back of the grid for Race 1, after an engine change. Which in Ficza's case was a car change, a penalty he carried over from the Salzburgring round after Ficza's car was withdrawn from the event after a crash in Free Practice.
- ^4 — Maťo Homola was excluded from qualifying and therefore had all his qualifying times deleted, after his car was found to not conform to the homologation form.

=== Race 1 ===
Pos.	No.	Driver	Car	Team	Laps	Time/Retired	Grid	Points
1	9	(Hungary) Attila Tassi	Honda Civic Type-R TCR	(Hungary) M1RA	14	26:56.484	3	25
2	59	(Hungary) Norbert Michelisz	Honda Civic Type-R TCR	(Hungary) M1RA	14	+0.865	1	18
3	2	(France) Jean-Karl Vernay	Volkswagen Golf GTI TCR	(Luxembourg) Leopard Racing Team WRT	14	+1.744	2	15
4	5	(Italy) Roberto Colciago	Honda Civic Type-R TCR	(Hungary) M1RA	14	+12.769	5	12
5	74	(Spain) Pepe Oriola	SEAT León TCR	(Hong Kong) Lukoil Craft-Bamboo Racing	14	+14.029	4	10
6	17	(United Kingdom) Daniel Lloyd	SEAT León TCR	(Hong Kong) Lukoil Craft-Bamboo Racing	14	+14.959	11	8
7	54	(United Kingdom) James Nash	SEAT León TCR	(Hong Kong) Lukoil Craft-Bamboo Racing	14	+22.569	12	6
8	21	(Italy) Giacomo Altoè	Volkswagen Golf GTI TCR	(Sweden) WestCoast Racing	14	+25.074	9	4
9	10	(Italy) Gianni Morbidelli	Volkswagen Golf GTI TCR	(Sweden) WestCoast Racing	14	+27.869	8	2
10	70	(Slovakia) Maťo Homola	Opel Astra TCR	(Belgium) DG Sport Compétition	14	+0.873	26	1
11	16	(Georgia (country)) Davit Kajaia	Alfa Romeo Giulietta TCR	(Georgia (country)) GE-Force	14	+31.270	14	
12	1	(Switzerland) Stefano Comini	Audi RS3 LMS TCR	(Belgium) Comtoyou Racing	14	+35.479	15	
13	66	(France) Grégoire Demoustier	Opel Astra TCR	(Belgium) DG Sport Compétition	14	+35.893	17	
14	11	(Denmark) Jens Reno Møller	Honda Civic Type-R TCR	(Denmark) Reno Racing	14	+37.904	10	
15	80	(Hungary) Dániel Nagy	SEAT León TCR	(Hungary) Zengő Motorsport	14	+39.106	13	
16	20	(Hungary) Márk Jedlóczky	Alfa Romeo Giulietta TCR	(Hungary) Unicorse Team	14	+41.898	20	
17	31	(Serbia) Milovan Vesnić	Audi RS3 LMS TCR	(Serbia) ASK Vesnić	14	+45.984	22	
18	77	(Hungary) Anett György	SEAT León TCR	(Hungary) Zengő Motorsport	14	+1:10.487	21	
19	55	(Hungary) Ferenc Ficza	Kia Cee'd TCR	(Hungary) Zengő Motorsport	14	+1:10.742^{5}	24	
20	78	(Hungary) Csaba Tóth	SEAT León TCR	(Hungary) Zengő Motorsport	14	+1:27.955	23	
Ret	6	(Belgium) Frédéric Vervisch	Audi RS3 LMS TCR	(Belgium) Comtoyou Racing	7	Technical	25	
Ret	62	(Serbia) Dušan Borković	Alfa Romeo Giulietta TCR	(Georgia (country)) GE-Force	7	Collision	16	
Ret	3	(United Kingdom) Robert Huff	Volkswagen Golf GTI TCR	(Luxembourg) Leopard Racing Team WRT	2	Technical	6	
Ret	34	(Norway) Stian Paulsen	SEAT León TCR	(Norway) Stian Paulsen Racing	2	Collision	7	
Ret	18	(United States) Duncan Ende	SEAT León TCR	(United States) Icarus Motorsports	0	Driveshaft	18	
DNS	26	(Hungary) István Bernula	Kia Cee'd TCR	(Hungary) Botka Rally Team		Technical	19	

Notes

- ^5 — Ferenc Ficza was giving a 30 sec. penalty post race, after he had lined up in the wrong grid position.

=== Race 2 ===
Pos.	No.	Driver	Car	Team	Laps	Time/Retired	Grid	Points
1	9	(Hungary) Attila Tassi	Honda Civic Type-R TCR	(Hungary) M1RA	14	29:20.272	8	25
2	74	(Spain) Pepe Oriola	SEAT León TCR	(Hong Kong) Lukoil Craft-Bamboo Racing	14	+1.861	7	18
3	11	(Denmark) Jens Reno Møller	Honda Civic Type-R TCR	(Denmark) Reno Racing	14	+3.283	1	15
4	21	(Italy) Giacomo Altoè	Volkswagen Golf GTI TCR	(Sweden) WestCoast Racing	14	+3.765	2	12
5	5	(Italy) Roberto Colciago	Honda Civic Type-R TCR	(Hungary) M1RA	14	+4.397	6	10
6	59	(Hungary) Norbert Michelisz	Honda Civic Type-R TCR	(Hungary) M1RA	14	+4.980	10	8
7	2	(France) Jean-Karl Vernay	Volkswagen Golf GTI TCR	(Luxembourg) Leopard Racing Team WRT	14	+5.372	9	6
8	34	(Norway) Stian Paulsen	SEAT León TCR	(Norway) Stian Paulsen Racing	14	+6.254	4	4
9	54	(United Kingdom) James Nash	SEAT León TCR	(Hong Kong) Lukoil Craft-Bamboo Racing	14	+12.055	12	2
10	1	(Switzerland) Stefano Comini	Audi RS3 LMS TCR	(Belgium) Comtoyou Racing	14	+17.135	16	1
11	3	(United Kingdom) Robert Huff	Volkswagen Golf GTI TCR	(Luxembourg) Leopard Racing Team WRT	14	+17.400	5	
12	70	(Slovakia) Maťo Homola	Opel Astra TCR	(Belgium) DG Sport Compétition	14	+18.505	24	
13	66	(France) Grégoire Demoustier	Opel Astra TCR	(Belgium) DG Sport Compétition	14	+21.975	18	
14	55	(Hungary) Ferenc Ficza	Kia Cee'd TCR	(Hungary) Zengő Motorsport	14	+28.923	20	
15	20	(Hungary) Márk Jedlóczky	Alfa Romeo Giulietta TCR	(Hungary) Unicorse Team	14	+33.914	19	
16	26	(Hungary) István Bernula	Kia Cee'd TCR	(Hungary) Botka Rally Team	14	+38.193	26^{6}	
17	77	(Hungary) Anett György	SEAT León TCR	(Hungary) Zengő Motorsport	14	+59.176	21	
18	78	(Hungary) Csaba Tóth	SEAT León TCR	(Hungary) Zengő Motorsport	14	+1:14.998	23	
19	31	(Serbia) Milovan Vesnić	Audi RS3 LMS TCR	(Serbia) ASK Vesnić	12	+2 laps	22	
20	6	(Belgium) Frédéric Vervisch	Audi RS3 LMS TCR	(Belgium) Comtoyou Racing	11	+3 laps	13	
Ret	18	(United States) Duncan Ende	SEAT León TCR	(United States) Icarus Motorsports	8	Driveshaft	25^{6}	
Ret	62	(Serbia) Dušan Borković	Alfa Romeo Giulietta TCR	(Georgia (country)) GE-Force	8	Power steering	17	
Ret	10	(Italy) Gianni Morbidelli	Volkswagen Golf GTI TCR	(Sweden) WestCoast Racing	0	Accident	3	
Ret	17	(United Kingdom) Daniel Lloyd	SEAT León TCR	(Hong Kong) Lukoil Craft-Bamboo Racing	0	Accident	11	
Ret	16	(Georgia (country)) Davit Kajaia	Alfa Romeo Giulietta TCR	(Georgia (country)) GE-Force	0	Accident	15	
DNS	80	(Hungary) Dániel Nagy	SEAT León TCR	(Hungary) Zengő Motorsport		Technical	14	

Notes

- ^6 — Duncan Ende and István Bernula was both sent to the back of the grid, for having broken parc fermé after Race 1.

== Standings after the event ==
Drivers' Championship standings

	Pos	Driver	Points
3	1	(Hungary) Attila Tassi	151
	2	(Italy) Roberto Colciago	145
	3	(France) Jean-Karl Vernay	138
3	4	(Switzerland) Stefano Comini	126
1	5	(Spain) Pepe Oriola	109

Model of the Year standings

	Pos	Car	Points
	1	Honda Civic Type-R TCR	358
	2	SEAT León TCR	263
1	3	Volkswagen Golf GTI TCR	224
1	4	Audi RS3 LMS TCR	194
	5	Alfa Romeo Giulietta TCR	153

Teams' Championship standings

	Pos	Driver	Points
	1	(Hungary) M1RA	308
	2	(Hong Kong) Lukoil Craft-Bamboo Racing	229
	3	(Belgium) Comtoyou Racing	185
1	4	(Luxembourg) Leopard Racing Team WRT	169
1	5	(Georgia (country)) GE-Force	143

- Note: Only the top five positions are included for both sets of drivers' standings.
