= 2017 TCR International Series Salzburgring round =

(Austria) 2017 TCR International Series Salzburgring round
Round details
- Round 5 of 10 rounds in the 2017 TCR International Series
- Layout of the Salzburgring
- Location: Salzburgring, Salzburg, Austria
- Course: Permanent racing facility 4.230 km (2.630 mi)

TCR International Series

Race 1
- Date: 11 June 2017
- Laps: 14

Pole position
| Driver | (Slovakia) Maťo Homola | DG Sport Compétition |
- Time: 1:25.481

Podium
| First | (Serbia) Dušan Borković | GE-Force |
| Second | (Slovakia) Maťo Homola | DG Sport Compétition |
| Third | (Switzerland) Stefano Comini | Comtoyou Racing |

Fastest lap
| Driver | (Switzerland) Stefano Comini | Comtoyou Racing |
- Time: 1:26.791 (on lap 4)

Race 2
- Date: 11 June 2017
- Laps: 17

Podium
| First | (Italy) Roberto Colciago | M1RA |
| Second | (Hungary) Attila Tassi | M1RA |
| Third | (Switzerland) Stefano Comini | Comtoyou Racing |

Fastest lap
| Driver | (Austria) Thomas Jäger | Kissling Motorsport |
- Time: 1:26.583 (on lap 5)

The 2017 TCR International Series Salzburgring round was the fifth round of the 2017 TCR International Series season. It took place on 11 June at the Salzburgring.

Dušan Borković won the first race starting from second position, driving an Alfa Romeo Giulietta TCR, and Roberto Colciago gained the second one, driving a Honda Civic Type-R TCR.

== Ballast ==
Due to the results obtained in the previous round, Roberto Colciago received +30 kg, Frédéric Vervisch +20 kg and Stefano Comini +10 kg.

== Classification ==
=== Qualifying ===
| Pos. | No. | Driver | Car | Team | Q1 | Q2 | Grid | Points |
|---|---|---|---|---|---|---|---|---|
| 1 | 70 | (Slovakia) Maťo Homola | Opel Astra TCR | (Belgium) DG Sport Compétition | 1:26.169 | 1:25.481 | 1 | 5 |
| 2 | 62 | (Serbia) Dušan Borković | Alfa Romeo Giulietta TCR | (Georgia (country)) GE-Force | 1:26.041 | 1:25.552 | 2 | 4 |
| 3 | 74 | (Spain) Pepe Oriola | SEAT León TCR | (Hong Kong) Lukoil Craft-Bamboo Racing | 1:26.180 | 1:25.558 | 3 | 3 |
| 4 | 9 | (Hungary) Attila Tassi | Honda Civic Type-R TCR | (Hungary) M1RA | 1:25.992 | 1:25.636 | 21^{1} | 2 |
| 5 | 35 | (Austria) Thomas Jäger | Opel Astra TCR | (Germany) Kissling Motorsport | 1:26.011 | 1:25.950 | 4 | 1 |
| 6 | 54 | (United Kingdom) James Nash | SEAT León TCR | (Hong Kong) Lukoil Craft-Bamboo Racing | 1:26.260 | 1:25.954 | 5 | |
| 7 | 3 | (United Kingdom) Robert Huff | Volkswagen Golf GTI TCR | (Luxembourg) Leopard Racing Team WRT | 1:26.166 | 1:26.015 | 22^{1} | |
| 8 | 1 | (Switzerland) Stefano Comini | Audi RS3 LMS TCR | (Belgium) Comtoyou Racing | 1:26.036 | 1:26.103 | 6 | |
| 9 | 10 | (Italy) Gianni Morbidelli | Volkswagen Golf GTI TCR | (Sweden) WestCoast Racing | 1:26.366 | 1:26.117 | 7 | |
| 10 | 5 | (Italy) Roberto Colciago | Honda Civic Type-R TCR | (Hungary) M1RA | 1:25.913 | 1:26.144 | 13^{2} | |
| 11 | 17 | (United Kingdom) Daniel Lloyd | SEAT León TCR | (Hong Kong) Lukoil Craft-Bamboo Racing | 1:25.984 | 1:26.232 | 8 | |
| 12 | 6 | (Belgium) Frédéric Vervisch | Audi RS3 LMS TCR | (Belgium) Comtoyou Racing | 1:26.341 | 1:26.893 | 9 | |
| 13 | 2 | (France) Jean-Karl Vernay | Volkswagen Golf GTI TCR | (Luxembourg) Leopard Racing Team WRT | 1:26.578 | | 10 | |
| 14 | 16 | (Georgia (country)) Davit Kajaia | Alfa Romeo Giulietta TCR | (Georgia (country)) GE-Force | 1:26.633^{3} | | 11 | |
| 15 | 11 | (Denmark) Jens Reno Møller | Honda Civic Type-R TCR | (Denmark) Reno Racing | 1:26.678 | | 12 | |
| 16 | 34 | (Norway) Stian Paulsen | SEAT León TCR | (Norway) Stian Paulsen Racing | 1:26.710 | | 14 | |
| 17 | 31 | (Serbia) Milovan Vesnić | Audi RS3 LMS TCR | (Serbia) ASK Vesnić | 1:26.913 | | 15 | |
| 18 | 66 | (France) Grégoire Demoustier | Opel Astra TCR | (Belgium) DG Sport Compétition | 1:26.930 | | 16 | |
| 19 | 21 | (Italy) Giacomo Altoè | Volkswagen Golf GTI TCR | (Sweden) WestCoast Racing | 1:27.226 | | 17 | |
| 20 | 18 | (United States) Duncan Ende | SEAT León TCR | (United States) Icarus Motorsports | 1:27.764 | | 18 | |
| 21 | 36 | (Italy) Enrico Bettera | Audi RS3 LMS TCR | (Italy) Pit Lane Competizioni | 1:27.889 | | 19 | |
| 22 | 32 | (Italy) Luigi Ferrara | Subaru WRX STi TCR | (Italy) Top Run Motorsport | 1:28.234 | | 20 | |
| 23 | 55 | (Hungary) Ferenc Ficza | SEAT León TCR | (Hungary) Zengő Motorsport | No time | | | |

Notes

- ^1 — Attila Tassi and Robert Huff was sent to the back of the grid for Race 1, after an engine change. Which in Tassi case was a car change after his big crash in the Friday test session.
- ^2 — Roberto Colciago was given a 5 place grid penalty after the Monza round, for a collision with Maťo Homola in Race 2. However, since Attila Tassi and Robert Huff had to start from the back of the grid for the same race, Colciago started from 13th position instead of 15th.
- ^3 — Davit Kajaia had his best laptime deleted during Q1, after improving his sector and laptime during yellow flags.

=== Race 1 ===
| Pos. | No. | Driver | Car | Team | Laps | Time/Retired | Grid | Points |
|---|---|---|---|---|---|---|---|---|
| 1 | 62 | (Serbia) Dušan Borković | Alfa Romeo Giulietta TCR | (Georgia (country)) GE-Force | 14 | 24:50.968 | 2 | 25 |
| 2 | 70 | (Slovakia) Maťo Homola | Opel Astra TCR | (Belgium) DG Sport Compétition | 14 | +0.873 | 1 | 18 |
| 3 | 1 | (Switzerland) Stefano Comini | Audi RS3 LMS TCR | (Belgium) Comtoyou Racing | 14 | +1.465 | 6 | 15 |
| 4 | 35 | (Austria) Thomas Jäger | Opel Astra TCR | (Germany) Kissling Motorsport | 14 | +1.964 | 4 | 12 |
| 5 | 74 | (Spain) Pepe Oriola | SEAT León TCR | (Hong Kong) Lukoil Craft-Bamboo Racing | 14 | +2.638 | 3 | 10 |
| 6 | 54 | (United Kingdom) James Nash | SEAT León TCR | (Hong Kong) Lukoil Craft-Bamboo Racing | 14 | +3.098 | 5 | 8 |
| 7 | 16 | (Georgia (country)) Davit Kajaia | Alfa Romeo Giulietta TCR | (Georgia (country)) GE-Force | 14 | +4.006 | 11 | 6 |
| 8 | 11 | (Denmark) Jens Reno Møller | Honda Civic Type-R TCR | (Denmark) Reno Racing | 14 | +4.631 | 12 | 4 |
| 9 | 9 | (Hungary) Attila Tassi | Honda Civic Type-R TCR | (Hungary) M1RA | 14 | +4.855 | 20 | 2 |
| 10 | 6 | (Belgium) Frédéric Vervisch | Audi RS3 LMS TCR | (Belgium) Comtoyou Racing | 14 | +5.373 | 9 | 1 |
| 11 | 17 | (United Kingdom) Daniel Lloyd | SEAT León TCR | (Hong Kong) Lukoil Craft-Bamboo Racing | 14 | +5.556 | 8 | |
| 12 | 5 | (Italy) Roberto Colciago | Honda Civic Type-R TCR | (Hungary) M1RA | 14 | +5.995 | 13 | |
| 13 | 10 | (Italy) Gianni Morbidelli | Volkswagen Golf GTI TCR | (Sweden) WestCoast Racing | 14 | +6.753 | 7 | |
| 14 | 66 | (France) Grégoire Demoustier | Opel Astra TCR | (Belgium) DG Sport Compétition | 14 | +7.825 | 16 | |
| 15 | 21 | (Italy) Giacomo Altoè | Volkswagen Golf GTI TCR | (Sweden) WestCoast Racing | 14 | +8.626 | 17 | |
| 16 | 36 | (Italy) Enrico Bettera | Audi RS3 LMS TCR | (Italy) Pit Lane Competizioni | 14 | +10.834 | 19 | |
| 17 | 2 | (France) Jean-Karl Vernay | Volkswagen Golf GTI TCR | (Luxembourg) Leopard Racing Team WRT | 13 | Accident | 10 | |
| 18 | 18 | (United States) Duncan Ende | SEAT León TCR | (United States) Icarus Motorsports | 11 | Driveshaft | 18 | |
| Ret | 34 | (Norway) Stian Paulsen | SEAT León TCR | (Norway) Stian Paulsen Racing | 8 | Collision | 14 | |
| Ret | 3 | (United Kingdom) Robert Huff | Volkswagen Golf GTI TCR | (Luxembourg) Leopard Racing Team WRT | 7 | Accident | 21 | |
| Ret | 31 | (Serbia) Milovan Vesnić | Audi RS3 LMS TCR | (Serbia) ASK Vesnić | 7 | Collision | 15 | |
| DNS | 32 | (Italy) Luigi Ferrara | Subaru WRX STi TCR | (Italy) Top Run Motorsport | | Technical | | |
| WD | 55 | (Hungary) Ferenc Ficza | SEAT León TCR | (Hungary) Zengő Motorsport | | Accident | | |

=== Race 2 ===
| Pos. | No. | Driver | Car | Team | Laps | Time/Retired | Grid | Points |
|---|---|---|---|---|---|---|---|---|
| 1 | 5 | (Italy) Roberto Colciago | Honda Civic Type-R TCR | (Hungary) M1RA | 17 | 27:50.474 | 1 | 25 |
| 2 | 9 | (Hungary) Attila Tassi | Honda Civic Type-R TCR | (Hungary) M1RA | 17 | +1.267 | 6 | 18 |
| 3 | 1 | (Switzerland) Stefano Comini | Audi RS3 LMS TCR | (Belgium) Comtoyou Racing | 17 | +1.503 | 3 | 15 |
| 4 | 35 | (Austria) Thomas Jäger | Opel Astra TCR | (Germany) Kissling Motorsport | 17 | +1.945 | 5 | 12 |
| 5 | 10 | (Italy) Gianni Morbidelli | Volkswagen Golf GTI TCR | (Sweden) WestCoast Racing | 17 | +2.453 | 2 | 10 |
| 6 | 54 | (United Kingdom) James Nash | SEAT León TCR | (Hong Kong) Lukoil Craft-Bamboo Racing | 17 | +2.815 | 4 | 8 |
| 7 | 17 | (United Kingdom) Daniel Lloyd | SEAT León TCR | (Hong Kong) Lukoil Craft-Bamboo Racing | 17 | +6.777 | 10 | 6 |
| 8 | 21 | (Italy) Giacomo Altoè | Volkswagen Golf GTI TCR | (Sweden) WestCoast Racing | 17 | +7.436 | 16 | 4 |
| 9 | 11 | (Denmark) Jens Reno Møller | Honda Civic Type-R TCR | (Denmark) Reno Racing | 17 | +8.337 | 13 | 2 |
| 10 | 70 | (Slovakia) Maťo Homola | Opel Astra TCR | (Belgium) DG Sport Compétition | 17 | +9.431 | 9 | 1 |
| 11 | 16 | (Georgia (country)) Davit Kajaia | Alfa Romeo Giulietta TCR | (Georgia (country)) GE-Force | 16 | +1 lap | 12 | |
| 12 | 36 | (Italy) Enrico Bettera | Audi RS3 LMS TCR | (Italy) Pit Lane Competizioni | 16 | +1 lap | 18 | |
| Ret | 6 | (Belgium) Frédéric Vervisch | Audi RS3 LMS TCR | (Belgium) Comtoyou Racing | 12 | Technical | 11 | |
| Ret | 66 | (France) Grégoire Demoustier | Opel Astra TCR | (Belgium) DG Sport Compétition | 11 | Technical | 15 | |
| Ret | 74 | (Spain) Pepe Oriola | SEAT León TCR | (Hong Kong) Lukoil Craft-Bamboo Racing | 10 | Puncture | 7 | |
| Ret | 18 | (United States) Duncan Ende | SEAT León TCR | (United States) Icarus Motorsports | 9 | Puncture | 17 | |
| Ret | 62 | (Serbia) Dušan Borković | Alfa Romeo Giulietta TCR | (Georgia (country)) GE-Force | 5 | Driveshaft | 8 | |
| Ret | 34 | (Norway) Stian Paulsen | SEAT León TCR | (Norway) Stian Paulsen Racing | 4 | Technical | 14 | |
| DNS | 2 | (France) Jean-Karl Vernay | Volkswagen Golf GTI TCR | (Luxembourg) Leopard Racing Team WRT | | Accident | | |
| DNS | 3 | (United Kingdom) Robert Huff | Volkswagen Golf GTI TCR | (Luxembourg) Leopard Racing Team WRT | | Accident | | |
| DNS | 31 | (Serbia) Milovan Vesnić | Audi RS3 LMS TCR | (Serbia) ASK Vesnić | | Collision | | |
| DNS | 32 | (Italy) Luigi Ferrara | Subaru WRX STi TCR | (Italy) Top Run Motorsport | | Technical | | |
| WD | 55 | (Hungary) Ferenc Ficza | SEAT León TCR | (Hungary) Zengő Motorsport | | Accident | | |

== Standings after the event ==
Drivers' Championship standings

| | Pos | Driver | Points |
|---|---|---|---|
| 2 | 1 | (Switzerland) Stefano Comini | 125 |
| | 2 | (Italy) Roberto Colciago | 122 |
| 2 | 3 | (France) Jean-Karl Vernay | 113 |
| | 4 | (Hungary) Attila Tassi | 98 |
| 1 | 5 | (Serbia) Dušan Borković | 82 |

Model of the Year standings

| | Pos | Car | Points |
|---|---|---|---|
| | 1 | Honda Civic Type-R TCR | 267 |
| | 2 | SEAT León TCR | 213 |
| 1 | 3 | Audi RS3 LMS TCR | 186 |
| 1 | 4 | Volkswagen Golf GTI TCR | 174 |
| | 5 | Alfa Romeo Giulietta TCR | 148 |

Teams' Championship standings

| | Pos | Driver | Points |
|---|---|---|---|
| | 1 | (Hungary) M1RA | 222 |
| 1 | 2 | (Hong Kong) Lukoil Craft-Bamboo Racing | 183 |
| 1 | 3 | (Belgium) Comtoyou Racing | 182 |
| 1 | 4 | (Georgia (country)) GE-Force | 141 |
| 1 | 5 | (Luxembourg) Leopard Racing Team WRT | 140 |

- Note: Only the top five positions are included for both sets of drivers' standings.
