= 2017 TCR International Series Sakhir round =

(Bahrain) 2017 TCR International Series Sakhir round
Round details
- Round 2 of 10 rounds in the 2017 TCR International Series
- Layout of the Bahrain International Circuit
- Location: Bahrain International Circuit, Sakhir, Bahrain
- Course: Permanent racing facility 5.412 km (3.363 mi)

TCR International Series

Race 1
- Date: 15 April 2017
- Laps: 9

Pole position
Driver	(Slovakia) Maťo Homola	DG Sport Compétition
- Time: 2:12.073

Podium
First	(Italy) Roberto Colciago	M1RA
Second	(France) Hugo Valente	Lukoil Craft-Bamboo Racing
Third	(France) Jean-Karl Vernay	Leopard Racing Team WRT

Fastest lap
Driver	(Georgia (country)) Davit Kajaia	GE-Force
- Time: 2:13.635 (on lap 2)

Race 2
- Date: 16 April 2017
- Laps: 9

Podium
First	(Serbia) Dušan Borković	GE-Force
Second	(United Kingdom) James Nash	Lukoil Craft-Bamboo Racing
Third	(France) Hugo Valente	Lukoil Craft-Bamboo Racing

Fastest lap
Driver	(Serbia) Dušan Borković	GE-Force
- Time: 2:13.476 (on lap 2)

The 2017 TCR International Series Sakhir round was the second round of the 2017 TCR International Series season. It took place on 15–16 April at the Bahrain International Circuit.

Roberto Colciago won the first race starting from third position, driving a Honda Civic Type-R TCR, and Dušan Borković gained the second one, driving an Alfa Romeo Giulietta TCR.

== Ballast ==
Due to the results obtained in the previous round, Davit Kajaia received +30 kg, Attila Tassi +20 kg and Pepe Oriola +10 kg.

A last minute BOP adjustment was announced after qualifying, meaning the Opel Astra TCRs engine power was adjusted down from 100% to 95%. Both the Audi RS3 LMS TCRs and SEAT León TCRs using a DSG gearbox was given -10mm in ride height, running at 70mm from the minimum 80mm in ride height.

== Classification ==
=== Qualifying ===
Pos.	No.	Driver	Car	Team	Q1	Q2	Grid	Points
1	70	(Slovakia) Maťo Homola	Opel Astra TCR	(Belgium) DG Sport Compétition	2:12.149	2:12.073	16^{1}	5
2	23	(Belgium) Pierre-Yves Corthals	Opel Astra TCR	(Belgium) DG Sport Compétition	2:11.903	2:12.451	1	4
3	7	(France) Hugo Valente	SEAT León TCR	(Hong Kong) Lukoil Craft-Bamboo Racing	2:13.291	2:12.656	2	3
4	5	(Italy) Roberto Colciago	Honda Civic Type-R TCR	(Hungary) M1RA	2:12.956	2:12.672	3	2
5	16	(Georgia (country)) Davit Kajaia	Alfa Romeo Giulietta TCR	(Georgia (country)) GE-Force	2:14.365	2:12.877	4	1
6	2	(France) Jean-Karl Vernay	Volkswagen Golf GTI TCR	(Luxembourg) Leopard Racing Team WRT	2:13.223	2:12.896	5	
7	54	(United Kingdom) James Nash	SEAT León TCR	(Hong Kong) Lukoil Craft-Bamboo Racing	2:13.374	2:12.945	6	
8	9	(Hungary) Attila Tassi	Honda Civic Type-R TCR	(Hungary) M1RA	2:13.297	2:13.032	7	
9	62	(Serbia) Dušan Borković	Alfa Romeo Giulietta TCR	(Georgia (country)) GE-Force	2:13.273	2:13.056	8	
10	55	(Hungary) Ferenc Ficza	SEAT León TCR	(Austria) Zele Racing	2:13.356	2:13.118	9	
11	10	(Italy) Gianni Morbidelli	Volkswagen Golf GTI TCR	(Sweden) WestCoast Racing	2:13.936	2:13.253	10	
12	74	(Spain) Pepe Oriola	SEAT León TCR	(Hong Kong) Lukoil Craft-Bamboo Racing	2:14.000	2:13.273	11	
13	21	(Italy) Giacomo Altoè	Volkswagen Golf GTI TCR	(Sweden) WestCoast Racing	2:13.953^{2}		14	
14	1	(Switzerland) Stefano Comini	Audi RS3 LMS TCR	(Belgium) Comtoyou Racing	2:14.751		12	
15	88	(Italy) Michela Cerruti	Alfa Romeo Giulietta TCR	(Georgia (country)) GE-Force	2:14.780		13	
16	18	(United States) Duncan Ende	SEAT León TCR	(United States) Icarus Motorsports	2:17.074		15	

Notes

- ^1 — Maťo Homola was sent to the back of the grid for Race 1, after an engine change after FP1.
- ^2 — Giacomo Altoè had his best laptime deleted during Q1 and therefore did not qualify for Q2. However, after qualifying, the stewards reversed this decision and Altoès best laptime was reinstated.

=== Race 1 ===
Pos.	No.	Driver	Car	Team	Laps	Time/Retired	Grid	Points
1	5	(Italy) Roberto Colciago	Honda Civic Type-R TCR	(Hungary) M1RA	9	20:15.241	3	25
2	7	(France) Hugo Valente	SEAT León TCR	(Hong Kong) Lukoil Craft-Bamboo Racing	9	+5.502	2	18
3	2	(France) Jean-Karl Vernay	Volkswagen Golf GTI TCR	(Luxembourg) Leopard Racing Team WRT	9	+7.637	5	15
4	62	(Serbia) Dušan Borković	Alfa Romeo Giulietta TCR	(Georgia (country)) GE-Force	9	+8.763	8	12
5	23	(Belgium) Pierre-Yves Corthals	Opel Astra TCR	(Belgium) DG Sport Compétition	9	+9.661	1	10
6	74	(Spain) Pepe Oriola	SEAT León TCR	(Hong Kong) Lukoil Craft-Bamboo Racing	9	+9.912	11	8
7	54	(United Kingdom) James Nash	SEAT León TCR	(Hong Kong) Lukoil Craft-Bamboo Racing	9	+11.284	6	6
8	1	(Switzerland) Stefano Comini	Audi RS3 LMS TCR	(Belgium) Comtoyou Racing	9	+11.581	12	4
9	10	(Italy) Gianni Morbidelli	Volkswagen Golf GTI TCR	(Sweden) WestCoast Racing	9	+12.200	10	2
10	21	(Italy) Giacomo Altoè	Volkswagen Golf GTI TCR	(Sweden) WestCoast Racing	9	+19.061	14	1
11	55	(Hungary) Ferenc Ficza	SEAT León TCR	(Austria) Zele Racing	9	+20.396	9	
12	9	(Hungary) Attila Tassi	Honda Civic Type-R TCR	(Hungary) M1RA	9	+21.870	7	
13	70	(Slovakia) Maťo Homola	Opel Astra TCR	(Belgium) DG Sport Compétition	9	+21.918	16	
14	88	(Italy) Michela Cerruti	Alfa Romeo Giulietta TCR	(Georgia (country)) GE-Force	9	+24.481	13	
15	18	(United States) Duncan Ende	SEAT León TCR	(United States) Icarus Motorsports	6	Technical	15	
16	16	(Georgia (country)) Davit Kajaia	Alfa Romeo Giulietta TCR	(Georgia (country)) GE-Force	2	Drivesharft	4	

=== Race 2 ===
Pos.	No.	Driver	Car	Team	Laps	Time/Retired	Grid	Points
1	62	(Serbia) Dušan Borković	Alfa Romeo Giulietta TCR	(Georgia (country)) GE-Force	9	20:20.221	2	25
2	54	(United Kingdom) James Nash	SEAT León TCR	(Hong Kong) Lukoil Craft-Bamboo Racing	9	+4.154	4	18
3	7	(France) Hugo Valente	SEAT León TCR	(Hong Kong) Lukoil Craft-Bamboo Racing	9	+4.861	8	15
4	2	(France) Jean-Karl Vernay	Volkswagen Golf GTI TCR	(Luxembourg) Leopard Racing Team WRT	9	+5.391	5	12
5	5	(Italy) Roberto Colciago	Honda Civic Type-R TCR	(Hungary) M1RA	9	+5.690	7	10
6	55	(Hungary) Ferenc Ficza	SEAT León TCR	(Austria) Zele Racing	9	+9.161	1	8
7	74	(Spain) Pepe Oriola	SEAT León TCR	(Hong Kong) Lukoil Craft-Bamboo Racing	9	+14.967	12	6
8	9	(Hungary) Attila Tassi	Honda Civic Type-R TCR	(Hungary) M1RA	9	+15.154	3	4
9	1	(Switzerland) Stefano Comini	Audi RS3 LMS TCR	(Belgium) Comtoyou Racing	9	+15.261	13	2
10	10	(Italy) Gianni Morbidelli	Volkswagen Golf GTI TCR	(Sweden) WestCoast Racing	9	+16.525	11	1
11	23	(Belgium) Pierre-Yves Corthals	Opel Astra TCR	(Belgium) DG Sport Compétition	9	+17.494	9	
12	88	(Italy) Michela Cerruti	Alfa Romeo Giulietta TCR	(Georgia (country)) GE-Force	9	+18.224	14	
13	70	(Slovakia) Maťo Homola	Opel Astra TCR	(Belgium) DG Sport Compétition	9	+22.286	10	
14	18	(United States) Duncan Ende	SEAT León TCR	(United States) Icarus Motorsports	9	+34.009	16	
NC	16	(Georgia (country)) Davit Kajaia	Alfa Romeo Giulietta TCR	(Georgia (country)) GE-Force	8	Engine	6	
Ret	21	(Italy) Giacomo Altoè	Volkswagen Golf GTI TCR	(Sweden) WestCoast Racing	1	Puncture	15	

== Standings after the event ==
Drivers' Championship standings

	Pos	Driver	Points
3	1	(France) Jean-Karl Vernay	52
5	2	(Serbia) Dušan Borković	51
5	3	(Italy) Roberto Colciago	50
1	4	(Spain) Pepe Oriola	45
4	5	(Georgia (country)) Davit Kajaia	39

Model of the Year standings

	Pos	Car	Points
	1	SEAT León TCR	91
1	2	Honda Civic Type-R TCR	76
1	3	Alfa Romeo Giulietta TCR	65
	4	Volkswagen Golf GTI TCR	54
1	5	Opel Astra TCR	25

Teams' Championship standings

	Pos	Driver	Points
1	1	(Hungary) M1RA	72
1	2	(Hong Kong) Lukoil Craft-Bamboo Racing	70
2	3	(Georgia (country)) GE-Force	65
	4	(Luxembourg) Leopard Racing Team WRT	40
	5	(Austria) Zele Racing	22

- Note: Only the top five positions are included for both sets of drivers' standings.
