= 2017 TCR International Series Zhejiang round =

Round of motorsports

(China) 2017 TCR International Series Zhejiang round
Round details
- Round 9 of 10 rounds in the 2017 TCR International Series
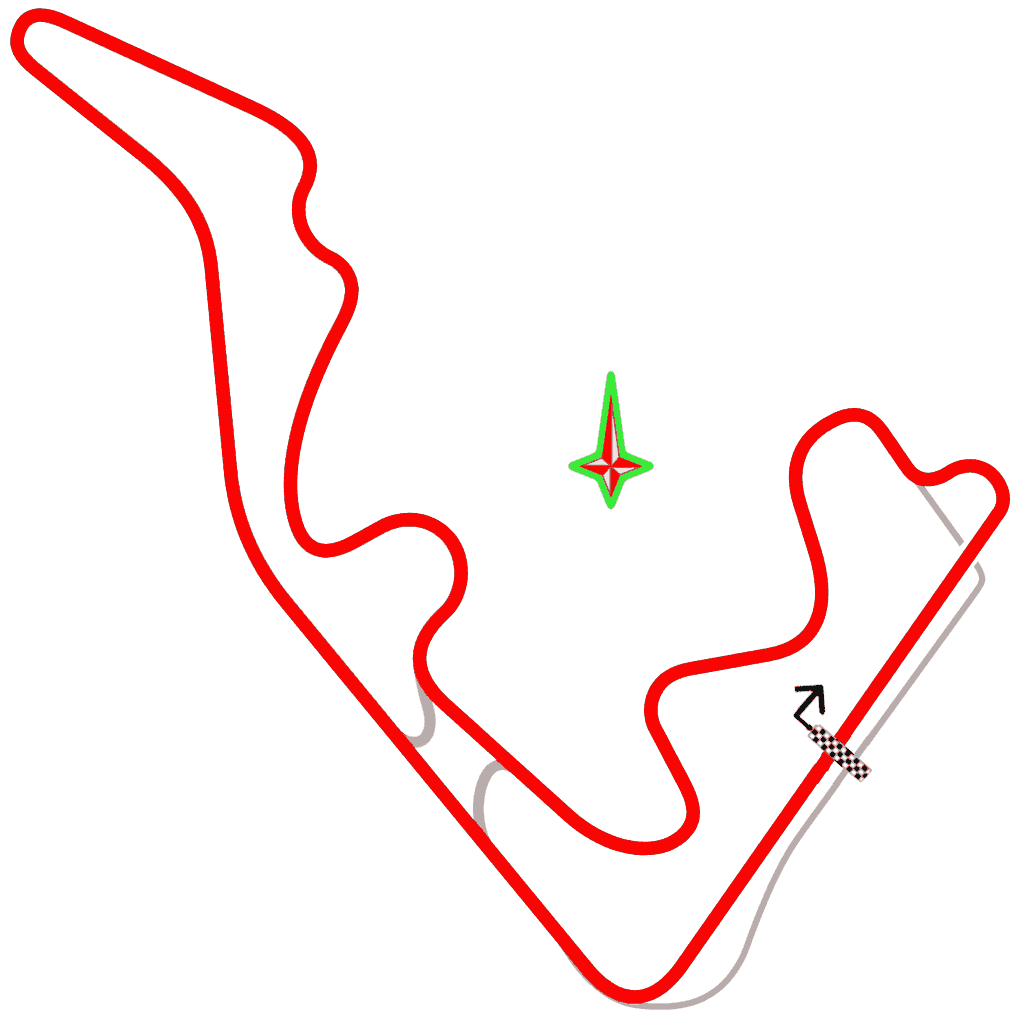
- Location: Zhejiang International Circuit, Zhejiang, China
- Course: Permanent racing facility 3.200 km (1.980 mi)

TCR International Series

Race 1
- Date: 8 October 2017
- Laps: 19

Pole position
Driver	(United Kingdom) Robert Huff	Leopard Racing Team WRT
- Time: 1:33.173

Podium
First	(Italy) Gabriele Tarquini	BRC Racing Team
Second	(France) Jean-Karl Vernay	Leopard Racing Team WRT
Third	(United Kingdom) Robert Huff	Leopard Racing Team WRT

Fastest lap
Driver	(Italy) Gabriele Tarquini	BRC Racing Team
- Time: 1:33.924 (on lap 3)

Race 2
- Date: 8 October 2017
- Laps: 19

Podium
First	(United Kingdom) Robert Huff	Leopard Racing Team WRT
Second	(Italy) Gianni Morbidelli	WestCoast Racing
Third	(United Kingdom) James Nash	Lukoil Craft-Bamboo Racing

Fastest lap
Driver	(Italy) Gianni Morbidelli	WestCoast Racing
- Time: 1:34.111 (on lap 12)

The 2017 TCR International Series Zhejiang round was the ninth round of the 2017 TCR International Series season. It took place on 8 October at the Zhejiang International Circuit.

Gabriele Tarquini won the first race starting from fourteenth position, driving a Hyundai i30 N TCR and Robert Huff gained the second one, starting from tenth position, driving a Volkswagen Golf GTI TCR.

== Ballast ==
Due to the results obtained in the previous round, Attila Tassi and Norbert Michelisz both received +30 kg, while both Giacomo Altoè and Dušan Borković received +10 kg. However, since neither Norbert Michelisz nor Giacomo Altoè took part, they didn't take ballast at this event.

The Balance of Performance was also adjusted for this event, meaning the Opel Astra TCRs was given a +30 kg of additional weight. While the new Hyundai i30 N TCRs was allowed to run at its minimum weight of 1285 kg. However, following Race 1. The Hyundai's was given a +40 kg of additional weight, as well as having their engine power reduced from a 100% to 95%.

== Classification ==
=== Qualifying ===
Pos.	No.	Driver	Car	Team	Q1	Q2	Grid	Points
1	3	(United Kingdom) Robert Huff	Volkswagen Golf GTI TCR	(Luxembourg) Leopard Racing Team WRT	1:33.503	1:33.173	1	5
2	2	(France) Jean-Karl Vernay	Volkswagen Golf GTI TCR	(Luxembourg) Leopard Racing Team WRT	1:33.476	1:33.341	2	4
3	74	(Spain) Pepe Oriola	SEAT León TCR	(Hong Kong) Lukoil Craft-Bamboo Racing	1:34.266	1:33.486	3	3
4	10	(Italy) Gianni Morbidelli	Volkswagen Golf GTI TCR	(Sweden) WestCoast Racing	1:33.279	1:33.804	4	2
5	17	(United Kingdom) Daniel Lloyd	SEAT León TCR	(Hong Kong) Lukoil Craft-Bamboo Racing	1:33.893	1:33.817	5	1
6	5	(Italy) Roberto Colciago	Honda Civic Type-R TCR	(Hungary) M1RA	1:33.877	1:34.088	6	
7	9	(Hungary) Attila Tassi	Honda Civic Type-R TCR	(Hungary) M1RA	1:33.786	1:34.143	7	
8	54	(United Kingdom) James Nash	SEAT León TCR	(Hong Kong) Lukoil Craft-Bamboo Racing	1:34.085	1:34.158	8	
9	16	(Georgia (country)) Davit Kajaia	Alfa Romeo Giulietta TCR	(Georgia (country)) GE-Force	1:34.374	1:34.170	9	
10	6	(Belgium) Frédéric Vervisch	Audi RS3 LMS TCR	(Belgium) Comtoyou Racing	1:34.539	1:34.494	10	
11	4	(Belgium) Denis Dupont	SEAT León TCR	(Belgium) Comtoyou Racing	1:34.508	1:34.809	11	
12	28	(France) Aurélien Panis	Honda Civic Type-R TCR	(Belgium) Boutsen Ginion Racing	1:34.515	1:34.929	12	
13	33	(Switzerland) Alain Menu	Hyundai i30 N TCR	(Italy) BRC Racing Team	1:32.811^{1}		13	
14	30	(Italy) Gabriele Tarquini	Hyundai i30 N TCR	(Italy) BRC Racing Team	1:32.935^{1}		14	
15	62	(Serbia) Dušan Borković	Alfa Romeo Giulietta TCR	(Georgia (country)) GE-Force	1:34.651		15	
16	1	(Switzerland) Stefano Comini	Audi RS3 LMS TCR	(Belgium) Comtoyou Racing	1:34.856		16	
17	81	(China) Zhendong Zhang	Audi RS3 LMS TCR	(China) ZZZ Team	1:34.872		17	
18	18	(United States) Duncan Ende	SEAT León TCR	(United States) Icarus Motorsports	1:36.328		18	
19	99	(France) Rafaël Galiana	Volkswagen Golf GTI TCR	(Sweden) WestCoast Racing	1:36.496		19	
20	71	(China) Tengyi Jiang	Audi RS3 LMS TCR	(China) ZZZ Team	No time^{2}		20	
21	70	(Slovakia) Maťo Homola	Opel Astra TCR	(Belgium) DG Sport Compétition	No time		21	

Notes

- ^1 — Alain Menu and Gabriele Tarquini, who had qualified first and second in Q1. Was not allowed to take part in Q2, because their Hyundai i30 N TCRs are running on a temporary homologation, which means that they are not eligible for points.
- ^2 — Tengyi Jiang had his times from Q1 deleted, after the team broke the parc fermé rules.

=== Race 1 ===
Pos.	No.	Driver	Car	Team	Laps	Time/Retired	Grid	Points
1	30	(Italy) Gabriele Tarquini	Hyundai i30 N TCR	(Italy) BRC Racing Team	19	30:15.966	14	
2	2	(France) Jean-Karl Vernay	Volkswagen Golf GTI TCR	(Luxembourg) Leopard Racing Team WRT	19	+1.626	2	25
3	3	(United Kingdom) Robert Huff	Volkswagen Golf GTI TCR	(Luxembourg) Leopard Racing Team WRT	19	+1.970	1	18
4	10	(Italy) Gianni Morbidelli	Volkswagen Golf GTI TCR	(Sweden) WestCoast Racing	19	+3.016	4	15
5	74	(Spain) Pepe Oriola	SEAT León TCR	(Hong Kong) Lukoil Craft-Bamboo Racing	19	+7.035	3	12
6	6	(Belgium) Frédéric Vervisch	Audi RS3 LMS TCR	(Belgium) Comtoyou Racing	19	+11.787	10	10
7	5	(Italy) Roberto Colciago	Honda Civic Type-R TCR	(Hungary) M1RA	19	+15.380	6	8
8	16	(Georgia (country)) Davit Kajaia	Alfa Romeo Giulietta TCR	(Georgia (country)) GE-Force	19	+16.972	9	6
9	54	(United Kingdom) James Nash	SEAT León TCR	(Hong Kong) Lukoil Craft-Bamboo Racing	19	+19.028	8	4
10	28	(France) Aurélien Panis	Honda Civic Type-R TCR	(Belgium) Boutsen Ginion Racing	19	+19.679	12	2
11	9	(Hungary) Attila Tassi	Honda Civic Type-R TCR	(Hungary) M1RA	19	+20.201	7	1
12	33	(Switzerland) Alain Menu	Hyundai i30 N TCR	(Italy) BRC Racing Team	19	+20.983	13	
13	1	(Switzerland) Stefano Comini	Audi RS3 LMS TCR	(Belgium) Comtoyou Racing	19	+29.285	16	
14	81	(China) Zhendong Zhang	Audi RS3 LMS TCR	(China) ZZZ Team	19	+42.452^{3}	17	
15	99	(France) Rafaël Galiana	Volkswagen Golf GTI TCR	(Sweden) WestCoast Racing	19	+50.245	19	
16	71	(China) Tengyi Jiang	Audi RS3 LMS TCR	(China) ZZZ Team	19	+1:01.357	20	
17	18	(United States) Duncan Ende	SEAT León TCR	(United States) Icarus Motorsports	19	+1:01.735	18	
Ret	70	(Slovakia) Maťo Homola	Opel Astra TCR	(Belgium) DG Sport Compétition	11	Puncture	21	
Ret	62	(Serbia) Dušan Borković	Alfa Romeo Giulietta TCR	(Georgia (country)) GE-Force	3	Radiator	15	
Ret	17	(United Kingdom) Daniel Lloyd	SEAT León TCR	(Hong Kong) Lukoil Craft-Bamboo Racing	2	Technical	5	
Ret	4	(Belgium) Denis Dupont	SEAT León TCR	(Belgium) Comtoyou Racing	0	Collision	11	

Notes

- ^3 — Zhendong Zhang was given a 10 second time penalty, for causing a collision with Maťo Homola.

=== Race 2 ===
Pos.	No.	Driver	Car	Team	Laps	Time/Retired	Grid	Points
1	3	(United Kingdom) Robert Huff	Volkswagen Golf GTI TCR	(Luxembourg) Leopard Racing Team WRT	19	30:23.840	10	25
2	10	(Italy) Gianni Morbidelli	Volkswagen Golf GTI TCR	(Sweden) WestCoast Racing	19	+2.403	7	18
3	54	(United Kingdom) James Nash	SEAT León TCR	(Hong Kong) Lukoil Craft-Bamboo Racing	19	+3.511	3	15
4	33	(Switzerland) Alain Menu	Hyundai i30 N TCR	(Italy) BRC Racing Team	19	+23.435	12	
5	74	(Spain) Pepe Oriola	SEAT León TCR	(Hong Kong) Lukoil Craft-Bamboo Racing	19	+24.206	8	12
6	30	(Italy) Gabriele Tarquini	Hyundai i30 N TCR	(Italy) BRC Racing Team	19	+24.668	13	
7	81	(China) Zhendong Zhang	Audi RS3 LMS TCR	(China) ZZZ Team	19	+25.442	16	10
8	5	(Italy) Roberto Colciago	Honda Civic Type-R TCR	(Hungary) M1RA	19	+26.902	5	8
9	9	(Hungary) Attila Tassi	Honda Civic Type-R TCR	(Hungary) M1RA	19	+36.852	4	6
10	99	(France) Rafaël Galiana	Volkswagen Golf GTI TCR	(Sweden) WestCoast Racing	19	+50.687	18	4
11	18	(United States) Duncan Ende	SEAT León TCR	(United States) Icarus Motorsports	19	+1:09.015	17	2
12	2	(France) Jean-Karl Vernay	Volkswagen Golf GTI TCR	(Luxembourg) Leopard Racing Team WRT	18	+1 lap	9	1
13	28	(France) Aurélien Panis	Honda Civic Type-R TCR	(Belgium) Boutsen Ginion Racing	15	Technical	11	
Ret	6	(Belgium) Frédéric Vervisch	Audi RS3 LMS TCR	(Belgium) Comtoyou Racing	13	Collision	1	
Ret	71	(China) Tengyi Jiang	Audi RS3 LMS TCR	(China) ZZZ Team	10	Technical	19	
Ret	1	(Switzerland) Stefano Comini	Audi RS3 LMS TCR	(Belgium) Comtoyou Racing	4	Collision	15	
Ret	16	(Georgia (country)) Davit Kajaia	Alfa Romeo Giulietta TCR	(Georgia (country)) GE-Force	3	Collision	2	
Ret	70	(Slovakia) Maťo Homola	Opel Astra TCR	(Belgium) DG Sport Compétition	3	Radiator	20	
DNS	62	(Serbia) Dušan Borković	Alfa Romeo Giulietta TCR	(Georgia (country)) GE-Force		Radiator	14	
DNS	17	(United Kingdom) Daniel Lloyd	SEAT León TCR	(Hong Kong) Lukoil Craft-Bamboo Racing		Technical	6	
DNS	4	(Belgium) Denis Dupont	SEAT León TCR	(Belgium) Comtoyou Racing		Collision	21^{4}	

Notes

- ^4 — Denis Dupont was sent to the back of the grid for Race 2, after his car was taken out of parc fermé, after Race 1.

== Standings after the event ==
Drivers' Championship standings

	Pos	Driver	Points
1	1	(France) Jean-Karl Vernay	207
1	2	(Hungary) Attila Tassi	186
	3	(Switzerland) Stefano Comini	165
	4	(Italy) Roberto Colciago	161
	5	(Spain) Pepe Oriola	137

Model of the Year standings

Pos	Car	Points
1	Honda Civic Type-R TCR	480
2	Volkswagen Golf GTI TCR	450
3	SEAT León TCR	388
4	Audi RS3 LMS TCR	277
5	Alfa Romeo Giulietta TCR	197

Teams' Championship standings

Pos	Driver	Points
1	(Hungary) M1RA	405
2	(Hong Kong) Lukoil Craft-Bamboo Racing	336
3	(Luxembourg) Leopard Racing Team WRT	325
4	(Belgium) Comtoyou Racing	246
5	(Georgia (country)) GE-Force	183

- Note: Only the top five positions are included for both sets of drivers' standings.
