= 2017 TCR International Series Monza round =

(Italy) 2017 TCR International Series Monza round
Round details
- Round 4 of 10 rounds in the 2017 TCR International Series
- Layout of the Autodromo Nazionale Monza
- Location: Autodromo Nazionale Monza, Monza, Italy
- Course: Permanent racing facility 5.793 km (3.600 mi)

TCR International Series

Race 1
- Date: 13 May 2017
- Laps: 11

Pole position
Driver	(Belgium) Frédéric Vervisch	Comtoyou Racing
- Time: 1:58.997

Podium
First	(Italy) Roberto Colciago	M1RA
Second	(Hungary) Attila Tassi	M1RA
Third	(Spain) Pepe Oriola	Lukoil Craft-Bamboo Racing

Fastest lap
Driver	(Belgium) Frédéric Vervisch	Comtoyou Racing
- Time: 2:00.106 (on lap 7)

Race 2
- Date: 14 May 2017
- Laps: 11

Podium
First	(Switzerland) Stefano Comini	Comtoyou Racing
Second	(Italy) Roberto Colciago	M1RA
Third	(Belgium) Frédéric Vervisch	Comtoyou Racing

Fastest lap
Driver	(Hungary) Attila Tassi	M1RA
- Time: 1:59.958 (on lap 5)

The 2017 TCR International Series Monza round was the fourth round of the 2017 TCR International Series season. It took place on 13–14 May at the Autodromo Nazionale Monza.

Roberto Colciago won the first race starting from second position, driving a Honda Civic Type-R TCR, and Stefano Comini gained the second one, driving an Audi RS3 LMS TCR.

== Ballast ==
Due to the results obtained in the previous round, Stefano Comini received +30 kg, Jean-Karl Vernay received +20 kg and Benjamin Lessennes received +10 kg. Nevertheless, Lessennes didn't take part at this event, so he didn't take the ballast.

== Classification ==
=== Qualifying ===
Pos.	No.	Driver	Car	Team	Q1	Q2	Grid	Points
1	6	(Belgium) Frédéric Vervisch	Audi RS3 LMS TCR	(Belgium) Comtoyou Racing	2:00.021	1:58.997	1	5
2	5	(Italy) Roberto Colciago	Honda Civic Type-R TCR	(Hungary) M1RA	1:59.601	1:59.097	2	4
3	9	(Hungary) Attila Tassi	Honda Civic Type-R TCR	(Hungary) M1RA	1:59.610	1:59.131	3	3
4	16	(Georgia (country)) Davit Kajaia	Alfa Romeo Giulietta TCR	(Georgia (country)) GE-Force	2:00.180	1:59.469	4	2
5	70	(Slovakia) Maťo Homola	Opel Astra TCR	(Belgium) DG Sport Compétition	2:00.171	1:59.495	5	1
6	74	(Spain) Pepe Oriola	SEAT León TCR	(Hong Kong) Lukoil Craft-Bamboo Racing	2:00.123	1:59.737	6	
7	2	(France) Jean-Karl Vernay	Volkswagen Golf GTI TCR	(Luxembourg) Leopard Racing Team WRT	2:00.158	1:59.783	7	
8	1	(Switzerland) Stefano Comini	Audi RS3 LMS TCR	(Belgium) Comtoyou Racing	2:00.455	1:59.809	8	
9	54	(United Kingdom) James Nash	SEAT León TCR	(Hong Kong) Lukoil Craft-Bamboo Racing	2:00.427	1:59.898	9	
10	7	(France) Hugo Valente	SEAT León TCR	(Hong Kong) Lukoil Craft-Bamboo Racing	2:00.254	2:00.037	10	
11	14	(Netherlands) Jaap van Lagen	Volkswagen Golf GTI TCR	(Luxembourg) Leopard Racing Team WRT	2:00.577	2:00.043	11	
12	55	(Hungary) Ferenc Ficza	SEAT León TCR	(Austria) Zele Racing	1:59.895	2:00.140	12	
13	10	(Italy) Gianni Morbidelli	Volkswagen Golf GTI TCR	(Sweden) WestCoast Racing	2:00.734		13	
14	21	(Italy) Giacomo Altoè	Volkswagen Golf GTI TCR	(Sweden) WestCoast Racing	2:00.832		14	
15	62	(Serbia) Dušan Borković	Alfa Romeo Giulietta TCR	(Georgia (country)) GE-Force	2:00.847		15	
16	23	(Belgium) Pierre-Yves Corthals	Opel Astra TCR	(Belgium) DG Sport Compétition	2:00.946		16	
17	34	(Norway) Stian Paulsen	SEAT León TCR	(Norway) Stian Paulsen Racing	2:01.654		17	
18	76	(Italy) Daniele Cappellari	SEAT León TCR	(Italy) CRC - Cappellari Reparto Corse	2:04.833		18	
19	11	(Denmark) Jens Reno Møller	Honda Civic Type-R TCR	(Denmark) Reno Racing	2:06.949		19	
20	18	(United States) Duncan Ende	SEAT León TCR	(United States) Icarus Motorsports	Withdrew			

=== Race 1 ===
Pos.	No.	Driver	Car	Team	Laps	Time/Retired	Grid	Points
1	5	(Italy) Roberto Colciago	Honda Civic Type-R TCR	(Hungary) M1RA	11	22:14.954	2	25
2	9	(Hungary) Attila Tassi	Honda Civic Type-R TCR	(Hungary) M1RA	11	+1.613	3	18
3	74	(Spain) Pepe Oriola	SEAT León TCR	(Hong Kong) Lukoil Craft-Bamboo Racing	11	+2.258	6	15
4	2	(France) Jean-Karl Vernay	Volkswagen Golf GTI TCR	(Luxembourg) Leopard Racing Team WRT	11	+2.408	7	12
5	6	(Belgium) Frédéric Vervisch	Audi RS3 LMS TCR	(Belgium) Comtoyou Racing	11	+5.881	1	10
6	7	(France) Hugo Valente	SEAT León TCR	(Hong Kong) Lukoil Craft-Bamboo Racing	11	+8.591	10	8
7	70	(Slovakia) Maťo Homola	Opel Astra TCR	(Belgium) DG Sport Compétition	11	+10.686	5	6
8	1	(Switzerland) Stefano Comini	Audi RS3 LMS TCR	(Belgium) Comtoyou Racing	11	+13.338	8	4
9	62	(Serbia) Dušan Borković	Alfa Romeo Giulietta TCR	(Georgia (country)) GE-Force	11	+14.005	15	2
10	55	(Hungary) Ferenc Ficza	SEAT León TCR	(Austria) Zele Racing	11	+15.209^{1}	12	1
11	10	(Italy) Gianni Morbidelli	Volkswagen Golf GTI TCR	(Sweden) WestCoast Racing	11	+16.893	13	
12	54	(United Kingdom) James Nash	SEAT León TCR	(Hong Kong) Lukoil Craft-Bamboo Racing	11	+20.465	9	
13	34	(Norway) Stian Paulsen	SEAT León TCR	(Norway) Stian Paulsen Racing	11	+23.128	17	
14	11	(Denmark) Jens Reno Møller	Honda Civic Type-R TCR	(Denmark) Reno Racing	11	+26.644	19	
15	76	(Italy) Daniele Cappellari	SEAT León TCR	(Italy) CRC - Cappellari Reparto Corse	11	+53.939	18	
16	16	(Georgia (country)) Davit Kajaia	Alfa Romeo Giulietta TCR	(Georgia (country)) GE-Force	9	Technical	4	
17	23	(Belgium) Pierre-Yves Corthals	Opel Astra TCR	(Belgium) DG Sport Compétition	8	Technical	16	
Ret	14	(Netherlands) Jaap van Lagen	Volkswagen Golf GTI TCR	(Luxembourg) Leopard Racing Team WRT	3	Collision	11	
Ret	21	(Italy) Giacomo Altoè	Volkswagen Golf GTI TCR	(Sweden) WestCoast Racing	0	Collision	14	
WD	18	(United States) Duncan Ende	SEAT León TCR	(United States) Icarus Motorsports		Withdrew		

Notes

- ^1 — Ferenc Ficza received a 10-second time penalty for cutting the Turn 1 chicane and gaining an unfair advantage.

=== Race 2 ===
Pos.	No.	Driver	Car	Team	Laps	Time/Retired	Grid	Points
1	1	(Switzerland) Stefano Comini	Audi RS3 LMS TCR	(Belgium) Comtoyou Racing	11	22:14.501	3	25
2	5	(Italy) Roberto Colciago	Honda Civic Type-R TCR	(Hungary) M1RA	11	+0.170	9	18
3	6	(Belgium) Frédéric Vervisch	Audi RS3 LMS TCR	(Belgium) Comtoyou Racing	11	+1.273	10	15
4	54	(United Kingdom) James Nash	SEAT León TCR	(Hong Kong) Lukoil Craft-Bamboo Racing	11	+1.797	2	12
5	2	(France) Jean-Karl Vernay	Volkswagen Golf GTI TCR	(Luxembourg) Leopard Racing Team WRT	11	+2.052	4	10
6	70	(Slovakia) Maťo Homola	Opel Astra TCR	(Belgium) DG Sport Compétition	11	+2.240	6	8
7	16	(Georgia (country)) Davit Kajaia	Alfa Romeo Giulietta TCR	(Georgia (country)) GE-Force	11	+2.269	7	6
8	74	(Spain) Pepe Oriola	SEAT León TCR	(Hong Kong) Lukoil Craft-Bamboo Racing	11	+2.789	5	4
9	9	(Hungary) Attila Tassi	Honda Civic Type-R TCR	(Hungary) M1RA	11	+3.361	8	2
10	55	(Hungary) Ferenc Ficza	SEAT León TCR	(Austria) Zele Racing	11	+3.754	12	1
11	14	(Netherlands) Jaap van Lagen	Volkswagen Golf GTI TCR	(Luxembourg) Leopard Racing Team WRT	11	+4.001	20^{2}	
12	21	(Italy) Giacomo Altoè	Volkswagen Golf GTI TCR	(Sweden) WestCoast Racing	11	+9.062	14	
13	11	(Denmark) Jens Reno Møller	Honda Civic Type-R TCR	(Denmark) Reno Racing	11	+15.510	19	
14	23	(Belgium) Pierre-Yves Corthals	Opel Astra TCR	(Belgium) DG Sport Compétition	11	+16.704	16	
15	76	(Italy) Daniele Cappellari	SEAT León TCR	(Italy) CRC - Cappellari Reparto Corse	11	+57.232	18	
16	10	(Italy) Gianni Morbidelli	Volkswagen Golf GTI TCR	(Sweden) WestCoast Racing	9	Collision	13	
Ret	34	(Norway) Stian Paulsen	SEAT León TCR	(Norway) Stian Paulsen Racing	6	Technical	17	
Ret	7	(France) Hugo Valente	SEAT León TCR	(Hong Kong) Lukoil Craft-Bamboo Racing	1	Collision	1	
Ret	62	(Serbia) Dušan Borković	Alfa Romeo Giulietta TCR	(Georgia (country)) GE-Force	1	Collision	15	
WD	18	(United States) Duncan Ende	SEAT León TCR	(United States) Icarus Motorsports		Withdrew		

- ^2 — Jaap van Lagen was sent to the back of the grid for Race 2, after an engine change after Race 1. However, due to the lateness of the penalty, his original grid position of 11th was left empty.

== Standings after the event ==
Drivers' Championship standings

	Pos	Driver	Points
	1	(France) Jean-Karl Vernay	113
3	2	(Italy) Roberto Colciago	97
1	3	(Switzerland) Stefano Comini	95
1	4	(Hungary) Attila Tassi	76
1	5	(Spain) Pepe Oriola	66

Model of the Year standings

	Pos	Car	Points
	1	Honda Civic Type-R TCR	216
	2	SEAT León TCR	178
	3	Volkswagen Golf GTI TCR	160
1	4	Audi RS3 LMS TCR	155
1	5	Alfa Romeo Giulietta TCR	112

Teams' Championship standings

	Pos	Driver	Points
2	1	(Hungary) M1RA	175
3	2	(Belgium) Comtoyou Racing	151
1	3	(Hong Kong) Lukoil Craft-Bamboo Racing	148
3	4	(Luxembourg) Leopard Racing Team WRT	140
1	5	(Georgia (country)) GE-Force	106

- Note: Only the top five positions are included for both sets of drivers' standings.
