= 2017 TCR International Series Rustavi round =

(Georgia (country)) 2017 TCR International Series Rustavi round
Round details
- Round 1 of 10 rounds in the 2017 TCR International Series
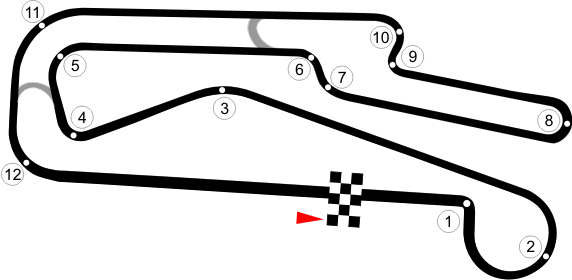
- Layout of the Rustavi International Motorpark
- Location: Rustavi International Motorpark, Tbilisi, Georgia
- Course: Permanent racing facility 4.140 km (2.572 mi)

TCR International Series

Race 1
- Date: 2 April 2017
- Laps: 15

Pole position
Driver	(Georgia (country)) Davit Kajaia	GE-Force
- Time: 1:40.693

Podium
First	(Georgia (country)) Davit Kajaia	GE-Force
Second	(Hungary) Ferenc Ficza	Zele Racing
Third	(Switzerland) Stefano Comini	Comtoyou Racing

Fastest lap
Driver	(Georgia (country)) Davit Kajaia	GE-Force
- Time: 1:49.626 (on lap 2)

Race 2
- Date: 2 April 2017
- Laps: 17

Podium
First	(Spain) Pepe Oriola	Lukoil Craft-Bamboo Racing
Second	(France) Hugo Valente	Lukoil Craft-Bamboo Racing
Third	(Hungary) Attila Tassi	M1RA

Fastest lap
Driver	(Spain) Pepe Oriola	Lukoil Craft-Bamboo Racing
- Time: 1:42.657 (on lap 10)

The 2017 TCR International Series Rustavi round was the first round of the 2017 TCR International Series season. It took place on 2 April at the Rustavi International Motorpark.

Davit Kajaia won the first race starting from pole position, driving an Alfa Romeo Giulietta TCR, and Pepe Oriola gained the second one, driving a SEAT León TCR.

== Ballast ==
After the Adria testing session, the Balance of Performance was issued: The Audi RS3 LMS TCRs were given a +45 kg from the minimum weight of 1285 kg, while the Opel Astra TCRs were given +40 kg, the SEAT León TCRs and Honda Civic TCRs were given +30 kg, the Volkswagen Golf GTI TCRs were given +10 kg and the Alfa Romeo Giulietta TCRs were given -20 kg. Both the Volkswagen Golf GTI TCRs and Alfa Romeo Giulietta TCRs were given a -10mm in ride height, running at 70mm from the minimum 80mm in ride height.

== Classification ==
=== Qualifying ===
Pos.	No.	Driver	Car	Team	Q1	Q2	Grid	Points
1	16	(Georgia (country)) Davit Kajaia	Alfa Romeo Giulietta TCR	(Georgia (country)) GE-Force	1:41.968	1:40.693	1	5
2	9	(Hungary) Attila Tassi	Honda Civic Type-R TCR	(Hungary) M1RA	1:41.900	1:41.286	2	4
3	55	(Hungary) Ferenc Ficza	SEAT León TCR	(Austria) Zele Racing	1:42.080	1:41.294	3	3
4	2	(France) Jean-Karl Vernay	Volkswagen Golf GTI TCR	(Netherlands) Leopard Racing Team WRT	1:42.212	1:41.607	4	2
5	5	(Italy) Roberto Colciago	Honda Civic Type-R TCR	(Hungary) M1RA	1:41.777	1:41.637	5	1
6	1	(Switzerland) Stefano Comini	Audi RS3 LMS TCR	(Belgium) Comtoyou Racing	1:42.595	1:41.723	6	
7	10	(Italy) Gianni Morbidelli	Volkswagen Golf GTI TCR	(Sweden) WestCoast Racing	1:42.545	1:41.755	7	
8	7	(France) Hugo Valente	SEAT León TCR	(Hong Kong) Lukoil Craft-Bamboo Racing	1:42.766	1:41.997	8	
9	74	(Spain) Pepe Oriola	SEAT León TCR	(Hong Kong) Lukoil Craft-Bamboo Racing	1:42.642	1:42.011	9	
10	21	(Italy) Giacomo Altoè	Volkswagen Golf GTI TCR	(Sweden) WestCoast Racing	1:42.515	1:42.234	10	
11	54	(United Kingdom) James Nash	SEAT León TCR	(Hong Kong) Lukoil Craft-Bamboo Racing	1:42.763	1:42.337	11	
12	70	(Slovakia) Maťo Homola	Opel Astra TCR	(Belgium) DG Sport Compétition	1:42.463	1:42.373	12	
13	62	(Serbia) Dušan Borković	Alfa Romeo Giulietta TCR	(Georgia (country)) GE-Force	1:43.184		13	
14	23	(Belgium) Pierre-Yves Corthals	Opel Astra TCR	(Belgium) DG Sport Compétition	1:43.367		14	
15	18	(United States) Duncan Ende	SEAT León TCR	(United States) Icarus Motorsports	1:44.041		15	
16	15	(Georgia (country)) Shota Abkhazava	Alfa Romeo Giulietta TCR	(Georgia (country)) GE-Force	1:45.003		16	

=== Race 1 ===
Pos.	No.	Driver	Car	Team	Laps	Time/Retired	Grid	Points
1	16	(Georgia (country)) Davit Kajaia	Alfa Romeo Giulietta TCR	(Georgia (country)) GE-Force	15	27:47.935	1	25
2	55	(Hungary) Ferenc Ficza	SEAT León TCR	(Austria) Zele Racing	15	+0.374	3	18
3	1	(Switzerland) Stefano Comini	Audi RS3 LMS TCR	(Belgium) Comtoyou Racing	15	+1.176	6	15
4	5	(Italy) Roberto Colciago	Honda Civic Type-R TCR	(Hungary) M1RA	15	+1.478	5	12
5	9	(Hungary) Attila Tassi	Honda Civic Type-R TCR	(Hungary) M1RA	15	+1.783	2	10
6	2	(France) Jean-Karl Vernay	Volkswagen Golf GTI TCR	(Netherlands) Leopard Racing Team WRT	15	+6.667	4	8
7	74	(Spain) Pepe Oriola	SEAT León TCR	(Hong Kong) Lukoil Craft-Bamboo Racing	15	+7.480	9	6
8	21	(Italy) Giacomo Altoè	Volkswagen Golf GTI TCR	(Sweden) WestCoast Racing	15	+7.841	10	4
9	62	(Serbia) Dušan Borković	Alfa Romeo Giulietta TCR	(Georgia (country)) GE-Force	15	+10.842	13	2
10	10	(Italy) Gianni Morbidelli	Volkswagen Golf GTI TCR	(Sweden) WestCoast Racing	15	+11.388	7	1
11	70	(Slovakia) Maťo Homola	Opel Astra TCR	(Belgium) DG Sport Compétition	15	+15.494	12	
12	23	(Belgium) Pierre-Yves Corthals	Opel Astra TCR	(Belgium) DG Sport Compétition	15	+20.653	14	
13	54	(United Kingdom) James Nash	SEAT León TCR	(Hong Kong) Lukoil Craft-Bamboo Racing	15	+24.620	11	
14	18	(United States) Duncan Ende	SEAT León TCR	(United States) Icarus Motorsports	15	+54.323	15	
15	15	(Georgia (country)) Shota Abkhazava	Alfa Romeo Giulietta TCR	(Georgia (country)) GE-Force	15	+1:07.582	16	
Ret	7	(France) Hugo Valente	SEAT León TCR	(Hong Kong) Lukoil Craft-Bamboo Racing	6	Technical	8	

=== Race 2 ===
Pos.	No.	Driver	Car	Team	Laps	Time/Retired	Grid	Points
1	74	(Spain) Pepe Oriola	SEAT León TCR	(Hong Kong) Lukoil Craft-Bamboo Racing	17	31:34.348	2	25
2	9	(Hungary) Attila Tassi	Honda Civic Type-R TCR	(Hungary) M1RA	17	+4.823	9	18
3	2	(France) Jean-Karl Vernay	Volkswagen Golf GTI TCR	(Netherlands) Leopard Racing Team WRT	17	+5.466	7	15
4	62	(Serbia) Dušan Borković	Alfa Romeo Giulietta TCR	(Georgia (country)) GE-Force	17	+16.878	13	12
5	54	(United Kingdom) James Nash	SEAT León TCR	(Hong Kong) Lukoil Craft-Bamboo Racing	17	+19.012	11	10
6	16	(Georgia (country)) Davit Kajaia	Alfa Romeo Giulietta TCR	(Georgia (country)) GE-Force	17	+19.835	10	8
7	10	(Italy) Gianni Morbidelli	Volkswagen Golf GTI TCR	(Sweden) WestCoast Racing	17	+20.271	4	6
8	23	(Belgium) Pierre-Yves Corthals	Opel Astra TCR	(Belgium) DG Sport Compétition	17	+33.498	14	4
9	7	(France) Hugo Valente	SEAT León TCR	(Hong Kong) Lukoil Craft-Bamboo Racing	17	+34.056^{1}	3	2
10	21	(Italy) Giacomo Altoè	Volkswagen Golf GTI TCR	(Sweden) WestCoast Racing	17	+34.127	1	1
11	18	(United States) Duncan Ende	SEAT León TCR	(United States) Icarus Motorsports	17	+42.065	15	
12	5	(Italy) Roberto Colciago	Honda Civic Type-R TCR	(Hungary) M1RA	17	+48.258^{1}	6	
Ret	55	(Hungary) Ferenc Ficza	SEAT León TCR	(Austria) Zele Racing	14	Collision	8	
Ret	1	(Switzerland) Stefano Comini	Audi RS3 LMS TCR	(Belgium) Comtoyou Racing	6	Technical	5	
Ret	15	(Georgia (country)) Shota Abkhazava	Alfa Romeo Giulietta TCR	(Georgia (country)) GE-Force	1	Collision	16	
Ret	70	(Slovakia) Maťo Homola	Opel Astra TCR	(Belgium) DG Sport Compétition	0	Collision	12	

Notes

- ^1 — Hugo Valente and Roberto Colciago received 30 seconds time penalties for overtaking under yellow flags.

== Standings after the event ==
Drivers' Championship standings

Pos	Driver	Points
1	(Georgia (country)) Davit Kajaia	38
2	(Hungary) Attila Tassi	32
3	(Spain) Pepe Oriola	31
4	(France) Jean-Karl Vernay	25
5	(Hungary) Ferenc Ficza	21

Model of the Year standings

Pos	Car	Points
1	SEAT León TCR	62
2	Alfa Romeo Giulietta TCR	52
3	Honda Civic Type-R TCR	47
4	Volkswagen Golf GTI TCR	35
5	Audi RS3 LMS TCR	15

Teams' Championship standings

Pos	Driver	Points
1	(Georgia (country)) GE-Force	52
2	(Hungary) M1RA	45
3	(Hong Kong) Lukoil Craft-Bamboo Racing	41
4	(Netherlands) Leopard Racing Team WRT	25
5	(Austria) Zele Racing	21

- Note: Only the top five positions are included for both sets of drivers' standings.
