= TCR Sakhir Round =

Sakhir TCR Round or variation, may refer to:

- 2016 TCR International Series Sakhir round
- 2017 TCR International Series Sakhir round

== See also ==
- TCR International Series
- Touring car racing (TCR)
- Sakhir Grand Prix
