= 2017 TCR International Series =

Motorsport contest

The 2017 TCR International Series was the third and the last season of the TCR International Series.

Stefano Comini entered the season as defending double champion, but finished only third in the standings with 30 points behind the new champion Jean-Karl Vernay, who won the title with a race to spare in the Dubai round, and Attila Tassi. Comini and Tassi were separated by only one point.

In the teams' standings Hungarian team M1RA managed to secure the title in Dubai, beating the previous champions Craft-Bamboo Racing by 62 points.

== Teams and drivers ==
Team	Car	No.	Drivers	Rounds
(Belgium) Comtoyou Racing	Audi RS 3 LMS TCR	1	(Switzerland) Stefano Comini	All
(Belgium) Comtoyou Racing	Audi RS 3 LMS TCR	6	(Belgium) Frédéric Vervisch	3–10
(Belgium) Comtoyou Racing	SEAT León TCR	4	(Belgium) Denis Dupont	9–10
(Luxembourg) Leopard Racing Team WRT	Volkswagen Golf GTI TCR	2	(France) Jean-Karl Vernay	All
(Luxembourg) Leopard Racing Team WRT	Volkswagen Golf GTI TCR	3	(United Kingdom) Robert Huff	3, 5–9
(Luxembourg) Leopard Racing Team WRT	Volkswagen Golf GTI TCR	14	(Netherlands) Jaap van Lagen	4, 7
(Luxembourg) Leopard Racing Team WRT	Volkswagen Golf GTI TCR	73	(United Kingdom) Gordon Shedden	10
(Belgium) Michaël Mazuin Sport	Volkswagen Golf GTI TCR	52	(Belgium) Maxime Potty	3
(Hungary) M1RA	Honda Civic Type R TCR (FK2)	5	(Italy) Roberto Colciago	All
(Hungary) M1RA	Honda Civic Type R TCR (FK2)	9	(Hungary) Attila Tassi	All
(Hungary) M1RA	Honda Civic Type R TCR (FK2)	21	(Italy) Giacomo Altoè	8
(Hungary) M1RA	Honda Civic Type R TCR (FK2)	59	(Hungary) Norbert Michelisz	6, 8
(Hungary) M1RA	Honda Civic Type R TCR (FK2)	95	(United Kingdom) Josh Files	10
(Hong Kong) Lukoil Craft-Bamboo Racing	SEAT León TCR	7	(France) Hugo Valente	1–4
(Hong Kong) Lukoil Craft-Bamboo Racing	SEAT León TCR	17	(United Kingdom) Daniel Lloyd	5–10
(Hong Kong) Lukoil Craft-Bamboo Racing	SEAT León TCR	54	(United Kingdom) James Nash	All
(Hong Kong) Lukoil Craft-Bamboo Racing	SEAT León TCR	74	(Spain) Pepe Oriola	All
(Germany) Junior Team Engstler	Volkswagen Golf GTI TCR	8	(Germany) Luca Engstler	7
(Sweden) WestCoast Racing	Volkswagen Golf GTI TCR	10	(Italy) Gianni Morbidelli	All
(Sweden) WestCoast Racing	Volkswagen Golf GTI TCR	13	(Germany) Benjamin Leuchter	10
(Sweden) WestCoast Racing	Volkswagen Golf GTI TCR	19	(Thailand) Kantadhee Kusiri	8
(Sweden) WestCoast Racing	Volkswagen Golf GTI TCR	21	(Italy) Giacomo Altoè	1–7
(Sweden) WestCoast Racing	Volkswagen Golf GTI TCR	99	(France) Rafaël Galiana	9
(Denmark) Reno Racing	Honda Civic Type R TCR (FK2)	11	(Denmark) Jens Reno Møller	3–7
(Belgium) Delahaye Racing	SEAT León TCR	12	(Belgium) Guillaume Mondron	3
(Belgium) Delahaye Racing	Volkswagen Golf GTI TCR	25	(Belgium) Edouard Mondron	3
(Georgia (country)) GE-Force	Alfa Romeo Giulietta TCR	15	(Georgia (country)) Shota Abkhazava	1
(Georgia (country)) GE-Force	Alfa Romeo Giulietta TCR	16	(Georgia (country)) Davit Kajaia	All
(Georgia (country)) GE-Force	Alfa Romeo Giulietta TCR	62	(Serbia) Dušan Borković	All
(Georgia (country)) GE-Force	Alfa Romeo Giulietta TCR	88	(Italy) Michela Cerruti	2
(United States) Icarus Motorsports	SEAT León TCR	18	(United States) Duncan Ende	All
(Hungary) Unicorse Team	Alfa Romeo Giulietta TCR	20	(Hungary) Márk Jedlóczky	6
(Belgium) DG Sport Compétition	Opel Astra TCR	23	(Belgium) Pierre-Yves Corthals	1–4
(Belgium) DG Sport Compétition	Opel Astra TCR	27	(France) Aurélien Comte	10
(Belgium) DG Sport Compétition	Opel Astra TCR	66	(France) Grégoire Demoustier	5–7
(Belgium) DG Sport Compétition	Opel Astra TCR	67	(Thailand) Munkong Sathienthirakul	8
(Belgium) DG Sport Compétition	Opel Astra TCR	70	(Slovakia) Maťo Homola	All
(Hungary) Botka Rally Team	Kia Cee'd TCR	26	(Hungary) István Bernula	6
(Belgium) Boutsen Ginion Racing	Honda Civic Type R TCR (FK2)	28	(France) Aurélien Panis	7–10
(Belgium) Boutsen Ginion Racing	Honda Civic Type R TCR (FK2)	63	(Belgium) Benjamin Lessennes	3
(Belgium) Boutsen Ginion Racing	Honda Civic Type R TCR (FK2)	64	(Netherlands) Tom Coronel	3
(Serbia) ASK Vesnić	Audi RS 3 LMS TCR	31	(Serbia) Milovan Vesnić	5–6
(Italy) Top Run Motorsport	Subaru WRX STi TCR	32	(Italy) Luigi Ferrara	5
(Norway) Stian Paulsen Racing	SEAT León TCR	34	(Norway) Stian Paulsen	3–7
(Germany) Kissling Motorsport	Opel Astra TCR	35	(Austria) Thomas Jäger	5
(Italy) Pit Lane Competizioni	Audi RS 3 LMS TCR	36	(Italy) Enrico Bettera	5
(Netherlands) Ferry Monster Autosport	SEAT León TCR	38	(Netherlands) Danny Kroes	7
(Austria) Zele Racing	SEAT León TCR	55	(Hungary) Ferenc Ficza	1–2, 4
(Hungary) Zengő Motorsport	Kia Cee'd TCR	55	(Hungary) Ferenc Ficza	6–7
(Hungary) Zengő Motorsport	SEAT León TCR	55	(Hungary) Ferenc Ficza	3, 5
(Hungary) Zengő Motorsport	SEAT León TCR	77	(Hungary) Anett György	6
(Hungary) Zengő Motorsport	SEAT León TCR	78	(Hungary) Csaba Tóth	6
(Hungary) Zengő Motorsport	SEAT León TCR	80	(Hungary) Dániel Nagy	6
(Malaysia) Viper Niza Racing	SEAT León TCR	65	(Malaysia) Douglas Khoo	8
(China) ZZZ Team	Audi RS 3 LMS TCR	71	(China) Tengyi Jiang	9
(China) ZZZ Team	Audi RS 3 LMS TCR	81	(China) Zhendong Zhang	9
(Italy) CRC - Cappellari Reparto Corse	SEAT León TCR	76	(Italy) Daniele Cappellari	4
(Thailand) Yontrakit Racing Team	SEAT León TCR	83	(Thailand) Rattanin Leenutaphong	8
(Thailand) RMI Racing Team by Sunoco	SEAT León TCR	84	(Thailand) Pasarit Promsombat	8
(Thailand) Billionaire Boys Racing	Honda Civic Type R TCR (FK2)	85	(Thailand) Chariya Nuya	8
(Thailand) TBN MK Ihere Racing Team	Honda Civic Type R TCR (FK2)	86	(Thailand) Nattachak Hanjitkasen	8
(Thailand) Morin Racing Team	SEAT León TCR	96	(Thailand) Nattanid Leewattanavaragul	8
Entries ineligible for points
(Italy) BRC Racing Team	Hyundai i30 N TCR	30	(Italy) Gabriele Tarquini	9–10
(Italy) BRC Racing Team	Hyundai i30 N TCR	33	(Switzerland) Alain Menu	9–10

=== Team and driver changes ===
Stefano Comini left Leopard Racing to join the newly entered Comtoyou Racing with Audi RS3 LMS TCR. Frédéric Vervisch joined the team in the second Audi from Spa onwards, while for the final two rounds of the season they've entered a third entry for TCR Benelux regular Denis Dupont who was behind the wheel of SEAT León TCR.

Leopard Racing retained Jean-Karl Vernay and at Spa they've entered a second car for Robert Huff. Huff only entered rounds which did not clashed with his commitments in the World Touring Car Championship. At Monza he was replaced by Jaap van Lagen and in Dubai by Gordon Shedden. Van Lagen entered in Oschersleben in a third car. The team also supported Maxime Potty who entered at Spa under the Michaël Mazurin Sport banner.

Craft-Bamboo Racing retained Pepe Oriola and James Nash, but Sergey Afanasyev was replaced by Hugo Valente. Valente left the team after Monza and his seat was taken by Daniel Lloyd.

WestCoast Racing switched from Civic Type R TCR (FK2) to Volkswagen Golf GTI TCR. As a result, the team ended their association with Sportspromotion – the operation responsible for WestCoast Racing's entry in the series. The team retained Gianni Morbidelli while Giacomo Altoè was entered in the second car. Altoè would leave the team after Oschersleben and he was replaced by the TCR Asia Series regular Kantadhee Kusiri at Buriram, Rafaël Galiana at Zhejiang and Benjamin Leuchter at Dubai.

The newly formed team of M1RA entered the series entering two Civic Type R TCR (FK2) cars for the veteran Roberto Colciago and Attila Tassi. Norbert Michelisz, who is also co-owner of the team, entered at Hungaroring in a third Civic and in Buriram as stand-in for Colciago, who was recovering from injuries sustained during the Oschersleben round. Giacomo Altoè entered the team in Buriram in the team's third entry and double ADAC TCR Germany champion Josh Files entered in Dubai.

TCR Benelux team DG Sport Compétition entered the series with two Opel Astra TCR cars for TCR Trophy Europe winner Pierre-Yves Corthals and Maťo Homola. Corthals was later replaced by Grégoire Demoustier who later left the team after Oschersleben. With the exception of Zhejiang, where the team entered a single car for Homola, the team's second entry was driven by Munkong Sathienthirakul in Buriram and by 2017 TCR Trophy Europe winner Aurélien Comte in Dubai.

Davit Kajaia left Liqui Moly Team Engstler to form GE Force in partnership with Romeo Ferraris who provided the team with two Alfa Romeo Giulietta TCR cars. Dušan Borković joined the team in the second car. The team also entered a third car for Rustavi International Motorpark owner Shota Abkhazava in Rustavi and for Michela Cerruti in Bahrain.

Duncan Ende made his series début driving for his own team Icarus Motorsports in a SEAT León TCR.

Zengő Motorsport returned to the series after missing out the previous season. The team was supposed to enter Cee'd TCR for Ferenc Ficza, but due to delays in delivery Ficza was rotating between Zengõ Motorsport and Zele Racing driving SEAT León TCR. In Hungaroring the Cee'd TCR made its debut appearance with Ficza behind the wheel, but after Oschersleben the team withdrew from the season due to reliability issues.

Stian Paulsen and Jens Reno Møller entered the series from Spa to Oschersleben rider for their own teams - Stian Paulsen Racing and Reno Racing. The European TCR rounds counted as qualification for the 2017 TCR Trophy Europe, but neither of them entered the event.

After fielding two one-off entries for their TCR Benelux drivers Tom Coronel and Benjamin Lessennes at Spa, Boutsen Ginion Racing entered a single Honda Civic Type R TCR for Aurélien Panis from Oschersleben onwards.

Liqui Moly Team Engstler left the series to concentrate on their campaigns in TCR Asia Series and ADAC TCR Germany Touring Car Championship. The team entered Luca Engstler in Oschesleben under the Junior Team Engstler banner.

BRC Racing Team made its début in the series for the final two rounds of the season fielding two Hyundai i30 N TCR cars for veteran riders Gabriele Tarquini and Alain Menu The team received support from Hyundai Motorsport. However, as the i30 N TCR was given temporary homologation neither the team, nor its drivers were eligible to score points.

B3 Racing folded after the end of the 2016 season due to financial difficulties. Many of the team's personnel went on to form M1RA.

Target Competition also left the series after 2016 to concentrate on their efforts in ADAC TCR Germany.

== Calendar ==
The 2017 provisional schedule was announced on 28 November 2016, with ten events scheduled.

Rnd.		Circuit	Date	Supporting
1	1	(Georgia (country)) Rustavi International Motorpark, Tbilisi	1 April	stand-alone event
1	2	(Georgia (country)) Rustavi International Motorpark, Tbilisi	2 April	stand-alone event
2	1	Bahrain International Circuit, Sakhir	15 April	Bahrain Grand Prix
2	2	Bahrain International Circuit, Sakhir	16 April	Bahrain Grand Prix
3	1	(Belgium) Circuit de Spa-Francorchamps, Stavelot	6 May	6 Hours of Spa-Francorchamps
3	2	(Belgium) Circuit de Spa-Francorchamps, Stavelot	7 May	6 Hours of Spa-Francorchamps
4	1	(Italy) Autodromo Nazionale di Monza, Monza	13 May	European Le Mans Series
4	2	(Italy) Autodromo Nazionale di Monza, Monza	14 May	European Le Mans Series
5	1	(Austria) Salzburgring, Salzburg	10 June	stand-alone event
5	2	(Austria) Salzburgring, Salzburg	11 June	stand-alone event
6	1	(Hungary) Hungaroring, Budapest	17 June	Deutsche Tourenwagen Masters
6	2	(Hungary) Hungaroring, Budapest	18 June	Deutsche Tourenwagen Masters
7	1	(Germany) Motorsport Arena Oschersleben, Oschersleben	8 July	ADAC TCR Germany Touring Car Championship
7	2	(Germany) Motorsport Arena Oschersleben, Oschersleben	9 July	ADAC TCR Germany Touring Car Championship
8	1	(Thailand) Chang International Circuit, Buriram	2 September	TCR Thailand Series
8	2	(Thailand) Chang International Circuit, Buriram	3 September	TCR Thailand Series
9	1	(China) Zhejiang International Circuit, Zhejiang	7 October	TCR China Series; TCR Asia Series
9	2	(China) Zhejiang International Circuit, Zhejiang	8 October	TCR China Series; TCR Asia Series
10	1	(United Arab Emirates) Dubai Autodrome, Dubai	17 November	stand-alone event
10	2	(United Arab Emirates) Dubai Autodrome, Dubai	18 November	stand-alone event

=== Calendar changes ===
The rounds held at Autodromo do Estoril, Autodromo Enzo e Dino Ferrari, Sochi Autodrom, Marina Bay Street Circuit, Sepang International Circuit and Guia Circuit were discontinued.

The series made their debut in Georgia at the Rustavi International Motorpark which opened the season.

The provisional calendar featured a round at the Circuit de Monaco supporting the Monaco Grand Prix, but was removed as it wasn't approved by the Monegasque ASN as they had never entered negotiations to stage the race. It was replaced by Autodromo Nazionale di Monza in Italy as supporting series to the European Le Mans Series.

With the release of the TCR China Touring Car Championship the calendar slot for October, which was left vacant, was given to the Zhejiang International Circuit. In the previous two seasons the series visited Shanghai International Circuit.

The round in Hungaroring was originally scheduled on 1–2 July, but for logistics reasons it was pulled back two weeks earlier than planned. The change also meant that the series would support the Hungarian round of the Deutsche Tourenwagen Masters.

The season finale which was supposed to be held on Yas Marina Circuit supporting the Abu Dhabi Grand Prix was moved to Dubai Autodrome with the new date being a week earlier.

== Results ==
Rnd.		Circuit	Pole position	Fastest lap	Winning driver	Winning team	Report
1	1	(Georgia (country)) Rustavi International Motorpark	(Georgia (country)) Davit Kajaia	(Georgia (country)) Davit Kajaia	(Georgia (country)) Davit Kajaia	(Georgia (country)) GE-Force	Report
1	2	(Georgia (country)) Rustavi International Motorpark		(Spain) Pepe Oriola	(Spain) Pepe Oriola	(Hong Kong) Lukoil Craft-Bamboo Racing	Report
2	3	Bahrain International Circuit	(Slovakia) Maťo Homola	(Georgia (country)) Davit Kajaia	(Italy) Roberto Colciago	(Hungary) M1RA	Report
2	4	Bahrain International Circuit		(Serbia) Dušan Borković	(Serbia) Dušan Borković	(Georgia (country)) GE-Force	Report
3	5	(Belgium) Circuit de Spa-Francorchamps	(Switzerland) Stefano Comini	(Switzerland) Stefano Comini	(Switzerland) Stefano Comini	(Belgium) Comtoyou Racing	Report
3	6	(Belgium) Circuit de Spa-Francorchamps		(Switzerland) Stefano Comini	(France) Jean-Karl Vernay	(Luxembourg) Leopard Racing Team WRT	Report
4	7	(Italy) Autodromo Nazionale di Monza	(Belgium) Frédéric Vervisch	(Belgium) Frédéric Vervisch	(Italy) Roberto Colciago	(Hungary) M1RA	Report
4	8	(Italy) Autodromo Nazionale di Monza		(Hungary) Attila Tassi	(Switzerland) Stefano Comini	(Belgium) Comtoyou Racing	Report
5	9	(Austria) Salzburgring	(Slovakia) Maťo Homola	(Switzerland) Stefano Comini	(Serbia) Dušan Borković	(Georgia (country)) GE-Force	Report
5	10	(Austria) Salzburgring		(Austria) Thomas Jäger	(Italy) Roberto Colciago	(Hungary) M1RA	Report
6	11	(Hungary) Hungaroring	(Hungary) Norbert Michelisz	(Hungary) Norbert Michelisz	(Hungary) Attila Tassi	(Hungary) M1RA	Report
6	12	(Hungary) Hungaroring		(Spain) Pepe Oriola	(Hungary) Attila Tassi	(Hungary) M1RA	Report
7	13	(Germany) Motorsport Arena Oschersleben	(Italy) Gianni Morbidelli	(Italy) Gianni Morbidelli	(Italy) Gianni Morbidelli	(Sweden) WestCoast Racing	Report
7	14	(Germany) Motorsport Arena Oschersleben		(Italy) Gianni Morbidelli	(Italy) Gianni Morbidelli	(Sweden) WestCoast Racing	Report
8	15	(Thailand) Chang International Circuit	(Slovakia) Maťo Homola	(Slovakia) Maťo Homola	(Hungary) Norbert Michelisz	(Hungary) M1RA	Report
8	16	(Thailand) Chang International Circuit		(France) Aurélien Panis	(France) Aurélien Panis	(Belgium) Boutsen Ginion Racing	Report
9	17	(China) Zhejiang International Circuit	(United Kingdom) Robert Huff	(France) Aurélien Panis (Note: Actual fastest lap of race recorded by Gabriele Tarquini, but he was ineligible to score the fastest lap of the race, due to his Hyundai i30 N TCR running on temporary homologation.)	(France) Jean-Karl Vernay (Note: Actual victory in race scored by Gabriele Tarquini for BRC Racing Team, but as the Hyundai i30 N TCR was running on temporary homologation, he was ineligible to score points.)	(Luxembourg) Leopard Racing Team WRT	Report
9	18	(China) Zhejiang International Circuit		(Italy) Gianni Morbidelli	(United Kingdom) Robert Huff	(Luxembourg) Leopard Racing Team WRT	Report
10	19	(United Arab Emirates) Dubai Autodrome	(United Kingdom) Gordon Shedden	(Spain) Pepe Oriola	(Spain) Pepe Oriola	(Hong Kong) Lukoil Craft-Bamboo Racing	Report
10	20	(United Arab Emirates) Dubai Autodrome		(Hungary) Attila Tassi	(Switzerland) Stefano Comini	(Belgium) Comtoyou Racing	Report

== Fan Award ==
At the end of every weekend, a panel consisting of the International Series' Promoter and the promotional and media team name three candidates who stood out during the event for any particular reason.

Race	Winner	Other candidates
(Georgia (country)) Rustavi	(Hungary) Ferenc Ficza	(Hungary) Attila Tassi and (Georgia (country)) Davit Kajaia
(Bahrain) Sakhir	(Serbia) Dušan Borković	(France) Jean-Karl Vernay and (France) Hugo Valente
(Belgium) Spa-Francorchamps	(Hungary) Attila Tassi	(Belgium) Benjamin Lessennes and (Switzerland) Stefano Comini
(Italy) Monza	(Italy) Roberto Colciago	(Switzerland) Stefano Comini and (Norway) Stian Paulsen
(Austria) Salzburgring	(Hungary) Attila Tassi	(Switzerland) Stefano Comini and (Denmark) Jens Reno Møller
(Hungary) Hungaroring	(Denmark) Jens Reno Møller	(Italy) Giacomo Altoè and (France) Jean-Karl Vernay
(Germany) Oschersleben	(Slovakia) Maťo Homola	(United Kingdom) Daniel Lloyd and (Italy) Gianni Morbidelli
(Thailand) Buriram	Not held	
(China) Zhejiang	(China) Zhendong Zhang	(United Kingdom) Robert Huff and (Italy) Gianni Morbidelli
(United Arab Emirates) Dubai	Not held	

== Championship standings ==
=== Drivers' championship ===
Pos.	Driver	RIM (Georgia (country))		BHR (Bahrain)		SPA (Belgium)		MNZ (Italy)		SAL (Austria)		HUN (Hungary)		OSC (Germany)		BUR (Thailand)		ZHE (China)		DUB (United Arab Emirates)		Pts.
1	(France) Jean-Karl Vernay	6^{4}	3	3	4	4^{4}	1	4	5	17†	DNS	3^{2}	7	Ret	3	4^{4}	5	2^{2}	12	3^{2}	15†	226
2	(Hungary) Attila Tassi	5^{2}	2	12	8	3	9	2^{3}	9	9^{4}	2	1^{3}	1	DSQ	11†	3^{5}	4	11	9	5	12	197
3	(Switzerland) Stefano Comini	3	Ret	8	9	**1**^{1}	3	8	1	3	3	12	10	6	5	7	3	13	Ret	7	1	196
4	(Spain) Pepe Oriola	7	1	6	7	9	Ret	3	8	5^{3}	Ret	5^{4}	2	18†^{5}	Ret	21†	Ret	5^{3}	5	1^{4}	Ret	164
5	(Italy) Roberto Colciago	4^{5}	12	1^{4}	5	20	13	1^{2}	2	12	1	4^{5}	5	14	Ret	WD	WD	7	8	Ret	DNS	161
6	(Italy) Gianni Morbidelli	10	7	9	10	12	15	11	16	13	5	9	Ret	**1**^{1}	1	10	13	4^{4}	2	16^{5}	2	132
7	(United Kingdom) James Nash	13	5	7	2	11	8	12	4	6	6	7	9	4	Ret	Ret^{2}	7	9	3	4	11	129
8	(Serbia) Dušan Borković	9	4	4	1	16	11	9	Ret	1^{2}	Ret	NC	Ret	Ret	Ret	2	6	Ret	DNS	8	8	118
9	(United Kingdom) Robert Huff					6^{5}	2			Ret	DNS	Ret	11	3^{4}	Ret	5	8	**3**^{1}	1			106
10	(Belgium) Frédéric Vervisch					5^{2}	6	**5**^{1}	3	10	Ret	Ret	20†	10	6	11	14	6	Ret	11	4	84
11	(Georgia (country)) Davit Kajaia	**1**^{1}	6	Ret^{5}	15†	18	7	16†^{4}	7	7	11	11	Ret	16	9†	8	23†	8	Ret	9	10	77
12	(Slovakia) Maťo Homola	11	Ret	**13**^{1}	13	24	Ret	7^{5}	6	**2**^{1}	10	10	12	7	2	**22†**^{1}	9	Ret	Ret	12	Ret	76
13	(Italy) Giacomo Altoè	8	10	10	Ret	14	10	Ret	12	15	8	8	4	5	Ret	6	2					63
14	(Hungary) Norbert Michelisz											**2**^{1}	6			1^{3}	22†					59
15	(United Kingdom) Daniel Lloyd									11	7	6	Ret	2^{3}	4	9	11	Ret^{5}	DNS	Ret	DNS	50
16	(France) Hugo Valente	Ret	9	2^{3}	3	15	Ret	6	Ret													46
17	(Hungary) Ferenc Ficza	2^{3}	13†	11	6	13	14	10	10	WD	WD	19	14	12	10							32
18	(Belgium) Benjamin Lessennes					2^{3}	5															31
19	(United Kingdom) Gordon Shedden																			**2**^{1}	7	31
20	(France) Aurélien Panis													15†	DNS	19	1	10	13	14	13	27
21	(Denmark) Jens Reno Møller					21	Ret	14	13	8	9	14	3	17†	8							25
22	(Austria) Thomas Jäger									4^{5}	4											25
23	(United Kingdom) Josh Files																			6	3	23
24	(Belgium) Pierre-Yves Corthals	12	8	5^{2}	11	10	Ret	17†	14													19
25	(Belgium) Edouard Mondron					7	4															18
26	(Germany) Benjamin Leuchter																			13^{3}	6	13
27	(China) Zhendong Zhang																	14	7			10
28	(United States) Duncan Ende	14	11	15†	14	22	17	WD	WD	18†	Ret	Ret	Ret	13	7	13	15	17	11	10	14	9
29	(Netherlands) Jaap van Lagen							Ret	11					8^{2}	Ret							8
30	(Norway) Stian Paulsen					23	Ret	13	Ret	Ret	Ret	Ret	8	DSQ	Ret							4
31	(Netherlands) Tom Coronel					8	Ret															4
32	(France) Rafael Galiana																	15	10			4
33	(Netherlands) Danny Kroes													9	Ret							2
34	(Thailand) Kantadhee Kusiri															12	10					1
	(France) Grégoire Demoustier									14	Ret	13	13	11	12†							0
	(Italy) Michela Cerruti			14	12																	0
	(Thailand) Munkong Sathienthirakul															14	12					0
	(Italy) Enrico Bettera									16	12											0
	(Belgium) Guillaume Mondron					19	12															0
	(Italy) Daniele Cappellari							15	15													0
	(Hungary) Márk Jedlóczky											16	15									0
	(Thailand) Chariya Nuya															15	16					0
	(Georgia (country)) Shota Abkhazava	15	Ret																			0
	(Hungary) Dániel Nagy											15	DNS									0
	(Belgium) Maxime Potty					17	16															0
	(Thailand) Nattanid Leewattanavaragul															16	17					0
	(China) Tengyi Jiang																	16	Ret			0
	(France) Aurélien Comte																			Ret	16	0
	(Hungary) István Bernula											DNS	16									0
	(Hungary) Anett György											18	17									0
	(Serbia) Milovan Vesnić									Ret	DNS	17	19†									0
	(Thailand) Rattanin Leenutaphong															17	19					0
	(Belgium) Denis Dupont																	Ret	DNS	Ret	17†	0
	(Hungary) Csaba Tóth											20	18									0
	(Thailand) Nattachak Hanjitkasen															18	20					0
	(Thailand) Pasarit Promsombat															23†	18					0
	(Malaysia) Douglas Khoo															20	21					0
	(Germany) Luca Engstler													Ret	DNS							0
	(Italy) Luigi Ferrara									DNS	DNS											0
Drivers ineligible to score points
	(Italy) Gabriele Tarquini																	1	6	15	9	
	(Switzerland) Alain Menu																	12	4	Ret	5	
Pos.	Driver	RIM (Georgia (country))		BHR (Bahrain)		SPA (Belgium)		MNZ (Italy)		SAL (Austria)		HUN (Hungary)		OSC (Germany)		BUR (Thailand)		ZHE (China)		DUB (United Arab Emirates)		Pts.

Colour	Result
Gold	Winner
Silver	Second place
Bronze	Third place
Green	Points classification
Blue	Non-points classification
Blue	Non-classified finish (NC)
Purple	Retired, not classified (Ret)
Red	Did not qualify (DNQ)
Red	Did not pre-qualify (DNPQ)
Black	Disqualified (DSQ)
White	Did not start (DNS)
White	Withdrew (WD)
White	Race cancelled (C)
Blank	Did not practice (DNP)
Blank	Did not arrive (DNA)
Blank	Excluded (EX)

**Bold** – Pole
Italics – Fastest Lap

† – Drivers did not finish the race, but were classified as they completed over 75% of the race distance.

=== Teams' Championship ===
Pos.	Team	RIM (Georgia (country))		BHR (Bahrain)		SPA (Belgium)		MNZ (Italy)		SAL (Austria)		HUN (Hungary)		OSC (Germany)		BUR (Thailand)		ZHE (China)		DUB (United Arab Emirates)		Pts.
1	(Hungary) M1RA	4^{5}	2	1^{4}	5	3	9	1^{2}	2	9^{4}	1	1^{1}	1	14	11†	1^{3}	2	7	8	5	3	439
1	(Hungary) M1RA	5^{2}	12	12	8	20	13	2^{3}	9	12	2	2^{3}	5	DSQ	DNS	3^{5}	4	11	9	6	12	439
2	(Hong Kong) Lukoil Craft-Bamboo Racing	7	1	2^{3}	2	9	8	3	4	5^{3}	6	5^{4}	2	2	4	9	7	5^{3}	3	1	11	377
2	(Hong Kong) Lukoil Craft-Bamboo Racing	13	5	6	3	11	Ret	6	8	6	7	6	9	4	DNS	21†	11	9^{5}	5	4	Ret	377
3	(Luxembourg) Leopard Racing Team WRT	6^{4}	3	3	4	4^{4}	1	4	5	17†	DNS	3^{2}	7	3^{4}	3	4^{4}	5	2^{1}	1	2	7	375
3	(Luxembourg) Leopard Racing Team WRT					6^{5}	2	Ret	11	Ret	DNS	Ret^{5}	11	8	Ret	5	8	3^{2}	12	3	15	375
4	(Belgium) Comtoyou Racing	3	Ret	8	9	1^{1}	3	5^{1}	1	3	3	12	10	6	5	7	3	6	Ret	7	1	289
4	(Belgium) Comtoyou Racing					5^{2}	6	8	3	10	Ret	Ret	20†	10	6	11	14	13	Ret	11	4	289
5	(Sweden) WestCoast Racing	8	7	9	10	12	10	11	12	13	5	8	4	1^{1}	1	10	10	4^{4}	2	13	2	201
5	(Sweden) WestCoast Racing	10	10	10	Ret	13	15	Ret	16	15	8	9	Ret	5	DNS	12	13	15	10	16	6	201
6	(Georgia (country)) GE-Force	1^{1}	4	4^{5}	1	16	7	9^{4}	7	1^{2}	11	11	Ret	16	9	2	6	8	Ret	8	8	196
6	(Georgia (country)) GE-Force	9	6	14	12	18	11	16†	Ret	7	Ret	Ret	Ret	Ret	Ret	8	23†	Ret	DNS	9	10	196
7	(Belgium) DG Sport Compétition	11	8	5^{1}	11	10	Ret	7^{5}	6	2^{1}	10	10	12	7	2	14^{1}	9	Ret	Ret	12	15	103
7	(Belgium) DG Sport Compétition	12	Ret	13^{2}	13	24	Ret	17†	14	14	Ret	13	13	11	12†	22†	12			Ret	Ret	103
8	(Belgium) Boutsen Ginion Racing					2^{3}	5							15†	DNS	19	1	10	13	14	13	64
8	(Belgium) Boutsen Ginion Racing					8	Ret															64
9	(Austria) Zele Racing	2^{3}	13†	11	6			10	10													32
10	(Denmark) Reno Racing					21	Ret	14	13	8	9	14	3	18†	8							25
11	(Germany) Kissling Motorsport									4^{5}	4											25
12	(Belgium) Delahaye Racing					7	4															18
12	(Belgium) Delahaye Racing					19	12															18
13	(United States) Icarus Motorsports	14	11	15†	14	22	17	WD	WD	18†	Ret	Ret	Ret	13	7	13	15	17	11	10	14	10
14	(China) ZZZ Team																	14	7			10
14	(China) ZZZ Team																	16	Ret			10
15	(Norway) Stian Paulsen Racing					23	Ret	13	Ret	Ret	Ret	Ret	8	DSQ	DNS							6
16	(Netherlands) Ferry Monster Autosport													9	Ret							2
17	(Hungary) Zengő Motorsport					14	14			WD	WD	15	14	12	10							1
17	(Hungary) Zengő Motorsport											18	17									1
	(Italy) Pit Lane Competizioni									16	12											0
	(Italy) CRC - Cappellari Reparto Corse							15	15													0
	(Hungary) Unicorse Team											16	15									0
	(Thailand) Billionaire Boys Racing															15	16					0
	(Belgium) Michaël Mazuin Sport					17	16															0
	(Thailand) Morin Racing Team															16	17					0
	(Hungary) Botka Rally Team											DNS	16									0
	(Serbia) ASK Vesnić									Ret	DNS	17	19†									0
	(Thailand) Yontrakit Racing Team															17	19					0
	(Thailand) TBN MK Ihere Racing Team															18	20					0
	(Thailand) RMI Racing Team by Sunoco															23†	18					0
	(Malaysia) Viper Niza Racing															20	21					0
	(Germany) Junior Team Engstler													Ret	DNS							0
	(Italy) Top Run Motorsport									DNS	DNS											0
Teams ineligible to score points
	(Italy) BRC Racing Team																	1	4	15	5	
	(Italy) BRC Racing Team																	12	6	Ret	9	
Pos.	Team	RIM (Georgia (country))		BHR (Bahrain)		SPA (Belgium)		MNZ (Italy)		SAL (Austria)		HUN (Hungary)		OSC (Germany)		BUR (Thailand)		ZHE (China)		DUB (United Arab Emirates)		Pts.

Colour	Result
Gold	Winner
Silver	Second place
Bronze	Third place
Green	Points classification
Blue	Non-points classification
Blue	Non-classified finish (NC)
Purple	Retired, not classified (Ret)
Red	Did not qualify (DNQ)
Red	Did not pre-qualify (DNPQ)
Black	Disqualified (DSQ)
White	Did not start (DNS)
White	Withdrew (WD)
White	Race cancelled (C)
Blank	Did not practice (DNP)
Blank	Did not arrive (DNA)
Blank	Excluded (EX)

**Bold** – Pole
Italics – Fastest Lap

† – Drivers did not finish the race, but were classified as they completed over 75% of the race distance.

=== Model of the year ===
Pos.	Car	RIM (Georgia (country))		BHR (Bahrain)		SPA (Belgium)		MNZ (Italy)		SAL (Austria)		HUN (Hungary)		OSC (Germany)		BUR (Thailand)		ZHE (China)		DUB (United Arab Emirates)		Pts.
1	Volkswagen Golf GTI TCR	6^{4}	3	3	4	4^{4}	1	4	5	13	5	3^{2}	4	1^{1}	1	4^{4}	5	2^{1}	1	2^{1}	2	520
1	Volkswagen Golf GTI TCR	8	7	9	10	6^{5}	2	11	11	15	8	8^{5}	7	3	3	5	8	3^{2}	2	3^{2}	6	520
2	Honda Civic Type R TCR	4^{2}	2	1^{4}	5	2^{3}	5	1^{2}	2	8^{4}	1	1^{1}	1	14	8	1^{3}	1	7^{5}	8	5	3	515
2	Honda Civic Type R TCR	5^{5}	12	12	8	3	9	2^{3}	9	9	2	2^{3}	3	15†	11†	3^{5}	2	10	9	6	12	515
3	SEAT León TCR	2^{3}	1	2^{3}	2	9	8	3	4	5^{3}	6	5^{4}	2	2^{3}	4	9^{2}	7	5^{3}	3	1^{3}	11	435
3	SEAT León TCR	7	5	6	3	11	12	6	8	6	7	6	8	4	7	13	11	9^{4}	5	4^{4}	14	435
4	Audi RS 3 LMS TCR	3	Ret	8	9	1^{1}	3	5^{1}	1	3	3	12	10	6	5	7	3	6	7	7	1	320
4	Audi RS 3 LMS TCR					5^{2}	6	8	3	10	12	17	19	10	6	11	14	13	Ret	12	4	320
5	Alfa Romeo Giulietta TCR	1^{1}	4	4^{5}	1	16	7	9^{4}	7	1^{2}	11	11	15	16	9†	2	6	8	Ret	9	8	214
5	Alfa Romeo Giulietta TCR	9	6	14	12	18	11	16†	Ret	7	Ret	16	Ret	Ret	Ret	8	23†	Ret	DNS	10	10	214
6	Opel Astra TCR	11	8	5^{1}	11	10	Ret	7^{5}	6	2^{1}	4	10	12	7	2	14^{1}	9	Ret	Ret	8^{5}	16	154
6	Opel Astra TCR	12	Ret	13^{2}	13	24	Ret	17†	14	4^{5}	10	13	13	11	12†	22	12			Ret	Ret	154
7	Kia Cee'd TCR													12	10							3
Cars ineligible to score points
	Hyundai i30 N TCR																	1	4	15	5	
	Hyundai i30 N TCR																	12	6	Ret	9	
	Kia Cee'd TCR											19	14									
	Kia Cee'd TCR											DNS	16									
Pos.	Car	RIM (Georgia (country))		BHR (Bahrain)		SPA (Belgium)		MNZ (Italy)		SAL (Austria)		HUN (Hungary)		OSC (Germany)		BUR (Thailand)		ZHE (China)		DUB (United Arab Emirates)		Pts.

Colour	Result
Gold	Winner
Silver	Second place
Bronze	Third place
Green	Points classification
Blue	Non-points classification
Blue	Non-classified finish (NC)
Purple	Retired, not classified (Ret)
Red	Did not qualify (DNQ)
Red	Did not pre-qualify (DNPQ)
Black	Disqualified (DSQ)
White	Did not start (DNS)
White	Withdrew (WD)
White	Race cancelled (C)
Blank	Did not practice (DNP)
Blank	Did not arrive (DNA)
Blank	Excluded (EX)

**Bold** – Pole
Italics – Fastest Lap

† – Drivers did not finish the race, but were classified as they completed over 75% of the race distance.
