= Márk Jedlóczky =

Hungarian racing driver

- Nationality: Hungarian
- Born: 3 August 1999 (age 27) Miskolc, Hungary

TCR International Series career
- Debut season: 2017
- Current team: Unicorse Team
- Car number: 20
- Starts: 2

Previous series
- 2017 2015-16: FIA Central European Zone Circuit Championship; Hungarian FRT Series

Márk L. Jedlóczky (born 3 August 1999) is a Hungarian racing driver currently competing in the TCR International Series and FIA Central European Zone Circuit Championship. Having previously competed in the Hungarian FRT Series.

== Racing career ==
Jedlóczky began his career in 2014 in slalom racing, winning in three out of four entered events. In 2015, he switched to the Hungarian FRT Series, he continued in the series for 2016 and finished second in the championship standings that year. For 2017, he switched to the FIA Central European Zone Circuit Championship, he won both his first two races of the season in the D6-5 class of the championship.

In June 2017, it was announced that Jedlóczky would race in the TCR International Series, driving an Alfa Romeo Giulietta TCR for Unicorse Team.

== Racing record ==
=== Career summary ===
Season	Series	Team	Races	Wins	Poles	F/Laps	Podiums	Points	Position
2017	TCR International Series	Unicorse Team	2	0	0	0	0	0	NC
2018	TCR Europe Touring Car Series	JLG Motorsport with Zengő	6	0	0	0	0	1	27th

=== Complete TCR International Series results ===
(key) (Races in bold indicate pole position) (Races in italics indicate fastest lap)

Year	Team	Car	1	2	3	4	5	6	7	8	9	10	11	12	13	14	15	16	17	18	19	20	DC	Points
2017	Unicorse Team	Alfa Romeo Giulietta TCR	RIM; 1	RIM; 2	BHR; 1	BHR; 2	SPA; 1	SPA; 2	MNZ; 1	MNZ; 2	SAL; 1	SAL; 2	HUN; 1; 17	HUN; 2; 15	OSC; 1	OSC; 2	CHA; 1	CHA; 2	ZHE; 1	ZHE; 2	DUB; 1	DUB; 2	NC	0

=== Complete TCR Europe Series results ===
(key) (Races in bold indicate pole position) (Races in italics indicate fastest lap)

Year	Team	Car	1	2	3	4	5	6	7	8	9	10	11	12	13	14	DC	Points
2018	JLG Motorsport with Zengő	CUPRA León TCR	LEC; 1; 15	LEC; 2; 11	ZAN; 1; 12	ZAN; 2; 13	SPA; 1	SPA; 2	HUN; 1; 10	HUN; 2; 21	ASS; 1	ASS; 2	MNZ; 1	MNZ; 2	CAT; 1	CAT; 2	27th	1
