= Csaba Tóth (racing driver) =

Hungarian racing driver

- Nationality: Hungarian
- Born: 7 October 1967 (age 59) Nagykáta, Hungary

TCR International Series career
- Debut season: 2017
- Current team: Zengő Motorsport
- Car number: 78
- Starts: 2

Previous series
- 2016: FIA Central European Zone Circuit Championship

Csaba Tóth (born 7 October 1967) is a Hungarian racing driver currently competing in the TCR International Series. Having previously competed in the FIA Central European Zone Circuit Championship.

== Racing career ==
Tóth began his career in 2016 in the FIA Central European Zone Circuit Championship, taking several podiums during the season. The first podium came at the Autodrom Most in the second Sprint race. This was followed by two more podiums at the Masaryk Circuit Sprint races.

In June 2017, it was announced that Tóth would race in the TCR International Series, driving a SEAT León TCR for Zengő Motorsport.

== Racing record ==
=== Complete TCR International Series results ===
(key) (Races in bold indicate pole position) (Races in italics indicate fastest lap)

Year	Team	Car	1	2	3	4	5	6	7	8	9	10	11	12	13	14	15	16	17	18	19	20	DC	Points
2017	Zengő Motorsport	SEAT León TCR	GEO; 1	GEO; 2	BHR; 1	BHR; 2	BEL; 1	BEL; 2	ITA; 1	ITA; 2	AUT; 1	AUT; 2	HUN; 1; 20	HUN; 2; 18	GER; 1	GER; 2	THA; 1	THA; 2	CHN; 1	CHN; 2	ABU; 1	ABU; 2	NC*	0*

^{†} Driver did not finish the race, but was classified as he completed over 90% of the race distance.
^{*} Season still in progress.
