= Ferenc Ficza =

Hungarian racing driver

- Nationality: (Hungary) Hungarian
- Born: 13 May 1996 (age 30) Szekszárd, Hungary

European Touring Car Cup career
- Debut season: 2012
- Current team: Zengő Motorsport
- Car number: 99
- Former teams: XFX Unicorse Team
- Starts: 17
- Wins: 1
- Poles: 1
- Fastest laps: 2
- Best finish: 8th in 2012 & 2013

Previous series
- 2015 2014 2009-10 2008: TCR International Series; SEAT León Eurocup; Hungarian Suzuki Bio Cup; Hungarian Touring Car Championship

Championship titles
- 2010: Hungarian Suzuki Bio Cup

Ferenc Ficza Jr. (born 13 May 1996) is a Hungarian racing driver currently competing in the European Touring Car Cup. He previously competed in the TCR International Series and SEAT León Eurocup.

== Racing career ==
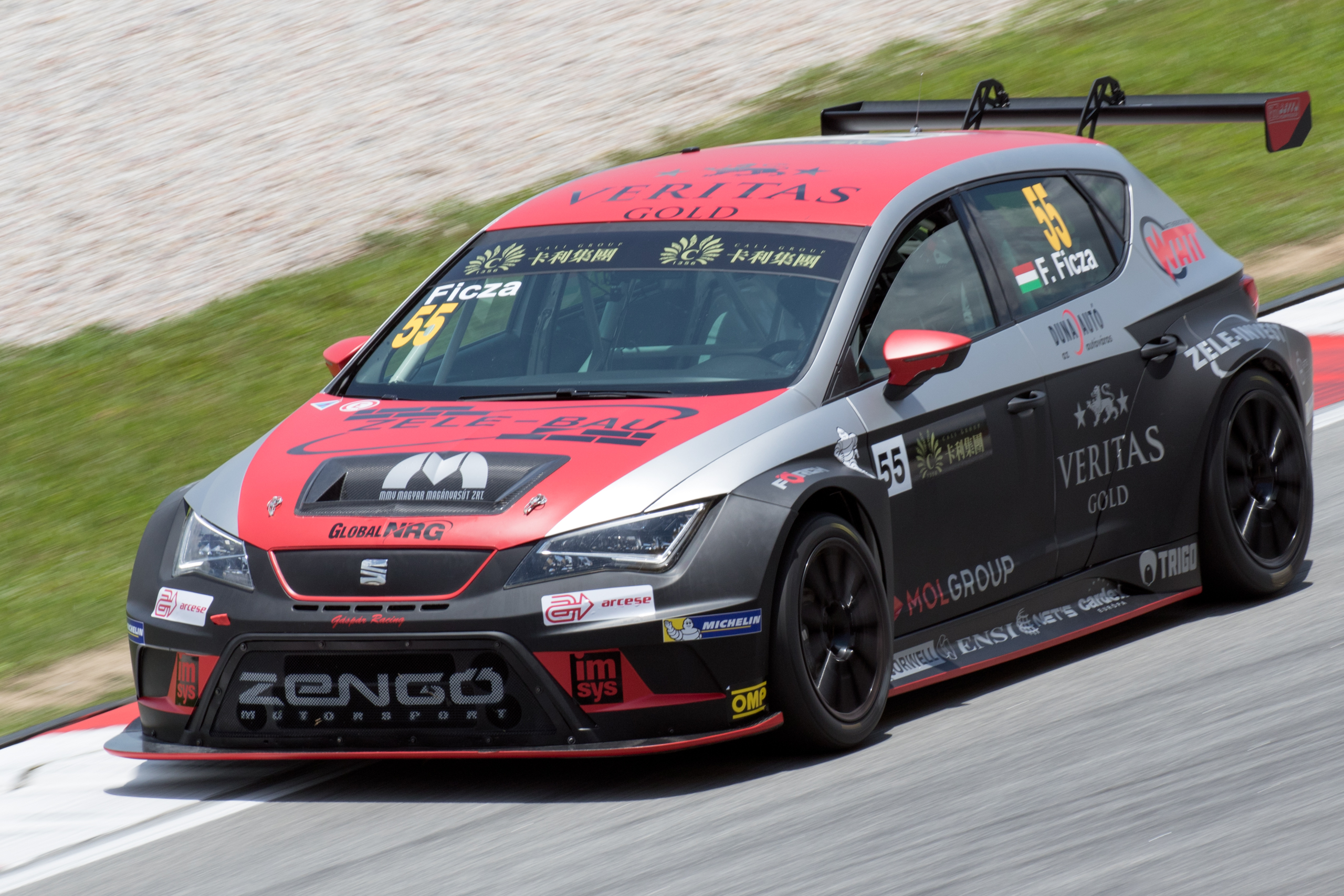
Ficza competing in the TCR International Series in 2015.

Ficza began his career in 2008 in the Hungarian Touring Car Championship. He switched to the Hungarian Suzuki Bio Cup in 2009, he won the championship in 2010. In 2012, Ficza made his European Touring Car Cup debut with XFX Unicorse Team, driving an Alfa Romeo 156. In 2013, he stayed in the European Touring Car Cup but switched to Zengő Motorsport, racing in the Single-makes Trophy. He finished eighth in the championship standings that year. In March 2015, it was announced that Ficza would make his TCR International Series debut with Zengő Motorsport driving a SEAT León Cup Racer. He later returned to the European Touring Car Cup.

== Racing record ==
=== Career summary ===
Season	Series	Team	Races	Wins	Poles	F/Laps	Podiums	Points	Position
2009	Suzuki Swift Cup Hungary	Sprint Motorsport	?	?	?	?	?	19	7th
2010	GENEX Suzuki Bio Kupa	RCM Motorsport	?	?	?	?	?	163	**1st**
2012	European Touring Car Cup - Super 2000	XFX Unicorse	4	0	0	0	1	19	8th
2013	European Touring Car Cup - Single-Make Trophy	Zengő Junior Team	9	0	1	1	2	29	8th
2014	SEAT León Eurocup	Gaspar Racing	12	1	1	0	4	51	6th
2015	European Touring Car Cup - Single-Make Trophy	Zengő Motorsport	4	1	0	1	2	18	7th
2015	TCR International Series	Zengő Motorsport	2	0	0	0	0	3	34th
2016	World Touring Car Championship	Zengő Motorsport	17	0	0	1	0	2	20th
2017	TCR International Series	Zele Racing	6	0	0	0	1	32	17th
2017	TCR International Series	Zengő Motorsport	6	0	0	0	0	32	17th
2018	TCR Europe Touring Car Series	Zengő Motorsport	2	0	0	0	0	2	25th
2020	Tourenwagen Meisterschaft Österreich - Div 1	Trevor Racing	6	0	0	0	2	72	**3rd**
2023	FIA European Rallycross Championship - RX3	EAK M-Sport KFT	1	0	N/A	N/A	0	10	17th

=== Complete TCR International Series results ===
(key) (Races in bold indicate pole position) (Races in italics indicate fastest lap)

Year	Team	Car	1	2	3	4	5	6	7	8	9	10	11	12	13	14	15	16	17	18	19	20	21	22	DC	Points
2015	Zengő Motorsport	SEAT León Cup Racer	SEP; 1; 9	SEP; 2; 10†	SHA; 1	SHA; 2	VAL; 1	VAL; 2	ALG; 1	ALG; 2	MNZ; 1	MNZ; 2	SAL; 1	SAL; 2	SOC; 1	SOC; 2	RBR; 1	RBR; 2	MRN; 1	MRN; 2	CHA; 1	CHA; 2	MAC; 1	MAC; 2	35th	3
2017	Zele Racing	SEAT León TCR	RIM; 1; 2	RIM; 2; 13†	BHR; 1; 11	**BHR**; **2**; 6			MNZ; 1; 10	MNZ; 2; 10															17th	32
2017	Zengő Motorsport	SEAT León TCR					SPA; 1; 13	SPA; 2; 14			SAL; 1 WD	SAL; 2 WD													17th	32
2017	Zengő Motorsport	Kia Cee'd TCR											HUN; 1; 19	HUN; 2; 14	OSC; 1; 12	OSC; 2; 10	CHA; 1	CHA; 2	CHN; 1	CHN; 2	DUB; 1	DUB; 2			17th	32

^{†} Driver did not finish the race, but was classified as he completed over 90% of the race distance.

=== Complete World Touring Car Championship results ===
(key) (Races in bold indicate pole position) (Races in italics indicate fastest lap)

Year	Team	Car	1	2	3	4	5	6	7	8	9	10	11	12	13	14	15	16	17	18	19	20	21	22	DC	Points
2016	Zengő Motorsport	Honda Civic WTCC	FRA; 1 WD	FRA; 2 WD	SVK; 1 Ret	SVK; 2 DNS	HUN; 1 DSQ	HUN; 2 DSQ	MAR; 1 DSQ	MAR; 2 DSQ	GER; 1; 12	GER; 2; 13	RUS; 1; 15	RUS; 2; 9	POR; 1; 14	POR; 2; 15	ARG; 1 WD	ARG; 2 WD	JPN; 1; 18	JPN; 2; 18	CHN; 1; 14	CHN; 2; 16	QAT; 1; 13	QAT; 2; 11	20th	2

=== Complete TCR Europe Series results ===
(key) (Races in bold indicate pole position) (Races in italics indicate fastest lap)

Year	Team	Car	1	2	3	4	5	6	7	8	9	10	11	12	13	14	DC	Points
2018	Zengő Motorsport	CUPRA León TCR	LEC; 1	LEC; 2	ZAN; 1	ZAN; 2	SPA; 1	SPA; 2	HUN; 1 Ret	HUN; 2; 9	ASS; 1	ASS; 2	MNZ; 1	MNZ; 2	CAT; 1	CAT; 2	25th	2
