= DG Sport Compétition =

Belgian auto racing team

(Belgium) DG Sport Compétition
- Founded: 2013
- Team principal(s): Christian Jupsin
- Current series: World Touring Car Cup; Belgian Rally Championship
- Former series: European Rally Championship; TCR International Series; TCR Benelux Series
- Noted drivers: WTCR; 7. (France) Aurélien Comte; 70. (Slovakia) Maťo Homola
- Drivers' Championships: 2016 (Pierre-Yves Corthals); 2017 (Aurélien Comte)
- Website: http://www.dgsportcompetition.eu/

DG Sport
- Type: Sprl
- Industry: Automotive industry
- Founded: April 3, 2008; 18 years ago in Theux, Liège, Belgium
- Founders: Louis-Philippe Guyot; Christian Jupsin; Graziella Sablone
- Headquarters: Avenue du Stade 27, Theux, Belgium
- Operating income: ▲€ 30.633 (2015)
- Net income: ▲€ 20.968 (2015)
- Total assets: ▼€ 1.115.719 (2015)
- Total equity: € 25.000 (2015)
- Owners: Florian Jupsin; Benjamin Bourguignon; Carolane Jupsin
- Number of employees: ▲4 (2015)

DG Sport Compétition is a Belgian auto racing team based in Theux, Belgium. The team has raced in the TCR International Series, since 2017. The also races in the TCR Benelux Touring Car Championship and Belgian Rally Championship. Having previously rallied in the European Rally Championship.

== TCR Benelux Touring Car Championship ==
Having first entered the championship in 2016, running a single Opel Astra TCR. The team finished second in the drivers championship with drivers Pierre-Yves Corthals and Frédéric Caprasse, as well as finishing third in the teams' championship. The team took six victories and seventeen podium finishes. They returned in 2017 running an Opel Astra TCR for Maťo Homola and 2016 driver Frédéric Caprasse and a Peugeot 308 Racing Cup for Aurélien Comte and Kevin Abbring.

== TCR International Series ==
=== Opel Astra TCR (2017) ===
After having raced in the TCR Benelux Touring Car Championship, the team entered the 2017 TCR International Series with 2016 TCR Trophy Europe champion Pierre-Yves Corthals and Maťo Homola driving an Opel Astra TCR each. Homola took the team's first pole position in the series, in the second round held in Bahrain, with Corthals qualifying in second position.

== World Touring Car Cup ==
=== Peugeot 308 TCR ===
The team entered the 2018 World Touring Car Cup with two Peugeot 308 TCR cars for 2017 TCR Trophy Europe winner Aurélien Comte and Maťo Homola. Comte scored the only win for the team in the second race at the Circuit Zandvoort.
