= Romeo Ferraris =

Italian racing team

(Italy) Romeo Ferraris
- Founded: 1959
- Team principal(s): Mario Ferraris; Michela Cerruti
- Founder(s): Romeo Ferraris
- Current series: World Touring Car Cup eTouring Car World Cup
- Former series: Superstars Series; Italian Touring Car Championship; TCR International Series
- Noted drivers: WTCR; 52. (Italy) Luca Filippi; 69. (France) Jean-Karl Vernay
- Teams' Championships: 2003 European Superdiesel Challenge
- Website: https://www.romeoferraris.com/

Romeo Ferraris is an Italian tuning and auto racing team based in Milan, Italy. The team has raced in the TCR International Series, since 2016, and in the FIA ETCR – eTouring Car World Cup, since 2021. Previously the team had raced in the Superstars Series and the Italian Touring Car Championship, amongst others.

== Early years ==
=== 1959–1973 ===
After being founded by Romeo Ferraris in 1959, the team went on to race in the Italian Touring Car Championship in 1965. The team took several wins and podiums from 1965–72, also participating in the World Speedboat Record in 1970. The team also took a two victories in the Italian Prototype Championship in 1972 & 1973.

=== 1975–1993 ===
Having made the switch to the Italian Inboard Championship for the 1975 season, the team raced in the championship up until 1977. Participating in another World Speedboat Record in 1978 and 1979 with a diesel-engined boat. Continuing with boat racing through to 1993, taking several victories and podium finishes along the way.

=== 1994–2014 ===
After many years away from Track racing, the team returned to track with a historic racing prepared Ford Mustang. The team also supplied the Nuova F.500 Trophy with engines from 1994–95. For 1996 the team made a return to boat racing, taking part in the World Speedboat Record once again. However, the team didn't stop track racing and raced an Alfa Romeo Giulietta that year. In 2002 the team began racing in the European Superdiesel Challenge, taking several victories and podiums up until 2007, even taking the championship title in 2003.

Continuing with touring cars in 2008 in the Campionato Italiano Turismo Endurance (formerly the Italian Touring Car Championship), as well as taking on the Italian GT Championship. Taking many wins and podiums through to 2010, when they joined the Superstars Series and the Superstars GTSprint Series, also taking wins and podiums in these championships through to 2014. In 2012 the team took part in the Peugeot RCZ Racing Cup taking a single victory. Returning to the Campionato Italiano Turismo Endurance in 2015, saw the team take one win and several podiums.

In 2012, Michela Cerruti and Valentina Albanese finished second in the Circuit Hero 500 km Endurance Race at Zhuhai International Circuit, with Romeo Ferraris being the only European racing team participating. In March 2013 at the Pan Delta Super Racing Festival in Zhuhai, Romeo Ferraris participated with a Mercedes C63 AMG prepared according to the technical regulation of the Superstars Series. Driver Mario Ferraris took the car to two wins.

== TCR International Series ==
=== Alfa Romeo Giulietta TCR (2016–) ===
In 2014, the Italian tuning garage Romeo Ferraris started to work, without the marques help, in the Alfa Romeo Giulietta to race in TCR International Series in 2015. Having first announced their participation in the 2015 Guia Race of Macau, the team later withdrew, due to not having enough time to test the car. The team started an extensive testing program shortly after completing the first car, the car was tested by Salvatore Tavano and Michela Cerruti at several Italian race tracks, not far from the team's base in Milano. Appearing under the banner of Mulsanne Racing, Michela Cerruti drove the first two races of the 2016 season. They returned in the 5th round in Salzburgring with a second car for Petř Fulín and a new color scheme, staying in the championship until the end of the year with two cars.

In 2017, Davit Kajaia and Dusan Borković joined forces with Romeo Ferraris and raced the full TCR-season as GE-Force, taking three victories in Georgia, Bahrain and Salzburgring.

In 2018, mostly because WTCC and TCR Internacional became one, the team Mulsanne Racing entered the World Touring Car Cup (WTCR) with two Alfa Romeo Giulietta QV for the two Alfa Romeo legends Gianni Morbidelli, which raced until Vila Real being replaced by Kevin Ceccon (who scored a race win in Suzuka), and Fabrizio Giovanardi, who was replaced in the Suzuka round by Luigi "Gigi" Ferrara (2nd overall in TCR Italy 2018).

For the 2019 season, the car received a major aerodynamic upgrade being renamed as "Alfa Romeo Giulietta Veloce". Team Mulsanne maintained Ceccon and hired Ma Qing Hua (ex-Formula E and WTCC driver). Alongside the World Cup cars, Romeo Ferraris will have about 8-10 Giuliettas racing in TCR Italy, UK, USA, Australia and China.

After initial rumours that the team would withdraw from WTCR and move to the Electric TCR series, it was announced that the team would run a single entry in 2020 season for Jean-Karl Vernay.

=== Alfa Romeo Giulia ETCR (2021–) ===
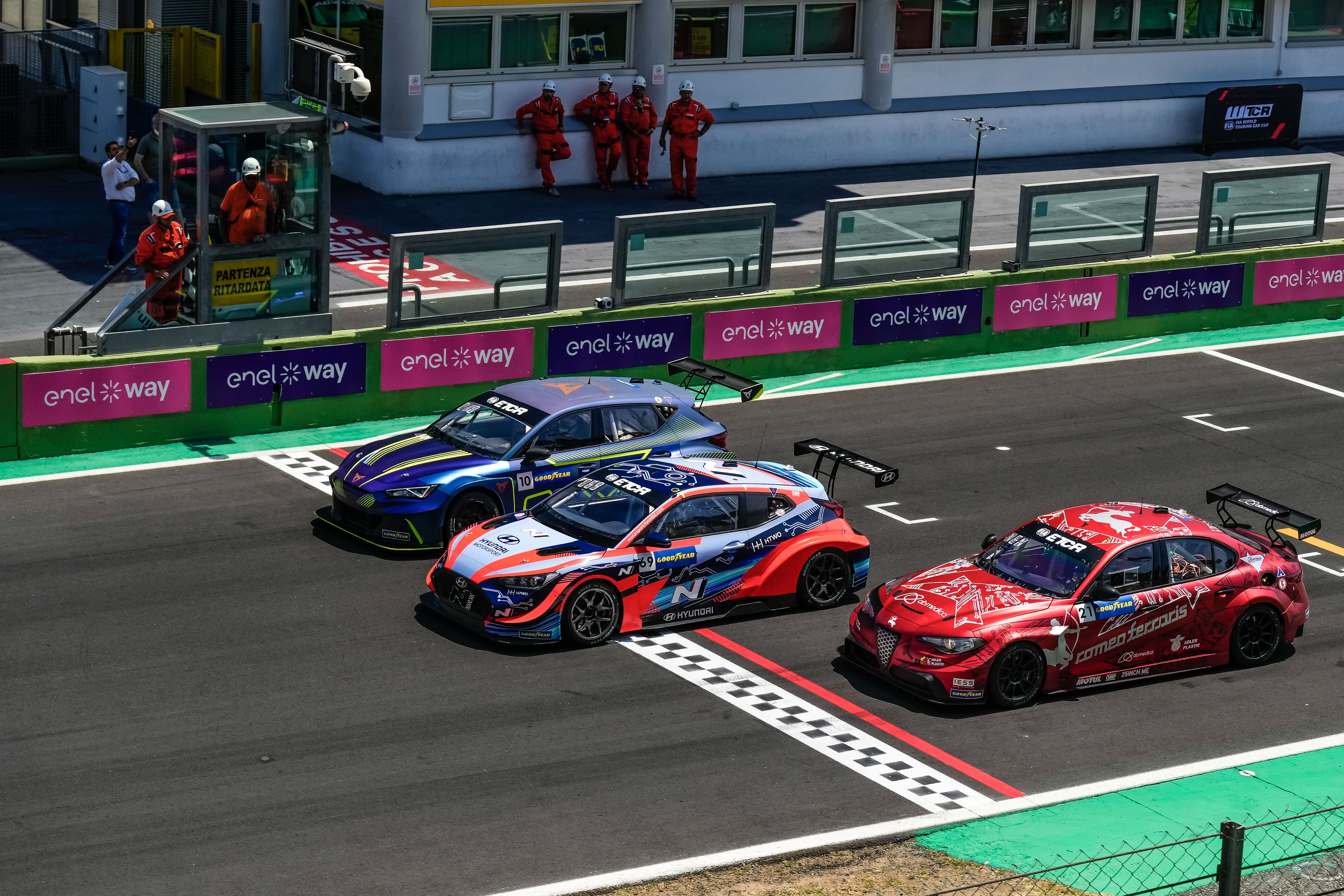
Giulia ETCR of Romeo Ferraris team (right) lined up with the Cupra e-Racer (left) and Veloster N ETCR (centre)

Since the inaugural season in 2021, the team have raced in the FIA ETCR – eTouring Car World Cup (originally PURE ETCR) series with the Alfa Romeo Giulia ETCR. In December 2019, Romeo Ferraris announced they would cooperate with Hexathron Racing System to develop and build Giulia-based electric touring cars for the nascent series. Operations manager Michela Cerruti and driver Jean-Karl Vernay unveiled the car at MotorLand Aragon in November 2020. The final racing configuration, integrating the mandated battery, was shown at Autodromo Vallelunga in March 2021.

Jean-Karl Vernay was announced as the first driver for the inaugural 2021 season, but after he was poached by Hyundai, Stefano Coletti, Oliver Webb, Luca Filippi, and Rodrigo Baptista were named the drivers instead. Philipp Eng replaced Coletti ahead of Round 3 at the Copenhagen Historic Grand Prix. For Round 4 at the Hungaroring, Luigi Ferrara drove in Webb's place, as Webb was competing in the 24 Hours of Le Mans race that weekend. Baptista was the team's top driver for the 2021 season, placing fifth overall in the drivers' championship, starting all five rounds with one podium finish (third place in Round 2 at MotorLand Aragón). The team finished second overall.

For the 2022 season, Romeo Ferraris announced they would field four drivers: Maxime Martin, Luca Filippi, Bruno Spengler, and Giovanni Venturini, with Filippi the sole returning driver from 2021.
