= Duncan Ende =

American racing driver (born 1985)

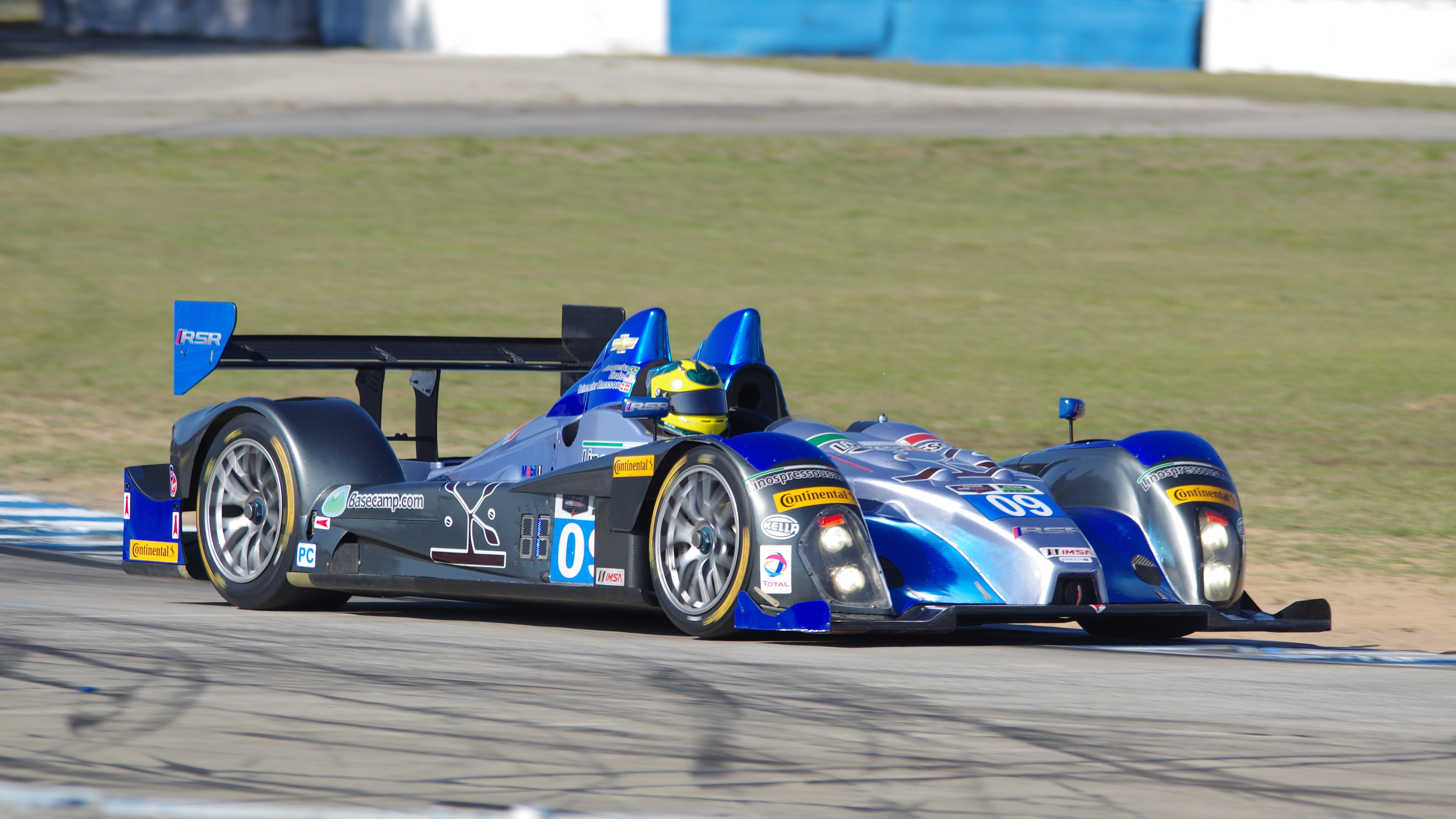
- Ende at the 2014 Sebring 12 Hours.
- Nationality: (United States) American
- Born: 19 February 1985 (age 41) Los Angeles, California, U.S.

TCR International Series career
- Debut season: 2017
- Current team: Icarus Motorsports
- Categorisation: FIA Silver (until 2019); FIA Bronze (2020–)
- Car number: 18
- Starts: 18
- Wins: 0
- Poles: 0
- Fastest laps: 0
- Best finish: 28th in 2017

Previous series
- 2014 2013, 15-16 2010-13 2010 2008-09 2006 2006 2005: United SportsCar Championship; Pirelli World Challenge; American Le Mans Series; Continental Tire Sports Car Challenge; Rolex Sports Car Series; IMSA Lites; Champ Car Atlantic; Skip Barber Western Regional Series

Duncan Ende (born 19 February 1985) is an American racing driver currently competing in the TCR International Series. Having previously competed in the United SportsCar Championship, Pirelli World Challenge, American Le Mans Series and Continental Tire Sports Car Challenge amongst others.

== Racing career ==
Ende began his career in 2005 in the Skip Barber Western Regional Series, finishing second in the standings. In 2006, he raced in both the Champ Car Atlantic series and the IMSA Lites, finishing thirty-sixth and second in the standings respectively. For 2008, he switched to the Rolex Sports Car Series, he raced there for many seasons, finishing seventh in the GS standings in 2009, he took one win and three podiums that year. He switched to the Continental Tire Sports Car Challenge and American Le Mans Series for 2010, winning the 2010 Petit Le Mans, on his way to finishing thirteenth in the standings. He continued in the American Le Mans Series for 2011, racing there for up until 2013, with his best championship finish being second in the GTC standings in 2011. He switched to the Pirelli World Challenge for 2013, he took one podium before finishing seventh in the standings. He also raced there in 2015 and 2016. For 2014, he raced in the United SportsCar Championship LMPC class, taking three podiums on his way to finishing tenth in the LMPC standings.

In February 2017, it was announced that Ende would race in the TCR International Series, driving a SEAT León TCR for his own Icarus Motorsports.

== Racing record ==
=== Complete TCR International Series results ===
(key) (Races in bold indicate pole position) (Races in italics indicate fastest lap)

Year	Team	Car	1	2	3	4	5	6	7	8	9	10	11	12	13	14	15	16	17	18	19	20	DC	Points
2017	Icarus Motorsports	SEAT León TCR	RIM; 1; 14	RIM; 2; 11	BHR; 1; 15	BHR; 2; 14	SPA; 1; 22	SPA; 2; 17	MNZ; 1 WD	MNZ; 2 WD	SAL; 1; 18†	SAL; 2 Ret	HUN; 1 Ret	HUN; 2 Ret	OSC; 1; 13	OSC; 2; 7	CHA; 1; 13	CHA; 2; 15	ZHE; 1; 17	ZHE; 2; 11	DUB; 1; 11	DUB; 2; 14	28th	9

^{†} Driver did not finish the race, but was classified as he completed over 90% of the race distance.
