= 2015 TCR International Series Red Bull Ring round =

(Austria) 2015 TCR International Series Red Bull Ring round
Round details
- Round 8 of 11 rounds in the 2015 TCR International Series
- Layout of the Red Bull Ring
- Location: Red Bull Ring, Spielberg, Austria
- Course: Permanent racing facility 4.326 km (2.688 mi)

TCR International Series

Race 1
- Date: 12 July 2015
- Laps: 14

Pole position
Driver	(Italy) Gianni Morbidelli	WestCoast Racing
- Time: 1:39.716

Podium
First	(Switzerland) Stefano Comini	Target Competition
Second	(Italy) Andrea Belicchi	Target Competition
Third	(Spain) Pepe Oriola	Team Craft-Bamboo Lukoil

Fastest lap
Driver	(Italy) Gianni Morbidelli	WestCoast Racing
- Time: 1:39.764 (on lap 11)

Race 2
- Date: 12 July 2015
- Laps: 14

Podium
First	(Spain) Pol Rosell	Liqui Moly Team Engstler
Second	(Spain) Pepe Oriola	Team Craft-Bamboo Lukoil
Third	(Spain) Jordi Gené	Team Craft-Bamboo Lukoil

Fastest lap
Driver	(Russia) Sergey Afanasyev	Team Craft-Bamboo Lukoil
- Time: 1:40.917 (on lap 12)

The 2015 TCR International Series Red Bull Ring round was the eighth round of the 2015 TCR International Series season. It took place on 12 July at the Red Bull Ring. This round was to be held at Autódromo Juan y Oscar Gálvez on 26 July, but it was later moved due to organisational problems.

Stefano Comini won the first race, starting from fourth position, driving a SEAT León Cup Racer, and Pol Rosell gained the second one, driving a Volkswagen Golf TCR.

== Success Ballast ==
Due to the results obtained in the previous round, Jordi Gené received +30 kg, Pepe Oriola +20 kg and Stefano Comini +10 kg.

== Classification ==
=== Qualifying ===
Pos.	No.	Driver	Car	Team	Q1	Q2	Grid	Points
1	10	(Italy) Gianni Morbidelli	Honda Civic Type R TCR (FK2)	(Sweden) WestCoast Racing	1:41.078	1:39.716	1	5
2	24	(United States) Kevin Gleason	Honda Civic Type R TCR (FK2)	(Sweden) WestCoast Racing	1:41.336	1:40.335	2	4
3	43	(Hungary) Dániel Nagy	SEAT León Cup Racer	(Hungary) Zengő Motorsport	1:41.758^{1}	1:40.567	3	3
4	25	(Switzerland) Stefano Comini	SEAT León Cup Racer	(Italy) Target Competition	1:40.798	1:40.634	4	2
5	77	(Russia) Sergey Afanasyev	SEAT León Cup Racer	(United Kingdom) Team Craft-Bamboo Lukoil	1:41.456	1:40.714	5	1
6	74	(Spain) Pepe Oriola	SEAT León Cup Racer	(United Kingdom) Team Craft-Bamboo Lukoil	1:41.502	1:40.719	6	
7	33	(Italy) Andrea Belicchi	SEAT León Cup Racer	(Italy) Target Competition	1:41.064	1:40.755	7	
8	88	(Spain) Jordi Gené	SEAT León Cup Racer	(United Kingdom) Team Craft-Bamboo Lukoil	1:41.204	1:40.974	8	
9	8	(Russia) Mikhail Grachev	Volkswagen Golf TCR	(Germany) Liqui Moly Team Engstler	1:41.202	1:40.988	9	
10	42	(Spain) Pol Rosell	Volkswagen Golf TCR	(Germany) Liqui Moly Team Engstler	1:41.220	1:41.097	10	
11	20	(Ukraine) Igor Skuz	Honda Civic Type R TCR (FK2)	(Sweden) WestCoast Racing	1:41.543	1:41.322	11	
12	7	(Italy) Lorenzo Veglia	SEAT León Cup Racer	(Germany) Liqui Moly Team Engstler	1:41.684	1:41.532	12	
13	41	(Italy) Michela Cerruti	SEAT León Cup Racer	(Italy) Target Competition	1:42.881		13	
14	40	(Monaco) Gabriele Marotta	SEAT León Cup Racer	(Italy) Target Competition	1:44.942		14	
15	72	(Italy) Diego Romanini	Ford Focus ST	(Italy) Proteam Racing	1:51.842		15^{2}	

Notes:

- ^1 — Dániel Nagy's best lap time in Q1 was deleted because it was obtained with yellow flags.
- ^2 — Diego Romanini was moved to the back of the grid for having not set a time within the 107% limit.

=== Race 1 ===
Pos.	No.	Driver	Car	Team	Laps	Time/Retired	Grid	Points
1	25	(Switzerland) Stefano Comini	SEAT León Cup Racer	(Italy) Target Competition	14	23:51.673	4	25
2	33	(Italy) Andrea Belicchi	SEAT León Cup Racer	(Italy) Target Competition	14	+0.565	7	18
3	74	(Spain) Pepe Oriola	SEAT León Cup Racer	(United Kingdom) Team Craft-Bamboo Lukoil	14	+0.657	6	15
4	88	(Spain) Jordi Gené	SEAT León Cup Racer	(United Kingdom) Team Craft-Bamboo Lukoil	14	+5.122	8	12
5	24	(United States) Kevin Gleason	Honda Civic Type R TCR (FK2)	(Sweden) WestCoast Racing	14	+5.382	2	10
6	77	(Russia) Sergey Afanasyev	SEAT León Cup Racer	(United Kingdom) Team Craft-Bamboo Lukoil	14	+6.428	5	8
7	8	(Russia) Mikhail Grachev	Volkswagen Golf TCR	(Germany) Liqui Moly Team Engstler	14	+6.768	9	6
8	7	(Italy) Lorenzo Veglia	SEAT León Cup Racer	(Germany) Liqui Moly Team Engstler	14	+8.395	11	4
9	42	(Spain) Pol Rosell	Volkswagen Golf TCR	(Germany) Liqui Moly Team Engstler	14	+8.703	10	2
10	41	(Italy) Michela Cerruti	SEAT León Cup Racer	(Italy) Target Competition	14	+17.685	12	1
11	10	(Italy) Gianni Morbidelli	Honda Civic Type R TCR (FK2)	(Sweden) WestCoast Racing	14	+29.379^{3}	1	
12	20	(Ukraine) Igor Skuz	Honda Civic Type R TCR (FK2)	(Sweden) WestCoast Racing	14	+54.025	14^{4}	
13	40	(Monaco) Gabriele Marotta	SEAT León Cup Racer	(Italy) Target Competition	13	+1 lap	13	
Ret	72	(Italy) Diego Romanini	Ford Focus ST	(Italy) Proteam Racing	6	Spin	15	
Ret	43	(Hungary) Dániel Nagy	SEAT León Cup Racer	(Hungary) Zengő Motorsport	0	Accident	3	

Notes:

- ^3 — Gianni Morbidelli was given a 30-second penalty for unsportsmanlike drive.
- ^4 — Igor Skuz was given a five-place grid penalty for causing a collision with Bas Schouten in the Salzburgring round.

=== Race 2 ===
Pos.	No.	Driver	Car	Team	Laps	Time/Retired	Grid	Points
1	42	(Spain) Pol Rosell	Volkswagen Golf TCR	(Germany) Liqui Moly Team Engstler	14	23:45.394	1	25
2	74	(Spain) Pepe Oriola	SEAT León Cup Racer	(United Kingdom) Team Craft-Bamboo Lukoil	14	+0.380	5	18
3	88	(Spain) Jordi Gené	SEAT León Cup Racer	(United Kingdom) Team Craft-Bamboo Lukoil	14	+1.473	3	15
4	77	(Russia) Sergey Afanasyev	SEAT León Cup Racer	(United Kingdom) Team Craft-Bamboo Lukoil	14	+3.701	6	12
5	24	(United States) Kevin Gleason	Honda Civic Type R TCR (FK2)	(Sweden) WestCoast Racing	14	+4.965	9	10
6	8	(Russia) Mikhail Grachev	Volkswagen Golf TCR	(Germany) Liqui Moly Team Engstler	14	+13.338	2	8
7	7	(Italy) Lorenzo Veglia	SEAT León Cup Racer	(Germany) Liqui Moly Team Engstler	14	+15.612	12	6
8	41	(Italy) Michela Cerruti	SEAT León Cup Racer	(Italy) Target Competition	14	+16.315	13	4
9	25	(Switzerland) Stefano Comini	SEAT León Cup Racer	(Italy) Target Competition	14	+1:05.927	7	2
10	40	(Monaco) Gabriele Marotta	SEAT León Cup Racer	(Italy) Target Competition	14	+1:43.533	14	1
11	33	(Italy) Andrea Belicchi	SEAT León Cup Racer	(Italy) Target Competition	11	Technical	4	
Ret	72	(Italy) Diego Romanini	Ford Focus ST	(Italy) Proteam Racing	7	Technical	15	
Ret	10	(Italy) Gianni Morbidelli	Honda Civic Type R TCR (FK2)	(Sweden) WestCoast Racing	5	Collision	10	
Ret	20	(Ukraine) Igor Skuz	Honda Civic Type R TCR (FK2)	(Sweden) WestCoast Racing	4	Accident	11	
DNS	43	(Hungary) Dániel Nagy	SEAT León Cup Racer	(Hungary) Zengő Motorsport		Accident	8	

== Standings after the event ==
Drivers' Championship standings

	Pos	Driver	Points
1	1	(Spain) Pepe Oriola	225
1	2	(Switzerland) Stefano Comini	223
1	3	(Spain) Jordi Gené	201
1	4	(Italy) Gianni Morbidelli	186
	5	(Italy) Andrea Belicchi	164

Teams' Championship standings

Pos	Driver	Points
1	(Italy) Target Competition	484
2	(United Kingdom) Team Craft-Bamboo Lukoil	470
3	(Sweden) WestCoast Racing	395
4	(Germany) Liqui Moly Team Engstler	234
5	(Spain) Campos Racing	41

- Note: Only the top five positions are included for both sets of drivers' standings.
