= 2015 TCR International Series Monza round =

(Italy) 2015 TCR International Series Monza round
Round details
- Round 5 of 11 rounds in the 2015 TCR International Series
- Layout of the Autodromo Nazionale di Monza
- Location: Autodromo Nazionale di Monza, Monza, Italy
- Course: Permanent racing facility 5.793 km (3.600 mi)

TCR International Series

Race 1
- Date: 24 May 2015
- Laps: 11

Pole position
Driver	(Italy) Gianni Morbidelli	WestCoast Racing
- Time: 2:00.353

Podium
First	(Italy) Gianni Morbidelli	WestCoast Racing
Second	(Spain) Pepe Oriola	Team Craft-Bamboo Lukoil
Third	(Italy) Andrea Belicchi	Target Competition

Fastest lap
Driver	(United States) Kevin Gleason	WestCoast Racing
- Time: 2:01.523 (on lap 9)

Race 2
- Date: 24 May 2015
- Laps: 11

Podium
First	(Italy) Gianni Morbidelli	WestCoast Racing
Second	(Spain) Jordi Gené	Team Craft-Bamboo Lukoil
Third	(Spain) Fernando Monje	Campos Racing

Fastest lap
Driver	(United States) Kevin Gleason	WestCoast Racing
- Time: 2:01.311 (on lap 4)

The 2015 TCR International Series Monza round was the fifth round of the 2015 TCR International Series season. It took place on 24 May at the Autodromo Nazionale di Monza.

Gianni Morbidelli won both races, driving a Honda Civic Type R TCR (FK2).

== Success Ballast ==
Due to the results obtained in the previous round, Jordi Gené received +30 kg, Nicki Thiim +20 kg and Michel Nykjær +10 kg. Nevertheless, Thiim didn't take part at this event, so he would have taken the ballast at the first round he would have participated.

== Classification ==
=== Qualifying ===
Pos.	No.	Driver	Car	Team	Q1	Q2	Grid	Points
1	10	(Italy) Gianni Morbidelli	Honda Civic Type R TCR (FK2)	(Sweden) WestCoast Racing	2:01.737	2:00.353	1	5
2	25	(Switzerland) Stefano Comini	SEAT León Cup Racer	(Italy) Target Competition	2:01.782	2:01.080	2	4
3	74	(Spain) Pepe Oriola	SEAT León Cup Racer	(United Kingdom) Team Craft-Bamboo Lukoil	2:02.051	2:01.121	3	3
4	77	(Russia) Sergey Afanasyev	SEAT León Cup Racer	(United Kingdom) Team Craft-Bamboo Lukoil	2:02.473	2:01.382	4	2
5	33	(Italy) Andrea Belicchi	SEAT León Cup Racer	(Italy) Target Competition	2:01.884	2:01.762	5	1
6	22	(Spain) Fernando Monje	Opel Astra OPC	(Spain) Campos Racing	2:02.069	2:01.785	6	
7	20	(Ukraine) Igor Skuz	Honda Civic Type R TCR (FK2)	(Sweden) WestCoast Racing	2:02.449	2:01.800	7	
8	88	(Spain) Jordi Gené	SEAT León Cup Racer	(United Kingdom) Team Craft-Bamboo Lukoil	2:02.128	2:01.859	8	
9	36	(Italy) Antonio D'Amico	SEAT León Cup Racer	(Italy) B.D. Racing	2:03.066	2:01.059	9	
10	8	(Russia) Mikhail Grachev	SEAT León Cup Racer	(Germany) Liqui Moly Team Engstler	2:02.286	2:02.190	10	
11	7	(Italy) Lorenzo Veglia	SEAT León Cup Racer	(Germany) Liqui Moly Team Engstler	2:02.509	2:02.338	11	
12	17	(Denmark) Michel Nykjær	SEAT León Cup Racer	(Italy) Target Competition	2:02.038	2:02.443	12	
13	46	(Hungary) Zsolt Szabó	SEAT León Cup Racer	(Hungary) Zengő Motorsport	2:06.582		13	
14	71	(United Kingdom) Tom Boardman	Ford Focus ST	(Italy) Proteam Racing	2:08.201		14	
15	24	(United States) Kevin Gleason	Honda Civic Type R TCR (FK2)	(Sweden) WestCoast Racing	2:20.768		15	
16	90	(Italy) Davide Roda	SEAT León Cup Racer	(Hungary) Zengő Motorsport	no time		16	

=== Race 1 ===
Pos.	No.	Driver	Car	Team	Laps	Time/Retired	Grid	Points
1	10	(Italy) Gianni Morbidelli	Honda Civic Type R TCR (FK2)	(Sweden) WestCoast Racing	11	22:31.918	1	25
2	74	(Spain) Pepe Oriola	SEAT León Cup Racer	(United Kingdom) Team Craft-Bamboo Lukoil	11	+1.198	3	18
3	33	(Italy) Andrea Belicchi	SEAT León Cup Racer	(Italy) Target Competition	11	+3.504	5	15
4	88	(Spain) Jordi Gené	SEAT León Cup Racer	(United Kingdom) Team Craft-Bamboo Lukoil	11	+3.884	8	12
5	22	(Spain) Fernando Monje	Opel Astra OPC	(Spain) Campos Racing	11	+5.056	6	10
6	24	(United States) Kevin Gleason	Honda Civic Type R TCR (FK2)	(Sweden) WestCoast Racing	11	+5.702	15	8
7	7	(Italy) Lorenzo Veglia	SEAT León Cup Racer	(Germany) Liqui Moly Team Engstler	11	+12.037	11	6
8	46	(Hungary) Zsolt Szabó	SEAT León Cup Racer	(Hungary) Zengő Motorsport	11	+20.160	13	4
9	36	(Italy) Antonio D'Amico	SEAT León Cup Racer	(Italy) B.D. Racing	11	+20.748	9	2
10	71	(United Kingdom) Tom Boardman	Ford Focus ST	(Italy) Proteam Racing	11	+1:08.621	14	1
11	77	(Russia) Sergey Afanasyev	SEAT León Cup Racer	(United Kingdom) Team Craft-Bamboo Lukoil	10	+1 lap	4	
12	8	(Russia) Mikhail Grachev	SEAT León Cup Racer	(Germany) Liqui Moly Team Engstler	9	Collision	10	
13	17	(Denmark) Michel Nykjær	SEAT León Cup Racer	(Italy) Target Competition	9	Collision	12	
Ret	25	(Switzerland) Stefano Comini	SEAT León Cup Racer	(Italy) Target Competition	8	Accident	2	
Ret	20	(Ukraine) Igor Skuz	Honda Civic Type R TCR (FK2)	(Sweden) WestCoast Racing	7	Brakes	7	
DNS	90	(Italy) Davide Roda	SEAT León Cup Racer	(Hungary) Zengő Motorsport		Accident	16	

=== Race 2 ===
Pos.	No.	Driver	Car	Team	Laps	Time/Retired	Grid	Points
1	10	(Italy) Gianni Morbidelli	Honda Civic Type R TCR (FK2)	(Sweden) WestCoast Racing	11	22:37.847	7	25
2	88	(Spain) Jordi Gené	SEAT León Cup Racer	(United Kingdom) Team Craft-Bamboo Lukoil	11	+2.717	2	18
3	22	(Spain) Fernando Monje	Opel Astra OPC	(Spain) Campos Racing	11	+3.931	4	15
4	25	(Switzerland) Stefano Comini	SEAT León Cup Racer	(Italy) Target Competition	11	+6.499	12^{1}	12
5	33	(Italy) Andrea Belicchi	SEAT León Cup Racer	(Italy) Target Competition	11	+6.541	5	10
6	20	(Ukraine) Igor Skuz	Honda Civic Type R TCR (FK2)	(Sweden) WestCoast Racing	11	+6.753	3	8
7	46	(Hungary) Zsolt Szabó	SEAT León Cup Racer	(Hungary) Zengő Motorsport	11	+10.129	9	6
8	7	(Italy) Lorenzo Veglia	SEAT León Cup Racer	(Germany) Liqui Moly Team Engstler	11	+13.442	8	4
9	8	(Russia) Mikhail Grachev	SEAT León Cup Racer	(Germany) Liqui Moly Team Engstler	11	+20.651	14^{1}	2
10	36	(Italy) Antonio D'Amico	SEAT León Cup Racer	(Italy) B.D. Racing	11	+23.188	1	1
11	71	(United Kingdom) Tom Boardman	Ford Focus ST	(Italy) Proteam Racing	10	+1 lap	10	
Ret	74	(Spain) Pepe Oriola	SEAT León Cup Racer	(United Kingdom) Team Craft-Bamboo Lukoil	6	Accident	6	
Ret	24	(United States) Kevin Gleason	Honda Civic Type R TCR (FK2)	(Sweden) WestCoast Racing	6	Accident	11	
DNS	17	(Denmark) Michel Nykjær	SEAT León Cup Racer	(Italy) Target Competition		Collision	13^{1}	
DNS	77	(Russia) Sergey Afanasyev	SEAT León Cup Racer	(United Kingdom) Team Craft-Bamboo Lukoil		Collision	15^{1}	
DNS	90	(Italy) Davide Roda	SEAT León Cup Racer	(Hungary) Zengő Motorsport		Accident	16	

Notes:

- ^1 — Stefano Comini, Michel Nykjær, Mikhail Grachev and Sergey Afanasyev were moved to the back of the grid because of a parc fermé infringement.

== Standings after the event ==
Drivers' Championship standings

	Pos	Driver	Points
2	1	(Italy) Gianni Morbidelli	146
1	2	(Switzerland) Stefano Comini	132
1	3	(Spain) Pepe Oriola	125
	4	(Spain) Jordi Gené	120
1	5	(Italy) Andrea Belicchi	102

Teams' Championship standings

	Pos	Driver	Points
	1	(Italy) Target Competition	290
	2	(United Kingdom) Team Craft-Bamboo Lukoil	275
	3	(Sweden) WestCoast Racing	265
	4	(Germany) Liqui Moly Team Engstler	133
2	5	(Spain) Campos Racing	39

- Note: Only the top five positions are included for both sets of drivers' standings.
