= 2015 TCR International Series Valencia round =

(Spain) 2015 TCR International Series Valencia round
Round details
- Round 3 of 11 rounds in the 2015 TCR International Series
- Layout of the Circuit Ricardo Tormo
- Location: Circuit Ricardo Tormo, Cheste, Spain
- Course: Permanent racing facility 4.005 km (2.517 mi)

TCR International Series

Race 1
- Date: 3 May 2015
- Laps: 15

Pole position
Driver	(Spain) Pepe Oriola	Team Craft-Bamboo Lukoil
- Time: 1:42.045

Podium
First	(Spain) Pepe Oriola	Team Craft-Bamboo Lukoil
Second	(Russia) Sergey Afanasyev	Team Craft-Bamboo Lukoil
Third	(Spain) Jordi Gené	Team Craft-Bamboo Lukoil

Fastest lap
Driver	(Spain) Pepe Oriola	Team Craft-Bamboo Lukoil
- Time: 1:42.778 (on lap 3)

Race 2
- Date: 3 May 2015
- Laps: 17

Podium
First	(Switzerland) Stefano Comini	Target Competition
Second	(Denmark) Michel Nykjær	Target Competition
Third	(Italy) Gianni Morbidelli	WestCoast Racing

Fastest lap
Driver	(Spain) Pepe Oriola	Team Craft-Bamboo Lukoil
- Time: 1:43.251 (on lap 6)

The 2015 TCR International Series Valencia round was the third round of the 2015 TCR International Series season. It took place on 3 May at the Circuit Ricardo Tormo.

Pepe Oriola won the first race, starting from pole position, and Stefano Comini gained the second one, both driving a SEAT León Cup Racer.

== Success Ballast ==
Due to the results obtained in the previous round, Gianni Morbidelli received +30 kg, Andrea Belicchi +20 kg and Stefano Comini +10 kg.

== Classification ==
=== Qualifying ===
Pos.	No.	Driver	Car	Team	Q1	Q2	Grid	Points
1	74	(Spain) Pepe Oriola	SEAT León Cup Racer	(United Kingdom) Team Craft-Bamboo Lukoil	1:42.502	1:42.045	1	5
2	33	(Italy) Andrea Belicchi	SEAT León Cup Racer	(Italy) Target Competition	1:42.600	1:42.143	2	4
3	25	(Switzerland) Stefano Comini	SEAT León Cup Racer	(Italy) Target Competition	1:42.451	1:42.183	3	3
4	17	(Denmark) Michel Nykjær	SEAT León Cup Racer	(Italy) Target Competition	1:42.966	1:42.300	4	2
5	77	(Russia) Sergey Afanasyev	SEAT León Cup Racer	(United Kingdom) Team Craft-Bamboo Lukoil	1:42.438	1:42.537	5	1
6	88	(Spain) Jordi Gené	SEAT León Cup Racer	(United Kingdom) Team Craft-Bamboo Lukoil	1:42.460	1:42.823	6	
7	6	(Germany) Franz Engstler	Audi TT Cup	(Germany) Liqui Moly Team Engstler	1:42.609	1:42.837	7	
8	19	(Spain) Oscar Nogués	Opel Astra OPC	(Spain) Campos Racing	1:43.110	1:42.866	8	
9	34	(Netherlands) Bas Schouten	SEAT León Cup Racer	(Netherlands) Bas Koeten Racing	1:43.028	1:42.915	9	
10	10	(Italy) Gianni Morbidelli	Honda Civic Type R TCR (FK2)	(Sweden) WestCoast Racing	1:42.710	1:42.971	10	
11	32	(Spain) David Cebrián	SEAT León Cup Racer	(France) JSB Compétition	1:43.014	1:42.995	11	
12	24	(United States) Kevin Gleason	Honda Civic Type R TCR (FK2)	(Sweden) WestCoast Racing	1:42.448	4:52.946	12	
13	8	(Russia) Mikhail Grachev	Audi TT Cup	(Germany) Liqui Moly Team Engstler	1:43.135		13	
14	11	(France) Lucile Cypriano	SEAT León Cup Racer	(France) JSB Compétition	1:43.139		14	
15	20	(Ukraine) Igor Skuz	Honda Civic Type R TCR (FK2)	(Sweden) WestCoast Racing	1:43.498		15	
16	7	(Italy) Lorenzo Veglia	SEAT León Cup Racer	(Germany) Liqui Moly Team Engstler	1:43.718		16	
17	21	(Spain) Jordi Oriola	Opel Astra OPC	(Spain) Campos Racing	1:44.239		17	

=== Race 1 ===
Pos.	No.	Driver	Car	Team	Laps	Time/Retired	Grid	Points
1	74	(Spain) Pepe Oriola	SEAT León Cup Racer	(United Kingdom) Team Craft-Bamboo Lukoil	15	26:06.049	1	25
2	77	(Russia) Sergey Afanasyev	SEAT León Cup Racer	(United Kingdom) Team Craft-Bamboo Lukoil	15	+4.593	5	18
3	88	(Spain) Jordi Gené	SEAT León Cup Racer	(United Kingdom) Team Craft-Bamboo Lukoil	15	+5.285	6	15
4	33	(Italy) Andrea Belicchi	SEAT León Cup Racer	(Italy) Target Competition	15	+6.005	2	12
5	8	(Russia) Mikhail Grachev	Audi TT Cup	(Germany) Liqui Moly Team Engstler	15	+10.046	13	10
6	25	(Switzerland) Stefano Comini	SEAT León Cup Racer	(Italy) Target Competition	15	+11.570	3	8
7	17	(Denmark) Michel Nykjær	SEAT León Cup Racer	(Italy) Target Competition	15	+12.081	4	6
8	10	(Italy) Gianni Morbidelli	Honda Civic Type R TCR (FK2)	(Sweden) WestCoast Racing	15	+17.729	10	4
9	34	(Netherlands) Bas Schouten	SEAT León Cup Racer	(Netherlands) Bas Koeten Racing	15	+19.348	9	2
10	7	(Italy) Lorenzo Veglia	SEAT León Cup Racer	(Germany) Liqui Moly Team Engstler	15	+25.251	16	1
11	24	(United States) Kevin Gleason	Honda Civic Type R TCR (FK2)	(Sweden) WestCoast Racing	15	+26.184	12	
12	11	(France) Lucile Cypriano	SEAT León Cup Racer	(France) JSB Compétition	15	+27.162	14	
13	19	(Spain) Oscar Nogués	Opel Astra OPC	(Spain) Campos Racing	15	+40.019	8	
14	32	(Spain) David Cebrián	SEAT León Cup Racer	(France) JSB Compétition	14	Technical	11	
15	20	(Ukraine) Igor Skuz	Honda Civic Type R TCR (FK2)	(Sweden) WestCoast Racing	14	+1 lap	15	
Ret	6	(Germany) Franz Engstler	Audi TT Cup	(Germany) Liqui Moly Team Engstler	7	Collision	7	
NC	21	(Spain) Jordi Oriola	Opel Astra OPC	(Spain) Campos Racing	5	+10 laps	17	

=== Race 2 ===
Pos.	No.	Driver	Car	Team	Laps	Time/Retired	Grid	Points
1	25	(Switzerland) Stefano Comini	SEAT León Cup Racer	(Italy) Target Competition	17	33:54.125	8	25
2	17	(Denmark) Michel Nykjær	SEAT León Cup Racer	(Italy) Target Competition	17	+7.775	7	18
3	10	(Italy) Gianni Morbidelli	Honda Civic Type R TCR (FK2)	(Sweden) WestCoast Racing	17	+17.732	1	15
4	24	(United States) Kevin Gleason	Honda Civic Type R TCR (FK2)	(Sweden) WestCoast Racing	17	+29.735	11	12
5	74	(Spain) Pepe Oriola	SEAT León Cup Racer	(United Kingdom) Team Craft-Bamboo Lukoil	17	+31.723	10	10
6	32	(Spain) David Cebrián	SEAT León Cup Racer	(France) JSB Compétition	17	+32.501	16^{1}	8
7	7	(Italy) Lorenzo Veglia	SEAT León Cup Racer	(Germany) Liqui Moly Team Engstler	17	+35.679	15	6
8	34	(Netherlands) Bas Schouten	SEAT León Cup Racer	(Netherlands) Bas Koeten Racing	16	Fuel pump	2	4
9	77	(Russia) Sergey Afanasyev	SEAT León Cup Racer	(United Kingdom) Team Craft-Bamboo Lukoil	16	+1 lap	6	2
Ret	6	(Germany) Franz Engstler	Audi TT Cup	(Germany) Liqui Moly Team Engstler	11	Technical	4	
Ret	11	(France) Lucile Cypriano	SEAT León Cup Racer	(France) JSB Compétition	10	Technical	13	
Ret	21	(Spain) Jordi Oriola	Opel Astra OPC	(Spain) Campos Racing	5	Technical	17^{1}	
Ret	20	(Ukraine) Igor Skuz	Honda Civic Type R TCR (FK2)	(Sweden) WestCoast Racing	5	Technical	14	
Ret	19	(Spain) Oscar Nogués	Opel Astra OPC	(Spain) Campos Racing	1	Collision	3	
Ret	88	(Spain) Jordi Gené	SEAT León Cup Racer	(United Kingdom) Team Craft-Bamboo Lukoil	0	Collision	5	
Ret	8	(Russia) Mikhail Grachev	Audi TT Cup	(Germany) Liqui Moly Team Engstler	0	Collision	12	
DSQ^{2}	33	(Italy) Andrea Belicchi	SEAT León Cup Racer	(Italy) Target Competition	17	+9.205	9	

Notes:

- ^1 — David Cebrián and Jordi Oriola were moved to the back of the grid because of a parc fermé infringement.
- ^2 — Andrea Belicchi was disqualified for not have served a drive through penalty.

== Standings after the event ==
Drivers' Championship standings

	Pos	Driver	Points
1	1	(Switzerland) Stefano Comini	106
1	2	(Italy) Gianni Morbidelli	91
1	3	(Spain) Pepe Oriola	89
1	4	(Italy) Andrea Belicchi	75
	5	(United States) Kevin Gleason	57

Teams' Championship standings

	Pos	Driver	Points
	1	(Italy) Target Competition	209
1	2	(United Kingdom) Team Craft-Bamboo Lukoil	168
1	3	(Sweden) WestCoast Racing	163
	4	(Germany) Liqui Moly Team Engstler	66
	5	(Hungary) Zengő Motorsport	19

- Note: Only the top five positions are included for both sets of drivers' standings.
