= 2015 TCR International Series Shanghai round =

(China) 2015 TCR International Series Shanghai round
Round details
- Round 2 of 11 rounds in the 2015 TCR International Series
- Layout of the Shanghai International Circuit
- Location: Shanghai International Circuit, Shanghai, China
- Course: Permanent racing facility 5.451 km (3.388 mi)

TCR International Series

Race 1
- Date: 11 April 2015
- Laps: 10

Pole position
Driver	(Italy) Gianni Morbidelli	WestCoast Racing
- Time: 2:15.798

Podium
First	(Italy) Gianni Morbidelli	WestCoast Racing
Second	(Germany) René Münnich	WestCoast Racing
Third	(United States) Kevin Gleason	WestCoast Racing

Fastest lap
Driver	(Italy) Gianni Morbidelli	WestCoast Racing
- Time: 2:17.363 (on lap 3)

Race 2
- Date: 12 April 2015
- Laps: 10

Podium
First	(Italy) Andrea Belicchi	Target Competition
Second	(Switzerland) Stefano Comini	Target Competition
Third	(Italy) Gianni Morbidelli	WestCoast Racing

Fastest lap
Driver	(Italy) Gianni Morbidelli	WestCoast Racing
- Time: 2:17.553 (on lap 3)

The 2015 TCR International Series Shanghai round was the second round of the 2015 TCR International Series season. It took place on 11–12 April at the Shanghai International Circuit.

Gianni Morbidelli won the first race, starting from pole position, driving a Honda Civic Type R TCR (FK2), and Andrea Belicchi gained the second one, driving a SEAT León Cup Racer.

== Success Ballast ==
Due to the results obtained in the previous round, Stefano Comini received +30 kg, Pepe Oriola +20 kg and Jordi Gené +10 kg.

== Classification ==
=== Qualifying ===
Pos.	No.	Driver	Car	Team	Q1	Q2	Grid	Points
1	10	(Italy) Gianni Morbidelli	Honda Civic Type R TCR (FK2)	(Sweden) WestCoast Racing	2:16.474	2:15.798	1	5
2	23	(Germany) René Münnich	Honda Civic Type R TCR (FK2)	(Sweden) WestCoast Racing	2:17.065	2:16.267	2	4
3	24	(United States) Kevin Gleason	Honda Civic Type R TCR (FK2)	(Sweden) WestCoast Racing	2:17.364	2:16.542	3	3
4	8	(Russia) Mikhail Grachev	Audi TT Cup	(Germany) Liqui Moly Team Engstler	2:17.688	2:17.179	4	2
5	74	(Spain) Pepe Oriola	SEAT León Cup Racer	(United Kingdom) Team Craft-Bamboo Lukoil	2:18.229	2:17.206	5	1
6	47	(Hungary) Norbert Tóth	SEAT León Cup Racer	(Hungary) Zengő Motorsport	2:18.531	2:17.349	6	
7	6	(Germany) Franz Engstler	Audi TT Cup	(Germany) Liqui Moly Team Engstler	2:17.725	2:17.421	7	
8	25	(Switzerland) Stefano Comini	SEAT León Cup Racer	(Italy) Target Competition	2:18.536	2:17.737	8	
9	17	(Denmark) Michel Nykjær	SEAT León Cup Racer	(Italy) Target Competition	2:18.802	2:17.738	9	
10	33	(Italy) Andrea Belicchi	SEAT León Cup Racer	(Italy) Target Competition	2:18.194	2:17.774	10	
11	5	(China) Jiang Tengyi	SEAT León Cup Racer	(Italy) Target Competition	2:18.821	2:18.407	11	
12	7	(Italy) Lorenzo Veglia	SEAT León Cup Racer	(Germany) Liqui Moly Team Engstler	2:18.813	2:19.296	12	
13	77	(Russia) Sergey Afanasyev	SEAT León Cup Racer	(United Kingdom) Team Craft-Bamboo Lukoil	2:19.000		13	
14	88	(Spain) Jordi Gené	SEAT León Cup Racer	(United Kingdom) Team Craft-Bamboo Lukoil	2:19.342		14	
15	20	(Ukraine) Igor Skuz	SEAT León Cup Racer	(Spain) Campos Racing	2:20.439		15	
16	21	(Spain) Jordi Oriola	Opel Astra OPC	(Spain) Campos Racing	withdrew		16	

=== Race 1 ===
Pos.	No.	Driver	Car	Team	Laps	Time/Retired	Grid	Points
1	10	(Italy) Gianni Morbidelli	Honda Civic Type R TCR (FK2)	(Sweden) WestCoast Racing	10	23:18.758	1	25
2	23	(Germany) René Münnich	Honda Civic Type R TCR (FK2)	(Sweden) WestCoast Racing	10	+0.851	2	18
3	24	(United States) Kevin Gleason	Honda Civic Type R TCR (FK2)	(Sweden) WestCoast Racing	10	+3.767	3	15
4	25	(Switzerland) Stefano Comini	SEAT León Cup Racer	(Italy) Target Competition	10	+5.510	8	12
5	33	(Italy) Andrea Belicchi	SEAT León Cup Racer	(Italy) Target Competition	10	+7.542	10	10
6	6	(Germany) Franz Engstler	Audi TT Cup	(Germany) Liqui Moly Team Engstler	10	+9.714	7	8
7	88	(Spain) Jordi Gené	SEAT León Cup Racer	(United Kingdom) Team Craft-Bamboo Lukoil	10	+10.822	14	6
8	47	(Hungary) Norbert Tóth	SEAT León Cup Racer	(Hungary) Zengõ Motorsport	10	+11.493	6	4
9	17	(Denmark) Michel Nykjær	SEAT León Cup Racer	(Italy) Target Competition	10	+12.342	9	2
10	77	(Russia) Sergey Afanasyev	SEAT León Cup Racer	(United Kingdom) Team Craft-Bamboo Lukoil	10	+15.066	13	1
11	7	(Italy) Lorenzo Veglia	SEAT León Cup Racer	(Germany) Liqui Moly Team Engstler	10	+15.712	12	
12	5	(China) Jiang Tengyi	SEAT León Cup Racer	(Italy) Target Competition	10	+19.139	11	
13	20	(Ukraine) Igor Skuz	SEAT León Cup Racer	(Spain) Campos Racing	10	+32.989	15	
14	8	(Russia) Mikhail Grachev	Audi TT Cup	(Germany) Liqui Moly Team Engstler	10	+38.051^{1}	4	
Ret	74	(Spain) Pepe Oriola	SEAT León Cup Racer	(United Kingdom) Team Craft-Bamboo Lukoil	1	Puncture	5	
WD	21	(Spain) Jordi Oriola	Opel Astra OPC	(Spain) Campos Racing		Withdrew		

Notes:

- ^1 — Mikhail Grachev was given a 30-second penalty for causing a collision with Jordi Gené.

=== Race 2 ===
Pos.	No.	Driver	Car	Team	Laps	Time/Retired	Grid	Points
1	33	(Italy) Andrea Belicchi	SEAT León Cup Racer	(Italy) Target Competition	10	23:19.292	1	25
2	25	(Switzerland) Stefano Comini	SEAT León Cup Racer	(Italy) Target Competition	10	+1.252	3	18
3	10	(Italy) Gianni Morbidelli	Honda Civic Type R TCR (FK2)	(Sweden) WestCoast Racing	10	+1.500	10	15
4	74	(Spain) Pepe Oriola	SEAT León Cup Racer	(United Kingdom) Team Craft-Bamboo Lukoil	10	+3.821	6	12
5	17	(Denmark) Michel Nykjær	SEAT León Cup Racer	(Italy) Target Competition	10	+4.351	2	10
6	24	(United States) Kevin Gleason	Honda Civic Type R TCR (FK2)	(Sweden) WestCoast Racing	10	+6.419	8	8
7	6	(Germany) Franz Engstler	Audi TT Cup	(Germany) Liqui Moly Team Engstler	10	+6.544	4	6
8	7	(Italy) Lorenzo Veglia	SEAT León Cup Racer	(Germany) Liqui Moly Team Engstler	10	+9.684	12	4
9	5	(China) Jiang Tengyi	SEAT León Cup Racer	(Italy) Target Competition	10	+10.695	11	2
10	88	(Spain) Jordi Gené	SEAT León Cup Racer	(United Kingdom) Team Craft-Bamboo Lukoil	10	+13.595	14	1
11	77	(Russia) Sergey Afanasyev	SEAT León Cup Racer	(United Kingdom) Team Craft-Bamboo Lukoil	10	+13.837	13	
12	47	(Hungary) Norbert Tóth	SEAT León Cup Racer	(Hungary) Zengő Motorsport	10	+14.727	5	
13	20	(Ukraine) Igor Skuz	SEAT León Cup Racer	(Spain) Campos Racing	10	+26.165	15	
14	23	(Germany) René Münnich	Honda Civic Type R TCR (FK2)	(Sweden) WestCoast Racing	10	+45.576^{2}	4	
Ret	8	(Russia) Mikhail Grachev	Audi TT Cup	(Germany) Liqui Moly Team Engstler	2	Collision	7	
WD	21	(Spain) Jordi Oriola	Opel Astra OPC	(Spain) Campos Racing		Withdrew		

Notes:

- ^2 — René Münnich was given a 30-second penalty for causing a collision with Sergey Afanasyev.

== Standings after the event ==
Drivers' Championship standings

	Pos	Driver	Points
3	1	(Italy) Gianni Morbidelli	72
1	2	(Switzerland) Stefano Comini	70
2	3	(Italy) Andrea Belicchi	59
1	4	(Spain) Pepe Oriola	49
1	5	(United States) Kevin Gleason	45

Teams' Championship standings

	Pos	Driver	Points
1	1	(Italy) Target Competition	134
1	2	(Sweden) WestCoast Racing	126
2	3	(United Kingdom) Team Craft-Bamboo Lukoil	106
	4	(Germany) Liqui Moly Team Engstler	43
	5	(Hungary) Zengő Motorsport	19

- Note: Only the top five positions are included for both sets of drivers' standings.
