= 2015 TCR International Series Salzburgring round =

(Austria) 2015 TCR International Series Salzburgring round
Round details
- Round 6 of 11 rounds in the 2015 TCR International Series
- Layout of the Salzburgring
- Location: Salzburgring, Salzburg, Austria
- Course: Permanent racing facility 4.230 km (2.630 mi)

TCR International Series

Race 1
- Date: 31 May 2015
- Laps: 15

Pole position
Driver	(United States) Kevin Gleason	WestCoast Racing
- Time: 1:26.915

Podium
First	(United States) Kevin Gleason	WestCoast Racing
Second	(Switzerland) Stefano Comini	Target Competition
Third	(Italy) Andrea Belicchi	Target Competition

Fastest lap
Driver	(United States) Kevin Gleason	WestCoast Racing
- Time: 1:27.818 (on lap 6)

Race 2
- Date: 31 May 2015
- Laps: 15

Podium
First	(Denmark) Michel Nykjær	Target Competition
Second	(Spain) Pepe Oriola	Team Craft-Bamboo Lukoil
Third	(Italy) Gianni Morbidelli	WestCoast Racing

Fastest lap
Driver	(United States) Kevin Gleason	WestCoast Racing
- Time: 1:27.454 (on lap 4)

The 2015 TCR International Series Salzburgring round was the sixth round of the 2015 TCR International Series season. It took place on 31 May at the Salzburgring.

Kevin Gleason won the first race, starting from pole position, driving a Honda Civic Type R TCR (FK2), and Michel Nykjær gained the second one, driving a SEAT León Cup Racer.

== Success Ballast ==
Due to the results obtained in the previous round, Gianni Morbidelli received +30 kg, Jordi Gené +20 kg and Andrea Belicchi +10 kg.

== Classification ==
=== Qualifying ===
Pos.	No.	Driver	Car	Team	Q1	Q2	Grid	Points
1	24	(United States) Kevin Gleason	Honda Civic Type R TCR (FK2)	(Sweden) WestCoast Racing	1:28.346	1:26.915	1	5
2	10	(Italy) Gianni Morbidelli	Honda Civic Type R TCR (FK2)	(Sweden) WestCoast Racing	1:28.170	1:27.006	2	4
3	25	(Switzerland) Stefano Comini	SEAT León Cup Racer	(Italy) Target Competition	1:27.400	1:27.107	3	3
4	74	(Spain) Pepe Oriola	SEAT León Cup Racer	(United Kingdom) Team Craft-Bamboo Lukoil	1:28.059	1:27.168	4	2
5	88	(Spain) Jordi Gené	SEAT León Cup Racer	(United Kingdom) Team Craft-Bamboo Lukoil	1:27.675	1:27.269	5	1
6	77	(Russia) Sergey Afanasyev	SEAT León Cup Racer	(United Kingdom) Team Craft-Bamboo Lukoil	1:28.146	1:27.310	6	
7	33	(Italy) Andrea Belicchi	SEAT León Cup Racer	(Italy) Target Competition	1:27.281	1:27.314	7	
8	8	(Russia) Mikhail Grachev	SEAT León Cup Racer	(Germany) Liqui Moly Team Engstler	1:27.674	1:27.386	8	
9	17	(Denmark) Michel Nykjær	SEAT León Cup Racer	(Italy) Target Competition	1:27.889	1:27.403	9	
10	20	(Ukraine) Igor Skuz	Honda Civic Type R TCR (FK2)	(Sweden) WestCoast Racing	1:28.540	1:27.628	10	
11	7	(Italy) Lorenzo Veglia	SEAT León Cup Racer	(Germany) Liqui Moly Team Engstler	1:27.859	1:27.704	11	
12	34	(Netherlands) Bas Schouten	SEAT León Cup Racer	(Netherlands) Bas Koeten Racing	1:27.885	1:27.981	12	
13	16	(Germany) Markus Östreich	Opel Astra OPC	(Spain) Campos Racing	1:30.633		13	
14	46	(Hungary) Zsolt Szabó	SEAT León Cup Racer	(Hungary) Zengő Motorsport	1:45.849		14^{1}	
15	22	(Spain) Fernando Monje	Opel Astra OPC	(Spain) Campos Racing	no time		15^{1}	

Notes:

- ^1 — Zsolt Szabó and Fernando Monje were moved to the back of the grid for having not set a time within the 107% limit.

=== Race 1 ===
Pos.	No.	Driver	Car	Team	Laps	Time/Retired	Grid	Points
1	24	(United States) Kevin Gleason	Honda Civic Type R TCR (FK2)	(Sweden) WestCoast Racing	15	22:14.024	1	25
2	25	(Switzerland) Stefano Comini	SEAT León Cup Racer	(Italy) Target Competition	15	+2.838	3	18
3	33	(Italy) Andrea Belicchi	SEAT León Cup Racer	(Italy) Target Competition	15	+5.109	6	15
4	88	(Spain) Jordi Gené	SEAT León Cup Racer	(United Kingdom) Team Craft-Bamboo Lukoil	15	+5.595	5	12
5	10	(Italy) Gianni Morbidelli	Honda Civic Type R TCR (FK2)	(Sweden) WestCoast Racing	15	+5.919	2	10
6	74	(Spain) Pepe Oriola	SEAT León Cup Racer	(United Kingdom) Team Craft-Bamboo Lukoil	15	+7.399	4	8
7	7	(Italy) Lorenzo Veglia	SEAT León Cup Racer	(Germany) Liqui Moly Team Engstler	15	+7.857	10	6
8	77	(Russia) Sergey Afanasyev	SEAT León Cup Racer	(United Kingdom) Team Craft-Bamboo Lukoil	15	+8.214	11^{2}	4
9	34	(Netherlands) Bas Schouten	SEAT León Cup Racer	(Netherlands) Bas Koeten Racing	15	+15.293	12	2
10	16	(Germany) Markus Östreich	Opel Astra OPC	(Spain) Campos Racing	15	+17.935	13	1
11	46	(Hungary) Zsolt Szabó	SEAT León Cup Racer	(Hungary) Zengő Motorsport	12	Puncture	14	
12	17	(Denmark) Michel Nykjær	SEAT León Cup Racer	(Italy) Target Competition	11	Technical	8	
Ret	20	(Ukraine) Igor Skuz	Honda Civic Type R TCR (FK2)	(Sweden) WestCoast Racing	8	Collision	9	
Ret	8	(Russia) Mikhail Grachev	SEAT León Cup Racer	(Germany) Liqui Moly Team Engstler	5	Technical	7	
DNS	22	(Spain) Fernando Monje	Opel Astra OPC	(Spain) Campos Racing		Technical	15	

Notes:

- ^2 — Sergey Afanasyev was given a five-place grid penalty for causing a collision with Mikhail Grachev and Michel Nykjær in the Monza round.

=== Race 2 ===
Pos.	No.	Driver	Car	Team	Laps	Time/Retired	Grid	Points
1	17	(Denmark) Michel Nykjær	SEAT León Cup Racer	(Italy) Target Competition	15	22:17.434	2	25
2	74	(Spain) Pepe Oriola	SEAT León Cup Racer	(United Kingdom) Team Craft-Bamboo Lukoil	15	+0.436	7	18
3	10	(Italy) Gianni Morbidelli	Honda Civic Type R TCR (FK2)	(Sweden) WestCoast Racing	15	+1.429	9	15
4	77	(Russia) Sergey Afanasyev	SEAT León Cup Racer	(United Kingdom) Team Craft-Bamboo Lukoil	15	+1.838	5	12
5	33	(Italy) Andrea Belicchi	SEAT León Cup Racer	(Italy) Target Competition	15	+2.598	4	10
6	24	(United States) Kevin Gleason	Honda Civic Type R TCR (FK2)	(Sweden) WestCoast Racing	15	+3.026	10	8
7	8	(Russia) Mikhail Grachev	SEAT León Cup Racer	(Germany) Liqui Moly Team Engstler	15	+17.800	3	6
8	25	(Switzerland) Stefano Comini	SEAT León Cup Racer	(Italy) Target Competition	15	+19.459	8	4
9	34	(Netherlands) Bas Schouten	SEAT León Cup Racer	(Netherlands) Bas Koeten Racing	15	+25.106	12	2
10	88	(Spain) Jordi Gené	SEAT León Cup Racer	(United Kingdom) Team Craft-Bamboo Lukoil	15	+1:22.753	6	1
11	7	(Italy) Lorenzo Veglia	SEAT León Cup Racer	(Germany) Liqui Moly Team Engstler	13	Technical	11	
Ret	16	(Germany) Markus Östreich	Opel Astra OPC	(Spain) Campos Racing	8	Engine	13	
Ret	20	(Ukraine) Igor Skuz	Honda Civic Type R TCR (FK2)	(Sweden) WestCoast Racing	1	Collision	1	
DNS	46	(Hungary) Zsolt Szabó	SEAT León Cup Racer	(Hungary) Zengő Motorsport		Accident	14	
DNS	22	(Spain) Fernando Monje	Opel Astra OPC	(Spain) Campos Racing		Technical	15	

== Standings after the event ==
Drivers' Championship standings

	Pos	Driver	Points
	1	(Italy) Gianni Morbidelli	175
	2	(Switzerland) Stefano Comini	157
	3	(Spain) Pepe Oriola	153
	4	(Spain) Jordi Gené	134
1	5	(United States) Kevin Gleason	127

Teams' Championship standings

	Pos	Driver	Points
	1	(Italy) Target Competition	361
1	2	(Sweden) WestCoast Racing	332
1	3	(United Kingdom) Team Craft-Bamboo Lukoil	328
	4	(Germany) Liqui Moly Team Engstler	147
	5	(Spain) Campos Racing	41

- Note: Only the top five positions are included for both sets of drivers' standings.
