= 2015 TCR International Series Sochi round =

(Russia) 2015 TCR International Series Sochi round
Round details
- Round 7 of 11 rounds in the 2015 TCR International Series
- Layout of the Sochi Autodrom
- Location: Sochi Autodrom, Sochi, Russia
- Course: Permanent racing facility 5.848 km (3.634 mi)

TCR International Series

Race 1
- Date: 21 June 2015
- Laps: 11

Pole position
Driver	(Spain) Jordi Gené	Team Craft-Bamboo Lukoil
- Time: 2:20.976

Podium
First	(Spain) Jordi Gené	Team Craft-Bamboo Lukoil
Second	(Spain) Pepe Oriola	Team Craft-Bamboo Lukoil
Third	(Italy) Andrea Belicchi	Target Competition

Fastest lap
Driver	(Spain) Pepe Oriola	Team Craft-Bamboo Lukoil
- Time: 2:21.115 (on lap 6)

Race 2
- Date: 21 June 2015
- Laps: 11

Podium
First	(Switzerland) Stefano Comini	Target Competition
Second	(Spain) Pepe Oriola	Team Craft-Bamboo Lukoil
Third	(Russia) Mikhail Grachev	Liqui Moly Team Engstler

Fastest lap
Driver	(Switzerland) Stefano Comini	Target Competition
- Time: 2:21.520 (on lap 3)

The 2015 TCR International Series Sochi round was the seventh round of the 2015 TCR International Series season. It took place on 21 June at the Sochi Autodrom.

Jordi Gené won the first race, starting from pole position, and Stefano Comini gained the second one, both driving a SEAT León Cup Racer.

== Success Ballast ==
Due to the results obtained in the previous round, Kevin Gleason received +30 kg, Gianni Morbidelli +20 kg and Pepe Oriola +10 kg.

== Classification ==
=== Qualifying ===
Pos.	No.	Driver	Car	Team	Time	Grid	Points
1	88	(Spain) Jordi Gené	SEAT León Cup Racer	(United Kingdom) Team Craft-Bamboo Lukoil	2:20.976^{1}	1	5
2	33	(Italy) Andrea Belicchi	SEAT León Cup Racer	(Italy) Target Competition	2:21.025	2	4
3	74	(Spain) Pepe Oriola	SEAT León Cup Racer	(United Kingdom) Team Craft-Bamboo Lukoil	2:21.256	3	3
4	4	(Sweden) Tomas Engström	SEAT León Cup Racer	(Germany) Liqui Moly Team Engstler	2:21.272	4	2
5	8	(Russia) Mikhail Grachev	SEAT León Cup Racer	(Germany) Liqui Moly Team Engstler	2:21.403	5	1
6	77	(Russia) Sergey Afanasyev	SEAT León Cup Racer	(United Kingdom) Team Craft-Bamboo Lukoil	2:21.564	6	
7	25	(Switzerland) Stefano Comini	SEAT León Cup Racer	(Italy) Target Competition	2:21.582	7	
8	10	(Italy) Gianni Morbidelli	Honda Civic Type R TCR (FK2)	(Sweden) WestCoast Racing	2:21.658	8	
9	17	(Denmark) Michel Nykjær	SEAT León Cup Racer	(Italy) Target Competition	2:21.199	9	
10	24	(United States) Kevin Gleason	Honda Civic Type R TCR (FK2)	(Sweden) WestCoast Racing	2:22.136	10	
11	2	(Russia) Aleksey Dudukalo	SEAT León Cup Racer	(Russia) Lukoil Racing Team	2:22.283	11	
12	26	(Russia) Ildar Rakhmatullin	Honda Civic Type R TCR (FK2)	(Sweden) WestCoast Racing	2:24.685	12	

Notes:

- ^1 — Jordi Gené's best lap time was deleted for exceeding track limits.

=== Race 1 ===
Pos.	No.	Driver	Car	Team	Laps	Time/Retired	Grid	Points
1	88	(Spain) Jordi Gené	SEAT León Cup Racer	(United Kingdom) Team Craft-Bamboo Lukoil	11	26:04.706	1	25
2	74	(Spain) Pepe Oriola	SEAT León Cup Racer	(United Kingdom) Team Craft-Bamboo Lukoil	11	+0.598	3	18
3	33	(Italy) Andrea Belicchi	SEAT León Cup Racer	(Italy) Target Competition	11	+3.445	2	15
4	25	(Switzerland) Stefano Comini	SEAT León Cup Racer	(Italy) Target Competition	11	+8.211	7	12
5	77	(Russia) Sergey Afanasyev	SEAT León Cup Racer	(United Kingdom) Team Craft-Bamboo Lukoil	11	+10.948	6	10
6	8	(Russia) Mikhail Grachev	SEAT León Cup Racer	(Germany) Liqui Moly Team Engstler	11	+12.023	5	8
7	10	(Italy) Gianni Morbidelli	Honda Civic Type R TCR (FK2)	(Sweden) WestCoast Racing	11	+14.444	8	6
8	24	(United States) Kevin Gleason	Honda Civic Type R TCR (FK2)	(Sweden) WestCoast Racing	11	+18.420	10	4
9	17	(Denmark) Michel Nykjær	SEAT León Cup Racer	(Italy) Target Competition	11	+20.262	9	2
10	4	(Sweden) Tomas Engström	SEAT León Cup Racer	(Germany) Liqui Moly Team Engstler	11	+23.691	4	1
11	2	(Russia) Aleksey Dudukalo	SEAT León Cup Racer	(Russia) Lukoil Racing Team	11	+25.794	11	
12	26	(Russia) Ildar Rakhmatullin	Honda Civic Type R TCR (FK2)	(Sweden) WestCoast Racing	9	Oil pressure	12	

=== Race 2 ===
Pos.	No.	Driver	Car	Team	Laps	Time/Retired	Grid	Points
1	25	(Switzerland) Stefano Comini	SEAT León Cup Racer	(Italy) Target Competition	11	26:14.548	3	25
2	74	(Spain) Pepe Oriola	SEAT León Cup Racer	(United Kingdom) Team Craft-Bamboo Lukoil	11	+0.611	6	18
3	8	(Russia) Mikhail Grachev	SEAT León Cup Racer	(Germany) Liqui Moly Team Engstler	11	+3.470	5	15
4	77	(Russia) Sergey Afanasyev	SEAT León Cup Racer	(United Kingdom) Team Craft-Bamboo Lukoil	11	+7.544	4	12
5	88	(Spain) Jordi Gené	SEAT León Cup Racer	(United Kingdom) Team Craft-Bamboo Lukoil	11	+8.440	8	10
6	24	(United States) Kevin Gleason	Honda Civic Type R TCR (FK2)	(Sweden) WestCoast Racing	11	+9.406	1	8
7	17	(Denmark) Michel Nykjær	SEAT León Cup Racer	(Italy) Target Competition	11	+9.776	2	6
8	4	(Sweden) Tomas Engström	SEAT León Cup Racer	(Germany) Liqui Moly Team Engstler	11	+10.532	11^{2}	4
9	2	(Russia) Aleksey Dudukalo	SEAT León Cup Racer	(Russia) Lukoil Racing Team	11	+17.251	9	2
10	26	(Russia) Ildar Rakhmatullin	Honda Civic Type R TCR (FK2)	(Sweden) WestCoast Racing	11	+23.853	10	1
Ret	33	(Italy) Andrea Belicchi	SEAT León Cup Racer	(Italy) Target Competition	6	Collision	7	
DNS	10	(Italy) Gianni Morbidelli	Honda Civic Type R TCR (FK2)	(Sweden) WestCoast Racing		Turbo	12^{2}	

Notes:

- ^2 — Tomas Engström and Gianni Morbidelli were moved to the back of the grid because of a parc fermé infringement.

== Standings after the event ==
Drivers' Championship standings

	Pos	Driver	Points
1	1	(Switzerland) Stefano Comini	194
1	2	(Spain) Pepe Oriola	192
2	3	(Italy) Gianni Morbidelli	181
	4	(Spain) Jordi Gené	174
1	5	(Italy) Andrea Belicchi	146

Teams' Championship standings

	Pos	Driver	Points
	1	(Italy) Target Competition	425
1	2	(United Kingdom) Team Craft-Bamboo Lukoil	409
1	3	(Sweden) WestCoast Racing	360
	4	(Germany) Liqui Moly Team Engstler	185
	5	(Spain) Campos Racing	41

- Note: Only the top five positions are included for both sets of drivers' standings.
