= 2015 TCR International Series =

Touring car racing season

Seasons
- ← none 2016 →

The 2015 TCR International Series was the inaugural season of the TCR International Series, a motor racing championship for touring cars held across Asia and Europe. The season began at Sepang on 28 March and finished on 22 November at the Guia Circuit in Macau.

Stefano Comini won the drivers' championship, driving a SEAT León Cup Racer, and Target Competition won the teams' championship.

== Teams and drivers ==
Michelin is the official tire supplier.

Team	Car	No.	Drivers	Rounds
(United Kingdom) Team Craft-Bamboo Lukoil (Hong Kong) Craft-Bamboo Racing (Russia) Lukoil Racing Team	SEAT León Cup Racer	2	(Russia) Aleksey Dudukalo	7
(United Kingdom) Team Craft-Bamboo Lukoil (Hong Kong) Craft-Bamboo Racing (Russia) Lukoil Racing Team	SEAT León Cup Racer	74	(Spain) Pepe Oriola	All
(United Kingdom) Team Craft-Bamboo Lukoil (Hong Kong) Craft-Bamboo Racing (Russia) Lukoil Racing Team	SEAT León Cup Racer	77	(Russia) Sergey Afanasyev	All
(United Kingdom) Team Craft-Bamboo Lukoil (Hong Kong) Craft-Bamboo Racing (Russia) Lukoil Racing Team	SEAT León Cup Racer	80	(Thailand) Munkong Sathienthirakul	10
(United Kingdom) Team Craft-Bamboo Lukoil (Hong Kong) Craft-Bamboo Racing (Russia) Lukoil Racing Team	SEAT León Cup Racer	88	(Spain) Jordi Gené	All
(United Kingdom) Team Craft-Bamboo Lukoil (Hong Kong) Craft-Bamboo Racing (Russia) Lukoil Racing Team	SEAT León Cup Racer	99	(Hong Kong) Frank Yu	1, 9, 11
(Germany) Liqui Moly Team Engstler	Audi TT Cup	3	(Denmark) Nicki Thiim	4
(Germany) Liqui Moly Team Engstler	Audi TT Cup	6	(Germany) Franz Engstler	1–3
(Germany) Liqui Moly Team Engstler	Audi TT Cup	8	(Russia) Mikhail Grachev	1–3
(Germany) Liqui Moly Team Engstler	Audi TT Cup	9	(South Africa) Kelvin van der Linde	4
(Germany) Liqui Moly Team Engstler	SEAT León Cup Racer	4	(Sweden) Tomas Engström	7
(Germany) Liqui Moly Team Engstler	SEAT León Cup Racer	7	(Italy) Lorenzo Veglia	1–6, 8–10
(Germany) Liqui Moly Team Engstler	SEAT León Cup Racer	8	(Russia) Mikhail Grachev	4–7
(Germany) Liqui Moly Team Engstler	SEAT León Cup Racer	49	(France) Guillaume Cunnington	11
(Germany) Liqui Moly Team Engstler	Volkswagen Golf TCR	4	(Sweden) Tomas Engström	9–10
(Germany) Liqui Moly Team Engstler	Volkswagen Golf TCR	7	(Italy) Lorenzo Veglia	11
(Germany) Liqui Moly Team Engstler	Volkswagen Golf TCR	8	(Russia) Mikhail Grachev	8–11
(Germany) Liqui Moly Team Engstler	Volkswagen Golf TCR	42	(Spain) Pol Rosell	8
(Italy) Target Competition	SEAT León Cup Racer	5	(China) Jiang Tengyi	2
(Italy) Target Competition	SEAT León Cup Racer	15	(Netherlands) Loris Hezemans	9–10
(Italy) Target Competition	SEAT León Cup Racer	17	(Denmark) Michel Nykjær	1–7
(Italy) Target Competition	SEAT León Cup Racer	21	(Spain) Jordi Oriola	11
(Italy) Target Competition	SEAT León Cup Racer	25	(Switzerland) Stefano Comini	All
(Italy) Target Competition	SEAT León Cup Racer	33	(Italy) Andrea Belicchi	1–8, 11
(Italy) Target Competition	SEAT León Cup Racer	35	(France) Rafaël Galiana	9–11
(Italy) Target Competition	SEAT León Cup Racer	40	(Monaco) Gabriele Marotta	8
(Italy) Target Competition	SEAT León Cup Racer	41	(Italy) Michela Cerruti	8
(Italy) Target Competition	SEAT León Cup Racer	50	(Portugal) Francisco Mora	11
(Italy) Target Competition	SEAT León Cup Racer	98	(Hong Kong) Keith Chan	11
(Sweden) WestCoast Racing	Honda Civic Type R TCR (FK2)	10	(Italy) Gianni Morbidelli	All
(Sweden) WestCoast Racing	Honda Civic Type R TCR (FK2)	12	(United Kingdom) Robert Huff	11
(Sweden) WestCoast Racing	Honda Civic Type R TCR (FK2)	20	(Ukraine) Igor Skuz	3–6, 8
(Sweden) WestCoast Racing	Honda Civic Type R TCR (FK2)	23	(Germany) René Münnich	1–2, 9–10
(Sweden) WestCoast Racing	Honda Civic Type R TCR (FK2)	24	(United States) Kevin Gleason	All
(Sweden) WestCoast Racing	Honda Civic Type R TCR (FK2)	26	(Russia) Ildar Rakhmatullin	7
(Sweden) WestCoast Racing	Honda Civic Type R TCR (FK2)	28	(Hong Kong) Sunny Wong	11
(France) JSB Compétition	SEAT León Cup Racer	11	(France) Lucile Cypriano	3
(France) JSB Compétition	SEAT León Cup Racer	32	(Spain) David Cebrián	3
(Hong Kong) FRD HK Racing	Ford Focus ST	13	(Hong Kong) Kenneth Ma	9
(Hong Kong) FRD HK Racing	Ford Focus ST	27	(United States) Robb Holland	10
(Spain) Campos Racing	Opel Astra OPC	14	(United Kingdom) Josh Files	11
(Spain) Campos Racing	Opel Astra OPC	16	(Germany) Markus Östreich	6
(Spain) Campos Racing	Opel Astra OPC	19	(Spain) Oscar Nogués	3–4
(Spain) Campos Racing	Opel Astra OPC	20	(Ukraine) Igor Skuz	1
(Spain) Campos Racing	Opel Astra OPC	21	(Spain) Jordi Oriola	1–3
(Spain) Campos Racing	Opel Astra OPC	22	(Portugal) Armando Parente	4
(Spain) Campos Racing	Opel Astra OPC	22	(Spain) Fernando Monje	5–6, 9
(Spain) Campos Racing	Opel Astra OPC	44	(Hong Kong) Mak Hing Tak	9
(Spain) Campos Racing	Opel Astra OPC	45	(France) Hugo Valente	10
(Spain) Campos Racing	Opel Astra OPC	76	(United Kingdom) Dan Wells	11
(Spain) Campos Racing	SEAT León Cup Racer	20	(Ukraine) Igor Skuz	2
(Portugal) Veloso Motorsport	SEAT León Cup Racer	18	(Portugal) José Monroy	4
(Portugal) Veloso Motorsport	SEAT León Cup Racer	50	(Portugal) Francisco Mora	4
(Hong Kong) Roadstar Racing	SEAT León Cup Racer	27	(United States) Robb Holland	11
(Hong Kong) Roadstar Racing	SEAT León Cup Racer	56	(Hong Kong) Samson Chan	9–11
(Hong Kong) Roadstar Racing	SEAT León Cup Racer	66	(Macau) Filipe de Souza	9–10
(Hong Kong) Roadstar Racing	SEAT León Cup Racer	78	(Taiwan) George Chou	9
(Hong Kong) Roadstar Racing	SEAT León Cup Racer	97	(Taiwan) Johnson Huang	10–11
PAS Macau Racing Team	Honda Civic Type R TCR (FK2)	29	(Macau) Henry Ho	11
(Macau) Asia Racing Team	SEAT León Cup Racer	31	(Thailand) Tin Sritrai	10
(Macau) Asia Racing Team	SEAT León Cup Racer	63	(Hong Kong) Sam Lok	11
(Macau) Asia Racing Team	SEAT León Cup Racer	69	(China) Kevin Pu	10
(Macau) Asia Racing Team	SEAT León Cup Racer	87	(Macau) Rodolfo Ávila	11
(Netherlands) Bas Koeten Racing	SEAT León Cup Racer	34	(Netherlands) Bas Schouten	3, 6
(Italy) B.D. Racing	SEAT León Cup Racer	36	(Italy) Antonio D'Amico	5
(Hong Kong) Prince Racing	Honda Civic Type R TCR (FK2)	38	(Hong Kong) Kenneth Lau	9–11
(Hong Kong) Prince Racing	Honda Civic Type R TCR (FK2)	68	(Hong Kong) Michael Choi	9–11
(Hungary) Zengő Motorsport	SEAT León Cup Racer	43	(Hungary) Dániel Nagy	8
(Hungary) Zengő Motorsport	SEAT León Cup Racer	46	(Hungary) Zsolt Szabó	5–6
(Hungary) Zengő Motorsport	SEAT León Cup Racer	47	(Hungary) Norbert Tóth	2
(Hungary) Zengő Motorsport	SEAT León Cup Racer	55	(Hungary) Ferenc Ficza	1
(Hungary) Zengő Motorsport	SEAT León Cup Racer	90	(Italy) Davide Roda	5
(Italy) Top Run Motorsport	Subaru Impreza STi TCR	51	(Italy) Luca Rangoni	9
(Italy) Top Run Motorsport	Subaru Impreza STi TCR	52	(Switzerland) Alain Menu	10–11
(Malaysia) Niza Racing	SEAT León Cup Racer	65	(Malaysia) Douglas Khoo	10–11
(Italy) Proteam Racing	Ford Focus ST	71	(United Kingdom) Tom Boardman	5
(Italy) Proteam Racing	Ford Focus ST	72	(Italy) Diego Romanini	1, 8
(Italy) Proteam Racing	Ford Focus ST	73	(United Kingdom) James Nash	11

== Calendar ==
The provisional 2015 schedule was announced on 31 October 2014. On the same day that the announcement came that the series would be renamed TCR, it was confirmed that the round in Shanghai would go back a week, because the Chinese Grand Prix and Bahrain Grand Prix switched places on the Formula One calendar. On 13 March 2015, it was announced that the Chilean round, due to be held on 9 August at Autódromo Internacional de Codegua, was postponed to 2016 due to circuit reconstruction. On 17 June 2015 the Argentine round, scheduled for 26 July at Autódromo Juan y Oscar Gálvez, was replaced by the Red Bull Ring due to organisational problems.

Rnd.	Race	Circuit	Date	Supporting
1	1	(Malaysia) Sepang International Circuit, Kuala Lumpur	28 March	Malaysian Grand Prix
1	2	(Malaysia) Sepang International Circuit, Kuala Lumpur	29 March	Malaysian Grand Prix
2	3	(China) Shanghai International Circuit, Shanghai	11 April	Chinese Grand Prix
2	4	(China) Shanghai International Circuit, Shanghai	12 April	Chinese Grand Prix
3	5	(Spain) Circuit Ricardo Tormo, Cheste	3 May	Campeonato de España de Resistencia
3	6	(Spain) Circuit Ricardo Tormo, Cheste	3 May	Campeonato de España de Resistencia
4	7	(Portugal) Algarve International Circuit, Portimão	10 May	TCR Portuguese Series; Portuguese GT Championship
4	8	(Portugal) Algarve International Circuit, Portimão	10 May	TCR Portuguese Series; Portuguese GT Championship
5	9	(Italy) Autodromo Nazionale di Monza, Monza	24 May	Targa Tricolore Porsche
5	10	(Italy) Autodromo Nazionale di Monza, Monza	24 May	Targa Tricolore Porsche
6	11	(Austria) Salzburgring, Salzburg	31 May	Histo-Cup Austria Mozartpreis
6	12	(Austria) Salzburgring, Salzburg	31 May	Histo-Cup Austria Mozartpreis
7	13	(Russia) Sochi Autodrom, Sochi	21 June	TCR Russian Series; SMP F4 Championship
7	14	(Russia) Sochi Autodrom, Sochi	21 June	TCR Russian Series; SMP F4 Championship
8	15	(Austria) Red Bull Ring, Spielberg	12 July	European Le Mans Series; Formula Renault 3.5 Series
8	16	(Austria) Red Bull Ring, Spielberg	12 July	European Le Mans Series; Formula Renault 3.5 Series
9	17	Marina Bay Street Circuit, Singapore	19 September	Singapore Grand Prix; TCR Asia Series
9	18	Marina Bay Street Circuit, Singapore	20 September	Singapore Grand Prix; TCR Asia Series
10	19	(Thailand) Chang International Circuit, Buriram	25 October	TCR Asia Series; GT Asia Series
10	20	(Thailand) Chang International Circuit, Buriram	25 October	TCR Asia Series; GT Asia Series
11	21	Guia Circuit, Macau	22 November	Macau Grand Prix; FIA GT World Cup; TCR Asia Series
11	22	Guia Circuit, Macau	22 November	Macau Grand Prix; FIA GT World Cup; TCR Asia Series

== Results ==
Rnd.	Race	Circuit	Pole position	Fastest lap	Winning driver	Winning team	Report
1	1	(Malaysia) Sepang International Circuit	(United States) Kevin Gleason	(Switzerland) Stefano Comini	(Switzerland) Stefano Comini	(Italy) Target Competition	Report
1	2	(Malaysia) Sepang International Circuit		(Italy) Andrea Belicchi	(Spain) Jordi Gené	(United Kingdom) Team Craft-Bamboo Lukoil	Report
2	3	(China) Shanghai International Circuit	(Italy) Gianni Morbidelli	(Italy) Gianni Morbidelli	(Italy) Gianni Morbidelli	(Sweden) WestCoast Racing	Report
2	4	(China) Shanghai International Circuit		(Italy) Gianni Morbidelli	(Italy) Andrea Belicchi	(Italy) Target Competition	Report
3	5	(Spain) Circuit Ricardo Tormo	(Spain) Pepe Oriola	(Spain) Pepe Oriola	(Spain) Pepe Oriola	(United Kingdom) Team Craft-Bamboo Lukoil	Report
3	6	(Spain) Circuit Ricardo Tormo		(Spain) Pepe Oriola	(Switzerland) Stefano Comini	(Italy) Target Competition	Report
4	7	(Portugal) Algarve International Circuit	(Denmark) Nicki Thiim	(Denmark) Nicki Thiim	(Denmark) Nicki Thiim	(Germany) Liqui Moly Team Engstler	Report
4	8	(Portugal) Algarve International Circuit		(Denmark) Nicki Thiim	(Denmark) Michel Nykjær	(Italy) Target Competition	Report
5	9	(Italy) Autodromo Nazionale di Monza	(Italy) Gianni Morbidelli	(United States) Kevin Gleason	(Italy) Gianni Morbidelli	(Sweden) WestCoast Racing	Report
5	10	(Italy) Autodromo Nazionale di Monza		(United States) Kevin Gleason	(Italy) Gianni Morbidelli	(Sweden) WestCoast Racing	Report
6	11	(Austria) Salzburgring	(United States) Kevin Gleason	(United States) Kevin Gleason	(United States) Kevin Gleason	(Sweden) WestCoast Racing	Report
6	12	(Austria) Salzburgring		(United States) Kevin Gleason	(Denmark) Michel Nykjær	(Italy) Target Competition	Report
7	13	(Russia) Sochi Autodrom	(Spain) Jordi Gené	(Spain) Pepe Oriola	(Spain) Jordi Gené	(United Kingdom) Team Craft-Bamboo Lukoil	Report
7	14	(Russia) Sochi Autodrom		(Switzerland) Stefano Comini	(Switzerland) Stefano Comini	(Italy) Target Competition	Report
8	15	(Austria) Red Bull Ring	(Italy) Gianni Morbidelli	(Italy) Gianni Morbidelli	(Switzerland) Stefano Comini	(Italy) Target Competition	Report
8	16	(Austria) Red Bull Ring		(Russia) Sergey Afanasyev	(Spain) Pol Rosell	(Germany) Liqui Moly Team Engstler	Report
9	17	(Singapore) Marina Bay Street Circuit	(Switzerland) Stefano Comini	(Italy) Gianni Morbidelli	(United States) Kevin Gleason	(Sweden) WestCoast Racing	Report
9	18	(Singapore) Marina Bay Street Circuit		(Spain) Jordi Gené	(Spain) Jordi Gené	(United Kingdom) Team Craft-Bamboo Lukoil	Report
10	19	(Thailand) Chang International Circuit	(Italy) Gianni Morbidelli	(Italy) Gianni Morbidelli	(Spain) Pepe Oriola	(United Kingdom) Team Craft-Bamboo Lukoil	Report
10	20	(Thailand) Chang International Circuit		(United States) Kevin Gleason	(Switzerland) Stefano Comini	(Italy) Target Competition	Report
11	21	(Macau) Guia Circuit	(United Kingdom) Robert Huff	(United Kingdom) Robert Huff	(United Kingdom) Robert Huff	(Sweden) WestCoast Racing	Report
11	22	(Macau) Guia Circuit		(Spain) Pepe Oriola	(Switzerland) Stefano Comini	(Italy) Target Competition	Report

== Man of the Race ==
At the end of every weekend, the Race Direction elects a driver who stood out during the event for a particular reason.

Race	Driver	Reason
(Malaysia) Sepang	(Italy) Gianni Morbidelli	For performing the best overtaking manoeuvre in race 2, against Andrea Belicchi
(China) Shanghai	(Italy) Lorenzo Veglia	For delivering an exciting but fair fight in race 2
(Spain) Valencia	(Spain) Pepe Oriola	For his superior pace in race 1 and the close fights in race 2
(Portugal) Portimão	(Russia) Mikhail Grachev	For never giving up in a very difficult weekend
(Italy) Monza	(Spain) Fernando Monje	For bringing the Opel Astra OPC consistently to the front of the action
(Austria) Salzburgring	(Italy) Andrea Belicchi	For being involved in the middle of the action in both races
(Russia) Sochi	(Russia) Aleksey Dudukalo	For playing the Stakhanovist during the whole event
(Austria) Red Bull Ring	(Spain) Pol Rosell	He came, he saw, he won for Volkswagen
Singapore	(Italy) Luca Rangoni	For the determination shown to take part in both races
(Thailand) Buriram	(Switzerland) Stefano Comini	For maintaining the championship lead despite injury and technical issues
Macau	(Spain) Jordi Oriola	For proving that overtaking at Macau is possible

== Championship standings ==
=== Drivers' championship ===
Pos.	Driver	SEP (Malaysia)		SHA (China)		VAL (Spain)		POR (Portugal)		MNZ (Italy)		SAL (Austria)		SOC (Russia)		RBR (Austria)		SIN (Singapore)		BUR (Thailand)		MAC (Macau)		Pts.
1	(Switzerland) Stefano Comini	1^{3}	4	4	2	6^{3}	1	5	11	Ret^{2}	4	2^{3}	8	4	1	1^{4}	9	**2**^{1}	2	5	1	3^{3}	1	342
2	(Spain) Pepe Oriola	2	2	Ret^{5}	4	**1**^{1}	5	Ret^{3}	4	2^{3}	Ret	6^{4}	2	2^{3}	2	3	2	4^{5}	3	1^{2}	3	4^{5}	9†	312
3	(Spain) Jordi Gené	7	1	7	10	3	Ret	2^{2}	3	4	2	4^{5}	10	**1**^{1}	5	4	3	6	1	2^{5}	4	2^{4}	Ret	285
4	(Italy) Gianni Morbidelli	4	3	**1**^{1}	3	8	3	Ret	Ret	**1**^{1}	1	5^{2}	3	7	DNS	**11**^{1}	Ret	3^{2}	4	**10**^{1}	Ret	6	4	243
5	(United States) Kevin Gleason	**6**^{1}	7	3^{3}	6	11	4	7	2	6	Ret	**1**^{1}	6	8	6	5^{2}	5	1^{3}	5	4^{3}	18†	7^{2}	Ret	226
6	(Italy) Andrea Belicchi	5^{2}	5	5	1	4^{2}	DSQ	12	10	3^{5}	5	3	5	3^{2}	Ret	2	11†					8	2	186
7	(Russia) Sergey Afanasyev	3	Ret	10	11	2^{5}	9	11	Ret	11^{4}	DNS	8	4	5	4	6^{5}	4	5^{4}	18†	3^{4}	7	10	Ret	134
8	(Russia) Mikhail Grachev	Ret	8	14^{4}	Ret	5	Ret	6	6	12†	9	Ret	7	6^{5}	3	7	6	7	7	Ret	DNS	11	3	105
9	(Denmark) Michel Nykjær	8	Ret	9	5	7^{4}	2	Ret	1	13†	DNS	12	1	9	7									100
10	(Italy) Lorenzo Veglia	10	11	11	8	10	7	3^{4}	Ret	7	8	7	11†			8	7	8	6	7	5	9	Ret	85
11	(Germany) René Münnich	Ret^{5}	6	2^{2}	14													11	10	9	Ret			34
12	(Netherlands) Loris Hezemans																	9	8	6	2			32
13	(Denmark) Nicki Thiim							**1**^{1}	13†															30
14	(United Kingdom) Robert Huff																					**1**^{1}	Ret	30
15	(Spain) Pol Rosell															9	1							27
16	(Spain) Fernando Monje									5	3	DNS	DNS					10	19†					26
17	(Sweden) Tomas Engström													10^{4}	8			12	9	8	6			21
18	(Germany) Franz Engstler	Ret^{4}	Ret	6	7	Ret	Ret																	16
19	(Spain) Jordi Oriola	DNS	DNS	WD	WD	NC	Ret															5	8†	14
20	(Portugal) José Monroy							8	5															14
21	(South Africa) Kelvin van der Linde							4^{5}	12†															13
22	(Macau) Rodolfo Ávila																					12	5	10
23	(Ukraine) Igor Skuz	DNS	Ret	13	13	15	Ret	13	9	Ret	6	Ret	Ret			12	Ret							10
24	(Hungary) Zsolt Szabó									8	7	11†	DNS											10
25	(Netherlands) Bas Schouten					9	8†					9	9											10
26	(United States) Robb Holland																			Ret	DSQ	14	6	8
27	(Spain) David Cebrián					14†	6																	8
28	(Spain) Oscar Nogués					13	Ret	9	7															8
29	(Hong Kong) Keith Chan																					18	7	6
30	(Portugal) Francisco Mora							10	8													Ret	DNS	5
31	(Italy) Michela Cerruti															10	8							5
32	(Thailand) Tin Sritrai																			12	8			4
32	(Hungary) Norbert Tóth			8	12																			4
34	(Italy) Antonio D'Amico									9	10													3
34	(Hungary) Ferenc Ficza	9	10†																					3
36	(Hungary) Dániel Nagy															Ret^{3}	DNS							3
37	(Hong Kong) Frank Yu	11	9															16	14			Ret	DNS	2
38	(Thailand) Munkong Sathienthirakul																			11	9			2
38	(Russia) Aleksey Dudukalo													11	9									2
40	(China) Jiang Tengyi			12	9																			2
41	(France) Rafaël Galiana																	13	11	22†	10	WD	WD	1
42	(United Kingdom) Tom Boardman									10	11													1
43	(Russia) Ildar Rakhmatullin													12†	10									1
44	(Monaco) Gabriele Marotta															13	10							1
45	(Germany) Markus Östreich											10	Ret											1
	(China) Kevin Pu																			13	11			0
	(Hong Kong) Michael Choi																	14	12	18	13	16	Ret	0
	(Macau) Filipe de Souza																	Ret	15	14	12			0
	(France) Lucile Cypriano					12	Ret																	0
	(Taiwan) George Chou																	18	13					0
	(United Kingdom) Josh Files																					13	Ret	0
	(Hong Kong) Kenneth Lau																	NC	16	15	14	Ret	DNS	0
	(Taiwan) Johnson Huang																			16	15	DNQ	DNQ	0
	(Hong Kong) Sunny Wong																					15	Ret	0
	(Italy) Luca Rangoni																	15	Ret					0
	(Hong Kong) Samson Chan																	17	17	17	16	19	Ret	0
	(Malaysia) Douglas Khoo																			19	17	DNQ	DNQ	0
	(France) Guillaume Cunnington																					17	Ret	0
	(Switzerland) Alain Menu																			20†	DNS	WD	WD	0
	(France) Hugo Valente																			21	Ret			0
	(Macau) Henry Ho																					NC	Ret	0
	(Italy) Diego Romanini	DNS	DNS													Ret	Ret							0
	(United Kingdom) James Nash																					Ret	DNS	0
	(Hong Kong) Kenneth Ma																	DNS	Ret					0
	(Hong Kong) Mak Hing Tak																	DNS	DNS					0
	(Italy) Davide Roda									DNS	DNS													0
	(Hong Kong) Sam Lok																					DNQ	DNQ	0
	(United Kingdom) Dan Wells																					WD	WD	0
	(Portugal) Armando Parente							WD	WD															0
Pos.	Driver	SEP (Malaysia)		SHA (China)		VAL (Spain)		POR (Portugal)		MNZ (Italy)		SAL (Austria)		SOC (Russia)		RBR (Austria)		SIN (Singapore)		BUR (Thailand)		MAC (Macau)		Pts.

Colour	Result
Gold	Winner
Silver	Second place
Bronze	Third place
Green	Points classification
Blue	Non-points classification
Blue	Non-classified finish (NC)
Purple	Retired, not classified (Ret)
Red	Did not qualify (DNQ)
Red	Did not pre-qualify (DNPQ)
Black	Disqualified (DSQ)
White	Did not start (DNS)
White	Withdrew (WD)
White	Race cancelled (C)
Blank	Did not practice (DNP)
Blank	Did not arrive (DNA)
Blank	Excluded (EX)

**Bold** – Pole
Italics – Fastest Lap

† – Drivers did not finish the race, but were classified as they completed over 75% of the race distance.

=== Teams' Championship ===
Pos.	Team	SEP (Malaysia)		SHA (China)		VAL (Spain)		POR (Portugal)		MNZ (Italy)		SAL (Austria)		SOC (Russia)		RBR (Austria)		SIN (Singapore)		BUR (Thailand)		MAC (Macau)		Pts.
1	(Italy) Target Competition	1^{2}	4	4	1	4^{2}	1	5	1	3^{2}	4	2^{3}	1	3^{2}	1	1^{4}	8	2^{1}	2	5	1	3^{3}	1	669
1	(Italy) Target Competition	5^{3}	5	5	2	6^{3}	2	12	10	13†^{5}	5	3	5	4	7	2	9	9	8	6	2	5	2	669
2	(United Kingdom) Team Craft-Bamboo Lukoil	2	1	7^{4}	4	1^{1}	5	2^{2}	3	2^{3}	2	4^{4}	2	1^{1}	2	3^{5}	2	4^{4}	1	1^{2}	3	2^{4}	9†	650
2	(United Kingdom) Team Craft-Bamboo Lukoil	3	2	10	10	2^{4}	9	11^{3}	4	4^{4}	Ret	6^{5}	4	2^{3}	4	4	3	5^{5}	3	2^{4}	4	4^{5}	Ret	650
3	(Sweden) WestCoast Racing	4^{1}	3	1^{1}	3	8	3	7^{5}	2	1^{1}	1	1^{1}	3	7	6	5^{1}	5	1^{2}	4	4^{1}	18†	1^{1}	4	545
3	(Sweden) WestCoast Racing	6^{5}	6	2^{2}	6	11	4	13	9	6	6	5^{2}	6	8	10	11^{2}	Ret	3^{3}	5	9^{3}	Ret	6	Ret	545
4	(Germany) Liqui Moly Team Engstler	10^{4}	8	6^{3}	7	5^{5}	7	1^{1}	6	7	8	7	7	6^{4}	3	7	1	7	6	7^{5}	5	9	3	320
4	(Germany) Liqui Moly Team Engstler	Ret	11	11	8	10	Ret	3^{4}	12†	12†	9	Ret	11†	10^{5}	8	8	6	8	7	8	6	11	Ret	320
5	(Spain) Campos Racing	DNS	Ret	13	13	13	Ret	9	7	5	3	10	Ret					10	19†	21†	Ret	13	Ret	44
5	(Spain) Campos Racing	DNS	DNS	WD	WD	NC	Ret	WD	WD			DNS	DNS					DNS	DNS			WD	WD	44
6	(Hungary) Zengő Motorsport	9	10†	8^{5}	12					8	7	11†	DNS			Ret^{3}	DNS							33
6	(Hungary) Zengő Motorsport									DNS	DNS													33
7	(Portugal) Veloso Motorsport							8	5															26
7	(Portugal) Veloso Motorsport							10	8															26
8	(Macau) Asia Racing Team																			12	8	12	5	13
8	(Macau) Asia Racing Team																			13	11	DNQ	DNQ	13
9	(Netherlands) Bas Koeten Racing					9	8†					9	9											18
10	(Hong Kong) Roadstar Racing																	17	13	14	12	14	6	11
10	(Hong Kong) Roadstar Racing																	18	15	16	15	19	Ret	11
11	(France) JSB Compétition					12	6																	9
11	(France) JSB Compétition					14†	Ret																	9
12	(Hong Kong) Prince Racing																	14	12	15	13	16	Ret	4
12	(Hong Kong) Prince Racing																	NC	16	18	14	Ret	DNS	4
13	(Italy) B.D. Racing									9	10													3
14	(Italy) Proteam Racing	DNS	DNS							10	11					Ret	Ret					Ret	DNS	1
	(Italy) Top Run Motorsport																	15	Ret	20†	DNS	WD	WD	0
	(Malaysia) Niza Racing																			19	17	DNQ	DNQ	0
	PAS Macau Racing Team																					NC	Ret	0
	(Hong Kong) FRD HK Racing																	DNS	Ret	Ret	DSQ			0
Pos.	Team	SEP (Malaysia)		SHA (China)		VAL (Spain)		POR (Portugal)		MNZ (Italy)		SAL (Austria)		SOC (Russia)		RBR (Austria)		SIN (Singapore)		BUR (Thailand)		MAC (Macau)		Pts.

Colour	Result
Gold	Winner
Silver	Second place
Bronze	Third place
Green	Points classification
Blue	Non-points classification
Blue	Non-classified finish (NC)
Purple	Retired, not classified (Ret)
Red	Did not qualify (DNQ)
Red	Did not pre-qualify (DNPQ)
Black	Disqualified (DSQ)
White	Did not start (DNS)
White	Withdrew (WD)
White	Race cancelled (C)
Blank	Did not practice (DNP)
Blank	Did not arrive (DNA)
Blank	Excluded (EX)

**Bold** – Pole
Italics – Fastest Lap

† – Drivers did not finish the race, but were classified as they completed over 75% of the race distance.

=== OMP Trophy ===
All drivers displaying an OMP are eligible for the OMP Trophy. Points are awarded for championships and the use of OMP safety equipment. At the end of the season, the top four drivers win a cash prize.

Pos	Driver	Manufacturer	Points
1	(Switzerland) Stefano Comini	SEAT	474
2	(Spain) Pepe Oriola	SEAT	389
3	(United States) Kevin Gleason	Honda	380
4	(Spain) Jordi Gené	SEAT	362
5	(Italy) Gianni Morbidelli	Honda	309
6	(Italy) Andrea Belicchi	SEAT	276
7	(Russia) Sergey Afanasyev	SEAT	211
8	(Denmark) Michel Nykjær	SEAT	177
9	(Ukraine) Igor Skuz	Opel; SEAT; Honda	108
10	(Germany) René Münnich	Honda	43
11	(Hungary) Zsolt Szabó	SEAT	30
12	(Netherlands) Bas Schouten	SEAT	24
13	(Spain) Jordi Oriola	Opel; SEAT	20
14	(Italy) Diego Romanini	Ford	16
15	(Spain) Oscar Nogués	Opel	12
