= B.D. Racing =

(Italy) B.D. Racing
- Team principal(s): Davide Bernasconi
- Current series: TCR International Series
- Noted drivers: TCR; 36. (Italy) Antonio D'Amico
- Website: http://www.bdracing.eu

B.D. Racing Motorsport is an Italian auto racing team based in Crosio della Valle, Italy. The team currently races in the TCR International Series. Having previously raced in the Italian SEAT León Cup amongst others.

== TCR International Series ==
=== SEAT León Cup Racer (2015–) ===
The team will enter the 2015 TCR International Series season with Antonio D'Amico driving an SEAT León Cup Racer.
