= Norbert Tóth (racing driver) =

Hungarian racing driver (born 1998)

- Nationality: Hungarian
- Born: 11 July 1998 (age 28) Miskolc, Hungary

European Touring Car Cup career
- Debut season: 2015
- Current team: Zengő Motorsport
- Car number: 99
- Starts: 2

Previous series
- 2015 2014 2009-11: TCR International Series; SEAT León Eurocup; Karting

Norbert Tóth (born 11 July 1998) is a Hungarian racing driver currently competing in the European Touring Car Cup. He previously competed in the TCR International Series and SEAT León Eurocup.

== Racing career ==
Tóth began his career in 2009 in karting. He switched to the SEAT León Eurocup in 2014, he ended 11th in the championship standings that year. In 2015, Tóth made his European Touring Car Cup debut with Zengő Motorsport, racing in the Single-makes Trophy. In April 2015, it was announced that Tóth would make his TCR International Series debut with Zengő Motorsport driving a SEAT León Cup Racer.

== Racing record ==
=== Career summary ===
Season	Series	Team	Races	Wins	Poles	F/Laps	Podiums	Points	Position
2014	SEAT León Eurocup	Gaspar Racing	8	0	0	0	0	15	11th
2015	European Touring Car Cup - Single-Make Trophy	Zengő Motorsport	2	0	0	0	0	5	10th
2015	TCR International Series	Zengő Motorsport	2	0	0	0	0	4	32nd

=== Complete TCR International Series results ===
(key) (Races in bold indicate pole position) (Races in italics indicate fastest lap)

Year	Team	Car	1	2	3	4	5	6	7	8	9	10	11	12	13	14	15	16	17	18	19	20	21	22	DC	Points
2015	Zengő Motorsport	SEAT León Cup Racer	MYS; 1	MYS; 2	CHN; 1; 8	CHN; 2; 12	ESP; 1	ESP; 2	POR; 1	POR; 2	ITA; 1	ITA; 2	AUT; 1	AUT; 2	RUS; 1	RUS; 2	RBR; 1	RBR; 2	SIN; 1	SIN; 2	THA; 1	THA; 2	MAC; 1	MAC; 2	33rd	4
