= Antonio D'Amico (racing driver) =

Italian racing driver

- Nationality: Italian
- Born: 11 February 1992 (age 34) Rome, Italy

Italian SEAT León Cup career
- Debut season: 2015
- Current team: B.D. Racing
- Car number: 8

Previous series
- 2015 2014: TCR International Series; Italian SEAT Ibiza Cupra Cup

Antonio D'Amico (born 11 February 1992) is an Italian racing driver currently competing in the Italian SEAT León Cup. He previously competed in the TCR International Series and Italian SEAT Ibiza Cupra Cup.

== Racing career ==
D'Amico began his career in 2014 in the Italian SEAT Ibiza Cupra Cup, he finished 9th in the championship standings that year. He switched to the Italian SEAT León Cup in 2015. In May 2015, it was announced that D'Amico would make his TCR International Series debut with B.D. Racing driving a SEAT León Cup Racer.

== Racing record ==
=== Complete TCR International Series results ===
(key) (Races in bold indicate pole position) (Races in italics indicate fastest lap)

Year	Team	Car	1	2	3	4	5	6	7	8	9	10	11	12	13	14	15	16	17	18	19	20	21	22	DC	Points
2015	B.D. Racing	SEAT León Cup Racer	MYS; 1	MYS; 2	CHN; 1	CHN; 2	ESP; 1	ESP; 2	POR; 1	POR; 2	ITA; 1; 9	**ITA**; **2**; 10	AUT; 1	AUT; 2	RUS; 1	RUS; 2	RBR; 1	RBR; 2	SIN; 1	SIN; 2	THA; 1	THA; 2	MAC; 1	MAC; 2	34th	3
