= Zsolt Szabó (racing driver) =

Hungarian racing driver (born 1995)

Zsolt Szabo
- Nationality: Hungarian
- Born: 16 November 1995 (age 30) Miskolc, Hungary

SEAT Leon Eurocup career
- Debut season: 2015
- Current team: Zengő Motorsport; Formula Racing Miskolc
- Car number: 66
- Starts: 13

Previous series
- 2015 2015: TCR International Series; SEAT León Eurocup

Zsolt Dávid Szabó (born 16 November 1995) is a Hungarian racing driver who last competed in the European Touring Car Cup. He previously competed in the TCR International Series and SEAT León Eurocup. He is a former simulator champion and temporary driver of Formula Racing Miskolc formula student team.

== Racing career ==
Szabó began his racing career in 2015 in SEAT León Eurocup. In May 2015, it was announced that Szabó would make his TCR International Series debut with Zengő Motorsport driving a SEAT León Cup Racer.

Szabó last competed in the European Touring Car Cup with Zengő Motorsport.

== Racing record ==
=== Career summary ===
| Season | Series | Team | Races | Wins | Poles | F/Laps | Podiums | Points | Position |
|---|---|---|---|---|---|---|---|---|---|
| 2015 | SEAT León Eurocup | Zengő Motorsport | 8 | 0 | 0 | 0 | 0 | 0 | 24th |
| 2015 | TCR International Series | Zengő Motorsport | 3 | 0 | 0 | 0 | 0 | 10 | 24th |
| 2017 | World Touring Car Championship | Zengő Motorsport | 12 | 0 | 0 | 0 | 0 | 1 | 20th |
| 2017 | European Touring Car Cup | Zengő Motorsport | 8 | 1 | 1 | 2 | 2 | 23 | 9th |
| 2018 | World Touring Car Cup | Zengő Motorsport | 26 | 0 | 0 | 0 | 0 | 4 | 31st |
| 2019 | TCR Europe Touring Car Series | M1RA | 4 | 0 | 0 | 0 | 0 | 16 | 30th |

=== Complete TCR International Series results ===
(key) (Races in bold indicate pole position) (Races in italics indicate fastest lap)

| Year | Team | Car | 1 | 2 | 3 | 4 | 5 | 6 | 7 | 8 | 9 | 10 | 11 | 12 | 13 | 14 | 15 | 16 | 17 | 18 | 19 | 20 | 21 | 22 | DC | Points |
|---|---|---|---|---|---|---|---|---|---|---|---|---|---|---|---|---|---|---|---|---|---|---|---|---|---|---|
| 2015 | Zengő Motorsport | SEAT León Cup Racer | SEP; 1 | SEP; 2 | SHA; 1 | SHA; 2 | VAL; 1 | VAL; 2 | ALG; 1 | ALG; 2 | MNZ; 1; 8 | MNZ; 2; 7 | SAL; 1; 11† | SAL; 2 DNS | SOC; 1 | SOC; 2 | RBR; 1 | RBR; 2 | MRN; 1 | MRN; 2 | CHA; 1 | CHA; 2 | MAC; 1 | MAC; 2 | 24th | 10 |

^{†} Driver did not finish the race, but was classified as he completed over 90% of the race distance.

=== Complete World Touring Car Championship results ===
(key) (Races in bold indicate pole position) (Races in italics indicate fastest lap)

| Year | Team | Car | 1 | 2 | 3 | 4 | 5 | 6 | 7 | 8 | 9 | 10 | 11 | 12 | 13 | 14 | 15 | 16 | 17 | 18 | 19 | 20 | DC | Points |
|---|---|---|---|---|---|---|---|---|---|---|---|---|---|---|---|---|---|---|---|---|---|---|---|---|
| 2017 | Zengő Motorsport | Honda Civic WTCC | MAR; 1 | MAR; 2 | ITA; 1 | ITA; 2 | HUN; 1 | HUN; 2 | GER; 1 | GER; 2 | POR; 1 | POR; 2 | ARG; 1; 13 | ARG; 2; 15 | CHN; 1 DSQ | CHN; 2 DSQ | JPN; 1; 17 | JPN; 2; 16 | MAC; 1; 16 | MAC; 2; 10 | QAT; 1; 16 | QAT; 2; 15 | 20th | 1 |

=== Complete World Touring Car Cup results ===
(key) (Races in bold indicate pole position) (Races in italics indicate fastest lap)

| Year | Team | Car | 1 | 2 | 3 | 4 | 5 | 6 | 7 | 8 | 9 | 10 | 11 | 12 | 13 | 14 | 15 | 16 | 17 | 18 | 19 | 20 | 21 | 22 | 23 | 24 | 25 | 26 | 27 | 28 | 29 | 30 | DC | Points |
|---|---|---|---|---|---|---|---|---|---|---|---|---|---|---|---|---|---|---|---|---|---|---|---|---|---|---|---|---|---|---|---|---|---|---|
| 2018 | Zengő Motorsport | Cupra León TCR | MAR; 1; 17 | MAR; 2 Ret | MAR; 3 Ret | HUN; 1; 21 | HUN; 2; 9 | HUN; 3 Ret | GER; 1 DNS | GER; 2 Ret | GER; 3 DNS | NED; 1; 16 | NED; 2; 17 | NED; 3 Ret | POR; 1 Ret | POR; 2 Ret | POR; 3 Ret | SVK; 1 Ret | SVK; 2; 19 | SVK; 3; 9 | CHN; 1 Ret | CHN; 2 Ret | CHN; 3; 21 | WUH; 1; 20 | WUH; 2; 17 | WUH; 3 Ret | JPN; 1; 21 | JPN; 2 Ret | JPN; 3 DNS | MAC; 1 DNQ | MAC; 2; 22 | MAC; 3; 24† | 31st | 4 |

^{†} Driver did not finish the race, but was classified as he completed over 90% of the race distance.

=== Complete TCR Europe Touring Car Series results ===
(key) (Races in bold indicate pole position) (Races in italics indicate fastest lap)

| Year | Team | Car | 1 | 2 | 3 | 4 | 5 | 6 | 7 | 8 | 9 | 10 | 11 | 12 | 13 | 14 | DC | Points |
|---|---|---|---|---|---|---|---|---|---|---|---|---|---|---|---|---|---|---|
| 2019 | M1RA | Hyundai i30 N TCR | HUN; 1 | HUN; 2 | HOC; 1 | HOC; 2 | SPA; 1 | SPA; 2 | RBR; 1 | RBR; 2 | OSC; 1; 8 | OSC; 2; 16 | CAT; 1; 15 | CAT; 2; 26 | MNZ; 1 | MNZ; 2 | 30th | 16 |
