= Igor Skuz =

Ukrainian racing driver (born 1976)

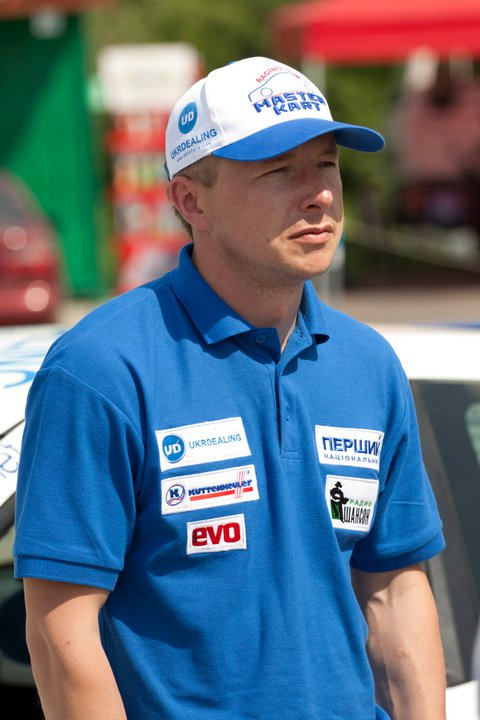
- Nationality: (Ukraine) Ukrainian
- Born: Igor Vasylyovych Skuz; 30 May 1976 (age 50) Kyiv, Ukrainian SSR, Soviet Union

UTC career
- Debut season: 2007
- Current team: MasterKart Racing Team
- Championships: 5 (2010, 2011, 2012, 2017, 2018)
- Best finish: 1st in 2019

Previous series
- 2017—2020 2015 2011–2014 2011 2007—2013 2007 1984—2006: UTC; TCR International Series; ETCC; RTCC; UCRC; Dubai 24 Hour; Karting

Championship titles
- 2017—2018 2010—2012 2000 1994: UTC; UTC; Karting; Karting

TCR International Series career
- Debut season: 2015
- Current team: WestCoast Racing
- Car number: 20
- Former teams: Campos Racing
- Starts: 13

Igor Vasyliovych Skuz (Ukrainian: Ігор Васильович Скуз, born 30 May 1976) is a Ukrainian professional racing driver currently competing in the Ukrainian Touring Championship since 2007 for a family-owned MasterKart Racing Team, that also has a role of main promoter of the series since 2018. Outside Ukraine he competed in Russian Touring Car Championship, European Touring Car Cup and TCR International Series.

== Racing career ==
=== Karting ===
Skuz started his career in 1984 in karting and was competing there for more than twenty years. He was competing in Soviet and foreign championships with a good results. In 1990, he was nominated as a Master of Sport Candidate, he got his first championship title in 1994. In 2000, he won the Intercontinental class championship and got a title of the Master of Sport of Ukraine. He was racing alongside his older brother Oleg in their own team, called MasterKart. Skuz won more than 200 karting races.

=== Ukrainian Circuit Racing Championship ===
In 2007, Skuz planned switching to Ukrainian Circuit Racing Championship, where his older brother was already racing, but before that he entered the 2007 Dubai 24 Hour, driving an A1-class Ford Fiesta for Team Rhino's Leipert. His first ever touring car driving experience had resulted in second place in his class. In the Ukrainian championship he debuted in a U1600 class driving a Fiesta as well, now for the MasterKart team.

For the first two years, the team was struggling in the series, that was completely new for them, despite the good qualifying times of Skuz, in the races he was experiencing technical failures. In 2008, he drove in both S2000 and Touring Lite classes and achieved his first win. His first chance of winning the championship was in 2009, when he was fighting with Russian racer Aleksey Basov, who was already a champion in his country. He got one win, but in the next round he was involved in a big crash, so his car needed a body change. He failed his last chances, when his car got a technical failure in the next round, and when later the main venue for the championship, Autodrome Chaika, cancelled the final round of the season. He finished third n the final standings.

In the next years, Skuz finally started getting a stable performances, winning in his class in 2010. In 2011, he got his second championship title. That year, he also appeared at the Russian Touring Car Championship rainy race at Moscow as a guest driver, driving his MasterKart Ford. He failed to get a good result, crashing in the first race and getting a penalty for ignoring yellow flag in the second one.

In 2012, Skuz became a Champion of Ukraine for the third time. In 2013 Skuz finished the season fourth and left the championship to focus on international racing.

=== ETCC and TCR International ===
In 2011, alongside the Ukrainian championship, Skuz started competing in the European Touring Car Cup, driving a Ford Fiesta 1.6 16V for ATM Racing in the Super 1600 division, resulting fifth in the championship.

Skuz switched to the Super 2000 division for 2012, driving for Liqui Moly Team Engstler in a BMW 320si. However, he switched to a SEAT León 2.0 TDI run by SUNRED Engineering for the remaining rounds of season. He got the fourth place in the European Cup.

In the ETCC, Skuz switched to Campos Racing driving a naturally-aspirated SEAT León, in the new team he was seventh in the championship.

For 2014, Skuz stayed with Campos Racing, but switched to a Chevrolet Cruze 1.6T, he ended the season third in the TC2T standings, having his first two victories. In March 2015, it was announced that Skuz would make his TCR International Series debut with Campos Racing driving an Opel Astra OPC, however after the first round of the championship he switched to a SEAT León Cup Racer. After a bad start of the year, he switched to WestCoast Racing driving a Honda Civic TCR. He got only two finishes in points and left the series before the season ended.

=== Return as a racer and promoter of Ukrainian Touring Championship ===
In 2017, Skuz returned to Ukrainian Circuit Racing Championship and immediately got his fourth title. For 2018, his team MasterKart became a promoter of the series, renaming it to Ukrainian Touring Championship and organizing a live streaming of the races at NTN for one season. That year, Skuz got his fifth and last Champion of Ukraine title, next year his car faced technical issues resulting in DNFs.

The 2020 season got severely delayed because of the COVID-19 pandemic, first two races were run without spectators except for drivers' families. With disease outbreak situation getting worse the series had to get a break before two last rounds getting relocated to an unfinished intersection in Odesa with help of the politician and ex-racing driver Yevhen Chervonenko. Skuz's car kept being unreliable and in the final race of the season it stopped right before the finish line so Skuz had to push it by himself.

After the 2020 season, Skuz retired from motorsport to start an automotive tuning company, and UTC attempted to find a new promoter but failed with the 2021 season getting cancelled.

== Racing record ==
=== Complete European Touring Car Cup results ===
(key) (Races in bold indicate pole position) (Races in italics indicate fastest lap)

| Year | Team | Car | 1 | 2 | 3 | 4 | 5 | 6 | 7 | 8 | 9 | 10 | DC | Points |
|---|---|---|---|---|---|---|---|---|---|---|---|---|---|---|
| 2011 | ATM Racing | Ford Fiesta 1.6 16V | SAL; 1 Ret | SAL; 2; 11 | | | | | | | | | 5th | 7 |
| 2012 | Liqui Moly Team Engstler | BMW 320si | MNZ; 1; 16 | MNZ; 2; 7 | SVK; 1 | SVK; 2 | | | | | | | 4th | 35 |
| 2012 | SUNRED Engineering | SEAT León 2.0 TDI | | | | | **SAL**; **1**; 9 | SAL; 2; 8 | IMO; 1; 2 | IMO; 2; 2 | | | 4th | 35 |
| 2013 | Campos Racing | SEAT León | MNZ; 1; 19 | MNZ; 2 Ret | SVK; 1; 9 | SVK; 2 Ret | SAL; 1; 14 | SAL; 2; 14 | PER; 1; 6 | **PER**; **2**; 6 | BRN; 1; 24 | BRN; 2; 21† | 7th | 25 |
| 2014 | Campos Racing | Chevrolet Cruze 1.6T | LEC; 1; 3 | **LEC**; **2**; 1 | SVK; 1; 15 | SVK; 2; 5 | **SAL**; **1** Ret | SAL; 2; 7 | SPA; 1; 3 | **SPA**; **2** Ret | PER; 1; 4 | PER; 2; 1 | 3rd | 79 |

^{†} Driver did not finish the race, but was classified as he completed over 90% of the race distance.

=== Complete TCR International Series results ===
(key) (Races in bold indicate pole position) (Races in italics indicate fastest lap)

| Year | Team | Car | 1 | 2 | 3 | 4 | 5 | 6 | 7 | 8 | 9 | 10 | 11 | 12 | 13 | 14 | 15 | 16 | 17 | 18 | 19 | 20 | 21 | 22 | DC | Points |
|---|---|---|---|---|---|---|---|---|---|---|---|---|---|---|---|---|---|---|---|---|---|---|---|---|---|---|
| 2015 | Campos Racing | Opel Astra OPC | MYS; 1 DNS | MYS; 2 Ret | | | | | | | | | | | | | | | | | | | | | 23rd | 10 |
| 2015 | Campos Racing | SEAT León Cup Racer | | | CHN; 1; 13 | CHN; 2; 13 | | | | | | | | | | | | | | | | | | | 23rd | 10 |
| 2015 | WestCoast Racing | Honda Civic TCR | | | | | ESP; 1; 15 | ESP; 2 Ret | POR; 1; 13 | POR; 2; 9 | ITA; 1 Ret | ITA; 2; 6 | AUT; 1 Ret | **AUT**; **2** Ret | RUS; 1 | RUS; 2 | RBR; 1; 12 | RBR; 2 Ret | SIN; 1 | SIN; 2 | THA; 1 | THA; 2 | MAC; 1 | MAC; 2 | 23rd | 10 |
