= Mikhail Grachev =

Russian racing driver (born 1988)

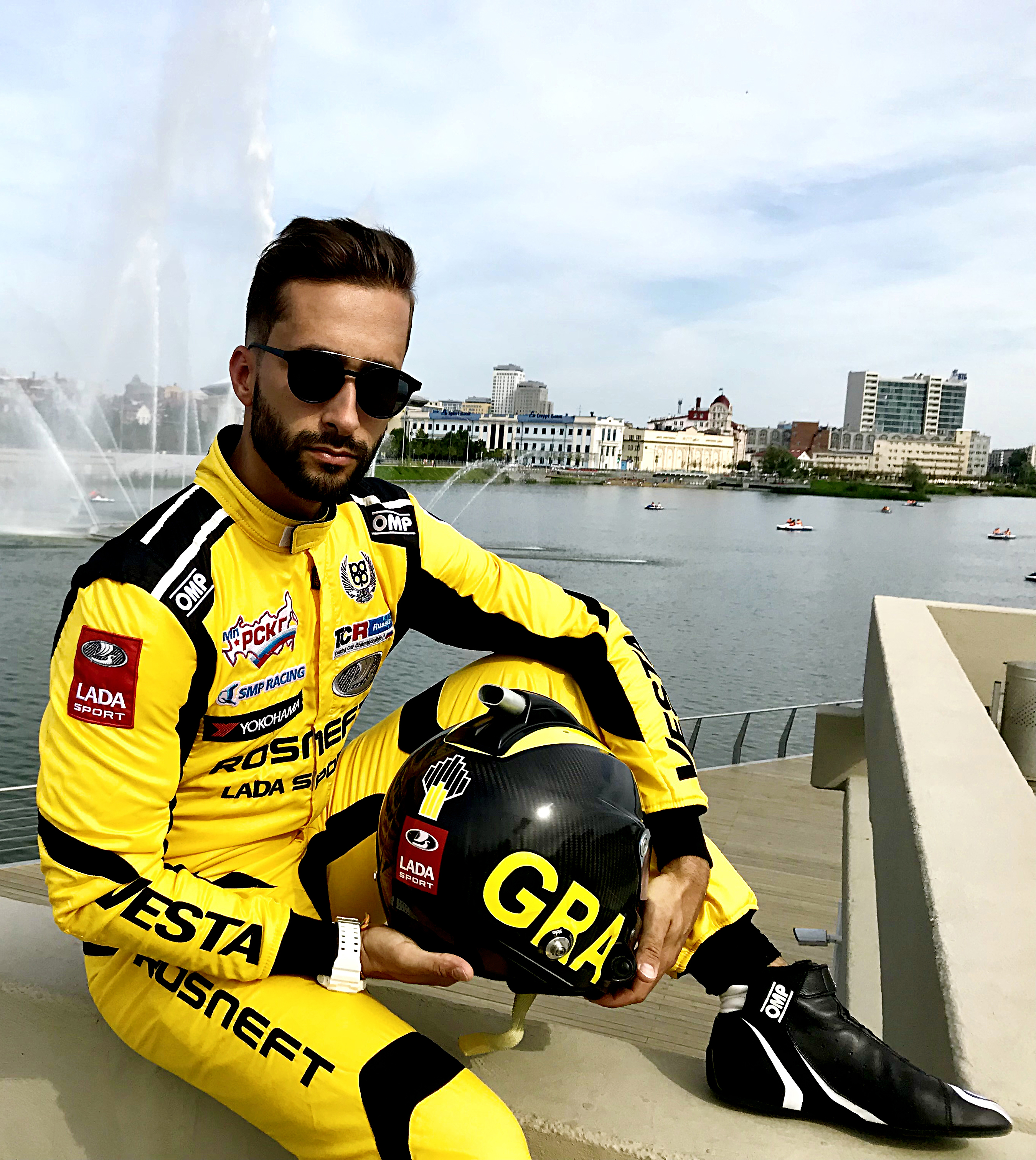
- Nationality: Russian
- Born: 4 January 1988 (age 38) Omsk, Russia SFSR, Soviet Union

TCR International Series career
- Debut season: 2015
- Current team: WestCoast Racing
- Categorisation: FIA Silver
- Car number: 8
- Former teams: Engstler Motorsport
- Starts: 43
- Wins: 4
- Poles: 0
- Fastest laps: 1
- Best finish: 8th in 2015, 2016

Previous series
- 2014 2014 2013–2014 2011–2014 2008: ADAC Procar Series; Lamborghini Super Trofeo; European Touring Car Cup; Russian Touring Car Championship; Karting

Championship titles
- 2013–2014 2012: Russian Touring Car Championship; Russian Touring Car Championship – Light

Mikhail Grachev (Russian: Михаил Грачёв; born 4 January 1988) is a Russian racing driver currently competing in the TCR International Series. He made his debut in 2015, having previously raced in the European Touring Car Cup.

== Racing career ==
Grachev began his career Karting in 2008. In 2011, Grachev made his Russian Touring Car Championship debut in the Touring-Light class, winning the Touring-Light championship in 2012. He raced in the overall championship from 2013 to 2014, winning the championship both years. In 2013, Grachev also raced in the European Touring Car Cup, he raced in the championship from 2013 to 2014. In 2014, he raced in a couple of races in the Lamborghini Super Trofeo and the ADAC Procar Series. In February 2015, it was announced that Grachev would make his TCR International Series debut with Liqui Moly Team Engstler.

== Racing record ==
=== Complete European Touring Car Cup results ===
(key) (Races in bold indicate pole position) (Races in italics indicate fastest lap)

Year	Team	Car	1	2	3	4	5	6	7	8	9	10	DC	Points
2013	AMG Motorsport	BMW 320si	MNZ; 1; 12	MNZ; 2; 12	SVK; 1	SVK; 2	SAL; 1	SAL; 2	PER; 1	PER; 2			10th	14
2013	Proteam Racing	BMW 320si									BRN; 1; 15	BRN; 2; 12	10th	14
2014	Proteam Racing	BMW 320 TC	LEC; 1 Ret	LEC; 2; 15	SVK; 1; 5	**SVK**; **2**; **3**	SAL; 1	SAL; 2	SPA; 1	SPA; 2	PER; 1	PER; 2	5th	23

=== Complete TCR International Series results ===
(key) (Races in bold indicate pole position) (Races in italics indicate fastest lap)

Year	Team	Car	1	2	3	4	5	6	7	8	9	10	11	12	13	14	15	16	17	18	19	20	21	22	DC	Points
2015	Liqui Moly Team Engstler	Audi TT Cup	MYS; 1 Ret	MYS; 2; 8	CHN; 1; 14	CHN; 2 Ret	ESP; 1; 5	ESP; 2 Ret																	8th	105
2015	Liqui Moly Team Engstler	SEAT León Cup Racer							POR; 1; 6	POR; 2; 6	ITA; 1; 12†	ITA; 2; 9	AUT; 1 Ret	AUT; 2; 7	RUS; 1; 6	RUS; 2; 3									8th	105
2015	Liqui Moly Team Engstler	Volkswagen Golf TCR															RBR; 1; 7	RBR; 2; 6	SIN; 1; 7	SIN; 2; 7	THA; 1 Ret	THA; 2 DNS	MAC; 1; 11	MAC; 2; 3	8th	105
2016	Liqui Moly Team Engstler	Volkswagen Golf GTI TCR	BHR; 1; 10	BHR; 2; 14†	POR; 1; 11	POR; 2; 11	BEL; 1; 11	BEL; 2; 16†																	8th	145
2016	WestCoast Racing	Honda Civic TCR							ITA; 1; 8	ITA; 2; 1	AUT; 1; 1	AUT; 2; 9	GER; 1 Ret	GER; 2; 12	RUS; 1; 4	RUS; 2; 1	THA; 1; 21	**THA**; **2**; 2	SIN; 1; 11	**SIN**; **2**; 1	MYS; 1 Ret	MYS; 2 Ret	MAC; 1; 11	MAC; 2; 7	8th	145

^{†} Driver did not finish the race, but was classified as he completed over 75% of the race distance.
