= Kevin Gleason =

American racing driver

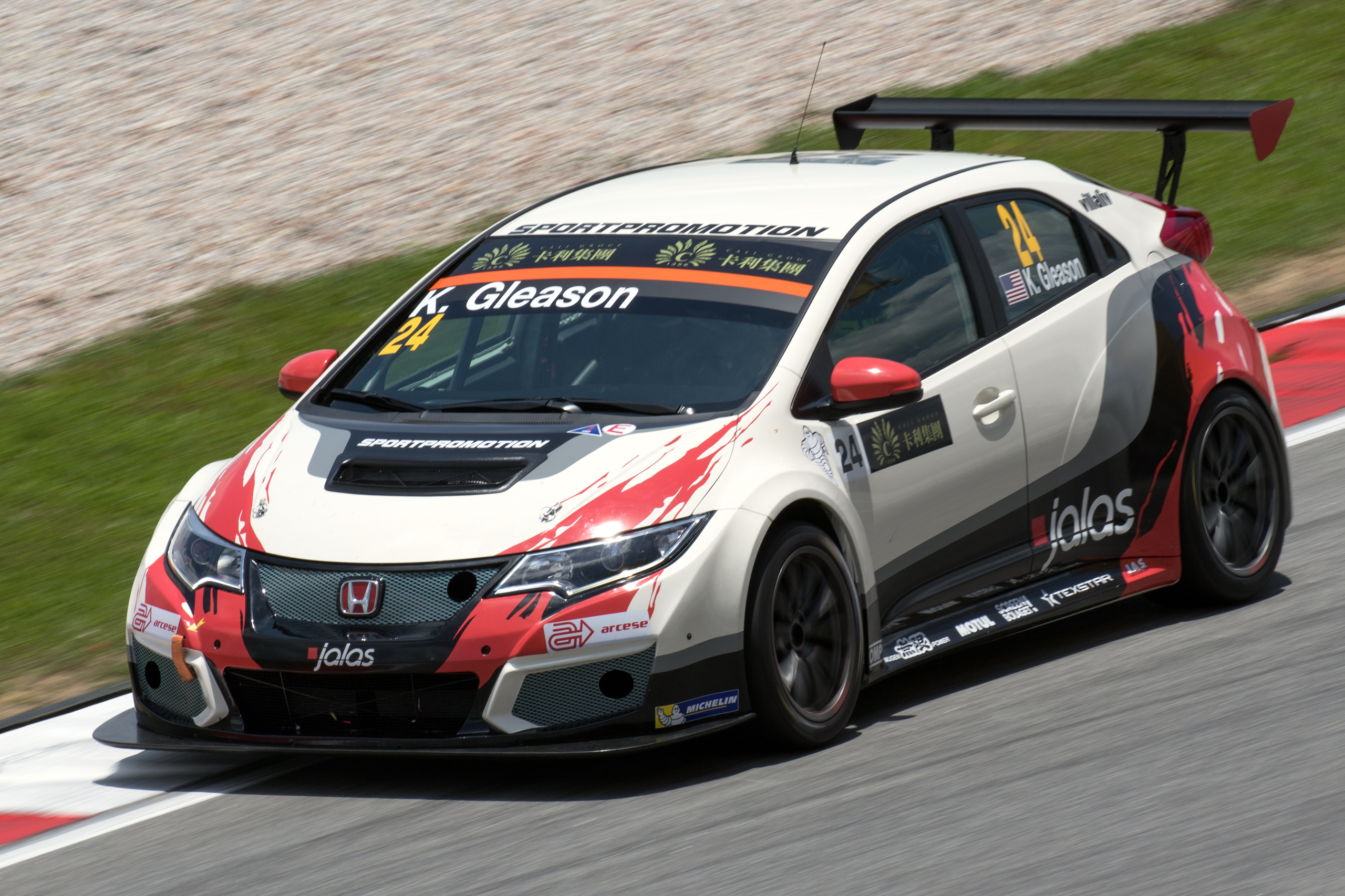
- Nationality: (United States) American
- Born: 7 April 1987 (age 39) Johnstown, Pennsylvania, U.S.

TCR International Series career
- Debut season: 2015
- Current team: WestCoast Racing
- Car number: 24
- Starts: 32
- Wins: 3
- Poles: 2
- Fastest laps: 5
- Best finish: 5th in 2015

Previous series
- 2014 2012-13 2011-14 2010: GT Asia Series; Pirelli World Challenge; Continental Tire Sports Car Challenge; Volkswagen Jetta TDI Cup

\

Kevin Gleason (born 7 April 1987) is an American racing driver currently competing in the TCR International Series. He made his debut in 2015.

== Racing career ==
Gleason began his career in 2010 in the Volkswagen Jetta TDI Cup, ending sixth in the standings. He switched to the Continental Tire Sports Car Challenge in 2011, he won one race and finished eighth in the championship standings that year. He stayed in the championship for three more years. In 2012 and 2013, he had one-off appearances in the Pirelli World Challenge. In February 2015, it was announced that Gleason would make his TCR International Series debut with WestCoast Racing driving a Honda Civic TCR. Gleason took his first pole position in Sepang and his second at Salzburgring, where he also took his first victory. Gleason added a second victory during Race 1 at Marina Bay.

== Racing record ==
=== Complete TCR International Series results ===
(key) (Races in bold indicate pole position) (Races in italics indicate fastest lap)

Year	Team	Car	1	2	3	4	5	6	7	8	9	10	11	12	13	14	15	16	17	18	19	20	21	22	DC	Points
2015	WestCoast Racing	Honda Civic TCR	**SEP**; **1**; 6	SEP; 2; 7	SHA; 1; 3	SHA; 2; 6	VAL; 1; 11	VAL; 2; 4	ALG; 1; 7	**ALG**; **2**; 2	MNZ; 1; 6	MNZ; 2 Ret	**SAL**; **1**; 1	SAL; 2; 6	SOC; 1; 8	**SOC**; **2**; 6	RBR; 1; 5	RBR; 2; 5	MRN; 1; 1	MRN; 2; 5	CHA; 1; 4	CHA; 2; 18†	MAC; 1; 7	MAC; 2 Ret	5th	226
2016	WestCoast Racing	Honda Civic TCR	BHR; 1 Ret	BHR; 2; 13†	EST; 1 Ret	EST; 2; 12	SPA; 1; 6	SPA; 2; 8	IMO; 1	IMO; 2	SAL; 1	SAL; 2	OSC; 1	OSC; 2	SOC; 1	SOC; 2	CHA; 1	CHA; 2	MRN; 1; 8	MRN; 2; 10	SEP; 1; 8	SEP; 2; 1	MAC; 1	MAC; 2	13th	46

^{†} Driver did not finish the race, but was classified as he completed over 75% of the race distance.

=== Complete World Touring Car Championship results ===
(key) (Races in bold indicate pole position) (Races in italics indicate fastest lap)

Year	Team	Car	1	2	3	4	5	6	7	8	9	10	11	12	13	14	15	16	17	18	19	20	DC	Points
2017	RC Motorsport	Lada Vesta WTCC	MAR; 1	MAR; 2	ITA; 1; 9	ITA; 2; 13	HUN; 1; 12	HUN; 2; 12	GER; 1; 12	GER; 2; 11	POR; 1 Ret	POR; 2; 12	ARG; 1; 11	ARG; 2; 13	CHN; 1; 5	CHN; 2; 7‡	**JPN**; **1**; 6	JPN; 2; 8	MAC; 1; 10	MAC; 2; 8	**QAT**; **1**; 3	QAT; 2; 14	13th	47.5

^{‡} Half points awarded as less than 75% of race distance was completed.
