= Lorenzo Veglia =

Italian racing driver (born 1996)

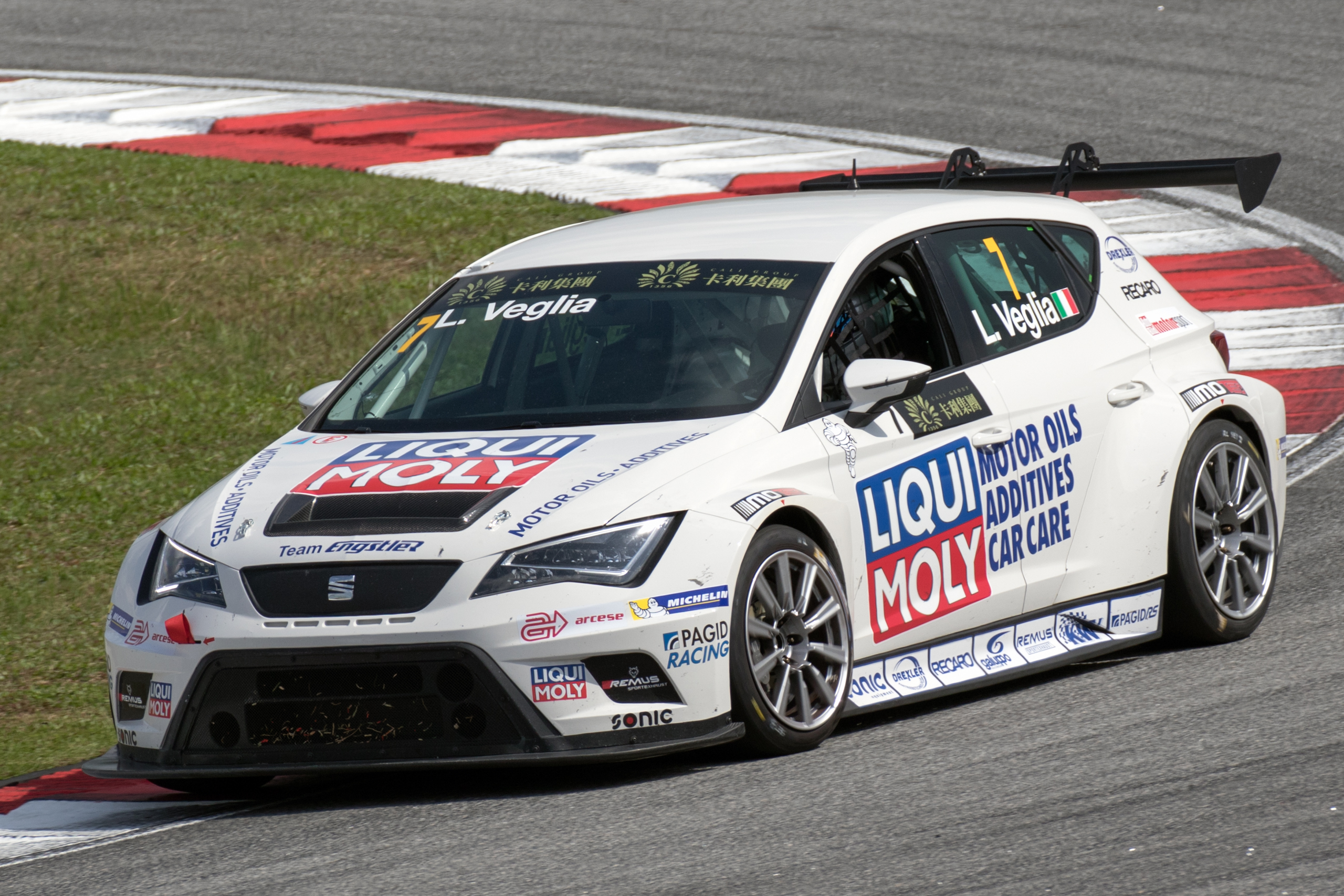
- Nationality: (Italy) Italian
- Born: 7 October 1996 (age 30) Rivoli, Piedmont, Italy

Campionato Italiano Gran Turismo career
- Debut season: 2015
- Current team: LP Racing
- Categorisation: FIA Silver
- Starts: 90
- Wins: 6
- Podiums: 28
- Best finish: 2nd in 2019 Italian GT Championship

Lorenzo Veglia (born 7 October 1996) is an Italian racing driver currently competing in the Italian GT Championship. He made his debut in 2015.

== Racing career ==
Veglia began his career in 2013 in the European Touring Car Cup, he raced in the Super 1600 division. Finishing fourth in the standings that year. During his time in the European Touring Car Cup, he raced under the pseudonym Romeo Luciano. He switched to the SEAT León Eurocup for 2014, he finished the season 12th in the standings. In March 2015, it was announced that Veglia would make his TCR International Series debut with Liqui Moly Team Engstler driving a SEAT León Cup Racer.

== Racing record ==
=== Career summary ===
Season	Series	Team	Races	Wins	Poles	F/Laps	Podiums	Points	Position
2013	European Touring Car Cup - Super 1600	Ravenol Team	9	0	0	2	3	47	4th
2013	Campione Italiano Energie Alternative - BRC Green Hybrid	BRC Racing Team	5	2	1	0	3	86	6th
2014	SEAT León Eurocup	Target Competition	12	0	0	0	1	13	12th
2015	TCR International Series	Liqui Moly Team Engstler	20	0	0	0	1	85	10th
2016	Lamborghini Super Trofeo Europe - Pro-Am	Antonelli Motorsport	12	0	1	0	5	88	**3rd**
2016	Lamborghini Super Trofeo World Final - Pro-Am	Antonelli Motorsport	2	1	0	0	2	27	**1st**
2016	Italian GT Championship - Super GT Cup	Antonelli Motorsport	2	0	0	0	0	9	29th
2017	Italian GT Championship - Super GT3	Antonelli Motorsport	14	3	3	0	10	186	**3rd**
2018	Italian GT Championship - GT3	Antonelli Motorsport	14	0	0	1	3	90	7th
2018	TCR Middle East Series	Pit Lane Competizioni	5	0	0	0	1	41	6th
2019	Italian GT Sprint Championship - GT3 Pro	Easy Race	8	1	0	1	3	53	4th
2019	Italian GT Endurance Championship - GT3 Pro	Easy Race	4	0	0	0	2	?	?
2020	European Le Mans Series - LMP3	BHK Motorsport	4	0	0	0	0	6	26th
2020	European Le Mans Series - LMP3	RLR MSport	1	0	0	0	0	6	26th
2021	Italian GT Endurance Championship - GT3	LP Racing	2	0	0	0	0	3	17th

=== Complete TCR International Series results ===
(key) (Races in bold indicate pole position) (Races in italics indicate fastest lap)

Year	Team	Car	1	2	3	4	5	6	7	8	9	10	11	12	13	14	15	16	17	18	19	20	21	22	DC	Points
2015	Liqui Moly Team Engstler	SEAT León Cup Racer	SEP; 1; 10	SEP; 2; 11	SHA; 1; 11	SHA; 2; 8	VAL; 1; 10	VAL; 2; 7	ALG; 1; 3	ALG; 2 Ret	MNZ; 1; 7	MNZ; 2; 8	SAL; 1; 7	SAL; 2; 11†	SOC; 1	SOC; 2	RBR; 1; 8	RBR; 2; 7	MRN; 1; 8	MRN; 2; 6	CHA; 1; 7	CHA; 2; 5	MAC; 1; 9	MAC; 2 Ret	10th	85

^{†} Driver did not finish the race, but was classified as he completed over 90% of the race distance.
