= Stefano Comini =

Swiss racing driver (born 1990)

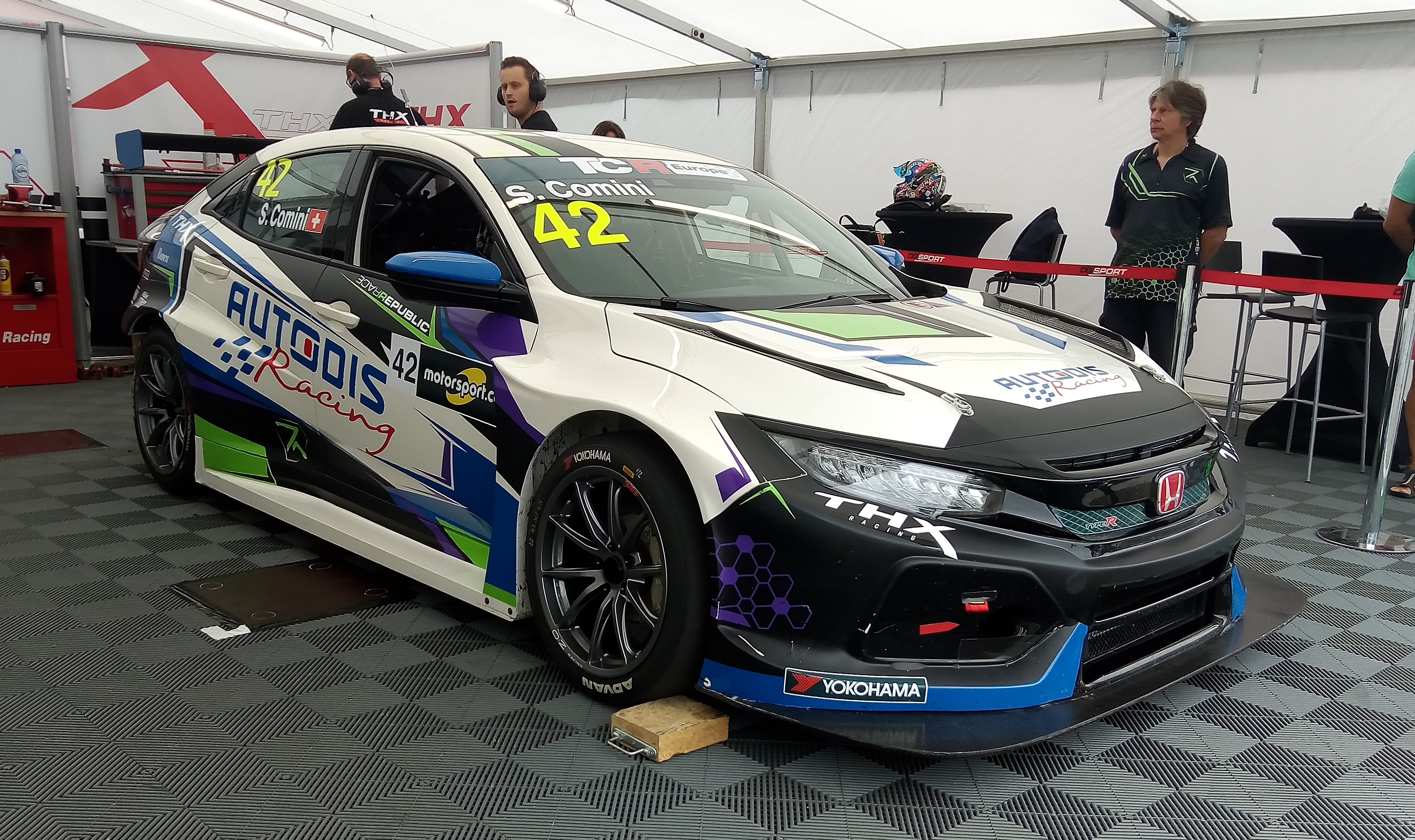
- Comini in 2018
- Nationality: (Switzerland) Swiss
- Born: 3 February 1990 (age 36) Lugano, Switzerland

TCR International Series career
- Debut season: 2015
- Current team: Comtoyou Racing
- Categorisation: FIA Gold (until 2019); FIA Silver (2023–)
- Car number: 1
- Former teams: Leopard Racing, Target Competition
- Starts: 64
- Wins: 12
- Poles: 3
- Fastest laps: 9
- Best finish: 1st in 2015, 2016

Previous series
- 2014 2013 2012–13 2010–13 2008–09 2007–09 2007 2006: SEAT León Eurocup; Renault Clio Cup Bohemia; Renault Clio Cup Italy; Eurocup Mégane Trophy; Formula Renault 2.0 Italy; Formule Renault 2.0 Suisse; Formula 1.6 Monza; Formula Junior Monza 1.2

Championship titles
- 2015-2016 2012 2011: TCR International Series; Renault Clio Cup Italy; Eurocup Mégane Trophy

Stefano Comini (born 3 February 1990) is a Swiss racing driver.

== Career ==
=== Karting ===
Comini debuted in karting in 2002, racing mostly in Italian and Swiss championships, taking titles in the Bridgestone Cup Switzerland ICA in 2004 and 2005 respectively.

=== Early career & Formula Renault ===
Comini began his single-seaters stage of his career in 2006, racing in the Formula Monza 1.2 with Fadini Corse. He won one from seven races that he competed to finish the season on the tenth position.

The following year, Comini moved to the 1.6 category of that series, driving with MG Motorsport. He finished third overall in that year with four wins. He also contested four races of the Formule Renault 2.0 Suisse and two races of the Italian Formula Renault Winter Series.

In 2008, Comini moved to the Italian Formula Renault Championship, racing for Team Dueppì and CO_{2} Motorsport. He finished seventeenth in the series standings. He again competed in four races of the Formule Renault 2.0 Suisse championship and one race in the final round of the season at Monza.

For 2009, Comini had double campaign in both the Italian and Swiss Formula Renault 2.0 championships. He failed to score win in any of the championships, but collected three podiums to finish sixth in Italian Championship and seventh in Swiss Championship. In 2010, he competed his final formula races in the Formula Abarth round at Monza.

=== Sports and touring car racing ===
After three races in 2009 in VLN Endurance, Comini made his debut in Eurocup Mégane Trophy for Oregon Team. He won three from thirteen races, finishing season third behind Nick Catsburg and Pierre Thiriet.

Comini remained in the series for Eurocup Mégane Trophy with the same team. He dominated the season, winning all but three races of the season.

For 2012, Comini moved to the Italian Renault Clio Cup, competing for Composit Motorsport. He achieved five wins to grab the championship title after the first attempt.

In 2013, Comini raced in the Renault Clio Cup Bohemia. He scored four wins at Hockenheim, Nürburgring and Brno, but finished just fifth in the series standings.

In 2014, Comini joined SEAT León Eurocup with Target Competition. He bookended the season with wins at Nürburgring and Barcelona, also he won a reverse-grid race at Silverstone, tying-up with Julien Briché with 58 points.

In 2015, Comini would take part in the new-for-2015 TCR International Series, joining Target Competition.

== Racing record ==
=== Career summary ===
Season	Series	Team	Races	Wins	Poles	F/Laps	Podiums	Points	Position
2006	Formula Monza 1.2	Fadini corse	7	1	1	0	1	92	10th
2007	Formula Monza 1.6	MG Motorsport	12	4	2	3	6	69	**3rd**
2007	Formula Renault 2.0 Italia Winter Series	CO_{2} Motorsport	2	0	0	0	0	6	19th
2007	Formule Renault 2.0 Suisse	Pietro Comini	4	0	0	0	1	38	17th
2008	Formula Renault 2.0 Italy	Dueppì	14	0	0	0	0	47	17th
2008	Formula Renault 2.0 Italy	CO_{2} Motorsport	14	0	0	0	0	47	17th
2008	Formule Renault 2.0 Suisse	CO_{2} Motorsport	4	1	0	0	1	49	13th
2008	Formula 2000 Light	Dueppì	3	0	0	0	2	62	16th
2008	Formula 2000 Light Italy Opening Series	Dueppì	2	0	0	0	2	N/A	NC
2009	Formula Renault 2.0 Italy	CO_{2} Motorsport	14	1	2	1	2	167	8th
2009	Formule Renault 2.0 Suisse	CO_{2} Motorsport	10	6	8	8	9	230	**2nd**
2009	VLN Endurance	Swiss Gentle team	3	1	0	0	1	13.75	414th
2010	Eurocup Mégane Trophy	Oregon Team	14	3	4	3	7	107	**3rd**
2010	Formula Abarth	MG Motorsport	2	0	0	0	0	N/A	NC
2010	24H Series - SP3	Gentle Swiss Racing	1	0	0	0	0	N/A	9th
2011	Eurocup Mégane Trophy	Oregon Team	14	11	12	7	12	305	**1st**
2012	Renault Clio Cup Italy	Composit Motorsport	10	5	3	6	6	133	**1st**
2012	Eurocup Mégane Trophy	Team Lompech Sport	4	0	0	0	2	36	11th
2012	Blancpain Super Trofeo - Pro-Am	Bonaldi Motorsport	2	2	0	0	2	30	9th
2012	Porsche Carrera Cup Italy	Antonelli Motorsport	2	0	0	0	1	16	11th
2012	Porsche Supercup	Antonelli Motorsport	1	0	0	0	0	N/A	NC†
2013	Renault Clio Cup Bohemia	Target Competition	13	4	3	4	6	192	5th
2013	Renault Clio Cup Italy	Target Competition	2	1	0	1	1	N/A	NC†
2013	Eurocup Mégane Trophy	Team Lompech Sport	2	1	0	0	2	N/A	NC†
2014	SEAT León Eurocup	Target Competition	12	3	1	2	4	56	4th
2014	Lamborghini Super Trofeo Europe - Pro-Am		2	0	0	0	0	8	18th
2015	TCR International Series	Target Competition	22	6	1	2	11	342	**1st**
2016	TCR International Series	Leopard Racing	22	3	1	4	10	267.5	**1st**
2016	TCR Benelux Touring Car Championship	Team WRT	3	2	0	1	2	111	13th
2017	TCR International Series	Comtoyou Racing	20	3	1	3	8	196	**3rd**
2017	TCR Benelux Touring Car Championship	Comtoyou Racing	6	2	0	0	2	138	12th
2017	TCR Italian Touring Car Championship	Top Run Motorsport	4	0	0	1	1	24	13th
2018	TCR Europe Series	Race Republic	2	0	0	0	0	41	12th
2018	TCR Europe Series	Autodis Racing by THX	10	0	0	0	0	41	12th
2018	TCR Benelux Series	Autodis Racing by THX	8	2	0	0	5	108	5th

^{†} As Comini was a guest driver, he was ineligible to score points.

=== Complete TCR International Series results ===
(key) (Races in bold indicate pole position) (Races in italics indicate fastest lap)

Year	Team	Car	1	2	3	4	5	6	7	8	9	10	11	12	13	14	15	16	17	18	19	20	21	22	DC	Points
2015	Target Competition	SEAT León Cup Racer	SEP; 1; 1	SEP; 2; 4	SHA; 1; 4	SHA; 2; 2	VAL; 1; 6	VAL; 2; 1	ALG; 1; 5	ALG; 2; 11	MNZ; 1 Ret	MNZ; 2; 4	SAL; 1; 2	SAL; 2; 8	SOC; 1; 4	SOC; 2; 1	RBR; 1; 1	RBR; 2; 9	**MRN**; **1**; 2	MRN; 2; 2	CHA; 1; 5	CHA; 2; 1	MAC; 1; 3	MAC; 2; 1	1st	342
2016	Leopard Racing	Volkswagen Golf GTI TCR	BHR; 1; 7	BHR; 2 Ret	EST; 1; 3	EST; 2; 2	SPA; 1 Ret	SPA; 2; 2	IMO; 1; 1	IMO; 2; 3	SAL; 1; 8	SAL; 2; 3	OSC; 1 Ret	OSC; 2; 6	**SOC**; **1**; 1	SOC; 2; 5	CHA; 1; 4	CHA; 2; 4	MRN; 1; 2	MRN; 2; 4	SEP; 1; 2	SEP; 2; 18	MAC; 1; 1	**MAC**; **2**; 4	1st	267.5
2017	Comtoyou Racing	Audi RS3 LMS TCR	RIM; 1; 3	RIM; 2 Ret	BHR; 1; 8	BHR; 2; 9	**SPA**; **1**; 1	SPA; 2; 3	MNZ; 1; 8	MNZ; 2; 1	SAL; 1; 3	SAL; 2; 3	HUN; 1; 12	HUN; 2; 10	OSC; 1; 6	OSC; 2; 5	CHA; 1; 7	CHA; 2; 3	ZHE; 1; 13	ZHE; 2 Ret	DUB; 1; 7	DUB; 2; 1			3rd	196

=== Complete TCR Europe Series results ===
(key) (Races in bold indicate pole position) (Races in italics indicate fastest lap)

Year	Team	Car	1	2	3	4	5	6	7	8	9	10	11	12	13	14	DC	Points
2018	Race Republic	Subaru WRX STI TCR	LEC; 1; 20	LEC; 2; 10	ZAN; 1	ZAN; 2											12th	41
2018	Autodis Racing by THX	Honda Civic Type R TCR					SPA; 1 Ret	SPA; 2 Ret	HUN; 1; 8	HUN; 2; 8	ASS; 1; 4	ASS; 2; 4	MNZ; 1; 6	MNZ; 2 Ret	CAT; 1 Ret	CAT; 2; 11	12th	41

Sporting positions
Preceded by Nicky Catsburg	Eurocup Mégane Trophy; Champion; 2011	Succeeded by Albert Costa
Preceded by Inaugural	TCR International Series; Champion; 2015, 2016	Succeeded by Jean-Karl Vernay
