= WestCoast Racing =

Swedish motor racing team

(Sweden) WestCoast Racing
- Founded: 1994
- Team principal(s): Dick Jönsson-Wigroth
- Current series: STCC, TCR International Series
- Former series: ETC Cup, Swedish Formula Ford, Volvo S60 Challenge
- Teams' Championships: 2 STCC (2005, 2008)
- Drivers' Championships: 5 STCC (1998, 2004, 2005, 2007, 2010)

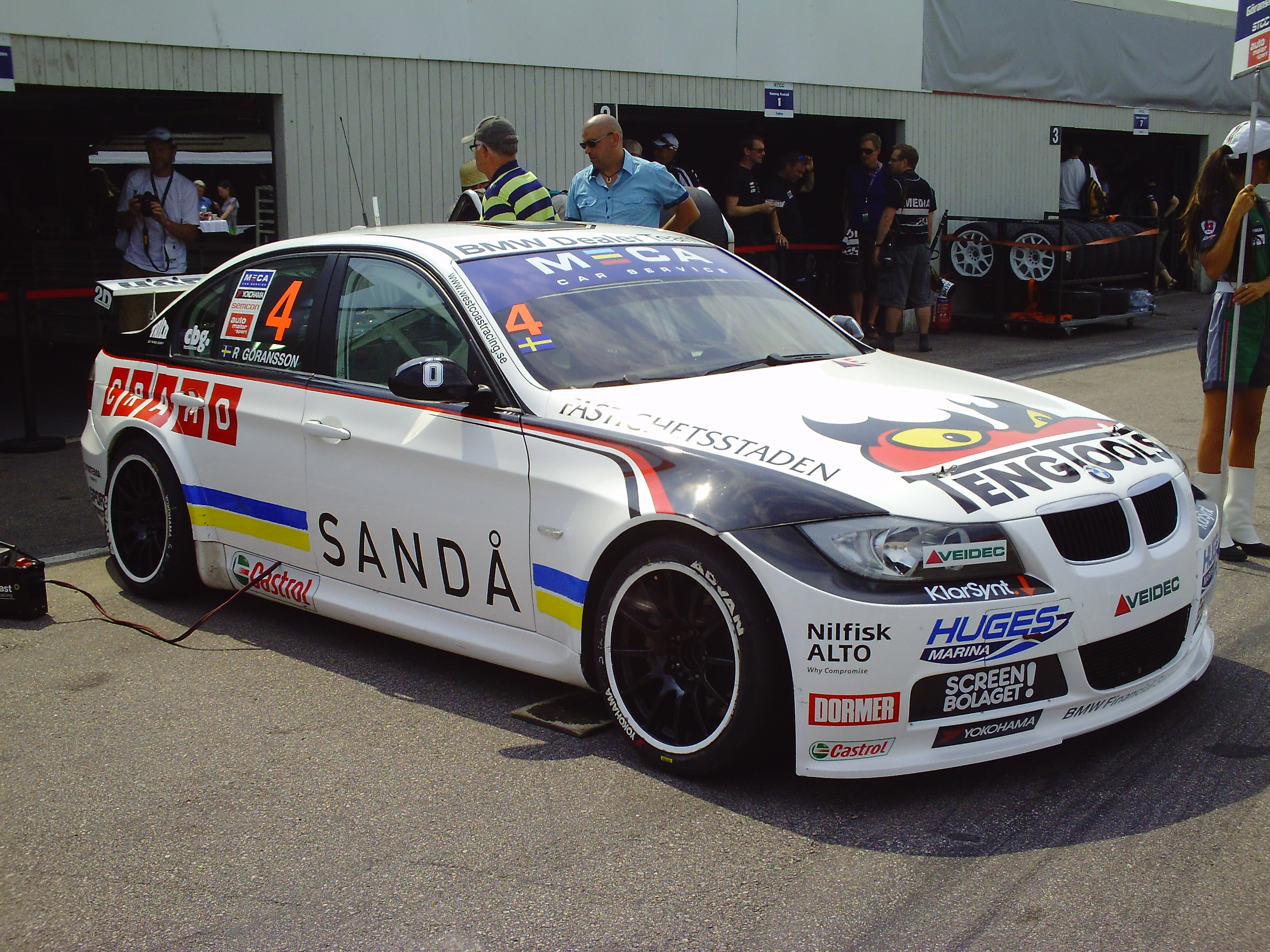
Richard Göransson's WestCoast Racing-run BMW 320si.

WestCoast Racing is a Swedish motor racing team, which was founded in 1994 by Dick Jönsson-Wigroth. The team which is based in Halmstad on the Swedish west coast (hence the name) is one of Sweden's most successful racing team. WestCoast Racing has since the mid-1990s had a strong partnership with BMW and the Swedish dealers and the team is also known as the "BMW Dealer Team".

The team has mainly competed in the STCC, but also in the ETC Cup, FIA Sportscar Championship, Formula Ford and Volvo S60 Challenge. Currently the team is competing in the TCR International Series
