= List of TCR International Series drivers =

This is a List of TCR International Series drivers. It is reported all drivers who have made at least one race start in the TCR International Series. This list is accurate up to the 2017 Dubai round.

== By name ==
Key
Driver who attended at least one event in the World Touring Car Championship

Name	Nation	Seasons	Championship titles	Starts	Poles (Note: Reverse-grid pole positions not included.)	Wins	Podiums	Fastest Laps	Points
Shota Abkhazava	Georgia	2017	0	2	0	0	0	0	0
Sergey Afanasyev	Russia	2015-2016	0	42	1	0	4	1	275
Salman Al Khalifa	Bahrain	2016	0	2	0	0	0	0	2
Giacomo Altoè	Italy	2017	0	16	0	0	1	0	63
Rodolfo Ávila	Macau	2015	0	2	0	0	0	0	10
Andrea Belicchi	Italy	2015-2016	0	22	0	1	6	1	190
István Bernula	Hungary	2017	0	1	0	0	0	0	0
Enrico Bettera	Italy	2017	0	2	0	0	0	0	0
Tom Boardman	United Kingdom	2015	0	2	0	0	0	0	1
Dušan Borković	Serbia	2016-2017	0	39	2	2	8	2	291
Paritat Bulbon	Thailand	2016	0	2	0	0	0	0	0
Antti Buri	Finland	2016	0	6	0	0	1	0	30
Martin Cao	China	2016	0	2	0	0	0	0	0
Daniele Cappellari	Italy	2017	0	2	0	0	0	0	0
David Cebrián	Spain	2015	0	2	0	0	0	0	8
Michela Cerruti	Italy	2015-2017	0	14	0	0	0	0	3
Keith Chan	Hong Kong	2015	0	2	0	0	0	0	2
Samson Chan	Hong Kong	2015	0	6	0	0	0	0	0
Jian Hong Chen	Taiwan	2016	0	2	0	0	0	0	0
Michael Choi	Hong Kong	2015	0	6	0	0	0	0	0
George Chou	Taiwan	2015	0	2	0	0	0	0	0
Jimmy Clairet	France	2016	0	2	0	0	0	0	0
Roberto Colciago	Italy	2016-2017	0	19	1	4	5	0	189
Stefano Comini	Switzerland	2015-2017	2 (2015, 2016)	64	3	12	27	8	805.5
Aurélien Comte	France	2017	0	2	0	0	0	0	0
Tom Coronel	Netherlands	2017	0	2	0	0	0	0	4
Pierre-Yves Corthals	Belgium	2016-2017	0	10	0	0	0	0	20
Guillaume Cunnington	France	2015	0	2	0	0	0	0	0
Lucile Cypriano	France	2015	0	2	0	0	0	0	0
Antonio D'Amico	Italy	2015	0	2	0	0	0	0	3
Grégoire Demoustier	France	2017	0	6	0	0	0	0	0
Filipe de Souza	Macau	2015-2016	0	8	0	0	0	0	0
Aleksey Dudukalo	Russia	2015	0	2	0	0	0	0	2
Denis Dupont	Belgium	2017	0	3	0	0	0	0	0
Duncan Ende	United States	2017	0	18	0	0	0	0	9
Franz Engstler	Germany	2015	0	6	0	0	0	0	16
Luca Engstler	Germany	2017	0	2	0	0	0	0	0
Tomas Engström	Sweden	2015	0	6	0	0	0	0	21
Carlotta Fedeli	Italy	2016	0	2	0	0	0	0	2
Luigi Ferrara	Italy	2016-2017	0	3	0	0	0	0	4
Mario Ferraris	Italy	2016	0	2	0	0	0	0	0
Ferenc Ficza	Hungary	2015, 2017	0	14	0	0	1	0	35
Josh Files	United Kingdom	2015-2017	0	6	0	0	1	0	27.5
Petr Fulín	Czech Republic	2016	0	9	0	0	0	0	15
Rafaël Galiana	France	2015-2017	0	13	0	0	0	0	7
Jordi Gené	Spain	2015-2016	0	24	1	3	10	1	301
Kevin Gleason	United States	2015-2016	0	32	2	3	5	5	272
Mikhail Grachev	Russia	2015-2016	0	43	0	4	7	1	250
Grégory Guilvert	France	2016	0	2	0	0	0	0	0
Anett György	Hungary	2017	0	2	0	0	0	0	0
Nattachak Hanjitkasen	Thailand	2016-2017	0	4	0	0	0	0	0
Loris Hezemans	Netherlands	2015-2016	0	12	0	0	1	0	42
Henry Ho	Macau	2015	0	2	0	0	0	0	0
Michael Ho	Macau	2016	0	0	0	0	0	0	0
Robb Holland	United States	2015	0	4	0	0	0	0	8
Maťo Homola	Slovakia	2016-2017	0	41	4	1	5	3	251
Johnson Huang	Taiwan	2015	0	2	0	0	0	0	0
Robert Huff	United Kingdom	2015, 2017	0	11	2	2	5	1	136
Alex Hui	Hong Kong	2016	0	2	0	0	0	0	0
Narasak Ittiritpong	Thailand	2016	0	2	0	0	0	0	0
Florian Janits	Austria	2016	0	2	0	0	0	0	3
Márk Jedlóczky	Hungary	2017	0	2	0	0	0	0	0
Tengyi Jiang	China	2015-2017	0	6	0	0	0	0	2
Thomas Jäger	Austria	2017	0	2	0	0	0	1	25
Davit Kajaia	Georgia	2016-2017	0	42	1	1	2	2	157
Hussain Karimi	Bahrain	2016	0	2	0	0	0	0	0
Douglas Khoo	Malaysia	2015-2017	0	8	0	0	0	0	0
Danny Kroes	Netherlands	2017	0	2	0	0	0	0	2
Kantadhee Kusiri	Thailand	2016-2017	0	4	0	0	0	0	11
Kari-Pekka Laaksonen	Finland	2016	0	2	0	0	0	0	0
Edgar Lau	Hong Kong	2016	0	2	0	0	0	1	0
Kenneth Lau	Hong Kong	2015	0	5	0	0	0	0	0
Rattanin Leenutaphong	Thailand	2017	0	2	0	0	0	0	0
Nattanid Leewattanavaragul	Thailand	2017	0	2	0	0	0	0	0
Jack Lemvard	Thailand	2016	0	2	0	0	0	0	0
Benjamin Lessennes	Belgium	2017	0	2	0	0	1	0	31
Benjamin Leuchter	Germany	2017	0	2	0	0	0	0	13
Daniel Lloyd	United Kingdom	2017	0	10	0	0	1	0	50
Sam Lok	Hong Kong	2015	0	0	0	0	0	0	0
William Lok	Hong Kong	2016	0	0	0	0	0	0	0
Hon Kei Lou	Macau	2016	0	2	0	0	0	0	0
Kenneth Ma	Hong Kong	2015-2016	0	1	0	0	0	0	0
Niklas Mackschin	Germany	2016	0	2	0	0	0	0	6
Hing Tak Mak	Hong Kong	2015	0	0	0	0	0	0	0
Gabriele Marotta	Monaco (Note: Marotta is Italian but uses Monegasque citizenship.)	2015	0	2	0	0	0	0	1
Alain Menu	Switzerland	2015, 2017	0	7	0	0	0	0	1
Norbert Michelisz	Hungary	2017	0	4	1	1	2	1	59
Alexander Mies	Germany	2016	0	2	0	0	0	0	0
Edouard Mondron	Belgium	2017	0	2	0	0	0	0	18
Guillaume Mondron	Belgium	2017	0	2	0	0	0	0	0
Fernando Monje	Spain	2015	0	4	0	0	1	0	26
Tiago Monteiro	Portugal	2016	0	2	0	1	2	0	23
José Monroy	Portugal	2015	0	2	0	0	0	0	14
Francisco Mora	Portugal	2015-2016	0	5	0	0	0	0	8
Gianni Morbidelli	Italy	2015-2017	0	61	6	6	18	9	549
René Münnich	Germany	2015	0	8	0	0	1	0	34
Jens Reno Møller	Denmark	2017	0	10	0	0	1	0	25
Dániel Nagy	Hungary	2015, 2017	0	2	0	0	0	0	3
James Nash	United Kingdom	2015-2017	0	42	0	7	8	2	393
Alessandra Neri	Italy	2016	0	2	0	0	0	0	1
Oscar Nogués	Spain	2015	0	4	0	0	0	0	8
Chariya Nuya	Thailand	2017	0	2	0	0	0	0	0
Michel Nykjær	Denmark	2015	0	13	0	2	3	0	100
William O'Brien	Hong Kong (Note: O'Brien is American but uses Hong Kongese citizenship.)	2016	0	2	0	0	0	0	0
Jordi Oriola	Spain	2015-2016	0	12	0	0	0	1	31
Pepe Oriola	Spain	2015-2017	0	59	2	7	24	9	672.5
Markus Östreich	Germany	2015	0	2	0	0	0	0	1
Aurélien Panis	France	2017	0	7	0	1	1	2	27
Armando Parente	Portugal	2015	0	0	0	0	0	0	0
Nicky Pastorelli	Netherlands	2016	0	2	0	0	0	0	0
Stian Paulsen	Norway	2017	0	10	0	0	0	0	4
Aku Pellinen	Finland	2016	0	6	0	1	1	0	63
Maxime Potty	Belgium	2017	0	2	0	0	0	0	0
Harald Proczyk	Austria	2016	0	2	1	0	0	0	5
Pasarit Promsombat	Thailand	2017	0	2	0	0	0	0	0
Kevin Pu	China	2015	0	2	0	0	0	0	0
Ildar Rakhmatullin	Russia	2015-2016	0	4	0	0	0	0	1
Luca Rangoni	Italy	2015-2016	0	4	0	0	0	0	0
Davide Roda	Italy	2015	0	0	0	0	0	0	0
Diego Romanini	Italy	2015	0	2	0	0	0	0	0
Pol Rosell	Spain	2015	0	2	0	1	1	0	27
Munkong Sathienthirakul	Thailand	2015-2017	0	6	0	0	0	0	2
Bas Schouten	Netherlands	2015	0	4	0	0	0	0	10
Gary Sheehan	United States	2016	0	2	0	0	0	0	0
Gordon Shedden	United Kingdom	2017	0	2	1	0	1	0	31
Vladimir Sheshenin	Russia	2016	0	2	0	0	0	0	1
Igor Skuz	Ukraine	2015	0	13	0	0	0	0	10
Tin Sritrai	Thailand	2015-2016	0	6	0	0	0	0	8
Grant Supaphongs	Thailand	2016	0	2	0	0	0	0	0
Zsolt Szabó	Hungary	2015	0	3	0	0	0	0	10
Chi Lun Tang	Hong Kong	2016	0	1	0	0	0	0	0
Gabriele Tarquini	Italy	2017	0	4	0	1	1	2	0
Attila Tassi	Hungary	2016-2017	0	40	0	2	7	1	219
Nicki Thiim	Denmark	2015	0	2	1	1	1	2	30
Csaba Tóth	Hungary	2017	0	2	0	0	0	0	0
Norbert Tóth	Hungary	2015	0	2	0	0	0	0	4
Kevin Tse	Macau	2016	0	4	0	0	0	0	0
Terence Tse	Hong Kong	2016	0	0	0	0	0	0	0
Hugo Valente	France	2015, 2017	0	10	0	0	2	0	46
Kelvin van der Linde	South Africa	2015	0	2	0	0	0	0	13
Jaap van Lagen	Netherlands	2017	0	4	0	0	0	0	8
Lorenzo Veglia	Italy	2015	0	20	0	0	1	0	85
Jean-Karl Vernay	France	2016-2017	1 (2017)	41	2	4	14	4	472
Frédéric Vervisch	Belgium	2017	0	16	1	0	1	1	84
Milovan Vesnić	Serbia	2017	0	3	0	0	0	0	0
Neric Wei	China	2016	0	4	0	0	0	0	0
Dan Wells	United Kingdom	2015	0	0	0	0	0	0	0
Sunny Wong	Hong Kong	2015-2016	0	4	0	0	0	0	0
Andy Yan	Hong Kong	2016	0	4	0	0	0	0	4.5
Frank Yu	Hong Kong	2015	0	5	0	0	0	0	2
Ya Qi Zhang	China	2016	0	2	0	0	0	0	0
Zhendong Zhang	China	2017	0	2	0	0	0	0	10

== By nationality ==
Country	Total drivers	Champions	Championships	First driver(s)	Last driver(s)
Austria	3	0	0	Florian Janits, Harald Proczyk (Salzburgring 2016)	Thomas Jäger (Salzburgring 2017)
Bahrain	2	0	0	Salman Al Khalifa, Hussain Karimi (Sakhir 2016)	Salman Al Khalifa, Hussain Karimi (Sakhir 2016)
Belgium	7	0	0	Pierre-Yves Corthals (Spa-Francorchamps 2016)	Frédéric Vervisch, Denis Dupont (Dubai 2017)
China	6	0	0	Jiang Tengyi (Shanghai 2015)	Tengyi Jiang, Zhendong Zhang (Zhejiang 2017)
Czech Republic	1	0	0	Petr Fulín (Salzburgring 2016)	Petr Fulín (Macau 2016)
Denmark	3	0	0	Michel Nykjær (Sepang 2015)	Jens Reno Møller (Oschersleben 2017)
Finland	3	0	0	Aku Pellinen (Sakhir 2016)	Antti Buri (Macau 2016)
France	10	1 (Jean-Karl Vernay)	1 (2017)	Lucile Cypriano (Valencia 2015)	Aurélien Comte, Aurélien Panis, Jean-Karl Vernay (Dubai 2017)
Georgia	2	0	0	Davit Kajaia (Sakhir 2016)	Davit Kajaia (Dubai 2017)
Germany	7	0	0	Franz Engstler, René Münnich (Sepang 2015)	Benjamin Leuchter (Dubai 2017)
Hong Kong	16	0	0	Frank Yu (Sepang 2015)	Alex Hui, Edgar Lau, William Lok, Kenneth Ma, William O'Brien, Tang Chi Lun, Terence Tse, Sunny Wong, Andy Yan (Macau 2016)
Hungary	10	0	0	Ferenc Ficza (Sepang 2015)	Attila Tassi (Dubai 2017)
Italy	17	0	0	Andrea Belicchi, Gianni Morbidelli, Diego Romanini, Lorenzo Veglia (Sepang 2015)	Roberto Colciago, Gianni Morbidelli, Gabriele Tarquini (Dubai 2017)
Macau	6	0	0	Filipe de Souza (Singapore 2015)	Michael Ho, Lou Hon Kei, Kevin Tse (Macau 2016)
Malaysia	1	0	0	Douglas Khoo (Buriram 2015)	Douglas Khoo (Buriram 2017)
Monaco	1	0	0	Gabriele Marotta (Red Bull Ring 2015)	Gabriele Marotta (Red Bull Ring 2015)
Netherlands	6	0	0	Bas Schouten (Valencia 2015)	Danny Kroes, Jaap van Lagen (Oschersleben 2017)
Norway	1	0	0	Stian Paulsen (Spa-Francorchamps 2017)	Stian Paulsen (Oschersleben 2017)
Portugal	4	0	0	José Monroy, Francisco Mora, Armando Parente (Portimão 2015)	Tiago Monteiro (Macau 2016)
Russia	5	0	0	Sergey Afanasyev, Mikhail Grachev (Sepang 2015)	Sergey Afanasyev, Mikhail Grachev (Macau 2016)
Serbia	2	0	0	Dušan Borković (Sakhir 2016)	Dušan Borković (Dubai 2017)
Slovakia	1	0	0	Maťo Homola (Sakhir 2016)	Maťo Homola (Dubai 2017)
South Africa	1	0	0	Kelvin van der Linde (Portimão 2015)	Kelvin van der Linde (Portimão 2015)
Spain	7	0	0	Jordi Gené, Jordi Oriola, Pepe Oriola (Sepang 2015)	Pepe Oriola (Dubai 2017)
Sweden	1	0	0	Tomas Engström (Sochi 2015)	Tomas Engström (Buriram 2015)
Switzerland	2	2 (Stefano Comini)	2 (2015, 2016)	Stefano Comini (Shanghai 2015)	Stefano Comini, Alain Menu (Dubai 2017)
Taiwan	3	0	0	George Chou (Singapore 2015)	Chen Jian Hong (Buriram 2016)
Thailand	12	0	0	Munkong Sathienthirakul, Tin Sritrai (Buriram 2015)	Nattachak Hanjitkasen, Kantadhee Kusiri, Rattanin Leenutaphong, Nattanid Leewattanavaragul, Chariya Nuya, Pasarit Promsombat, Munkong Sathienthirakul (Buriram 2017)
Ukraine	1	0	0	Igor Skuz (Sepang 2015)	Igor Skuz (Red Bull Ring 2015)
United Kingdom	7	0	0	Tom Boardman (Monza 2015)	Josh Files, Daniel Lloyd, James Nash, Gordon Shedden (Dubai 2017)
United States	4	0	0	Kevin Gleason (Sepang 2015)	Duncan Ende (Dubai 2017)
