= 2015 TCR International Series Portimão round =

(Portugal) 2015 TCR International Series Portimão round
Round details
- Round 4 of 11 rounds in the 2015 TCR International Series
- Layout of the Algarve International Circuit
- Location: Algarve International Circuit, Portimão, Portugal
- Course: Permanent racing facility 4.652 km (2.891 mi)

TCR International Series

Race 1
- Date: 10 May 2015
- Laps: 13

Pole position
Driver	(Denmark) Nicki Thiim	Liqui Moly Team Engstler
- Time: 1:53.863

Podium
First	(Denmark) Nicki Thiim	Liqui Moly Team Engstler
Second	(Spain) Jordi Gené	Team Craft-Bamboo Lukoil
Third	(Italy) Lorenzo Veglia	Liqui Moly Team Engstler

Fastest lap
Driver	(Denmark) Nicki Thiim	Liqui Moly Team Engstler
- Time: 1:54.529 (on lap 2)

Race 2
- Date: 10 May 2015
- Laps: 13

Podium
First	(Denmark) Michel Nykjær	Target Competition
Second	(United States) Kevin Gleason	WestCoast Racing
Third	(Spain) Jordi Gené	Team Craft-Bamboo Lukoil

Fastest lap
Driver	(Denmark) Nicki Thiim	Liqui Moly Team Engstler
- Time: 1:54.591 (on lap 2)

The 2015 TCR International Series Portimão round was the fourth round of the 2015 TCR International Series season. It took place on 10 May at the Algarve International Circuit.

Nicki Thiim won the first race, starting from pole position, driving an Audi TT Cup and Michel Nykjær gained the second one, driving a SEAT León Cup Racer.

== Success Ballast ==
Due to the results obtained in the previous round, Pepe Oriola received +30 kg, Stefano Comini +20 kg and Michel Nykjær +10 kg.

== Classification ==
=== Qualifying ===
Pos.	No.	Driver	Car	Team	Q1	Q2	Grid	Points
1	3	(Denmark) Nicki Thiim	Audi TT Cup	(Germany) Liqui Moly Team Engstler	1:54.172	1:53.863	1	5
2	88	(Spain) Jordi Gené	SEAT León Cup Racer	(United Kingdom) Team Craft-Bamboo Lukoil	1:54.857	1:54.621	2	4
3	74	(Spain) Pepe Oriola	SEAT León Cup Racer	(United Kingdom) Team Craft-Bamboo Lukoil	1:54.852	1:54.699	3	3
4	7	(Italy) Lorenzo Veglia	SEAT León Cup Racer	(Germany) Liqui Moly Team Engstler	1:55.778	1:54.786	4	2
5	9	(South Africa) Kelvin van der Linde	Audi TT Cup	(Germany) Liqui Moly Team Engstler	1:55.132	1:54.842	5	1
6	10	(Italy) Gianni Morbidelli	Honda Civic Type R TCR (FK2)	(Sweden) WestCoast Racing	1:55.572	1:54.945	6	
7	25	(Switzerland) Stefano Comini	SEAT León Cup Racer	(Italy) Target Competition	1:55.523	1:54.969	7	
8	77	(Russia) Sergey Afanasyev	SEAT León Cup Racer	(United Kingdom) Team Craft-Bamboo Lukoil	1:55.094	1:55.080	8	
9	17	(Denmark) Michel Nykjær	SEAT León Cup Racer	(Italy) Target Competition	1:55.246	1:55.277	9	
10	24	(United States) Kevin Gleason	Honda Civic Type R TCR (FK2)	(Sweden) WestCoast Racing	1:55.590	1:55.369	10	
11	33	(Italy) Andrea Belicchi	SEAT León Cup Racer	(Italy) Target Competition	1:55.247	1:55.411	11	
12	50	(Portugal) Francisco Mora	SEAT León Cup Racer	(Portugal) Veloso Motorsport	1:55.755	1:55.779	12	
13	19	(Spain) Oscar Nogués	Opel Astra OPC	(Spain) Campos Racing	1:55.868		13	
14	8	(Russia) Mikhail Grachev	SEAT León Cup Racer	(Germany) Liqui Moly Team Engstler	1:56.291		14	
15	18	(Portugal) José Monroy	SEAT León Cup Racer	(Portugal) Veloso Motorsport	1:56.437		15	
16	20	(Ukraine) Igor Skuz	Honda Civic Type R TCR (FK2)	(Sweden) WestCoast Racing	1:58.533		16	
17	22	(Portugal) Armando Parente	Opel Astra OPC	(Spain) Campos Racing	withdrew			

=== Race 1 ===
Pos.	No.	Driver	Car	Team	Laps	Time/Retired	Grid	Points
1	3	(Denmark) Nicki Thiim	Audi TT Cup	(Germany) Liqui Moly Team Engstler	13	25:13.998	1	25
2	88	(Spain) Jordi Gené	SEAT León Cup Racer	(United Kingdom) Team Craft-Bamboo Lukoil	13	+4.074	2	18
3	7	(Italy) Lorenzo Veglia	SEAT León Cup Racer	(Germany) Liqui Moly Team Engstler	13	+6.541	4	15
4	9	(South Africa) Kelvin van der Linde	Audi TT Cup	(Germany) Liqui Moly Team Engstler	13	+12.086	5	12
5	25	(Switzerland) Stefano Comini	SEAT León Cup Racer	(Italy) Target Competition	13	+14.541	7	10
6	8	(Russia) Mikhail Grachev	SEAT León Cup Racer	(Germany) Liqui Moly Team Engstler	13	+17.893	14	8
7	24	(United States) Kevin Gleason	Honda Civic Type R TCR (FK2)	(Sweden) WestCoast Racing	13	+20.094	10	6
8	18	(Portugal) José Monroy	SEAT León Cup Racer	(Portugal) Veloso Motorsport	13	+20.425	15	4
9	19	(Spain) Oscar Nogués	Opel Astra OPC	(Spain) Campos Racing	13	+23.044	13	2
10	50	(Portugal) Francisco Mora	SEAT León Cup Racer	(Portugal) Veloso Motorsport	13	+30.107	12	1
11	77	(Russia) Sergey Afanasyev	SEAT León Cup Racer	(United Kingdom) Team Craft-Bamboo Lukoil	13	+35.348	8	
12	33	(Italy) Andrea Belicchi	SEAT León Cup Racer	(Italy) Target Competition	13	+42.451	11	
13	20	(Spain) Igor Skuz	Honda Civic Type R TCR (FK2)	(Sweden) WestCoast Racing	13	+50.142	16	
Ret	74	(Spain) Pepe Oriola	SEAT León Cup Racer	(United Kingdom) Team Craft-Bamboo Lukoil	8	Puncture	3	
Ret	10	(Italy) Gianni Morbidelli	Honda Civic Type R TCR (FK2)	(Sweden) WestCoast Racing	8	Collision	6	
Ret	17	(Denmark) Michel Nykjær	SEAT León Cup Racer	(Italy) Target Competition	2	Collision	9	
WD	22	(Portugal) Armando Parente	Opel Astra OPC	(Spain) Campos Racing		Withdrew		

=== Race 2 ===
Pos.	No.	Driver	Car	Team	Laps	Time/Retired	Grid	Points
1	17	(Denmark) Michel Nykjær	SEAT León Cup Racer	(Italy) Target Competition	13	35:18.975	2	25
2	24	(United States) Kevin Gleason	Honda Civic Type R TCR (FK2)	(Sweden) WestCoast Racing	13	+3.152	1	18
3	88	(Spain) Jordi Gené	SEAT León Cup Racer	(United Kingdom) Team Craft-Bamboo Lukoil	13	+6.360	9	15
4	74	(Spain) Pepe Oriola	SEAT León Cup Racer	(United Kingdom) Team Craft-Bamboo Lukoil	13	+7.020	8	12
5	18	(Portugal) José Monroy	SEAT León Cup Racer	(Portugal) Veloso Motorsport	13	+7.496	14	10
6	8	(Russia) Mikhail Grachev	SEAT León Cup Racer	(Germany) Liqui Moly Team Engstler	13	+11.040	16^{1}	8
7	19	(Spain) Oscar Nogués	Opel Astra OPC	(Spain) Campos Racing	13	+12.030	13	6
8	50	(Portugal) Francisco Mora	SEAT León Cup Racer	(Portugal) Veloso Motorsport	13	+20.999	12	4
9	20	(Ukraine) Igor Skuz	Honda Civic Type R TCR (FK2)	(Sweden) WestCoast Racing	13	+22.644	15	2
10	33	(Italy) Andrea Belicchi	SEAT León Cup Racer	(Italy) Target Competition	13	+24.865	11	1
11	25	(Switzerland) Stefano Comini	SEAT León Cup Racer	(Italy) Target Competition	13	+39.366	4	
12	9	(South Africa) Kelvin van der Linde	Audi TT Cup	(Germany) Liqui Moly Team Engstler	10	Technical	6	
13	3	(Denmark) Nicki Thiim	Audi TT Cup	(Germany) Liqui Moly Team Engstler	10	Puncture	10	
Ret	7	(Italy) Lorenzo Veglia	SEAT León Cup Racer	(Germany) Liqui Moly Team Engstler	2	Collision	7	
Ret	10	(Italy) Gianni Morbidelli	Honda Civic Type R TCR (FK2)	(Sweden) WestCoast Racing	1	Collision	5	
Ret	77	(Russia) Sergey Afanasyev	SEAT León Cup Racer	(United Kingdom) Team Craft-Bamboo Lukoil	1	Technical	3	
WD	22	(Portugal) Armando Parente	Opel Astra OPC	(Spain) Campos Racing		Withdrew		

Notes:

- ^1 — Mikhail Grachev was moved to the back of the grid because of a parc fermé infringement.

== Standings after the event ==
Drivers' Championship standings

	Pos	Driver	Points
	1	(Switzerland) Stefano Comini	116
1	2	(Spain) Pepe Oriola	104
1	3	(Italy) Gianni Morbidelli	91
2	4	(Spain) Jordi Gené	90
	5	(United States) Kevin Gleason	81

Teams' Championship standings

Pos	Driver	Points
1	(Italy) Target Competition	248
2	(United Kingdom) Team Craft-Bamboo Lukoil	222
3	(Sweden) WestCoast Racing	194
4	(Germany) Liqui Moly Team Engstler	121
5	(Portugal) Veloso Motorsport	26

- Note: Only the top five positions are included for both sets of drivers' standings.
