= 2017 TCR International Series Dubai round =

(United Arab Emirates) 2017 TCR International Series Dubai round
Round details
- Round 10 of 10 rounds in the 2017 TCR International Series
- Layout of the Dubai Autodrome
- Location: Dubai Autodrome, Dubai, United Arab Emirates
- Course: Permanent racing facility 3.560 km (2.212 mi)

TCR International Series

Race 1
- Date: 18 November 2017
- Laps: 19

Pole position
Driver	(United Kingdom) Gordon Shedden	Leopard Racing Team WRT
- Time: 1:27.849

Podium
First	(Spain) Pepe Oriola	Lukoil Craft-Bamboo Racing
Second	(United Kingdom) Gordon Shedden	Leopard Racing Team WRT
Third	(France) Jean-Karl Vernay	Leopard Racing Team WRT

Fastest lap
Driver	(Spain) Pepe Oriola	Lukoil Craft-Bamboo Racing
- Time: 1:28.733 (on lap 4)

Race 2
- Date: 18 November 2017
- Laps: 17

Podium
First	(Switzerland) Stefano Comini	Comtoyou Racing
Second	(Italy) Gianni Morbidelli	WestCoast Racing
Third	(United Kingdom) Josh Files	M1RA

Fastest lap
Driver	(Italy) Gabriele Tarquini	BRC Racing Team
- Time: 1:28.912 (on lap 4)

The 2017 TCR International Series Dubai round was the tenth and final round of the 2017 TCR International Series season. It took place on 18 November at the Dubai Autodrome.

Pepe Oriola won the first race starting from fourth, driving a SEAT León TCR, while Stefano Comini gained the second one starting from second, driving an Audi RS3 LMS TCR.

Jean-Karl Vernay won the Drivers championship, after out scoring main rival Attila Tassi in Race 1. Tassi then defended the runner-up spot in the championship from Stefano Comini, finishing just 1 point ahead of Comini, following Race 2. M1RA won the Teams championship, while the Volkswagen Golf GTI TCR secured the Model of the Year championship, in the second race.

== Ballast ==
Due to the results obtained in the previous round, Robert Huff received +30 kg, Gianni Morbidelli received +20 kg and both Jean-Karl Vernay and Gabriele Tarquini received +10 kg. However, since Robert Huff didn't take part in the event, he didn't take the ballast.

== Classification ==
=== Qualifying ===
Pos.	No.	Driver	Car	Team	Q1	Q2	Grid	Points
1	73	(United Kingdom) Gordon Shedden	Volkswagen Golf GTI TCR	(Luxembourg) Leopard Racing Team WRT	1:28.965	1:27.849	1	5
2	2	(France) Jean-Karl Vernay	Volkswagen Golf GTI TCR	(Luxembourg) Leopard Racing Team WRT	1:28.457	1:28.045	2	4
3	13	(Germany) Benjamin Leuchter	Volkswagen Golf GTI TCR	(Sweden) WestCoast Racing	1:28.425	1:28.119	3	3
4	74	(Spain) Pepe Oriola	SEAT León TCR	(Hong Kong) Lukoil Craft-Bamboo Racing	1:28.731	1:28.179	4	2
5	10	(Italy) Gianni Morbidelli	Volkswagen Golf GTI TCR	(Sweden) WestCoast Racing	1:28.709	1:28.195	5	1
6	4	(Belgium) Denis Dupont	SEAT León TCR	(Belgium) Comtoyou Racing	1:28.154	1:28.256	6	
7	27	(France) Aurélien Comte	Opel Astra TCR	(Belgium) DG Sport Compétition	1:28.892	1:28.364	7	
8	17	(United Kingdom) Daniel Lloyd	SEAT León TCR	(Hong Kong) Lukoil Craft-Bamboo Racing	1:28.642	1:28.623	8	
9	1	(Switzerland) Stefano Comini	Audi RS3 LMS TCR	(Belgium) Comtoyou Racing	1:28.596	1:28.674	9	
10	9	(Hungary) Attila Tassi	Honda Civic Type-R TCR	(Hungary) M1RA	1:28.686	1:28.689	10	
11	54	(United Kingdom) James Nash	SEAT León TCR	(Hong Kong) Lukoil Craft-Bamboo Racing	1:28.883	1:28.752	11	
12	6	(Belgium) Frédéric Vervisch	Audi RS3 LMS TCR	(Belgium) Comtoyou Racing	1:28.796	1:28.794	12	
13	30	(Italy) Gabriele Tarquini	Hyundai i30 N TCR	(Italy) BRC Racing Team	1:28.403		21^{1} ^{2}	
14	33	(Switzerland) Alain Menu	Hyundai i30 N TCR	(Italy) BRC Racing Team	1:28.431		13^{1}	
15	95	(United Kingdom) Josh Files	Honda Civic Type-R TCR	(Hungary) M1RA	1:28.991		14	
16	62	(Serbia) Dušan Borković	Alfa Romeo Giulietta TCR	(Georgia (country)) GE-Force	1:29.067		15	
17	70	(Slovakia) Maťo Homola	Opel Astra TCR	(Belgium) DG Sport Compétition	1:29.253		16	
18	5	(Italy) Roberto Colciago	Honda Civic Type-R TCR	(Hungary) M1RA	1:29.319		17	
19	28	(France) Aurélien Panis	Honda Civic Type-R TCR	(Belgium) Boutsen Ginion Racing	1:29.461		18	
20	16	(Georgia (country)) Davit Kajaia	Alfa Romeo Giulietta TCR	(Georgia (country)) GE-Force	1:29.965		19	
21	18	(United States) Duncan Ende	SEAT León TCR	(United States) Icarus Motorsports	1:30.296		20	

Notes

- ^1 — Gabriele Tarquini and Alain Menu, who had qualified second and fourth in Q1. Was not allowed to take part in Q2, because their Hyundai i30 N TCRs were running on a temporary homologation, which means that they are not eligible for points.
- ^2 — Gabriele Tarquini was sent to the back of the grid for Race 1, after an engine change.

=== Race 1 ===
Pos.	No.	Driver	Car	Team	Laps	Time/Retired	Grid	Points
1	74	(Spain) Pepe Oriola	SEAT León TCR	(Hong Kong) Lukoil Craft-Bamboo Racing	19	30:57.563	4	25
2	3	(United Kingdom) Gordon Shedden	Volkswagen Golf GTI TCR	(Luxembourg) Leopard Racing Team WRT	19	+4.445	1	18
3	2	(France) Jean-Karl Vernay	Volkswagen Golf GTI TCR	(Luxembourg) Leopard Racing Team WRT	17	+6.410	2	15
4	54	(United Kingdom) James Nash	SEAT León TCR	(Hong Kong) Lukoil Craft-Bamboo Racing	19	+7.451	11	12
5	9	(Hungary) Attila Tassi	Honda Civic Type-R TCR	(Hungary) M1RA	19	+7.632	10	10
6	95	(United Kingdom) Josh Files	Honda Civic Type-R TCR	(Hungary) M1RA	19	+8.024	14	8
7	1	(Switzerland) Stefano Comini	Audi RS3 LMS TCR	(Belgium) Comtoyou Racing	19	+11.326	9	6
8	62	(Serbia) Dušan Borković	Alfa Romeo Giulietta TCR	(Georgia (country)) GE-Force	19	+14.194	15	4
9	16	(Georgia (country)) Davit Kajaia	Alfa Romeo Giulietta TCR	(Georgia (country)) GE-Force	19	+15.287	19	2
10	18	(United States) Duncan Ende	SEAT León TCR	(United States) Icarus Motorsports	19	+17.323	20	1
11	6	(Belgium) Frédéric Vervisch	Audi RS3 LMS TCR	(Belgium) Comtoyou Racing	19	+31.859	12	
12	70	(Slovakia) Maťo Homola	Opel Astra TCR	(Belgium) DG Sport Compétition	19	+43.319^{3}	16	
13	13	(Germany) Benjamin Leuchter	Volkswagen Golf GTI TCR	(Sweden) WestCoast Racing	19	+1:28.514	3	
14	28	(France) Aurélien Panis	Honda Civic Type-R TCR	(Belgium) Boutsen Ginion Racing	18	+1 lap	18	
15	30	(Italy) Gabriele Tarquini	Hyundai i30 N TCR	(Italy) BRC Racing Team	18	+1 lap	21	
16	10	(Italy) Gianni Morbidelli	Volkswagen Golf GTI TCR	(Sweden) WestCoast Racing	16	+3 laps	5	
Ret	4	(Belgium) Denis Dupont	SEAT León TCR	(Belgium) Comtoyou Racing	11	Puncture	6	
Ret	5	(Italy) Roberto Colciago	Honda Civic Type-R TCR	(Hungary) M1RA	5	Collision	17	
Ret	17	(United Kingdom) Daniel Lloyd	SEAT León TCR	(Hong Kong) Lukoil Craft-Bamboo Racing	4	Collision	8	
Ret	27	(France) Aurélien Comte	Opel Astra TCR	(Belgium) DG Sport Compétition	3	Technical	7	
Ret	33	(Switzerland) Alain Menu	Hyundai i30 N TCR	(Italy) BRC Racing Team	2	Collision	13	

Notes

- ^3 — Maťo Homola was given a post race 30 second time penalty for causing a collision and rejoining the track unsafely during the race.

=== Race 2 ===
Pos.	No.	Driver	Car	Team	Laps	Time/Retired	Grid	Points
1	1	(Switzerland) Stefano Comini	Audi RS3 LMS TCR	(Belgium) Comtoyou Racing	17	25:37.323	2	25
2	10	(Italy) Gianni Morbidelli	Volkswagen Golf GTI TCR	(Sweden) WestCoast Racing	17	+1.190	5	18
3	95	(United Kingdom) Josh Files	Honda Civic Type-R TCR	(Hungary) M1RA	17	+5.008	13	15
4	6	(Belgium) Frédéric Vervisch	Audi RS3 LMS TCR	(Belgium) Comtoyou Racing	17	+6.815	11	12
5	33	(Switzerland) Alain Menu	Hyundai i30 N TCR	(Italy) BRC Racing Team	17	+9.232	20^{4}	
6	13	(Germany) Benjamin Leuchter	Volkswagen Golf GTI TCR	(Sweden) WestCoast Racing	17	+9.4483	7	10
7	3	(United Kingdom) Gordon Shedden	Volkswagen Golf GTI TCR	(Luxembourg) Leopard Racing Team WRT	17	+11.453	9	8
8	62	(Serbia) Dušan Borković	Alfa Romeo Giulietta TCR	(Georgia (country)) GE-Force	17	+15.440	14	6
9	30	(Italy) Gabriele Tarquini	Hyundai i30 N TCR	(Italy) BRC Racing Team	17	+17.117	12	
10	16	(Georgia (country)) Davit Kajaia	Alfa Romeo Giulietta TCR	(Georgia (country)) GE-Force	17	+21.421	18	4
11	54	(United Kingdom) James Nash	SEAT León TCR	(Hong Kong) Lukoil Craft-Bamboo Racing	17	+23.272	10	2
12	9	(Hungary) Attila Tassi	Honda Civic Type-R TCR	(Hungary) M1RA	17	+23.385	1	1
13	28	(France) Aurélien Panis	Honda Civic Type-R TCR	(Belgium) Boutsen Ginion Racing	17	+23.542	17	
14	18	(United States) Duncan Ende	SEAT León TCR	(United States) Icarus Motorsports	17	+24.355	19	
15	2	(France) Jean-Karl Vernay	Volkswagen Golf GTI TCR	(Luxembourg) Leopard Racing Team WRT	15	Puncture	8	
16	27	(France) Aurélien Comte	Opel Astra TCR	(Belgium) DG Sport Compétition	15	Technical	21^{4}	
17	4	(Belgium) Denis Dupont	SEAT León TCR	(Belgium) Comtoyou Racing	13	Puncture	4	
Ret	70	(Slovakia) Maťo Homola	Opel Astra TCR	(Belgium) DG Sport Compétition	3	Technical	15	
Ret	74	(Spain) Pepe Oriola	SEAT León TCR	(Hong Kong) Lukoil Craft-Bamboo Racing	1	Collision	6	
DNS	5	(Italy) Roberto Colciago	Honda Civic Type-R TCR	(Hungary) M1RA		Collision	16	
DNS	17	(United Kingdom) Daniel Lloyd	SEAT León TCR	(Hong Kong) Lukoil Craft-Bamboo Racing		Collision	3	

Notes

- ^4 — Alain Menu and Aurélien Comte was sent to the back of the grid for Race 2, after having broken the parc fermé regulations following Race 1.

== Standings after the event ==
Drivers' Championship standings

	Pos	Driver	Points
	1	(France) Jean-Karl Vernay	226
	2	(Hungary) Attila Tassi	197
	3	(Switzerland) Stefano Comini	196
1	4	(Spain) Pepe Oriola	164
1	5	(Italy) Roberto Colciago	161

Model of the Year standings

	Pos	Car	Points
1	1	Volkswagen Golf GTI TCR	520
1	2	Honda Civic Type-R TCR	515
	3	SEAT León TCR	435
	4	Audi RS3 LMS TCR	320
	5	Alfa Romeo Giulietta TCR	214

Teams' Championship standings

	Pos	Driver	Points
	1	(Hungary) M1RA	439
	2	(Hong Kong) Lukoil Craft-Bamboo Racing	377
	3	(Luxembourg) Leopard Racing Team WRT	375
	4	(Belgium) Comtoyou Racing	289
1	5	(Sweden) WestCoast Racing	201

- Note: Only the top five positions are included for both sets of drivers' standings.
