= 2015 TCR International Series Sepang round =

(Malaysia) 2015 TCR International Series Sepang round
Round details
- Round 1 of 11 rounds in the 2015 TCR International Series
- Layout of the Sepang International Circuit
- Location: Sepang International Circuit, Kuala Lumpur, Malaysia
- Course: Permanent racing facility 5.543 km (3.445 mi)

TCR International Series

Race 1
- Date: 28 March 2015
- Laps: 9

Pole position
Driver	(United States) Kevin Gleason	WestCoast Racing
- Time: 2:19.717

Podium
First	(Switzerland) Stefano Comini	Target Competition
Second	(Spain) Pepe Oriola	Team Craft-Bamboo Lukoil
Third	(Russia) Sergey Afanasyev	Team Craft-Bamboo Lukoil

Fastest lap
Driver	(Switzerland) Stefano Comini	Target Competition
- Time: 2:20.585 (on lap 3)

Race 2
- Date: 29 March 2015
- Laps: 10

Podium
First	(Spain) Jordi Gené	Team Craft-Bamboo Lukoil
Second	(Spain) Pepe Oriola	Team Craft-Bamboo Lukoil
Third	(Italy) Gianni Morbidelli	WestCoast Racing

Fastest lap
Driver	(Italy) Andrea Belicchi	Target Competition
- Time: 2:21.336 (on lap 3)

The 2015 TCR International Series Sepang round was the first round of the 2015 TCR International Series season. It took place on 28–29 March at the Sepang International Circuit.

It was the first round ever for the TCR International Series. Stefano Comini won the first race, starting from third position, and Jordi Gené gained the second one, both driving a SEAT León Cup Racer.

== Classification ==
=== Qualifying ===
Pos.	No.	Driver	Car	Team	Q1	Q2	Grid	Points
1	24	(United States) Kevin Gleason	Honda Civic Type R TCR (FK2)	(Sweden) WestCoast Racing	2:21.567	2:19:717	1	5
2	33	(Italy) Andrea Belicchi	SEAT León Cup Racer	(Italy) Target Competition	2:20.778	2:19.738	2	4
3	25	(Switzerland) Stefano Comini	SEAT León Cup Racer	(Italy) Target Competition	2:21.222	2:19.878	3	3
4	6	(Germany) Franz Engstler	Audi TT Cup	(Germany) Liqui Moly Team Engstler	2:21.239	2:19.980	4	2
5	23	(Germany) René Münnich	Honda Civic Type R TCR (FK2)	(Sweden) WestCoast Racing	2:21.624	2:20.004	5	1
6	10	(Italy) Gianni Morbidelli	Honda Civic Type R TCR (FK2)	(Sweden) WestCoast Racing	2:21.062	2:20.132	6	
7	77	(Russia) Sergey Afanasyev	SEAT León Cup Racer	(United Kingdom) Team Craft-Bamboo Lukoil	2:21.122	2:20.133	7	
8	74	(Spain) Pepe Oriola	SEAT León Cup Racer	(United Kingdom) Team Craft-Bamboo Lukoil	2:21.325	2:20.429	8	
9	55	(Hungary) Ferenc Ficza	SEAT León Cup Racer	(Hungary) Zengő Motorsport	2:20.888	2:20.502	9	
10	88	(Spain) Jordi Gené	SEAT León Cup Racer	(United Kingdom) Team Craft-Bamboo Lukoil	2:21.164	2:20.530	10	
11	8	(Russia) Mikhail Grachev	Audi TT Cup	(Germany) Liqui Moly Team Engstler	2:21.389	2:20.576	11	
12	17	(Denmark) Michel Nykjær	SEAT León Cup Racer	(Italy) Target Competition	2:21.606	no time	12	
13	7	(Italy) Lorenzo Veglia	SEAT León Cup Racer	(Germany) Liqui Moly Team Engstler	2:23.045		13	
14	20	(Ukraine) Igor Skuz	Opel Astra OPC	(Spain) Campos Racing	2:39.646		14^{1}	
15	99	(Hong Kong) Frank Yu	SEAT León Cup Racer	(Hong Kong) Craft-Bamboo Racing	2:47.309		15^{1}	
16	21	(Spain) Jordi Oriola	Opel Astra OPC	(Spain) Campos Racing	no time		16^{1}	
17	72	(Italy) Diego Romanini	Ford Focus ST	(Italy) Proteam Racing	no time		17^{1}	

Notes

- ^1 — Igor Skuz, Frank Yu, Jordi Oriola and Diego Romanini were moved to the back of the grid for having not set a time within the 107% limit.

=== Race 1 ===
Pos.	No.	Driver	Car	Team	Laps	Time/Retired	Grid	Points
1	25	(Switzerland) Stefano Comini	SEAT León Cup Racer	(Italy) Target Competition	9	21:26.159	3	25
2	74	(Spain) Pepe Oriola	SEAT León Cup Racer	(United Kingdom) Team Craft-Bamboo Lukoil	9	+3.381	8	18
3	77	(Russia) Sergey Afanasyev	SEAT León Cup Racer	(United Kingdom) Team Craft-Bamboo Lukoil	9	+8.095	7	15
4	10	(Italy) Gianni Morbidelli	Honda Civic Type R TCR (FK2)	(Sweden) WestCoast Racing	9	+9.002	6	12
5	33	(Italy) Andrea Belicchi	SEAT León Cup Racer	(Italy) Target Competition	9	+9.708	2	10
6	24	(United States) Kevin Gleason	Honda Civic Type R TCR (FK2)	(Sweden) WestCoast Racing	9	+11.428	1	8
7	88	(Spain) Jordi Gené	SEAT León Cup Racer	(United Kingdom) Team Craft-Bamboo Lukoil	9	+12.494	10	6
8	17	(Denmark) Michel Nykjær	SEAT León Cup Racer	(Italy) Target Competition	9	+16.215	12	4
9	55	(Hungary) Ferenc Ficza	SEAT León Cup Racer	(Hungary) Zengõ Motorsport	9	+21.148	9	2
10	7	(Italy) Lorenzo Veglia	SEAT León Cup Racer	(Germany) Liqui Moly Team Engstler	9	+25.651	13	1
11	99	(Hong Kong) Frank Yu	SEAT León Cup Racer	(Hong Kong) Craft-Bamboo Racing	9	+1:08.472	15	
Ret	23	(Germany) René Münnich	Honda Civic Type R TCR (FK2)	(Sweden) WestCoast Racing	7	Fuel pump	5	
Ret	8	(Russia) Mikhail Grachev	Audi TT Cup	(Germany) Liqui Moly Team Engstler	3	Engine	11	
Ret	6	(Germany) Franz Engstler	Audi TT Cup	(Germany) Liqui Moly Team Engstler	0	Collision	4	
DNS	20	(Ukraine) Igor Skuz	Opel Astra OPC	(Spain) Campos Racing		Overheating	14	
DNS	21	(Spain) Jordi Oriola	Opel Astra OPC	(Spain) Campos Racing		Overheating	16	
DNS	72	(Italy) Diego Romanini	Ford Focus ST	(Italy) Proteam Racing		Electrical	17	

=== Race 2 ===
Pos.	No.	Driver	Car	Team	Laps	Time/Retired	Grid	Points
1	88	(Spain) Jordi Gené	SEAT León Cup Racer	(United Kingdom) Team Craft-Bamboo Lukoil	10	23:53.256	1	25
2	74	(Spain) Pepe Oriola	SEAT León Cup Racer	(United Kingdom) Team Craft-Bamboo Lukoil	10	+0.752	3	18
3	10	(Italy) Gianni Morbidelli	Honda Civic Type R TCR (FK2)	(Sweden) WestCoast Racing	10	+2.366	5	15
4	25	(Switzerland) Stefano Comini	SEAT León Cup Racer	(Italy) Target Competition	10	+2.594	8	12
5	33	(Italy) Andrea Belicchi	SEAT León Cup Racer	(Italy) Target Competition	10	+3.570	9	10
6	23	(Germany) René Münnich	Honda Civic Type R TCR (FK2)	(Sweden) WestCoast Racing	10	+9.603	6	8
7	24	(United States) Kevin Gleason	Honda Civic Type R TCR (FK2)	(Sweden) WestCoast Racing	10	+10.859	10	6
8	8	(Russia) Mikhail Grachev	Audi TT Cup	(Germany) Liqui Moly Team Engstler	10	+12.067	11	4
9	99	(Hong Kong) Frank Yu	SEAT León Cup Racer	(Hong Kong) Craft-Bamboo Racing	10	+33.560	15	2
10	55	(Hungary) Ferenc Ficza	SEAT León Cup Racer	(Hungary) Zengő Motorsport	9	Technical	2	1
11	7	(Italy) Lorenzo Veglia	SEAT León Cup Racer	(Germany) Liqui Moly Team Engstler	9	+1 lap	13	
Ret	6	(Germany) Franz Engstler	Audi TT Cup	(Germany) Liqui Moly Team Engstler	6	Technical	7	
Ret	20	(Ukraine) Igor Skuz	Opel Astra OPC	(Spain) Campos Racing	6	Technical	14	
Ret	77	(Russia) Sergey Afanasyev	SEAT León Cup Racer	(United Kingdom) Team Craft-Bamboo Lukoil	1	Collision	4	
Ret	17	(Denmark) Michel Nykjær	SEAT León Cup Racer	(Italy) Target Competition	0	Collision	12	
DNS	21	(Spain) Jordi Oriola	Opel Astra OPC	(Spain) Campos Racing		Overheating	16	
DNS	72	(Italy) Diego Romanini	Ford Focus ST	(Italy) Proteam Racing		Electrical	17	

== Standings after the event ==
Drivers' Championship standings

Pos	Driver	Points
1	(Switzerland) Stefano Comini	40
2	(Spain) Pepe Oriola	36
3	(Spain) Jordi Gené	31
4	(Italy) Gianni Morbidelli	27
5	(Italy) Andrea Belicchi	24

Teams' Championship standings

Pos	Driver	Points
1	(United Kingdom) Team Craft-Bamboo Lukoil	76
2	(Italy) Target Competition	64
3	(Sweden) WestCoast Racing	49
4	(Germany) Liqui Moly Team Engstler	14
5	(Hungary) Zengő Motorsport	10

- Note: Only the top five positions are included for both sets of drivers' standings.
