= 2017 TCR International Series Oschersleben round =

(Germany) 2017 TCR International Series Oschersleben round
Round details
- Round 7 of 10 rounds in the 2017 TCR International Series
- Layout of the Motorsport Arena Oschersleben
- Location: Motorsport Arena Oschersleben, Oschersleben, Germany
- Course: Permanent racing facility 3.667 km (2.292 mi)

TCR International Series

Race 1
- Date: 9 July 2017
- Laps: 19

Pole position
| Driver | (Italy) Gianni Morbidelli | WestCoast Racing |
- Time: 1:31.426

Podium
| First | (Italy) Gianni Morbidelli | WestCoast Racing |
| Second | (United Kingdom) Daniel Lloyd | Lukoil Craft-Bamboo Racing |
| Third | (United Kingdom) Robert Huff | Leopard Racing Team WRT |

Fastest lap
| Driver | (Italy) Gianni Morbidelli | WestCoast Racing |
- Time: 1:32.610 (on lap 9)

Race 2
- Date: 9 July 2017
- Laps: 15

Podium
| First | (Italy) Gianni Morbidelli | WestCoast Racing |
| Second | (Slovakia) Maťo Homola | DG Sport Compétition |
| Third | (France) Jean-Karl Vernay | Leopard Racing Team WRT |

Fastest lap
| Driver | (Italy) Gianni Morbidelli | WestCoast Racing |
- Time: 1:32.496 (on lap 5)

The 2017 TCR International Series Oschersleben round was the seventh round of the 2017 TCR International Series season. It took place on 9 July at the Motorsport Arena Oschersleben.

Gianni Morbidelli won both races starting from pole position in Race 1 and tenth position in Race 2, driving a Volkswagen Golf GTI TCR.

== Ballast ==
Due to the results obtained in the previous round, Attila Tassi received +30 kg, Norbert Michelisz +20 kg and Pepe Oriola +10 kg. Nevertheless, Michelisz didn't take part at this event, so he didn't take the ballast.

The Balance of Performance was also adjusted for this event, meaning the Alfa Romeo Giulietta TCRs, Audi RS3 LMS TCRs, Kia Cee'd TCRs, Subaru WRX STi TCRs, Peugeot 308 Racing Cup TCRs, Volkswagen Golf GTI TCRs and SEAT León TCRs was all given a -20 kg weight break, while the Honda Civic Type-R TCRs, Opel Astra TCRs and SEAT León TCR DSG's was given a -10 kg weight break. With the DSG equipped Audi RS3 LMS TCRs and SEAT León TCRs had their ride height reduced to 60mm.

== Classification ==
=== Qualifying ===
| Pos. | No. | Driver | Car | Team | Q1 | Q2 | Grid | Points |
|---|---|---|---|---|---|---|---|---|
| 1 | 10 | (Italy) Gianni Morbidelli | Volkswagen Golf GTI TCR | (Sweden) WestCoast Racing | 1:31.421 | 1:31.426 | 1 | 5 |
| 2 | 14 | (Netherlands) Jaap van Lagen | Volkswagen Golf GTI TCR | (Luxembourg) Leopard Racing Team WRT | 1:31.553 | 1:31.669 | 2 | 4 |
| 3 | 17 | (United Kingdom) Daniel Lloyd | SEAT León TCR | (Hong Kong) Lukoil Craft-Bamboo Racing | 1:32.228 | 1:31.714 | 3 | 3 |
| 4 | 3 | (United Kingdom) Robert Huff | Volkswagen Golf GTI TCR | (Luxembourg) Leopard Racing Team WRT | 1:32.561 | 1:31.821 | 4 | 2 |
| 5 | 74 | (Spain) Pepe Oriola | SEAT León TCR | (Hong Kong) Lukoil Craft-Bamboo Racing | 1:32.069 | 1:31.834 | 5 | 1 |
| 6 | 21 | (Italy) Giacomo Altoè | Volkswagen Golf GTI TCR | (Sweden) WestCoast Racing | 1:32.304 | 1:31.883 | 6 | |
| 7 | 54 | (United Kingdom) James Nash | SEAT León TCR | (Hong Kong) Lukoil Craft-Bamboo Racing | 1:32.307 | 1:31.954 | 7 | |
| 8 | 5 | (Italy) Roberto Colciago | Honda Civic Type-R TCR | (Hungary) M1RA | 1:32.468 | 1:32.140 | 8 | |
| 9 | 2 | (France) Jean-Karl Vernay | Volkswagen Golf GTI TCR | (Luxembourg) Leopard Racing Team WRT | 1:32.252 | 1:32.146 | 9 | |
| 10 | 70 | (Slovakia) Maťo Homola | Opel Astra TCR | (Belgium) DG Sport Compétition | 1:32.322 | 1:32.191 | 10 | |
| 11 | 8 | (Germany) Luca Engstler | Volkswagen Golf GTI TCR | (Germany) Junior Team Engstler | 1:32.024 | 1:32.195 | 11 | |
| 12 | 34 | (Norway) Stian Paulsen | SEAT León TCR | (Norway) Stian Paulsen Racing | 1:32.651 | 1:32.773 | 12 | |
| 13 | 9 | (Hungary) Attila Tassi | Honda Civic Type-R TCR | (Hungary) M1RA | 1:32.722 | | 13 | |
| 14 | 62 | (Serbia) Dušan Borković | Alfa Romeo Giulietta TCR | (Georgia (country)) GE-Force | 1:32.834 | | 14 | |
| 15 | 16 | (Georgia (country)) Davit Kajaia | Alfa Romeo Giulietta TCR | (Georgia (country)) GE-Force | 1:33.104 | | 15 | |
| 16 | 6 | (Belgium) Frédéric Vervisch | Audi RS3 LMS TCR | (Belgium) Comtoyou Racing | 1:33.207 | | 23^{1} | |
| 17 | 28 | (France) Aurélien Panis | Honda Civic Type-R TCR | (Belgium) Boutsen Ginion Racing | 1:33.328 | | 16 | |
| 18 | 1 | (Switzerland) Stefano Comini | Audi RS3 LMS TCR | (Belgium) Comtoyou Racing | 1:33.397 | | 17 | |
| 19 | 55 | (Hungary) Ferenc Ficza | Kia Cee'd TCR | (Hungary) Zengő Motorsport | 1:33.584 | | 18 | |
| 20 | 38 | (Netherlands) Danny Kroes | SEAT León TCR | (Netherlands) Ferry Monster Autosport | 1:33.704 | | 19 | |
| 21 | 11 | (Denmark) Jens Reno Møller | Honda Civic Type-R TCR | (Denmark) Reno Racing | 1:34.114 | | 20 | |
| 22 | 66 | (France) Grégoire Demoustier | Opel Astra TCR | (Belgium) DG Sport Compétition | 1:34.164 | | 21 | |
| 23 | 18 | (United States) Duncan Ende | SEAT León TCR | (United States) Icarus Motorsports | 1:34.605 | | 22 | |
| 24 | 31 | (Serbia) Milovan Vesnić | Audi RS3 LMS TCR | (Serbia) ASK Vesnić | No time | | | |

Notes

- ^1 — Frédéric Vervisch was sent to the back of the grid for Race 1, after an engine change.

=== Race 1 ===
| Pos. | No. | Driver | Car | Team | Laps | Time/Retired | Grid | Points |
|---|---|---|---|---|---|---|---|---|
| 1 | 10 | (Italy) Gianni Morbidelli | Volkswagen Golf GTI TCR | (Sweden) WestCoast Racing | 19 | 31:28.263 | 1 | 25 |
| 2 | 17 | (United Kingdom) Daniel Lloyd | SEAT León TCR | (Hong Kong) Lukoil Craft-Bamboo Racing | 19 | +2.314 | 3 | 18 |
| 3 | 3 | (United Kingdom) Robert Huff | Volkswagen Golf GTI TCR | (Luxembourg) Leopard Racing Team WRT | 19 | +5.890 | 4 | 15 |
| 4 | 54 | (United Kingdom) James Nash | SEAT León TCR | (Hong Kong) Lukoil Craft-Bamboo Racing | 19 | +6.454 | 7 | 12 |
| 5 | 21 | (Italy) Giacomo Altoè | Volkswagen Golf GTI TCR | (Sweden) WestCoast Racing | 19 | +9.938 | 6 | 10 |
| 6 | 1 | (Switzerland) Stefano Comini | Audi RS3 LMS TCR | (Belgium) Comtoyou Racing | 19 | +16.300 | 17 | 8 |
| 7 | 70 | (Slovakia) Maťo Homola | Opel Astra TCR | (Belgium) DG Sport Compétition | 19 | +16.794 | 10 | 6 |
| 8 | 14 | (Netherlands) Jaap van Lagen | Volkswagen Golf GTI TCR | (Luxembourg) Leopard Racing Team WRT | 19 | +16.992 | 2 | 4 |
| 9 | 38 | (Netherlands) Danny Kroes | SEAT León TCR | (Netherlands) Ferry Monster Autosport | 19 | +23.892 | 19 | 2 |
| 10 | 6 | (Belgium) Frédéric Vervisch | Audi RS3 LMS TCR | (Belgium) Comtoyou Racing | 19 | +27.858 | 23 | 1 |
| 11 | 66 | (France) Grégoire Demoustier | Opel Astra TCR | (Belgium) DG Sport Compétition | 19 | +30.258 | 21 | |
| 12 | 55 | (Hungary) Ferenc Ficza | Kia Cee'd TCR | (Hungary) Zengő Motorsport | 19 | +30.805 | 18 | |
| 13 | 18 | (United States) Duncan Ende | SEAT León TCR | (United States) Icarus Motorsports | 19 | +36.622 | 22 | |
| 14 | 5 | (Italy) Roberto Colciago | Honda Civic Type-R TCR | (Hungary) M1RA | 19 | +37.614 | 8 | |
| 15 | 28 | (France) Aurélien Panis | Honda Civic Type-R TCR | (Belgium) Boutsen Ginion Racing | 18 | +1 lap | 16 | |
| 16 | 16 | (Georgia (country)) Davit Kajaia | Alfa Romeo Giulietta TCR | (Georgia (country)) GE-Force | 18 | +1 lap | 15 | |
| 17 | 34 | (Norway) Stian Paulsen | SEAT León TCR | (Norway) Stian Paulsen Racing | 17 | +2 laps | 12 | |
| 18 | 11 | (Denmark) Jens Reno Møller | Honda Civic Type-R TCR | (Denmark) Reno Racing | 17 | +2 laps | 20 | |
| 19 | 74 | (Spain) Pepe Oriola | SEAT León TCR | (Hong Kong) Lukoil Craft-Bamboo Racing | 15 | +4 laps | 5 | |
| Ret | 62 | (Serbia) Dušan Borković | Alfa Romeo Giulietta TCR | (Georgia (country)) GE-Force | 11 | Radiator | 14 | |
| Ret | 2 | (France) Jean-Karl Vernay | Volkswagen Golf GTI TCR | (Luxembourg) Leopard Racing Team WRT | 9 | Collision | 9 | |
| Ret | 8 | (Germany) Luca Engstler | Volkswagen Golf GTI TCR | (Germany) Junior Team Engstler | 4 | Technical | 11 | |
| Ret | 9 | (Hungary) Attila Tassi | Honda Civic Type-R TCR | (Hungary) M1RA | 4 | Collision | 13 | |
| WD | 31 | (Serbia) Milovan Vesnić | Audi RS3 LMS TCR | (Serbia) ASK Vesnić | | Withdrew | | |

=== Race 2 ===
| Pos. | No. | Driver | Car | Team | Laps | Time/Retired | Grid | Points |
|---|---|---|---|---|---|---|---|---|
| 1 | 10 | (Italy) Gianni Morbidelli | Volkswagen Golf GTI TCR | (Sweden) WestCoast Racing | 15 | 23:29.470 | 10 | 25 |
| 2 | 70 | (Slovakia) Maťo Homola | Opel Astra TCR | (Belgium) DG Sport Compétition | 15 | +0.434 | 1 | 18 |
| 3 | 2 | (France) Jean-Karl Vernay | Volkswagen Golf GTI TCR | (Luxembourg) Leopard Racing Team WRT | 15 | +0.716 | 2 | 15 |
| 4 | 17 | (United Kingdom) Daniel Lloyd | SEAT León TCR | (Hong Kong) Lukoil Craft-Bamboo Racing | 15 | +0.908 | 8 | 12 |
| 5 | 1 | (Switzerland) Stefano Comini | Audi RS3 LMS TCR | (Belgium) Comtoyou Racing | 15 | +16.127 | 18 | 10 |
| 6 | 6 | (Belgium) Frédéric Vervisch | Audi RS3 LMS TCR | (Belgium) Comtoyou Racing | 15 | +27.291 | 16 | 8 |
| 7 | 18 | (United States) Duncan Ende | SEAT León TCR | (United States) Icarus Motorsports | 15 | +31.037 | 23 | 6 |
| 8 | 11 | (Denmark) Jens Reno Møller | Honda Civic Type-R TCR | (Denmark) Reno Racing | 15 | +1:06.803 | 21 | 4 |
| 9 | 16 | (Georgia (country)) Davit Kajaia | Alfa Romeo Giulietta TCR | (Georgia (country)) GE-Force | 13 | +2 laps | 15 | 2 |
| 10 | 55 | (Hungary) Ferenc Ficza | Kia Cee'd TCR | (Hungary) Zengő Motorsport | 13 | +2 laps | 19 | 1 |
| 11 | 9 | (Hungary) Attila Tassi | Honda Civic Type-R TCR | (Hungary) M1RA | 12 | +3 laps | 13 | |
| 12 | 66 | (France) Grégoire Demoustier | Opel Astra TCR | (Belgium) DG Sport Compétition | 12 | +3 laps | 22 | |
| Ret | 38 | (Netherlands) Danny Kroes | SEAT León TCR | (Netherlands) Ferry Monster Autosport | 7 | Accident | 20 | |
| Ret | 62 | (Serbia) Dušan Borković | Alfa Romeo Giulietta TCR | (Georgia (country)) GE-Force | 3 | Power Steering | 14 | |
| Ret | 14 | (Netherlands) Jaap van Lagen | Volkswagen Golf GTI TCR | (Luxembourg) Leopard Racing Team WRT | 1 | Suspension | 9 | |
| Ret | 74 | (Spain) Pepe Oriola | SEAT León TCR | (Hong Kong) Lukoil Craft-Bamboo Racing | 0 | Accident | 6 | |
| Ret | 8 | (Germany) Luca Engstler | Volkswagen Golf GTI TCR | (Germany) Junior Team Engstler | 0 | Accident | 11 | |
| Ret | 5 | (Italy) Roberto Colciago | Honda Civic Type-R TCR | (Hungary) M1RA | 0 | Accident | 3 | |
| Ret | 54 | (United Kingdom) James Nash | SEAT León TCR | (Hong Kong) Lukoil Craft-Bamboo Racing | 0 | Accident | 4 | |
| Ret | 21 | (Italy) Giacomo Altoè | Volkswagen Golf GTI TCR | (Sweden) WestCoast Racing | 0 | Accident | 5 | |
| Ret | 3 | (United Kingdom) Robert Huff | Volkswagen Golf GTI TCR | (Luxembourg) Leopard Racing Team WRT | 0 | Accident | 7 | |
| Ret | 34 | (Norway) Stian Paulsen | SEAT León TCR | (Norway) Stian Paulsen Racing | 0 | Accident | 12 | |
| DNS | 28 | (France) Aurélien Panis | Honda Civic Type-R TCR | (Belgium) Boutsen Ginion Racing | | Engine | 17 | |
| WD | 31 | (Serbia) Milovan Vesnić | Audi RS3 LMS TCR | (Serbia) ASK Vesnić | | Withdrew | | |

== Standings after the event ==
Drivers' Championship standings

| | Pos | Driver | Points |
|---|---|---|---|
| 3 | 1 | (France) Jean-Karl Vernay | 153 |
| 1 | 2 | (Hungary) Attila Tassi | 151 |
| 1 | 3 | (Italy) Roberto Colciago | 145 |
| | 4 | (Switzerland) Stefano Comini | 144 |
| | 5 | (Spain) Pepe Oriola | 110 |

Model of the Year standings

| Pos | Car | Points |
|---|---|---|
| 1 | Honda Civic Type-R TCR | 364 |
| 2 | SEAT León TCR | 316 |
| 3 | Volkswagen Golf GTI TCR | 313 |
| 4 | Audi RS3 LMS TCR | 228 |
| 5 | Alfa Romeo Giulietta TCR | 155 |

Teams' Championship standings

| Pos | Driver | Points |
|---|---|---|
| 1 | (Hungary) M1RA | 308 |
| 2 | (Hong Kong) Lukoil Craft-Bamboo Racing | 275 |
| 3 | (Belgium) Comtoyou Racing | 212 |
| 4 | (Luxembourg) Leopard Racing Team WRT | 209 |
| 5 | (Georgia (country)) GE-Force | 145 |

- Note: Only the top five positions are included for both sets of drivers' standings.
