= LP Winner Motorsport =

Hungarian auto racing team

(Hungary) LP Winner Motorsport
- Founded: 2011
- Team principal(s): Levente Kazinczky
- Current series: TCR International Series; Champions
- Noted drivers: TCR; 26. (Hungary) István Bernula; TCR Germany; 77. (Hungary) Balázs Fekete; 90. (Hungary) István Bernula
- Website: http://lpwinner.hu

LP Winner Motorsport is a Hungarian auto racing team based in Budapest, Hungary. The team was founded as and still races under the Botka Rally Team banner. The team competes in both track racing and rallying. The team has raced in the TCR International Series, since 2017. The team also takes part in multiple rallies and races in the Champions.

== ADAC TCR Germany Touring Car Championship ==
The team was announced as a part of the 44 car grid for the 2017 ADAC TCR Germany Touring Car Championship, where they will enter two Kia Cee'd TCRs for Balázs Fekete and István Bernula.

== TCR International Series ==
=== Kia Cee'd TCR (2017–) ===
After having rallied for many seasons, the team entered the 2017 TCR International Series with István Bernula driving a Kia Cee'd TCR. Bernula qualified 20th and did not start Race 1 due to a technical problem, before finishing 16th in Race 2.
