= István Bernula =

Hungarian racing driver

- Nationality: Hungarian
- Born: 18 June 1978 (age 48) Budapest, Hungary

TCR International Series career
- Debut season: 2017
- Current team: Botka Rally Team
- Car number: 26
- Starts: 1

Previous series
- 2017 2016 2015-16 2014-16: Champions; Lotus Cup Europe; Suzuki Swift Cup Hungary; Suzuki Swift Cup Europe

Championship titles
- 2015 2015: Suzuki Swift Cup Hungary; Suzuki Swift Cup Europe

István Bertold Bernula (born 18 June 1978) is a Hungarian racing driver currently competing in the TCR International Series and Champions. Having previously competed in the Lotus Cup Europe and Suzuki Swift Cup Europe amongst others.

== Racing career ==
Bernula began his career in 2014 in the European Suzuki Swift Cup, taking one victory and six podiums during his maiden season, he ended the season second in the championship standings. In 2015 he continued in the series, while also racing in the Hungarian Suzuki Swift Cup. He won both championships that year. He stayed in both series for 2016, as well as joining the Lotus Cup Europe series. He finished second in Suzuki Swift Cup Europe, third in Suzuki Swift Cup Hungary and ninth in the Lotus Cup Europe. For 2017 he switched to the Champions driving a Kia Cee'd TCR for Botka Rally Team.

In June 2017 it was announced that he would race in the TCR International Series, driving a Kia Cee'd TCR for Botka Rally Team.

== Racing record ==
=== Complete TCR International Series results ===
(key) (Races in bold indicate pole position) (Races in italics indicate fastest lap)

Year	Team	Car	1	2	3	4	5	6	7	8	9	10	11	12	13	14	15	16	17	18	19	20	DC	Points
2017	Botka Rally Team	Kia Cee'd TCR	GEO; 1	GEO; 2	BHR; 1	BHR; 2	BEL; 1	BEL; 2	ITA; 1	ITA; 2	AUT; 1; 16	AUT; 2; 12	HUN; 1 DNS	HUN; 2; 16	GER; 1	GER; 2	THA; 1	THA; 2	CHN; 1	CHN; 2	ABU; 1	ABU; 2	NC*	0*

^{†} Driver did not finish the race, but was classified as he completed over 90% of the race distance.
^{*} Season still in progress.
