= 2020 TCR Eastern Europe Trophy =

2020 European motorsport event

The 2020 TCR Eastern Europe Trophy (also called 2020 TCR Eastern Europe Trophy powered by ESET for sponsorship reasons) was the second season of the TCR Eastern Europe Trophy. The season began on 24 July at the Automotodrom Grobnik and ended on 18 October at the Hungaroring.

Dušan Borković won the championship with 3 races to go.

== Calendar ==
A new calendar was announced on 25 April 2020 with all rounds supporting the ESET V4 Cup.

| Rnd. | | Circuit/Location | Date |
|---|---|---|---|
| 1 | 1 | Automotodrom Grobnik, Rijeka, Croatia | 24–26 July |
| 1 | 2 | Automotodrom Grobnik, Rijeka, Croatia | 24–26 July |
| 2 | 3 | Automotodróm Slovakia Ring, Orechová Potôň, Slovakia | 21–23 August |
| 2 | 4 | Automotodróm Slovakia Ring, Orechová Potôň, Slovakia | 21–23 August |
| 3 | 5 | Automotodrom Brno, Brno, Czech Republic | 4–6 September |
| 3 | 6 | Automotodrom Brno, Brno, Czech Republic | 4–6 September |
| 4 | 7 | Hungaroring, Budapest, Hungary | 24–25 October |
| 4 | 8 | Hungaroring, Budapest, Hungary | 24–25 October |

== Teams and drivers ==
| Team | Car | No. | Drivers | Class | Rounds | Ref. |
|---|---|---|---|---|---|---|
| (Slovakia) ARC Bratislava | Hyundai i30 N TCR | 4 | (Slovakia) Mat'o Konopka | | 1 | |
| (Austria) MSC Rottenegg | Volkswagen Golf GTI TCR | 13 | (Austria) Rene Martinek | | 2–3 | |
| (North Macedonia) LPR Stefanovski Racing Team | Hyundai i30 N TCR | 14 | (North Macedonia) Igor Stefanovski | | 1 | |
| (Czech Republic) GT2 Motorsport | Volkswagen Golf GTI TCR | 21 | (Poland) Szymon Ładniak | J | All | |
| (Czech Republic) GT2 Motorsport | Volkswagen Golf GTI TCR | 24 | (Czech Republic) Jáchym Galáš | J | All | |
| (Czech Republic) Fullín Race Academy | CUPRA León TCR | 22 | (Germany) Carol Wittke | | 1–3 | |
| (Czech Republic) Fullín Race Academy | CUPRA León Competición TCR | 76 | (Czech Republic) Petr Čížek | | 1–3 | |
| (Austria) MAIR Racing Osttirol | Audi RS 3 LMS TCR | 23 | (Austria) Sandro Soubek | | 2–4 | |
| (Serbia) ASK Vesnić | CUPRA León TCR | 31 | (Serbia) Milovan Vesnić | | 1, 3–4 | |
| (Serbia) GM Racing Team | Audi RS 3 LMS TCR | 32 | (Serbia) Rudolf Pešović | | 3 | |
| (Serbia) GM Racing Team | CUPRA León TCR | 365 | (Serbia) Nemanja Milovanović | | 1, 4 | |
| (Czech Republic) Horňák-Aditis | Audi RS 3 LMS TCR | 38 | (Czech Republic) Radim Adámek | | All | |
| (Czech Republic) Mičánek Motorsport | CUPRA León TCR | 44 | (Czech Republic) Michal Makeš | J | All | |
| (Czech Republic) ACCR Czech Talent Team | Hyundai i30 N TCR | 52 | (Czech Republic) Tomáš Korený | J | 4 | |
| (Czech Republic) ACCR Czech Talent Team | Hyundai i30 N TCR | 59 | (Czech Republic) Dušan Kouřil Jr. | J | 1–3 | |
| (Poland) BTC Maszyny Racing | Volkswagen Golf GTI TCR | 53 | (Poland) Łukasz Stolarczyk | | All | |
| (Poland) Wyszomirski Racing | Honda Civic Type R TCR (FK2) | 55 | (Poland) Sebastian Kołakowski | | 1–3 | |
| (Poland) Wyszomirski Racing | Honda Civic Type R TCR (FK2) | 77 | (Poland) Jakub Wyszomirski | | 2–3 | |
| (Hungary) M1RA | Hyundai i30 N TCR | 62 | (Serbia) Dušan Borković | | All | |
| (Poland) BM Racing Team | Hyundai i30 N TCR | 66 | (Poland) Szymon Jabłoński | J | All | |
| (Croatia) Zoran Kotromanović | CUPRA León TCR | 71 | (Croatia) Zoran Kotromanović | | 4 | |
| (Croatia) Auto Klub Dubrovnik Racing | CUPRA León TCR | 74 | (Croatia) Žarko Knego | | 1–2 | |
| (Hungary) Zengő Motorsport | CUPRA León TCR | 555 | (Hungary) Bence Boldizs | | 1–2 | |
| (Hungary) Zengő Motorsport | CUPRA León TCR | 999 | (Hungary) Gábor Kismarty-Lechner | | 1–2 | |

== Results ==
| Rnd. | | Circuit | Pole position | Fastest lap | Winning driver | Winning team |
|---|---|---|---|---|---|---|
| 1 | 1 | Automotodrom Grobnik, Rijeka, Croatia | (Serbia) Dušan Borković | (Serbia) Dušan Borković | (Serbia) Dušan Borković | (Hungary) M1RA |
| 1 | 2 | Automotodrom Grobnik, Rijeka, Croatia | | (Serbia) Dušan Borković | (Serbia) Dušan Borković | (Hungary) M1RA |
| 2 | 3 | Automotodróm Slovakia Ring, Orechová Potôň, Slovakia | (Serbia) Dušan Borković | (Serbia) Dušan Borković | (Serbia) Dušan Borković | (Hungary) M1RA |
| 2 | 4 | Automotodróm Slovakia Ring, Orechová Potôň, Slovakia | | (Serbia) Dušan Borković | (Serbia) Dušan Borković | (Hungary) M1RA |
| 3 | 5 | Automotodrom Brno, Brno, Czech Republic | (Serbia) Dušan Borković | (Serbia) Dušan Borković | (Serbia) Dušan Borković | (Hungary) M1RA |
| 3 | 6 | Automotodrom Brno, Brno, Czech Republic | | (Serbia) Dušan Borković | (Serbia) Dušan Borković | (Hungary) M1RA |
| 4 | 7 | Hungaroring, Budapest, Hungary | (Serbia) Dušan Borković | (Serbia) Milovan Vesnić | (Serbia) Dušan Borković | (Hungary) M1RA |
| 4 | 8 | Hungaroring, Budapest, Hungary | | (Czech Republic) Jáchym Galáš | (Serbia) Dušan Borković | (Hungary) M1RA |

=== Drivers' standings ===
Scoring system

| Position | **1st** | **2nd** | **3rd** | **4th** | **5th** | **6th** | **7th** | **8th** | **9th** | **10th** |
| Race | 25 | 18 | 15 | 12 | 10 | 8 | 6 | 4 | 2 | 1 |

| Pos. | Driver | GRO (Croatia) | | SVK (Slovakia) | | BRN (Czech Republic) | | HUN (Hungary) | | Pts. |
| Pos. | Driver | R1 | R2 | R1 | R2 | R1 | R2 | R1 | R2 | Pts. |
|---|---|---|---|---|---|---|---|---|---|---|
| 1 | (Serbia) Dušan Borković | **1** | 1 | **1** | 1 | **1** | 1 | **1** | 1 | 200 |
| 2 | (Serbia) Milovan Vesnić | 2 | 2 | | | 4 | 2 | 7 | 4 | 84 |
| 3 | (Czech Republic) Jáchym Galáš | 5 | 4 | 5 | DSQ | 6 | 6 | 2 | 2 | 84 |
| 4 | (Czech Republic) Michal Makeš | 8 | 7 | 16 | 4 | 5 | 4 | 8 | 3 | 63 |
| 5 | (Poland) Szymon Jabłonski | Ret | Ret | 4 | DSQ | 3 | 3 | 4 | 6 | 62 |
| 6 | (Austria) Sandro Soubek | | | 3 | 3 | 2 | 13 | 10 | 10 | 50 |
| 7 | (Hungary) Bence Boldizs | 4 | 5 | 7 | 2 | | | | | 46 |
| 8 | (Slovakia) Mat'o Konopka | 3 | 3 | | | | | | | 30 |
| 9 | (Czech Republic) Dušan Kouřil Jr. | 7 | 9 | 2 | 12 | 15 | 14 | | | 26 |
| 10 | (Germany) Carol Wittke | 11 | 8 | 8 | Ret | 7 | 5 | | | 24 |
| 11 | (Poland) Szymon Ładniak | 12 | 14 | 15 | 7 | 11 | 7 | 9 | 5 | 24 |
| 12 | (Poland) Łukasz Stolarczyk | 10 | 13 | 13 | 8 | 14 | 9 | 5 | 8 | 21 |
| 13 | (Slovakia) Tomáš Korený | | | | | | | 3 | 7 | 21 |
| 14 | (Czech Republic) Radim Adámek | 14 | 12 | 12 | 9 | 10 | 8 | 6 | 9 | 17 |
| 15 | (North Macedonia) Igor Stefanovski | 6 | 6 | | | | | | | 16 |
| 16 | (Czech Republic) Petr Čížek | 16† | Ret | 9 | 5 | 8 | 15 | | | 16 |
| 17 | (Poland) Jakub Wyszomirski | | | 6 | 13 | 9 | 16 | | | 10 |
| 18 | (Hungary) Gábor Kismarty-Lechner | Ret | Ret | 10 | 6 | | | | | 9 |
| 19 | (Serbia) Nemanja Milovanović | 9 | 11 | | | | | | | 2 |
| 20 | (Croatia) Žarko Knego | 13 | 10 | Ret | Ret | | | | | 1 |
| 21 | (Austria) Rene Martinek | | | 14 | 10 | 12 | 11 | | | 1 |
| 22 | (Serbia) Rudolf Pešović | | | | | 16 | 10 | | | 1 |
| 23 | (Poland) Sebastian Kołakowski | 15 | 15 | 11 | 11 | 13 | 12 | | | 0 |
| - | (Croatia) Zoran Kotromanović | | | | | | | WD | WD | - |
| Pos. | Driver | GRO (Croatia) | | SVK (Slovakia) | | BRN (Czech Republic) | | HUN (Hungary) | | Pts. |

| Colour | Result |
|---|---|
| Gold | Winner |
| Silver | Second place |
| Bronze | Third place |
| Green | Points classification |
| Blue | Non-points classification |
| Blue | Non-classified finish (NC) |
| Purple | Retired, not classified (Ret) |
| Red | Did not qualify (DNQ) |
| Red | Did not pre-qualify (DNPQ) |
| Black | Disqualified (DSQ) |
| White | Did not start (DNS) |
| White | Withdrew (WD) |
| White | Race cancelled (C) |
| Blank | Did not practice (DNP) |
| Blank | Did not arrive (DNA) |
| Blank | Excluded (EX) |

**Bold** – Pole

Italics – Fastest Lap

† – Drivers did not finish the race, but were classified as they completed over 70% of the race distance.

=== Teams' standings ===
| Pos. | Team | GRO (Croatia) | | SVK (Slovakia) | | BRN (Czech Republic) | | HUN (Hungary) | | Pts. |
| Pos. | Team | RD1 | RD2 | RD1 | RD2 | RD1 | RD2 | RD1 | RD2 | Pts. |
|---|---|---|---|---|---|---|---|---|---|---|
| 1 | (Hungary) M1RA | **1** | 1 | **1** | 1 | **1** | 1 | 1 | 1 | 200 |
| 2 | (Czech Republic) GT2 Motorsport | 5 | 4 | 5 | 7 | 6 | 6 | 2 | 2 | 108 |
| 2 | (Czech Republic) GT2 Motorsport | 12 | 14 | 15 | DSQ | 11 | 7 | 9 | 5 | 108 |
| 3 | (Serbia) ASK Vesnić | 2 | 2 | | | 4 | 2 | 7 | 4 | 84 |
| 4 | (Czech Republic) Mičánek Motorsport | 8 | 7 | 16 | 4 | 5 | 4 | 8 | 3 | 63 |
| 5 | (Poland) BM Racing Team | Ret | Ret | 4 | DSQ | 3 | 3 | 4 | 6 | 62 |
| 6 | (Hungary) Zengő Motorsport | 4 | 5 | 7 | 2 | | | | | 55 |
| 6 | (Hungary) Zengő Motorsport | Ret | Ret | 10 | 6 | | | | | 55 |
| 7 | (Austria) MAIR Racing Osttirol | | | 3 | 3 | 2 | 13 | 10 | 10 | 50 |
| 8 | (Czech Republic) ACCR Czech Talent Team | 7 | 9 | 2 | 12 | 15 | 14 | 3 | 7 | 47 |
| 9 | (Czech Republic) Fullín Race Academy | 11 | 8 | 8 | 5 | 7 | 5 | | | 40 |
| 9 | (Czech Republic) Fullín Race Academy | 16† | Ret | 9 | Ret | 8 | 15 | | | 40 |
| 10 | (Slovakia) ARC Bratislava | 3 | 3 | | | | | | | 30 |
| 11 | (Poland) BTC Maszyny Racing | 10 | 13 | 13 | 8 | 14 | 9 | 5 | 8 | 21 |
| 12 | (Czech Republic) Horňák-Aditis | 14 | 12 | 12 | 9 | 10 | 8 | 6 | 9 | 17 |
| 13 | (North Macedonia) LPR Stefanovski Racing Team | 6 | 6 | | | | | | | 16 |
| 14 | (Poland) Wyszomirski Racing | 15 | 15 | 6 | 11 | 9 | 12 | | | 10 |
| 14 | (Poland) Wyszomirski Racing | | | 11 | 13 | 13 | 16 | | | 10 |
| 15 | (Serbia) GM Racing Team | 9 | 11 | | | 16 | 10 | WD | WD | 3 |
| 16 | (Croatia) Auto Klub Dubrovnik Racing | 13 | 10 | Ret | Ret | | | | | 1 |
| 17 | (Austria) MSC Rottenegg | | | 14 | 10 | 12 | 11 | | | 1 |
| Pos. | Team | GRO (Croatia) | | SVK (Slovakia) | | BRN (Czech Republic) | | HUN (Hungary) | | Pts. |

| Colour | Result |
|---|---|
| Gold | Winner |
| Silver | Second place |
| Bronze | Third place |
| Green | Points classification |
| Blue | Non-points classification |
| Blue | Non-classified finish (NC) |
| Purple | Retired, not classified (Ret) |
| Red | Did not qualify (DNQ) |
| Red | Did not pre-qualify (DNPQ) |
| Black | Disqualified (DSQ) |
| White | Did not start (DNS) |
| White | Withdrew (WD) |
| White | Race cancelled (C) |
| Blank | Did not practice (DNP) |
| Blank | Did not arrive (DNA) |
| Blank | Excluded (EX) |

**Bold** – Pole

Italics – Fastest Lap

† – Drivers did not finish the race, but were classified as they completed over 70% of the race distance.

=== Juniors' standings ===
| Pos. | Driver | GRO (Croatia) | | SVK (Slovakia) | | BRN (Czech Republic) | | HUN (Hungary) | | Pts. |
| Pos. | Driver | RD1 | RD2 | RD1 | RD2 | RD1 | RD2 | RD1 | RD2 | Pts. |
|---|---|---|---|---|---|---|---|---|---|---|
| 1 | (Czech Republic) Jáchym Galáš | 5 | 4 | 5 | DSQ | 6 | 6 | 2 | 2 | 84 |
| 2 | (Czech Republic) Michal Makeš | 8 | 7 | 16 | 4 | 5 | 4 | 8 | 3 | 63 |
| 3 | (Poland) Szymon Jabłonski | Ret | Ret | 4 | DSQ | 3 | 3 | 4 | 6 | 62 |
| 4 | (Czech Republic) Dušan Kouřil Jr. | 7 | 9 | 2 | 12 | 15 | 14 | | | 26 |
| 5 | (Poland) Szymon Ładniak | 12 | 14 | 15 | 7 | 11 | 7 | 9 | 5 | 24 |
| 6 | (Slovakia) Tomáš Korený | | | | | | | 3 | 7 | 21 |
| Pos. | Driver | GRO (Croatia) | | SVK (Slovakia) | | BRN (Czech Republic) | | HUN (Hungary) | | Pts. |

| Colour | Result |
|---|---|
| Gold | Winner |
| Silver | Second place |
| Bronze | Third place |
| Green | Points classification |
| Blue | Non-points classification |
| Blue | Non-classified finish (NC) |
| Purple | Retired, not classified (Ret) |
| Red | Did not qualify (DNQ) |
| Red | Did not pre-qualify (DNPQ) |
| Black | Disqualified (DSQ) |
| White | Did not start (DNS) |
| White | Withdrew (WD) |
| White | Race cancelled (C) |
| Blank | Did not practice (DNP) |
| Blank | Did not arrive (DNA) |
| Blank | Excluded (EX) |

**Bold** – Pole

Italics – Fastest Lap

† – Drivers did not finish the race, but were classified as they completed over 70% of the race distance.
