= Gary Sheehan (racing driver) =

American racing driver (born 1968)

- Born: December 23, 1968 (age 57) New York City, New York, U.S.

TCR International Series career
- Debut season: 2016
- Current team: Liqui Moly Team Engstler
- Car number: 47
- Starts: 2

Previous series
- 2007-12 2007-10 2006 2004-05 2000-03, 14-21 1995-98 1992-94: 25 Hours of Thunderhill; Global Time Attack; Speed World Challenge; Grand-Am Road Racing; US Touring Car Championship; Bridgestone Racing School; Jim Russell Racing School

Championship titles
- 2000, 14, 18-20: US Touring Car Championship

Gary Sheehan (born December 23, 1968) is an American racing driver currently competing in the TCR International Series. Having previously competed in the Speed World Challenge, Grand-Am Cup, Global Time Attack & US Touring Car Championship, amongst others.

== Racing career ==
Sheehan began his career in 1992 in the Jim Russell Racing School Formula 2000 Series, he raced there for many seasons up until 1994. In 1995 he switched to the Bridgestone Racing School Formula 2000 Championship, he raced there for four seasons and finished 2nd in the championship in 1997. He switched to the US Touring Car Championship for 2000, winning the championship title in his first season in the championship. He went on to finish 2nd in the standings in 2001, 2002 & 2003. In 2004 he switched to the Grand-Am Road Racing series, racing in both the GS and ST Classes. In 2005 he only raced in the ST Class. For 2006 he switched to the Speed World Challenge, only racing a single weekend in the championship. Between 2007 & 2012 he raced in the Global Time Attack series and the 25 Hours of Thunderhill. In 2014 he returned to the US Touring Car Championship in a Hyundai Genesis Coupe 3.8L, winning the championship that year, as well as 2018, 2019, 2020, and 2021.

In June 2016 it was announced that he would race in the TCR International Series, driving a Volkswagen Golf GTI TCR for Liqui Moly Team Engstler.

== Racing record ==
=== Complete TCR International Series results ===
(key) (Races in bold indicate pole position) (Races in italics indicate fastest lap)

Year	Team	Car	1	2	3	4	5	6	7	8	9	10	11	12	13	14	15	16	17	18	19	20	21	22	DC	Points
2016	Liqui Moly Team Engstler	Volkswagen Golf GTI TCR	BHR; 1	BHR; 2	POR; 1	POR; 2	BEL; 1	BEL; 2	ITA; 1	ITA; 2	AUT; 1	AUT; 2	GER; 1; 11†	GER; 2; 11	RUS; 1	RUS; 2	THA; 1	THA; 2	SIN; 1	SIN; 2	MYS; 1	MYS; 2	MAC; 1	MAC; 2	NC	0

^{†} Driver did not finish the race, but was classified as he completed over 90% of the race distance.

=== Complete USTCC Series results ===
(key) (Races in bold indicate pole position) (Races in italics indicate fastest lap)

Year	Team	Car	1	2	3	4	5	6	7	8	DC	Points
2021	GoGoGear.com	Hyundai Genesis Coupe 3.8L	Las Vegas Motor Speedway; 1	Auto Club Speedway; 1	Sonoma Raceway 4	WeatherTech Raceway Laguna Seca; 3	WeatherTech Raceway Laguna Seca; 1	WeatherTech Raceway Laguna Seca; 1	Buttonwillow Raceway Park TBD	Thunderhill Raceway Park TBD	1	605
2020	GoGoGear.com	Hyundai Genesis Coupe 3.8L	Buttonwillow Raceway Park 1	Thunderhill Raceway Park 1	Sonoma Raceway 2	Buttonwillow Raceway Park 4	Buttonwillow Raceway Park 5	Sonoma Raceway 1			1	600
2019	GoGoGear.com	Hyundai Genesis Coupe 3.8L	Las Vegas Motor Speedway; 1	Auto Club Speedway; 1	Sonoma Raceway 2	WeatherTech Raceway Laguna Seca; 2	Thunderhill Raceway Park 1	Sonoma Raceway 2	Sonoma Raceway 1		1	795
2018	GoGoGear.com	Hyundai Genesis Coupe 3.8L	Thunderhill Raceway Park 2	Auto Club Speedway; 1	Sonoma Raceway 1	WeatherTech Raceway Laguna Seca; 2	Sonoma Raceway 1	Thunderhill Raceway Park 1	Thunderhill Raceway Park 3		1	680
2017	GoGoGear.com	Hyundai Genesis Coupe 3.8L	Mazda Raceway Laguna Seca 5	Auto Club Speedway; 1	Sonoma Raceway 3	Thunderhill Raceway Park 5	Mazda Raceway Laguna Seca 1	Sonoma Raceway 3	Thunderhill Raceway Park 3	Thunderhill Raceway Park 2	2	735

^{†} Driver did not finish the race, but was classified as he completed over 90% of the race distance.
