= Hussain Karimi =

Bahraini racing driver

- Born: 15 December 1983 (age 42) Manama, Bahrain

TCR International Series career
- Debut season: 2016
- Current team: Bas Koeten Racing
- Car number: 79
- Starts: 2

Previous series
- 2010-16: BIC 2000cc Challenge

Hussain Karimi (born 15 December 1983) is a Bahraini racing driver currently competing in the Bahrain International Circuit 2000cc Challenge. Having previously competed in the TCR International Series.

== Racing career ==
Karimi began his career in 2010 in the Bahrain International Circuit 2000cc Challenge, he still races there and is currently 3rd the 2016 championship standings. He previously finished runner-up in the championship in 2014 and 2015, taking several victories those years.

In March 2016 it was announced that he would race in the TCR International Series at his home event at the Bahrain International Circuit, driving a SEAT León Cup Racer for Bas Koeten Racing.

== Racing record ==
=== Complete TCR International Series results ===
(key) (Races in bold indicate pole position) (Races in italics indicate fastest lap)

Year	Team	Car	1	2	3	4	5	6	7	8	9	10	11	12	13	14	15	16	17	18	19	20	21	22	DC	Points
2016	Bas Koeten Racing	SEAT León Cup Racer	BHR; 1; 17	BHR; 2; 12	POR; 1	POR; 2	BEL; 1	BEL; 2	ITA; 1	ITA; 2	AUT; 1	AUT; 2	GER; 1	GER; 2	RUS; 1	RUS; 2	THA; 1	THA; 2	SIN; 1	SIN; 2	MYS; 1	MYS; 2	MAC; 1	MAC; 2	NC	0
