= M1RA =

Hungarian auto racing team

(Hungary) M1RA
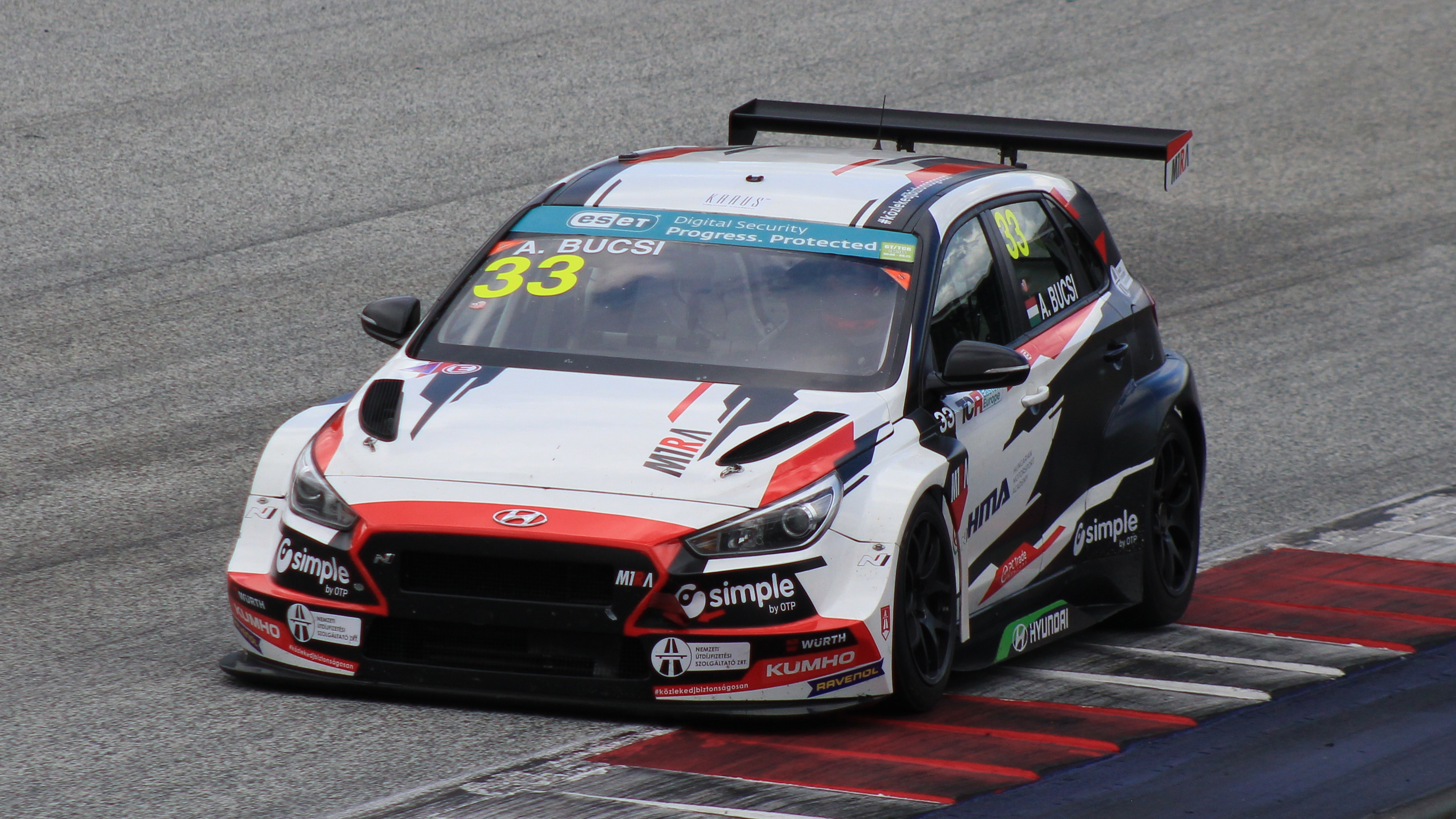
- Founded: 2017
- Team principal(s): Norbert Michelisz; Dávid Bári
- Current series: TCR Eastern Europe Trophy
- Former series: TCR International Series; TCR Europe Touring Car Series
- Current drivers: 8. (Germany) Luca Engstler; 999. (Hungary) Dániel Nagy
- Teams' Championships: 2017 TCR International Series; 2020 TCR Eastern Europe Trophy
- Drivers' Championships: 2020 TCR Eastern Europe Trophy

M1RA is a Hungarian auto racing team based in Kecskemét, Hungary. The team currently participates in the TCR Europe Series.

== TCR International Series ==
=== Honda Civic Type R TCR FK2 (2017) ===
The team was formed in March 2017 by World Touring Car Championship driver Norbert Michelisz and race engineer Dávid Bári. The team fields two Honda Civic Type R TCR for veteran driver Roberto Colciago and Attila Tassi while Michelisz drove an additional Civic at Hungaroring.

=== Hyundai i30 N TCR (2018-) ===
The team switched from Honda to Hyundai and Dániel Nagy, Francisco Mora joined the team, also the team switched from TCR International Series to TCR Europe Series.

== Name ==
M1 means that they wanted to create the best Hungarian racing team, the RA is the abbreviation of Racing. You pronounce it as Mira, which can mean Michelisz Racing. This word has more meaning: in Italian 'target', in Spanish 'view', in Russian 'peace'. Michelisz has a daughter called Mira.

== Results ==
=== TCR International Series ===
Year	Car	Drivers	Races	Wins	Poles	F.L.	Points	D.C.	T.C.
2017	Honda Civic Type R TCR	(Hungary) Attila Tassi	20	2	0	2	197	2nd	1st
2017	Honda Civic Type R TCR	(Italy) Roberto Colciago	17	3	0	0	161	5th	1st
2017	Honda Civic Type R TCR	(Italy) Giacomo Altoè†	16	0	0	0	63	13th	1st
2017	Honda Civic Type R TCR	(Hungary) Norbert Michelisz	4	1	1	1	59	14th	1st
2017	Honda Civic Type R TCR	(United Kingdom) Josh Files	2	0	0	0	23	23rd	1st

† Altoè competed for WestCoast Racing until round 7.

=== TCR Europe Touring Car Series ===
Year	Car	Drivers	Races	Wins	Poles	F.L.	Points	D.C.	T.C.
2018	Hyundai i30 N TCR	(Hungary) Dániel Nagy	14	1	0	1	138	5th	4th
2018	Hyundai i30 N TCR	(Portugal) Francisco Mora	8	1	0	0	44	10th	4th
2018	Hyundai i30 N TCR	(Hungary) Norbert Michelisz	2	0	0	0	28	16th	4th
2018	Hyundai i30 N TCR	(Italy) Nicola Baldan†	4	0	0	0	1	28th	4th
2019	Hyundai i30 N TCR	(Germany) Luca Engstler	14	1	0	1	192	9th	4th
2019	Hyundai i30 N TCR	(Hungary) Dániel Nagy	8	0	0	0	60	21st	4th
2019	Hyundai i30 N TCR	(Hungary) Zsolt Szabó	4	0	0	0	16	30th	4th

† Baldan drove for Pit Lane Competizioni in round 1.

=== World Touring Car Cup ===
Year	Car	Drivers	Races	Wins	Poles	F.L.	Points	D.C.	T.C.
2018	Hyundai i30 N TCR	(Hungary) Dániel Nagy	3	0	0	1	36	20th	NC

=== TCR Eastern Europe Trophy ===
Year	Car	Drivers	Races	Wins	Poles	F.L.	Points	D.C.	T.C.
2020	Hyundai i30 N TCR	(Serbia) Dušan Borković	8	8	4	6	200	1st	1st
2021	Hyundai i30 N TCR	(Hungary) Gergő Báldi	2	0	0	0	4	20th	15th
2023	Hyundai i30 N TCR	(Hungary) Attila Bucsi	2	1	1	1	37	11th	8th
2024	Hyundai i30 N TCR	(Hungary) Attila Bucsi	8	1	3	2	141	3rd	3rd

=== Pure ETCR Championship ===
Year	Car	Drivers	Races	Wins	Points	D.C.	T.C.
2021	Alfa Romeo Giulia ETCR	(Brazil) Rodrigo Baptista	5	0	248	5th	2nd
2021	Alfa Romeo Giulia ETCR	(Italy) Luca Filippi	5	0	218	7th	2nd
2021	Alfa Romeo Giulia ETCR	(United Kingdom) Oliver Webb	4	0	177	9th	2nd
2021	Alfa Romeo Giulia ETCR	(Austria) Philipp Eng	3	1	159	11th	2nd
2021	Alfa Romeo Giulia ETCR	(Italy) Luigi Ferrara	1	0	36	13th	2nd
2021	Alfa Romeo Giulia ETCR	(Monaco) Stefano Coletti	2	0	22	14th	2nd
