= Honda Civic Type R TCR =

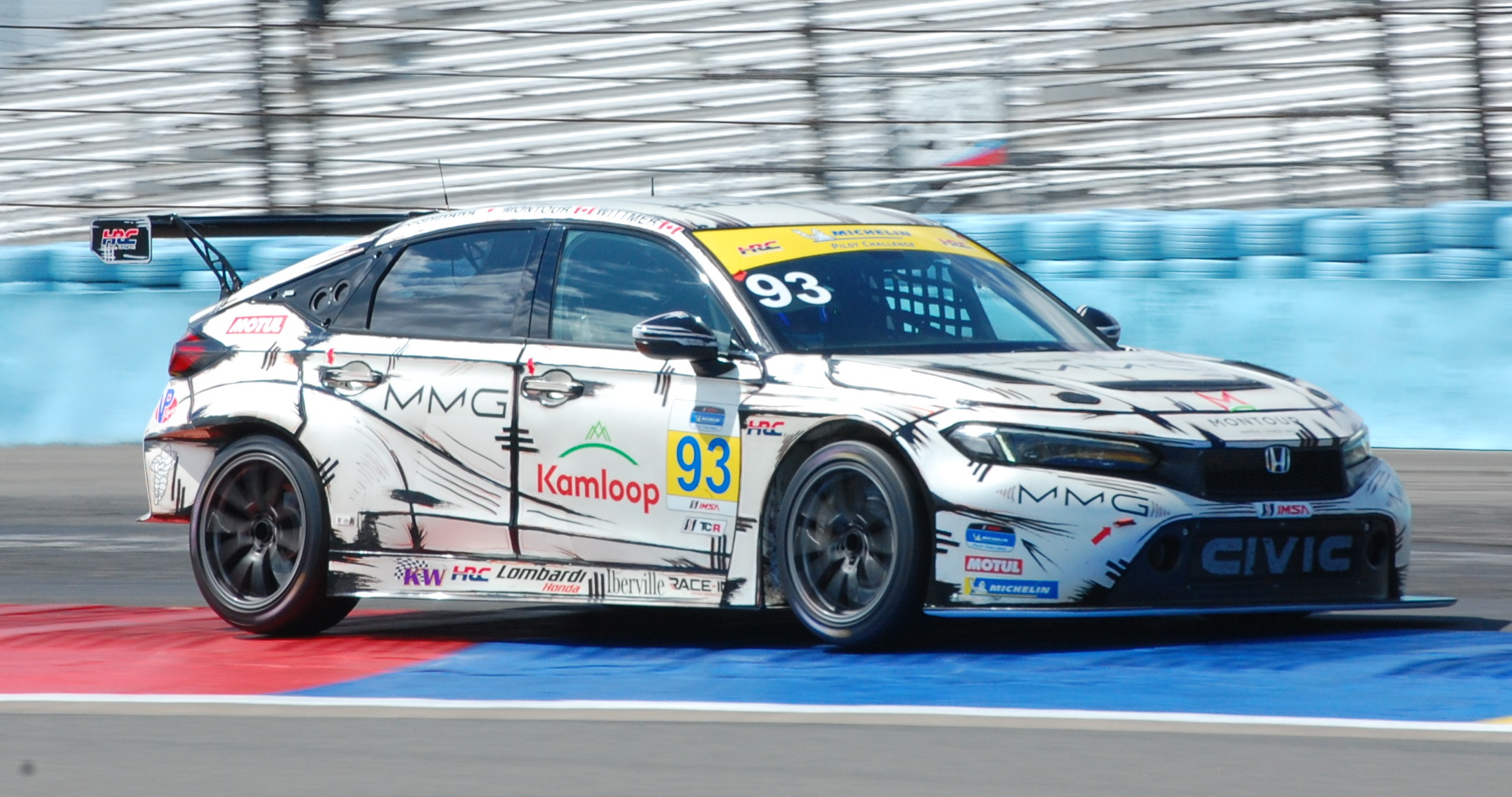
- The No. 93 Civic Type R TCR (FL5) of Montreal Motorsport Group during the 2025 LP Building Solutions 120
- Category: TCR Touring Car
- Constructor: Honda

Technical specifications
- Chassis: Honda Civic Type R
- Engine: K20C1 1,996 cc (121.8 cu in) 340 hp (254 kW; 345 PS) I4 turbocharged front-mounted, FWD
- Transmission: Xtrac 6-speed Sequential
- Weight: 1,265 kg (2,788.8 lb)

Competition history
- Debut: 2015 TCR International Series Sepang round

The Honda Civic Type R TCR is a racing car built on the basis of the TCR rules established in 2015, which is included in the World Touring Car Cup under the direction of the FIA. In 2019, 2020, and 2024, it won the TCR Model of the Year award, which is given for the most successful car in the category across a year.

== History ==
=== FK2 (2015) ===
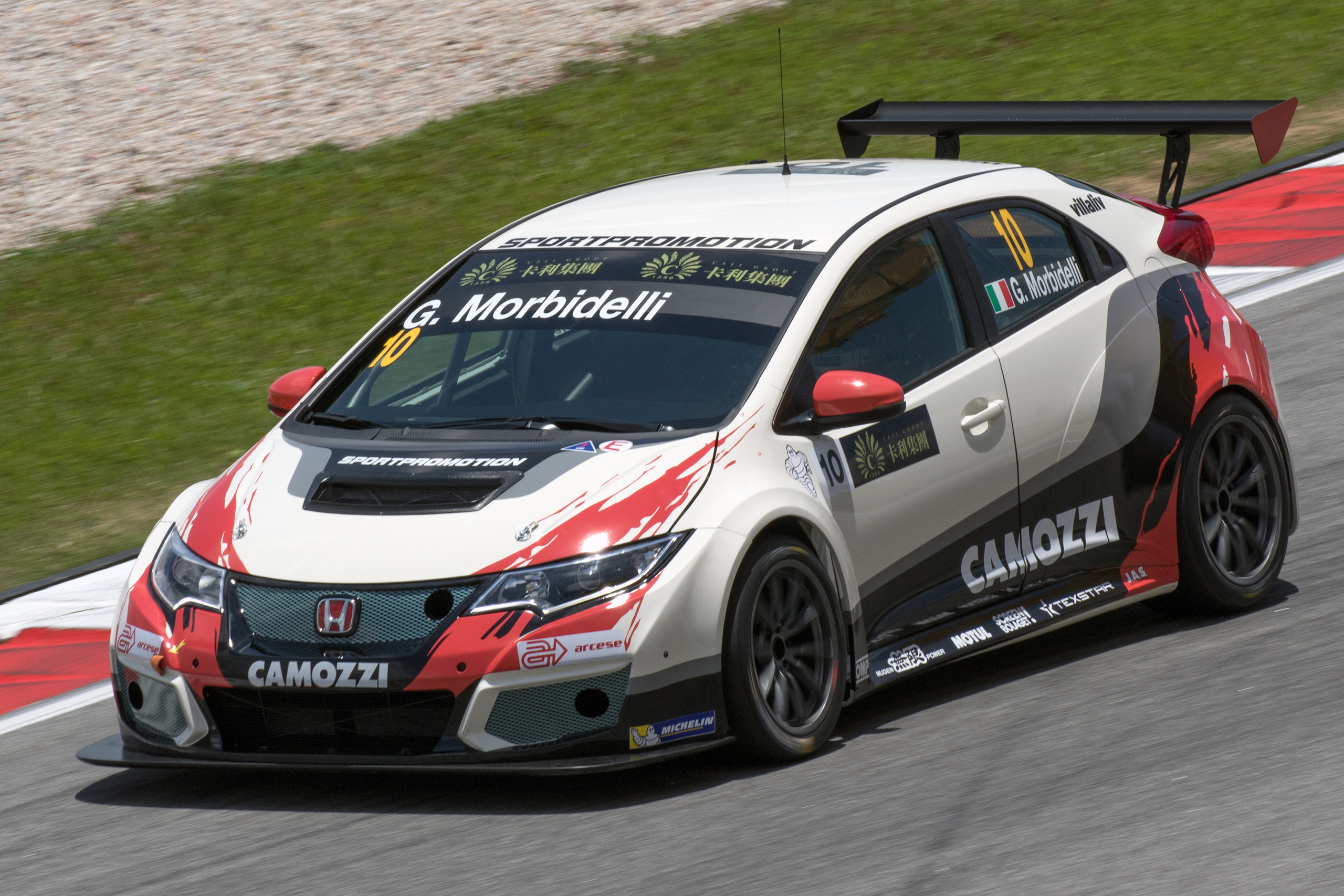
Gianni Morbidelli at Sepang International Circuit in the 2015 TCR International Series

The first Civic Type R TCR was built on the ninth generation Honda Civic and debuted in the TCR International Series in 2015, until the end of 2017, including Gianni Morbidelli, Roberto Colciago and Attila Tassi racing with machines developed by JAS Motorsport, the last two riders fought for the individual championship title (as a teammate) in the 2017 season, with Tassi finishing in second place behind Jean-Karl Vernay, while Colciago finished fifth in the overall standings, their team won by the teams led by Norbert Michelisz and David Bári. In the ADAC TCR Germany Touring Car Championship, British driver Josh Files won an individual championship for the model in 2017.

=== FK7/FK8 (2017) ===
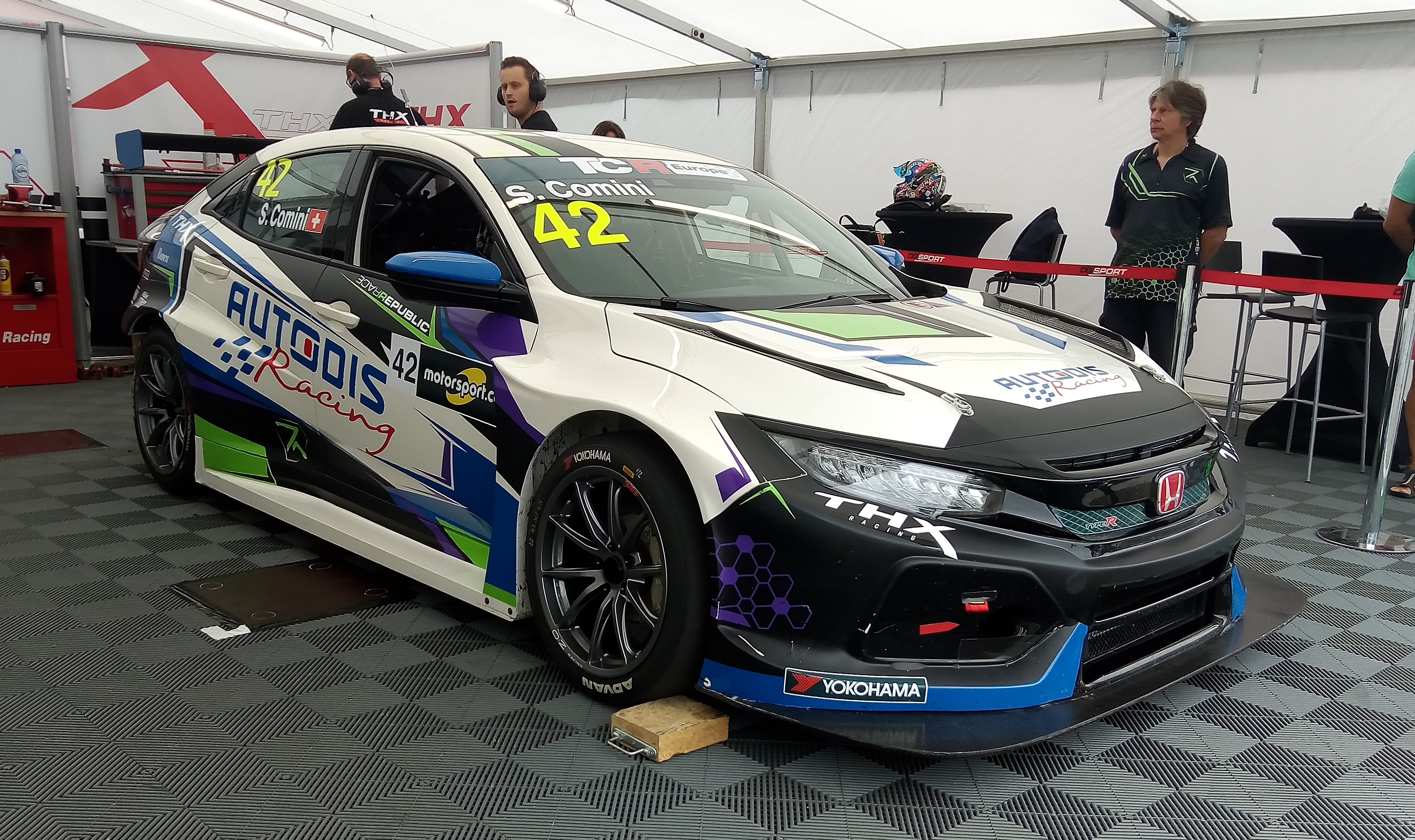
Stefano Comini's Civic at the 2018 TCR Europe Series round at Spa-Francorchamps.

The thoroughly revised version introduced in 2017 is based on the street version of the tenth generation Civic – which later set a lap record on the Nürburgring Nordschleife – but has been modified at several points on the street model body to reduce air resistance and greater clamping force. The car is based on the narrower FK7 Civic chassis as it was deemed to suit the demands of the formula better than the wider FK8 chassis of the road-going Type R. A new multi-link rear suspension and modified stabilizer have been used, a state-of-the-art electronic control unit (ECU) and an improved roll bar have been installed. An endurance version of the car was also made for customers in long-distance races; this edition was equipped with headlights and an air intake system to cool the driver, as well as brakes complete with ABS. The new model has 340 horsepower and a maximum torque of 420 Nm.

The model began selling to customer teams on 15 December 2017. For the year 2018, a total of 25 copies of the new model were available (this number was already 133 on 18 December 2019).

=== FL5 (2023) ===
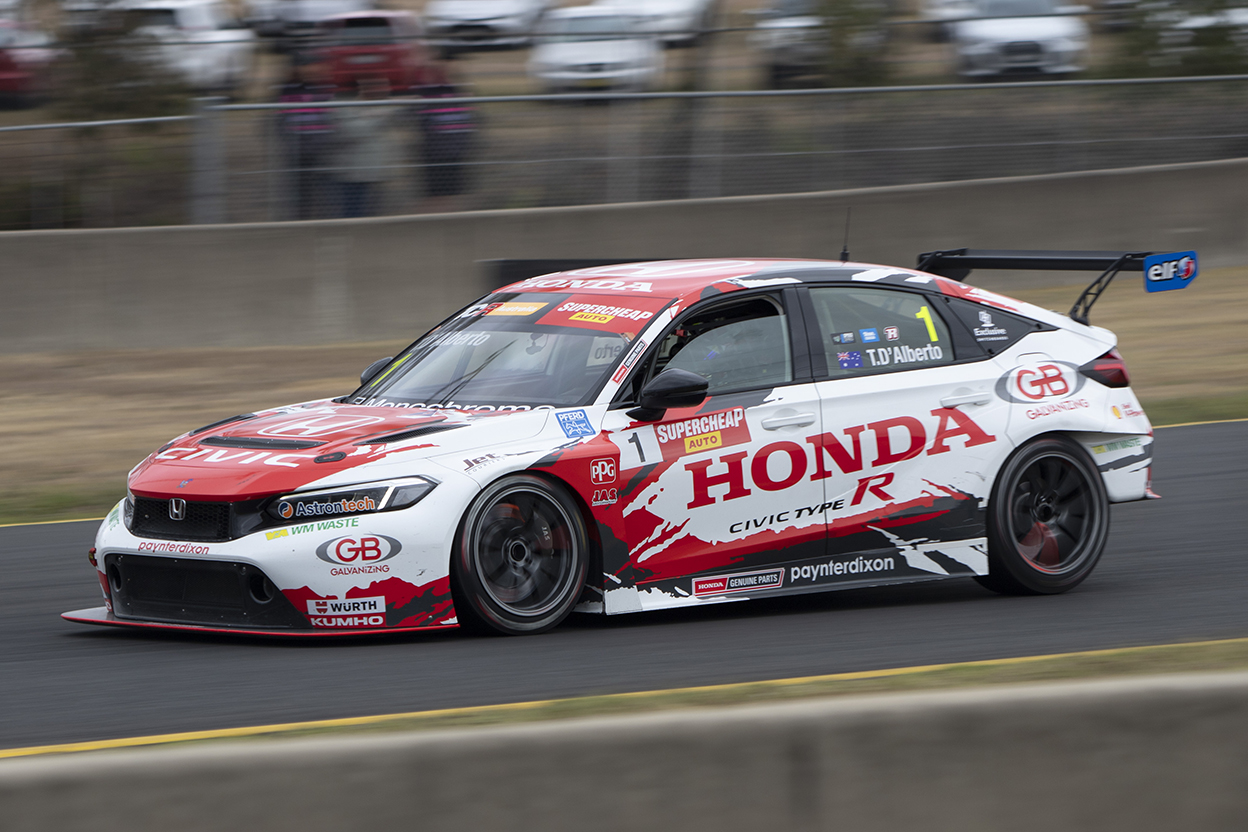
Tony D'Alberto's Civic at the 2023 Race Sydney at Sydney Motorsport Park

The third Civic Type R TCR was built on the eleventh generation Honda Civic and made its global debut in TCR UK Touring Car Championship in 2023. The car utilizes a new aerodynamic system and exterior system, a new chassis, upgraded braking and transmission systems.

== Championship titles ==
Year	Title	Competitor
2017	TCR International Series Teams' championship	(Hungary) M1RA
2017	ADAC TCR Germany Touring Car Championship Drivers' championship	(United Kingdom) Josh Files
2017	ADAC TCR Germany Touring Car Championship Teams' championship	(United Kingdom) Target Competition UK-SUI
2017	TCR Middle East Series Drivers' championship	(United Kingdom) Josh Files
2018	TCR Europe Touring Car Series Teams' championship	(Hong Kong) Hell Energy Racing with KCMG
2019	TCR Middle East Touring Car Series Drivers' championship	(Germany) René Münnich
2019	TCR Middle East Touring Car Series Teams' championship	(Germany) ALL-INKL.COM Münnich Motorsport
2019	Canadian Touring Car Championship	(Canada) Gary Kwok
2019	TCR Japan Touring Car Series Drivers' Saturday championship	(United Kingdom) Matt Howson
2019	TCR Japan Touring Car Series Gentlemans' Saturday Cup	(Japan) Yukinori Taniguchi
2019	TCR Japan Touring Car Series Teams' championship	(Hong Kong) KCMG
2019	TCR China Touring Car Championship Manufacturers' championship	(Macau) Dongfeng Honda Racing Team
2019	ADAC TCR Germany Touring Car Championship Junior Cup	(Germany) Michelle Halder
2020	TCR Denmark Touring Car Series Drivers' championship	(Denmark) Kasper Jensen
2020	ADAC TCR Germany Touring Car Championship Junior Cup	(Germany) Marcel Fugel
2020	TCR Japan Touring Car Series Drivers' Saturday Bronze Cup	(Japan) Rio Shimono
2021	TCR Denmark Touring Car Series Drivers' Championship	(Denmark) Kasper Jensen
2022	TCR Denmark Touring Car Series Drivers' Championship	(Denmark) Kasper Jensen
2022	TCR UK Touring Car Championship Drivers' Championship	(United Kingdom) Chris Smiley
2023	TCR Denmark Touring Car Series Drivers' Championship	(Denmark) Kasper Jensen
2023	TCR Denmark Touring Car Series Teams' Championship	(Denmark) GMB Motorsport
