= Pepe Oriola =

Spanish racing driver (born 1994)

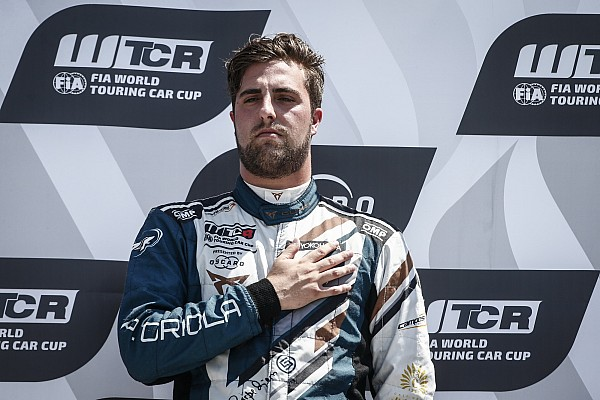
- Oriola at the 2018 FIA WTCR Race of Slovakia.
- Nationality: Spanish
- Born: Josep Oriola Vila; 9 July 1994 (age 32) Barcelona, Spain

World Touring Car Cup career
- Debut season: 2011
- Current team: Campos Racing
- Car number: 74
- Former teams: Tuenti Racing Team; SUNRED Engineering; Craft-Bamboo Racing
- Starts: 150
- Wins: 20
- Poles: 3
- Fastest laps: 20
- Best finish: 2nd in 2015

Previous series
- 2010 2009–2010: WTCC; SEAT León Eurocup Spain

Championship titles
- 2021: TCR South America Touring Car Championship

Josep "Pepe" Oriola Vila (born 9 July 1994) is a Spanish racing driver. He became the youngest driver to race in the World Touring Car Championship when he competed in the 2011 season. Oriola is not only the youngest driver to start a WTCC race at the age of 16, he is also the youngest to be on the podium and to have won a race. Feats he achieved in Brazil in 2011 and Morocco in 2013 respectively. His record of being the youngest driver ever to compete, score championship points and win a race in the prestigious WTCC remains to this day. In 2018, he competed in the World Touring Car Cup and finish sixth in a close title fight till the last rounds in Macau. In 2019, he switched from factory driver of CUPRA to Hyundai Motorsport. Oriola also won the first 24h race of only TCR Cars in Spa Francorchamps in 2019 with the team Red Camel-Jordans. He is part of the team Changan Ford in China Touring Car Championship CTCC where in 2019 won three races.

== Career ==
=== Early years ===
Born in Barcelona, Oriola began his career in karting in 2004 at the age of nine. He switched to touring cars at the end of 2009 at the age of 15 when he competed in the final round of the SEAT León Supercopa Spain, finishing on the podium. In 2010, he competed in full seasons of both the Spanish Supercopa and SEAT León Eurocup with the Monlau Competition team. He took his first victory at the second Eurocup race at Brands Hatch, which was shortened due to a heavy accident involving Francisco Carvalho. He then took a double victory at the season finale at Valencia to move up to fourth in the final Eurocup standings. He also finished fourth in the Supercopa standings.

=== World Touring Car Championship ===
In 2011, Oriola raced a SEAT León in the World Touring Car Championship for Sunred Engineering. He became the youngest ever driver in the series when he made his debut, aged 16 years, 8 months and 11 days at the 2011 FIA WTCC Race of Brazil. He scored his first points in the second race of the season at Curitiba.

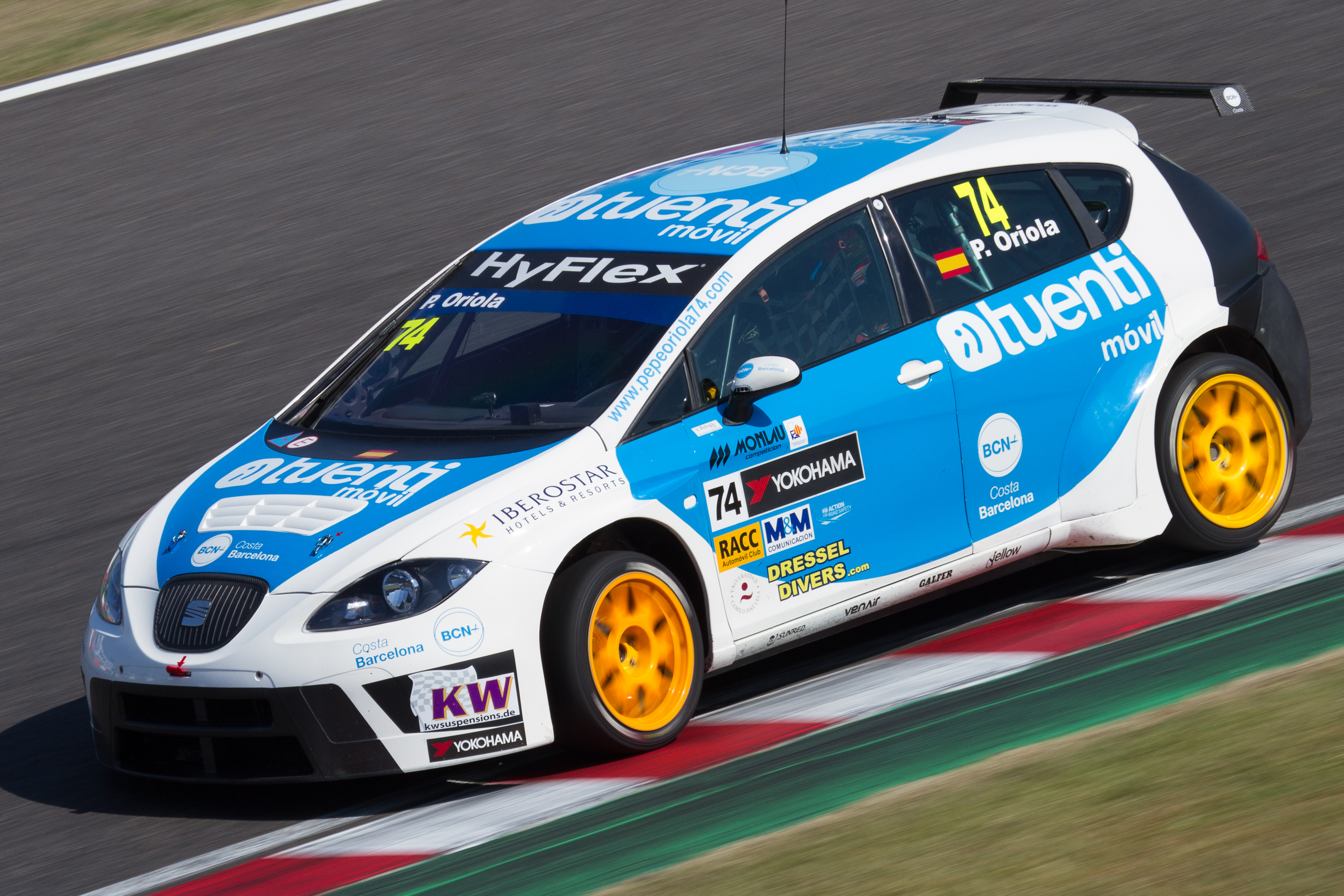
Oriola driving for Tuenti Racing Team at the 2012 FIA WTCC Race of Japan.

Oriola would continue in the WTCC in 2012, staying with Sunred but now racing under the Tuenti Racing Team banner. He left the first round in Italy in a three way tie for first place in the Yokohama Trophy with Stefano D'Aste and Alex MacDowall, having started from the class pole position in race one. He took his first overall podium finish in race two of the Race of Portugal. Oriola spent much of the season at the top of the Yokohama Trophy but dropped behind Norbert Michelisz in the standings after the Race of Brazil. He took his second podium finish of the season in race two of the Race of Japan with second place behind Stefano D'Aste having started from that position on the reversed grid.

Oriola stayed in the WTCC for the 2013 season driving for the Tuenti Racing Team. He would not be eligible for the Yokohama Trophy as the team was now run by SEAT Sport. At the season opening Race of Italy he qualified fourth as the best placed SEAT driver on the grid. He retired from race one with a puncture having been running fifth and finished sixth in race two. On 7 April 2013 at the Race of Morocco, Oriola became the youngest person to win a WTCC race when he claimed victory in race two. After the Race of Russia, Oriola confirmed he would be switching to a Chevrolet Cruze car for the following round in Portugal.

== Racing record ==
=== Career summary ===
Season	Series	Team	Races	Wins	Poles	F/Laps	Podiums	Points	Position
2009	SEAT León Supercopa Spain	Team Monlau Competición	6	0	0	0	1	0	NC†
2010	SEAT León Supercopa Spain	Monlau Competición	18	0	0	0	2	77	4th
2010	SEAT León Eurocup	Monlau Competición	12	3	0	1	3	37	4th
2011	World Touring Car Championship	SUNRED Engineering	24	0	0	0	0	11	18th
2011	European Touring Car Cup - Super 2000	SUNRED Engineering	2	1	0	0	2	20	**2nd**
2012	World Touring Car Championship	Tuenti Racing Team	24	0	0	2	2	131	8th
2013	World Touring Car Championship	Tuenti Racing Team	24	1	0	2	4	164	9th
2014	World Touring Car Championship	Campos Racing	0	0	0	0	0	0	NC
2015	TCR International Series	Team Craft-Bamboo Lukoil	22	2	1	4	12	312	**2nd**
2016	TCR International Series	Team Craft-Bamboo Lukoil	21	4	1	3	9	241.5	4th
2017	TCR International Series	Lukoil Craft-Bamboo Racing	20	2	0	3	4	164	4th
2017	TCR BeNeLux Touring Car Championship	Ferry Monster Autosport	3	0	0	0	0	50‡	23rd‡
2018	World Touring Car Cup	Team Oscaro by Campos Racing	30	1	0	2	7	245	6th
2019	TCR Asia Series	Solite Indigo Racing	10	0	0	0	6	156	**3rd**
2019	TCR Spa 500	Red Camel-Jordans.nl	1	1	0	0	1	N/A	**1st**
2020	TCR Europe Touring Car Series	Brutal Fish Racing Team	11	1	0	0	2	153	13th
2020	24H TCE Europe Series - TCR	Brutal Fish Racing Team by KCMG	2	0	0	0	1	16	25th
2021	TCR South America Touring Car Championship	W2 ProGP	14	4	0	6	8	278	**1st**
2022	TCR Europe Touring Car Series	Brutal Fish Racing Team	6	0	0	0	2	185	11th
2022	TCR Europe Touring Car Series	Hyundai N Team Aggressive Italia	7	0	0	0	0	185	11th
2023	TCR Europe Touring Car Series	RC2 Racing Team	2	0	0	0	0	39	19th
2025	TCR World Tour	GOAT Racing	2	0	0	0	0	6	32nd
2025	TCR Australia Touring Car Series	GOAT Racing	2	0	0	0	0	0	NC†
2026	GT Cup Open Europe	GOAT Racing							

† As Oriola was a guest driver, he was ineligible to score points. ‡ Team standings

=== Complete World Touring Car Championship results ===
(key) (Races in bold indicate pole position) (Races in italics indicate fastest lap)

Year	Team	Car	1	2	3	4	5	6	7	8	9	10	11	12	13	14	15	16	17	18	19	20	21	22	23	24	DC	Points
2011	SUNRED Engineering	SEAT León 2.0 TDI	BRA; 1; 13	BRA; 2; 10	BEL; 1; 11	BEL; 2; 14	ITA; 1; 14	ITA; 2; 12																			18th	11
2011	SUNRED Engineering	SUNRED SR León 1.6T							HUN; 1; 10	HUN; 2 Ret	CZE; 1; 13	CZE; 2; 11	POR; 1; 13	POR; 2; 14	GBR; 1; 12	GBR; 2; 15	GER; 1; 8	GER; 2; 12	ESP; 1; 12	ESP; 2; 8	JPN; 1; 18	JPN; 2; 13	CHN; 1; 17	CHN; 2; 13	MAC; 1; 10	MAC; 2; 11	18th	11
2012	Tuenti Racing Team	SEAT León WTCC	ITA; 1; 6	ITA; 2; 12	ESP; 1; 6	ESP; 2; 7	MAR; 1; 4	MAR; 2; 7	SVK; 1; 16†	SVK; 2; 5	HUN; 1; 8	HUN; 2; 4	AUT; 1; 7	AUT; 2; 4	POR; 1; 9	**POR**; **2**; 2	BRA; 1; 16	BRA; 2; 17†	USA; 1; 16†	USA; 2; 11	JPN; 1; 7	JPN; 2; 2	CHN; 1; 22	CHN; 2 Ret	MAC; 1 Ret	MAC; 2; 22†	8th	131
2013	Tuenti Racing Team	SEAT León WTCC	ITA; 1 Ret	ITA; 2; 6	MAR; 1; 8	MAR; 2; 1	SVK; 1; 9	SVK; 2; 6	HUN; 1 Ret	HUN; 2; 16	AUT; 1; 11	AUT; 2; 7	RUS; 1; 17	RUS; 2; 4													9th	164
2013	Tuenti Racing Team	Chevrolet Cruze 1.6T													POR; 1; 4	POR; 2; 4	ARG; 1; 2	ARG; 2; 3	USA; 1; 11	USA; 2; 21†	JPN; 1; 26†	JPN; 2 Ret	CHN; 1; 5	CHN; 2; 7	MAC; 1; 15	MAC; 2; 2	9th	164
2014	Campos Racing	Chevrolet RML Cruze TC1	MAR; 1	MAR; 2	FRA; 1	FRA; 2	HUN; 1	HUN; 2	SVK; 1	SVK; 2	AUT; 1	AUT; 2	RUS; 1	RUS; 2	BEL; 1	BEL; 2	ARG; 1	ARG; 2	BEI; 1	BEI; 2	CHN; 1	CHN; 2	JPN; 1	JPN; 2	MAC; 1 DNS	MAC; 2 DNS	NC	0

^{†} Driver did not finish the race, but was classified as he completed over 75% of the race distance.

=== Complete TCR International Series results ===
(key) (Races in bold indicate pole position) (Races in italics indicate fastest lap)

Year	Team	Car	1	2	3	4	5	6	7	8	9	10	11	12	13	14	15	16	17	18	19	20	21	22	DC	Points
2015	Team Craft-Bamboo Lukoil	SEAT León Cup Racer	SEP; 1; 2	SEP; 2; 2	SHA; 1 Ret	SHA; 2; 4	**VAL**; **1**; 1	VAL; 2; 5	ALG; 1 Ret	ALG; 2; 4	MNZ; 1; 2	MNZ; 2 Ret	SAL; 1; 6	SAL; 2; 2	SOC; 1; 2	SOC; 2; 2	RBR; 1; 3	RBR; 2; 2	MRN; 1; 4	MRN; 2; 3	CHA; 1; 1	CHA; 2; 3	MAC; 1; 4	MAC; 2; 9†	2nd	312
2016	Team Craft-Bamboo Lukoil	SEAT León TCR	BHR; 1; 1	BHR; 2; 1	EST; 1; 8	EST; 2; 10	SPA; 1; 2	SPA; 2; 7	IMO; 1; 2	IMO; 2; 5	SAL; 1; 12†	SAL; 2 DNS	OSC; 1; 10	OSC; 2; 1	SOC; 1; 2	SOC; 2; 13†	**CHA**; **1**; 1	CHA; 2; 11	MRN; 1; 3	MRN; 2; 14	SEP; 1; 4	SEP; 2; 12	MAC; 1; 5	MAC; 2; 3	4th	241.5
2017	Lukoil Craft-Bamboo Racing	SEAT León TCR	RIM; 1; 7	RIM; 2; 1	BHR; 1; 6	BHR; 2; 7	SPA; 1; 9	SPA; 2 Ret	MNZ; 1; 3	MNZ; 2; 8	SAL; 1; 5	SAL; 2 Ret	HUN; 1; 5	HUN; 2; 2	OSC; 1; 18†	OSC; 2 Ret	CHA; 1; 21†	CHA; 2 Ret	ZHE; 1; 5	ZHE; 2; 5	DUB; 1; 1	DUB; 2 Ret			4th	164

^{†} Driver did not finish the race, but was classified as he completed over 90% of the race distance.

=== Complete World Touring Car Cup results ===
(key) (Races in bold indicate pole position) (Races in italics indicate fastest lap)

Year	Team	Car	1	2	3	4	5	6	7	8	9	10	11	12	13	14	15	16	17	18	19	20	21	22	23	24	25	26	27	28	29	30	DC	Points
2018	Team Oscaro by Campos Racing	Cupra León TCR	MAR; 1; 18†	MAR; 2; 3	MAR; 3; 10	HUN; 1; 16	HUN; 2 Ret	HUN; 3; 19	GER; 1; 8	GER; 2; 2	GER; 3; 6	NED; 1; 23†	NED; 2; 4	NED; 3; 10	POR; 1; 3	POR; 2; 3	POR; 3; 4	SVK; 1; 1	SVK; 2; 4	SVK; 3; 8	CHN; 1; 13	CHN; 2; 9	CHN; 3; 7	WUH; 1; 2	WUH; 2; 4	WUH; 3; 6	JPN; 1; 10	JPN; 2; 2	JPN; 3; 19	MAC; 1; 7	MAC; 2 Ret	MAC; 3; 6	6th	245

^{†} Driver did not finish the race, but was classified as he completed over 90% of the race distance.

=== TCR Spa 500 results ===
Year	Team	Co-Drivers	Car	Class	Laps	Pos.	Class Pos.
2019	(Netherlands) Red Camel-Jordans.nl	(Netherlands) Ivo Breukers (Netherlands) Rik Breukers (Netherlands) Tom Coronel	CUPRA León TCR	**P**	454	**1st**	**1st**

=== Complete TCR Europe Touring Car Series results ===
(key) (Races in bold indicate pole position) (Races in italics indicate fastest lap)

Year	Team	Car	1	2	3	4	5	6	7	8	9	10	11	12	13	14	DC	Points
2020	Brutal Fish Racing Team	Honda Civic Type R TCR (FK8)	LEC; 1; 20	LEC; 2; 11	ZOL; 1; 10	ZOL; 2; 7	MNZ; 1 Ret^{5}	MNZ; 2; 1	CAT; 1; 2^{4}	CAT; 2; 13	SPA; 1; 10^{9}	SPA; 2; 11	JAR; 1 Ret	JAR; 2 DNS			13th	153
2022	Brutal Fish Racing Team	Honda Civic Type R TCR (FK8)	ALG; 1; 9	**ALG**; **2**; 2	LEC; 1; 7	LEC; 2; 3	SPA; 1 Ret	SPA; 2; 10									11th	185
2022	Aggressive Italia	Hyundai Elantra N TCR							NOR; 1 Ret	NOR; 2; 12	NÜR; 1; 4	NÜR; 2 C	MNZ; 1; 7	MNZ; 2; 10	CAT; 1; 8	CAT; 2 Ret	11th	185
2023	RC2 Racing Team	Audi RS 3 LMS TCR	ALG; 1	ALG; 2	PAU; 1	PAU; 2	SPA; 1	SPA; 2	HUN; 1	HUN; 2	LEC; 1	LEC; 2	MNZ; 1	MNZ; 2	CAT; 1; 6	CAT; 2; 7	19th	39

=== Complete TCR World Tour results ===
(key) (Races in bold indicate pole position) (Races in italics indicate fastest lap)

Year	Team	Car	1	2	3	4	5	6	7	8	9	10	11	12	13	14	15	16	17	18	19	20	21	DC	Points
2025	GOAT Racing	Honda Civic Type R TCR (FL5)	AHR; 1	AHR; 2	AHR; 3	CRT; 1	CRT; 2	CRT; 3	MNZ; 1	MNZ; 2	CVR; 1	CVR; 2	BEN; 1	BEN; 2	BEN; 3	INJ; 1	INJ; 2	INJ; 3	ZHZ; 1	ZHZ; 2	ZHZ; 3	MAC; 1; 11	MAC; 2 Ret	32nd	6

Sporting positions
Preceded by Inaugural	TCR South America Touring Car Championship; Champion; 2021	Succeeded by Fabricio Pezzini
