= TCR International Series =

International touring car championship

- Category: Touring cars
- Region: International
- Inaugural season: 2015
- Folded: 2017
- Tyre suppliers: Michelin
- Last Drivers' champion: (France) Jean-Karl Vernay
- Last Teams' champion: (Hungary) M1RA

The TCR International Series was an international touring car championship. The championship was promoted by World Sporting Consulting (WSC), founded by former World Touring Car Championship manager Marcello Lotti. It was marketed as a cost-effective spin-off of the WTCC, targeted at C-segment hatchbacks production-based touring cars. The title TCR follows the naming convention now used by the FIA to classify the cars that compete in touring car racing, with TC1 referring to the top tier as used by the FIA WTCC and TC2 referring to the legacy cars which principally compete in the FIA ETCC.

On 6th December 2017, FIA's World Motorsport Council announced that the series will merge with World Touring Car Championship and European Touring Car Cup starting in 2018.

== History ==
On 15 July 2014, Lotti revealed further details on the TCR series. On the same day it was announced that the TCR series will award a Drivers' Championship title and a Teams' Championship title. The number of teams will be limited to eight and the number of competitors to twenty-four. It was also announced that the series will run alongside Formula One at selected events.

On 21 July 2014, more details about the series became available: the race weekend format will be structured like the WTCC, with two free practice sessions and a two part qualifying session, followed by two races on Sunday. The first event would take place in Italy in March, but when a provisional calendar for the 2015 season was released on 31 October, it became clear that the first event will take place at the Sepang International Circuit on 29 March. Lotti confirmed the technical principles of the SEAT León Cup Racer, which is also set to be adopted in the Single-Make Trophy category of the European Touring Car Cup in 2015, will be used by the TCR Series.

On 29 July 2014, former WTCC driver Pepe Oriola said in an interview with TouringCarTimes that he hopes to compete in the new series, because he was set to drive for the Onyx Race Engineering team in the 2014 WTCC season with their new Ford Fiesta TC1 car for the last part of the season, before the project was abandoned with no support for homologation from Ford.

On 15 September 2014, the TCR organisation announced the first cars, teams, regulations and events of its inaugural season in 2015. Target Competition became the first team to confirm entry in the series and will run SEAT León Eurocup cars in 2015. Onyx Race Engineering has also confirmed they are developing the Ford Focus for the championship.
A week later Paolo Coloni Racing announced plans to enter the championship in 2015. Team principal Paolo Coloni, son of F1-team founder Enzo Coloni, is known for its accomplishments in the GP2 Series in 2005 and in 2009 to 2012. The team will confirm at a later date their planned car and driver line-up.

On 31 October 2014, a provisional calendar for its inaugural season was released. It will consist of twelve weekends, four in Asia, five in Europe, two in South America and one to be announced.

On 7 November 2014, the fourth team was announced: the Swedish STCC team WestCoast Racing will join the series with three Honda Civics build by JAS Motorsport. On 20 November Liqui Moly Team Engstler announced they will participate with Volkswagen Golfs and Franz Engstler will be driving one of the VWs.

On 5 December 2014, the series was approved by the FIA and renamed TCR International Series instead of using the original TC3 International Series name.

On 27 January 2015, Marcello Lotti announced three new teams for the inaugural season: Zengő Motorsport, Proteam Racing and Campos Racing. On 13 February Jordi Oriola announced he will be driving a Target Competition SEAT at Valencia and Monza and Mikhail Grachev was confirmed on 17 February at Engstler Motorsport. In the end of February and in March almost half of all the drivers were confirmed, but just one week from the first round in Sepang Onyx Race Engineering, Paolo Coloni Racing and Proteam Racing have not confirmed a single driver. On 20 March the TCR International Series organisation announced the first TV deals for the inaugural season. On 29 May 2015, David Sonenscher announces the TCR Thailand Series, starting from 2016.

== Technical regulations ==
On 15 September 2014, technical regulations for the category were announced. On 22 January 2016, minor changes were applied.

Eligible cars: 4/5-door vehicles
Body shell: Reinforced production body shell; wheel arch modifications allowed to accommodate tyres
Minimum weight: 1250 kg for cars with production gearbox, 1285 kg for cars with racing gearbox (both including the driver)
Minimum overall length: 4.20 metres
Maximum overall width: 1.95 metres
Engine: Turbo-charged petrol or diesel up to 2.0-litre
Torque: 420 Nm
Power: 350 PS
Lubrication: Wet sump
Exhaust: Homologated catalytic converter using production parts
Traction: On two wheels
Gearbox: Production or TCR International Series sequential; production paddle shift accepted
Front Suspension: Production lay-out; parts free design
Rear Suspension: Original design of production car with reinforced components
Brakes:

- Front: max 6 piston calipers, brake discs max diameter 380mm
- Rear: max 2 piston callipers; production ABS accepted

Wheels: Maximum dimensions of rim: 10″ x 18″
Aerodynamics:

- Front splitter: 2014 SEAT León Eurocup
- Rear wing: FIA Appendix J Art. 263 2014
- Ground clearance: Minimum 80 mm
- Power/Weight Ratio: Subject to the Balance of Performance (changing between +70 and −20 kg from the minimum car weight)

== Champions ==
Year	Drivers' Champions			Teams' Champions	
Year	Driver	Team	Car	Team	Car
2015	(Switzerland) Stefano Comini	(Italy) Target Competition	SEAT León Cup Racer	(Italy) Target Competition	SEAT León Cup Racer
2016	(Switzerland) Stefano Comini	(Luxembourg) Leopard Racing	Volkswagen Golf GTI TCR	(Hong Kong) Team Craft-Bamboo Lukoil	SEAT León TCR
2017	(France) Jean-Karl Vernay	(Luxembourg) Leopard Racing Team WRT	Volkswagen Golf GTI TCR	(Hungary) M1RA	Honda Civic Type R TCR

== Scoring system ==
These points have been based on the FIA's points system used in the FIA Formula One Championship.

Position	1st	2nd	3rd	4th	5th	6th	7th	8th	9th	10th
Points	25	18	15	12	10	8	6	4	2	1

== See also ==
- TCR Touring Car
- TCR Model of the Year
- TCR World Tour
- World Touring Car Cup
- World Touring Car Championship
- European Touring Car Championship
- SEAT León Eurocup
