= 2016 Guia Race of Macau =

2016 TCR International Series Macau round
Round details
- Round 11 of 11 rounds in the 2016 TCR International Series
- Layout of the Guia Circuit
- Location: Guia Circuit, Macau, China
- Course: Permanent racing facility 6.200 km (3.800 mi)

TCR International Series

Race 1
- Date: 20 November 2016
- Laps: 5

Pole position
Driver	(France) Jean-Karl Vernay	Leopard Racing
- Time: 3:00.602

Podium
First	(Switzerland) Stefano Comini	Leopard Racing
Second	(France) Jean-Karl Vernay	Leopard Racing
Third	(Portugal) Tiago Monteiro	WestCoast Racing

Fastest lap
Driver	(Hong Kong) Edgar Lau	Asia Racing Team
- Time: 2:57.167 (on lap 5)

Race 2
- Date: 20 November 2016
- Laps: 7

Podium
First	(Portugal) Tiago Monteiro	WestCoast Racing
Second	(France) Jean-Karl Vernay	Leopard Racing
Third	(Spain) Pepe Oriola	Team Craft-Bamboo Lukoil

Fastest lap
Driver	(Spain) Pepe Oriola	Team Craft-Bamboo Lukoil
- Time: 2:35.494 (on lap 7)

The 2016 Guia Race of Macau was the eleventh and final round of the 2016 TCR International Series season as well as the fifth and final round of the 2016 TCR Asia Series season. It took place on 20 November at the Guia Circuit.

Stefano Comini won the first race, driving a Volkswagen Golf GTI TCR and Tiago Monteiro gained the second one, driving a Honda Civic TCR.

== Success Ballast ==
Due to the results obtained in the previous round, James Nash received +30 kg, Roberto Colciago +20 kg and Kevin Gleason +10 kg. Nevertheless, Colciago and Gleason did not take part at this event, so they did not take the ballast.

In addition, the Balance of Performance was reviewed for this round: all TCR cars were given a 20 kg weight break, bringing them back to their base weights. This was applied in an attempt to balance them with the CTCC cars entered for the event.

== Classification ==
=== Qualifying ===
Pos.	No.	Driver	Car	Team	Q1	Q2	Grid	Points
1	2	(France) Jean-Karl Vernay	Volkswagen Golf GTI TCR	(Luxembourg) Leopard Racing	2:34.121	3:00.602	1	5
2	1	(Switzerland) Stefano Comini	Volkswagen Golf GTI TCR	(Luxembourg) Leopard Racing	2:34.738	3:01.093	2	4
3	81	(Portugal) Tiago Monteiro	Honda Civic TCR	(Sweden) WestCoast Racing	2:34.217	3:02.604	3	3
4	48	(Finland) Antti Buri	SEAT León Cup Racer	(Finland) LMS Racing	2:35.916	3:04.393	4	2
5	62	(Serbia) Dušan Borković	SEAT León TCR	B3 Racing Team Hungary	2:34.415	3:04.442	5	1
6	10	(Italy) Gianni Morbidelli	Honda Civic TCR	(Sweden) WestCoast Racing	2:36.828	3:04.723	6	
7	54	(United Kingdom) James Nash	SEAT León TCR	(United Kingdom) Team Craft-Bamboo Lukoil	2:34.456	3:05.033	7	
8	77	(Russia) Sergey Afanasyev	SEAT León TCR	(United Kingdom) Team Craft-Bamboo Lukoil	2:34.821	3:05.264	8	
9	70	(Slovakia) Maťo Homola	SEAT León TCR	B3 Racing Team Hungary	2:34.814	3:05.348	9	
10	74	(Spain) Pepe Oriola	SEAT León TCR	(United Kingdom) Team Craft-Bamboo Lukoil	2:33.480	3:05.396	10	
11	50	(United Kingdom) Josh Files	Honda Civic TCR	(Italy) Target Competition	2:34.700	3:06.428	11	
12	9	(Hungary) Attila Tassi	SEAT León TCR	B3 Racing Team Hungary	2:34.892	3:07.100	12	
13	3	(Hong Kong) Andy Yan	Volkswagen Golf GTI TCR	(Germany) Liqui Moly Team Engstler	2:36.973		13	
14	7	(Georgia (country)) Davit Kajaia	Volkswagen Golf GTI TCR	(Germany) Liqui Moly Team Engstler	2:37.955		14	
15	12	(Hong Kong) Sunny Wong	Citroen C-Elysée	(Hong Kong) Suncity Racing Team	2:38.449		15	
16	11	(Hong Kong) Alex Hui	Citroen C-Elysée	(Hong Kong) Suncity Racing Team	2:38.783		16	
17	33	(China) Jiang Teng Yi	Audi A3 Saloon	(China) Linky Racing Team	2:39.848		17	
18	68	(Hong Kong) Tang Chi Lun	Honda Civic TCR	(Hong Kong) Team TRC	2:39.977		18	
19	11	(China) Zhang Ya Qi	Audi A3 Saloon	(China) Linky Racing Team	2:40.692		19	
20	83	(Thailand) Tin Sritrai	Honda Civic TCR	Team Thailand	2:41.393		20	
21	22	(Czech Republic) Petr Fulín	Alfa Romeo Giulietta TCR	(Italy) Mulsanne Racing	2:41.686		21	
22	97	(Hong Kong) Edgar Lau	SEAT León Cup Racer	(Macau) Asia Racing Team	2:41.785		22	
23	14	(China) Neric Wei	Volkswagen Golf GTI TCR	(Macau) Son Veng Racing Team	2:42.557		23	
24	35	(France) Rafaël Galiana	SEAT León TCR	(Italy) Target Competition	2:44.247		26^{1}	
25	23	(Italy) Andrea Belicchi	Alfa Romeo Giulietta TCR	(Italy) Mulsanne Racing	2:45.204		28^{1}	
26	87	(Macau) Lou Hon Kei	SEAT León Cup Racer	(Macau) Elegant Racing Team	2:45.292		27^{1}	
27	28	(Macau) Kevin Tse	Volkswagen Golf GTI TCR	(Hong Kong) TeamWork Motorsport	2:48.332		24^{1}	
28	99	(Hong Kong) William Lok	Mercedes-Benz C260	(China) Star Racing Team	2:49.002		DNQ^{2}	
29	17	(Hong Kong) Terence Tse	SEAT León Cup Racer	(Hong Kong) Roadstar Racing	2:50.102		DNQ^{2}	
30	27	(Hong Kong) William O'Brien	Volkswagen Golf GTI TCR	(Hong Kong) TeamWork Motorsport	2:51.754		DNQ^{2}	
31	78	(Hong Kong) Kenneth Ma	Ford Focus TCR	(Hong Kong) FRD Motorsports	2:53.859		DNQ^{2}	
32	65	(Malaysia) Douglas Khoo	SEAT León Cup Racer	(Malaysia) Viper Niza Racing	3:01.228		DNQ^{2}	
33	25	(Russia) Mikhail Grachev	Honda Civic TCR	(Sweden) WestCoast Racing	No time		25^{1}	
34	6	(Spain) Jordi Oriola	Volkswagen Golf GTI TCR	(Germany) Liqui Moly Team Engstler	withdrew			
35	38	(Macau) Michael Ho	Honda Civic TCR	(China) Champ Motorsport	withdrew			
36	4	(United Kingdom) Adam Morgan	Mercedes-Benz C260	(China) Star Racing Team	withdrew			

Notes:

- ^1 – Rafaël Galiana, Andrea Belicchi, Lou Hon Kei, Kevin Tse and Mikhail Grachev were moved to the back of the grid for having not set a time within the 107% limit. The grid order was decided by the free practice combined classification.
- ^2 – William Lok, Terence Tse, William O'Brien, Kenneth Ma and Douglas Khoo failed to set a lap time within 107% of the fastest time during the weekend. As a result, these drivers failed to qualify for the race.

=== Race 1 ===
Pos.	No.	Driver	Car	Team	Laps	Time/Retired	Grid	Points
1	1	(Switzerland) Stefano Comini	Volkswagen Golf GTI TCR	(Luxembourg) Leopard Racing	5	37:08.900	2	12.5
2	2	(France) Jean-Karl Vernay	Volkswagen Golf GTI TCR	(Luxembourg) Leopard Racing	5	+1.040	1	9
3	81	(Portugal) Tiago Monteiro	Honda Civic TCR	(Sweden) WestCoast Racing	5	+1.467	3	7.5
4	62	(Serbia) Dušan Borković	SEAT León TCR	B3 Racing Team Hungary	5	+1.844	5	6
5	74	(Spain) Pepe Oriola	SEAT León TCR	(United Kingdom) Team Craft-Bamboo Lukoil	5	+2.192	10	5
6	11	(Hong Kong) Alex Hui	Citroen C-Elysée	(Hong Kong) Suncity Racing Team	5	+2.704	16	
7	83	(Thailand) Tin Sritrai	Honda Civic TCR	Team Thailand	5	+3.253	20	4
8	23	(Italy) Andrea Belicchi	Alfa Romeo Giulietta TCR	(Italy) Mulsanne Racing	5	+3.933	28	3
9	97	(Hong Kong) Edgar Lau	SEAT León Cup Racer	(Macau) Asia Racing Team	5	+6.135	22	
10	35	(France) Rafaël Galiana	SEAT León TCR	(Italy) Target Competition	5	+14.443	26	2
11	8	(Russia) Mikhail Grachev	Honda Civic TCR	(Sweden) WestCoast Racing	5	+15.238	25	1
12	14	(China) Neric Wei	Volkswagen Golf GTI TCR	(Macau) Son Veng Racing Team	5	+16.564	23	
13	33	(China) Jiang Teng Yi	Audi A3 Saloon	(China) Linky Racing Team	5	+16.655	17	
14	50	(United Kingdom) Josh Files	Honda Civic TCR	(Italy) Target Competition	5	+17.230	11	0.5
15	7	(Georgia (country)) Davit Kajaia	Volkswagen Golf GTI TCR	(Germany) Liqui Moly Team Engstler	5	+18.341	14	
16	20	(Macau) Lou Hon Kei	SEAT León Cup Racer	(Macau) Elegant Racing Team	5	+22.496	27	
17	28	(Macau) Kevin Tse	Volkswagen Golf GTI TCR	(Hong Kong) TeamWork Motorsport	5	+48.171	24	
18	54	(United Kingdom) James Nash	SEAT León TCR	(United Kingdom) Team Craft-Bamboo Lukoil	4	Suspension	7	
19	3	(Hong Kong) Andy Yan	Volkswagen Golf GTI TCR	(Germany) Liqui Moly Team Engstler	4	Collision	13	
20	9	(Hungary) Attila Tassi	SEAT León TCR	B3 Racing Team Hungary	4	Collision	12	
21	21	(China) Zhang Ya Qi	Audi A3 Saloon	(China) Linky Racing Team	4	Collision	19	
22	12	(Hong Kong) Sunny Wong	Citroen C-Elysée	(Hong Kong) Suncity Racing Team	4	Accident	15	
23	48	(Finland) Antti Buri	SEAT León TCR	(Finland) LMS Racing	4	Collision	4	
Ret	70	(Slovakia) Maťo Homola	SEAT León TCR	B3 Racing Team Hungary	3	Collision	9	
Ret	22	(Czech Republic) Petr Fulín	Alfa Romeo Giulietta TCR	(Italy) Mulsanne Racing	3	Technical	21	
Ret	77	(Russia) Sergey Afanasyev	SEAT León TCR	(United Kingdom) Team Craft-Bamboo Lukoil	1	Technical	8	
Ret	10	(Italy) Gianni Morbidelli	Honda Civic TCR	(Sweden) WestCoast Racing	0	Collision	6	
Ret	68	(Hong Kong) Tang Chi Lun	Honda Civic TCR	(Hong Kong) Team TRC	0	Accident	18	
DNQ	99	(Hong Kong) William Lok	Mercedes-Benz C260	(China) Star Racing Team		Did not qualify		
DNQ	17	(Hong Kong) Terence Tse	SEAT León Cup Racer	(Hong Kong) Roadstar Racing		Did not qualify		
DNQ	27	(Hong Kong) William O'Brien	Volkswagen Golf GTI TCR	(Hong Kong) TeamWork Motorsport		Did not qualify		
DNQ	78	(Hong Kong) Kenneth Ma	Ford Focus TCR	(Hong Kong) FRD Motorsports		Did not qualify		
DNQ	65	(Malaysia) Douglas Khoo	SEAT León TCR	(Malaysia) Viper Niza Racing		Did not qualify		
WD	6	(Spain) Jordi Oriola	Volkswagen Golf GTI TCR	(Germany) Liqui Moly Team Engstler		Withdrew		
WD	38	(Macau) Michael Ho	Honda Civic TCR	(China) Champ Motorsport		Withdrew		
WD	4	(United Kingdom) Adam Morgan	Mercedes-Benz C260	(China) Star Racing Team		Withdrew		

=== Race 2 ===
Pos.	No.	Driver	Car	Team	Laps	Time/Retired	Grid	Points
1	81	(Portugal) Tiago Monteiro	Honda Civic TCR	(Sweden) WestCoast Racing	7	45:38.635	3	12.5
2	2	(France) Jean-Karl Vernay	Volkswagen Golf GTI TCR	(Luxembourg) Leopard Racing	7	+0.926	2	9
3	74	(Spain) Pepe Oriola	SEAT León TCR	(United Kingdom) Team Craft-Bamboo Lukoil	7	+1.441	5	7.5
4	1	(Switzerland) Stefano Comini	Volkswagen Golf GTI TCR	(Luxembourg) Leopard Racing	7	+2.594	1	6
5	62	(Serbia) Dušan Borković	SEAT León TCR	B3 Racing Team Hungary	7	+3.077	4	5
6	50	(United Kingdom) Josh Files	Honda Civic TCR	(Italy) Target Competition	7	+3.499	14	4
7	8	(Russia) Mikhail Grachev	Honda Civic TCR	(Sweden) WestCoast Racing	7	+9.742	11	3
8	54	(United Kingdom) James Nash	SEAT León TCR	(United Kingdom) Team Craft-Bamboo Lukoil	7	+9.965	18	2
9	23	(Italy) Andrea Belicchi	Alfa Romeo Giulietta TCR	(Italy) Mulsanne Racing	7	+10.473	8	1
10	3	(Hong Kong) Andy Yan	Volkswagen Golf GTI TCR	(Germany) Liqui Moly Team Engstler	7	+11.179	19	0.5
11	33	(China) Jiang Teng Yi	Audi A3 Saloon	(China) Linky Racing Team	7	+11.834	13	
12	83	(Thailand) Tin Sritrai	Honda Civic TCR	Team Thailand	7	+15.484	7	
13	97	(Hong Kong) Edgar Lau	SEAT León Cup Racer	(Macau) Asia Racing Team	7	+21.143	9	
14	35	(France) Rafaël Galiana	SEAT León TCR	(Italy) Target Competition	7	+21.404	10	
15	7	(Georgia (country)) Davit Kajaia	Volkswagen Golf GTI TCR	(Germany) Liqui Moly Team Engstler	7	+21.751	15	
16	14	(China) Neric Wei	Volkswagen Golf GTI TCR	(Macau) Son Veng Racing Team	7	+23.092	12	
Ret	28	(Macau) Kevin Tse	Volkswagen Golf GTI TCR	(Hong Kong) TeamWork Motorsport	4	Collision	17	
Ret	21	(China) Zhang Ya Qi	Audi A3 Saloon	(China) Linky Racing Team	4	Accident	21	
Ret	20	(Macau) Lou Hon Kei	SEAT León Cup Racer	(Macau) Elegant Racing Team	4	Accident	16	
Ret	12	(Hong Kong) Sunny Wong	Citroen C-Elysée	(Hong Kong) Suncity Racing Team	2	Collision	22	
Ret	9	(Hungary) Attila Tassi	SEAT León TCR	B3 Racing Team Hungary	2	Collision	20	
Ret	48	(Finland) Antti Buri	SEAT León TCR	(Finland) LMS Racing	1	Collision	23	
Ret	11	(Hong Kong) Alex Hui	Citroen C-Elysée	(Hong Kong) Suncity Racing Team	0	Technical	6	
DNS	70	(Slovakia) Maťo Homola	SEAT León TCR	B3 Racing Team Hungary	0	Collision	24	
DNS	22	(Czech Republic) Petr Fulín	Alfa Romeo Giulietta TCR	(Italy) Mulsanne Racing	0	Technical	25	
DNS	77	(Russia) Sergey Afanasyev	SEAT León TCR	(United Kingdom) Team Craft-Bamboo Lukoil	0	Technical	26	
DNS	10	(Italy) Gianni Morbidelli	Honda Civic TCR	(Sweden) WestCoast Racing	0	Collision	27	
DNS	68	(Hong Kong) Tang Chi Lun	Honda Civic TCR	(Hong Kong) Team TRC	0	Accident	28	
DNQ	99	(Hong Kong) William Lok	Mercedes-Benz C260	(China) Star Racing Team		Did not qualify		
DNQ	17	(Hong Kong) Terence Tse	SEAT León Cup Racer	(Hong Kong) Roadstar Racing		Did not qualify		
DNQ	27	(Hong Kong) William O'Brien	Volkswagen Golf GTI TCR	(Hong Kong) TeamWork Motorsport		Did not qualify		
DNQ	78	(Hong Kong) Kenneth Ma	Ford Focus TCR	(Hong Kong) FRD Motorsports		Did not qualify		
DNQ	65	(Malaysia) Douglas Khoo	SEAT León TCR	(Malaysia) Viper Niza Racing		Did not qualify		
WD	6	(Spain) Jordi Oriola	Volkswagen Golf GTI TCR	(Germany) Liqui Moly Team Engstler		Withdrew		
WD	38	(Macau) Michael Ho	Honda Civic TCR	(China) Champ Motorsport		Withdrew		
WD	4	(United Kingdom) Adam Morgan	Mercedes-Benz C260	(China) Star Racing Team		Withdrew		

== Standings after the event ==
Drivers' Championship standings

	Pos	Driver	Points
1	1	(Switzerland) Stefano Comini	267.5
1	2	(United Kingdom) James Nash	264
1	3	(France) Jean-Karl Vernay	246
1	4	(Spain) Pepe Oriola	241.5
	5	(Slovakia) Maťo Homola	175

Model of the Year standings

Pos	Car	Points
1	SEAT León	745.5
2	Volkswagen Golf GTI TCR	639.5
3	Honda Civic TCR	589
4	Alfa Romeo Giulietta TCR	93
5	Opel Astra TCR	30

Teams' Championship standings

Pos	Driver	Points
1	(United Kingdom) Team Craft-Bamboo Lukoil	594.5
2	(Luxembourg) Leopard Racing	521.5
3	(Sweden) WestCoast Racing	466
4	B3 Racing Team Hungary	446
5	(Germany) Liqui Moly Team Engstler	129.5

- Note: Only the top five positions are included for both sets of drivers' standings.

== See also ==
- 2016 Macau Grand Prix
- 2016 FIA GT World Cup
