= 2017 China Touring Car Championship =

The 2017 China Touring Car Championship, also known for sponsorship reasons as the 2017 Sinopec Lubricants China Touring Car Championship, is the ninth season of the China Touring Car Championship. In the Super Cup class, Zhang Zhendong entered the season as defending champion, with Changan Ford Racing Team defending manufacturers' champions. In the China Production class, Yang Xi entered the season as defending champion, with Beijing Hyundai Modern Aspect Racing Team defending the manufacturers' championship.

== Teams and drivers ==
=== Super Cup ===
Kumho Tire is the official supplier

Team	Car	No.	Driver	Round
(China) Shanghai Volkswagen 333 Racing Team	Volkswagen Lamando GTS	1	(China) Zhang Zhendong	1–7
(China) Shanghai Volkswagen 333 Racing Team	Volkswagen Lamando GTS	7	(China) Jiang Tengyi	1–7
(China) Shanghai Volkswagen 333 Racing Team	Volkswagen Lamando GTS	8	(China) Wang Rue	1–4
(China) Shanghai Volkswagen 333 Racing Team	Volkswagen Lamando GTS	9	(Macau) Rodolfo Avila	1–7
(China) Shanghai Volkswagen 333 Racing Team	Volkswagen Lamando GTS	12	(United Kingdom) Robert Huff	5–7
(Hong Kong) Changan Ford Racing Team	Ford Focus 2.0T	2	(China) Martin Cao	1–7
(Hong Kong) Changan Ford Racing Team	Ford Focus 2.0T	3	(Hong Kong) Andy Yan	1–7
(Hong Kong) Changan Ford Racing Team	Ford Focus 2.0T	4	(China) Rainey He	1–7
(Hong Kong) Changan Ford Racing Team	Ford Focus 2.0T	5	(United Kingdom) Daniel Lloyd	1
(Hong Kong) Changan Ford Racing Team	Ford Focus 2.0T	19	(China) Zhang Dasheng	6–7
(Hong Kong) Changan Ford Racing Team	Ford Focus 2.0T	54	(United Kingdom) James Nash	2–3, 5
(China) BAIC Motor Beijing Senova Racing Team	Senova CC	5	(United Kingdom) Daniel Lloyd	3, 6
(China) BAIC Motor Beijing Senova Racing Team	Senova CC	97	(Hong Kong) Darryl O'Young	1–2, 4–5, 7
(China) BAIC Motor Beijing Senova Racing Team	Senova CC	98	(China) David Zhu	1–7
(China) BAIC Motor Beijing Senova Racing Team	Senova CC	99	(China) Juan Carlos Zhu	1–7
(China) Haima Strong Power Team	Haima M6	11	(China) Xu Chen	1–6
(China) Haima Strong Power Team	Haima M6	22	(China) Zixian He	1–7
(China) Haima Strong Power Team	Haima M6	23	(China) Kwai Wah Wong	7
(China) Haima Strong Power Team	Haima M6	26	(Sweden) Tomas Engström	1–3
(China) Haima Strong Power Team	Haima M6	47	(China) Andy Zheng	4–5
(China) Dongfeng Yueda Kia Racing Team	Kia K3 2.0T	33	(China) Ye Hongli	2, 5–7
(China) Dongfeng Yueda Kia Racing Team	Kia K3 2.0T	47	(China) Andy Zheng	1
(China) Dongfeng Yueda Kia Racing Team	Kia K3 2.0T	55	(China) Xinzhe Xie	1–4, 7
(China) Dongfeng Yueda Kia Racing Team	Kia K3 2.0T	66	(China) Jason Zhang	1–7
(China) Dongfeng Yueda Kia Racing Team	Kia K3 2.0T	77	(Switzerland) Alex Fontana	2, 5–6
(China) Dongfeng Yueda Kia Racing Team	Kia K3 2.0T	88	(Hong Kong) Jim Ka To	1, 3–7
(China) Chuang Chi Blue Sky Ruisi Think Team	Mazda Atenza	59	(China) Chao Chen	1–6

=== China Production ===
All teams and drivers are Chinese Registered.

Team	Car	No.	Driver	Round
Beijing Hyundai Modern Aspect Racing Team Zongheng Racing Team	Hyundai Verna	1	Xi Yang	1–5
Beijing Hyundai Modern Aspect Racing Team Zongheng Racing Team	Hyundai Verna	2	Zifang Lu	1–5
Beijing Hyundai Modern Aspect Racing Team Zongheng Racing Team	Hyundai Verna	3	Zhou Wu	1–5
Beijing Hyundai Modern Aspect Racing Team Zongheng Racing Team	Hyundai Verna	4	Bian Jin	1–5
Beijing Natie - Star Road Team	Volkswagen New Polo	5	Jincun Wan	1–5
Beijing Natie - Star Road Team	Volkswagen New Polo	6	Zheng Wang	1–5
GTMC Guangzhou Toyota Team	Toyota Yaris L Zhixuan	7	Lifeng Lin	1–5
GTMC Guangzhou Toyota Team	Toyota Yaris L Zhixuan	8	Yang Liu	1–5
GTMC Guangzhou Toyota Team	Toyota Yaris L Zhixuan	9	Baowei Deng	1–5
GTMC Guangzhou Toyota Team	Toyota Yaris L Zhixuan	10	Hanbiao Zhang	1–5
Beijing Ruisi Team	Mazda Axela	11	Liang Dong	2–3, 5
Beijing Ruisi Team	Mazda Axela	33	Xiaowen Deng	1–5
Beijing Ruisi Team	Mazda Axela	77	Zeyu He	1
Beijing Ruisi Team	Mazda Axela	95	Yifenng Liu	4
Eyee Bee Waves Team	Suzuki Swift	17	Xiaowei Yang	1–5
Eyee Bee Waves Team	Suzuki Swift	66	Zhenyu Zhu	1–3
Eyee Bee Waves Team	Suzuki Swift	92	Kaizhou Chen	4–5
FAW Toyota Vios FS Team	Toyota Vios FS	18	Yu Xia	1–5
FAW Toyota Vios FS Team	Toyota Vios FS	19	Chao Sun	1–5
FAW Toyota Vios FS Team	Toyota Vios FS	20	Huayang Gao	1–3
FAW Toyota Vios FS Team	Toyota Vios FS	21	Yue Cui	1, 3–5
FAW Toyota Vios FS Team	Toyota Vios FS	22	Gaoxiang Fan	2
FAW Toyota Vios FS Team	Toyota Vios FS	66	Zhenyu Zhu	4–5
I Think Racing Team	MG 3	23	Anning Sun	2
I Think Racing Team	MG 3	83	Lixin Peng	5
I Think Racing Team	MG 3	85	Yaqi Zhang	3–4
I Think Racing Team	MG 3	86	Dong Liang	1–5
I Think Racing Team	MG 3	87	Hongyu Cai	1
Leo109 Racing Team	Honda Fit	88	Xiaofeng Wu	1–5
Leo109 Racing Team	Honda Fit	99	Lin Li	1–5

== Calendar and results ==
=== Super Cup ===
Rnd.		Circuit	Date	Pole position	Fastest lap	Winner	Winning team
1	1	Zhuhai International Circuit, Zhuhai	14 May	(China) Wang Rue	(China) Wang Rue	(China) Wang Rue	(China) Shanghai Volkswagen 333 Racing Team
1	2	Zhuhai International Circuit, Zhuhai	14 May		(China) Zixian He	(China) Zixian He	(China) Haima Strong Power Team
2	1	Guangdong International Circuit, Zhaoqing	4 June	(Switzerland) Alex Fontana	(China) Jason Zhang	(China) Jason Zhang	(China) Dongfeng Yueda Kia Racing Team
2	2	Guangdong International Circuit, Zhaoqing	4 June		(China) Jiang Tengyi	(United Kingdom) James Nash	(Hong Kong) Changan Ford Racing Team
3	1	Guizhou Junchi International Circuit, Guiyang	25 June	(Hong Kong) Jim Ka To	(United Kingdom) Daniel Lloyd	(Hong Kong) Jim Ka To	(China) Dongfeng Yueda Kia Racing Team
3	2	Guizhou Junchi International Circuit, Guiyang	25 June		(China) Martin Cao	(China) Martin Cao	(Hong Kong) Changan Ford Racing Team
4	1	Shanghai Tianma Circuit, Shanghai	9 July	(China) Zhang Zhendong	(China) Xu Chen	(China) Zhang Zhendong	(China) Shanghai Volkswagen 333 Racing Team
4	2	Shanghai Tianma Circuit, Shanghai	9 July		(China) Juan Carlos Zhu	(China) Juan Carlos Zhu	(China) BAIC Motor Beijing Senova Racing Team
5	1	Shanghai International Circuit, Shanghai	6 August	(United Kingdom) Robert Huff	(China) David Zhu	(United Kingdom) Robert Huff	(China) Shanghai Volkswagen 333 Racing Team
5	2	Shanghai International Circuit, Shanghai	6 August		(China) David Zhu	(Hong Kong) Jim Ka To	(China) Dongfeng Yueda Kia Racing Team
6	1	Ningbo International Circuit, Zhejiang	15 October	(United Kingdom) Robert Huff	(United Kingdom) Daniel Lloyd	(United Kingdom) Robert Huff	(China) Shanghai Volkswagen 333 Racing Team
6	2	Ningbo International Circuit, Zhejiang	15 October		(United Kingdom) Daniel Lloyd	(Switzerland) Alex Fontana	(China) Dongfeng Yueda Kia Racing Team
7	1	Wuhan Street Circuit, Wuhan	12 November	(United Kingdom) Robert Huff	(China) Ye Hongli	(United Kingdom) Robert Huff	(China) Shanghai Volkswagen 333 Racing Team
7	2	Wuhan Street Circuit, Wuhan	12 November		(China) Zhang Zhendong	(China) Zhang Zhendong	(China) Shanghai Volkswagen 333 Racing Team
8	1	Shanghai International Circuit, Shanghai	26 November				
8	2	Shanghai International Circuit, Shanghai	26 November				
