= Linky Racing =

Chinese auto racing team

(China) Linky Racing
- Founded: 2014
- Team principal(s): Yue Pan
- Current series: TCR International Series; TCR China Series; China GT Championship; China Touring Car Championship
- Noted drivers: TCR; 71. Tengyi Jiang; 81. Zhendong Zhang; TCR China; 66. Cai Hong Yu; China GT; 7. Xu Jia; 8. (Estonia) Martin Rump; 8. Han Huilin; 8. Wang Liang; 10. Jiang Shiling; 10. Li Huan; 17. (Japan) Naoki Yokomizo; 17. Xu Wei; CTCC; 23. Anning Sun; 83. Lixin Peng; 85. Yaqi Zhang; 86. Dong Liang; 87. Hongyu Cai
- Teams' Championships: 2017
- Drivers' Championships: 2017 (Xu Jia)

Linky Racing is a Chinese auto racing team based in Shaoxing, China. The team has raced in the TCR International Series, since 2017. The team also races in the TCR China Touring Car Championship, China GT Championship and China Touring Car Championship amongst others.

== China Touring Car Championship ==
The team entered the China Touring Car Championship for first time in 2016, entering the series with a pair of Audi S3 Saloons in the Super Production 2.0T class as well as entering a pair of MG 3s in the China Production class under the I Think Racing Team banner. The team also entered the 2016 Guia Race of Macau with Zhang Ya Qi and Jiang Tengyi, driving the two Audis. With the team returning for a full season in 2017, this time only entering a pair of MG 3s for the now-renamed China Cup class.

== China GT Championship ==
Entering the inaugural season of the championship in 2017. The team entered two Audi R8 LMS one for Xu Jia, while Martin Rump, Han Huilin and Wang Liang shared the second one. They also entered a Ferrari 488 GT3 for Naoki Yokomizo and Xu Wei and a Lamborghini Huracán Super Trofeo for Jiang Shiling and Li Huan. All cars were run under the KINGS banner. Xu Jia eventually won the drivers title while the team secured the teams title.

== TCR China Touring Car Championship ==
The team entered the inaugural season of the championship in 2017, running a single Audi RS 3 LMS TCR for CTCC regular driver Cai Hong Yu. Cai was partnered by Zhang Ya Qi for the first round of the championship, for the second round he was partnered by Bai Ya Xin. Cai was entered as the team's sole driver for the third round of the championship.

== TCR International Series ==
=== Audi RS 3 LMS TCR (2017–) ===
After having raced in the TCR China Touring Car Championship, the team entered the 2017 TCR International Series with Tengyi Jiang and Zhendong Zhang driving an Audi RS 3 LMS TCR each, with both cars entered under ZZZ Team banner. With Zhang the only one of the two taking a points scoring position, a seventh-place finish in the second race held at Zhejiang.
