= 2016 FIA GT World Cup =

GT race held at Macau in 2016

Race details
Date	20 November 2016
Official name	SJM Macau GT Cup – FIA GT World Cup
Location	Guia Circuit, Macau
Course	Temporary street circuit 6.120 km (3.803 mi)
Distance	Qualifying Race; 12 laps, 61.200 km (38.028 mi); Main Race; 4 laps, 24.800 km (15.410 mi)
- Qualifying Race

Pole
Driver	(Italy) Edoardo Mortara	Audi Sport Team WRT
Time	2:16.862

Fastest lap
Driver	(Belgium) Laurens Vanthoor	Audi Sport Team WRT
Time	2:18.031 (on lap 11)

Podium
First	(Belgium) Laurens Vanthoor	Audi Sport Team WRT
Second	(New Zealand) Earl Bamber	Manthey Racing
Third	(France) Kévin Estre	Manthey Racing
- Main Race

Pole
Driver	(Belgium) Laurens Vanthoor	Audi Sport Team WRT

Fastest lap
Driver	(France) Kévin Estre	Manthey Racing
Time	2:28.995 (on lap 2)

Podium
First	(Belgium) Laurens Vanthoor	Audi Sport Team WRT
Third	(France) Kévin Estre	Manthey Racing
Third	(Germany) Maro Engel	(Germany) Mercedes-AMG Driving Academy

The 2016 FIA GT World Cup (officially the SJM Macau GT Cup – FIA GT World Cup) was a Grand Touring (GT) sports car race held on the streets of the autonomous territory of Macau on 20 November 2016. It was the event's second annual edition, and the ninth time GT3-specified machinery had participated in Macau. Unlike the 2015 race, it was not run as a non-championship GT Asia Series race. The Automobile General Association Macau-China appointed motorsports organiser Stéphane Ratel Organisation (SRO) to help form a grid. The race itself consisted of two races: a twelve-lap qualification race that determined the starting grid for the four-lap main race.

Laurens Vanthoor of Audi Sport Team WRT won the main race in a R8 LMS from pole position after winning the event's Qualification Race the day before. Vanthoor passed his teammate Edoardo Mortara on the rolling start and went on to win the qualifying race. Vanthoor led the first four laps of the main race before being passed by Earl Bamber in a Manthey Racing-entered Porsche 911 GT3 R at the start of lap five. After hitting a barrier, Vanthoor went airborne and landed on the roof of his car, thereby ending the race. Vanthoor was named the winner after the results were counted back to the conclusion of lap four. Manthey Racing's Kévin Estre finished second, and Mercedes-AMG Driving Academy's Maro Engel completed the podium in third.

== Background and entry list ==
At an FIA World Motor Sport Council meeting on 4 March 2016, the 2016 FIA GT World Cup was confirmed, and the FIA immediately opened the tender for the race's official tyre and fuel providers. It was the event's second running and the ninth annual Grand Touring car race in Macau. The FIA GT World Cup was held at the 6.2 km (3.9 mi) 22-turn Guia Circuit on 20 November, following three days of practice and qualifying. For the 2016 event, the FIA changed the regulations for how manufacturers could win the FIA GT World Cup for Manufacturers Championship. The 2015 race's points system was abandoned in favour of awarding the prize to the top overall manufacturer at the end of the main race. Stéphane Ratel, the founder of the motorsports organisation Stéphane Ratel Organisation, said that the changes were made to simplify the race, "It doesn't make sense to have points for a one-off event. The manufacturer that wins gets both titles." Pirelli was the race's official tyre supplier.

To compete in the FIA GT World Cup in Macau, drivers had to have competed in a Fédération Internationale de l'Automobile (FIA)-regulated championship race based on GT3 regulations in the preceding two seasons or have extensive experience in Grand Touring cars. Manufacturers could enter up to two drivers and were limited to platinum-rated drivers; gold-rated entrants could only race with privateers. Bronze and silver-rated entrants were considered on a case-by-case basis by the FIA GT World Cup Committee. The race's entry list was released on 6 October. The final entry list included 23 drivers from the Blancpain Endurance Series, the FIA World Endurance Championship, the GT Asia Series, the Deutsche Tourenwagen Masters (DTM), the Super GT and the Porsche Carrera Cup. Drivers such as the 2015 winner Maro Engel, 2015 24 Hours of Le Mans co-winner Earl Bamber, DTM driver Edoardo Mortara, 2000 Macau Grand Prix victor André Couto and 2013 FIA GT Series champion Laurens Vanthoor raced.

== Practice and qualifying ==
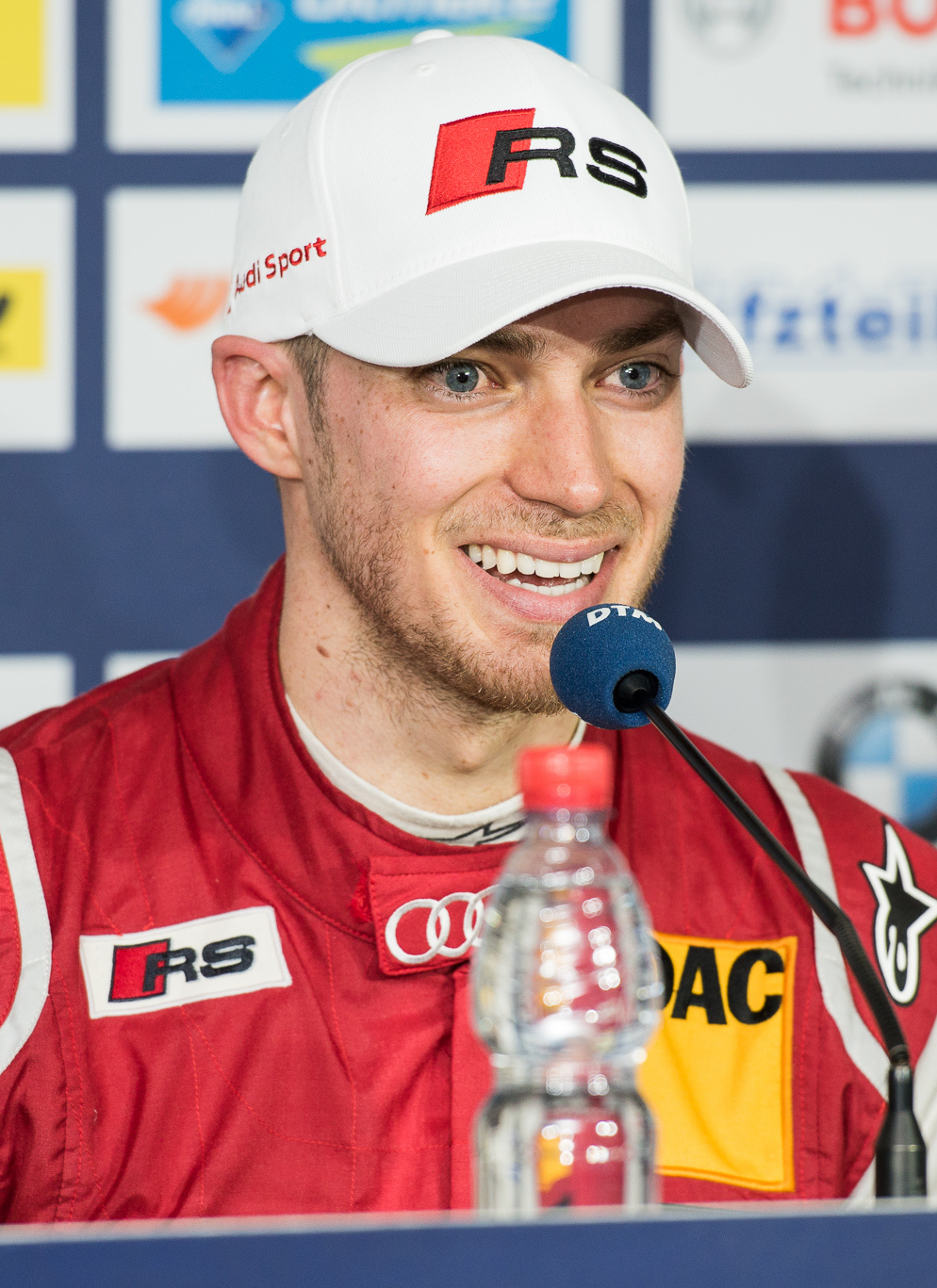
Edoardo Mortara (pictured in 2014) set a new GT3 lap record of the Guia Circuit and took the pole position for the qualifying race.

There was one half an hour practice session each on Thursday afternoon and Friday morning preceding Sunday's race. In the first practice session, Bamber lapped the No. 911 Manthey Racing Porsche 911 GT3 R in 2:19.253, more than two-tenths of a second faster than anyone else. Mortara's No. 7 Audi Sport Team WRT R8 LMS was second, and Vanthoor in the sister No. 8 vehicle was third. Fourth was Kévin Estre's No. 912 Manthey Porsche, and fifth was Richard Lyons' No. 991 Craft-Bamboo Racing car, the highest-placed privateer. Rounding out the top ten were Engel, Darryl O'Young, Nico Müller, Renger van der Zande and Adderly Fong. When Fong made an error and crashed his Bentley Continental GT at Police Bend, the session was red flagged. His car was craned off the track because it caused a multi-car traffic jam. Engel's No. 1 Mercedes-AMG Driving Academy car set a new GT3 circuit lap record of 2:17.153 in the final five minutes of the second practise session. Mortara was a second slower in second, followed by Bamber and Vanthoor. Estre was fifth, with Müller the highest-ranked privateer in sixth. Cheng Congfu, Van der Zande, Fong and Nick Catsburg completed the top ten. On 20 minutes, Lyons was caught off guard by his car's anti-lock braking system and damaged the front-right suspension against the barrier on the hill between Paiol and Police corners, stopping the session and necessitating a rebuild for qualifying.

Friday afternoon's half-hour qualifying session set the starting order for the qualification race using each driver's fastest laps. Vanthoor took the lead after everyone completed their first timed laps before two stoppages limited driving. Pasin Lathouras lost control of the No. 50 Spirit of Race Ferrari 488 GT3's rear driving through Mandarin Oriental Bend, colliding with the outside barrier and stopping on the circuit. Lyons raced over the inside kerbs as he approached the same corner, spinning his car violently into the wall twice. In his final race as an Audi works driver, Mortara set a new GT3 track record and took pole position with a time of 2:16.862 on new tyres. Vanthoor joined him on the grid's front row, and Bamber was the best-placed Porsche driver in third. Fourth-placed Engel knocked his car's rear out of alignment after glancing the barriers. Müller, Estre, Van der Zande, Catsburg, Fong, Cheng completed the top ten. Fabian Plentz was the fastest driver not to qualify in the top ten, starting ahead of Mirko Bortolotti in the faster of FFF Racing's two Lamborghini Huracán GT3s. The Ferraris of Hiroki Yoshimoto and Lathouras were 13th and 15th; Marchy Lee separated them in 14th. Couto led Lyons, Ricky Capo, Philip Ma, Kuo Hsin Kuo, John Shen and Tommy Tulpe as the last drivers to set a lap time. O'Young did not set a qualifying lap because his crew was unable to repair his car after an accident during the second practice session that destroyed the top mounting and cracked the chassis.

=== Qualifying classification ===
Final qualifying classification
Pos.	Class	No.	Driver	Team	Manufacturer	Time	Gap
1	P	7	(Italy) Edoardo Mortara	(Belgium) Audi Sport Team WRT	Audi	2:16.862	—
2	P	8	(Belgium) Laurens Vanthoor	(Belgium) Audi Sport Team WRT	Audi	2:17.016	+0.154
3	P	911	(New Zealand) Earl Bamber	(Germany) Manthey Racing	Porsche	2:17.133	+0.271
4	P	1	(Germany) Maro Engel	(Germany) Mercedes-AMG Driving Academy	Mercedes-Benz	2:17.147	+0.285
5	G	15	(Switzerland) Nico Müller	(Hong Kong) Phoenix Racing Asia	Audi	2:17.863	+1.001
6	P	912	(France) Kévin Estre	(Germany) Manthey Racing	Porsche	2:17.945	+1.083
7	G	2	(Netherlands) Renger van der Zande	(Germany) Mercedes-AMG Driving Academy	Mercedes-Benz	2:18.322	+1.460
8	G	9	(Netherlands) Nick Catsburg	(Germany) Rowe Racing	BMW	2:19.577	+2.715
9	G	10	(Hong Kong) Adderly Fong	(Hong Kong) Bentley Team Absolute	Bentley	2:19.693	+2.831
10	G	11	(China) Cheng Congfu	(Hong Kong) Absolute Racing	Audi	2:19.792	+2.930
11	S	28	(Germany) Fabian Plentz	(Germany) Team HCB-Rutronik Racing	Audi	2:20.417	+3.555
12	P	5	(Italy) Mirko Bortolotti	(China) FFF Racing	Lamborghini	2:20.504	+3.642
13	G	89	(Japan) Hiroki Yoshimoto	(Japan) HubAuto Racing	Ferrari	2:20.977	+4.115
14	S	16	(Hong Kong) Marchy Lee	Audi Hong Kong	Audi	2:21.127	+4.265
15	S	50	(Thailand) Pasin Lathouras	(Switzerland) Spirit of Race	Ferrari	2:21.257	+4.395
16	G	55	(Portugal) André Couto	(China) FFF Racing	Lamborghini	2:21.285	+4.423
17	G	88	(United Kingdom) Richard Lyons	(Hong Kong) Craft-Bamboo Racing	Porsche	2:22.440	+5.578
18	S	17	(Australia) Ricky Capo	(Australia) Modena Engineering	BMW	2:23.379	+6.517
19	B	98	(Hong Kong) Philip Ma	(Hong Kong) GruppeM Racing	Porsche	2:27.126	+10.264
20	B	22	(Chinese Taipei) Kuo Hsin Kuo	(Chinese Taipei) D2 Racing Team	Mercedes-Benz	2:28.046	+11.184
21	B	68	(Canada) John Shen	(Hong Kong) Modena Motorsports	Porsche	2:31.330	+14.468
22	B	29	(Germany) Tommy Tulpe	(Germany) Team HCB-Rutronik Racing	Audi	2:33.367	+16.505
23	G	99	(Hong Kong) Darryl O'Young	(Hong Kong) Craft-Bamboo Racing	Porsche	No time (Note: Darryl O'Young did not set a time in Qualifying, because the Craft-Bamboo Racing crew were unable to repair the car due to the amount of structural damage suffered during an accident in Free Practice 2.)	—

Categorisation
Icon	Class
P	Platinum
G	Gold
S	Silver
B	Bronze

== Qualifying Race ==
The qualifying race to set the grid order for the main race began in cloudy and dry weather at 12:10 Macau Standard Time (UTC+08:00) on 19 November. Lyons' car was withdrawn by Craft-Bamboo Racing because it could not be repaired in time for the event due to substantial damage to the roll cage caused by his crash in qualifying. Vanthoor accelerated quicker than his teammate Mortara as the race began, passing him into Reservoir Bend. Mortara then lost control of his vehicle and slammed into the corner's left-side wall as he attempted to stay in distance of Vanthoor. To try to avoid colliding with him, the remainder of the field crowded in, and he damaged his car's spoiler and rear panel. Meanwhile, Vanthoor prevented Bamber and his teammate Estre from passing him, with the Mercedes duo of Engel and Van der Zande behind them. On lap two, Müller (who spun from contact with Van der Zande at Lisboa corner and hit a barrier) lost control of his vehicle leaving Mandarin Oriental Bend and struck a wall heavily, necessitating the safety car's deployment. Mortara made two pit stops during the safety car period to remedy aerodynamic deficiencies from his fractured rear wing, repair damage to his back panel, and have new tyres installed on his car. He fell to 13th because the safety car neutralised much of the potential time lost due to the lengthy time required extricating Müller's car because of the small track and the lack of speedy recovery..

"To be honest, in past years we saw that we lost the race at the start, so we put a lot of preparation into the start and that worked out, I had a slightly better start than Edo, so I was in front. I left him as much room as I could. That gave me first position to control the race. Then, it was more difficult than I expected, I had to push hard in the second sector as the Porsches are faster in the first and third sector, but I managed to keep them at bay. For tomorrow, it is obviously easier to control the start when you have both cars on the front row, but I am not particularly worried. I know that we have the potential to do well and I will try to make the best of it.”

— Laurens Vanthoor on winning the qualification race and starting the main race from pole position.

Vanthoor led as racing resumed at the start of lap five. The action was cut short after Ma and Chen collided and crashed at Reservoir Bend. The safety car was withdrawn on lap nine. Bamber applied significant pressure to Vanthoor and slipstreamed him into Mandarin Oriental Bend corner. Bamber then lost momentum through the following turn and gave Vanthoor a small advantage that grew progressivelly. Vanthoor maintained his lead through the circuit's mountain portion. Mortara returned to the lead lap before a mistimed overtake on the final lap put O'Young into the Maternity Bend wall. Vanthoor was the first to finish after 12 laps, earning pole position for the main race. Bamber finished second on the road, 0.786 seconds behind his teammate Estre. Engel finished fourth with teammate Van der Zande fifth. Fong, Catsburg, Plentz, Yoshimoto and Bortolotti rounded out the top ten finishers. The final classified finishers were Cheng, Lee, Mortara, Couto, Lathouras, Capo, Kuo, Ma, Tulpe and O'Young. The two safety cars made the race untidy for all participants, therefore seven of the twelve racing laps were conducted under green flag conditions.

=== Qualification Race classification ===
Final classification of the qualifying race
Pos.	Class	No.	Driver	Team	Manufacturer	Laps	Time/Retired
1	P	8	(Belgium) Laurens Vanthoor	(Belgium) Audi Sport Team WRT	Audi	12	33:00.643
2	P	911	(New Zealand) Earl Bamber	(Germany) Manthey Racing	Porsche	12	+0.786
3	P	912	(France) Kévin Estre	(Germany) Manthey Racing	Porsche	12	+1.840
4	P	1	(Germany) Maro Engel	(Germany) Mercedes-AMG Driving Academy	Mercedes-Benz	12	+6.982
5	G	2	(Netherlands) Renger van der Zande	(Germany) Mercedes-AMG Driving Academy	Mercedes-Benz	12	+9.516
6	G	10	(Hong Kong) Adderly Fong	(Hong Kong) Bentley Team Absolute	Bentley	12	+15.748
7	G	9	(Netherlands) Nick Catsburg	(Germany) Rowe Racing	BMW	12	+17.820
8	S	28	(Germany) Fabian Plentz	(Germany) Team HCB-Rutronik Racing	Audi	12	+19.299
9	G	89	(Japan) Hiroki Yoshimoto	(Japan) HubAuto Racing	Ferrari	12	+21.017
10	P	5	(Italy) Mirko Bortolotti	(China) FFF Racing	Lamborghini	12	+21.563
11	G	11	(China) Cheng Congfu	(Hong Kong) Absolute Racing	Audi	12	+22.193
12	S	16	(Hong Kong) Marchy Lee	Audi Hong Kong	Audi	12	+23.331
13	P	7	(Italy) Edoardo Mortara	(Belgium) Audi Sport Team WRT	Audi	12	+24.430
14	G	55	(Portugal) André Couto	(China) FFF Racing	Lamborghini	12	+27.872
15	S	50	(Thailand) Pasin Lathouras	(Switzerland) Spirit of Race	Ferrari	12	+28.152
16	S	17	(Australia) Ricky Capo	(Australia) Modena Engineering	BMW	12	+31.061
17	B	22	(Chinese Taipei) Kuo Hsin Kuo	(Chinese Taipei) D2 Racing Team	Mercedes-Benz	12	+53.841
18	B	98	(Hong Kong) Philip Ma	(Hong Kong) GruppeM Racing	Porsche	12	+1:06.860
19	B	29	(Germany) Tommy Tulpe	(Germany) Team HCB-Rutronik Racing	Audi	12	+1:08.540
20	G	99	(Hong Kong) Darryl O'Young	(Hong Kong) Craft-Bamboo Racing	Porsche	11	+1 Lap/Accident
Ret	B	68	(Canada) John Shen	(Hong Kong) Modena Motorsports	Porsche	4	Accident
Ret	G	15	(Switzerland) Nico Müller	(Hong Kong) Phoenix Racing Asia	Audi	1	Accident
DNS	G	88	(United Kingdom) Richard Lyons	(Hong Kong) Craft-Bamboo Racing	Porsche	—	Accident (Note: Richard Lyons did not start the Qualification Race and the Main Race, because the Craft-Bamboo Racing crew were unable to repair the car due to the amount of structural damage to the chassis suffered during an accident in Qualifying.)

== Main Race ==
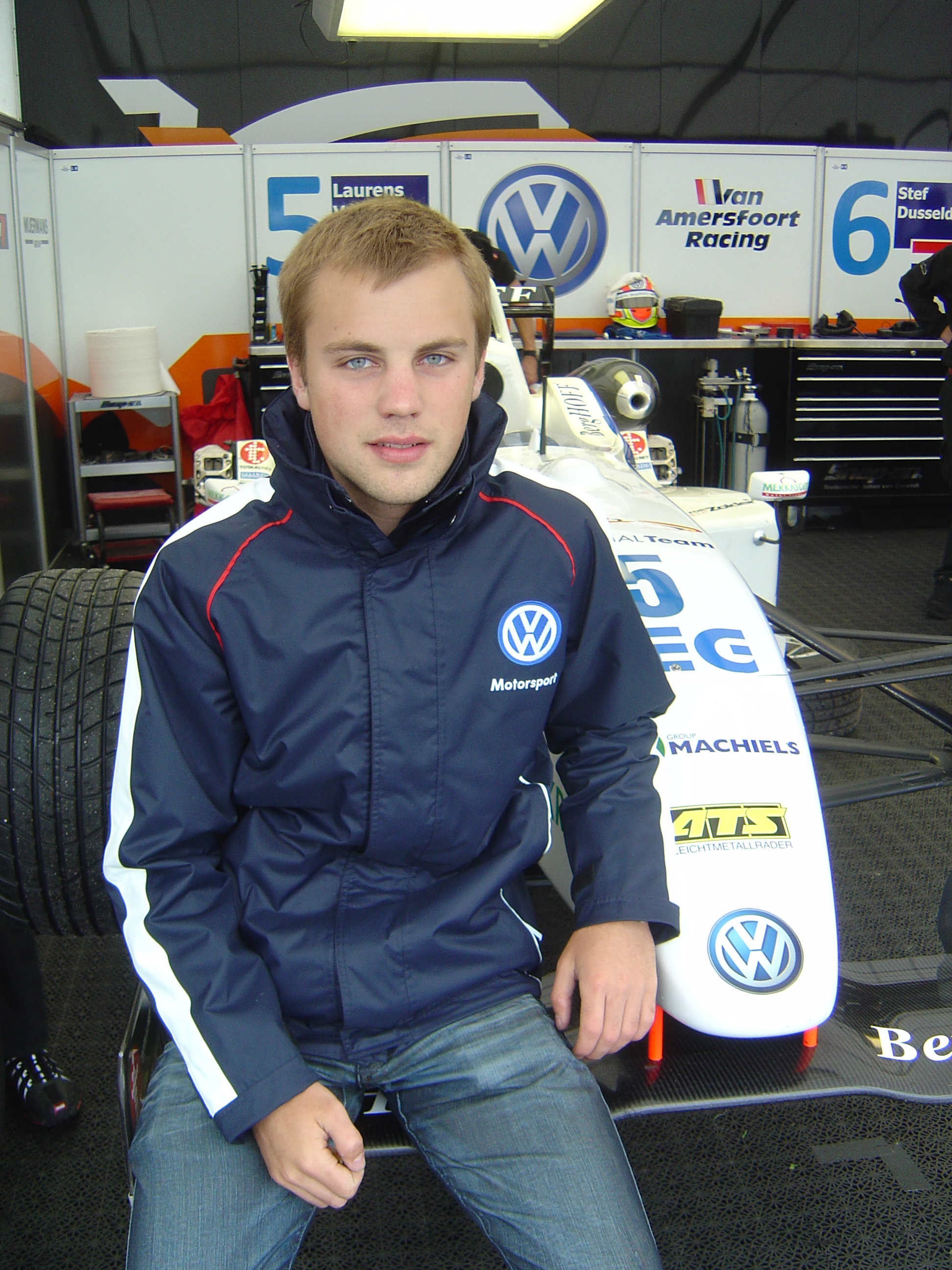
Laurens Vanthoor (pictured in 2009) was declared the winner of the race after his car went airborne and landed on its roof during the fifth lap.

The main race commenced in cloudy and dry weather at 12:55 local time on 20 November. The stewards led by Tim Mayer, the Automobile Competition Committee for the United States' chair, imposed three-place grid penalties on Van der Zande and Mortara for their respective collisions with Müller and O'Young in the previous day's qualification race. Müller and O'Young were withdrawn from the race due to heavy structural damage to their cars that could not be fixed in Macau. Vanthoor maintained the lead as he approached Mandarin Oriental Bend, while Bamber held off a challenge from teammate Estre for second. Bamber's block on Estre caused Engel, who was using his car's torque to draw alongside the Porsches, to collide with a barrier at Reservoir Bend turn, resulting in a five-second time penalty. Engel recovered from the contact without losing a large amount of time and passed Fong into the Lisboa corner to reclaim fourth position. At the conclusion of the first lap, Vanthoor led Bamber, Estre, Engel, Fong and Van der Zande who gained two positions from the start to run in sixth.

The race initially went under the safety car due to a crash for Capo exiting Fisherman's Bend on his first lap, as his BMW Z4 GT3 clattered the tyre barrier at considerable speed midway through lap two, necessitating repairs. The race was stopped the conclusion of lap three for 45 minutes, which designated the race official under the FIA Code. Every driver had to enter the pit lane after driving behind the safety car. A marshal was hurt while repairing the barrier and recovering Capo's car, and an ambulance was dispatched to the scene. The official timing clock continued to run during the stoppage, and 18 minutes remained when all cars returned to the circuit. The event restarted behind the safety car on lap five. With 15 minutes to go, the safety car was withdrawn and racing resumed. Bamber used his vehicle's superior torque to pass Vanthoor for the lead into Mandarin Oriental Bend and build up a wide enough margin to neutralise the penalty's effect after being told of his five-second time penalty for his collision with Engel at the initial start.

"Physically, I am okay. Everything is fine. It is just one of the nastiest corners to have a crash and then doing the whole straight on the roof and seeing the other cars coming is not really describable. A scary memory in my mind, but as I said, everything is okay. I think if you go back two laps before the crash, I would have deserved the win. I am not saying that I was going to win, but I had the potential for it. Now, officially, I have won it, but the way it happened is very strange and I don't really know if I have deserved in a way. I crashed and I have made a mistake, but I am still the winner. That is very awkward. It would have been a better show without the crash for everybody. It is a victory, but I don't know where to put it in my head."

— Laurens Vanthoor about his accident and on winning his first race at Macau.

Vanthoor followed Bamber closely, hoping to slipstream him down to the braking zone for Lisboa corner. Consequently, Vanthoor was caught in an aerodynamic push, misread the entry to the next corner, and slipped wide by going over the inside kerbs. He was sent heavily into the lower catchfence on the outside exit barrier at 250 km/h (160 mph), removing his car's rear wing. Then the floor of Vanthoor's car caught air at its front, lifted airborne and overturned onto its roof. His car's bay caught fire while sliding on its roof for more than 200 m (660 ft) into Lisboa corner. Vanthoor was slowed by the friction of the roof before stopping as other drivers swerved to avoid hitting him. No other driver collided with his Audi. Vanthoor was unhurt and exited the car unaided.

The race was stopped for the second time and did not resume because there were only four minutes remaining and clearing the debris left by the accident would have been time-consuming. Race officials decided to take the results from the running order at the end of the fourth lap. Although regulations stated a driver who caused a red flag would face sanctions such as disqualification, the stewards took no action. Vanthoor thus took his first victory in Macau, and Audi won the FIA GT World Cup Manufacturers' Trophy. Estre was 3.5 seconds behind in second and Engel completed the podium in third. Bamber's five-second time penalty dropped him from second to fourth. Fong, Van der Zande, Catsburg, Plentz, Bortolotti, Cheng, Yoshimoto, Couto, Mortara, Lathouras, Kuo, Ma, Shen, Tulpe and Lee were the final classified finishers. Vanthoor led for four laps, more than any other driver, in less than two laps at race pace.

=== Post-race ===
The FIA responded to Vanthoor's accident and the Macau scheduling restrictions by moving the opening race of the 2017 Guia Race of Macau from Sunday morning to Saturday afternoon to accommodate for the increased potential that the 2017 race would last 18 laps. As part of the race organizer's goal to avoid repeated crashes, only manufacturer-supported teams with professional drivers rated platinum or bronze were allowed to compete, and safety and trackside recovery procedures were improved.

=== Main Race classification ===
Final classification of the main race
Pos.	Class	No.	Driver	Team	Manufacturer	Laps	Time/Retired
1	P	8	(Belgium) Laurens Vanthoor	(Belgium) Audi Sport Team WRT	Audi	4	12:21.870
2	P	912	(France) Kévin Estre	(Germany) Manthey Racing	Porsche	4	+3.500
3	P	1	(Germany) Maro Engel	(Germany) Mercedes-AMG Driving Academy	Mercedes-Benz	4	+5.605
4	P	911	(New Zealand) Earl Bamber	(Germany) Manthey Racing	Porsche	4	+6.878 (Note: Earl Bamber was originally classified as 2nd, but a 5-second penalty was later applied due to contact with Maro Engel at the start of the race.)
5	G	10	(Hong Kong) Adderly Fong	(Hong Kong) Bentley Team Absolute	Bentley	4	+7.365
6	G	2	(Netherlands) Renger van der Zande	(Germany) Mercedes-AMG Driving Academy	Mercedes-Benz	4	+10.492
7	G	9	(Netherlands) Nick Catsburg	(Germany) Rowe Racing	BMW	4	+12.508
8	S	28	(Germany) Fabian Plentz	(Germany) Team HCB-Rutronik Racing	Audi	4	+14.486
9	P	5	(Italy) Mirko Bortolotti	(China) FFF Racing	Lamborghini	4	+16.396
10	G	11	(China) Cheng Congfu	(Hong Kong) Absolute Racing	Audi	4	+18.384
11	G	89	(Japan) Hiroki Yoshimoto	(Japan) HubAuto Racing	Ferrari	4	+20.900
12	G	55	(Portugal) André Couto	(China) FFF Racing	Lamborghini	4	+23.183
13	P	7	(Italy) Edoardo Mortara	(Belgium) Audi Sport Team WRT	Audi	4	+25.471
14	S	50	(Thailand) Pasin Lathouras	(Switzerland) Spirit of Race	Ferrari	4	+27.899
15	B	22	(Chinese Taipei) Kuo Hsin Kuo	(Chinese Taipei) D2 Racing Team	Mercedes-Benz	4	+29.787
16	B	98	(Hong Kong) Philip Ma	(Hong Kong) GruppeM Racing	Porsche	4	+31.164
17	B	68	(Canada) John Shen	(Hong Kong) Modena Motorsports	Porsche	4	+32.825
18	B	29	(Germany) Tommy Tulpe	(Germany) Team HCB-Rutronik Racing	Audi	4	+36.152
19	S	16	(Hong Kong) Marchy Lee	Audi Hong Kong	Audi	4	+38.418
Ret	S	17	(Australia) Ricky Capo	(Australia) Modena Engineering	BMW	0	Accident
DNS	G	99	(Hong Kong) Darryl O'Young	(Hong Kong) Craft-Bamboo Racing	Porsche	—	Accident (Note: Darryl O'Young did not start the Main Race, because the Craft-Bamboo Racing crew were unable to repair the car due to the amount of structural damage to the chassis suffered during an accident in the Qualification Race.)
DNS	G	15	(Switzerland) Nico Müller	(Hong Kong) Phoenix Racing Asia	Audi	—	Accident (Note: Nico Müller did not start the Main Race, because the Phoenix Racing Asia crew were unable to repair the car due to the amount of structural damage suffered during an accident in the Qualification Race.)
DNS	G	88	(United Kingdom) Richard Lyons	(Hong Kong) Craft-Bamboo Racing	Porsche	—	Accident

== See also ==
- 2016 Macau Grand Prix
- 2016 Guia Race of Macau
