= Zhang Zhendong =

Chinese racing driver

- Nationality: Chinese
- Born: 16 May 1992 (age 34) Shanghai, China

TCR International Series career
- Debut season: 2017
- Current team: ZZZ Team
- Car number: 81
- Starts: 2

Previous series
- 2017 2014-16 2013 2010-17 2008 2007-08: TCR International Series; Porsche Carrera Cup Asia; Formula Masters China; China Touring Car Championship; Formula Asia 2.0; Asian Formula Renault Challenge

Championship titles
- 2015–16: China Touring Car Championship – Super Production 2.0T

Zhang Zhendong (Chinese: 张臻东; pinyin: Zhāng Zhēndōng, born 16 May 1992) is a Chinese racing driver currently competing in the TCR International Series and China Touring Car Championship. Having previously competed in the Porsche Carrera Cup Asia, Formula Masters China and Asian Formula Renault Challenge amongst others.

== Racing career ==
Zhang began his career in 2007 in the Asian Formula Renault Challenge, he continued in the championship until 2008. In 2008, he also raced in the Formula Asia 2.0, he finished the season tenth in the championship standings that year. For 2010, he switched to the China Touring Car Championship, driving for the Haima team, he continued with the team for 2011, taking a single victory on his way to finishing sixth in the standings that year. For 2012, he switched to the Volkswagen team, finishing his first season the team eleventh in standings. Continuing with the team for many seasons, he won the championship in 2015 and 2016, taking several victories and podiums. In 2013, he raced in the Formula Masters China series. For 2014, he raced in the Porsche Carrera Cup Asia, he continued in the series for two further seasons, along with his CTCC programme.

In September 2017, it was announced that Zhang would race in the TCR International Series, driving an Audi RS 3 LMS TCR for ZZZ Team.

== Racing record ==
=== Complete TCR International Series results ===
(key) (Races in bold indicate pole position) (Races in italics indicate fastest lap)

Year	Team	Car	1	2	3	4	5	6	7	8	9	10	11	12	13	14	15	16	17	18	19	20	DC	Points
2017	ZZZ Team	Audi RS 3 LMS TCR	RIM; 1	RIM; 2	BHR; 1	BHR; 2	SPA; 1	SPA; 2	MNZ; 1	MNZ; 2	SAL; 1	SAL; 2	HUN; 1	HUN; 2	OSC; 1	OSC; 2	CHA; 1	CHA; 2	CHN; 1; 14	CHN; 2; 7	DUB; 1	DUB; 2	27th	10
