= 2016 Macau Grand Prix =

Formula Three motor race

Race details
Date	20 November 2016
Official name	63rd Suncity Group Macau Grand Prix – FIA F3 World Cup
Location	Guia Circuit, Macau
Course	Temporary street circuit 6.120 km (3.803 mi)
Distance	Qualifying Race; 10 laps, 61.200 km (38.028 mi); Main Race; 15 laps, 91.800 km (57.042 mi)
Weather	Qualifying Race: Overcast; Main Race: Overcast
- Qualifying Race

Pole
Driver	(United Kingdom) George Russell	HitechGP
Time	2:10.100

Fastest Lap
Driver	(United Kingdom) Callum Ilott	Van Amersfoort Racing
Time	2:11.445 (on lap 9)

Podium
First	(Portugal) António Félix da Costa	Carlin
Second	(United Kingdom) Callum Ilott	Van Amersfoort Racing
Third	(Brazil) Sérgio Sette Câmara	Carlin
- Main Race

Pole
Driver	(Portugal) António Félix da Costa	Carlin

Fastest Lap
Driver	(Sweden) Felix Rosenqvist	Prema Powerteam
Time	2:11.080 (on lap 14)

Podium
First	(Portugal) António Félix da Costa	Carlin
Second	(Sweden) Felix Rosenqvist	Prema Powerteam
Third	(Brazil) Sérgio Sette Câmara	Carlin

The 2016 Macau Grand Prix (formally the 63rd Suncity Group Macau Grand Prix – FIA F3 World Cup) was a Formula Three motor race held on 20 November 2016 at the Guia Circuit in Macau. The 2016 edition marked the first time the Grand Prix was formally called the FIA F3 World Cup. It was also the 63rd running of the event. The 15-lap race was won by Carlin driver António Félix da Costa after starting from pole position. Felix Rosenqvist finished second for Prema Powerteam and Félix da Costa's teammate Sérgio Sette Câmara came in third. Félix Da Costa had won the earlier ten-lap qualification race on Saturday with Callum Ilott second and Sette Cãmara third.

George Russell won the pole position for the qualification race by setting the fastest lap in the event's second qualifying session but lost the lead to Ilott heading into the first corner. The qualification event was neutralised following an accident involving Ye Hongli and Daiki Sasaki, and when the race restarted four laps later, Félix da Costa drafted Ilott and overtook him to take over the lead. Ilott remained close behind Félix da Costa for the remaining five laps but was unable to reduce the time deficit which would have allowed him to affect an overtaking manoeuvre on him who maintained his advantage to win the qualification race.

Félix da Costa's qualification race victory ensured that he started from pole position in the main event. He lost the lead and fell to third, behind his fast-starting teammate Sette Cãmara and Ilott. Félix da Costa was able to reclaim second from Ilott and was 0.7 seconds behind Sette Cãmara before a safety car period neutralised the race. He retook first from Sette Cãmara at the lap-seven restart. He pulled away from his teammate until a three-lap safety car period reduced his advantage to nothing. Félix da Costa fended off an overtaking manoeuvre from Sette Cãmara at the restart to keep first place. Rosenqvist overtook Sette Cãmara for second but was unable to draw close enough to affect a pass on Félix da Costa who remained in the lead for the rest of the race to win his second Macau Grand Prix. There were two lead changes and two yellow flags during the course of the race.

== Entry list and background ==
The entry list for the Macau Grand Prix was released on 6 October 2016. Initial entries for the race were so large that the Fédération Internationale de l'Automobile (FIA)'s director of circuit competition Frederic Bertrand stated there was a "pent-up desire amongst all these front-runners to prove their mettle in a face-to-face competition." Confusion arose when the race's qualification standards were published with several illegible drivers entered after they would were not granted an invitation to the event due to non-competition in a FIA-sanctioned Formula Three race during the 2016 season. 27 drivers featured in the initial entry list and included the 2015 European Formula Three champion Felix Rosenqvist, who won the race in 2014 and 2015, returning to defend his title, in lieu of Lance Stroll who had other motor racing commitments, and partnering Maximilian Günther and Nick Cassidy.

Daniel Juncadella returned to drive in the race, replacing Ben Barnicoat, with 24 Hours of Spa winner Alexander Sims, confirmed to participate in the event, after sealing his eligibility in the event by competing at the MotorSport Vision Formula Three Cup season-closing round at Snetterton. Nissan factory driver Jann Mardenborough made his first appearance in the event, while Lando Norris, the Formula Renault 2.0 Northern European Cup champion, also made his debut at the track. Peter Li was originally slated to return to racing after a six-month absence following a heavy accident at the Red Bull Ring but his seat was taken by Formula E driver António Félix da Costa on the invitation of Carlin owner Trevor Carlin. Félix da Costa, Juncadella and Rosenqvist tested for two days at the Red Bull Ring to prepare for the event. GP3 Series driver Arjun Maini took over from Niko Kari who had other racing duties while Euroformula Open and former MSA Formula Championship drivers Keyvan Andres Soori and Daniel Ticktum completed the 29-driver entry list. Norris, Ticktum and Jake Hughes competed in the season-closing European Formula Three meeting at the Hockenheimring to prepare for Macau.

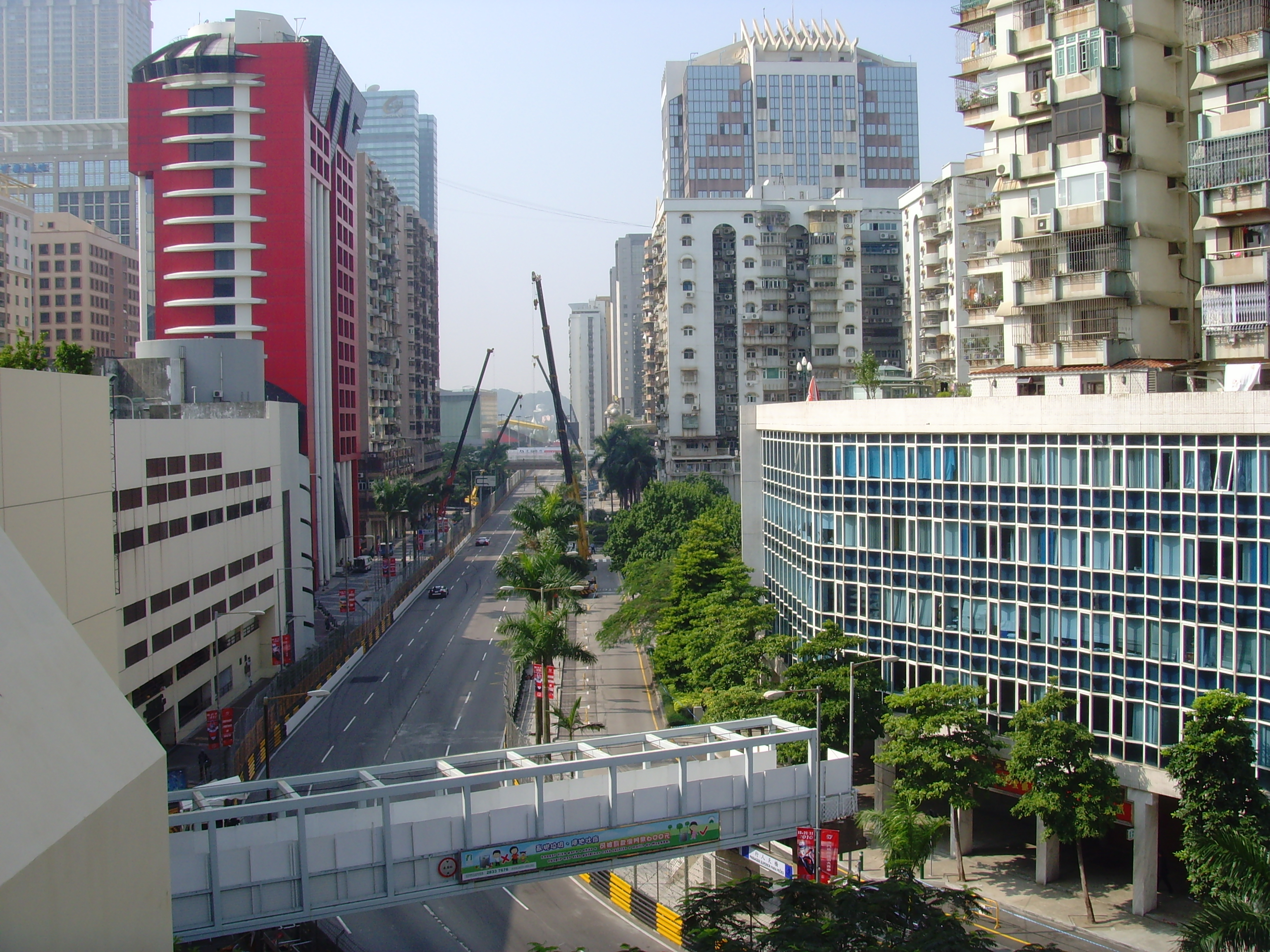
Guia Circuit, where the race was held

The Macau Grand Prix is a Formula Three race considered to be a stepping stone to higher motor racing categories such as Formula One and is the territory's most prestigious international sporting event. The 2016 Macau Grand Prix was the 63rd running of the event and was held on the 6.2 km (3.9 mi) 22-turn Guia Circuit on 20 November 2016. In September 2016, the race's organiser, Barry Bland, resigned following hurried developments which saw teams not receive the event's regulations until late. That same month, the race was granted FIA F3 World Cup status by the FIA, following a restructure in the wake of Bland's resignation, which meant the FIA became the event's regulator.

It was the first Macau Grand Prix in which Pirelli supplied the teams with tyres, after Yokohama who was the supplier since the event switched to Formula Three regulations in 1983 withdrew. Pirelli's tyre was based on the type used in the BRDC British Formula 3 Championship and were tested at the Autodromo Nazionale Monza to simulate Macau's high top speeds. Competitors were granted a maximum allowance of five sets of tyres during the race weekend, up from three the previous year, following issues with the tyres in testing.

Rosenqvist said that he felt the Pirelli tyres would change the event's aspect drastically and aimed to win it: "The competition in Macau is always super strong, and this year will be no exception. I think really the only one missing is [current European F3 champion] Lance Stroll, but other than that it's as competitive as it could get." Félix da Costa stated he was returning to Macau because of its iconic status and his familiarity with the track. When asked if he felt he could achieve the victory, he replied "yes and no" because of not having had experience in Formula Three cars for the previous three years, but said he would give it an attempt and would be pleased to secure a top-five finishing position. The track's fastest lap record holder Sérgio Sette Câmara said it was "amazing" to compete in the event, revealing that he would carry the experience he had from the 2015 edition and express confidence in his car's set-up.

== Practice and qualifying ==
A total of two 40-minute practice sessions preceded the Sunday race: one on Thursday morning and one on Friday morning. Rosenqvist lapped fastest in the first practice session at 2 minutes and 13.099 seconds, which was his final timed lap late on. He was four-tenths of a second quicker than the second-fastest driver Callum Ilott who moved out of traffic to drive with a clear track on his fastest lap. Kenta Yamashita was third-fastest, ahead of Juncadella and Norris; the latter was quickest until ten minutes remaining. Jake Hughes, Félix da Costa, Sims, David Beckmann and George Russell were in positions seven through ten. The session was stopped early for 16 minutes when Ferdinand Habsburg went into Fisherman's Bend corner too quickly and understeered into the turn's barriers, causing his car's left-front corner to become lodged under the wall. Habsburg was transported to a local hospital for a precautionary check-up. Consequently, the session was extended by five minutes to provide competitors with more on-track time. Cassidy stopped his car on the front straight with brake problems and Mardenborough made a pit stop because his car's engine cover detached and slowed him. Tadasuke Makino carried excess speed turning into Lisboa Bend corner and damaged his car's front-left corner in an impact with the turn's exit barrier.

Qualifying was split into two sessions; the first was held on Thursday afternoon and ran for 40 minutes with the second held on Friday afternoon and lasted 30 minutes. The fastest time set by each driver from either session counted towards their final starting position for the qualification race. In the first qualifying session, Félix da Costa set a late provisional pole position lap time of 2 minutes and 11.535 seconds, which was two-tenths of a second faster than Ilott who held the pole until Félix da Costa's time. Rosenqvist was third-fastest, ahead of Yamashita in fourth and Juncadella fifth. Sette Cãmara, Norris, Cassidy, Hughes and Sam MacLeod completed the top-ten provisional placings. Sims was the fastest driver not to record a time in the top ten and was 1.065 seconds off Félix da Costa's pace. He was followed by Maini, Russell, Anthoine Hubert and Günther. Ticktum, Pedro Piquet, Chang Wing Chung, Nikita Mazepin and Joel Eriksson completed the top-twenty fastest drivers. The session was red flagged four times: firstly for Yamashita when his wheel became detached from his car, possibly from a split rim. The second was for Sims who was stranded in the centre of Lisboa corner's run-off area, Norris impacted the San Francisco Bend barriers and Eriksson hit the Solitude Esses wall, triggering the third stoppage. The session ended early when Juncadella crashed heavily into the Fisherman's Bend barrier.

Despite using old tyres, Ilott drafted off another driver on his final timed circuit and lapped fastest in the second practice session at 2 minutes and 10.703 seconds. Maini was half a second slower in second. Yamashita, Rosenqvist, Sette Cãmara, Hughes, Félix da Costa, Norris, Günther and Cassidy made up positions second to tenth. Ticktum hit the Maternity Bend wall and returned to the pit lane to end his session early while Sho Tsuboi struck the Lisboa barrier. Ye Hongli lost control of his car and contacted the exit barriers at the Police bend, stranding his vehicle sideways across the circuit. Yellow flags were shown to warn participants about the stricken car. Guanyu Zhou came across the scene and reacted late, causing him to hit his countryman's car, briefly going onto its side before ending up on the tarmac. Both drivers were unhurt but the incident ended the session prematurely.

Russell was the quickest driver in the second qualifying session, which took place in cool, overcast and later, wet weather conditions, and clinched pole position with a new track record time of 2 minutes and 10.100 seconds which was set late in the session. He was joined on the grid's front row by Ilott who recorded lap 0.370 seconds slower and had the pole position until Russell's lap. Félix da Costa qualified third, Sette Cãmara took fourth and Yamashita started fifth. Hughes and Günther were the next two starters. Rosenqvist heavily locked his tyres at Lisboa corner and was restricted to starting eighth, and Norris and Cassidy rounded out the top ten. Juncadella was the fastest driver not to start in the top ten; his best time of two minutes and 11.470 seconds was 1.370 seconds off Russell's place. He was one-tenth of a second in front of Sims, who in turn, was ahead of teammate Ticktum. Hubert and Beckmann were the next two qualifier. MacLeod, Maini, Mazepin, Eriksson and Zhou rounding out the top-twenty starting drivers. The session was first disrupted when Daiki Sasaki went into the Maternity Bend corner and stopped on the track, before Günther went wide, made impact against the R Bend corner wall and slid across the track, causing the session's second stoppage, to allow debris to be cleared from the circuit. Drivers swerved to avoid hitting the debris on the circuit. Qualifying ended early shortly before it was scheduled to conclude when Maini crashed at Lisboa corner.

=== Qualifying classification ===
Final qualifying classification
Pos	No.	Driver	Team	Q1 Time	Rank	Q2 Time	Rank	Gap	Grid
1	8	(United Kingdom) George Russell	HitechGP	2:12.670	13	2:10.100	1		1
2	20	(United Kingdom) Callum Ilott	Van Amersfoort Racing	2:11.761	2	2:10.470	2	+0.370	2
3	29	(Portugal) António Félix da Costa	Carlin	2:11.535	1	2:10.501	3	+0.401	3
4	27	(Brazil) Sérgio Sette Câmara	Carlin	2:11.994	6	2:10.716	4	+0.616	4
5	11	(Japan) Kenta Yamashita	ThreeBond with T-Sport	2:11.797	4	2:10.731	5	+0.631	5
6	28	(United Kingdom) Jake Hughes	Carlin	2:12.360	9	2:10.776	6	+0.676	6
7	2	(Germany) Maximilian Günther	Prema Powerteam	2:13.017	15	2:10.996	7	+0.896	7
8	1	(Sweden) Felix Rosenqvist	Prema Powerteam	2:11.797	3	2:11.054	8	+0.954	8
9	26	(United Kingdom) Lando Norris	Carlin	2:11.996	7	2:11.067	9	+0.967	9
10	3	(New Zealand) Nick Cassidy	Prema Powerteam	2:12.123	8	2:11.341	10	+1.241	10
11	9	(Spain) Daniel Juncadella	HitechGP	2:11.821	5	2:11.470	11	+1.370	11
12	30	(United Kingdom) Alexander Sims	Double R Racing	2:12.600	11	2:11.597	12	+1.497	12
13	31	(United Kingdom) Dan Ticktum	Double R Racing	2:13.102	16	2:11.674	13	+1.574	13
14	21	(France) Anthoine Hubert	Van Amersfoort Racing	2:12.727	14	2:11.751	14	+1.651	14
15	23	(Germany) David Beckmann	Mücke Motorsport	2:14.062	22	2:11.775	15	+1.675	15
16	32	(United Kingdom) Sam MacLeod	Fortec Motorsport	2:12.536	10	2:11.799	16	+1.699	16
17	17	(India) Arjun Maini	Motopark	2:12.657	12	2:11.871	17	+1.771	17
18	10	(Russia) Nikita Mazepin	HitechGP	2:13.438	19	2:11.987	18	+1.887	18
19	16	(Sweden) Joel Eriksson	Motopark	2:13.479	20	2:12.455	19	+2.355	19
20	18	(China) Guanyu Zhou	Motopark	2:14.278	24	2:12.465	20	+2.365	20
21	22	(Brazil) Pedro Piquet	Van Amersfoort Racing	2:13.276	17	2:12.609	21	+2.509	21
22	19	(Japan) Tadasuke Makino	Toda Racing	2:15.618	29	2:12.838	22	+2.738	22
23	33	(Austria) Ferdinand Habsburg	Fortec Motorsport	2:15.336	28	2:12.879	23	+2.779	23
24	12	(Macau) Wing Chung Chang	ThreeBond with T-Sport	2:13.336	18	2:12.897	24	+2.797	24
25	5	(United Kingdom) Jann Mardenborough	B-Max Racing Team	2:14.174	23	2:13.673	25	+3.573	25
26	6	(Japan) Daiki Sasaki	B-Max Racing Team	2:15.261	27	2:13.772	26	+3.672	26
27	7	(China) Ye Hongli	B-Max Racing Team	2:14.012	21	no time	29	+3.912	27
28	25	(Germany) Keyvan Andres Soori	Mücke Motorsport	2:14.803	25	2:15.028	28	+4.703	28
29	15	(Japan) Sho Tsuboi	TOM'S	2:15.051	26	2:14.868	27	+4.768	29
Bold time indicates the faster of the two times that determined the grid order.

== Qualification race ==
A ten-lap qualification race was held on 19 November and the finishing results determined the starting order for the main event. It was scheduled to occur from 12:10 Macau Standard Time (UTC+08:00), but was delayed for one hour because water had blown onto the pit lane straight and Lisboa corner from the nearby grandstands which evaporated upon marshals laying cement to remove the moisture. When the race began from its standing start, Ilott made a fast getaway and passed Russell for the lead heading into the first corner. Félix da Costa got past of Russell shortly afterwards. Norris, Günther and Hubert made contact with the turn one left-hand side barriers, damaging their cars, with Norris's front wing becoming dislodged and flew into the path of other drivers. The incident caused the cars behind the trio to reduce their speed. Ye however was unable to react and collided with the rear-end of teammate Sasaki's car, launching him into the air and over the latter. Ye landed upright on the circuit. Both drivers were unhurt but the safety car was deployed to allow marshals to extract the cars from the track and clear debris. Norris, Günther, Hubert and Ye retired because of the damage to their cars, while Sasaski made a pit stop for a rear wing replacement.

At the lap-five restart, Félix da Costa ran in Ilott's slipstream and turned right to the outside lane to overtake him for the first position going into Lisboa corner. Yamashita attempted to pass Russell in a manoeuvre that drew him alongside Russell at Mandarin corner; although he went sideways, he regained control of his car. Félix da Costa attempted to drew clear from Ilott but was unable to establish an advantage over him with the two trading fastest lap times and both pull away from Sette Cãmara. Ilott went wide at the final corner midway through and dropped back from Félix da Costa because he scared himself and did not want to push harder afterwards. Ilott slightly gained on Félix da Costa and observed him avoiding impact with the Lisboa corner barrier when the former went slightly wide and elected to not take risks to reach the end of the race. Piquet passed MacLeod and Beckmann around the outside and under braking for Lisboa corner to move into twelfth on lap eight. Yamashita overtook Russell for fourth place on the ninth lap. Ilott recorded the qualification race's fastest lap on the same lap, completing a circuit of 2 minutes and 11.445 seconds. Félix da Costa maintained the lead for the remainder of the race to win. Ilott finished second, 0.850 seconds behind with Sette Camara in third, Yamashita fourth and Russell fifth. Rosenqvist drove conservatively to secure sixth place. Juncadella, Ticktum, Sims and Hughes rounded out the top ten finishers.

=== Qualifying race ===
Final qualification race classification
Pos	No.	Driver	Team	Laps	Time/Retired	Grid
1	29	(Portugal) António Félix da Costa	Carlin	10	27:07.011	3
2	20	(United Kingdom) Callum Ilott	Van Amersfoort Racing	10	+0.850	2
3	27	(Brazil) Sérgio Sette Câmara	Carlin	10	+5.030	4
4	11	(Japan) Kenta Yamashita	ThreeBond with T-Sport	10	+5.797	5
5	8	(United Kingdom) George Russell	HitechGP	10	+7.351	1
6	1	(Sweden) Felix Rosenqvist	Prema Powerteam	10	+7.889	8
7	9	(Spain) Daniel Juncadella	HitechGP	10	+10.136	11
8	31	(United Kingdom) Dan Ticktum	Double R Racing	10	+17.416	13
9	30	(United Kingdom) Alexander Sims	Double R Racing	10	+17.859	12
10	28	(United Kingdom) Jake Hughes	Carlin	10	+20.564	6
11	3	(New Zealand) Nick Cassidy	Prema Powerteam	10	+21.050	10
12	22	(Brazil) Pedro Piquet	Van Amersfoort Racing	10	+21.358	21
13	23	(Germany) David Beckmann	Mücke Motorsport	10	+21.607	15
14	17	(India) Arjun Maini	Motopark	10	+21.996	17
15	16	(Sweden) Joel Eriksson	Motopark	10	+24.194	19
16	12	(Macau) Wing Chung Chang	ThreeBond with T-Sport	10	+24.940	24
17	33	(Austria) Ferdinand Habsburg	Fortec Motorsport	10	+26.006	23
18	10	(Russia) Nikita Mazepin	HitechGP	10	+28.215	18
19	19	(Japan) Tadasuke Makino	Toda Racing	10	+31.905	22
20	5	(United Kingdom) Jann Mardenborough	B-Max Racing Team	10	+32.589	25
21	15	(Japan) Sho Tsuboi	TOM'S	10	+33.073	29
22	25	(Germany) Keyvan Andres Soori	Mücke Motorsport	10	+34.143	28
23	32	(United Kingdom) Sam MacLeod	Fortec Motorsport	10	+56.743	16
Ret	6	(Japan) Daiki Sasaki	B-Max Racing Team	8	Retired	26
Ret	18	(China) Guanyu Zhou	Motopark	7	Retired	20
Ret	2	(Germany) Maximilian Günther	Prema Powerteam	1	Accident Damage	7
Ret	26	(United Kingdom) Lando Norris	Carlin	0	Accident	9
Ret	21	(France) Anthoine Hubert	Van Amersfoort Racing	0	Accident	14
Ret	7	(China) Ye Hongli	B-Max Racing Team	0	Accident	27
Fastest lap: Callum Ilott, 2:11.445, 167.61 km/h (104.15 mph) on lap 9

== Main race ==
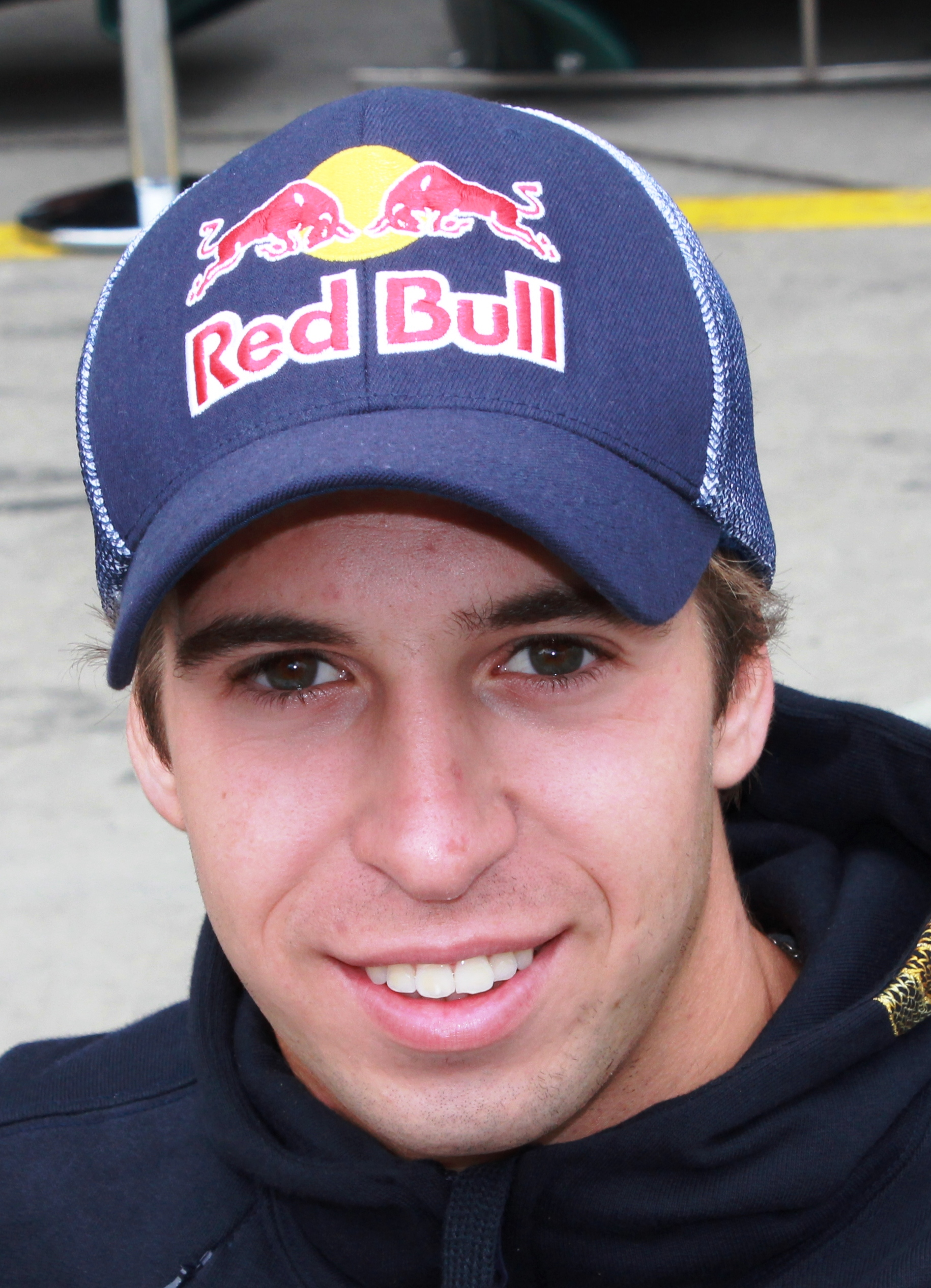
António Félix da Costa (pictured in 2012) won the Macau Grand Prix for the second time in his career.

The race began at 15:30 local time on 20 November. The damage to Ye's car from the qualification race was so great that he was unable to start the main event. Ilott's right-rear tyre was changed after he reported vibrations on his warm-up lap. As the five red lights went out to signal the start of the race, Ilott made a fast start and moved in front of Félix da Costa. However, neither driver took the lead, as Sette Cãmara used the slipstream to his advantage and gained the lead going through Mandarin corner and defended the position heading into the inside of Lisboa corner as other drivers attempted to brake later than him. Félix da Costa managed to claim second position from Ilott with the latter falling to fifth after being passed by Yamashita and Rosenqvist. Rosenqvist made a good start moving from sixth to fourth by the end of the first lap. At the end of the first lap, Sette Cãmara led Félix da Costa by 1.2 seconds which he extended by two-tenths of a second at the conclusion of the following lap. Rosenqvist attacked Yamashita on lap two but could not overtake the latter. Yamashita lost third place on the third lap when Rosenqvist overtook him going into Lisboa corner. This allowed Ilott to move to the inside lane and take fourth place from Yamashita at San Francisco Bend despite minor contact between the two drivers.

On lap four, Günther attempted to pass another car by moving out of its slipstream but sustained a right-rear puncture. His suspension broke on his way to the pit lane, prematurely ending his race. Félix da Costa was able to reduce the time deficit to Sette Camara to be 0.7 seconds behind at the end of lap four until the safety car was deployed following a crash by Mazepin at Faraway corner; the accident was caused by Mazepin overshooting the turn. At the lap-seven restart, Sette Cãmara reacted late to the safety car driving into the pit lane. Félix da Costa ran near his teammate, drafted him heading into Mandarin corner, and turned right onto the outside line to gain the lead before the braking point going into Lisboa corner. Félix da Costa began to pull away from Sette Cãmara, leading him by 1.7 seconds by the start of lap 10 which saw the second deployment of the safety car when Cassidy (who started from 28th after changing his engine) impacted the Paiol corner barrier. The race restarted three laps later with Félix da Costa leading Sette Cãmara. The latter drew alongside his Carlin teammate heading towards Lisboa corner but Félix da Costa held the lead by turning onto the inside line.

Rosenqvist attempted to replicate his earlier overtaking manoeuvre on Sette Cãmara but was not successful. Yamashita and Ilott made contact with each other but the former was able to move into fourth place after passing Ilott. Sette Cãmara slid sideways at Fisherman's Bend corner, allowing Rosenqvist to get into his slipstream. Rosenqvist went to the outside line and passed Sette Cãmara driving into Lisboa corner to move into second place. Piquet collided with Ticktum, ending Ticktum's race while MacLeod went wide off the track in order to avoid a multi-car accident. Rosenqvist began catching Félix da Costa by setting the race's fastest lap on lap 14, completing a circuit of 2 minutes and 11.080 seconds, but could not get close to the latter, though yellow flags were waved for Maini who drove straight at Lisboa corner. Félix da Costa controlled the lead for the remainder of the race to clinch the victory. It was the second Macau Grand Prix win of Félix da Costa's career. Rosenqvist finished second, 1.603 seconds behind, with Sette Cãmara in third, Yamashita fourth and Ilott fifth. Hughes, Russell, Juncadella, Piquet and Sims completed the top ten finishers. The race had two yellow flag periods and two lead changes among two different drivers. Félix da Costa led once for a total of nine laps, more than any other competitor.

=== Post-race ===
The top three finishers appeared on the podium to collect their trophies and spoke to the media in a later press conference. Félix da Costa said he was happy that all the plans he had for every scenario worked, attributing it to experience, and the victory was beyond his comprehension, considering his lack of experience with Formula Three machinery in the previous three years. He stated that he would not return to competing in the Macau Grand Prix in the future in a Formula Three car and wanted to return in Grand Touring machinery but felt more satisfied about the victory because he was not originally scheduled to attend the event. Rosenqvist, who finished in second said, it had been "a tough weekend where everything felt that it was against us" and had to work hard to improve when he was presented with the opportunity. He further added that he attacked from the race's start and accepted his second-place result. Third-place finisher Sette Cãmara said he was delighted with the experience of observing two more experienced drivers than him on how they battled during the event. He further stated that observing them helped educate him on what was required to win the Macau Grand Prix and revealed his desire to return to the race.

=== Main Race classification ===
Final main race classification
Pos	No.	Driver	Team	Laps	Time/Retired	Grid
1	29	(Portugal) António Félix da Costa	Carlin	15	37:57.447	1
2	1	(Sweden) Felix Rosenqvist	Prema Powerteam	15	+1.603	6
3	27	(Brazil) Sérgio Sette Câmara	Carlin	15	+3.194	3
4	11	(Japan) Kenta Yamashita	ThreeBond with T-Sport	15	+3.862	4
5	20	(United Kingdom) Callum Ilott	Van Amersfoort Racing	15	+4.348	2
6	28	(United Kingdom) Jake Hughes	Carlin	15	+6.191	10
7	8	(United Kingdom) George Russell	HitechGP	15	+7.027	5
8	9	(Spain) Daniel Juncadella	HitechGP	15	+7.840	7
9	22	(Brazil) Pedro Piquet	Van Amersfoort Racing	15	+9.361	12
10	30	(United Kingdom) Alexander Sims	Double R Racing	15	+11.294	9
11	26	(United Kingdom) Lando Norris	Carlin	15	+13.040	27
12	12	(Macau) Wing Chung Chang	ThreeBond with T-Sport	15	+15.101	16
13	21	(France) Anthoine Hubert	Van Amersfoort Racing	15	+15.520	28
14	19	(Japan) Tadasuke Makino	Toda Racing	15	+17.674	19
15	18	(China) Guanyu Zhou	Motopark	15	+17.913	25
16	15	(Japan) Sho Tsuboi	TOM'S	15	+18.530	21
17	32	(United Kingdom) Sam MacLeod	Fortec Motorsport	15	+19.081	23
18	25	(Germany) Keyvan Andres Soori	Mücke Motorsport	15	+19.972	22
19	23	(Germany) David Beckmann	Mücke Motorsport	15	+20.325	13
20	5	(United Kingdom) Jann Mardenborough	B-Max Racing Team	15	+22.895	20
21	17	(India) Arjun Maini	Motopark	15	+48.349	14
22	6	(Japan) Daiki Sasaki	B-Max Racing Team	13	+2 laps	24
Ret	16	(Sweden) Joel Eriksson	Motopark	11	Retired	15
Ret	3	(New Zealand) Nick Cassidy	Prema Powerteam	9	Retired	11
Ret	31	(United Kingdom) Dan Ticktum	Double R Racing	7	Retired	8
Ret	33	(Austria) Ferdinand Habsburg	Fortec Motorsport	6	Retired	17
Ret	2	(Germany) Maximilian Günther	Prema Powerteam	4	Accident damage	26
Ret	10	(Russia) Nikita Mazepin	HitechGP	3	Accident	18
Fastest lap: Felix Rosenqvist, 2:11.080, 145.0 km/h (90.1 mph) on lap 14

== See also ==
- 2016 FIA GT World Cup
- 2016 Guia Race of Macau
