= Lou Hon Kei =

Macanese racing driver

- Nationality: Macanese
- Born: Macau

TCR International Series career
- Debut season: 2016
- Current team: Elegant Racing Team
- Car number: 20
- Starts: 2

Previous series
- 2016 2013 2011 2011-13: CEC Super Endurance Championship; Macau Touring Car Cup; Macau Road Sport Challenge; Macau Touring Car Series

Lou Hon Kei is a Macanese racing driver currently competing in the TCR International Series. Having previously competed in the CEC Super Endurance Championship and Macau Touring Car Cup amongst others.

== Racing career ==
Lou began his career in 2011 in the Macau Touring Car Series, he also raced in the Macau Road Sport Challenge that year. He continued in the Macau Touring Car Series for 2012 and 2013, finishing 10th in 2013. He took part in the Macau Touring Car Cup in 2013, finishing 5th. He switched to the CEC Super Endurance Championship for 2016.

In November 2016 it was announced that he would race in the TCR International Series, driving a SEAT León Cup Racer for Elegant Racing Team.

== Racing record ==
=== Complete TCR International Series results ===
(key) (Races in bold indicate pole position) (Races in italics indicate fastest lap)

Year	Team	Car	1	2	3	4	5	6	7	8	9	10	11	12	13	14	15	16	17	18	19	20	21	22	DC	Points
2016	Elegant Racing Team	SEAT León Cup Racer	BHR; 1	BHR; 2	POR; 1	POR; 2	BEL; 1	BEL; 2	ITA; 1	ITA; 2	AUT; 1	AUT; 2	GER; 1	GER; 2	RUS; 1	RUS; 2	THA; 1	THA; 2	SIN; 1	SIN; 2	MYS; 1	MYS; 2	MAC; 1; 16	MAC; 2 Ret	NC	0

^{†} Driver did not finish the race, but was classified as he completed over 90% of the race distance.
