= Jiang Tengyi =

Chinese racing driver (born 1985)

- 江腾一
- Born: January 30, 1985 (age 41); Shanghai (China)

Previous series
- 2010 2004-2009 2007 2005–06 2004 2003 2002: Chinese Touring Car Championship; Asian Formula Renault Challenge; Toyota Formula Atlantic; A1 Grand Prix; Italian Formula Renault; German Formula Volkswagen; German Formula BMW

Jiang Tengyi (simplified Chinese: 江腾一; traditional Chinese: 江騰一; pinyin: Jiāng Téngyī, born January 30, 1985, in Shanghai) is a Chinese racing driver who drives for A1 Team China.

In 1998, Jiang took part in the Chinese KART Cup and raced to third place. In 2000, he repeated his performance in the KART Title Match (International A Grade). He bettered his performance in 2001 with second place. He also won the Macao Jinmei Challenge. The next year, he was champion of the Shanghai TCL KART challenge and received a BMW Scholarship.

Jiang was accepted in German Formula BMW in 2002 and was expected to race in Formula BMW Asia in 2003, but he turned down the chance because Shanghai Volkswagen sponsored him to race in German Formula Volkswagen.

After Formula Volkswagen was discontinued at the end of 2003, Jiang earned a place in Italian Formula Renault in 2004. For the 2005–2006 season, he earned a place in A1 Team China in the A1 Grand Prix series. He has since been replaced by Congfu Cheng and Tung Ho-Pin.

For 2007, Jiang signed with Brooks Associates Racing to compete in the Champ Car Atlantic Championship, however he left the team and the series after only competing in three races after the race that sponsored him, the Champ Car Grand Prix of China was cancelled. Since 2008, he has raced part-time in the Asian Formula Renault Challenge.

In 2010, Jiang raced for Changan Ford Racing in the China Touring Car Championship, finishing second overall in the 2000cc class.

== Career results ==
=== Complete A1 Grand Prix results ===
(key) (Races in bold indicate pole position) (Races in italics indicate fastest lap)

Year	Entrant	1	2	3	4	5	6	7	8	9	10	11	12	13	14	15	16	17	18	19	20	21	22	DC	Points
2005–06	A1 Team China	GBR; SPR; 21	GBR; FEA; 12	GER; SPR; 18	GER; FEA; 17	POR; SPR; Ret	POR; FEA; 14	AUS; SPR; 16	AUS; FEA; Ret	MYS; SPR; 20	MYS; FEA; Ret	UAE; SPR; 19	UAE; FEA; 5	RSA; SPR; Ret	RSA; FEA; Ret	IDN; SPR; Ret	IDN; FEA; Ret	MEX; SPR; 15	MEX; FEA; 17	USA; SPR; 17	USA; FEA; Ret	CHN; SPR	CHN; FEA	22nd	6

=== Complete TCR International Series results ===
(key) (Races in bold indicate pole position) (Races in italics indicate fastest lap)

Year	Team	Car	1	2	3	4	5	6	7	8	9	10	11	12	13	14	15	16	17	18	19	20	21	22	DC	Points
2015	Target Competition	SEAT León Cup Racer	SEP; 1	SEP; 2	SHA; 1; 12	SHA; 2; 9	VAL; 1	VAL; 2	ALG; 1	ALG; 2	MNZ; 1	MNZ; 2	SAL; 1	SAL; 2	SOC; 1	SOC; 2	RBR; 1	RBR; 2	MRN; 1	MRN; 2	CHA; 1	CHA; 2	MAC; 1	MAC; 2	40th	2
2016	Linky Racing Team	Audi S3 Saloon	BHR; 1	BHR; 2	EST; 1	EST; 2	SPA; 1	SPA; 2	IMO; 1	IMO; 2	SAL; 1	SAL; 2	OSC; 1	OSC; 2	SOC; 1	SOC; 2	CHA; 1	CHA; 2	MRN; 1	MRN; 2	SEP; 1	SEP; 2	MAC; 1; 13	MAC; 2; 11	NC	0
2017	ZZZ Team	Audi RS 3 LMS TCR	RIM; 1	RIM; 2	BHR; 1	BHR; 2	SPA; 1	SPA; 2	MNZ; 1	MNZ; 2	SAL; 1	SAL; 2	HUN; 1	HUN; 2	OSC; 1	OSC; 2	CHA; 1	CHA; 2	ZHE; 1; 16	ZHE; 2 Ret	DUB; 1	DUB; 2			NC	0
