= 2014 SEAT León Eurocup =

Seasons
- ← 2010 2015 →

The 2014 SEAT León Eurocup was the fourth season of the SEAT León Eurocup, and the first since 2010. The season was contested over six race meetings – with two races at each meeting – starting on 3 May at the Nürburgring and concluding on 2 November at the Circuit de Barcelona-Catalunya.

Baporo Motorsport drivers were able to take the top two places in the drivers' championship, with Pol Rosell taking the championship after a second-place finish in the first race at the final round of the season. Rosell achieved six podium finishes during the season, with only one win at the Salzburgring, but only missed the points on two occasions. His team-mate Manuel Gião also scored points in ten races, taking five podium finishes and two victories, coming at Monza and at the final round. Gião's final round victory allowed him to overtake Julien Briché, driving for his eponymous JSB Compétition team, for the runner-up position. Briché won races at Spa-Francorchamps and Monza, but finished fewer races. Stefano Comini and Stian Paulsen each won three races during the season, but runs of non-scoring races each cost them a shot at the championship, while the only other race winner was Ferenc Ficza, who won at Silverstone.

== Teams and drivers ==
Team	No.	Drivers	Rounds
B3R Hungary KFT	1	(Hungary) Gábor Wéber	All
B3R Hungary KFT	10	(Costa Rica) Mauricio Hernández	6
B3R Hungary KFT	87	(Hungary) Edina Bús	All
(France) JSB Compétition	2	(France) Julien Briché	All
(France) JSB Compétition	6	(France) Thibaut Mourgues	5–6
(France) JSB Compétition	21	(France) Marie Baus-Coppens	All
(Spain) Monlau Competición	3	(Spain) Jaume Font Casas	3
(Spain) Monlau Competición	4	(Spain) Alex Carbonell	All
(Spain) Monlau Competición	28	(Spain) Fran Rueda	All
(Italy) Dinamic SRL	3	(Italy) Piero Foglio	1, 4
(Italy) Dinamic SRL	67	(Italy) Marco Pellegrini	All
(Italy) Dinamic SRL	69	(Monaco) Stefano Zanini	All
(Spain) Baporo Motorsport	5	(Portugal) Manuel Gião	All
(Spain) Baporo Motorsport	12	(Spain) Pol Rosell	All
(Spain) Baporo Motorsport	13	(Andorra) Amalia Vinyes	All
(Spain) Baporo Motorsport	99	(Andorra) Joan Vinyes	4
(Italy) Target Competition	7	(Italy) Lorenzo Veglia	All
(Italy) Target Competition	10	(Costa Rica) Mauricio Hernández	5
(Italy) Target Competition	11	(Austria) Jürgen Schmarl	All
(Italy) Target Competition	24	(Netherlands) Stéphane Kox	4
(Italy) Target Competition	25	(Switzerland) Stefano Comini	All
(Spain) PCR Sport	8	(Spain) Harriet Arruabarrena	6
(Spain) PCR Sport	33	(Spain) Jordi Oriola	All
(Slovenia) LEIN Racing	17	(Serbia) Mladen Lalušić	4–6
(Slovenia) LEIN Racing	26	(Montenegro) Dejan Bulatovič	4–6
(Spain) Pujolar Racing	20	(Spain) Marcos de Diego	All
(Spain) Pujolar Racing	54	(Denmark) Thomas Fjordbach	1–2
(Spain) Pujolar Racing	54	(Spain) Antonio Martínez	3–6
(Norway) Stian Paulsen Racing	34	(Norway) Stian Paulsen	All
(Hungary) Gaspar Racing	47	(Hungary) Norbert Tóth	3–6
(Hungary) Gaspar Racing	55	(Hungary) Ferenc Ficza	All
(Portugal) Veloso Motorsport	88	(Portugal) José Monroy	1–5
(Portugal) Veloso Motorsport	88	(Denmark) Mikkel Mac	6
(Spain) SEAT	91	(United Kingdom) Piers Ward	3
(Spain) SEAT	97	(Germany) Sebastian Stahl	6
(Spain) SEAT	98	(Italy) Roberto Ferri	5
(Spain) SEAT	98	(Spain) Laia Sanz	6
(Spain) SEAT	99	(Finland) Aku Pellinen	5

== Race calendar and results ==
The series supported the Euroformula Open and International GT Open championships at all events except the Salzburgring, where the Eurocup was part of the support package for the World Touring Car Championship, at the FIA WTCC Race of Austria.

Round		Circuit	Date	Pole position	Fastest lap	Race winner	Winning team
1	R1	(Germany) Nürburgring	3 May	(Switzerland) Stefano Comini	(France) Julien Briché	(Switzerland) Stefano Comini	(Italy) Target Competition
1	R2	(Germany) Nürburgring	4 May		(Spain) Pol Rosell	(Norway) Stian Paulsen	(Norway) Stian Paulsen Racing
2	R1	(Austria) Salzburgring	24 May	(Spain) Pol Rosell	(Spain) Pol Rosell	(Norway) Stian Paulsen	(Norway) Stian Paulsen Racing
2	R2	(Austria) Salzburgring	25 May		(Spain) Marcos de Diego	(Spain) Pol Rosell	(Spain) Baporo Motorsport
3	R1	(United Kingdom) Silverstone Circuit	19 July	(Hungary) Ferenc Ficza	(Norway) Stian Paulsen	(Hungary) Ferenc Ficza	(Hungary) Gaspar Racing
3	R2	(United Kingdom) Silverstone Circuit	20 July		(Switzerland) Stefano Comini	(Switzerland) Stefano Comini	(Italy) Target Competition
4	R1	(Belgium) Circuit de Spa-Francorchamps	6 September	(France) Julien Briché	(Hungary) Gábor Wéber	(France) Julien Briché	(France) JSB Compétition
4	R2	(Belgium) Circuit de Spa-Francorchamps	7 September		(Spain) Pol Rosell	(Norway) Stian Paulsen	(Norway) Stian Paulsen Racing
5	R1	(Italy) Autodromo Nazionale Monza	27 September	(Portugal) Manuel Gião	(France) Julien Briché	(Portugal) Manuel Gião	(Spain) Baporo Motorsport
5	R2	(Italy) Autodromo Nazionale Monza	28 September		(Portugal) Manuel Gião	(France) Julien Briché	(France) JSB Compétition
6	R1	(Spain) Circuit de Barcelona-Catalunya	1 November	(Spain) Pol Rosell	(Switzerland) Stefano Comini	(Switzerland) Stefano Comini	(Italy) Target Competition
6	R2	(Spain) Circuit de Barcelona-Catalunya	2 November		(Spain) Marcos de Diego	(Portugal) Manuel Gião	(Spain) Baporo Motorsport

== Championship standings ==
Pos	Driver	NÜR (Germany)		SAL (Austria)		SIL (United Kingdom)		SPA (Belgium)		MNZ (Italy)		CAT (Spain)		Pts
1	(Spain) Pol Rosell	7	Ret	**15**^{1}	1	6^{2}	2	3	**3**	5	2	**2**^{1}	4	68
2	(Portugal) Manuel Gião	6	2	9	6	7^{3}	4	2	12	**1**^{1}	3	7	1	61
3	(France) Julien Briché	2^{3}	Ret	2	Ret	8	Ret	**1**^{1}	7	15^{2}	1	4^{2}	3	58
4	(Switzerland) Stefano Comini	**1**^{1}	13	7^{2}	5	4	1	Ret	Ret	Ret	8	1^{3}	2	56
5	(Norway) Stian Paulsen	3	1	1^{3}	Ret	2	20†	18^{3}	1	16	Ret	3	Ret	52
6	(Hungary) Ferenc Ficza	9	4	Ret	**2**	**1**^{1}	5	5	2	3^{3}	7	12	16	51
7	(Spain) Marcos de Diego	Ret	6	4	3	5	6	9	14	2	6	DNS	5	37
8	(Spain) Fran Rueda	4^{2}	3	Ret	7	9	8	10	5	10	21†	5	Ret	24
9	(Spain) Jordi Oriola	5	10	6	4	20†	7	6	9	6	9	24†	Ret	20
10	(Hungary) Gábor Wéber	Ret	Ret	8	Ret	Ret	**3**	Ret^{2}	6	8	4	9	12	18
11	(Hungary) Norbert Tóth					10	12	4	4	4	Ret	20	Ret	15
12	(Italy) Lorenzo Veglia	8	**5**	3	Ret	19†	16	7	23	14	22†	Ret	14	13
13	(Austria) Jürgen Schmarl	14	7	10	11	21†	14	13	15	13	11	6	6	8
14	(Spain) Antonio Martínez					3	Ret	Ret	8	Ret	Ret	NC	10	7
15	(Andorra) Amalia Vinyes	15	Ret	11	10	13	9	20	Ret	21	**5**	10	9	4
16	(Denmark) Thomas Fjordbach	Ret	Ret	5	9									4
17	(Spain) Alex Carbonell	Ret	11	Ret	Ret	12	11	11	10	Ret	Ret	21	7	2
18	(France) Thibaut Morgues									7	20†	16	Ret	2
19	(Costa Rica) Mauricio Hernández									20	12	8	8	2
20	(Hungary) Edina Bús	13	9	13	8	16	17	16	17	Ret	16	22	18	1
21	(France) Marie Baus-Coppens	16	8	12	12	Ret	15	17	19	11	15	23	13	1
22	(Portugal) José Monroy	10	Ret	Ret	13	11	10	12	11	9	19†			0
23	(Monaco) Stefano Zanini	11	Ret	14	14	14	13	21	20	Ret	10	15	17	0
24	(Italy) Marco Pellegrini	12	12†	Ret	Ret	15	19	15	16	12	13	17	Ret	0
25	(Denmark) Mikkel Mac											13	22	0
26	(Spain) Harriet Arruabarrena											14	15	0
27	(Montenegro) Dejan Bulatovič							19	21	17	14	18	19	0
28	(Netherlands) Stéphane Kox							14	18					0
29	(Spain) Jaume Font Casas					17	18							0
30	(Serbia) Mladen Lalušić							22	22	19	18	Ret	21	0
	(Italy) Piero Foglio	DNS	DNS					DNS	DNS					0
Guest drivers ineligible for points
	(Andorra) Joan Vinyes							8	13					
	(Germany) Sebastian Stahl											11	11	
	(Italy) Roberto Ferri									18	17			
	(United Kingdom) Piers Ward					18	Ret							
	(Spain) Laia Sanz											19	20	
	(Finland) Aku Pellinen									Ret	Ret			
Pos	Driver	NÜR (Germany)		SAL (Austria)		SIL (United Kingdom)		SPA (Belgium)		MNZ (Italy)		CAT (Spain)		Pts

Colour	Result
Gold	Winner
Silver	Second place
Bronze	Third place
Green	Points classification
Blue	Non-points classification
Blue	Non-classified finish (NC)
Purple	Retired, not classified (Ret)
Red	Did not qualify (DNQ)
Red	Did not pre-qualify (DNPQ)
Black	Disqualified (DSQ)
White	Did not start (DNS)
White	Withdrew (WD)
White	Race cancelled (C)
Blank	Did not practice (DNP)
Blank	Did not arrive (DNA)
Blank	Excluded (EX)

**Bold** – Pole
Italics – Fastest Lap
