= 2010 SEAT León Eurocup =

Seasons
- ← 2009 2014 →

The 2010 SEAT León Eurocup was the third season of the SEAT León Eurocup, a one-make racing series supporting the World Touring Car Championship.

== Teams and drivers ==
Team	No.	Drivers	Rounds
(Spain) SUNRED	1	(Spain) Diego Puyo	2–4, 6
(Spain) SUNRED	4	(Russia) Aleksey Dudukalo	All
(Spain) SUNRED	5	(Russia) Timur Sadredinov	1, 4–6
(Spain) SUNRED	12	(France) Michaël Rossi	All
(Spain) SUNRED	23	(Czech Republic) Michal Matějovský	1–5
(Spain) SUNRED	24	(Spain) Javier Ibran	1, 3, 6
(Spain) SUNRED	45	(Spain) Fernando Monje	3
(Italy) Rangoni Motorsport	2	(Italy) Massimiliano Pedala	4
(Italy) Rangoni Motorsport	3	(Italy) Salvatore Tavano	1
(Italy) Rangoni Motorsport	11	(Switzerland) Urs Sonderegger	4
(Italy) Rangoni Motorsport	14	(Italy) Aldo Ponti	1, 6
(Italy) Rangoni Motorsport	30	(Netherlands) Tim Coronel	2–3
(Italy) Rangoni Motorsport	85	(Spain) Oscar Nogués	6
(Hungary) Zengő Motorsport	6	(Portugal) Duarte Félix da Costa	All
(Hungary) Zengő Motorsport	7	(Hungary) Imre Birizdó	All
(Hungary) Zengő Motorsport	8	(Italy) Andrea Larini	All
(Hungary) Zengő Motorsport	9	(Hungary) Gábor Wéber	All
(Hungary) Zengő Motorsport	10	(Hungary) György Kontra	6
(Switzerland) Ursinho Racing by Carpi	10	(Switzerland) Fabian Eggenberger	1
(Switzerland) Ursinho Racing by Carpi	11	(Switzerland) Urs Sonderegger	1, 6
(Norway) / Stian Paulsen Racing; Paulsen Motorsport	15	(Norway) Stian Paulsen	All
(Spain) PCR Sport	16	(Spain) Marcos De Diego	All
(Hungary) Zsille Motorsport	18	(Hungary) Bálint Hatvani	1–2
(Portugal) Oasis Motorsport	20	(Portugal) Lourenço da Veiga	All
(Portugal) Oasis Motorsport	21	(Portugal) Ricardo Bravo	All
(Portugal) Oasis Motorsport	22	(Republic of Ireland) Eoin Murray	All
(France) Anome	26	(France) Stéphane Caillet	1
(France) Speed Car	27	(France) Michel Marvie	1
(France) Speed Car	28	(France) Pascal Destembert	1
(United Kingdom) Welch Motorsport	40	(United Kingdom) Daniel Welch	3
(United Kingdom) Welch Motorsport	41	(United Kingdom) David Nye	3
(United Kingdom) Advent Motorsport	44	(Sweden) Freddy Nordström	3
Team Russia	67	(Russia) Oleg Petrikov	1–2
(Spain) Monlau-Competicion	74	(Spain) Pepe Oriola	All
(Spain) Monlau-Competicion	75	(Portugal) Francisco Carvalho	All
(Spain) Monlau-Competicion	76	(Spain) David Cebrián	6
(Spain) Monlau-Competicion	77	(Spain) Josep Maria Dabad	6
(Czech Republic) Vekra Racing	80	(Czech Republic) Petr Fulín	4–5
(Spain) Baporo Motorsport	81	(Andorra) Amalia Vinyes	6
(Spain) Baporo Motorsport	82	(Spain) Pol Rosell	6
(Spain) Baporo Motorsport	83	(Spain) Miguel Toril	6
(France) Exagon Engineering	84	(France) Marlene Broggi	6
(Spain) Luis Recuenco Aranaga	86	(Spain) Luis Recuenco	6

== Race calendar and results ==
- A calendar was announced by the series on 17 December 2009. An FIA press release confirmed three dates the following day.

Round		Circuit	Date	Pole position	Fastest lap	Race winner	Winning team	Supporting
1	R1	(Italy) Autodromo Nazionale Monza	22 May	(Hungary) Gábor Wéber	(Italy) Andrea Larini	(Hungary) Gábor Wéber	(Hungary) Zengő Motorsport	FIA WTCC Race of Italy
1	R2	(Italy) Autodromo Nazionale Monza	23 May		(Portugal) Lourenço da Veiga	(France) Michaël Rossi	(Spain) SUNRED	FIA WTCC Race of Italy
2	R1	(Belgium) Zolder	19 June	(France) Michaël Rossi	(Hungary) Gábor Wéber	(Portugal) Ricardo Bravo	(Portugal) Oasis Motorsport	FIA WTCC Race of Belgium
2	R2	(Belgium) Zolder	20 June		(Portugal) Lourenço da Veiga	(Netherlands) Tim Coronel	(Italy) Rangoni Motorsport	FIA WTCC Race of Belgium
3	R1	(United Kingdom) Brands Hatch, Kent	17 July	(United Kingdom) Daniel Welch	(Republic of Ireland) Eoin Murray	(United Kingdom) Daniel Welch	(United Kingdom) Welch Motorsport	FIA WTCC Race of UK
3	R2	(United Kingdom) Brands Hatch, Kent	18 July		(Portugal) Francisco Carvalho	(Spain) Pepe Oriola	(Spain) Monlau-Competicion	FIA WTCC Race of UK
4	R1	(Czech Republic) Masaryk Circuit, Brno	31 July	(Hungary) Gábor Wéber	(Hungary) Gábor Wéber	(Hungary) Gábor Wéber	(Hungary) Zengő Motorsport	FIA WTCC Race of the Czech Republic
4	R2	(Czech Republic) Masaryk Circuit, Brno	1 August		(Spain) Diego Puyo	(Russia) Aleksey Dudukalo	(Spain) SUNRED	FIA WTCC Race of the Czech Republic
5	R1	(Germany) Motorsport Arena Oschersleben	4 September	(Hungary) Gábor Wéber	(France) Michaël Rossi	(Hungary) Gábor Wéber	(Hungary) Zengő Motorsport	FIA WTCC Race of Germany
5	R2	(Germany) Motorsport Arena Oschersleben	5 September		(Russia) Aleksey Dudukalo	(Spain) Marcos De Diego	(Spain) PCR Sport	FIA WTCC Race of Germany
6	R1	(Spain) Circuit Ricardo Tormo, Cheste	18 September	(Spain) Oscar Nogués	(Spain) Marcos De Diego	(Spain) Pepe Oriola	(Spain) Monlau-Competicion	FIA WTCC Race of Spain
6	R2	(Spain) Circuit Ricardo Tormo, Cheste	19 September		(Spain) Pepe Oriola	(Spain) Pepe Oriola	(Spain) Monlau-Competicion	FIA WTCC Race of Spain

== Championship standings ==
Pos	Driver	MNZ (Italy)		ZOL (Belgium)		BRH^{‡} (United Kingdom)		BRN (Czech Republic)		OSC (Germany)		VAL (Spain)		Pts
1	(Hungary) Gábor Wéber	**1**	DSQ	3	3	Ret	11	**1**	Ret	**1**	Ret	3	Ret	48
2	(France) Michaël Rossi	3	1	**4**	Ret	5	2	Ret	4	2	11	Ret	Ret	42
3	(Republic of Ireland) Eoin Murray	20	4	7	2	3	3	10	3	10	4	9	6	38
4	(Spain) Pepe Oriola	Ret	8	11	7	7	1	Ret	5	9	6	1	1	37
5	(Portugal) Lourenço da Veiga	6	20	2	6	6	9	Ret	7	5	3	Ret	Ret	29
6	(Portugal) Duarte Félix da Costa	10	Ret	DSQ	9	2	8	2	Ret	3	Ret	8	4	28.5
7	(Russia) Aleksey Dudukalo	2	19	5	12	14	Ret	7	1	14	5	Ret	Ret	28
8	(Spain) Marcos De Diego	5	11	9	5	12	13	8	Ret	11	1	2	8	28
9	(Italy) Andrea Larini	4	2	15	15	13	10	6	6	8	2	17	Ret	28
10	(Spain) Diego Puyo			10	11	10	6	3	2			5	5	23.5
11	(Portugal) Francisco Carvalho	14	14	Ret	10	8	4	4	Ret	6	Ret	6	3	20.5
12	(Portugal) Ricardo Bravo	8	22	1	4	9	7	Ret	Ret	12	Ret	10	7	19
13	(Norway) Stian Paulsen	Ret	17	12	16	4	5	Ret	9	4	8	Ret	10	13
14	(Netherlands) Tim Coronel			8	1	11	15							11
15	(United Kingdom) Daniel Welch					**1**	12							10
16	(Spain) Pol Rosell											7	2	10
17	(Hungary) Bálint Hatvani	11	5	6	Ret									7
18	(Switzerland) Fabian Eggenberger	18	3											6
19	(Czech Republic) Petr Fulín							5	Ret	7	Ret			6
20	(Spain) Miguel Toril											4	11	5
21	(France) Stéphane Caillet	12	6											3
22	(Russia) Oleg Petrikov	7	21	14	8									3
23	(Hungary) Imre Birizdó	9	7	Ret	14	Ret	18	9	10	13	9	18	16	2
24	(Russia) Timur Sadredinov	Ret	15					12	11	15	7	11	Ret	2
25	(Czech Republic) Michal Matějovský	16	10	13	13	Ret	16	Ret	8	Ret	10			1
26	(France) Michel Marvie	15	9											0
27	(Spain) Oscar Nogués											**Ret**	9	0
28	(Switzerland) Urs Sonderegger	17	16					11	12			19	18	0
29	(France) Pascal Destembert	13	12											0
30	(Andorra) Amalia Vinyes											12	17	0
31	(Spain) Josep Maria Dabad											Ret	12	0
32	(Spain) Javier Ibran	Ret	18			15	17					13	13	0
33	(Italy) Aldo Ponti	19	13									20	20	0
34	(Sweden) Freddy Nordström					Ret	14							0
35	(Spain) Luis Recuenco											14	15	0
36	(Hungary) György Kontra											15	14	0
37	(France) Marlene Broggi											16	19	0
38	(Spain) Fernando Monje					16	20							0
39	(United Kingdom) David Nye					Ret	19							0
40	(Spain) David Cebrián											21	21	0
	(Italy) Salvatore Tavano	DNS	DNS											0
	(Italy) Massimiliano Pedala							DSQ	EX					0
Pos	Driver	MNZ (Italy)		ZOL (Belgium)		BRH^{‡} (United Kingdom)		BRN (Czech Republic)		OSC (Germany)		VAL (Spain)		Pts

Colour	Result
Gold	Winner
Silver	Second place
Bronze	Third place
Green	Points classification
Blue	Non-points classification
Blue	Non-classified finish (NC)
Purple	Retired, not classified (Ret)
Red	Did not qualify (DNQ)
Red	Did not pre-qualify (DNPQ)
Black	Disqualified (DSQ)
White	Did not start (DNS)
White	Withdrew (WD)
White	Race cancelled (C)
Blank	Did not practice (DNP)
Blank	Did not arrive (DNA)
Blank	Excluded (EX)

**Bold** – Pole
Italics – Fastest Lap

^{‡} Half points were awarded for the second race at Brands Hatch as a result of an accident involving Francisco Carvalho on the seventh lap.
