= 2015 SEAT León Eurocup =

The 2015 SEAT León Eurocup was the fifth season of the SEAT León Eurocup. The season was contested over seven race meetings – with two races at each meeting – starting on 25 April at the Paul Ricard Circuit and concluding on 1 November at the Circuit de Barcelona-Catalunya.

Reigning champion Pol Rosell defended his championship title for the Baporo Motorsport team. Rosell won four races and recorded eight podium finishes as he finished eleven points clear of his closest rival, Stian Paulsen. Paulsen went into the final race with a shot of winning the title, but his failure to score points sealed the title for Rosell. PCR Sport driver Mikel Azcona finished third in the championship, a further eleven points in arrears. Azcona won one race during the season; the season-opener at Paul Ricard.

Six other drivers won races during 2015; Fran Rueda won the partially reversed-grid races at Paul Ricard and Estoril, with single victories taken by Wolf-Power Racing's Jonny Cocker (Silverstone), Target Competition's Loris Hezemans (Red Bull Ring), Rosell's team-mate Alex Morgan (Nürburgring), while JSB Compétition team-mates Thibaut Mourgues and Lucile Cypriano won at Monza and Catalunya respectively.

== Teams and drivers ==
Team	No.	Drivers	Rounds
(Spain) Baporo Motorsport	1	(Spain) Pol Rosell	All
(Spain) Baporo Motorsport	2	(Portugal) Manuel Gião	All
(Spain) Baporo Motorsport	13	(Andorra) Amalia Vinyes	1–2, 7
(Spain) Baporo Motorsport	22	(United Kingdom) Alex Morgan	All
(France) JSB Compétition	3	(France) Julien Briché	All
(France) JSB Compétition	5	(France) Thibaut Mourgues	3–7
(France) JSB Compétition	9	(France) Lucile Cypriano	All
(France) JSB Compétition	16	(France) Pierre-Étienne Chaumat	4–5
(France) JSB Compétition	21	(France) Marie Baus-Coppens	All
(Spain) Monlau Competición	4	(Spain) Jaume Font	1, 4–5
(Spain) Monlau Competición	4	(Spain) David Cebrián	2, 6–7
(Spain) Monlau Competición	18	(France) Jimmy Antunes	7
(Spain) Monlau Competición	25	(Thailand) Munkong Sathienthirakul	7
(Spain) Monlau Competición	28	(Spain) Fran Rueda	1–6
(Spain) PCR Sport	6	(Spain) Mikel Azcona	All
(Spain) PCR Sport	16	(Spain) Harriet Arruabarrena	7
(Spain) PCR Sport	35	(Switzerland) Urs Sonderegger	2
(Switzerland) Wolf-Power Racing	7	(Switzerland) Michel Zemp	1–3
(Switzerland) Wolf-Power Racing	8	(United Kingdom) Jonathan Cocker	3
(Switzerland) Wolf-Power Racing	8	(South Africa) Shane Williams	4–7
(Italy) Target Competition	10	(Costa Rica) Mauricio Hernández	All
(Italy) Target Competition	11	(Austria) Jürgen Schmarl	All
(Italy) Target Competition	24	(Switzerland) Andrina Gugger	1–6
(Italy) Target Competition	24	(Netherlands) Niels Langeveld	7
(Italy) Target Competition	33	(Spain) Jordi Oriola	All
(Italy) Target Competition	50	(Netherlands) Loris Hezemans	4
(Slovenia) LEIN Racing	12	(Montenegro) Dejan Bulatovič	1–4, 7
(Slovenia) LEIN Racing	17	(Serbia) Mladen Lalušić	1–4, 7
B3 Hungary KFT	15	(Hungary) Norbert Kiss	4
B3 Hungary KFT	19	(Hungary) Attila Tassi	5–7
B3 Hungary KFT	37	(Hungary) Dominik Fekete	1–4
B3 Hungary KFT	87	(Hungary) Edina Bús	1, 3–7
Privateer	15	(France) Jérémie Lesoudier	7
Privateer	26	(Italy) Antonio D'Amico	7
(Portugal) LBV	20	(Portugal) Lourenço Beirão	All
(Italy) Dinamic SRL	23	(Monaco) Stefano Zanini	All
(Italy) Dinamic SRL	67	(Italy) Marco Pellegrini	All
(Norway) Stian Paulsen Racing	34	(Norway) Stian Paulsen	All
(France) Motorsport Development	38	(France) Gaël Castelli	4
(France) Motorsport Development	73	(France) Clément Mateu	1–3, 6–7
(France) Motorsport Development	76	(France) Julien Rodrigues	2
(France) Motorsport Development	77	(France) Jean-Laurent Navarro	All
(Spain) SEAT Sport	44	(Spain) Laia Sanz	7
(Spain) SEAT Sport	99	(Italy) Alberto Bassi	7
(Belgium) Allure Team	45	(Belgium) Guillaume Mondron	1, 5
(Hungary) Zengő Motorsport	46	(Hungary) Zsolt Szabó	1–4
SEAT Austria	61	(Austria) Mario Dablander	All
(United Kingdom) VFR Racing	88	(United Kingdom) Finlay Crocker	3–6

== Race calendar and results ==
All rounds were part of the International GT Open weekends, except for the Nürburgring event, which supported the Blancpain Endurance Series.

Round		Circuit	Date	Pole position	Fastest lap	Race winner	Winning team
1	R1	(France) Circuit Paul Ricard	25 April	(Spain) Mikel Azcona	(Spain) Mikel Azcona	(Spain) Mikel Azcona	(Spain) PCR Sport
1	R2	(France) Circuit Paul Ricard	26 April		(France) Julien Briché	(Spain) Fran Rueda	(Spain) Monlau Competición
2	R1	(Portugal) Autódromo do Estoril	9 May	(France) Lucile Cypriano	(Austria) Mario Dablander	(Spain) Pol Rosell	(Spain) Baporo Motorsport
2	R2	(Portugal) Autódromo do Estoril	10 May		(Switzerland) Andrina Gugger	(Spain) Fran Rueda	(Spain) Monlau Competición
3	R1	(United Kingdom) Silverstone Circuit	6 June	(Norway) Stian Paulsen	(Spain) Mikel Azcona	(Norway) Stian Paulsen	(Norway) Stian Paulsen Racing
3	R2	(United Kingdom) Silverstone Circuit	7 June		(France) Julien Briché	(United Kingdom) Jonathan Cocker	(Switzerland) Wolf-Power Racing
4	R1	(Austria) Red Bull Ring	4 July	(Netherlands) Loris Hezemans	(Netherlands) Loris Hezemans	(Netherlands) Loris Hezemans	(Italy) Target Competition
4	R2	(Austria) Red Bull Ring	5 July		(Spain) Pol Rosell	(Spain) Pol Rosell	(Spain) Baporo Motorsport
5	R1	(Germany) Nürburgring	19 September	(Norway) Stian Paulsen	(Norway) Stian Paulsen	(Norway) Stian Paulsen	(Norway) Stian Paulsen Racing
5	R2	(Germany) Nürburgring	20 September		(Spain) Mikel Azcona	(United Kingdom) Alex Morgan	(Spain) Baporo Motorsport
6	R1	(Italy) Autodromo Nazionale Monza	3 October	(France) Julien Briché	(Portugal) Manuel Gião	(France) Thibaut Mourgues	(France) JSB Compétition
6	R2	(Italy) Autodromo Nazionale Monza	4 October		(Spain) Mikel Azcona	(Spain) Pol Rosell	(Spain) Baporo Motorsport
7	R1	(Spain) Circuit de Barcelona-Catalunya	31 October	(Spain) Mikel Azcona	(Spain) Mikel Azcona	(Spain) Pol Rosell	(Spain) Baporo Motorsport
7	R2	(Spain) Circuit de Barcelona-Catalunya	1 November		(France) Julien Briché	(France) Lucile Cypriano	(France) JSB Compétition

== Championship standings ==
Pos	Driver	LEC (France)		EST (Portugal)		SIL (United Kingdom)		RBR (Austria)		NÜR (Germany)		MNZ (Italy)		CAT (Spain)		Pts
1	(Spain) Pol Rosell	3	2	1^{2}	3	2^{2}	12	5	1	7	Ret	5	1	1^{2}	5	88
2	(Norway) Stian Paulsen	2	6	2	5	**1**^{1}	5	3	5	**1**^{1}	25	6	3	4	21	77
3	(Spain) Mikel Azcona	**1**^{1}	4	4^{3}	10	3^{3}	6	6^{2}	Ret	3^{2}	6	12	4	**2**^{1}	Ret	66
4	(France) Julien Briché	Ret^{2}	3	5	2	7	4	9	4	Ret	16	**2**^{1}	9	Ret	7	45
5	(United Kingdom) Alex Morgan	5	8	Ret	6	4	2	10	6	17	1	8	8	5	6	43
6	(Spain) Jordi Oriola	7^{3}	7	8	11	6	3	14	10	6	3	4	2	10	Ret	37
7	(Austria) Mario Dablander	10	5	6	4	12	23	8	2	5	2	Ret^{2}	12	Ret	9	35
8	(Spain) Fran Rueda	4	1	7	1	10	Ret	22	7	Ret	4	9	Ret			34
9	(France) Lucile Cypriano	8	Ret	**3**^{1}	14	11	8	11	Ret	12	9	3	7	9	1	29
10	(South Africa) Shane Williams							2^{3}	3	4	5	Ret	Ret	Ret	20	24
11	(Costa Rica) Mauricio Hernández	6	Ret	Ret	Ret	Ret	10	7	Ret	2^{3}	7	11	Ret	Ret	8	17
12	(France) Thibaut Mourgues					14	7	17	DSQ	8	11	1^{3}	11	8	Ret	15
13	(Portugal) Manuel Gião	9	10	Ret	Ret	5	Ret	12	9	10	12	7	18	13	2	14
14	(Netherlands) Loris Hezemans							**1**^{1}	15							13
15	(Spain) David Cebrián			9	8							18	6	6	4	12
16	(United Kingdom) Jonathan Cocker					8	1									11
17	(Netherlands) Niels Langeveld													3^{3}	10	7
18	(France) Jimmy Antunes													Ret	3	6
19	(Hungary) Norbert Kiss							4	Ret							5
20	(Austria) Jürgen Schmarl	11	9	12	16	13	11	13	8	11	10	16	5	Ret	Ret	5
21	(Switzerland) Andrina Gugger	18	21	13	7	17	25	19	14	9	13	Ret	Ret			2
22	(Monaco) Stefano Zanini	17	18	11	18	19	21	21	Ret	13	17	DNS	DNS	7	DSQ	2
23	(Portugal) Lourenço Beirão	Ret	Ret	10	Ret	9	9	15	11	14	8	Ret	13	Ret	13	1
24	(Hungary) Zsolt Szabó	16	Ret	16	9	16	13	16	Ret							0
25	(Hungary) Attila Tassi									21	14	10	10	12	Ret	0
26	(Andorra) Amalia Vinyes	12	11	15	12									NC	Ret	0
27	(Italy) Marco Pellegrini	Ret	18	Ret	15	Ret	17	28	19	DNS	18	13	15	11	Ret	0
28	(Thailand) Munkong Sathienthirakul													14	11	0
29	(Hungary) Edina Bús	Ret	20			15	15	20	12	22	24	15	17	Ret	22	0
30	(Belgium) Guillaume Mondron	Ret	12							15	15					0
31	(France) Clément Mateu	21	19	21	13	22	20					14	19	Ret	Ret	0
32	(Spain) Jaume Font	13	Ret					18	20	20	21					0
33	(France) Pierre-Étienne Chaumat							24	13	19	19					0
34	(France) Jean-Laurent Navarro	15	16	14	Ret	26	19	Ret	Ret	16	20	Ret	14	Ret	Ret	0
35	(Switzerland) Michel Zemp	Ret	14	17	Ret	20	14									0
36	(France) Marie Baus-Coppens	20	15	20	Ret	21	18	23	Ret	23	22	Ret	DNS	15	14	0
37	(Montenegro) Dejan Bulatovič	14	17	Ret	Ret	18	16	27	Ret					18	15	0
38	(United Kingdom) Finlay Crocker					24	22	26	16	18	23	17	16			0
39	(Spain) Harriet Arruabarrena													16	17	0
40	(France) Jérémie Lesoudier													Ret	16	0
41	(Hungary) Dominik Fekete	19	Ret	19	17	23	24	25	18							0
42	(Serbia) Mladen Lalušić	Ret	22	22	Ret	25	26	Ret	17					19	19	0
43	(France) Julien Rodrigues			18	Ret											0
	(France) Gaël Castelli							Ret	Ret							0
	(Italy) Antonio D'Amico													Ret	DNS	0
Guest drivers ineligible for championship points
	(Spain) Laia Sanz													17	12	0
	(Italy) Alberto Bassi													Ret	18	0
Pos	Driver	LEC (France)		EST (Portugal)		SIL (United Kingdom)		RBR (Austria)		NÜR (Germany)		MNZ (Italy)		CAT (Spain)		Pts

Colour	Result
Gold	Winner
Silver	Second place
Bronze	Third place
Green	Points classification
Blue	Non-points classification
Blue	Non-classified finish (NC)
Purple	Retired, not classified (Ret)
Red	Did not qualify (DNQ)
Red	Did not pre-qualify (DNPQ)
Black	Disqualified (DSQ)
White	Did not start (DNS)
White	Withdrew (WD)
White	Race cancelled (C)
Blank	Did not practice (DNP)
Blank	Did not arrive (DNA)
Blank	Excluded (EX)

**Bold** – Pole
Italics – Fastest Lap
