= 2026 TCR World Tour =

Motorsport contest

The 2026 Kumho FIA TCR World Tour was the fourth season of the TCR World Tour, an international touring car racing series for TCR cars. Effectively succeeding the WTCR series, it was also the twelfth season of international TCR competition dating back to the 2015 TCR International Series.

The season consisted of eight events selected from a number of TCR series worldwide.

== Calendar ==
The championship was initially scheduled be contested over 8 rounds in Europe and Asia.

| Round | Race | Circuit | Date | Supporting Programm |
|---|---|---|---|---|
| 1 | 1 | Misano World Circuit, Emilia-Romagna, Italy (Grand Prix Circuit) | 8–10 May | Italian GT Endurance Cup; Italian F4 Championship; Porsche Carrera Cup Italia; GT4 Italian Series |
| 1 | 2 | Misano World Circuit, Emilia-Romagna, Italy (Grand Prix Circuit) | 8–10 May | Italian GT Endurance Cup; Italian F4 Championship; Porsche Carrera Cup Italia; GT4 Italian Series |
| 2 | 3 | Circuit Ricardo Tormo, Cheste, Spain (External Circuit) | 12–14 June | TCR Spain Touring Car Championship; Porsche Sprint Challenge Ibérica; Copa Clio España; Spanish Drift Championship |
| 2 | 4 | Circuit Ricardo Tormo, Cheste, Spain (External Circuit) | 12–14 June | TCR Spain Touring Car Championship; Porsche Sprint Challenge Ibérica; Copa Clio España; Spanish Drift Championship |
| 2 | 5 | Circuit Ricardo Tormo, Cheste, Spain (External Circuit) | 12–14 June | TCR Spain Touring Car Championship; Porsche Sprint Challenge Ibérica; Copa Clio España; Spanish Drift Championship |
| 3 | 6 | Circuit Paul Ricard, Le Castellet, France (Short Circuit with Mistral Chicane) | 4–5 July | Iberian Historic Endurance; 400km Paul Ricard |
| 3 | 7 | Circuit Paul Ricard, Le Castellet, France (Short Circuit with Mistral Chicane) | 4–5 July | Iberian Historic Endurance; 400km Paul Ricard |
| 4 | 8 | Circuito Internacional de Vila Real, Vila Real, Portugal (Full Circuit) | 11–12 July | Campeonato de Portugal de Velocidade; 55° Circuito Internacional de Vila Real |
| 4 | 9 | Circuito Internacional de Vila Real, Vila Real, Portugal (Full Circuit) | 11–12 July | Campeonato de Portugal de Velocidade; 55° Circuito Internacional de Vila Real |
| 5 | 10 | Inje Speedium, Inje, South Korea (Full Circuit) | 2–4 October | TCR Asia Series |
| 5 | 11 | Inje Speedium, Inje, South Korea (Full Circuit) | 2–4 October | TCR Asia Series |
| 5 | 12 | Inje Speedium, Inje, South Korea (Full Circuit) | 2–4 October | TCR Asia Series |
| 6 | 13 | Chengdu Tianfu International Circuit, Jianyang, China (Full Circuit) | 16–18 October | TCR Asia Series; TCR China Touring Car Championship; CH3OH GEELY SUPER CUP PRO; Lotus China Cup |
| 6 | 14 | Chengdu Tianfu International Circuit, Jianyang, China (Full Circuit) | 16–18 October | TCR Asia Series; TCR China Touring Car Championship; CH3OH GEELY SUPER CUP PRO; Lotus China Cup |
| 6 | 15 | Chengdu Tianfu International Circuit, Jianyang, China (Full Circuit) | 16–18 October | TCR Asia Series; TCR China Touring Car Championship; CH3OH GEELY SUPER CUP PRO; Lotus China Cup |
| 7 | 16 | Zhejiang International Circuit, Zhejiang, Shaoxing, China (Full Circuit) | 23–25 October | TCR Asia Series; TCR China Touring Car Championship |
| 7 | 17 | Zhejiang International Circuit, Zhejiang, Shaoxing, China (Full Circuit) | 23–25 October | TCR Asia Series; TCR China Touring Car Championship |
| 7 | 18 | Zhejiang International Circuit, Zhejiang, Shaoxing, China (Full Circuit) | 23–25 October | TCR Asia Series; TCR China Touring Car Championship |
| 8 | 19 | Guia Circuit, Macau Peninsula, Macau (Grand Prix Circuit) | 19–22 November | Macau Guia Race; TCR Asia Series; FIA FR World Cup; FIA F4 World Cup; FIA GT World Cup; Macau Motorcycle Grand Prix |
| 8 | 20 | Guia Circuit, Macau Peninsula, Macau (Grand Prix Circuit) | 19–22 November | Macau Guia Race; TCR Asia Series; FIA FR World Cup; FIA F4 World Cup; FIA GT World Cup; Macau Motorcycle Grand Prix |

== Teams and drivers ==
| Team | Car | No. | Drivers | Class | Rounds | Ref. |
|---|---|---|---|---|---|---|
| (China) Z.Speed | Hyundai Elantra N TCR | 3 | (China) Bofei Zhang | | 6 | |
| (China) Z.Speed | Hyundai Elantra N TCR | 56 | (Indonesia) Benny Santoso | | 8 | |
| (China) Z.Speed | Hyundai Elantra N TCR | 77 | (China) Yate Tu | | 5 | |
| (China) Z.Speed | Hyundai Elantra N TCR (2024) | 69 | (Chinese Taipei) Andy Liang | | 6–8 | |
| (Hong Kong) Team TRC | Honda Civic Type R TCR (FL5) | 6 | (Hong Kong) Frederick Lee | | 8 | |
| (Hong Kong) Team TRC | Honda Civic Type R TCR (FL5) | 19 | (Hong Kong) William Cheung | | 6–8 | |
| (Hong Kong) Team TRC | Honda Civic Type R TCR (FL5) | 29 | (Hong Kong) Euan Chan | | 6–8 | |
| (China) Spark Racing | Honda Civic Type R TCR (FL5) | 8 | (China) Juran Sun | | 8 | |
| (China) Spark Racing | Honda Civic Type R TCR (FL5) | 37 | (China) Yunjie Zhou | | 8 | |
| (Spain) Monlau Motorsport | Cupra León VZ TCR | 10 | (Sweden) Viktor Andersson | | 1–2 | |
| (Spain) Monlau Motorsport | Cupra León VZ TCR | 420 | (Argentina) Sebastián Quirno | | 2 | |
| (France) SP Compétition | Cupra León VZ TCR | 10 | (Sweden) Viktor Andersson | | 4–5 | |
| (France) SP Compétition | Cupra León VZ TCR | 22 | (France) Gilles Chauvin | | 3 | |
| (France) SP Compétition | Cupra León VZ TCR | 107 | (France) Aurélien Comte | W | All | |
| (France) SP Compétition | Cupra León VZ TCR | 169 | (France) Jean-Karl Vernay | W | 1, 5–8 | |
| (France) SP Compétition | Cupra León VZ TCR | 170 | (France) Tom Pussier | | 3 | |
| (France) SP Compétition | Cupra León VZ TCR | 412 | (Russia) Mikhail Simonov | | 8 | |
| (France) SP Compétition | Cupra León VZ TCR | 422 | (Brazil) Celso Neto | | 8 | |
| (France) SP Compétition | Cupra León VZ TCR | 472 | (Italy) Sandro Pelatti | | 2 | |
| (France) SP Compétition | Cupra León VZ TCR | 419 | (Brazil) Enzo Gianfratti | | 4 | |
| (Spain) DSOEM Motorsport | Cupra León VZ TCR | 419 | (Brazil) Enzo Gianfratti | | 2 | |
| (Italy) BRC Hyundai N Squadra Corse | Hyundai Elantra N TCR | 12 | (Italy) Gabriele Covini | | 1–2 | |
| (Italy) BRC Hyundai N Squadra Corse | Hyundai Elantra N EV TCR | 105 | (Hungary) Norbert Michelisz | W | All | |
| (Italy) BRC Hyundai N Squadra Corse | Hyundai Elantra N EV TCR | 196 | (Spain) Mikel Azcona | W | All | |
| (Italy) BRC Hyundai N Squadra Corse | Hyundai Elantra N EV TCR | 429 | (Argentina) Néstor Girolami | | 8 | |
| (United Kingdom) Vannin Motorsport | Audi RS 3 LMS TCR (2021) | 13 | (Portugal) Manuel Fernandes | | 2–4 | |
| (United Kingdom) Vannin Motorsport | Audi RS 3 LMS TCR (2021) | 15 | (United Kingdom) Luke Sargeant | | 2 | |
| (United Kingdom) Vannin Motorsport | Audi RS 3 LMS TCR (2021) | 34 | (Norway) Stian Paulsen | | 4 | |
| (United Kingdom) Vannin Motorsport | Audi RS 3 LMS TCR (2021) | 476 | (France) Julien Piguet | | 8 | |
| (South Korea) Russell Motorsport | Hyundai Elantra N TCR (2024) | 18 | (South Korea) Jeongmin An | | 5 | |
| (South Korea) Russell Motorsport | Hyundai i30 N TCR | 82 | (South Korea) Yul Lee | | 5 | |
| (China) PGsica - Blue Racing | Audi RS 3 LMS TCR (2017) | 20 | (China) Jiajun Li | | 5, 7–8 | |
| (China) PGsica - Blue Racing | Volkswagen Golf GTI TCR | 620 | (China) Zheming Zhuang | | 6 | |
| (Hong Kong) Evolve Racing | Hyundai Elantra N TCR | 21 | (Hong Kong) Bayern Yip | | 5–7 | |
| (Hong Kong) Evolve Racing | Hyundai Elantra N TCR | 28 | (Hong Kong) Lo Sze Ho | | 5–8 | |
| (Ecuador) ATE Racing by DM23 | Honda Civic Type R TCR (FL5) | 23 | (Ecuador) Diego Moran | | 5–7 | |
| (France) JSB Compétition | Hyundai Elantra N TCR (2024) | 24 | (France) Julien Briché | | 1–3 | |
| (France) JSB Compétition | Hyundai Elantra N TCR | 145 | (France) Raphäel Fournier | | 1–3 | |
| (China) Norris Racing | Honda Civic Type R TCR (FK7) | 26 | (Hong Kong) Tony Chan | | 7–8 | |
| (Estonia) ALM Motorsport | Honda Civic Type R TCR (FL5) | 27 | (Estonia) Ruben Volt | | 1 | |
| (Estonia) ALM Motorsport | Honda Civic Type R TCR (FL5) | 120 | (France) Teddy Clairet | W | 1 | |
| (Estonia) ALM Motorsport | Honda Civic Type R TCR (FL5) | 121 | (France) Jimmy Clairet | W | 2 | |
| (Estonia) ALM Motorsport | Honda Civic Type R TCR (FL5) | 148 | (Sweden) Mikael Karlsson | | 4 | |
| (Estonia) ALM Motorsport | Honda Civic Type R TCR (FL5) | 246 | (United Kingdom) Jenson Brickley | W | 1–4 | |
| (Estonia) ALM Motorsport | Honda Civic Type R TCR (FL5) | 405 | (Turkey) Demir Eröge | | 2 | |
| (Estonia) ALM Motorsport | Honda Civic Type R TCR (FL5) | 437 | (Estonia) Sten Dorian Piirimägi | | 2 | |
| (Estonia) ALM Motorsport | Honda Civic Type R TCR (FL5) | 441 | (Denmark) René Povlsen | | 2 | |
| (Macau) MacPro Racing Team | Honda Civic Type R TCR (FL5) | 30 | (Macau) Raymond Liu | | 7 | |
| (Macau) MacPro Racing Team | Honda Civic Type R TCR (FL5) | 87 | (Hong Kong) Siuming Man | | 8 | |
| (Macau) MacPro Racing Team | Honda Civic Type R TCR (FL5) | 802 | (Macau) Marcus Cheong | | 6, 8 | |
| (China) Chengdu 34 Car Park Racing | Audi RS 3 LMS TCR (2017) | 33 | (China) Shuyan Tang | | 6 | |
| (China) Jiren Motorsport | Audi RS 3 LMS TCR (2021) | 45 | (China) Fu Bin | | 7 | |
| (Portugal) JT59 Racing Team | Hyundai Elantra N TCR | 59 | (Portugal) Daniel Teixeira | | 4 | |
| (China) Lynk & Co Teamwork Motorsport | Lynk & Co 03+ TCR | 66 | (Hong Kong) Li Guanghua | | 8 | |
| (China) Lynk & Co Teamwork Motorsport | Lynk & Co 03+ TCR | 68 | (Hong Kong) Sunny Wong | | 8 | |
| (China) Lynk & Co Teamwork Motorsport | Lynk & Co 03+ TCR | 145 | (France) Raphäel Fournier | | 8 | |
| (Italy) MM Motorsport | Honda Civic Type R TCR (FL5) | 72 | (Argentina) Ramiro Zago | | 1 | |
| (France) Herrero Racing | Cupra León VZ TCR | 74 | (France) Victor Weyrich | | 3 | |
| (China) GYT Racing Team | Audi RS 3 LMS TCR (2021) | 77 | (China) Yate Tu | | 8 | |
| (Italy) Trico WRT | Hyundai Elantra N TCR | 81 | (Italy) Damiano Reduzzi | | 1–3 | |
| (China) Zhongshan SRC | Audi RS 3 LMS TCR (2017) | 85 | (China) Jiucheng Wu | | 5 | |
| (South Korea) Solite Indigo Racing | Hyundai Elantra N TCR | 97 | (South Korea) Park June-sung | | 5 | |
| (China) Mulberry Racing | Hyundai Elantra N TCR | 99 | (China) Hongzhi Liu | | 8 | |
| (China) Geely Cyan Racing | Geely Preface TCR | 111 | (Sweden) Thed Björk | W | All | |
| (China) Geely Cyan Racing | Geely Preface TCR | 155 | (China) Ma Qing Hua | W | All | |
| (China) Geely Cyan Racing | Geely Preface TCR | 168 | (France) Yann Ehrlacher | W | All | |
| (China) Geely Cyan Racing | Geely Preface TCR | 181 | (Uruguay) Santiago Urrutia | W | All | |
| (France) Team Clairet Sport | Cupra León VZ TCR | 120 | (France) Teddy Clairet | W | 3 | |
| (France) Team Clairet Sport | Cupra León VZ TCR | 433 | (France) Samuel Chaligne | | 2 | |
| (France) Team Clairet Sport | Audi RS 3 LMS TCR (2021) | 121 | (France) Jimmy Clairet | W | 4, 8 | |
| (France) Team Clairet Sport | Audi RS 3 LMS TCR (2021) | 431 | (France) Mathieu Casalonga | | 2, 4 | |
| (France) Team Clairet Sport | Audi RS 3 LMS TCR (2021) | 481 | (Spain) Erik Zabala | | 2 | |
| (Spain) GOAT Racing | Honda Civic Type R TCR (FL5) | 186 | (Argentina) Esteban Guerrieri | W | 1 | |
| (Spain) RX Pro Racing | Audi RS 3 LMS TCR (2021) | 411 | (Spain) Busián Fontán | | 2 | |

| Icon | Status |
|---|---|
| W | TCR World Tour entries not eligible to score points in the local series |

== Results ==
| Rnd. | | Circuit/Location | Pole position | Fastest lap | Winning driver | Winning team | Winning brand |
|---|---|---|---|---|---|---|---|
| 1 | 1 | (Italy) Misano World Circuit | (Spain) Mikel Azcona | (Spain) Mikel Azcona | (Hungary) Norbert Michelisz | (Italy) BRC Hyundai N Squadra Corse | (South Korea) Hyundai N |
| 1 | 2 | (Italy) Misano World Circuit | | (Uruguay) Santiago Urrutia | (China) Ma Qing Hua | (China) Geely Cyan Racing | (China) Geely |
| 2 | 3 | (Spain) Circuit Ricardo Tormo | (France) Yann Ehrlacher | (France) Yann Ehrlacher | (Uruguay) Santiago Urrutia | (China) Geely Cyan Racing | (China) Geely |
| 2 | 4 | (Spain) Circuit Ricardo Tormo | | (Uruguay) Santiago Urrutia | (Uruguay) Santiago Urrutia | (China) Geely Cyan Racing | (China) Geely |
| 2 | 5 | (Spain) Circuit Ricardo Tormo | | (Uruguay) Santiago Urrutia | (Uruguay) Santiago Urrutia | (China) Geely Cyan Racing | (China) Geely |
| 3 | 6 | (France) Circuit Paul Ricard | (Spain) Mikel Azcona | (Spain) Mikel Azcona | (Spain) Mikel Azcona | (Italy) BRC Hyundai N Squadra Corse | (South Korea) Hyundai N |
| 3 | 7 | (France) Circuit Paul Ricard | | (France) Teddy Clairet | (France) Teddy Clairet | (France) Team Clairet Sport | (Spain) Cupra |
| 4 | 8 | (Portugal) Circuito Internacional de Vila Real | (Spain) Mikel Azcona | (France) Yann Ehrlacher | (France) Yann Ehrlacher | (China) Geely Cyan Racing | (China) Geely |
| 4 | 9 | (Portugal) Circuito Internacional de Vila Real | | (Hungary) Norbert Michelisz | (Hungary) Norbert Michelisz | (Italy) BRC Hyundai N Squadra Corse | (South Korea) Hyundai N |
| 5 | 10 | (South Korea) Inje Speedium | (Spain) Mikel Azcona | (Sweden) Thed Björk | (Spain) Mikel Azcona | (Italy) BRC Hyundai N Squadra Corse | (South Korea) Hyundai N |
| 5 | 11 | (South Korea) Inje Speedium | | (China) Ma Qing Hua | (Sweden) Viktor Andersson | (France) SP Compétition | (Spain) Cupra |
| 5 | 12 | (South Korea) Inje Speedium | | (Spain) Mikel Azcona | (Spain) Mikel Azcona | (Italy) BRC Hyundai N Squadra Corse | (South Korea) Hyundai N |
| 6 | 13 | (China) Chengdu Tianfu International Circuit | (France) Yann Ehrlacher | (France) Yann Ehrlacher | (Uruguay) Santiago Urrutia | (China) Geely Cyan Racing | (China) Geely |
| 6 | 14 | (China) Chengdu Tianfu International Circuit | | (France) Aurélien Comte | (France) Aurélien Comte | (France) SP Compétition | (Spain) Cupra |
| 6 | 15 | (China) Chengdu Tianfu International Circuit | | (Uruguay) Santiago Urrutia | (Uruguay) Santiago Urrutia | (China) Geely Cyan Racing | (China) Geely |
| 7 | 16 | (China) Zhejiang International Circuit | (Hungary) Norbert Michelisz | (Hungary) Norbert Michelisz | (Spain) Mikel Azcona | (Italy) BRC Hyundai N Squadra Corse | (South Korea) Hyundai N |
| 7 | 17 | (China) Zhejiang International Circuit | | (France) Aurélien Comte | (France) Aurélien Comte | (France) SP Compétition | (Spain) Cupra |
| 7 | 18 | (China) Zhejiang International Circuit | | (Sweden) Thed Björk | (Spain) Mikel Azcona | (Italy) BRC Hyundai N Squadra Corse | (South Korea) Hyundai N |
| 8 | 19 | (Macau) Guia Circuit | | | | | |
| 8 | 20 | (Macau) Guia Circuit | | | | | |

== Points standings ==
Scoring systems

| Position | 1st | 2nd | 3rd | 4th | 5th | 6th | 7th | 8th | 9th | 10th | 11th | 12th | 13th | 14th | 15th |
|---|---|---|---|---|---|---|---|---|---|---|---|---|---|---|---|
| Qualification | 15 | 10 | 8 | 6 | 4 | 2 | | | | | | | | | |
| All race Points | 30 | 25 | 22 | 20 | 18 | 16 | 14 | 12 | 10 | 8 | 6 | 4 | 3 | 2 | 1 |

=== Drivers ===
| Pos. | Driver | MIS (Italy) | | VAL (Spain) | | | LEC (France) | | VIL (Portugal) | | INJ (South Korea) | | | CHE (China) | | | ZHJ (China) | | | GUI (Macau) | | Pts. |
|---|---|---|---|---|---|---|---|---|---|---|---|---|---|---|---|---|---|---|---|---|---|---|
| 1 | (Spain) Mikel Azcona | **2**^{1} | 2 | 19^{4} | 5 | 3 | **1**^{1} | 4 | **2**^{1} | 12 | **1**^{1} | 7 | 1 | 4^{2} | 7 | 4 | 1^{2} | 14 | 1 | 2^{2} | 10 | 488 |
| 2 | (Uruguay) Santiago Urrutia | 4^{4} | 6 | 1^{3} | 1 | 1 | 6^{5} | 3 | 3^{4} | 4 | 9^{4} | Ret | 7 | 1^{3} | 3 | 1 | 3^{3} | 5 | 10 | **1**^{1} | 7 | 465 |
| 3 | (Hungary) Norbert Michelisz | 1^{2} | Ret | 4^{5} | 3 | 4 | 3^{3} | 7 | 5 | 1 | 3^{2} | 6 | 3 | 5^{4} | 5 | 8 | **2**^{1} | 2 | 2 | 3^{4} | 3 | 462 |
| 4 | (Sweden) Thed Björk | 5^{5} | 3 | 2^{2} | 6 | 2 | 13 | 5 | Ret | 7 | 2^{3} | 4 | 2 | 6 | 4 | 7 | 4 | 3 | 3 | 6 | 2 | 394 |
| 5 | (France) Aurélien Comte | 6 | 4 | 3^{6} | 2 | 5 | 4 | Ret | 6^{5} | 2 | 4^{6} | Ret | 5 | 7^{6} | 1 | 5 | 6^{6} | 1 | 6 | 8 | 8 | 360 |
| 6 | (France) Yann Ehrlacher | 3^{3} | 5 | **Ret**^{1} | Ret | 7 | 2^{2} | 6 | 1^{2} | 5 | 6^{5} | Ret | 4 | **2**^{1} | 8 | 2 | 14^{5} | 12 | 4 | 12^{3} | 9 | 355 |
| 7 | (China) Ma Qing Hua | 8 | 1 | Ret | 4 | Ret | 7 | 2 | 4^{3} | 6 | 10 | 2 | 8 | 8^{5} | 6 | 6 | 5^{4} | 11 | 5 | 7 | 1 | 330 |
| 8 | (France) Jean-Karl Vernay | 9 | 14 | | | | | | | | 8 | 5 | 9 | 3 | 2 | 3 | 7 | 4 | Ret | Ret | 6 | 171 |
| 9 | (Sweden) Viktor Andersson | 11 | Ret | 5 | 8 | 6 | | | 7^{6} | 3 | 7 | 1 | 6 | | | | | | | | | 150 |
| 10 | (Hong Kong) Lo Sze Ho | | | | | | | | | | 15 | 9 | 11 | 10 | 9 | 15 | 8 | 6 | 7 | Ret | 12 | 82 |
| 11 | (Ecuador) Diego Moran | | | | | | | | | | 11 | 8 | 10 | 9 | 16 | 10 | 9 | 7 | 8 | | | 80 |
| 12 | (United Kingdom) Jenson Brickley | Ret | 8 | 6 | 22 | 19 | 11^{6} | 8 | 8 | 8 | | | | | | | | | | | | 72 |
| 13 | (Hong Kong) Bayern Yip | | | | | | | | | | 12 | 10 | 12 | 11 | 10 | 9 | 10 | 16 | 9 | | | 58 |
| 14 | (France) Teddy Clairet | 13 | 16 | | | | 5^{4} | 1 | | | | | | | | | | | | | | 51 |
| 15 | (Argentina) Néstor Girolami | | | | | | | | | | | | | | | | | | | 4^{5} | 5 | 42 |
| 16 | (South Korea) Park June-sung | | | | | | | | | | 5 | 3 | Ret | | | | | | | | | 40 |
| 17 | (Russia) Mikhail Simonov | | | | | | | | | | | | | | | | | | | 5^{6} | 4 | 40 |
| 18 | (France) Julien Briché | 17 | 13 | 7 | Ret | 9 | 8 | Ret | | | | | | | | | | | | | | 39 |
| 19 | (Brazil) Enzo Gianfratti | | | 9 | 9 | DNS | | | 10 | 11 | | | | | | | | | | | | 34 |
| 20 | (France) Jimmy Clairet | | | 23 | 7 | 8 | | | Ret | Ret | | | | | | | | | | 14 | 13 | 31 |
| 21 | (Hong Kong) Euan Chan | | | | | | | | | | | | | 12 | 12 | 12 | 12 | 9 | 14 | 15 | 15 | 30 |
| 22 | (Argentina) Esteban Guerrieri | 7 | 7 | | | | | | | | | | | | | | | | | | | 28 |
| 23 | (Portugal) Manuel Fernandes | | | Ret | Ret | 17 | Ret | 9 | 9 | 10 | | | | | | | | | | | | 28 |
| 24 | (Italy) Gabriele Covini | 10 | 11 | 22 | 10 | 12 | | | | | | | | | | | | | | | | 26 |
| 25 | (Italy) Damiano Reduzzi | 14 | 15 | 13 | 16 | 16 | 9 | 10 | | | | | | | | | | | | | | 24 |
| 26 | (Macau) Marcus Cheong | | | | | | | | | | | | | 13 | 11 | 11 | | | | 11 | 14 | 23 |
| 27 | (Estonia) Sten Dorian Piirimägi | | | 8 | 15 | 10 | | | | | | | | | | | | | | | | 21 |
| 28 | (France) Raphaël Fournier | 16 | 12 | 14 | 13 | 14 | Ret | 11 | | | | | | | | | | | | 13 | 16 | 20 |
| 29 | (Macau) Raymond Liu | | | | | | | | | | | | | | | | 11 | 8 | Ret | | | 18 |
| 30 | (Sweden) Mikael Karlsson | | | | | | | | 11 | 9 | | | | | | | | | | | | 16 |
| 31 | (Brazil) Celso Neto | | | | | | | | | | | | | | | | | | | 9 | 11 | 16 |
| 32 | (Spain) Erik Zabala | | | 10 | 11 | DNS | | | | | | | | | | | | | | | | 14 |
| 33 | (Italy) Sandro Pelatti | | | 12 | 12 | 11 | | | | | | | | | | | | | | | | 14 |
| 34 | (Hong Kong) William Cheung | | | | | | | | | | | | | 14 | 13 | 13 | 13 | 17 | 13 | 17 | 21 | 14 |
| 35 | (Estonia) Ruben Volt | 15^{6} | 9 | | | | | | | | | | | | | | | | | | | 13 |
| 36 | (Hong Kong) Tony Chan | | | | | | | | | | | | | | | | 16 | 10 | 12 | Ret | 18 | 12 |
| 37 | (Argentina) Ramiro Zago | 12 | 10 | | | | | | | | | | | | | | | | | | | 12 |
| 38 | (France) Tom Pussier | | | | | | 10 | 13 | | | | | | | | | | | | | | 11 |
| 39 | (Denmark) René Povlsen | | | 11 | 14 | 13 | | | | | | | | | | | | | | | | 11 |
| 40 | (Chinese Taipei) Andy Liang | | | | | | | | | | | | | 15 | 15 | 14 | 18 | 15 | 11 | 18 | 23 | 11 |
| 41 | (Hong Kong) Sunny Wong | | | | | | | | | | | | | | | | | | | 10 | 19 | 8 |
| 42 | (France) Gilles Chauvin | | | | | | 12 | 12 | | | | | | | | | | | | | | 8 |
| 43 | (China) Jiucheng Wu | | | | | | | | | | 14 | 13 | 13 | | | | | | | | | 8 |
| 44 | (South Korea) Yul Lee | | | | | | | | | | 13 | 12 | Ret | | | | | | | | | 7 |
| 45 | (South Korea) Jeongmin An | | | | | | | | | | Ret | 11 | Ret | | | | | | | | | 6 |
| 46 | (China) Jiajun Li | | | | | | | | | | 16 | 15 | Ret | | | | 17 | 13 | 15 | 20 | 20 | 5 |
| 47 | (Norway) Stian Paulsen | | | | | | | | 12 | Ret | | | | | | | | | | | | 4 |
| 48 | (China) Yate Tu | | | | | | | | | | Ret | 14 | 14 | | | | | | | Ret | Ret | 4 |
| 49 | (China) Bofei Zhang | | | | | | | | | | | | | DNS | 14 | DNS | | | | | | 2 |
| 50 | (United Kingdom) Luke Sargeant | | | 16 | 23 | 15 | | | | | | | | | | | | | | | | 1 |
| 51 | (France) Samuel Chaligne | | | 15 | 18 | DNS | | | | | | | | | | | | | | | | 1 |
| 52 | (China) Fu Bin | | | | | | | | | | | | | | | | 15 | DNS | DNS | | | 1 |
| 53 | (Hong Kong) Frederick Lee | | | | | | | | | | | | | | | | | | | 16 | 17 | 0 |
| 54 | (China) Zheming Zhuang | | | | | | | | | | | | | 16 | Ret | Ret | | | | | | 0 |
| 55 | (Spain) Busián Fontán | | | 18 | 17 | Ret | | | | | | | | | | | | | | | | 0 |
| 56 | (France) Mathieu Casalonga | | | 17 | 21 | Ret | | | Ret | DNS | | | | | | | | | | | | 0 |
| 57 | (Turkey) Demir Eröge | | | 20 | 19 | 18 | | | | | | | | | | | | | | | | 0 |
| 58 | (China) Hongzhi Liu | | | | | | | | | | | | | | | | | | | 19 | DNS | 0 |
| 59 | (Argentina) Sebastián Quirno | | | 21 | 20 | DNS | | | | | | | | | | | | | | | | 0 |
| 60 | (Hong Kong) Li Guanghua | | | | | | | | | | | | | | | | | | | Ret | 22 | 0 |
| – | (China) Juran Sun | | | | | | | | | | | | | | | | | | | Ret | Ret | – |
| – | (China) Yunjie Zhou | | | | | | | | | | | | | | | | | | | Ret | Ret | – |
| – | (France) Julien Piguet | | | | | | | | | | | | | | | | | | | Ret | Ret | – |
| – | (Hong Kong) Siuming Man | | | | | | | | | | | | | | | | | | | Ret | Ret | – |
| – | (Portugal) Daniel Teixeira | | | | | | | | Ret | DNS | | | | | | | | | | | | – |
| – | (France) Victor Weyrich | | | | | | DNS | DNS | | | | | | | | | | | | | | – |
| – | (China) Shuyan Tang | | | | | | | | | | | | | WD | WD | WD | | | | | | – |
| – | (Indonesia) Benny Santoso | | | | | | | | | | | | | | | | | | | WD | WD | – |
| Pos. | Driver | MIS (Italy) | | VAL (Spain) | | | LEC (France) | | VIL (Portugal) | | INJ (South Korea) | | | CHE (China) | | | ZHJ (China) | | | GUI (Macau) | | Pts. |

| Colour | Result |
|---|---|
| Gold | Winner |
| Silver | Second place |
| Bronze | Third place |
| Green | Points classification |
| Blue | Non-points classification |
| Blue | Non-classified finish (NC) |
| Purple | Retired, not classified (Ret) |
| Red | Did not qualify (DNQ) |
| Red | Did not pre-qualify (DNPQ) |
| Black | Disqualified (DSQ) |
| White | Did not start (DNS) |
| White | Withdrew (WD) |
| White | Race cancelled (C) |
| Blank | Did not practice (DNP) |
| Blank | Did not arrive (DNA) |
| Blank | Excluded (EX) |

**Bold** – Pole
Italics – Fastest Lap

† – Drivers did not finish the race, but were classified as they completed over 75% of the race distance.

==== Team's Standings ====
| Pos. | Driver | MIS (Italy) | | VAL (Spain) | LEC (France) | VIL (Portugal) | INJ (South Korea) | CHE (China) | ZHJ (China) | GUI (Macau) | Pts. |
|---|---|---|---|---|---|---|---|---|---|---|---|
| 1 | (Italy) BRC Hyundai N Squadra Corse | 1^{1} | 2 | | | | | | | | 111 |
| 1 | (Italy) BRC Hyundai N Squadra Corse | 2^{2} | 11 | | | | | | | | 111 |
| 2 | (China) Geely Cyan Racing | 3^{3} | 3 | | | | | | | | 96 |
| 2 | (China) Geely Cyan Racing | 4^{4} | 5 (Note: Ma Qing Hua does not score points in the Teams' Championship.) | | | | | | | | 96 |
| 3 | (France) SP Compétition | 6 | 4 | | | | | | | | 48 |
| 3 | (France) SP Compétition | 9 | 14 | | | | | | | | 48 |
| 4 | (Spain) GOAT Racing | 7 | 7 | | | | | | | | 28 |
| 5 | (Estonia) ALM Motorsport | 13^{6} | 8 | | | | | | | | 28 |
| 5 | (Estonia) ALM Motorsport | 15 | 9 | | | | | | | | 28 |
| 6 | (Italy) MM Motorsport | 12 | 10 | | | | | | | | 12 |
| 7 | (France) JSB Compétition | 16 | 12 | | | | | | | | 7 |
| 7 | (France) JSB Compétition | 17 | 13 | | | | | | | | 7 |
| 8 | (Spain) Monlau Motorsport | 11 | Ret | | | | | | | | 6 |
| 9 | (Italy) Trico WRT | 14 | 15 | | | | | | | | 3 |
| Pos. | Driver | MIS (Italy) | | VAL (Spain) | LEC (France) | VIL (Portugal) | INJ (South Korea) | CHE (China) | ZHJ (China) | GUI (Macau) | Pts. |
