= Lucile Cypriano =

French racing driver

- Nationality: French
- Born: Lucile Christiane Martine Cypriano; 2 September 1996 (age 30) Châtenay-Malabry, Hauts-de-Seine

SEAT León Eurocup career
- Debut season: 2015
- Current team: JSB Compétition
- Car number: 9
- Starts: 8
- Poles: 1

Previous series
- 2015 2014 2013 2008-11: TCR International Series; Volkswagen Scirocco R-Cup; French F4 Championship; Karting

Lucile Christiane Martine Cypriano (born 2 September 1996) is a French racing driver who last competed in the SEAT León Eurocup. She previously competed in the TCR International Series, Volkswagen Scirocco R-Cup and French F4 Championship.

== Racing career ==
Cypriano began her career in 2003 in karting. After karting for ten years, she switched to the French F4 Championship in 2013, she ended 21st in the championship standings that year. In 2014, Cypriano switched to the Volkswagen Scirocco R-Cup, she ended the season 12th in standings. In 2015, Cypriano made her SEAT León Eurocup debut with JSB Compétition, she took her first pole position in the second round at Estoril. In April 2015, it was announced that Cypriano would make her TCR International Series debut with JSB Compétition driving a SEAT León Cup Racer. She also became the first female racer in the series.

== Racing record ==
=== Career summary ===
Season	Series	Team	Races	Wins	Poles	F/Laps	Podiums	Points	Position
2013	French F4 Championship	Auto Sport Academy	15	0	0	0	0	4	21st
2014	Volkswagen Scirocco R-Cup	N/A	10	0	0	0	0	154	12th
2015	SEAT León Eurocup	JSB Compétition	14	1	1	0	3	29	9th
2015	TCR International Series	JSB Compétition	2	0	0	0	0	0	NC
2016	SEAT León Eurocup	Lucile Cypriano	6	0	0	1	2	61	9th
2017	Porsche Carrera Cup France	Racing Technology	11	0	0	0	0	46	13th
2023	French GT4 Cup - Pro-Am	Matmut Évolution	12	0	0	0	6	135	**3rd**

=== Complete TCR International Series results ===
(key) (Races in bold indicate pole position) (Races in italics indicate fastest lap)

Year	Team	Car	1	2	3	4	5	6	7	8	9	10	11	12	13	14	15	16	17	18	19	20	21	22	DC	Points
2015	JSB Compétition	SEAT León Cup Racer	MYS; 1	MYS; 2	CHN; 1	CHN; 2	ESP; 1; 12	ESP; 2 Ret	POR; 1	POR; 2	ITA; 1	ITA; 2	AUT; 1	AUT; 2	RUS; 1	RUS; 2	RBR; 1	RBR; 2	SIN; 1	SIN; 2	THA; 1	THA; 2	MAC; 1	MAC; 2	NC	0
