= Julien Briché =

French racing driver (born 1981)

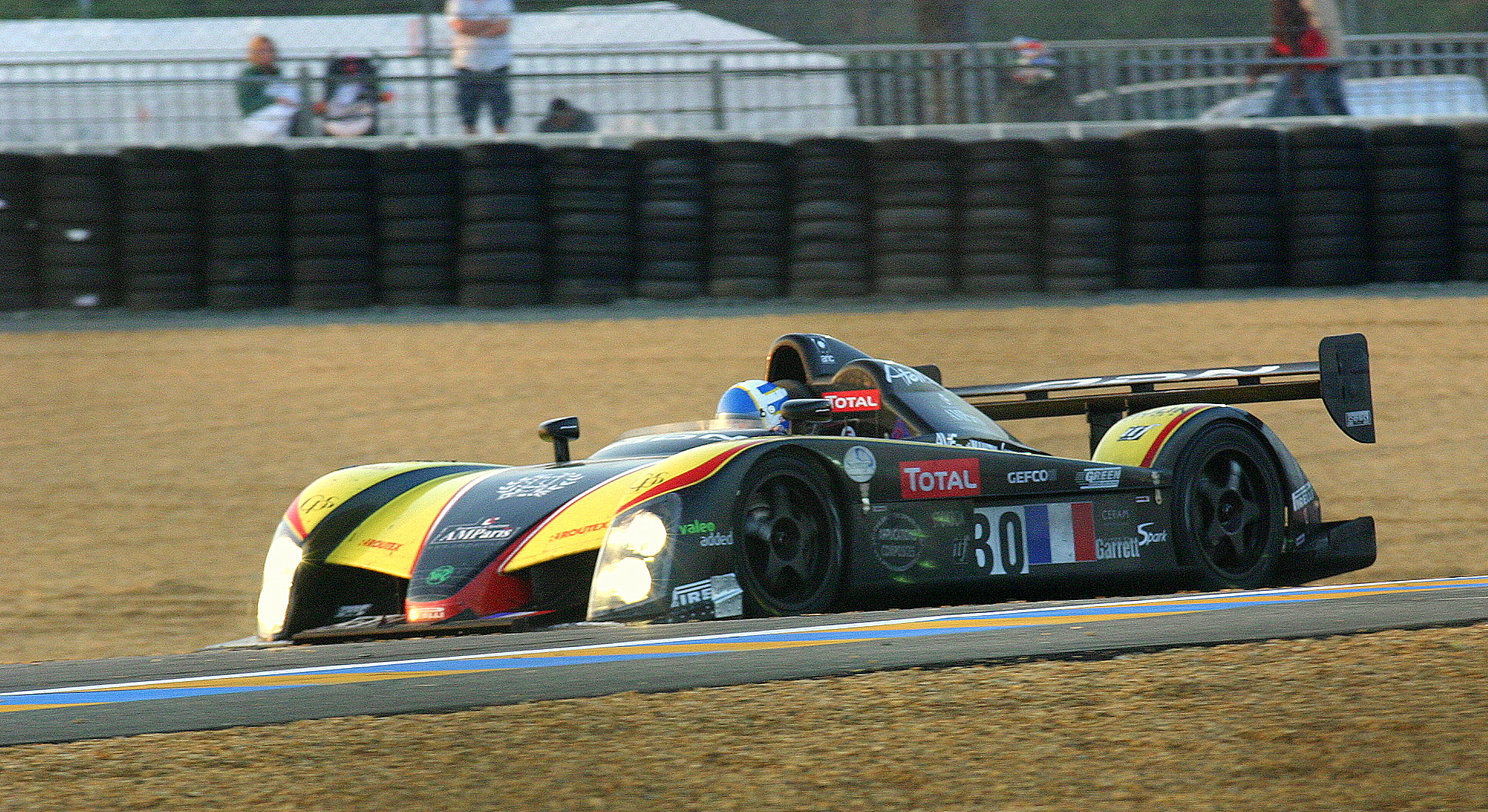
- Briché in 2006
- Nationality: (France) French
- Born: Julien Serge Briché; 12 February 1981 (age 45) Ferrières, France
- Relatives: Florian Briché (son)
- Categorisation: FIA Gold (until 2019); FIA Silver (2020–2025); FIA Bronze (2026–)

Championship titles
- 2019 2017, 2019 2010 2002, 2005: TCR BeNeLux Touring Car Championship; Peugeot 308 Racing Cup; SEAT Leon Supercopa France; Peugeot 206 RCC Cup France

Julien Serge Briché (born 12 February 1981) is a French racing driver who last competed in TCR Europe for JSB Compétition, a team he founded in 2007.

Best known for his touring car and GT4 success, Briché finished runner-up in the 2019 TCR Europe and is a multi-time Peugeot and SEAT one-make champion. He raced at the 24 Hours of Le Mans once in LMP2.

== Career ==
Briché made his car racing debut in 2001, competing in Peugeot 206 RCC Cup France, which he won the following year. After racing in the French Supertouring Championship the following year, Briché was runner-up in the Peugeot RC Cup in 2004, before securing his second Peugeot 206 RCC Cup title in 2005. In 2006, Briché made a surprise appearance at the 24 Hours of Le Mans for Gerard Welter's LMP2 outfit, as well as a one-off appearance in the Danish Touringcar Challenge.

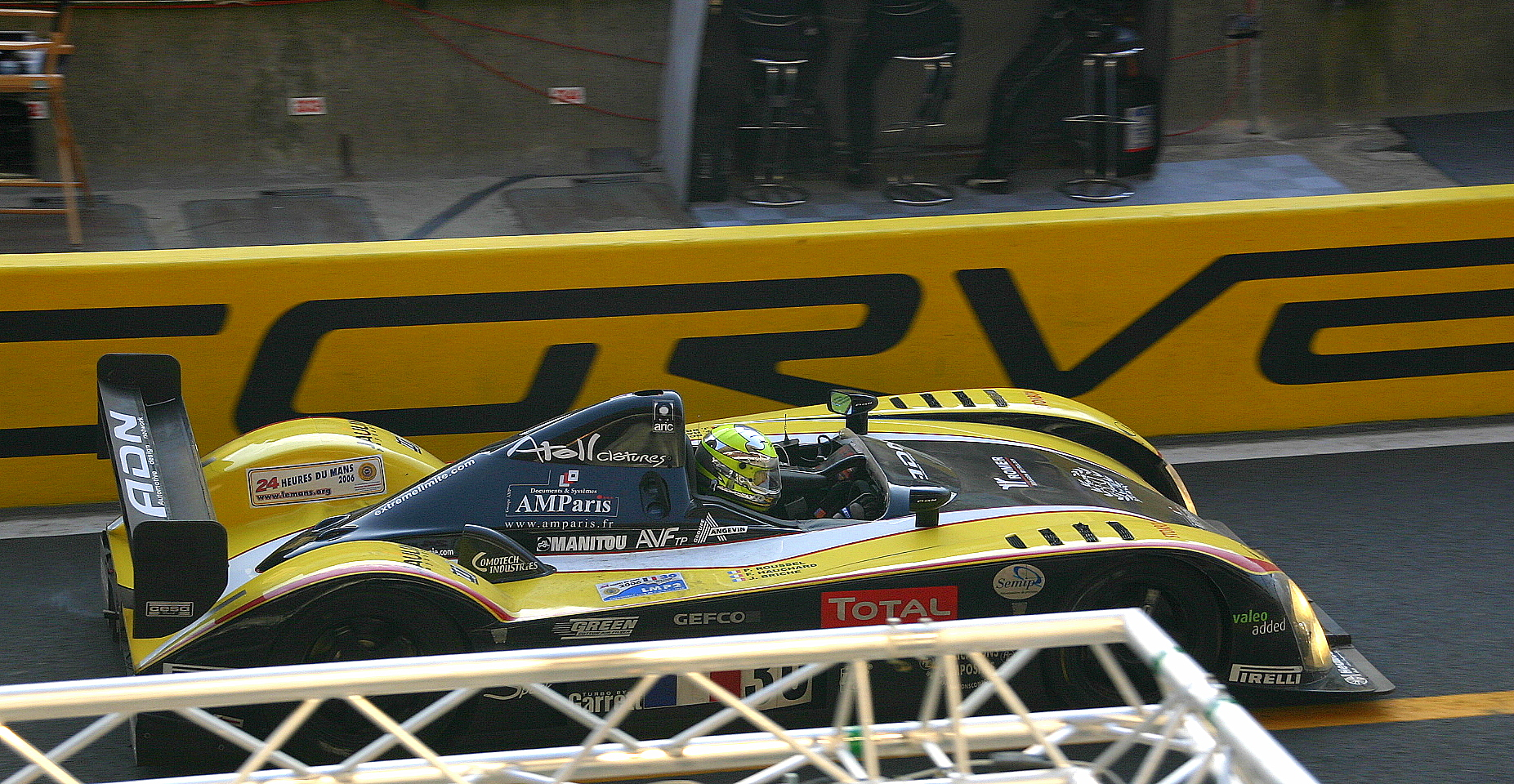
Briché driving his WR–Peugeot LMP2 down pit lane at the 2006 24 Hours of Le Mans.

The following year, Briché founded JSB Compétition and raced with them in the Peugeot THP Spider Cup, in which he finished runner-up in the overall standings with four wins to his name. Remaining in the series for the following year, Briché took six wins in the ten races he contested en route to a third-place points finish. In parallel, Briché competed in the GT3 class of the FFSA GT Championship for First Racing, taking five wins en route to fourth in points. Two full seasons in the series for his own team then followed, in which he most notably scored an outright win at Magny-Cours in 2010 to take 11th in the standings. During 2010, Briché also raced for the same team in SEAT Leon Supercopa France, in which he won five times as he clinched the series title.

Switching to Porsche Carrera Cup France for 2011, Briché scored a lone win at Le Castellet as he ended the year seventh in points. A tenth-place points finish with a win at Lédenon then followed the following year, which was also accompanied by a third-place points finish on his return to Peugeot RCZ Racing Cup France. Following a part-time season in both the FFSA GT Championship and the Peugeot 208 Racing Cup France in 2013, Briché returned to his team to race in the SEAT León Eurocup the following year. In his first season in the series, Briché took wins at Spa and Monza en route to a third-place points finish. Two more seasons in the series then followed, in which Briché posted points finishes of fourth and fifth, as well as scoring a lone win at the Red Bull Ring in 2016.

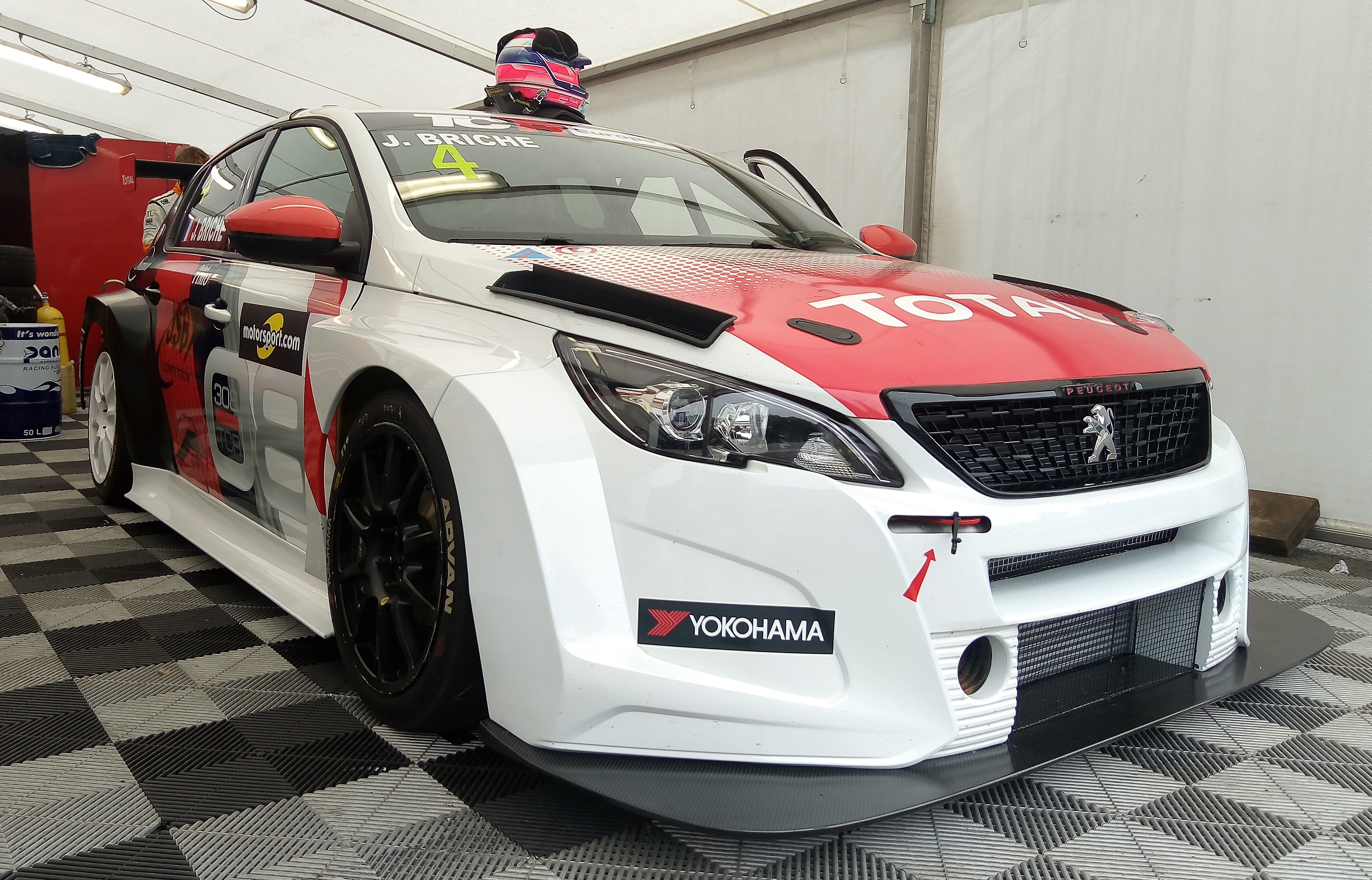
Briché's Peugeot 308 TCR, pictured in its awning at Spa-Francorchamps in 2018.

In 2017, Briché transitioned over to the Peugeot 308 Racing Cup, scoring seven wins and four other podiums to clinch the title at season's end. A second season in the series then ensued, in which Briché took five wins and four other podiums en route to runner-up honours. In parallel, Briché also raced in TCR Europe, taking his maiden win at Spa en route to an 11th-place points finish in the outright standings and third in the TCR BeNeLux subchampionship. Returning to TCR Europe for 2019, Briché began the season with wins at Hungaroring, Hockenheimring and Spa, before ending the year with a win at Monza to clinch runner-up honours and the TCR BeNeLux title over Josh Files. During 2019, Briché also clinched his second Peugeot 308 Racing Cup and finished second in the TCR Spa 500 for DG Sport Compétition. At the beginning of 2020, Briché was set to race in and was set to compete in the TCR Asia Pacific Cup and TCR Australia, but ultimately didn't race as the COVID-19 pandemic cancelled both seasons. Returning to TCR Europe for the rest of the year, Briché won in Monza and scored two other podiums to end the season 10th in points.

Returning to sportscars in 2021, Briché returned to the now-named French GT4 Cup with his own team, fielding an Aston Martin Vantage, before stepping up to the European series the following year, scoring a Pro-Am podium on home turf at Le Castellet to take 13th in points with an Alpine A110 and a Mercedes-AMG GT4. Another season in GT4 Europe then followed, as the team reverted to the Vantage, before switching to a Porsche Cayman for 2024, with which Briché took a Pro-Am win at Misano and three other podiums en route to fifth in points. In 2025, Briché and JSB returned to TCR Europe with a Hyundai Elantra N TCR, scoring a best result of fourth in race two at the Hockenheimring as he ended the year 18th in points. The following year, Briché continued with his own team for a dual campaign in TCR Europe and the Am class of the French GT4 Cup and the GT4 European Series. In TCR Europe, Briché took a best result of fifth at the Barcelona finale to take 19th in the overall standings. In GT4 Europe, Briché began the season with a pair of Am class wins at Le Castellet before transitioning to Pro-Am for the rest of the year, where he took three points finishes.

== Personal life ==
Briché's son Florian is also a racing driver, whom he raced with in TCR Europe and the GT4 European Series.

== Racing record ==
=== Racing career summary ===
Season	Series	Team	Races	Wins	Poles	F/Laps	Podiums	Points	Position
2001	Peugeot 206 RCC Cup France								
2002	Peugeot 206 RCC Cup France								**1st**
2003	Brazilian Prototype Championship – Division 4	Gémo Sport	12	0	0	0	4	104	6th
2004	Peugeot RC Cup							86	**2nd**
2005	Peugeot 206 RCC Cup France		14	6	8	6	11	117	**1st**
2005	Brazilian Prototype Championship – Division 4	Gémo Sport	2	0	0	0	1	0	19th
2006	24 Hours of Le Mans – LMP2	Gerard Welter	1	0	0	0	0	—N/a	DNF
2006	Danish Touringcar Championship	Peugeot Sport Danmark	2	0	0	0	0	0	NC
2007	Peugeot THP Spider Cup	JSB Compétition	14	4	1	1	9	176	**2nd**
2007	Renault Clio Cup France	Sport Garage	9	0	0	1	2	44	6th
2008	FFSA GT Championship – GT3	First Racing	13	5	0	0	6	184	4th
2008	Peugeot THP Spider Cup	JSB Compétition	10	6	1	1	7	174	**3rd**
2009	FFSA GT Championship – GT3	JSB Compétition	14	0	0	0	2	96	8th
2009	Peugeot THP Spider Cup	JSB Compétition	4	0	0	0	1	21	18th
2009	FIA GT3 European Championship	AutoGT Racing	2	0	0	0	0	1	30th
2009	International GT Open – Pro-Am	Jean Claude Lagniez	2	0	0	0	0	0	NC
2010	FFSA GT Championship	JSB Compétition	9	1	1	0	1	43	11th
2010	SEAT Leon Supercopa France	JSB Compétition	12	5	3	2	7	162	**1st**
2010	SEAT León Supercopa Spain	Julien Briché	3	0	0	0	0	8	23rd
2011	Porsche Carrera Cup France	JSB Compétition	10	1	0	2	4	72	7th
2011	FIA GT3 European Championship	Team Cine Cascade	2	0	0	0	0	0	58th
2012	Peugeot RCZ Racing Cup France	JSB Compétition	12	3	3	3	8	144	**3rd**
2012	Porsche Carrera Cup France	JSB Compétition	7	1	0	1	1	78	10th
2013	FFSA GT Championship	JMB Racing	4	0	0	0	0	6	25th
2013	Peugeot 208 Racing Cup France	Ropars Competition	2	0	0	0	0	16	18th
2014	SEAT León Eurocup	JSB Compétition	12	2	1	2	5	58	**3rd**
2014	Peugeot RCZ Racing Cup France	JSB Compétition	2	0	1	0	0	19	15th
2015	SEAT León Eurocup	JSB Compétition	14	0	1	3	3	45	4th
2016	SEAT León Eurocup	Julien Briché	12	1	1	3	6	151	5th
2016	Lamborghini Super Trofeo Europe – Pro-Am	MN Development	10	0	0	0	0	30	9th
2016	Lamborghini Super Trofeo World Finals – Pro-Am	MN Development	2	0	0	0	0	3	11th
2017	Peugeot 308 Racing Cup	JSB Compétition	12	7	7	10	11	208	**1st**
2017	Lamborghini Super Trofeo Europe – Pro-Am	MN Development	4	1	0	0	1	33	8th
2018	Peugeot 308 Racing Cup	JSB Compétition	12	5	5	4	9	181	**2nd**
2018	TCR Europe Touring Car Series	JSB Compétition	10	1	0	2	1	42	11th
2018	TCR BeNeLux Touring Car Championship	JSB Compétition	10	1	0	0	3	117	**3rd**
2018	TCR Ibérico Touring Car Series	JSB Compétition	2	0	0	0	0	6	18th
2018	TCR Swiss Trophy	JSB Compétition	4	0	0	0	0	0	NC
2019	TCR Europe Touring Car Series	JSB Compétition	14	4	1	2	7	314	**2nd**
2019	TCR BeNeLux Touring Car Championship	JSB Compétition	10	5	0	1	8	311	**1st**
2019	Peugeot 308 Racing Cup	JSB Compétition							**1st**
2019	TCR Ibérico Touring Car Series	JSB Compétition	2	0	0	1	2	33	7th
2019	TCR Spa 500	DG Sport Compétition	1	0	0	0	1	—N/a	**2nd**
2020	TCR Europe Touring Car Series	JSB Compétition	12	1	0	2	3	175	10th
2020	TCR Iberico	JSB Compétition	2	0	0	0	0	2	22nd
2021	French GT4 Cup – Pro-Am	JSB Compétition	10	0	0	0	0	22	18th
2022	GT4 European Series – Pro-Am	JSB Compétition	10	0	0	0	1	38	13th
2022	French GT4 Cup – Silver	JSB Compétition	2	0	0	0	0	1	15th
2023	GT4 European Series – Pro-Am	JSB Compétition	4	0	0	0	1	40	15th
2023	GT4 European Series – Silver	JSB Compétition	6	0	1	0	0	1	39th
2024	GT4 European Series – Pro-Am	JSB Compétition	10	1	1	1	3	89	5th
2024	TC France Series – TC	JSB Compétition	4	3	4	3	4	0	NC†
2025	TC France Series – TCR	JSB Compétition	2	0	0	0	0	6	7th
2025	TCR Europe Touring Car Series	JSB Compétition	10	0	0	1	0	51	18th
2025	TCR World Tour	JSB Compétition	3	0	0	0	0	4	37th
2026	TCR Europe Touring Car Series	JSB Compétition	6	0	0	0	0	30	19th
2026	French GT4 Cup – Am	JSB Compétition							
2026	GT4 European Series – Am	JSB Compétition	2	2	2	0	2	53	4th
2026	GT4 European Series – Pro-Am	JSB Compétition	10	0	0	0	0	18	14th
2026	TCR World Tour	JSB Compétition	7	0	0	0	0	39	16th*

^{†} As Briché was a guest driver, he was ineligible to score points.

=== 24 Hours of Le Mans results ===
Year	Team	Co-Drivers	Car	Class	Laps	Pos.	Class Pos.
2006	(France) Gerard Welter	(France) Patrice Roussel (France) Frédéric Hauchard	WR LMP04-Peugeot	LMP2	134	DNF	DNF

=== Complete FIA GT3 European Championship results ===
(key) (Races in bold indicate pole position; races in italics indicate fastest lap)

Year	Entrant	Chassis	Engine	1	2	3	4	5	6	7	8	9	10	11	12	Pos.	Points
2009	AutoGT Racing	Morgan Aero SuperSports GT3	BMW 5.0 L V8	SIL; 1	SIL; 2	ADR; 1	ADR; 2	OSC; 1	OSC; 2	ALG; 1	ALG; 2	LEC; 1	LEC; 2	ZOL; 1; 8	ZOL; 2; 11	30th	1
2011	Team Cine Cascade	Lamborghini Gallardo LP600+	Lamborghini 5.2 L V10	ALG; 1	ALG; 2	SIL; 1	SIL; 2	NAV; 1	NAV; 2	LEC; 1	LEC; 2	SLO; 1	SLO; 2	ZAN; 1; 22	ZAN; 2; 23	58th	0

=== Complete TCR Europe Touring Car Series results ===
(key) (Races in bold indicate pole position) (Races in italics indicate fastest lap)

Year	Team	Car	1	2	3	4	5	6	7	8	9	10	11	12	13	14	DC	Points
2018	JSB Compétition	Peugeot 308 TCR	LEC; 1	LEC; 2	ZAN; 1 Ret	ZAN; 2 Ret	SPA; 1; 5^{3}	SPA; 2; 1	HUN; 1; 16	HUN; 2; 15	ASS; 1; 14	ASS; 2; 11	MNZ; 1	MNZ; 2	CAT; 1; 8	CAT; 2; 22	11th	42
2019	JSB Compétition	Peugeot 308 TCR	HUN; 1 DSQ	HUN; 2; 1	HOC; 1; 4	HOC; 2; 1	SPA; 1 Ret	SPA; 2; 1	RBR; 1 Ret	RBR; 2; 12	OSC; 1; 11	OSC; 2; 14	CAT; 1; 2^{3}	CAT; 2; 3	**MNZ**; **1**; 1^{1}	MNZ; 2; 2	2nd	314
2020	JSB Compétition	Peugeot 308 TCR	LEC; 1; 14	LEC; 2; 14	ZOL; 1; 15†^{7}	ZOL; 2 Ret	MNZ; 1; 1^{4}	MNZ; 2; 2	CAT; 1; 9	CAT; 2; 21	SPA; 1; 11	SPA; 2; 17	JAR; 1; 5^{5}	JAR; 2; 3			10th	175
2025	JSB Compétition	Hyundai Elantra N TCR (2024)	PRT; 1; 8	PRT; 2; 19	SPA; 1; 11	SPA; 2 Ret	HOC; 1; 9	HOC; 2; 4	MIS; 1	MIS; 2	RBR; 1; 13	RBR; 2 Ret	CAT; 1; 16	CAT; 2 Ret			18th	51
2026	JSB Compétition	Hyundai Elantra N TCR (2024)	MUG; 1; 21	MUG; 2 Ret	SPA; 1 WD	SPA; 2 WD	LEC; 1	LEC; 2	HUN; 1	HUN; 2	MNZ; 1; 21	MNZ; 2; 18	CAT; 1; 8	CAT; 2; 5			19th	30

^{†} Briché did not finish, but was classified as he completed over 75% of the race distance.

=== Complete GT4 European Series results ===
(key) (Races in bold indicate pole position) (Races in italics indicate fastest lap)

Year	Team	Car	Class	1	2	3	4	5	6	7	8	9	10	11	12	Pos	Points
2022	JSB Compétition	Alpine A110 GT4	Pro-Am	IMO; 1; 19	IMO; 2; 19	LEC; 1; 9	LEC; 2; 25	MIS; 1 Ret	MIS; 2; 14							13th	38
2022	JSB Compétition	Mercedes-AMG GT4	Pro-Am							SPA; 1; 20	SPA; 2; 16	HOC; 1; 32	HOC; 2; 20	CAT; 1	CAT; 2	13th	38
2023	JSB Compétition	Aston Martin Vantage AMR GT4	Pro-Am	MNZ; 1; 22	MNZ; 2; 26	LEC; 1; 19	**LEC**; **2**; 33									15th	40
2023	JSB Compétition	Aston Martin Vantage AMR GT4	Silver					**SPA**; **1**; 14	SPA; 2; 34	MIS; 1; 35	MIS; 2; 19	HOC; 1; 17	HOC; 2; 31	CAT; 1	CAT; 2	39th	1
2024	JSB Compétition	Porsche 718 Cayman GT4 Clubsport	Pro-Am	LEC; 1; 33†	LEC; 2 DNS	**MIS**; **1**; 10	MIS; 2; 12	SPA; 1; 13	SPA; 2; 23	HOC; 1; 33	HOC; 2; 29	MNZ; 1; 39†	MNZ; 2 DNS	JED; 1; 18	JED; 2; 16	5th	89
2026	JSB Compétition	Porsche 718 Cayman GT4 Clubsport	Am	**LEC**; **1**; 11	**LEC**; **2**; 11											4th	53
2026	JSB Compétition	Porsche 718 Cayman GT4 Clubsport	Pro-Am			MNZ; 1; 34	MNZ; 2; 11	SPA; 1 Ret	SPA; 2; 34	MIS; 1 Ret	MIS; 2 Ret	ZAN; 1 Ret	ZAN; 2 Ret	ALG; 1; 26	ALG; 2; 32	14th	18

=== Complete TCR World Tour results ===
(key) (Races in bold indicate pole position) (Races in italics indicate fastest lap)

Year	Team	Car	1	2	3	4	5	6	7	8	9	10	11	12	13	14	15	16	17	18	19	20	21	DC	Points
2025	JSB Compétition	Hyundai Elantra N TCR (2024)	AHR; 1	AHR; 2	AHR; 3	CRT; 1; 12	CRT; 2 Ret	CRT; 3; 17	MNZ; 1 WD	MNZ; 2 WD	CVR; 1	CVR; 2	BEN; 1	BEN; 2	BEN; 3	INJ; 1	INJ; 2	INJ; 3	ZHZ; 1	ZHZ; 2	ZHZ; 3	MAC; 1	MAC; 2	37th	5
2026	JSB Compétition	Hyundai Elantra N TCR (2024)	MIS; 1; 17	MIS; 2; 13	CRT; 1; 7	CRT; 2 Ret	CRT; 3; 9	LEC; 1; 8	LEC; 2 Ret	CVR; 1	CVR; 2	INJ; 1	INJ; 2	INJ; 3	CHE; 1	CHE; 2	CHE; 3	ZHZ; 1	ZHZ; 2	ZHZ; 3	MAC; 1	MAC; 2		16th*	39*

^{*} Season still in progress.
