= David Cebrián =

Spanish racing driver

- Nationality: Spanish
- Born: David Cebrián Ariza; 27 April 1991 (age 35) Barcelona, Spain

Renault Sport Trophy career
- Debut season: 2015
- Current team: Monlau Competición
- Car number: 14
- Starts: 2
- Wins: 1

Previous series
- 2015 2015 2011-12 2011, 13 2010 2009-10: SEAT León Eurocup; TCR International Series; SEAT Leon Supercopa France; Renault Clio Cup Spain; SEAT León Eurocup; Peugeot 207 Cup Spain

Championship titles
- 2010: Peugeot 207 Cup Spain

David Cebrián Ariza (Note: In this Spanish name, the first or paternal surname is Cebrián and the second or maternal family name is Ariza.) (born 27 April 1991) is a Spanish racing driver currently competing in the Renault Sport Trophy. He previously competed in the TCR International Series and SEAT León Eurocup.

== Racing career ==
Cebrián began his career in 2009 in the Peugeot 207 Cup Spain, he won the championship in 2010. He switched to the SEAT León Eurocup in 2010. From 2011 to 2013, he raced in the SEAT Leon Supercopa France and Renault Clio Cup Spain championships. In April 2015, it was announced that Cebrián would make his TCR International Series debut with JSB Compétition driving a SEAT León Cup Racer.

== Racing record ==
=== Complete TCR International Series results ===
(key) (Races in bold indicate pole position) (Races in italics indicate fastest lap)

Year	Team	Car	1	2	3	4	5	6	7	8	9	10	11	12	13	14	15	16	17	18	19	20	21	22	DC	Points
2015	JSB Compétition	SEAT León Cup Racer	MYS; 1	MYS; 2	CHN; 1	CHN; 2	ESP; 1; 14†	ESP; 2; 6	POR; 1	POR; 2	ITA; 1	ITA; 2	AUT; 1	AUT; 2	RUS; 1	RUS; 2	RBR; 1	RBR; 2	SIN; 1	SIN; 2	THA; 1	THA; 2	MAC; 1	MAC; 2	27th	8

^{†} Driver did not finish the race, but was classified as he completed over 90% of the race distance.
