= 2012 FIA WTCC Race of Hungary =

2012 Race of Hungary
Race details
- Round 5 of 12 in the 2012 World Touring Car Championship at Hungaroring in Mogyoród, Hungary.
- Date: 6 May, 2012
- Location: Mogyoród, Hungary
- Course: Hungaroring; 4.381 kilometres (2.722 mi)

Race One
- Laps: 12
Pole position
Driver		(France) Yvan Muller	Chevrolet
Time		1:54.503	
Podium
First		(France) Yvan Muller	Chevrolet
Second		(United Kingdom) Rob Huff	Chevrolet
Third		(Switzerland) Alain Menu	Chevrolet
Fastest Lap
Driver		(France) Yvan Muller	Chevrolet
Time		1:55.937	

Race Two
- Laps: 12
Podium
First		(Hungary) Norbert Michelisz	Zengő Motorsport
Second		(Switzerland) Alain Menu	Chevrolet
Third		(Morocco) Mehdi Bennani	Proteam Racing
Fastest Lap
Driver		(Hungary) Norbert Michelisz	Zengő Motorsport
Time		1:56.714	

The 2012 FIA WTCC Race of Hungary was the fifth round of the 2012 World Touring Car Championship season and the second running of the FIA WTCC Race of Hungary. It was held on 6 May 2012 at the Hungaroring in Mogyoród near Budapest, Hungary. The first race was won by Yvan Muller for Chevrolet and the second race was won by Norbert Michelisz for Zengő Motorsport.

== Background ==
Yvan Muller arrived in Hungary leading the championship from both of his Chevrolet team mates, 27 points ahead of Rob Huff with Alain Menu a further point behind. Pepe Oriola was leading the Yokohama Independents' Trophy.

Isaac Tutumlu left Proteam Racing after the Race of Slovakia, reducing the team to one car for Mehdi Bennani. James Thompson also rejoined the series, driving a Lada Granta WTCC for TMS Sport in the first of two outings in 2012.

== Report ==
=== Free Practice ===
Yvan Muller set the pace in the first free practice session ahead of Lukoil Racing Team's Gabriele Tarquini and Chevrolet's Alain Menu. Local driver Norbert Michelisz was the quickest independent driver. Three drives were warned for exceeding track limits, with Mehdi Bennani also being issued with a black and white flag warning.

Tarquini went fastest in free practice two, heading the Chevrolets of Muller and Huff and the SEAT of Darryl O'Young. Thompson ended the session ninth in the Lada Granta. Once again, drivers were warned for exceeding track limits, with Tarquini losing one of his times as a consequence.

=== Qualifying ===
The Chevrolets started 1–2–3 in the first race with Muller on pole position for the second time in 2012. Franz Engstler started on pole position for the reversed grid second race. Menu lost time behind Engstler in Q2 and started third for the first race. The ROAL Motorsport drivers were sent to the back of the grid for a parc fermé infringement, Alberto Cerqui had qualified 13th and Tom Coronel had qualified 19th before the penalty.

=== Warm-Up ===
Tarquini led the morning warm-up session ahead of the Chevrolet trio of Huff, Menu and Muller.

=== Race One ===
Muller led away from the rolling start but an incident behind caused Michelisz to run wide and the chain reaction as several cars recovered forced Tarquini and Tom Boardman into retirement. Bennani had got up to second by the first corner before dropping down to fourth by the second corner, after which the Chevrolets led 1–2–3. Michelisz had recovered to sixth place but was overtaken by Coronel on the final lap, the ROAL driver having climbed from 21st on the grid. Muller took the win ahead of Huff, Menu and Bennani who took his best ever WTCC result and the Yokohama Independents' Trophy win.

=== Race Two ===
Engstler started from pole position for the reversed grid race, however a fast start from Michelisz in fifth ensured he led into the first corner. The order behind Michelisz was Oriola ahead of Bennani until Menu came charging through the field from eighth on the grid to take second. Huff finished seventh and Muller finished tenth after a last lap off put him behind Stefano D'Aste and Engstler. Michelisz took the overall win and the Independents' win in front of his home fans.

== Results ==
=== Qualifying ===
Pos.	No.	Name	Team	Car	C	Q1	Q2	Points
1	1	(France) Yvan Muller	Chevrolet	Chevrolet Cruze 1.6T		1:55.077	1:54.503	**5**
2	2	(United Kingdom) Robert Huff	Chevrolet	Chevrolet Cruze 1.6T		1:55.201	1:54.770	**4**
3	8	(Switzerland) Alain Menu	Chevrolet	Chevrolet Cruze 1.6T		1:55.405	1:54.993	**3**
4	3	(Italy) Gabriele Tarquini	Lukoil Racing	SEAT León WTCC		1:55.357	1:55.074	**2**
5	25	(Morocco) Mehdi Bennani	Proteam Racing	BMW 320 TC	Y	1:56.245	1:55.205	**1**
6	5	(Hungary) Norbert Michelisz	Zengő Motorsport	BMW 320 TC	Y	1:55.779	1:55.322	
7	18	(Portugal) Tiago Monteiro	Tuenti Racing	SR León 1.6T		1:55.757	1:55.362	
8	20	(China) Darryl O'Young	Special Tuning Racing	SEAT León WTCC	Y	1:55.794	1:55.768	
9	74	(Spain) Pepe Oriola	Tuenti Racing	SEAT León WTCC	Y	1:56.085	1:55.841	
10	6	(Germany) **Franz Engstler**	Liqui Moly Team Engstler	BMW 320 TC	Y	1:56.081	1:55.953	
11	11	(United Kingdom) Alex MacDowall	bamboo-engineering	Chevrolet Cruze 1.6T	Y	1:56.342	1:56.096	
12	14	(United Kingdom) James Nash	Team Aon	Ford Focus S2000 TC		1:56.343	1:56.791	
13	7	(Hong Kong) Charles Ng	Liqui Moly Team Engstler	BMW 320 TC	Y	1:56.387		
14	26	(Italy) Stefano D'Aste	Wiechers-Sport	BMW 320 TC	Y	1:56.434		
15	69	(United Kingdom) James Thompson	TMS Sport	Lada Granta WTCC		1:56.527		
16	27	(Hungary) Gábor Wéber	Zengő Motorsport	BMW 320 TC	Y	1:56.542		
17	4	(Russia) Aleksei Dudukalo	Lukoil Racing	SEAT León WTCC	Y	1:56.544		
18	12	(Italy) Pasquale Di Sabatino	bamboo-engineering	Chevrolet Cruze 1.6T	Y	1:56.702		
19	23	(United Kingdom) Tom Chilton	Team Aon	Ford Focus S2000 TC		1:57.415		
20	22	(United Kingdom) Tom Boardman	Special Tuning Racing	SEAT León TDi	Y	1:57.890		
EX^{1}	16	(Italy) Alberto Cerqui	ROAL Motorsport	BMW 320 TC	Y	Excluded		
EX^{1}	15	(Netherlands) Tom Coronel	ROAL Motorsport	BMW 320 TC		Excluded		

- **Bold** denotes Pole position for second race.

^1 — The ROAL Motorsport drivers had their times from qualifying removed after the team broke a parc fermé regulation.

=== Race 1 ===
Pos.	No.	Name	Team	Car	C	Laps	Time/Retired	Grid	Points
1	1	(France) **Yvan Muller**	Chevrolet	Chevrolet Cruze 1.6T		12	23:23.462	1	25
2	2	(United Kingdom) Robert Huff	Chevrolet	Chevrolet Cruze 1.6T		12	+1.259	2	18
3	8	(Switzerland) Alain Menu	Chevrolet	Chevrolet Cruze 1.6T		12	+1.759	3	15
4	25	(Morocco) Mehdi Bennani	Proteam Racing	BMW 320 TC	Y	12	+10.983	5	12
5	18	(Portugal) Tiago Monteiro	Tuenti Racing	SR León 1.6T		12	+15.206	7	10
6	15	(Netherlands) Tom Coronel	ROAL Motorsport	BMW 320 TC		12	+15.786	21	8
7	5	(Hungary) Norbert Michelisz	Zengő Motorsport	BMW 320 TC	Y	12	+16.480	6	6
8	74	(Spain) Pepe Oriola	Tuenti Racing	SEAT León WTCC	Y	12	+16.971	9	4
9	11	(United Kingdom) Alex MacDowall	bamboo-engineering	Chevrolet Cruze 1.6T	Y	12	+18.106	11	2
10	27	(Hungary) Gábor Wéber	Zengő Motorsport	BMW 320 TC	Y	12	+20.950	12	1
11	14	(United Kingdom) James Nash	Team Aon	Ford Focus S2000 TC		12	+24.446	12	
12	12	(Italy) Pasquale Di Sabatino	bamboo-engineering	Chevrolet Cruze 1.6T	Y	12	+26.296	18	
13	16	(Italy) Alberto Cerqui	ROAL Motorsport	BMW 320 TC	Y	12	+26.493	20	
14	4	(Russia) Aleksei Dudukalo	Lukoil Racing	SEAT León WTCC	Y	12	+30.396	17	
15	23	(United Kingdom) Tom Chilton	Team Aon	Ford Focus S2000 TC		12	+31.116	19	
16	7	(Hong Kong) Charles Ng	Liqui Moly Team Engstler	BMW 320 TC	Y	12	+31.897	13	
17	26	(Italy) Stefano D'Aste	Wiechers-Sport	BMW 320 TC	Y	9	+3 Laps	14	
Ret	69	(United Kingdom) James Thompson	TMS Sport	Lada Granta WTCC		7	Overheating	15	
NC	6	(Germany) Franz Engstler	Liqui Moly Team Engstler	BMW 320 TC	Y	4	+8 Laps	10	
NC	20	(China) Darryl O'Young	Special Tuning Racing	SEAT León WTCC	Y	3	+9 Laps	8	
Ret	3	(Italy) Gabriele Tarquini	Lukoil Racing	SEAT León WTCC		1	Collision	4	
Ret	22	(United Kingdom) Tom Boardman	Special Tuning Racing	SEAT León TDi	Y	0	Collision	20	

- **Bold** denotes Fastest lap.

=== Race 2 ===
Pos.	No.	Name	Team	Car	C	Laps	Time/Retired	Grid	Points
1	5	(Hungary) **Norbert Michelisz**	Zengő Motorsport	BMW 320 TC	Y	12	23:37.603	5	25
2	8	(Switzerland) Alain Menu	Chevrolet	Chevrolet Cruze 1.6T		12	+1.805	8	18
3	25	(Morocco) Mehdi Bennani	Proteam Racing	BMW 320 TC	Y	12	+4.998	6	15
4	74	(Spain) Pepe Oriola	Tuenti Racing	SEAT León WTCC	Y	12	+6.221	2	12
5	18	(Portugal) Tiago Monteiro	Tuenti Racing	SR León 1.6T		12	+8.020	4	10
6	3	(Italy) Gabriele Tarquini	Lukoil Racing	SEAT León WTCC		12	+8.641	7	8
7	2	(United Kingdom) Robert Huff	Chevrolet	Chevrolet Cruze 1.6T		12	+9.077	9	6
8	26	(Italy) Stefano D'Aste	Wiechers-Sport	BMW 320 TC	Y	12	+10.139	14	4
9	6	(Germany) Franz Engstler	Liqui Moly Team Engstler	BMW 320 TC	Y	12	+11.067	1	2
10	1	(France) Yvan Muller	Chevrolet	Chevrolet Cruze 1.6T		12	+11.572	10	1
11	11	(United Kingdom) Alex MacDowall	bamboo-engineering	Chevrolet Cruze 1.6T	Y	12	+13.174	11	
12	15	(Netherlands) Tom Coronel	ROAL Motorsport	BMW 320 TC		12	+15.438	20	
13	20	(Hong Kong) Darryl O'Young	Special Tuning Racing	SEAT León WTCC	Y	12	+19.695	3	
14	23	(United Kingdom) Tom Chilton	Team Aon	Ford Focus S2000 TC		13	+23.167	14	
15	12	(Italy) Pasquale Di Sabatino	bamboo-engineering	Chevrolet Cruze 1.6T	Y	12	+23.189	17	
16	4	(Russia) Aleksei Dudukalo	Lukoil Racing	SEAT León WTCC	Y	12	+23.189	16	
17	27	(Hungary) Gábor Wéber	Zengő Motorsport	BMW 320 TC	Y	12	+45.913	15	
18	16	(Italy) Alberto Cerqui	ROAL Motorsport	BMW 320 TC	Y	12	+1:50.928	19	
19	14	(United Kingdom) James Nash	Team Aon	Ford Focus S2000 TC		10	+2 Laps	12	
Ret	69	(United Kingdom) James Thompson	TMS Sport	Lada Granta WTCC		1	Collision	21	
Ret	7	(Hong Kong) Charles Ng	Liqui Moly Team Engstler	BMW 320 TC	Y	1	Collision	13	
DNS	22	(United Kingdom) Tom Boardman	Special Tuning Racing	SEAT León TDi	Y	0	Collision damage	22	

- **Bold** denotes Fastest lap.

== Standings after the round ==
Drivers' Championship standings

	Pos	Driver	Points
	1	(France) Yvan Muller	180
1	2	(Switzerland) Alain Menu	157
1	3	(United Kingdom) Robert Huff	150
1	4	(Italy) Gabriele Tarquini	97
1	5	(Netherlands) Tom Coronel	97

Yokohama Independents' Trophy standings

	Pos	Driver	Points
	1	(Spain) Pepe Oriola	74
1	2	(Hungary) Norbert Michelisz	67
1	3	(Italy) Stefano D'Aste	58
	4	(Germany) Franz Engstler	42
3	5	(Morocco) Mehdi Bennani	36

Manufacturers' Championship standings

	Pos	Manufacturer	Points
	1	(United States) Chevrolet	415
1	2	(Germany) BMW Customer Racing Teams	276
1	3	(Spain) SEAT Racing Technology	264

- Note: Only the top five positions are included for both sets of drivers' standings.
