= Pol Rosell =

Spanish racing driver (born 1991)

- Nationality: Spanish
- Full name: Pol Rosell Costa
- Born: 17 August 1991 (age 35) Vic, Spain

SEAT León Eurocup career
- Debut season: 2010
- Current team: Baporo Motorsport
- Car number: 1
- Starts: 26
- Wins: 5
- Poles: 2
- Fastest laps: 4
- Best finish: 1st in 2014, 2015

Previous series
- 2015 2014 2013 2011, 13 2011-13 2010 2008-10 2008 2008 2008 2007: TCR International Series; NASCAR Whelen Euro Series; Winter Series by GT Sport; Spanish GT Championship; International GT Open; SEAT Leon Eurocup; SEAT Leon Supercopa Spain; Formula Renault 2.0 WEC; Portugal Winter Series FR2.0; Fórmula Júnior FR2.0 Portugal; Karting

Championship titles
- 2014-2015 2011: SEAT León Eurocup; Spanish GT - GT Light

Pol Rosell Costa (born 17 August 1991) is a Spanish racing driver currently competing in the SEAT León Eurocup. He previously competed in the TCR International Series.

== Racing career ==
Rosell began his career in 2007 in karting. In 2008, he switched to the Fórmula Júnior FR2.0 Portugal, he finished third in the championship standings that year. That year, he also took part in the Portugal Winter Series FR2.0 and Formula Renault 2.0 WEC. He raced in the SEAT Leon Supercopa Spain championship from 2008 to 2010, finishing fourth in the championship standings in 2010. From 2011 to 2013, Rosell raced in the International GT Open, Spanish GT Championship and Winter Series by GT Sport, he finished fourth in the championship standings in the International GT Open and Spanish GT Championship in 2013. In July 2015, it was announced that Rosell would make his TCR International Series debut with Liqui Moly Team Engstler driving a Volkswagen Golf TCR.

== Racing record ==
=== Complete TCR International Series results ===
(key) (Races in bold indicate pole position) (Races in italics indicate fastest lap)

Year	Team	Car	1	2	3	4	5	6	7	8	9	10	11	12	13	14	15	16	17	18	19	20	21	22	DC	Points
2015	Liqui Moly Team Engstler	Volkswagen Golf TCR	MYS; 1	MYS; 2	CHN; 1	CHN; 2	ESP; 1	ESP; 2	POR; 1	POR; 2	ITA; 1	ITA; 2	AUT; 1	AUT; 2	RUS; 1	RUS; 2	RBR; 1; 9	**RBR**; **2**; 1	SIN; 1	SIN; 2	THA; 1	THA; 2	MAC; 1	MAC; 2	15th	27

Sporting positions
Preceded by Gábor Wéber (2010)	SEAT León Eurocup; Champion; 2014-2015	Succeeded by Niels Langeveld
