= Baporo Motorsport =

Spanish auto racing team

(Spain) Baporo Motorsport
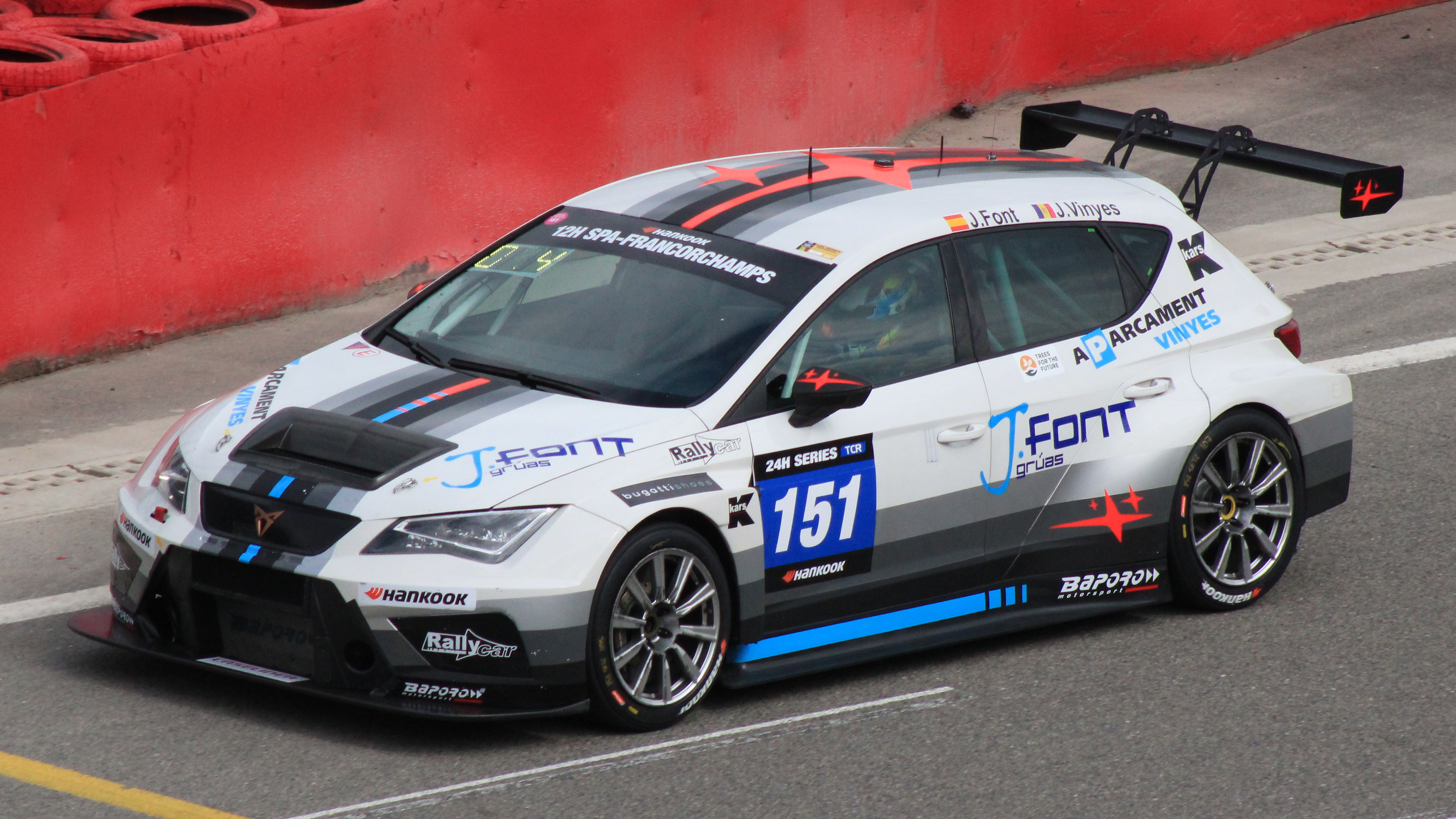
- Team principal(s): Abel Algué Casas
- Current series: TCR International Series; SEAT León Eurocup; European Touring Car Cup
- Noted drivers: TCR; 26. (Portugal) Francisco Mora; 50. (Netherlands) Loris Hezemans; ETC Cup; 73. (Kazakhstan) Alexandr Artemyev
- Drivers' Championships: 2014 SEAT León Eurocup (Rosell); 2015 SEAT León Eurocup (Rosell)
- Website: http://www.baporo-motorsport.com

Baporo Motorsport is a Spanish auto racing team based in Barcelona, Spain. The team currently races in the TCR International Series, SEAT León Eurocup & European Touring Car Cup.

== TCR International Series ==
=== SEAT León Cup Racer (2016–) ===
The team will make its début in the 2016 TCR International Series fielding 2 cars (1 SEAT León Cup Racer and one SEAT León TCR) for Francisco Mora (León Cup Racer) and Loris Hezemans (León TCR).

== European Touring Car Cup ==
=== SEAT León Supercopa (2013) ===
During the 2013 European Touring Car Cup the team entered a single SEAT León Supercopa for Nicolas Hamilton in the Single-makes Trophy. Hamilton competed in only 6 races, finishing 10th with 12 points.

=== SEAT León Cup Racer (2015–) ===
Following an hiatus the team return for 2015 running a single SEAT León Cup Racer for Kazakh driver Alexandr Artemyev. Artemyev competed only in Hungaroring finishing 7th and 11th.

Artemyev and Baporo Motorsport joined forces again in the following season with the team again fielding a single León Cup Racer for the Kazakh driver.
