= 2012 FIA WTCC Race of Portugal =

2012 Race of Portugal
Race details
- Round 7 of 12 in the 2012 World Touring Car Championship at Autódromo Internacional do Algarve in Portimão, Portugal.
- Date: 3 June, 2012
- Location: Portimão, Portugal
- Course: Autódromo Internacional do Algarve; 4.654 kilometres (2.892 mi)

Race One
- Laps: 11
Pole position
Driver		(Italy) Gabriele Tarquini	Lukoil Racing Team
Time		1:53.966	
Podium
First		(France) Yvan Muller	Chevrolet
Second		(Italy) Gabriele Tarquini	Lukoil Racing Team
Third		(United Kingdom) Rob Huff	Chevrolet
Fastest Lap
Driver		(France) Yvan Muller	Chevrolet
Time		1:54.541	

Race Two
- Laps: 11
Podium
First		(Switzerland) Alain Menu	Chevrolet
Second		(Spain) Pepe Oriola	Tuenti Racing Team
Third		(Netherlands) Tom Coronel	ROAL Motorsport
Fastest Lap
Driver		(Switzerland) Alain Menu	Chevrolet
Time		1:56.018	

The 2012 FIA WTCC Race of Portugal was the seventh round of the 2012 World Touring Car Championship season and the sixth running of the FIA WTCC Race of Portugal. It was held on 3 June 2012 at the Autódromo Internacional do Algarve in Portimão, Portugal. The first race was won by Yvan Muller for Chevrolet and the second race was won by Alain Menu, also for Chevrolet.

== Background ==
Coming into the event, Yvan Muller was the championship leader on 206 points ahead of Robert Huff on 198 and Menu on 175 points. Pepe Oriola was leading the Yokohama Independents' Trophy.

James Thompson and TMS Sport made their last scheduled appearance of the season with the Lada Granta WTCC. Tom Boardman switched to the new SEAT turbocharged engine, having run the TDi engine since Spain.

For the Race of Portugal weekend, Menu would be playing the role of comic book character Michel Vaillant. His Chevrolet Cruze raced in special Vaillante colours and Menu himself wore a special race suit and dyed his hair to look like the French comic book racer.

== Report ==
=== Free Practice ===
Lukoil Racing Team's Gabriele Tarquini set the pace in the first free practice session, nearly half a second ahead of the Chevrolet of Yvan Muller. Thompson put the TMS Sport Lada in 10th.

It was a Chevrolet 1-2-3 in the second practice session, with Yvan Muller topping the timing pages ahead of Menu and Huff.

=== Qualifying ===
Tarquini took his second pole position of the season with Yvan Muller second for Chevrolet and Norbert Michelisz third for Zengő Motorsport. The race two reversed grid would see Tuenti Racing Team's Pepe Oriola starting on position with Menu starting second. The session was stopped early on when Tom Chilton suffered a suspension failure, he and his team mate James Nash would form an all Ford back row.

=== Warm-Up ===
Muller went fastest in Sunday morning's warm-up session ahead of Chevrolet team mates of Huff and Menu.

=== Race One ===
Muller overtook Tarquini on the outside into turn one to take the lead, while further down the field, Aleksei Dudukalo and Gábor Wéber made contact and ended up in the gravel. Both drivers were able to get back on track and return to the pits. Muller held on to take the win ahead of Tarquini and Huff, with Michelisz the winning independent after coming home in fourth. Menu had climbed up to fifth position while the only remaining non-SEAT engined León of Tiago Monteiro spent much of the race defending his seventh place.

=== Race Two ===
A near repeat of race one saw the Chevrolet of Menu overtake pole sitter Oriola before the first corner. Further back, Mehdi Bennani made contact with Stefano D'Aste which earned him a suspended grid penalty. Tarquini had been defending from the Chevrolets of Muller and Huff when he took too much kerb, allowing Muller through. Huff and Tarquini made contact, spinning the Italian out of the race while Muller spun at his own accord. ROAL Motorsport's Alberto Cerqui took advantage of Muller's off to take fifth, a position that was later switched on the main straight. Menu took the victory ahead of podium debutant Oriola with Tom Coronel third.

== Results ==
=== Qualifying ===
Pos.	No.	Name	Team	Car	C	Q1	Q2	Points
1	3	(Italy) Gabriele Tarquini	Lukoil Racing	SEAT León WTCC		1:54.809	1:53.966	**5**
2	1	(France) Yvan Muller	Chevrolet	Chevrolet Cruze 1.6T		1:54.982	1:54.232	**4**
3	5	(Hungary) Norbert Michelisz	Zengő Motorsport	BMW 320 TC	Y	1:55.242	1:54.598	**3**
4	2	(United Kingdom) Robert Huff	Chevrolet	Chevrolet Cruze 1.6T		1:54.985	1:54.932	**2**
5	15	(Netherlands) Tom Coronel	ROAL Motorsport	BMW 320 TC		1:55.430	1:54.982	**1**
6	16	(Italy) Alberto Cerqui	ROAL Motorsport	BMW 320 TC	Y	1:55.413	1:55.036	
7	27	(Hungary) Gábor Wéber	Zengő Motorsport	BMW 320 TC	Y	1:55.740	1:55.087	
8	18	(Portugal) Tiago Monteiro	Tuenti Racing	SR León 1.6T		1:55.471	1:55.088	
9	8	(Switzerland) Alain Menu	Chevrolet	Chevrolet Cruze 1.6T		1:55.163	1:55.114	
10	74	(Spain) **Pepe Oriola**	Tuenti Racing	SEAT León WTCC	Y	1:55.380	1:55.323	
11	25	(Morocco) Mehdi Bennani	Proteam Racing	BMW 320 TC	Y	1:55.607	1:55.488	
12	4	(Russia) Aleksei Dudukalo	Lukoil Racing	SEAT León WTCC	Y	1:55.703	1:55.618	
13	6	(Germany) Franz Engstler	Liqui Moly Team Engstler	BMW 320 TC	Y	1:55.811		
14	20	(China) Darryl O'Young	Special Tuning Racing	SEAT León WTCC	Y	1:55.842		
15	11	(United Kingdom) Alex MacDowall	bamboo-engineering	Chevrolet Cruze 1.6T	Y	1:55.891		
16	26	(Italy) Stefano D'Aste	Wiechers-Sport	BMW 320 TC	Y	1:55.892		
17	69	(United Kingdom) James Thompson	TMS Sport	Lada Granta WTCC		1:55.926		
18	7	(Hong Kong) Charles Ng	Liqui Moly Team Engstler	BMW 320 TC	Y	1:56.080		
19	22	(United Kingdom) Tom Boardman	Special Tuning Racing	SEAT León WTCC	Y	1:56.260		
20	12	(Italy) Pasquale Di Sabatino	bamboo-engineering	Chevrolet Cruze 1.6T	Y	1:56.499		
21	14	(United Kingdom) James Nash	Team Aon	Ford Focus S2000 TC		1:56.554		
22	23	(United Kingdom) Tom Chilton	Team Aon	Ford Focus S2000 TC		1:57.117		

- **Bold** denotes Pole position for second race.

=== Race 1 ===
Pos.	No.	Name	Team	Car	C	Laps	Time/Retired	Grid	Points
1	1	(France) **Yvan Muller**	Chevrolet	Chevrolet Cruze 1.6T		11	21:20.620	2	25
2	3	(Italy) Gabriele Tarquini	Lukoil Racing	SEAT León WTCC		11	+0.336	1	18
3	2	(United Kingdom) Robert Huff	Chevrolet	Chevrolet Cruze 1.6T		11	+0.951	4	15
4	5	(Hungary) Norbert Michelisz	Zengő Motorsport	BMW 320 TC	Y	11	+6.699	3	12
5	8	(Switzerland) Alain Menu	Chevrolet	Chevrolet Cruze 1.6T		11	+13.669	9	10
6	15	(Netherlands) Tom Coronel	ROAL Motorsport	BMW 320 TC		11	+17.053	5	8
7	18	(Portugal) Tiago Monteiro	Tuenti Racing	SR León 1.6T		11	+20.172	8	6
8	16	(Italy) Alberto Cerqui	ROAL Motorsport	BMW 320 TC	Y	11	+20.422	6	4
9	74	(Spain) Pepe Oriola	Tuenti Racing	SEAT León WTCC	Y	11	+21.134	10	2
10	11	(United Kingdom) Alex MacDowall	bamboo-engineering	Chevrolet Cruze 1.6T	Y	11	+21.723	15	1
11	26	(Italy) Stefano D'Aste	Wiechers-Sport	BMW 320 TC	Y	11	+22.453	16	
12	6	(Germany) Franz Engstler	Liqui Moly Team Engstler	BMW 320 TC	Y	11	+26.142	13	
13	20	(China) Darryl O'Young	Special Tuning Racing	SEAT León WTCC	Y	11	+29.066	14	
14	22	(United Kingdom) Tom Boardman	Special Tuning Racing	SEAT León WTCC	Y	11	+29.813	19	
15	12	(Italy) Pasquale Di Sabatino	bamboo-engineering	Chevrolet Cruze 1.6T	Y	11	+34.752	20	
16	23	(United Kingdom) Tom Chilton	Team Aon	Ford Focus S2000 TC		11	+42.163	22	
17	69	(United Kingdom) James Thompson	TMS Sport	Lada Granta WTCC		10	+1 Lap	17	
18	7	(Hong Kong) Charles Ng	Liqui Moly Team Engstler	BMW 320 TC	Y	9	+2 Laps	18	
Ret	14	(United Kingdom) James Nash	Team Aon	Ford Focus S2000 TC		7	Collision	21	
Ret	25	(Morocco) Mehdi Bennani	Proteam Racing	BMW 320 TC	Y	7	Collision	11	
Ret	27	(Hungary) Gábor Wéber	Zengő Motorsport	BMW 320 TC	Y	4	Collision	7	
Ret	4	(Russia) Aleksei Dudukalo	Lukoil Racing	SEAT León WTCC	Y	2	Collision	12	

- **Bold** denotes Fastest lap.

=== Race 2 ===
Pos.	No.	Name	Team	Car	C	Laps	Time/Retired	Grid	Points
1	8	(France) **Michel Vaillant** **(Alain Menu)**	Chevrolet	Chevrolet Cruze 1.6T		11	21:34.180	2	25
2	74	(Spain) Pepe Oriola	Tuenti Racing	SEAT León WTCC	Y	11	+3.200	1	18
3	15	(Netherlands) Tom Coronel	ROAL Motorsport	BMW 320 TC		11	+5.160	6	15
4	2	(United Kingdom) Robert Huff	Chevrolet	Chevrolet Cruze 1.6T		11	+6.961	7	12
5	1	(France) Yvan Muller	Chevrolet	Chevrolet Cruze 1.6T		11	+8.280	9	10
6	16	(Italy) Alberto Cerqui	ROAL Motorsport	BMW 320 TC	Y	11	+8.626	5	8
7	11	(United Kingdom) Alex MacDowall	bamboo-engineering	Chevrolet Cruze 1.6T	Y	11	+15.007	15	6
8	18	(Portugal) Tiago Monteiro	Tuenti Racing	SR León 1.6T		11	+15.874	3	4
9	6	(Germany) Franz Engstler	Liqui Moly Team Engstler	BMW 320 TC	Y	11	+16.264	13	2
10	5	(Hungary) Norbert Michelisz	Zengő Motorsport	BMW 320 TC	Y	11	+18.128	8	1
11	69	(United Kingdom) James Thompson	TMS Sport	Lada Granta WTCC		11	+19.832	21	
12	27	(Hungary) Gábor Wéber	Zengő Motorsport	BMW 320 TC	Y	11	+23.542	4	
13	20	(China) Darryl O'Young	Special Tuning Racing	SEAT León WTCC	Y	11	+28.326	14	
14	7	(Hong Kong) Charles Ng	Liqui Moly Team Engstler	BMW 320 TC	Y	11	+28.581	17	
15	23	(United Kingdom) Tom Chilton	Team Aon	Ford Focus S2000 TC		11	+30.552	20	
16	4	(Russia) Aleksei Dudukalo	Lukoil Racing	SEAT León WTCC	Y	11	+50.602	12	
17	12	(Italy) Pasquale Di Sabatino	bamboo-engineering	Chevrolet Cruze 1.6T	Y	10	+1 Lap	19	
18	26	(Italy) Stefano D'Aste	Wiechers-Sport	BMW 320 TC	Y	10	+1 Lap	16	
19	3	(Italy) Gabriele Tarquini	Lukoil Racing	SEAT León WTCC		8	+3 Laps	10	
Ret	14	(United Kingdom) James Nash	Team Aon	Ford Focus S2000 TC		7	Set Up	22	
Ret	25	(Morocco) Mehdi Bennani	Proteam Racing	BMW 320 TC	Y	3	Collision	11	
Ret	22	(United Kingdom) Tom Boardman	Special Tuning Racing	SEAT León WTCC	Y	2	Collision	18	

- **Bold** denotes Fastest lap.

== Standings after the round ==
Drivers' Championship standings

Pos	Driver	Points
1	(France) Yvan Muller	245
2	(United Kingdom) Robert Huff	227
3	(Switzerland) Alain Menu	210
4	(Netherlands) Tom Coronel	140
5	(Italy) Gabriele Tarquini	134

Yokohama Independents' Trophy standings

	Pos	Driver	Points
	1	(Spain) Pepe Oriola	106
	2	(Hungary) Norbert Michelisz	96
	3	(Italy) Stefano D'Aste	73
	4	(Germany) Franz Engstler	58
1	5	(United Kingdom) Alex MacDowall	50

Manufacturers' Championship standings

Pos	Manufacturer	Points
1	(United States) Chevrolet	578
2	(Germany) BMW Customer Racing Teams	389
3	(Spain) SEAT Racing Technology	370

- Note: Only the top five positions are included for both sets of drivers' standings.
