= Stian Paulsen =

Norwegian racing driver (born 1987)

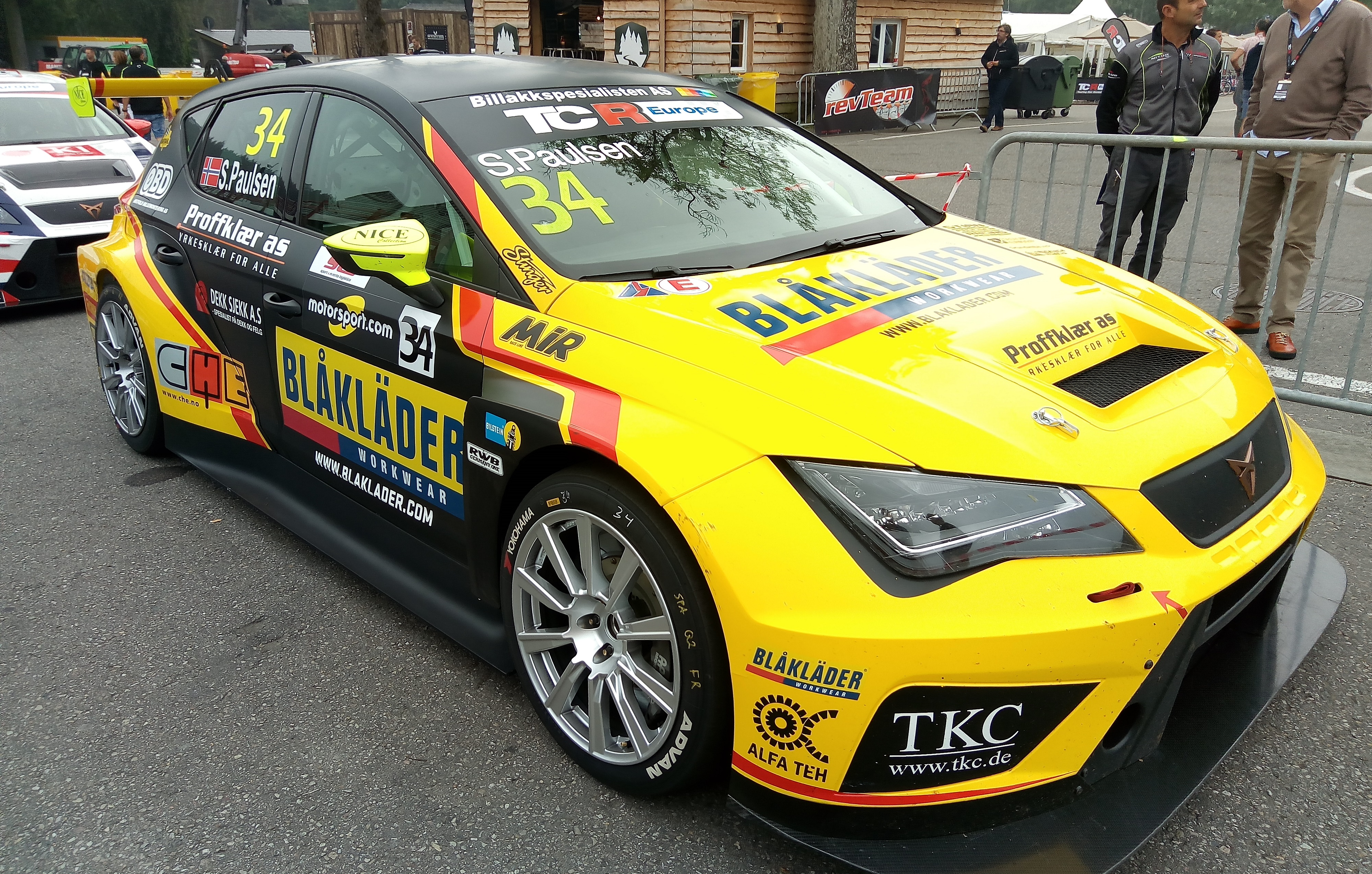
- Paulsen SEAT Cupra in 2018
- Nationality: Norwegian
- Born: 3 July 1987 (age 39) Fredrikstad, Norway

TCR Europe career
- Debut season: 2018
- Current team: Stian Paulsen Racing
- Car number: 34
- Former teams: Comtoyou Racing
- Starts: 26
- Wins: 0
- Poles: 0
- Fastest laps: 0
- Best finish: 9th in 2018

Previous series
- 2017 2012 2010, 14-16 2010-11 2008 2008-09 2006-07 2004-05: TCR International Series; European Touring Car Cup; SEAT León Eurocup; SEAT León Supercopa Germany; Renault Clio Cup Denmark; Renault Clio Cup Belgium; ADAC Volkswagen Polo Cup; Karting

Championship titles
- 2012 2008: ETCC – Single-Makes Trophy; Renault Clio Cup Belgium – Junior Cup

Stian Paulsen (born 3 July 1987) is a Norwegian racing driver. He currently competes in the TCR Europe Touring Car Series with his own team Stian Paulsen Racing and in TCR World Tour for Vannin Motorsport.

Paulsen previously raced in TCR International Series, European Touring Car Cup, SEAT León Eurocup and ADAC Volkswagen Polo Cup amongst others.

== Racing career ==
Paulsen began his career in 2004 in karting. He switched to the ADAC Volkswagen Polo Cup for 2006, he stayed there for season 2007, taking four victories on his way to finishing third in the championship standings. In 2008, he switched to the Belgian Renault Clio Cup, winning the Junior Cup that year, as well as finishing third in the overall championship standings. He stayed in the series for another year, however only doing a half season, he took one win and finished eleventh in the standings. For 2010, he switched to the SEAT León Eurocup and ended the season thirteenth in the standings. In 2011, he moved to the German SEAT León Supercopa series, having done a single one-off in 2010. He took a single victory on his way to finishing ninth in the championship standings that year. For 2012, he entered the European Touring Car Cups Single-Makes Trophy which allowed him to continue to use his SEAT León Supercopa, he took five victories and never finished out of the top-two in any of the eight races. He eventually won the championship title. In 2014 he returned to the SEAT León Eurocup, taking three wins and six podiums, he finished the season fifth in the championship standings. He continued in the series for 2015 and 2016, taking two victories and six podiums in 2015 as well as finishing second in the standings, while he took three victories and eight podiums in 2016 on his way to finishing third in the standings.

In March 2017, it was announced that Paulsen would race in the TCR International Series, driving a SEAT León TCR for his own team Stian Paulsen Racing.

Paulsen raced in TCR Europe in 2018 and 2019 both for his own team, with a best finish of second in 2018 Hungarian round.

In June 2022, after two years away from races, Paulsen joined Comtoyou DHL Team Audi Sport for TCR Europe fourth round at Norisring in place of Tom Coronel.

After four years from his last race, in May 2026, Paulsen re-joined the TCR Europe grid for the second round of the championship at Spa-Francorchamps once again with his own team: Stian Paulsen Racing.

On 9 July, Paulsen shared via social media his last minute participation in the 2026 TCR World Tour race in Portugal at the Circuito Internacional de Vila Real, driving an Audi RS 3 LMS for British team Vannin Motorsport.

== Racing record ==
=== Complete TCR International Series results ===
(key) (Races in bold indicate pole position) (Races in italics indicate fastest lap)

Year	Team	Car	1	2	3	4	5	6	7	8	9	10	11	12	13	14	15	16	17	18	19	20	DC	Points
2017	Stian Paulsen Racing	SEAT León TCR	RIM; 1	RIM; 2	BHR; 1	BHR; 2	SPA; 1; 23	SPA; 2 Ret	MNZ; 1; 13	MNZ; 2 Ret	SAL; 1 Ret	SAL; 2 Ret	HUN; 1 Ret	HUN; 2; 8	OSC; 1 DSQ	OSC; 2 Ret	CHA; 1	CHA; 2	ZHE; 1	ZHE; 2	DUB; 1	DUB; 2	30th	4

=== Complete TCR Europe Touring Car Series results ===
(key) (Races in bold indicate pole position) (Races in italics indicate fastest lap)

Year	Team	Car	1	2	3	4	5	6	7	8	9	10	11	12	13	14	DC	Points
2018	Stian Paulsen Racing	CUPRA León TCR	LEC; 1; 8^{4}	LEC; 2 Ret	ZAN; 1; 6	ZAN; 2 Ret	SPA; 1; 13^{5}	SPA; 2; 5	HUN; 1; 2	HUN; 2; 10	ASS; 1; 8	ASS; 2; 5	MNZ; 1; 9	MNZ; 2 Ret	CAT; 1; 11	CAT; 2; 9	9th	62
2019	Stian Paulsen Racing	CUPRA León TCR	HUN; 1	HUN; 2	HOC; 1 Ret	HOC; 2 Ret	SPA; 1; 8	SPA; 2; 27†	RBR; 1 Ret	RBR; 2; 22†	OSC; 1	OSC; 2	CAT; 1	CAT; 2	MNZ; 1; 12	MNZ; 2; 27	26th	22
2022	Comtoyou DHL Team Audi Sport	Audi RS 3 LMS TCR	ALG; 1	ALG; 2	LEC; 1	LEC; 2	SPA; 1	SPA; 2	NOR; 1; 8	NOR; 2; 14	NÜR; 1	NÜR; 2	MNZ; 1	MNZ; 2	CAT; 1	CAT; 2	22nd	18
2026	Stian Paulsen Racing	Audi RS 3 LMS TCR	MUG; 1	MUG; 2	SPA; 1; 14	SPA; 2; 18	LEC; 1	LEC; 2	HUN; 1	HUN; 2	MNZ; 1	MNZ; 2	CAT; 1	CAT; 2			31st	2

^{†} Driver did not finish, but was classified as he completed over 90% of the race distance.

=== Complete TCR World Tour results ===
(key) (Races in bold indicate pole position) (Races in italics indicate fastest lap)

Year	Team	Car	1	2	3	4	5	6	7	8	9	10	11	12	13	14	15	16	17	18	19	20	DC	Points
2026	Vannin Motorsport	Audi RS 3 LMS TCR (2021)	MIS; 1	MIS; 2	CRT; 1	CRT; 2	CRT; 3	LEC; 1	LEC; 2	CVR; 1; 12	CVR; 2 Ret	INJ; 1	INJ; 2	INJ; 3	CHE; 1	CHE; 2	CHE; 3	ZHZ; 1	ZHZ; 2	ZHZ; 3	MAC; 1	MAC; 2	43rd*	4*
