= Gábor Wéber =

Hungarian auto racing driver (born 1971)

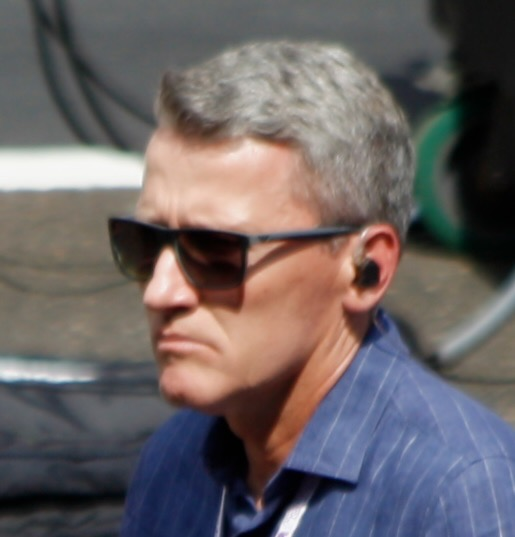
- Nationality: Hungarian
- Born: 4 December 1971 (age 54) Budapest (Hungary)

Previous series
- 2012 2011 2008-2010 2007–2008 2003-2006 2002: WTCC; German SEAT León Supercopa; SEAT León Eurocup; Hungarian SEAT León Cup; Hungarian Renault Clio Cup; Hungarian Opel Astra Cup

Championship titles
- 2010 2003, 2004: SEAT León Eurocup; Hungarian Renault Clio Cup

Gábor Wéber (born 4 December 1971 in Budapest) is a Hungarian auto racing driver who competed in one race of the 2003 Porsche Supercup. Since 2008 he has been competing in the SEAT León Eurocup, and he won the 2010 season with the Zengő-Dension Team. He made his debut in the World Touring Car Championship in 2012 with Zengő Motorsport. He also is a commentator of the Formula One coverage on Hungarian TV channel Hungarian Television M4 Sport.

== Racing career ==
=== World Touring Car Championship ===
==== Zengő Motorsport (2012) ====
Wéber moved up to the 2012 season of the FIA World Touring Car Championship where he drove a BMW 320 TC for Zengő Motorsport alongside Norbert Michelisz. He was forced to miss the Race of Morocco due to financial issues and was only expected to compete in the European rounds of the championship as a result. In race two of the Race of Hungary, he collided with TMS Sport driver James Thompson and was issued with a drive-through penalty for his involvement in the incident. The Race of Portugal saw Wéber collide with Lukoil Racing driver Aleksei Dudukalo sending both cars into the gravel traps; they were able to return to the pits to retire their cars after the incident. He skipped the next round in Brazil due to an insufficient budget. He aimed to return to the championship in 2013.

== Racing record ==
=== Complete World Touring Car Championship results ===
(key) (Races in bold indicate pole position) (Races in italics indicate fastest lap)

Year	Team	Car	1	2	3	4	5	6	7	8	9	10	11	12	13	14	15	16	17	18	19	20	21	22	23	24	DC	Points
2012	Zengő Motorsport	BMW 320 TC	ITA; 1; 17	ITA; 2; 11	ESP; 1; 17	ESP; 2 Ret	MAR; 1	MAR; 2	SVK; 1; 9	SVK; 2 Ret	HUN; 1; 10	HUN; 2; 17	AUT; 1; 15	AUT; 2; 12	POR; 1 Ret	POR; 2; 12	BRA; 1	BRA; 2	USA; 1	USA; 2	JPN; 1	JPN; 2	CHN; 1	CHN; 2	MAC; 1	MAC; 2	23rd	3

Sporting positions
Preceded by Norbert Michelisz	SEAT León Eurocup champion 2010	Succeeded by Pol Rosell
