= JSB Compétition =

French auto racing team based in Camps-en-Amienois, France

(France) JSB Compétition
- Founded: 2007
- Team principal(s): Julien Briché
- Current series: TCR International Series; SEAT León Eurocup; Renault Clio Cup
- Noted drivers: TCR; 11. (France) Lucile Cypriano; 32. (Spain) David Cebrián; SEAT León Eurocup; 3. (France) Julien Briché; 5. (France) Thibaut Morgues; 9. (France) Lucile Cypriano; 16. (France) Pierre Etiene Chaumat; 21. (France) Marie Baus-Coppens

JSB Compétition is a French auto racing team based in Camps-en-Amiénois, France. The team has raced in the SEAT León Eurocup & TCR International Series, since 2014 & 2015 respectively.

== TCR International Series ==
=== SEAT León Cup Racer (2015–) ===
After having raced in the SEAT León Eurocup in 2014, the team will enter the 2015 TCR International Series season with Lucile Cypriano and David Cebrián driving an SEAT León Cup Racer each.
