= MotorLand Aragón =

Motorsports racetrack in Alcañiz, Spain

- Configuration for FIA sanctioned events

- Configuration for FIM sanctioned events
- Location: Alcañiz, Aragon, Spain
- Coordinates: 41°4′42″N 0°12′27″W
- Capacity: 129,500
- FIA Grade: 1 (11 layouts); 3 (4 layouts)
- Broke ground: December 2005; 20 years ago
- Opened: 6 September 2009; 17 years ago
- Architect: Hermann Tilke
- Major events: Current: Grand Prix motorcycle racing Aragon motorcycle Grand Prix (2010–2022, 2024–present); Teruel motorcycle Grand Prix (2020); World SBK (2011–present); Former: Eurocup-3 (2023–2024); European Le Mans Series (2023); WTCR; Race of Spain (2020–2022); Race of Aragón (2020); Pure ETCR (2021); Sidecar World Championship (2013–2014); World Series Formula V8 3.5 (2009–2017); Racecar Euro Series (2011)
- Website: http://www.motorlandaragon.com/

FIA Grand Prix Circuit (2009–present)
- Length: 5.345 km (3.321 mi)
- Turns: 18
- Race lap record: 1:41.376 ( (France) Arthur Pic, Dallara T12, 2012, Formula Renault 3.5)

FIM Grand Prix Circuit (2009–present)
- Length: 5.078 km (3.155 mi)
- Turns: 16
- Race lap record: 1:43.691 ( (United Kingdom) Mike Simpson, Ginetta G57 P2, 2016, Sports prototype)

National Circuit (2009–present)
- Length: 2.646 km (1.644 mi)
- Turns: 13
- Race lap record: 1:11.181 ( (Brazil) Augusto Farfus, Hyundai Veloster N ETCR, 2021, ETCR)

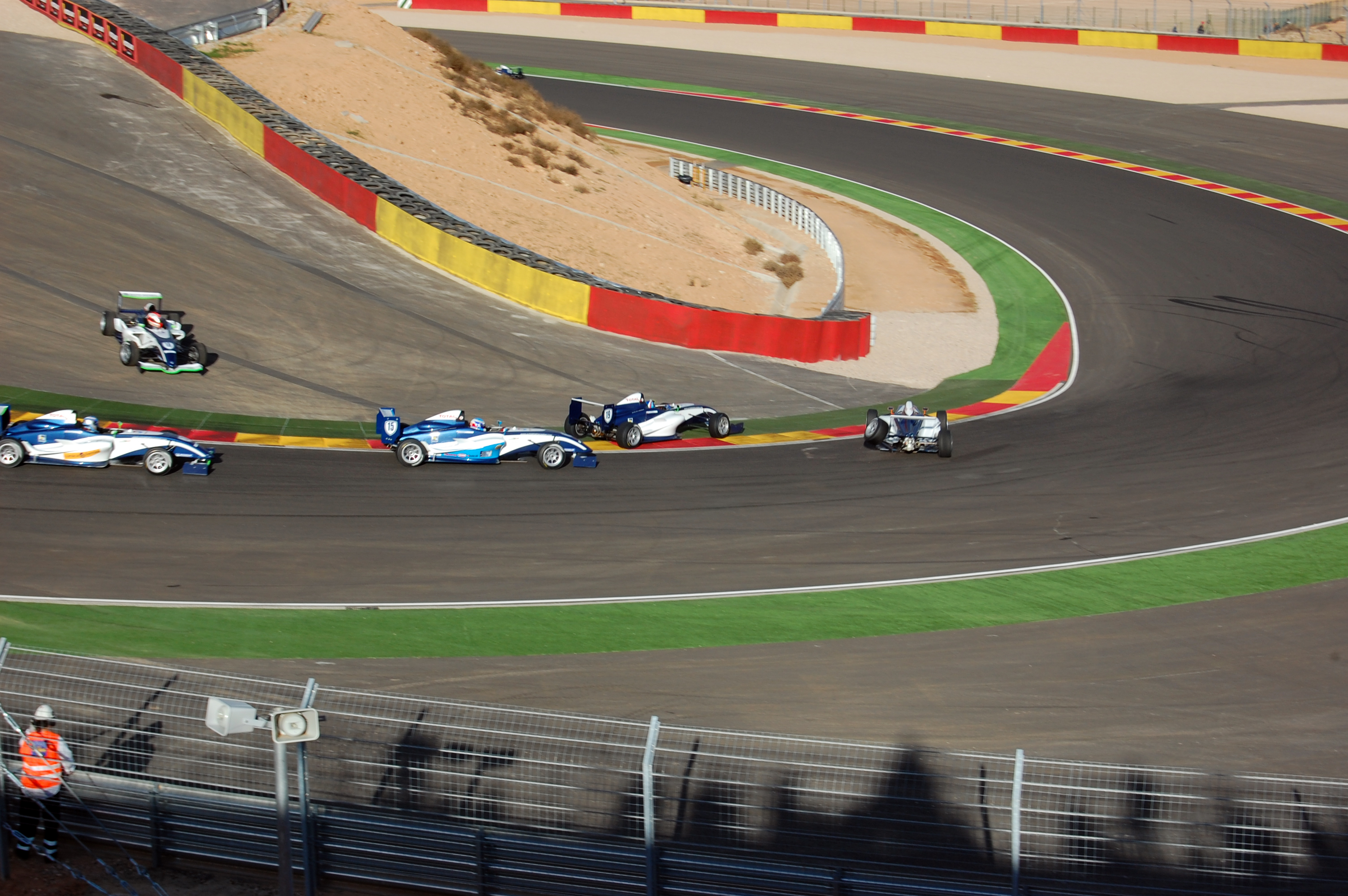
A race in the Formul'Academy Euro Series at Ciudad del Motor de Aragón (2009)

MotorLand Aragón (alternative Spanish name: Circuito de Alcañiz) is a 5.344 km (3.321 mi) race track used for motorsports located in Alcañiz, Spain.

The circuit was designed by German architect Hermann Tilke in conjunction with the British architectural business Foster and Partners. Formula One driver Pedro de la Rosa was a technical and sporting consultant on the project.

The facility has been designed to incorporate three main zones; a technology park, a sports area and a leisure and culture area. The technology park will feature research and educational institutes related to the motor industry, the sports area will include the racing circuit (with multiple layouts), a karting track and various gravel circuits, whilst the leisure and culture section will feature a hotel, business centre and shopping facilities.

== History ==
It was announced on 26 May 2008 that the circuit would host a round of the World Series by Renault in 2009, the first international championship to race at the venue. The event had returned to Aragón every year since, until the end of the championship in 2015. Renault Sport Technologies had access to the circuit for thirty days per year for testing and promotional events. When the World Series by Renault championship was discontinued at the end of 2015 and was relaunched in 2016 as Formula V8 3.5, the circuit continued to be part of the schedule. The race remained on the championship for the 2017 season, at the end of which the championship was discontinued.

On 18 March 2010, MotorLand Aragón was announced as a replacement for the Balatonring on the 2010 MotoGP calendar. Aragón was already in place as a reserve event and replaced the Hungarian race which was postponed because of overrunning construction work. This made the Aragon motorcycle Grand Prix the fourth Spanish race on the calendar. In March 2011, Dorna Sports signed a contract with the circuit to make it a permanent entry on the main calendar until at least 2016. On 19 May 2010, it was announced that the circuit will hold a round of the Superbike World Championship from 2011, with a three-year deal being agreed.

The circuit was used as part of stage 7 of the 2012 Vuelta a España.

The circuit was planned to host round 6 of the 2020 World Touring Car Cup on 5 July, replacing Circuit Zandvoort on the calendar. However, due to the COVID-19 pandemic, the race was postponed. The circuit instead hosted two WTCR rounds (Race of Spain, Race of Aragón) on 31 October – 1 November and 14–15 November respectively. The circuit continued to host WTCR races until 2022.

== Layout configurations ==
MotorLand Aragón Layout Configurations
FIA Grand Prix Circuit (2009–present)

FIM Grand Prix Circuit (2009–present)

FIA National Circuit (2009–present)

FIM National Circuit (2009–present)

Karting Circuit (2009–present)

Autocross Circuit (2009–present)

== Fatalities ==
On 25 July 2021, during the 2021 European Talent Cup, Hugo Millán died in a crash. He was 14 at the time.

On July 21, 2025, Spanish JuniorGP racer Pau Alsina died during a practice session at this track.

== Events ==
Current

- March: Formula Winter Series, GT Winter Series, GT4 Winter Series, Prototype Winter Series, Eurocup-3 Spanish Winter Championship, Eurocup-4 Spanish Winter Championship, GT-CER
- May: Superbike World Championship, Supersport World Championship, Sportbike World Championship, Yamaha R3 bLU cRU FIM World Cup
- June: F4 Spanish Championship, GR Cup Spain, GT-CER
- July: Campeonato de España de Superbike
- August: Grand Prix motorcycle racing Aragon motorcycle Grand Prix, Harley-Davidson Bagger World Cup
- September: FIM Moto3 Junior World Championship, FIM Moto2 European Championship, Moto4 European Cup

Former

- Eurocup-3 (2023–2024)
- Eurocup Clio (2013–2014)
- Eurocup Formula Renault 2.0 (2009–2016)
- Eurocup Mégane Trophy (2009, 2011–2013)
- European Le Mans Series
  - 4 Hours of Aragón (2023)
- F4 Eurocup 1.6 (2009–2010)
- Grand Prix motorcycle racing
  - Teruel motorcycle Grand Prix (2020)
- Le Mans Cup (2023)
- Ligier European Series (2023)
- Racecar Euro Series (2011)
- Pure ETCR (2021)
- Red Bull MotoGP Rookies Cup (2012–2022, 2024–2025)
- Renault Sport Trophy (2016)
- Sidecar World Championship (2013–2014)
- Supersport 300 World Championship (2017–2025)
- TCR Spain Touring Car Championship (2021–2022, 2025)
- Ultimate Cup Series (2025)
- V de V Sports (2010–2012, 2014–2016)
- Vuelta a España (2012)
- World Series Formula V8 3.5 (2009–2017)
- World Touring Car Cup
  - Race of Aragón (2020)
  - Race of Spain (2020–2022)

== Lap records ==
As of August 2026, the fastest official race lap records at the MotorLand Aragón are listed as:

Category	Time	Driver	Vehicle	Event
FIA Grand Prix Circuit (2009–present): 5.345 km (3.321 mi)
Formula Renault 3.5	1:41.376	Arthur Pic	Dallara T12	2012 Aragón Formula Renault 3.5 Series round
LMP2	1:48.792	Malthe Jakobsen	Oreca 07	2023 4 Hours of Aragón
Eurocup-3	1:49.451	Thomas Strauven	Dallara 326	2026 Aragón Eurocup-3 Spanish Winter Championship round
LMP3	1:50.697	Danny Soufi	Ligier JS P320	2025 Aragón Prototype Winter Series round
Formula Regional	1:51.584	Valerio Rinicella	Tatuus F3 T-318-EC3	2025 Aragón Eurocup-3 Spanish Winter Championship round
Renault Sport Trophy	1:54.451	Markus Palttala	Renault Sport R.S. 01	2016 Aragón Renault Sport Trophy round
GT3	1:54.691	Jay Mo Härtling	Mercedes-AMG GT3 Evo	2026 Aragón GT Winter Series round
Lamborghini Super Trofeo	1:55.153	Jerzy Spinkiewicz	Lamborghini Huracán Super Trofeo Evo 2	2025 Aragón GT Winter Series round
Formula Renault 2.0	1:55.950	Max Defourny	Tatuus FR2.0/13	2016 Aragón Eurocup Formula Renault 2.0 round
Ferrari Challenge	1:56.455	Cristiano Maciel	Ferrari 296 Challenge	2025 Aragón GT Winter Series round
LM GTE	1:56.853	Martin Rump	Porsche 911 RSR-19	2023 4 Hours of Aragón
SRO GT2	1:57.629	Daniel Carretero	Audi R8 LMS GT2	2025 Aragón Campeonato de España de GT round
World SBK	1:57.664	Tom Sykes	Kawasaki Ninja ZX-10R	2014 Aragón World SBK round
Formula 4	1:58.030	Maciej Gladysz	Tatuus F4-T421	2024 Aragón F4 Spain round
Porsche Carrera Cup	1:58.140	Borja García	Porsche 911 (992 I) GT3 Cup	2025 Aragón Campeonato de España de GT round
World SSP	2:01.708	Jules Cluzel	MV Agusta F3 675	2014 Aragón World SSP round
Eurocup Mégane Trophy	2:02.489	Bas Schothorst	Renault Mégane Renault Sport II	2012 Aragón Eurocup Mégane Trophy round
JS P4	2:02.490	George King	Ligier JS P4	2023 Aragón Ligier European Series round
GT4	2:03.631	Enrico Förderer	Mercedes-AMG GT4	2025 Aragón GT4 Winter Series round
TCR Touring Car	2:05.396	Felipe Fernández Gil	Honda Civic Type R TCR (FL5)	2025 Aragón TCR Spain round
JS2 R	2:08.679	Henrique Varela	Ligier JS2 R	2025 Aragón Campeonato de España de GT round
Formula Renault 1.6	2:09.681	Julien Deschamps	Signatech FR 1.6	2009 Aragón Formul'Academy Euro Series round
Renault Clio Cup	2.19.047	Oscar Nogués	Renault Clio III RS (197)	2014 Aragón Eurocup Clio round
Toyota GR Cup	2:22.670	Antonio Albacete Jr.	Toyota GR86	2025 Aragón Toyota GR Cup Spain round
FIM Grand Prix Circuit (2009–present): 5.078 km (3.155 mi)
Sports prototype	1:43.691	Mike Simpson	Ginetta G57	2016 Aragón V de V Endurance Series round
MotoGP	1:45.704	Marc Márquez	Ducati Desmosedici GP23	2024 Aragon motorcycle Grand Prix
World SBK	1:47.709	Nicolò Bulega	Ducati Panigale V4 R	2026 Aragón World SBK round
GT3	1:50.074	Maxime Jousse	Renault R.S. 01	2016 Aragón V de V Endurance Series round
Moto2	1:50.198	Iván Ortolá	Kalex Moto2	2026 Aragon motorcycle Grand Prix
Formula 4	1:51.143	Richard Verschoor	Tatuus F4-T014	2016 Aragón F4 Spain round
World SSP	1:52.797	Stefano Manzi	Yamaha YZF-R6	2024 Aragón World SSP round
Moto3	1:56.675	Marco Morelli	KTM RC250GP	2026 Aragon motorcycle Grand Prix
Bagger World Cup	1:56.754	Andrea Iannone	Harley-Davidson Road Glide	2026 Aragon Harley-Davidson Bagger World Cup round
World SPB	1:58.961	David Salvador	Kawasaki ZX-6R 636	2026 Aragón World SPB round
125cc	1:59.509	Pol Espargaró	Derbi RSA 125	2010 Aragon motorcycle Grand Prix
TCR Touring Car	2:00.359	Mike Halder	Honda Civic Type R TCR (FK8)	2021 Aragón TCR Spain round
Supersport 300	2:05.823	Phillip Tonn	KTM RC 390 R	2024 Aragón Supersport 300 round
National Circuit (2009–present): 2.646 km (1.644 mi)
ETCR	1:11.181	Augusto Farfus	Hyundai Veloster N ETCR	2021 Aragón Pure ETCR round
FIA Grand Prix Circuit with Chicanes (2020): 5.397 km (3.354 mi)
TCR Touring Car	2:15.272	Santiago Urrutia	Lynk & Co 03 TCR	2020 WTCR Race of Aragón
