= 2021 Pure ETCR Championship =

Car racing series

The 2021 Pure ETCR Championship was the inaugural season of Pure ETCR, a touring car series for electric cars. It started on 18 June and featured cars from three manufacturers racing at five different locations. Swedish driver Mattias Ekström was crowned champion of the season, while Cupra won the manufacturer's championship.

== Race format ==
Because only six cars are ready for the first season (two for each team), the twelve drivers are randomly drawn into two groups ("Pool A" and "Pool B") for each race weekend. Throughout the weekend, a driver never directly faces a driver from the other pool. Points are collected in a series of short races and the driver with the most points will be the overall winner, called "king of the weekend".

The first two rounds are short races with two or three cars (called "battles"): Round 1 consists of four battles (two per pool) of three randomly drawn drivers each. In each pool, the two winners of each round 1 battle face each other in round 2, so do the two runner-ups and the two third-place drivers, for a total of six battles of 2 cars. Points are award in both rounds.

Round 3 are time trials to determine the grid for the final. No points are awarded in this round. Round 4 are the "superfinals" where the six cars from each pool race against each other.

== Teams and drivers ==
Three teams are participate in the first season, each developing a different car.

Team	Car	No	Drivers	Rounds	Ref.
(South Korea) Hyundai Motorsport N	Hyundai Veloster N ETCR	3	(United Kingdom) Tom Chilton	All	
(South Korea) Hyundai Motorsport N	Hyundai Veloster N ETCR	8	(Brazil) Augusto Farfus	All	
(South Korea) Hyundai Motorsport N	Hyundai Veloster N ETCR	27	(France) John Filippi	All	
(South Korea) Hyundai Motorsport N	Hyundai Veloster N ETCR	69	(France) Jean-Karl Vernay	All	
(Hungary) Cupra X Zengő Motorsport	Cupra e-Racer	5	(Sweden) Mattias Ekström	All	
(Hungary) Cupra X Zengő Motorsport	Cupra e-Racer	28	(Spain) Jordi Gené	All	
(Hungary) Cupra X Zengő Motorsport	Cupra e-Racer	96	(Spain) Mikel Azcona	All	
(Hungary) Cupra X Zengő Motorsport	Cupra e-Racer	99	(Hungary) Dániel Nagy	All	
(Italy) Romeo Ferraris - M1RA	Alfa Romeo Giulia ETCR	6	(United Kingdom) Oliver Webb	1–3, 5	
(Italy) Romeo Ferraris - M1RA	Alfa Romeo Giulia ETCR	13	(Brazil) Rodrigo Baptista	All	
(Italy) Romeo Ferraris - M1RA	Alfa Romeo Giulia ETCR	15	(Austria) Philipp Eng	3–5	
(Italy) Romeo Ferraris - M1RA	Alfa Romeo Giulia ETCR	16	(Italy) Luigi Ferrara	4	
(Italy) Romeo Ferraris - M1RA	Alfa Romeo Giulia ETCR	25	(Italy) Luca Filippi	All	
(Italy) Romeo Ferraris - M1RA	Alfa Romeo Giulia ETCR	88	(Monaco) Stefano Coletti	1–2	

== Calendar ==
The calendar for the inaugural season featuring five races across Europe and Asia was revealed in February 2021.

Round	Circuit	Date
1	(Italy) ACI Vallelunga Circuit	18–20 June
2	(Spain) MotorLand Aragón (National Layout)	9–11 July
3	(Denmark) Copenhagen Historic Grand Prix	6–8 August
4	(Hungary) Hungaroring	20–22 August
5	(France) Circuit Pau-Arnos	15–17 October
Cancelled due to the COVID-19 pandemic
C	(South Korea) Inje Speedium	16–17 October

== Results and standings ==
=== Results ===
Round	Circuit/Location	Pool A Winner	Pool B Winner	Overall Winner	Winning Team	Winning Car
1	(Italy) ACI Vallelunga Circuit	(Spain) Mikel Azcona	(France) Jean-Karl Vernay	(Spain) Mikel Azcona	(Hungary) Cupra X Zengő Motorsport	Cupra e-Racer
2	(Spain) MotorLand Aragón	(Brazil) Augusto Farfus	(Sweden) Mattias Ekström	(Sweden) Mattias Ekström	(Hungary) Cupra X Zengő Motorsport	Cupra e-Racer
3	(Denmark) Copenhagen Historic Grand Prix	(Italy) Luca Filippi	(Austria) Philipp Eng	(Austria) Philipp Eng	(Italy) Romeo Ferraris - M1RA	Alfa Romeo Giulia ETCR
4	(Hungary) Hungaroring	(Austria) Philipp Eng	(Spain) Mikel Azcona	(Spain) Mikel Azcona	(Hungary) Cupra X Zengő Motorsport	Cupra e-Racer
5	(France) Circuit Pau-Arnos	(Brazil) Augusto Farfus	(France) Jean-Karl Vernay	(France) Jean-Karl Vernay	(South Korea) Hyundai Motorsport N	Hyundai Veloster N ETCR

Scoring system

Position	1st	2nd	3rd	4th	5th	6th
Round 1	15	10	4			
Round 2	12	6				
Round 3	no points					
Superfinal	50	42	35	27	20	15

=== Drivers' championship ===
Pos.	Driver	ITA (Italy)	ESP (Spain)	DEN (Denmark)	HUN (Hungary)	FRA (France)	Points
1	(Sweden) Mattias Ekström	3	1	3	3	8	320
2	(France) Jean-Karl Vernay	2	4	4	4	1	316
3	(Spain) Mikel Azcona	1	10	6	1	3	300
4	(Spain) Jordi Gené	4	6	5	6	7	260
5	(Brazil) Rodrigo Baptista	6	3	9	5	6	248
6	(Brazil) Augusto Farfus	11	2	8	11	2	224
7	(Italy) Luca Filippi	5	11	2	12	4	218
8	(Hungary) Dániel Nagy	9	9	10	8	10	178
9	(United Kingdom) Oliver Webb	8	5	7		9	177
10	(France) John Filippi	7	8	11	7	11	177
11	(Austria) Philipp Eng			1	2	12	159
12	(United Kingdom) Tom Chilton	12	7	12	10	5	145
13	(Italy) Luigi Ferrara				9		36
14	(Monaco) Stefano Coletti	10	12				22

Key
Colour	Result
Gold	Winner
Silver	2nd place
Bronze	3rd place
Green	Other points position
Black	Disqualified (DSQ)
White	Did not start (DNS)
White	Withdrew (WD)
White	Race cancelled (C)

=== Manufacturers' championship ===
Pos.	Manufacturer	Points
1	(Hungary) Cupra X Zengő Motorsport	646
2	(Italy) Romeo Ferraris - M1RA	579
3	(South Korea) Hyundai Motorsport N	578
