= ETouring Car World Cup =

Electrice touring race car

FIA ETCR eTouring Car World Cup
- Category: Touring cars
- Country: International
- Inaugural season: 2021
- Folded: 2023
- Teams: Hyundai Motorsport N, Cupra EKS, Romeo Ferraris - M1RA
- Constructors: Hyundai Motorsport, Cupra Racing, Alfa Romeo
- Tyre suppliers: Goodyear
- Last Drivers' champion: (France) Adrien Tambay
- Last Teams' champion: Cupra EKS

FIA ETCR – eTouring Car World Cup (Pure ETCR during its first season) was a touring car series for electric cars. It was the first multi-brand all-electric touring car championship and in 2022 obtained the status of an official FIA series. However, in March 2023, the promoter announced that the series would not be continued.

== History ==
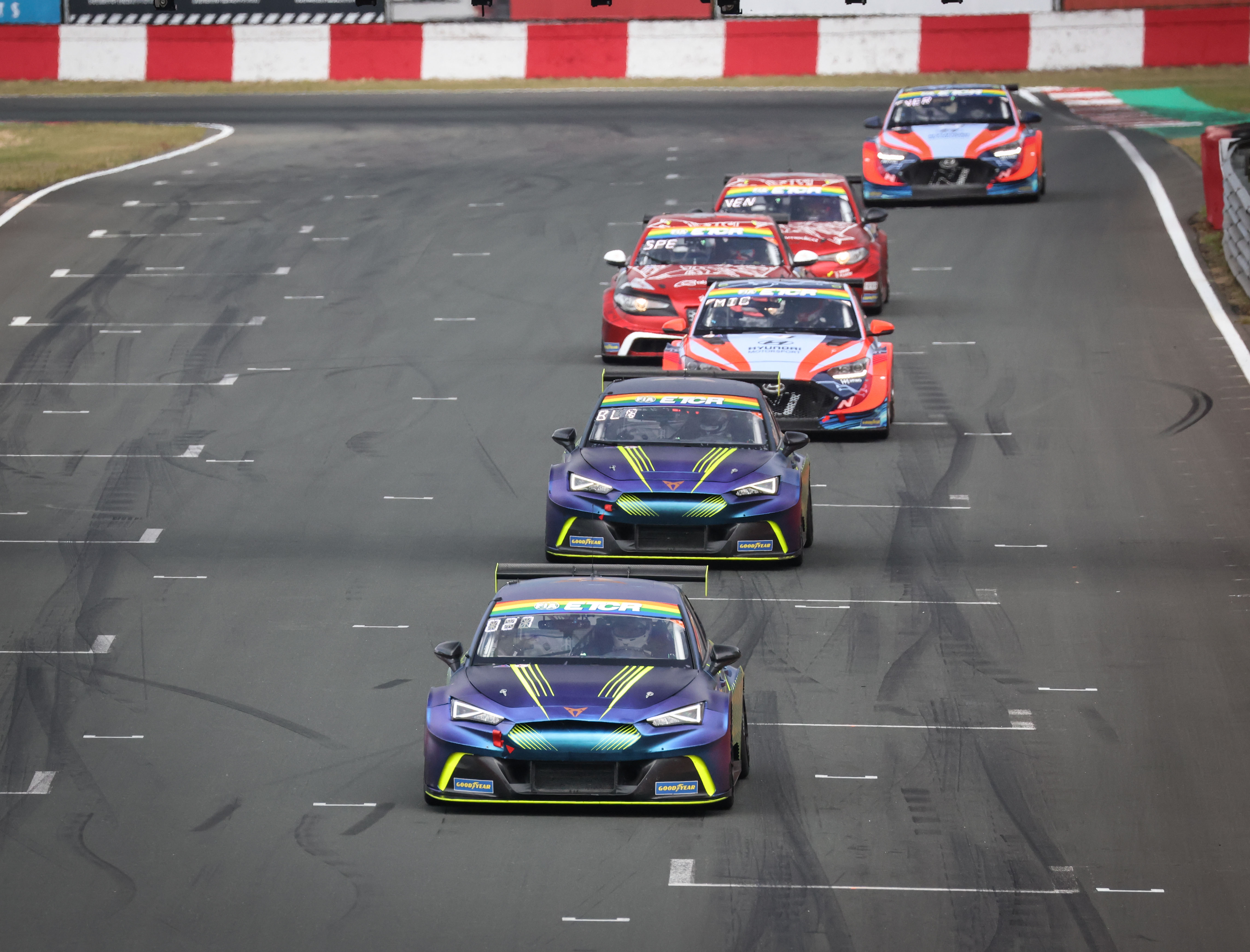
2022 Round 4 six-car superfinal at Circuit Zolder

The electric touring car series was presented together with the CUPRA 'e-Racer' car ahead of the 2018 Geneva Motor Show by TCR promoter WSC Ltd. In September 2019, Hyundai became the second manufacturer to commit to creating an ETCR car, the 'Veloster N ETCR', and in December, the Italian team Romeo Ferraris announced that they would build an Alfa Romeo Giulia according to ETCR specifications.

In February 2020, the series was rebranded as 'Pure ETCR' and a schedule of time trial events for 2020 was presented. However, due to the COVID-19 pandemic, development and testing was delayed by several months, making the original plan unfeasible. The series' official launch event eventually took place on 9 October in Copenhagen, where Hyundai Motorsport was officially announced as a competitor. A demonstration of the starting gates and the Hyundai Veloster was held during the WTCR event at the MotorLand Aragón in Spain on 13 November 2020. On the same weekend, Romeo Ferraris revealed their ETCR version of the Alfa Romeo Giulia.

The schedule for the inaugural season was announced in February 2021. The first Pure ETCR started on 18–20 June at the Autodromo Vallelunga in Italy, and ended in October at Circuit Pau-Arnos. Swedish driver Mattias Ekström was crowned champion of the season, while Cupra won the manufacturer's championship.

For the 2022 season, the series had FIA World Cup status and drivers and manufacturers competed for the FIA eTouring Car World Cup.

In March 2023, the promoter announced that the series would not be continued, citing that after discussions among the various stakeholders concerning the sporting and regulatory format, the necessary conditions could not be implemented in time for the start of the season.

== Specifications ==
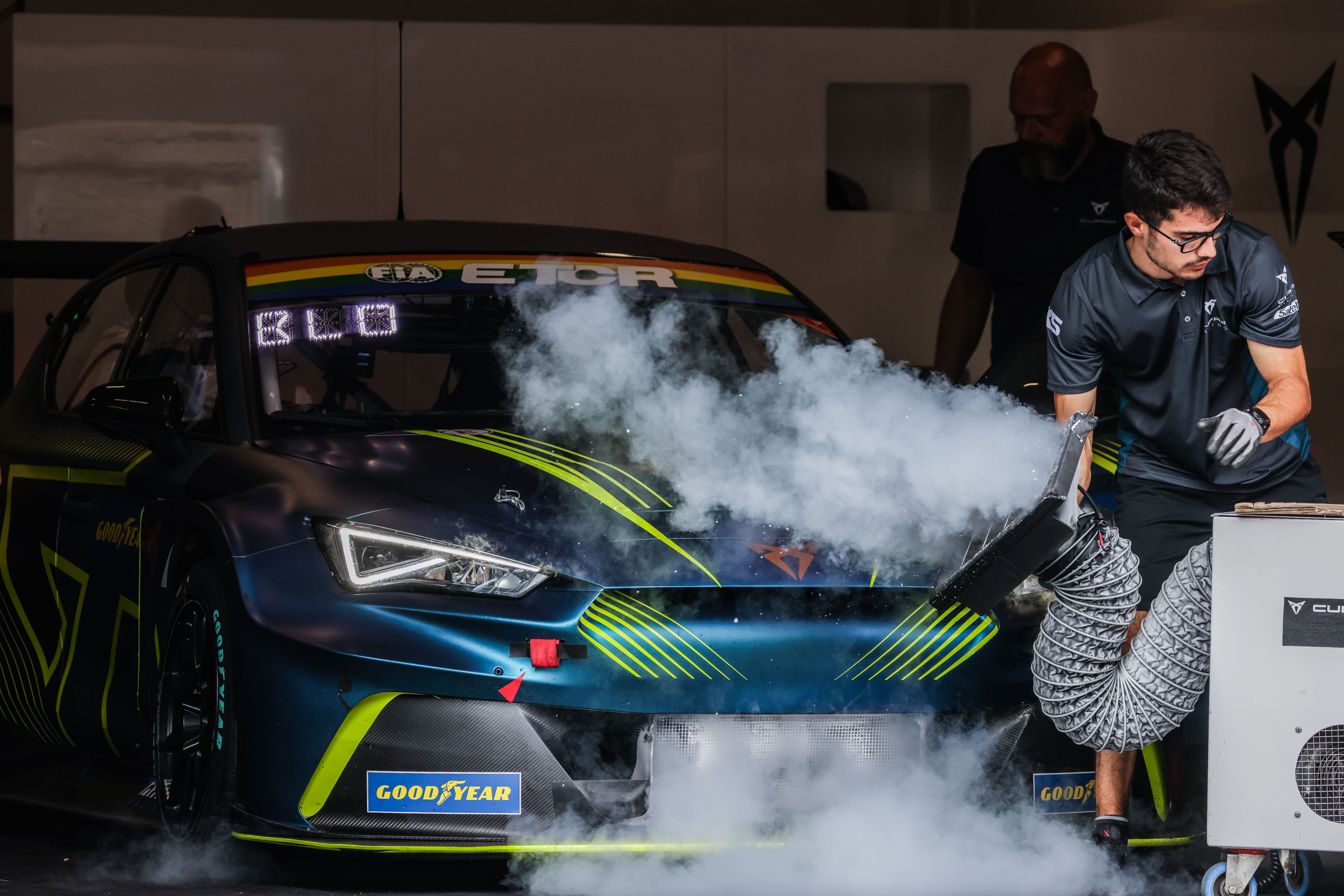
Cupra Racing team removing cooler

ETCR cars used spec powertrains supplied by the series organizers, with manufacturers using their own bodywork. The common kit includes motors, gearbox, inverter, battery, ECU and cooling system; ETCR technical regulations require a single-speed rear-drive chassis with MacPherson strut front suspension and double wishbone rear suspension.

The car had four electric motors on the rear axle, which deliver a maximum combined output of 300 kilowatts (410 PS; 400 hp) (continuous) and 500 kilowatts (680 PS; 670 hp) (peak, in the push-to-pass mode). The electric drivetrain unit (EDU) is capable of electronic torque vectoring by varying the power to each rear wheel. Inverter, motor, and gearbox are supplied by MAGELEC Propulsion.

The battery, developed by Williams Advanced Engineering, had a capacity of 62 kWh, operating at a voltage of 798 V. According to Williams, it could be charged from 10% to 90% state of charge in one hour on a 60 kW charger. Total range is 40 km (25 mi). It is centrally located on a subframe for better weight distribution, and accounts for nearly 1/3 of the total curb weight of 1,575 kg (3,472 lb), at 500 kg (1,100 lb). Williams also supply the vehicle control modules.

== Race format ==
The ETCR race format was different from standard touring car races, but instead, similar to a rallycross format with several rounds of short races and an elimination process leading to a final. The individual races were called 'battles' and were started from an opening gate and last for only a few laps. Each driver had a ‘push-to-pass’ power boost and a smaller ‘fightback’ boost for trying to reclaim a position. Between the battles, cars returned to a central ‘energy station’ where they could be recharged.

== Champions ==
Season	Driver	Team	Car
2021	(Sweden) Mattias Ekström	(Hungary) Cupra X Zengő Motorsport	Cupra e-Racer
2022	(France) Adrien Tambay	(Sweden) Cupra EKS	Cupra e-Racer

== Teams and cars ==
Three cars had been developed and were competing in the two seasons of ETCR:

Make	Model	Developer
Alfa Romeo	Alfa Romeo Giulia ETCR	(Italy) Romeo Ferraris
Cupra	Cupra e-Racer	(Spain) Cupra Racing
Hyundai	Hyundai Veloster N ETCR	(South Korea) Hyundai Motorsport

== See also ==
- Electric motorsport
- FIA Electric GT Championship
- World Touring Car Cup
