= Circuit Pau-Arnos =

Racetrack in France

Circuit Européen Pau-Arnos
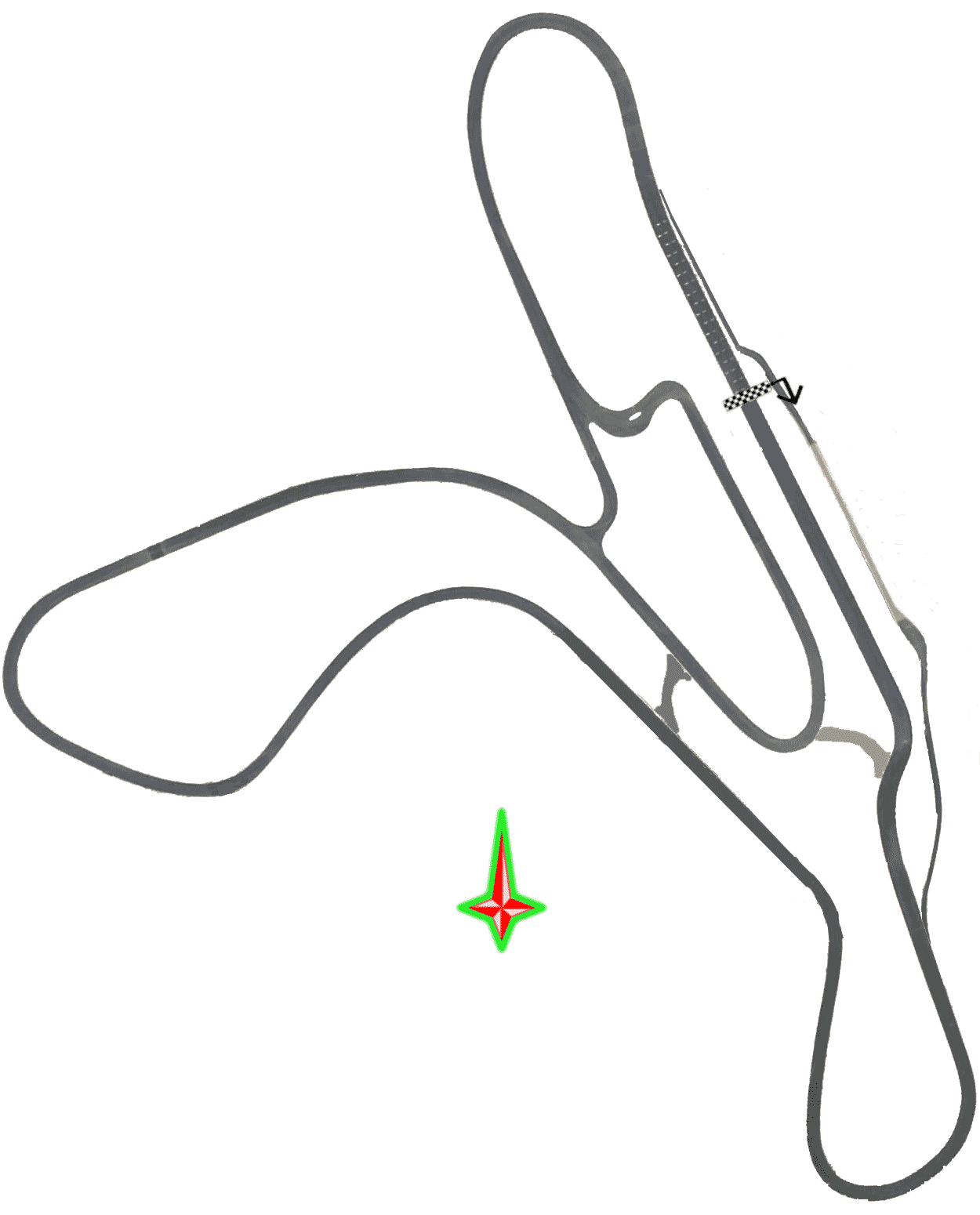
- Full Circuit (1986–present)
- Location: Arnos, France
- Coordinates: 43°26′39″N 000°31′50″W
- FIA Grade: 3
- Opened: 1986
- Major events: Current: Sidecar World Championship (2026); French Superbike Championship (1989–1994, 2000, 2016–present); Former: WTCR Race of France (2021); Pure ETCR (2021); FIM Superbike European Championship (1994); French F3 (1991)
- Website: http://www.circuit-pau-arnos.fr/

Full Circuit (1986–present)
- Length: 3.030 km (1.883 mi)
- Turns: 14
- Race lap record: 1:14.510 ( (France) Jean-Christophe Boullion, Ralt RT33, 1991, F3)

Short Circuit (1986–present)
- Length: 2.450 km (1.522 mi)
- Turns: 12

Circuit Européen Pau-Arnos is a club track in Arnos about 20 km (12 mi) to the west of the city Pau in southwestern France which is famous for its street circuit Circuit de Pau-Ville where the Pau Grand Prix is held.

== History ==
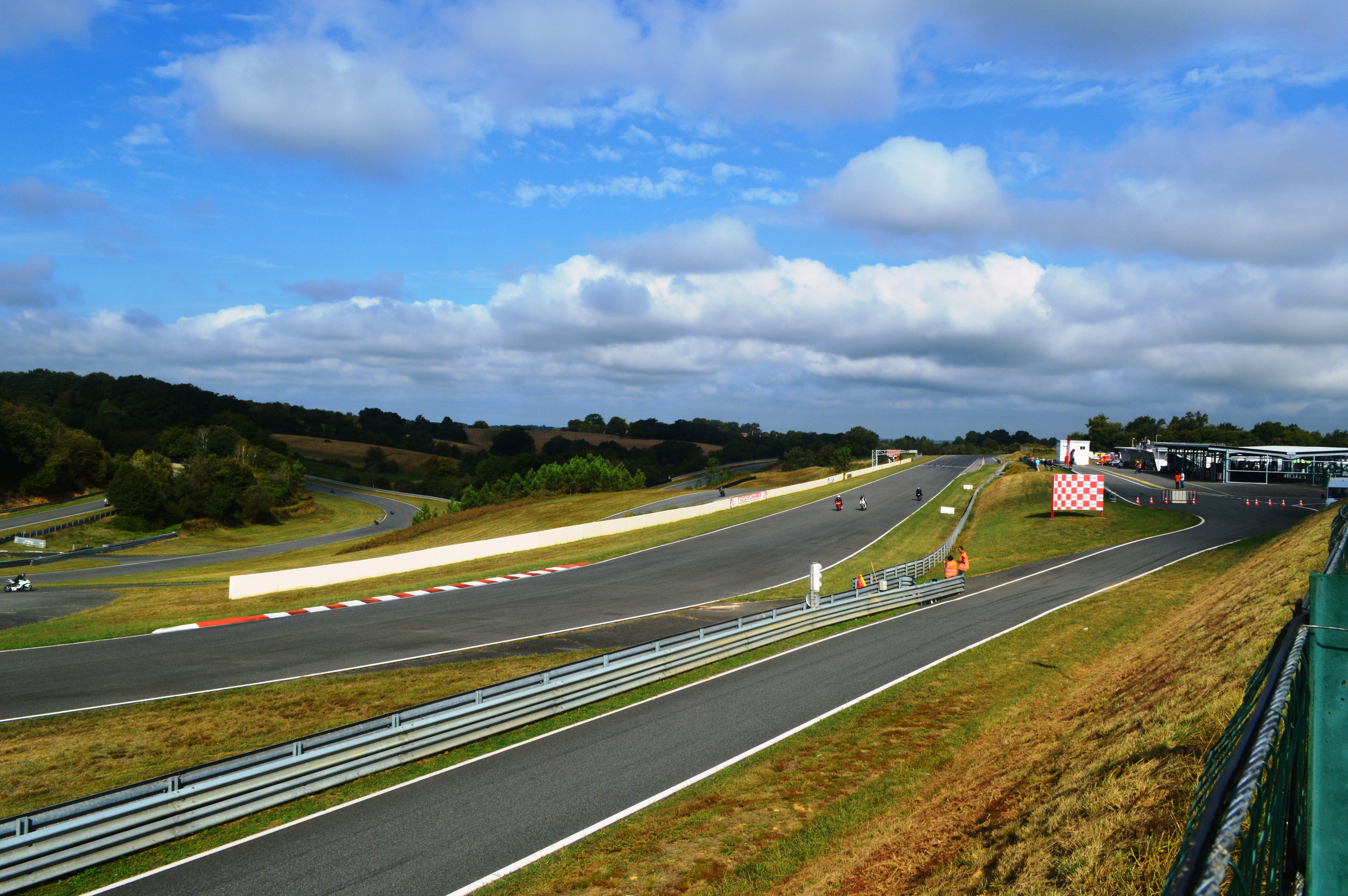
Circuit Pau-Arnos

The speed track for automobile and motorcycles is up to 3.030 km (1.883 mi) long and was opened in 1986. The nearby kart track is up to 900 m (3,000 ft) long. The site hosts track days, test drives, minor competitions and a race driver school.

On 19 August 2021, it was announced that the circuit to host races for WTCR and Pure ETCR. The WTCR became the first FIA series to visit the circuit.

== Lap records ==
The unofficial lap record (1:10.87) was set by Giedo van der Garde with Dallara F305 in 2005 during Formula 3 testing prior to the Pau Grand Prix. The all-electric Electric Production Car Series held tests with its race-prepped Tesla Model S P85 at the track. As of June 2026, the fastest official race lap records at the Circuit Européen Pau-Arnos are listed as:

Category	Time	Driver	Vehicle	Event
Full Circuit (1986–present): 3.030 km (1.883 mi)
Formula Three	1:14.510	Jean-Christophe Boullion	Ralt RT33	1991 Pau-Arnos French F3 round
Superbike	1:15.108	Grégory Leblanc	BMW M1000RR	2026 Pau-Arnos French Superbike round
Supersport	1:16.777	Mathieu Gines	Yamaha YZF-R9	2026 Pau-Arnos French Supersport round
TCR Touring Car	1:19.837	Frédéric Vervisch	Audi RS 3 LMS TCR (2021)	2021 WTCR Race of France
Pure ETCR	1:22.568	Philipp Eng	Alfa Romeo Giulia ETCR	2021 Pau-Arnos Pure ETCR round
Supersport 300	1:24.978	Killian Rossignol	Kawasaki Ninja 400	2024 Pau-Arnos French Supersport 300 round
