= Zengő Motorsport =

Hungarian motor racing team

(Hungary) Zengő Motorsport
- Founded: 1996
- Team principal(s): Zoltán Zengő
- Current series: Formula 4 CEZ Championship
- Former series: SEAT León Eurocup; WTCC; ETCC; WTCR; Pure ETCR
- Current drivers: 69. Benett Gáspár
- Teams' Championships: 2021 eTouring Car World Cup
- Drivers' Championships: 2009 SEAT León Eurocup (Michelisz); 2010 SEAT León Eurocup (Wéber); 2012 WTCC (Michelisz); 2015 WTCC (Michelisz); 2021 eTouring Car World Cup (Ekström)

Zengő Motorsport is a Hungarian motor racing team founded by Zoltán Zengő. They currently compete in the Formula 4 CEZ Championship. The team used to compete in the World Touring Car Cup, World Touring Car Championship and in the SEAT León Eurocup, where they won driver's titles in both 2009 and 2010, respectively.

== World Touring Car Championship ==
=== SEAT León TDI (2010) ===
The team ran a SEAT León 2.0 TDI in their first WTCC season in 2010 for Norbert Michelisz under the Zengő–Dension Team banner. The team was not eligible for the Yokohama Independent's Trophy because of a protest from other teams just before the season opener, claiming that the team has substantial factory support from SEAT Sport. They scored a point in their first ever WTCC race when Michelisz finished race one of the Race of Brazil in tenth place. Michelisz started second behind Andy Priaulx on the race two reversed grid at the Race of Morocco but stalled his car at the start of the race and went on to finish tenth. He started second behind Priaulx again in race two of the Race of Belgium but a slow start meant he dropped to eighth on the opening lap, he recovered to sixth by the end of the race. Michelisz started on the front row of race two once again at the Race of Portugal and passed pole sitter Fredy Barth at the start. He remained in the lead until lap four when he was passed by Chevrolet RML driver Alain Menu. Michelisz eventually dropped out of the race with water pressure issues. Michelisz retired from race one of the Race of the Czech Republic after clashing with Colin Turkington after the early safety car, also taking out championship leader Yvan Muller. Michelisz finished eighth in the race one of the Race of Germany and therefore started on pole position for race two. He was soon passed at the start by Priaulx and then bumped by Monteiro and dropped further down the order. He had been running eighth when he was tapped by Robert Huff and dropped out of the points to eleventh where he finished the race. After the BMW Team RBM drivers were disqualified from the results of the Race of Japan, Michelisz was promoted to third place in race one to take the first podium result for Zengő Motorsport in the WTCC. Michelisz won the final race of the season at the Race of Macau. He finished the season 9th in the drivers' standings.

=== BMW 320 TC (2011–2012) ===
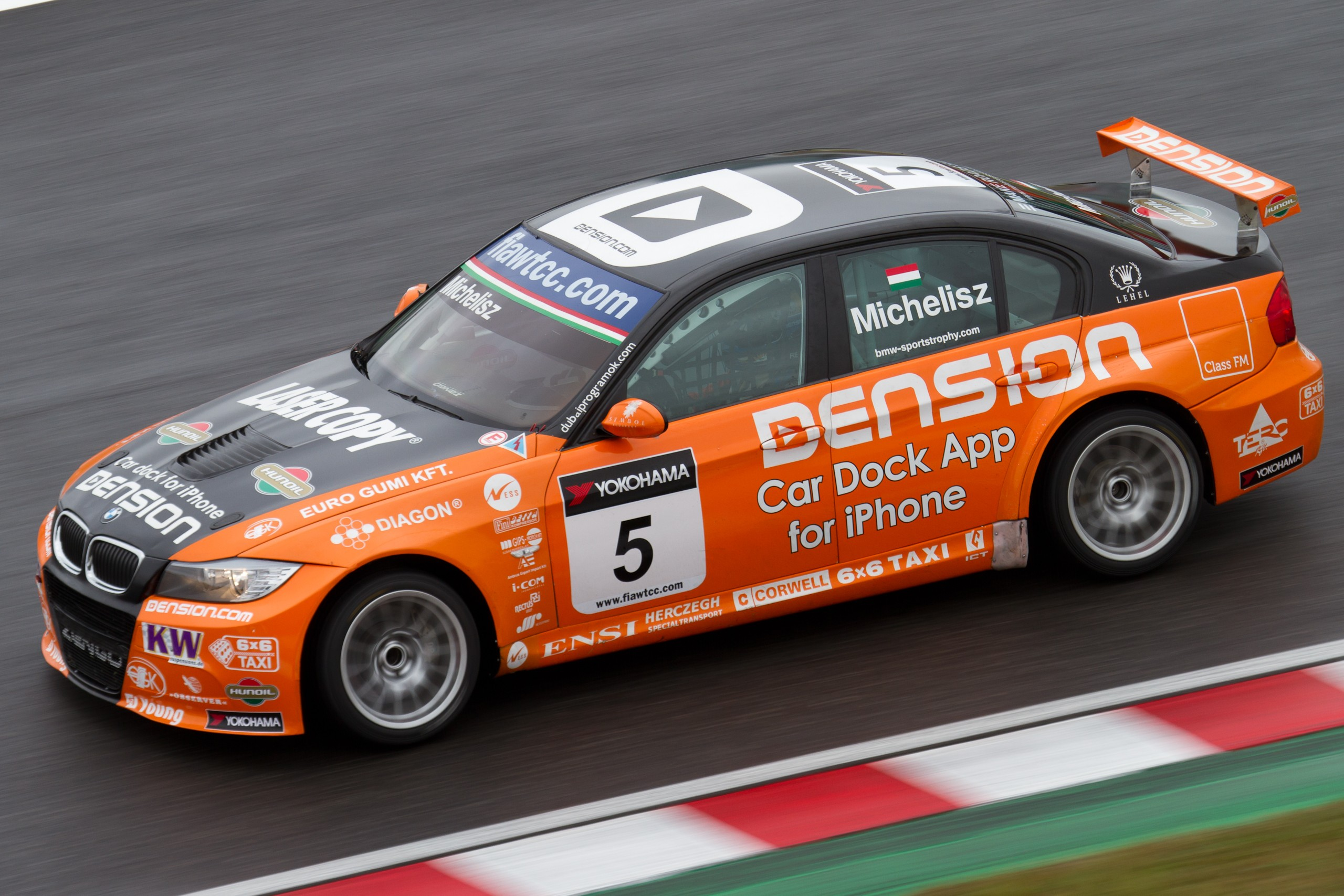
BMW 320 TC of Zengő

For the 2011 World Touring Car Championship season, the team switched cars to the BMW 320 TC and were eligible for the Yokohama Independent's Trophy. The team had to miss the season opening Race of Brazil as the team chose to test the new car before racing it. Michelisz lined up fourth at the Race of Italy as the fastest independent driver. He finished the first race of the weekend fourth having run third until the final lap when he demoted to fourth by Tiago Monteiro at the final corner. The team's best result came in the Race of Hungary, where Michelisz finished race one in second place. They could not repeat this in race two when Michelisz outbraked himself at the start trying to pass Kristian Poulsen, he finished fifteenth as the last classified runner. Having initially qualified fifth for the Race of the Czech Republic, Michelisz was excluded from the results after the team ran the car underweight during qualifying. After several near misses (Race of Germany, Race of Spain), Michelisz finished the season 9th in the overall points standings and 4th in the Yokohama Driver's Trophy. The team ended the season fourth in the Yokohama Teams' Trophy.

The team entered two BMW 320 TCs at the start of the 2012 season with Gábor Wéber joining Michelisz in the team. Previous title sponsor Dension pulled out of the WTCC, so the team changed their name back to Zengő Motorsport. Michelisz started on pole position for the second race at the Race of Italy and led until lap seven when he struck a pigeon on the track. After this, he started to drop down the order and finished eighth. Financial concerns meaning Wéber missed the Race of Morocco, reducing the team to running a single car for the event. Wéber returned at the Race of Slovakia, where Michelisz took both his and the team's first pole position in the WTCC, starting on the front row for race one alongside Aleksei Dudukalo. He finished sixth after making contact with Dudukalo's teammate Gabriele Tarquini at the start of the race. Zengő Motorsport and Michelisz took the race two victory at the Race of Hungary in front of their home crowd. The team was again reduced to a single car for the Race of Brazil as Wéber dropped out due to lack of a sponsorship. The Race of Brazil saw Michelisz move into the lead of the Yokohama Drivers' Trophy ahead of Pepe Oriola. A pair of podium finishes at the Race of the United States were to be the last overall championship points of the season for the team. Michelisz failed to score in the opening race of the Race of Japan and then spun out of the second race. Michelisz was given a drive through penalty for causing a second corner collision at the Race of China and finished fifteenth. Despite not finishing either race at the Race of Macau, Michelisz won the WTCC Yokohama Independent Drivers' Trophy. Zengő Motorsport finished fifth in the Yokohama Teams' Trophy, one place down on the previous season.

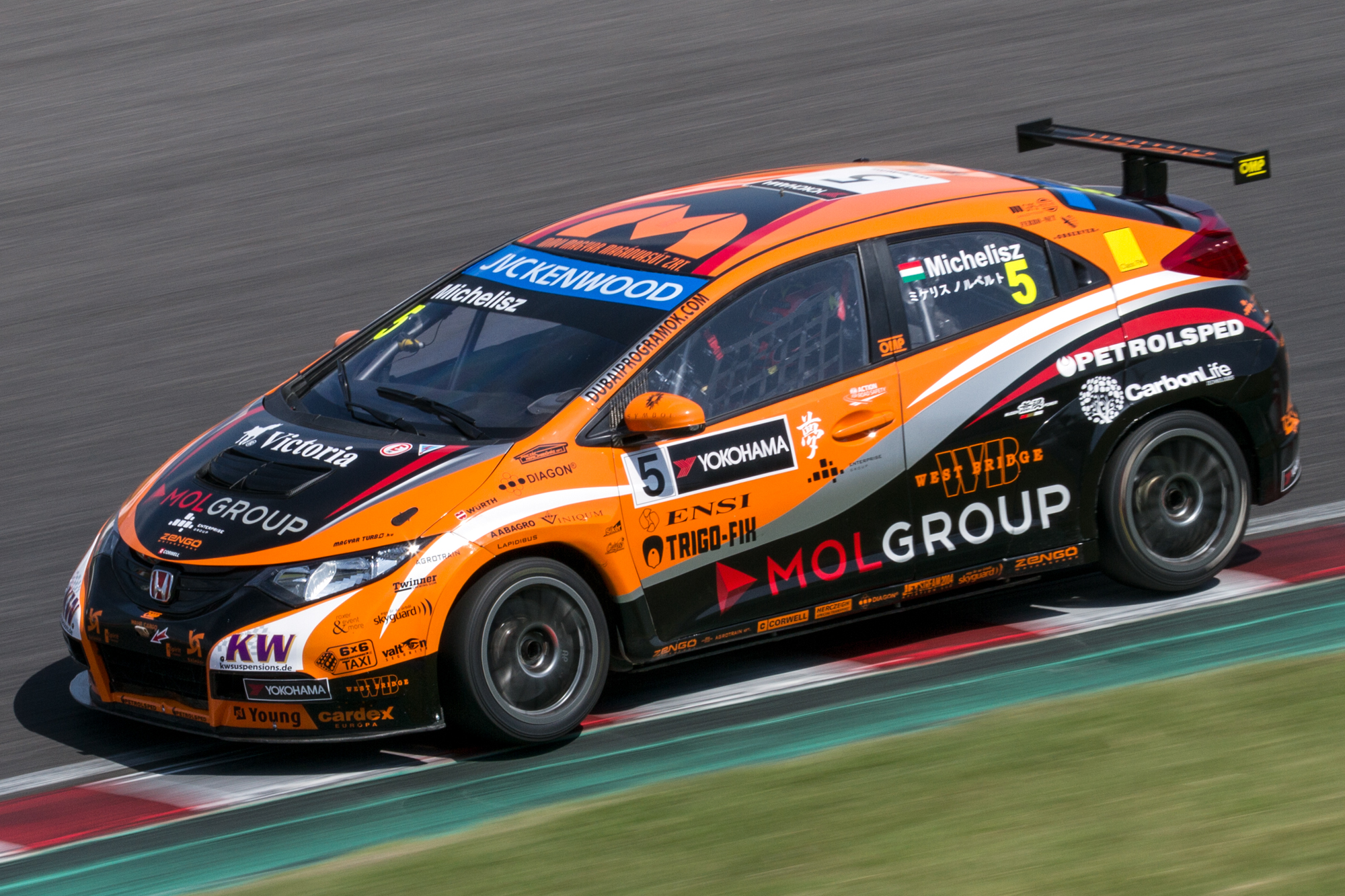
Norbert Michelisz at the 2013 Race of Japan, which he won

=== Honda Civic (2013–2017) ===
Zengő Motorsport stayed in the World Touring Car Championship in 2013, now running a Honda Civic 1.6T built by the works JAS Motorsport team. Norbert Michelisz stayed on as the team's sole driver.

In 2016 they added a 2nd car, and swapped out Michelisz for Ferenc Ficza and Dániel Nagy.

And in 2017 Ficza was dropped as a driver, Aurélien Panis drove rounds 1–5 with Zsolt Szabó replacing him for rounds 6–10.

== European Touring Car Cup ==
Zengő Motosport entered the European Touring Car Cup in 2013 with a pair of SEAT León Supercopas in the single–makes trophy for Ferenc Ficza and Norbert Nagy. The new Zengő Junior Team will be run jointly with MNASZ Track Racing.

== World Touring Car Cup (2018-2022) ==
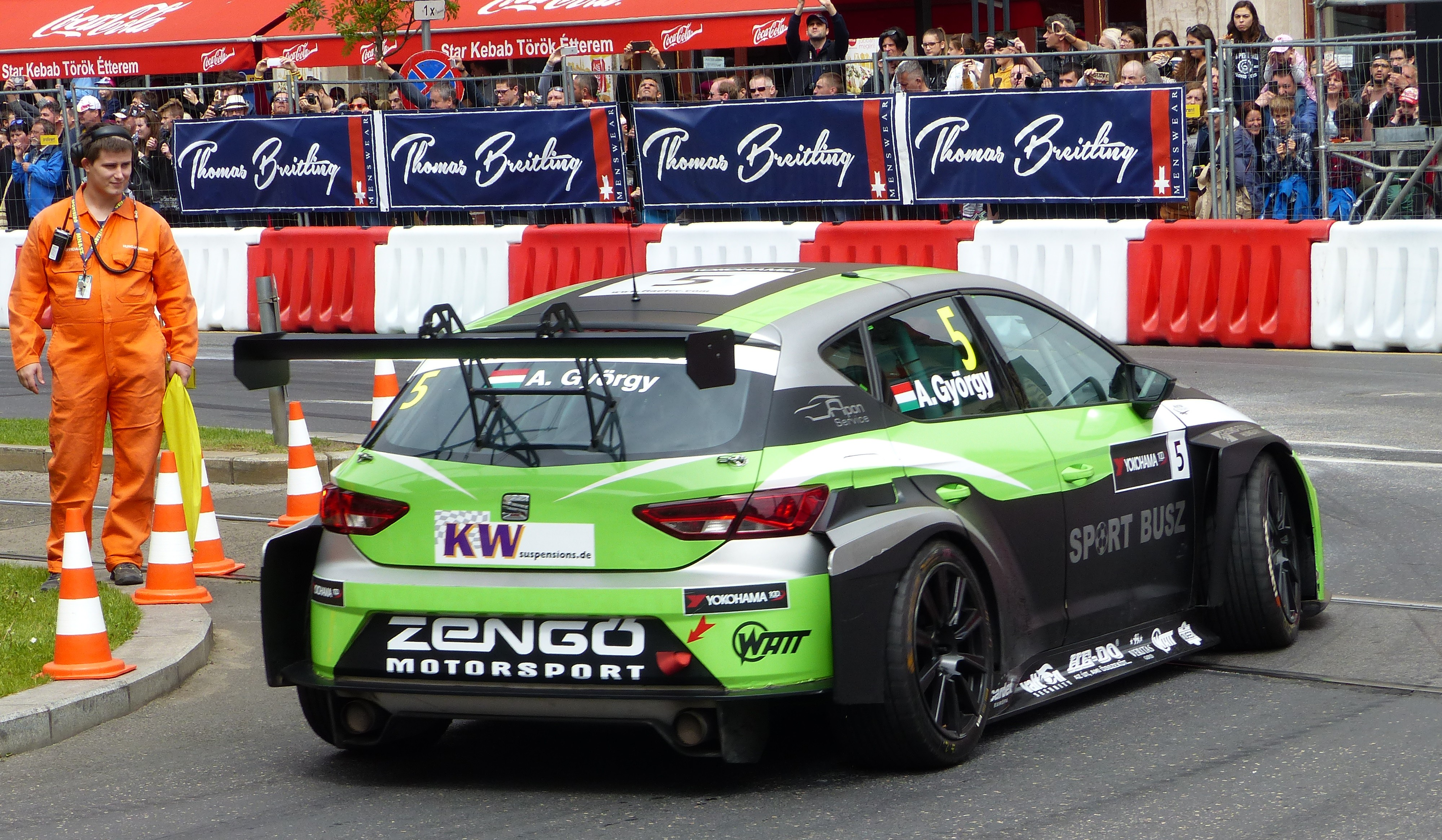
SEAT León TCR of Zengő

Zengő Motosport entered the inaugural season of the World Touring Car Cup (WTCR) in 2018 with a pair of CUPRA León TCR's.

In 2019 they were only a Wild Card entry and as such ineligible to score points.

In 2020 they were back as a full team now with 3 drivers and an upgraded car in the CUPRA León Competición TCR

In 2021 they created a 2nd junior team Zengő Motorsport Drivers’ Academy alongside the main team Zengő Motorsport Services KFT, each team had 2 drivers/cars.

In 2022 they were back to just 1 main 2 driver team.

== Formula 4 CEZ Championship (2025-) ==
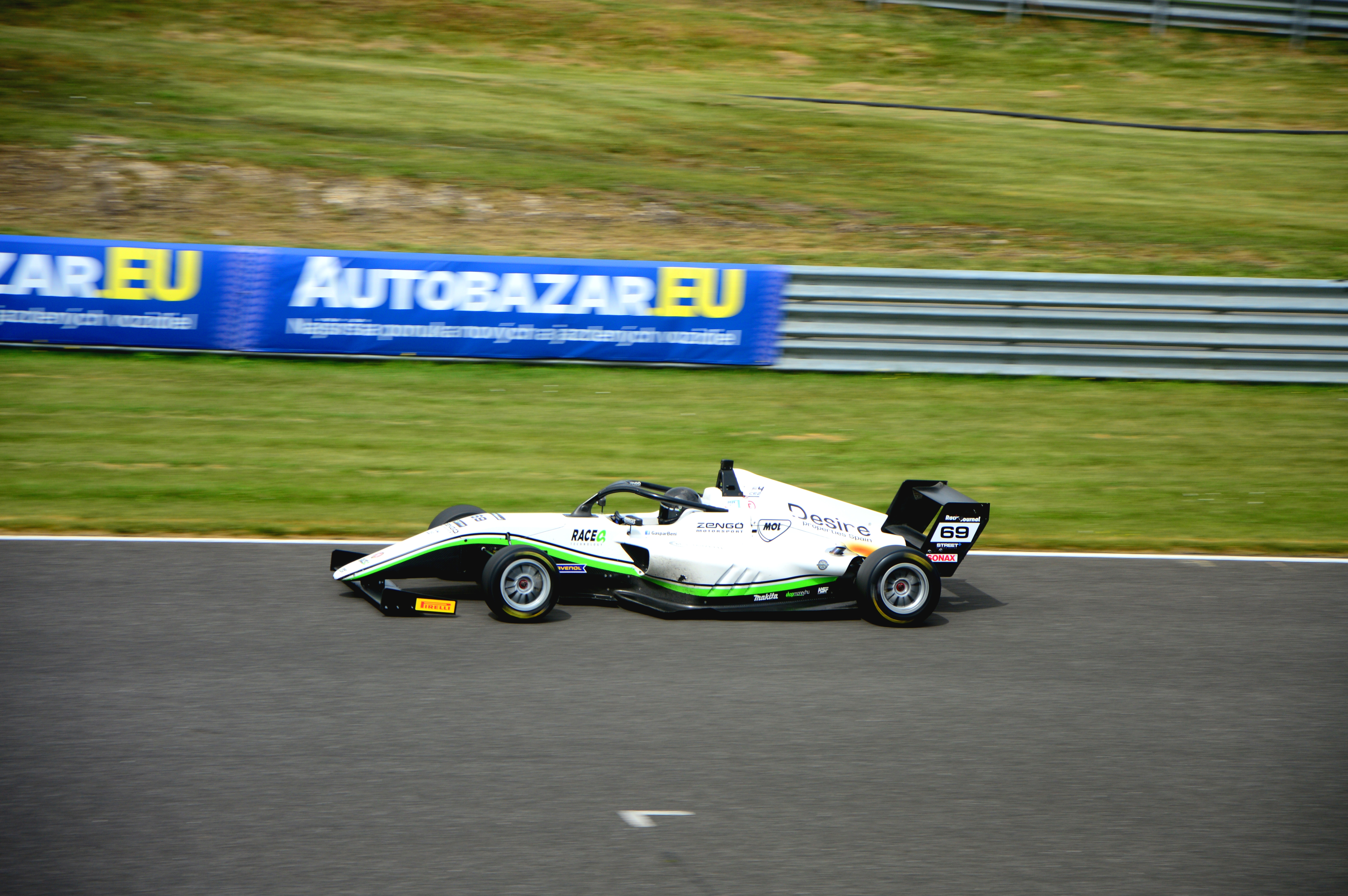
Tatuus F4-T421 of Zengő Motosport at the Slovakia Ring in 2025

Zengő Motosport entered the 2025 season of the Formula 4 CEZ Championship with Benett Gáspár as their sole entry for the season.

== Results ==
=== World Touring Car Championship ===
Year	Car	Drivers	Races	Wins	Poles	F.L.	Points	D.C.	Y.T.
2010	SEAT León 2.0 TDI	(Hungary) Norbert Michelisz	22	1	0	0	104	9th	–
2011	BMW 320 TC	(Hungary) Norbert Michelisz	22	0	0	2	88	9th	4th
2012	BMW 320 TC	(Hungary) Norbert Michelisz	24	1	1	2	155	6th	5th
2012	BMW 320 TC	(Hungary) Gábor Wéber	12	0	0	0	3	23rd	5th
2013	Honda Civic WTCC	(Hungary) Norbert Michelisz	24	1	2	2	185	6th	4th
2014	Honda Civic WTCC	(Hungary) Norbert Michelisz	24	0	0	0	201	4th	2nd
2015	Honda Civic WTCC	(Hungary) Norbert Michelisz	24	1	1	0	193	6th	3rd
2016	Honda Civic WTCC	(Hungary) Ferenc Ficza	17	0	0	1	2	20th	5th
2016	Honda Civic WTCC	(Hungary) Dániel Nagy	10	0	0	0	0	NC	5th
2017	Honda Civic WTCC	(France) Aurélien Panis	10	0	0	0	2	18th	6th
2017	Honda Civic WTCC	(Hungary) Zsolt Szabó	10	0	0	0	1	20th	6th
2017	Honda Civic WTCC	(Hungary) Dániel Nagy	20	0	0	1	1	19th	6th

=== World Touring Car Cup ===
Year	Car	Drivers	Races	Wins	Poles	F.L.	Points	D.C.	T.C.
2018	CUPRA León TCR	(Hungary) Norbert Nagy	30	0	0	0	18	25th	12th
2018	CUPRA León TCR	(Hungary) Zsolt Szabó	26	0	0	0	4	31st	12th
2019	CUPRA León TCR	(Hungary) Tamás Tenke	3	0	0	0	0	NC	NC
2020	CUPRA León Competición TCR	(Hungary) Bence Boldizs	15	0	0	1	35	18th	5th
2020	CUPRA León Competición TCR	(Spain) Mikel Azcona	16	1	0	1	168	7th	5th
2020	CUPRA León Competición TCR	(Hungary) Gábor Kismarty-Lechner	16	0	0	0	17	20th	5th
2021	CUPRA León Competición TCR	(United Kingdom) Robert Huff	16	1	1	2	73	18th	7th
2021	CUPRA León Competición TCR	(Spain) Mikel Azcona	16	1	1	2	158	7th	7th
2021	CUPRA León Competición TCR	(Spain) Jordi Gené	14	0	0	0	10	19th	10th
2021	CUPRA León Competición TCR	(Hungary) Bence Boldizs	16	0	0	0	9	20th	10th
2022	CUPRA León Competición TCR	(United Kingdom) Robert Huff	14	2	0	4	210	6th	5th
2022	CUPRA León Competición TCR	(Hungary) Dániel Nagy	14	0	0	0	62	16th	5th
2022	CUPRA León Competición TCR	(Hungary) Bence Boldizs	2	0	0	0	12	19th	5th

=== Pure ETCR Championship ===
Year	Car	Drivers	Races	Wins	Points	D.C.	T.C.
2021	Cupra e-Racer	(Sweden) Mattias Ekström	5	1	320	1st	1st
2021	Cupra e-Racer	(Spain) Jordi Gené	5	0	260	4th	1st
2021	Cupra e-Racer	(Spain) Mikel Azcona	5	2	300	3rd	1st
2021	Cupra e-Racer	(Hungary) Dániel Nagy	5	0	178	8th	1st

=== Formula 4 CEZ Championship ===
Year	Car	Drivers	Races	Wins	Poles	F.L.	Points	D.C.	T.C.
2025	Tatuus F4-T421	(Hungary) Benett Gáspár	18	0	0	0	57	11th	5th
2026	Tatuus F4-T421	(Hungary) Benett Gáspár							

* Season still in progress.

=== E4 Championship ===
Year	Car	Drivers	Races	Wins	Poles	F.L.	Points	D.C.	T.C.
2025	Tatuus F4-T421	(Hungary) Benett Gáspár	3	0	0	0	10	18th	13th

=== Italian F4 Championship ===
Year	Car	Drivers	Races	Wins	Poles	F.L.	Points	D.C.	T.C.
2026	Tatuus F4-T421	(Hungary) Benett Gáspár							
