= Hyundai Veloster =

South Korean compact car

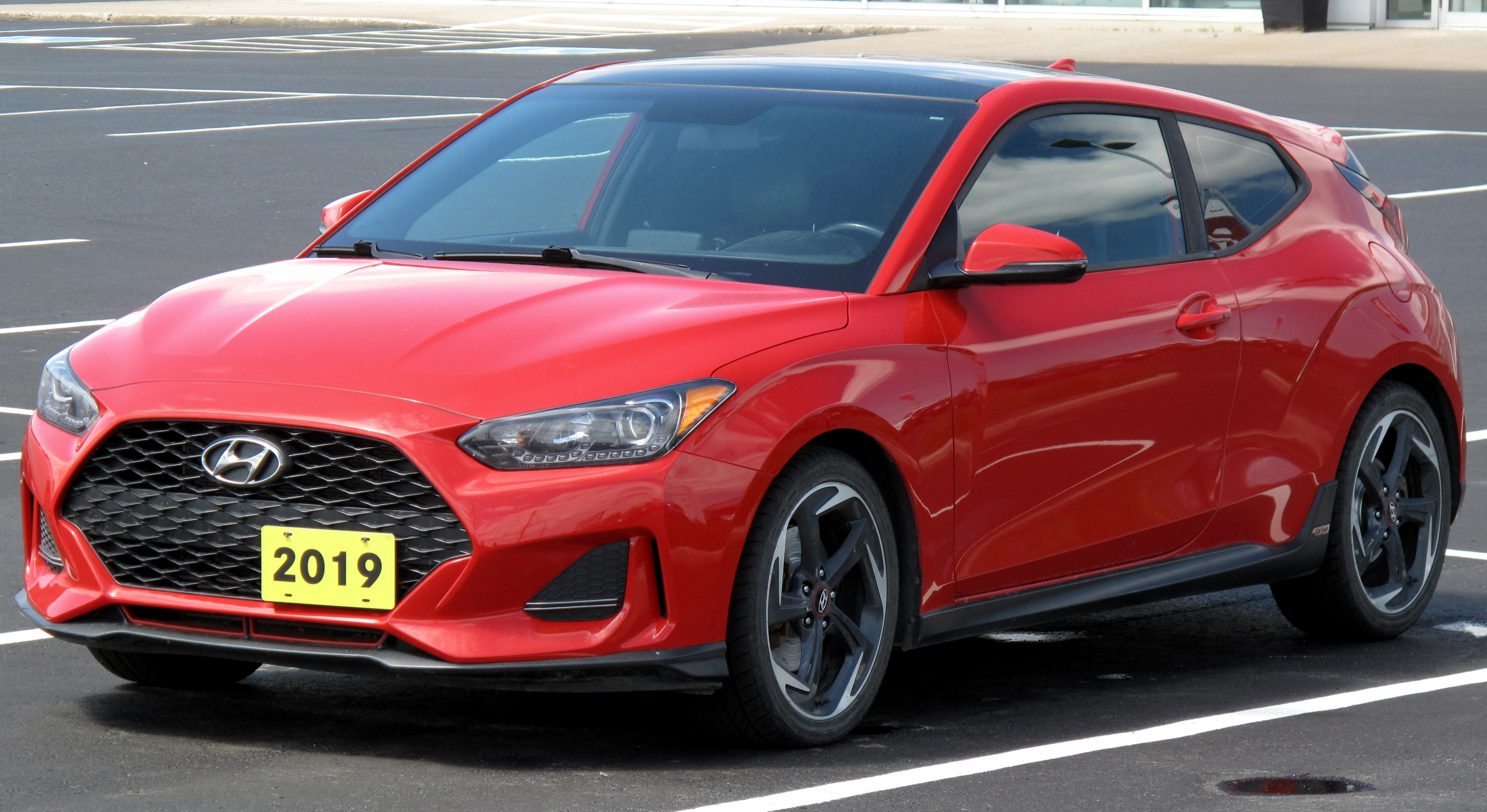

Overview
- Manufacturer: Hyundai
- Production: 2011–2022
- Model years: 2012–2022
- Assembly: South Korea: Ulsan (Ulsan Plant 1)

Body and chassis
- Class: Sport compact car
- Body style: 3+1-door hatchback
- Layout: Front-engine, front-wheel-drive

Chronology
- Predecessor: Hyundai Tiburon/Coupé/Tuscani
- Successor: Hyundai Ioniq 3

The Hyundai Veloster (Korean: 현대 벨로스터, romanized: Hyeondae Belloseuteo) is a compact car which was produced by Hyundai from 2011 until 2022. The car differs from most other hatchbacks with its asymmetrical door configuration, featuring one large door on the driver side and two smaller doors on the passenger side. This configuration is more common on commercial vehicles and minivans.

== Development and early concepts ==
=== HND-3 concept (2007) ===
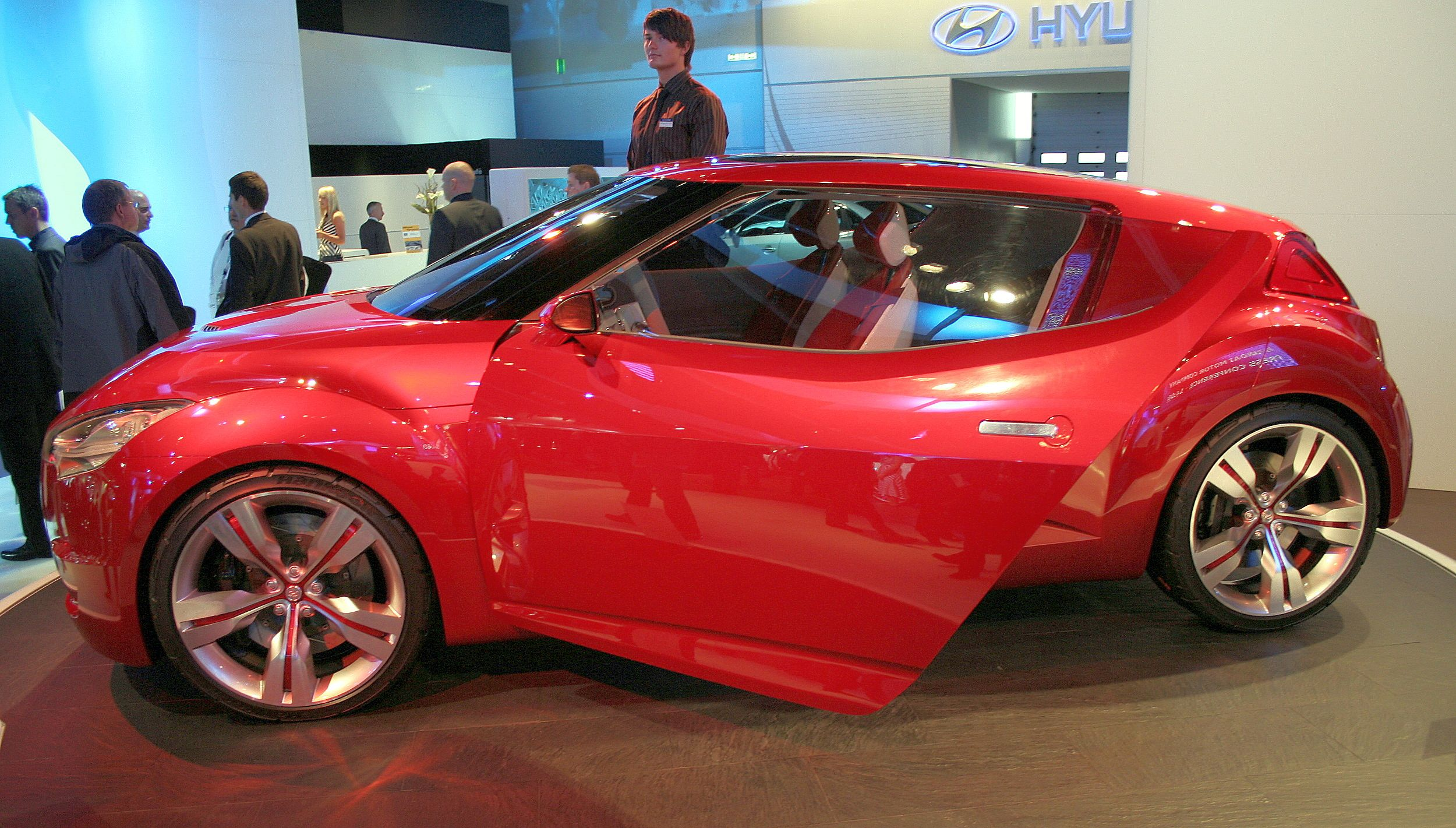
Hyundai HND-3 concept

The Hyundai HND-3 concept was the third sport compact concept car styled at Hyundai's Design and Technical Center. It featured a 2.0-liter DOHC Theta inline four-cylinder engine and five-speed automatic transmission.

The concept was unveiled at the 2007 Seoul Motor Show, and evolved into the Veloster, with the final production version released on January 11 at the Detroit Auto Show. The Veloster is developed under the codename FS, and is built on a modified version of the Cee'd's front-wheel drive platform.

== First generation (FS; 2011) ==
First generation
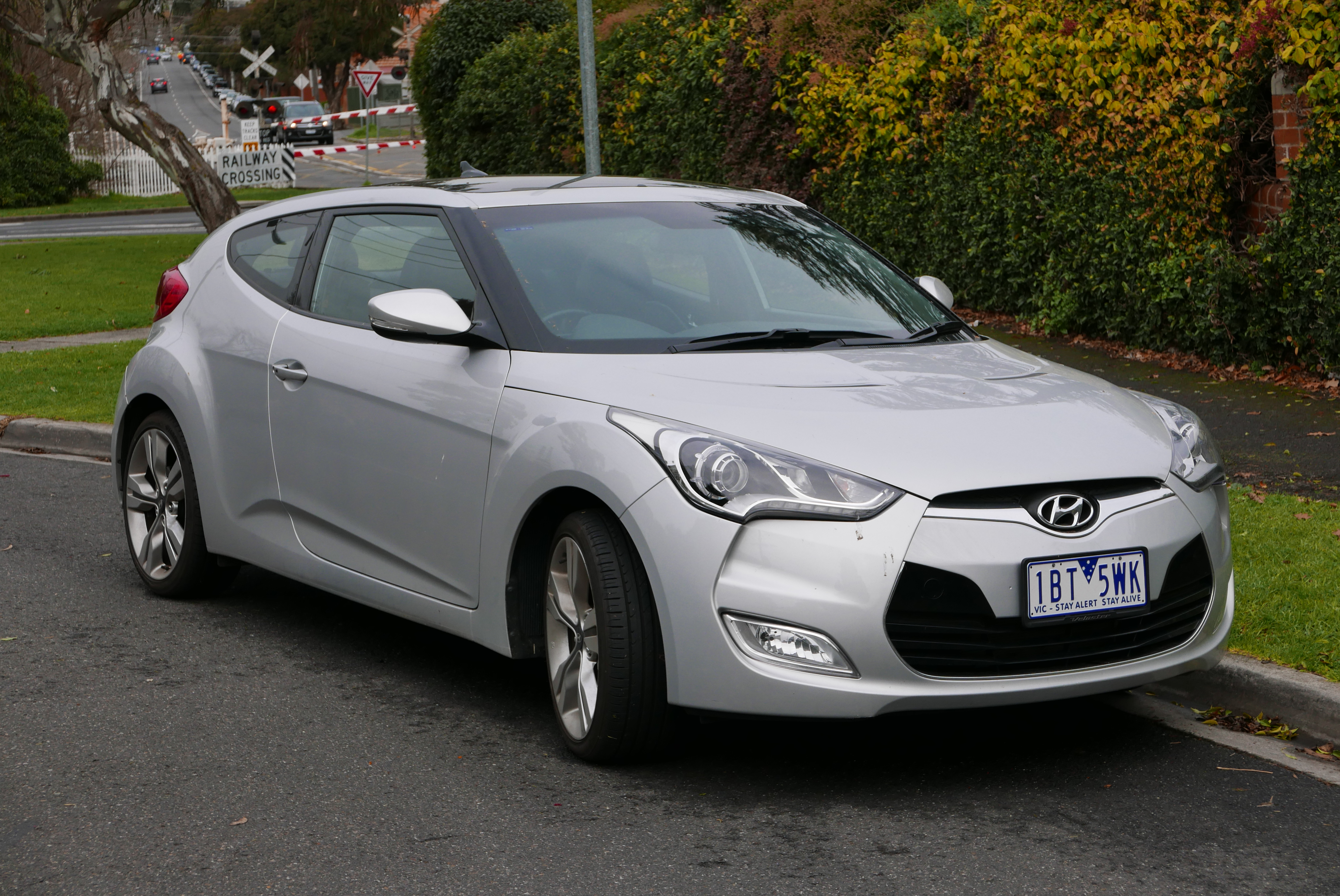

Overview
- Model code: FS
- Production: 2011–2018
- Model years: 2012–2017

Body and chassis
- Platform: Hyundai-Kia PB

Powertrain
- Engine: Gasoline: 1.6 L Gamma MPi I4; 1.6 L Gamma GDI I4; 1.6 L Gamma II Turbo GDI I4
- Transmission: 6-speed manual; 6-speed automatic; 6-speed D6GF1 DCT; 7-speed D7UF1 DCT

Dimensions
- Wheelbase: 2,650 mm (104.3 in)
- Length: 4,220 mm (166.1 in); 4,250 mm (167.3 in) (Turbo)
- Width: 1,790 mm (70.5 in); 1,805 mm (71.1 in) (Turbo)
- Height: 1,400 mm (55.1 in)
- Curb weight: 1,100–1,250 kg (2,425–2,756 lb) (1.6); 1,200–1,400 kg (2,646–3,086 lb) (1.6T)

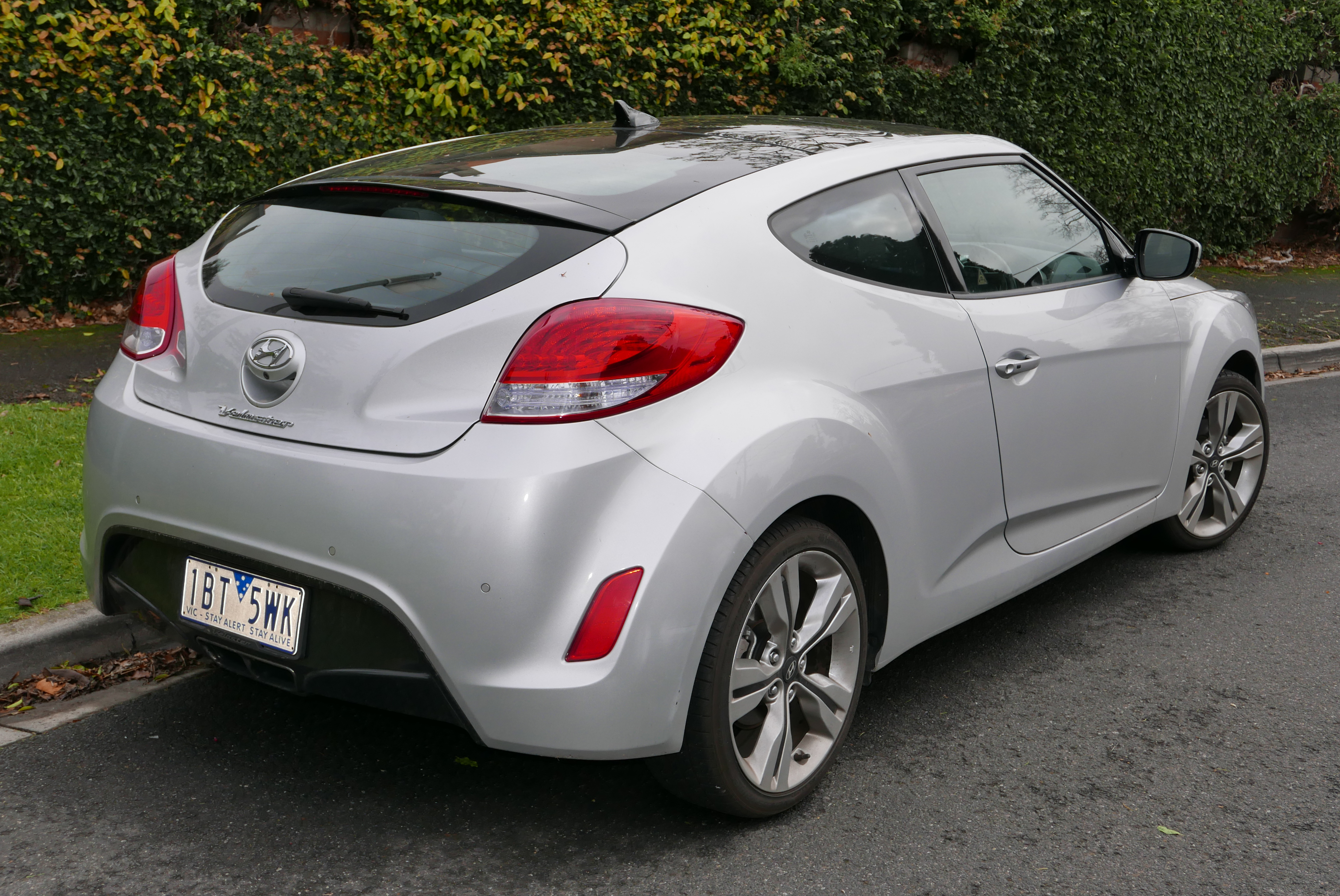
2013 Hyundai Veloster hatchback

In most of the world the Veloster production model uses a direct-injected 1.6 liter four-cylinder engine with 138 hp (103 kW), and 123 lb⋅ft (167 N⋅m) of torque at 4,850 rpm. A six-speed manual transmission is standard while a seven-speed dual-clutch transmission (DCT) with paddle shifters is available as an option. The DCT transmission was developed by Hyundai and is the first dual-clutch transmission from the company. Official EPA fuel economy numbers are 27 mpg_{‑US} (8.7 L/100 km; 32 mpg_{‑imp}) city, 37 mpg_{‑US} (6.4 L/100 km; 44 mpg_{‑imp}) highway and 31 mpg_{‑US} (7.6 L/100 km; 37 mpg_{‑imp}) combined for the manual while the dual clutch does 28 mpg_{‑US} (8.4 L/100 km; 34 mpg_{‑imp}) city, 37 mpg_{‑US} (6.4 L/100 km; 44 mpg_{‑imp}) highway and 31 mpg_{‑US} (7.6 L/100 km; 37 mpg_{‑imp}) combined. For some markets like the Middle East, Chile and Brazil, the car is offered without GDI, making 128 hp.

Sales began in South Korea on March 10, 2011, and in Canada and the United States in late 2011. (Note: Despite government certification and an aborted product introduction, the Veloster has not been marketed in Mexico; however, a "handful" of Velosters brought to that country for certification were subsequently sold there.) In South Korea, it was marketed under Hyundai's 'Premium Youth Lab'. It was unveiled on January 10, 2011, at the Detroit Auto Show, and fills the void left when Hyundai discontinued the Hyundai Tiburon after the 2008 model year.

In North America, the Veloster was equipped with Blue Link, a new telematics system which will eventually be standard on all Hyundai models. The system is comparable to OnStar in General Motors vehicles, and provides customers with automatic crash notification, vehicle diagnostics, and remote control of vehicle features, among others. Each trim level is available with the DCT (optional) or manual transmission (standard).

A Michelin Pilot Super Sport 215/40ZR18 tires option was added to U.S. vehicle models with 18-inch wheels since 2012.

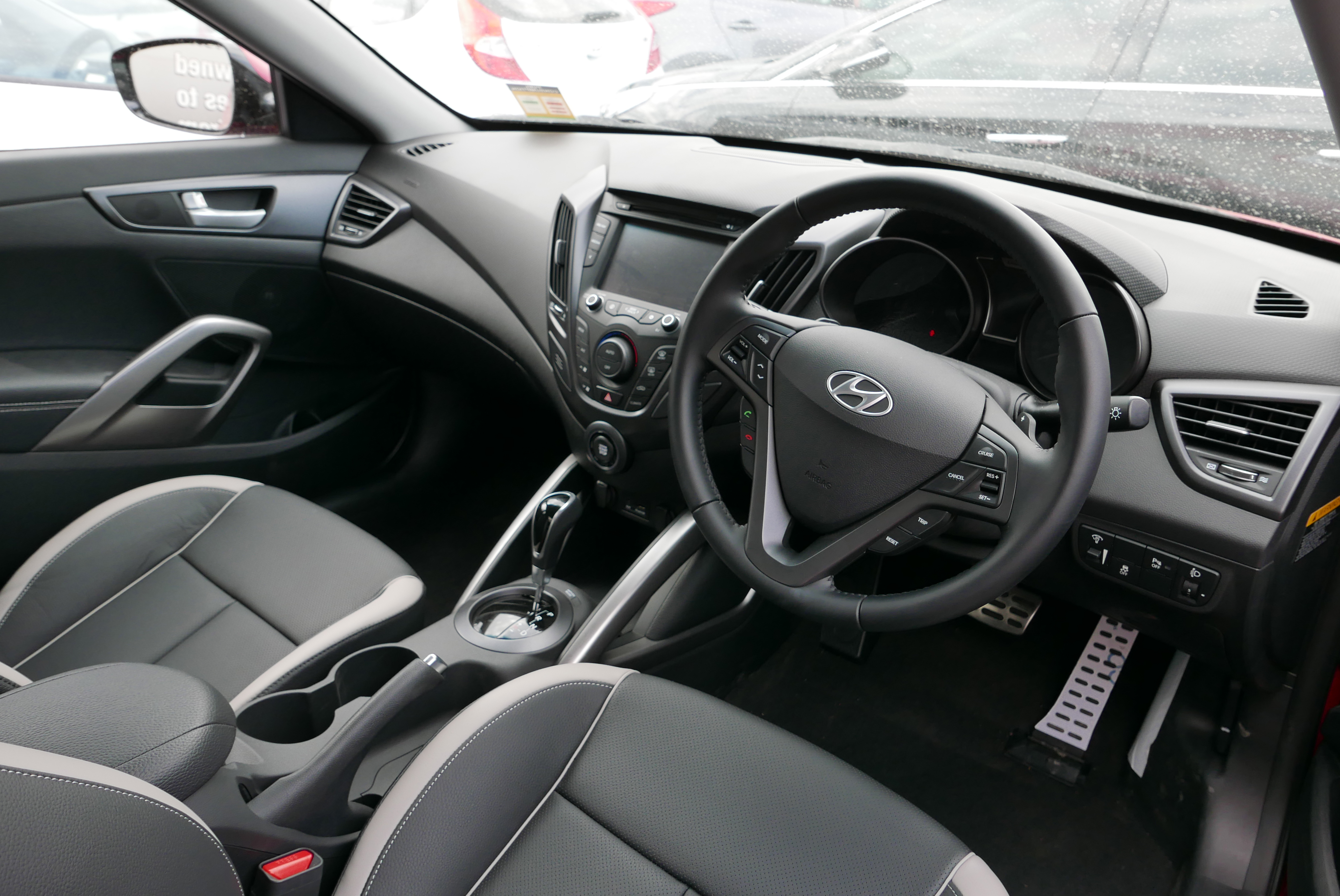
Interior

European models do not have the option of tech or style packs and are instead split between two trim levels: Veloster Coupe and Veloster Coupe Sport. The sport model adds a panoramic sunroof, 18 inch wheels and full leather interior to the base model car. Cars for the European market come as standard with a 6-speed manual transmission and have the option of a DCT automatic gearbox. The range in Europe also includes a "BlueDrive" option, which adds low rolling resistance tires and stop-start technology to the engine in order to reduce emissions, but only on the entry-level car.

Unlike the Mini Clubman, which features a pair of bi-parting side doors that are always located on the right of the car (irrespective of the market), the Veloster has different left and right hand drive configurations. The larger single door is always on the driver's side, and the two smaller doors are always on the passenger side. As a result, the rear passenger always exits on the curb side of the vehicle.

=== Veloster Turbo ===
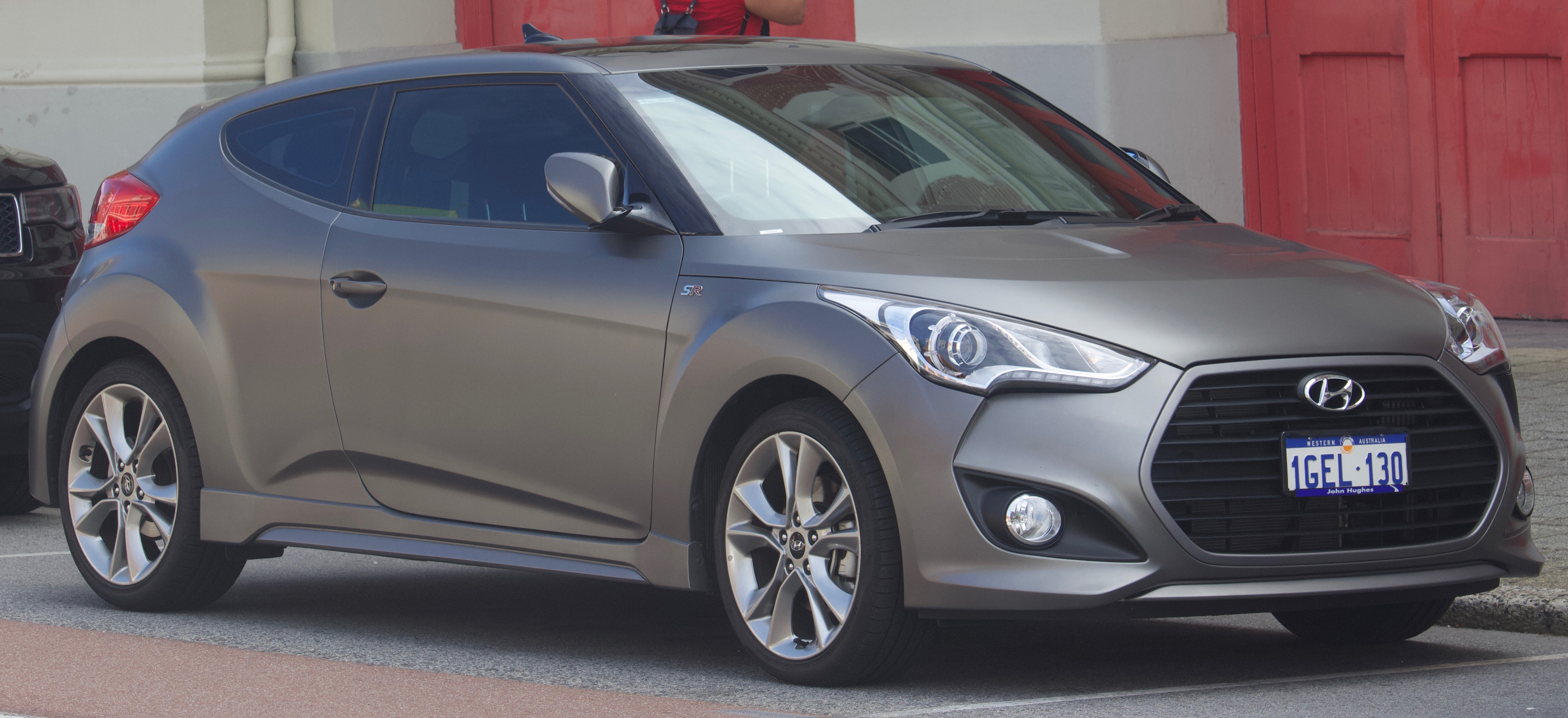

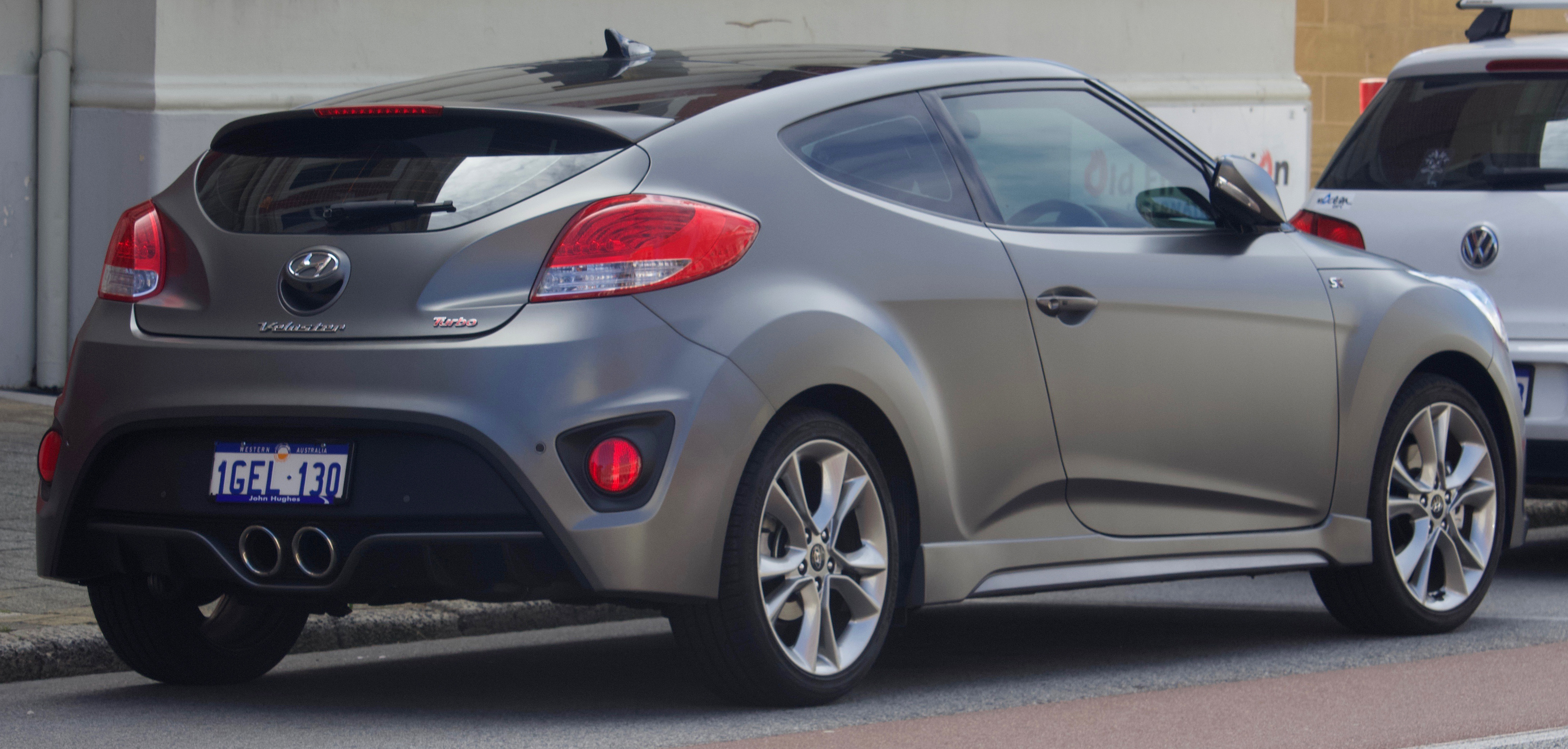
Hyundai Veloster SR Turbo

The Veloster Turbo uses a 1.6L T-GDi Gamma engine that has different outputs depending on the market. In North America, the engine outputs 150 kW (204 PS; 201 hp) at 6,000 rpm, and 27 kg⋅m (265 N⋅m; 195 lbf⋅ft) between 1,750 and 4,500 rpm. In other markets, such as Europe, it received a lower-power engine outputting 186 PS (137 kW; 183 hp) at 5,500 rpm with the same 265 Nm of torque, but altered to come earlier in the rev range at 1500 rpm. The car has three doors making the Veloster Turbo's shooting brake body style both in North America and in Europe a relative novelty.

The Turbo further receives new body panels which add LED lights, large twin exhausts, side skirts, a larger front grille to accommodate intercooling, turbo badging and extra equipment as standard, including push button start (satnav and back-up camera available on top trim level). The matte grey paint option is also available on the Turbo.

The Veloster Turbo was unveiled at the 2012 North American International Auto Show. The model shown was a concept vehicle with a special graphics package featuring a gray and yellow stripe running the length of the car, yellow trim on the front spoiler, side skirts and rear fascia, as well as a checkered flag theme on the side and roof spoiler and was also unveiled at the 2012 Chicago Auto Show.

The North American model went on sale in summer 2012 as a 2013 model year vehicle, with the choice of either a six-speed manual transmission or a six-speed automatic transmission with Shiftronic. The European version is only available with manual transmission.

The Veloster skipped production for 2017, as Hyundai prepared a new model for 2019 release.

==== Veloster RE:MIX (2012) ====
The Veloster RE:MIX is a version of the Hyundai Veloster inspired by Hyundai's RE:MIX Lab program. It features a unique body kit, gunmetal-finish alloy wheels and a premium audio system. The vehicle was unveiled at the 2012 SEMA show. U.S. models arrived at dealerships in December 2012.

==== Veloster RE:FLEX Edition (2014) ====
The Veloster RE:FLEX Edition is a limited (3000 units) version of the 2014 Hyundai Veloster 1.6 Gamma GDi with six-speed EcoShift dual-clutch transmission. It features black or red full leather seating, projector headlights with LED headlight accents, LED taillights, LED illuminated door sills, 18-inch alloy wheels with a PVD chrome finish, chrome hood accents, chrome door handles and RE:FLEX badging on the exterior and floor mats.

The vehicle was unveiled at the 2014 Chicago Auto Show. U.S. model went on sale for $21,650 excluding freight, and includes all of the Veloster DCT Style Package equipment excluding the panoramic roof.

==== Veloster Rally Edition (2016) ====
The Veloster Rally Edition is a limited (1200 Units) version of the 2016 model-year Hyundai Veloster Turbo 1.6 Gamma TCi GDi paired with a 6-speed manual transmission featuring a B&M Sport Shifter assembly.

The exterior of the vehicle features a Rally Edition-only matte blue paint color, RAYS Rally Edition wheels (5lbs lighter per wheel), carbon fiber stylized side accents and front-lip, and most noticeably a full-metal roof for weight savings rather than the standard glass panoramic sunroof of the standard Turbo model. The Rally Edition also features a matte-grey front grille sill, like its standard Turbo counterpart of the 2016 model year.

The interior of the vehicle is nearly unchanged from the standard Turbo model, with the exception of blue colored interior accents (interior door handles, center console handles, side bolsters). The Rally Edition also comes with Rally Edition floor mats.

Compared to the standard Turbo model, the Rally Edition has reduced equipment and lacks: Proximity keyless entry and start, reverse proximity sensors, side mirror indicators, automatic headlights, navigation.

In terms of performance, the Rally Edition has no difference in engine performance characteristics to its standard Turbo counterpart. The Rally Edition does feature a retuned suspension, and calibrated driver selectable power-steering (the same as the R-Spec) for stiffer steering response.

=== Concept Cars ===
==== 2011 SEMA concepts (2011) ====
The 2011 ARK Performance Veloster is a modified, rally-inspired Veloster which began as a non turbo model, and was built for the SEMA show. The engine is rated at an estimated 210 hp and features a new twin scroll turbocharger, intercooler, turbo manifold, downpipe and dual exhaust, all developed by ARK. Other modifications include an oil cooler, a lightweight pulley system, bigger 6 piston brakes, anti-roll bars, coilover suspension and new control arms. Modifications to the exterior include a green and black paint scheme, a body kit with new front lip spoiler, side skirts, rear bumper and wide-body fender kit, ARK grille, rear wing mount, custom lights and Rally Armor mudflaps.

The 2011 PM Lifestyle Veloster started out as a non turbo Veloster and was developed and modified by students at the Universal Technical Institute. It includes König wheels, a carbon-fiber hood by Seibon, a custom "Peanut Butter" leather interior, an upgraded audio system, a performance intake and exhaust, bigger brakes, a nitrous kit, coilover suspension, a Sequence-X body kit and a bright blue paint job. Power is estimated to be around 163 hp.

The Hyundai Re:Mix Music Veloster is an audio-themed car with a full DJ deck setup installed in the trunk.

The Re:Mix Gaming Veloster featured a video game theme, with an Xbox in place of the DJ booth.

The RMR Global Rallycross Veloster is a race car built by Rhys Millen Racing for 2WD Rallycross race.

==== 2012 SEMA concepts (2012) ====
The Veloster Velocity concept is a concept vehicle based on the Veloster 1.6 GDi with customized engine modifications by Cosworth (including performance pistons, rods, turbocharger, intercooler, intake manifold, intake-charging design, fuel system and engine management), custom exhaust system by CPR Fabrication, Sparco A1 WTX 5H Helmets, gloves, shoes, and seat belts; Race-Keeper Video GPS data acquisition system, Katzkin custom suede leather interior (Raven and scarlet themed suede with red stitching), CPR Integrated Roll Bar, Velocity HATCI design body kit (front and rear braking airflow ducts, lift-reducing rear diffuser, integrated front splitter, aero side skirt lip, oversized rear wing spoiler), #1 racing number design motif, HRE P40 model 19 x 9.0" lightweight satin-charcoal wheels, Brembo brakes (350x28mm two-piece rotors and 4-piston calipers), Bilstein monotube dampers and spring kit, Kumho Ecsta SPT 275/35R19 high performance summer tires.

The ARK Performance Veloster Alpine Edition is a version of the Hyundai Veloster Turbo built by ARK Performance Inc. It features custom pearl white paint by Beyond Coachworks, custom soft-touch interior materials by HEXIS, 2013 ARK/Adro body kit (bumpers, side skirts, rear wing & fenders), ARK CF rally wing, 180 Customs headlights & taillights, Seibon carbon hood & deck lid, NRG front & rear tow hook, Beyond Coachworks paint & bodywork, Yakima roof rack QLock with Fatcat 6, PM Coachworks 'Alpine Edition' interior, JPM Coachworks Alpine Edition (seats, instrument panel, shift boot/knob, armrest, headliner, visors & steering wheel), NRG short hub, NRG quick release, AIR Motion compression box, Nitto INVO 255/35/18 tires (front & rear), Kics spacers, Rays Gramlight 57Xtreme wheels (silver), Muteki lug nuts, increased engine power to 232 hp (173 kW) and 240 lb⋅ft (325 N⋅m) of torque, ARK Performance Veloster Turbo DTS exhaust system, ARK test pipe & turbo up-pipes, K&N intake system, custom tuning by BTRcc, Nitrous Express proton kit, ARK oil cooler, BTRcc custom engine bay parts, Koyo radiator, NRG oil catch tank, NRG fuel pressure tank, NRG washer mods, GP Customs engine bay, ARK big brake kit, ARK Performance DTP coilover system, Air Motion Cup suspension kit, ARK Performance upper strut bar, GP knuckles & arms.

The JP Edition Veloster is a concept vehicle based on the Hyundai Veloster and produced in association with John Pangilinan. It features a Mint Green body color, ARK performance exhaust, Lucas Oil, TS Designs metal fender flares designed by Jon Sibal, BASF Mint Green paint painted by Auto Explosion, Brembo big brake kit, KW Coilovers with ARK Performance lowering springs, Whiteline sway bars, anti-lift caster kit and end links; Rays Gram Lights Xtreme57 wheels (19 x 9.5 inches) Toyo Tires Proxes T1 Sport (265/30 R19), Recaro Cross Sportster CS seats, Takata harnesses, re-upholstery by Infinite Auto Design, Alpine Electronics System built by BP Auto Sound (MRX-F35 350 watt 4 channel amplifier, 2 MRX-M55 550 watt mono amplifiers, 2 SWS-12D4 12-inch subwoofers, SPR-60C 6.5-inch component speakers, SPR-60 6.5-inch coaxial speakers, Kinetik battery and power supply, V-LEDs lighting.

The vehicles were unveiled at the 2012 SEMA Show.

==== Veloster C3 Roll Top concept (2012) ====
The Veloster C3 Roll Top concept is a version of the Veloster 1.6 GDi, inspired by the proverb 'A rolling stone gathers no moss'. Designed by Hyundai Design North America, it included a canvas roof that opens to the rear or windshield of the vehicle, a fixed-gear bike, a flat black spoiler, glass close out and convertible top rails, black rear reflector bezels, license plate pocket and badge; upfront flat red mirror housings, black front wheels, fog lamp bezels, front grille and badging; flat teal rear wheels, red reflectors and smoked taillights, Large free flowing circular exhaust pipes, big, bold hexagonal front grille, sculpted side skirts, diffuser vents in the lower rear fascia, 18-inch wheels with chrome inserts, 8 individual headlight LED accents.

The vehicle was unveiled at the 2012 LA Auto Show.

==== Hyundai Veloster Zombie Survival Machine concept (2013) ====
The Veloster Zombie Survival Machine concept is a version of the 2013 Hyundai Veloster Turbo built by Galpin Auto Sports for The Walking Dead Chop Shop. It features a baseball bat with spikes mounted to the trunk, knife blades that pop out of the rear bumper, a double-barrel shotgun with mount, a front bumper "horde plow", a roof-mounted PA system with a "doom whistle", a slit-panel armor-plated front windshield, Vitamin C textured paint, hand-fabricated armor, storage solutions for ammo, weapons and a first-aid kit; cupholders replaced by machete holders mounted on either side of the seats.

The vehicle was unveiled at The Future US Booth at the 2013 San Diego Comic-Con.

=== Powertrain ===
Specs
Model	Years	Type/code	Transmission	Power@rpm	Torque@rpm	0–100 km/h (0–62 mph) (Official)	Top Speed
Gamma 1.6 MPi	2011–2018	1,591 cc (97.1 cu in)	6-speed manual	130 PS (96 kW; 128 hp) @ 6,300 rpm	16 kg⋅m (157 N⋅m; 116 lbf⋅ft) @ 4,850 rpm	10.7s	195 km/h (121 mph)
Gamma 1.6 MPi	2011–2018	1,591 cc (97.1 cu in)	6-speed automatic	130 PS (96 kW; 128 hp) @ 6,300 rpm	16 kg⋅m (157 N⋅m; 116 lbf⋅ft) @ 4,850 rpm	11.5s	190 km/h (118 mph)
Gamma 1.6 GDi	2011–2018	1,591 cc (97.1 cu in)	6-speed manual	140 PS (103 kW; 138 hp) @ 6,300 rpm	17 kg⋅m (167 N⋅m; 123 lbf⋅ft) @ 4,850 rpm	9.7s	201 km/h (125 mph)
Gamma 1.6 GDi	2011–2018	1,591 cc (97.1 cu in)	6-speed dual clutch	140 PS (103 kW; 138 hp) @ 6,300 rpm	17 kg⋅m (167 N⋅m; 123 lbf⋅ft) @ 4,850 rpm	10.3s	200 km/h (124 mph)
Gamma II 1.6 T-GDi	2012–2015	1,591 cc (97.1 cu in) I4 turbo	6-speed manual 6-speed automatic	186 PS (137 kW; 183 hp) @ 5,500 rpm 204 PS (150 kW; 201 hp) @ 5,500 rpm	27 kg⋅m (265 N⋅m; 195 lbf⋅ft) @ 1,500–4,500 rpm	8.4s (186PS Manual); 8.1s (186PS Automatic); 7.8s (204PS Manual); 7.4s (204PS Automatic)	214 km/h (133 mph) (186PS)
Gamma II 1.6 T-GDi	2015–2018	1,591 cc (97.1 cu in) I4 turbo	6-speed manual 7-speed dual clutch	186 PS (137 kW; 183 hp) @ 5,500 rpm 204 PS (150 kW; 201 hp) @ 5,500 rpm	27 kg⋅m (265 N⋅m; 195 lbf⋅ft) @ 1,500–4,500 rpm	8.4s (186PS Manual); 8.1s (186PS Automatic); 7.8s (204PS Manual); 7.4s (204PS Automatic)	214 km/h (133 mph) (186PS)

USA and Australian models include Veloster Gamma 1.6 GDi, Veloster Turbo 1.6 TCi GDi (204PS), while European models include the Gamma 1.6 MPi and Veloster Turbo GDi (186PS).

=== Safety ===
Euro NCAP test results for a LHD, 3-door hatchback variant on a 2011 registration:

Test	Score	Points
Overall:	5/5 stars	101
Adult occupant:	96%	35
Child occupant:	89%	43
Pedestrian:	49%	18
Safety assist:	71%	5

ANCAP test results Hyundai Veloster (2012)
Test	Score
Overall	5 /5 stars
Frontal offset	15.47/16
Side impact	16/16
Pole	2/2
Seat belt reminders	2/3
Whiplash protection	Good
Pedestrian protection	Marginal
Electronic stability control	Standard

ANCAP test results Hyundai Veloster (2013)
Test	Score
Overall	5 /5 stars
Frontal offset	15.47/16
Side impact	16/16
Pole	2/2
Seat belt reminders	2/3
Whiplash protection	Good
Pedestrian protection	Marginal
Electronic stability control	Standard

=== Recalls ===
Hyundai recalled certain model year 2012 Veloster vehicles manufactured from November 1, 2011, through April 17, 2012 and equipped with panoramic sunroofs, for possible weakened sunroof during installation at the factory. The safety recall began on January 22, 2013. In addition, model year 2012 Veloster vehicles manufactured from July 2, 2011, through February 27, 2012 and equipped with manual transmissions were recalled for binding of parking brake components caused by moisture and road grime.

=== Motorsports ===
Rhys Millen drove a Veloster rallycross car with a 2-liter engine producing 500 hp (373 kW) and 600 lb⋅ft (813 N⋅m) of torque with a 6-speed sequential transmission and all wheel drive in the Summer X Games during the 2011 US Rallycross Championship Series. The partnership between Rhys Millen Racing and Hyundai Motor America continued for the 2012 Global RallyCross Championship season. After Hyundai had announced it would no longer participate in North American motorsports, the 2011 Hyundai Veloster Global RallyCross race cars went on sale starting January 1, 2013.

=== Marketing ===
Hyundai partnered with the Rhys Millen Red Bull Rallycross team in the 2011 U.S.A Rallycross Championship. During the six planned races in 2011, the on-site activity focused on the performance-tuned production vehicles, Genesis Coupe and Veloster, and local brand managers gave attendees tours of the cars and collected attendee data via surveys on buyer interest and brand consideration. Large screens played race footage and rallycross highlights. In the pit area, which was open to all ticket holders, consumers could sit in the vehicles, pick up free merchandise and meet the drivers. The attendee area of the pit was housed in a 53-foot Featherlite spread-axle trailer that the race team operated on one side, while an on-site Hyundai activity area functioned on the other.

A TV commercial titled 'Cheetah', featuring a caged cheetah set to race a new 201 horsepower Veloster Turbo on a long stretch of open road, was premiered during the first quarter of 2012 Super Bowl.

In January 2012, Turn 10 Studios announced on the official Forza Motorsport 4 website that the 2013 Hyundai Veloster Turbo as well as Rhys Millen's Veloster Rally Car are available as a free downloadable content for the game.

In Brazil the car has been the subject of controversy as Hyundai advertised the GDi injection but only brought the MPI DUAL injection to market. Consumers who pre-ordered the car were forced to accept the non-GDi vehicle without any compensation or cancel the transaction forfeiting the 10% reservation deposit. Despite the fact that the engine is the same 128 hp (95 kW; 130 PS) as the Veloster sold in Chile, the vehicle's license specifies the car as having 138 hp (103 kW; 140 PS). Other advertised options were also not included in the vehicles sold in Brazil. This has led the Brazilian Public Ministry to start investigating Hyundai for fraudulent behavior.

As part of Hyundai Veloster Zombie Survival Machine premiere, Hyundai also developed a unique configurator app, the WalkingDeadChopShop.com, that allows fans to design a custom zombie survival machine, using the Hyundai Veloster Turbo, Santa Fe or Elantra. The submitted designs would be entered into a contest and the winning design would be constructed and unveiled in October at the New York Comic Con.

== Second generation (JS; 2018) ==
Second generation
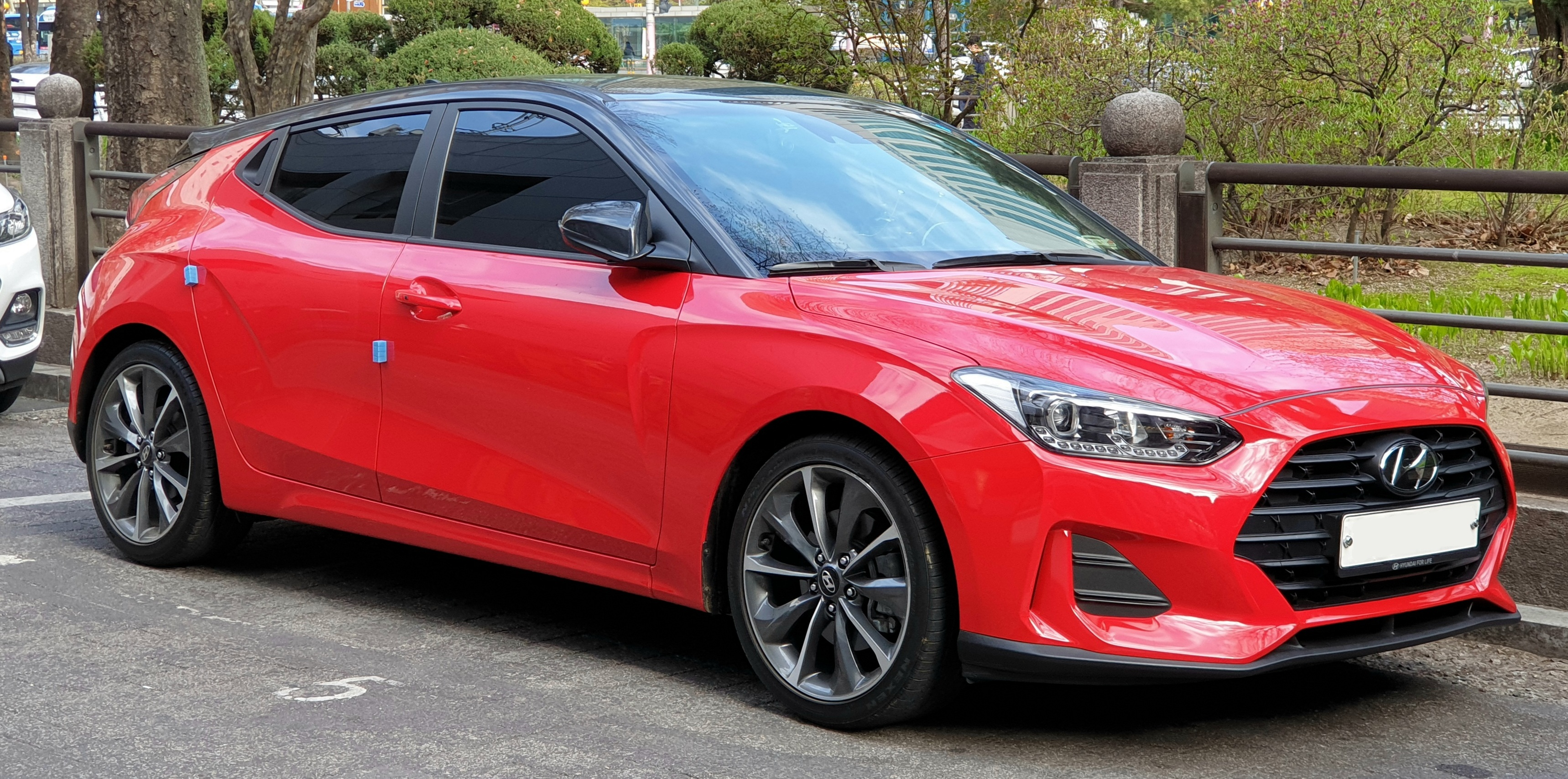
- Hyundai Veloster 1.4T JS Ignite Flame

Overview
- Model code: JS
- Production: 2018–2022
- Model years: 2019–2022

Body and chassis
- Related: Hyundai i30 (PD)

Powertrain
- Engine: Gasoline: 1.4 L Kappa II T-GDI I4; 1.6 L Gamma II T-GDI I4; 2.0 L Nu MPI I4; 2.0 L Theta II T-GDI I4
- Transmission: 6-speed M6GF2 manual; 6-speed A6GF1 automatic; 7-speed D7UF1 DCT; 8-speed D8LF1 DCT

Dimensions
- Wheelbase: 2,650 mm (104.3 in)
- Length: 4,240 mm (166.9 in); 4,265 mm (167.9 in) (N)
- Width: 1,800 mm (70.9 in); 1,810 mm (71.3 in) (N)
- Height: 1,400 mm (55.1 in); 1,395–1,400 mm (54.9–55.1 in) (N)
- Curb weight: 1,235–1,315 kg (2,723–2,899 lb) (2.0); 1,270–1,350 kg (2,800–2,976 lb) (1.4T/1.6T); 1,377–1,475 kg (3,036–3,252 lb) (N)

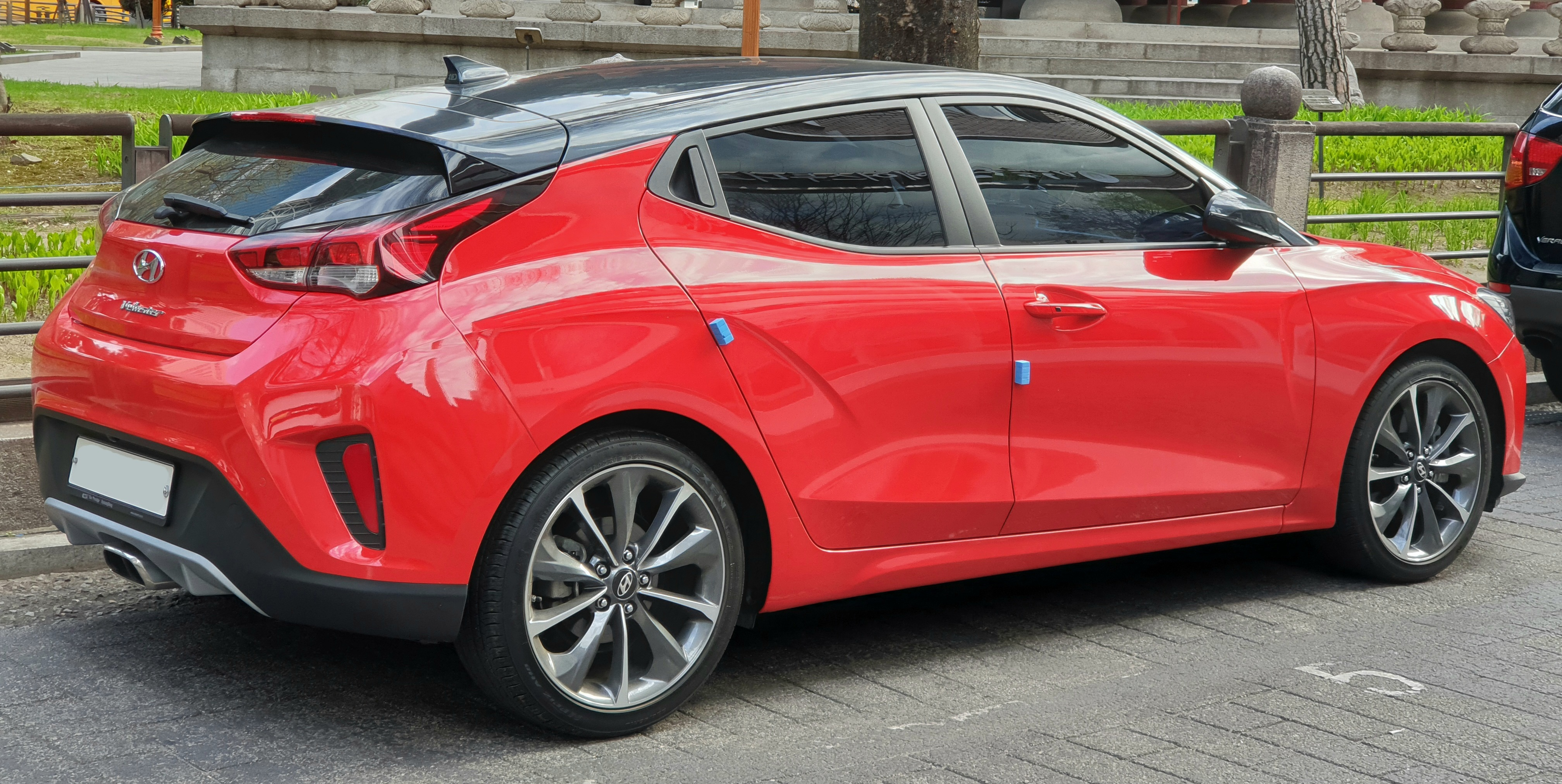
Rear

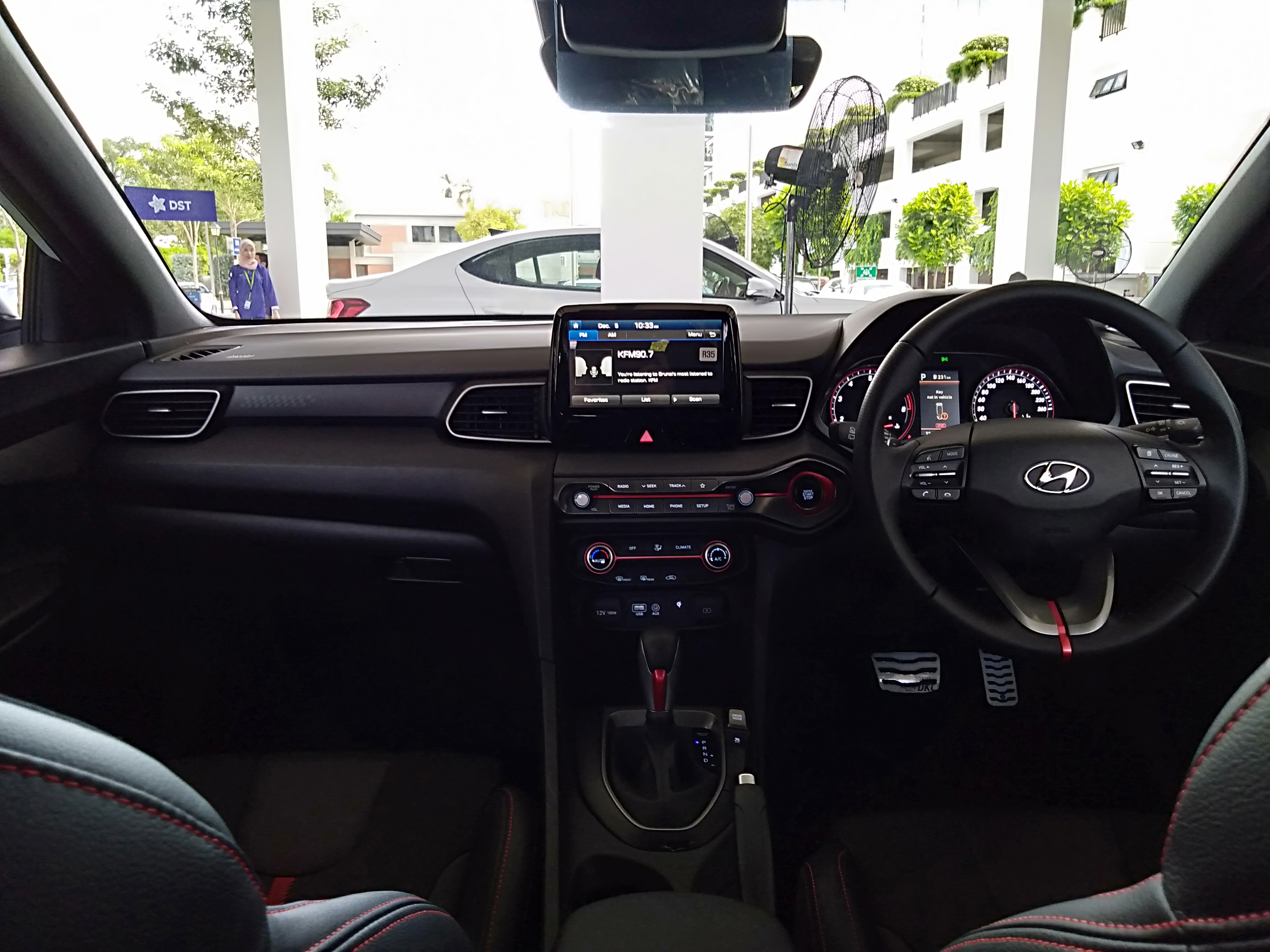
Interior

Hyundai revealed the second-generation Veloster at the 2018 North American International Auto Show. It features a brand new design from the previous generation, still retaining the asymmetrical 2+1 door configuration. It also received new safety equipment as standard on all trims, with forward-collision warning with automated emergency braking, lane-keeping assist, and a driver-attention monitor. All second-generation Velosters got multi-link suspension as standard (previously the non-turbo models from 1st-generation had a coupled torsion rear axle), and Torque Vectoring Control.

The Veloster lineup in the US originally included the base Veloster, the Veloster 2.0 Premium, the Veloster Turbo R-Spec, Veloster Turbo and the Veloster Turbo Ultimate.

The base Veloster and Veloster Premium use a new naturally-aspirated 2.0 L I4 engine that produces 147 hp (110 kW; 149 PS) and 132 lb⋅ft (179 N⋅m) of torque, more powerful than the outgoing naturally-aspirated 1.6 L engine.

=== Discontinuation ===
In August 2020, Hyundai dropped all Veloster models except the Veloster N in Canada for unspecified reasons. In July 2021, citing slow sales, Hyundai similarly announced the discontinuation of all Veloster models in the United States for 2022 except for the high performance N variant. Hyundai will focus on its more popular offerings like the Kona instead.

=== Veloster N ===
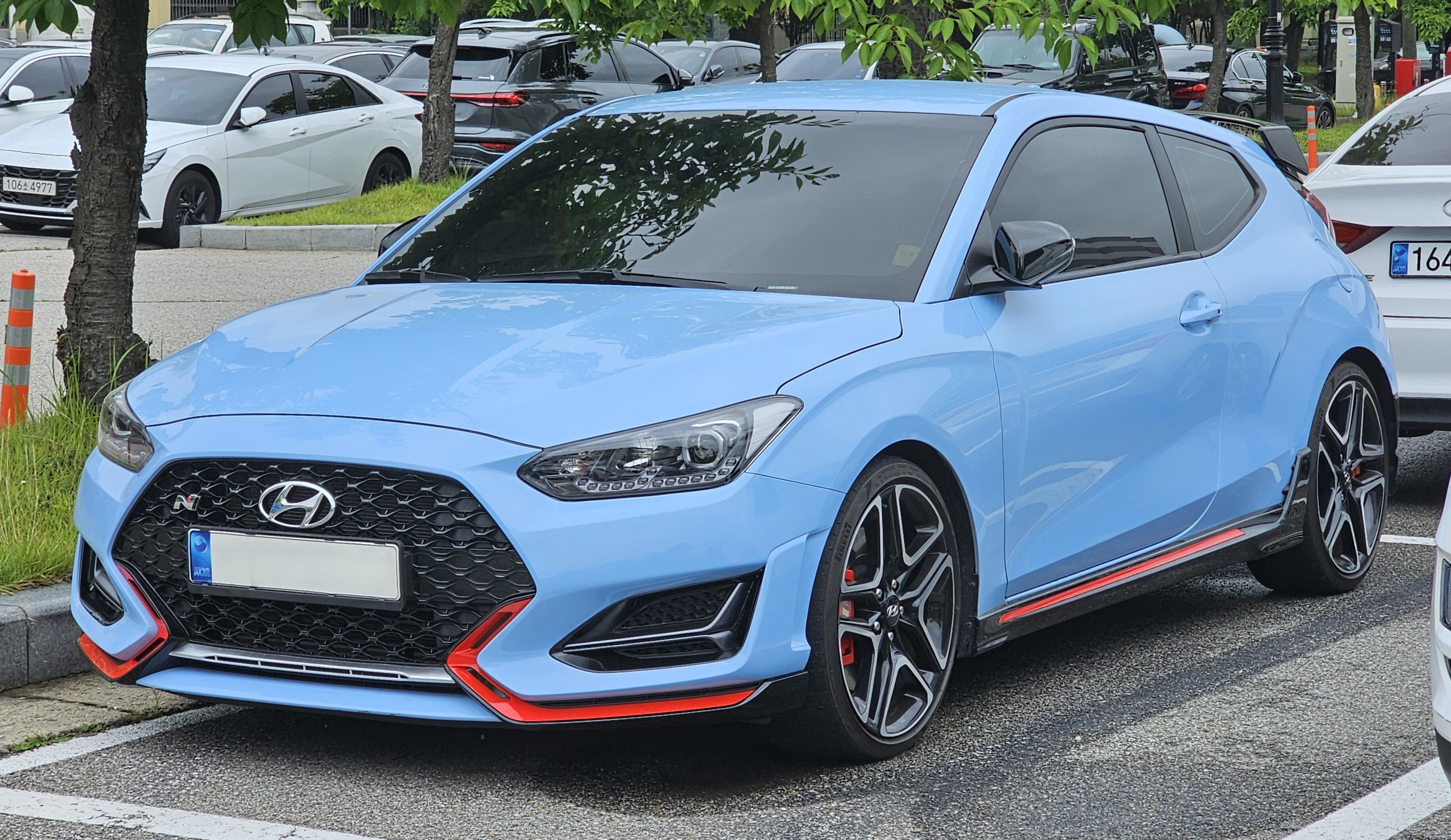

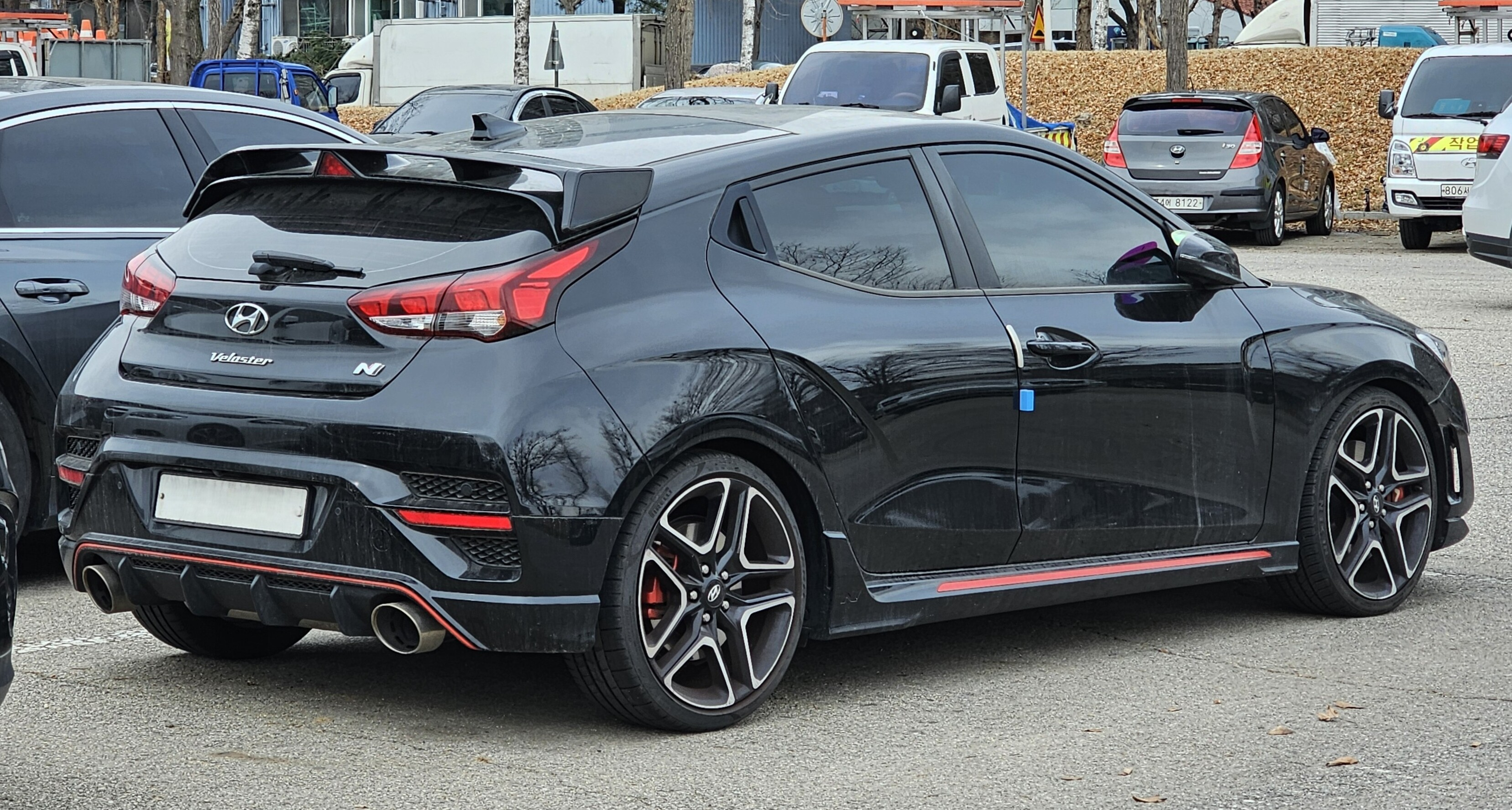
Veloster N

Released in 2019, the Veloster N was the first N model sold in North America. It is powered by a turbocharged four-cylinder engine which initially produced 250 PS (184 kW; 247 hp) as standard, with an optional Performance Package which increased power to 275 PS (202 kW; 271 hp). In 2021, the Performance Package became standard. It was also initially only offered with a 6-speed manual transmission, but an 8-speed wet dual-clutch transmission was added in 2020.

In April 2020, the Veloster N received a new 8-speed wet dual-clutch transmission, which is claimed to enable the car to accelerate from 0 to 100 km/h in 5.6 seconds.

=== Powertrain ===
Specs
Model	Years	Transmission	Power@rpm	Torque@rpm	0–100 km/h (0–62 mph) (Official)	Top Speed
Nu 2.0 MPi	2018–2020	6-speed manual	149 PS (110 kW; 147 hp) @ 6,200 rpm	18.3 kg⋅m (179 N⋅m; 132 lbf⋅ft) @ 4,500 rpm		
Nu 2.0 MPi	2018–2020	6-speed automatic	149 PS (110 kW; 147 hp) @ 6,200 rpm	18.3 kg⋅m (179 N⋅m; 132 lbf⋅ft) @ 4,500 rpm	9.6s	208 km/h (129 mph)
Kappa II 1.4 T-GDi	2018–2020	6-speed manual	140 PS (103 kW; 138 hp) @ 6,000 rpm	24.7 kg⋅m (242 N⋅m; 179 lbf⋅ft) @ 1,500–3,200 rpm	8.9s	210 km/h (130 mph)
Kappa II 1.4 T-GDi	2018–2020	7-speed DCT	140 PS (103 kW; 138 hp) @ 6,000 rpm	24.7 kg⋅m (242 N⋅m; 179 lbf⋅ft) @ 1,500–3,200 rpm	9.2s	205 km/h (127 mph)
Gamma II 1.6 T-GDi	2018–2020	6-speed manual	204 PS (150 kW; 201 hp) @ 6,000 rpm	27 kg⋅m (265 N⋅m; 195 lbf⋅ft) @ 1,500–4,500 rpm		
Gamma II 1.6 T-GDi	2018–2020	7-speed DCT	204 PS (150 kW; 201 hp) @ 6,000 rpm	27 kg⋅m (265 N⋅m; 195 lbf⋅ft) @ 1,500–4,500 rpm	7.7s	225 km/h (140 mph)
Theta 2.0 II T-GDi	2018–2022	6-speed manual	250 PS (184 kW; 247 hp) @ 6,000 rpm	36 kg⋅m (353 N⋅m; 260 lbf⋅ft) @ 1,450–4,700 rpm	6.4s	250 km/h (155 mph)
Theta 2.0 II T-GDi	2018–2022	6-speed manual	275 PS (202 kW; 271 hp) @ 6,000 rpm (Note: North American market cars claimed a slightly higher output of 275 hp (205 kW; 279 PS))	36 kg⋅m (353 N⋅m; 260 lbf⋅ft) @ 1,450–4,700 rpm	6.1s	250 km/h (155 mph)
Theta 2.0 II T-GDi	2020–2022	8-speed DCT	275 PS (202 kW; 271 hp) @ 6,000 rpm	36 kg⋅m (353 N⋅m; 260 lbf⋅ft) @ 1,450–4,700 rpm	5.6s	250 km/h (155 mph)

=== Veloster N ETCR ===
Veloster N ETCR
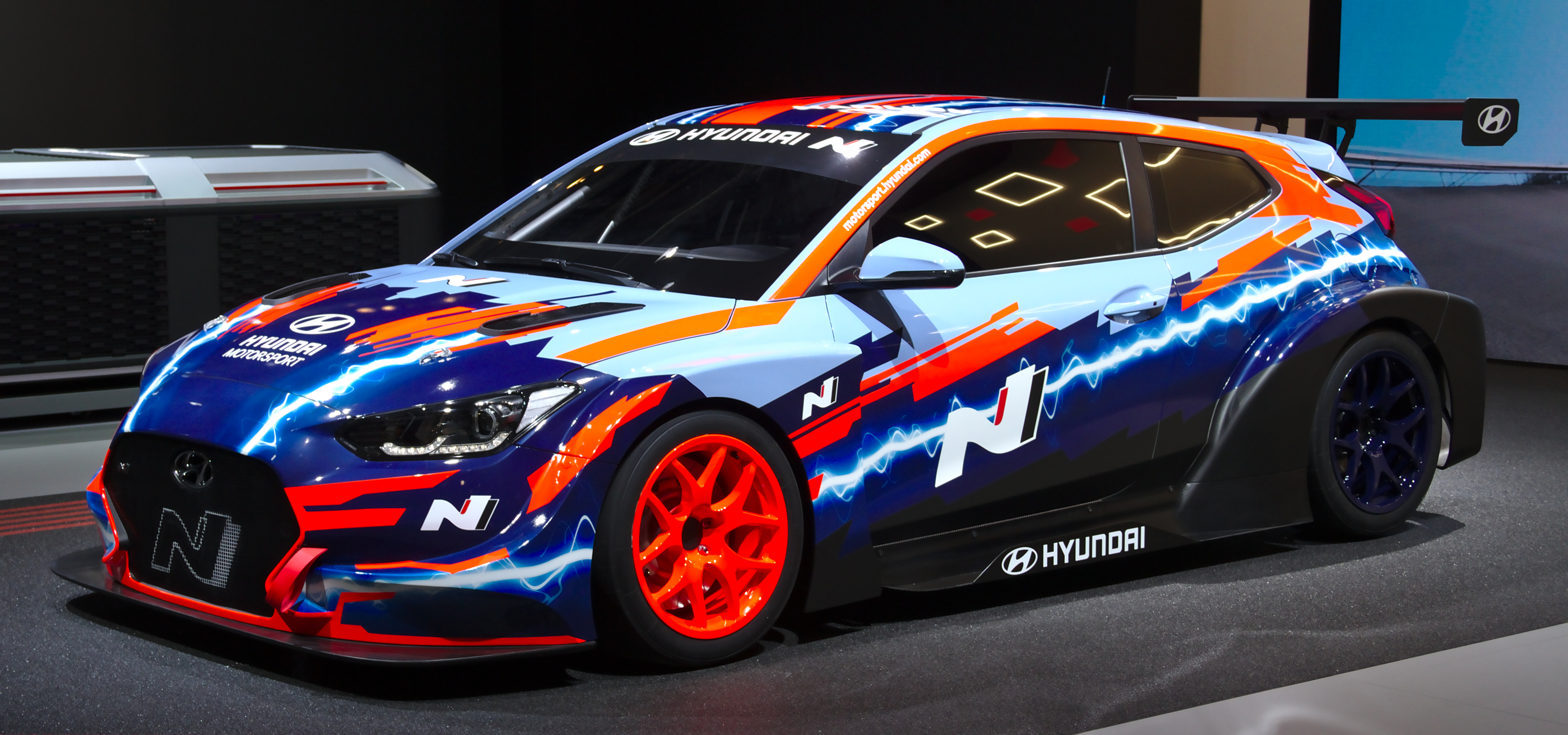
- Veloster N ETCR at IAA 2019

Overview
- Manufacturer: Hyundai Motorsport
- Assembly: Germany: Alzenau

Body and chassis
- Class: ETCR (racing)
- Layout: MR

Powertrain
- Electric motor: 4×, 2 per rear wheel; 500 kW (670 hp) (peak)
- Battery: 800 V; 65 kW-hr

Dimensions
- Wheelbase: 2,700 mm (106.3 in)
- Length: 4,450 mm (175.2 in)
- Width: 1,950 mm (76.8 in)
- Curb weight: 1,800 kg (3,968 lb)

The Veloster N ETCR is a battery electric racing vehicle with the drivetrain modified to accommodate mid-mounted motors and rear-wheel-drive. It debuted in September 2019 at IAA (Germany) and was campaigned in the FIA ETCR – eTouring Car World Cup series beginning with that series' inaugural season in 2021. It is the first electric racing car built by Hyundai.

The ETCR racer is assembled in Alzenau, Germany alongside other Hyundai N racing vehicles for rally and touring car series. Design work for the ETCR began in November 2018, and the prototype was first driven in August 2019. The final drivetrain specification was completed in 2020, and at the launch of the FIA PURE ETCR series in October of that year, Hyundai announced it would campaign the ETCR. A demonstration was held at the Daytona International Speedway during the 2021 Rolex 24 at Daytona.

In 2021, Hyundai driver Jean-Karl Vernay finished second in the PURE ETCR series, while Hyundai finished third (of three contestants) in the manufacturer's standings. The Veloster N ETCR returned for the second season in 2022, with the series rebranded to the eTouring Car World Championship. For 2023, Hyundai plan to race with a Ioniq 6-based vehicle and its modern E-GMP platform.

== Sales ==
Calendar Year	South Korea	United States	Global
2011		9,284	
2012		38,102	
2013		30,711	
2014		27,598	
2015		24,245	
2016	634	30,053	
2017	206	12,658	
2018	4,254	10,871	
2019	2,175	12,849	
2020	2,341	6,785	
2021	510	2,112	3,062
2022	183	1,920	2,339
2023	—N/a	6	

== Public image ==
Insurify, a car insurance comparison website, determined from its database of 2.5 million insurance applications in 2021 that 15.43% of Veloster owners have speeding violations, a rate 32% higher than the national average, placing it at 6th place for most speeding violations of any car in its database.
