= 2025 French GT4 Cup =

2025 Auto racing championship in France

The 2025 Championnat de France FFSA GT - GT4 France season was the 28th season of the French FFSA GT Championship and the 8th as the French GT4 Cup, a sports car championship created and organised by the SRO Motorsports Group. The season began on 18 April at Circuit Paul Armagnac and finished on 5 October at Circuit Paul Ricard.

== Calendar ==
Round	Circuit	Date	Supporting	Map of circuit locations
1	Circuit Paul Armagnac, Nogaro, France	18–21 April	TC France Series; French F4 Championship; Clio Cup Series; Alpine Elf Cup Series; Twin'Cup	2025 French GT4 Cup is located in France
2	Dijon-Prenois, Prenois, France	9–11 May	TC France Series; French F4 Championship; Clio Cup Series; Porsche Carrera Cup France; Mitjet France	2025 French GT4 Cup is located in France
3	Circuit de Spa-Francorchamps, Stavelot, Belgium	20–22 June	TC France Series; French F4 Championship; British GT Championship; Porsche Carrera Cup France; Mitjet France	2025 French GT4 Cup is located in France
4	Circuit de Nevers Magny-Cours, Magny-Cours, France	1–3 August	TC France Series; French F4 Championship; Clio Cup Series; GT World Challenge Europe Sprint Cup; Alpine Elf Cup Series	2025 French GT4 Cup is located in France
5	Circuit Paul Ricard, Le Castellet, France	3–5 October	TC France Series; McLaren Trophy Europe; Clio Cup Series; Porsche Carrera Cup France; Alpine Elf Cup Series	2025 French GT4 Cup is located in France

== Entry list ==
Team	Car	No.	Drivers	Class	Rounds
(France) Switch Racing	Ginetta G56 GTA	3	(France) Romain Damiani	GTA	3
(France) Switch Racing	Ginetta G56 GTA	3	(France) Clément Mateu	GTA	3
(France) Switch Racing	Ginetta G56 GTA	4	(United Kingdom) Peter Thompson	GTA	3
(France) Switch Racing	Ginetta G56 GTA	4	(Malaysia) Alister Yoong	GTA	3
(France) Mirage Racing	Aston Martin Vantage AMR GT4 Evo	5	(France) David Levy	Am	All
(France) Mirage Racing	Aston Martin Vantage AMR GT4 Evo	5	(United Kingdom) Jodie Sloss	Am	All
(France) Mirage Racing	Porsche 718 Cayman GT4 RS Clubsport	6	(France) Axel Van Straaten	PA	1, 3–5
(France) Mirage Racing	Porsche 718 Cayman GT4 RS Clubsport	6	(France) Rémi Van Straaten	PA	All
(France) Mirage Racing	Porsche 718 Cayman GT4 RS Clubsport	6	(France) Didier Van Straaten	PA	2
(France) Mirage Racing	Aston Martin Vantage AMR GT4 Evo	7	Stanislav Safronov	PA	All
(France) Mirage Racing	Aston Martin Vantage AMR GT4 Evo	7	Aleksandr Vaintrub	PA	All
(France) CMR	Ginetta G56 GT4 Evo	10	(France) Gwenaël Delomier	PA	All
(France) CMR	Ginetta G56 GT4 Evo	10	(France) Ethan Gialdini	PA	All
(France) CMR	Ginetta G56 GTA	11	(United Kingdom) Amy Tomlinson	GTA	3
(France) CMR	Ginetta G56 GTA	11	(United Kingdom) Mike Simpson	GTA	3
(France) CMR	Ginetta G56 GT4 Evo	18	(France) Nicolas Ciamin	PA	All
(France) CMR	Ginetta G56 GT4 Evo	18	(France) Rudy Servol	PA	All
(France) CMR	Alpine A110 GT4 Evo	63	(France) Stéphane Auriacombe	Am	2–5
(France) CMR	Alpine A110 GT4 Evo	63	(Belgium) Stéphane Lémeret	Am	2–5
(France) Circuit Toys	Toyota GR Supra GT4 Evo2	17	(France) Thomas Leal	Am	All
(France) Circuit Toys	Toyota GR Supra GT4 Evo2	17	(Sri Lanka) Dilantha Malagamuwa	Am	2–4
(France) Circuit Toys	Toyota GR Supra GT4 Evo2	17	(Belgium) Giovanni Scamardi	Am	5
(France) Chazel Technologie Course	BMW M4 GT4 Evo (G82)	20	(Belgium) Lucas Cartelle	PA	3, 5
(France) Chazel Technologie Course	BMW M4 GT4 Evo (G82)	20	(Belgium) Armand Fumal	PA	3
(France) Chazel Technologie Course	BMW M4 GT4 Evo (G82)	20	(France) Jean-Mathieu Léandri	PA	5
(France) Chazel Technologie Course	Alpine A110 GT4+	111	(France) Nelson Panciatici	PA	1–3
(France) Chazel Technologie Course	Alpine A110 GT4+	111	(France) Rodolphe Wallgren	PA	1–3
(France) JSB Compétition	Porsche 718 Cayman GT4 RS Clubsport	24	(France) Viny Beltramelli	PA	All
(France) JSB Compétition	Porsche 718 Cayman GT4 RS Clubsport	24	(France) Julien Paget	PA	All
(France) Saintéloc Racing	Audi R8 LMS GT4	25	(Belgium) Lorens Lecertua	PA	1–3
(France) Saintéloc Racing	Audi R8 LMS GT4	25	(France) Sébastien Rambaud	PA	1–2, 5
(France) Saintéloc Racing	Audi R8 LMS GT4	25	(Switzerland) Benjamin Ricci	PA	3
(France) Saintéloc Racing	Audi R8 LMS GT4	25	(Switzerland) Lucas Légeret	PA	4–5
(France) Saintéloc Racing	Audi R8 LMS GT4	25	(France) Marc Rostan	PA	4
(France) Code Racing Development	Alpine A110 GT4 Evo	36	(France) Pascal Huteau	PA	All
(France) Code Racing Development	Alpine A110 GT4 Evo	36	(France) Gaspard Simon	PA	All
(France) Code Racing Development	Alpine A110 GT4 Evo	38	(France) Yves Lemaitre	Am 1 PA 2–4	All
(France) Code Racing Development	Alpine A110 GT4 Evo	38	(France) Julien Sabatier	Am 1 PA 2–4	1
(France) Code Racing Development	Alpine A110 GT4 Evo	38	(France) Vincent Beltoise	Am 1 PA 2–4	2–5
(France) Team Speedcar	Audi R8 LMS GT4	44	(France) Philippe Thalamy	Am	3
(San Marino) W&D Racing Team	BMW M4 GT4 Evo (G82)	48	(San Marino) Davide Meloni	PA	3
(San Marino) W&D Racing Team	BMW M4 GT4 Evo (G82)	48	(San Marino) Paolo Meloni	PA	3
(France) Vic'Team	Mercedes-AMG GT4	64	(France) Olivier Jouffret	PA	All
(France) Vic'Team	Mercedes-AMG GT4	64	(France) Eric Trémoulet	PA	All
(France) GPA Racing	Porsche 718 Cayman GT4 RS Clubsport	72	(France) Florent Grizaud	Am	All
(France) GPA Racing	Porsche 718 Cayman GT4 RS Clubsport	72	(France) Kévin Jimenez	Am	All
(France) GPA Racing	Porsche 718 Cayman GT4 RS Clubsport	131	(France) Mathieu Casalonga	Am	1–4
(France) GPA Racing	Porsche 718 Cayman GT4 RS Clubsport	131	(France) Benjamin Cauvas	Am	2–4
(Germany) CV Performance Group	Mercedes-AMG GT4	85	(Germany) Kenneth Heyer	PA	5
(Germany) CV Performance Group	Mercedes-AMG GT4	85	(Germany) Alexander Kroker	PA	5
Entrylists:

Icon	Class
PA	Pro-Am Cup
Am	Am Cup
GTA	Ginetta GTA Cup

== Race results ==
Bold indicates overall winner.

Round		Circuit	Pole position	Pro-Am Winner	Am Winner	Ginetta GTA Winner
1	R1	(France) Circuit Paul Armagnac	(France) No. 18 CMR	**(France) No. 36 Code Racing Development**	(France) No. 72 GPA Racing	did not participate
1	R1	(France) Circuit Paul Armagnac	(France) Nicolas Ciamin (France) Rudy Servol	**(France) Pascal Huteau** **(France) Gaspard Simon**	(France) Florent Grizaud (France) Kévin Jimenez	did not participate
1	R2	(France) Circuit Paul Armagnac	(France) No. 10 CMR	**(France) No. 10 CMR**	(France) No. 63 CMR	did not participate
1	R2	(France) Circuit Paul Armagnac	(France) Gwenaël Delomier (France) Ethan Gialdini	**(France) Gwenaël Delomier** **(France) Ethan Gialdini**	(France) Stéphane Auriacombe (Belgium) Stéphane Lémeret	did not participate
2	R1	(France) Dijon-Prenois	(France) No. 10 CMR	**(France) No. 7 Mirage Racing**	(France) No. 63 CMR	did not participate
2	R1	(France) Dijon-Prenois	(France) Gwenaël Delomier (France) Ethan Gialdini	**Stanislav Safronov**; **Aleksandr Vaintrub**	(France) Stéphane Auriacombe (Belgium) Stéphane Lémeret	did not participate
2	R2	(France) Dijon-Prenois	(France) No. 64 Vic'Team	**(France) No. 64 Vic'Team**	(France) No. 63 CMR	did not participate
2	R2	(France) Dijon-Prenois	(France) Olivier Jouffret (France) Eric Trémoulet	**(France) Olivier Jouffret** **(France) Eric Trémoulet**	(France) Stéphane Auriacombe (Belgium) Stéphane Lémeret	did not participate
3	R1	(Belgium) Circuit de Spa-Francorchamps	(France) No. 64 Vic'Team	**(France) No. 7 Mirage Racing**	(France) No. 5 Mirage Racing	(France) No. 11 CMR
3	R1	(Belgium) Circuit de Spa-Francorchamps	(France) Olivier Jouffret (France) Eric Trémoulet	**Stanislav Safronov**; **Aleksandr Vaintrub**	(France) David Levy (United Kingdom) Jodie Sloss	(United Kingdom) Amy Tomlinson (United Kingdom) Mike Simpson
3	R2	(Belgium) Circuit de Spa-Francorchamps	(France) No. 7 Mirage Racing	**(France) No. 10 CMR**	(France) No. 72 GPA Racing	(France) No. 4 Switch Racing
3	R2	(Belgium) Circuit de Spa-Francorchamps	Stanislav Safronov; Aleksandr Vaintrub	**(France) Gwenaël Delomier** **(France) Ethan Gialdini**	(France) Florent Grizaud (France) Kévin Jimenez	(United Kingdom) Peter Thompson (Malaysia) Alister Yoong
4	R1	(France) Circuit de Nevers Magny-Cours	(France) No. 36 Code Racing Development	**(France) No. 36 Code Racing Development**	(France) No. 63 CMR	did not participate
4	R1	(France) Circuit de Nevers Magny-Cours	(France) Pascal Huteau (France) Gaspard Simon	**(France) Pascal Huteau** **(France) Gaspard Simon**	(France) Stéphane Auriacombe (Belgium) Stéphane Lémeret	did not participate
4	R2	(France) Circuit de Nevers Magny-Cours	(France) No. 18 CMR	**(France) No. 18 CMR**	(France) No. 63 CMR	did not participate
4	R2	(France) Circuit de Nevers Magny-Cours	(France) Nicolas Ciamin (France) Rudy Servol	**(France) Nicolas Ciamin** **(France) Rudy Servol**	(France) Stéphane Auriacombe (Belgium) Stéphane Lémeret	did not participate
5	R1	(France) Circuit Paul Ricard	(France) No. 38 Code Racing Development	**(France) No. 64 Vic'Team**	(France) No. 17 Circuit Toys	did not participate
5	R1	(France) Circuit Paul Ricard	(France) Yves Lemaitre (France) Vincent Beltoise	**(France) Olivier Jouffret** **(France) Eric Trémoulet**	(France) Thomas Leal (Belgium) Giovanni Scamardi	did not participate
5	R2	(France) Circuit Paul Ricard	(France) No. 7 Mirage Racing	**(France) No. 7 Mirage Racing**	(France) No. 63 CMR	did not participate
5	R2	(France) Circuit Paul Ricard	Stanislav Safronov; Aleksandr Vaintrub	**Stanislav Safronov**; **Aleksandr Vaintrub**	(France) Stéphane Auriacombe (Belgium) Stéphane Lémeret	did not participate

== Championship standings ==
=== Scoring system ===
1 hour races
Position	**1st**	**2nd**	**3rd**	**4th**	**5th**	**6th**	**7th**	**8th**	**9th**	**10th**	**Pole**
Points	25	18	15	12	10	8	6	4	2	1	1
2 hour races
Position	**1st**	**2nd**	**3rd**	**4th**	**5th**	**6th**	**7th**	**8th**	**9th**	**10th**	**Pole**
Points	33	24	19	15	12	9	6	4	2	1	1

=== Drivers' championship ===
==== Pro-Am Cup ====
Pos.	Driver	Team	NOG (France)		DIJ (France)		SPA (Belgium)		MAG (France)		LEC (France)		Points
1	Stanislav Safronov; Aleksandr Vaintrub	(France) Mirage Racing	6	3	1	3	1	**2**	6	3	4	**1**	171
2	(France) Pascal Huteau (France) Gaspard Simon	(France) Code Racing Development	1	7	6	2	3	7	**1**	2	2	2	158
3	(France) Olivier Jouffret (France) Eric Trémoulet	(France) Vic'Team	2	4	2	**1**	**2**	Ret	4	4	1	4	157
4	(France) Nicolas Ciamin (France) Rudy Servol	(France) CMR	**4**	2	4	5	Ret	3	5	**1**	5	Ret	116
5	(France) Gwenaël Delomier (France) Ethan Gialdini	(France) CMR	10	**1**	**5**	Ret	DSQ	1	Ret	Ret	13†	Ret	70
6	(France) Rémi Van Straaten	(France) Mirage Racing	5	6	15†	11	5	13	7	7	7	12	67
7	(France) Nelson Panciatici (France) Rodolphe Wallgren	(France) Chazel Technologie Course	3	13†	3	4	6	4					66
8	(France) Viny Beltramelli (France) Julien Paget	(France) JSB Compétition	7	Ret	7	14†	Ret	Ret	2	5	6	5	64
9	(France) Axel Van Straaten	(France) Mirage Racing	5	6			5	13	7	7	7	12	62
10	(France) Yves Lemaitre (France) Vincent Beltoise	(France) Code Racing Development			11	6	Ret	Ret	3	10	**8**	8	50
11	(San Marino) Davide Meloni (San Marino) Paolo Meloni	(San Marino) W&D Racing Team					4	6					20
12	(Belgium) Lorens Lecertua	(France) Saintéloc Racing	13	5	14	9	Ret	WD					20
12	(France) Sébastien Rambaud (Note: Rambaud was ineligible to score points in the final round.)	(France) Saintéloc Racing	13	5	14	9					3	3	20
13	(Belgium) Lucas Cartelle	(France) Chazel Technologie Course					8	5			DNS	DNS	16
13	(Belgium) Armand Fumal	(France) Chazel Technologie Course					8	5					16
14	(France) Didier Van Straaten	(France) Mirage Racing			15†	11							5
Guest drivers ineligible to score points
–	(Switzerland) Lucas Légeret	(France) Saintéloc Racing							12	6	3	3	–
–	(France) Marc Rostan	(France) Saintéloc Racing							12	6			–
–	(Germany) Kenneth Heyer (Germany) Alexander Kroker	(Germany) CV Performance Group									Ret	11	–
–	(Switzerland) Benjamin Ricci	(France) Saintéloc Racing					Ret	WD					–
–	(France) Jean-Mathieu Léandri	(France) Chazel Technologie Course									DNS	DNS	–
Pos.	Driver	Team	NOG (France)		DIJ (France)		SPA (Belgium)		MAG (France)		LEC (France)		Points

Colour	Result
Gold	Winner
Silver	Second place
Bronze	Third place
Green	Points classification
Blue	Non-points classification
Blue	Non-classified finish (NC)
Purple	Retired, not classified (Ret)
Red	Did not qualify (DNQ)
Red	Did not pre-qualify (DNPQ)
Black	Disqualified (DSQ)
White	Did not start (DNS)
White	Withdrew (WD)
White	Race cancelled (C)
Blank	Did not practice (DNP)
Blank	Did not arrive (DNA)
Blank	Excluded (EX)

**Bold** – Pole

Italics – Fastest Lap

† — Did not finish, but classified

==== Am Cup ====
Pos.	Driver	Team	NOG (France)		DIJ (France)		SPA (Belgium)		MAG (France)		LEC (France)		Points
1	(France) Stéphane Auriacombe (Belgium) Stéphane Lémeret	(France) CMR	**9**	**8**	**8**	7	15†	10	**8**	8	**12**	6	213
2	(France) Florent Grizaud (France) Kévin Jimenez	(France) GPA Racing	8	9	10	8	Ret	8	9	9	10	7	180
3	(France) David Levy (United Kingdom) Jodie Sloss	(France) Mirage Racing	12	Ret	9	**10**	7	**9**	10	11	11	**9**	154
4	(France) Thomas Leal (Note: Leal was ineligble to score points in the final round.)	(France) Circuit Toys	15	10	13	13	11	11	13	12	9	10	89
4	(Sri Lanka) Dilantha Malagamuwa	(France) Circuit Toys	15	10	13	13	11	11	13	12			89
5	(France) Mathieu Casalonga	(France) GPA Racing	11	12	12	12	10	12	11	**Ret**			87
5	(France) Benjamin Cauvas	(France) GPA Racing			12	12	10	12	11	**Ret**			62
6	(France) Philippe Thalamy	(France) Team Speedcar					**9**	14					27
7	(France) Yves Lemaitre (France) Julien Sabatier	(France) Code Racing Development	14	11									22
Guest drivers ineligible to score points
–	(Belgium) Giovanni Scamardi	(France) Circuit Toys									9	10	–
Pos.	Driver	Team	NOG (France)		DIJ (France)		SPA (Belgium)		MAG (France)		LEC (France)		Points

=== Teams' championship ===
In the teams' championship only the highest-finishing car from each team scores points, other cars from the same team are ignored, so cars from other teams move up in points.

==== Pro-Am Cup ====
Pos.	Team	NOG (France)		DIJ (France)		SPA (Belgium)		MAG (France)		LEC (France)		Points
1	(France) Mirage Racing	5	2	1	3	1	**2**	5	3	4	**1**	178
2	(France) Code Racing Development	1	5	5	2	3	5	**1**	2	**2**	2	169
3	(France) Vic'Team	2	3	2	**1**	**2**	Ret	3	4	1	4	163
4	(France) CMR	**4**	**1**	4	5	Ret	1	4	**1**	5	Ret	137
5	(France) Chazel Technologie Course	3	6†	3	4	5	3			DNS	DNS	75
6	(France) JSB Compétition	6	Ret	6	7†	Ret	Ret	2	5	6	5	72
7	(France) Saintéloc Racing (Note: Saintéloc Racing were ineligible to score points in the final round.)	7	4	7	6	Ret	WD	6	6	3	3	32
8	(San Marino) W&D Racing Team					4	4					24
Pos.	Team	NOG (France)		DIJ (France)		SPA (Belgium)		MAG (France)		LEC (France)		Points

==== Am Cup ====
Pos.	Team	NOG (France)		DIJ (France)		SPA (Belgium)		MAG (France)		LEC (France)		Points
1	(France) CMR	**2**	**1**	**1**	1	5†	3	**1**	1	**4**	1	213
2	(France) GPA Racing	1	2	3	2	3	1	2	**2**	2	2	196
3	(France) Mirage Racing	3	Ret	2	**3**	1	**2**	3	3	3	**3**	157
4	(France) Circuit Toys (Note: Circuit Toys were ineligble to score points in the final round.)	5	3	4	4	4	4	4	4	1	4	97
5	(France) Team Speedcar					**2**	5					29
6	(France) Code Racing Development	4	4									24
Pos.	Team	NOG (France)		DIJ (France)		SPA (Belgium)		MAG (France)		LEC (France)		Points

== See also ==
- 2025 British GT Championship
- 2025 GT4 European Series
- 2025 GT4 America Series
- 2025 GT4 Australia Series
- 2025 SRO GT Cup
