= 2019 TitansRX season =

First edition of TitansRX

The 2019 TitansRX season was the first edition of TitansRX. It was also named the TitansRX International Europe Series. The inaugural season was contested exclusively in Europe. The season consisted of twelve rounds and started on 29 June with the first French round at Essay with the season culminating on 20 October, at Estering.

== Calendar ==
Rnd.	Event	Dates	Venue	Class	Winner	Team
1	(France) TitansRX Rallycross d'Essay	29 June	Circuit des Ducs, Essay	TitansRX	(Finland) Toomas Heikkinen	
1	(France) TitansRX Rallycross d'Essay	29 June	Circuit des Ducs, Essay	Division 3	(France) Maxime Sordet	
1	(France) TitansRX Rallycross d'Essay	29 June	Circuit des Ducs, Essay	Division 4	(France) Geoffroy Blanchard	
2	(France) TitansRX Rallycross d'Essay	30 June	Circuit des Ducs, Essay	TitansRX	(Sweden) Timmy Hansen	(Sweden) Hansen Motorsport
2	(France) TitansRX Rallycross d'Essay	30 June	Circuit des Ducs, Essay	Division 3	(France) Benoît Morel	
2	(France) TitansRX Rallycross d'Essay	30 June	Circuit des Ducs, Essay	Division 4	(France) Geoffroy Blanchard	
3–4	(United Kingdom) TitansRX Rallycross Lydden Hill	27–28 July	Lydden Hill Race Circuit, Denton with Wootton	TitansRX (Day 1)	(Finland) Toomas Heikkinen	
3–4	(United Kingdom) TitansRX Rallycross Lydden Hill	27–28 July	Lydden Hill Race Circuit, Denton with Wootton	TitansRX (Day 2)	(Sweden) Kevin Hansen	(Sweden) Hansen Motorsport
3–4	(United Kingdom) TitansRX Rallycross Lydden Hill	27–28 July	Lydden Hill Race Circuit, Denton with Wootton	Supercar	(Germany) René Münnich	(Germany) Münnich Motorsport
3–4	(United Kingdom) TitansRX Rallycross Lydden Hill	27–28 July	Lydden Hill Race Circuit, Denton with Wootton	Group B	(United Kingdom) Steve Harris	
3–4	(United Kingdom) TitansRX Rallycross Lydden Hill	27–28 July	Lydden Hill Race Circuit, Denton with Wootton	Super Retro	(United Kingdom) John Cross	
3–4	(United Kingdom) TitansRX Rallycross Lydden Hill	27–28 July	Lydden Hill Race Circuit, Denton with Wootton	Retro	(United Kingdom) Terry Moore	
3–4	(United Kingdom) TitansRX Rallycross Lydden Hill	27–28 July	Lydden Hill Race Circuit, Denton with Wootton	Junior RX	(Latvia) Roberts Vītols	(United Kingdom) Peter Gwynne Motorsport
5–6	(Portugal) TitansRX Rallycross Montalegre	10–11 August	Pista Automóvel de Montalegre, Montalegre	TitansRX (Day 1)	(Sweden) Kevin Hansen	(Sweden) Hansen Motorsport
5–6	(Portugal) TitansRX Rallycross Montalegre	10–11 August	Pista Automóvel de Montalegre, Montalegre	TitansRX (Day 2)	(Sweden) Timmy Hansen	(Sweden) Hansen Motorsport
5–6	(Portugal) TitansRX Rallycross Montalegre	10–11 August	Pista Automóvel de Montalegre, Montalegre	Super1600	(Portugal) Joaquim Machado	
5–6	(Portugal) TitansRX Rallycross Montalegre	10–11 August	Pista Automóvel de Montalegre, Montalegre	Kartcross	(Spain) Antón Muíños	
7	(Austria) TitansRX Rallycross MJP Arena	7 September	MJP Racing Arena, Altenburg	TitansRX	(Finland) Toomas Heikkinen	
7	(Austria) TitansRX Rallycross MJP Arena	7 September	MJP Racing Arena, Altenburg	SuperTouringCar	(Austria) Karl Schadenhofer	
8	(Austria) TitansRX Rallycross MJP Arena	8 September	MJP Racing Arena, Altenburg	TitansRX	(Sweden) Timmy Hansen	(Sweden) Hansen Motorsport
8	(Austria) TitansRX Rallycross MJP Arena	8 September	MJP Racing Arena, Altenburg	SuperTouringCar	(Belgium) Jos Sterkens	
9	(Hungary) TitansRX Rallycross Nyirád	5 October	Nyirád Motorsport Centrum, Nyirád	TitansRX	(Sweden) Timmy Hansen	(Sweden) Hansen Motorsport
9	(Hungary) TitansRX Rallycross Nyirád	5 October	Nyirád Motorsport Centrum, Nyirád	Supercar	(Hungary) Tamás Kárai	(Hungary) Kárai Motorsport Egyesület
10	(Hungary) TitansRX Rallycross Nyirád	6 October	Nyirád Motorsport Centrum, Nyirád	TitansRX	(Sweden) Kevin Hansen	(Sweden) Hansen Motorsport
10	(Hungary) TitansRX Rallycross Nyirád	6 October	Nyirád Motorsport Centrum, Nyirád	Supercar	(Germany) René Münnich	(Germany) Münnich Motorsport
11–12	(Germany) TitansRX Rallycross Estering	19–20 October	Estering, Buxtehude	TitansRX (Day 1)	(France) Jérôme Grosset-Janin	
11–12	(Germany) TitansRX Rallycross Estering	19–20 October	Estering, Buxtehude	TitansRX (Day 2)	(Sweden) Kevin Hansen	(Sweden) Hansen Motorsport
11–12	(Germany) TitansRX Rallycross Estering	19–20 October	Estering, Buxtehude	Spezialcross-Buggy	(Germany) Bernd Stubbe	

=== Support classes ===
Each round will consist of support classes as listed below.

- Round 1-2, French Division 3 and Division 4.
- Round 3-4, Supercar, Retro Rallycross (Retro, Super Retro, Group B) and Junior Rallycross.
- Round 5-6, Super1600 and Kartcross.
- Round 7-8, SuperTouringCar.
- Round 9-10, Supercar.
- Round 11-12, Spezialcross-Buggy.

== Drivers ==
Constructor	Car	Tyre	Body Skin	No.	Driver	Rounds
MJP	Pantera RX6	HO	Audi A1	6	(Austria) Reinhold Sampl	All
MJP	Pantera RX6	HO	Audi A1	57	(Finland) Toomas Heikkinen	All
MJP	Pantera RX6	HO	Audi A1	3	(Brazil) Nelson Piquet Jr.	1-4
MJP	Pantera RX6	HO	Audi A1	4	(United Kingdom) Oliver Webb	5-8, 11-12
MJP	Pantera RX6	HO	Audi A1	46	(Hungary) Tamás Turi	9-10
MJP	Pantera RX6	HO	Audi A1	55	(Germany) Andreas Steffen	1, 3-4
MJP	Pantera RX6	HO	Audi A1	42	(Republic of Ireland) Craig Breen	2, 5-8
MJP	Pantera RX6	HO	Audi A1	48	(Germany) Dietmar Brandt	9-10
MJP	Pantera RX6	HO	Audi A1	37	(Germany) René Münnich	11-12
MJP	Pantera RX6	HO	Audi A1	22	(United Kingdom) Perry McCarthy	3-9
MJP	Pantera RX6	HO	Audi A1	38	(Germany) Mandie August	11-12
MJP	Pantera RX6	HO	Mercedes-Benz A-Class	10	(Hungary) Lukács "Csucsu" Kornél	All
MJP	Pantera RX6	HO	Mercedes-Benz A-Class	177	(United Kingdom) Andrew Jordan	3-8
MJP	Pantera RX6	HO	Mercedes-Benz A-Class	47	(Sweden) Ramona Karlsson	9-10
MJP	Pantera RX6	HO	Mercedes-Benz A-Class	96	(Sweden) Kevin Eriksson	11-12
MJP	Pantera RX6	HO	Mercedes-Benz A-Class	4	(United Kingdom) Oliver Webb	3-4
MJP	Pantera RX6	HO	Mercedes-Benz A-Class	50	(Netherlands) Tom Coronel	5-6
MJP	Pantera RX6	HO	Mercedes-Benz A-Class	55	(Germany) Andreas Steffen	7-12
MJP	Pantera RX6	HO	Hyundai i30	25	(Italy) Tamara Molinaro	All
MJP	Pantera RX6	HO	Hyundai i30	90	(Germany) Ronny "C'Rock" Wechselberger	All
MJP	Pantera RX6	HO	Hyundai i30	74	(France) Jérôme Grosset-Janin	All
MJP	Pantera RX6	HO	Hyundai i30	21	(Sweden) Timmy Hansen	All
MJP	Pantera RX6	HO	Hyundai i30	71	(Sweden) Kevin Hansen	All
MJP	Pantera RX6	HO	Hyundai i30	11	(France) Antoine Massé	1-2
MJP	Pantera RX6	HO	Hyundai i30	30	(United Kingdom) Abbie Eaton	3-4, 7-12
MJP	Pantera RX6	HO	Hyundai i30	7	(Spain) Iván Ares	5-6
MJP	Pantera RX6	HO	Hyundai i30	20	(New Zealand) Hayden Paddon	1-2, 7-8
MJP	Pantera RX6	HO	Hyundai i30	40	(United Kingdom) Dan Rooke	3-4
MJP	Pantera RX6	HO	Hyundai i30	60	(Portugal) Armindo Araújo	5-6
MJP	Pantera RX6	HO	Hyundai i30	12	(Austria) Werner Panhauser	9-12

=== Driver and "car" changes ===
Body Skin	Livery		Races / Drivers							
Body Skin	Main colour(s)	Additional colour(s)	FRA 1 (France)	FRA 2 (France)	GBR 1 & 2 (United Kingdom)	PRT 1 & 2 (Portugal)	AUT 1 & 2 (Austria)	HUN 1 (Hungary)	HUN 2 (Hungary)	DEU 1 & 2 (Germany)
Audi A1	White	Dark grey, Red	(Austria) Reinhold Sampl							
Audi A1	White	Grey, Red	(Finland) Toomas Heikkinen							
Audi A1	Green	Yellow	(Brazil) Nelson Piquet Jr.			(United Kingdom) Oliver Webb		(Hungary) Tamás Turi		(United Kingdom) O. Webb
Audi A1	White	Red	(Germany) A. Steffen	(Republic of Ireland) C. Breen	(Germany) A. Steffen	(Republic of Ireland) Craig Breen		(Germany) Dietmar Brandt		(Germany) R. Münnich
Audi A1	White, Red	Blue			(United Kingdom) Perry McCarthy					(Germany) M. August
Mercedes-Benz A-Class	Grey	Black for RD1-4; Yellow for RD5-12	(Hungary) Lukács "Csucsu" Kornél							
Mercedes-Benz A-Class	White	Grey, Green			(United Kingdom) Andrew Jordan			(Sweden) Ramona Karlsson		(Sweden) K. Eriksson
Mercedes-Benz A-Class	Yellow for RD3-8; White for RD9-12	Red			(United Kingdom) O. Webb	(Netherlands) T. Coronel	(Germany) Andreas Steffen			
Hyundai i30	Red	Black	(Italy) Tamara Molinaro							
Hyundai i30	White	Red, Green	(Germany) Ronny "C'Rock" Wechselberger							
Hyundai i30	Yellow	Black	(France) Jérôme Grosset-Janin							
Hyundai i30	Dark blue	White for RD1-6; Blue, Grey for RD7-12	(Sweden) Timmy Hansen							
Hyundai i30	Yellow	None for RD1-6; Dark blue, Blue for RD7-12	(Sweden) Kevin Hansen							
Hyundai i30	Blue	White for RD1-10; Black for RD11-12	(France) Antoine Massé		(United Kingdom) A. Eaton	(Spain) I. Ares	(United Kingdom) Abbie Eaton			
Hyundai i30	White, Blue	Red	(New Zealand) Hayden Paddon		(United Kingdom) D. Rooke	(Portugal) A. Araújo	(New Zealand) H. Paddon	(Austria) Werner Panhauser		

- Round 1-2:
  - Craig Breen is driving the Audi A1 in RD2 used by Andreas Steffen in RD1.
- Round 3-4:
  - Andreas Steffen is driving the Audi A1 used by Craig Breen in RD2.
  - Abbie Eaton is driving the Hyundai i30 used by Antoine Massé in RD1-2.
  - Dan Rooke is driving the Hyundai i30 used by Hayden Paddon in RD1-2.
- Round 5-6:
  - Craig Breen is driving the Audi A1 used by Andreas Steffen in RD3-4.
  - Oliver Webb is driving the Audi A1 used by Nelson Piquet Jr. in RD1-4.
  - Tom Coronel is driving the Mercedes-Benz A-Class used by Oliver Webb in RD3-4.
  - Iván Ares is driving the Hyundai i30 used by Abbie Eaton in RD3-4.
  - Armindo Araújo is driving the Hyundai i30 used by Dan Rooke in RD3-4.
- Round 7-8:
  - Hayden Paddon is driving the Hyundai i30 used by Armindo Araújo in RD5-6.
  - Abbie Eaton is driving the Hyundai i30 used by Iván Ares in RD5-6.
  - Andreas Steffen is driving the Mercedes-Benz A-Class used by Tom Coronel in RD5-6.
- Round 9-10:
  - Werner Panhauser is driving the Hyundai i30 used by Hayden Paddon in RD7-8.
  - Dietmar Brandt is driving the Audi A1 used by Craig Breen in RD5-8.
  - Tamás Turi is driving the Audi A1 used by Oliver Webb in RD5-8.
  - Ramona Karlsson is driving the Mercedes-Benz A-Class used by Andrew Jordan in RD3-8.
- Round 11-12:
  - René Münnich is driving the Audi A1 used by Dietmar Brandt in RD9-10.
  - Mandie August is driving the Audi A1 used by Perry McCarthy in RD3-9.
  - Oliver Webb is driving the Audi A1 used by Tamás Turi in RD9-10.
  - Kevin Eriksson is driving the Mercedes-Benz A-Class used by Ramona Karlsson in RD9-10.

== Championship Standings ==
Pos.	Driver	FRA (France)		GBR (United Kingdom)		PRT (Portugal)		AUT (Austria)		HUN (Hungary)		GER (Germany)		Pts.
1	(Sweden) Kevin Hansen	2	2	3	1	1	2	2	3	3	1	2	1	317
2	(Sweden) Timmy Hansen	7	1	2	2	3	1	5	1	1	2	4	5	282
3	(Finland) Toomas Heikkinen	1	3	1	4	4	3	1	2	2	4	3	6	281
4	(France) Jérôme Grosset-Janin	3	4	10	15	9	12	6	6	4	3	1	3	213
5	(Italy) Tamara Molinaro	9	9	6	6	13	6	8	5	5	14	11	4	151
6	(Hungary) Lukács "Csucsu" Kornél	12	5	11	10	7	5	9	13	6	11	5	8	141
7	(Germany) Ronny "C'Rock" Wechselberger	6	8	7	5	10	8	7	NC	NC	12	7	9	124
8	(Germany) Andreas Steffen	5		8	8			15	8	7	6	8	11	103
9	(Republic of Ireland) Craig Breen		6			5	4	4	4					84
10	(United Kingdom) Oliver Webb			4	9	8	10	10	12			14	7	80
11	(Sweden) Kevin Eriksson											6	2	72
12	(United Kingdom) Andrew Jordan			13	3	2	7	11	11					67
13	(United Kingdom) Abbie Eaton			12	13			13	7	10	5	10	12	64
14	(New Zealand) Hayden Paddon	4	7					3	9					58
15	(Austria) Reinhold Sampl	8	10	14	14	12	15	12	14	8	8	15	15	55
16	(United Kingdom) Perry McCarthy			15	7	15	14	14	10	12				28
17	(Germany) René Münnich											9	10	28
18	(Brazil) Nelson Piquet Jr.	10	12	9	12									22
19	(Spain) Iván Ares					6	9							22
20	(United Kingdom) Dan Rooke			5	11									21
21	(Austria) Werner Panhauser									13	10	13	13	21
22	(Hungary) Tamás Turi									9	7			20
23	(Germany) Mandie August											12	14	12
24	(France) Antoine Massé	11	11											10
25	(Portugal) Armindo Araújo					11	11							10
26	(Germany) Dietmar Brandt									14	9			10
27	(Sweden) Ramona Karlsson									11	13			8
28	(Netherlands) Tom Coronel					14	13							5

== See also ==
- FIA European Rallycross Championship
