= 2025 McLaren Trophy Europe =

3rd season of the McLaren Trophy Europe

The 2025 McLaren Trophy Europe was a motor racing championship for McLaren Artura Trophy cars and the 3rd running of the McLaren Trophy Europe. It was organised and promoted by the SRO Motorsports Group. The championship was contested over five rounds, each with two races, held at various European circuits. It began in May and ended in October.

== Entries ==
All teams compete with tyres supplied by Pirelli as SRO Motorsports Group official tyre supplier. Additionally, Am drivers featuring in either the Pro-Am or Am classes are eligible for Papaya Cup points.

Team	No.	Class	Drivers	Rounds
(United Kingdom) Garage 59	8	Am	(Sweden) Alexander West	1
(United Kingdom) Paddock Motorsport	9	P	(United Kingdom) Tom Holland	4
(United Kingdom) Paddock Motorsport	9	P	(United Kingdom) Martin Plowman	4
(United Kingdom) Paddock Motorsport	9	PA	(United Kingdom) David Foster	5
(United Kingdom) Paddock Motorsport	9	PA	(United Kingdom) Tom Holland	5
(United Kingdom) Paddock Motorsport	40	PA	(United Kingdom) Nick Halstead	1–3
(United Kingdom) Paddock Motorsport	40	PA	(United Kingdom) Tom Holland	1–3
(United Kingdom) Paddock Motorsport	78	Am	(United Kingdom) Tim Docker PC	All
(Spain) SMC Motorsport	12	P	(United Kingdom) Will Aspin	All
(Spain) SMC Motorsport	12	P	(Spain) Alejandro Geppert	All
(Spain) SMC Motorsport	27	Am	(Spain) Rafael Muncharaz	4–5
(Spain) SMC Motorsport	68	P	(United Kingdom) Harry Burgoyne	All
(Spain) SMC Motorsport	68	P	(United Kingdom) Zac Meakin	All
(Spain) SMC Motorsport	69	PA	(United Kingdom) Bradley Ellis	All
(Spain) SMC Motorsport	69	PA	(Germany) Klaus Halsig PC	All
(United Kingdom) Greystone GT	14	PA	(United Kingdom) Michael Broadhurst	1
(United Kingdom) Greystone GT	14	PA	(United Kingdom) Phillip Carter	1
(United Kingdom) Greystone GT	17	P	(Australia) Jayden Kelly	All
(United Kingdom) Greystone GT	17	P	(United Kingdom) Michael O'Brien	All
(United Kingdom) Greystone GT	22	PA	(United Kingdom) Ryan James	All
(United Kingdom) Greystone GT	22	PA	(United Kingdom) Oliver Webb	All
(United Kingdom) Greystone GT	33	Am	(United States) Bill Fenech	3
(United Kingdom) Greystone GT	33	Am	(United Kingdom) Chris Hall	3
(United Kingdom) Greystone GT	43	P	(United Kingdom) Josh Mason	1–4
(United Kingdom) Greystone GT	43	P	(United Kingdom) Sam Nesar	1–4
(United Kingdom) Greystone GT	74	PA	(South Africa) Shaun Penrith	2
(United Kingdom) Greystone GT	74	PA	(South Africa) Stuart White	2
(United Kingdom) Greystone GT	80	PA	(United States) Ron Trenka PC	All
(United Kingdom) Greystone GT	80	PA	(United Kingdom) Jon Lancaster	1–4
(United Kingdom) Greystone GT	80	PA	(United Kingdom) Duncan Tappy	5
(United Kingdom) DTO Motorsport	15	Am	(United Kingdom) Danny Henrey PC	All
(Germany) MS Racing Team	28	Am	(Germany) Kevin Rohrscheidt	2–4
(Germany) MS Racing Team	28	Am	(Germany) Andreas Greiling	2, 4
(Germany) MS Racing Team	28	Am	(Germany) Jens Richter	3
(Netherlands) Neimann Autosport	42	PA	(Netherlands) Albert Jochems	3
(Netherlands) Neimann Autosport	42	PA	(Netherlands) Charles Zwolsman	3
(Estonia) ALM Motorsport	48	P	(Sweden) Mikael Karlsson	1–3, 5
(Estonia) ALM Motorsport	48	P	(Sweden) Lukas Sundahl	1–2
(Estonia) ALM Motorsport	48	P	(Sweden) Robin Knutsson	3, 5
(Estonia) ALM Motorsport	90	P	(United Kingdom) Samuel Harrison	2–5
(Estonia) ALM Motorsport	90	P	(United Kingdom) Leonidas Karavasili	2–5
(United Kingdom) Race Lab	49	PA	(United Kingdom) Maurice Henry	All
(United Kingdom) Race Lab	49	PA	(United Kingdom) Fiona James PC	All
(United Kingdom) ALFAB	88	PA	(Sweden) Erik Behrens	All
(United Kingdom) ALFAB	88	PA	(United Kingdom) Ashley Marshall	1–2
(United Kingdom) ALFAB	88	PA	(Sweden) Lukas Sundahl	3–5

Icon	Class
P	Pro class
PA	Pro-Am class
Am	Am class
PC	Papaya Cup

== Calendar ==
Round	Circuit	Date	Supporting
1	(United Kingdom) Brands Hatch, Kent	3–4 May	GT World Challenge Europe Sprint Cup
2	(Italy) Monza Circuit, Monza	30 May – 1 June	GT World Challenge Europe Endurance Cup
3	(Belgium) Circuit de Spa-Francorchamps, Stavelot	26–28 June	Intercontinental GT Challenge; GT World Challenge Europe Endurance Cup
4	(Germany) Nürburgring, Nürburg	29–31 August	GT World Challenge Europe Endurance Cup
5	(France) Circuit Paul Ricard, Le Castellet	3–5 October	TC France Series; French GT4 Cup

=== Calendar changes ===
Whilst the rounds at Monza, Spa-Franchorchamps and the Nürburgring remain unchanged from 2024, the series will make its debut at Brands Hatch for the opening round of the season. The championship will also race at Circuit Paul Ricard in support of the TC France Series and the French GT4 Cup to close the season.

== Regulation changes ==
=== Technical regulations ===
==== Car ====
For 2025, the series introduced the new McLaren Trophy Evo. The car features a 585PS engine with enhanced aerodynamics, wider tyres, new suspension uprights and upgraded anti-roll bars. The new car also incorporates a new Push-to-Pass feature which boosts the power output up to 620PS when activated.

=== Sporting regulations ===
==== Pro category ====
The 2025 season was the first to include a Pro category for Silver rated drivers. This coincides with the new McLaren Trophy Academy, where young drivers are provided with support to further their development.

==== Papaya Cup ====
A new award was introduced for the 2025 season, the Papaya Cup. The award is targeted at competitors with limited racing experience.

== Results and standings ==
=== Race results ===
Bold indicates overall winner.

Round		Circuit	Pole position	Pro Winners	Pro-Am Winners	Am Winners	Papaya Cup Winners
1	R1	(United Kingdom) Brands Hatch	(United Kingdom) No. 17 Greystone GT	**(United Kingdom) No. 17 Greystone GT**	(United Kingdom) No. 40 Paddock Motorsport	(United Kingdom) No. 8 Garage 59	(United Kingdom) No. 78 Paddock Motorsport
1	R1	(United Kingdom) Brands Hatch	(Australia) Jayden Kelly (United Kingdom) Michael O'Brien	**(Australia) Jayden Kelly** **(United Kingdom) Michael O'Brien**	(United Kingdom) Nick Halstead (United Kingdom) Tom Holland	(Sweden) Alexander West	(United Kingdom) Tim Docker
1	R2	(United Kingdom) Brands Hatch	(United Kingdom) No. 17 Greystone GT	**(United Kingdom) No. 17 Greystone GT**	(United Kingdom) No. 40 Paddock Motorsport	(United Kingdom) No. 8 Garage 59	(United Kingdom) No. 49 Race Lab
1	R2	(United Kingdom) Brands Hatch	(Australia) Jayden Kelly (United Kingdom) Michael O'Brien	**(Australia) Jayden Kelly** **(United Kingdom) Michael O'Brien**	(United Kingdom) Nick Halstead (United Kingdom) Tom Holland	(Sweden) Alexander West	(United Kingdom) Fiona James
2	R1	(Italy) Monza Circuit	(Spain) No. 12 SMC Motorsport	**(United Kingdom) No. 43 Greystone GT**	(United Kingdom) No. 22 Greystone GT	(United Kingdom) No. 15 DTO Motorsport	(Spain) No. 69 SMC Motorsport
2	R1	(Italy) Monza Circuit	(United Kingdom) Will Aspin (Spain) Alejandro Geppert	**(United Kingdom) Josh Mason** **(United Kingdom) Sam Neser**	(United Kingdom) Ryan James (United Kingdom) Oliver Webb	(United Kingdom) Danny Henrey	(Germany) Klaus Halsig
2	R2	(Italy) Monza Circuit	(United Kingdom) No. 17 Greystone GT	**(United Kingdom) No. 17 Greystone GT**	(United Kingdom) No. 22 Greystone GT	(Germany) No. 28 MS Racing Team	(Spain) No. 69 SMC Motorsport
2	R2	(Italy) Monza Circuit	(Australia) Jayden Kelly (United Kingdom) Michael O'Brien	**(Australia) Jayden Kelly** **(United Kingdom) Michael O'Brien**	(United Kingdom) Ryan James (United Kingdom) Oliver Webb	(Germany) Andreas Greiling (Germany) Kevin Rohrscheidt	(Germany) Klaus Halsig
3	R1	(Belgium) Circuit de Spa-Francorchamps	(United Kingdom) No. 43 Greystone GT	**(United Kingdom) No. 43 Greystone GT**	(United Kingdom) No. 88 ALFAB	(Germany) No. 28 MS Racing Team	(Spain) No. 69 SMC Motorsport
3	R1	(Belgium) Circuit de Spa-Francorchamps	(United Kingdom) Josh Mason (United Kingdom) Sam Neser	**(United Kingdom) Josh Mason** **(United Kingdom) Sam Neser**	(Sweden) Erik Behrens (Sweden) Lukas Sundahl	(Germany) Jens Richter (Germany) Kevin Rohrscheidt	(Germany) Klaus Halsig
3	R2	(Belgium) Circuit de Spa-Francorchamps	(Estonia) No. 48 ALM Motorsport	(Spain) No. 12 SMC Motorsport	**(United Kingdom) No. 88 ALFAB**	(Germany) No. 28 MS Racing Team	(United Kingdom) No. 49 Race Lab
3	R2	(Belgium) Circuit de Spa-Francorchamps	(Sweden) Mikael Karlsson (Sweden) Robin Knutsson	(United Kingdom) Will Aspin (Spain) Alejandro Geppert	**(Sweden) Erik Behrens** **(Sweden) Lukas Sundahl**	(Germany) Jens Richter (Germany) Kevin Rohrscheidt	(United Kingdom) Fiona James
4	R1	(Germany) Nürburgring	(United Kingdom) No. 17 Greystone GT	**(United Kingdom) No. 17 Greystone GT**	(United Kingdom) No. 22 Greystone GT	(Germany) No. 28 MS Racing Team	(Spain) No. 69 SMC Motorsport
4	R1	(Germany) Nürburgring	(Australia) Jayden Kelly (United Kingdom) Michael O'Brien	**(Australia) Jayden Kelly** **(United Kingdom) Michael O'Brien**	(United Kingdom) Ryan James (United Kingdom) Oliver Webb	(Germany) Andreas Greiling (Germany) Kevin Rohrscheidt	(Germany) Klaus Halsig
4	R2	(Germany) Nürburgring	(Spain) No. 68 SMC Motorsport	**(Spain) No. 68 SMC Motorsport**	(United Kingdom) No. 88 ALFAB	(Germany) No. 28 MS Racing Team	(United Kingdom) No. 49 Race Lab
4	R2	(Germany) Nürburgring	(United Kingdom) Harry Burgoyne (United Kingdom) Zac Meakin	**(United Kingdom) Harry Burgoyne** **(United Kingdom) Zac Meakin**	(Sweden) Erik Behrens (Sweden) Lukas Sundahl	(Germany) Andreas Greiling (Germany) Kevin Rohrscheidt	(United Kingdom) Fiona James
5	R1	(France) Circuit Paul Ricard	(Estonia) No. 90 ALM Motorsport	**(United Kingdom) No. 17 Greystone GT**	(United Kingdom) No. 88 ALFAB	(United Kingdom) No. 15 DTO Motorsport	(United Kingdom) No. 49 Race Lab
5	R1	(France) Circuit Paul Ricard	(United Kingdom) Samuel Harrison (United Kingdom) Leonidas Karavasili	**(Australia) Jayden Kelly** **(United Kingdom) Michael O'Brien**	(Sweden) Erik Behrens (Sweden) Lukas Sundahl	(United Kingdom) Danny Henrey	(United Kingdom) Fiona James
5	R2	(France) Circuit Paul Ricard	(United Kingdom) No. 17 Greystone GT	**(Spain) No. 68 SMC Motorsport**	(United Kingdom) No. 88 ALFAB	(Spain) No. 27 SMC Motorsport	(United Kingdom) No. 80 Greystone GT
5	R2	(France) Circuit Paul Ricard	(Australia) Jayden Kelly (United Kingdom) Michael O'Brien	**(United Kingdom) Harry Burgoyne** **(United Kingdom) Zac Meakin**	(Sweden) Erik Behrens (Sweden) Lukas Sundahl	(Spain) Rafael Muncharaz	(United States) Ron Trenka

=== Scoring system ===
Drivers' points

Championship points are awarded for the first ten positions in each race.

Position	**1st**	**2nd**	**3rd**	**4th**	**5th**	**6th**	**7th**	**8th**	**9th**	**10th**
Points	15	12	10	8	6	5	4	3	2	1

=== Drivers' Championship standings ===
==== Pro ====
Pos.	Driver	Team	BRH (United Kingdom)		MON (Italy)		SPA (Belgium)		NÜR (Germany)		LEC (France)		Points
1	(Australia) Jayden Kelly (United Kingdom) Michael O'Brien	(United Kingdom) Greystone GT	1	1	2	1	Ret	DSQ	1	4	1	3	105
2	(United Kingdom) Samuel Harrison (United Kingdom) Leonidas Karavasili	(Estonia) ALM Motorsport			3	3	2	2	3	2	2	2	90
3	(United Kingdom) Will Aspin (Spain) Alejandro Geppert	(Spain) SMC Motorsport	DNS	2	4	2	5	1	4	3	4	4	87
4	(United Kingdom) Harry Burgoyne (United Kingdom) Zac Meakin	(Spain) SMC Motorsport	2	5	Ret	Ret	3	3	5	1	3	1	84
5	(United Kingdom) Josh Mason (United Kingdom) Sam Neser	(United Kingdom) Greystone GT	3	4	1	4	1	Ret	2	5	Ret	5	80
6	(Sweden) Mikael Karlsson	(Estonia) ALM Motorsport	Ret	3	5	Ret	4	4			5	6	43
7	(Sweden) Robin Knutsson	(Estonia) ALM Motorsport					4	4			5	6	27
8	(Sweden) Lukas Sundahl	(Estonia) ALM Motorsport	Ret	3	5	Ret							16
9	(United Kingdom) Tom Holland (United Kingdom) Martin Plowman	(United Kingdom) Paddock Motorsport							6	6			10
Pos.	Driver	Team	BRH (United Kingdom)		MON (Italy)		SPA (Belgium)		NÜR (Germany)		LEC (France)		Points

Key
Colour	Result
Gold	Race winner
Silver	2nd place
Bronze	3rd place
Green	Points finish
Blue	Non-points finish
Blue	Non-classified finish (NC)
Purple	Did not finish (Ret)
Black	Disqualified (DSQ)
Black	Excluded (EX)
White	Did not start (DNS)
White	Race cancelled (C)
White	Withdrew (WD)
Blank	Did not participate

==== Pro-Am ====
Pos.	Driver	Team	BRH (United Kingdom)		MON (Italy)		SPA (Belgium)		NÜR (Germany)		LEC (France)		Points
1	(United Kingdom) Ryan James (United Kingdom) Oliver Webb	(United Kingdom) Greystone GT	3	3	1	1	3	2	1	2	2	2	123
2	(Sweden) Erik Behrens	(United Kingdom) ALFAB	4	2	2	Ret	1	1	2	1	1	1	119
2	(United Kingdom) Ashley Marshall	(United Kingdom) ALFAB	4	2	2	Ret							119
2	(Sweden) Lukas Sandahl	(United Kingdom) ALFAB					1	1	2	1	1	1	119
3	(United States) Ron Trenka	(United Kingdom) Greystone GT	6	7	4	3	7	7	5	4	5	4	70
3	(United Kingdom) Jon Lancaster	(United Kingdom) Greystone GT	6	7	4	3	7	7	5	4			70
3	(United Kingdom) Duncan Tappy	(United Kingdom) Greystone GT									5	4	70
4	(United Kingdom) Bradley Ellis (Germany) Klaus Halsig	(Spain) SMC Motorsport	5	6	3	2	5	6	3	Ret	6	6	69
5	(United Kingdom) Maurice Henry (United Kingdom) Fiona James	(United Kingdom) Race Lab	Ret	5	Ret	4	6	4	4	3	4	5	63
6	(United Kingdom) Tom Holland	(United Kingdom) Paddock Motorsport	1	1	DSQ	Ret	2	3			3	3	52
6	(United Kingdom) Nick Halstead	(United Kingdom) Paddock Motorsport	1	1	DSQ	Ret	2	3					52
7	(United Kingdom) Michael Broadhurst (United Kingdom) Phillip Carter	(United Kingdom) Greystone GT	2	4									20
Not classified
–	(United Kingdom) David Foster	(United Kingdom) Paddock Motorsport									3	3	0
–	(Netherlands) Albert Jochems (Netherlands) Charles Zwolsman	(Netherlands) Neimann Autosport					4	5					0
–	(South Africa) Shaun Penrith (South Africa) Stuart White	(United Kingdom) Greystone GT			Ret	DNS							0
Pos.	Driver	Team	BRH (United Kingdom)		MON (Italy)		SPA (Belgium)		NÜR (Germany)		LEC (France)		Points

==== Am ====
Pos.	Driver	Team	BRH (United Kingdom)		MON (Italy)		SPA (Belgium)		NÜR (Germany)		LEC (France)		Points
1	(United Kingdom) Tim Docker	(United Kingdom) Paddock Motorsport	2	3	2	2	2	2	3	3	3	2	117
2	(United Kingdom) Danny Henrey	(United Kingdom) DTO Motorsport	3	2	1	3	Ret	Ret	2	2	1	DNS	86
3	(Germany) Kevin Rohrscheidt	(Germany) MS Racing Team			3	1	1	1	1	1			85
4	(Germany) Andreas Greiling	(Germany) MS Racing Team			3	1			1	1			55
5=	(Germany) Jens Richter	(Germany) MS Racing Team					1	1					30
5=	(Sweden) Alexander West	(United Kingdom) Garage 59	1	1									30
Not classified
–	(Spain) Rafael Muncharaz	(Spain) SMC Motorsport							Ret	4	2	1	0
–	(United States) Bill Fenech (United Kingdom) Chris Hall	(United Kingdom) Greystone GT					3	3					0
Pos.	Driver	Team	BRH (United Kingdom)		MON (Italy)		SPA (Belgium)		NÜR (Germany)		LEC (France)		Points

==== Papaya Cup ====
Pos.	Driver	Team	BRH (United Kingdom)		MON (Italy)		SPA (Belgium)		NÜR (Germany)		LEC (France)		Points
1	(Germany) Klaus Halsig	(Spain) SMC Motorsport	3	4	1	1	1	2	1	Ret	3	3	110
2	(United States) Ron Trenka	(United Kingdom) Greystone GT	4	5	2	2	3	3	3	3	2	1	105
3	(United Kingdom) Fiona James	(United Kingdom) Race Lab	Ret	1	Ret	4	2	1	2	1	1	2	102
4	(United Kingdom) Tim Docker	(United Kingdom) Paddock Motorsport	1	3	4	3	4	4	5	4	5	4	87
5	(United Kingdom) Danny Henrey	(United Kingdom) DTO Motorsport	2	2	3	5	Ret	Ret	4	2	4	DNS	70
Pos.	Driver	Team	BRH (United Kingdom)		MON (Italy)		SPA (Belgium)		NÜR (Germany)		LEC (France)		Points

=== Teams' Championship standings ===
Pos.	Team	Points
1	(United Kingdom) Greystone GT [Pro]	85
2	(United Kingdom) Greystone GT [Pro-Am]	83
3	(Spain) SMC Motorsport [Pro]	69
4	(United Kingdom) ALFAB	58
5	(Estonia) ALM Motorsport	52
6	(United Kingdom) Paddock Motorsport	42
7	(Germany) MS Racing Team	20
8	(Spain) SMC Motorsport [Pro-Am]	19
9	(United Kingdom) Race Lab	17
10	(United Kingdom) DTO Motorsport	14
11	(United Kingdom) Garage 59	8
–	(Netherlands) Neimann Autosport	0
Pos.	Team	Points

== See also ==
- 2025 McLaren Trophy America
