= Oliver Webb =

British auto racing driver (born 1991)

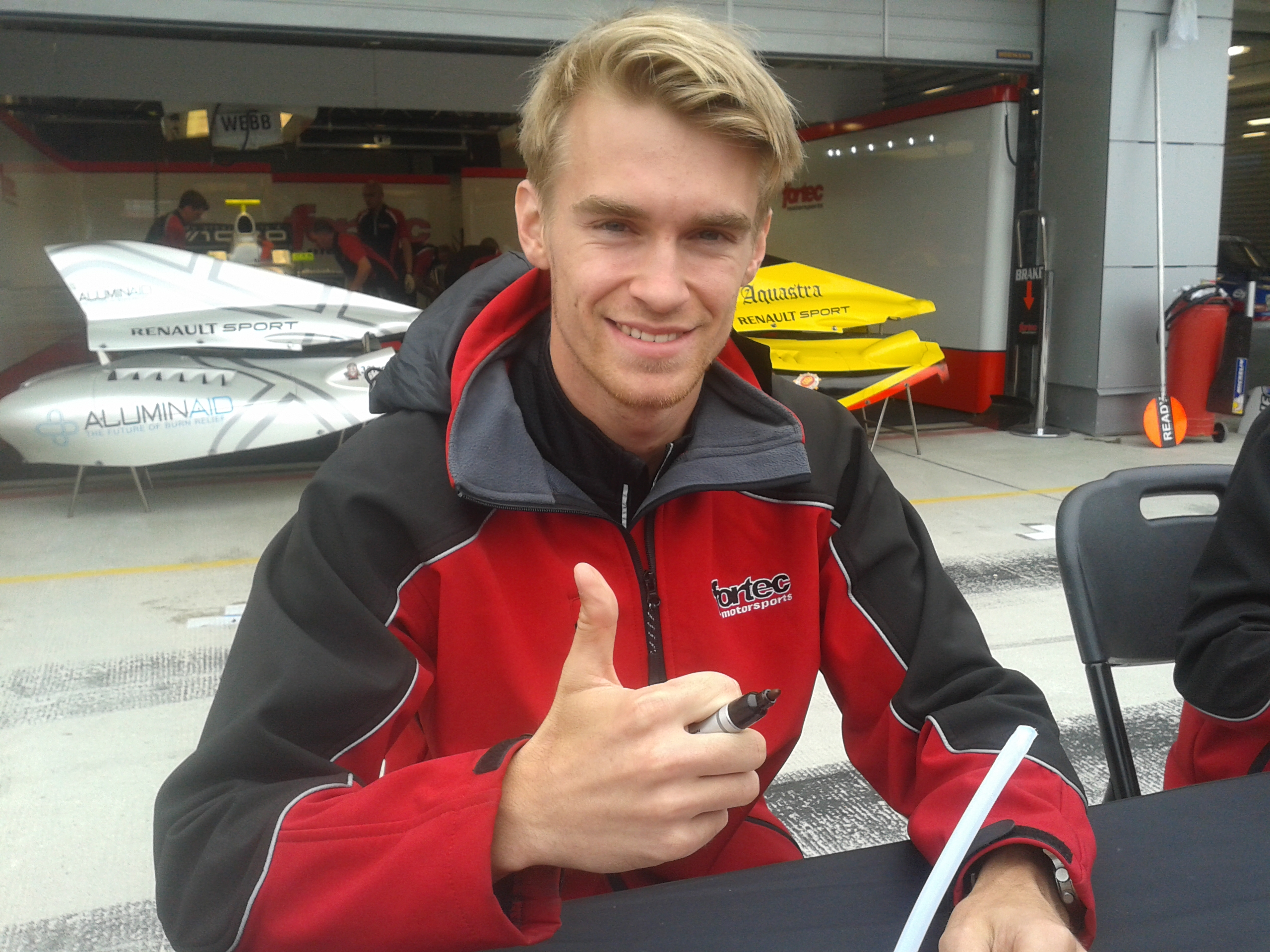
- Webb in 2013
- Nationality: (United Kingdom) British
- Born: Oliver James Webb; 20 March 1991 (age 35) Manchester, Greater Manchester, England

FIA World Endurance Championship career
- Debut season: 2015
- Current team: ARC Bratislava
- Categorisation: FIA Gold
- Car number: 44
- Former teams: ByKolles Racing Team; Team SARD Morand
- Starts: 32

Previous series
- 2011-12 2010 2009 2008–09 2008 2008 2007–08 2007 2005 2005–06: Indy Lights; British Formula 3 Eurocup Formula Renault 2.0; Formula Renault 2.0 UK; FR2.0 Portugal Winter Series; Formula Renault 2.0 NEC; FR2.0 UK Winter Series; Formula BMW UK; T Cars Autumn Trophy; T Cars

Awards
- 2006, 2007, 2010, 2014, 2015: Formula BMW Scholarship, 2014 European Le Mans Championship, 2014 Le Mans podium, 2015 Dubai Champions

Oliver "Oli" James Webb (born 20 March 1991 in Manchester) is a British auto racing driver. He is a 2004 Karting Champion, 2007 Formula BMW Scholarship winner, 2010 Formula 3 competitor, 2014 European Le Mans series Champion, 2015 Dubai 24 Hour Champion, and W Motors Ambassador.

== Career ==
=== Karting ===
Webb began his career in karting at the age of nine, progressing up through the ranks in the Greater Manchester karting scene with the help of management from British Touring Car Championship driver Michael Bentwood. With more experience, Webb started to win races at the Three Sisters Karting Circuit in Ashton-in-Makerfield, eventually winning that circuit's Mini Max Championship in 2004. He finished fourth in the Junior Max Championship in 2005, combining that with a season in T Cars.

=== T Cars ===
Webb moved into T Cars with Graham Hathaway Engineering in 2005, combining the campaign with schoolwork and his karting career. He continued into the 2005 Autumn Trophy, finishing second to Adrian Quaife-Hobbs. He finished third in the 2006 main series, winning three races, a non-championship double-header at Brands Hatch, and achieved a record seven fastest laps in a season.

=== Formula BMW ===
At the conclusion of the 2006 season, Bentwood entered Webb into the Formula BMW Scholarship Programme where drivers had the opportunity to be awarded with a financial contribution towards their racing budget, and an education and coaching programme from BMW Motorsport. Webb was one of the six chosen drivers for the scholarship, moving into Formula BMW UK in 2007. Webb drove for Carlin Motorsport, alongside Henry Surtees. Webb finished ninth in the championship, despite not finishing on the podium in any of the twenty races.

=== Formula Renault ===
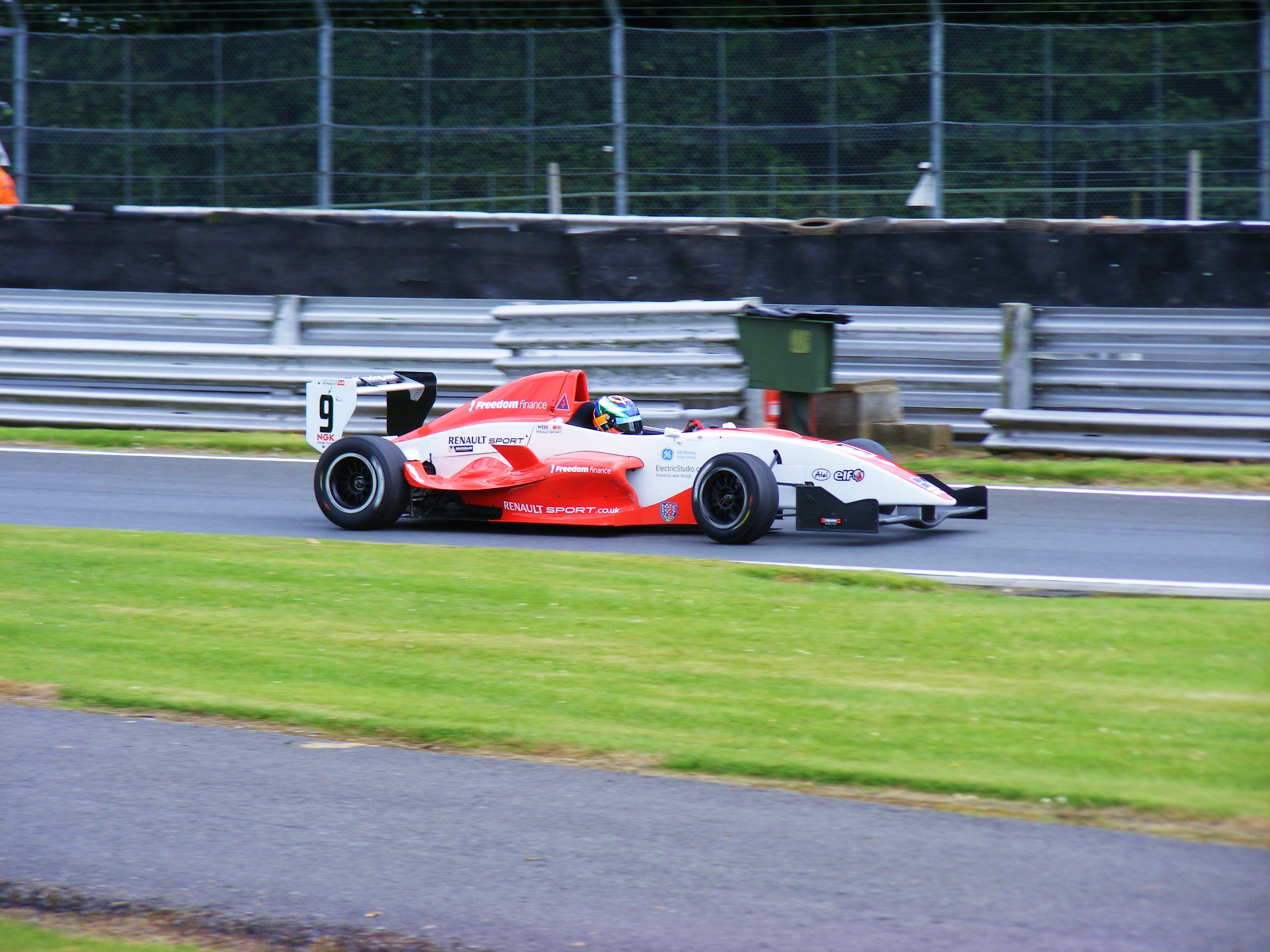
Webb competing during the 2008 Formula Renault UK season at Oulton Park.

Webb moved to the British Formula Renault Championship to compete in the Winter Series in 2007. Competing for Fortec Motorsport, Webb finished fifteenth in the four-race series, with a best race result of eleventh at Croft. Webb continued his progression up the British motorsport ladder, by moving into the main British series for the 2008 season. Staying with Fortec, Webb finished every single race in the points en route to eighth in the overall championship. His best result was fourth place at round seventeen, at Silverstone. He finished third in the Graduates Cup for first-year drivers, behind Dean Stoneman and James Calado.

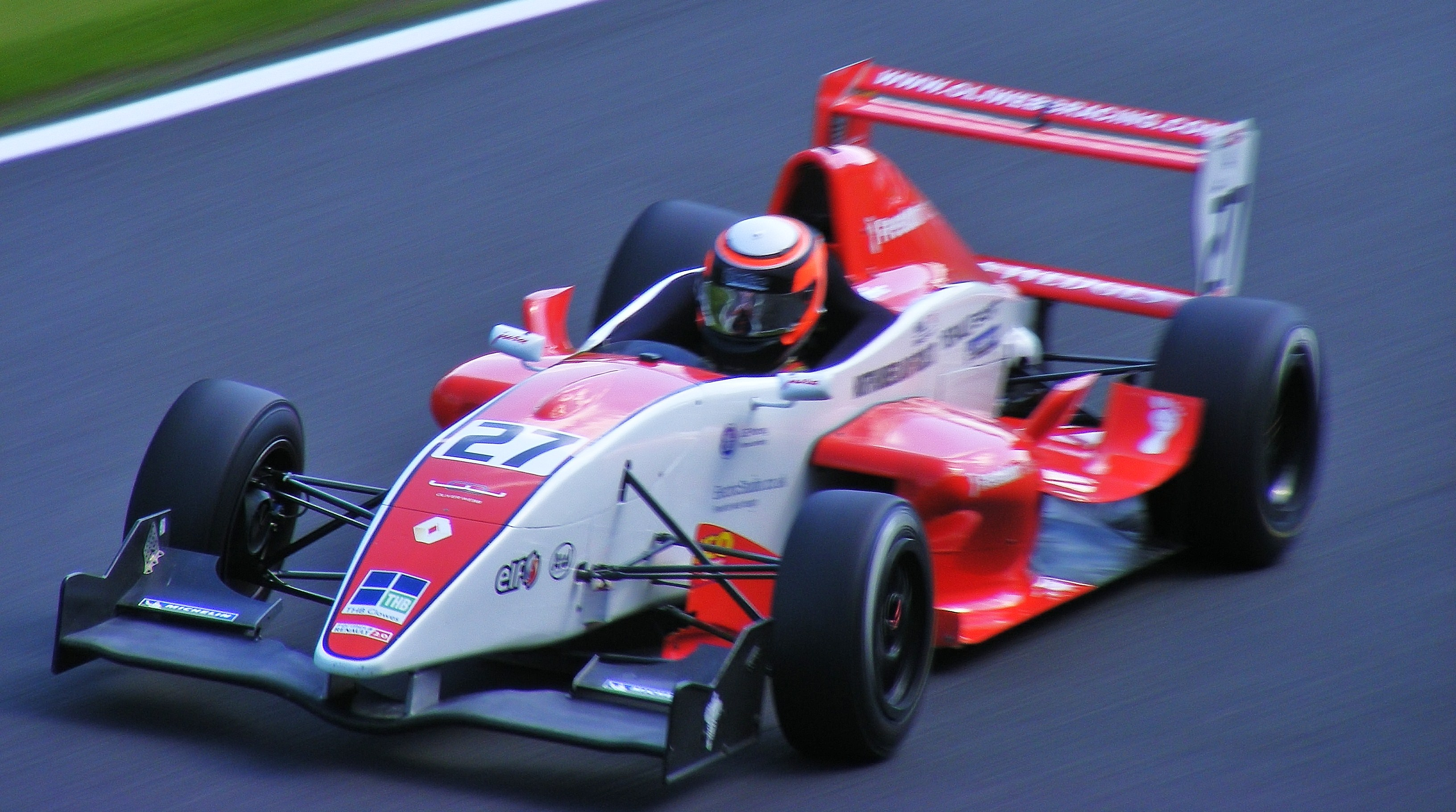
Webb competing during the 2009 Formula Renault UK season at Oulton Park.

Webb competed in three other Formula Renault series during the season, competing in the Northern European Cup, and the British and Portuguese Winter Series championships. In the NEC, he recorded a fourth-place finish at Spa, and added a twelfth at Zolder to wind up 25th in the standings. In the UK Winter Series, Webb finished fourth overall in the four-race series, finishing on the podium at Rockingham. A retirement in the second race cost him a top-three championship spot. Finally, he finished as runner-up to team-mate Calado in the Portuguese Winter Series, with the two taking all four victories, Calado with three and Webb with one.

In 2009, Webb returned for a second season in Formula Renault UK. Consistency was the key for Webb, as he finished all but one race of the season, winning two races at Brands Hatch and at Silverstone. Webb was never outside the top-five in the championship standings, leading the championship after fourteen races before falling behind Dean Smith and Calado later in the season. Webb achieved ten podiums over the course of the season. He also made his first foray into the Eurocup, taking part in the rounds in Barcelona and at Le Mans.

=== Formula Three ===
For the 2010 season, Webb continued to drive for Fortec, but stepped up to compete in the British Formula 3 Championship. Webb finished third in the championship with three wins, fourteen podium finishes, and four fastest laps.

=== Formula Renault 3.5 ===
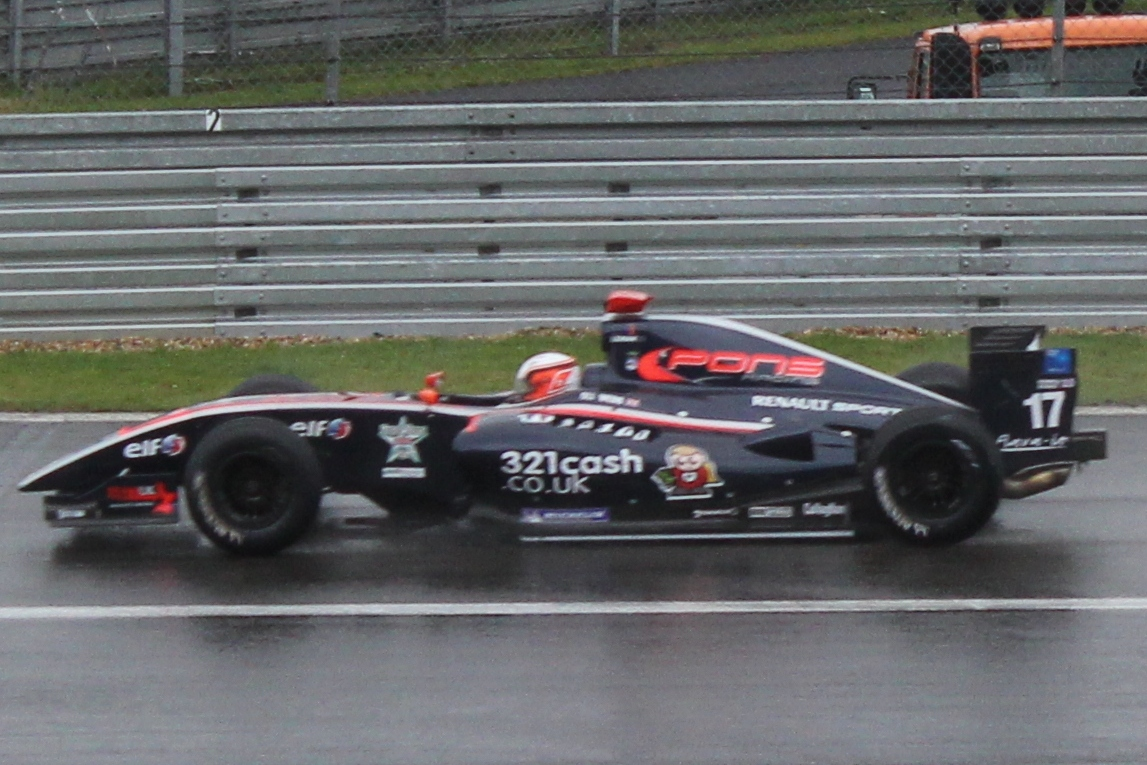
Oliver Webb at the 2011 Nürburgring World series by Renault round

For 2011, Webb signed with the Spanish Pons Racing team to race in Formula Renault 3.5. He finished 21st in the championship with five points finishes, scoring a best result of sixth in the final race at the Circuit de Catalunya.

Webb returned to the series in 2013 with Fortec Motorsport. Despite previously saying that he was not expecting to race single-seaters in 2014, it was announced that he would be returning to Pons Racing to race in Formula Renault 3.5 in 2014.

=== Indy Lights ===
Webb made his debut in the American Firestone Indy Lights series at the 2011 double-header at Edmonton for Jensen MotorSport. Webb finished on the podium in third in the first attrition-filled race and finished fifth in the second. He rejoined the team for the race in Baltimore where he crashed out after running in the top-five and made his oval racing debut at the Las Vegas Motor Speedway season finale where he finished tenth.

Webb signed with Sam Schmidt Motorsports to compete in the 2012 Indy Lights season. Webb finished seventh in points and won the pole and finished on the podium in third place at Belle Isle, his best finish.

=== European Le Mans Series ===
In March 2014, it was announced that Webb would join Signatech to participate in their attempt to defend their LMP2 title alongside Nelson Panciatici and Paul-Loup Chatin, following a last-minute deal to race the 24 Hours of Daytona with OAK Racing. Oliver won the championship overall with wins and poles.

=== World Endurance championship ===
Webb made his debut in the championship in 2015, where he drove for Team SARD-Morand.

== Outside racing ==
On 17 November 2019, Webb was announced as a W Motors Brand Ambassador and took part in the company's first track experience two days later. He will drive at W Motors events and assist in the development of their upcoming supercar.

On 10 October 2020, Webb drove a Shelby SuperCars (SSC) Tuatara in an attempt to set a new production car top speed record, hitting a claimed VMAX of 331.15 mph (532 km/h) and a two-way average of 316.11 mph (508 km/h) on a seven-mile stretch of closed road just outside of Las Vegas on State Route 160. Following an online controversy over the accuracy of the claimed speeds, SSC have stated that they will re-run the record attempt.

== Racing record ==
=== Career summary ===
Season	Series	Team	Races	Wins	Poles	F/Laps	Podiums	Points	Position
2005	T Cars	Graham Hathaway Engineering	?	?	?	?	?	?	?
2005	T Cars Autumn Trophy	Graham Hathaway Engineering	?	?	?	?	?	117	**2nd**
2006	T Cars	Graham Hathaway Engineering	20	3	3	?	11	133	**3rd**
2007	Formula BMW UK	Carlin Motorsport	18	0	0	0	0	406	9th
2007	Formula Renault UK Winter Cup	Fortec Motorsport	4	0	0	0	0	29	15th
2008	Formula Renault UK	Fortec Motorsport	20	0	0	0	0	267	8th
2008	Formula Renault 2.0 NEC	Fortec Motorsport	4	0	0	0	0	25	27th
2008	Formula Renault UK Winter Cup	Fortec Motorsport	4	0	0	0	0	64	4th
2008	Portuguese Formula Renault 2.0 Winter Series	Fortec Motorsport	4	1	1	0	1	28	**2nd**
2009	Formula Renault UK	Fortec Motorsport	20	2	0	2	10	419†	**3rd**
2009	Eurocup Formula Renault 2.0	Fortec Motorsport	4	0	0	0	0	0	29th
2010	British Formula 3 International Series	Fortec Motorsport	30	3	4	4	14	250	**3rd**
2010	Macau Grand Prix	Fortec Motorsport	1	0	0	0	0	N/A	18th
2011	Formula Renault 3.5 Series	Pons Racing	17	0	0	0	0	17	21st
2011	Indy Lights	Jensen MotorSport	4	0	0	0	1	104	18th
2012	Indy Lights	Sam Schmidt Motorsports	12	0	1	0	1	310	7th
2013	Formula Renault 3.5 Series	Fortec Motorsports	16	0	0	0	0	27	15th
2013	British GT Championship – GT3	Fortec Motorsports	1	0	0	0	0	0	NC
2013	FIA GT Series	Fortec Motorsports	2	0	0	0	0	0	NC†
2014	Formula Renault 3.5 Series	Pons Racing	5	0	0	0	0	0	26th
2014	European Le Mans Series – LMP2	Signatech Alpine	5	1	0	0	3	78	**1st**
2014	24 Hours of Le Mans – LMP2	Signatech Alpine	1	0	0	0	0	N/A	**3rd**
2014	United SportsCar Championship – Prototype	OAK Racing	1	0	0	0	0	26	56th
2015	FIA World Endurance Championship – LMP2	Team SARD-Morand	7	0	0	0	1	70	7th
2015	24 Hours of Le Mans – LMP2	Team SARD-Morand	1	0	0	0	0	N/A	DNF
2015	24H Series – A6	Black Falcon							
2015–16	Asian Le Mans Series – LMP2	Race Performance	2	0	0	0	2	33	5th
2016	FIA World Endurance Championship – LMP1	ByKolles Racing Team	9	0	0	0	0	19.5	17th
2016	24 Hours of Le Mans – LMP1	ByKolles Racing Team	1	0	0	0	0	N/A	DNF
2016	24H Series – A6	Black Falcon							
2017	FIA World Endurance Championship – LMP1	ByKolles Racing Team	4	0	0	0	0	8.5	30th
2017	24 Hours of Le Mans – LMP1	ByKolles Racing Team	1	0	0	0	0	N/A	DNF
2017	Blancpain GT Series Endurance Cup	Strakka Racing	2	0	0	0	0	4	38th
2017	Blancpain GT Series Endurance Cup – Pro-Am	Strakka Racing	1	0	0	0	0	0	NC
2017	Intercontinental GT Challenge	Strakka Racing	1	0	0	0	0	0	NC
2017	24H Series – SPX	Leipert Motorsport							
2018	24H GT Series – SPX	Leipert Motorsport							
2018	24 Hours of Le Mans – LMP1	ByKolles Racing Team	1	0	0	0	0	N/A	DNF
2018–19	FIA World Endurance Championship – LMP1	ByKolles Racing Team	7	0	0	0	0	22.5	17th
2019	TitansRX International Europe Series	N/A	8	0	0	0	0	80	10th
2019	24 Hours of Le Mans – LMP1	ByKolles Racing Team	1	0	0	0	0	N/A	DNF
2019–20	Jaguar I-Pace eTrophy	Jaguar VIP Car	2	0	0	0	0	0	NC†
2019–20	FIA World Endurance Championship – LMP1	ByKolles Racing Team	2	0	0	0	0	0	NC†
2020	24H GT Series – 991	race:pro motorsport	1	0	0	0	0	18	8th
2021	FIA World Endurance Championship – LMP2	ARC Bratislava	4	0	0	0	0	7	27th
2021	Pure ETCR Championship	Romeo Ferraris/M1RA	4	0	0	0	0	177	9th
2022	GT Cup Championship	Greystone GT	21	3	0	0	4	295	13th
2022	British GT Championship – GT3	Greystone GT	1	0	0	0	0	0	NC†
2022	British Endurance Championship – Class B	Mtech	1	1	1	1	1	0	NC†
2022	Indian Racing League	Bangalore Speedsters	1	0	0	0	0	0	NC
2023	British GT Championship – GT3	Greystone GT	7	0	0	0	0	0	NC
2023	McLaren Trophy Europe – Artura Trophy	Greystone GT							
2023	Indian Racing League	Bangalore Speedsters	3	0	1	0	2	58‡	5th‡
2023-24	Middle East Trophy – TCR	Simpson Motorsport							
2024	International GT Open	Greystone GT	9	0	0	0	0	0	61st
2024	International GT Open – Pro-Am	Greystone GT	3	0	0	0	0	0	21st*
2024	McLaren Trophy Europe – 570S Trophy	Greystone GT							
2024	British GT Championship – GT3	Greystone GT	1	0	0	0	0	0	NC†
2024	Masters Endurance Legends – GT	JMB Classic	2	1	0	2	2	10	**3rd***
2025	GT Winter Series – Cup 3	Greystone GT							
2025	British GT Championship – GT3	Greystone GT	2	0	0	0	0	0	NC
2025	GT Cup Open Europe	Greystone GT							
2025	McLaren Trophy Europe	Greystone GT							
2026	McLaren Trophy America	Greystone GT							
2026	International GT Open	Greystone GT	9	0	0	0	0	0	62nd

^{‡} Team standings. ^{†} As Webb was a guest driver he was ineligible to score points. ^{*} Season still in progress.

=== Complete Formula Renault 2.0 NEC results ===
(key) (Races in bold indicate pole position) (Races in italics indicate fastest lap)

Year	Entrant	1	2	3	4	5	6	7	8	9	10	11	12	13	14	15	16	DC	Points
2008	Fortec Motorsport	HOC; 1	HOC; 2	ZAN; 1	ZAN; 2	ALA; 1	ALA; 2	OSC; 1	OSC; 2	ASS; 1	ASS; 2	ZOL; 1; 12	ZOL; 2 Ret	NÜR; 1	NÜR; 2	SPA; 1; 5	SPA; 2; 4	27th	25

=== Complete Eurocup Formula Renault 2.0 results ===
(key) (Races in bold indicate pole position; races in italics indicate fastest lap)

Year	Entrant	1	2	3	4	5	6	7	8	9	10	11	12	13	14	DC	Points
2009	Fortec Motorsports	CAT; 1; 13	CAT; 2; 11	SPA; 1	SPA; 2	HUN; 1	HUN; 2	SIL; 1	SIL; 2	LMS; 1; 21	LMS; 2; 21	NÜR; 1	NÜR; 2	ALC; 1	ALC; 2	29th	0

=== Complete Formula Renault 3.5 Series results ===
(key) (Races in bold indicate pole position) (Races in italics indicate fastest lap)

Year	Team	1	2	3	4	5	6	7	8	9	10	11	12	13	14	15	16	17	Pos	Points
2011	Pons Racing	ALC; 1; 11	ALC; 2; 17	SPA; 1 Ret	SPA; 2; 18	MNZ; 1; 9	MNZ; 2; 11	MON; 1 Ret	NÜR; 1; 16	NÜR; 2; 17	HUN; 1; 19	HUN; 2; 7	SIL; 1; 7	SIL; 2; 12	LEC; 1; 11	LEC; 2; 10	CAT; 1 Ret	CAT; 2; 6	21st	17
2013	Fortec Motorsports	MNZ; 1; 4	MNZ; 2; 9	ALC; 1; 11	ALC; 2; 17	MON; 1; 11	SPA; 1; 12	SPA; 2; 9	MSC; 1; 9	MSC; 2; 7	RBR; 1 DNS	RBR; 2; 16	HUN; 1; 16	HUN; 2; 10	LEC; 1; 13	LEC; 2; 22	CAT; 1; 10	CAT; 2; 10	15th	27
2014	Pons Racing	MNZ; 1; 12	MNZ; 2; 14	ALC; 1 Ret	ALC; 2; 13	MON; 1; 12	SPA; 1	SPA; 2	MSC; 1	MSC; 2	NÜR; 1	NÜR; 2	HUN; 1	HUN; 2	LEC; 1	LEC; 2	JER; 1	JER; 2	26th	0

=== American open–wheel racing results ===
(key)

==== Indy Lights ====
Year	Team	1	2	3	4	5	6	7	8	9	10	11	12	13	14	Rank	Points	Ref
2011	Jensen MotorSport	STP	ALA	LBH	INDY	MIL	IOW	TOR	EDM; 3	EDM; 5	TRO	NHM	BAL; 11	KTY	LVS; 10	**18th**	**104**	
2012	Sam Schmidt Motorsports	STP; 4	ALA; 13	LBH; 6	INDY; 15	**DET**; 3	MIL; 12	IOW; 12	TOR; 5	EDM; 4	TRO; 5	BAL; 6	FON; 8			**7th**	**310**	

=== Complete British GT Championship results ===
(key) (Races in bold indicate pole position) (Races in italics indicate fastest lap)

Year	Team	Car	Class	1	2	3	4	5	6	7	8	9	10	DC	Points
2013	Fortec Motorsports	Mercedes-Benz SLS AMG GT3	GT3	OUL; 1	OUL; 2	ROC; 1 Ret	SIL; 1	SNE; 1	SNE; 2	BRH; 1	ZAN; 1	ZAN; 2	DON; 1	NC	0
2022	Greystone GT	McLaren 720S GT3	GT3	OUL; 1	OUL; 2	SIL; 1	DON; 1	SNE; 1	SNE; 2	SPA; 1; 12	BRH; 1	DON; 1		NC†	0†
2023	Greystone GT	McLaren 720S GT3	GT3	OUL; 1; 15	OUL; 2; 20	SIL; 1; 18	DON; 1; 11	SNE; 1; 19	SNE; 2; 28	ALG; 1; 15	BRH; 1	DON; 1		NC	0
2024	Greystone GT	McLaren 720S GT3 Evo	GT3	OUL; 1	OUL; 2	SIL; 1	DON; 1	SPA; 1; 28	SNE; 1	SNE; 2	DON; 1	BRH; 1		NC†	0†
2025	Greystone GT	McLaren 720S GT3 Evo	GT3	DON; 1; 12	SIL; 1 Ret	OUL; 1 WD	OUL; 2 WD	SPA; 1 WD	SNE; 1	SNE; 2	BRH; 1	DON; 1		NC	0

^{†} As Webb was a guest driver he was ineligible to score points.

=== Complete European Le Mans Series results ===
Year	Entrant	Class	Chassis	Engine	1	2	3	4	5	Rank	Points
2014	Signatech Alpine	LMP2	Alpine (Oreca 03)	Nissan VK45DE 4.5 L V8	SIL; 5	IMO; 3	RBR; 1	LEC; 2	EST; 5	1st	78

=== Complete 24 Hours of Le Mans results ===
Year	Team	Co-Drivers	Car	Class	Laps	Pos.	Class Pos.
2014	(France) Signatech-Alpine	(France) Paul-Loup Chatin (France) Nelson Panciatici	Alpine A450b-Nissan	LMP2	355	7th	**3rd**
2015	(Switzerland) Team SARD Morand	(France) Pierre Ragues (Switzerland) Zoël Amberg	Morgan LMP2 Evo-SARD	LMP2	162	DNF	DNF
2016	(Austria) ByKolles Racing Team	(Germany) Pierre Kaffer (Switzerland) Simon Trummer	CLM P1/01-AER	LMP1	206	DNF	DNF
2017	(Austria) ByKolles Racing Team	(Austria) Dominik Kraihamer (Italy) Marco Bonanomi	ENSO CLM P1/01-Nismo	LMP1	7	DNF	DNF
2018	(Austria) ByKolles Racing Team	(Austria) Dominik Kraihamer (France) Tom Dillmann	ENSO CLM P1/01-Nismo	LMP1	65	DNF	DNF
2019	(Austria) ByKolles Racing Team	(Italy) Paolo Ruberti (France) Tom Dillmann	ENSO CLM P1/01-Gibson	LMP1	163	DNF	DNF
2020	(Austria) ByKolles Racing Team	(Canada) Bruno Spengler (France) Tom Dillmann	ENSO CLM P1/01-Gibson	LMP1	97	DNF	DNF
2021	(Slovakia) ARC Bratislava	(Slovakia) Matej Konôpka (Slovakia) Miro Konôpka	Oreca 07-Gibson	LMP2	342	24th	15th
2021	(Slovakia) ARC Bratislava	(Slovakia) Matej Konôpka (Slovakia) Miro Konôpka	Oreca 07-Gibson	LMP2 Pro-Am	342	24th	6th

=== Complete United SportsCar Championship results ===
(key) (Races in bold indicate pole position) (Races in italics indicate fastest lap)

Year	Team	Class	Make	Engine	1	2	3	4	5	6	7	8	9	10	11	Pos.	Points	Ref
2014	OAK Racing	P	Morgan LMP2	Nissan VK45DE 4.5 L V8	DAY; 6	SEB	LBH	LGA	DET	WGL	MOS	IMS	ELK	COA	PET	45th	26	

=== Complete FIA World Endurance Championship results ===
Year	Entrant	Class	Car	Engine	1	2	3	4	5	6	7	8	9	Rank	Points
2015	Team SARD Morand	LMP2	Morgan LMP2 Evo	SARD (Judd) 3.6 L V8	SIL	SPA; 2	LMS; Ret	NÜR; 4	COA; 5	FUJ; 5	SHA; 4	BHR; 6		7th	70
2016	ByKolles Racing Team	LMP1	CLM P1/01	AER P60 2.4 L Turbo V6	SIL; 14	SPA; 6	LMS; Ret	NÜR; Ret	MEX; 14	COA; 11	FUJ; Ret	SHA; 7	BHR; 8	17th	19.5
2017	ByKolles Racing Team	LMP1	ENSO CLM P1/01	Nismo VRX30A 3.0 L Turbo V6	SIL; Ret	SPA; 6	LMS; Ret	NÜR; 14	MEX	COA	FUJ	SHA	BHR	30th	8.5
2018–19	ByKolles Racing Team	LMP1	ENSO CLM P1/01	Nismo VRX30A 3.0 L Turbo V6	SPA; 4	LMS; Ret	SIL; Ret	FUJ; 5	SHA; Ret	SEB				17th	22.5
2018–19	ByKolles Racing Team	LMP1	ENSO CLM P1/01	Gibson GL458 4.5 L V8							SPA; 14	LMS; Ret		17th	22.5
2019–20	ByKolles Racing Team	LMP1	ENSO CLM P1/01	Gibson GL458 4.5 L V8	SIL	FUJ	SHA	BHR	COA	SPA; 11	LMS; Ret	BHR		NC†	0†
2021	ARC Bratislava	LMP2	Ligier JS P217	Gibson GK428 4.2 L V8	SPA	ALG; 11	MNZ; 10							27th	7
2021	ARC Bratislava	LMP2	Oreca 07	Gibson GK428 4.2 L V8				LMS; 9	BHR; 10	BHR				27th	7

^{†} As Webb was a guest driver he was ineligible to score points.

=== Complete Indian Racing League results ===
(key) (Races in bold indicate pole position) (Races in italics indicate fastest lap)

Year	Franchise	1	2	3	4	5	6	7	8	9	10	11	12	Pos.	Pts
2022	Bangalore Speedsters	HYD1; 1 C	HYD1; 2 C	HYD1; 3 C	IRU1; 1	IRU1; 2	IRU1; 3	IRU2; 1	IRU2; 2 DNS	IRU2; 3 Ret	HYD2; 1 DNS	HYD2; 2	HYD2; 3 DNS	NC	0
2023‡	Bangalore Speedsters	IRU1; 1; 4	IRU1; 2	IRU2; 1; 2	IRU2; 2	IRU3; 1	**IRU3**; **2**; 2							5th	58

‡ Standings based on entry points, not individual drivers.

Sporting positions
Preceded by Nelson Panciatici; Pierre Ragues	European Le Mans Series; Champion; 2014; With: Paul-Loup Chatin & Nelson Panciatici	Succeeded by Jon Lancaster; Björn Wirdheim; Gary Hirsch
