= Pantera RX6 =

Rallycross Supercar produced by MJP Racing

Overview
- Manufacturer: MJP Racing
- Production: 2018–present
- Assembly: Vienna, Austria

Body and chassis
- Class: Rallycross Supercar (C)
- Body style: varies (6 different bodies available)
- Layout: F4 layout

Powertrain
- Engine: 2.3 L EcoBoost I4
- Transmission: 5-speed seq shift manual transmission

Dimensions
- Wheelbase: 103.0 in (2,616 mm)
- Length: dependent on body kit
- Width: 74.7 in (1,898 mm)
- Height: dependent on body kit
- Curb weight: dependent on body kit

The Pantera RX6 is a Rallycross Supercar produced by MJP Racing. Production of the RX6 began in 2018 for a new one-make class of rallycross racing known as the Titan class (making its debut in TitansRX International Europe Series), making the RX6 the second rallycross car designed specifically for a new class, after the RX2 car designed for the RX2 class by Olsbergs MSE.

The car was designed to combat the increasing costs of maintaining a supercar in Rallycross by supplying an affordable, easy to maintain car which is race ready. The car has also been designed to make it easier for female and disabled drivers to race with several adaptation options.

== Engine and drivetrain ==
At present the Pantera RX6 uses a 2.3L EcoBoost engine from a sixth generation Ford Mustang, tuned to be suited to rallycross by racing specialists Pipo Moteurs, with bespoke drivetrain from Unic Transmissions. As the Pantera RX6 is designed to compete in a one-make racing class, there is only one type of engine at present with no variants.

Petrol engine
Model	Engine	Displacement	Power	Torque	Note	Year
Mustang EcoBoost	I4	2,345 cc	537 PS (395 kW; 530 hp) @6800rpm	750 N⋅m (553 lb⋅ft) @5000rpm		2018

== Bodies ==
As of early-2019, the following body kits are compatible with the Pantera RX6:

Manufacturer	Model
(Germany) Audi	Audi A1 (8X)
(United States) Ford	Ford Focus (RS)
(South Korea) Hyundai	Hyundai i30 (PD)
(Germany) Mercedes-Benz	Mercedes-Benz A-Class (W177)
(Austria) MJP	none (bespoke body kit available to Titans-RX competitors)
(France) Peugeot	Peugeot 308 (T9)

== Race maintenance ==
At the car's launch conference in Vienna in 2018, the car's creator, Max Pucher, emphasised the car's key feature being its ease of maintenance, stating that each car could last 'two to three seasons depending on use', before requiring a 'full rebuild after approximately 3000km'. Since the car has been specifically designed for easy maintenance, certain limits were added to the car, such as the ECU being locked to prevent modification of the car's engine mapping.

In a later interview, Pucher continued that these limitations and settings (including a 20% safety margin in torque limits) will allow a race team 'to service one car per race weekend with one chief and a junior mechanic with no need for race, engine or electronics engineers', as technical support is available at all Titans-RX races and provided as a service by the racing series.

As part of the Titans-RX support service, spare parts will be available from all MJP Racing service trucks, excluding body kits, with wheels, tyres and fuel also being supplied at each race event, covered by an initial fee at the start of the Titans-RX Season.

== See also ==
- GRC Rallycross
- MJP Racing Team Austria
- TCR Touring Car
