= 2025 TC France Series =

French car racing championship

The 2025 Championnat de France FFSA Tourisme - TC France season was the fifth season of the French FFSA Tourisme Championship, a sports car and touring car championship created and organised by the Stephane Ratel Organisation (SRO). The season began on 18 April in Nogaro and finished on 5 October at Paul Ricard.

== Calendar ==
Round	Circuit	Date
1	Circuit Paul Armagnac, Nogaro, France	18–21 April
2	Circuit de Dijon-Prenois, Prenois, France	9–11 May
3	Circuit de Spa-Francorchamps, Stavelot, Belgium	20–22 June
4	Circuit de Nevers Magny-Cours, Magny-Cours, France	1–3 August
5	Circuit de Lédenon, Lédenon, France	12–14 September
6	Circuit Paul Ricard, Le Castellet, France	3–5 October

== Entry list ==
Team	Car	No.	Drivers	Rounds
TCR entries
(France) JSB Compétition	Hyundai Elantra N TCR (2024)	8	(France) Julien Briché	1
(France) JSB Compétition	Hyundai Elantra N TCR	145	(France) Raphaël Fournier	All
(France) JSB Compétition	Hyundai Elantra N TCR	16	(France) Franck Salvi	2–3, 5–6
(Czech Republic) Janik Motorsport	Hyundai Elantra N TCR	16	(France) Franck Salvi	1
(France) SP Compétition	Cupra León VZ TCR	22	(France) Gilles Chauvin	All
(France) SP Compétition	Cupra León VZ TCR	34	(Belgium) Giovanni Scamardi	All
(France) SP Compétition	Cupra Leon Competición TCR	38	(France) Tom Pussier	All
(France) SP Compétition	Cupra Leon Competición TCR	71	(France) Stéphane Biajoux	6
(France) Team Leal Compétition	Volkswagen Golf GTI TCR	39	(France) Michel Leal	6
(France) Comte Racing Team	Cupra Leon Competición TCR	58	(France) Pierre Bredeaux	1–2
(France) Mirage Racing	Audi RS 3 LMS TCR	81	(France) Paul Avakian	6
(France) Mirage Racing	Audi RS 3 LMS TCR	81	(France) Jean-Jacques Ardilly	6
(France) Optimum Racing	Volkswagen Golf GTI TCR	999	(France) Jacques Paget	6
(France) Optimum Racing	Volkswagen Golf GTI TCR	999	(France) Maxence Passaquet	6
TC entries
(France) Team Pilote 69 by JSB	Peugeot 308 Racing Cup	3	(France) José Beltramelli	3–5
(France) Team Pilote 69 by JSB	Peugeot 308 Racing Cup	3	(France) Viny Beltramelli	5
(France) Team Pilote 69 by JSB	Peugeot 308 Racing Cup	10	(France) José Beltramelli	2
(France) Team Pilote 69 by JSB	Peugeot 308 Racing Cup	10	(France) Brady Beltramelli	2
(France) JSB Compétition	Peugeot 308 Racing Cup	7	(France) Florian Briché	All
(France) JSB Compétition	Peugeot 308 Racing Cup	20	(France) Théo Vidal	1, 5, 6
(France) JSB Compétition	Peugeot 308 Racing Cup	20	(France) Martial Camurac	1, 3
(France) JSB Compétition	Peugeot 308 Racing Cup	20	(France) Léo Renet	6
(France) JSB Compétition	Peugeot 308 Racing Cup	69	(France) Rodolphe Spitz	2–4
(France) Boreau Team Sport by JSB	Peugeot 308 Racing Cup	17	(France) Colin Boreau	1–4
(France) Boreau Team Sport by JSB	Peugeot 308 Racing Cup	17	(France) Franck Labescat	1–3
(France) eXigence Motorsport	Mini JCW Challenge	4	(France) Benjamin Breton	4
(France) eXigence Motorsport	Mini JCW Challenge	72	(Switzerland) Christophe Gaillard	1–2
(France) STR	Ginetta G50 Cup	9	(France) Eric Oddos-Piantone	3
(France) 2RT	Peugeot 208 TC	49	(France) Kévin Ropars	1, 3–4, 6
(France) RJC Racing by Touzery	Seat Léon Cup Racer	54	(France) Rudy Burot	3
(France) Touzery Compétition	Peugeot 308 Racing Cup	59	(France) François Chevalier	3
(France) JMRP Racing	Peugeot 308 Racing Cup	276	(France) Guillaume Lentier	2, 6
TCA entries
(France) Optimum Racing	Renault Clio Cup IV	21	(France) Julien Pellegrini	4
(France) JSB Compétition	Renault Clio Cup IV	24	(France) Yannis Lafon	All
(France) JSB Compétition	Renault Clio Cup IV	47	(France) Martial Camurac	5–6
(France) Team Leal Compétition	Renault Clio Cup IV	26	(France) Michel Béziat	3
(France) Team Leal Compétition	Renault Clio Cup IV	26	(France) Bastien Girard	3
(France) Team Leal Compétition	Renault Clio Cup IV	33	(France) Claude Carlos	1, 3–6
(France) Team Leal Compétition	Renault Clio Cup IV	33	(France) Julien Carlos	1, 3–6
(France) Team Leal Compétition	Renault Clio Cup IV	39	(France) Michel Leal	5
(France) Team Leal Compétition	Renault Clio Cup IV	39	(France) Thomas Leal	5
(France) Team Leal Compétition	Renault Clio Cup IV	55	(France) Patrick Pujol	3–6
(France) Team Leal Compétition	Renault Clio Cup IV	95	(France) Lubin Henry	All
(France) Team Leal Compétition	Renault Clio Cup IV	95	(France) Christophe Henry	1, 3–6
(France) Team Leal Compétition	Renault Clio Cup IV	95	(France) Michel Leal	2
(France) Fox Racing Team	Renault Clio Cup IV	26	(France) Michel Béziat	4–5
(France) Fox Racing Team	Renault Clio Cup IV	26	(France) Bastien Girard	5
(France) Team CDRS	Renault Clio Cup V	51	(France) Cyril Melet	1
(France) Team CDRS	Renault Clio Cup V	51	(France) Christophe Pereira	1
(France) JG Compétition	Renault Clio Cup IV	55	(France) Patrick Pujol	1
(France) Sport Cup 88	Renault Clio Cup III	88	(France) François Samy	1
(France) Escot Competition	Renault Clio Cup III	93	(France) Jérémy Escot	4
(France) Escot Competition	Renault Clio Cup III	93	(France) François Samy	4
(France) ADWShop Motorsport	Mini Cooper R56 MCS-R	115	(France) Mickaël Boisdur	1–4, 6
(France) ADWShop Motorsport	Mini Cooper R56 MCS-R	122	(France) Martin Scarnière	All
(France) ADWShop Motorsport	Mini Cooper R56 MCS-R	122	(France) Victor Benmoussa	2–4
(France) ADWShop Motorsport	Mini Cooper R56 MCS-R	122	(France) Mickaël Boisdur	5
(France) ADWShop Motorsport	Mini Cooper R56 MCS-R	122	(France) Richard Gino	6
(France) ADWShop Motorsport	Mini Cooper R56 MCS-R	126	(France) Victor Benmoussa	6
TCA Light entries
(France) Team Montbéliard	Peugeot 208 Racing Cup	1	(France) Lucas Guichard	3
(France) Team Montbéliard	Peugeot 208 Racing Cup	6	(France) Vincent Treillaud	3
(France) Team Montbéliard	Peugeot 208 Racing Cup	15	(France) Elvina Savet	3
(France) Team Montbéliard	Peugeot 208 Racing Cup	98	(France) Romain Gregori	3
(France) Team Montbéliard	Peugeot 208 Racing Cup	99	(France) Max Ciciliani	3
(France) LB Compétition	Peugeot 208 Racing Cup	1	(France) Lucas Guichard	4–5
(France) LB Compétition	Peugeot 208 Racing Cup	2	(France) Léo Guichard	5
(France) JSB Compétition	Peugeot 208 Racing Cup	8	(France) Mathis Briché	3–6
(France) JSB Compétition	Peugeot 208 Racing Cup	19	(France) Léo Berson	All
(France) JSB Compétition	Peugeot 208 Racing Cup	19	(France) Jean-Patrick Caillet	2, 4
(France) JSB Compétition	Peugeot 208 Racing Cup	25	(France) Karel Eyoum	All
(France) JSB Compétition	Peugeot 208 Racing Cup	44	(France) Arthur Salvi	1–2
(France) JSB Compétition	Peugeot 208 Racing Cup	44	(France) Mathis Briché	2
(France) First Racing	Peugeot 208 Racing Cup	14	(France) Vincent Vevres	1–2
(France) Sport Auto Racing	Peugeot 208 Racing Cup	36	(France) Margot Carvalhido	1, 3–4, 6
(France) Sport Auto Racing	Peugeot 208 Racing Cup	36	(France) Frederic Rondeau	1, 3–4, 6
(France) Sport Auto Racing	Peugeot 208 Racing Cup	37	(France) Sylvain Gonzales	1
(France) Sport Auto Racing	Peugeot 208 Racing Cup	37	(Switzerland) Yohann Segala	2
(France) Barinsky Automobiles	Peugeot 208 Racing Cup	52	(France) Marvin Barinsky	4–6
(France) Team CDRS	Mini One 1.5T	64	(France) Jacques Tillos	1
(France) Team CDRS	Mini One 1.5T	64	(France) François Tillos	1
(France) Comte Racing Team	Peugeot 208 Racing Cup	73	(France) Pierre Lyps	3
(France) Comte Racing Team	Peugeot 208 Racing Cup	73	(France) Hervé Sivignon	3
(France) Comte Racing Team	Peugeot 208 Racing Cup	842	(France) Tanguy Weiss	All
(France) Comte Racing Team	Peugeot 208 Racing Cup	842	(France) Nicolas Roumezy	All
(France) T2CM	Peugeot 208 Racing Cup	77	(France) Timothée Carrée	2, 4, 6
(France) 2RT	Peugeot 208 Racing Cup	212	(France) Matthieu Collin	2, 4, 6
(France) Beyond Virtual by 2RT	Peugeot 208 Racing Cup	712	(France) Sébastien Bortot	1–2, 4–6
GT Light entries
(France) Team CDRS	Ligier JS2 R	5	(France) Stéphane Codet	1–3, 5–6
(France) Team CDRS	Ligier JS2 R	23	(France) Guillaume Huber	2, 6
(France) Team CDRS	Ligier JS2 R	29	(France) David Chiche	All
(France) Team CDRS	Ligier JS2 R	40	(France) Julien Nougaret	1, 6
(France) Team CDRS	Ligier JS2 R	40	(France) Dorian Duthil	1, 6
(France) STR	Ginetta G50 Cup	9	(France) Eric Oddos-Piantone	4
(France) STR	Ginetta G55 Supercup	13	(France) Alexandre Ducos	1
(France) STR	Ginetta G55 Supercup	13	(France) Guillaume Rousseau	1
(France) TCP Racing by STR	Ginetta G55 Supercup	28	(France) Thierry Pellerzi	1, 3–6
(France) TCP Racing by STR	Ginetta G55 Supercup	28	(France) Olivier Hulot	3, 6
(France) Chazel Technologie Course	Alpine A110 Cup	11	(Belgium) Nicolas Guelinckx	3
(France) Duc Racing	Ligier JS2 R	27	(France) Romain Duqueine	5–6
(France) Duc Racing	Ligier JS2 R	27	(France) Vincent Duqueine	5–6
(France) J'Nov Auto Racing by JSB	Ligier JS2 R	79	(France) Laurent Joubert	All
Guest entries
(United States) Stellantis Customer Racing	Peugeot 208 FR6	208	(France) Jimmy Clairet	6
(United States) Stellantis Customer Racing	Peugeot 208 FR6	208	(France) Teddy Clairet	6

== Results ==
Bold indicates the overall winner.

Round		Circuit	Pole position	TCR Winners	TC Winners	TCA Winners	TCA Light Winners	GT Light Winners
1	R1	(France) Circuit Paul Armagnac	(France) No. 58 Comte Racing Team	**(France) No. 34 SP Compétition**	(France) No. 49 2RT	(France) No. 88 Sport Cup 88	(France) No. 14 First Racing	(France) No. 13 STR
1	R1	(France) Circuit Paul Armagnac	(France) Pierre Bredeaux	**(Belgium) Giovanni Scamardi**	(France) Kévin Ropars	(France) François Samy	(France) Vincent Vevres	(France) Guillaume Rousseau
1	R2	(France) Circuit Paul Armagnac		**(France) No. 34 SP Compétition**	(France) No. 7 JSB Compétition	(France) No. 88 Sport Cup 88	(France) No. 14 First Racing	(France) No. 29 Team CDRS
1	R2	(France) Circuit Paul Armagnac		**(Belgium) Giovanni Scamardi**	(France) Florian Briché	(France) François Samy	(France) Vincent Vevres	(France) David Chiche
1	R3	(France) Circuit Paul Armagnac	(France) No. 34 SP Compétition	**(France) No. 145 JSB Compétition**	(France) No. 7 JSB Compétition	(France) No. 115 ADWShop Motorsport	(France) No. 19 JSB Compétition	(France) No. 13 STR
1	R3	(France) Circuit Paul Armagnac	(Belgium) Giovanni Scamardi	**(France) Raphaël Fournier**	(France) Florian Briché	(France) Mickaël Boisdur	(France) Léo Berson	(France) Guillaume Rousseau
1	R4	(France) Circuit Paul Armagnac		**(France) No. 34 SP Compétition**	(France) No. 49 2RT	(France) No. 88 Sport Cup 88	(France) No. 14 First Racing	(France) No. 29 Team CDRS
1	R4	(France) Circuit Paul Armagnac		**(Belgium) Giovanni Scamardi**	(France) Kévin Ropars	(France) François Samy	(France) Vincent Vevres	(France) David Chiche
2	R1	(France) Circuit de Dijon-Prenois	(France) No. 145 JSB Compétition	**(France) No. 145 JSB Compétition**	(France) No. 7 JSB Compétition	(France) No. 115 ADWShop Motorsport	(France) No. 19 JSB Compétition	(France) No. 29 Team CDRS
2	R1	(France) Circuit de Dijon-Prenois	(France) Raphaël Fournier	**(France) Raphaël Fournier**	(France) Florian Briché	(France) Mickaël Boisdur	(France) Léo Berson	(France) David Chiche
2	R2	(France) Circuit de Dijon-Prenois		**(France) No. 145 JSB Compétition**	(France) No. 7 JSB Compétition	(France) No. 122 ADWShop Motorsport	(France) No. 25 JSB Compétition	(France) No. 29 Team CDRS
2	R2	(France) Circuit de Dijon-Prenois		**(France) Raphaël Fournier**	(France) Florian Briché	(France) Martin Scarnière	(France) Karel Eyoum	(France) David Chiche
2	R3	(France) Circuit de Dijon-Prenois	(France) No. 145 JSB Compétition	**(France) No. 34 SP Compétition**	(France) No. 69 JSB Compétition	(France) No. 33 Team Leal Compétition	(France) No. 19 JSB Compétition	(France) No. 5 Team CDRS
2	R3	(France) Circuit de Dijon-Prenois	(France) Raphaël Fournier	**(Belgium) Giovanni Scamardi**	(France) Rodolphe Spitz	(France) Claude Carlos	(France) Léo Berson	(France) Stéphane Codet
2	R4	(France) Circuit de Dijon-Prenois		**(France) No. 145 JSB Compétition**	(France) No. 7 JSB Compétition	(France) No. 115 ADWShop Motorsport	(France) No. 25 JSB Compétition	(France) No. 29 Team CDRS
2	R4	(France) Circuit de Dijon-Prenois		**(France) Raphaël Fournier**	(France) Florian Briché	(France) Mickaël Boisdur	(France) Karel Eyoum	(France) David Chiche
3	R1	(Belgium) Circuit de Spa-Francorchamps	(France) No. 145 JSB Compétition	**(France) No. 34 SP Compétition**	(France) No. 7 JSB Compétition	(France) No. 115 ADWShop Motorsport	(France) No. 25 JSB Compétition	(France) No. 5 Team CDRS
3	R1	(Belgium) Circuit de Spa-Francorchamps	(France) Raphaël Fournier	**(Belgium) Giovanni Scamardi**	(France) Florian Briché	(France) Mickaël Boisdur	(France) Karel Eyoum	(France) Stéphane Codet
3	R2	(Belgium) Circuit de Spa-Francorchamps		**(France) No. 34 SP Compétition**	(France) No. 7 JSB Compétition	(France) No. 115 ADWShop Motorsport	(France) No. 25 JSB Compétition	(France) No. 5 Team CDRS
3	R2	(Belgium) Circuit de Spa-Francorchamps		**(Belgium) Giovanni Scamardi**	(France) Florian Briché	(France) Mickaël Boisdur	(France) Karel Eyoum	(France) Stéphane Codet
3	R3	(Belgium) Circuit de Spa-Francorchamps	(France) No. 34 SP Compétition	**(France) No. 34 SP Compétition**	(France) No. 7 JSB Compétition	(France) No. 115 ADWShop Motorsport	(France) No. 25 JSB Compétition	(France) No. 5 Team CDRS
3	R3	(Belgium) Circuit de Spa-Francorchamps	(Belgium) Giovanni Scamardi	**(Belgium) Giovanni Scamardi**	(France) Florian Briché	(France) Mickaël Boisdur	(France) Karel Eyoum	(France) Stéphane Codet
3	R4	(Belgium) Circuit de Spa-Francorchamps		**(France) No. 34 SP Compétition**	(France) No. 7 JSB Compétition	(France) No. 115 ADWShop Motorsport	(France) No. 25 JSB Compétition	(France) No. 5 Team CDRS
3	R4	(Belgium) Circuit de Spa-Francorchamps		**(Belgium) Giovanni Scamardi**	(France) Florian Briché	(France) Mickaël Boisdur	(France) Karel Eyoum	(France) Stéphane Codet
4	R1	(France) Circuit de Nevers Magny-Cours	(France) No. 34 SP Compétition	(France) No. 22 SP Compétition	**(France) No. 7 JSB Compétition**	(France) No. 115 ADWShop Motorsport	(France) No. 25 JSB Compétition	(France) No. 29 Team CDRS
4	R1	(France) Circuit de Nevers Magny-Cours	(Belgium) Giovanni Scamardi	(France) Gilles Chauvin	**(France) Florian Briché**	(France) Mickaël Boisdur	(France) Karel Eyoum	(France) David Chiche
4	R2	(France) Circuit de Nevers Magny-Cours		**(France) No. 145 JSB Compétition**	(France) No. 7 JSB Compétition	(France) No. 115 ADWShop Motorsport	(France) No. 1 LB Compétition	(France) No. 29 Team CDRS
4	R2	(France) Circuit de Nevers Magny-Cours		**(France) Raphaël Fournier**	(France) Florian Briché	(France) Mickaël Boisdur	(France) Lucas Guichard	(France) David Chiche
4	R3	(France) Circuit de Nevers Magny-Cours	(France) No. 34 SP Compétition	**(France) No. 34 SP Compétition**	(France) No. 7 JSB Compétition	(France) No. 33 Team Leal Compétition	(France) No. 1 LB Compétition	(France) No. 79 J'Nov Auto Racing by JSB
4	R3	(France) Circuit de Nevers Magny-Cours	(Belgium) Giovanni Scamardi	**(Belgium) Giovanni Scamardi**	(France) Florian Briché	(France) Claude Carlos	(France) Lucas Guichard	(France) Laurent Joubert
4	R4	(France) Circuit de Nevers Magny-Cours		**(France) No. 34 SP Compétition**	(France) No. 49 2RT	(France) No. 33 Team Leal Compétition	(France) No. 25 JSB Compétition	(France) No. 29 Team CDRS
4	R4	(France) Circuit de Nevers Magny-Cours		**(Belgium) Giovanni Scamardi**	(France) Kévin Ropars	(France) Lubin Henry	(France) Karel Eyoum	(France) David Chiche
5	R1	(France) Circuit de Lédenon	(France) No. 145 JSB Compétition	**(France) No. 145 JSB Compétition**	(France) No. 49 2RT	(France) No. 122 ADWShop Motorsport	(France) No. 25 JSB Compétition	(France) No. 5 Team CDRS
5	R1	(France) Circuit de Lédenon	(France) Raphaël Fournier	**(France) Raphaël Fournier**	(France) Kévin Ropars	(France) Mickaël Boisdur	(France) Karel Eyoum	(France) Stéphane Codet
5	R2	(France) Circuit de Lédenon		**(France) No. 34 SP Compétition**	(France) No. 3 Team Pilote 69 by JSB	(France) No. 95 Team Leal Compétition	(France) No. 25 JSB Compétition	(France) No. 29 Team CDRS
5	R2	(France) Circuit de Lédenon		**(Belgium) Giovanni Scamardi**	(France) Beltramelli Viny	(France) Lubin Henry	(France) Karel Eyoum	(France) David Chiche
5	R3	(France) Circuit de Lédenon	(France) No. 145 JSB Compétition	**(France) No. 145 JSB Compétition**	(France) No. 49 2RT	(France) No. 33 Team Leal Compétition	(France) No. 1 LB Compétition	(France) No. 5 Team CDRS
5	R3	(France) Circuit de Lédenon	(France) Raphaël Fournier	**(France) Raphaël Fournier**	(France) Kévin Ropars	(France) Claude Carlos	(France) Lucas Guichard	(France) Stéphane Codet
5	R4	(France) Circuit de Lédenon		**(France) No. 34 SP Compétition**	(France) No. 3 Team Pilote 69 by JSB	(France) No. 39 Team Leal Compétition	(France) No. 1 LB Compétition	(France) No. 5 Team CDRS
5	R4	(France) Circuit de Lédenon		**(Belgium) Giovanni Scamardi**	(France) Beltramelli Viny	(France) Leal Thomas	(France) Lucas Guichard	(France) Stéphane Codet
6	R1	(France) Circuit Paul Ricard	(France) No. 34 SP Compétition	**(France) No. 34 SP Compétition**	(France) No. 7 JSB Compétition	(France) No. 115 ADWShop Motorsport	(France) No. 25 JSB Compétition	(France) No. 5 Team CDRS
6	R1	(France) Circuit Paul Ricard	(Belgium) Giovanni Scamardi	**(Belgium) Giovanni Scamardi**	(France) Florian Briché	(France) Mickaël Boisdur	(France) Karel Eyoum	(France) Stéphane Codet
6	R2	(France) Circuit Paul Ricard		**(France) No. 34 SP Compétition**	(France) No. 7 JSB Compétition	(France) No. 115 ADWShop Motorsport	(France) No. 19 JSB Compétition	(France) No. 29 Team CDRS
6	R2	(France) Circuit Paul Ricard		**(Belgium) Giovanni Scamardi**	(France) Florian Briché	(France) Mickaël Boisdur	(France) Léo Berson	(France) David Chiche
6	R3	(France) Circuit Paul Ricard	(France) No. 34 SP Compétition	**(France) No. 34 SP Compétition**	(France) No. 7 JSB Compétition	(France) No. 115 ADWShop Motorsport	(France) No. 25 JSB Compétition	(France) No. 5 Team CDRS
6	R3	(France) Circuit Paul Ricard	(Belgium) Giovanni Scamardi	**(Belgium) Giovanni Scamardi**	(France) Florian Briché	(France) Mickaël Boisdur	(France) Karel Eyoum	(France) Stéphane Codet
6	R4	(France) Circuit Paul Ricard		**(France) No. 38 SP Compétition**	(France) No. 7 JSB Compétition	(France) No. 33 Team Leal Compétition	(France) No. 25 JSB Compétition	(France) No. 29 Team CDRS
6	R4	(France) Circuit Paul Ricard		**(France) Tom Pussier**	(France) Florian Briché	(France) Claude Carlos	(France) Karel Eyoum	(France) David Chiche

== Championship standings ==
=== Scoring system ===
Championship points are awarded for the first ten positions in each race. Entries are required to complete 75% of the winning car's race distance in order to be classified and earn points.

Position	1st	2nd	3rd	4th	5th	6th	7th	8th	9th	10th
Points	25	18	15	12	10	8	6	4	2	1

=== TCR ===
Pos.	Drivers	Team	NOG (France)				DIJ (France)				SPA (Belgium)				MAG (France)				LÉD (France)				LEC (France)				Pts
Pos.	Drivers	Team	RD1	RD2	RD3	RD4	RD1	RD2	RD3	RD4	RD1	RD2	RD3	RD4	RD1	RD2	RD3	RD4	RD1	RD2	RD3	RD4	RD1	RD2	RD3	RD4	Pts
1	(Belgium) Giovanni Scamardi	(France) SP Compétition	1	1	2	1	3	5	1	2	1	1	1	1	2	2	1	1	2	1	2	1	1	1	1	2	263
2	(France) Raphaël Fournier	(France) JSB Compétition	2	2	1	2	1	1	2	1	Ret	2	2	2	Ret	1	2	2	1	2	1	2	DNS	DNS			161
3	(France) Gilles Chauvin	(France) SP Compétition	3	3	4	4	4	2	4	3	2	4	3	4	1	3	3	Ret	4	4	4	3	2	3	DSQ	3	143
4	(France) Tom Pussier	(France) SP Compétition	Ret	4	Ret	5	6	3	5	5	4	3	5	3	3	4	4	3	5	5	5	4	4	2	2	1	143
5	(France) Franck Salvi	(Czech Republic) Janik Motorsport	Ret		5																						102
5	(France) Franck Salvi	(France) JSB Compétition					5	4	3	4	3	5	4	DNS					3	3	3	5	3	4	3	DNS	102
6	(France) Pierre Bredeaux	(France) Comte Racing Team	Ret	DNS	3	3	2	Ret																			24
7	(France) Julien Briché	(France) JSB Compétition	4	DNS	Ret																						6
Pos.	Driver	Team	NOG (France)				DIJ (France)				SPA (Belgium)				MAG (France)				LÉD (France)				LEC (France)				Pts

Key
Colour	Result
Gold	Race winner
Silver	2nd place
Bronze	3rd place
Green	Points finish
Blue	Non-points finish
Blue	Non-classified finish (NC)
Purple	Did not finish (Ret)
Black	Disqualified (DSQ)
Black	Excluded (EX)
White	Did not start (DNS)
White	Race cancelled (C)
White	Withdrew (WD)
Blank	Did not participate

=== TC ===
Pos.	Drivers	Team	NOG (France)				DIJ (France)				SPA (Belgium)				MAG (France)				LÉD (France)				LEC (France)				Pts
Pos.	Drivers	Team	RD1	RD2	RD3	RD4	RD1	RD2	RD3	RD4	RD1	RD2	RD3	RD4	RD1	RD2	RD3	RD4	RD1	RD2	RD3	RD4	RD1	RD2	RD3	RD4	Pts
1	(France) Florian Briché	(France) JSB Compétition	2	1	1	2	1	1	4	1	1	1	1	1	1	1	1	2	Ret		Ret		1	1	1	1	233
2	(France) Kévin Ropars	(France) 2RT	1	2	2	1	2	2	3	2	2	2	2	2	2	NC	2	1	1	1	1	1	4	DNS	4	Ret	206
3	(France) José Beltramelli	(France) Team Pilote 69 by JSB					3	5	2	4	5	3	4	DNS	3	2	4	3	2		2		2		2		148
4	(France) Théo Vidal	(France) JSB Compétition		5		3													3	2	3	2		2		3	91
5	(France) Colin Boreau	(France) Boreau Team Sport by JSB	3		3		4		Ret		4		6		DNS												62
6	(France) Franck Labescat	(France) Boreau Team Sport by JSB		3		4		3		DNS		6		7													56
7	(France) Guillaume Lentier	(France) JMRP Racing					6	4	Ret	5													3	3	3	2	47
8	(France) Martial Camurac	(France) JSB Compétition	4		4						6	9	5	4													40
9	(France) Rodolphe Spitz	(France) JSB Compétition					5	6	1	3	9	4	9	DNS	DNS												37
10	(France) Rudy Burot	(France) RJC Racing by Touzery									3	4	3	3													28
11	(Switzerland) Christophe Gaillard	(France) eXigence Motorsport	5	4	5	5	Ret	Ret	DNS	DNS																	21
12	(France) Benjamin Breton	(France) eXigence Motorsport													4	3	3	Ret									21
13	(France) Eric Oddos-Piantone	(France) STR									7	7	7	5													14
14	(France) François Chevalier	(France) Touzery Compétition									8	8	8	6													10
Pos.	Driver	Team	NOG (France)				DIJ (France)				SPA (Belgium)				MAG (France)				LÉD (France)				LEC (France)				Pts

Key
Colour	Result
Gold	Race winner
Silver	2nd place
Bronze	3rd place
Green	Points finish
Blue	Non-points finish
Blue	Non-classified finish (NC)
Purple	Did not finish (Ret)
Black	Disqualified (DSQ)
Black	Excluded (EX)
White	Did not start (DNS)
White	Race cancelled (C)
White	Withdrew (WD)
Blank	Did not participate

=== TCA ===
Pos.	Drivers	Team	NOG (France)				DIJ (France)				SPA (Belgium)				MAG (France)				LÉD (France)				LEC (France)				Pts
Pos.	Drivers	Team	RD1	RD2	RD3	RD4	RD1	RD2	RD3	RD4	RD1	RD2	RD3	RD4	RD1	RD2	RD3	RD4	RD1	RD2	RD3	RD4	RD1	RD2	RD3	RD4	Pts
1	(France) Mickaël Boisdur	(France) ADWShop Motorsport	3	3	1	6	1	2	3	1	1	1	1	1	1	1	2	Ret	1		2		1	1	1	Ret	238
2	(France) Claude Carlos	(France) Team Leal Compétition	6		4		4		1		5		Ret		4		1		2		1		2		2		183
3	(France) Martin Scarnière	(France) ADWShop Motorsport	2	5	DNS	3		1		2	4		3					6		5		5		3		2	153
4	(France) Lubin Henry	(France) Team Leal Compétition		DNS		4		3		DNS		Ret		2		2		1		1		1		7		DNS	144
5	(France) Julien Carlos	(France) Team Leal Compétition		4		5		5		4		Ret		DNS		6				3		2		2		1	128
6	(France) Yannis Lafon	(France) JSB Compétition	4	6	7	Ret	3	4	Ret	3	6	2	5	3	6	3	6	3	6	2	Ret	3	3	5	Ret	3	123
7	(France) Christophe Henry	(France) Team Leal Compétition	Ret		6						2		2		2		3		Ret		5		Ret		Ret		87
8	(France) Victor Benmoussa	(France) ADWShop Motorsport					5		2			5		5	7		8						5	6	4	5	78
9	(France) Patrick Pujol	(France) JG Compétition	5	7	5	7					7	4	6	6	Ret	Ret			5	DNS	4	4	4	4	3	4	76
10	(France) François Samy	(France) Sport Cup 88	1	1	2	1																					69
10	(France) François Samy	(France) Escot Competition														4		5									69
11	(France) Michel Béziat	(France) Team Leal Compétition										3		4	Ret	DNS	7	4		4							48
12	(France) Michel Leal	(France) Team Leal Compétition					2		Ret										4		3						45
13	(France) Bastien Girard	(France) Team Leal Compétition									3		4						3		Ret						42
14	(France) Christophe Pereira	(France) Team CDRS		2		2																					36
15	(France) Julien Pellegrini	(France) Optimum Racing													3	5	4	2									28
16	(France) Jérémy Escot	(France) Escot Competition													5		5										20
17	(France) Cyril Melet	(France) Team CDRS	Ret		3																						15
Pos.	Driver	Team	NOG (France)				DIJ (France)				SPA (Belgium)				MAG (France)				LÉD (France)				LEC (France)				Pts

Key
Colour	Result
Gold	Race winner
Silver	2nd place
Bronze	3rd place
Green	Points finish
Blue	Non-points finish
Blue	Non-classified finish (NC)
Purple	Did not finish (Ret)
Black	Disqualified (DSQ)
Black	Excluded (EX)
White	Did not start (DNS)
White	Race cancelled (C)
White	Withdrew (WD)
Blank	Did not participate

=== TCA Light ===
Pos.	Drivers	Team	NOG (France)				DIJ (France)				SPA (Belgium)				MAG (France)				LÉD (France)				LEC (France)				Pts
Pos.	Drivers	Team	RD1	RD2	RD3	RD4	RD1	RD2	RD3	RD4	RD1	RD2	RD3	RD4	RD1	RD2	RD3	RD4	RD1	RD2	RD3	RD4	RD1	RD2	RD3	RD4	Pts
1	(France) Karel Eyoum	(France) JSB Compétition	Ret	3	3	2	2	1	3	1	1	1	1	1	1	2	9	1	1	1	4	NC	1	9	1	1	220
2	(France) Léo Berson	(France) JSB Compétition	3		1		1		1		3		7		2		2		4		2		Ret	1	2	4	205
3	(France) Nicolas Roumezy	(France) Comte Racing Team	2		5		3		2		4		4			6		4		3		3		3		2	168
4	(France) Frederic Rondeau	(France) Sport Auto Racing		5		3		3		3		7		6		5		8						5		5	96
5	(France) Mathis Briché	(France) JSB Compétition					4	2	5	2	9	6	9	Ret	4	9	4	6	5	5	5	4	4	4	8	3	95
6	(France) Lucas Guichard	(France) Team Montbéliard									Ret	5	6	5	8	1	1	2	2	DNS	1	1					84
7	(France) Marvin Barinsky	(France) Barinsky Automobiles													3	3	3	3	3	2	3	2	2	2	Ret	DNS	81
8	(France) Sébastien Bortot	(France) Beyond Virtual by 2RT	7	4	7	4	9	4	6	7					5	10	5	5	6	4	6	5	6	7	3	8	80
9	(France) Margot Carvalhido	(France) Sport Auto Racing	6		6		6		4		8		10		6		Ret						3		4		76
10	(France) Tanguy Weiss	(France) Comte Racing Team		6		5		5		8		9		7	9		8		7		7		8		5		72
11	(France) Timothée Carrée	(France) T2CM					5	9	7	4					7	7	7	9					5	6	7	6	48
12	(France) Vincent Vevres	(France) First Racing	1	1	2	1																					47
13	(France) Max Ciciliani	(France) Team Montbéliard									2	2	2	2													36
14	(France) Matthieu Collin	(France) 2RT					8	5	9	5					10	8	6	7					7	8	6	7	36
15	(France) Vincent Treillaud	(France) Team Montbéliard									7	3	3	3													26
16	(France) Arthur Salvi	(France) JSB Compétition	4		4																						24
17	(France) Pierre Lyps	(France) Comte Racing Team									6		5														18
18	(France) François Tillos	(France) Team CDRS		2		Ret																					18
19	(France) Jean-Patrick Caillet	(France) JSB Compétition						7		Ret						4		10									17
20	(France) Romain Gregori	(France) Team Montbéliard									5	8	8	4													15
21	(France) Hervé Sivignon	(France) Comte Racing Team										4		Ret													12
22	(France) Jacques Tillos	(France) Team CDRS	5		9																						12
23	(France) Sylvain Gonzales	(France) Sport Auto Racing	8	7	8	6																					11
24	(Switzerland) Yohann Segala	(France) Sport Auto Racing					7	8	8	6																	10
25	(France) Elvina Savet	(France) Team Montbéliard									10	10	11	8													3
Pos.	Driver	Team	NOG (France)				DIJ (France)				SPA (Belgium)				MAG (France)				LÉD (France)				LEC (France)				Pts

Key
Colour	Result
Gold	Race winner
Silver	2nd place
Bronze	3rd place
Green	Points finish
Blue	Non-points finish
Blue	Non-classified finish (NC)
Purple	Did not finish (Ret)
Black	Disqualified (DSQ)
Black	Excluded (EX)
White	Did not start (DNS)
White	Race cancelled (C)
White	Withdrew (WD)
Blank	Did not participate

=== GT Light ===
Pos.	Drivers	Team	NOG (France)				DIJ (France)				SPA (Belgium)				MAG (France)				LÉD (France)				LEC (France)				Pts
Pos.	Drivers	Team	RD1	RD2	RD3	RD4	RD1	RD2	RD3	RD4	RD1	RD2	RD3	RD4	RD1	RD2	RD3	RD4	RD1	RD2	RD3	RD4	RD1	RD2	RD3	RD4	Pts
1	(France) David Chiche	(France) Team CDRS	2	1	2	1	1	1	2	1	2	2	2	2	1	1	4	1	2	1	2	2	2	1	2	1	252
2	(France) Stéphane Codet	(France) Team CDRS	Ret	3	3	2	2	2	1	3	1	1	1	1					1	Ret	1	1	1	2	1	2	193
3	(France) Laurent Joubert	(France) J'Nov Auto Racing by JSB	Ret	5	4	4	3	3	3	2	3	3	5	3	2	2	1	2	3	2	3	3	3	4	3	3	176
4	(France) Thierry Pellerzi	(France) TCP Racing by STR	4	6	6	5						5		5	4	4	3	4	4	DNS	4	4	5		6		101
5	(France) Julien Nougaret	(France) Team CDRS		2		3																		3		5	58
6	(France) Guillaume Rousseau	(France) STR	1		1																						50
7	(France) Dorian Duthil	(France) Team CDRS	3		5																		4		5		47
8	(France) Guillaume Huber	(France) Team CDRS					4	4	4	4													Ret	6	4	6	38
9	(France) Olivier Hulot	(France) TCP Racing by STR									Ret		3											5		4	37
10	(France) Eric Oddos-Piantone	(France) STR													3	3	2	3									32
10	(Belgium) Nicolas Guelinckx	(France) Chazel Technologie Course									4	4	4	4													24
11	(France) Alexandre Ducos	(France) STR		4		6																					20
Pos.	Driver	Team	NOG (France)				DIJ (France)				SPA (Belgium)				MAG (France)				LÉD (France)				LEC (France)				Pts

Key
Colour	Result
Gold	Race winner
Silver	2nd place
Bronze	3rd place
Green	Points finish
Blue	Non-points finish
Blue	Non-classified finish (NC)
Purple	Did not finish (Ret)
Black	Disqualified (DSQ)
Black	Excluded (EX)
White	Did not start (DNS)
White	Race cancelled (C)
White	Withdrew (WD)
Blank	Did not participate

== See also ==
- 2025 TC America Series
