= 2018 ADAC TCR Germany Touring Car Championship =

Motorsport season

The 2018 ADAC TCR Germany Touring Car Championship was the third season of touring car racing ran by the German-based sanctioning body ADAC to the TCR regulations. The series ran predominantly in ADAC's home nation Germany. As a support category to the ADAC GT Masters series, the championship also had races in the neighbouring nations of Austria, the Netherlands and the Czech Republic.

Josh Files was the defending Drivers' champion, while Target Competition was the defending Teams' champions. In 2018 Harald Proczyk and HP Racing International became the champions.

== Teams and drivers ==
Team	Car	No.	Drivers	Rounds
Team Engstler Germany	Volkswagen Golf GTI TCR	3	(Germany) Kai Jordan	All
Team Engstler Germany	Volkswagen Golf GTI TCR	77	(Germany) Justin Häußermann	1–4, 6–7
(Germany) Team Engstler Europe	Volkswagen Golf GTI TCR	39	(Switzerland) Florian Thoma	1–3
(Germany) Team Engstler Europe	Volkswagen Golf GTI TCR	47	(Finland) Niko Kankkunen	All
(Switzerland) Wolf-Power Racing	Renault Mégane TCR	5	(United Kingdom) Alex Morgan	1
(Switzerland) Wolf-Power Racing	CUPRA León TCR	6	(Switzerland) Oliver Holdener	1–4, 7
(Germany) Honda ADAC Sachsen	Honda Civic Type R TCR (FK8)	7	(Germany) Mike Halder	All
(Germany) Honda ADAC Sachsen	Honda Civic Type R TCR (FK8)	88	(Germany) Dominik Fugel	All
(Germany) Liqui Moly Team Engstler (Germany) Hyundai Team Engstler	Volkswagen Golf GTI TCR	8	(Germany) Luca Engstler	1–3
(Germany) Liqui Moly Team Engstler (Germany) Hyundai Team Engstler	Hyundai i30 N TCR	8	(Germany) Luca Engstler	4–7
(Germany) Liqui Moly Team Engstler (Germany) Hyundai Team Engstler	Hyundai i30 N TCR	27	(France) Théo Coicaud	4–7
(Germany) Liqui Moly Team Engstler (Germany) Hyundai Team Engstler	Volkswagen Golf GTI TCR	27	(France) Théo Coicaud	1–3
(Germany) Max Kruse Racing	Volkswagen Golf GTI TCR	10	(Germany) Benjamin Leuchter	All
(Germany) Max Kruse Racing	Volkswagen Golf GTI TCR	39	(Switzerland) Florian Thoma	4–7
(Austria) HP Racing International	Opel Astra TCR	11	(Germany) Luke Wankmüller	All
(Austria) HP Racing International	Opel Astra TCR	22	(Austria) Harald Proczyk	All
(Germany) RacingOne	Audi RS3 LMS TCR	14	(Netherlands) Niels Langeveld	All
(Germany) RacingOne	Audi RS3 LMS TCR	99	(Netherlands) Maurits Sandberg	1–2, 4–7
(Switzerland) Besagroup Team Renault	Renault Mégane TCR	15	(Croatia) Franjo Kovač	4
(Switzerland) Besagroup Team Renault	Renault Mégane TCR	41	(Germany) Steve Kirsch	1, 4, 6
(Czech Republic) Steibel Motorsport	Opel Astra TCR	17	(Switzerland) Jasmin Preisig	All
(Czech Republic) Steibel Motorsport	Volkswagen Golf GTI TCR	23	(Germany) Sebastian Steibel	All
(Germany) PROsport Performance	Audi RS3 LMS TCR	19	(Germany) Max Hesse	All
(Germany) PROsport Performance	Audi RS3 LMS TCR	44	(Germany) Sandro Kaibach	1–3
(Germany) PROsport Performance	Audi RS3 LMS TCR	45	(Germany) Peter Terting	4
(Finland) Positione Motorsport	Volkswagen Golf GTI TCR	29	(Finland) Jussi Kuusiniemi	All
(Finland) LMS Racing	Audi RS3 LMS TCR	30	(Finland) Antti Buri	All
(Switzerland) TOPCAR Sport	CUPRA León TCR	33	(Switzerland) J.C. Reynolds	All
(Switzerland) TOPCAR Sport	CUPRA León TCR	60	(Germany) Loris Prattes	1–3, 5–7
(Austria) Niedertscheider Motorsport Team	Peugeot 308 TCR	42	(Austria) Lukas Niedertscheider	All
(Germany) Profi-Car Team Halder	CUPRA León TCR	53	(Germany) Michelle Halder	All
(Germany) Profi-Car Team Halder	Honda Civic Type R TCR (FK2)	55	(Germany) Marcel Fugel	1–3, 6–7
(Germany) YACO Racing	Audi RS3 LMS TCR	54	(Austria) Simon Reicher	All
Entries ineligible to score points
(Czech Republic) Fullín Race Academy	CUPRA León TCR	2	(Czech Republic) Petr Fulín	1–2
(Germany) Lubner Motorsport	Opel Astra TCR	4	(Germany) Jan Seyffert	3–4, 6
(Switzerland) Besagroup Team Renault	Renault Mégane TCR	5	(United Kingdom) Alex Morgan	6
(Austria) HP Racing International	Opel Astra TCR	9	(Germany) Daniel Davidovac	3–4, 7
(Austria) Tessitore Racing	Opel Astra TCR	13	(Austria) "Tessitore"	3
(Czech Republic) Steibel Motorsport	CUPRA León TCR	28	(Switzerland) Pascal Eberle	6–7
(Switzerland) Young Driver Challenge	CUPRA León TCR	31	(Switzerland) Leonardo Tinland	4
(Switzerland) Young Driver Challenge	CUPRA León TCR	32	(Switzerland) Francesco Ruga	6
(Switzerland) Young Driver Challenge	CUPRA León TCR	34	(Switzerland) Julien Apothéloz	7
(Germany) BC Motorsport	Opel Astra TCR	36	(Germany) Dino Calcum	3
(Switzerland) Vuković Motorsport	Renault Mégane TCR	36	(Germany) Dino Calcum	4
(Finland) LMS Racing	CUPRA León TCR	40	(Finland) Olli Parhankangas	4
(Switzerland) Wolf-Power Racing	Renault Mégane TCR	50	(Switzerland) Milenko Vuković	3

=== Team and driver changes ===
Former ADAC Procar champions YACO Racing will enter the series with a single Audi RS3 LMS TCR for Simon Reicher, who moves from Certainty Racing Team.

Wolf-Power Racing will switch from SEAT León TCR to Renault Mégane TCR for the 2018 season.

Engstler Motorsport will retain Luca Engstler and Floran Thoma. In addition the team will increase to five cars during the entire season signing Théo Coicaud, Justin Häußermann and Niko Kankkunen.

German footballer Max Kruse will set up his own team Max Kruse Racing, fielding a single Volkswagen Golf GTI TCR for Benjamin Leuchter, who returns to the series after missing out the 2017 season.

Reigning double teams' champion Target Competition withdrew from the series to join the TCR Europe Series. The team had originally signed Reece Barr to drive in the series.

== Calendar and results ==
The 2018 schedule was announced on 30 November 2017, with three events scheduled to be held outside Germany. The championship will again run in support of the ADAC GT Masters weekends.

Rnd.		Circuit	Date	Pole position	Fastest lap	Winning driver	Winning team	Supporting
1	1	(Germany) Motorsport Arena Oschersleben, Oschersleben	14 April	(Germany) Mike Halder	(Germany) Mike Halder	(Austria) Harald Proczyk	(Austria) HP Racing International	ADAC GT Masters; ADAC Formula 4 Championship
1	2	(Germany) Motorsport Arena Oschersleben, Oschersleben	15 April		(Germany) Benjamin Leuchter	(Germany) Mike Halder	(Germany) Honda ADAC Sachsen	ADAC GT Masters; ADAC Formula 4 Championship
2	3	(Czech Republic) Autodrom Most, Most	28 April	(Germany) Mike Halder	(Finland) Antti Buri	(Finland) Antti Buri	(Finland) LMS Racing	ADAC GT Masters
2	4	(Czech Republic) Autodrom Most, Most	29 April		(Netherlands) Niels Langeveld	(Germany) Michelle Halder (Note: Actual victory in race scored by Petr Fulín for Fullín Race Academy, but as he is considered guest entry, he was ineligible to score points.)	(Germany) Profi-Car Team Halder	ADAC GT Masters
3	5	(Austria) Red Bull Ring, Spielberg	10 June	(Netherlands) Niels Langeveld	(Netherlands) Niels Langeveld	(Netherlands) Niels Langeveld	(Germany) RacingOne	ADAC GT Masters; ADAC Formula 4 Championship
3	6	(Austria) Red Bull Ring, Spielberg	10 June		(Finland) Antti Buri	(Austria) Harald Proczyk	(Austria) HP Racing International	ADAC GT Masters; ADAC Formula 4 Championship
4	7	(Germany) Nürburgring, Nürburg	5 August	(Germany) Mike Halder	(Germany) Mike Halder	(Germany) Mike Halder	(Germany) Honda ADAC Sachsen	ADAC GT Masters; ADAC Formula 4 Championship
4	8	(Germany) Nürburgring, Nürburg	5 August		(Germany) Mike Halder	(Germany) Dominik Fugel	(Germany) Honda ADAC Sachsen	ADAC GT Masters; ADAC Formula 4 Championship
5	9	(Netherlands) Circuit Park Zandvoort, Zandvoort	19 August	(Netherlands) Niels Langeveld	(Netherlands) Niels Langeveld	(Netherlands) Niels Langeveld	(Germany) RacingOne	ADAC GT Masters
5	10	(Netherlands) Circuit Park Zandvoort, Zandvoort	19 August		(Netherlands) Niels Langeveld	(Germany) Luca Engstler	(Germany) Hyundai Team Engstler	ADAC GT Masters
6	11	(Germany) Sachsenring, Hohenstein-Ernstthal	9 September	(Germany) Luca Engstler	(Germany) Luca Engstler	(Germany) Luca Engstler	(Germany) Hyundai Team Engstler	ADAC GT Masters
6	12	(Germany) Sachsenring, Hohenstein-Ernstthal	9 September		(Germany) Michelle Halder	(Germany) Luca Engstler	(Germany) Hyundai Team Engstler	ADAC GT Masters
7	13	(Germany) Hockenheimring, Hockenheim	23 September	(Austria) Harald Proczyk	(Austria) Harald Proczyk	(Austria) Harald Proczyk	(Austria) HP Racing International	ADAC GT Masters; ADAC Formula 4 Championship
7	14	(Germany) Hockenheimring, Hockenheim	23 September		(Germany) Mike Halder	(Germany) Mike Halder	(Germany) Honda ADAC Sachsen	ADAC GT Masters; ADAC Formula 4 Championship

=== Calendar changes ===
The series would make its first visit to the Czech Republic on 29 April at the Autodrom Most becoming the second round of the season.

The second round held at the Motorsport Arena Oschersleben, which supported the TCR International Series since the series' inception, was discontinued.

=== Drivers' Championship ===
Scoring systems

Position	1st	2nd	3rd	4th	5th	6th	7th	8th	9th	10th	11th	12th	13th	14th	15th	16th	17th	18th	19th	20th	PP	FL
Points	40	36	32	29	26	23	20	18	16	14	12	10	8	7	6	5	4	3	2	1	**5**	1

Pos.	Driver	OSC‡ (Germany)		MST (Czech Republic)		RBR (Austria)		NÜR (Germany)		ZAN (Netherlands)		SAC (Germany)		HOC (Germany)		Pts.
1	(Austria) Harald Proczyk	1^{3}	6	3^{5}	5	5^{5}	1	13	5	3^{3}	6	3^{3}	4	**1**^{1}	3	421
2	(Germany) Luca Engstler	3	4	6	3	7	4	9	6	5	1	**1**^{1}	1	3^{2}	4	414
3	(Netherlands) Niels Langeveld	2	3	11	4	**1**^{1}	8	3^{4}	11	**1**^{1}	3	6	5	4	2	403
4	(Germany) Mike Halder	**24**^{1}	1	**2**^{1}	10	4^{4}	Ret	**1**^{1}	3	4^{4}	5	2^{2}	Ret	2^{3}	1	366
5	(Finland) Antti Buri	22	16	1^{2}	25	2^{2}	2	8	12	2^{2}	8	4	10	24†	17†	259
6	(Germany) Max Hesse	25†	12	7^{3}	6	8^{3}	7	4^{2}	7	8^{5}	21	8	8	9^{4}	8	247
7	(Germany) Luke Wankmüller	6^{5}	9	17	13	6	6	12	4	9	4	7	24	19	5	228
8	(Germany) Benjamin Leuchter	9	7	15	14	3	3	6	2	Ret	9	10	Ret	5^{5}	Ret	224.5
9	(Germany) Michelle Halder	13	15	18	2	15	13	5^{5}	10	Ret	12	5	2	15	10	208.5
10	(Austria) Simon Reicher	4	Ret	4^{4}	17	10	11	10	19	6	7	12	11	Ret	15	182
11	(Germany) Dominik Fugel	Ret^{4}	DNS	Ret	7	17	12	2	1	11	10	9	Ret	13	18†	172
12	(France) Theo Coicaud	11	8	Ret	Ret	18	Ret	7	8	7	2	23†	6	7	Ret	172
13	(Finland) Niko Kankkunen	8	11	10	8	16	20	20	23	10	16	Ret	9	10	6	148
14	(Switzerland) Florian Thoma	Ret^{2}	5	16	19	9	5	27†	14	12	14	14	13	18	Ret	115.5
15	(Switzerland) Oliver Holdener	15	14	8	11	14	14	15	9					14	7	110
16	(Germany) Justin Häußermann	12	Ret	12	9	Ret	16	14	16			17^{5}	7	12	16†	107
17	(Austria) Lukas Niedertscheider	16	10	20	16	Ret	10	16^{3}	15	Ret	11	13	14	8	Ret	98
18	(Germany) Kai Jordan	10	Ret	19	Ret	11	18	19	21	Ret	13	Ret	12	11	13	82
29	(Germany) Loris Prattes	18	Ret	9	12	Ret	15			Ret	18	11	16	Ret	11	75
20	(Germany) Sandro Kaibach	5	18	14	21	13	9									63
21	(Finland) Jussi Kuusiniemi	14	13	13	15	Ret	Ret	17	20	13	15	Ret	15	16	Ret	63
22	(Switzerland) Jasmin Preisig	17	Ret	21	24	23	17	11	18	Ret	17	21	18	Ret	DNS	37
23	(Germany) Marcel Fugel	26†	Ret	24	23	19	19					15	17	20	12	31
24	(Germany) Sebastian Steibel	21	Ret	Ret	18	Ret	24	21	24	14	19	22	23	Ret	14	25
25	(United States) J.C. Reynolds	20	17	22	20	22	Ret	22	25	15	20	20	22	23	Ret	21.5
26	(Netherlands) Maurits Sandberg	19	Ret	23	22			24	27	Ret	Ret	19	21	21	Ret	12
27	(Germany) Peter Terting							Ret	13							8
28	(United Kingdom) Alex Morgan	23	19									16	Ret			1.5
	(Germany) Steve Kirsch	DNQ	DNQ					DNS	DNS			Ret	DNS			-
	(Croatia) Franjo Kovač							DNS	DNS							-
	(Switzerland) Milenko Vuković					DNS	WD									-
Drivers ineligible to score points
	(Czech Republic) Petr Fulín	7	2	5	1											0
	(Switzerland) Pascal Eberle											24†	3	6	Ret	0
	(Switzerland) Julien Apothéloz													17	9	0
	(Germany) Dino Calcum					12	Ret	23	Ret							0
	(Finland) Olli Kangas							18	17							0
	(Germany) Jan Seyffert					20	21	Ret	22			18	20			0
	(Switzerland) Francesco Ruga											Ret	19			0
	(Austria) "Tessitore"					21	23									0
	(Germany) Daniel Davidovac					Ret	22	25	28†					22	Ret	0
	(Switzerland) Leonardo Tinland							26	26							0
Pos.	Driver	OSC‡ (Germany)		MST (Czech Republic)		RBR (Austria)		NÜR (Germany)		ZAN (Netherlands)		SAC (Germany)		HOC (Germany)		Pts.

Colour	Result
Gold	Winner
Silver	Second place
Bronze	Third place
Green	Points classification
Blue	Non-points classification
Blue	Non-classified finish (NC)
Purple	Retired, not classified (Ret)
Red	Did not qualify (DNQ)
Red	Did not pre-qualify (DNPQ)
Black	Disqualified (DSQ)
White	Did not start (DNS)
White	Withdrew (WD)
White	Race cancelled (C)
Blank	Did not practice (DNP)
Blank	Did not arrive (DNA)
Blank	Excluded (EX)

**Bold** – Pole
Italics – Fastest Lap

† – Drivers did not finish the race, but were classified as they completed over 75% of the race distance.
‡ – Half points were awarded in Race 2 at Motorsport Arena Oschersleben as less than 75% of the scheduled distance was completed.

=== Teams' Championship ===
Pos.	Team	OSC‡ (Germany)		MST (Czech Republic)		RBR (Austria)		NÜR (Germany)		ZAN (Netherlands)		SAC (Germany)		HOC (Germany)		Pts.
1	(Austria) HP Racing International	1^{3}	6	3^{5}	5	5^{5}	1	13	5	3^{3}	6	3^{3}	4	**1**^{1}	3	161
1	(Austria) HP Racing International	6^{5}	9	17	13	6	6	12	4	9	4	7	24	19	5	161
2	(Germany) Liqui Moly Team Engstler	3	4	6	3	7	4	9	6	5	1	**1**^{1}	1	3^{2}	4	134
2	(Germany) Liqui Moly Team Engstler	11	8	Ret	Ret	18	Ret	7	8	7	2	23†	6	7	Ret	134
3	(Germany) RacingOne	2	3	11	4	**1**^{1}	8	3^{4}	11	**1**^{1}	3	6	5	4	2	103
3	(Germany) RacingOne	19	Ret	23	22			24	27	Ret	Ret	19	21	21	Ret	103
4	(Germany) Honda ADAC Sachsen	**24**^{1}	1	**2**^{1}	10	4^{4}	Ret	**1**^{1}	3	4^{4}	5	2^{2}	Ret	2^{3}	1	97
4	(Germany) Honda ADAC Sachsen	Ret^{4}	DNS	Ret	7	17	12	2	1	11	10	9	Ret	13	18†	97
5	(Germany) PROsport Performance	25†	12	7^{3}	6	8^{3}	7	4^{2}	7	8^{5}	21	8	8	9^{4}	8	92
5	(Germany) PROsport Performance	5	18	14	21	13	9	Ret	13							92
6	(Germany) Team Engstler Europe	8	11	10	8	16	20	20	23	10	16	Ret	9	10	6	86.5
6	(Germany) Team Engstler Europe	Ret^{2}	5	16	19	9	5									86.5
7	(Germany) YACO Racing	4	Ret	4^{4}	17	10	11	10	19	6	7	12	11	Ret	15	63
8	(Germany) Profi-Car Team Halder	13	15	18	2	15	13	5^{5}	10	Ret	12	5	2	15	10	60.5
8	(Germany) Profi-Car Team Halder	26†	Ret	24	23	19	19					15	17	20	12	60.5
9	Team Engstler Germany	10	Ret	19	Ret	11	18	19	21	Ret	13	Ret	12	11	13	60
9	Team Engstler Germany	12	Ret	12	9	Ret	16	14	16			17^{5}	7	12	16†	60
10	(Finland) LMS Racing	22	16	1^{2}	25	2^{2}	2	8	12	2^{2}	8	4	10	24†	17†	48
11	(Switzerland) Wolf-Power Racing	15	14	8	11	14	14	15	9					14	7	46.5
11	(Switzerland) Wolf-Power Racing	23	19			DNS	WD					16	Ret			46.5
12	(Germany) Max Kruse Racing	9	7	15	14	3	3	6	2	Ret	9	10	Ret	5^{5}	Ret	44.5
12	(Germany) Max Kruse Racing							27†	14	12	14	14	13	18	Ret	44.5
13	(Switzerland) TOPCAR Sport	20	17	22	20	22	Ret	22	25	15	20	20	22	23	Ret	40.5
13	(Switzerland) TOPCAR Sport	18	Ret	9	12	Ret	15			Ret	18	11	16	Ret	11	40.5
14	(Finland) Positione Motorsport	14	13	13	15	Ret	Ret	17	20	13	15	Ret	15	16	Ret	30
15	(Austria) Niedertscheider MSP	16	10	20	16	Ret	10	16^{3}	15	Ret	11	13	14	8	Ret	21
16	(Czech Republic) Steibel Motorsport	17	Ret	21	24	23	17	11	18	Ret	17	21	18	Ret	DNS	10
16	(Czech Republic) Steibel Motorsport	21	Ret	Ret	18	Ret	24	21	24	14	19	22	23	Ret	14	10
17	(Switzerland) Besagroup Team Renault	DNQ	DNQ					DNS	DNS			Ret	DNS			0
17	(Switzerland) Besagroup Team Renault							DNS	DNS							0
Teams ineligible to score points
-	(Czech Republic) Fullín Race Academy	7	2	5	1											0
-	(Czech Republic) Steibel Motorsport											24†	3	6	Ret	0
-	(Switzerland) Young Driver Challenge							26	26			Ret	19	17	9	0
-	(Germany) BC Motorsport					12	Ret									0
-	(Switzerland) Vuković Motorsport							23	Ret							0
-	(Finland) LMS Racing							18	17							0
-	(Germany) Lubner Motorsport					20	21	Ret	22			18	20			0
-	(Austria) Tessitore Racing					21	23									0
-	(Austria) HP Racing International					Ret	22	25	28†					22	Ret	0
Pos.	Driver	OSC‡ (Germany)		MST (Czech Republic)		RBR (Austria)		NÜR (Germany)		ZAN (Netherlands)		SAC (Germany)		HOC (Germany)		Pts.
