= 2017 ADAC TCR Germany Touring Car Championship =

Motorsport road racing competition

The 2017 ADAC TCR Germany Touring Car Championship was the second season of touring car racing to be run by the German-based sanctioning body ADAC to the TCR regulations. The series ran predominantly in ADAC's home nation Germany. As a support category to the ADAC GT Masters series, the championship also had races in the neighbouring nations of Austria and the Netherlands.

Josh Files successfully managed to defend his title, beating Mike Halder in Race 1 of the Hockenheim. Target Competition UK-SUI became Teams' champion.

== Teams and drivers ==
Team	Car	No.	Drivers	Rounds
(United Kingdom) Target Competition UK-SUI	Honda Civic Type R TCR	1	(United Kingdom) Josh Files	All
(United Kingdom) Target Competition UK-SUI	Honda Civic Type R TCR	94	(Switzerland) Kris Richard	All
(Austria) Target Competition AUT-POR	Honda Civic Type R TCR	11	(Austria) Jürgen Schmarl	All
(Austria) Target Competition AUT-POR	Honda Civic Type R TCR	27	(Portugal) José Rodrigues	1–5
(Italy) Target Competition SWE-POL	Audi RS3 LMS TCR	3	(Poland) Gosia Rdest	1–5
(Italy) Target Competition SWE-POL	Audi RS3 LMS TCR	12	(Sweden) Simon Larsson	All
(Germany) Target Competition GER	Audi RS3 LMS TCR	98	(Germany) Tom Lautenschlager	All
(Germany) Target Competition GER	Audi RS3 LMS TCR	99	(Germany) Tim Zimmermann	All
(Switzerland) Wolf-Power Racing	SEAT León TCR	2	(United Kingdom) Alex Morgan	All
(Switzerland) Wolf-Power Racing	SEAT León TCR	6	(Switzerland) Urs Sonderegger	1
(Switzerland) Wolf-Power Racing	SEAT León TCR	7	(Germany) Mike Halder	All
(Denmark) Team Engstler Dänemark	Volkswagen Golf GTI TCR	4	(Denmark) Roland Poulsen	1
(Denmark) Team Engstler Dänemark	Volkswagen Golf GTI TCR	5	(Denmark) Kristian Poulsen	1
(Germany) Junior Team Engstler	Volkswagen Golf GTI TCR	8	(Germany) Luca Engstler	All
(Germany) Junior Team Engstler	Volkswagen Golf GTI TCR	39	(Switzerland) Florian Thoma	All
(United States) Team Engstler USA	Volkswagen Golf GTI TCR	9	(Germany) Stefan Goede	All
(United States) Team Engstler USA	Volkswagen Golf GTI TCR	38	(United States) Jason Wolfe	All
(Finland) LMS Racing	Audi RS3 LMS TCR	10	(Finland) Antti Buri	1–2, 4–7
(Finland) LMS Racing	Audi RS3 LMS TCR	20	(Finland) Niko Kankkunen	All
(Germany) RacingOne	Volkswagen Golf GTI TCR	13	(Germany) Kai Jordan	1–5
(Germany) RacingOne	Audi RS3 LMS TCR	14	(Netherlands) Niels Langeveld	All
(Germany) RacingOne	Audi RS3 LMS TCR	31	(Netherlands) Floris Dullaart	3
(Germany) RacingOne	Audi RS3 LMS TCR	84	(Netherlands) Maurits Sandberg	1–2, 4–7
(Germany) Lubner Motorsport	Opel Astra TCR	17	(Switzerland) Jasmin Preisig	All
(Germany) Lubner Motorsport	Opel Astra TCR	36	(Germany) Dino Calcum	1–3
(Germany) Lubner Motorsport	Opel Astra TCR	50	(Germany) Georg Braun	6
(Germany) AC 1927 Mayen e.V. im ADAC (PROsport Performance)	Audi RS3 LMS TCR	18	(South Africa) Sheldon van der Linde	All
(Germany) AC 1927 Mayen e.V. im ADAC (PROsport Performance)	Audi RS3 LMS TCR	19	(Austria) Max Hofer	All
(Austria) HP Racing	SEAT León TCR	22	(Austria) Harald Proczyk	1–6
(Austria) HP Racing	Opel Astra TCR	22	(Austria) Harald Proczyk	7
(Czech Republic) Steibel Motorsport	Volkswagen Golf GTI TCR	23	(Germany) Sebastian Steibel	All
(Czech Republic) Steibel Motorsport	SEAT León TCR	28	(Switzerland) Pascal Eberle	All
(Germany) Aust Motorsport	Audi RS3 LMS TCR	24	(Germany) Robin Brezina	1–3
(Germany) Aust Motorsport	Audi RS3 LMS TCR	25	(Netherlands) Loris Hezemans	4
(Germany) Aust Motorsport	Audi RS3 LMS TCR	26	(Germany) Toni Wolf	5
(Germany) Aust Motorsport	Audi RS3 LMS TCR	29	(Germany) Max Hesse	6–7
(Germany) Aust Motorsport	Audi RS3 LMS TCR	44	(Germany) Sandro Kaibach	All
(Switzerland) TOPCAR Sport	SEAT León TCR	35	(Switzerland) Rudolf Rhyn	1–5
(Switzerland) TOPCAR Sport	SEAT León TCR	37	(Germany) Manuel Brinkmann	6
(Switzerland) TOPCAR Sport	SEAT León TCR	66	(Switzerland) Ronny Jost	All
(Switzerland) TOPCAR Sport	SEAT León TCR	73	(Switzerland) Fredy Barth	7
(Switzerland) Schläppi Race-Tec	Opel Astra TCR	36	(Germany) Dino Calcum	4–7
(Switzerland) Schläppi Race-Tec	SEAT León TCR	78	(Switzerland) Fabian Danz	All
(Netherlands) Certainty Racing Team	Audi RS3 LMS TCR	40	(Netherlands) Dillon Koster	1–5
(Netherlands) Certainty Racing Team	Audi RS3 LMS TCR	54	(Austria) Simon Reicher	1–5, 7
(Netherlands) Certainty Racing Team	Audi RS3 LMS TCR	56	(Netherlands) Jaap van Lagen	7
(Germany) Honda ADAC Sachsen	Honda Civic Type R TCR	41	(Germany) Steve Kirsch	All
(Germany) Honda ADAC Sachsen	Honda Civic Type R TCR	88	(Germany) Moritz Oestreich	All
(Austria) Niedertscheider MSP	SEAT León TCR	42	(Austria) Lukas Niedertscheider	2–7
(Austria) Niedertscheider MSP	SEAT León TCR	83	(Austria) Martin Niedertscheider	1
(Germany) GermanFLAVOURS Racing	Audi RS3 LMS TCR	64	(Germany) Sven Markert	1–5
(Germany) GermanFLAVOURS Racing	Audi RS3 LMS TCR	82	(Germany) Thomas Kramwinkel	1–5
(Finland) Positione Motorsport	Volkswagen Golf GTI TCR	71	(Finland) Juuso-Matti Pajuranta	1–2
Entries ineligible to score points
(Italy) V-Action Racing	Alfa Romeo Giulietta TCR	15	(Italy) Cosimo Barberini	7
(Italy) V-Action Racing	Alfa Romeo Giulietta TCR	16	(Italy) Luigi Ferrara	7
(Switzerland) Young Driver Challenge	SEAT León TCR	32	(Switzerland) Gustavo Xavier	5
(Switzerland) Young Driver Challenge	SEAT León TCR	33	(Switzerland) Oliver Holdener	6
(Switzerland) Young Driver Challenge	SEAT León TCR	34	(Switzerland) Orhan Vouilloz	7
(Switzerland) Rikli Motorsport	Honda Civic Type R TCR	35	(Switzerland) Rudolf Rhyn	7
(Netherlands) Bas Koeten Racing	Audi RS3 LMS TCR	56	(Netherlands) Jaap van Lagen	4
(Netherlands) Bas Koeten Racing	Audi RS3 LMS TCR	57	(Netherlands) Michael Verhagen	4
(Netherlands) Bas Koeten Racing	SEAT León TCR	58	(Netherlands) Rik Breukers	4

== Calendar and results ==
The 2017 schedule was announced on 23 November 2016, with two events scheduled to be held outside Germany. The second Oschersleben round will support the International Series along with ADAC Formula 4, while the rest of the rounds will be part of the ADAC GT Masters weekends.

Rnd.		Circuit	Date	Pole position	Fastest lap	Winning driver	Winning team	Supporting
1	1	(Germany) Motorsport Arena Oschersleben, Oschersleben	29 April	(Switzerland) Kris Richard	(United Kingdom) Josh Files	(United Kingdom) Josh Files	(United Kingdom) Target Competition UK-SUI	ADAC GT Masters; ADAC Formula 4 Championship
1	2	(Germany) Motorsport Arena Oschersleben, Oschersleben	30 April		(Switzerland) Florian Thoma	(Switzerland) Florian Thoma	(Germany) Junior Team Engstler	ADAC GT Masters; ADAC Formula 4 Championship
2	3	(Austria) Red Bull Ring, Spielberg	10 June	(Germany) Dino Calcum	(United Kingdom) Josh Files	(United Kingdom) Josh Files	(United Kingdom) Target Competition UK-SUI	ADAC GT Masters; ADAC Formula 4 Championship; GT4 European Series Northern Cup
2	4	(Austria) Red Bull Ring, Spielberg	11 June		(Germany) Dino Calcum	(United Kingdom) Josh Files	(United Kingdom) Target Competition UK-SUI	ADAC GT Masters; ADAC Formula 4 Championship; GT4 European Series Northern Cup
3	5	(Germany) Motorsport Arena Oschersleben, Oschersleben	9 July	(Netherlands) Niels Langeveld	(Austria) Max Hofer	(Germany) Moritz Oestreich	(Germany) Honda ADAC Sachsen	TCR International Series; ADAC Formula 4 Championship
3	6	(Germany) Motorsport Arena Oschersleben, Oschersleben	9 July		(Netherlands) Niels Langeveld	(Netherlands) Niels Langeveld	(Germany) RacingOne	TCR International Series; ADAC Formula 4 Championship
4	7	(Netherlands) Circuit Park Zandvoort, Zandvoort	23 July	(Austria) Harald Proczyk	(Germany) Sandro Kaibach	(United States) Jason Wolfe	(United States) Team Engstler USA	ADAC GT Masters
4	8	(Netherlands) Circuit Park Zandvoort, Zandvoort	23 July		(Netherlands) Niels Langeveld	(Netherlands) Niels Langeveld	(Germany) RacingOne	ADAC GT Masters
5	9	(Germany) Nürburgring, Nürburg	6 August	(Germany) Mike Halder	(Germany) Mike Halder	(United Kingdom) Josh Files	(United Kingdom) Target Competition UK-SUI	ADAC GT Masters; ADAC Formula 4 Championship
5	10	(Germany) Nürburgring, Nürburg	6 August		(Germany) Mike Halder	(Finland) Antti Buri	(Finland) LMS Racing	ADAC GT Masters; ADAC Formula 4 Championship
6	11	(Germany) Sachsenring, Hohenstein-Ernstthal	17 September	(Germany) Luca Engstler	(South Africa) Sheldon van der Linde	(South Africa) Sheldon van der Linde	(Germany) AC 1927 Mayen e.V. im ADAC	ADAC GT Masters; ADAC Formula 4 Championship
6	12	(Germany) Sachsenring, Hohenstein-Ernstthal	17 September		(South Africa) Sheldon van der Linde	(United Kingdom) Josh Files	(United Kingdom) Target Competition UK-SUI	ADAC GT Masters; ADAC Formula 4 Championship
7	13	(Germany) Hockenheimring, Hockenheim	24 September	(Austria) Harald Proczyk	(Austria) Harald Proczyk	(Austria) Harald Proczyk	(Austria) HP Racing	ADAC GT Masters; ADAC Formula 4 Championship
7	14	(Germany) Hockenheimring, Hockenheim	24 September		(Germany) Steve Kirsch	(United Kingdom) Josh Files	(United Kingdom) Target Competition UK-SUI	ADAC GT Masters; ADAC Formula 4 Championship

== Championship standings ==
=== Drivers' Championship ===
Scoring systems

Position	1st	2nd	3rd	4th	5th	6th	7th	8th	9th	10th	11th	12th	13th	14th	15th	16th	17th	18th	19th	20th	PP	FL
Points	40	36	32	29	26	23	20	18	16	14	12	10	8	7	6	5	4	3	2	1	5	1

Pos.	Driver	OSC (Germany)		RBR (Austria)		OSC (Germany)		ZAN (Netherlands)		NÜR (Germany)		SAC (Germany)		HOC (Germany)		Pts.
1	(United Kingdom) Josh Files	1	3	1	1	10	2	3	14	1^{3}	Ret	4	1	10	1	411
2	(Germany) Mike Halder	15	Ret	2^{5}	3	14	8	15^{2}	4	2^{1}	4	3	2	2^{4}	4	346
3	(South Africa) Sheldon van der Linde	3	5	6	9	Ret	DNS	26	2	8	2	1^{3}	5	4^{2}	5	315
4	(Austria) Harald Proczyk	13	10	10	36	9	5	21^{1}	7	6	3	2^{2}	7	1^{1}	11	279
5	(Netherlands) Niels Langeveld	12	Ret	12	Ret	6	1	13	1	3^{2}	5	9	13	6	3	276
6	(Germany) Moritz Oestreich	Ret	37	13^{4}	2	1	4	Ret	17	9	8	5^{4}	11	Ret	12	205
7	(Germany) Steve Kirsch	2	12	4^{3}	29	12	Ret	19^{4}	5	7	Ret	Ret^{5}	4	3^{3}	24	205
8	(Finland) Antti Buri	34	8	5	6			18^{3}	16	5	1	7	9	7	30	202
9	(Switzerland) Pascal Eberle	6	6	30	25	2	10	28	8	13	12	11	12	12	6	187
10	(Switzerland) Kris Richard	4	7	22^{2}	4	31	13	Ret	12	12	26	8	3	8	Ret	178
11	(Austria) Max Hofer	8	22	18	17	7	7	14	11	10	23	10	10	11	2	177
12	(Germany) Luca Engstler	17	16	Ret	34	3	3	16^{5}	9	15	11	19^{1}	6	5^{5}	20	175
13	(Germany) Sandro Kaibach	11	9	7	7	11	12	23	6	14^{5}	6	13	22	9	Ret	168
14	(Switzerland) Florian Thoma	10	1	11	18	4	9	Ret	Ret	21	13	20	8	14	10	164
15	(Germany) Tim Zimmermann	7	2	Ret	15	5	11	17	30	11	29	6	26	30	31	141
16	(Germany) Dino Calcum	19	13	3^{1}	5	15	14	27	15	4^{4}	Ret	15	Ret	13	DNS	137
17	(United Kingdom) Alex Morgan	16	14	9	Ret	18	16	4	10	25	Ret	12	Ret	28	9	110
18	(United States) Jason Wolfe	Ret	20	Ret	14	16	30	1	3	Ret	18	14	24	34	15	102
19	(Germany) Tom Lautenschlager	9	11	Ret	13	17	6	Ret	19	18	15	18	14	16	16	95
20	(Austria) Jürgen Schmarl	5	18	8	Ret	Ret	Ret	25	24	31	7	16	15	22	22	81
21	(Finland) Niko Kankkunen	23	26	Ret	32	Ret	17	7	23	Ret	19	27	18	15	8	59
22	(Portugal) José Rodrigues	20	4	28	8	13	21	DNS	DNS	20	Ret					57
23	(Switzerland) Ronny Jost	Ret	23	21	12	23	15	8	21	32	Ret	17	20	20	Ret	46
24	(Austria) Lukas Niedertscheider	WD	WD	15	16	8	Ret	DNS	Ret	Ret	28	21	16	21	18	41
25	(Germany) Thomas Kramwinkel	24	21	27	21	20	26	5	26	23	16					35
26	(Germany) Kai Jordan	18	15	16	23	29	18	DNS	13	Ret	14					32
27	(Switzerland) Fabian Danz	25	32	24	20	32	20	22	Ret	17	9	22	21	Ret	19	28
28	(Austria) Simon Reicher	Ret	19	14	22	24	28	10	22	26	20			26	29	28
29	(Finland) Juuso-Matti Pajuranta	14	17	17	11											27
30	(Poland) Gosia Rdest	31	27	Ret	30	22	Ret	6	Ret	DNS	DNS					26
31	(Switzerland) Jasmin Preisig	22	30	31	19	33	Ret	Ret	Ret	16	10	25	27	33	DNS	21
32	(Germany) Robin Brezina	Ret	33	20	10	19	31									17
33	(Netherlands) Maurits Sandberg	28	35	25	28			11	25	28	21	32	30	27	28	16
34	(Netherlands) Dillon Koster	32	Ret	19	26	27	25	12	Ret	29	22					16
35	(Switzerland) Fredy Barth													18	14	12
36	(Netherlands) Jaap van Lagen													31	13	10
37	(Germany) Toni Wolf									19	17					6
38	(Netherlands) Loris Hezemans							29	18							3
39	(Germany) Manuel Brinkmann											31	19			3
40	(Sweden) Simon Larsson	27	25	26	31	Ret	22	20	28	Ret	30	23	29	29	Ret	3
41	(Switzerland) Rudolf Rhyn	29	Ret	23	33	21	19	Ret	Ret	22	Ret					2
42	(Germany) Sebastian Steibel	21	24	29	27	28	27	WD	WD	24	24	28	23	24	23	1
43	(Germany) Max Hesse											24	28	23	25	0
44	(Netherlands) Floris Dullaart					30	23									0
45	(Germany) Stefan Goede	26	34	Ret	24	25	29	30	29	27	27	29	Ret	25	27	0
46	(Germany) Sven Markert	35	29	Ret	35	26	24	24	27	Ret	Ret					0
47	(Germany) Georg Braun											26	25			0
48	(Denmark) Kristian Poulsen	30	28													0
49	(Austria) Martin Niedertscheider	33	31													0
50	(Denmark) Roland Poulsen	Ret	36													0
-	(Switzerland) Urs Sonderegger	WD	WD													0
Ineligible for points
	(Netherlands) Rik Breukers							2	20							0
	(Italy) Luigi Ferrara													17	7	0
	(Netherlands) Michael Verhagen							9	Ret							0
	(Switzerland) Rudolf Rhyn													19	17	0
	(Switzerland) Oliver Holdener											30	17			0
	(Italy) Cosimo Barberini													Ret	21	0
	(Switzerland) Gustavo Xavier									30	25					0
	(Switzerland) Orhan Vouilloz													32	26	0
	(Netherlands) Jaap van Lagen							DNS	DNS							0
Pos.	Driver	OSC (Germany)		RBR (Austria)		OSC (Germany)		ZAN (Netherlands)		NÜR (Germany)		SAC (Germany)		HOC (Germany)		Pts.

=== Teams' Championship ===
Pos.	Team	OSC (Germany)		RBR (Austria)		OSC (Germany)		ZAN (Netherlands)		NÜR (Germany)		SAC (Germany)		HOC (Germany)		Pts.
1	(United Kingdom) Target Competition UK-SUI	1	3	1	1	10	2	3	12	1	26	4	1	8	1	424
3	(Germany) AC 1927 Mayen e.V. im ADAC (PROsport Performance)	3	5	6	9	7	7	14	2	8	2	1	5	4	2	378
4	(Switzerland) Wolf-Power Racing 2	15	14	2	3	14	8	4	4	2^{1}	4	3	2	2	4	376
4	(Germany) Honda ADAC Sachsen	2	12	4	2	1	4	19	5	7	8	5	4	3	12	361
5	(Germany) RacingOne	12	15	12	23	6	1	13	1	3	5	9	13	6	3	306
6	(Austria) HP Racing	13	10	10	36	9	5	21^{1}	7	6	3	2	7	1^{1}	11	290
7	(Germany) Junior Team Engstler	10	1	11	18	3	3	16	9	15	11	19^{1}	6	5	10	272
8	(Finland) LMS Racing	23	8	5	6	Ret	17	7	16	5	1	7	9	7	8	269
9	(Czech Republic) Steibel Motorsport	6	6	29	25	2	10	28	8	13	12	11	12	12	6	222
10	(Italy) Target Competition GER	7	2	Ret	13	5	6	17	19	11	15	6	14	16	16	218
11	(Germany) Aust Motorsport	11	9	7	7	11	12	23	6	14	6	13	22	9	25	209
12	(Italy) Target Competition AUT-POR	5	4	8	8	13	21	25	24	20	7	16	15	22	22	180
13	(United States) Team Engstler USA	26	20	Ret	14	16	29	1	3	27	18	14	24	25	15	140
14	(Germany) Lubner Motorsport	19	13	3^{1}	5	15	14	Ret	Ret	16	10	25	25	33	DNS	132
15	(Switzerland) Schläppi Race-Tec	25	32	24	20	32	20	22	15	4	9	15	21	13	19	121
16	(Switzerland) TOPCAR Sport	29	23	21	12	21	15	8	21	22	Ret	17	19	18	14	107
17	(Netherlands) Certainty Racing Team	32	19	14	22	24	25	10	22	26	20			26	13	76
18	(Germany) GermanFLAVOURS Racing	24	21	27	21	20	24	5	26	23	16					70
19	(Austria) Niedertscheider Motorsport	33	31	15	16	8	Ret	DNS	Ret	Ret	28	21	16	21	18	67
20	(Italy) Target Competition POL-SWE	27	25	26	30	22	22	6	28	Ret	30	23	29	29	Ret	55
21	(Germany) RacingOne 2	28	35	25	28	30	23	11	25	28	21	32	30	27	28	47
22	(Finland) Positione Motorsport	14	17	17	11											42
23	(Denmark) Team Engstler Dänemark	30	28													1
-	(Switzerland) Wolf-Power Racing	WD	WD													0
Ineligible for points
	(Netherlands) Bas Koeten Racing 2							2	20							0
	(Italy) V-Action Racing													17	7	0
	(Netherlands) Bas Koeten Racing							9	Ret							0
	(Switzerland) Rikli Motorsport													19	17	0
	(Switzerland) Young Driver Challenge									30	25	30	17	32	26	0
Pos.	Team	OSC (Germany)		RBR (Austria)		OSC (Germany)		ZAN (Netherlands)		NÜR (Germany)		SAC (Germany)		HOC (Germany)		Pts.
