= 2016 SEAT León Eurocup =

The 2016 SEAT León Eurocup was the sixth and final season of the SEAT León Eurocup.

== Teams and drivers ==
Team	No.	Drivers	Rounds
(Spain) PCR Sport	1	(Spain) Mikel Azcona	1-4
(Spain) PCR Sport	17	(Costa Rica) Mauricio Hernandez	1-3
(Spain) PCR Sport	20	(Portugal) Lourenco Beirao Da Veiga	1-4
(Switzerland) Jimmy Antunes	2	(Switzerland) Jimmy Antunes	1-3
(France) Julien Briché	3	(France) Julien Briché	1-3
(United Kingdom) Zest Racecar Engineering	4	(United Kingdom) Lucas Orrock	1-2
(Switzerland) Wolf-Power Racing	4	(United Kingdom) Lucas Orrock	3-4
(Switzerland) Wolf-Power Racing	5	(United Kingdom) Alex Morgan	1-4
(France) Lucile Cypriano	9	(France) Lucile Cypriano	1-4
(Spain) Baporo Motorsport	10	(Netherlands) Niels Langeveld	1-4
(Spain) Baporo Motorsport	13	(Andorra) Amalia Vinyes	1, 3
(Spain) Baporo Motorsport	13	(Spain) Pol Rosell	2
(Spain) Baporo Motorsport	44	(Argentina) Facundo Della Motta	1-4
(Spain) Baporo Motorsport	99	(Netherlands) Maurits Sandberg	1-4
(Spain) Monlau Competicion	11	(Thailand) Munkong Sathienthirakul	4
(France) Marie Baus-Coppens	21	(France) Marie Baus-Coppens	1-4
(Norway) Stian Paulsen Racing	34	(Norway) Stian Paulsen	1-4
(France) Nelson Lukes	50	(France) Nelson Lukes	1, 3-4
(Spain) SEAT Sport	97	(Portugal) Antonio Coimbra	1
(Italy) Gruppo Piloti Forlivesi	101	(Italy) Jonathan Giacon	4
(Italy) Gruppo Piloti Forlivesi	115	(Italy) Kevin Giacon	4
South Italy RT	102	(Italy) Andrea Argenti	4
(Italy) LMR	103	(Italy) Raffaele Gurrieri	4
(Italy) NOS	105	(Italy) Nello "Magister" Natalon (Italy) Massimiliano Chini	4
(Italy) BD Racing	107	(Italy) Guido Buratti	4
(Italy) BD Racing	192	(Italy) Carlota Fedelli	4
(Italy) Pit Lane Competizioni	108	(Italy) Nicola Baldan	4
(Italy) Pit Lane Competizioni	112	(Italy) Alberto Vescovi	4
(Italy) BF Motorsport	110	(Italy) Daniele Verrocchio (Italy) Vincenzo Montalbano	4
(Italy) BF Motorsport	111	(Italy) Carlo Alberto Forte (Italy) Emiliano Giorgi	4
(Italy) Esse Motorsport	114	(Italy) Massimiliano Gagliano	4
(Italy) Grand Prix Race	119	(Italy) Claudio Formenti	4
(Italy) BRC Racing Team	136	(Italy) Alberto Biraghi	4
(Italy) Franco Fumi	169	(Italy) Franco Fumi	4
SEAT Motorsport Italy	198	(Italy) Alessandra Neri (Italy) Lorenzo Baroni	4

== Race calendar and results ==
Round		Circuit	Date	Pole position	Fastest lap	Race winner	Winning team
1	R1	(Portugal) Autódromo do Estoril	23 April	(Spain) Mikel Azcona	(Spain) Mikel Azcona	(Spain) Mikel Azcona	(Spain) PCR Sport
1	R2	(Portugal) Autódromo do Estoril	24 April		(France) Lucile Cypriano	(Norway) Stian Paulsen	(Norway) Stian Paulsen Racing
2	R1	(United Kingdom) Silverstone Circuit	14 May	(Netherlands) Niels Langeveld	(Spain) Mikel Azcona	(Netherlands) Niels Langeveld	(Spain) Baporo Motorsport
2	R2	(United Kingdom) Silverstone Circuit	15 May		(United Kingdom) Alex Morgan	(Norway) Stian Paulsen	(Norway) Stian Paulsen Racing
3	R1	(France) Circuit Paul Ricard	4 June	(Netherlands) Niels Langeveld	(Spain) Mikel Azcona	(Netherlands) Niels Langeveld	(Spain) Baporo Motorsport
3	R2	(France) Circuit Paul Ricard	5 June		(Netherlands) Niels Langeveld	(Netherlands) Niels Langeveld	(Spain) Baporo Motorsport
4	R1	(Italy) Autodromo Internazionale del Mugello	16 July	(Netherlands) Niels Langeveld	(Netherlands) Niels Langeveld	(Norway) Stian Paulsen	(Norway) Stian Paulsen Racing
4	R2	(Italy) Autodromo Internazionale del Mugello	17 July		(Spain) Mikel Azcona	(Spain) Mikel Azcona	(Spain) PCR Sport
5	R1	(Austria) Red Bull Ring	10 September	(United Kingdom) Alex Morgan	(Spain) Mikel Azcona	(Netherlands) Niels Langeveld	(Spain) Baporo Motorsport
5	R2	(Austria) Red Bull Ring	11 September		(France) Julien Briché	(France) Julien Briché	(France) JSB Compétition
6	R1	(Germany) Nürburgring	17 September	(Spain) Mikel Azcona	(Spain) Mikel Azcona	(Spain) Mikel Azcona	(Spain) PCR Sport
6	R2	(Germany) Nürburgring	18 September		(France) Julien Briché	(Italy) Sebasti Scalera	(Spain) Baporo Motorsport
7	R1	(Spain) Circuit de Barcelona-Catalunya	5 November	(France) Julien Briché	(Netherlands) Niels Langeveld	(Netherlands) Niels Langeveld	(Spain) Baporo Motorsport
7	R2	(Spain) Circuit de Barcelona-Catalunya	6 November		(France) Julien Briché	(Spain) Mikel Azcona	(Spain) PCR Sport

== Championship standings ==
Pos	Driver	EST (Portugal)		SIL (United Kingdom)		LEC (France)		MUG (Italy)		RBR (Austria)		NÜR (Germany)		CAT (Spain)		Pts
1	(Netherlands) Niels Langeveld	4^{3}	6	**1**^{1}	Ret	**1**^{1}	1	**4**^{1}	4	1^{3}	7	3^{2}	4	1^{3}	5	240
2	(Spain) Mikel Azcona	**1**^{1}	5	2^{2}	6	2^{2}	Ret	15	1	2^{4}	2	**1**^{1}	12	4^{2}	1	226
3	(Norway) Stian Paulsen	2^{5}	1	3	1	5^{5}	5	1^{3}	2	11	4	5	2	2^{5}	Ret	210
4	(United Kingdom) Alex Morgan	5	8	4^{3}	3	3^{3}	4	3^{4}	6	**3**^{1}	3	2^{5}	Ret	5^{4}	6	173
5	(France) Julien Briché	3^{4}	9	6	Ret	4^{4}	2			12	1	4^{4}	3	**3**^{1}	2	151
6	(Portugal) Lourenço Beirão da Veiga	Ret^{2}	7	7^{4}	2	6	7	2^{2}	10	7	9	10	13	Ret	4	94
7	(United Kingdom) Lucas Orrock	Ret	12	11	Ret	8	6	5	3	6	5	7	11	7	7	73
8	(Argentina) Facundo Della Motta	6	4	8	5	Ret	11	7	8	9	10	6	8	8	12	63
9	(France) Lucile Cypriano	7	2	5	4	Ret	3	DNS	DNS	DNS	DNS	DNS	DNS	DNS	DNS	61
10	(Austria) Mario Dablander									4^{5}	8	8^{3}	5			34
11	(Italy) Nicola Baldan							8	5	10	6			Ret	8	27
12	(Italy) Sebasti Scalera											12	1	10	9	25
13	(France) Nelson Lukes	Ret	10			7	9	9	22	8	Ret	9	7	Ret	Ret	23
14	(Thailand) Munkong Sathienthirakul							12	7			13	10	12	3	22
15	(Costa Rica) Mauricio Hernández	9	3	DNS	DNS	DNS	DNS									17
16	(Spain) Faustí Salom									5^{2}	13					14
17	(Netherlands) Maurits Sandberg	8	11	9	8*	10	10	18	15	13	11			11	16	13
18	(Italy) Jonathan Giacon							6^{5}	7							11
19	(Netherlands) Stan van Oord											11	6			8
20	(France) Marie Baus-Coppens	DNS	DNS	DNS	DNS	9	8	16	DSQ	14	14	14	9	15	15	8
21	(Spain) Pol Rosell			10	7											7
22	(Italy) Alberto Vescovi							10	Ret	15	12			9	13	1
23	(Andorra) Amalia Vinyes	11	14			DNS	DNS									1
24	(Switzerland) Jimmy Antunes	Ret	Ret	Ret^{5}	Ret	DNS	DNS									1
25	(Italy) Kevin Giacon							11	Ret							0
26	(Italy) Raffaele Gurrieri							Ret	11							0
27	(Italy) Andrea Argenti							13	12							0
28	(Italy) Massimiliano Gagliano							Ret	13							0
29	(Italy) Franco Fumi							14	21							0
30	(Italy) Nello "Magister" Natalon (Italy) Massimiliano Chini							23	14							0
31	(Italy) Carlota Fedelli							19	16					16	17	0
32	(Italy) Claudio Formenti							17	23							0
33	(Italy) Guido Buratti							22	18							0
34	(Italy) Alberto Biraghi							Ret	19							0
35	(Italy) Carlo Alberto Forte (Italy) Emiliano Giorgi							21	20							0
36	(Italy) Daniele Verrocchio (Italy) Vincenzo Montalbano							EX	Ret							0
Guest drivers ineligible for championship points
	(Spain) David Cebrián													6	18	0
	(Portugal) Antonio Coimbra	10	13													0
	(Italy) Marco Pellegrini													Ret	10	0
	(Spain) Harriet Arruabarrena													17	11	0
	(Spain) Jacobo García													13	19	0
	(Spain) Rubén Martínez													14	14	0
	(Italy) Alessandra Neri (Italy) Lorenzo Baroni							20	17							0
Pos	Driver	EST (Portugal)		SIL (United Kingdom)		LEC (France)		MUG (Italy)		RBR (Austria)		NÜR (Germany)		CAT (Spain)		Pts

Colour	Result
Gold	Winner
Silver	Second place
Bronze	Third place
Green	Points classification
Blue	Non-points classification
Blue	Non-classified finish (NC)
Purple	Retired, not classified (Ret)
Red	Did not qualify (DNQ)
Red	Did not pre-qualify (DNPQ)
Black	Disqualified (DSQ)
White	Did not start (DNS)
White	Withdrew (WD)
White	Race cancelled (C)
Blank	Did not practice (DNP)
Blank	Did not arrive (DNA)
Blank	Excluded (EX)

**Bold** – Pole
Italics – Fastest Lap

- Note: Maurits Sandberg was awarded 5 points for his 8th place finish in Silverstone race 2.
