= Niels Langeveld =

Dutch racing driver (born 1988)

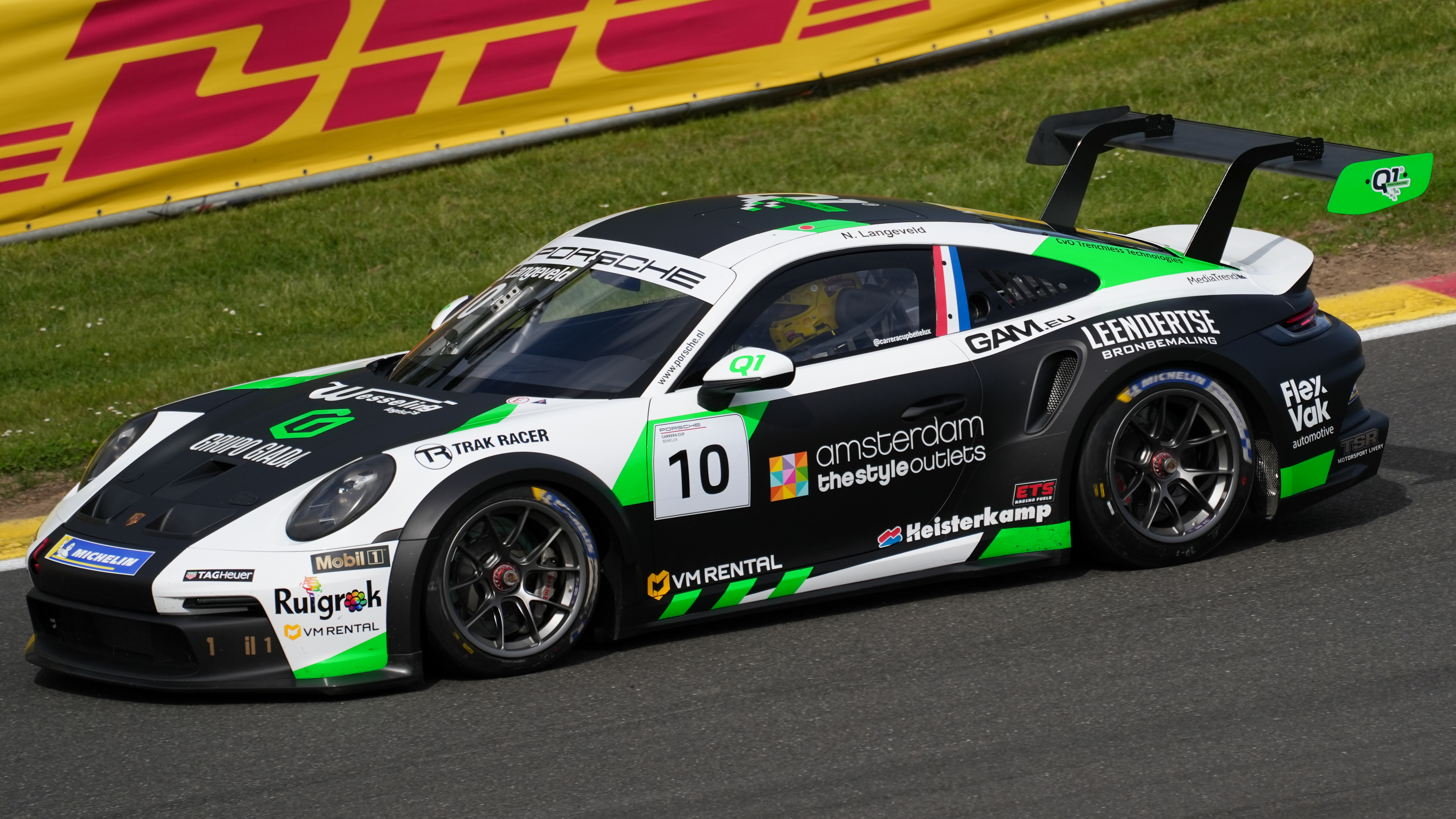
- Langeveld in 2024
- Nationality: (Netherlands) Dutch
- Born: 21 February 1988 (age 38) Sassenheim, Netherlands
- Categorisation: FIA Silver

Championship titles
- 2022 2016 2015 2012 2010: TCR Italy Touring Car Championship; SEAT León Eurocup; Renault Clio Cup Benelux; Renault Clio Cup Nederland; Formido Swift Cup

Niels Langeveld (born 21 February 1988) is a Dutch racing driver who last competed in Porsche Carrera Cup Germany for Laptime Performance.

== Career ==
Langeveld made his car racing debut in 2005, racing part-time in the ELF BRL V6 series. After spending a year out of racing, Langeveld competed in the Formido Swift Cup from 2007 to 2010, finishing no lower than fifth in the standings and winning the title in 2010.

Langeveld then spent two full-time years in Renault Clio Cup Nederland, winning it in 2012 with Certainty Racing Team. Following a one-off return to the series in 2013, Langeveld moved over to Renault Clio Cup Benelux for the following two years, finishing runner-up in points in 2014 and taking the title the following year after taking five wins.

After a one-off appearance at the end of 2015 for Target Competition, Langeveld competed full-time in SEAT León Eurocup for Baporo Motorsport, with whom he would win the title with by beating Mikel Azcona by 14 points.

Stepping up to ADAC TCR Germany for 2017, Langeveld joined RacingOne alongside Kai Jordan and Maurits Sandberg. In his rookie season in the series, Langeveld won at Oschersleben and Zandvoort to finish fifth in points.

Langeveld returned to RacingOne for a second season in ADAC TCR Germany alongside Maurits Sandberg. In his sophomore season in the championship, Langeveld won at the Red Bull Ring and Zandvoort on his way to third in points, behind Luca Engstler and Harald Proczyk.

Joining Audi Sport Team Comtoyou for 2019, Langeveld made his debut in the WTCC alongside Frédéric Vervisch. In his only season in the championship, Langeveld scored a lone podium, coming at the first race of the Suzuka round, where he finished second behind Esteban Guerrieri.

Switching to GT racing for 2020, Langeveld joined T3 Motorsport to race alongside Maximilian Paul in ADAC GT Masters. Finishing 30th in the standings on 22 points, the pair scored a best finish of 11th twice, at both the Sachsenring and the second Lausitzring round.

Returning to TCR competition in 2021, Langeveld joined Sébastien Loeb Racing to compete in TCR Europe. In his only season in the series, Langeveld finished on the podium at Zandvoort and Nürburgring, on his way to third in the overall points and taking the TCR Benelux title. During 2021, Langeveld also competed on a part-time basis in Mazda MX-5 Cup Netherlands, winning race one at Spa and finishing sixth in points.

In 2022, Langeveld joined Target Competition to race in TCR Italy alongside Cesare Brusa and Francesca Raffaele as the sole Hyundai Elantra N TCR in the team. After winning the season-opening race one at Monza, Langeveld went winless in the following two rounds prior to winning race two of the fourth round of the season at Mugello. In the final two rounds of the season, Langeveld won both the opening races of the Imola and Vallelunga rounds, and after finishing third in the final race of the season, Langeveld took the TCR Italy title by 34 points over Salvatore Tavano. Also doing 2022, Langeveld raced in the MX-5 Cup Netherlands and finished runner-up in the standings to Marcel Dekker.

Remaining in TCR Italy for 2023, Langeveld switched to MM Motorsport as the sole driver in the three-car operation to use the then-new FL5 version of the Honda Civic Type R TCR. Winning at Misano and Monza and finishing off the podium only three times, Langeveld ultimately finished runner-up in the points to Franco Girolami in his sophomore year in the series.

Langeveld left Touring Car competition following 2023, as he joined Q1-trackracing to compete in Porsche Carrera Cup Benelux. At the second round of the season at Zandvoort, Langeveld took his maiden podium in the series by finishing second, after having started on pole. Following this, Langeveld scored two more podiums in the final four rounds of the season, on his way to seventh in the standings and contributing to Q1-trackracing's team championship.

Staying in Porsche Carrera Cup Benelux for 2025, Langeveld joined RedAnt Racing for his sophomore season. In the six-round season, Langeveld scored a lone win in the first Zandvoort round and took four more podiums to end the year fourth in points. During 2025, Langeveld also made a one-off appearance in Porsche Supercup for Hadeca Racing at Zandvoort.

The following year, Langeveld joined Laptime Performance to switch to Porsche Carrera Cup Germany. In his first season in the series, Langeveld won the Hockenheimring finale to end the year 11th in overall points.

== Racing record ==
=== Racing career summary ===
Season	Series	Team	Races	Wins	Poles	F/Laps	Podiums	Points	Position
2005	ELF BRL V6		7	0	0	0	0	33	16th
2007	Formido Swift Cup	Certainty Racing Team	??	??	??	??	??	0	NC
2008	Formido Swift Cup	Certainty Racing Team	14	0	0	0	4	143	4th
2009	Formido Swift Cup	Certainty Racing Team	12	3	2	0	5	153	5th
2010	Formido Swift Cup	Certainty Racing Team	14	6	9	7	9	212	**1st**
2010–11	Dutch Winter Endurance Series		2	0	0	0	0	0	NC
2011	Renault Clio Cup Nederland	Certainty Racing Team	14	1	3	0	6	140	4th
2012	Renault Clio Cup Nederland	Certainty Racing Team	13	4	5	5	11	216	**1st**
2013	Renault Clio Cup Nederland		2	0	0	0	1	22	14th
2014	Renault Clio Cup Benelux	Certainty Racing Team	14	5	3	5	8	200	**2nd**
2014–15	Dutch Winter Endurance Series		??	??	??	??	??	18	22nd
2014–15	Dutch Winter Endurance Series – Division 3		2	1	2	0	2	0	NC
2015	Renault Clio Cup Benelux	Certainty Racing Team	11	7	8	5	11	254	**1st**
2015	RCM Cup		??	??	??	??	??	118	7th
2015	SEAT León Eurocup	Target Competition	2	0	0	0	1	7	17th
2016	SEAT León Eurocup	Baporo Motorsport	14	5	3	3	6	240	**1st**
2017	ADAC TCR Germany Touring Car Championship	RacingOne	14	2	1	2	4	276	5th
2017–18	Dutch Winter Endurance Series – Division 1	Niels Langeveld Racing	1	0	0	0	0	0	NC
2018	ADAC TCR Germany Touring Car Championship	RacingOne	14	2	2	4	7	403	**3rd**
2018	TCR Swiss Trophy	RacingOne	2	1	1	1	1	29	16th
2019	World Touring Car Cup	Audi Sport Team Comtoyou	30	0	0	0	1	63	21st
2020	ADAC GT Masters	T3-HRT-Motorsport	14	0	0	0	0	22	30th
2020	Nürburgring Langstrecken-Serie – V5	PROsport Racing	1	0	0	0	0	0	NC
2020	Dutch Winter Endurance Series	Speedlover I	1	0	0	0	0	7	36th
2021	TCR Europe Touring Car Series	Sébastien Loeb Racing	14	0	0	1	2	295	**3rd**
2021	Mazda MX-5 Cup Netherlands		6	1	3	1	3	89	5th
2021	Nürburgring Langstrecken-Serie – SP7	Black Falcon Team TEXTAR	4	0	0	0	0	0	NC
2021	Nürburgring Langstrecken-Serie – SPPRO	Black Falcon Team IDENTICA	1	0	0	0	0	0	NC
2022	TCR Italy Touring Car Championship	Target Competition	12	4	2	2	6	381	**1st**
2022	Mazda MX-5 Cup Netherlands	Tachyon Motorsport-Kolenaar	12	5	5	2	10	216	**2nd**
2022	ADAC TCR Germany Touring Car Championship	Maurer Motorsport	2	0	0	0	1	39	13th
2023	TCR Italy Touring Car Championship	MM Motorsport	12	2	1	7	10	389	**2nd**
2024	Porsche Carrera Cup Benelux	Q1-trackracing	12	0	1	0	3	116	7th
2025	Porsche Carrera Cup Benelux	RedAnt Racing	12	1	1	2	5	181	4th
2025	Porsche Supercup	Hadeca Racing	1	0	0	0	0	0	NC†
2026	Porsche Carrera Cup Germany	Laptime Performance	16	1	0	0	1	86	11th

=== Complete ADAC TCR Germany Touring Car Championship results ===
(key) (Races in bold indicate pole position) (Races in italics indicate fastest lap)

Year	Team	Car	1	2	3	4	5	6	7	8	9	10	11	12	13	14	DC	Points
2017	RacingOne	Audi RS3 LMS TCR	OSC1; 1; 12	OSC1; 2 Ret	RBR; 1; 12	RBR; 2 Ret	**OSC2**; **1**; 6^{1}	OSC2; 2; 1	ZAN; 1; 13	ZAN; 2; 1	NÜR; 1; 3^{2}	NÜR; 2; 5	SAC; 1; 9	SAC; 2; 13	HOC; 1; 6	HOC; 2; 3	5th	276
2018	RacingOne	Audi RS3 LMS TCR	OSC; 1; 2	OSC; 2; 3	MST; 1; 11	MST; 2; 4	**RBR**; **1**; 1^{1}	RBR; 2; 8	NÜR; 1; 3^{4}	NÜR; 2; 11	**ZAN**; **1**; 1^{1}	ZAN; 2; 3	SAC; 1; 6	SAC; 2; 5	HOC; 1; 4	HOC; 2; 2	3rd	403
2022	Maurer Motorsport	Holden Astra TCR	OSC; 1	OSC; 2	RBR; 1	RBR; 2	SAL; 1	SAL; 2	NÜR; 1	NÜR; 2	LAU; 1	LAU; 2	SAC; 1; 2^{6}	SAC; 2; 4	HOC; 1	HOC; 2	13th	19

=== Complete World Touring Car Cup results ===
(key) (Races in bold indicate pole position) (Races in italics indicate fastest lap)

Year	Team	Car	1	2	3	4	5	6	7	8	9	10	11	12	13	14	15	16	17	18	19	20	21	22	23	24	25	26	27	28	29	30	DC	Points
2019	Comtoyou Team Audi Sport	Audi RS 3 LMS TCR	MAR; 1 Ret	MAR; 2; 18	MAR; 3; 18	HUN; 1; 24	HUN; 2 Ret	HUN; 3; 18	SVK; 1; 16	SVK; 2; 8	SVK; 3; 4	NED; 1; 15	NED; 2; 17	NED; 3; 17	GER; 1; 14	GER; 2; 20	GER; 3; 12	POR; 1; 15	POR; 2; 18	POR; 3; 16	CHN; 1; 9	CHN; 2 DNS	CHN; 3 Ret	JPN; 1; 2^{4}	JPN; 2 Ret	JPN; 3; 25†	MAC; 1 Ret	MAC; 2; 16	MAC; 3; 13	MAL; 1; 21	MAL; 2; 15	MAL; 3; 20	21st	63

=== Complete ADAC GT Masters results ===
(key) (Races in bold indicate pole position) (Races in italics indicate fastest lap)

Year	Team	Car	1	2	3	4	5	6	7	8	9	10	11	12	13	14	DC	Points
2020	T3-HRT-Motorsport	Audi R8 LMS Evo	LAU1; 1; 12	LAU1; 2; 21	NÜR; 1; 12	NÜR; 2; 23	HOC; 1; 23	HOC; 2; 19	SAC; 1; 27	SAC; 2; 11	RBR; 1; 12	RBR; 2; 17	LAU2; 1; 11	LAU2; 2; 22	OSC; 1 Ret	OSC; 2 Ret	30th	22

=== Complete TCR Europe Touring Car Series results ===
(key) (Races in bold indicate pole position) (Races in italics indicate fastest lap)

Year	Team	Car	1	2	3	4	5	6	7	8	9	10	11	12	13	14	DC	Points
2021	Sébastien Loeb Racing	Hyundai Elantra N TCR	SVK; 1; 4	SVK; 2; 21†	LEC; 1; 4^{5}	LEC; 2 Ret	ZAN; 1; 4^{9}	ZAN; 2; 2	SPA; 1; 8	SPA; 2; 5	NÜR; 1; 3^{3}	NÜR; 2; 4	MNZ; 1; 10	MNZ; 2; 14	CAT; 1; 6^{6}	CAT; 2; 4	3rd	295

=== Complete TCR Italy Touring Car Championship results ===
(key) (Races in bold indicate pole position) (Races in italics indicate fastest lap)

Year	Team	Car	1	2	3	4	5	6	7	8	9	10	11	12	DC	Points
2022	Target Competition	Hyundai Elantra N TCR	MNZ; 1; 1^{2}	MNZ; 2 Ret	IMO1; 1; 7^{2}	IMO1; 2; 6	MIS; 1; 7^{7}	MIS; 2; 2	**MUG**; **1**; 17^{1}	MUG; 2; 1	IMO2; 1; 1^{2}	IMO2; 2; 4	**VAL**; **1**; 1^{1}	VAL; 2; 3	1st	381
2023	MM Motorsport	Honda Civic Type R TCR (FL5)	IMO1; 1; 3^{3}	IMO1; 2 Ret	MIS1; 1; 1^{3}	MIS1; 2; 3	MUG; 1; 2^{2}	MUG; 2; 25	MNZ; 1; 2^{4}	MNZ; 2; 1	**VAL**; **1**; 20^{1}	VAL; 2; 2	IMO2; 1; 3^{4}	IMO2; 2; 2	2nd	389

=== Complete Porsche Carrera Cup Benelux results ===
(key) (Races in bold indicate pole position) (Races in italics indicate fastest lap)

Year	Team	1	2	3	4	5	6	7	8	9	10	11	12	DC	Points
2024	Q1-trackracing	SPA; 1; 11	SPA; 2; 5	**ZAN**; **1**; 2	ZAN; 2; 16	IMO; 1; 8	IMO; 2; 8	ASS; 1; 11	ASS; 2; 3	RBR; 1; 2	RBR; 2; 12	ZOL; 1; 8	ZOL; 2; 7	7th	116
2025	RedAnt Racing	SPA; 1; 7	SPA; 2; 6	**ZAN1**; **1**; 1	ZAN1; 2; 4	HUN; 1; 3	HUN; 2; 2	ASS; 1; 4	ASS; 2; 6	ZOL; 1; 4	ZOL; 2; 4	ZAN2; 1; 3	ZAN2; 2; 2	4th	181

=== Complete Porsche Supercup results ===
(key) (Races in bold indicate pole position) (Races in italics indicate fastest lap)

Year	Team	1	2	3	4	5	6	7	8	Pos.	Points
2025	Hadeca Racing	IMO	MON	CAT	RBR	SPA	HUN	ZND; 13	MNZ	NC†	0†

=== Complete Porsche Carrera Cup Germany results ===
(key) (Races in bold indicate pole position) (Races in italics indicate fastest lap)

Year	Team	1	2	3	4	5	6	7	8	9	10	11	12	13	14	15	16	DC	Points
2026	Laptime Performance	IMO; 1; 26†	IMO; 2; 10	RBR; 1; 4	RBR; 2; 9	SPA; 1; 9	SPA; 2; 7	ZAN; 1; 11	ZAN; 2; 25	LAU; 1; 20	LAU; 2; 24†	NOR; 1; 4	NOR; 2 Ret	NÜR; 1; 19	NÜR; 2 Ret	HOC; 1; 17	HOC; 2; 1	11th	86
