= SEAT León Eurocup =

- Category: One-make touring car racing
- Country: Europe
- Inaugural season: 2008
- Folded: 2016
- Constructors: SEAT
- Tyre suppliers: Dunlop
- Last Drivers' champion: (Netherlands) Niels Langeveld
- Official website: www.seat-sport.com/eurocup/

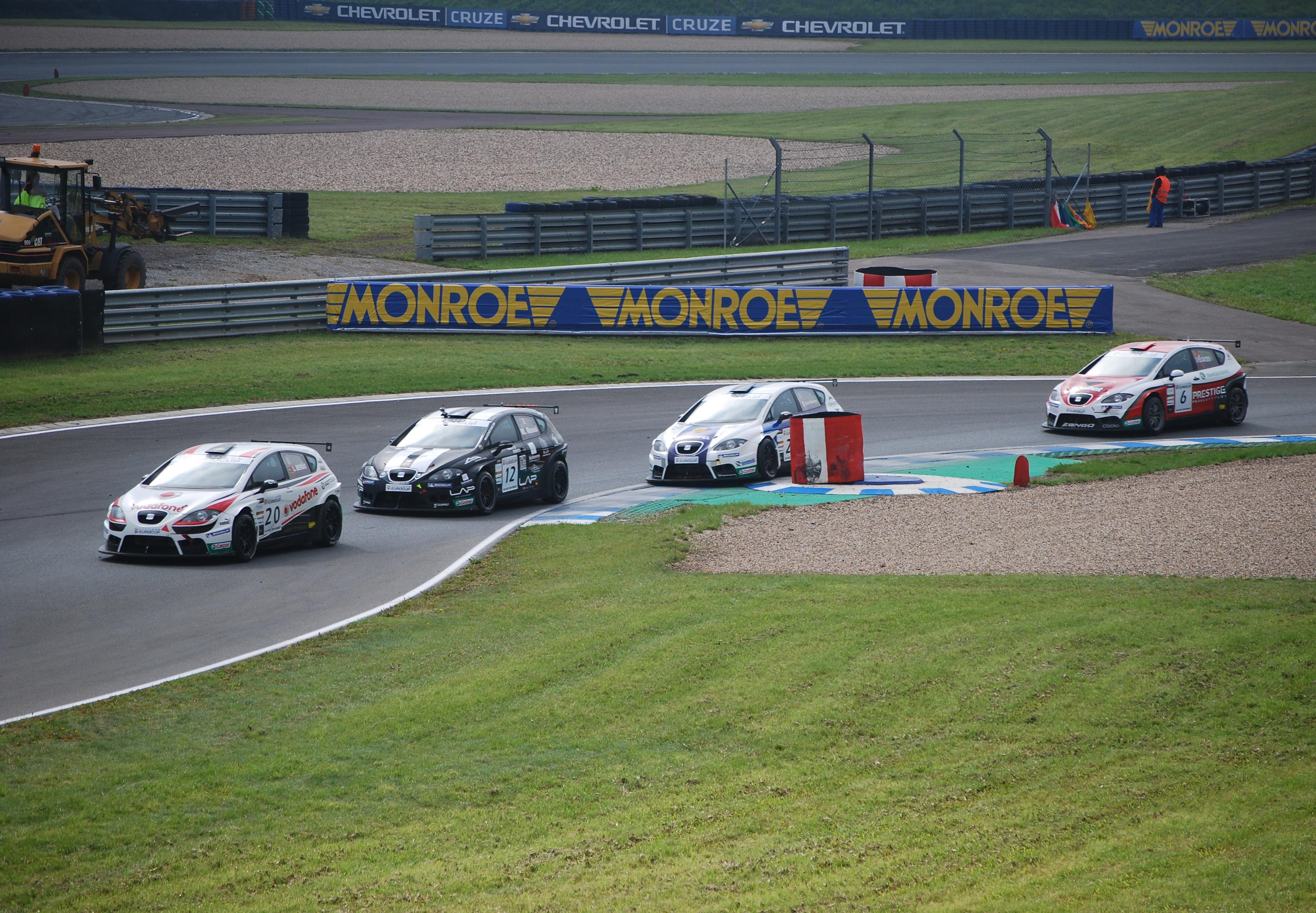

The SEAT León Eurocup was a one-make touring car racing series which uses SEAT Leóns, run by SEAT Sport.

== Background ==
The championship began in 2008, making its debut at Circuit de Valencia, as a support series for the World Touring Car Championship, in which (at the time) SEAT was a leading manufacturer. The organisers offered a prize for the highest points scorer at each race weekend, with the opportunity to race a SEAT León TFSI at the next round of the WTCC for the SUNRED Engineering team. The winner of the championship can participate in the one-off European Touring Car Cup event in a SUNRED-prepared SEAT. The championship was developed from the national SEAT León Supercopa series run in the United Kingdom, Spain, Germany and Turkey since 2003.

== 2014 relaunch ==
Late 2013 SEAT Sport announced that the SEAT León Eurocup will be restarted as a one-make touringcar series from 2014. The series is run on European circuits supporting the International GT Open.

== Car ==
=== 2008-2010 ===
The Eurocup used the same car that made its debut in the Spanish Supercopa series in 2006. They were front-wheel drive and had a 220 kW 4 cylinder, 2 L DOHC turbocharged engine. The cars cost £63,000 to buy for 2009. The series used Pirelli and Yokohama tyres.

=== Seat León Cup Racer 2017- ===
The car is equipped with a turbocharged 2 L direct fuel injection 4 Cylinder engine. The power unit has a maximum power output of approx. 350 PS at 6200 rpm and 420 Nm of torque at 2000 rpm. The power is transmitted to the front wheels using a 6 speed dual-clutch semi-manual DSG gearbox. The front suspension features MacPherson style geometry, while at the rear the car has a Multi-link suspension.

The cost of the car is €95,000 + VAT.

== Race weekend ==
As from 2014 the SEAT León Eurocup weekend is made up of two sprint races of between 50–60 km. Before these there are two 30 minute free-practice sessions and a 30-minute qualifying session which determines the grid for the first race. The grid for the second race is determined by the results of the first race.

The format features standing starts for both races. The drivers are only allowed to use eight marked tires per event (Q+R1+R2).

== Champions ==
Season	Champion	Team
2008	(Spain) Oscar Nogués	(Spain) SUNRED
2009	(Hungary) Norbert Michelisz	(Hungary) Zengő Motorsport
2010	(Hungary) Gábor Wéber	(Hungary) Zengő Motorsport
2011–2013	Not held	
2014	(Spain) Pol Rosell	(Spain) Baporo Motorsport
2015	(Spain) Pol Rosell	(Spain) Baporo Motorsport
2016	(Netherlands) Niels Langeveld	(Spain) Baporo Motorsport
