= Max Hesse =

German racing driver (born 2001)

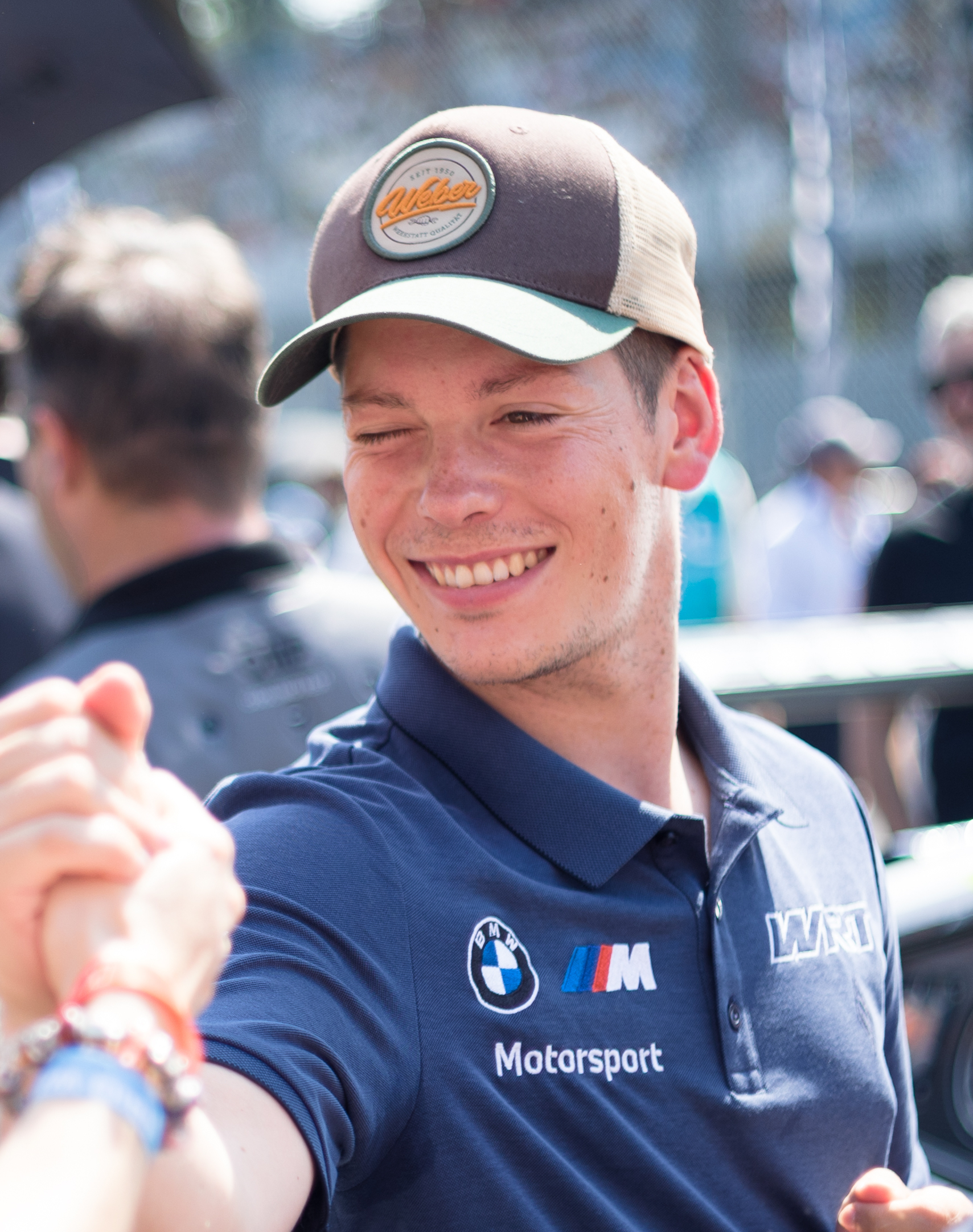
- Hesse in 2026
- Nationality: (Germany) German
- Born: 23 July 2001 (age 25) Wernau, Germany

GT World Challenge Europe Endurance Cup career
- Debut season: 2022
- Current team: ROWE Racing
- Categorisation: FIA Silver (until 2022); FIA Gold (2023–)
- Car number: 998
- Starts: 11 (11 entries)
- Wins: 1
- Podiums: 3
- Poles: 0
- Fastest laps: 1
- Best finish: 10th in 2023

Previous series
- 2020–22 2017–19: Nürburgring Endurance Series; ADAC TCR Germany

Championship titles
- 2019: ADAC TCR Germany

Max Hesse (born 23 July 2001) is a German racing driver driving for ROWE Racing in the GT World Challenge Europe Endurance Cup. He has been part of the BMW M Motorsport works driver stable since 2023.

== Career ==
Hesse began his car racing career in the TCR touring car scene, making his ADAC TCR Germany debut in 2017 before embarking on a full season with PROsport Performance in 2018. Following a sixth-place finish in the standings and the Rookie Trophy title, the German moved to Hyundai Team Engstler ahead of the 2019 season. He took his first podiums in the opening three races before going on a run of four victories in the final eight races, narrowly winning the title against defending champion Harald Proczyk. As a consequence of his title-winning season, Hesse was named the ADAC Junior Motorsportsman of the year.

Hesse switched his focus to the Nürburgring Langstrecken-Serie from 2020 onward as a newly minted BMW junior driver, racing in multiple events in the SP8T and Cup 5 classes. The former would see Hesse attain success, with him winning the 24 Hours of Nürburgring for Walkenhorst Motorsport. In 2021, he and N24-winning teammates Dan Harper and Neil Verhagen went on to drive in the NLS's SP9 category, the highest-placed GT class, under the Team RMG banner. With two wins, the trio finished second in the standings, though they were forced to retire from the Nürburgring 24 Hours.

The trio remained together for the next two years, competing with Rowe Racing in the GT World Challenge Europe Endurance Cup. Their highlight performance came with a second place at the 2023 season-opener at Monza, in the first year which Hesse, Harper, and Verhagen contested as full BMW factory drivers. Further successes included an overall race win in the NLS and a personal success for Hesse, who won the second race of the Road to Le Mans event alongside Valentino Rossi.

Hesse and Harper both returned to the Endurance Cup and Rowe Racing in 2024, this time partnering Augusto Farfus. At the first race in Le Castellet, an impressive performance by both Hesse and Harper enabled the team to come out victorious. Hesse added to his accolades at the end of May by taking pole position for the Nürburgring 24 Hours, making him the youngest polesitter in the history of the race. In a rain-shortened event, Hesse, Harper, and Charles Weerts ended up third.

== Personal life ==
Hesse's career is managed by two-time DTM champion and fellow BMW factory driver Marco Wittmann through his agency 3Eleven Performance. Since 2025, Hesse is a Schaeffler brand ambassador.

== Racing record ==
=== Racing career summary ===
Season	Series	Team	Races	Wins	Poles	F/Laps	Podiums	Points	Position
2017	ADAC TCR Germany	Aust Motorsport	4	0	0	0	0	0	43rd
2018	ADAC TCR Germany	PROsport Performance	14	0	0	0	0	247	6th
2018	GT4 International Cup	Phoenix Racing	1	0	0	0	0	N/A	8th
2019	ADAC TCR Germany	Hyundai Team Engstler	14	4	2	2	9	438	**1st**
2020	Nürburgring Endurance Series - SP8T	FK Performance Motorsport	1	0	0	0	0	11.25	4th
2020	Nürburgring Endurance Series - SP8T	Walkenhorst Motorsport	2	0	0	0	1	11.25	4th
2020	Nürburgring Endurance Series - Cup 5	FK Performance Motorsport	1	0	0	0	0	11.67	28th
2020	Nürburgring Endurance Series - Cup 5	Walkenhorst Motorsport	1	0	0	0	0	11.67	28th
2020	24 Hours of Nürburgring - SP8T	Walkenhorst Motorsport	1	1	0	0	1	N/A	**1st**
2021	Nürburgring Endurance Series - SP9	BMW Team RMG	7	2	0	0	4	39.22	**2nd**
2021	24 Hours of Nürburgring - SP9	BMW Junior Team Shell	1	0	0	0	0	N/A	DNF
2021	24H GT Series - P4	BMW M Motorsport	1	1	0	0	1	0	NC†
2022	GT World Challenge Europe Endurance Cup	BMW Junior Team with ROWE Racing	5	0	0	0	0	36	11th
2022	Nürburgring Endurance Series - SP9	BMW Junior Team	1	0	0	0	0	0	NC†
2022	24 Hours of Nürburgring - SP9	BMW Junior Team Shell	1	0	0	0	0	N/A	DNF
2022-23	Middle East Trophy - GT3	KFC VR46 Team WRT	1	0	0	0	1	0	NC†
2023	24H GT Series - GT3	Team WRT	1	0	0	0	1	0	NC†
2023	Le Mans Cup - GT3	Team WRT	2	1	1	1	2	0	NC†
2023	GT World Challenge Europe Endurance Cup	ROWE Racing	5	0	0	0	1	33	10th
2023	Nürburgring Endurance Series - SP9 Pro	BMW Junior Team	3	1	0	0	2	0	NC†
2023	24 Hours of Nürburgring - SP9	BMW Junior Team	1	0	0	0	0	N/A	DNF
2024	GT World Challenge Europe Endurance Cup	ROWE Racing	5	1	0	1	1	36	8th
2024	Nürburgring Langstrecken-Serie - SP9	BMW M Team RMG	2	0	0	0	0	*	*
2024	24 Hours of Nürburgring - SP9	BMW M Team RMG	1	0	1	0	1	N/A	**3rd**
2024	Italian GT Sprint Championship - GT3	BMW Italia Ceccato Racing	4	2	1	1	3	57	NC†
2024	British GT Championship - GT3	RAM Racing	3	0	0	0	0	0	NC
2024	Intercontinental GT Challenge	BMW M Team RMG	1	0	1	0	1	36	5th
2024	Intercontinental GT Challenge	ROWE Racing	1	0	0	0	1	36	5th
2024	Intercontinental GT Challenge	Team WRT	1	0	0	0	0	36	5th
2024	Nürburgring Langstrecken-Serie - SP3T	FK Performance Motorsport							
2024	GT World Challenge America - Pro	Team WRT	1	0	0	0	0	0	NC†
2025	Middle East Trophy - GT3	Al Manar Racing by Team WRT	1	1	0	0	1	0	NC†
2025	IMSA SportsCar Championship - GTD Pro	Paul Miller Racing	10	2	2	1	4	2984	4th
2025	GT World Challenge Europe Endurance Cup	ROWE Racing	1	0	0	0	0	13	15th
2025	Intercontinental GT Challenge	ROWE Racing	1	0	0	0	0	10	26th
2025	Intercontinental GT Challenge	Team WRT	1	0	0	0	0	10	26th
2025	International GT Open	Racing Trevor	5	0	1	1	0	4	35th
2026	IMSA SportsCar Championship - GTD Pro	Paul Miller Racing	2	1	0	0	1	658	25th
2026	Nürburgring Langstrecken-Serie - SP9	Rowe Racing	1	0	0	0	0	4	NC
2026	24 Hours of Nürburgring - SP9	Rowe Racing	1	0	0	0	1	N/A	**3rd**
2026	GT World Challenge Europe Endurance Cup	Team WRT	5	0	0	0	0	13	19th
2026	GT World Challenge Europe Sprint Cup	Team WRT	10	0	1	0	0	33.5	7th
2026	Italian GT Championship Sprint Cup - GT3	BMW Italia Ceccato Racing	2	1	0	0	1	20	NC†
2026	GT World Challenge Asia	Team KRC	2	0	1	0	1	21	25th
2026	Shanghai 8 Hours	Team KRC	1	1	0	1	1	N/A	**1st**
2026	Intercontinental GT Challenge	Team WRT	2	0	0	0	0	38	10th
2026	Intercontinental GT Challenge	Rowe Racing	1	0	0	0	1	38	10th
2026	Intercontinental GT Challenge	Team KRC	1	0	0	0	0	38	10th
2026-27	Asian Le Mans Series - GT3	Team WRT							

^{†} As Hesse was a guest driver, he was ineligible to score points.* Season still in progress.

=== Complete ADAC TCR Germany Touring Car Championship results ===
(key) (Races in bold indicate pole position) (Races in italics indicate fastest lap)

Year	Team	Car	1	2	3	4	5	6	7	8	9	10	11	12	13	14	DC	Points
2017	Aust Motorsport	Audi RS3 LMS TCR	OSC; 1	OSC; 2	LAU; 1	LAU; 2	RBR; 1	RBR; 2	ZAN; 1	ZAN; 2	NÜR; 1	NÜR; 2	SAC; 1; 24	SAC; 2; 28	HOC; 1; 23	HOC; 2; 25	43rd	0
2018	PROsport Performance	Audi RS3 LMS TCR	OSC; 1; 25†	OSC; 2; 12	MST; 1; 7^{3}	MST; 2; 6	RBR; 1; 8^{3}	RBR; 2; 7	NÜR; 1; 4^{2}	NÜR; 2; 7	ZAN; 1; 8^{5}	ZAN; 2; 21	SAC; 1; 8	SAC; 2; 8	HOC; 1; 9^{4}	HOC; 2; 8	6th	247
2019	Hyundai Team Engstler	Hyundai i30 N TCR	**OSC**; **1**; 2^{1}	OSC; 2; 3	MST; 1; 2^{3}	MST; 2; 5	RBR; 1; 11	RBR; 2; 5	ZAN; 1; 1	ZAN; 2; 9	**NÜR**; **1**; 2^{1}	NÜR; 2; 1	HOC; 1; 2^{3}	HOC; 2; 1	SAC; 1; 8^{5}	SAC; 2; 1	1st	438

=== Complete 24 Hours of Nürburgring results ===
Year	Team	Co-Drivers	Car	Class	Laps	Ovr. Pos.	Class Pos.
2020	(Germany) Walkenhorst Motorsport	(United Kingdom) Dan Harper (United States) Neil Verhagen	BMW M4 GT4	SP8T	78	19th	**1st**
2021	(Germany) BMW Junior Team Shell	(Brazil) Augusto Farfus (United Kingdom) Dan Harper (United States) Neil Verhagen	BMW M6 GT3	SP9	54	DNF	DNF
2022	(Germany) BMW Junior Team Shell	(United Kingdom) Dan Harper (United States) Neil Verhagen	BMW M4 GT3	SP9	86	DNF	DNF
2023	(Germany) BMW Junior Team	(United Kingdom) Dan Harper (United States) Neil Verhagen	BMW M4 GT3	SP9	96	DNF	DNF
2024	(Germany) BMW M Team RMG	(United Kingdom) Dan Harper (Belgium) Charles Weerts	BMW M4 GT3	SP9	50	**3rd**	**3rd**
2026	(Germany) Rowe Racing	(United Kingdom) Dan Harper (South Africa) Sheldon van der Linde (Belgium) Dries Vanthoor	BMW M4 GT3 Evo	SP9	156	**3rd**	**3rd**

=== Complete 24H GT Series results ===
Year	Team	Co-Drivers	Car	Class	1	2	3	Pos.	Class Pos.
2022–23	(Italy) KFC VR46 with Team WRT	(Indonesia) Sean Gelael (Italy) Valentino Rossi (Belgium) Maxime Martin (United Kingdom) Tim Whale	BMW M4 GT3	**Pro**	KUW	DUB; 3	ABU	NC	NC

=== Complete GT World Challenge Europe results ===
==== GT World Challenge Europe Endurance Cup ====
(key) (Races in bold indicate pole position; results in italics indicate fastest lap)

Year	Team	Car	Class	1	2	3	4	5	6	7	Pos.	Points
2022	ROWE Racing	BMW M4 GT3	Pro	IMO; 15	LEC; 4	SPA; 6H; 11	SPA; 12H; 2	SPA; 24H; 5	HOC; 9	CAT; 13	11th	36
2023	ROWE Racing	BMW M4 GT3	Pro	MNZ; 2	LEC; 6	SPA; 6H; 4	SPA; 12H; 53†	SPA; 24H; Ret	NÜR; 11	CAT; 12	10th	33
2024	ROWE Racing	BMW M4 GT3	Pro	LEC; 1	SPA; 6H; 7	SPA; 12H; 17	SPA; 24H; 6	NÜR; 11	MNZ; 27	JED; Ret	8th	36
2025	ROWE Racing	BMW M4 GT3 Evo	Pro	LEC	MNZ	SPA; 6H; 9	SPA; 12H; 1	SPA; 24H; 29	NÜR	CAT	15th	13
2026	Team WRT	BMW M4 GT3 Evo	Pro	LEC; 12	MNZ; Ret	SPA; 6H; 9	SPA; 12H; 8	SPA; 24H; 6	NÜR; 9	ALG; 49	19th	13

==== GT World Challenge Europe Sprint Cup ====
(key) (Races in bold indicate pole position; results in italics indicate fastest lap)

Year	Team	Car	Class	1	2	3	4	5	6	7	8	9	10	Pos.	Points
2026	Team WRT	BMW M4 GT3 Evo	Pro	BRH; 1; 14	BRH; 2; 4	**MIS**; **1**; 6	MIS; 2; 4	MAG; 1; 6	MAG; 2; 9	ZAN; 1; 12	ZAN; 2; 4	CAT; 1; 16	CAT; 2; 38	7th	33.5

=== Complete IMSA SportsCar Championship results ===
(key) (Races in bold indicate pole position; results in italics indicate fastest lap)

Year	Entrant	Class	Make	Engine	1	2	3	4	5	6	7	8	9	10	Rank	Points
2025	Paul Miller Racing	GTD Pro	BMW M4 GT3 Evo	BMW P58 3.0 L Twin Turbo I6	DAY; 12	SEB; 2	LGA; 5	DET; 7	WGL; 1	MOS; 9	ELK; 7	VIR; 10	**IMS**; 3	**PET**; 1	4th	2984
2026	Paul Miller Racing	GTD Pro	BMW M4 GT3 Evo	BMW P58 3.0 L Twin Turbo I6	DAY; 1	SEB; 5	LGA	DET	WGL	MOS	ELK	VIR	IMS	PET	25th	658
