= Volkswagen Golf Mk7 =

Seventh generation of Golf compact car

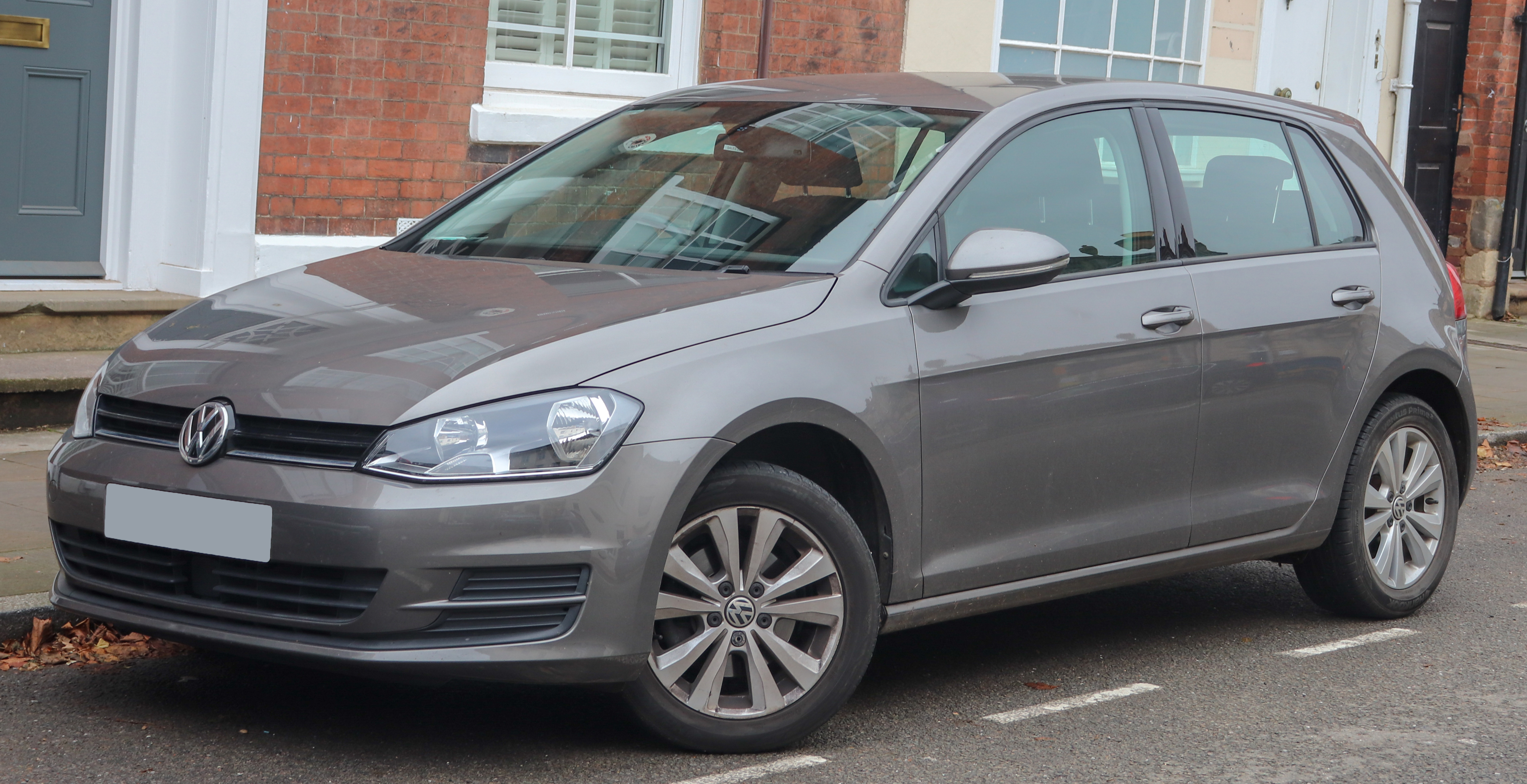

Overview
- Manufacturer: Volkswagen
- Production: 2012–2020 (Europe); 2013–2020 (China); 2015–2020 (Brazil); 2014–2021 (Mexico)
- Model years: 2015–2021 (North America)
- Assembly: Germany: Wolfsburg (Wolfsburg Plant); Zwickau (Zwickau-Mosel Plant); Dresden (Transparent Factory; e-Golf only); China: Changchun; Foshan (FAW-VW); Mexico: Puebla (Volkswagen de México); Brazil: São José dos Pinhais (Volkswagen do Brasil); Indonesia: Jakarta (National Assemblers)
- Designer: Klaus Bischoff, Marc Lichte, Andreas J. Mindt and Philipp Römers; Thomasz Bachorski (interior); Manuela Joosten (trim); Andreu Sola (lights)

Body and chassis
- Class: Compact car/small family car (C)
- Body style: 3/5-door hatchback; 5-door estate
- Layout: Front-engine, front-wheel-drive Front-engine, all-wheel-drive
- Platform: Volkswagen Group MQB
- Related: Volkswagen Golf Sportsvan; Audi A3 Mk3; Audi TT Mk3; SEAT León Mk3; Škoda Octavia Mk3

Powertrain
- Engine: Petrol: 1.0 L EA211 TSI I3; 1.2 L EA211 TSI I4; 1.4 L EA211 TSI I4; 1.5 L EA211 TSI I4; 1.6 L EA211 MSI I4; 1.8 L EA888 TSI I4; 2.0 L EA888 TSI I4; Petrol plug-in hybrid: 1.4 L EA211 TSI I4 (GTE); Diesel: 1.6 L EA288 TDI I4 CR; 2.0 L EA288 TDI I4 CR
- Electric motor: AC electric motor (e-Golf)
- Transmission: 5/6-speed manual; 6/8-speed automatic (Tiptronic); 6/7-speed DSG
- Battery: 35.8 kWh (e-Golf), 8.7kWh (GTE)

Dimensions
- Wheelbase: 2,631–2,637 mm (103.6–103.8 in); 2,619–2,629 mm (103.1–103.5 in) (facelift)
- Length: 4,255–4,280 mm (167.5–168.5 in) (hatchback); 4,562–4,679 mm (179.6–184.2 in) (wagon)
- Width: 1,791–1,799 mm (70.5–70.8 in)
- Height: 1,435–1,514 mm (56.5–59.6 in)
- Kerb weight: 1,205–1,500 kg (2,657–3,307 lb)

Chronology
- Predecessor: Volkswagen Golf Mk6
- Successor: Volkswagen Golf Mk8; Volkswagen ID.3 (for e-Golf)

The Volkswagen Golf (Mk7) is a C-segment car manufactured by German automobile manufacturer Volkswagen. It is the seventh generation in the Golf series and the successor to the Golf Mk6, and was introduced in Berlin on 4 September 2012, before a public launch at the 2012 Paris Motor Show, with European sales beginning in November 2012 for the 2013 model year.

Marketed in three-door and five-door hatchback, van, and estate forms, the Golf Mk7 shares the MQB platform with the third generation Audi A3, SEAT León and Škoda Octavia.

In November 2016, Volkswagen presented a facelift of the Golf Mk7. It was replaced in December 2019 by the Golf Mk8, which is built on the MQB Evo platform. Production of the e-Golf and the Golf Variant ended in mid-2020.

== Overview ==
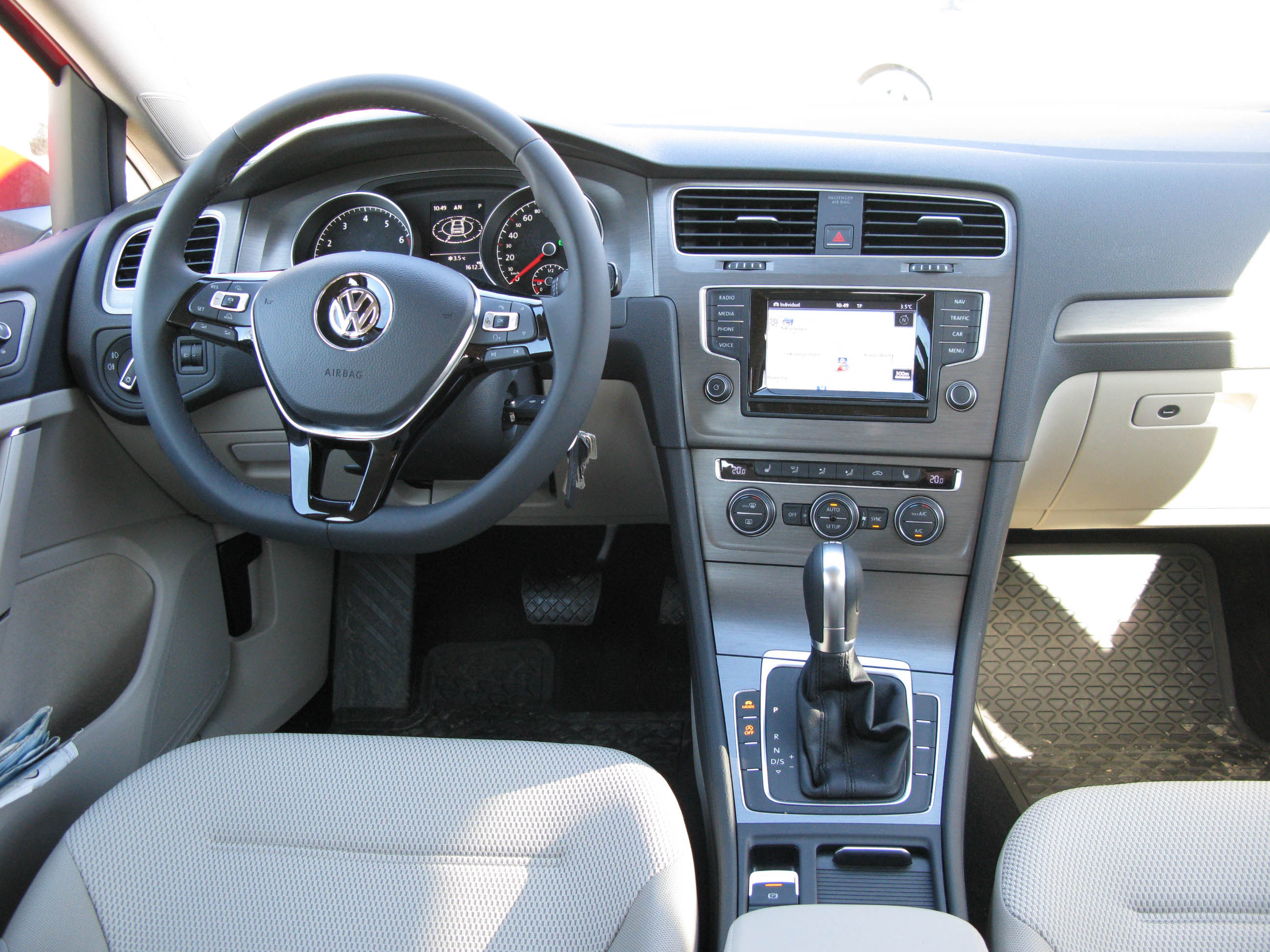
Interior

Compared with the previous generation, the Golf Mk7 has a more spacious cabin, with more shoulder room for front and rear passengers, more rear legroom, and a larger boot. It is 20 mm (0.8 in) wider than the Mk6, with a 59 mm (2.3 in) longer wheelbase.

Engine options at launch include 1.2 and 1.4-litre turbocharged petrol engines, with 85 PS (63 kW; 84 hp) and 140 PS (103 kW; 138 hp) respectively, and 1.6 and 2.0-litre diesel engines, with 105 PS (77 kW; 104 hp) and 150 PS (110 kW; 148 hp) respectively. The 1.6 TDI BlueMotion Concept has a theoretical combined fuel consumption of 3.2 L/100 km (88 mpg_{‑imp}; 74 mpg_{‑US}) and anticipated 85 g/km CO_{2} emissions.

Available body styles are three- and five-door hatchbacks (including high-performance Golf GTI and Golf R models), and a five-door estate (known as the SportWagen in Canada and the United States, first advertised in May 2015). Sales of the three-door hatchback were not as strong as previous generations,, and it was dropped with the launch of the eighth-generation model in late 2019.

A van version based on the three-door Golf was sold only in Ireland to commercial customers and was cancelled as corporations opted for the bigger Volkswagen Caddy.

At launch in the US market, Volkswagen also offered the Golf Sport model. Around 650 of these SE four-door models were built, equipped with a six-speed automatic transmission. Offered in either Pure White or Platinum Gray, the Sport model is visually enhanced with a body kit that includes a front lip spoiler, side skirts, a rear valence, a larger rear spoiler, and chrome exhaust tips.

The Golf went on sale in the UK in early January and was released in Australia in April 2013.

In Brazil, the Golf Mk7 went on sale in September 2013, only in the High-line and GTI trims, along with the Comfortline trim, which was made available from March 2014. All models were imported from Germany until 2015, when local assembly commenced.

When it was introduced in 2013, it won the Car of the Year Japan Award, the first time it was awarded to a European product.

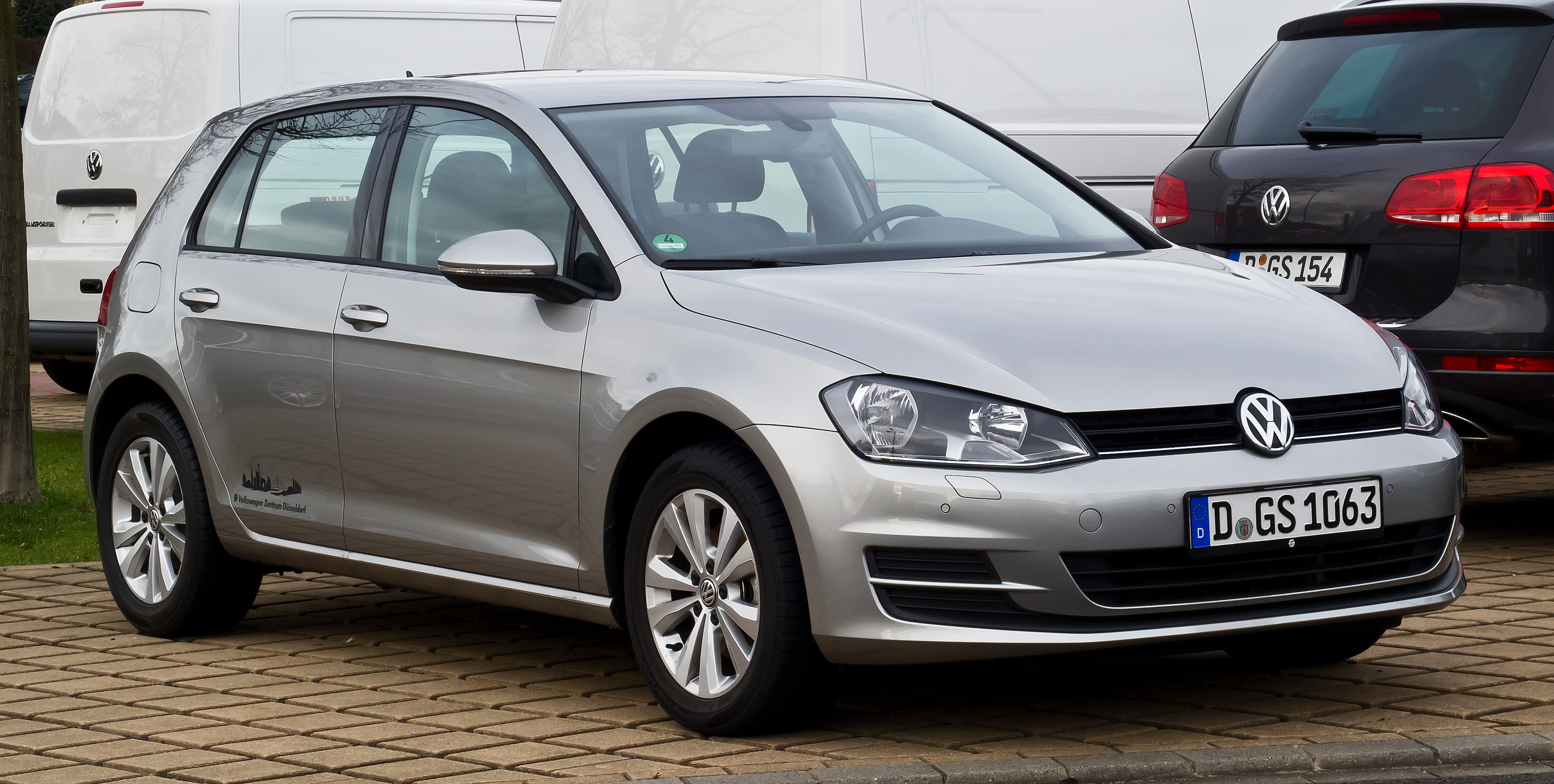
Standard (pre-facelift)

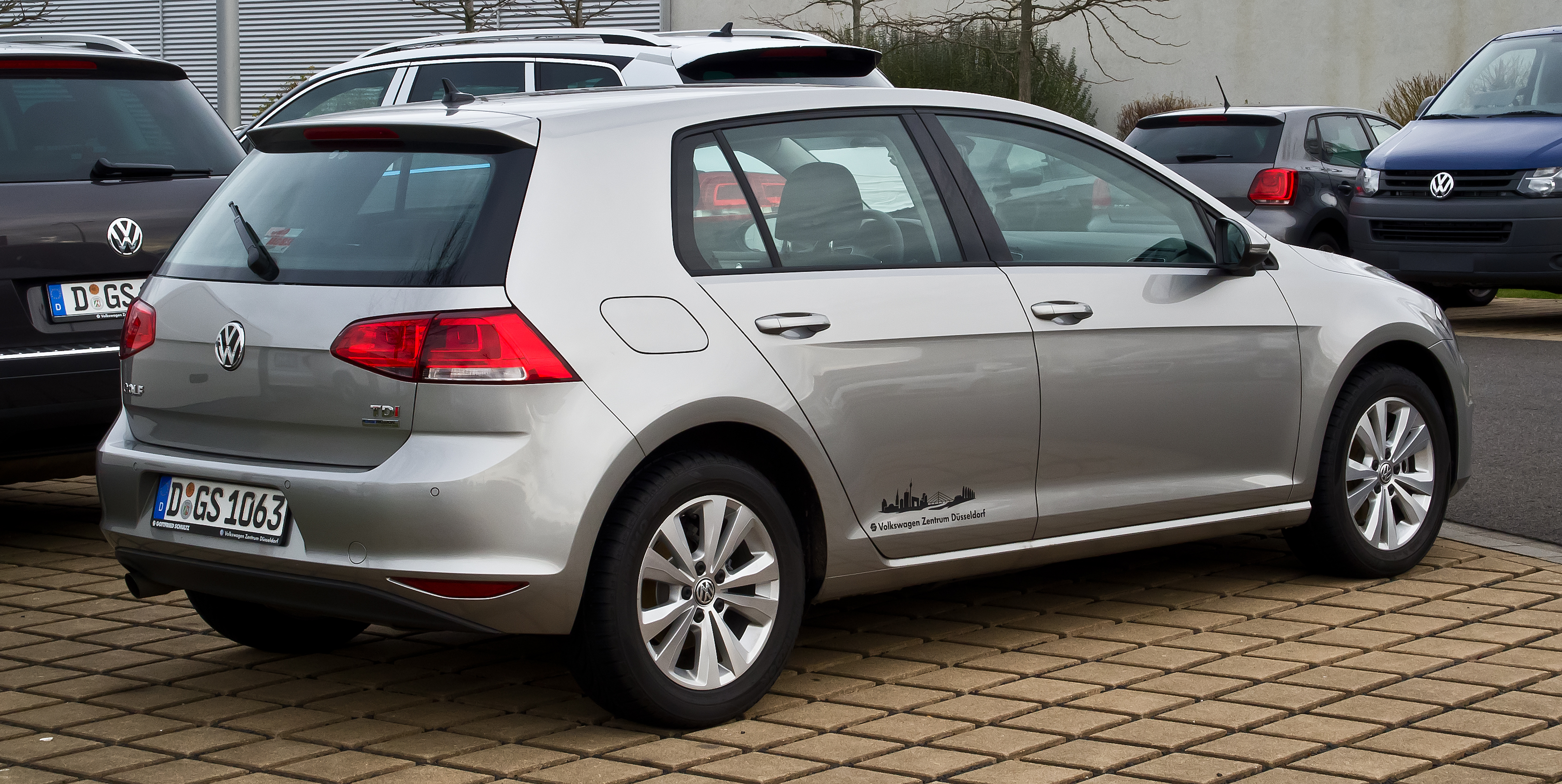
Standard (pre-facelift)

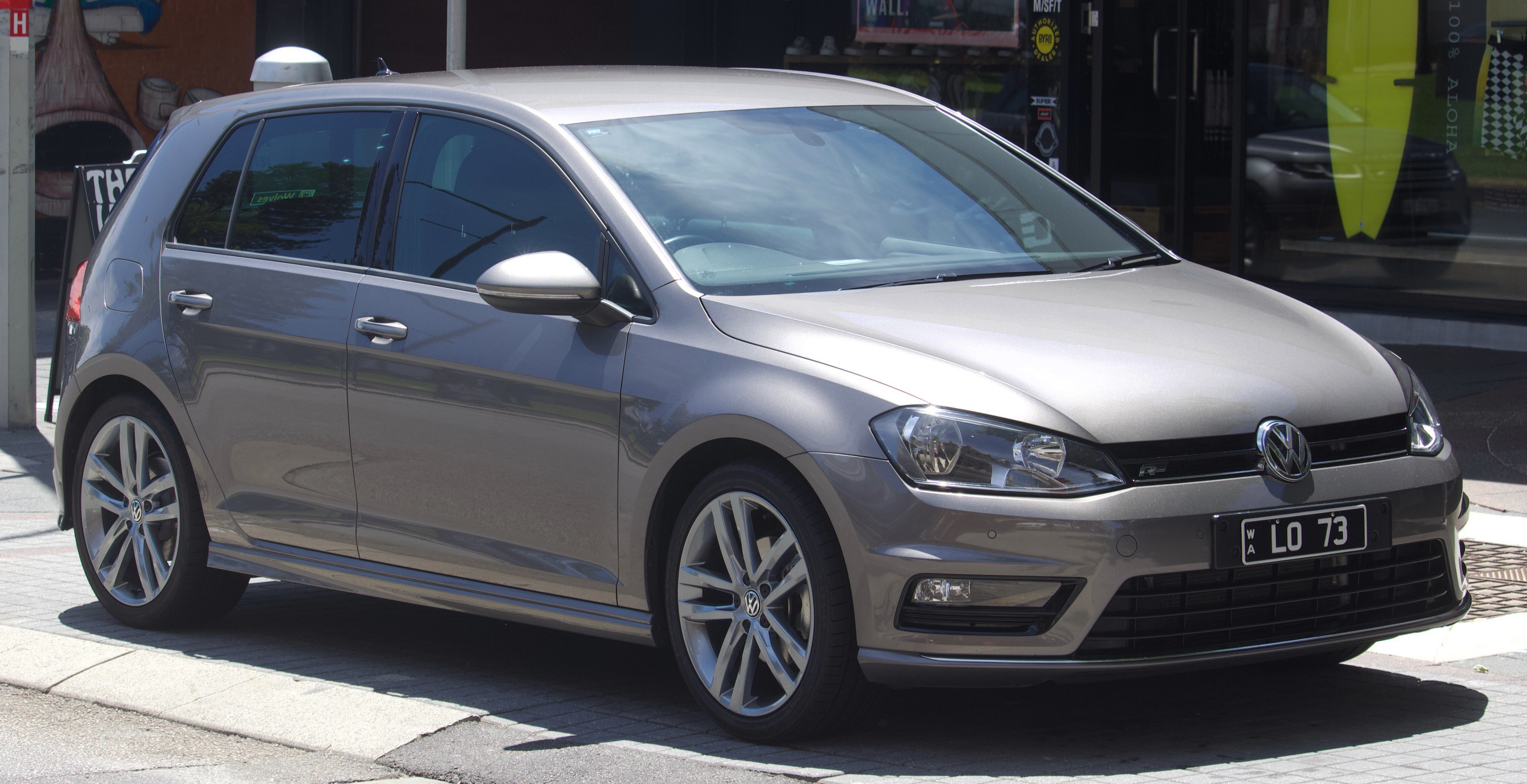
R-Line (pre-facelift)

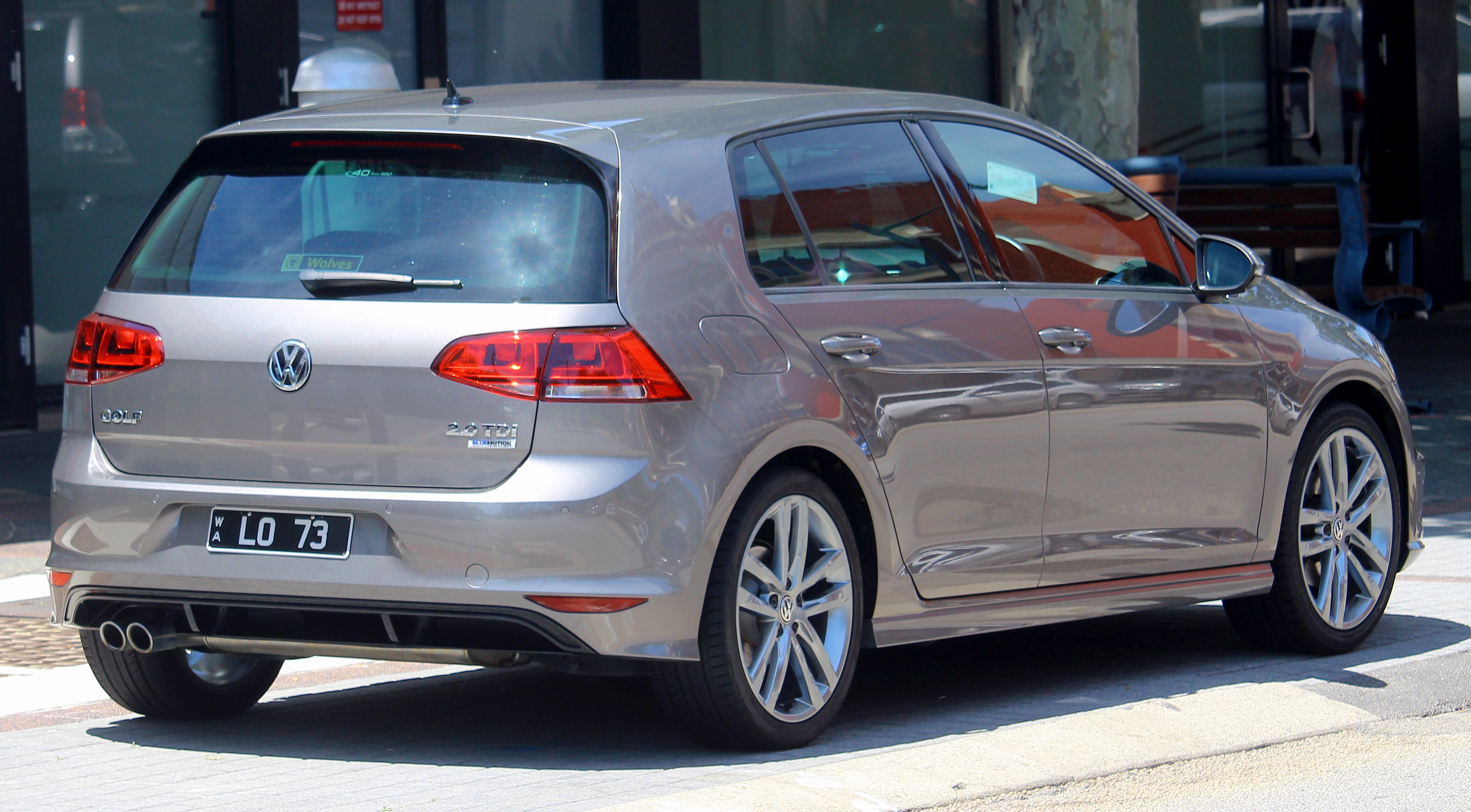
R-Line (pre-facelift)

=== New safety systems ===
- Proactive Occupant Protection
- Multi-collision brake system
- Adaptive cruise control (optional)
- Collision avoidance system (Front Assist) with City Emergency Braking (optional)
- Lane-keeping assistant (optional)
- Driver fatigue detection (optional)
- Traffic sign recognition (optional)
- Automatic parking system (optional)
- Rear assist camera (optional)

== Safety ==
=== ANCAP ===
ANCAP test results Volkswagen Golf all front-wheel-drive variants (2013)
Test	Score
Overall	5 /5 stars
Frontal offset	15.92/16
Side impact	16/16
Pole	2/2
Seat belt reminders	2/3
Whiplash protection	Good
Pedestrian protection	Adequate
Electronic stability control	Standard

ANCAP test results Volkswagen Golf all FWD Golf 7.5 variants (exc. eGolf) (2013)
Test	Score
Overall	5 /5 stars
Frontal offset	15.92/16
Side impact	16/16
Pole	2/2
Seat belt reminders	2/3
Whiplash protection	Good
Pedestrian protection	Adequate
Electronic stability control	Standard

=== Euro NCAP ===
Euro NCAP test results Volkswagen Golf 1.2 TSI Comfortline (LHD) (2019)
Test	Points	%
Overall:	5 /5 stars	
Adult occupant:	34	94%
Child occupant:	43.6	89%
Pedestrian:	23.5	65%
Safety assist:	5	71%

=== Latin NCAP ===
The Golf, in its most basic Latin American market configuration with 7 airbags, received 5 stars for adult occupants and 5 stars for toddlers from Latin NCAP 1.0 in 2014.

Latin NCAP 1.5 test results Volkswagen Golf + 7 Airbags (2014, similar to Euro NCAP 2002)
Test	Points	Stars
Adult occupant:	16.56/17.0	5 /5 stars
Child occupant:	44.30/49.00	5 /5 stars

In 2017, it was awarded 5 stars for adult occupants and 5 stars for toddlers as well as the Advanced Award from Latin NCAP 2.0.

Latin NCAP 2.0 test results Volkswagen Golf VII + 7 Airbags (2017, based on Euro NCAP 2008)
Test	Points	Stars
Adult occupant:	33.30/34.0	5 /5 stars
Child occupant:	43.52/49.00	5 /5 stars

=== IIHS ===
The 2021 Golf was tested by the IIHS:

IIHS scores
Small overlap front (Driver)	Good
Small overlap front (Passenger)	Acceptable
Moderate overlap front	Good
Side (original test)	Good
Roof strength	Good
Head restraints and seats	Good
Headlights	Poor
Front crash prevention (Vehicle-to-Vehicle)	Superior
Front crash prevention (Vehicle-to-Pedestrian, day)	Advanced
Child seat anchors (LATCH) ease of use	Acceptable

== Estate (Golf Variant, Golf SportWagen, and Golf Alltrack) ==
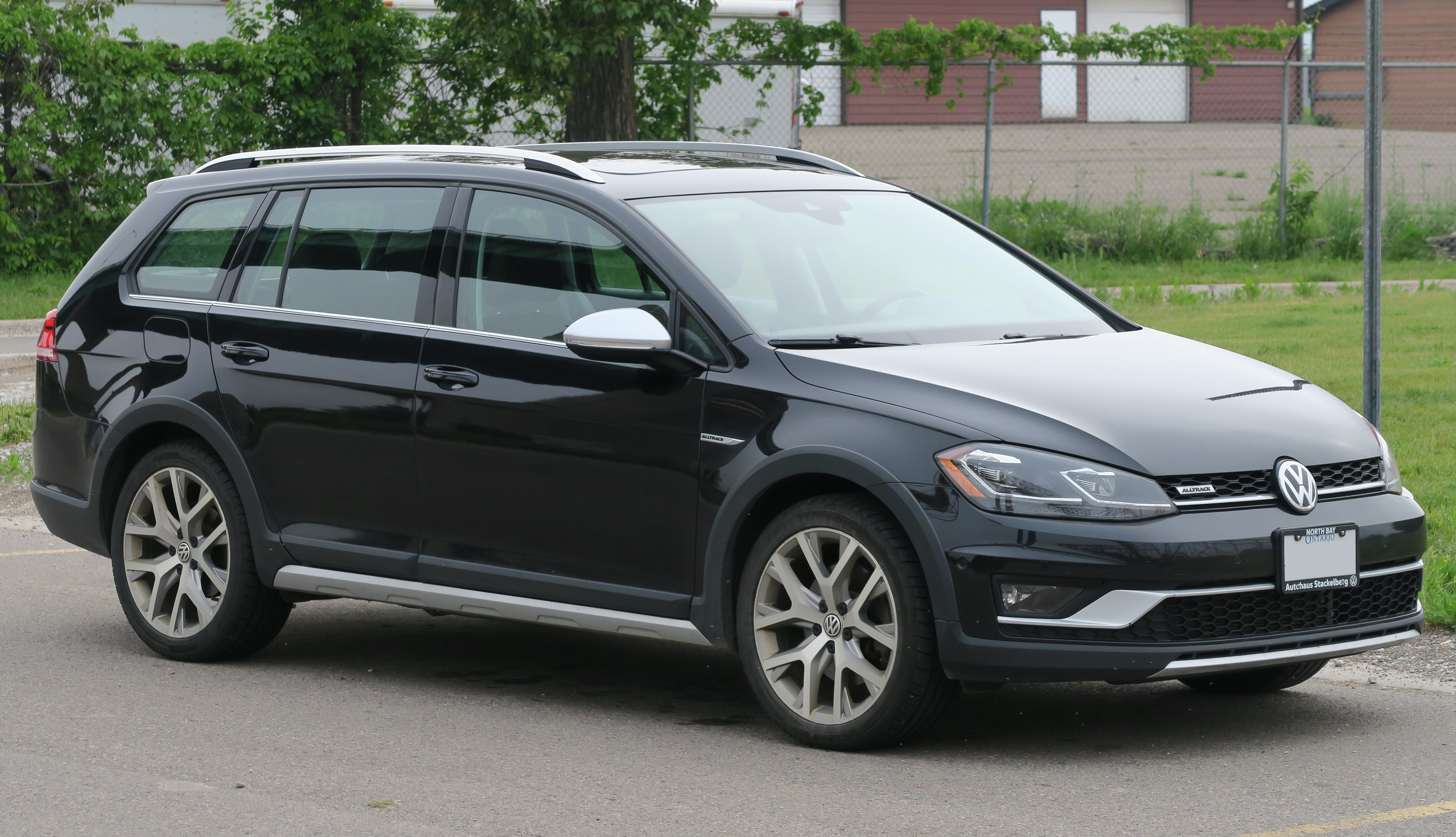
Golf Alltrack

Volkswagen revealed the Golf estate/station wagon at the Geneva Motor Show in March 2013. It was marketed as the Golf Variant in Germany and Golf SportWagen in the United States and Canada, replacing the Jetta SportWagen nameplate previously used in the US.

The Golf Estate's load space volume was expanded from the 505 litres of its predecessor to 605 litres (loaded up to the back seat backrest), versus the 380 litres of the Golf hatchback. Loaded up to the front seat backrests and under the roof, the Golf Estate offered a cargo volume of 1,620 litres (versus the 1,495 litres of the Golf Estate Mk6). The rear seat backrests can be folded remotely via a release in the boot. Four petrol engines and three diesel engines were available, ranging from 85 PS (63 kW; 84 hp) to 140 PS (103 kW; 138 hp) for the standard petrol engines and 90 PS (66 kW; 89 hp) to 150 PS (110 kW; 148 hp) for the diesel engines. For the first time, the Golf Estate was also available as a "full" BlueMotion model, including revised aerodynamics. This model uses a 1.6-litre diesel engine producing 110 PS and a six-speed manual gearbox, and was expected to achieve a combined fuel consumption of 85.6 mpg (equivalent to 87 g/km of CO_{2}).

The Golf R Estate used the same EA888 2.0L engine and all-wheel-drive system as the Golf R hatchback, along with other R-specific features.

The Golf Alltrack was introduced as a ruggedized version of the Golf Estate, with slightly raised suspension, body cladding, a front skidplate, and all-wheel drive, along with other minor mechanical changes.

The Golf SportWagen was available in S, SE, and GT/SEL (Trendline, Comfortline, and Highline in Canada) trim levels and used the same drivetrains as the standard Golf. The Golf Sportwagen was also available with all-wheel drive in the US and Canada beginning with the 2017 model year, using the 1.8L engine with either a 6-speed manual or 6-speed DSG transmission until it was discontinued in 2020. The AWD Sportwagen shared its drivetrain with the Alltrack, though it did not incorporate the other changes made for that submodel.

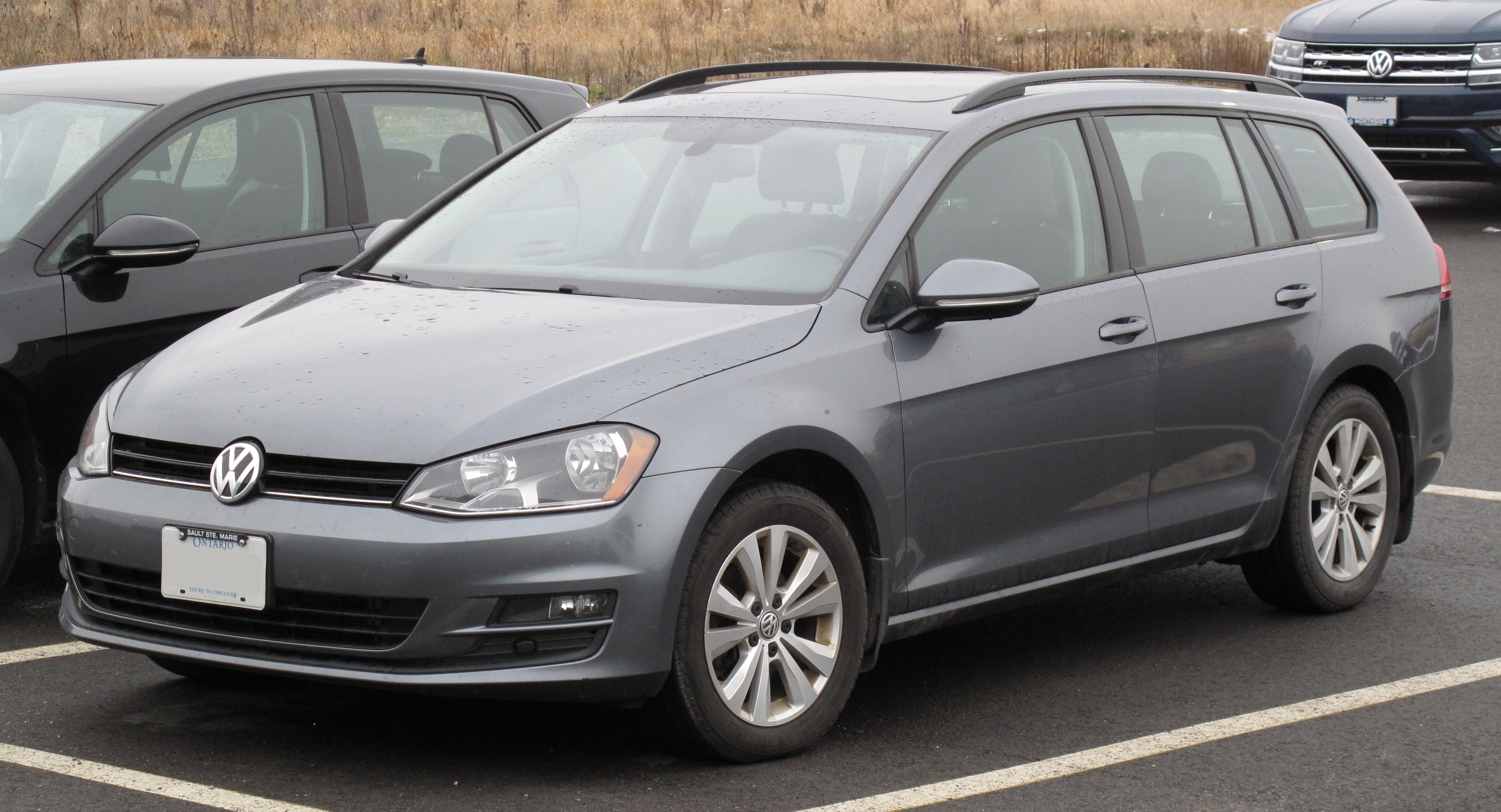
Golf Variant (pre-facelift)

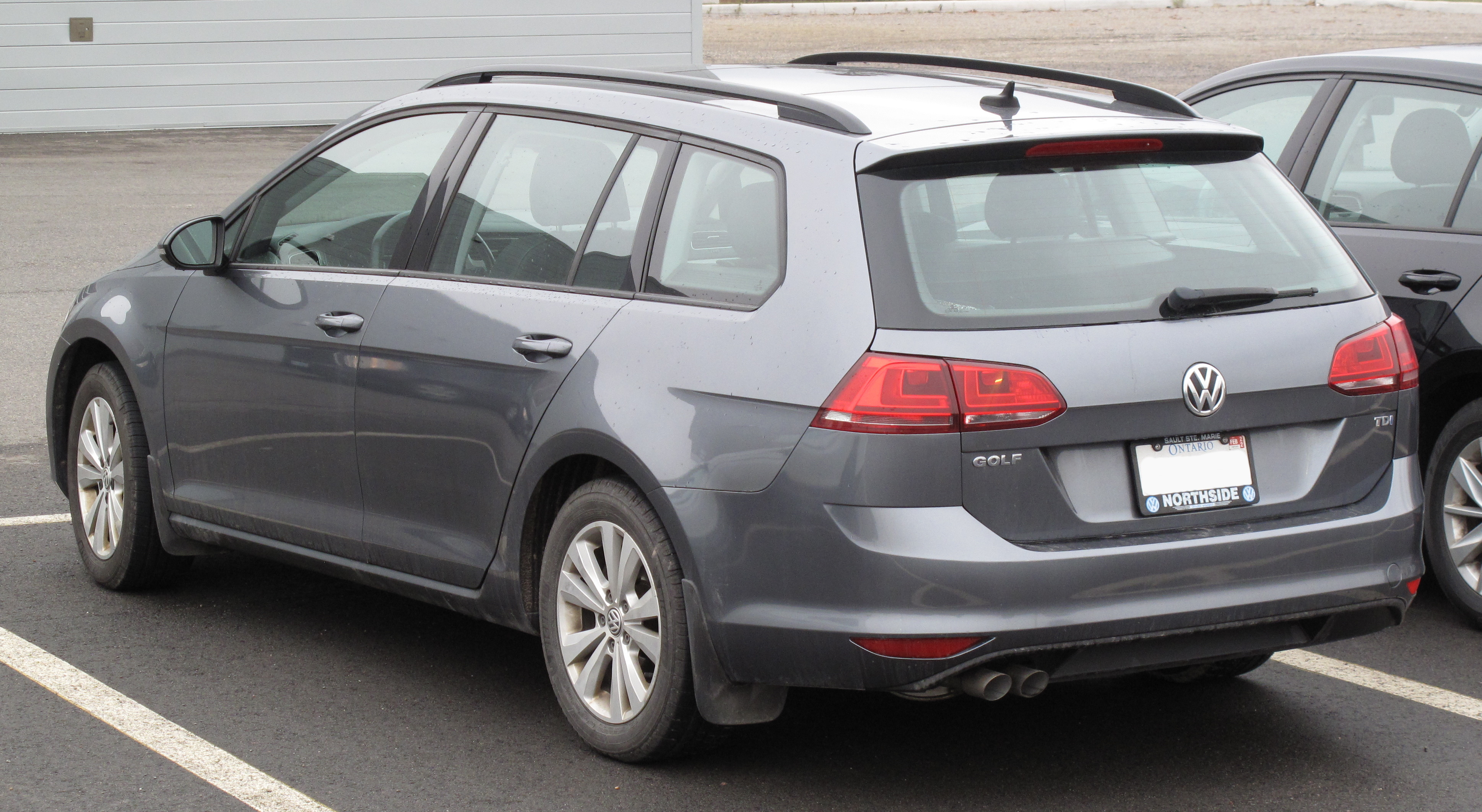
Rear view

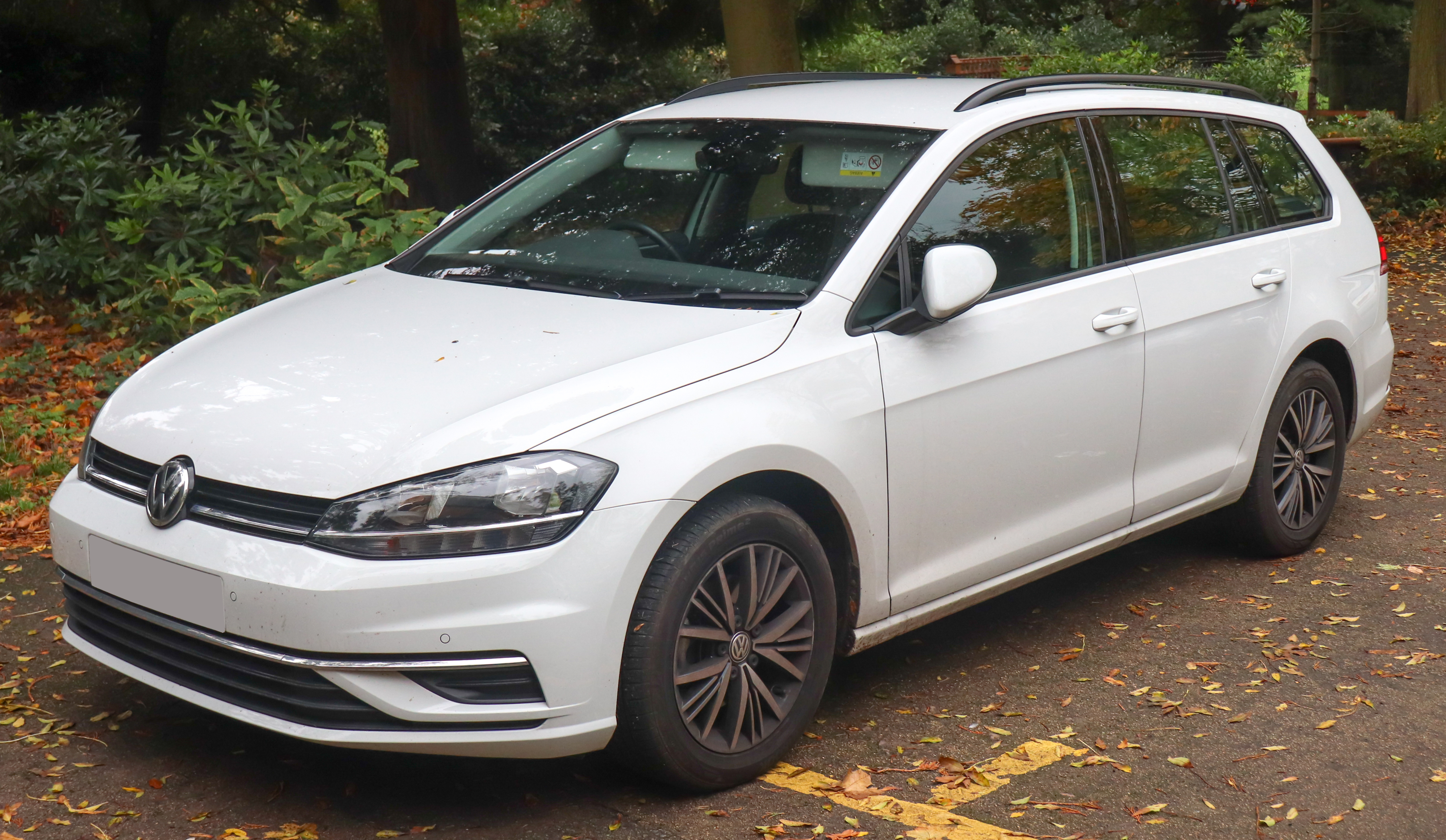
Golf Variant (facelift)

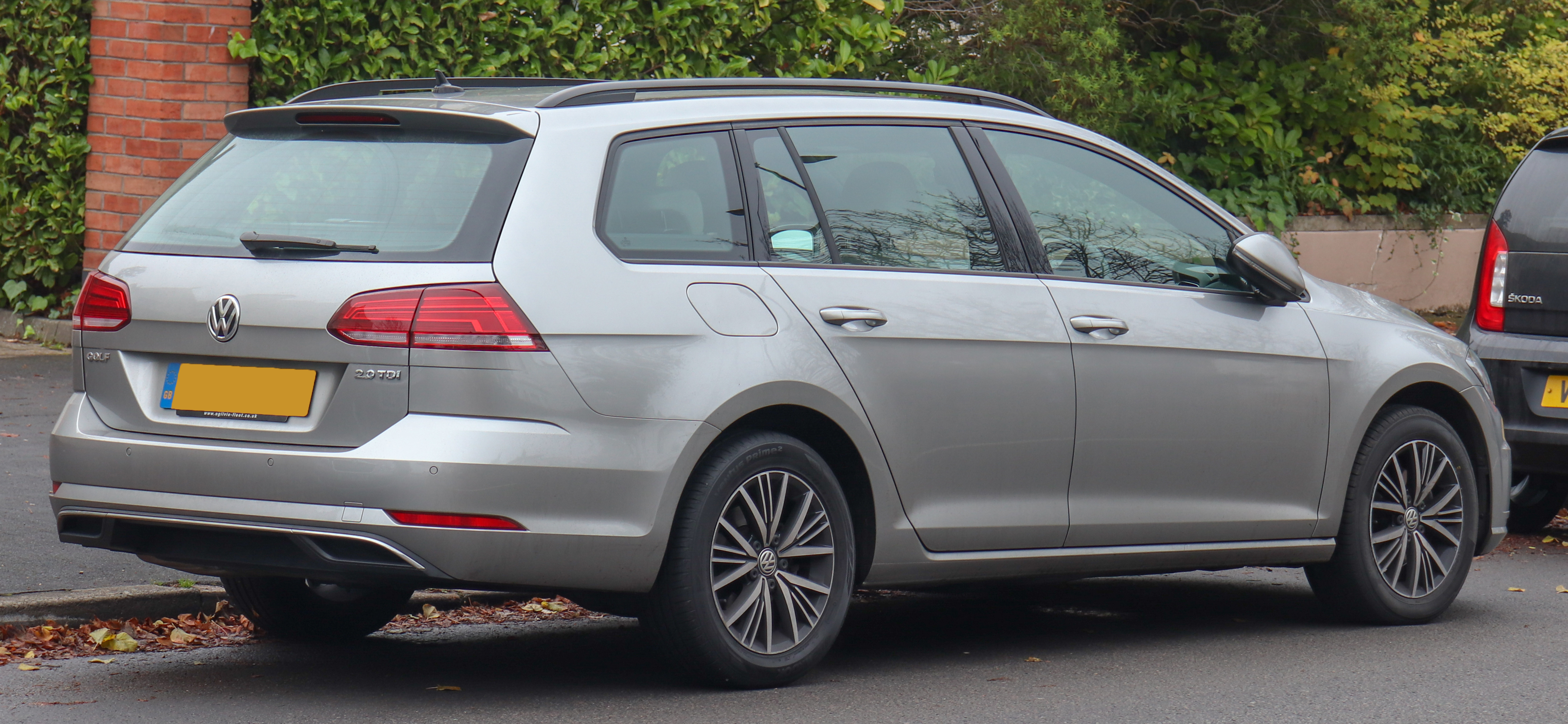
rear view

== e-Golf ==
The production version of the 2014 Volkswagen e-Golf was unveiled at the 2013 Frankfurt Motor Show. On 14 February 2014, Volkswagen launched sales of the e-Golf in Germany. In Norway, the e-Golf became available for pre-order on 25 February 2014 for delivery in June 2014. On 11 March 2014, Volkswagen opened ordering for the e-Golf in the UK with deliveries began at the end of June. Production of vehicles destined for retail customers began in March 2014. U.S. sales started in selected states in November 2014 with a single SEL Premium model for the 2015 model year. Volkswagen stopped sales of the e-Golf in the UK in 2021.

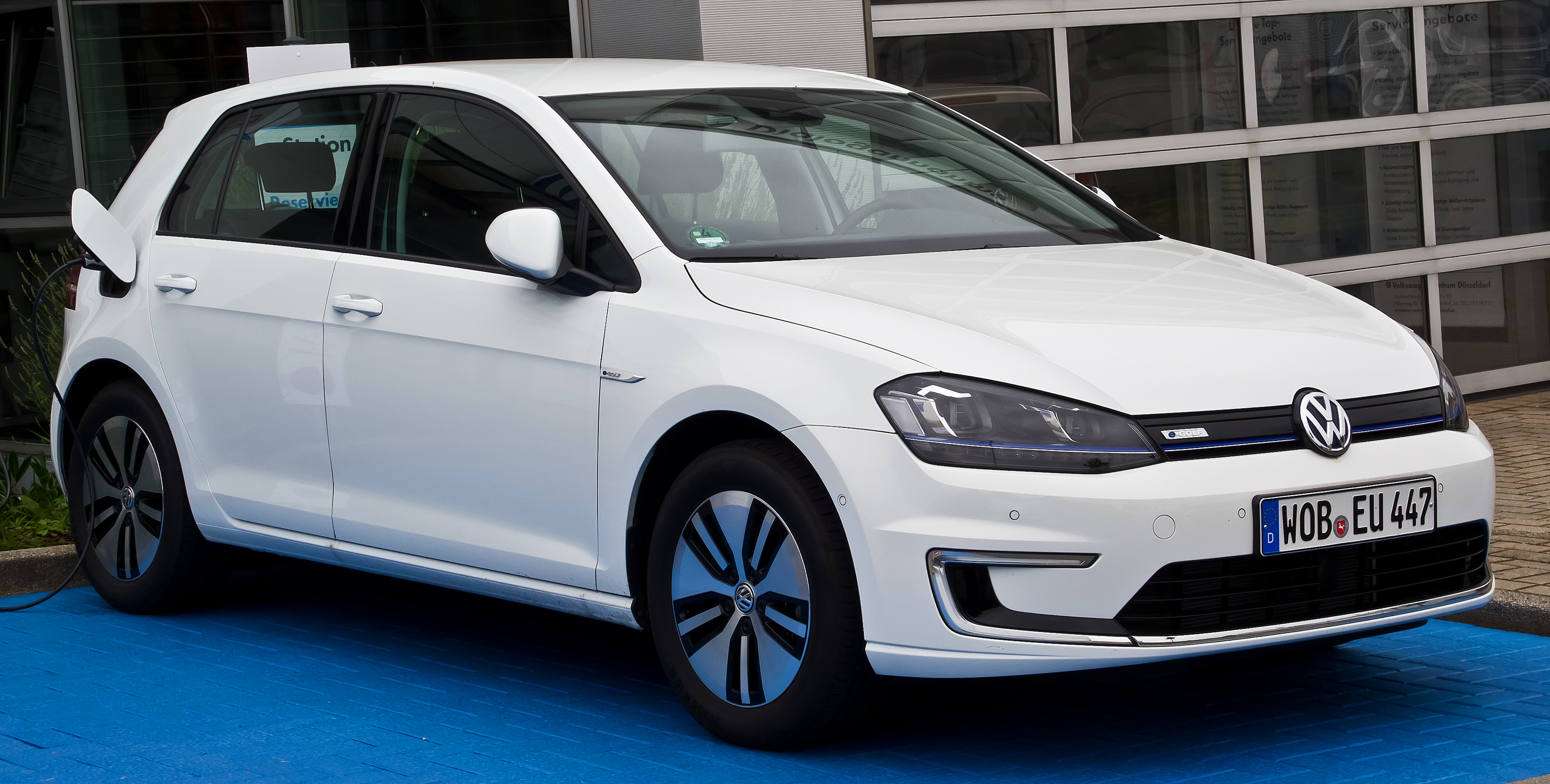
e-Golf (pre-facelift)

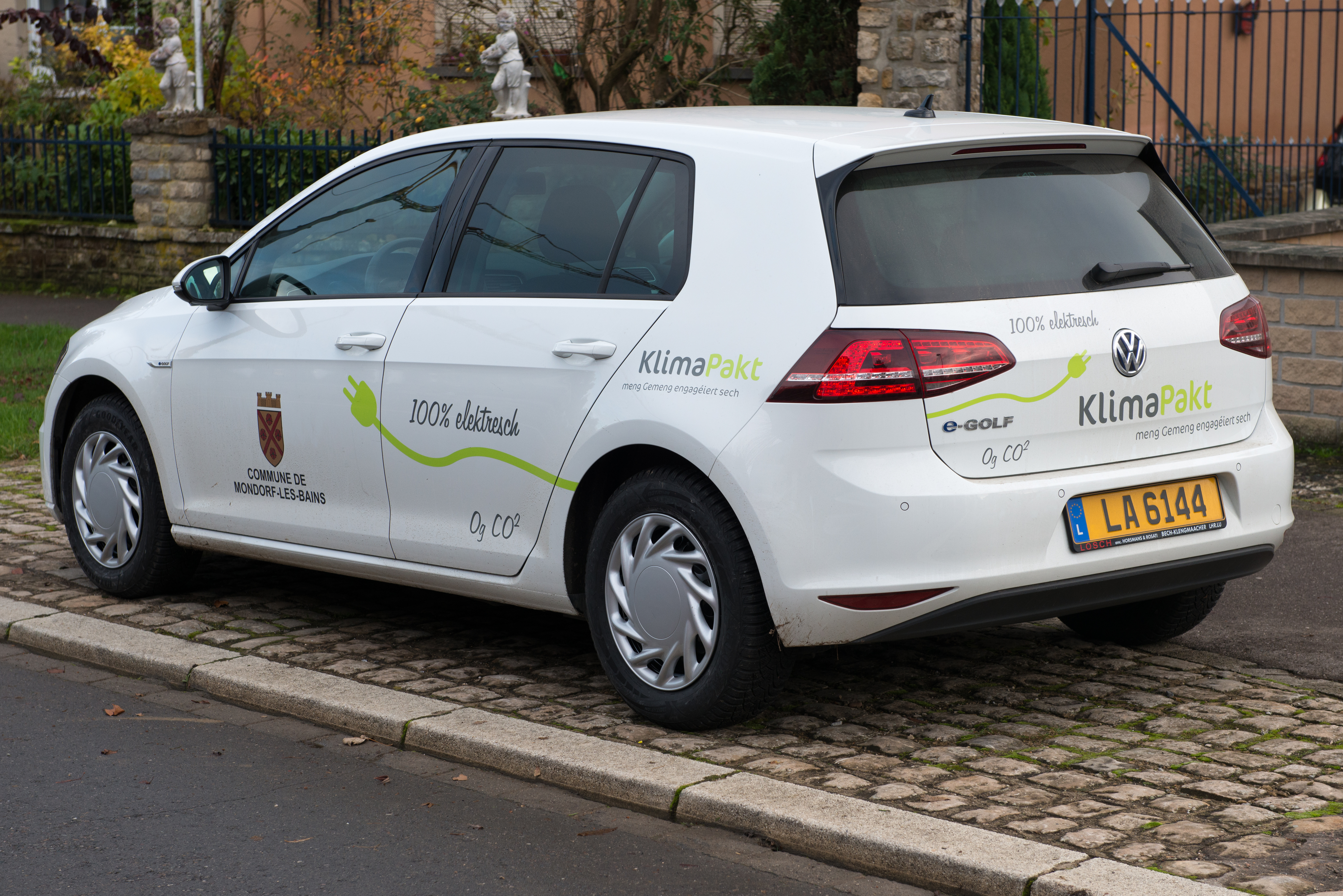
Rear view (facelift)

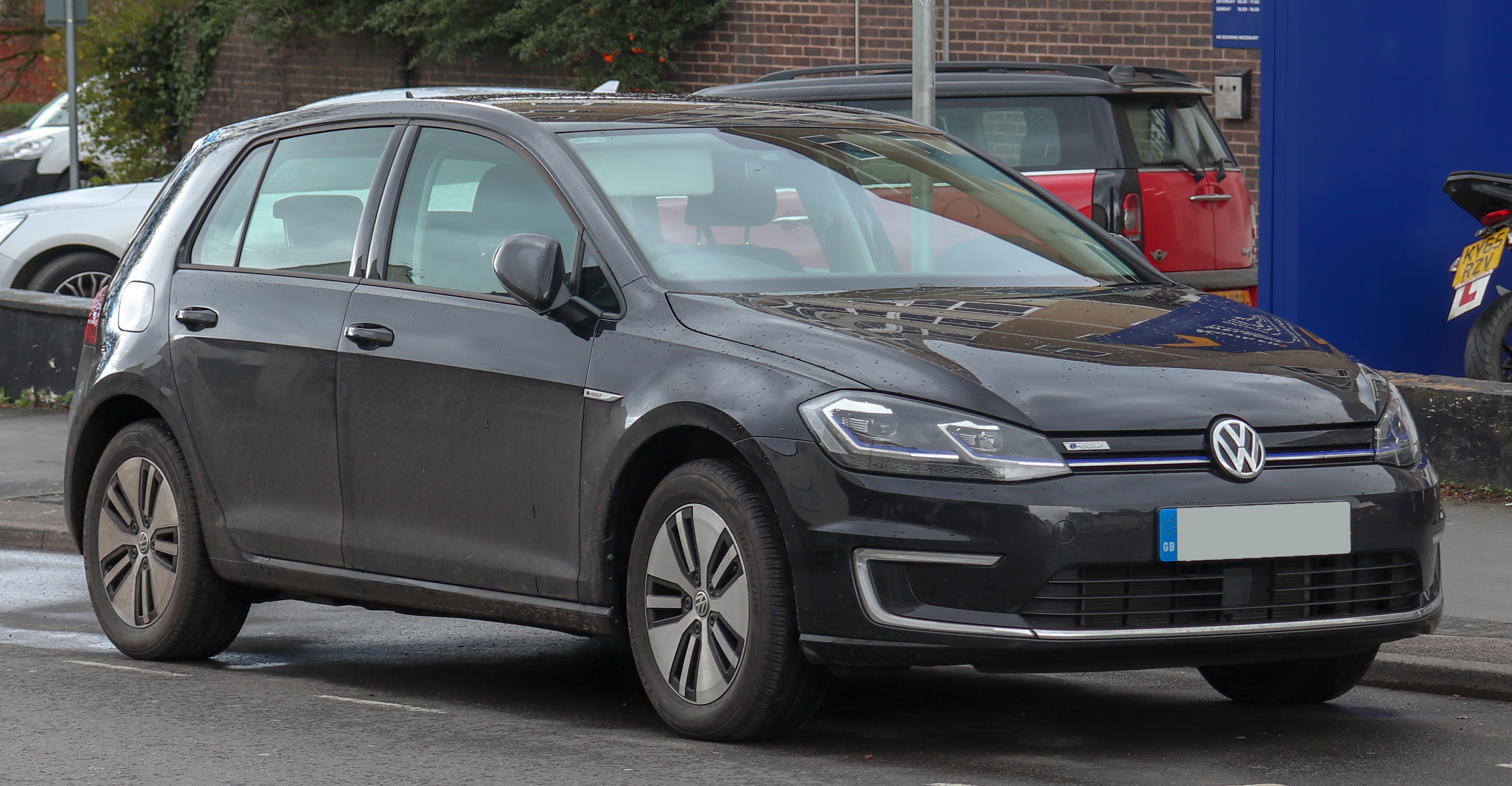
e-Golf (facelift)

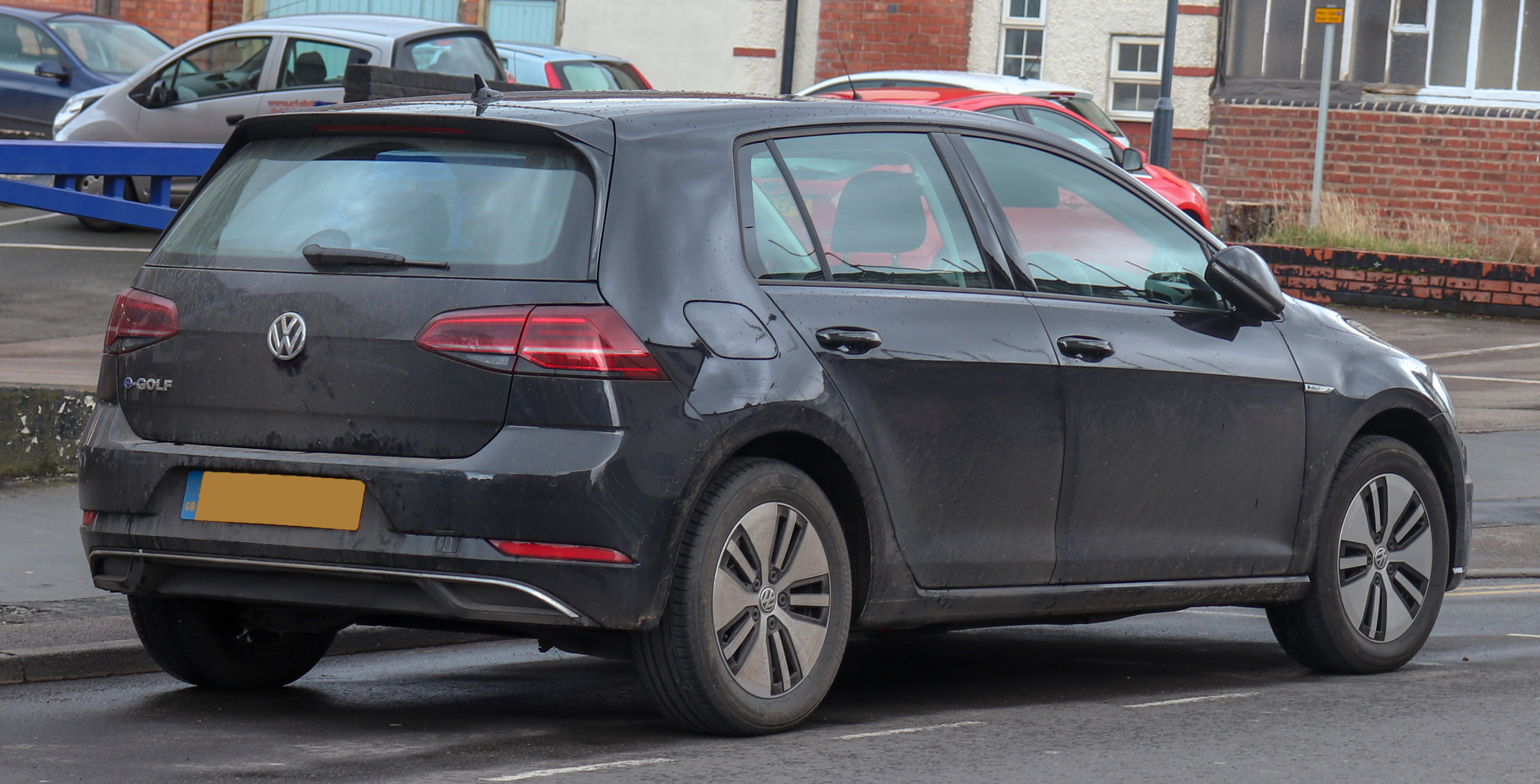
Rear view (facelift)

=== Drivetrain and specifications ===
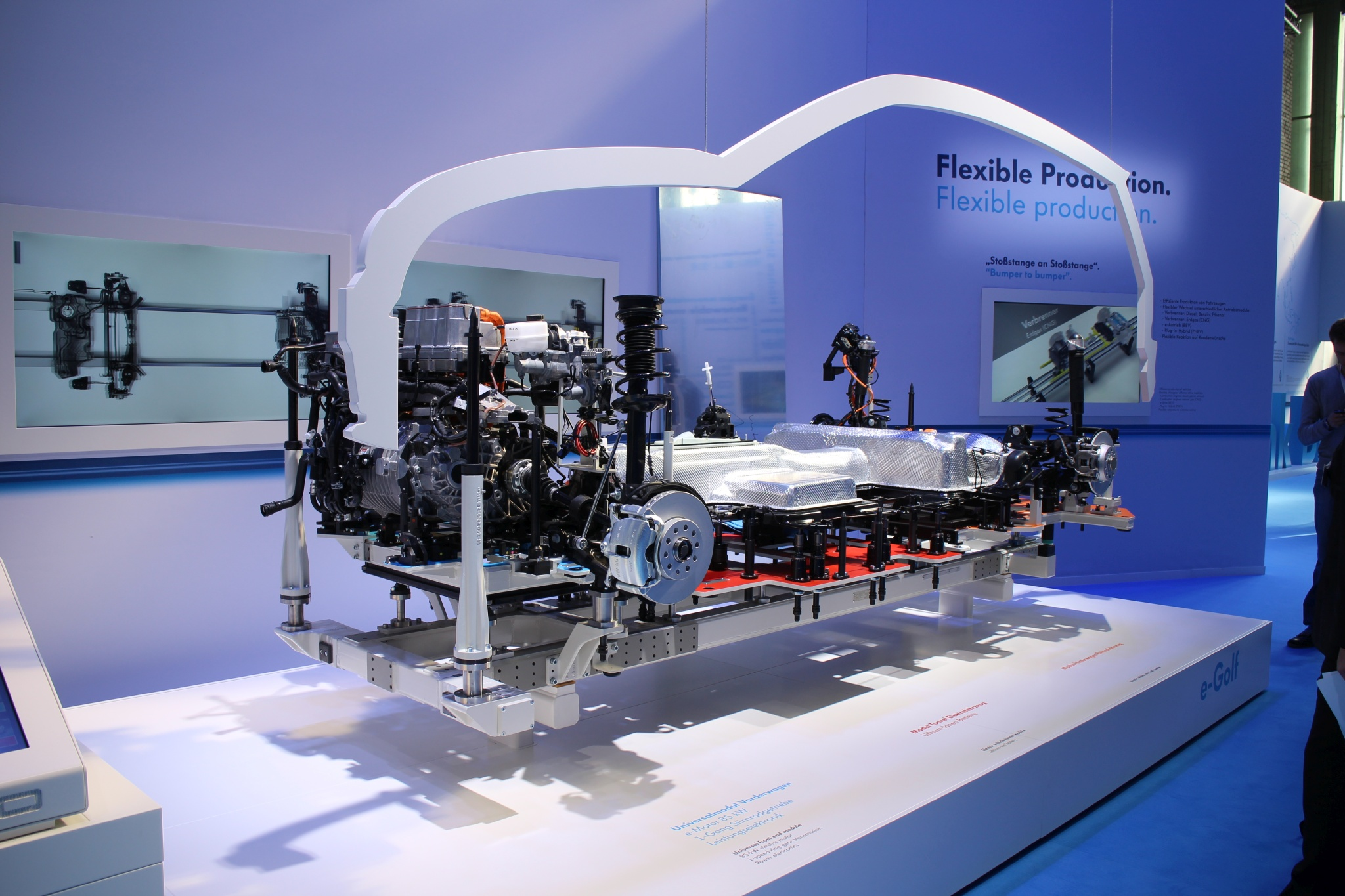
e-Golf chassis; traction battery is under the silver covers

According to VW, the e-Golf has a practical all-electric range of 130 to 190 km (81 to 118 mi), with an official NEDC cycle of 190 km (118 mi), reduced to 80 to 120 km (50 to 75 mi) in the winter. Under the EPA driving cycle used in the United States, the 2015 e-Golf has a range of 83 mi (134 km), and combined city/highway efficiency of 116 mpg‑e (29 kW⋅h/100 mi) (miles per gallon petrol equivalent). Real-world experience showed range varied between 58 and 110 mi (93 and 177 km), depending on the weather and use of climate control, with an average efficiency of 3.7 mi/kWh over 2,700 mi (4,300 km) of driving, mostly within the city. A heat pump was available as an option to reduce the power consumed by the heater in cold weather.

The high-voltage traction battery has a storage capacity of 24.2 kWh, composed of 264 individual cells arranged in 27 modules of 6 or 12 cells each. It has a nominal voltage of 323 V. Overall weight of the entire vehicle, including driver, was 1,510 kg (3,330 lb), of which 318 kg (701 lb) was the battery. In November 2013, VW announced the e-Golf with a liquid-cooled battery. However, the "liquid-cooled" description was removed from subsequent press releases in early 2014. Volkswagen dropped active thermal management for the battery pack because internal testing with Mk6 e-Golf prototypes showed high ambient temperatures did not affect battery performance. The smaller battery in the hybrid petrol-electric GTE does use active thermal management, but that model is positioned as a hybrid version of the sporty GTI, rather than the e-Golf's equivalence as an electric version of the regular Golf Mk7.

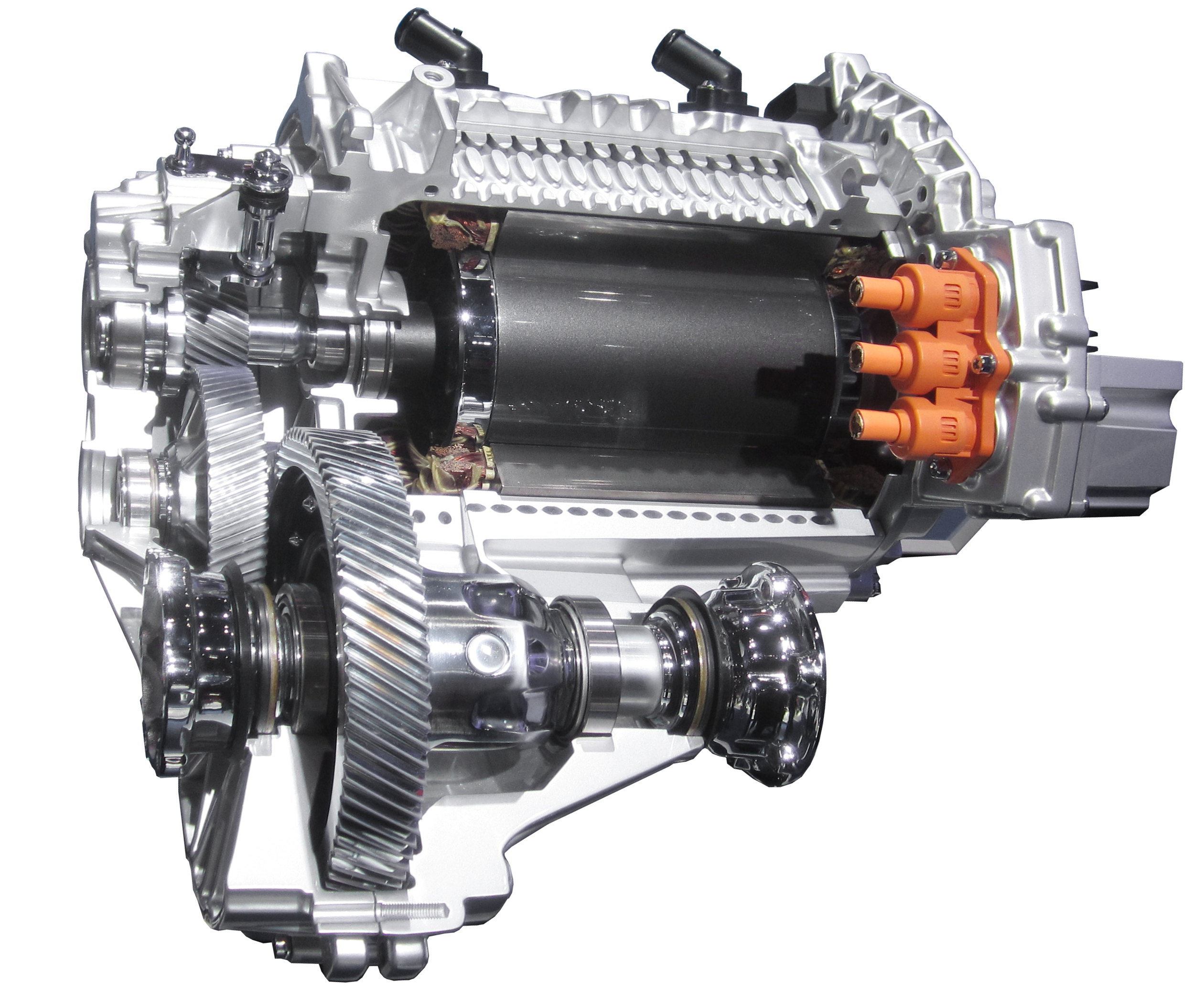
EEM 85 traction motor and integrated EQ 270 single-speed gearbox

The 2014–2016 model year e-Golf has a traction motor (designed EEM 85) and single-speed gearbox (EQ 270) with an output of 85 kW (114 hp) / 270 N⋅m (200 lbf⋅ft) in "Normal" mode; using "Eco" and "Eco+" mode reduces power / torque output to 70 kW (94 hp) / 220 N⋅m (162 lb⋅ft) and 54 kW (73 hp) / 175 N⋅m (129 lb⋅ft), respectively; Eco+ also disables the HVAC system. In addition, four different levels of regenerative braking can be selected. The standard on-board AC charger has a maximum input power rating of 3.6 kW; as an option, DC fast charging using a Combined Charging System (CCS) connector is available, accepting DC power at a maximum rate of 40 kW. The DC fast charging option also upgrades the on-board AC charger to 7.2 kW.

Top speed was electronically limited to 140 km/h (87 mph). Externally, the e-Golf can be distinguished from its fossil-fueled Mk7 counterparts by full LED headlamps and the deletion of the exhaust outlet.

=== Upgrades in 2017 ===
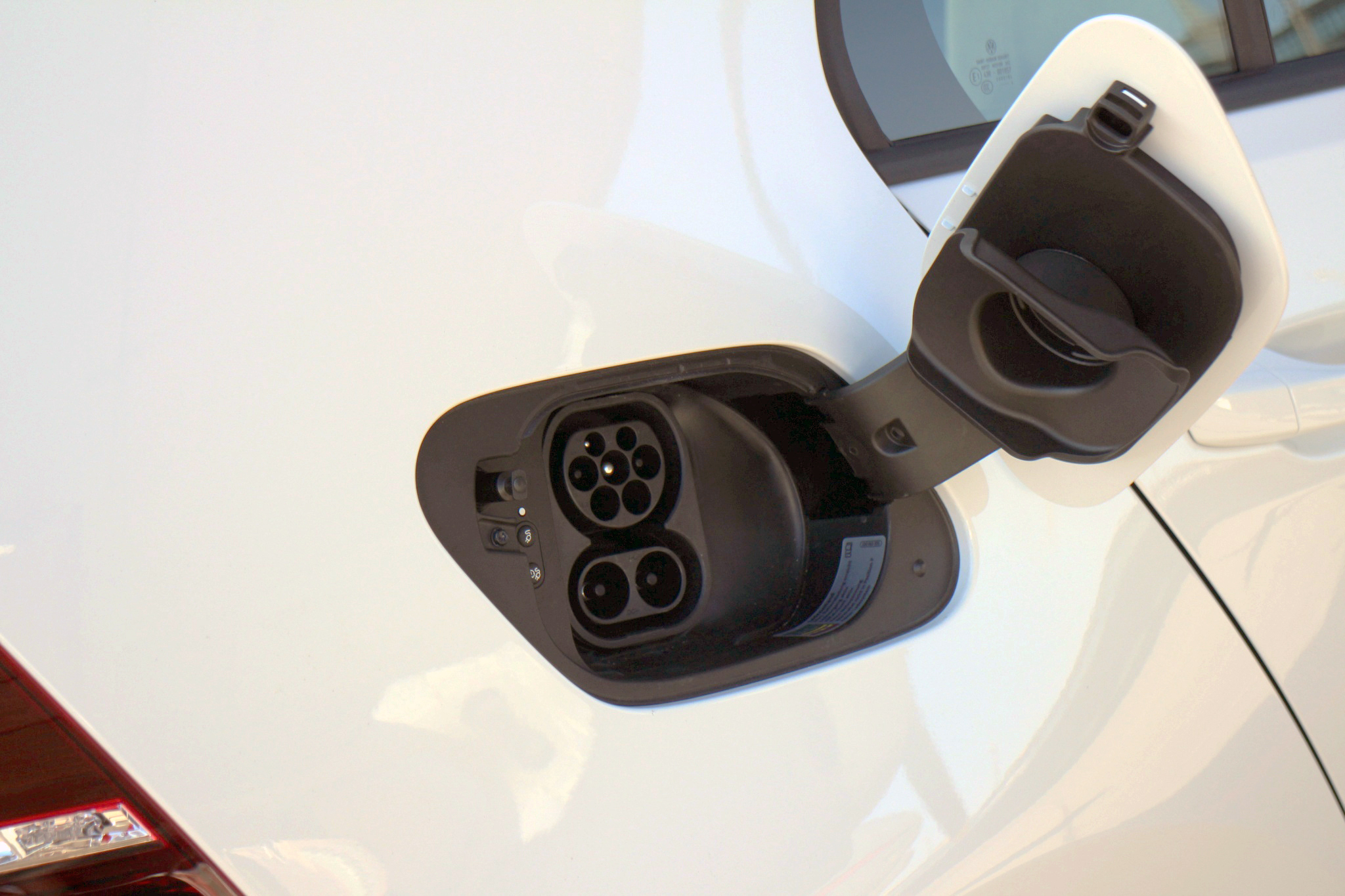
CCS (Type 2) vehicle inlet and open flap

The 2017 version (Mk7.5) has an improved battery pack with a greater storage capacity of 35.8 kWh, giving a range of 300 kilometres (190 mi) on the NEDC scale and an EPA rating of 125 miles (201 km). In addition, the onboard charger was upgraded and accepts AC power at up to 7.2 kW as standard; DC fast charging (with CCS connector) was optional on the SE trim, and made standard for the SEL Premium and Limited Edition trims. Traction motor output also increased, to 130 hp (100 kW) and 210 lbf⋅ft (290 N⋅m), reducing acceleration time from 0 to 100 km/h (62 mph) to 9.6 seconds. Real-world testing indicated a full charge would provide a range of 110–120 mi (180–190 km). For the 2020 model year, due to a change in the EPA testing procedure, the e-Golf was re-rated to a 123 mi (198 km) range and the combined efficiency rating dropped from 119 to 113 mpg‑e (28 to 30 kW⋅h/100 mi).

The e-Golf was the last hatchback version of the Golf Mk7 produced in Europe, with production continuing until late December 2020 due to high demand, well after other powertrain variants which were discontinued in 2019. The successor ID.3 had been launched in 2019 and took over the e-Golf's Transparent Factory production line in Dresden, starting at the end of January 2021. In the United States, the production allotment of 2020 model year e-Golfs was diverted to Canada.

In China, domestic e-Golf production by the FAW-Volkswagen joint venture supplanted vehicles imported from Wolfsburg, starting in 2019. This helped VW meet the electric vehicle quota imposed by China: starting in 2019, manufacturers that sell more than 30,000 vehicles per year must ensure that ten percent of those are electric. Chinese production of the e-Golf by FAW-VW at the Foshan plant continued into 2021 with two models, the Golf·Pure Electric Motor and Golf·Pure Electric Motor Pro; the Foshan plant, which produced MQB platform vehicles from its opening in 2014, was retooled to add a MEB vehicle production line and the first ID.4 CROZZ vehicles began production at Foshan in late November 2020.

==== Spektrum Program ====
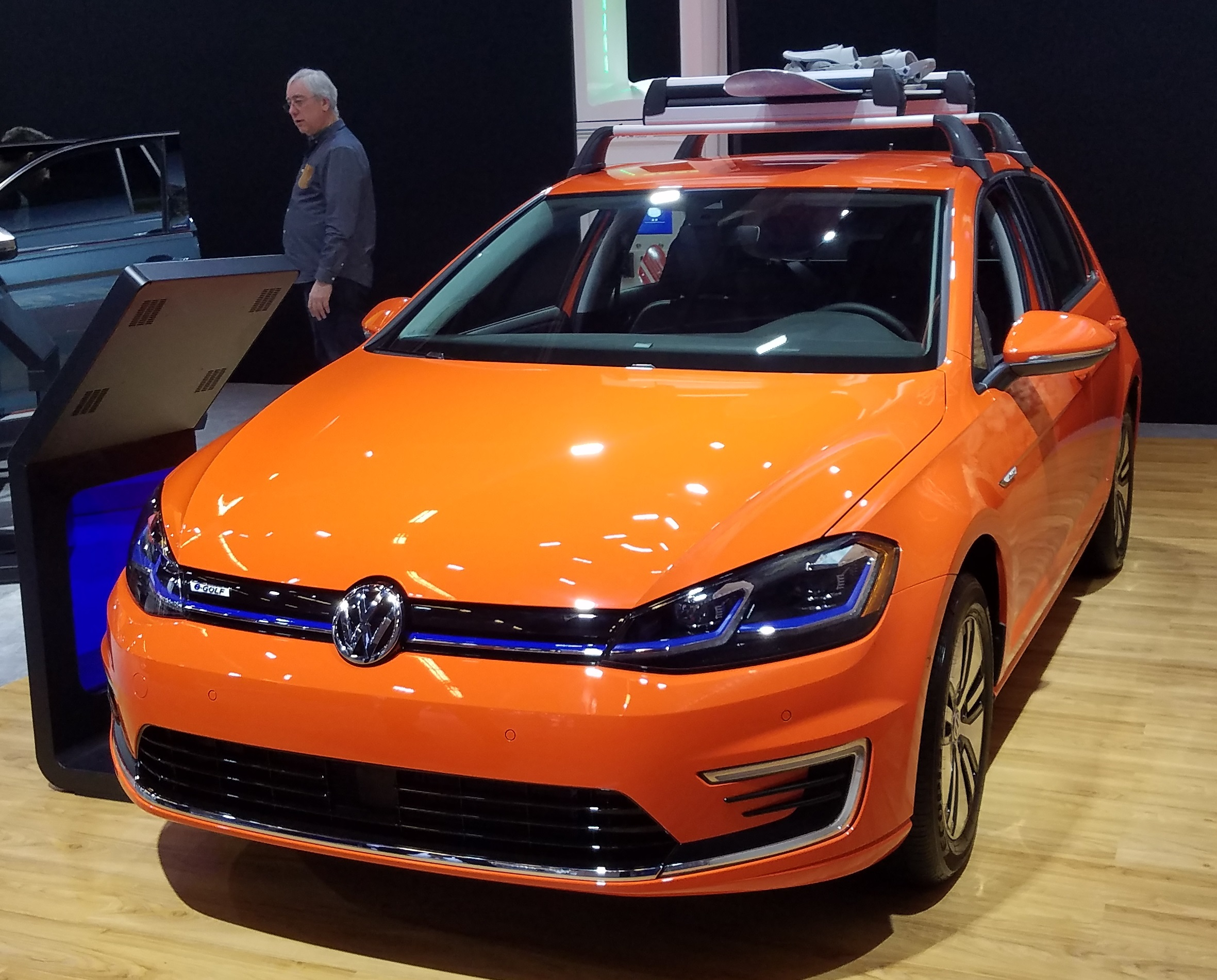
Volkswagen e-Golf in Spektrum TNT Orange

From the 2017 to 2020 model years, Canadian-market e-Golfs could be optioned with one of 40 custom-order paint colours offered as part of Volkswagen's Spektrum program at a cost of roughly $3,000 CAD. A total of 104 e-Golfs were ordered with a Spektrum-program colour.

== Golf GTE ==
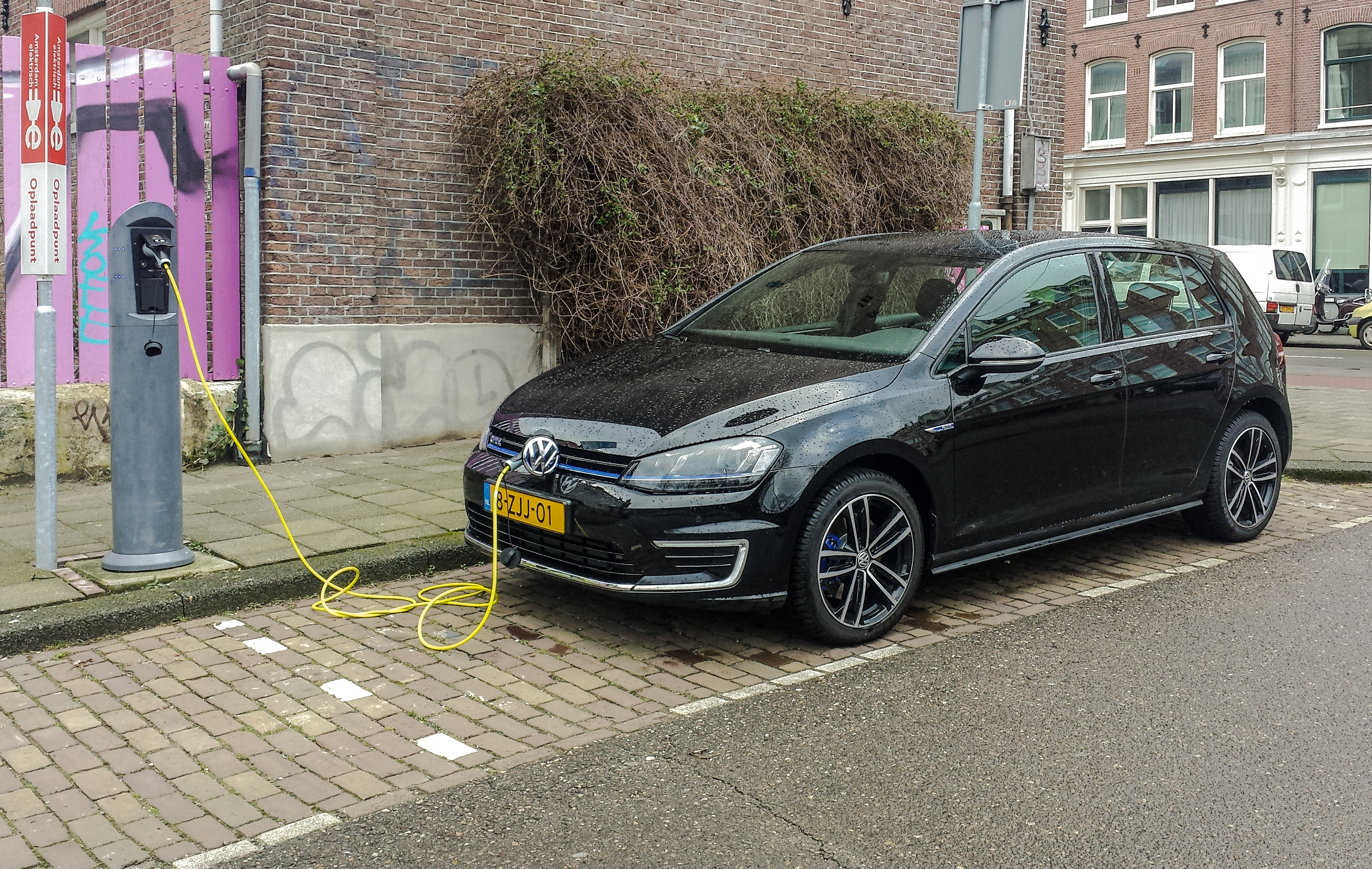
Golf GTE (pre-facelift)

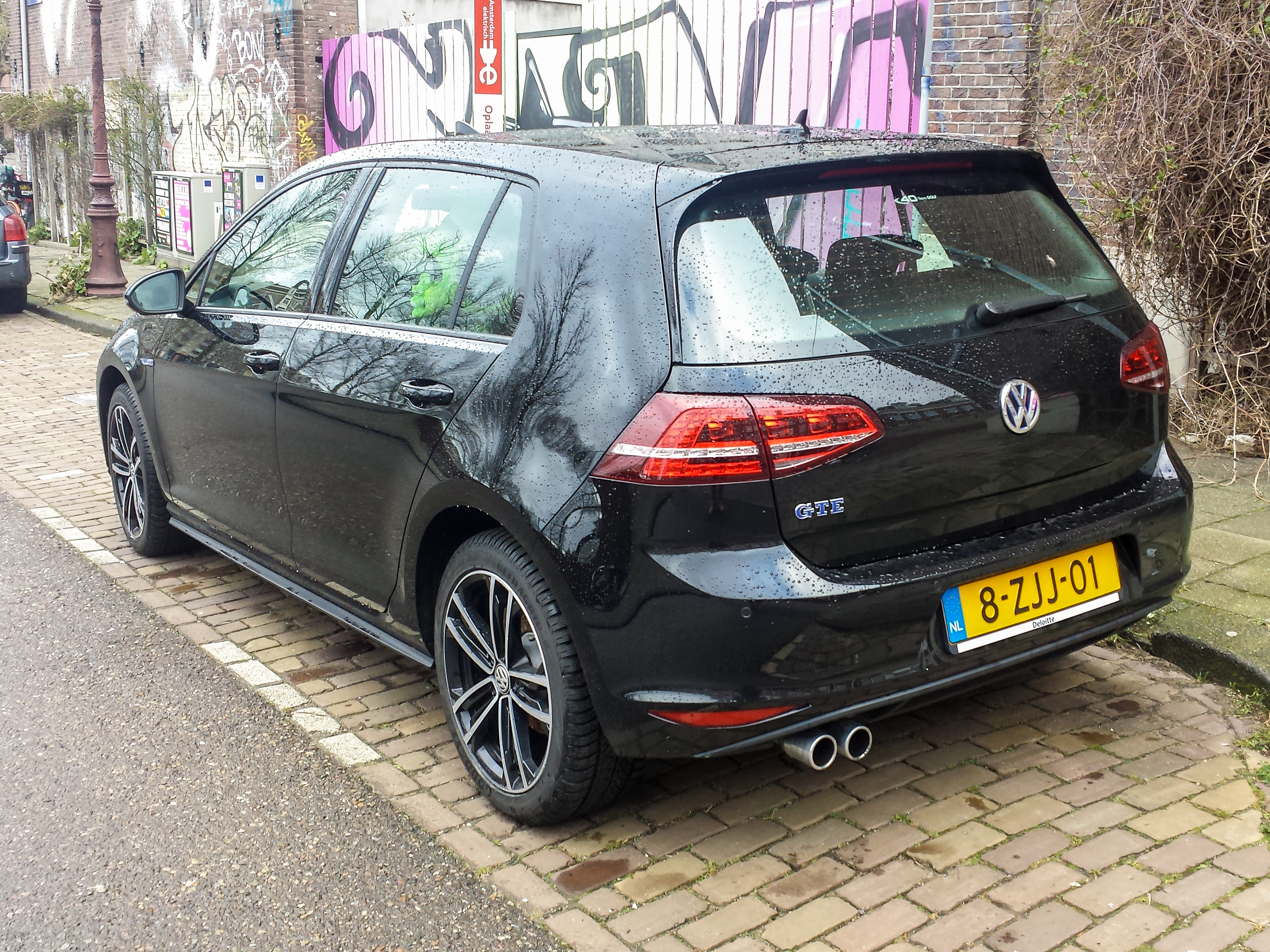
Golf GTE (pre-facelift)

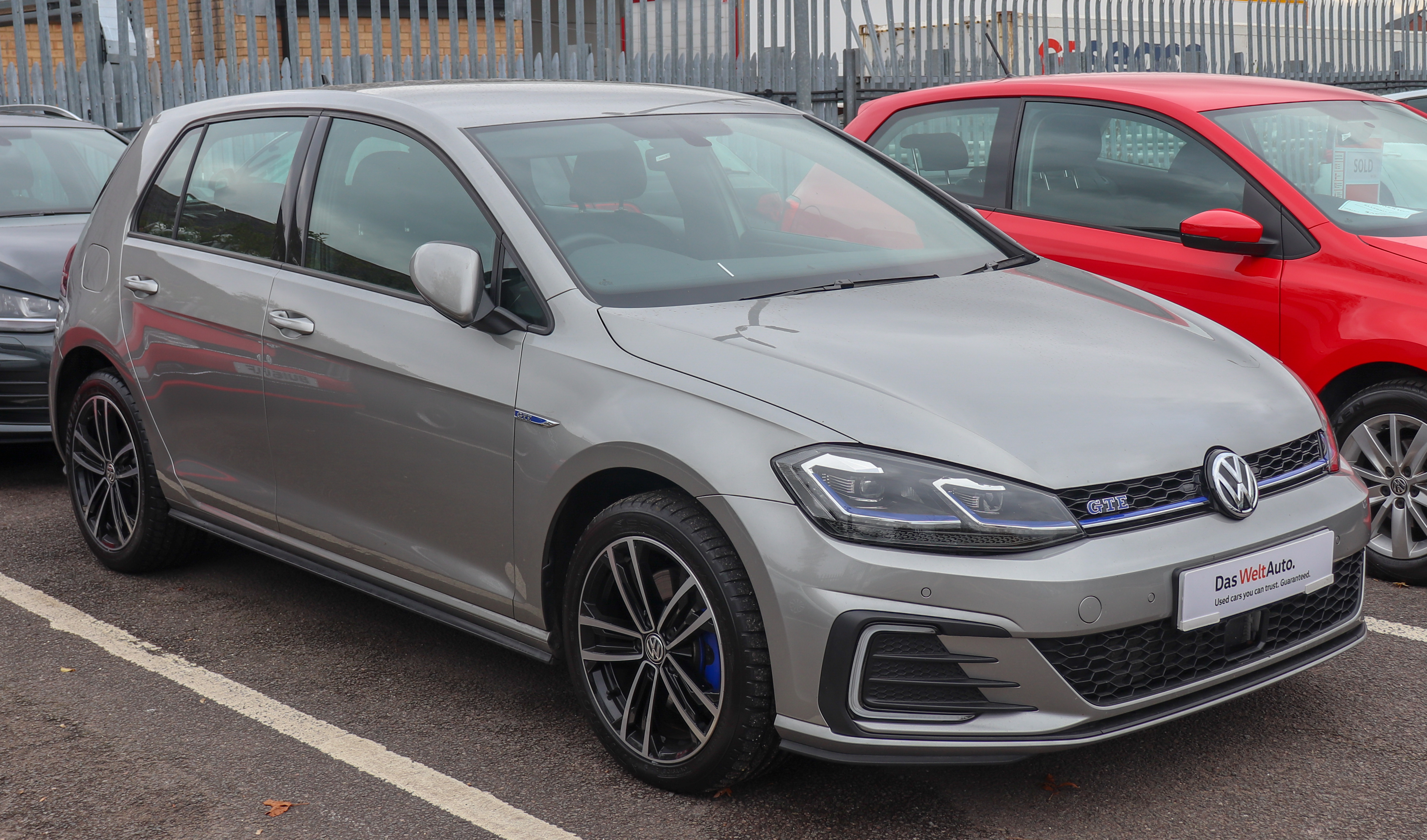
Golf GTE (facelift)

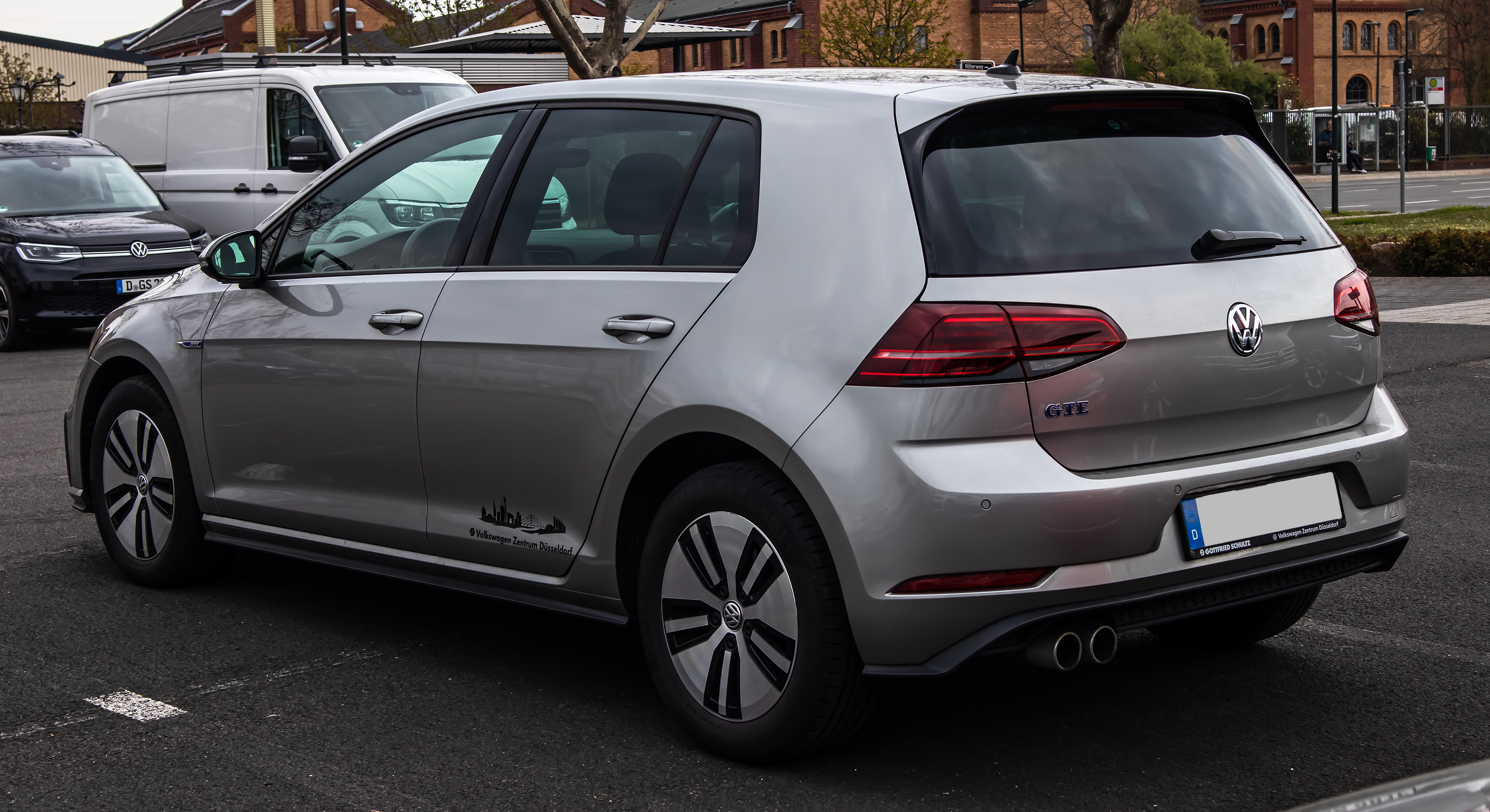
Golf GTE (facelift)

The Golf GTE plug-in hybrid is driven by two power sources: a 1.4-litre 110 kW (150 PS; 148 hp) TSI direct-injection petrol engine and a 75 kW (101 hp) electric motor. Together, they combine to produce power of 150 kW (204 PS; 201 hp) and 350 N⋅m (258 lb⋅ft) of torque, with a theoretical range of 827 km (514 mi). Using the electric motor alone, the GTE is capable of speeds of 130 km/h (81 mph). With the TSI engine, the Golf GTE can accelerate from 0-100 km/h (62 mph) in 7.6 seconds and reach a top speed of 215 km/h (134 mph). The Golf GTE shares the basic powertrain hardware as the Audi A3 Sportback e-tron, but the software controls are different. The Golf GTE also shares the same plug-in hybrid powertrain with the Volkswagen Passat GTE, but the Passat has a larger 9.9 kWh Li-ion battery pack.

In EV mode, the Golf GTE has an official all-electric range of 50 km (31 mi) but in real world testing will often get around 35 km (22 mi) to 39 km (24 mi) miles of range. Under the New European Driving Cycle, combined fuel economy is 1.50 L/100 km (157 mpg_{‑US}) equivalent. The electric power can also be saved—for example when driving to a zero-emissions zone. The 8.8 kWh lithium-ion battery can be charged in around three and a half hours from a domestic mains outlet, or two and a half hours from a domestic wallbox. The battery weighs 120 kg (265 lb), giving the GTE a total kerb weight of 1,520 kg (3,351 lb).

The car has four (or on some older models, five) driving modes. The car will always start in all-electric mode (unless the battery has a very low charge). A button beside the gear stick allows the driver to select between Hybrid drive, which allows the car to switch between electric drive and the petrol motor when driving; Charge Mode, which uses energy from the petrol engine to recharge the car's battery; Battery hold mode, which solely uses the petrol engine to save battery power (only available on older models); and back to Electric mode. The final option, called GTE Mode, has a separate button beside the gear stick that lets the car use both the petrol engine and the electric motor for punchier performance.

The Golf GTE uses a six-speed DSG gearbox with a triple-clutch system specially developed for hybrid vehicles. The electric motor is integrated into the gearbox housing, while further hybrid components include power electronics and a charger. An electro-mechanical brake servo and an electric air-conditioning compressor enable energy-efficient braking and air conditioning.

Volkswagen claims a 0.299 drag coefficient.

Inside, as outside, the Golf GTE features blue highlights where the GTI has red. This includes stitching on the steering wheel, gear lever gaiter and seats, and a blue stripe in the tartan pattern on the sports seats. It includes bespoke functions for electric vehicles, including the ability to identify potential destinations on electric range and electric charging points. The GTE will also feature an e-manager that lets the driver preset vehicle charging as well as interior cooling or heating. These functions can also be operated remotely using the Volkswagen Car-Net app on a smartphone: a three-year subscription will be included in the UK.

The first GTE units were registered in Germany in August 2014, and it was the second-best selling plug-in hybrid in Europe in 2015 with 17,282 sales.

== Golf GTD ==
The Golf Mk7 GTD is powered by a 2.0-litre turbocharged common-rail diesel engine with 184 PS (135 kW; 181 hp). Maximum torque has risen from 350 N⋅m (258 lb⋅ft) to 380 N⋅m (280 lb⋅ft) from 1,750 rpm. The Golf R, in comparison, has 380 N⋅m (280 lb⋅ft) from 1,800 rpm. Acceleration from 0-100 km/h (62 mph) takes 7.5 seconds, while the top speed is 227 km/h (141 mph). The GTD has a combined fuel consumption of 4.18 L/100 km; 56.2 mpg_{‑US} (67.5 mpg_{‑imp}), making for CO_{2} emissions of only 109 g/km. With the optional six-speed dual-clutch gearbox (DSG), fuel consumption is 4.50 L/100 km; 52.3 mpg_{‑US} (62.8 mpg_{‑imp}) and CO_{2} emissions of 119 g/km. For comparison, when the first generation Golf BlueMotion went on sale at the end of 2007, it had the same fuel economy and CO_{2} emissions.

Pre-facelift

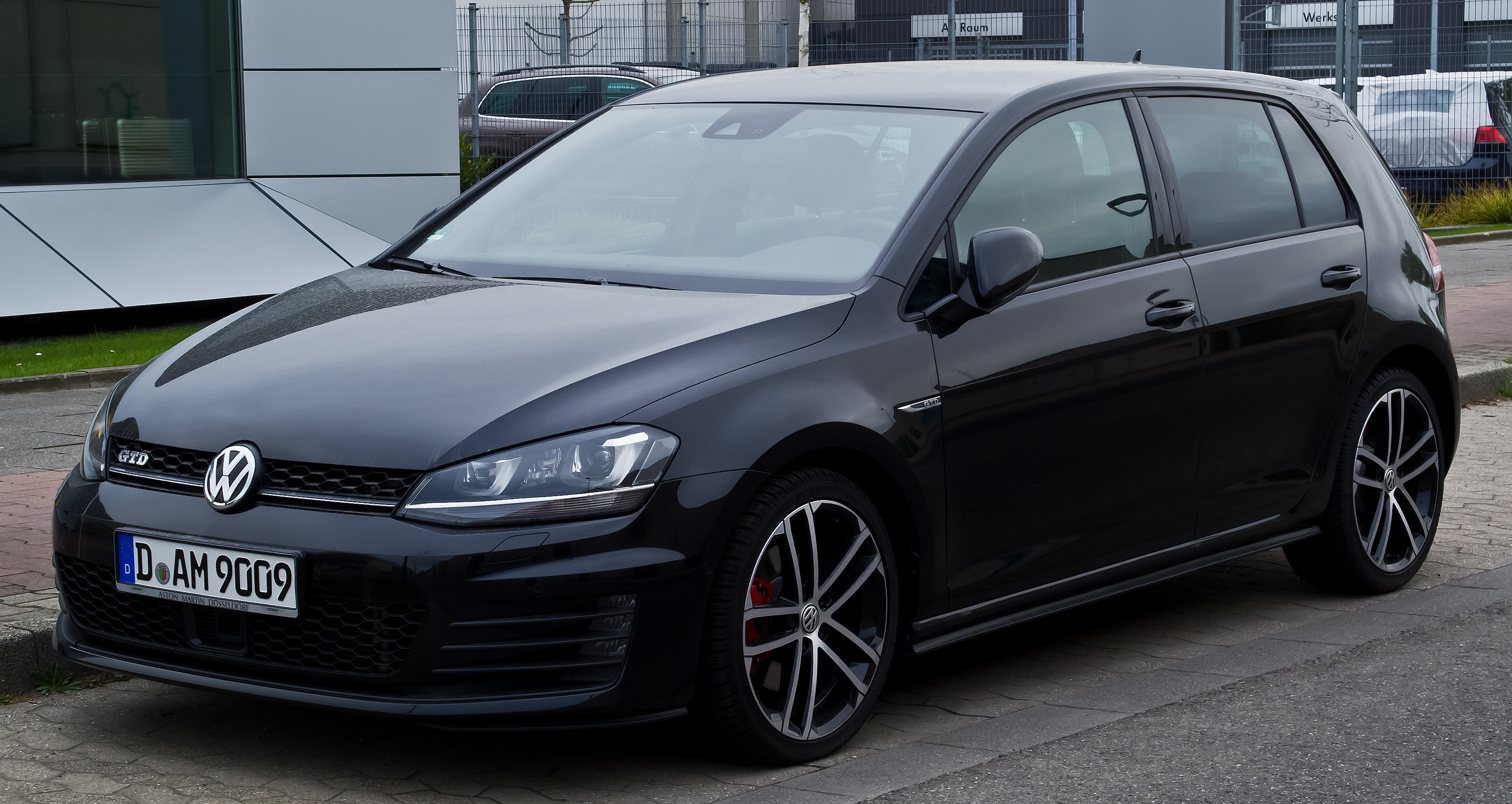
Hatchback (front)

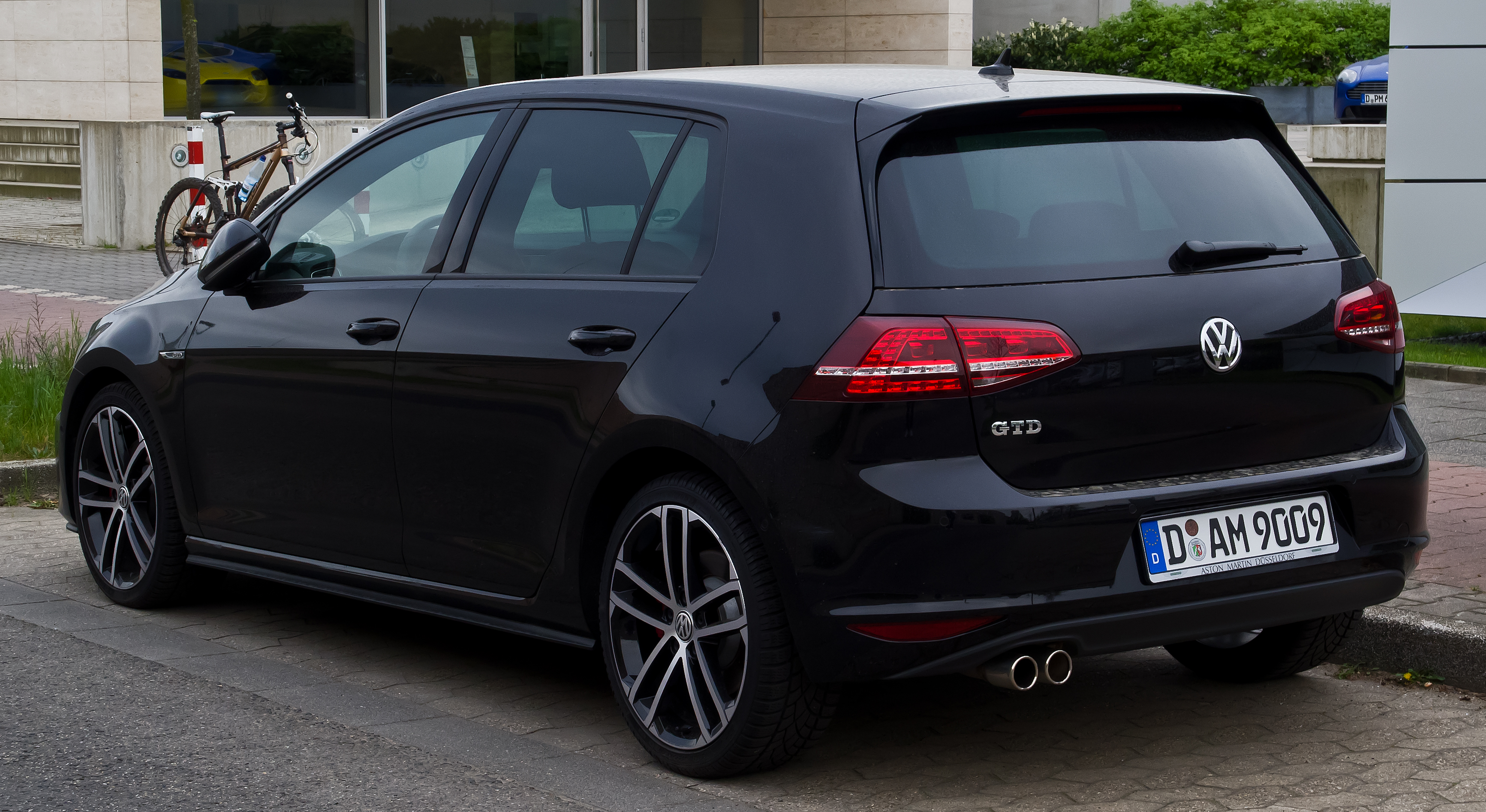
Hatchback (rear)

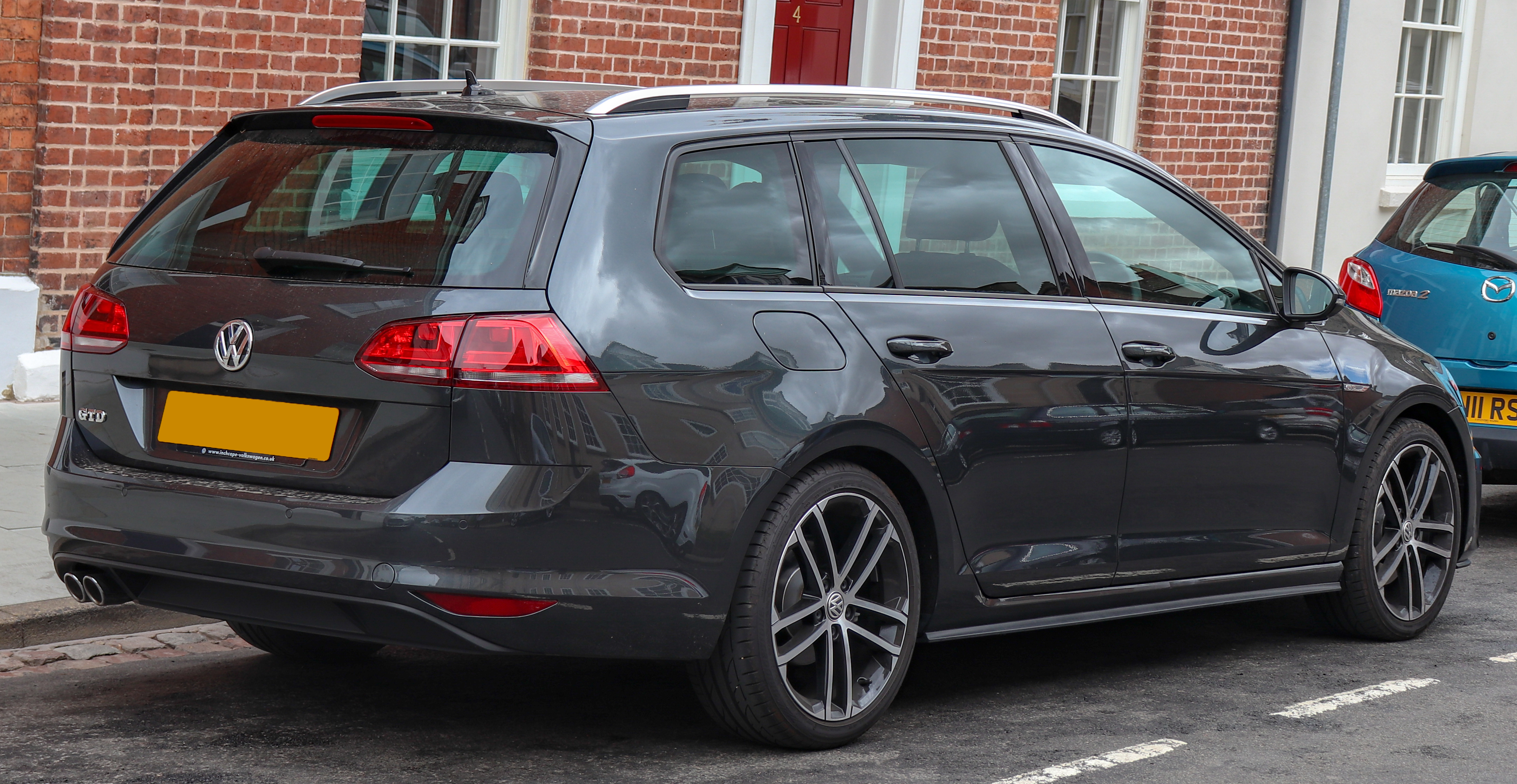
Variant

Post-facelift

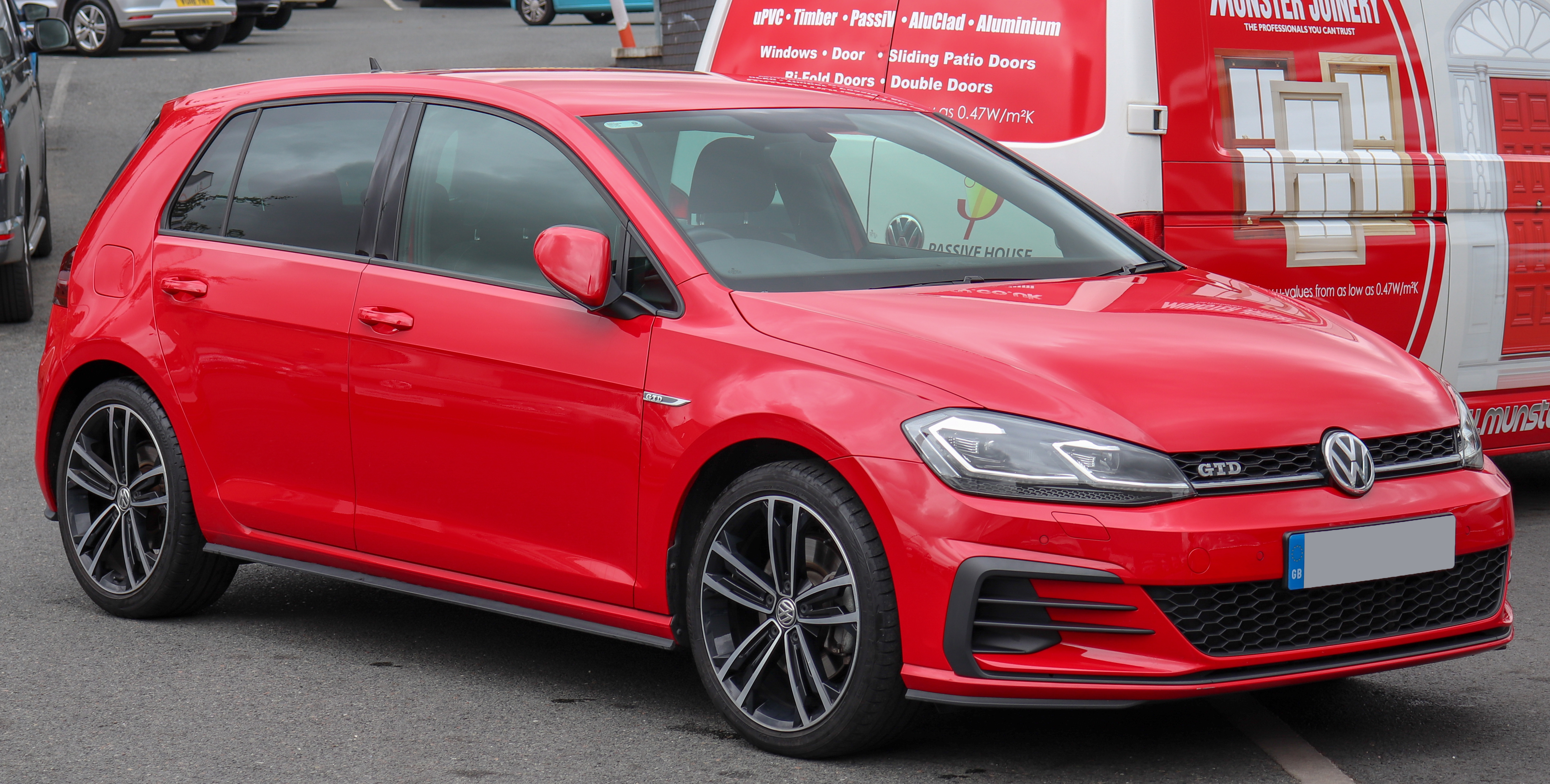
Hatchback (front)

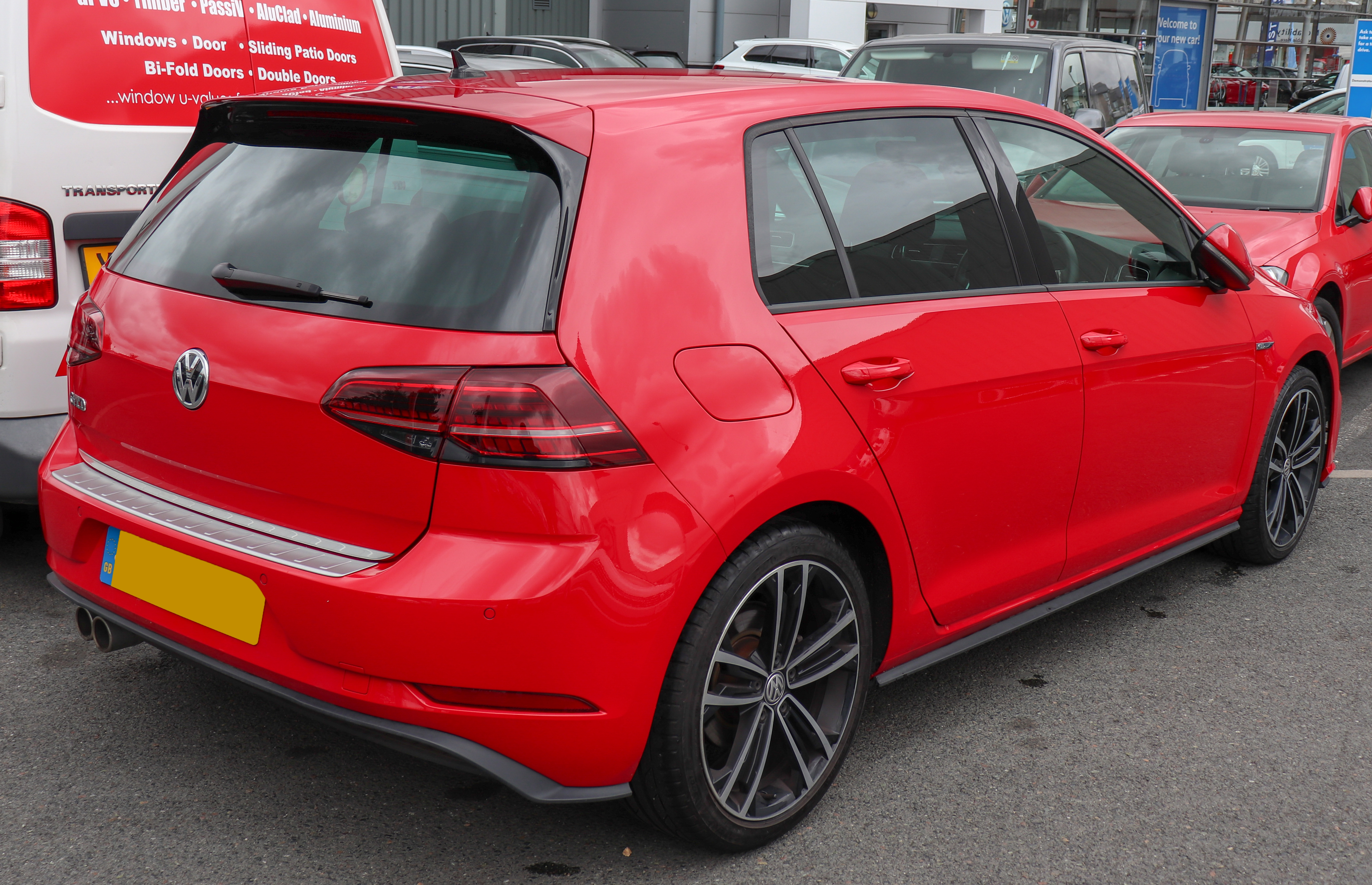
Hatchback (rear)

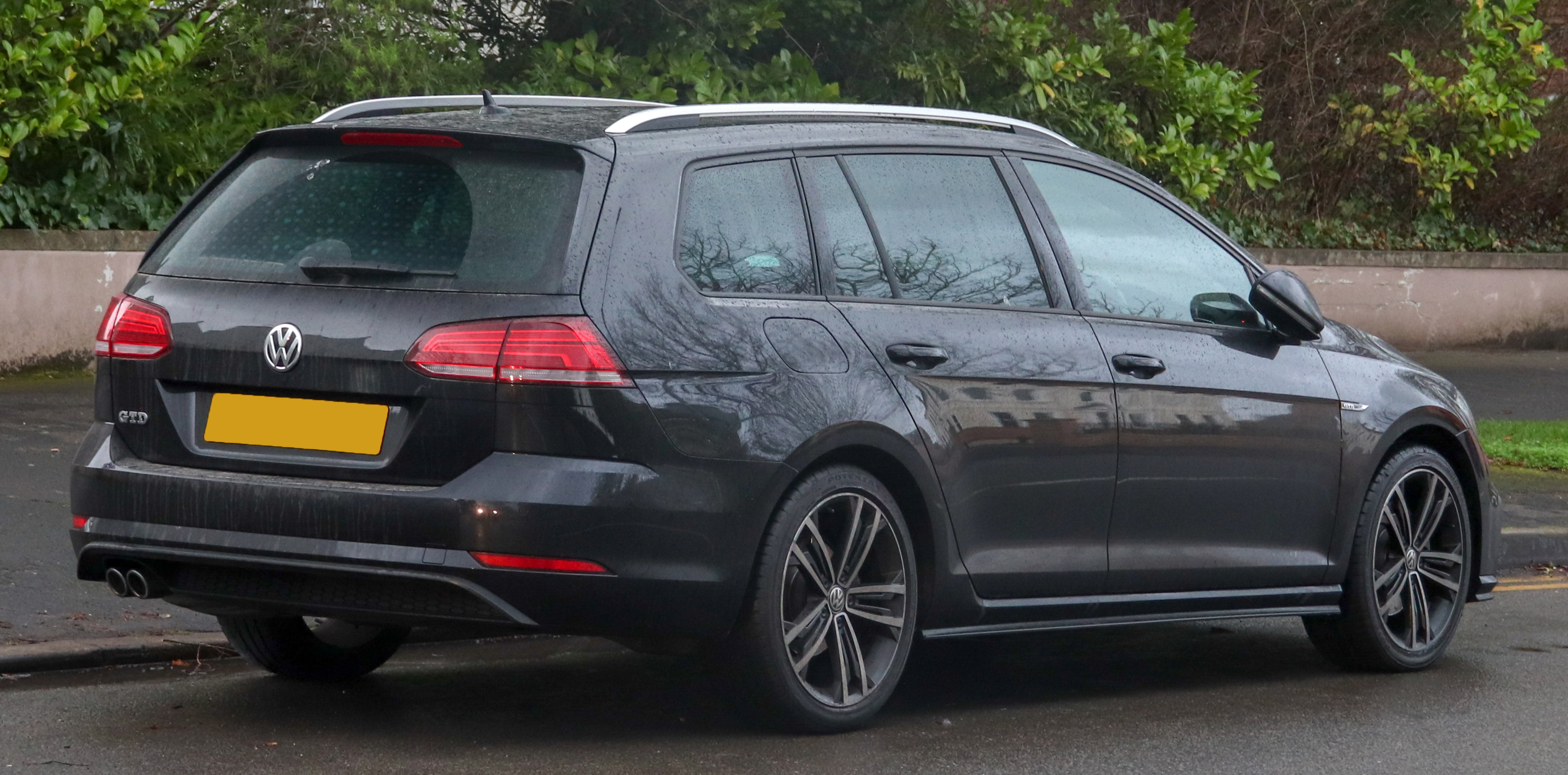
Variant

== Golf GTI ==
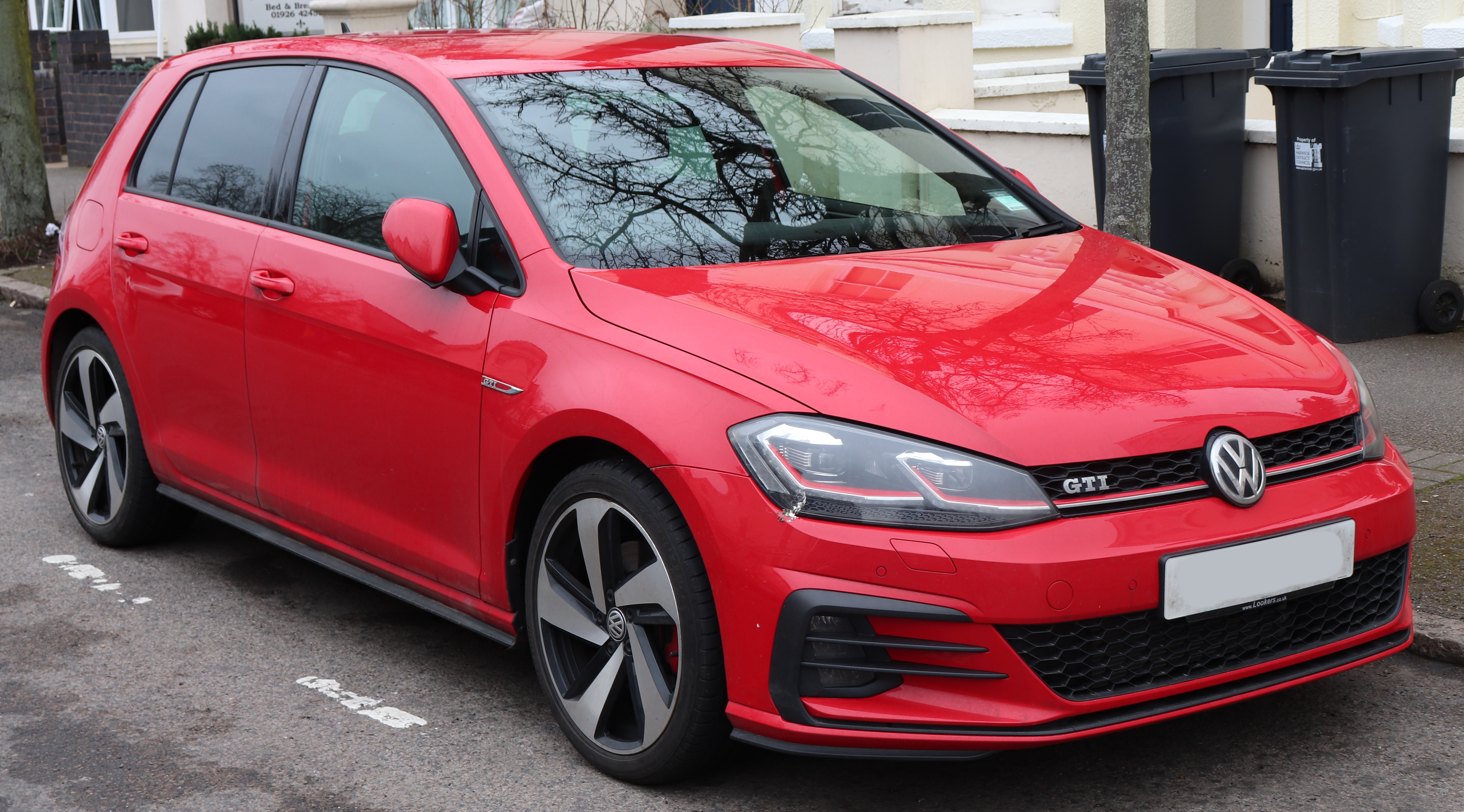

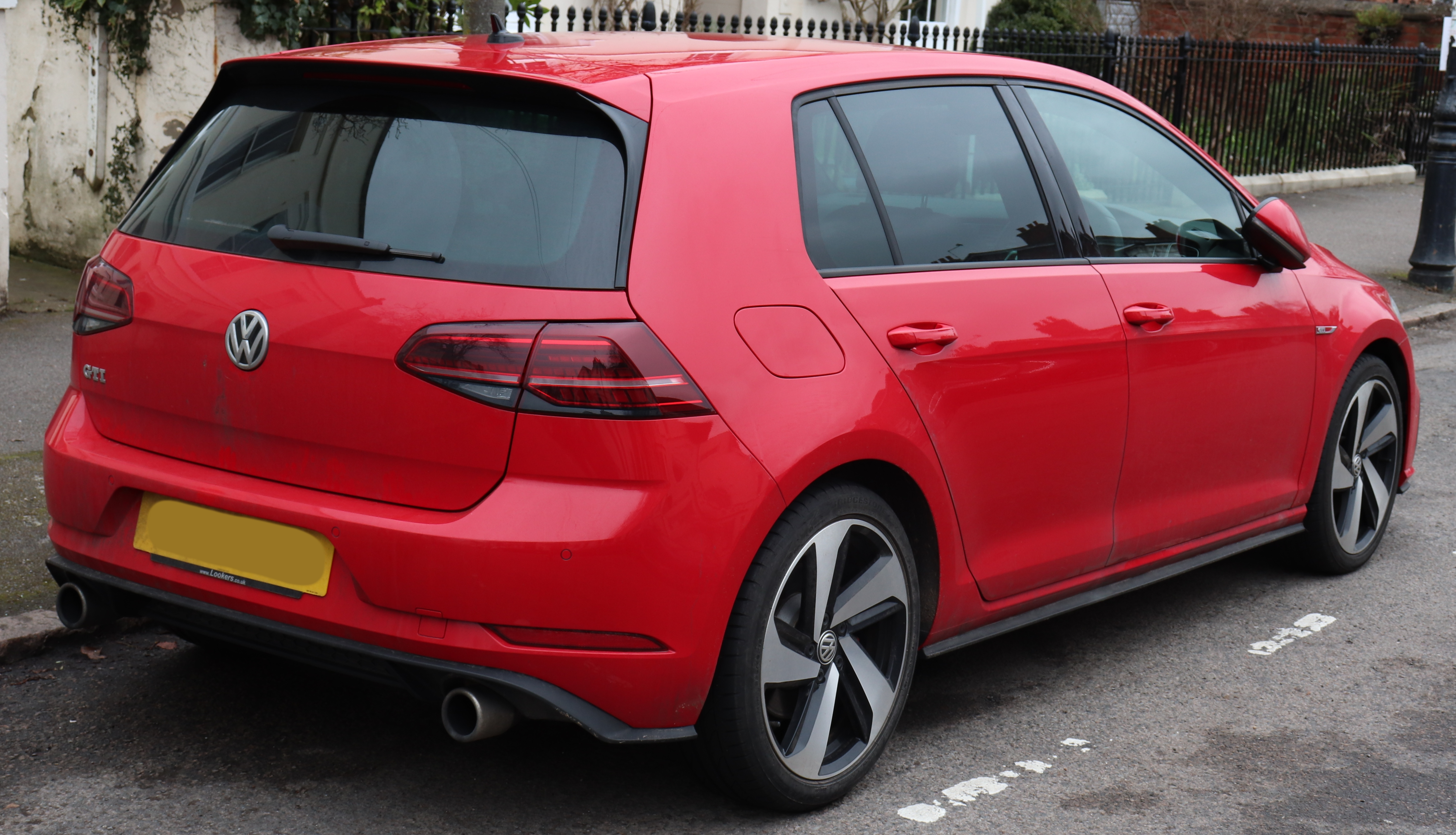
5-door hatchback (facelift)

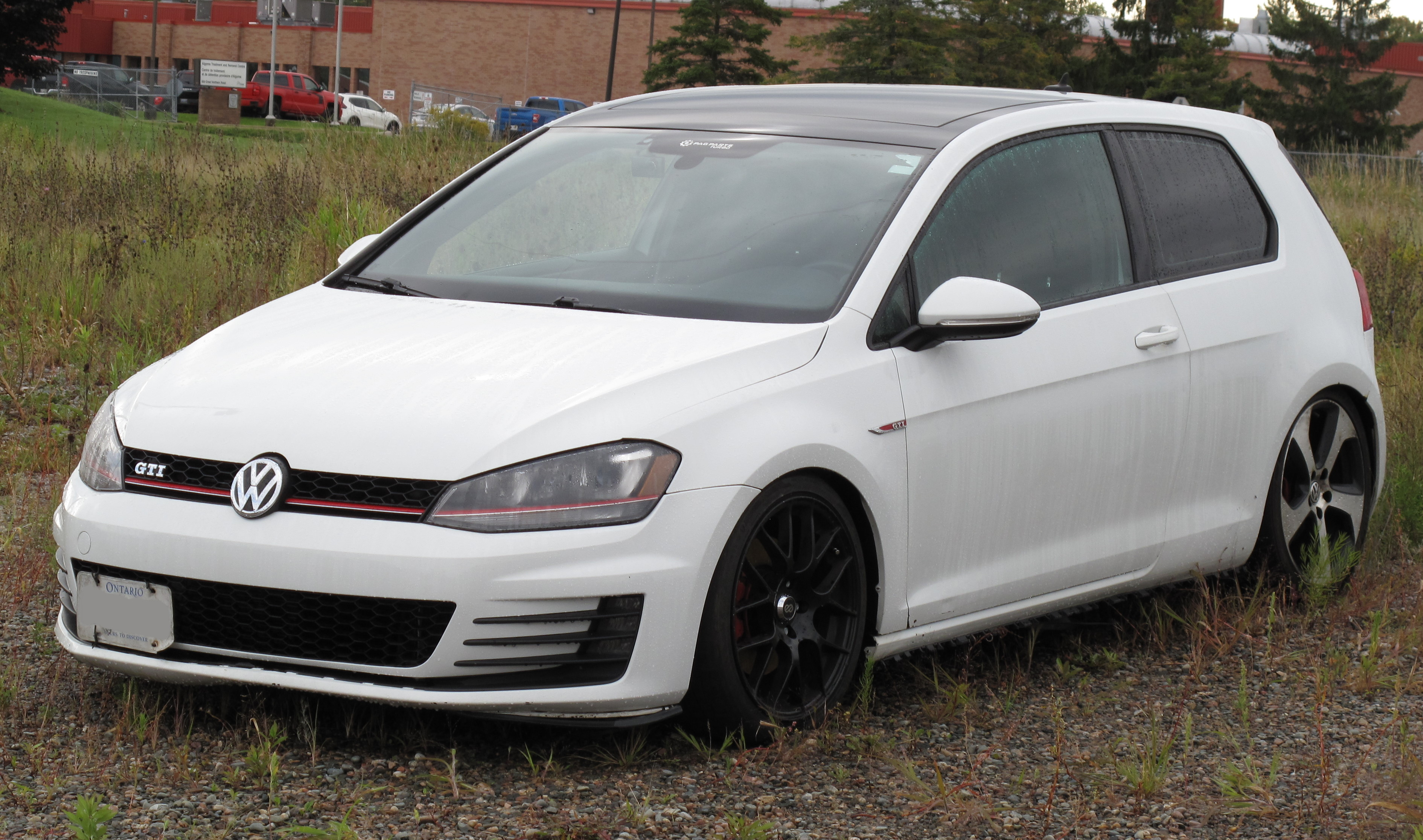

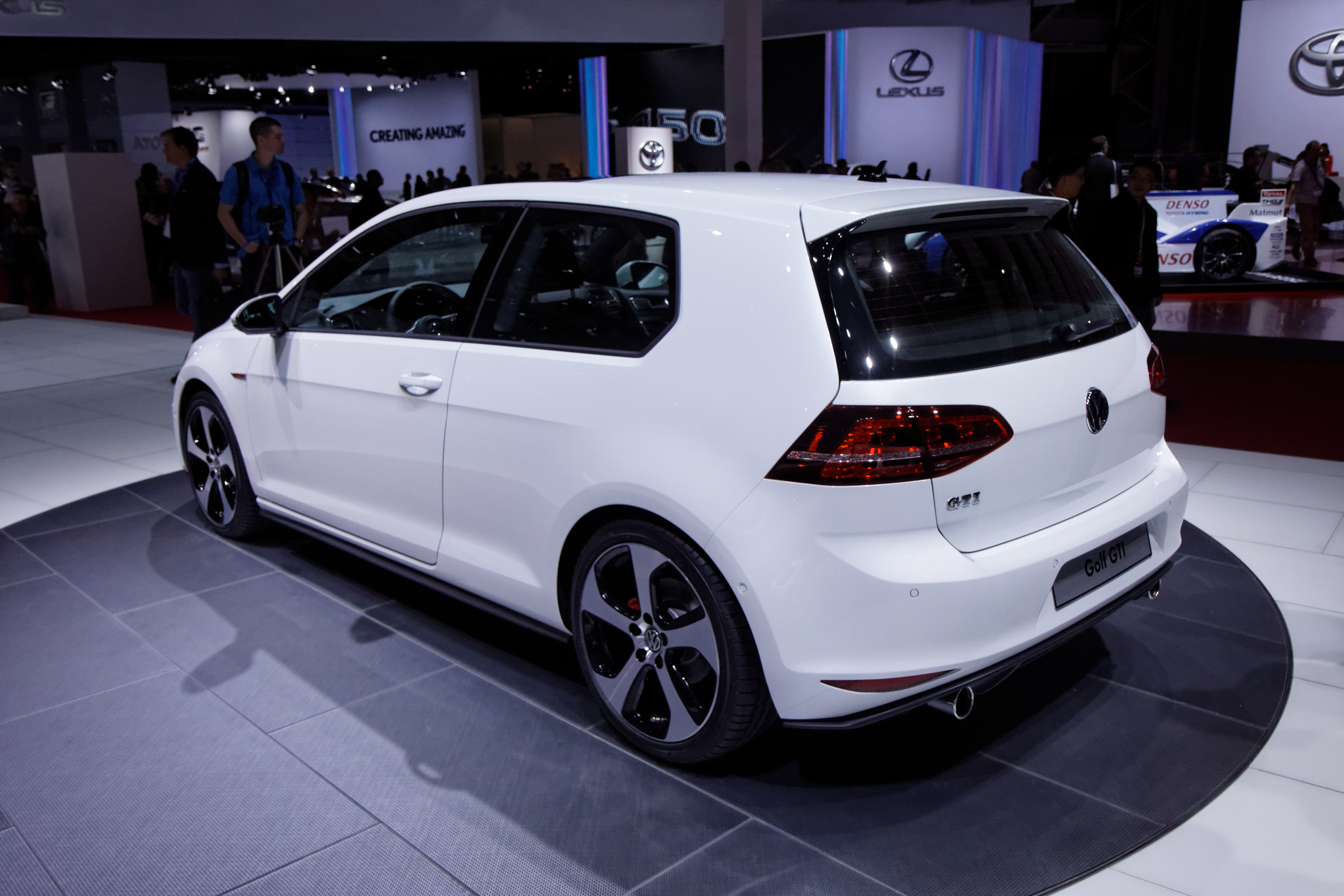
3-door hatchback (pre-facelift)

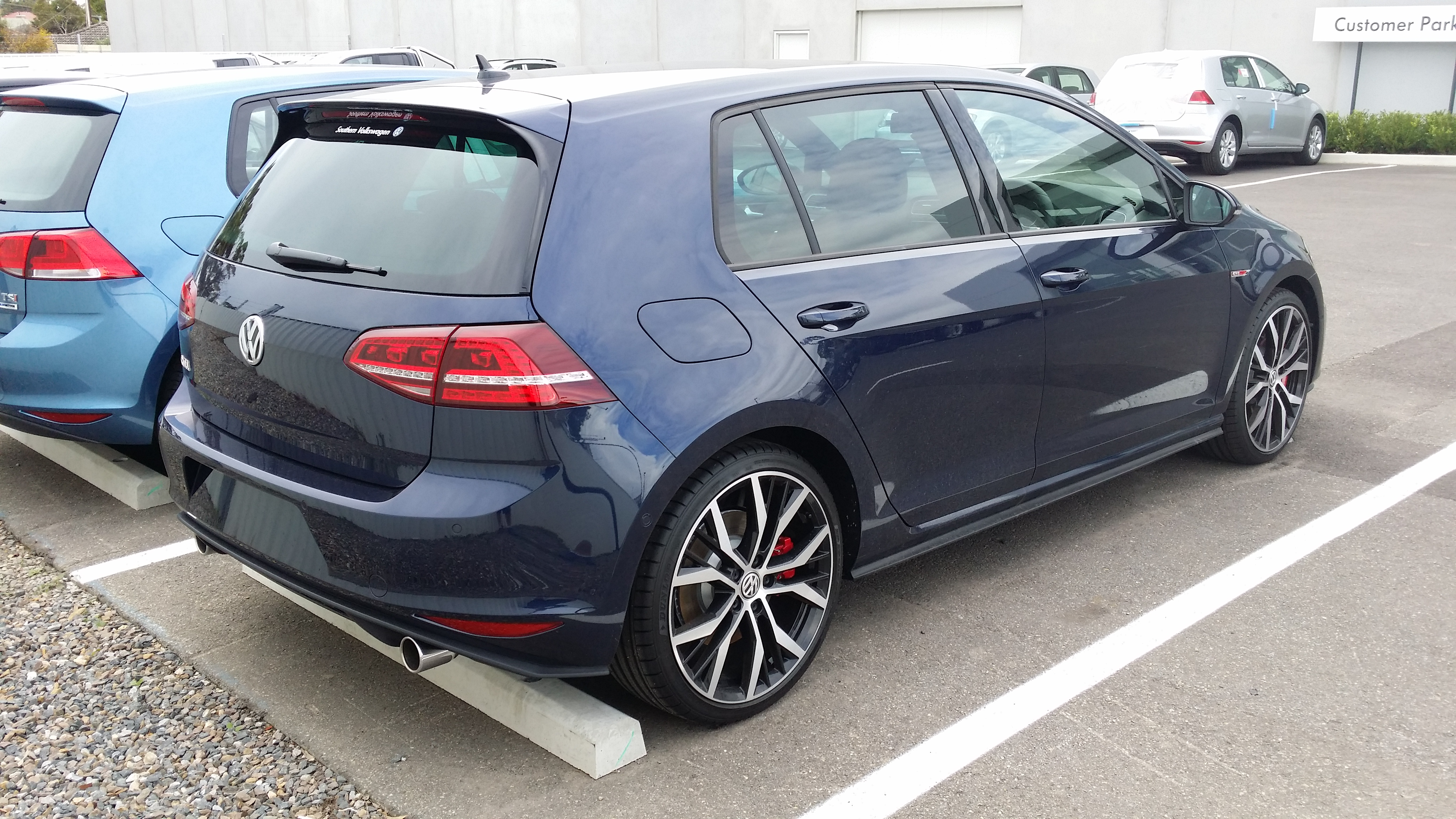
5-door hatchback (pre-facelift)

The Golf Mk7 GTI is powered by a 2.0-litre turbocharged direct-injection petrol engine (TSI) with 220 PS (162 kW; 217 hp). In the GTI Performance version, the engine's maximum power is boosted to 230 PS (169 kW; 227 hp). Both GTI models develop 350 N⋅m (36 kg⋅m; 258 lb⋅ft) of torque. The standard GTI accelerates from 0 to 100 km/h in 6.5 seconds and can reach a top speed of 250 km/h. The GTI Performance has a top speed of 250 km/h and accelerates from 0 to 100 km/h (62 mph) in 6.4 seconds.

Both versions of the GTI have a start-stop system and meet 2014 Euro 6 emissions standards. With a six-speed manual gearbox, they achieve the same low fuel consumption of 47.1 mpg_{‑imp} (6.00 L/100 km) (CO_{2} emissions of 139 g/km). This means the latest Golf GTI offers an 18 percent improvement in fuel economy over the previous model. With the optional six-speed DSG gearbox, the two GTI models achieve fuel consumption figures of 44.1 mpg_{‑imp} (6.41 L/100 km) (equivalent to 148 g/km CO_{2} for the standard GTI and 149 g/km CO_{2} for the GTI Performance).

Buyers who purchase the £980 Performance Pack gain not only 7 kW but also upgraded brakes and a limited-slip differential. The front differential is a new development, dubbed VAQ. This provides more neutral and agile driving behaviour and allows higher speeds to be carried through curves. The system consists of a multi-plate coupler between the differential cage and right driveshaft, which controls locking torque electro-hydraulically. Visually, vehicles with the Performance Pack are distinguished by 'GTI' lettering on the front brake caliper, larger vented brake discs front and rear (the same as fitted to the 'R' version), and red GTI badges on the front and rear, although some cars still retained their silver badging despite being fitted with the Performance Pack.

Alongside high performance, the Golf GTI comes standard with a high level of safety equipment. On top of high passive safety levels—thanks in part to a passenger cell made from high- and ultra-high strength steels—active safety features include the Automatic Post-Collision Braking system, which automatically applies the vehicle brakes after an accident to reduce the chances of a second impact; the pre-crash system, which tensions seatbelts and closes windows and the sunroof if an accident is likely to improve the effectiveness of the airbags; and seven airbags as standard, including one for the driver's knees.

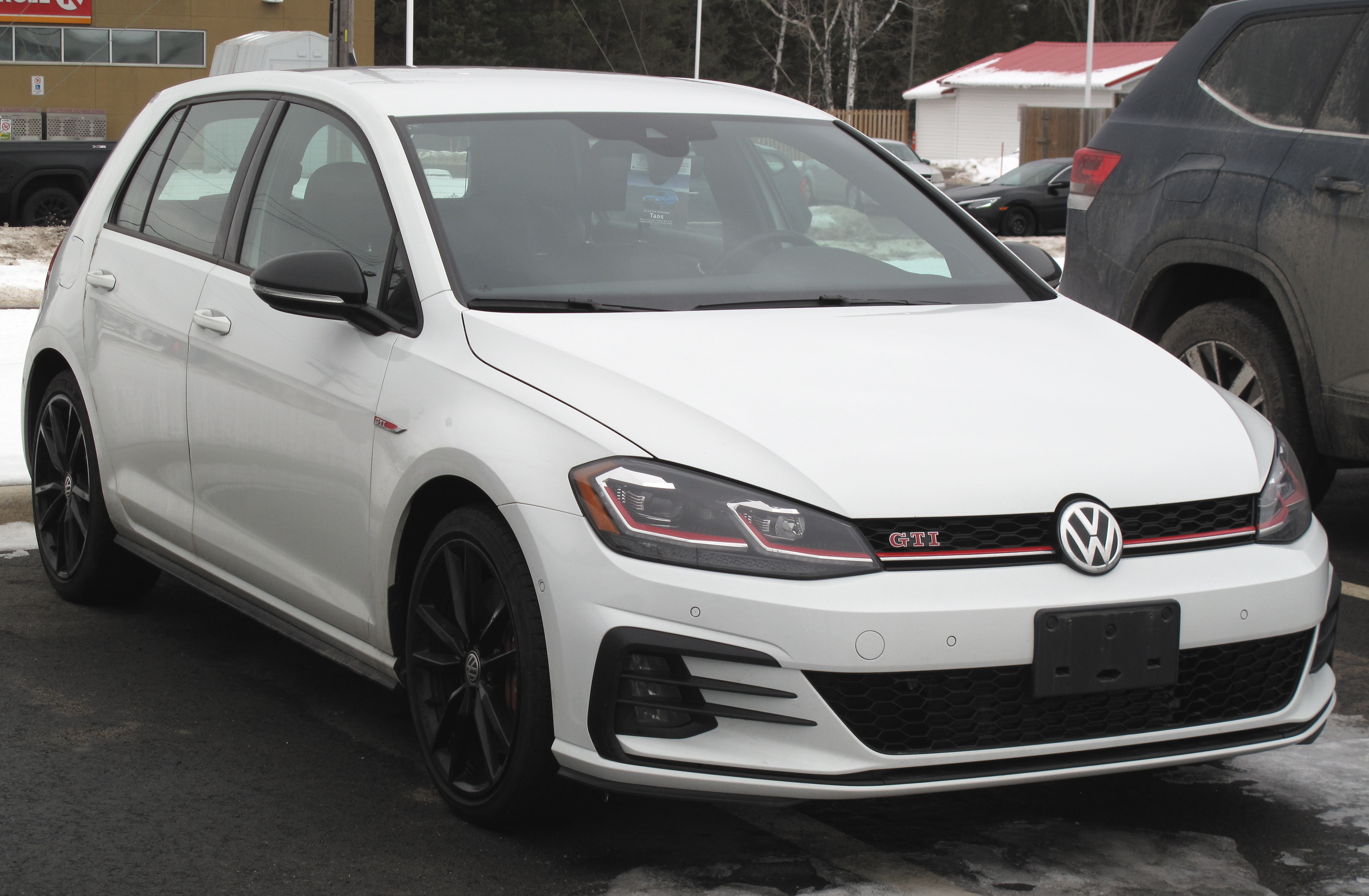

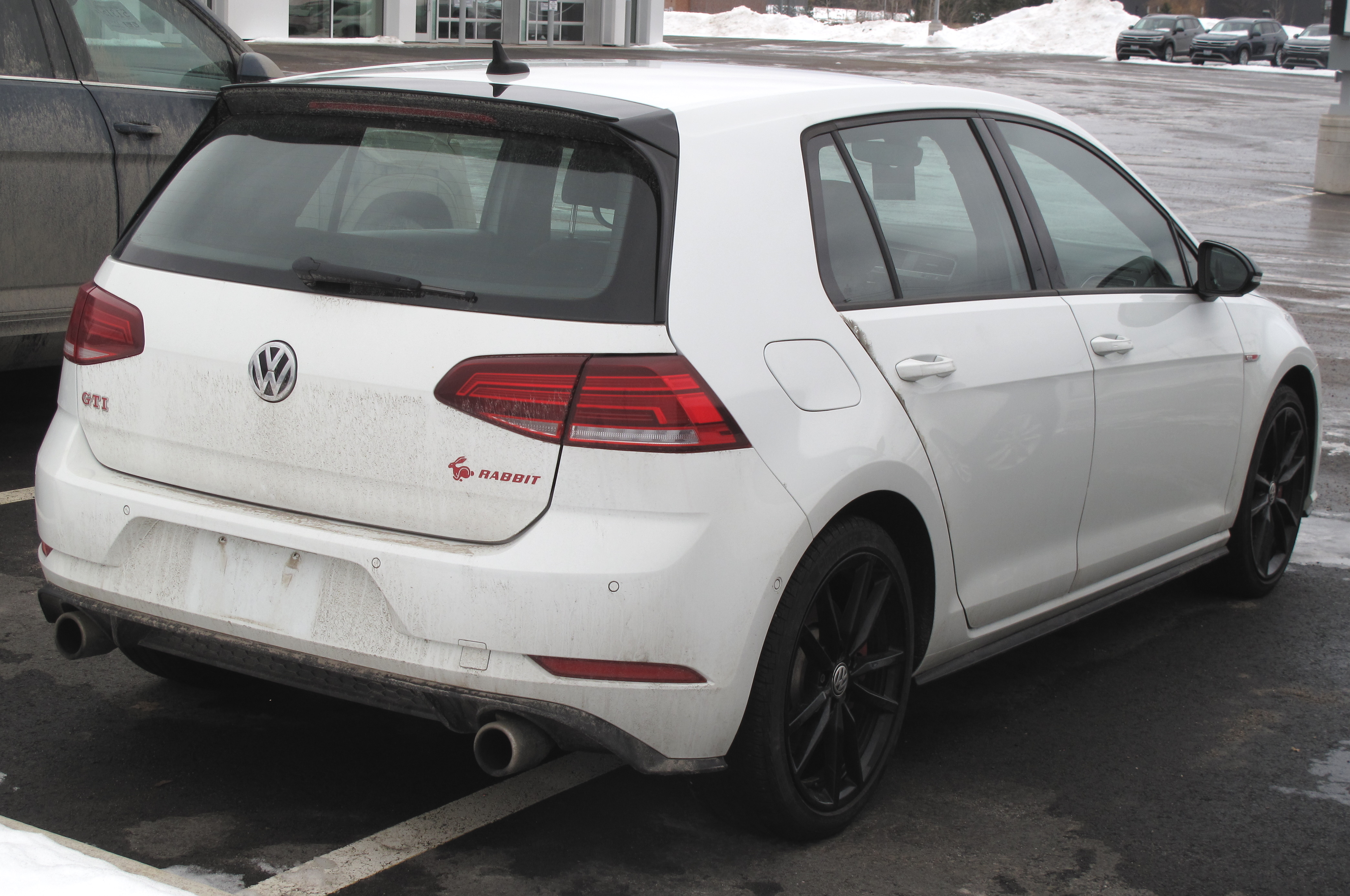
Rabbit Edition GTI (Canada)

In many markets, including Mexico and South Africa, the GTI is available only with the five-door body style, with no plans to introduce a three-door version.

Volkswagen introduced a "Rabbit Edition" GTI for the 2019 model year. The Rabbit Edition featured an LED lighting package, a "Vmax" spoiler, 18-inch "Pretoria" alloy wheels painted in gloss black, and red tags embroidered with the VW Rabbit logo on the seat.

Volkswagen's Mexican division introduced an "Oettinger" version of the GTI for the 2021 model year. The Oettinger version features an aerodynamic kit for the front fascia with a lip and splitters, side skirts, a new rear bumper with an integrated diffuser, and a new spoiler with flaps, which stand out next to the version-specific 18-inch wheel set and black side mirrors. It is available in three colour options: Pure White, Tornado Red and Cornflower Blue. It will go on sale on 7 December 2020, and only 700 units will be built.

=== GTI Clubsport (2016) ===
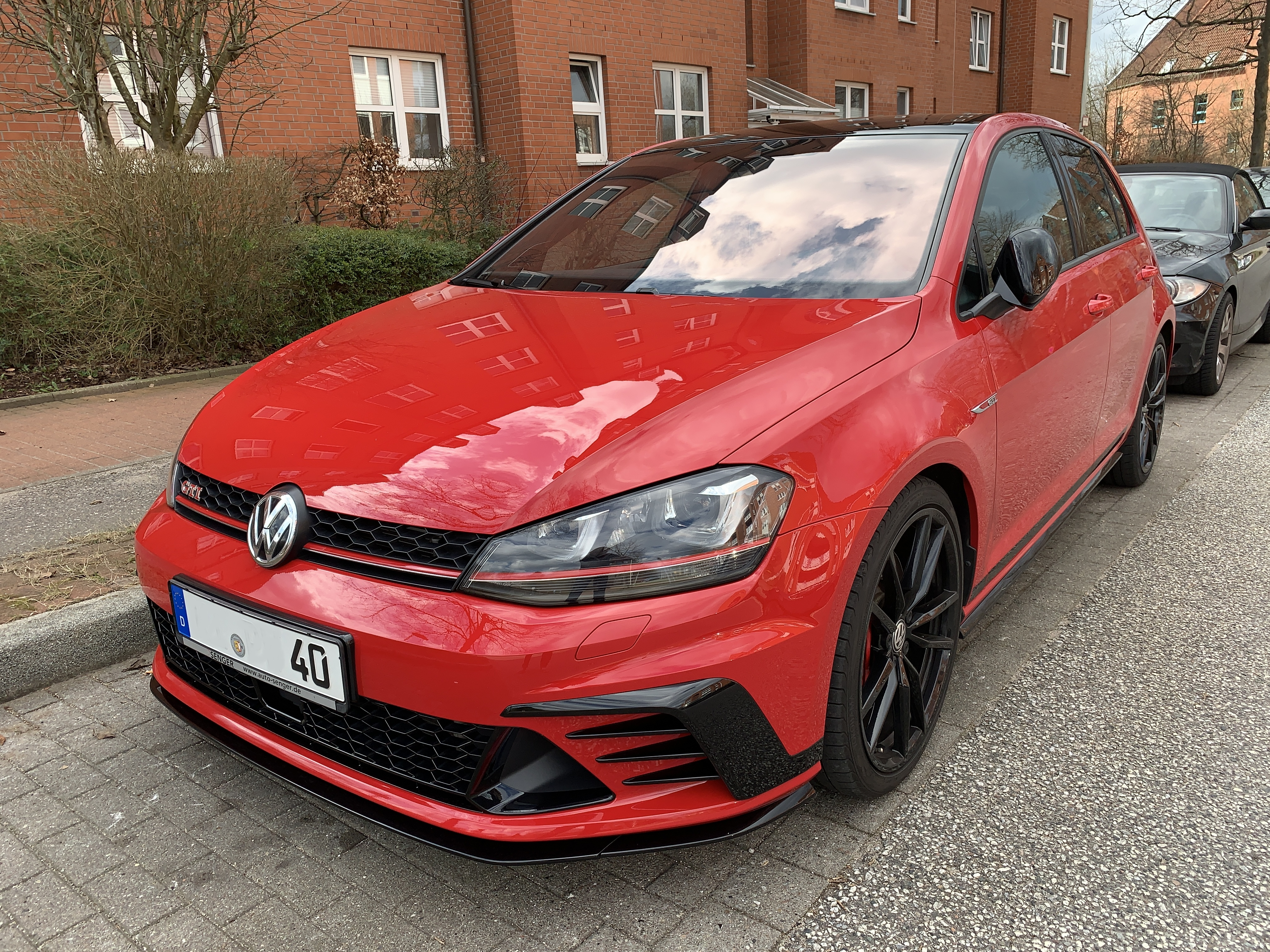
Golf GTI Clubsport

Volkswagen introduced the special-edition GTI Clubsport for 2016 to coincide with the GTI's 40th anniversary. The Clubsport was not available in the United States. Externally, the Clubsport features a revised front fascia, a more aggressive rear hatch spoiler, a new rear diffuser with larger exhaust tips, and a black stripe along the lower sides of the body. Inside, the Clubsport has bucket seats and an Alcantara steering wheel and shift lever.

The Clubsport uses the same 2.0-litre EA888 turbocharged inline-4 as the standard GTI which has been revised to produce 261 horsepower, with up to 286 horsepower for 10 seconds at a time via an included overboost feature which raises the engine's boost pressure by 0.2 bar, up to 2.1 bar. Transmission choices remain the same as the standard GTI, with both the 6-speed manual and 6-speed DSG available, both equipped with the standard GTI's optional limited-slip differential. Weight is listed as 1,375 kg. The Clubsport was available from the factory with optional Michelin Pilot Sport Cup 2 tires. The official 0-to-60 mph time is quoted as 5.9 seconds, 0.6 seconds quicker than the standard GTI with Performance Package.

=== GTI Clubsport S (2016) ===
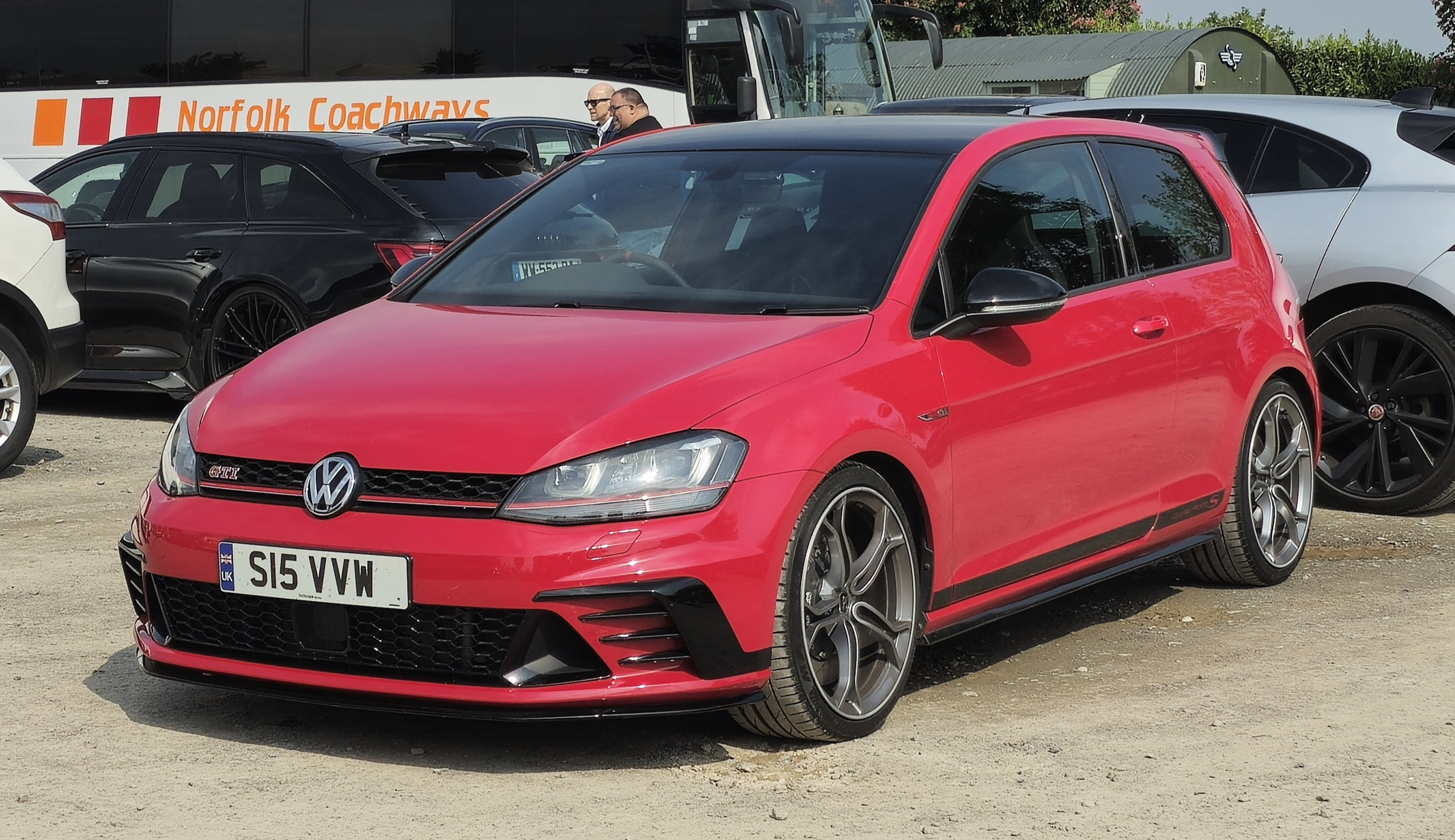
Golf GTi Clubsport S

The 3-door GTI Clubsport S was a limited-edition version of the GTI Clubsport sold as a higher-strung version optimized for faster track times. Only 400 were produced for the 2016 model year. Upgrades from the Clubsport to the Clubsport S include new front suspension and subframe components, updated suspension alignment, upgraded brakes, a more highly-strung version of the GTI's 2.0L EA888 turbocharged inline-4, using the larger IHI IS38 turbocharger instead of the IS20, that produces 310 PS (228 kW; 306 hp) and 385 N⋅m (39 kg⋅m; 284 lb⋅ft) of torque, standard Michelin Pilot Sport Cup 2 track-oriented tires, removal of the rear seats and some sound deadening, and a quoted weight of 2,998 pounds (1,360 kg).

The result of these modifications is a lap time of 7 minutes, 49.21 seconds around the Nürburgring Nordschleife track, 1.4 seconds faster than the Honda Civic Type R, which held the previous record for a front-wheel drive production car. The Clubsport S was released with an estimated base price of £35,000.

=== GTI TCR (2019) ===
In January 2019, Volkswagen introduced new high-performance variation, the Golf GTI TCR with 290 PS 2-litre engine and special trim.

Units were largely limited in production.

Australia received an allocation of 300 vehicles in total, 100 units in each of the three available colors - red, grey and white. All the vehicles arrived in the fourth quarter of 2020 for the MY20 model year. They were sold as the final GTI examples for the Mk7 shape.

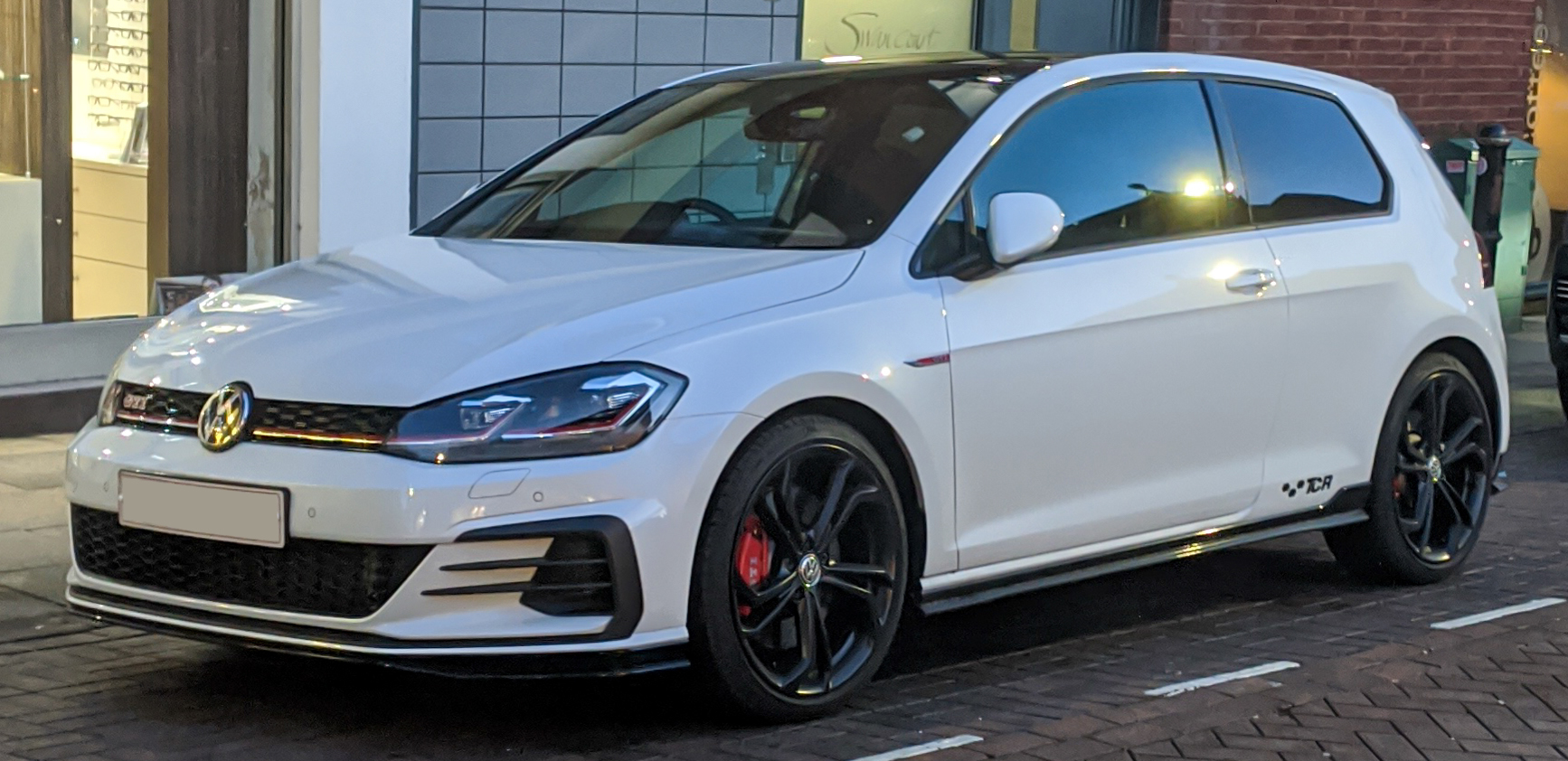
Golf GTI TCR (3-door)

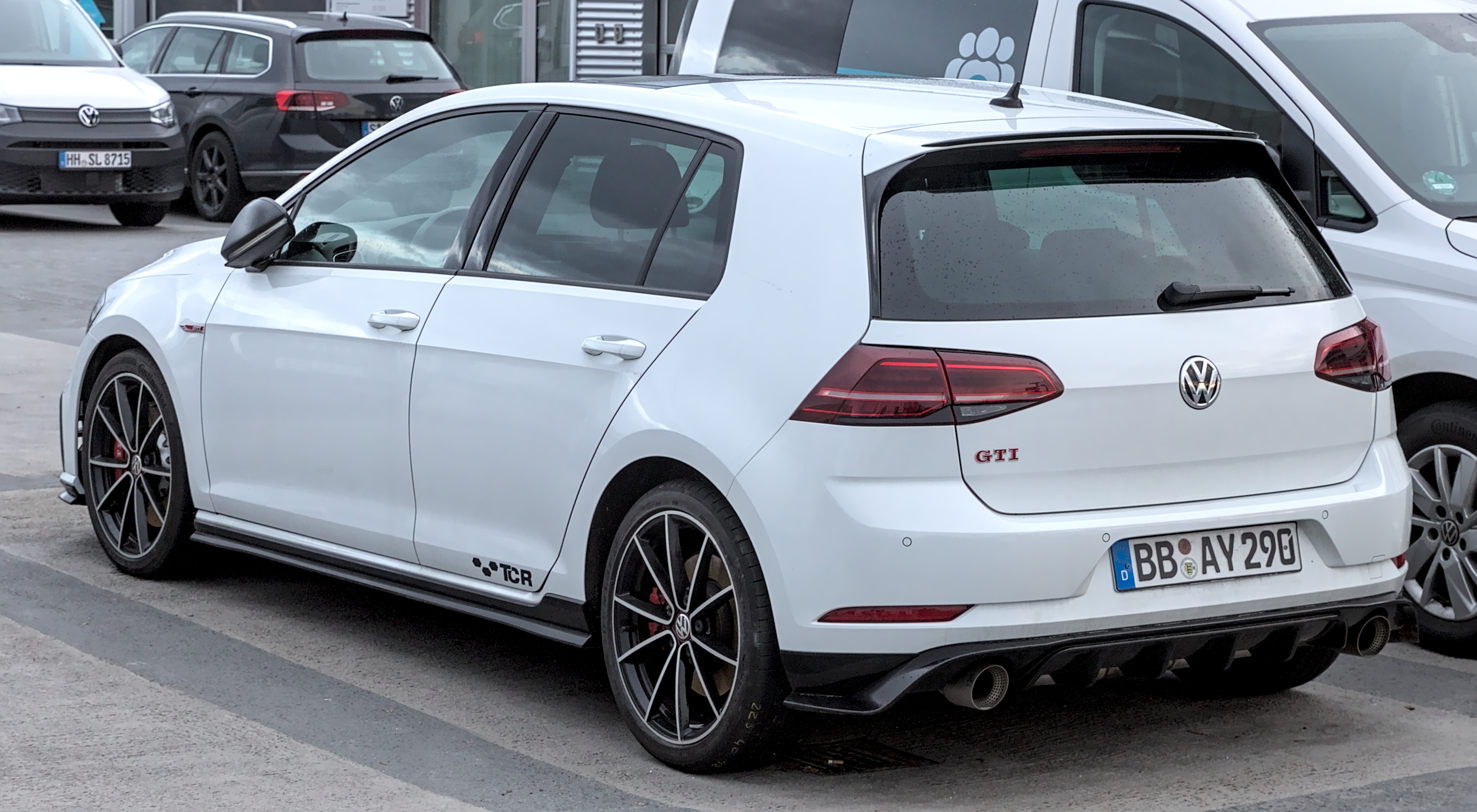
Golf GTI TCR (5-door)

== Golf R ==
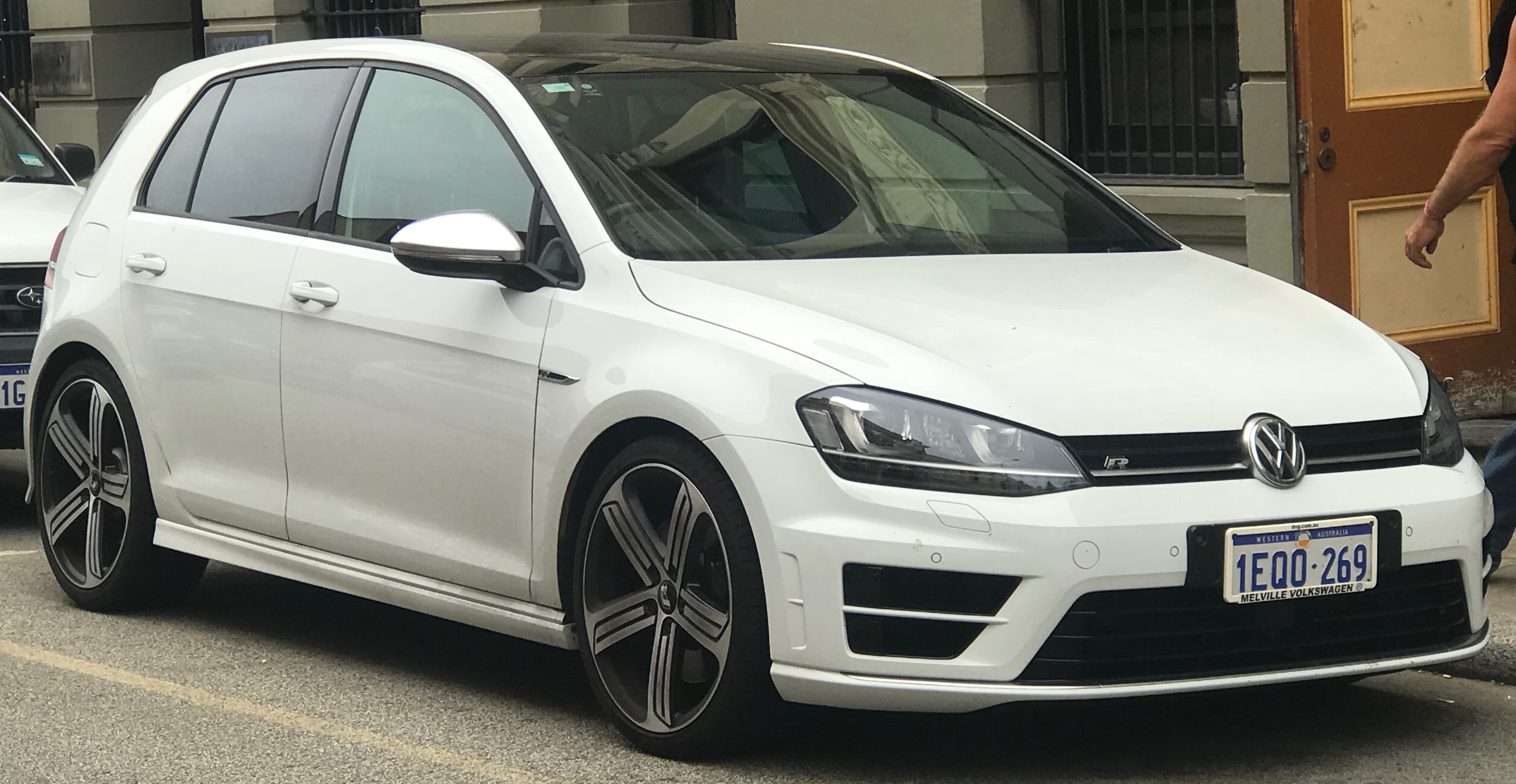

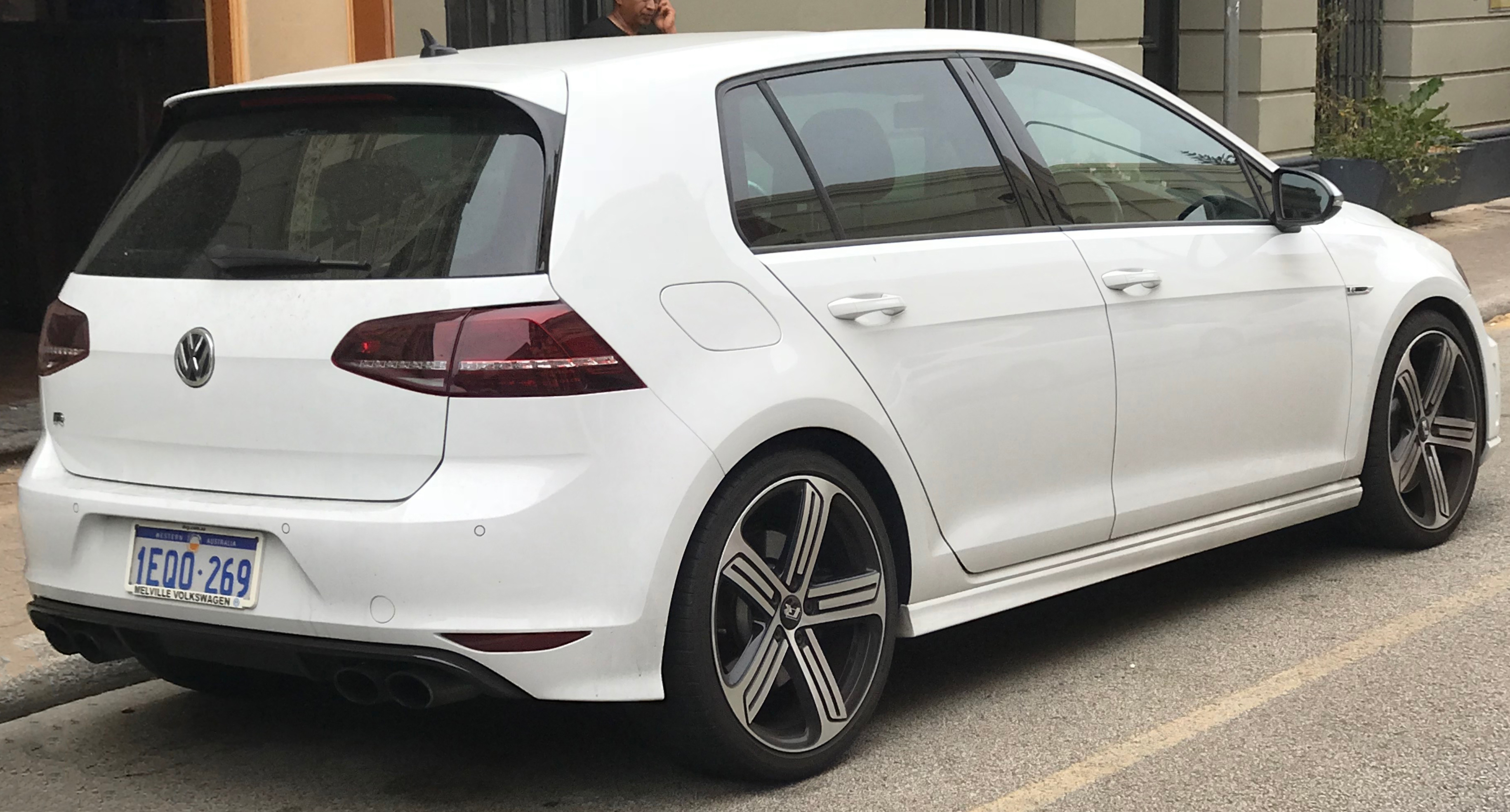
Golf R hatchback (pre-facelift)

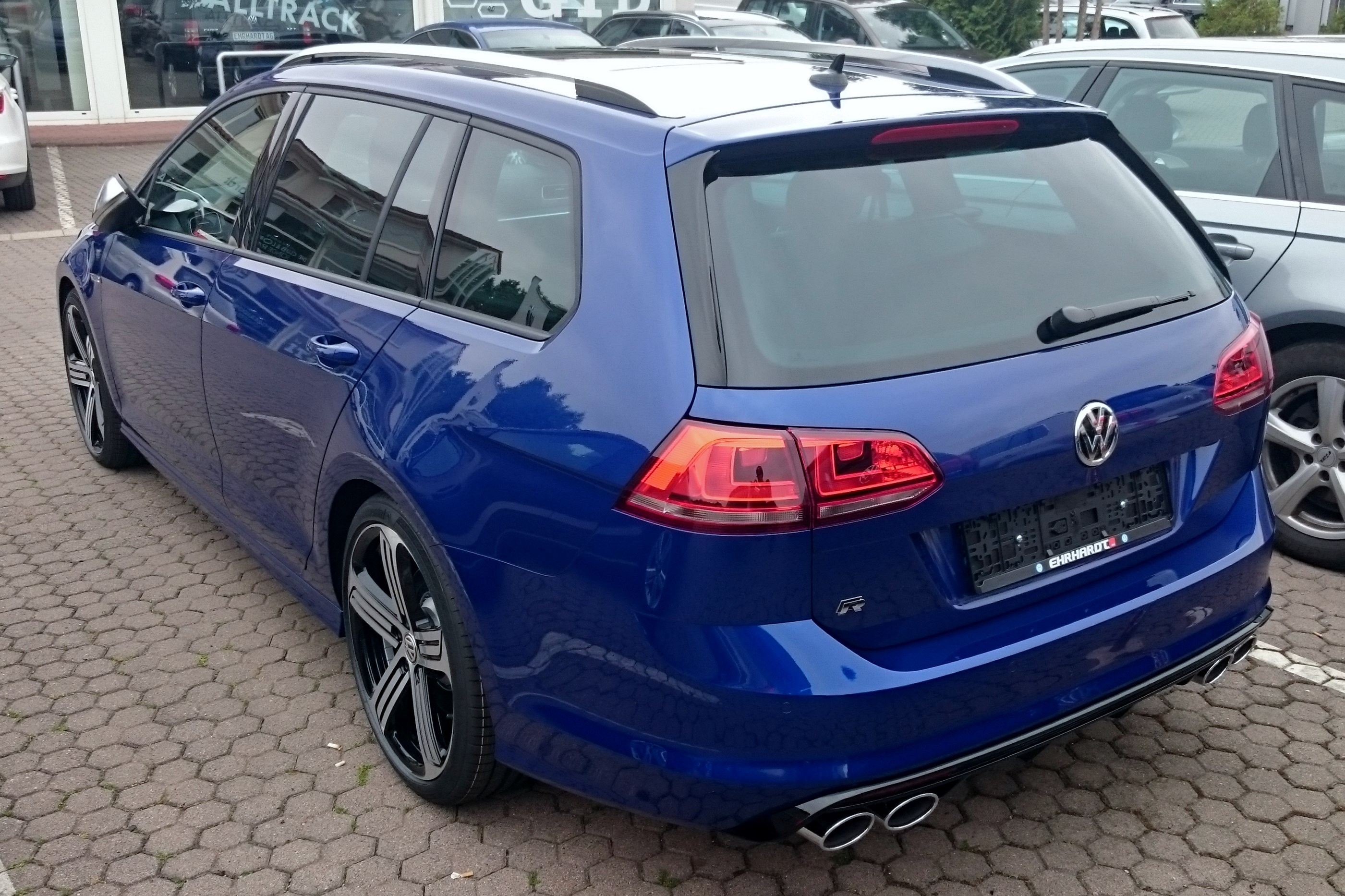
Golf R wagon (pre-facelift)

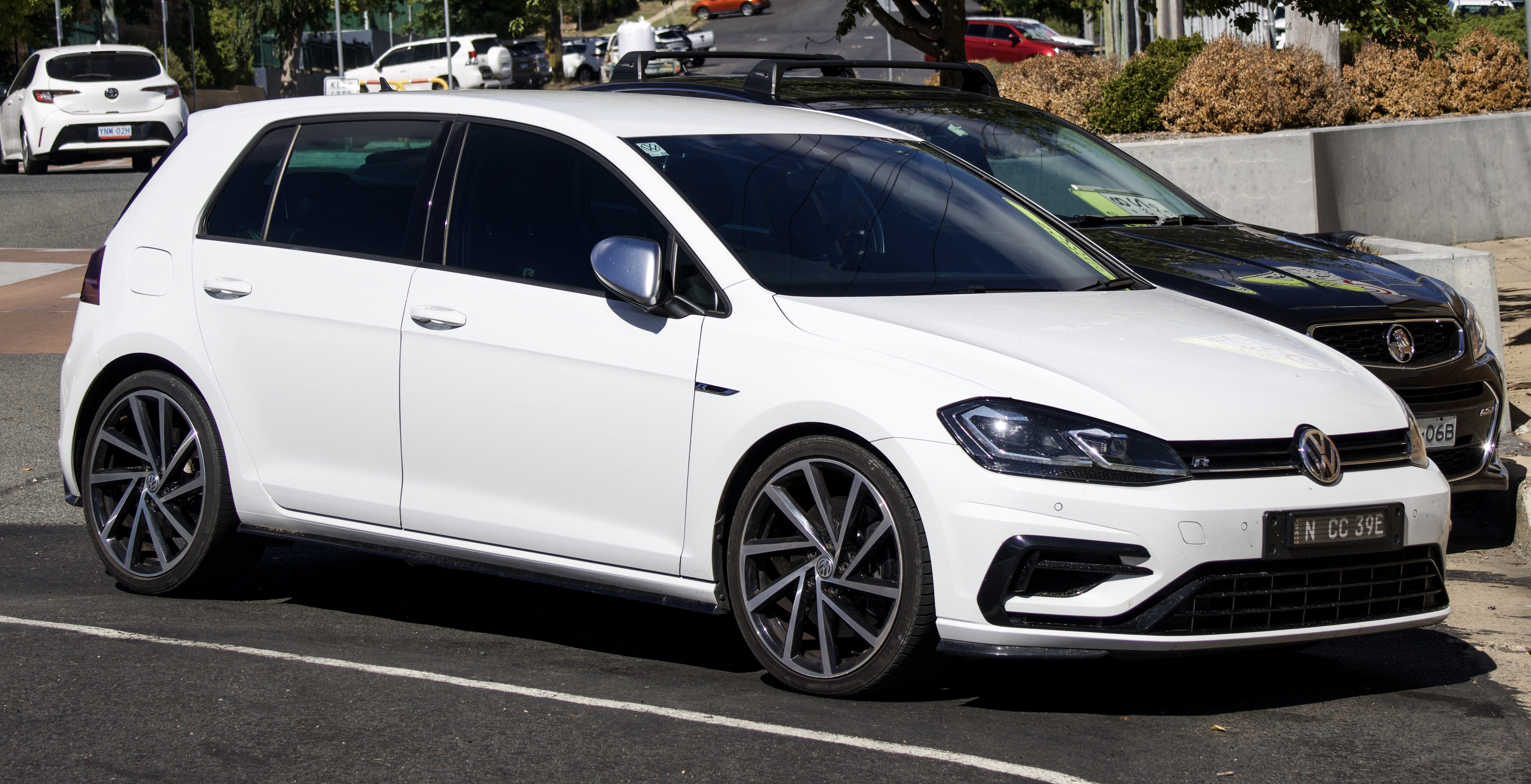

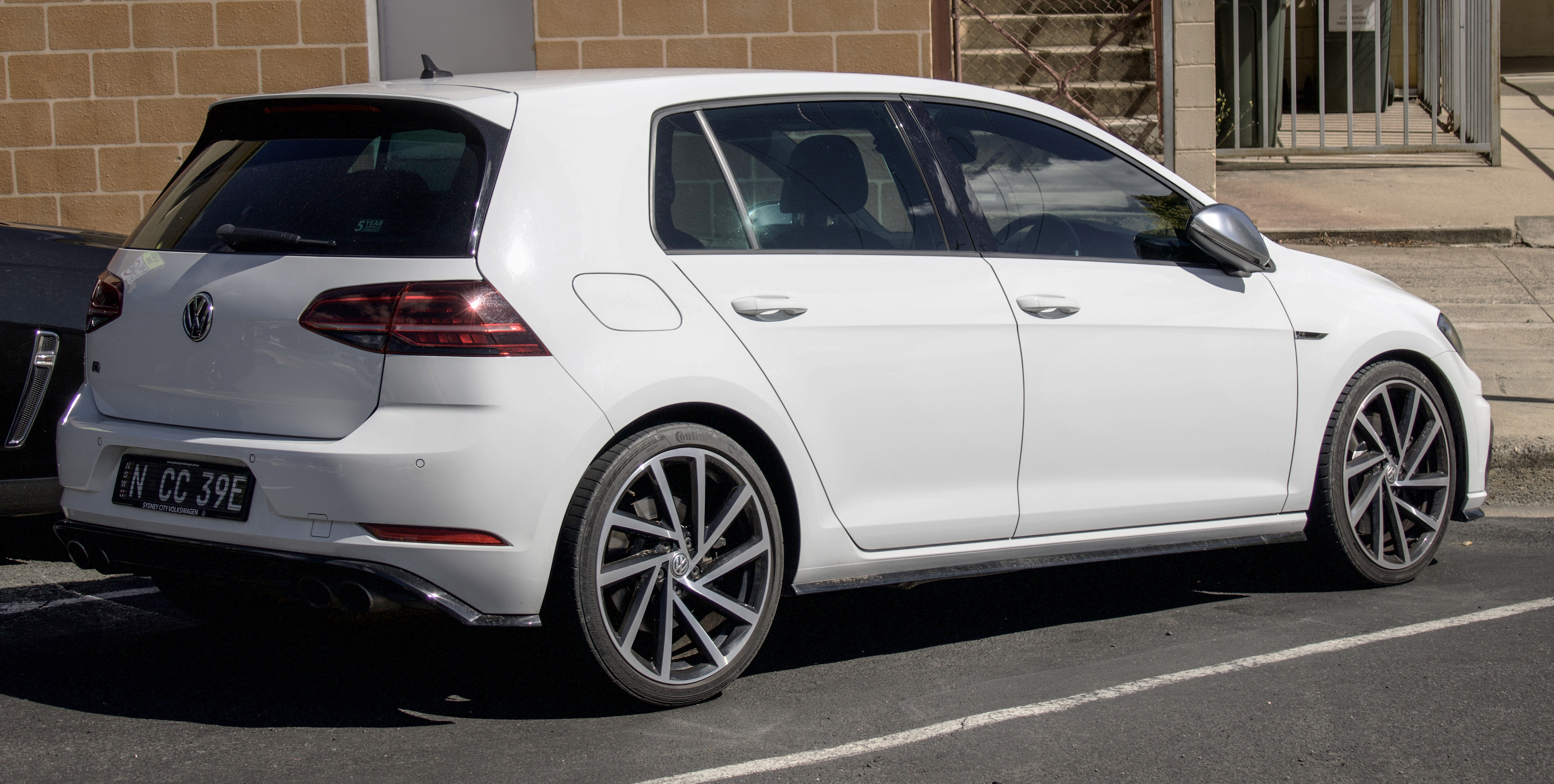
Golf R hatchback (post-facelift)

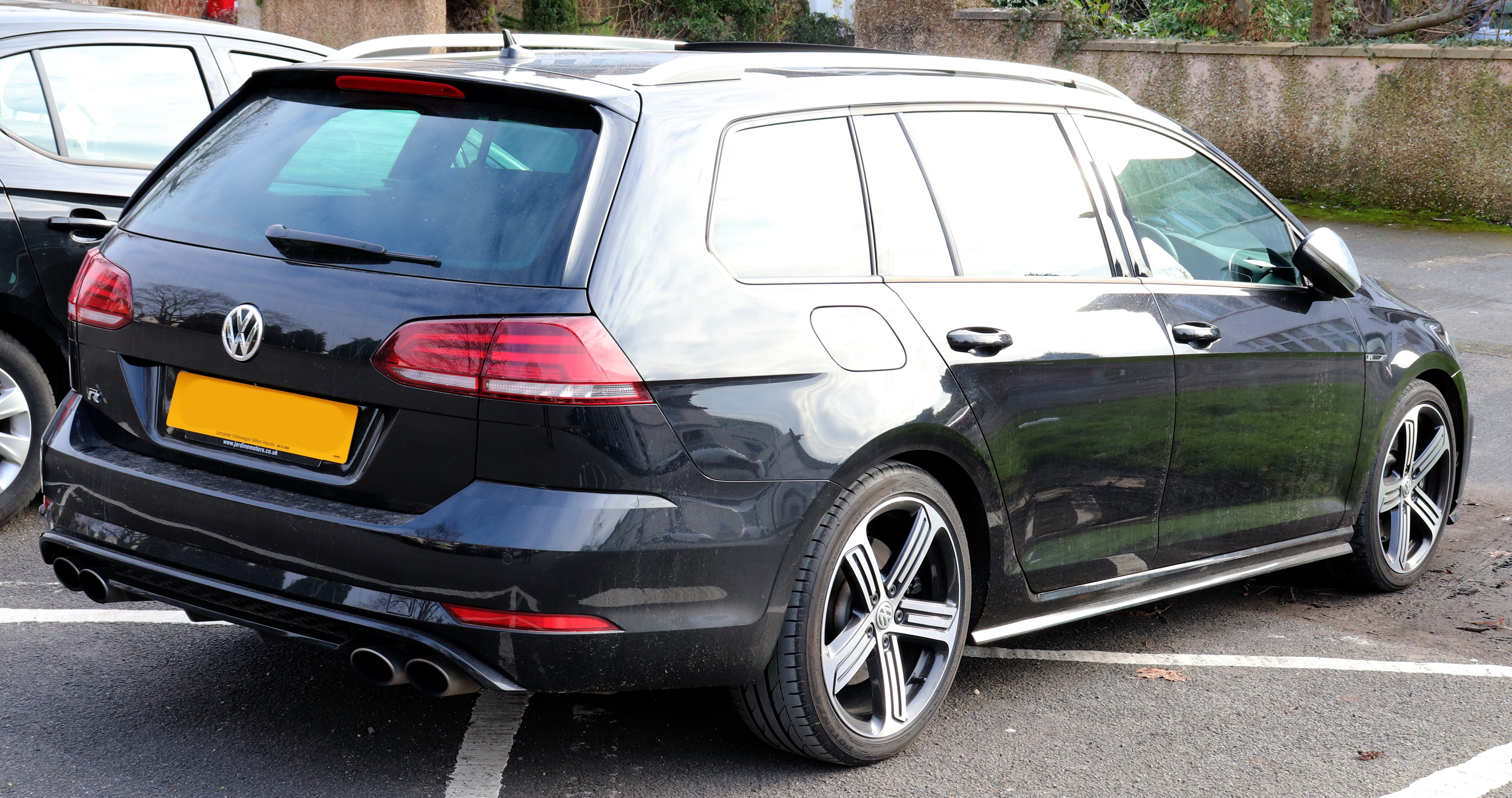
Golf R wagon (post-facelift)

Like the GTI, the Golf R is also built as a three- or five-door hatchback and there's also a wagon version. It is powered by a newly developed version of the 1,984 cc (2.0 L; 121.1 cu in) turbocharged EA888 petrol FSI straight-four engine used in the latest Golf GTI, Audi S3, Volkswagen Tiguan and Jetta, and dozens of other Volkswagen AG vehicles, but in this application, it produces 300 PS (221 kW; 296 hp) (or 280 PS (206 kW; 276 hp) for "hot climate" markets such as Australia, South Africa, Japan, and the US) from 5,500 to 6,200 rpm and 380 N⋅m (280 lb⋅ft) from 1,800 to 5,500 rpm of torque. Compared to the GTI's powerplant, the Golf R's engine has a modified cylinder head, exhaust valves, valve seats and springs, pistons, injection valves and larger intercooler and turbocharger. DSG-equipped models also come with an auxiliary oil cooler on the passenger side on right hand drive models.

0-62 mph (100 km/h) takes 5.1 seconds (versus 5.7 seconds for the previous Golf R) or 4.9 seconds with the optional DSG gearbox. The top speed is electronically limited to 155 mph (249 km/h). Despite this increased performance, a combined fuel consumption of 39.8 miles per imperial gallon (7.10 L/100 km; 33.1 mpg_{‑US}), and CO_{2} emissions of 165 g/km and emissions of 159 g/km DSG) make the Golf R up to 18 percent more efficient than its predecessor.

The R uses an updated, fifth-generation Haldex 4MOTION four-wheel drive system. Under low loads or when coasting, the rear axle is decoupled, helping to reduce fuel consumption. Drive to the rear axle can be engaged in fractions of a second via the Haldex coupling, which is actuated by an electro-hydraulic pump. Up to 50 percent of power can be transferred to the rear axle. A brake-actuated XDS+ system mimics a limited-slip differential by applying the brakes to the wheel with the least traction, this is on both the front and rear axles.

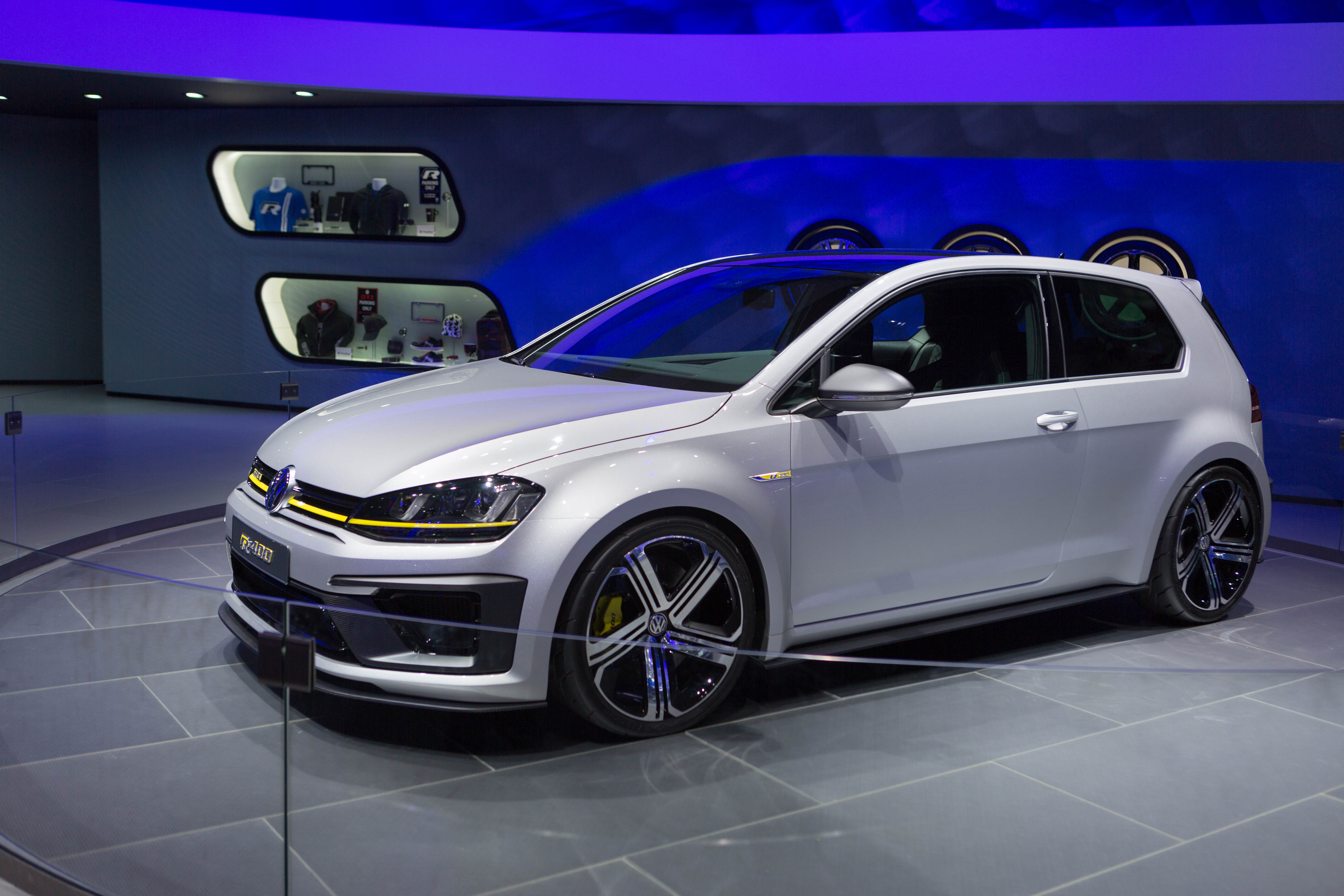
Golf R 400

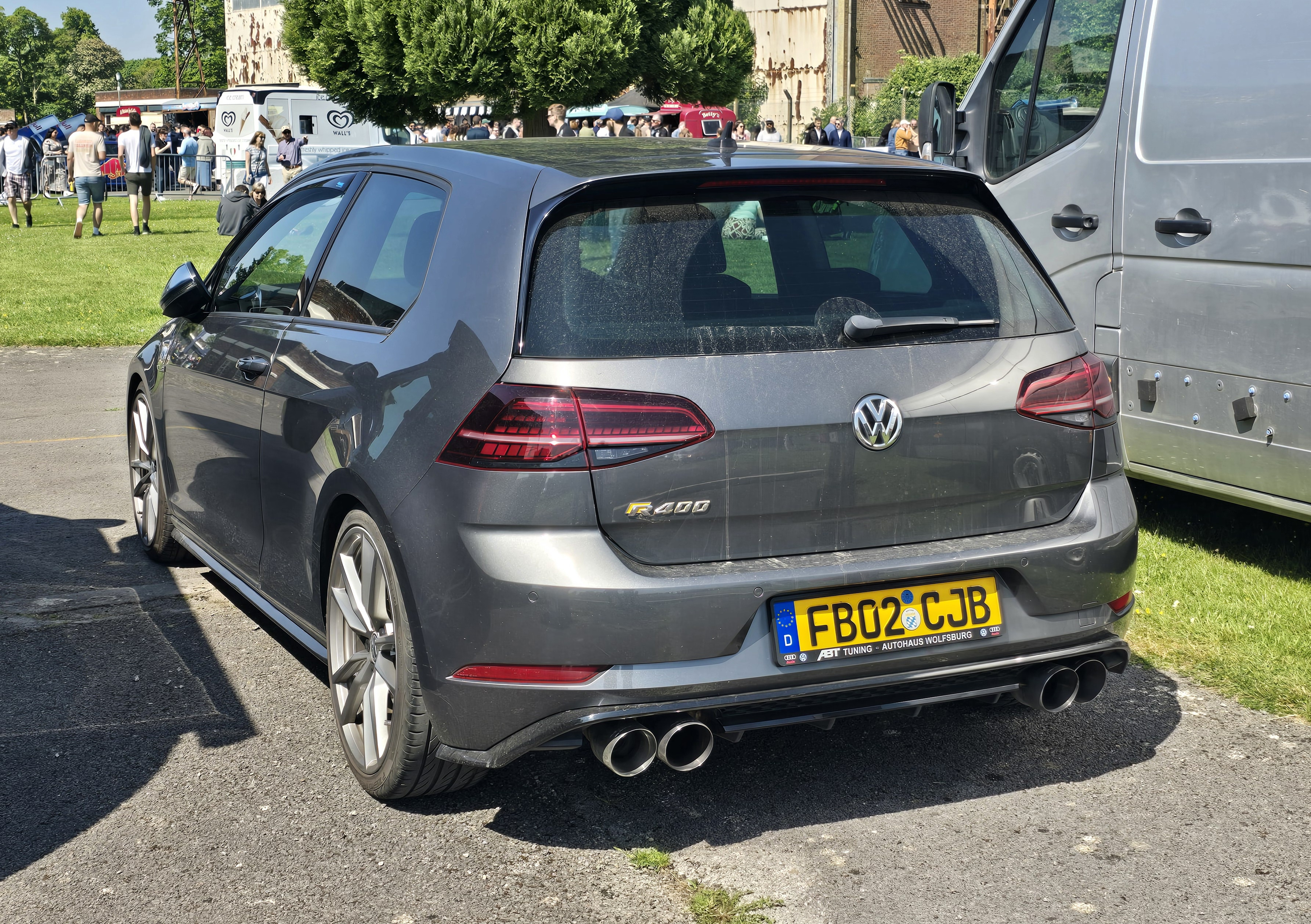
Golf R 400

The ride height is 20 mm lower than the standard Golf. Golf R models equipped with the optional 'DCC' (Dynamic Chassis Control) offer three suspension modes: 'Comfort', 'Normal', and 'Race'. Each mode adjusts the stiffness of the suspension damping, thereby offering drivers a way to change the way the vehicle responds with the push of a button. Comfort mode places the dampers in the softest setting, increasing the absorption of road imperfections and allowing for a smoother and more comfortable ride. Race mode stiffens the dampers to their most aggressive setting, reducing body movements and increasing adhesion to the road for more precise high-speed driving. Race mode also increases throttle response, firms up the steering for a heftier feel, and alters the shift pattern of the DSG gearbox (where fitted), and increases the speed of the Adaptive headlamps (AFS) response time.

On top of ESC Sport mode, as found on the GTI and GTD, which delays intervention of the electronic stability control system, the R offers the option fully to disengage the ESC, for track driving.

For the Canadian market, the optional Discover Pro 8" infotainment system is available as part of the single option "Technology Package," while only the 6.5" Discover is available to US consumers. In North America, the Golf R comes standard with halogen tail lights and HID bi-xenon headlights with LED front and side view mirror turn signals, while ROW markets received the options for a sunroof, a three-door version, and LED tail lights. All these features are not available in the North American version. The Golf R and e-Golf are the only Golf models available in North America that was produced in Germany. Other Golf models for the North American market are produced by Volkswagen de México in Puebla, Mexico.

A limited edition Golf R400 was rumored in August 2015 by Heinz-Jakob Neusser, then-head of brand development, but in the wake of the Volkswagen emissions scandal (and Neusser's suspension) it was cancelled in favor of focusing on the Golf R.

For the South African market, the Golf R received another upgrade in power in March 2019. The upgrade resulted in 310 PS (228 kW; 306 hp) and 400 N⋅m (41 kg⋅m; 295 lb⋅ft) of torque (up from 290 PS (213 kW; 286 hp) and 380 N⋅m (39 kg⋅m; 280 lb⋅ft) in the facelift seen in July 2017). Additionally, the Golf R was also optionally available with an Akrapovič performance exhaust from the factory.

The Mk7 Golf R was discontinued in the United States in August 2019.

=== Spektrum Program ===
For the 2018 model year in Canada and 2019 model year in both Canada and the United States, Volkswagen offered 40 custom-order paint colours for the Golf R as part of their Spektrum Program. The program was initially introduced only for Canadian-market e-Golfs. Many of the colours offered were previously available on past Volkswagen Group models. The option carried a lead time of two to four months, as each car ordered as part of the Spektrum program was hand-painted in a separate facility from the main production line. Each custom-order colour carried an MSRP in the United States of $2,500.

A total of 473 Spektrum Golf Rs were produced, with 199 going to the United States, before the Mk7 Golf R's discontinuation in North America.

== Facelift ==
In November 2016, Volkswagen revealed a facelifted version of the Golf Mk7. This model is referred to as the "New Golf" by Volkswagen, while it is often informally referred to as the Golf 7.5. A new engine was introduced along with the facelift: a 1.5-litre TSI which produces 95.6 kW (128.2 hp; 130.0 PS) or 110 kW (148 hp; 150 PS). Initially, the existing 1.4-litre TSI was available alongside the new 1.5-litre engine. The updated Golf GTI was increased from 162 kW (217 hp; 220 PS) to 169 kW (227 hp; 230 PS) in the standard car and from 169 kW (227 hp; 230 PS) to 180.2 kW (241.7 hp; 245.0 PS) with the Performance Pack. The Golf R similarly had its output increased from 221 kW (296 hp; 300 PS) to 228 kW (306 hp; 310 PS). In addition, the facelift increased infotainment screen size across the range, as well as adding the option for a fully digital dashboard. The rear lights now utilise LED technology as standard (including a "sweeping" indicator effect on performance models) while this technology is optional on most models for the headlights.

The facelifted Golf Mk7 was released in North America for the 2018 model year. The previous 1.8L EA888 engine was replaced by the 147 hp 1.4L EA211 engine as the only available powerplant, while the 5-speed manual and 6-speed automatic transmissions were replaced by 6- and 8-speed units, respectively. The all-wheel drive Golf Sportwagen and Golf Alltrack models retained the 1.8L EA888 engine along with the 6-speed manual or 6-speed DSG transmissions.

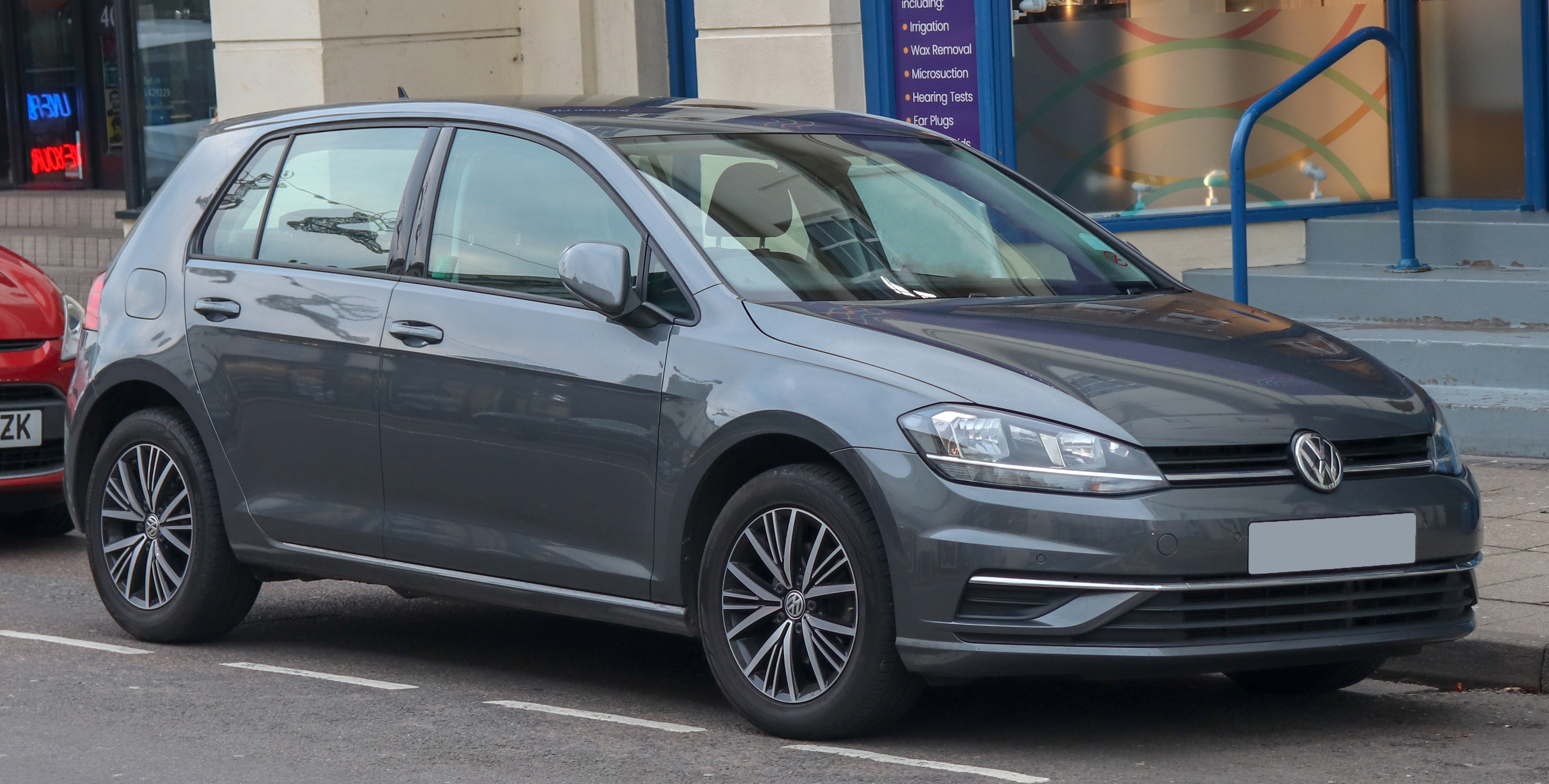
Standard (facelift)

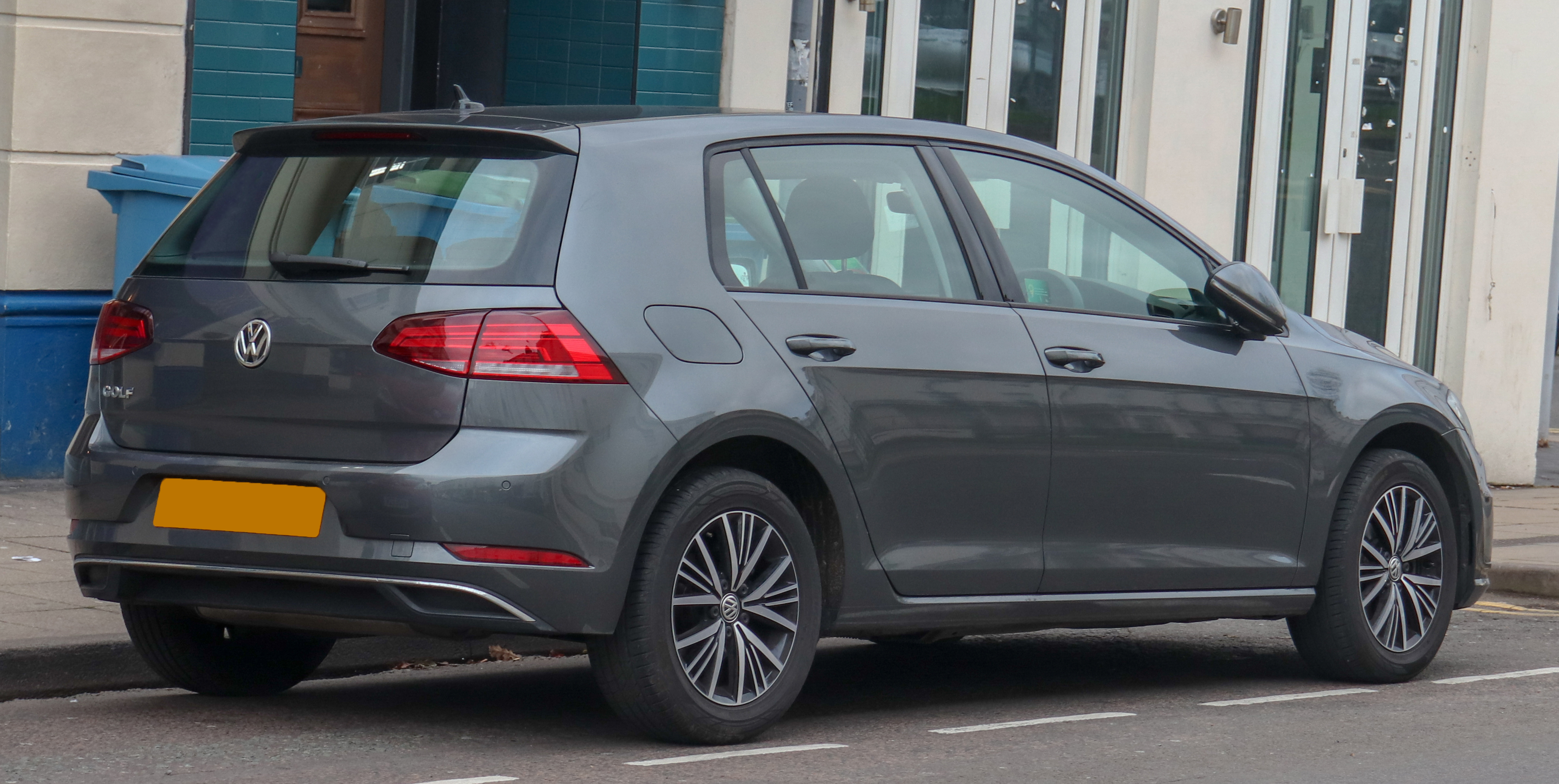
Standard (facelift)

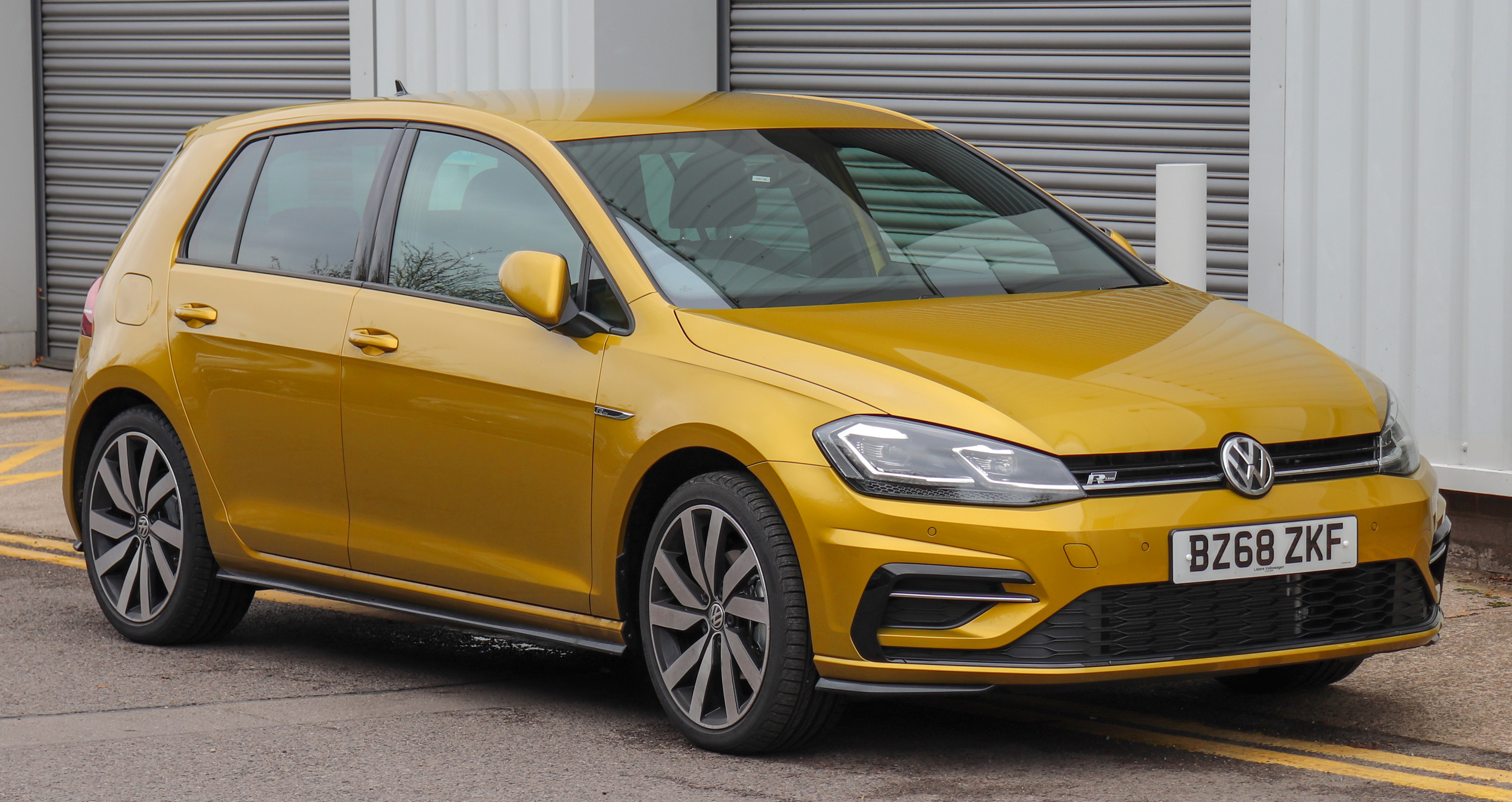
R-Line (facelift)

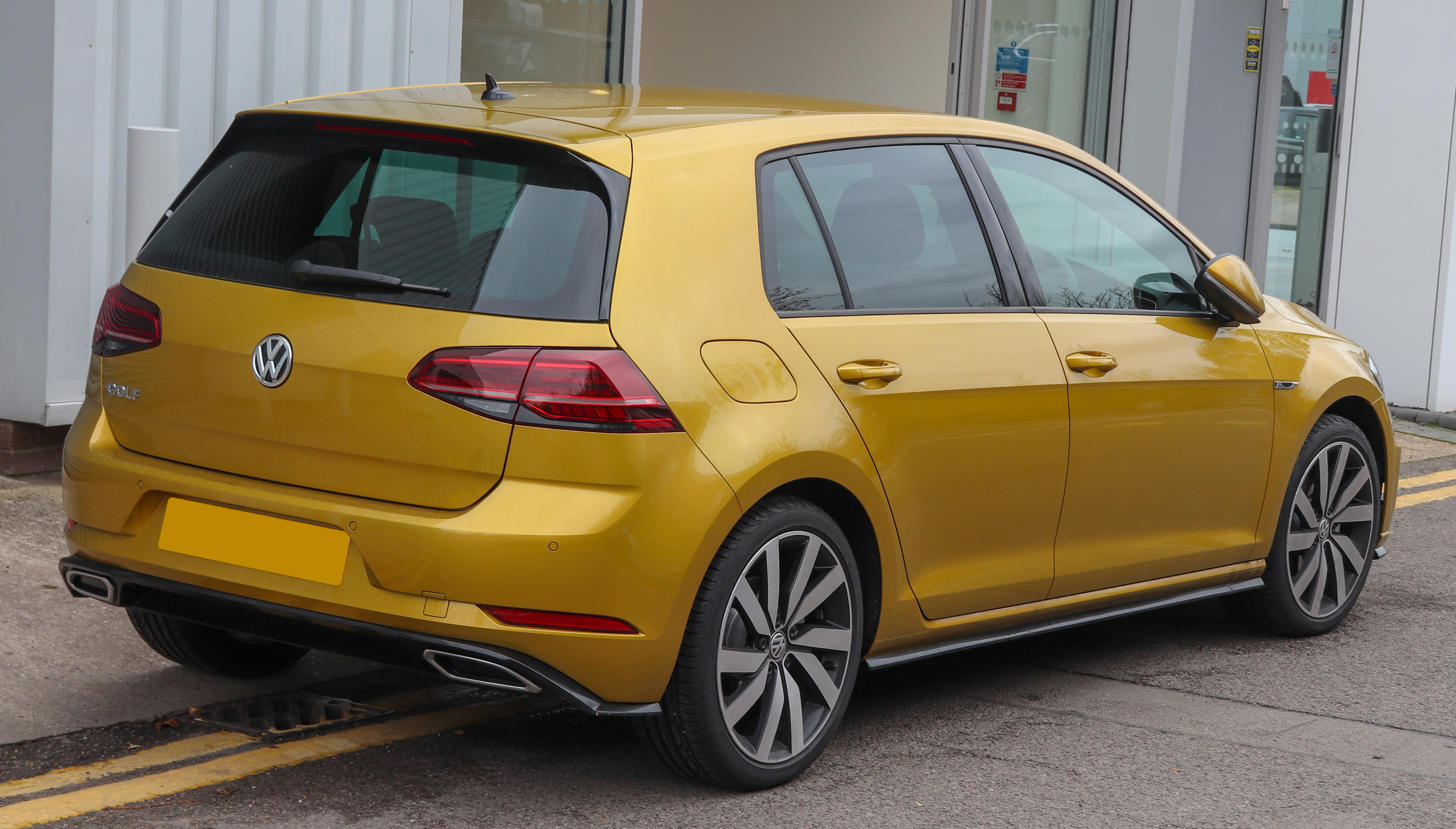
R-Line (facelift)

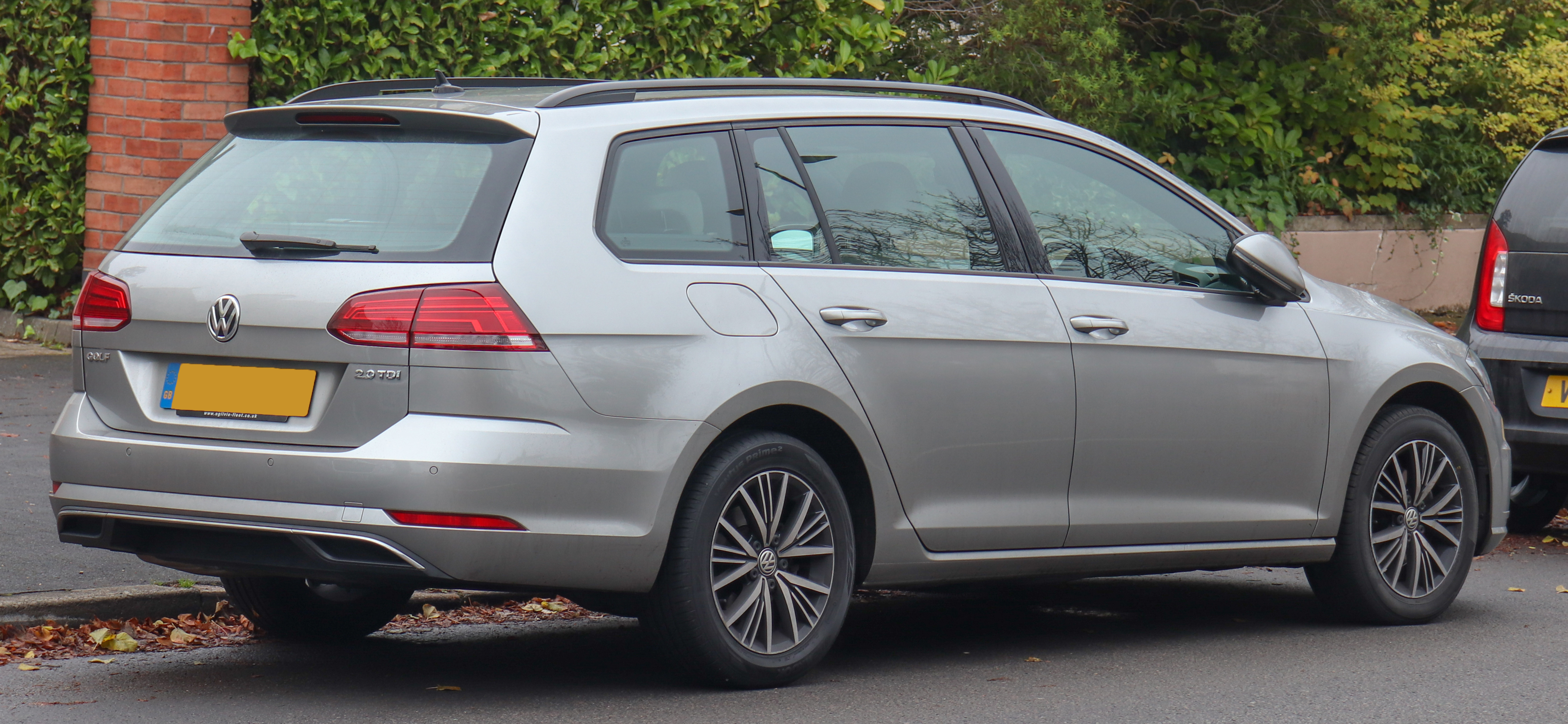
Golf Variant (facelift)

== Powertrain ==
The Golf line is available in all the relevant drive systems: the Golf TSI, including GTI, is petrol-powered; Golf TDI, including GTD, is diesel-powered; the Golf TGI is powered by compressed natural gas (CNG); the e-Golf is powered by electricity; and Golf GTE is a plug-in hybrid. The use of a modular transverse matrix assembly kit enables the manufacturing of Golf models with petrol, diesel, natural gas, electric and hybrid drives from bumper to bumper at Volkswagen factories. Retail deliveries of the e-Golf in Germany began in the second quarter of 2014. U.S. sales started in selected markets during the fourth quarter of 2014. The Golf GTE was launched also in the fourth quarter of 2014.

All internal combustion engines are three- or four-cylinder units:

Petrol engines
Model	Displacement	Power	Torque	Acceleration 0–100 km/h (0-62 mph)	Top speed	Transmission	Notes
1.2 TSI BlueMotion	1,197 cc (73 cu in)	85 PS (63 kW; 84 hp) at 4,300–5,300 rpm	160 N⋅m (118 lb⋅ft) at 1,400–3,500 rpm	11.9 s	179 km/h (111 mph)	5-speed manual	
1.2 TSI BlueMotion	1,197 cc (73 cu in)	105 PS (77 kW; 104 hp) at 5,000 rpm	175 N⋅m (129 lb⋅ft) at 1,550–4,100 rpm	10.2 s	192 km/h (119 mph)	6-speed manual 7-speed DSG	
1.0 TSI BlueMotion	999 cc (61 cu in)	115 PS (85 kW; 113 hp) at 5,000–5,500 rpm	200 N⋅m (148 lb⋅ft) at 2,000–3,500 rpm	9.7 s	204 km/h (127 mph)	6-speed manual 7-speed DSG	
1.4 TSI BlueMotion	1,390 cc (85 cu in)	122 PS (90 kW; 120 hp) at 5,000 rpm	200 N⋅m (148 lb⋅ft) at 1,400–4,000 rpm	9.3 s	203 km/h (126 mph)	6-speed manual 7-speed DSG	
1.4 TSI BlueMotion	1,390 cc (85 cu in)	125 PS (92 kW; 123 hp) at 5,000–6,000 rpm	200 N⋅m (148 lb⋅ft) at 1,400–4,000 rpm	9.1 s	204 km/h (127 mph)	6-speed manual 7-speed DSG	from April 2014
1.4 TSI BlueMotion	1,395 cc (85 cu in)	140 PS (103 kW; 138 hp) at 4,500–6,000 rpm	250 N⋅m (184 lb⋅ft) at 1,500–3,500 rpm	8.4 s	212 km/h (132 mph)	6-speed manual 7-speed DSG	
1.4 TSI BlueMotion	1,395 cc (85 cu in)	150 PS (110 kW; 148 hp) at 5,000–6,000 rpm	250 N⋅m (184 lb⋅ft) at 1,500–3,500 rpm	8.2 s	216 km/h (134 mph)	6-speed manual 7-speed DSG; 8-speed automatic (USA)	from April 2014 (MY2018 in USA)
1.5 TSI EVO	1,498 cc (91 cu in)	150 PS (110 kW; 148 hp) at 5,000–6,000 rpm	250 N⋅m (184 lb⋅ft) at 1,500–3,500 rpm	8.1 s	216 km/h (134 mph)	6-speed manual 7-speed DSG	
1.6	1,598 cc (98 cu in)	110 PS (81 kW; 108 hp) at 3050–4800 rpm	164 N⋅m (121 lb⋅ft) at 3400–4700 rpm	13.6 s	190 km/h (118 mph)	5-speed manual	Brazil, Chile, Colombia
1.8 TSI	1,798 cc (110 cu in)	172 PS (127 kW; 170 hp) at 4,800–6,200 rpm	270 N⋅m (199 lb⋅ft) at 1,600–4,200 rpm	7.6 s	209 km/h (130 mph)	5-speed manual 6-speed Tiptronic; 6-speed DSG (AWD only)	North America
GTE	1,395 cc (85 cu in)	GTE Hybrid mode—205 PS (151 kW; 202 hp) at 3,750–6,000 rpm Electric Motor—100 PS (74 kW; 99 hp); Petrol Motor—150 PS (110 kW; 148 hp)	350 N⋅m (258 lb⋅ft) at 1,500–4,000 rpm	7.6 s	222 km/h (138 mph)	6-speed DSG	EU
GTI (2013-2016)	1,984 cc (121 cu in)	220 PS (162 kW; 217 hp) at 4,500-6,200 rpm	350 N⋅m (258 lb⋅ft) at 1,500-4,400 rpm	6.3 s	246 km/h (153 mph)	6-speed manual 6-speed DSG	
GTI Performance Package (2013-2016)	1,984 cc (121 cu in)	230 PS (169 kW; 227 hp) at 4,700-6,200 rpm	350 N⋅m (258 lb⋅ft) at 1,500-4,600 rpm	6.2 s	250 km/h (155 mph)	6-speed manual 7-speed DSG	
GTI (2016-2020)	1,984 cc (121 cu in)	230 PS (169 kW; 227 hp) at 4,500-6,200 rpm	350 N⋅m (258 lb⋅ft) at 1,500-4,400 rpm	6.2 s	246 km/h (153 mph)	6-speed manual 6-speed DSG	
GTI Performance Package (2016-2020)	1,984 cc (121 cu in)	245 PS (180 kW; 242 hp) at 4,700-6,200 rpm	370 N⋅m (273 lb⋅ft) at 1,500-4,600 rpm	6.0 s	250 km/h (155 mph)	6-speed manual 7-speed DSG	
GTI Clubsport (2016)	1,984 cc (121 cu in)	265 PS (195 kW; 261 hp) at 5,350-6,600rpm	370 N⋅m (273 lb⋅ft) at 1,700-5,300rpm	5.9 s	250 km/h (155 mph)	6-speed manual 7-speed DSG	
GTI Clubsport S	1,984 cc (121 cu in)	310 PS (228 kW; 306 hp) at 4,700-6,200 rpm	385 N⋅m (284 lb⋅ft) at 1,500-4,600 rpm	5.7 s	250 km/h (155 mph)	6-speed manual 7-speed DSG	
GTI TCR (2019)	1,984 cc (121 cu in)	290 PS (213 kW; 286 hp) at 5,400-6,400 rpm	380 N⋅m (280 lb⋅ft) at 1,800-5,300 rpm	5.6 s	250 km/h (155 mph)	7-speed DSG	
R (2014-2016)	1,984 cc (121 cu in)	300 PS (221 kW; 296 hp) at 5,500-6,200 rpm	380 N⋅m (280 lb⋅ft) at 1,800-5,500 rpm	4.9 s	250 km/h (155 mph)	6-speed manual 6-speed DSG	CJXC
R (2016-2018)	1,984 cc (121 cu in)	310 PS (228 kW; 306 hp) at 5,500-6,200 rpm	380 N⋅m (280 lb⋅ft) at 1,800-5,500 rpm	4.9 s	250 km/h (155 mph)	6-speed manual 7-speed DSG	DJHA
R (2018-2020)	1,984 cc (121 cu in)	300 PS (221 kW; 296 hp) at 5,500-6,200 rpm	400 N⋅m (295 lb⋅ft) at 1,800-5,500 rpm	4.9 s	250 km/h (155 mph)	6-speed manual 7-speed DSG	DNUE
Diesel engines
Model	Displacement	Power	Torque	Acceleration 0–100 km/h (0-62 mph)	Top speed	Transmission	Notes
1.6 TDI BlueMotion (CLHB)	1,598 cc (98 cu in)	90 PS (66 kW; 89 hp) at 2750–4800 rpm	230 N⋅m (170 lb⋅ft) at 1400–2700 rpm	12.9 s	185 km/h (115 mph)	5-speed manual 7-speed DSG	Euro 5 / Euro 6 2015 on
1.6 TDI (CLHA)	1,598 cc (98 cu in)	105 PS (77 kW; 104 hp) at 3,000–4,000 rpm	250 N⋅m (184 lb⋅ft) at 1,500–2,750 rpm	10.7 s	192 km/h (119 mph)	5-speed manual 7-speed DSG	Euro 5 / Euro 6 2015 on
1.6 TDI BlueMotion (CRKB)	1,598 cc (98 cu in)	110 PS (81 kW; 108 hp) at 3,200–4,000 rpm	250 N⋅m (184 lb⋅ft) at 1,500–3000 rpm	10.5 s	192 km/h (119 mph)	6-speed manual	Euro 5 /Euro 6 2015 on
1.6 TDI (DDYA, DGTE)	1,598 cc (98 cu in)	115 PS (85 kW; 113 hp) at 3,000–4,000 rpm	250 N⋅m (184 lb⋅ft) at 1,500–3,200 rpm	10.2 s	198 km/h (123 mph)	5-speed manual 7-speed DSG	Euro 6d-TEMP 2017 on
2.0 TDI	1,968 cc (120 cu in)	150 PS (110 kW; 148 hp) at 4,400 rpm	320 N⋅m (236 lb⋅ft) at 1,750–3,000 rpm	8.6 s	216 km/h (134 mph)	6-speed manual 6-speed DSG	
2.0 TDI BlueMotion (CKFC)	1,968 cc (120 cu in)	150 PS (110 kW; 148 hp) at 3,500–4,000 rpm	340 N⋅m (251 lb⋅ft) at 1,750–3,000 rpm	8.6 s	216 km/h (134 mph)	6-speed manual 7-speed DSG	
GTD (CUNA / CUPA/ DGCA)	1,968 cc (120 cu in)	184 PS (135 kW; 181 hp) at 3,500–4,000 rpm	380 N⋅m (280 lb⋅ft) at 1,750–3,250 rpm	7.5 s	230 km/h (143 mph)	6-speed manual 6-speed DSG; 7-speed DSG	Euro 6
Electric motor
Model	Displacement	Power	Torque	Acceleration 0–100 km/h (0-62 mph)	Top speed	Transmission	Notes
e-GOLF (EAGA)	Electric Motor	136 PS (100 kW; 134 hp)	290 N⋅m (214 lb⋅ft)	9.6 s	150 km/h (93 mph)	Single-speed automatic	35.8 kWh battery
e-GOLF (EAGA)	Electric Motor	115 PS (85 kW; 113 hp)	270 N⋅m (199 lb⋅ft)	9.6 s	140 km/h (87 mph)	Single-speed automatic	24.2 kWh battery

== Awards ==
- Car and Driver's 10Best list in 2019
- 2015 North American Car of the Year
- 2015 Motor Trend Car of the Year
- 2013 European Car of the Year
- 2013 World Car of the Year
- 2013 Car of the Year Japan
- 2013–14 Japan's Import Car of the Year
- 2014 What Car?—Best Estate Car (Great Britain)
- 2013 Wheels Car of the Year (Australia)
- 2013 Cars Guide Car of the Year (Australia)

== Golf Sportsvan/SV ==
The Golf Sportsvan or Golf SV, is a five-door compact MPV which was designed and produced by the German automaker Volkswagen between 2014 and 2020. Previewed as the Volkswagen Sportsvan concept at the 2013 Frankfurt Motor Show and positioned below the seven-seater Touran in the company's product catalogue, it is derived from the Golf Mk7 and based on the MQB platform, and was also assembled at the Wolfsburg plant alongside the standard Golf hatchback. At 4,338 mm long, the new SV is 134 mm longer than the Golf Plus that it replaces, 83 mm longer than the Golf hatchback, and 224 mm shorter than the Golf Estate.

Preceded by Volkswagen Golf Mk6	Volkswagen Golf Mk7; 2012–2021	Succeeded by Volkswagen Golf Mk8
