= 2016 TCR International Series Imola round =

(Italy) 2016 TCR International Series Imola round
Round details
- Round 4 of 11 rounds in the 2016 TCR International Series
- Layout of the Autodromo Enzo e Dino Ferrari
- Location: Autodromo Enzo e Dino Ferrari, Imola, Italy
- Course: Permanent racing facility 4.909 km (3.050 mi)

TCR International Series

Race 1
- Date: 22 May 2016
- Laps: 14

Pole position
Driver	(Italy) Gianni Morbidelli	WestCoast Racing
- Time: 1:53.228

Podium
First	(Switzerland) Stefano Comini	Leopard Racing
Second	(Spain) Pepe Oriola	Team Craft-Bamboo Lukoil
Third	(Georgia (country)) Davit Kajaia	Liqui Moly Team Engstler

Fastest lap
Driver	(Spain) Pepe Oriola	Team Craft-Bamboo Lukoil
- Time: 1:54.575 (on lap 9)

Race 2
- Date: 22 May 2016
- Laps: 14

Podium
First	(Russia) Mikhail Grachev	WestCoast Racing
Second	(Slovakia) Maťo Homola	B3 Racing Team Hungary
Third	(Switzerland) Stefano Comini	Leopard Racing

Fastest lap
Driver	(Spain) Jordi Oriola	Target Competition
- Time: 1:54.582 (on lap 4)

The 2016 TCR International Series Imola round will be the fourth round of the 2016 TCR International Series season. It took place on 22 May at the Autodromo Enzo e Dino Ferrari.

Stefano Comini won the first race, starting from fourth position, driving a Volkswagen Golf GTI TCR, and Mikhail Grachev gained the second one, driving a Honda Civic TCR.

== Ballast ==
Due to the results obtained in the previous round, Aku Pellinen received +30 kg, Pepe Oriola +20 kg and Jean-Karl Vernay +10 kg. Nevertheless, Pellinen didn't take part at this event, so he would have taken the ballast at the first round he would have participated.

== Classification ==
=== Qualifying ===
Pos.	No.	Driver	Car	Team	Q1	Q2	Grid	Points
1	10	(Italy) Gianni Morbidelli	Honda Civic TCR	(Sweden) WestCoast Racing	1:53.270	1:53.228	1	5
2	74	(Spain) Pepe Oriola	SEAT León TCR	(United Kingdom) Team Craft-Bamboo Lukoil	1:53.828	1:53.285	2	4
3	7	(Georgia (country)) Davit Kajaia	Volkswagen Golf GTI TCR	(Germany) Liqui Moly Team Engstler	1:54.250	1:53.569	3	3
4	1	(Switzerland) Stefano Comini	Volkswagen Golf GTI TCR	(Luxembourg) Leopard Racing	1:53.992	1:53.738	4	2
5	8	(Russia) Mikhail Grachev	Honda Civic TCR	(Sweden) WestCoast Racing	1:53.763	1:53.855	5	1
6	70	(Slovakia) Maťo Homola	SEAT León TCR	B3 Racing Team Hungary	1:54.205	1:53.856	6	
7	40	(Switzerland) Alain Menu	Honda Civic TCR	(Sweden) WestCoast Racing	1:54.746	1:53.857	7	
8	77	(Russia) Sergey Afanasyev	SEAT León TCR	(United Kingdom) Team Craft-Bamboo Lukoil	1:54.358	1:54.004	8	
9	52	(Spain) Jordi Gené	Volkswagen Golf GTI TCR	(Germany) Liqui Moly Team Engstler	1:54.731	1:54.243	9	
10	9	(Hungary) Attila Tassi	SEAT León TCR	B3 Racing Team Hungary	1:54.498	1:54.258	10	
11	54	(United Kingdom) James Nash	SEAT León TCR	(United Kingdom) Team Craft-Bamboo Lukoil	1:54.724^{1}	1:54.436	11	
12	62	(Serbia) Dušan Borković	SEAT León TCR	B3 Racing Team Hungary	1:54.321	No time^{2}	12	
13	33	(Spain) Jordi Oriola	Honda Civic TCR	(Italy) Target Competition	1:54.828^{1}		13	
14	2	(France) Jean-Karl Vernay	Volkswagen Golf GTI TCR	(Luxembourg) Leopard Racing	1:55.121		14	
15	41	(Italy) Carlotta Fedeli	SEAT León Cup Racer	(Italy) B.D. Racing	1:56.961		15	
16	42	(Italy) Alessandra Neri	SEAT León Cup Racer	(Italy) B.D. Racing	1:58.402		16	

Notes

- ^1 — James Nash and Jordi Oriola's best lap time in Q1 were deleted for exceeding track limits.
- ^2 — Dušan Borković's best lap time in Q2 were deleted for exceeding track limits.

=== Race 1 ===
Pos.	No.	Driver	Car	Team	Laps	Time/Retired	Grid	Points
1	1	(Switzerland) Stefano Comini	Volkswagen Golf GTI TCR	(Luxembourg) Leopard Racing	14	28:11.944	4	25
2	74	(Spain) Pepe Oriola	SEAT León TCR	(United Kingdom) Team Craft-Bamboo Lukoil	14	+2.235	2	18
3	7	(Georgia (country)) Davit Kajaia	Volkswagen Golf GTI TCR	(Germany) Liqui Moly Team Engstler	14	+3.328	3	15
4	77	(Russia) Sergey Afanasyev	SEAT León TCR	(United Kingdom) Team Craft-Bamboo Lukoil	14	+10.570	8	12
5	70	(Slovakia) Maťo Homola	SEAT León TCR	B3 Racing Team Hungary	14	+15.423	6	10
6	52	(Spain) Jordi Gené	Volkswagen Golf GTI TCR	(Germany) Liqui Moly Team Engstler	14	+17.268	9	8
7	9	(Hungary) Attila Tassi	SEAT León TCR	B3 Racing Team Hungary	14	+18.700	10	6
8	8	(Russia) Mikhail Grachev	Honda Civic TCR	(Sweden) WestCoast Racing	14	+21.347	5	4
9	41	(Italy) Carlotta Fedeli	SEAT León Cup Racer	(Italy) B.D. Racing	14	+29.519	15	2
10	42	(Italy) Alessandra Neri	SEAT León Cup Racer	(Italy) B.D. Racing	14	+48.726	16	1
11	2	(France) Jean-Karl Vernay	Volkswagen Golf GTI TCR	(Luxembourg) Leopard Racing	14	+1:17.133^{3}	14	
12	62	(Serbia) Dušan Borković	SEAT León TCR	B3 Racing Team Hungary	11	Collision	12	
Ret	33	(Spain) Jordi Oriola	Honda Civic TCR	(Italy) Target Competition	7	Radiator	13	
Ret	54	(United Kingdom) James Nash	SEAT León TCR	(United Kingdom) Team Craft-Bamboo Lukoil	6	Electrical	11	
Ret	10	(Italy) Gianni Morbidelli	Honda Civic TCR	(Sweden) WestCoast Racing	4	Power steering	1	
Ret	40	(Switzerland) Alain Menu	Honda Civic TCR	(Sweden) WestCoast Racing	4	Collision	7	

Notes

- ^3 — Jean-Karl Vernay was given two 30-second penalties for causing a collision with Dušan Borković, as well as exceeding track limits repeatedly.

=== Race 2 ===
Pos.	No.	Driver	Car	Team	Laps	Time/Retired	Grid	Points
1	8	(Russia) Mikhail Grachev	Honda Civic TCR	(Sweden) WestCoast Racing	13	25:07.401	5	25
2	70	(Slovakia) Maťo Homola	SEAT León TCR	B3 Racing Team Hungary	13	+1.795	4	18
3	1	(Switzerland) Stefano Comini	Volkswagen Golf GTI TCR	(Luxembourg) Leopard Racing	13	+2.438	6	15
4	2	(France) Jean-Karl Vernay	Volkswagen Golf GTI TCR	(Luxembourg) Leopard Racing	13	+2.946	10	12
5	74	(Spain) Pepe Oriola	SEAT León TCR	(United Kingdom) Team Craft-Bamboo Lukoil	13	+3.807	8	10
6	52	(Spain) Jordi Gené	Volkswagen Golf GTI TCR	(Germany) Liqui Moly Team Engstler	13	+8.698	2	8
7	9	(Hungary) Attila Tassi	SEAT León TCR	B3 Racing Team Hungary	13	+11.521	1	6
8	7	(Georgia (country)) Davit Kajaia	Volkswagen Golf GTI TCR	(Germany) Liqui Moly Team Engstler	13	+11.789	7	4
9	33	(Spain) Jordi Oriola	Honda Civic TCR	(Italy) Target Competition	13	+12.807	16	2
10	40	(Switzerland) Alain Menu	Honda Civic TCR	(Sweden) WestCoast Racing	13	+13.380	15	1
11	41	(Italy) Carlotta Fedeli	SEAT León Cup Racer	(Italy) B.D. Racing	13	+33.045	11	
12	42	(Italy) Alessandra Neri	SEAT León Cup Racer	(Italy) B.D. Racing	13	+41.073	12	
Ret	10	(Italy) Gianni Morbidelli	Honda Civic TCR	(Sweden) WestCoast Racing	1	Brakes	13	
Ret	77	(Russia) Sergey Afanasyev	SEAT León TCR	(United Kingdom) Team Craft-Bamboo Lukoil	0	Driveshaft	3	
DNS	54	(United Kingdom) James Nash	SEAT León TCR	(United Kingdom) Team Craft-Bamboo Lukoil		Electrical	14	
DNS	62	(Serbia) Dušan Borković	SEAT León TCR	B3 Racing Team Hungary		Collision	9	

== Standings after the event ==
Drivers' Championship standings

	Pos	Driver	Points
	1	(Spain) Pepe Oriola	116
3	2	(Switzerland) Stefano Comini	101
	3	(Italy) Gianni Morbidelli	85
2	4	(United Kingdom) James Nash	82
3	5	(Slovakia) Maťo Homola	77

Model of the Year standings

	Pos	Car	Points
	1	SEAT León	286
1	2	Volkswagen Golf GTI TCR	240
1	3	Honda Civic TCR	220
	4	Peugeot 308 Racing Cup	20
	5	Opel Astra TCR	19

Teams' Championship standings

Pos	Driver	Points
1	(United Kingdom) Team Craft-Bamboo Lukoil	239
2	(Sweden) WestCoast Racing	193
3	(Luxembourg) Leopard Racing	175
4	B3 Racing Team Hungary	144
5	(Germany) Liqui Moly Team Engstler	74

- Note: Only the top five positions are included for both sets of drivers' standings.
