= 2016 TCR International Series Estoril round =

Part of the TCR International Series season

(Portugal) 2016 TCR International Series Estoril round
Round details
- Round 2 of 11 rounds in the 2016 TCR International Series
- Layout of the Autódromo do Estoril
- Location: Autódromo do Estoril, Estoril, Portugal
- Course: Permanent racing facility 4.182 km (2.599 mi)

TCR International Series

Race 1
- Date: 24 April 2016
- Laps: 15

Pole position
Driver	(Slovakia) Maťo Homola	B3 Racing Team Hungary
- Time: 1:48.518

Podium
First	(Italy) Gianni Morbidelli	WestCoast Racing
Second	(France) Jean-Karl Vernay	Leopard Racing
Third	(Switzerland) Stefano Comini	Leopard Racing

Fastest lap
Driver	(Slovakia) Maťo Homola	B3 Racing Team Hungary
- Time: 1:49.276 (on lap 4)

Race 2
- Date: 24 April 2016
- Laps: 15

Podium
First	(United Kingdom) James Nash	Team Craft-Bamboo Lukoil
Second	(Switzerland) Stefano Comini	Leopard Racing
Third	(Italy) Gianni Morbidelli	WestCoast Racing

Fastest lap
Driver	(Italy) Gianni Morbidelli	WestCoast Racing
- Time: 1:49.095 (on lap 5)

The 2016 TCR International Series Estoril round was the second round of the 2016 TCR International Series season. It took place on 24 April at the Autódromo do Estoril.

Gianni Morbidelli won the first race, starting from second position, driving a Honda Civic TCR, and James Nash gained the second one, driving a SEAT León TCR.

== Ballast ==
Due to the results obtained in the previous round, Pepe Oriola received +30 kg, James Nash +20 kg and Dušan Borković +10 kg.

In addition, the Balance of Performance was reviewed for this round: Volkswagen Golf GTI TCRs received a -30 kg bonus, while Opel Astra TCRs and Alfa Romeo Giulietta TCRs were given a -20 kg bonus.

== Classification ==
=== Qualifying ===
Pos.	No.	Driver	Car	Team	Q1	Q2	Grid	Points
1	70	(Slovakia) Maťo Homola	SEAT León TCR	B3 Racing Team Hungary	1:49.479	1:48.518	1	5
2	10	(Italy) Gianni Morbidelli	Honda Civic TCR	(Sweden) WestCoast Racing	1:49.508	1:48.673	2	4
3	2	(France) Jean-Karl Vernay	Volkswagen Golf GTI TCR	(Luxembourg) Leopard Racing	1:49.424	1:48.860	3	3
4	1	(Switzerland) Stefano Comini	Volkswagen Golf GTI TCR	(Luxembourg) Leopard Racing	1:49.711	1:48.965	4	2
5	77	(Spain) Sergey Afanasyev	SEAT León TCR	(United Kingdom) Team Craft-Bamboo Lukoil	1:49.913	1:49.012	5	1
6	14	(Finland) Aku Pellinen	Honda Civic TCR	(Sweden) WestCoast Racing	1:50.000	1:49.051	6	
7	74	(Spain) Pepe Oriola	SEAT León TCR	(United Kingdom) Team Craft-Bamboo Lukoil	1:49.231	1:49.085	7	
8	24	(United States) Kevin Gleason	Honda Civic TCR	(Sweden) WestCoast Racing	1:49.938	1:49.173	8	
9	54	(United Kingdom) James Nash	SEAT León TCR	(United Kingdom) Team Craft-Bamboo Lukoil	1:49.773	1:49.188	9	
10	50	(Netherlands) Loris Hezemans	SEAT León TCR	(Spain) Baporo Motorsport	1:50.008	1:49.868	10	
11	9	(Hungary) Attila Tassi	SEAT León TCR	B3 Racing Team Hungary	1:50.165	1:50.176	11	
12	7	(Georgia (country)) Davit Kajaia	Volkswagen Golf GTI TCR	(Germany) Liqui Moly Team Engstler	1:50.132	1:50.457	12	
13	8	(Russia) Mikhail Grachev	Volkswagen Golf GTI TCR	(Germany) Liqui Moly Team Engstler	1:50.421		13	
14	26	(Portugal) Francisco Mora	SEAT León Cup Racer	(Spain) Baporo Motorsport	1:50.653		14	
15	88	(Italy) Michela Cerruti	Alfa Romeo Giulietta TCR	(Italy) Mulsanne Racing	1:51.727		15	
16	31	(Italy) Luca Rangoni	Subaru Impreza STi TCR	(Italy) Top Run Motorsport	1:52.083		16	
17	62	(Serbia) Dušan Borković	SEAT León TCR	B3 Racing Team Hungary	4:07.881		17^{1}	

Notes

- ^1 — Dušan Borković was moved to the back of the grid for having not set a time within the 107% limit.

=== Race 1 ===
Pos.	No.	Driver	Car	Team	Laps	Time/Retired	Grid	Points
1	10	(Italy) Gianni Morbidelli	Honda Civic TCR	(Sweden) WestCoast Racing	15	27:53.287	2	25
2	2	(France) Jean-Karl Vernay	Volkswagen Golf GTI TCR	(Luxembourg) Leopard Racing	15	+1.026	3	18
3	1	(Switzerland) Stefano Comini	Volkswagen Golf GTI TCR	(Luxembourg) Leopard Racing	15	+4.113	4	15
4	70	(Slovakia) Maťo Homola	SEAT León TCR	B3 Racing Team Hungary	15	+5.463	1	12
5	77	(Russia) Sergey Afanasyev	SEAT León TCR	(United Kingdom) Team Craft-Bamboo Lukoil	15	+5.841	5	10
6	54	(United Kingdom) James Nash	SEAT León TCR	(United Kingdom) Team Craft-Bamboo Lukoil	15	+7.513	9	8
7	14	(Finland) Aku Pellinen	Honda Civic TCR	(Sweden) WestCoast Racing	15	+14.651	6	6
8	74	(Spain) Pepe Oriola	SEAT León TCR	(United Kingdom) Team Craft-Bamboo Lukoil	15	+20.515	7	4
9	50	(Netherlands) Loris Hezemans	SEAT León TCR	(Spain) Baporo Motorsport	15	+20.716	10	2
10	26	(Portugal) Francisco Mora	SEAT León Cup Racer	(Spain) Baporo Motorsport	15	+21.078	14	1
11	8	(Russia) Mikhail Grachev	Volkswagen Golf GTI TCR	(Germany) Liqui Moly Team Engstler	15	+23.111	13	
12	62	(Serbia) Dušan Borković	SEAT León TCR	B3 Racing Team Hungary	15	+23.273	17	
13	7	(Georgia (country)) Davit Kajaia	Volkswagen Golf GTI TCR	(Germany) Liqui Moly Team Engstler	15	+24.555	12	
14	9	(Hungary) Attila Tassi	SEAT León TCR	B3 Racing Team Hungary	15	+29.758	11	
15	88	(Italy) Michela Cerruti	Alfa Romeo Giulietta TCR	(Italy) Mulsanne Racing	12	+3 laps	15	
Ret	31	(Italy) Luca Rangoni	Subaru Impreza STi TCR	(Italy) Top Run Motorsport	4	Suspension	16	
Ret	24	(United States) Kevin Gleason	Honda Civic TCR	(Sweden) WestCoast Racing	1	Engine	8	

=== Race 2 ===
Pos.	No.	Driver	Car	Team	Laps	Time/Retired	Grid	Points
1	54	(United Kingdom) James Nash	SEAT León TCR	(United Kingdom) Team Craft-Bamboo Lukoil	15	27:46.901	2	25
2	1	(Switzerland) Stefano Comini	Volkswagen Golf GTI TCR	(Luxembourg) Leopard Racing	15	+2.252	6	18
3	10	(Italy) Gianni Morbidelli	Honda Civic TCR	(Sweden) WestCoast Racing	15	+7.241	8	15
4	77	(Russia) Sergey Afanasyev	SEAT León TCR	(United Kingdom) Team Craft-Bamboo Lukoil	15	+9.592	5	12
5	2	(France) Jean-Karl Vernay	Volkswagen Golf GTI TCR	(Luxembourg) Leopard Racing	15	+11.622	7	10
6	14	(Finland) Aku Pellinen	Honda Civic TCR	(Sweden) WestCoast Racing	15	+16.759	4	8
7	7	(Georgia (country)) Davit Kajaia	Volkswagen Golf GTI TCR	(Germany) Liqui Moly Team Engstler	15	+19.190	11	6
8	70	(Slovakia) Maťo Homola	SEAT León TCR	B3 Racing Team Hungary	15	+20.927	9	4
9	26	(Portugal) Francisco Mora	SEAT León Cup Racer	(Spain) Baporo Motorsport	15	+21.259	13	2
10	74	(Spain) Pepe Oriola	SEAT León TCR	(United Kingdom) Team Craft-Bamboo Lukoil	15	+32.535	3	1
11	8	(Russia) Mikhail Grachev	Volkswagen Golf GTI TCR	(Germany) Liqui Moly Team Engstler	15	+33.182	12	
12	24	(United States) Kevin Gleason	Honda Civic TCR	(Sweden) WestCoast Racing	15	+33.811	16^{2}	
13	9	(Hungary) Attila Tassi	SEAT León TCR	B3 Racing Team Hungary	15	+36.801	10	
14	88	(Italy) Michela Cerruti	Alfa Romeo Giulietta TCR	(Italy) Mulsanne Racing	15	+39.109	14	
Ret	31	(Italy) Luca Rangoni	Subaru Impreza STi TCR	(Italy) Top Run Motorsport	11	Accident	17^{2}	
Ret	62	(Serbia) Dušan Borković	SEAT León TCR	B3 Racing Team Hungary	4	Radiator	15	
Ret	50	(Netherlands) Loris Hezemans	SEAT León TCR	(Spain) Baporo Motorsport	0	Collision	1	

Notes

- ^2 — Kevin Gleason and Luca Rangoni were moved to the back of the grid because of a parc fermé infringement.

== Standings after the event ==
Drivers' Championship standings

	Pos	Driver	Points
4	1	(Italy) Gianni Morbidelli	70
	2	(United Kingdom) James Nash	69
2	3	(Spain) Pepe Oriola	56
	4	(Russia) Sergey Afanasyev	50
4	5	(Switzerland) Stefano Comini	41

Model of the Year standings

	Pos	Car	Points
	1	SEAT León	157
	2	Honda Civic TCR	111
	3	Volkswagen Golf GTI TCR	104
	4	Opel Astra TCR	19
1	5	Alfa Romeo Giulietta TCR	14

Teams' Championship standings

	Pos	Driver	Points
	1	(United Kingdom) Team Craft-Bamboo Lukoil	147
	2	(Sweden) WestCoast Racing	101
3	3	(Luxembourg) Leopard Racing	74
1	4	B3 Racing Team Hungary	56
1	5	(Germany) Liqui Moly Team Engstler	26

- Note: Only the top five positions are included for both sets of drivers' standings.
