= 2016 TCR International Series Sakhir round =

(Bahrain) 2016 TCR International Series Sakhir round
Round details
- Round 1 of 11 rounds in the 2016 TCR International Series
- Layout of the Bahrain International Circuit
- Location: Bahrain International Circuit, Sakhir, Bahrain
- Course: Permanent racing facility 5.412 km (3.363 mi)

TCR International Series

Race 1
- Date: 2 April 2016
- Laps: 10

Pole position
Driver	(Russia) Sergey Afanasyev	Team Craft-Bamboo Lukoil
- Time: 2:12.541

Podium
First	(Spain) Pepe Oriola	Team Craft-Bamboo Lukoil
Second	(Italy) Gianni Morbidelli	WestCoast Racing
Third	(United Kingdom) James Nash	Team Craft-Bamboo Lukoil

Fastest lap
Driver	(Italy) Gianni Morbidelli	WestCoast Racing
- Time: 2:12.602 (on lap 4)

Race 2
- Date: 3 April 2016
- Laps: 10

Podium
First	(Spain) Pepe Oriola	Team Craft-Bamboo Lukoil
Second	(United Kingdom) James Nash	Team Craft-Bamboo Lukoil
Third	(Serbia) Dušan Borković	B3 Racing Team Hungary

Fastest lap
Driver	(Spain) Pepe Oriola	Team Craft-Bamboo Lukoil
- Time: 2:13.511 (on lap 2)

The 2016 TCR International Series Sakhir round was the first round of the 2016 TCR International Series season. It took place on 2–3 April at the Bahrain International Circuit.

Pepe Oriola won both races, driving a SEAT León TCR.

== Ballast ==
After the Valencia testing session, the Balance of Performance was issued: SEAT León TCRs, Honda Civic TCRs and Volkswagen Golf GTI TCRs were given a +30 kg from the minimum weight of 1285 kg, while Subaru Impreza STi TCR received a -20 kg bonus. No changes for Opel Astra TCRs, Alfa Romeo Giulietta TCRs and SEAT León Cup Racers.

== Classification ==
=== Qualifying ===
Pos.	No.	Driver	Car	Team	Q1	Q2	Grid	Points
1	77	(Russia) Sergey Afanasyev	SEAT León TCR	(United Kingdom) Team Craft-Bamboo Lukoil	2:13.714	2:12.541	1	5
2	62	(Serbia) Dušan Borković	SEAT León TCR	B3 Racing Team Hungary	2:13.107	2:12.642	2	4
3	54	(United Kingdom) James Nash	SEAT León TCR	(United Kingdom) Team Craft-Bamboo Lukoil	2:13.464	2:12.650	3	3
4	10	(Italy) Gianni Morbidelli	Honda Civic TCR	(Sweden) WestCoast Racing	2:13.432	2:12.652	4	2
5	74	(Spain) Pepe Oriola	SEAT León TCR	(United Kingdom) Team Craft-Bamboo Lukoil	2:13.592	2:12.663	5	1
6	14	(Finland) Aku Pellinen	Honda Civic TCR	(Sweden) WestCoast Racing	2:13.650	2:12.718	6	
7	70	(Slovakia) Maťo Homola	SEAT León TCR	B3 Racing Team Hungary	2:13.693	2:13.029	7	
8	24	(United States) Kevin Gleason	Honda Civic TCR	(Sweden) WestCoast Racing	2:14.391	2:13.097	8	
9	2	(France) Jean-Karl Vernay	Volkswagen Golf GTI TCR	(Luxembourg) Leopard Racing	2:14.238	2:13.155^{1}	9	
10	7	(Georgia (country)) Davit Kajaia	Volkswagen Golf GTI TCR	(Germany) Liqui Moly Team Engstler	2:14.178	2:13.824	10	
11	1	(Switzerland) Stefano Comini	Volkswagen Golf GTI TCR	(Luxembourg) Leopard Racing	2:14.965	2:14.050^{1}	11	
12	33	(Spain) Jordi Oriola	Opel Astra TCR	(Italy) Target Competition	2:15.288	2.14.985	12	
13	23	(Italy) Andrea Belicchi	Opel Astra TCR	(Italy) Target Competition	2:15.481		13	
14	8	(Russia) Mikhail Grachev	Volkswagen Golf GTI TCR	(Germany) Liqui Moly Team Engstler	2:15.639		14	
15	88	(Italy) Michela Cerruti	Alfa Romeo Giulietta TCR	(Italy) Mulsanne Racing	2:15.889		15	
16	32	(Italy) Luigi Ferrara	Subaru Impreza STi TCR	(Italy) Top Run Motorsport	2:16.297		16	
17	78	(Bahrain) Salman Al Khalifa	SEAT León Cup Racer	(Netherlands) Bas Koeten Racing	2:16.596		17	
18	79	(Bahrain) Hussain Karimi	SEAT León Cup Racer	(Netherlands) Bas Koeten Racing	2:18.651		18	
19	9	(Hungary) Attila Tassi	SEAT León TCR	B3 Racing Team Hungary	no time		19	

Notes

- ^1 — Jean-Karl Vernay and Stefano Comini's best lap times were deleted for exceeding track limits.

=== Race 1 ===
Pos.	No.	Driver	Car	Team	Laps	Time/Retired	Grid	Points
1	74	(Spain) Pepe Oriola	SEAT León TCR	(United Kingdom) Team Craft-Bamboo Lukoil	10	22:25.883	5	25
2	10	(Italy) Gianni Morbidelli	Honda Civic TCR	(Sweden) WestCoast Racing	10	+2.372	4	18
3	54	(United Kingdom) James Nash	SEAT León TCR	(United Kingdom) Team Craft-Bamboo Lukoil	10	+3.219	3	15
4	77	(Russia) Sergey Afanasyev	SEAT León TCR	(United Kingdom) Team Craft-Bamboo Lukoil	10	+4.995	1	12
5	14	(Finland) Aku Pellinen	Honda Civic TCR	(Sweden) WestCoast Racing	10	+9.902	6	10
6	62	(Serbia) Dušan Borković	SEAT León TCR	B3 Racing Team Hungary	10	+9.919	2	8
7	1	(Switzerland) Stefano Comini	Volkswagen Golf GTI TCR	(Luxembourg) Leopard Racing	10	+20.087	11	6
8	70	(Slovakia) Maťo Homola	SEAT León TCR	B3 Racing Team Hungary	10	+23.319	7	4
9	7	(Georgia (country)) Davit Kajaia	Volkswagen Golf GTI TCR	(Germany) Liqui Moly Team Engstler	10	+23.364	10	2
10	8	(Russia) Mikhail Grachev	Volkswagen Golf GTI TCR	(Germany) Liqui Moly Team Engstler	10	+24.555	14	1
11	33	(Spain) Jordi Oriola	Opel Astra TCR	(Italy) Target Competition	10	+27.750	12	
12	32	(Italy) Luigi Ferrara	Subaru Impreza STi TCR	(Italy) Top Run Motorsport	10	+29.889	16	
13	88	(Italy) Michela Cerruti	Alfa Romeo Giulietta TCR	(Italy) Mulsanne Racing	10	+35.392	15	
14	23	(Italy) Andrea Belicchi	Opel Astra TCR	(Italy) Target Competition	10	+45.761	13	
15	78	(Bahrain) Salman Al Khalifa	SEAT León Cup Racer	(Netherlands) Bas Koeten Racing	10	+54.024	17	
16	79	(Bahrain) Hussain Karimi	SEAT León Cup Racer	(Netherlands) Bas Koeten Racing	10	+1:17.967	18	
Ret	2	(France) Jean-Karl Vernay	Volkswagen Golf GTI TCR	(Luxembourg) Leopard Racing	3	Collision	9	
Ret	24	(United States) Kevin Gleason	Honda Civic TCR	(Sweden) WestCoast Racing	3	Collision	8	
DNS	9	(Hungary) Attila Tassi	SEAT León TCR	B3 Racing Team Hungary		Accident	19	

=== Race 2 ===
Pos.	No.	Driver	Car	Team	Laps	Time/Retired	Grid	Points
1	74	(Spain) Pepe Oriola	SEAT León TCR	(United Kingdom) Team Craft-Bamboo Lukoil	10	22:36.458	6	25
2	54	(United Kingdom) James Nash	SEAT León TCR	(United Kingdom) Team Craft-Bamboo Lukoil	10	+1.572	8	18
3	62	(Serbia) Dušan Borković	SEAT León TCR	B3 Racing Team Hungary	10	+6.463	9	15
4	7	(Georgia (country)) Davit Kajaia	Volkswagen Golf GTI TCR	(Germany) Liqui Moly Team Engstler	10	+10.265	1	12
5	77	(Russia) Sergey Afanasyev	SEAT León TCR	(United Kingdom) Team Craft-Bamboo Lukoil	10	+15.063	10	10
6	33	(Spain) Jordi Oriola	Opel Astra TCR	(Italy) Target Competition	10	+23.461	12	8
7	10	(Italy) Gianni Morbidelli	Honda Civic TCR	(Sweden) WestCoast Racing	10	+23.617	7	6
8	32	(Italy) Luigi Ferrara	Subaru Impreza STi TCR	(Italy) Top Run Motorsport	10	+24.851	16	4
9	78	(Bahrain) Salman Al Khalifa	SEAT León Cup Racer	(Netherlands) Bas Koeten Racing	10	+31.718	17	2
10	14	(Finland) Aku Pellinen	Honda Civic TCR	(Sweden) WestCoast Racing	10	+34.372^{2}	5	1
11	70	(Slovakia) Maťo Homola	SEAT León TCR	B3 Racing Team Hungary	10	+42.848^{2}	4	
12	79	(Bahrain) Hussain Karimi	SEAT León Cup Racer	(Netherlands) Bas Koeten Racing	10	+54.796	18	
13	24	(United States) Kevin Gleason	Honda Civic TCR	(Sweden) WestCoast Racing	9	Collision	3	
14	8	(Russia) Mikhail Grachev	Volkswagen Golf GTI TCR	(Germany) Liqui Moly Team Engstler	9	+1 lap	14	
Ret	88	(Italy) Michela Cerruti	Alfa Romeo Giulietta TCR	(Italy) Mulsanne Racing	6	Driveshaft	15	
Ret	1	(Switzerland) Stefano Comini	Volkswagen Golf GTI TCR	(Luxembourg) Leopard Racing	1	Collision	11	
Ret	23	(Italy) Andrea Belicchi	Opel Astra TCR	(Italy) Target Competition	1	Technical	13	
DSQ	2	(France) Jean-Karl Vernay	Volkswagen Golf GTI TCR	(Luxembourg) Leopard Racing	7	Retired	2	
DNS	9	(Hungary) Attila Tassi	SEAT León TCR	B3 Racing Team Hungary		Accident	19	

Notes

- ^2 — Aku Pellinen and Maťo Homola were given a 30-second penalty for jumping the start.

== Standings after the event ==
Drivers' Championship standings

Pos	Driver	Points
1	(Spain) Pepe Oriola	51
2	(United Kingdom) James Nash	36
3	(Serbia) Dušan Borković	27
4	(Russia) Sergey Afanasyev	27
5	(Italy) Gianni Morbidelli	26

Model of the Year standings

Pos	Car	Points
1	SEAT León	92
2	Honda Civic TCR	51
3	Volkswagen Golf GTI TCR	38
4	Opel Astra TCR	19
5	Subaru Impreza STi TCR	12

Teams' Championship standings

Pos	Driver	Points
1	(United Kingdom) Team Craft-Bamboo Lukoil	91
2	(Sweden) WestCoast Racing	43
3	B3 Racing Team Hungary	35
4	(Germany) Liqui Moly Team Engstler	18
5	(Italy) Target Competition	11

- Note: Only the top five positions are included for both sets of drivers' standings.
