= 2016 ADAC TCR Germany Touring Car Championship =

Car racing series

The 2016 ADAC TCR Germany Touring Car Championship was the first season of touring car racing to be run by the German-based sanctioning body ADAC to newly created TCR regulations. The series ran predominantly in ADAC's home nation Germany. As a support category to the ADAC GT Masters series, the championship also took in races in the neighbouring nations of Austria and the Netherlands.

== Teams and drivers ==
Hankook is the official tyre supplier.

Team	Car	No.	Drivers	Class	Rounds
(Germany) Liqui Moly Team Engstler	Volkswagen Golf GTI TCR	3	(Poland) Gosia Rdest		7
(Germany) Liqui Moly Team Engstler	Volkswagen Golf GTI TCR	4	(Germany) Niklas Mackschin		4–6
(Germany) Liqui Moly Team Engstler	Volkswagen Golf GTI TCR	5	(Switzerland) Daniel Conrad	J	1–2
(Germany) Liqui Moly Team Engstler	SEAT León Cup Racer	7	(Germany) Mike Halder		All
(Germany) Junior Team Engstler	Volkswagen Golf GTI TCR	6	(Germany) Tim Zimmermann		1–4, 6–7
(Germany) Junior Team Engstler	Volkswagen Golf GTI TCR	8	(Germany) Tom Lautenschlager	J	All
(Finland) LMS Racing	SEAT León Cup Racer (Note: The team used SEAT León TCR for Antti Buri since round at Spielberg.)	10	(Finland) Antti Buri		All
(Finland) LMS Racing	SEAT León Cup Racer	67	(Finland) Kari-Pekka Laaksonen		2
(Finland) LMS Racing	SEAT León Cup Racer	68	(Finland) Niko Kankkunen	J	4–6
(Finland) LMS Racing	SEAT León Cup Racer	69	(Finland) Emil Westman		7
(Italy) Target Competition	SEAT León Cup Racer (Note: The team used Honda Civic TCR for Jürgen Schmarl and Josh Files since round at Oschersleben.)	11	(Austria) Jürgen Schmarl		1–5, 7
(Italy) Target Competition	SEAT León Cup Racer	99	(United Kingdom) Josh Files		All
(Italy) Target Junior Team	SEAT León TCR	44	(Portugal) Francisco Mora		5
(Italy) Target Junior Team	SEAT León TCR	45	(Sweden) Simon Larsson	J	6–7
(Italy) Target Junior Team	Honda Civic TCR (Note: The team used SEAT León Cup Racer for Mike Beckhusen for the first two rounds of the season.)	55	(Italy) Andrea Belicchi		4
(Italy) Target Junior Team	Honda Civic TCR	59	(Germany) Mike Beckhusen	J	1–3
(Germany) Racing One	Volkswagen Golf GTI TCR	13	(Germany) Benjamin Leuchter		All
(Switzerland) TOPCAR Sport	SEAT León TCR	66	(Switzerland) Ronny Jost		All
(Germany) JBR Motorsport	Volkswagen Golf GTI TCR	18	(Germany) Kai Jordan		All
(Austria) HP Racing	SEAT León Cup Racer	22	(Austria) Harald Proczyk		All
(Germany) Steibel Motorsport	SEAT León Cup Racer	28	(Switzerland) Pascal Eberle		All
(Netherlands) Bas Koeten Racing	SEAT León Cup Racer	34	(Netherlands) Bas Schouten		1–6
(Germany) Honda Team ADAC	Honda Civic TCR	41	(Germany) Steve Kirsch		All
(Germany) Honda Team ADAC	Honda Civic TCR	88	(Germany) Dominik Fugel	J	All
SEAT Austria	SEAT León Cup Racer	61	(Austria) Mario Dablander		1–5
(Germany) ALL-INKL.COM Münnich Motorsport	Honda Civic TCR	77	(Germany) René Münnich		2
Entries ineligible to score points
(Germany) Carpek Racing	SEAT León Cup Racer	15	(Germany) Carol Wittke		7
(Switzerland) TOPCAR Sport	SEAT León TCR	16	(Switzerland) Hans Schori		7
(Switzerland) TOPCAR Sport	SEAT León TCR	33	(Switzerland) Yves Meyer		7
(Switzerland) TOPCAR Sport	SEAT León TCR	65	(Switzerland) Jörg Schori		7
(Germany) Lubner Motorsport	Opel Astra TCR	17	(Switzerland) Jasmin Preisig		5, 7
(Germany) Lubner Motorsport	Opel Astra TCR	59	(Germany) Mike Beckhusen		7
(Belgium) Milo Racing	Volkswagen Golf GTI TCR	20	(Belgium) Vincent Radermecker		5
(Italy) Target Junior Team	Honda Civic TCR	21	(Sweden) Dennis Strandberg		7
(Belgium) DG Sport Compétition	Opel Astra TCR	23	(Belgium) Pierre-Yves Corthals		5, 7
(Belgium) DG Sport Compétition	Opel Astra TCR	24	(Spain) Jordi Oriola		5, 7
(Austria) HP Racing	SEAT León Cup Racer	42	(Austria) Lukas Niedertscheider		7
(United Kingdom) VFR Racing	Honda Civic TCR	80	(United Kingdom) Finlay Crocker		4, 6

== Calendar and results ==
The 2016 schedule was announced on 13 November 2015, with two events scheduled to be held outside Germany. The second Oschersleben round supported the International Series along with ADAC Formula 4, while the rest of the rounds were part of the ADAC GT Masters weekends.

Rnd.		Circuit	Date	Pole position	Fastest lap	Winning driver	Winning team	Supporting
1	1	(Germany) Motorsport Arena Oschersleben, Oschersleben	16 April	(Germany) Steve Kirsch	(Germany) Benjamin Leuchter	(United Kingdom) Josh Files	(Italy) Target Competition	ADAC GT Masters; ADAC Formula 4 Championship; Deutscher Tourenwagen Cup
1	2	(Germany) Motorsport Arena Oschersleben, Oschersleben	17 April		(Germany) Benjamin Leuchter	(United Kingdom) Josh Files	(Italy) Target Competition	ADAC GT Masters; ADAC Formula 4 Championship; Deutscher Tourenwagen Cup
2	3	(Germany) Sachsenring, Hohenstein-Ernstthal	30 April	(Austria) Harald Proczyk	(Austria) Harald Proczyk	(Austria) Harald Proczyk	(Austria) HP Racing	ADAC GT Masters; ADAC Formula 4 Championship; Deutscher Tourenwagen Cup
2	4	(Germany) Sachsenring, Hohenstein-Ernstthal	1 May		(Finland) Antti Buri	(Finland) Antti Buri	(Finland) LMS Racing	ADAC GT Masters; ADAC Formula 4 Championship; Deutscher Tourenwagen Cup
3	5	(Germany) Motorsport Arena Oschersleben, Oschersleben	19 June	(United Kingdom) Josh Files	(United Kingdom) Josh Files	(Germany) Dominik Fugel	(Germany) Honda Team ADAC	TCR International Series; ADAC Formula 4 Championship
3	6	(Germany) Motorsport Arena Oschersleben, Oschersleben	19 June		(Germany) Mike Beckhusen	(United Kingdom) Josh Files	(Italy) Target Competition	TCR International Series; ADAC Formula 4 Championship
4	7	(Austria) Red Bull Ring, Spielberg	23 July	(United Kingdom) Josh Files	(Italy) Andrea Belicchi	(United Kingdom) Josh Files	(Italy) Target Competition	ADAC GT Masters; ADAC Formula 4 Championship; Deutscher Tourenwagen Cup
4	8	(Austria) Red Bull Ring, Spielberg	24 July		(Italy) Andrea Belicchi	(Germany) Steve Kirsch	(Germany) Honda Team ADAC	ADAC GT Masters; ADAC Formula 4 Championship; Deutscher Tourenwagen Cup
5	9	(Germany) Nürburgring, Nürburg	6 August	(Austria) Jürgen Schmarl	(Spain) Jordi Oriola	(United Kingdom) Josh Files	(Italy) Target Competition	TCR Trophy Europe; ADAC GT Masters; ADAC Formula 4 Championship; Deutscher Tourenwagen Cup
5	10	(Germany) Nürburgring, Nürburg	7 August		(Finland) Antti Buri	(Finland) Antti Buri	(Finland) LMS Racing	TCR Trophy Europe; ADAC GT Masters; ADAC Formula 4 Championship; Deutscher Tourenwagen Cup
6	11	(Netherlands) Circuit Park Zandvoort, Zandvoort	20 August	(United Kingdom) Josh Files	(Germany) Tim Zimmermann	(Finland) Antti Buri	(Finland) LMS Racing	ADAC GT Masters; ADAC Formula 4 Championship
6	12	(Netherlands) Circuit Park Zandvoort, Zandvoort	21 August		(Austria) Harald Proczyk	(Austria) Harald Proczyk	(Austria) HP Racing	ADAC GT Masters; ADAC Formula 4 Championship
7	13	(Germany) Hockenheimring, Hockenheim	1 October	(United Kingdom) Josh Files	(United Kingdom) Josh Files	(United Kingdom) Josh Files	(Italy) Target Competition	TCR Trophy Europe; ADAC GT Masters; ADAC Formula 4 Championship; Formula Renault 2.0 NEC
7	14	(Germany) Hockenheimring, Hockenheim	2 October		(Sweden) Dennis Strandberg	(Germany) Steve Kirsch	(Germany) Honda Team ADAC	TCR Trophy Europe; ADAC GT Masters; ADAC Formula 4 Championship; Formula Renault 2.0 NEC

== Championship standings ==
=== Scoring system ===
These points have been based on the FIA's points system used in the FIA Formula One Championship.

Position	**1st**	**2nd**	**3rd**	**4th**	**5th**	**6th**	**7th**	**8th**	**9th**	**10th**
Points	25	18	15	12	10	8	6	4	2	1

=== Drivers' Championship ===
Pos.	Driver	OSC (Germany)		SAC (Germany)		OSC (Germany)		RBR (Austria)		NÜR (Germany)		ZAN‡ (Netherlands)		HOC (Germany)		Pts.
Pos.	Driver	RD1	RD2	RD1	RD2	RD1	RD2	RD1	RD2	RD1	RD2	RD1	RD2	RD1	RD2	Pts.
1	(United Kingdom) Josh Files	1^{5}	1	Ret^{2}	6	**9**^{1}	1	1^{2}	Ret	1^{3}	3	2^{1}	5	**1**^{1}	Ret	222
2	(Austria) Harald Proczyk	4	2	**1**^{1}	5	5	5	5	2	19	14	3	1	Ret^{4}	4	168,5
3	(Germany) Steve Kirsch	**8**^{1}	7	3^{3}	4	3^{4}	9	**Ret**^{1}	1	Ret^{5}	4	5^{3}	Ret	3^{3}	1	163
4	(Finland) Antti Buri	6	**9**	DSQ^{5}	1	12	6	Ret	**3**	14	1	1	2	6	Ret	128,5
5	(Germany) Benjamin Leuchter	2^{2}	4	7	2	8	14	6	15	6	5	8^{5}	7	5	Ret	116
6	(Germany) Mike Halder	7	5	4	17	2	4	8	12	8	2	6^{4}	3	11	Ret	111
7	(Netherlands) Bas Schouten	5	6	5	8	4	2	10	8	7	16	EX	DNS			77
8	(Germany) Tim Zimmermann	Ret^{3}	DNS	2^{4}	3	Ret	3	9	DSQ			4	4	Ret	Ret	73
9	(Switzerland) Pascal Eberle	3^{4}	Ret	6	Ret	7	Ret	Ret	7	5	10	10	13	10	10	63
10	(Austria) Jürgen Schmarl	10	3	Ret	9	11^{3}	8	4^{4}	10	**10**^{1}	8			16	9	60
11	(Germany) Dominik Fugel	12	12	13	14	1	**13**	3^{3}	Ret	Ret	15	14^{2}	Ret	8	11	57
12	(Switzerland) Ronny Jost	11	8	9	10	6	7	7	6	16	DNS	9	11	14	3	55
13	(Austria) Mario Dablander	9	10	12	7	Ret^{2}	11	11	4	4^{6}	6					52
14	(Germany) Tom Lautenschlager	14	Ret	11	12	10	10	13	5	9	11	14	9	7	Ret	31
15	(Germany) Kai Jordan	13	14	8	11	Ret	Ret	12	9	17	Ret	15	10	9^{6}	5	26
16	(Italy) Andrea Belicchi							2^{5}	13							20
17	(Finland) Emil Westman													13	7	11
18	(Germany) Niklas Mackschin							14	11	11	12	12	6			10
19	(Poland) Gosia Rdest													19	8	8
20	(Portugal) Francisco Mora									15^{4}	9					7
21	(Finland) Niko Kankkunen							16	14	18	EX	11	8			4,5
22	(Germany) Mike Beckhusen	Ret	11	10	13	13^{5}	12									2
23	(Sweden) Simon Larsson											16	Ret	15^{5}	Ret	2
24	(Switzerland) Daniel Conrad	15	13	15	18											0
25	(Finland) Kari-Pekka Laaksonen			14	15											0
26	(Germany) René Münnich			16	**16**											0
Drivers ineligible to score points
	(Sweden) Dennis Strandberg													2^{2}	2	0
	(Spain) Jordi Oriola									2^{2}	Ret			WD	WD	0
	(Belgium) Pierre-Yves Corthals									3	Ret			4	Ret	0
	(Austria) Lukas Niedertscheider													12	6	0
	(United Kingdom) Finlay Crocker							15	Ret			7	12			0
	(Belgium) Vincent Radermecker									12	7					0
	(Switzerland) Jasmin Preisig									13	13			18	12	0
	(Germany) Mike Beckhusen													23	13	0
	(Switzerland) Yves Meyer													17	14	0
	(Switzerland) Jörg Schori													20	15	0
	(Germany) Сarol Wittke													21	16	0
	(Switzerland) Hans Schori													22	17	0
Pos.	Driver	OSC (Germany)		SAC (Germany)		OSC (Germany)		RBR (Austria)		NÜR (Germany)		ZAN‡ (Netherlands)		HOC (Germany)		Pts.

Colour	Result
Gold	Winner
Silver	Second place
Bronze	Third place
Green	Points classification
Blue	Non-points classification
Blue	Non-classified finish (NC)
Purple	Retired, not classified (Ret)
Red	Did not qualify (DNQ)
Red	Did not pre-qualify (DNPQ)
Black	Disqualified (DSQ)
White	Did not start (DNS)
White	Withdrew (WD)
White	Race cancelled (C)
Blank	Did not practice (DNP)
Blank	Did not arrive (DNA)
Blank	Excluded (EX)

**Bold** – Pole
Italics – Fastest Lap

† – Drivers did not finish the race, but were classified as they completed over 75% of the race distance.
‡ – Half points were awarded in Race 1 at Circuit Park Zandvoort as less than 75% of the scheduled distance was completed due to Bas Schouten deliberately blocking the Pit Lane exit after a start crash to force the Red Flag. After the Red Flag was shown, the restart would come only moments later, but there was not enough time to complete enough laps.

=== Junior class ===
Pos.	Driver	OSC (Germany)		SAC (Germany)		OSC (Germany)		RBR (Austria)		NÜR (Germany)		ZAN (Netherlands)		HOC (Germany)		Pts.
Pos.	Driver	RD1	RD2	RD1	RD2	RD1	RD2	RD1	RD2	RD1	RD2	RD1	RD2	RD1	RD2	Pts.
1	(Germany) Tom Lautenschlager	14	Ret	11	12	10	10	13	5	9	11	17	9	7	Ret	255
2	(Germany) Dominik Fugel	12	12	13	14	1	**13**	3^{3}	Ret	Ret	15	14^{2}	Ret	8	11	217
3	(Finland) Niko Kankkunen							16	14	18	EX	11	8			101
4	(Germany) Mike Beckhusen	Ret	11	10	13	13^{5}	12									101
5	(Switzerland) Daniel Conrad	15	13	15	18											54
Pos.	Driver	OSC (Germany)		SAC (Germany)		OSC (Germany)		RBR (Austria)		NÜR (Germany)		ZAN (Netherlands)		HOC (Germany)		Pts.

=== Teams' Championship ===
Pos.	Driver	OSC (Germany)		SAC (Germany)		OSC (Germany)		RBR (Austria)		NÜR (Germany)		ZAN (Netherlands)		HOC (Germany)		Pts.
Pos.	Driver	RD1	RD2	RD1	RD2	RD1	RD2	RD1	RD2	RD1	RD2	RD1	RD2	RD1	RD2	Pts.
1	(Italy) Target Competition 1	1^{5}	1	Ret^{2}	6	9^{1}	1	1^{2}	10	1^{1}	3	2^{1}	5	1^{1}	9	232
2	(Germany) Honda Team ADAC	8^{1}	7	3^{3}	4	1^{4}	9	3^{1}	1	Ret^{3}	4	5^{2}	Ret	3^{2}	1	195
3	(Austria) HP Racing	4	2	1^{1}	5	5	5	5	2	19	14	3	1	Ret^{3}	4	175,5
4	(Finland) LMS Racing	6	9	14^{5}	1	12	8	16	3	14	1	1^{4}	2	6	7	145,5
5	(Germany) Racing One	2^{2}	4	7	2	8	14	6^{5}	15	6	5^{5}	8	7	3	Ret	126
6	(Germany) Liqui Moly Team Engstler	7	5	4	17	2	4	8	11	8	2	6^{3}	3	11	8	126
7	(Germany) Junior Team Engstler	14^{3}	Ret	2^{4}	3	10	3	9	5	9	11	4^{5}	4	7	Ret	109
8	(Netherlands) Bas Koeten Racing	5	6	5	8	4	2	10	8	7	16	EX	DNS			83
9	(Czech Republic) Steibel Motorsport	3^{4}	Ret	6	Ret	7	Ret	Ret	7	5	7	10	13	10	10	71
10	(Germany) TOPCAR Sport	11	8	9	10	6	7	7	6	16	DNS	9	11	14	3	70
11	(Austria) Wolf-Power Racing	9	10	12	7	Ret^{2}	11	11	4	4^{4}	6					57
12	(Italy) Target Competition 2	Ret	11	10	13	13^{5}	12	2^{5}	13	15^{2}	9	16	Ret	15^{4}	Ret	41
13	(Germany) JBR Motorsport	13	14	8	11	Ret	Ret	12	9	17	Ret	15	10	9^{5}	5	34,5
	(Germany) ALL-INKL.COM Münnich Motorsport			16	16											0
Team ineligible to score points
	(Italy) Target Competition													2	2	0
	(Belgium) DG Sport Compétition									2	Ret			4	Ret	0
	(Austria) HP Racing													12	6	0
	(Belgium) Milo Racing									12	7					0
	(United Kingdom) VFR Racing							15	Ret			7	12			0
	(Germany) Lubner Motorsport									13	13			18	12	0
	(Germany) TOPCAR Sport													20	14	0
	(Germany) Carpek Racing													21	16	0
Pos.	Driver	OSC (Germany)		SAC (Germany)		OSC (Germany)		RBR (Austria)		NÜR (Germany)		ZAN (Netherlands)		HOC (Germany)		Pts.
