= 2016 TCR International Series Salzburgring round =

(Austria) 2016 TCR International Series Salzburgring round
Round details
- Round 5 of 11 rounds in the 2016 TCR International Series
- Layout of the Salzburgring
- Location: Salzburgring, Salzburg, Austria
- Course: Permanent racing facility 4.230 km (2.630 mi)

TCR International Series

Race 1
- Date: 5 June 2016
- Laps: 17

Pole position
Driver	(Austria) Harald Proczyk	WestCoast Racing
- Time: 1:38.767

Podium
First	(Russia) Mikhail Grachev	WestCoast Racing
Second	(United Kingdom) James Nash	Team Craft-Bamboo Lukoil
Third	(Slovakia) Maťo Homola	B3 Racing Team Hungary

Fastest lap
Driver	(United Kingdom) James Nash	Team Craft-Bamboo Lukoil
- Time: 1:26.787 (on lap 4)

Race 2
- Date: 5 June 2016
- Laps: 17

Podium
First	(France) Jean-Karl Vernay	Leopard Racing
Second	(Russia) Sergey Afanasyev	Team Craft-Bamboo Lukoil
Third	(Switzerland) Stefano Comini	Leopard Racing

Fastest lap
Driver	(France) Jean-Karl Vernay	Leopard Racing
- Time: 1:36.507 (on lap 13)

The 2016 TCR International Series Salzburgring round was the fifth round of the 2016 TCR International Series season. It took place on 4–5 June at the Salzburgring.

Mikhail Grachev won the first race, starting from ninth position, driving a Honda Civic TCR, and Jean-Karl Vernay gained the second one, driving a Volkswagen Golf GTI TCR.

== Ballast ==
Due to the results obtained in the previous round, Stefano Comini received +30 kg, Pepe Oriola +20 kg and Mikhail Grachev +10 kg.

In addition, the Balance of Performance was reviewed for this round: the Honda Civic TCR and SEAT León TCR's both received a -10 kg bonus.

== Classification ==
=== Qualifying ===
Pos.	No.	Driver	Car	Team	Q1	Q2	Grid	Points
1	43	(Austria) Harald Proczyk	Honda Civic TCR	(Sweden) WestCoast Racing	1:27.935	1:38.767	3^{1}	5
2	2	(France) Jean-Karl Vernay	Volkswagen Golf GTI TCR	(Luxembourg) Leopard Racing	1:27.532	1:39.079	1	4
3	74	(Spain) Pepe Oriola	SEAT León TCR	(United Kingdom) Team Craft-Bamboo Lukoil	1:26.769	1:39.359	2	3
4	10	(Italy) Gianni Morbidelli	Honda Civic TCR	(Sweden) WestCoast Racing	1:26.938	1:39.964	6^{1}	2
5	33	(Spain) Jordi Oriola	Honda Civic TCR	(Italy) Target Competition	1:27.130	1:40.064	4	1
6	62	(Serbia) Dušan Borković	SEAT León TCR	B3 Racing Team Hungary	1:27.121	1:40.214	5	
7	77	(Russia) Sergey Afanasyev	SEAT León TCR	(United Kingdom) Team Craft-Bamboo Lukoil	1:24.094	1:40.230	7	
8	22	(Czech Republic) Petr Fulín	Alfa Romeo Giulietta TCR	(Italy) Mulsanne Racing	1:27.736	1:40.487	8	
9	8	(Russia) Mikhail Grachev	Honda Civic TCR	(Sweden) WestCoast Racing	1:27.361	1:40.639	9	
10	9	(Hungary) Attila Tassi	SEAT León TCR	B3 Racing Team Hungary	1:26.683	1:40.788	10	
11	70	(Slovakia) Maťo Homola	SEAT León TCR	B3 Racing Team Hungary	1:28.437	1:41.846	11	
12	45	(Austria) Florian Janits	Volkswagen Golf GTI TCR	(Germany) Liqui Moly Team Engstler	1:29.174	1:44.241	12	
13	1	(Switzerland) Stefano Comini	Volkswagen Golf GTI TCR	(Luxembourg) Leopard Racing	1:40.284		13^{2}	
14	7	(Georgia (country)) Davit Kajaia	Volkswagen Golf GTI TCR	(Germany) Liqui Moly Team Engstler	No time		14^{2}	
15	54	(United Kingdom) James Nash	SEAT León TCR	(United Kingdom) Team Craft-Bamboo Lukoil	No time		15^{2}	
16	88	(Italy) Michela Cerruti	Alfa Romeo Giulietta TCR	(Italy) Mulsanne Racing	No time		16^{2}	

Notes

- ^1 — Harald Proczyk and Gianni Morbidelli was given a two-place grid penalty each, for having parked their cars in the fast lane during the red flag stoppage of qualifying.
- ^2 — Stefano Comini, Davit Kajaia, James Nash and Michela Cerruti were moved to the back of the grid for having not set a time within the 107% limit.

=== Race 1 ===
Pos.	No.	Driver	Car	Team	Laps	Time/Retired	Grid	Points
1	8	(Russia) Mikhail Grachev	Honda Civic TCR	(Sweden) WestCoast Racing	17	27:40.614	9	25
2	54	(United Kingdom) James Nash	SEAT León TCR	(United Kingdom) Team Craft-Bamboo Lukoil	17	+1.420	15	18
3	70	(Slovakia) Maťo Homola	SEAT León TCR	B3 Racing Team Hungary	17	+1.627	11	15
4	10	(Italy) Gianni Morbidelli	Honda Civic TCR	(Sweden) WestCoast Racing	17	+2.304	6	12
5	2	(France) Jean-Karl Vernay	Volkswagen Golf GTI TCR	(Luxembourg) Leopard Racing	17	+8.244	1	10
6	9	(Hungary) Attila Tassi	SEAT León TCR	B3 Racing Team Hungary	17	+10.746	10	8
7	7	(Georgia (country)) Davit Kajaia	Volkswagen Golf GTI TCR	(Germany) Liqui Moly Team Engstler	17	+11.305	14	6
8	1	(Switzerland) Stefano Comini	Volkswagen Golf GTI TCR	(Luxembourg) Leopard Racing	17	+12.387	13	4
9	45	(Austria) Florian Janits	Volkswagen Golf GTI TCR	(Germany) Liqui Moly Team Engstler	17	+12.864	12	2
10	88	(Italy) Michela Cerruti	Alfa Romeo Giulietta TCR	(Italy) Mulsanne Racing	17	+28.268	16	1
11	62	(Serbia) Dušan Borković	SEAT León TCR	B3 Racing Team Hungary	16	Collision	5	
12	74	(Spain) Pepe Oriola	SEAT León TCR	(United Kingdom) Team Craft-Bamboo Lukoil	15	Engine	2	
Ret	33	(Spain) Jordi Oriola	Honda Civic TCR	(Italy) Target Competition	8	Technical	4	
Ret	77	(Russia) Sergey Afanasyev	SEAT León TCR	(United Kingdom) Team Craft-Bamboo Lukoil	2	Puncture	7	
Ret	43	(Austria) Harald Proczyk	Honda Civic TCR	(Sweden) WestCoast Racing	2	Collision	3	
Ret	22	(Czech Republic) Petr Fulín	Alfa Romeo Giulietta TCR	(Italy) Mulsanne Racing	1	Collision	8	

=== Race 2 ===
Pos.	No.	Driver	Car	Team	Laps	Time/Retired	Grid	Points
1	2	(France) Jean-Karl Vernay	Volkswagen Golf GTI TCR	(Luxembourg) Leopard Racing	17	30:51.124	7	25
2	77	(Russia) Sergey Afanasyev	SEAT León TCR	(United Kingdom) Team Craft-Bamboo Lukoil	17	+0.955	15	18
3	1	(Switzerland) Stefano Comini	Volkswagen Golf GTI TCR	(Luxembourg) Leopard Racing	17	+2.065	11	15
4	54	(United Kingdom) James Nash	SEAT León TCR	(United Kingdom) Team Craft-Bamboo Lukoil	17	+5.698	13	12
5	70	(Slovakia) Maťo Homola	SEAT León TCR	B3 Racing Team Hungary	17	+7.889	9	10
6	10	(Italy) Gianni Morbidelli	Honda Civic TCR	(Sweden) WestCoast Racing	17	+8.297	5	8
7	33	(Spain) Jordi Oriola	Honda Civic TCR	(Italy) Target Competition	17	+9.392	4	6
8	9	(Hungary) Attila Tassi	SEAT León TCR	B3 Racing Team Hungary	17	+16.390	1	4
9	8	(Russia) Mikhail Grachev	Honda Civic TCR	(Sweden) WestCoast Racing	17	+16.846	2	2
10	45	(Austria) Florian Janits	Volkswagen Golf GTI TCR	(Germany) Liqui Moly Team Engstler	17	+31.036	10	1
Ret	7	(Georgia (country)) Davit Kajaia	Volkswagen Golf GTI TCR	(Germany) Liqui Moly Team Engstler	7	Accident	12	
Ret	43	(Austria) Harald Proczyk	Honda Civic TCR	(Sweden) WestCoast Racing	5	Technical	8	
DSQ	88	(Italy) Michela Cerruti	Alfa Romeo Giulietta TCR	(Italy) Mulsanne Racing	5	Retired	14	
DNS	62	(Serbia) Dušan Borković	SEAT León TCR	B3 Racing Team Hungary		Collision	16	
DNS	74	(Spain) Pepe Oriola	SEAT León TCR	(United Kingdom) Team Craft-Bamboo Lukoil		Engine	6	
DNS	22	(Czech Republic) Petr Fulín	Alfa Romeo Giulietta TCR	(Italy) Mulsanne Racing		Collision	3	

== Standings after the event ==
Drivers' Championship standings

	Pos	Driver	Points
1	1	(Switzerland) Stefano Comini	120
1	2	(Spain) Pepe Oriola	119
1	3	(United Kingdom) James Nash	112
2	4	(France) Jean-Karl Vernay	107
2	5	(Italy) Gianni Morbidelli	105

Model of the Year standings

	Pos	Car	Points
	1	SEAT León	353
	2	Volkswagen Golf GTI TCR	312
	3	Honda Civic TCR	269
	4	Peugeot 308 Racing Cup	24
1	5	Alfa Romeo Giulietta TCR	20

Teams' Championship standings

Pos	Driver	Points
1	(United Kingdom) Team Craft-Bamboo Lukoil	290
2	(Sweden) WestCoast Racing	247
3	(Luxembourg) Leopard Racing	233
4	B3 Racing Team Hungary	181
5	(Germany) Liqui Moly Team Engstler	83

- Note: Only the top five positions are included for both sets of drivers' standings.
