= 2016 TCR International Series Spa-Francorchamps round =

(Belgium) 2016 TCR International Series Spa-Francorchamps round
Round details
- Round 3 of 11 rounds in the 2016 TCR International Series
- Layout of the Circuit de Spa-Francorchamps
- Location: Circuit de Spa-Francorchamps, Francorchamps, Belgium
- Course: Permanent racing facility 7.004 km (4.352 mi)

TCR International Series

Race 1
- Date: 6 May 2016
- Laps: 9

Pole position
Driver	(Serbia) Dušan Borković	B3 Racing Team Hungary
- Time: 2:33.065

Podium
First	(Finland) Aku Pellinen	WestCoast Racing
Second	(Spain) Pepe Oriola	Team Craft-Bamboo Lukoil
Third	(Serbia) Dušan Borković	B3 Racing Team Hungary

Fastest lap
Driver	(France) Jean-Karl Vernay	Leopard Racing
- Time: 2:33.702 (on lap 3)

Race 2
- Date: 7 May 2016
- Laps: 9

Podium
First	(France) Jean-Karl Vernay	Leopard Racing
Second	(Switzerland) Stefano Comini	Leopard Racing
Third	(Finland) Antti Buri	Leopard Racing

Fastest lap
Driver	(France) Jean-Karl Vernay	Leopard Racing
- Time: 2:33.945 (on lap 5)

The 2016 TCR International Series Spa-Francorchamps round was the third round of the 2016 TCR International Series season. It took place on 6–7 May at the Circuit de Spa-Francorchamps.

Aku Pellinen won the first race, starting from third position, driving a Honda Civic TCR, and Jean-Karl Vernay gained the second one, driving a Volkswagen Golf GTI TCR.

== Ballast ==
Due to the results obtained in the previous round, Gianni Morbidelli received +30 kg, Stefano Comini +20 kg and James Nash +10 kg.

== Classification ==
=== Qualifying ===
Pos.	No.	Driver	Car	Team	Q1	Q2	Grid	Points
1	62	(Serbia) Dušan Borković	SEAT León TCR	B3 Racing Team Hungary	2:34.525^{1}	2:33.065	1	5
2	74	(Spain) Pepe Oriola	SEAT León TCR	(United Kingdom) Team Craft-Bamboo Lukoil	2:34.308	2:33.306	2	4
3	14	(Finland) Aku Pellinen	Honda Civic TCR	(Sweden) WestCoast Racing	2:34.893^{1}	2:33.432	3	3
4	77	(Russia) Sergey Afanasyev	SEAT León TCR	(United Kingdom) Team Craft-Bamboo Lukoil	2:35.232	2:33.530	4	2
5	54	(United Kingdom) James Nash	SEAT León TCR	(United Kingdom) Team Craft-Bamboo Lukoil	2:34.925	2:33.805	5	1
6	70	(Slovakia) Maťo Homola	SEAT León TCR	B3 Racing Team Hungary	2:34.783	2:33.870^{2}	6	
7	9	(Hungary) Attila Tassi	SEAT León TCR	B3 Racing Team Hungary	2:34.608	2:33.896	7	
8	1	(Switzerland) Stefano Comini	Volkswagen Golf GTI TCR	(Luxembourg) Leopard Racing	2:35.206	2:34.061	8	
9	2	(France) Jean-Karl Vernay	Volkswagen Golf GTI TCR	(Luxembourg) Leopard Racing	2:35.257^{3}	2:34.190^{2}	9	
10	48	(Finland) Antti Buri	Volkswagen Golf GTI TCR	(Luxembourg) Leopard Racing	2:35.338	2:34.273	10	
11	49	(Belgium) Pierre-Yves Corthals	SEAT León Cup Racer	(Netherlands) Ferry Monster Autosport	2:35.425	2:34.764	11	
12	30	(France) Jimmy Clairet	Peugeot 308 Racing Cup	(France) Sébastien Loeb Racing	2:35.530	2:35.502	12	
13	24	(United States) Kevin Gleason	Honda Civic TCR	(Sweden) WestCoast Racing	2:35.714		13	
14	7	(Georgia (country)) Davit Kajaia	Volkswagen Golf GTI TCR	(Germany) Liqui Moly Team Engstler	2:35.731		14	
15	10	(Italy) Gianni Morbidelli	Honda Civic TCR	(Sweden) WestCoast Racing	2:35.789		15	
16	50	(Netherlands) Loris Hezemans	SEAT León TCR	(Netherlands) Ferry Monster Autosport	2:36.136		16	
17	8	(Russia) Mikhail Grachev	Volkswagen Golf GTI TCR	(Germany) Liqui Moly Team Engstler	2:36.410^{3}		17	
18	38	(France) Grégory Guilvert	Peugeot 308 Racing Cup	(France) Sébastien Loeb Racing	2:37.765^{1}		17	

Notes

- ^1 — Dušan Borković, Aku Pellinen and Grégory Guilvert's best lap time in Q1 were deleted for exceeding track limits.
- ^2 — Maťo Homola and Jean-Karl Vernay's best lap time in Q2 were deleted for exceeding track limits.
- ^3 — Jean-Karl Vernay and Mikhail Grachev's best lap time in Q1 were deleted for exceeding track limits repeatedly.

=== Race 1 ===
Pos.	No.	Driver	Car	Team	Laps	Time/Retired	Grid	Points
1	14	(Finland) Aku Pellinen	Honda Civic TCR	(Sweden) WestCoast Racing	9	23:19.800	3	25
2	74	(Spain) Pepe Oriola	SEAT León TCR	(United Kingdom) Team Craft-Bamboo Lukoil	9	+0.376	2	18
3	62	(Serbia) Dušan Borković	SEAT León TCR	B3 Racing Team Hungary	9	+1.294	1	15
4	70	(Slovakia) Maťo Homola	SEAT León TCR	B3 Racing Team Hungary	9	+5.476	6	12
5	10	(Italy) Gianni Morbidelli	Honda Civic TCR	(Sweden) WestCoast Racing	9	+6.724	15	10
6	24	(United States) Kevin Gleason	Honda Civic TCR	(Sweden) WestCoast Racing	9	+7.208	13	8
7	7	(Georgia (country)) Davit Kajaia	Volkswagen Golf GTI TCR	(Germany) Liqui Moly Team Engstler	9	+9.669	14	6
8	54	(United Kingdom) James Nash	SEAT León TCR	(United Kingdom) Team Craft-Bamboo Lukoil	9	+16.593	5	4
9	77	(Russia) Sergey Afanasyev	SEAT León TCR	(United Kingdom) Team Craft-Bamboo Lukoil	9	+17.076	4	2
10	48	(Finland) Antti Buri	Volkswagen Golf GTI TCR	(Luxembourg) Leopard Racing	9	+17.734	10	1
11	8	(Russia) Mikhail Grachev	Volkswagen Golf GTI TCR	(Germany) Liqui Moly Team Engstler	9	+21.975	18^{4}	
12	38	(France) Grégory Guilvert	Peugeot 308 Racing Cup	(France) Sébastien Loeb Racing	9	+22.707	17	
13	30	(France) Jimmy Clairet	Peugeot 308 Racing Cup	(France) Sébastien Loeb Racing	9	+25.880	12	
14	2	(France) Jean-Karl Vernay	Volkswagen Golf GTI TCR	(Luxembourg) Leopard Racing	9	+34.596^{5}	9	
15	50	(Netherlands) Loris Hezemans	SEAT León TCR	(Netherlands) Ferry Monster Autosport	9	+44.782	16	
16	9	(Hungary) Attila Tassi	SEAT León TCR	B3 Racing Team Hungary	8	Accident	7	
Ret	49	(Belgium) Pierre-Yves Corthals	SEAT León Cup Racer	(Netherlands) Ferry Monster Autosport	5	Retired	11	
Ret	1	(Switzerland) Stefano Comini	Volkswagen Golf GTI TCR	(Luxembourg) Leopard Racing	1	Retired	8	

Notes

- ^4 — Mikhail Grachev was given a three-place grid penalty for exceeding track limits repeatedly during the Qualifying session.
- ^5 — Jean-Karl Vernay was given a 30-second penalty for causing a collision with James Nash.

=== Race 2 ===
Pos.	No.	Driver	Car	Team	Laps	Time/Retired	Grid	Points
1	2	(France) Jean-Karl Vernay	Volkswagen Golf GTI TCR	(Luxembourg) Leopard Racing	9	23:15.816	2	25
2	1	(Switzerland) Stefano Comini	Volkswagen Golf GTI TCR	(Luxembourg) Leopard Racing	9	+2.262	3	18
3	48	(Finland) Antti Buri	Volkswagen Golf GTI TCR	(Luxembourg) Leopard Racing	9	+4.584	1	15
4	70	(Slovakia) Maťo Homola	SEAT León TCR	B3 Racing Team Hungary	9	+6.791	5	12
5	14	(Finland) Aku Pellinen	Honda Civic TCR	(Sweden) WestCoast Racing	9	+7.728	8	10
6	54	(United Kingdom) James Nash	SEAT León TCR	(United Kingdom) Team Craft-Bamboo Lukoil	9	+11.555	6	8
7	74	(Spain) Pepe Oriola	SEAT León TCR	(United Kingdom) Team Craft-Bamboo Lukoil	9	+12.326	9	6
8	24	(United States) Kevin Gleason	Honda Civic TCR	(Sweden) WestCoast Racing	9	+13.032	13	4
9	77	(Russia) Sergey Afanasyev	SEAT León TCR	(United Kingdom) Team Craft-Bamboo Lukoil	9	+13.356	7	2
10	49	(Belgium) Pierre-Yves Corthals	SEAT León Cup Racer	(Netherlands) Ferry Monster Autosport	9	+18.534	11	1
11	50	(Netherlands) Loris Hezemans	SEAT León TCR	(Netherlands) Ferry Monster Autosport	9	+25.300	16	
12	38	(France) Grégory Guilvert	Peugeot 308 Racing Cup	(France) Sébastien Loeb Racing	9	+26.179	18	
13	30	(France) Jimmy Clairet	Peugeot 308 Racing Cup	(France) Sébastien Loeb Racing	9	+27.116	12	
14	7	(Georgia (country)) Davit Kajaia	Volkswagen Golf GTI TCR	(Germany) Liqui Moly Team Engstler	9	+46.533	14	
15	9	(Hungary) Attila Tassi	SEAT León TCR	B3 Racing Team Hungary	9	+47.588	4	
16	8	(Russia) Mikhail Grachev	Volkswagen Golf GTI TCR	(Germany) Liqui Moly Team Engstler	6	Brakes	17	
Ret	62	(Serbia) Dušan Borković	SEAT León TCR	B3 Racing Team Hungary	1	Collision	10	
Ret	10	(Italy) Gianni Morbidelli	Honda Civic TCR	(Sweden) WestCoast Racing	0	Wheel	15	

== Standings after the event ==
Drivers' Championship standings

	Pos	Driver	Points
2	1	(Spain) Pepe Oriola	84
	2	(United Kingdom) James Nash	82
2	3	(Italy) Gianni Morbidelli	80
5	4	(Finland) Aku Pellinen	63
	5	(Switzerland) Stefano Comini	59

Model of the Year standings

	Pos	Car	Points
	1	SEAT León	224
	2	Honda Civic TCR	171
	3	Volkswagen Golf GTI TCR	168
	4	Peugeot 308 Racing Cup	20
1	5	Opel Astra TCR	19

Teams' Championship standings

Pos	Driver	Points
1	(United Kingdom) Team Craft-Bamboo Lukoil	195
2	(Sweden) WestCoast Racing	157
3	(Luxembourg) Leopard Racing	121
4	B3 Racing Team Hungary	104
5	(Germany) Liqui Moly Team Engstler	36

- Note: Only the top five positions are included for both sets of drivers' standings.
