= 2016 TCR International Series Sochi round =

All the potato got over 19

(Russia) 2016 TCR International Series Sochi round
Round details
- Round 7 of 11 rounds in the 2016 TCR International Series
- Layout of the Sochi Autodrom
- Location: Sochi Autodrom, Sochi, Russia
- Course: Permanent racing facility 5.848 km (3.634 mi)

TCR International Series

Race 1
- Date: 3 July 2016
- Laps: 11

Pole position
| Driver | (Switzerland) Stefano Comini | Leopard Racing |
- Time: 2:21.130

Podium
| First | (Switzerland) Stefano Comini | Leopard Racing |
| Second | (Spain) Pepe Oriola | Team Craft-Bamboo Lukoil |
| Third | (Italy) Gianni Morbidelli | WestCoast Racing |

Fastest lap
| Driver | (Switzerland) Stefano Comini | Leopard Racing |
- Time: 2:21.315 (on lap 3)

Race 2
- Date: 3 July 2016
- Laps: 11

Podium
| First | (Russia) Mikhail Grachev | WestCoast Racing |
| Second | (France) Jean-Karl Vernay | Leopard Racing |
| Third | (Hungary) Attila Tassi | B3 Racing Team Hungary |

Fastest lap
| Driver | (Switzerland) Stefano Comini | Leopard Racing |
- Time: 2:21.213 (on lap 2)

The 2016 TCR International Series Sochi round was the seventh round of the 2016 TCR International Series season. It took place on 2–3 July at the Sochi Autodrom.

Stefano Comini won the first race, starting from pole position, driving a Volkswagen Golf GTI TCR, and Mikhail Grachev gained the second one, driving a Honda Civic TCR.

== Ballast ==
Due to the results obtained in the previous round, Dušan Borković received +30 kg, Maťo Homola +20 kg and James Nash +10 kg.

In addition, the Balance of Performance was reviewed for this round: the Volkswagen Golf GTI TCR's ride height has been reduced by 10mm.

== Classification ==
=== Qualifying ===
| Pos. | No. | Driver | Car | Team | Q1 | Q2 | Grid | Points |
|---|---|---|---|---|---|---|---|---|
| 1 | 1 | (Switzerland) Stefano Comini | Volkswagen Golf GTI TCR | (Luxembourg) Leopard Racing | 2:21.876 | 2:21.130 | 1 | 5 |
| 2 | 74 | (Spain) Pepe Oriola | SEAT León TCR | (United Kingdom) Team Craft-Bamboo Lukoil | 2:21.734 | 2:21.271 | 2 | 4 |
| 3 | 2 | (France) Jean-Karl Vernay | Volkswagen Golf GTI TCR | (Luxembourg) Leopard Racing | 2:22.206 | 2:21.434 | 3 | 3 |
| 4 | 10 | (Italy) Gianni Morbidelli | Honda Civic TCR | (Sweden) WestCoast Racing | 2:22.522 | 2:21.699 | 4 | 2 |
| 5 | 22 | (Czech Republic) Petr Fulín | Alfa Romeo Giulietta TCR | (Italy) Mulsanne Racing | 2:22.282 | 2:21.954 | 5 | 1 |
| 6 | 62 | (Serbia) Dušan Borković | SEAT León TCR | B3 Racing Team Hungary | 2:22.283 | 2:21.998 | 6 | |
| 7 | 54 | (United Kingdom) James Nash | SEAT León TCR | (United Kingdom) Team Craft-Bamboo Lukoil | 2:22.389 | 2:22.011 | 7 | |
| 8 | 8 | (Russia) Mikhail Grachev | Honda Civic TCR | (Sweden) WestCoast Racing | 2:23.035 | 2:22.171 | 8 | |
| 9 | 70 | (Slovakia) Maťo Homola | SEAT León TCR | B3 Racing Team Hungary | 2:23.114 | 2:22.247 | 9 | |
| 10 | 9 | (Hungary) Attila Tassi | SEAT León TCR | B3 Racing Team Hungary | 2:23.138 | 2:22.386 | 10 | |
| 11 | 77 | (Russia) Sergey Afanasyev | SEAT León TCR | (United Kingdom) Team Craft-Bamboo Lukoil | 2:23.058 | 2:22.475 | 11 | |
| 12 | 7 | (Georgia (country)) Davit Kajaia | Volkswagen Golf GTI TCR | (Germany) Liqui Moly Team Engstler | 2:23.522 | 2:23.089 | 12 | |
| 13 | 18 | (Russia) Ildar Rakhmatullin | Honda Civic TCR | (Sweden) WestCoast Racing | 2:24.025 | | 13 | |
| 14 | 46 | (Russia) Vladimir Sheshenin | Volkswagen Golf GTI TCR | (Germany) Liqui Moly Team Engstler | 2:24.108 | | 14 | |
| 15 | 88 | (Italy) Michela Cerruti | Alfa Romeo Giulietta TCR | (Italy) Mulsanne Racing | 2:24.944 | | 15 | |

=== Race 1 ===
| Pos. | No. | Driver | Car | Team | Laps | Time/Retired | Grid | Points |
|---|---|---|---|---|---|---|---|---|
| 1 | 1 | (Switzerland) Stefano Comini | Volkswagen Golf GTI TCR | (Luxembourg) Leopard Racing | 11 | 26:08.805 | 1 | 25 |
| 2 | 74 | (Spain) Pepe Oriola | SEAT León TCR | (United Kingdom) Team Craft-Bamboo Lukoil | 11 | +1.915 | 2 | 18 |
| 3 | 10 | (Italy) Gianni Morbidelli | Honda Civic TCR | (Sweden) WestCoast Racing | 11 | +8.078 | 4 | 15 |
| 4 | 8 | (Russia) Mikhail Grachev | Honda Civic TCR | (Sweden) WestCoast Racing | 11 | +16.704 | 8 | 12 |
| 5 | 2 | (France) Jean-Karl Vernay | Volkswagen Golf GTI TCR | (Luxembourg) Leopard Racing | 11 | +17.718 | 3 | 10 |
| 6 | 22 | (Czech Republic) Petr Fulín | Alfa Romeo Giulietta TCR | (Italy) Mulsanne Racing | 11 | +20.396 | 5 | 8 |
| 7 | 7 | (Georgia (country)) Davit Kajaia | Volkswagen Golf GTI TCR | (Germany) Liqui Moly Team Engstler | 11 | +21.173 | 12 | 6 |
| 8 | 54 | (United Kingdom) James Nash | SEAT León TCR | (United Kingdom) Team Craft-Bamboo Lukoil | 11 | +22.867^{1} | 3 | 4 |
| 9 | 70 | (Slovakia) Maťo Homola | SEAT León TCR | B3 Racing Team Hungary | 11 | +23.080 | 9 | 2 |
| 10 | 9 | (Hungary) Attila Tassi | SEAT León TCR | B3 Racing Team Hungary | 11 | +23.995 | 10 | 1 |
| 11 | 18 | (Russia) Ildar Rakhmatullin | Honda Civic TCR | (Sweden) WestCoast Racing | 11 | +38.890 | 14 | |
| 12 | 88 | (Italy) Michela Cerruti | Alfa Romeo Giulietta TCR | (Italy) Mulsanne Racing | 11 | +40.382 | 15 | |
| 13 | 77 | (Russia) Sergey Afanasyev | SEAT León TCR | (United Kingdom) Team Craft-Bamboo Lukoil | 11 | +41.097 | 11 | |
| 14 | 62 | (Serbia) Dušan Borković | SEAT León TCR | B3 Racing Team Hungary | 11 | +44.735^{2} | 6 | |
| Ret | 19 | (Russia) Vladimir Sheshenin | Volkswagen Golf GTI TCR | (Germany) Liqui Moly Team Engstler | 3 | Accident | 14 | |

Notes

- ^1 — James Nash was given a 10-second penalty for causing a collision with Jean-Karl Vernay.
- ^2 — Dušan Borković was given a 30-second penalty for exceeding track limits repeatedly during the race.

=== Race 2 ===
| Pos. | No. | Driver | Car | Team | Laps | Time/Retired | Grid | Points |
|---|---|---|---|---|---|---|---|---|
| 1 | 8 | (Russia) Mikhail Grachev | Honda Civic TCR | (Sweden) WestCoast Racing | 11 | 26:14.025 | 3 | 25 |
| 2 | 2 | (France) Jean-Karl Vernay | Volkswagen Golf GTI TCR | (Luxembourg) Leopard Racing | 11 | +1.254 | 8 | 18 |
| 3 | 9 | (Hungary) Attila Tassi | SEAT León TCR | B3 Racing Team Hungary | 11 | +5.954 | 1 | 15 |
| 4 | 54 | (United Kingdom) James Nash | SEAT León TCR | (United Kingdom) Team Craft-Bamboo Lukoil | 11 | +6.589 | 4 | 12 |
| 5 | 1 | (Switzerland) Stefano Comini | Volkswagen Golf GTI TCR | (Luxembourg) Leopard Racing | 11 | +7.962 | 10 | 10 |
| 6 | 62 | (Serbia) Dušan Borković | SEAT León TCR | B3 Racing Team Hungary | 11 | +8.253 | 5 | 8 |
| 7 | 77 | (Russia) Sergey Afanasyev | SEAT León TCR | (United Kingdom) Team Craft-Bamboo Lukoil | 11 | +13.977 | 11 | 6 |
| 8 | 22 | (Czech Republic) Petr Fulín | Alfa Romeo Giulietta TCR | (Italy) Mulsanne Racing | 11 | +16.128 | 6 | 4 |
| 9 | 70 | (Slovakia) Maťo Homola | SEAT León TCR | B3 Racing Team Hungary | 11 | +20.603^{3} | 2 | 2 |
| 10 | 19 | (Russia) Vladimir Sheshenin | Volkswagen Golf GTI TCR | (Germany) Liqui Moly Team Engstler | 11 | +24.691 | 15 | 1 |
| 11 | 7 | (Georgia (country)) Davit Kajaia | Volkswagen Golf GTI TCR | (Germany) Liqui Moly Team Engstler | 11 | +41.795^{4} | 12 | |
| 12 | 10 | (Italy) Gianni Morbidelli | Honda Civic TCR | (Sweden) WestCoast Racing | 9 | Suspension | 7 | |
| 13 | 74 | (Spain) Pepe Oriola | SEAT León TCR | (United Kingdom) Team Craft-Bamboo Lukoil | 8 | Puncture | 9 | |
| Ret | 88 | (Italy) Michela Cerruti | Alfa Romeo Giulietta TCR | (Italy) Mulsanne Racing | 5 | Technical | 14 | |
| Ret | 18 | (Russia) Ildar Rakhmatullin | Honda Civic TCR | (Sweden) WestCoast Racing | 3 | Gearbox | 13 | |

Notes

- ^3 — Maťo Homola was given a 5-second penalty for not being lined up correctly in his starting position.
- ^4 — Davit Kajaia was given a 30-second penalty for exceeding track limits repeatedly during the race.

== Standings after the event ==
Drivers' Championship standings

| | Pos | Driver | Points |
|---|---|---|---|
| 3 | 1 | (Switzerland) Stefano Comini | 168 |
| 1 | 2 | (Spain) Pepe Oriola | 167 |
| 1 | 3 | (United Kingdom) James Nash | 161 |
| 1 | 4 | (France) Jean-Karl Vernay | 146 |
| 2 | 5 | (Slovakia) Maťo Homola | 145 |

Model of the Year standings

| Pos | Car | Points |
|---|---|---|
| 1 | SEAT León | 503 |
| 2 | Volkswagen Golf GTI TCR | 424 |
| 3 | Honda Civic TCR | 371 |
| 4 | Alfa Romeo Giulietta TCR | 65 |
| 5 | Peugeot 308 Racing Cup | 24 |

Teams' Championship standings

| | Pos | Driver | Points |
|---|---|---|---|
| | 1 | (United Kingdom) Team Craft-Bamboo Lukoil | 405 |
| 2 | 2 | (Luxembourg) Leopard Racing | 322 |
| | 3 | (Sweden) WestCoast Racing | 312 |
| 2 | 4 | B3 Racing Team Hungary | 289 |
| | 5 | (Germany) Liqui Moly Team Engstler | 108 |

- Note: Only the top five positions are included for both sets of drivers' standings.
