= 2016 TCR International Series =

Car championship

Seasons
- ← 2015 2017 →

The 2016 TCR International Series was the second season of the TCR International Series.

Stefano Comini successfully defended his title, beating his nearest challenger James Nash by 2.5 points. Craft-Bamboo Racing were crowned teams' champions beating Leopard Racing with 73 points margin, while Seat Léon TCR won the models' championship.

== Teams and drivers ==
Michelin is the official tire supplier, but Neric Wei, Tang Chi Lun and Edgar Lau used Yokohama tires at Macau.

Team	Car	No.	Drivers	Rounds
(Luxembourg) Leopard Racing	Volkswagen Golf GTI TCR	1	(Switzerland) Stefano Comini	All
(Luxembourg) Leopard Racing	Volkswagen Golf GTI TCR	2	(France) Jean-Karl Vernay	All
(Luxembourg) Leopard Racing	Volkswagen Golf GTI TCR	48	(Finland) Antti Buri	3
(Germany) Liqui Moly Team Engstler	Volkswagen Golf GTI TCR	3	(Hong Kong) Andy Yan	10–11
(Germany) Liqui Moly Team Engstler	Volkswagen Golf GTI TCR	6	(Spain) Jordi Oriola	11
(Germany) Liqui Moly Team Engstler	Volkswagen Golf GTI TCR	7	(Georgia (country)) Davit Kajaia	All
(Germany) Liqui Moly Team Engstler	Volkswagen Golf GTI TCR	8	(Russia) Mikhail Grachev	1–3
(Germany) Liqui Moly Team Engstler	Volkswagen Golf GTI TCR	19	(Russia) Vladimir Sheshenin	7
(Germany) Liqui Moly Team Engstler	Volkswagen Golf GTI TCR	45	(Austria) Florian Janits	5
(Germany) Liqui Moly Team Engstler	Volkswagen Golf GTI TCR	46	(Germany) Niklas Mackschin	6
(Germany) Liqui Moly Team Engstler	Volkswagen Golf GTI TCR	47	(United States) Gary Sheehan	6
(Germany) Liqui Moly Team Engstler	Volkswagen Golf GTI TCR	52	(Spain) Jordi Gené	4
(Germany) Liqui Moly Team Engstler	Volkswagen Golf GTI TCR	55	(Thailand) Munkong Sathienthirakul	8
(Germany) Liqui Moly Team Engstler	Volkswagen Golf GTI TCR	68	(Macau) Filipe de Souza	9–10
(Italy) Target Competition	Honda Civic Type R TCR (FK2)	5	(Italy) Roberto Colciago	10
(Italy) Target Competition	Honda Civic Type R TCR (FK2)	33	(Spain) Jordi Oriola	4–5
(Italy) Target Competition	Honda Civic Type R TCR (FK2)	35	(France) Rafaël Galiana	9–10
(Italy) Target Competition	Honda Civic Type R TCR (FK2)	50	(United Kingdom) Josh Files	11
(Italy) Target Competition	Opel Astra TCR	23	(Italy) Andrea Belicchi	1
(Italy) Target Competition	Opel Astra TCR	33	(Spain) Jordi Oriola	1
(Italy) Target Competition	SEAT León TCR	35	(France) Rafaël Galiana	11
(Italy) Target Competition	SEAT León TCR	50	(Netherlands) Loris Hezemans	9–10
(Sweden) WestCoast Racing	Honda Civic Type R TCR (FK2)	8	(Russia) Mikhail Grachev	4–11
(Sweden) WestCoast Racing	Honda Civic Type R TCR (FK2)	10	(Italy) Gianni Morbidelli	All
(Sweden) WestCoast Racing	Honda Civic Type R TCR (FK2)	14	(Finland) Aku Pellinen	1–3
(Sweden) WestCoast Racing	Honda Civic Type R TCR (FK2)	18	(Russia) Ildar Rakhmatullin	7
(Sweden) WestCoast Racing	Honda Civic Type R TCR (FK2)	24	(United States) Kevin Gleason	1–3, 9–10
(Sweden) WestCoast Racing	Honda Civic Type R TCR (FK2)	35	(France) Rafaël Galiana	8
(Sweden) WestCoast Racing	Honda Civic Type R TCR (FK2)	40	(Switzerland) Alain Menu	4
(Sweden) WestCoast Racing	Honda Civic Type R TCR (FK2)	43	(Austria) Harald Proczyk	5
(Sweden) WestCoast Racing	Honda Civic Type R TCR (FK2)	81	(Portugal) Tiago Monteiro	11
B3 Racing Team Hungary	SEAT León TCR	9	(Hungary) Attila Tassi	All
B3 Racing Team Hungary	SEAT León TCR	62	(Serbia) Dušan Borković	All
B3 Racing Team Hungary	SEAT León TCR	70	(Slovakia) Maťo Homola	All
(Thailand) Kratingdaeng Racing Team	SEAT León Cup Racer	11	(Thailand) Grant Supaphongs	8
(Thailand) Kratingdaeng Racing Team	SEAT León Cup Racer	12	(Germany) Alexander Mies	8
(Thailand) Kratingdaeng Racing Team	SEAT León Cup Racer	58	(Taiwan) Chen Jian Hong	8
(Thailand) Vattana Motorsport	Honda Civic Type R TCR (FK2)	13	(Thailand) Narasak Ittiritpong	8
(Thailand) Vattana Motorsport	SEAT León Cup Racer	44	(Thailand) Jack Lemvard	8
(Thailand) Team Eakie BBR Kaiten	Honda Civic Type R TCR (FK2)	15	(Thailand) Kantadhee Kusiri	8
(Hong Kong) Roadstar Racing	SEAT León Cup Racer	17	(Hong Kong) Terence Tse	11
(Italy) Mulsanne Racing	Alfa Romeo Giulietta TCR	20	(Italy) Mario Ferraris	10
(Italy) Mulsanne Racing	Alfa Romeo Giulietta TCR	22	(Czech Republic) Petr Fulín	5–9, 11
(Italy) Mulsanne Racing	Alfa Romeo Giulietta TCR	23	(Italy) Andrea Belicchi	11
(Italy) Mulsanne Racing	Alfa Romeo Giulietta TCR	88	(Italy) Michela Cerruti	1–2, 5–7
(Macau) Elegant Racing Team	SEAT León TCR	20	(Macau) Lou Hon Kei	11
(Spain) Baporo Motorsport	SEAT León Cup Racer	26	(Portugal) Francisco Mora	2
(Spain) Baporo Motorsport	SEAT León TCR	50	(Netherlands) Loris Hezemans	2
(Hong Kong) TeamWork Motorsport	Volkswagen Golf GTI TCR	27	(Hong Kong) William O'Brien	10–11
(Hong Kong) TeamWork Motorsport	Volkswagen Golf GTI TCR	28	(Macau) Kevin Tse	10–11
(France) Sébastien Loeb Racing	Peugeot 308 Racing Cup	30	(France) Jimmy Clairet	3
(France) Sébastien Loeb Racing	Peugeot 308 Racing Cup	38	(France) Grégory Guilvert	3
(Italy) Top Run Motorsport	Subaru Impreza STi TCR	31	(Italy) Luca Rangoni	2
(Italy) Top Run Motorsport	Subaru Impreza STi TCR	32	(Italy) Luigi Ferrara	1, 8
(Germany) Kissling Motorsport	Opel Astra TCR	33	(Spain) Jordi Oriola	9
(China) Champ Motorsport	Honda Civic Type R TCR (FK2)	38	(Macau) Michael Ho	11
(Italy) B.D. Racing	SEAT León TCR	41	(Italy) Carlotta Fedeli	4
(Italy) B.D. Racing	SEAT León Cup Racer	42	(Italy) Alessandra Neri	4
(Finland) LMS Racing	SEAT León Cup Racer	48	(Finland) Antti Buri	6, 11
(Finland) LMS Racing	SEAT León Cup Racer	51	(Finland) Kari-Pekka Laaksonen	8
(Netherlands) Ferry Monster Autosport	SEAT León Cup Racer	49	(Belgium) Pierre-Yves Corthals	3
(Netherlands) Ferry Monster Autosport	SEAT León TCR	50	(Netherlands) Loris Hezemans	3
(Hong Kong) Team Craft-Bamboo Lukoil	SEAT León TCR	54	(United Kingdom) James Nash	All
(Hong Kong) Team Craft-Bamboo Lukoil	SEAT León TCR	74	(Spain) Pepe Oriola	All
(Hong Kong) Team Craft-Bamboo Lukoil	SEAT León TCR	77	(Russia) Sergey Afanasyev	All
(Macau) Son Veng Racing Team	Volkswagen Golf GTI TCR	64	(China) Neric Wei	9
(Malaysia) Viper Niza Racing	SEAT León TCR	65	(Malaysia) Douglas Khoo	9–11
(Thailand) TBN MK Ihere Racing Team	Honda Civic Type R TCR (FK2)	66	(Thailand) Nattachak Hanjitkasen	8
(Hong Kong) FRD Motorsports	Ford Focus TCR	72	(Netherlands) Nicky Pastorelli	10
(Hong Kong) FRD Motorsports	Ford Focus TCR	99	(China) Martin Cao	9
(Netherlands) Bas Koeten Racing	SEAT León Cup Racer	78	(Bahrain) Salman Al Khalifa	1
(Netherlands) Bas Koeten Racing	SEAT León Cup Racer	79	(Bahrain) Hussain Karimi	1
Team Thailand	Honda Civic Type R TCR (FK2)	83	(Thailand) Tin Sritrai	10–11
(Thailand) Sloth Racing	SEAT León Cup Racer	97	(Thailand) Paritat Bulbon	8
non-classified TCR and CTCC entries are ineligible to score points
(Hong Kong) Suncity Racing Team	Citroën C-Elysée	11	(Hong Kong) Alex Hui	11
(Hong Kong) Suncity Racing Team	Citroën C-Elysée	12	(Hong Kong) Sunny Wong	11
(Macau) Son Veng Racing Team	Volkswagen Golf GTI TCR	14	(China) Neric Wei	11
(China) Linky Racing Team	Audi S3 Saloon	21	(China) Zhang Ya Qi	11
(China) Linky Racing Team	Audi S3 Saloon	33	(China) Jiang Teng Yi	11
(Hong Kong) Team TRC	Honda Civic Type R TCR (FK2)	68	(Hong Kong) Tang Chi Lun	11
(Hong Kong) FRD Motorsports	Ford Focus TCR	78	(Hong Kong) Kenneth Ma	11
(Macau) Asia Racing Team	SEAT León TCR	97	(Hong Kong) Edgar Lau	11

== Calendar ==
The 2016 schedule was announced on 2 December 2015, with twelve events scheduled. Three out of these twelve rounds are to be held supporting Formula One. The calendar was subsequently modified: the Shanghai round was canceled and replaced by Buriram (originally scheduled to be held on 30 October). On 5 May the Italian round was moved to Imola.

Rnd.		Circuit	Date	Supporting
1	1	Bahrain International Circuit, Sakhir	2 April	Bahrain Grand Prix
1	2	Bahrain International Circuit, Sakhir	3 April	Bahrain Grand Prix
2	3	(Portugal) Autódromo do Estoril, Estoril	24 April	International GT Open; Euroformula Open Championship; SEAT León Eurocup
2	4	(Portugal) Autódromo do Estoril, Estoril	24 April	International GT Open; Euroformula Open Championship; SEAT León Eurocup
3	5	(Belgium) Circuit de Spa-Francorchamps, Francorchamps	6 May	6 Hours of Spa-Francorchamps
3	6	(Belgium) Circuit de Spa-Francorchamps, Francorchamps	7 May	6 Hours of Spa-Francorchamps
4	7	(Italy) Autodromo Enzo e Dino Ferrari, Imola	22 May	Stand-alone event
4	8	(Italy) Autodromo Enzo e Dino Ferrari, Imola	22 May	Stand-alone event
5	9	(Austria) Salzburgring, Salzburg	5 June	Stand-alone event
5	10	(Austria) Salzburgring, Salzburg	5 June	Stand-alone event
6	11	(Germany) Motorsport Arena Oschersleben, Oschersleben	19 June	ADAC TCR Germany Championship
6	12	(Germany) Motorsport Arena Oschersleben, Oschersleben	19 June	ADAC TCR Germany Championship
7	13	(Russia) Sochi Autodrom, Sochi	3 July	Russian Circuit Racing Series
7	14	(Russia) Sochi Autodrom, Sochi	3 July	Russian Circuit Racing Series
8	15	(Thailand) Chang International Circuit, Buriram	28 August	Stand-alone event
8	16	(Thailand) Chang International Circuit, Buriram	28 August	Stand-alone event
9	17	Marina Bay Street Circuit, Singapore	17 September	Singapore Grand Prix
9	18	Marina Bay Street Circuit, Singapore	18 September	Singapore Grand Prix
10	19	(Malaysia) Sepang International Circuit, Kuala Lumpur	1 October	Malaysian Grand Prix; TCR Asia Series
10	20	(Malaysia) Sepang International Circuit, Kuala Lumpur	2 October	Malaysian Grand Prix; TCR Asia Series
11	21	Guia Circuit, Macau	20 November	Macau Grand Prix; FIA GT World Cup; TCR Asia Series
11	22	Guia Circuit, Macau	20 November	Macau Grand Prix; FIA GT World Cup; TCR Asia Series

== Results ==
Rnd.		Circuit	Pole position	Fastest lap	Winning driver	Winning team	Report
1	1	Bahrain International Circuit	(Russia) Sergey Afanasyev	(Italy) Gianni Morbidelli	(Spain) Pepe Oriola	(Hong Kong) Team Craft-Bamboo Lukoil	Report
1	2	Bahrain International Circuit		(Spain) Pepe Oriola	(Spain) Pepe Oriola	(Hong Kong) Team Craft-Bamboo Lukoil	Report
2	3	(Portugal) Autódromo do Estoril	(Slovakia) Maťo Homola	(Slovakia) Maťo Homola	(Italy) Gianni Morbidelli	(Sweden) WestCoast Racing	Report
2	4	(Portugal) Autódromo do Estoril		(Italy) Gianni Morbidelli	(United Kingdom) James Nash	(Hong Kong) Team Craft-Bamboo Lukoil	Report
3	5	(Belgium) Circuit de Spa-Francorchamps	(Serbia) Dušan Borković	(France) Jean-Karl Vernay	(Finland) Aku Pellinen	(Sweden) WestCoast Racing	Report
3	6	(Belgium) Circuit de Spa-Francorchamps		(France) Jean-Karl Vernay	(France) Jean-Karl Vernay	(Luxembourg) Leopard Racing	Report
4	7	(Italy) Autodromo Enzo e Dino Ferrari	(Italy) Gianni Morbidelli	(Spain) Pepe Oriola	(Switzerland) Stefano Comini	(Luxembourg) Leopard Racing	Report
4	8	(Italy) Autodromo Enzo e Dino Ferrari		(Spain) Jordi Oriola	(Russia) Mikhail Grachev	(Sweden) WestCoast Racing	Report
5	9	(Austria) Salzburgring	(Austria) Harald Proczyk	(United Kingdom) James Nash	(Russia) Mikhail Grachev	(Sweden) WestCoast Racing	Report
5	10	(Austria) Salzburgring		(France) Jean-Karl Vernay	(France) Jean-Karl Vernay	(Luxembourg) Leopard Racing	Report
6	11	(Germany) Motorsport Arena Oschersleben	(Serbia) Dušan Borković	(Slovakia) Maťo Homola	(Slovakia) Maťo Homola	B3 Racing Team Hungary	Report
6	12	(Germany) Motorsport Arena Oschersleben		(Serbia) Dušan Borković	(Spain) Pepe Oriola	(Hong Kong) Team Craft-Bamboo Lukoil	Report
7	13	(Russia) Sochi Autodrom	(Switzerland) Stefano Comini	(Switzerland) Stefano Comini	(Switzerland) Stefano Comini	(Luxembourg) Leopard Racing	Report
7	14	(Russia) Sochi Autodrom		(Switzerland) Stefano Comini	(Russia) Mikhail Grachev	(Sweden) WestCoast Racing	Report
8	15	(Thailand) Chang International Circuit	(Spain) Pepe Oriola	(Italy) Gianni Morbidelli	(Spain) Pepe Oriola	(Hong Kong) Team Craft-Bamboo Lukoil	Report
8	16	(Thailand) Chang International Circuit		(United Kingdom) James Nash	(United Kingdom) James Nash	(Hong Kong) Team Craft-Bamboo Lukoil	Report
9	17	(Singapore) Marina Bay Street Circuit	(France) Jean-Karl Vernay	(France) Jean-Karl Vernay	(France) Jean-Karl Vernay	(Luxembourg) Leopard Racing	Report
9	18	(Singapore) Marina Bay Street Circuit		(Russia) Mikhail Grachev	(Russia) Mikhail Grachev	(Sweden) WestCoast Racing	Report
10	19	(Malaysia) Sepang International Circuit	(Italy) Roberto Colciago	(Switzerland) Stefano Comini	(Italy) Roberto Colciago	(Italy) Target Competition	Report
10	20	(Malaysia) Sepang International Circuit		(Switzerland) Stefano Comini	(United States) Kevin Gleason	(Sweden) WestCoast Racing	Report
11	21	(Macau) Guia Circuit	(France) Jean-Karl Vernay	(Hong Kong) Edgar Lau	(Switzerland) Stefano Comini	(Luxembourg) Leopard Racing	Report
11	22	(Macau) Guia Circuit		(Spain) Pepe Oriola	(Portugal) Tiago Monteiro	(Sweden) WestCoast Racing	Report

== Fan Award ==
Starting from this year, the Man of the Race is replaced by the Fan Award. At the end of every weekend, a panel consisting of the International Series’ Promoter and the promotional and media team name two candidates who stood out during the event for a particular reason.

Race	Candidates	Reason	Percentage
(Bahrain) Sakhir	(Georgia (country)) Davit Kajaia (Spain) Pepe Oriola	For fighting with no sign of nerves despite his lack of experience For his impressive driving on the way to a double victory	83.8% 16.2%
(Portugal) Estoril	(Slovakia) Maťo Homola (Italy) Gianni Morbidelli	For an excellent pole position and a superb fight with Morbidelli in race 1 For getting his championship fight back on track with two great races	86.4% 13.6%
(Belgium) Spa-Francorchamps	(Finland) Antti Buri (Finland) Aku Pellinen	For his impressive performance: a podium on his debut with the Golf and in the International Series; For his mature drive to race 1 victory and for being the only Honda driver to make it through to Q2	41.1% 58.9%
(Italy) Imola	(Russia) Mikhail Grachev (Switzerland) Stefano Comini	For showing grit and perseverance in chasing his maiden race victory For his masterful overtaking manoeuvre on Pepe Oriola in Race 2	41.9% 58.1%
(Austria) Salzburgring	(Serbia) Dušan Borković (France) Jean-Karl Vernay	For his incredible overtaking manoeuvre in Race 1, in which he passed two cars in lap 5 For the way he re-took the lead he lost to Afanasyev in Race 2 after making a mistake	93.1% 6.9%
(Germany) Oschersleben	(Italy) Michela Cerruti (Finland) Antti Buri	For fighting for points-scoring positions in both races and defending well For being the workaholic of the weekend, running in four races over two days	76.7% 23.3%
(Russia) Sochi	(Hungary) Attila Tassi (Czech Republic) Petr Fulín	For defending his first podium result against more experienced drivers For his contribution in the development of the Alfa Romeo Giulietta	39.0% 61.0%
(Thailand) Buriram	(Georgia (country)) Davit Kajaia (Thailand) Kantadhee Kusiri	For overtaking five cars all together in Race 2 For his overall performance, but particularly in Race 2	71.3% 28.7%
Singapore	(Sweden) WestCoast Racing (Belgium) Leopard Racing	For rebuilding Morbideli’s car in a race against time For dominating the first two days of the event, on their first visit here	62.4% 37.6%
(Malaysia) Sepang	(Italy) Roberto Colciago (Thailand) Tin Sritrai	For winning an exciting fight with Comini in Race 1, with grit and fairness For fighting on equal terms with the International Series top drivers	14.6% 85.4%
Macau	(United Kingdom) Tom Evans (Belgium) Arnaud Libois	For overseeing the repair of the car that enabled Nash to start Race 2 For consistently delivering a car that took Comini to his second title	52.1% 47.9%

== Championship standings ==
=== Drivers' championship ===
Pos.	Driver	BHR (Bahrain)		EST (Portugal)		SPA (Belgium)		IMO (Italy)		SAL (Austria)		OSC (Germany)		SOC (Russia)		BUR (Thailand)		SIN (Singapore)		SEP (Malaysia)		MAC† (Macau)		Pts.
1	(Switzerland) Stefano Comini	7	Ret	3^{4}	2	Ret	2	1^{4}	3	8	3	Ret	6	**1**^{1}	5	4^{4}	4	2^{3}	4	2	18	1^{2}	4	267.5
2	(United Kingdom) James Nash	3^{3}	2	6	1	8^{5}	6	Ret	DNS	2	4	3^{3}	3	8	4	2	1	5^{5}	3	3	2	18†	8	264
3	(France) Jean-Karl Vernay	Ret	DSQ	2^{3}	5	14	1	11	4	5^{1}	1	6	Ret	5^{3}	2	5^{3}	8	**1**^{1}	6	5^{4}	5	**2**^{1}	2	246
4	(Spain) Pepe Oriola	1^{5}	1	8	10	2^{2}	7	2^{2}	5	12†^{2}	DNS	10	1	2^{2}	13†	**1**^{1}	11	3^{4}	14	4^{2}	12	5	3	241.5
5	(Slovakia) Maťo Homola	8	11	**4**^{1}	8	4	4	5	2	3	5	1^{2}	5	9	9	Ret^{5}	10	4^{2}	5	10^{5}	16	Ret	DNS	175
6	(Italy) Gianni Morbidelli	2^{4}	7	1^{2}	3	5	Ret	**Ret**^{1}	Ret	4	6	7	10	3^{4}	12†	3^{2}	Ret	10	7	DNS	3	Ret	DNS	174
7	(Serbia) Dušan Borković	6^{2}	3	12	Ret	**3**^{1}	Ret	12†	DNS	11†^{5}	DNS	**2**^{1}	2	14	6	7	3	7	2	6	4	4^{5}	5	173
8	(Russia) Mikhail Grachev	10	14†	11	11	11	16†	8^{5}	1	1	9	Ret	12	4	1	21	2	11	1	Ret^{3}	Ret	11	7	145
9	(Russia) Sergey Afanasyev	**4**^{1}	5	5^{5}	4	9^{4}	9	4	Ret	Ret	2	4^{5}	4	13	7	9	7	6	Ret	9	7	Ret	DNS	141
10	(Georgia (country)) Davit Kajaia	9	4	13	7	7	14	3^{3}	8	7	Ret	8	Ret	7	11	10	5	17†	8	Ret	10	15	15	80
11	(Hungary) Attila Tassi	DNS	DNS	14	13	16†	15	7	7	6	8	DSQ	7	10	3	8	6	9	17†	7	9	20	Ret	68
12	(Finland) Aku Pellinen	5	10	7	6	1^{3}	5																	63
13	(United States) Kevin Gleason	Ret	13†	Ret	12	6	8											8	10	8	1			46
14	(Italy) Roberto Colciago																			**1**^{1}	Ret			30
15	(Finland) Antti Buri					10	3					5^{4}	Ret									23†^{4}	Ret	30
16	(Portugal) Tiago Monteiro																					3^{3}	1	23
17	(Spain) Jordi Oriola	11	6					Ret	9	Ret^{4}	7							12	11			WD	WD	17
18	(Spain) Jordi Gené							6	6															16
19	(Czech Republic) Petr Fulín									Ret	DNS	13†	Ret	6^{5}	8	20†	DNS	NC	9			Ret	DNS	15
20	(Netherlands) Loris Hezemans			9	Ret	15	11											16†	Ret	11	6			10
21	(Thailand) Kantadhee Kusiri															6	9							10
22	(Germany) Niklas Mackschin											9	8											6
23	(Austria) Harald Proczyk									**Ret**^{3}	Ret													5
24	(United Kingdom) Josh Files																					14	6	4.5
25	(Hong Kong) Andy Yan																			13	8	19	10	4.5
26	(Italy) Luigi Ferrara	12	8													Ret	DNS							4
27	(Thailand) Tin Sritrai																			Ret	13	7	12	4
28	(Italy) Andrea Belicchi	14	Ret																			8	9	4
29	(Italy) Michela Cerruti	13	Ret	15	14					10	DSQ	12†	9	12	Ret									3
30	(Portugal) Francisco Mora			10	9																			3
31	(Austria) Florian Janits									9	10													3
32	(Italy) Carlotta Fedeli							9	11															2
33	(Bahrain) Salman Al Khalifa	16	9																					2
34	(France) Rafaël Galiana															14	Ret	14	16†	DNS	20	10	14	2
35	(Italy) Alessandra Neri							10	12															1
36	(Belgium) Pierre-Yves Corthals					Ret	10																	1
37	(Switzerland) Alain Menu							Ret	10															1
38	(Russia) Vladimir Sheshenin													Ret	10									1
	(United States) Gary Sheehan											11†	11											0
	(Macau) Kevin Tse																			12	11	17	Ret	0
	(Russia) Ildar Rakhmatullin													11	Ret									0
	(Thailand) Narasak Ittiritpong															11	Ret							0
	(France) Grégory Guilvert					12	12																	0
	(Thailand) Munkong Sathienthirakul															12	Ret							0
	(Germany) Alexander Mies															13	12							0
	(China) Martin Cao																	13	12					0
	(Bahrain) Hussain Karimi	17	12																					0
	(France) Jimmy Clairet					13	13																	0
	(Macau) Filipe de Souza																	Ret	13	14	15			0
	(Finland) Kari-Pekka Laaksonen															17	13							0
	(Thailand) Grant Supaphongs															19	14							0
	(Italy) Mario Ferraris																			Ret	14			0
	(Malaysia) Douglas Khoo																	Ret	15	15	17	DNQ	DNQ	0
	(Taiwan) Chen Jian Hong															15	15							0
	(China) Neric Wei																	15	DSQ					0
	(Thailand) Paritat Bulbon															18	16							0
	(Thailand) Nattachak Hanjitkasen															16	Ret							0
	(Netherlands) Nicky Pastorelli																			16	Ret			0
	(Macau) Lou Hon Kei																					16	Ret	0
	(Hong Kong) William O'Brien																			17	19	DNQ	DNQ	0
	(Thailand) Jack Lemvard															Ret	17							0
	(Italy) Luca Rangoni			Ret	Ret																			0
	(Hong Kong) Terence Tse																					DNQ	DNQ	0
	(Macau) Michael Ho																					WD	WD	0
Drivers ineligible to score points
	(Hong Kong) Alex Hui																					6	Ret	
	(Hong Kong) Edgar Lau																					9	13	
	(China) Jiang Teng Yi																					13	11	
	(China) Neric Wei																					12	16	
	(China) Zhang Ya Qi																					21	Ret	
	(Hong Kong) Sunny Wong																					22	Ret	
	(Hong Kong) Tang Chi Lun																					Ret	DNS	
	(Hong Kong) William Lok																					DNQ	DNQ	
	(Hong Kong) Kenneth Ma																					DNQ	DNQ	
Pos.	Driver	BHR (Bahrain)		EST (Portugal)		SPA (Belgium)		IMO (Italy)		SAL (Austria)		OSC (Germany)		SOC (Russia)		BUR (Thailand)		SIN (Singapore)		SEP (Malaysia)		MAC† (Macau)		Pts.

Colour	Result
Gold	Winner
Silver	Second place
Bronze	Third place
Green	Points classification
Blue	Non-points classification
Blue	Non-classified finish (NC)
Purple	Retired, not classified (Ret)
Red	Did not qualify (DNQ)
Red	Did not pre-qualify (DNPQ)
Black	Disqualified (DSQ)
White	Did not start (DNS)
White	Withdrew (WD)
White	Race cancelled (C)
Blank	Did not practice (DNP)
Blank	Did not arrive (DNA)
Blank	Excluded (EX)

**Bold** – Pole
Italics – Fastest Lap

† – Drivers did not finish the race, but were classified as they completed over 75% of the race distance.

=== Teams' Championship ===
Pos.	Team	BHR (Bahrain)		EST (Portugal)		SPA (Belgium)		IMO (Italy)		SAL (Austria)		OSC (Germany)		SOC (Russia)		BUR (Thailand)		SIN (Singapore)		SEP (Malaysia)		MAC† (Macau)		Pts.
1	(Hong Kong) Team Craft-Bamboo Lukoil	1^{1}	1	5^{5}	1	2^{2}	6	2^{2}	5	2^{2}	2	3^{3}	1	2^{2}	4	1^{1}	1	2^{3}	3	3	2	5	3	594.5
1	(Hong Kong) Team Craft-Bamboo Lukoil	3^{3}	2	6	4	8^{4}	7	4	Ret	12†	4	4^{5}	3	8	7	2	7	3^{4}	14	4^{2}	7	18†	8	594.5
2	(Luxembourg) Leopard Racing	7	Ret	2^{3}	2	10	1	1^{4}	3	5^{1}	1	6	6	1^{1}	2	4^{4}	4	1^{1}	4	2	5	1^{2}	2	521.5
2	(Luxembourg) Leopard Racing	Ret	DSQ	3^{4}	5	14	2	11	4	8	3	Ret	Ret	5^{3}	5	5^{3}	8	2^{3}	6	5^{4}	18	2^{1}	4	521.5
3	(Sweden) WestCoast Racing	2^{4}	7	1^{2}	3	1^{3}	5	8^{1}	1	1^{3}	6	7	10	3^{4}	1	3^{2}	2	8	1	8	1	3^{3}	1	466
3	(Sweden) WestCoast Racing	5^{5}	10	7	6	5	8	Ret^{5}	10	4	9	Ret	12	4	12†	14	20†	10	7	Ret	3	11	7	466
4	B3 Racing Team Hungary	6^{2}	3	4^{1}	8	3^{1}	4	5	2	3^{5}	5	1^{1}	2	9	3	6	3	4	2	6	4	4	5	416
4	B3 Racing Team Hungary	8	11	12	13	4^{5}	15	7	7	6	8	2^{2}	5	10	6	8	6	7	5	7	9	20†	Ret	416
5	(Germany) Liqui Moly Team Engstler	9	4	11	7	7	14	3^{3}	6	7	10	8	8	7	10	10	5	17	8	13	8	15	10	129.5
5	(Germany) Liqui Moly Team Engstler	10	14†	13	11	11	16†	6	8	9	Ret	9	11	Ret	11	12	19†	Ret	13	14	10	19†	15	129.5
7	(Italy) Mulsanne Racing	13	Ret	15	14					10	DSQ	12†	9	6^{5}	8	20†	DNS	NC	9	Ret	14	8	9	27
7	(Italy) Mulsanne Racing									Ret	DNS	13†	Ret	12	Ret							Ret	DNS	27
6	(Italy) Target Competition	11	6					Ret	9	Ret^{4}	7							14	16	1	6	10	6	66.5
6	(Italy) Target Competition	14	Ret															16	Ret	11	20	14	14	66.5
8	(Finland) LMS Racing											5^{4}	Ret			17	14					23†^{4}	Ret	14
9	(Thailand) Team Eakie BBR Kaiten															6	9							10
10	(Spain) Baporo Motorsport			9	9																			8
10	(Spain) Baporo Motorsport			10	Ret																			8
11	(Italy) Top Run Motorsport	12	8	Ret	Ret											Ret	DNS							6
12	(Netherlands) Ferry Monster Autosport					15	10																	6
12	(Netherlands) Ferry Monster Autosport					Ret	11																	6
13	(Netherlands) Bas Koeten Racing	15	9																					5
13	(Netherlands) Bas Koeten Racing	16	12																					5
14	Team Thailand																			Ret	13	7	12	4
15	(Italy) B.D. Racing							9	11															3
15	(Italy) B.D. Racing							10	12															3
16	(Germany) Kissling Motorsport																	12	11					3
17	(France) Sébastien Loeb Racing					12	12																	2
17	(France) Sébastien Loeb Racing					13	13																	2
18	(Thailand) Kratingdaeng Racing Team															13	12							1
18	(Thailand) Kratingdaeng Racing Team															15	15							1
19	(Hong Kong) FRD Motorsports																	13	12	16	Ret			1
20	(Hong Kong) TeamWork Motorsport																			12	11	17	Ret	1
20	(Hong Kong) TeamWork Motorsport																			17	19	DNQ	DNQ	1
21	(Thailand) Vattana Motorsport															11	Ret							1
21	(Thailand) Vattana Motorsport															Ret	17							1
	(Malaysia) Viper Niza Racing																	Ret	15	15	17	DNQ	DNQ	0
	(Macau) Son Veng Racing Team																	15	DSQ					0
	(Thailand) Sloth Racing															18	16							0
	(Thailand) TBN MK Ihere Racing Team															16	Ret							0
	(Macau) Elegant Racing Team																					16	Ret	0
	(Hong Kong) Roadstar Racing																					DNQ	DNQ	0
	(China) Champ Motorsport																					WD	WD	0
Teams ineligible to score points
	(Hong Kong) Suncity Racing Team																					6	Ret	
	(Hong Kong) Suncity Racing Team																					22	Ret	
	(Macau) Asia Racing Team																					9	13	
	(China) Linky Racing Team																					13	11	
	(China) Linky Racing Team																					21	Ret	
	(Macau) Son Veng Racing Team																					12	16	
	(Hong Kong) Team TRC																					Ret	DNS	
	(China) Star Racing Team																					DNQ	DNQ	
	(Hong Kong) FRD Motorsports																					DNQ	DNQ	
Pos.	Team	BHR (Bahrain)		EST (Portugal)		SPA (Belgium)		IMO (Italy)		SAL (Austria)		OSC (Germany)		SOC (Russia)		BUR (Thailand)		SIN (Singapore)		SEP (Malaysia)		MAC† (Macau)		Pts.

Colour	Result
Gold	Winner
Silver	Second place
Bronze	Third place
Green	Points classification
Blue	Non-points classification
Blue	Non-classified finish (NC)
Purple	Retired, not classified (Ret)
Red	Did not qualify (DNQ)
Red	Did not pre-qualify (DNPQ)
Black	Disqualified (DSQ)
White	Did not start (DNS)
White	Withdrew (WD)
White	Race cancelled (C)
Blank	Did not practice (DNP)
Blank	Did not arrive (DNA)
Blank	Excluded (EX)

**Bold** – Pole
Italics – Fastest Lap

† – Drivers did not finish the race, but were classified as they completed over 75% of the race distance.

=== Model of the year ===
Pos.	Car	BHR (Bahrain)		EST (Portugal)		SPA (Belgium)		IMO (Italy)		SAL (Austria)		OSC (Germany)		SOC (Russia)		BUR (Thailand)		SIN (Singapore)		SEP (Malaysia)		MAC† (Macau)		Pts.
1	SEAT León	1^{1}	1	4^{1}	1	2^{1}	4	2^{2}	2	2^{2}	2	1^{1}	1	2^{2}	3	1^{1}	1	3^{2}	2	3^{2}	2	4^{4}	3	745.5
1	SEAT León	3^{2}	2	5^{5}	4	3^{2}	6	5	5	3^{5}	4	2^{2}	2	8	4	2^{5}	3	4^{4}	3	4^{5}	4	5^{5}	5	745.5
2	Volkswagen Golf GTI TCR	7^{5}	4	2^{3}	2	7^{4}	1	1^{3}	3	5^{1}	1	6^{4}	6	1^{1}	2	4^{3}	4	1^{1}	4	2^{4}	5	1^{1}	2	639.5
2	Volkswagen Golf GTI TCR	9	14†	3^{4}	5	10^{5}	2	3^{4}	4	7	3	8^{5}	8	5^{3}	5	5^{4}	5	2^{3}	6	5	8	2^{2}	4	639.5
3	Honda Civic Type R TCR (FK2)	2^{3}	7	1^{2}	3	1^{3}	5	8^{1}	1	1^{3}	6	7^{3}	10	3^{4}	1	3^{2}	2	8^{5}	1	1^{1}	1	3^{3}	1	589
3	Honda Civic Type R TCR (FK2)	5^{4}	10	7	6	5	8	Ret^{5}	9	4^{4}	7	Ret	12	4	12†	6	9	10	7	8^{3}	3	7	6	589
4	Alfa Romeo Giulietta TCR	13	Ret	15	14					10	DSQ	12†	9	6^{5}	8	20†	DNS	Ret	9	18†	14	8	9	93
4	Alfa Romeo Giulietta TCR									Ret	DNS	13†	Ret	12	Ret							Ret	DNS	93
5	Opel Astra TCR	11	6															12	11					30
5	Opel Astra TCR	14	Ret																					30
6	Peugeot 308 Racing Cup					12	12																	24
6	Peugeot 308 Racing Cup					13	13																	24
7	Subaru Impreza STi TCR	12	8	Ret	Ret											Ret	DNS							12
8	Ford Focus TCR																	13	12	16	DNS			12
Cars ineligible to score points
	Citroen C-Elysée																					6	Ret	
	Citroen C-Elysée																					22	Ret	
	Audi S3 Saloon																					13	11	
	Audi S3 Saloon																					21	Ret	
	Ford Focus TCR																					DNQ	DNQ	
	Mercedes-Benz C260																					DNQ	DNQ	
Pos.	Car	BHR (Bahrain)		EST (Portugal)		SPA (Belgium)		IMO (Italy)		SAL (Austria)		OSC (Germany)		SOC (Russia)		BUR (Thailand)		SIN (Singapore)		SEP (Malaysia)		MAC† (Macau)		Pts.

Colour	Result
Gold	Winner
Silver	Second place
Bronze	Third place
Green	Points classification
Blue	Non-points classification
Blue	Non-classified finish (NC)
Purple	Retired, not classified (Ret)
Red	Did not qualify (DNQ)
Red	Did not pre-qualify (DNPQ)
Black	Disqualified (DSQ)
White	Did not start (DNS)
White	Withdrew (WD)
White	Race cancelled (C)
Blank	Did not practice (DNP)
Blank	Did not arrive (DNA)
Blank	Excluded (EX)

**Bold** – Pole
Italics – Fastest Lap

† – Drivers did not finish the race, but were classified as they completed over 75% of the race distance.

=== OMP Trophy ===
All drivers displaying an OMP are eligible for the OMP Trophy. Points are awarded for championships and the use of OMP safety equipment. At the end of the season, the top four drivers win a cash prize.

Pos	Driver	Manufacturer	Points
1	(United Kingdom) James Nash	SEAT	292
2	(Slovakia) Maťo Homola	SEAT	290
3	(Spain) Pepe Oriola	SEAT	276
4	(Serbia) Dušan Borković	SEAT	276
5	(Italy) Gianni Morbidelli	Honda	222
6	(Russia) Sergey Afanasyev	SEAT	196
7	(Russia) Mikhail Grachev	Volkswagen; Honda	174
8	(Hungary) Attila Tassi	SEAT	150
9	(Georgia (country)) Davit Kajaia	Volkswagen	115
10	(Finland) Aku Pellinen	Honda	84
11	(United States) Kevin Gleason	Honda	45
12	(Spain) Jordi Oriola	Opel; Honda	42
13	(Italy) Luigi Ferrara	Subaru	19
14	(Italy) Michela Cerruti	Alfa Romeo	12
15	(Italy) Andrea Belicchi	Opel	6
