= Kari-Pekka Laaksonen =

Finnish racing driver

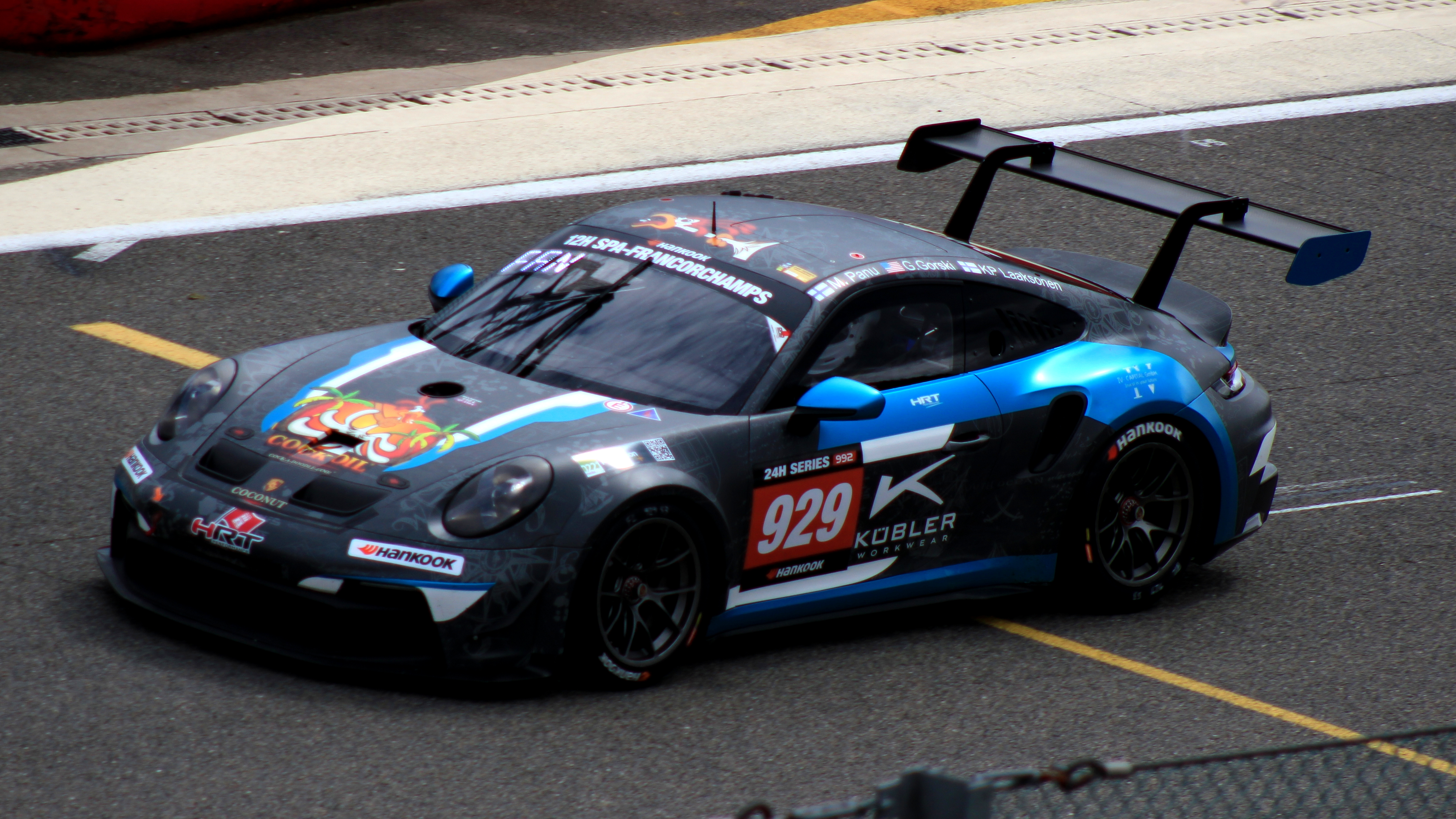
- Nationality: Finnish
- Born: 23 April 1967 (age 59) Valkeakoski, Finland

TCR International Series career
- Debut season: 2016
- Current team: LMS Racing
- Car number: 53
- Starts: 2

Previous series
- 2016 2015 2014 2013-15 2011-12 2010: ADAC TCR German Series; VLN; Porsche Carrera Cup Scandinavia; Porsche GT3 Cup Finland; Finnish Xtreme Race Cup; Finnish V1600 Cup

Kari-Pekka Laaksonen (born 23 April 1967) is a Finnish racing driver currently competing in the TCR International Series. Having previously competed in Porsche Carrera Cup Scandinavia, Porsche GT3 Cup Finland and ADAC TCR Germany Touring Car Championship amongst others.

== Business career ==
Laaksonen has been active in the transport sector throughout his professional career. After graduating Lappeenranta-Lahti University of Technology LUT and a number of management positions, Laaksonen became CEO of Containerships Plc in 2011 and remained at the company when it was integrated into the CMA CGM group. He left the company in June 2019 to join Samskip. The move required Laaksonen to move to Rotterdam where the Samskip headquarters are located.

== Racing career ==
Laaksonen began his career in 2010 in the Finnish V1600 Cup, he finished eighth in the championship standings that year. He switched to the Finnish Xtreme Race Cup in 2011 and finished fourteenth in the championship standings in both 2011 and 2012. In 2013, he switched to the Porsche GT3 Cup Finland series, taking three podiums in his first season in the championship. Continuing in the series in 2014, he took two wins and five podiums, finishing seventh in the championship standings that year. He only entered four races in the series in 2015, but still took one victory and two podiums. He also raced in the 2015 24 Hours of Nürburgring, finishing twelfth in the SP7 class. In 2016, he switched to the all new 2016 ADAC TCR Germany Touring Car Championship.

In August 2016, it was announced that Laaksonen would race in the TCR International Series, driving a SEAT León Cup Racer for LMS Racing.

== Racing record ==
=== Complete TCR International Series results ===
(key) (Races in bold indicate pole position) (Races in italics indicate fastest lap)

Year	Team	Car	1	2	3	4	5	6	7	8	9	10	11	12	13	14	15	16	17	18	19	20	21	22	DC	Points
2016	LMS Racing	SEAT León Cup Racer	BHR; 1	BHR; 2	POR; 1	POR; 2	BEL; 1	BEL; 2	ITA; 1	ITA; 2	AUT; 1	AUT; 2	GER; 1	GER; 2	RUS; 1	RUS; 2	THA; 1; 17	THA; 2; 13	SIN; 1	SIN; 2	MYS; 1	MYS; 2	MAC; 1	MAC; 2	NC	0

=== TCR Spa 500 results ===
Year	Team	Co-Drivers	Car	Class	Laps	Pos.	Class Pos.
2019	(Switzerland) TOPCAR Sport with Bas Koeten Racing	(Spain) Mikel Azcona (Switzerland) Julien Apotheloz (Switzerland) Fabian Danz (Finland) Antti Buri	CUPRA León TCR	**P**	444	**3rd**	**3rd**
