= Kissling Motorsport =

(Germany) Kissling Motorsport
- Founded: 1977
- Folded: 2019
- Team principal(s): Helmut Kissling
- Former series: TCR International Series; VLN; ADAC GT Masters; ADAC Procar Series
- Noted drivers: TCR; 33. (Spain) Jordi Oriola
- Drivers' Championships: 1993 VLN; 1995 STT; 1996 STT; 1997 GT Cup; 2001 VLN; 2003 VLN; 2007 VLN
- Website: http://www.kissling-motorsport.de

Kissling Motorsport was a German auto racing team based in Münstereifel, Euskirchen (district), North Rhine-Westphalia. The team has raced in the multiple series' around the world, as well as having a close cooperation with Opel and Opel Performance Center. Having developed several Opel racing cars, amongst them are the Opel Omega 3000 24V Evo that raced the 1993 Deutsche Tourenwagen Meisterschaft, the Opel Astra TCR that was raced in the 2016 TCR International Series. The team have also developed several Opel Cup car amongst them the Opel Calibra Cup and Opel Astra Cup cars.

On 8 January 2019 it was announced that the team will close down its motorsport activities citing private reasons and the restructuring of Opel under the PSA Group.

== TCR International Series ==
=== Opel Astra TCR (2016) ===
Originally they teamed up with 2015 TCR Teams' Champions Target Competition to run the Opel Astra TCR in 2016. However, following the first round of the championship, Opel and Kissling Motorsport decided to withdraw the car from competition after poor results. The car returned for a one-off reappearance in the series in Singapore with Jordi Oriola again piloting the car, with Kissling Motorsport running the car themselves.
