= 2016 TCR International Series Oschersleben round =

(Germany) 2016 TCR International Series Oschersleben round
Round details
- Round 6 of 11 rounds in the 2016 TCR International Series
- Layout of the Motorsport Arena Oschersleben
- Location: Motorsport Arena Oschersleben, Oschersleben, Germany
- Course: Permanent racing facility 3.696 km (2.297 mi)

TCR International Series

Race 1
- Date: 19 June 2016
- Laps: 19

Pole position
Driver	(Serbia) Dušan Borković	B3 Racing Team Hungary
- Time: 1:34.872

Podium
First	(Slovakia) Maťo Homola	B3 Racing Team Hungary
Second	(Serbia) Dušan Borković	B3 Racing Team Hungary
Third	(United Kingdom) James Nash	Team Craft-Bamboo Lukoil

Fastest lap
Driver	(Slovakia) Maťo Homola	B3 Racing Team Hungary
- Time: 1:36.468 (on lap 8)

Race 2
- Date: 19 June 2016
- Laps: 17

Podium
First	(Spain) Pepe Oriola	Team Craft-Bamboo Lukoil
Second	(Serbia) Dušan Borković	B3 Racing Team Hungary
Third	(United Kingdom) James Nash	Team Craft-Bamboo Lukoil

Fastest lap
Driver	(Serbia) Dušan Borković	B3 Racing Team Hungary
- Time: 1:35.557 (on lap 5)

The 2016 TCR International Series Oschersleben round was the sixth round of the 2016 TCR International Series season. It took place on 18–19 June at the Motorsport Arena Oschersleben.

Maťo Homola won the first race, starting from second position, driving a SEAT León TCR, and Pepe Oriola gained the second one, also driving a SEAT.

== Ballast ==
Due to the results obtained in the previous round, Jean-Karl Vernay received +30 kg, James Nash +20 kg and Mikhail Grachev +10 kg.

== Classification ==
=== Qualifying ===
Pos.	No.	Driver	Car	Team	Q1	Q2	Grid	Points
1	62	(Serbia) Dušan Borković	SEAT León TCR	B3 Racing Team Hungary	1:35.798	1:34.872	1	5
2	70	(Slovakia) Maťo Homola	SEAT León TCR	B3 Racing Team Hungary	1:35.294	1:35.121	2	4
3	54	(United Kingdom) James Nash	SEAT León TCR	(United Kingdom) Team Craft-Bamboo Lukoil	1:35.899	1:35.177	3	3
4	48	(Finland) Antti Buri	SEAT León Cup Racer	(Finland) LMS Racing	1:36.172	1:35.411	4	2
5	77	(Russia) Sergey Afanasyev	SEAT León TCR	(United Kingdom) Team Craft-Bamboo Lukoil	1:35.651	1:35.468	5	1
6	10	(Italy) Gianni Morbidelli	Honda Civic TCR	(Sweden) WestCoast Racing	1:35.953	1:35.499	6	
7	2	(France) Jean-Karl Vernay	Volkswagen Golf GTI TCR	(Luxembourg) Leopard Racing	1:35.729	1:35.545	7	
8	74	(Spain) Pepe Oriola	SEAT León TCR	(United Kingdom) Team Craft-Bamboo Lukoil	1:34.779	1:35.553	8	
9	1	(Switzerland) Stefano Comini	Volkswagen Golf GTI TCR	(Luxembourg) Leopard Racing	1:35.494	1:35.717	9	
10	7	(Georgia (country)) Davit Kajaia	Volkswagen Golf GTI TCR	(Germany) Liqui Moly Team Engstler	1:36.101	1:35.786	10	
11	22	(Czech Republic) Petr Fulín	Alfa Romeo Giulietta TCR	(Italy) Mulsanne Racing	1:36.010	1:36.168	11	
12	9	(Hungary) Attila Tassi	SEAT León TCR	B3 Racing Team Hungary	1:36.110	1:36.328	12	
13	8	(Russia) Mikhail Grachev	Honda Civic TCR	(Sweden) WestCoast Racing	1:36.278		13	
14	46	(Germany) Niklas Mackschin	Volkswagen Golf GTI TCR	(Germany) Liqui Moly Team Engstler	1:36.955		14	
15	47	(United States) Gary Sheehan	Volkswagen Golf GTI TCR	(Germany) Liqui Moly Team Engstler	1:37.395		15	
16	88	(Italy) Michela Cerruti	Alfa Romeo Giulietta TCR	(Italy) Mulsanne Racing	1:38.725		16	

=== Race 1 ===
Pos.	No.	Driver	Car	Team	Laps	Time/Retired	Grid	Points
1	70	(Slovakia) Maťo Homola	SEAT León TCR	B3 Racing Team Hungary	19	34:31.336	2	25
2	62	(Serbia) Dušan Borković	SEAT León TCR	B3 Racing Team Hungary	19	+1.438	1	18
3	54	(United Kingdom) James Nash	SEAT León TCR	(United Kingdom) Team Craft-Bamboo Lukoil	19	+2.383	3	15
4	77	(Russia) Sergey Afanasyev	SEAT León TCR	(United Kingdom) Team Craft-Bamboo Lukoil	19	+3.080	5	12
5	48	(Finland) Antti Buri	SEAT León Cup Racer	(Finland) LMS Racing	19	+3.741	4	10
6	2	(France) Jean-Karl Vernay	Volkswagen Golf GTI TCR	(Luxembourg) Leopard Racing	19	+5.031	7	8
7	10	(Italy) Gianni Morbidelli	Honda Civic TCR	(Sweden) WestCoast Racing	19	+5.533	6	6
8	7	(Georgia (country)) Davit Kajaia	Volkswagen Golf GTI TCR	(Germany) Liqui Moly Team Engstler	19	+11.085	10	4
9	46	(Germany) Niklas Mackschin	Volkswagen Golf GTI TCR	(Germany) Liqui Moly Team Engstler	19	+11.562	14	2
10	74	(Spain) Pepe Oriola	SEAT León TCR	(United Kingdom) Team Craft-Bamboo Lukoil	19	+26.593	8	1
11	47	(United States) Gary Sheehan	Volkswagen Golf GTI TCR	(Germany) Liqui Moly Team Engstler	17	Spun out	15	
12	88	(Italy) Michela Cerruti	Alfa Romeo Giulietta TCR	(Italy) Mulsanne Racing	16	Technical	16	
13	22	(Czech Republic) Petr Fulín	Alfa Romeo Giulietta TCR	(Italy) Mulsanne Racing	15	Technical	11	
Ret	8	(Russia) Mikhail Grachev	Honda Civic TCR	(Sweden) WestCoast Racing	12	Technical	13	
Ret	1	(Switzerland) Stefano Comini	Volkswagen Golf GTI TCR	(Luxembourg) Leopard Racing	11	Radiator	9	
DSQ	9	(Hungary) Attila Tassi	SEAT León TCR	B3 Racing Team Hungary	9	Retired	12	

=== Race 2 ===
Pos.	No.	Driver	Car	Team	Laps	Time/Retired	Grid	Points
1	74	(Spain) Pepe Oriola	SEAT León TCR	(United Kingdom) Team Craft-Bamboo Lukoil	17	27:32.124	2	25
2	62	(Serbia) Dušan Borković	SEAT León TCR	B3 Racing Team Hungary	17	+2.164	9	18
3	54	(United Kingdom) James Nash	SEAT León TCR	(United Kingdom) Team Craft-Bamboo Lukoil	17	+5.928	7	15
4	77	(Russia) Sergey Afanasyev	SEAT León TCR	(United Kingdom) Team Craft-Bamboo Lukoil	17	+7.881	5	12
5	70	(Slovakia) Maťo Homola	SEAT León TCR	B3 Racing Team Hungary	17	+12.375	8	10
6	1	(Switzerland) Stefano Comini	Volkswagen Golf GTI TCR	(Luxembourg) Leopard Racing	17	+15.413	15	8
7	9	(Hungary) Attila Tassi	SEAT León TCR	B3 Racing Team Hungary	17	+17.703	11	6
8	46	(Germany) Niklas Mackschin	Volkswagen Golf GTI TCR	(Germany) Liqui Moly Team Engstler	17	+17.954	13	4
9	88	(Italy) Michela Cerruti	Alfa Romeo Giulietta TCR	(Italy) Mulsanne Racing	17	+21.470	14	2
10	10	(Italy) Gianni Morbidelli	Honda Civic TCR	(Sweden) WestCoast Racing	17	+23.274	4	1
11	47	(United States) Gary Sheehan	Volkswagen Golf GTI TCR	(Germany) Liqui Moly Team Engstler	17	+40.115	16	
12	8	(Russia) Mikhail Grachev	Honda Civic TCR	(Sweden) WestCoast Racing	15	+2 laps	12	
Ret	7	(Georgia (country)) Davit Kajaia	Volkswagen Golf GTI TCR	(Germany) Liqui Moly Team Engstler	10	Suspension	1	
Ret	48	(Finland) Antti Buri	SEAT León Cup Racer	(Finland) LMS Racing	1	Puncture	6	
Ret	22	(Czech Republic) Petr Fulín	Alfa Romeo Giulietta TCR	(Italy) Mulsanne Racing	1	Collision	10	
Ret	2	(France) Jean-Karl Vernay	Volkswagen Golf GTI TCR	(Luxembourg) Leopard Racing	1	Collision	3	

== Standings after the event ==
Drivers' Championship standings

	Pos	Driver	Points
1	1	(Spain) Pepe Oriola	145
1	2	(United Kingdom) James Nash	145
3	3	(Slovakia) Maťo Homola	141
3	4	(Switzerland) Stefano Comini	128
1	5	(France) Jean-Karl Vernay	115

Model of the Year standings

	Pos	Car	Points
	1	SEAT León	443
	2	Volkswagen Golf GTI TCR	367
	3	Honda Civic TCR	298
1	4	Alfa Romeo Giulietta TCR	44
1	5	Peugeot 308 Racing Cup	24

Teams' Championship standings

	Pos	Driver	Points
	1	(United Kingdom) Team Craft-Bamboo Lukoil	361
2	2	B3 Racing Team Hungary	263
1	3	(Sweden) WestCoast Racing	258
1	4	(Luxembourg) Leopard Racing	251
	5	(Germany) Liqui Moly Team Engstler	99

- Note: Only the top five positions are included for both sets of drivers' standings.
