= Jordi Oriola =

Spanish racing driver (born 1996)

- Nationality: Spanish
- Full name: Jordi Oriola Vila
- Born: 21 June 1996 (age 30) Barcelona, Spain
- Relatives: Pepe Oriola (brother)

SEAT León Eurocup career
- Debut season: 2014
- Current team: Target Competition
- Car number: 33
- Former teams: PCR Sport
- Starts: 20

Previous series
- 2015 2013 2012 2007-11: TCR International Series; ETCC; SEAT León Supercopa France; Karting

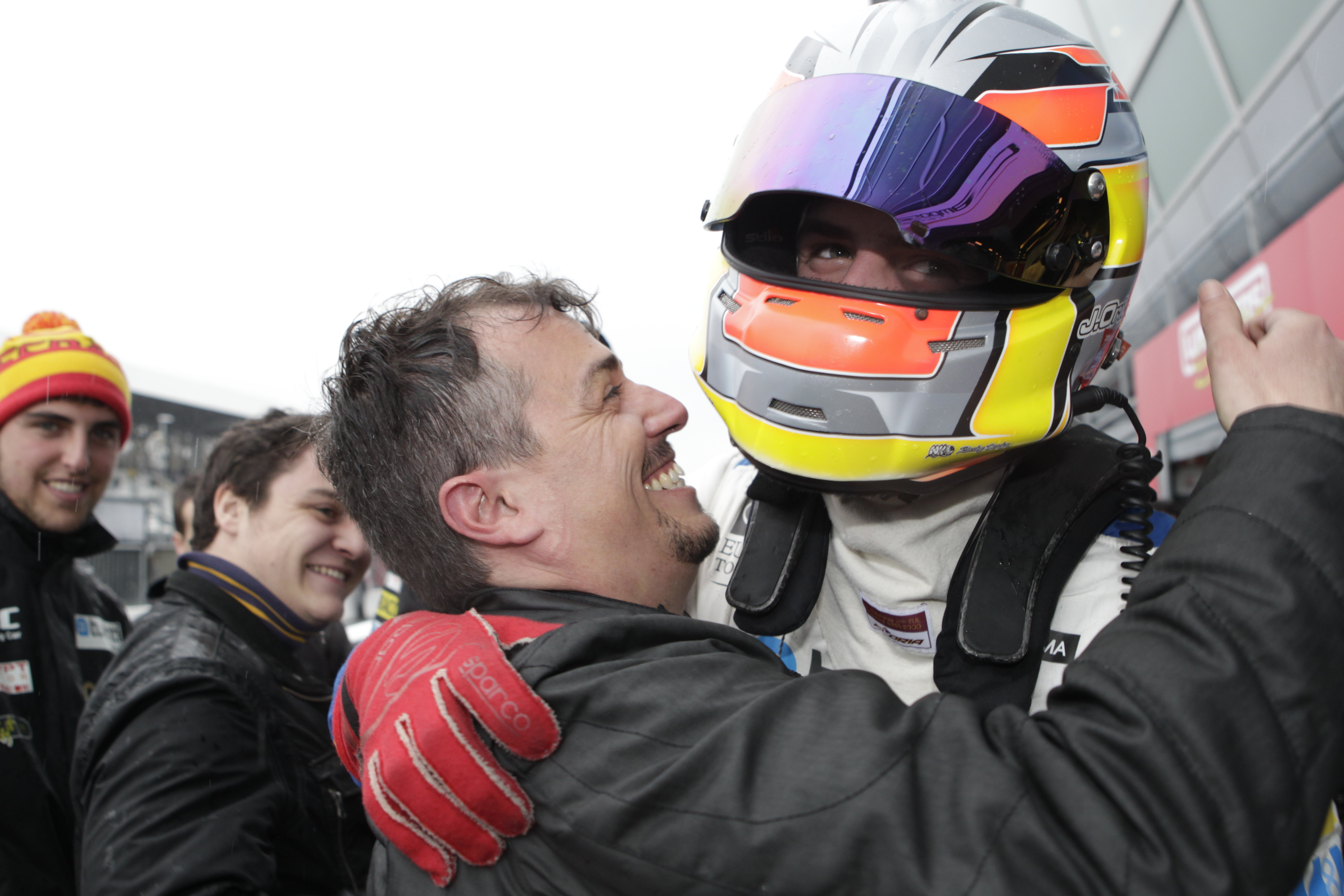

Jordi Oriola Vila (born 21 June 1996) is a Spanish racing driver currently competing in the SEAT León Eurocup. He previously competed in the TCR International Series and European Touring Car Cup.

== Racing career ==
Oriola began his career in 2007 in karting. After karting for four years, he switched to the SEAT León Supercopa France in 2012, he finished 12th in the championship standings that year. In 2013, he switched to the European Touring Car Cup, racing in the Single-makes Trophy. He finished third in the championship standings, with two wins, one pole position and five podiums. In March 2015, it was announced that Oriola would make his TCR International Series debut with Campos Racing driving an Opel Astra OPC. Since 2014, Oriola has been competing in the SEAT León Eurocup.

== Racing record ==
=== Career summary ===
Season	Series	Team	Races	Wins	Poles	F/Laps	Podiums	Points	Position
2012	SEAT Leon Supercopa France	Monlau Competicion	8	0	0	0	0	62	12th
2013	European Touring Car Cup - Single-Make Trophy	Tuenti Racing Team	10	2	1	0	5	54	**3rd**
2013	Mitjet 2L		2	0	0	0	0	68	57th
2014	SEAT León Eurocup	PCR Sport	12	0	0	0	0	20	9th
2015	SEAT León Eurocup	Target Competition	14	0	0	0	3	37	6th
2015	TCR International Series	Campos Racing	2	0	0	0	0	14	19th
2015	TCR International Series	Target Competition	2	0	0	0	0	14	19th
2016	ADAC TCR Germany Touring Car Championship	DG Sport Compétition	2	0	0	1	1	0	NC†
2016	TCR Trophy Europe	DG Sport Compétition	1	0	0	0	0	12	27th
2016	TCR International Series	Target Competition	6	0	0	1	0	17	17th
2016	TCR International Series	Kissling Motorsport	2	0	0	0	0	17	17th
2016	TCR International Series	Liqui Moly Team Engstler	0	0	0	0	0	17	17th
2018	TCR Middle East Series	Pit Lane Competizioni	5	0	0	0	0	38	8th

† As Oriola was a guest driver, he was ineligible to score points.

=== Complete TCR International Series results ===
(key) (Races in bold indicate pole position) (Races in italics indicate fastest lap)

Year	Team	Car	1	2	3	4	5	6	7	8	9	10	11	12	13	14	15	16	17	18	19	20	21	22	DC	Points
2015	Campos Racing	Opel Astra OPC	SEP; 1 DNS	SEP; 2 DNS	SHA; 1 WD	SHA; 2 WD	VAL; 1 NC	VAL; 2 Ret	ALG; 1	ALG; 2	MNZ; 1	MNZ; 2	SAL; 1	SAL; 2	SOC; 1	SOC; 2	RBR; 1	RBR; 2	MRN; 1	MRN; 2	CHA; 1	CHA; 2			19th	14
2015	Target Competition	SEAT León Cup Racer																					MAC; 1; 5	MAC; 2; 8†	19th	14
2016	Target Competition	Opel Astra TCR	BHR; 1; 11	BHR; 2; 6	EST; 1	EST; 2	SPA; 1	SPA; 2																	17th	17
2016	Target Competition	Honda Civic TCR							IMO; 1 Ret	IMO; 2; 9	SAL; 1 Ret	SAL; 2; 7	OSC; 1	OSC; 2	SOC; 1	SOC; 2	CHA; 1	CHA; 2							17th	17
2016	Kissling Motorsport	Opel Astra TCR																	MRN; 1; 12	MRN; 2; 11	SEP; 1	SEP; 2			17th	17
2016	Liqui Moly Team Engstler	Volkswagen Golf GTI TCR																					MAC; 1 WD	MAC; 2 WD	17th	17

^{†} Driver did not finish the race, but was classified as he completed over 75% of the race distance.
