= Aku Pellinen =

Finnish racing driver

- Nationality: Finnish
- Born: 17 May 1993 (age 33) Tampere, Finland

TCR International Series career
- Debut season: 2016
- Current team: WestCoast Racing
- Car number: 14
- Starts: 6
- Wins: 1

Previous series
- 2015 2015 2014 2014 2013 2012-13 2011-12 2009-10 2008: Porsche Supercup; Porsche Carrera Cup Italy; SEAT León Eurocup; European Touring Car Cup; Formula Abarth; Italian SEAT Ibiza Cup; Trofeo Abarth 500 Europe; Finnish V1600 Cup; Karting

Championship titles
- 2012 2010: Trofeo Abarth 500 Europe; Finnish V1600 Cup

Aku Pellinen (born 17 May 1993) is a Finnish racing driver currently competing in the TCR International Series. Having previously competed in the European Touring Car Cup and Porsche Carrera Cup Italy amongst others.

== Racing career ==
Pellinen began his career in 2000 in karting. He switched to the Finnish V1600 Cup for 2009, winning the championship in 2010. He then went on to compete in the Trofeo Abarth 500 Europe series in 2011, taking the title in 2012. He switched to the Italian SEAT Ibiza Cup for 2013 having raced a single weekend in the championship in 2012, he finished third in the championship standings in 2013. He also raced a single weekend in Formula Abarth that year. In 2014, he took four victories, four podiums, four fastest laps and one pole position on his way to finishing third in the European Touring Car Cup. He also made a guest appearance in the SEAT León Eurocup series in 2014. He switched to the Porsche Carrera Cup Italy series in 2015, finishing seventh in the championship standings. That year, he also raced two weekends in the Porsche Supercup.

In March 2016, it was announced that Pellinen would race in the TCR International Series, driving a Honda Civic TCR for WestCoast Racing.

== Racing record ==
=== Complete TCR International Series results ===
(key) (Races in bold indicate pole position) (Races in italics indicate fastest lap)

Year	Team	Car	1	2	3	4	5	6	7	8	9	10	11	12	13	14	15	16	17	18	19	20	21	22	DC	Points
2016	WestCoast Racing	Honda Civic TCR	BHR; 1; 5	BHR; 2; 10	POR; 1; 7	POR; 2; 6	BEL; 1; 1	BEL; 2; 5	ITA; 1	ITA; 2	AUT; 1	AUT; 2	GER; 1	GER; 2	RUS; 1	RUS; 2	THA; 1	THA; 2	SIN; 1	SIN; 2	MYS; 1	MYS; 2	MAC; 1	MAC; 2	12th	63

^{†} Driver did not finish the race, but was classified as he completed over 75% of the race distance.
