= 2016 TCR International Series Sepang round =

(Malaysia) 2016 TCR International Series Sepang round
Round details
- Round 10 of 11 rounds in the 2016 TCR International Series
- Layout of the Sepang International Circuit
- Location: Sepang International Circuit, Kuala Lumpur, Malaysia
- Course: Permanent racing facility 5.543 km (3.445 mi)

TCR International Series

Race 1
- Date: 30 September 2016
- Laps: 11

Pole position
Driver	(Italy) Roberto Colciago	Target Competition
- Time: 2:15.021

Podium
First	(Italy) Roberto Colciago	Target Competition
Second	(Switzerland) Stefano Comini	Leopard Racing
Third	(United Kingdom) James Nash	Team Craft-Bamboo Lukoil

Fastest lap
Driver	(Switzerland) Stefano Comini	Leopard Racing
- Time: 2:17.268 (on lap 4)

Race 2
- Date: 1 October 2016
- Laps: 10

Podium
First	(United States) Kevin Gleason	WestCoast Racing
Second	(United Kingdom) James Nash	Team Craft-Bamboo Lukoil
Third	(Italy) Gianni Morbidelli	WestCoast Racing

Fastest lap
Driver	(Switzerland) Stefano Comini	Leopard Racing
- Time: 2:17.196 (on lap 2)

The 2016 TCR International Series Sepang round was the tenth round of the 2016 TCR International Series season. It took place on 29 September–1 October at the Sepang International Circuit.

Roberto Colciago won the first race, starting from pole position and Kevin Gleason gained the second one, both driving a Honda Civic TCR.

== Ballast ==
Due to the results obtained in the previous round, Jean-Karl Vernay received +30 kg, Stefano Comini +20 kg and Maťo Homola +10 kg.

== Classification ==
=== Qualifying ===
Pos.	No.	Driver	Car	Team	Q1 (Note: Q2 was not held at this round, due to the Formula One timetable constraints and the limited track time)	Grid	Points
1	5	(Italy) Roberto Colciago	Honda Civic TCR	(Italy) Target Competition	2:15.021	1	5
2	74	(Spain) Pepe Oriola	SEAT León TCR	(United Kingdom) Team Craft-Bamboo Lukoil	2:15.086	2	4
3	8	(Russia) Mikhail Grachev	Honda Civic TCR	(Sweden) WestCoast Racing	2:15.155	3	3
4	2	(France) Jean-Karl Vernay	Volkswagen Golf GTI TCR	(Luxembourg) Leopard Racing	2:15.296	4	2
5	70	(Slovakia) Maťo Homola	SEAT León TCR	B3 Racing Team Hungary	2:15.310	5	1
6	1	(Switzerland) Stefano Comini	Volkswagen Golf GTI TCR	(Luxembourg) Leopard Racing	2:15.311	6	
7	10	(Italy) Gianni Morbidelli	Honda Civic TCR	(Sweden) WestCoast Racing	2:15.476	7	
8	54	(United Kingdom) James Nash	SEAT León TCR	(United Kingdom) Team Craft-Bamboo Lukoil	2:15.646	8	
9	24	(United States) Kevin Gleason	Honda Civic TCR	(Sweden) WestCoast Racing	2:15.945	9	
10	83	(Thailand) Tin Sritrai	Honda Civic TCR	Team Thailand	2:16.006	10	
11	62	(Serbia) Dušan Borković	SEAT León TCR	B3 Racing Team Hungary	2:16.026	11	
12	77	(Russia) Sergey Afanasyev	SEAT León TCR	(United Kingdom) Team Craft-Bamboo Lukoil	2:16.031	12	
13	9	(Hungary) Attila Tassi	SEAT León TCR	B3 Racing Team Hungary	2:16.128	13	
14	50	(Netherlands) Loris Hezemans	SEAT León TCR	(Italy) Target Competition	2:16.139	14	
15	3	(Hong Kong) Andy Yan	Volkswagen Golf GTI TCR	(Germany) Liqui Moly Team Engstler	2:17.136	15	
16	7	(Georgia (country)) Davit Kajaia	Volkswagen Golf GTI TCR	(Germany) Liqui Moly Team Engstler	2:17.489	16	
17	28	(Macau) Kevin Tse	Volkswagen Golf GTI TCR	(Hong Kong) TeamWork Motorsport	2:17.540	17	
18	68	(Macau) Filipe de Souza	Volkswagen Golf GTI TCR	(Germany) Liqui Moly Team Engstler	2:17.979	18	
19	72	(Netherlands) Nicky Pastorelli	Ford Focus TCR	(Hong Kong) FRD Motorsports	2:18.974	19	
20	20	(Italy) Mario Ferraris	Alfa Romeo Giulietta TCR	(Italy) Mulsanne Racing	2:19.337	20	
21	27	(Hong Kong) William O'Brien	Volkswagen Golf GTI TCR	(Hong Kong) TeamWork Motorsport	2:20.738	21	
22	65	(Malaysia) Douglas Khoo	SEAT León TCR	(Malaysia) Viper Niza Racing	2:20.987	22	
23	35	(France) Rafaël Galiana	Honda Civic TCR	(Italy) Target Competition	2:29.843	23^{1}	

- ^1 — Rafaël Galiana were moved to the back of the grid for having not set a time within the 107% limit.

=== Race 1 ===
Pos.	No.	Driver	Car	Team	Laps	Time/Retired	Grid	Points
1	5	(Italy) Roberto Colciago	Honda Civic TCR	(Italy) Target Competition	11	26:46.089	1	25
2	1	(Switzerland) Stefano Comini	Volkswagen Golf GTI TCR	(Luxembourg) Leopard Racing	11	+0.176	6	18
3	54	(United Kingdom) James Nash	SEAT León TCR	(United Kingdom) Team Craft-Bamboo Lukoil	11	+4.341	8	15
4	74	(Spain) Pepe Oriola	SEAT León TCR	(United Kingdom) Team Craft-Bamboo Lukoil	11	+5.111	2	12
5	2	(France) Jean-Karl Vernay	Volkswagen Golf GTI TCR	(Luxembourg) Leopard Racing	11	+6.392	4	10
6	62	(Serbia) Dušan Borković	SEAT León TCR	B3 Racing Team Hungary	11	+7.445	11	8
7	9	(Hungary) Attila Tassi	SEAT León TCR	B3 Racing Team Hungary	11	+8.085	13	6
8	24	(United States) Kevin Gleason	Honda Civic TCR	(Sweden) WestCoast Racing	11	+8.558	9	4
9	77	(Russia) Sergey Afanasyev	SEAT León TCR	(United Kingdom) Team Craft-Bamboo Lukoil	11	+10.570	12	2
10	70	(Slovakia) Maťo Homola	SEAT León TCR	B3 Racing Team Hungary	11	+10.972	5	1
11	50	(Netherlands) Loris Hezemans	SEAT León TCR	(Italy) Target Competition	11	+11.994	14	
12	28	(Macau) Kevin Tse	Volkswagen Golf GTI TCR	(Hong Kong) TeamWork Motorsport	11	+17.978	17	
13	3	(Hong Kong) Andy Yan	Volkswagen Golf GTI TCR	(Germany) Liqui Moly Team Engstler	11	+22.366	15	
14	68	(Macau) Filipe de Souza	Volkswagen Golf GTI TCR	(Germany) Liqui Moly Team Engstler	11	+23.523	18	
15	65	(Malaysia) Douglas Khoo	SEAT León TCR	(Malaysia) Viper Niza Racing	11	+40.393	22	
16	72	(Netherlands) Nicky Pastorelli	Ford Focus TCR	(Hong Kong) FRD Motorsports	11	+60.279	19	
17	27	(Hong Kong) William O'Brien	Volkswagen Golf GTI TCR	(Hong Kong) TeamWork Motorsport	11	+62.633	21	
Ret	20	(Italy) Mario Ferraris	Alfa Romeo Giulietta TCR	(Italy) Mulsanne Racing	9	Technical	20	
Ret	8	(Russia) Mikhail Grachev	Honda Civic TCR	(Sweden) WestCoast Racing	6	Collision	3	
Ret	83	(Thailand) Tin Sritrai	Honda Civic TCR	Team Thailand	4	Power steering	10	
Ret	7	(Georgia (country)) Davit Kajaia	Volkswagen Golf GTI TCR	(Germany) Liqui Moly Team Engstler	0	Collision	16	
DNS	10	(Italy) Gianni Morbidelli	Honda Civic TCR	(Sweden) WestCoast Racing		Power steering	7	
DNS	35	(France) Rafaël Galiana	Honda Civic TCR	(Italy) Target Competition		Power steering	23	

=== Race 2 ===
Pos.	No.	Driver	Car	Team	Laps	Time/Retired	Grid	Points
1	24	(United States) Kevin Gleason	Honda Civic TCR	(Sweden) WestCoast Racing	10	24:37.307	2	25
2	54	(United Kingdom) James Nash	SEAT León TCR	(United Kingdom) Team Craft-Bamboo Lukoil	10	+1.735	3	18
3	10	(Italy) Gianni Morbidelli	Honda Civic TCR	(Sweden) WestCoast Racing	10	+2.421	4	15
4	62	(Serbia) Dušan Borković	SEAT León TCR	B3 Racing Team Hungary	10	+7.961	11	12
5	2	(France) Jean-Karl Vernay	Volkswagen Golf GTI TCR	(Luxembourg) Leopard Racing	10	+9.853	7	10
6	50	(Netherlands) Loris Hezemans	SEAT León TCR	(Italy) Target Competition	10	+10.241	14	8
7	77	(Russia) Sergey Afanasyev	SEAT León TCR	(United Kingdom) Team Craft-Bamboo Lukoil	10	+10.850	12	6
8	3	(Hong Kong) Andy Yan	Volkswagen Golf GTI TCR	(Germany) Liqui Moly Team Engstler	10	+10.860	15	4
9	9	(Hungary) Attila Tassi	SEAT León TCR	B3 Racing Team Hungary	10	+11.125	13	2
10	7	(Georgia (country)) Davit Kajaia	Volkswagen Golf GTI TCR	(Germany) Liqui Moly Team Engstler	10	+11.800	16	1
11	28	(Macau) Kevin Tse	Volkswagen Golf GTI TCR	(Hong Kong) TeamWork Motorsport	10	+13.714	17	
12	74	(Spain) Pepe Oriola	SEAT León TCR	(United Kingdom) Team Craft-Bamboo Lukoil	10	+14.753	9	
13	83	(Thailand) Tin Sritrai	Honda Civic TCR	Team Thailand	10	+15.046	1	
14	20	(Italy) Mario Ferraris	Alfa Romeo Giulietta TCR	(Italy) Mulsanne Racing	10	+15.404	20	
15	68	(Macau) Filipe de Souza	Volkswagen Golf GTI TCR	(Germany) Liqui Moly Team Engstler	10	+16.610	18	
16	70	(Slovakia) Maťo Homola	SEAT León TCR	B3 Racing Team Hungary	10	+20.513^{2}	6	
17	65	(Malaysia) Douglas Khoo	SEAT León TCR	(Malaysia) Viper Niza Racing	10	+24.595	22	
18	1	(Switzerland) Stefano Comini	Volkswagen Golf GTI TCR	(Luxembourg) Leopard Racing	10	+31.214^{3}	5	
19	27	(Hong Kong) William O'Brien	Volkswagen Golf GTI TCR	(Hong Kong) TeamWork Motorsport	10	+36.238	21	
20	35	(France) Rafaël Galiana	Honda Civic TCR	(Italy) Target Competition	10	+46.183	23	
Ret	8	(Russia) Mikhail Grachev	Honda Civic TCR	(Sweden) WestCoast Racing	6	Collision	8	
Ret	5	(Italy) Roberto Colciago	Honda Civic TCR	(Italy) Target Competition	5	Collision	10	
DNS	72	(Netherlands) Nicky Pastorelli	Ford Focus TCR	(Hong Kong) FRD Motorsports		Engine	19	

- ^2 — Maťo Homola was given a 10-second penalty for causing an collision with Pepe Oriola.
- ^3 — Stefano Comini was given a 30-second penalty for causing an collision with Tin Sritrai.

== Standings after the event ==
Drivers' Championship standings

Pos	Driver	Points
1	(United Kingdom) James Nash	262
2	(Switzerland) Stefano Comini	245
3	(Spain) Pepe Oriola	229
4	(France) Jean-Karl Vernay	223
5	(Slovakia) Maťo Homola	175

Model of the Year standings

Pos	Car	Points
1	SEAT León	719
2	Volkswagen Golf GTI TCR	594
3	Honda Civic TCR	558
4	Alfa Romeo Giulietta TCR	87
5	Opel Astra TCR	30

Teams' Championship standings

Pos	Driver	Points
1	(United Kingdom) Team Craft-Bamboo Lukoil	580
2	(Luxembourg) Leopard Racing	476
3	(Sweden) WestCoast Racing	439
4	B3 Racing Team Hungary	404
5	(Germany) Liqui Moly Team Engstler	129

- Note: Only the top five positions are included for both sets of drivers' standings.
