= 2016 TCR International Series Singapore round =

Round details
- Round 9 of 11 rounds in the 2016 TCR International Series
- Layout of the Marina Bay Street Circuit
- Location: Marina Bay Street Circuit, Marina Bay, Singapore
- Course: Permanent racing facility 5.065 km (3.147 mi)

TCR International Series

Race 1
- Date: 17 September 2016
- Laps: 10

Pole position
Driver	(France) Jean-Karl Vernay	Leopard Racing
- Time: 2:24.511

Podium
First	(France) Jean-Karl Vernay	Leopard Racing
Second	(Switzerland) Stefano Comini	Leopard Racing
Third	(Spain) Pepe Oriola	Team Craft-Bamboo Lukoil

Fastest lap
Driver	(France) Jean-Karl Vernay	Leopard Racing
- Time: 2:25.954 (on lap 6)

Race 2
- Date: 18 September 2016
- Laps: 9

Podium
First	(Russia) Mikhail Grachev	WestCoast Racing
Second	(Serbia) Dušan Borković	B3 Racing Team Hungary
Third	(United Kingdom) James Nash	Team Craft-Bamboo Lukoil

Fastest lap
Driver	(Russia) Mikhail Grachev	WestCoast Racing
- Time: 2:27.637 (on lap 6)

The 2016 TCR International Series Singapore round was the ninth round of the 2016 TCR International Series season. It took place on 16–18 September at the Marina Bay Street Circuit.

Jean-Karl Vernay won the first race, starting from pole position driving a Volkswagen Golf GTI TCR and Mikhail Grachev gained the second one, driving a Honda Civic TCR.

== Ballast ==
Due to the results obtained in the previous round, James Nash received +30 kg, Pepe Oriola +20 kg and Stefano Comini +10 kg.

In addition, the Balance of Performance was reviewed for this round: the returning Opel Astra TCR received +30 kg in ballast and the engine power was limited to 95%.

== Classification ==
=== Qualifying ===
Pos.	No.	Driver	Car	Team	Q1 (Note: Q2 was not held at this round, due to the Formula One timetable constraints and the limited track time)	Grid	Points
1	2	(France) Jean-Karl Vernay	Volkswagen Golf GTI TCR	(Luxembourg) Leopard Racing	2:24.511	1	5
2	70	(Slovakia) Maťo Homola	SEAT León TCR	B3 Racing Team Hungary	2:25.019	2	4
3	1	(Switzerland) Stefano Comini	Volkswagen Golf GTI TCR	(Luxembourg) Leopard Racing	2:25.115	3	3
4	10	(Italy) Gianni Morbidelli	Honda Civic TCR	(Sweden) WestCoast Racing	2:25.389^{1}	9^{2}	2
5	74	(Spain) Pepe Oriola	SEAT León TCR	(United Kingdom) Team Craft-Bamboo Lukoil	2:25.887^{1}	4	1
6	54	(United Kingdom) James Nash	SEAT León TCR	(United Kingdom) Team Craft-Bamboo Lukoil	2:25.899	5	
7	9	(Hungary) Attila Tassi	SEAT León TCR	B3 Racing Team Hungary	2:26.033	6	
8	77	(Russia) Sergey Afanasyev	SEAT León TCR	(United Kingdom) Team Craft-Bamboo Lukoil	2:26.059	7	
9	62	(Serbia) Dušan Borković	SEAT León TCR	B3 Racing Team Hungary	2:26.253^{1}	8	
10	8	(Russia) Mikhail Grachev	Honda Civic TCR	(Sweden) WestCoast Racing	2:26.594	18	
11	24	(United States) Kevin Gleason	Honda Civic TCR	(Sweden) WestCoast Racing	2:26.930^{1}	10^{3}	
12	22	(Czech Republic) Petr Fulín	Alfa Romeo Giulietta TCR	(Italy) Mulsanne Racing	2:27.402^{1}	15^{2}	
13	33	(Spain) Jordi Oriola	Opel Astra TCR	(Germany) Kissling Motorsport	2:28.306^{1}	13^{3}	
14	7	(Georgia (country)) Davit Kajaia	Volkswagen Golf GTI TCR	(Germany) Liqui Moly Team Engstler	2:28.479^{1}	16^{2}	
15	35	(France) Rafaël Galiana	Honda Civic TCR	(Italy) Target Competition	2:28.572^{1}	11	
16	68	(Macau) Filipe de Souza	Volkswagen Golf GTI TCR	(Germany) Liqui Moly Team Engstler	2:29.040	12	
17	99	(China) Martin Cao	Ford Focus TCR	(Hong Kong) FRD Motorsports	2:30.226^{1}	17^{2}	
18	64	(China) Neric Wei	Volkswagen Golf GTI TCR	(Macau) Son Veng Racing Team	2:33.696^{1}	14	
19	65	(Malaysia) Douglas Khoo	SEAT León TCR	(Malaysia) Viper Niza Racing	2:36.246^{1}	19^{4}	
20	50	(Netherlands) Loris Hezemans	SEAT León TCR	(Italy) Target Competition	No time	20^{4}	

- ^1 — Davit Kajaia, Gianni Morbidelli, Petr Fulín, Kevin Gleason, Jordi Oriola, Rafaël Galiana, Dušan Borković, Neric Wei, Douglas Khoo, Pepe Oriola and Martin Cao all had their fastest laptimes removed for not respecting the track limits.
- ^2 — Davit Kajaia, Gianni Morbidelli, Petr Fulín and Martin Cao all received a 6 place grid penalties for not respecting the track limits during qualifying.
- ^3 — Kevin Gleason and Jordi Oriola both received a 3 place grid penalties for not respecting the track limits during qualifying.
- ^4 — Douglas Khoo and Loris Hezemans were moved to the back of the grid for having not set a time within the 107% limit.

=== Race 1 ===
Pos.	No.	Driver	Car	Team	Laps	Time/Retired	Grid	Points
1	2	(France) Jean-Karl Vernay	Volkswagen Golf GTI TCR	(Luxembourg) Leopard Racing	10	24:33.044	1	25
2	1	(Switzerland) Stefano Comini	Volkswagen Golf GTI TCR	(Luxembourg) Leopard Racing	10	+3.132	3	18
3	74	(Spain) Pepe Oriola	SEAT León TCR	(United Kingdom) Team Craft-Bamboo Lukoil	10	+7.101	4	15
4	70	(Slovakia) Maťo Homola	SEAT León TCR	B3 Racing Team Hungary	10	+9.688	2	12
5	54	(United Kingdom) James Nash	SEAT León TCR	(United Kingdom) Team Craft-Bamboo Lukoil	10	+11.570	5	10
6	77	(Russia) Sergey Afanasyev	SEAT León TCR	(United Kingdom) Team Craft-Bamboo Lukoil	10	+12.589	7	8
7	62	(Serbia) Dušan Borković	SEAT León TCR	B3 Racing Team Hungary	10	+13.489	8	6
8	24	(United States) Kevin Gleason	Honda Civic TCR	(Sweden) WestCoast Racing	10	+15.735	10	4
9	9	(Hungary) Attila Tassi	SEAT León TCR	B3 Racing Team Hungary	10	+17.835	6	2
10	10	(Italy) Gianni Morbidelli	Honda Civic TCR	(Sweden) WestCoast Racing	10	+18.264	9	1
11	8	(Russia) Mikhail Grachev	Honda Civic TCR	(Sweden) WestCoast Racing	10	+18.873	18	
12	33	(Spain) Jordi Oriola	Opel Astra TCR	(Germany) Kissling Motorsport	10	+42.029	13	
13	99	(China) Martin Cao	Ford Focus TCR	(Hong Kong) FRD Motorsports	10	+49.346	17	
14	35	(France) Rafaël Galiana	Honda Civic TCR	(Italy) Target Competition	10	+88.099	11	
15	64	(China) Neric Wei	Volkswagen Golf GTI TCR	(Macau) Son Veng Racing Team	10	+139.332	14	
16	50	(Netherlands) Loris Hezemans	SEAT León TCR	(Italy) Target Competition	8	Accident	20	
17	7	(Georgia (country)) Davit Kajaia	Volkswagen Golf GTI TCR	(Germany) Liqui Moly Team Engstler	7	Technical	16	
Ret	65	(Malaysia) Douglas Khoo	SEAT León TCR	(Malaysia) Viper Niza Racing	6	Accident	19	
NC	22	(Czech Republic) Petr Fulín	Alfa Romeo Giulietta TCR	(Italy) Mulsanne Racing	6	+4 laps	15	
Ret	68	(Macau) Filipe de Souza	Volkswagen Golf GTI TCR	(Germany) Liqui Moly Team Engstler	5	Technical	12	

=== Race 2 ===
Pos.	No.	Driver	Car	Team	Laps	Time/Retired	Grid	Points
1	8	(Russia) Mikhail Grachev	Honda Civic TCR	(Sweden) WestCoast Racing	9	+25:55.217	1	25
2	62	(Serbia) Dušan Borković	SEAT León TCR	B3 Racing Team Hungary	9	+0.456	2	18
3	54	(United Kingdom) James Nash	SEAT León TCR	(United Kingdom) Team Craft-Bamboo Lukoil	9	+0.751	5	15
4	1	(Switzerland) Stefano Comini	Volkswagen Golf GTI TCR	(Luxembourg) Leopard Racing	9	+0.903	8	12
5	70	(Slovakia) Maťo Homola	SEAT León TCR	B3 Racing Team Hungary	9	+1.423	9	10
6	2	(France) Jean-Karl Vernay	Volkswagen Golf GTI TCR	(Luxembourg) Leopard Racing	9	+1.631	10	8
7	10	(Italy) Gianni Morbidelli	Honda Civic TCR	(Sweden) WestCoast Racing	9	+2.423	7	6
8	7	(Georgia (country)) Davit Kajaia	Volkswagen Golf GTI TCR	(Germany) Liqui Moly Team Engstler	9	+3.070	14	4
9	22	(Czech Republic) Petr Fulín	Alfa Romeo Giulietta TCR	(Italy) Mulsanne Racing	9	+3.567	12	2
10	24	(United States) Kevin Gleason	Honda Civic TCR	(Sweden) WestCoast Racing	9	+3.924	11	1
11	33	(Spain) Jordi Oriola	Opel Astra TCR	(Germany) Kissling Motorsport	9	+4.581	13	
12	99	(China) Martin Cao	Ford Focus TCR	(Hong Kong) FRD Motorsports	9	+5.160	17	
13	68	(Macau) Filipe de Souza	Volkswagen Golf GTI TCR	(Germany) Liqui Moly Team Engstler	9	+6.046	16	
14	74	(Spain) Pepe Oriola	SEAT León TCR	(United Kingdom) Team Craft-Bamboo Lukoil	9	+6.114^{5}	6	
15	65	(Malaysia) Douglas Khoo	SEAT León TCR	(Malaysia) Viper Niza Racing	9	+17.146	19	
16	35	(France) Rafaël Galiana	Honda Civic TCR	(Italy) Target Competition	6	Collision	15	
17	9	(Hungary) Attila Tassi	SEAT León TCR	B3 Racing Team Hungary	6	Collision	4	
Ret	77	(Russia) Sergey Afanasyev	SEAT León TCR	(United Kingdom) Team Craft-Bamboo Lukoil	2	Collision	3	
Ret	50	(Netherlands) Loris Hezemans	SEAT León TCR	(Italy) Target Competition	1	Technical	20	
DSQ	64	(China) Neric Wei	Volkswagen Golf GTI TCR	(Macau) Son Veng Racing Team	6	Collision	14	

- ^5 — Pepe Oriola was given a drive through penalty for causing an avoidable collision with Gianni Morbidelli.

== Standings after the event ==
Drivers' Championship standings

	Pos	Driver	Points
	1	(United Kingdom) James Nash	229
1	2	(Switzerland) Stefano Comini	227
1	3	(Spain) Pepe Oriola	213
	4	(France) Jean-Karl Vernay	201
1	5	(Slovakia) Maťo Homola	173

Model of the Year standings

	Pos	Car	Points
	1	SEAT León	657
	2	Volkswagen Golf GTI TCR	546
	3	Honda Civic TCR	477
	4	Alfa Romeo Giulietta TCR	77
1	5	Opel Astra TCR	30

Teams' Championship standings

Pos	Driver	Points
1	(United Kingdom) Team Craft-Bamboo Lukoil	525
2	(Luxembourg) Leopard Racing	436
3	(Sweden) WestCoast Racing	392
4	B3 Racing Team Hungary	375
5	(Germany) Liqui Moly Team Engstler	124

- Note: Only the top five positions are included for both sets of drivers' standings.
