= Maťo Homola =

Slovak racing driver

Mato Homola
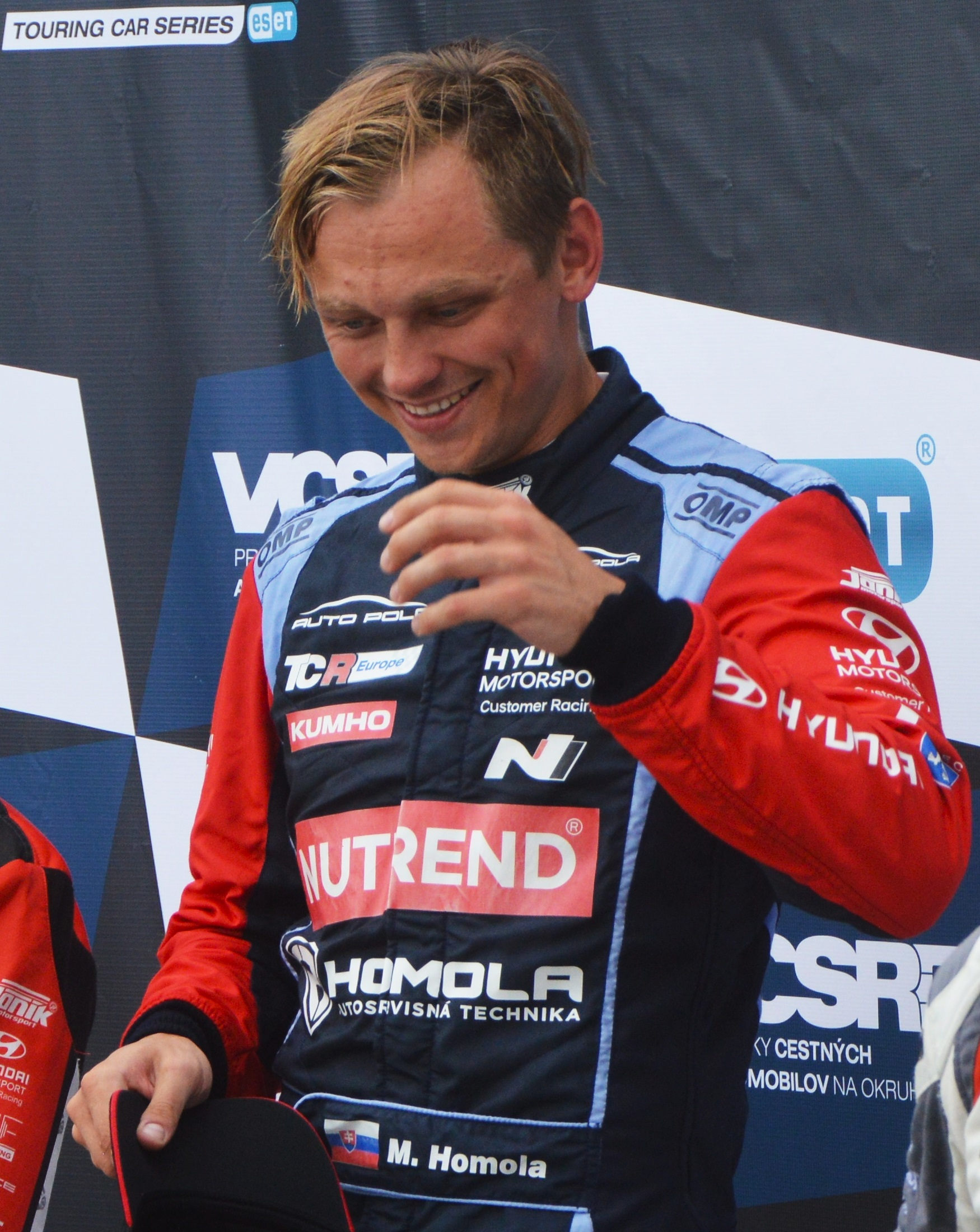
- Homola at the 2022 Grand Prix of Slovakia
- Nationality: Slovak
- Born: 19 July 1994 (age 32) Bratislava, Slovakia

GT2 European Series career
- Debut season: 2024
- Current team: RTR Projects
- Car number: 89
- Former teams: Target Competition, BRC Racing Team, Janik Motorsport
- Starts: 18
- Wins: 2
- Podiums: 10
- Poles: 1
- Fastest laps: 2
- Best finish: 1st in 2025
Medal record
Touring Car Racing
Representing Slovakia
FIA Motorsport Games
Bronze medal – third place	2019 Rome	Touring Car Cup

Maťo Homola (born 19 July 1994) is a Slovak professional racing driver and coach. He is a two-time TCR Eastern Europe Champion (2023, 2024), FIA WTCR race winner (Vila Real, 2018), GT2 European Series race winner with KTM, and 2025 Slovak Hillclimb Champion. Homola is recognized as one of the most successful Slovak circuit racers, with international success across touring car and GT categories. Mato became also a Hyundai N ambassador for Slovakia in 2019 and Orlen Slovakia ambassador in 2025.

== Early career ==
Homola was born on 19 July 1994 in Bratislava. HE began his motorsport career in karting before progressing to car racing in national and regional touring car competitions. His early performances quickly drew attention, leading to opportunities in European touring car series.

== GT and prototype racing ==
Parallel to his touring car success, Homola expanded into GT and endurance racing. He competed in the GT2 European Series with KTM X-Bow GT2, taking multiple podium finishes and race victories in 2024 and 2025 with team RTR Projects.

Earlier, with Slovak team ARC Bratislava he earned a class win at the 12 Hours of Monza (2020) in a Lamborghini Huracán Super Trofeo, competing in the 24H Series.

Homola has also tested and raced a wide range of high-performance machinery, including GT3, GT4, and prototype (LMP3 and LMP2) cars, such as the BMW M4 GT3, Porsche 911 GT3 Cup (992), Ligier JS P217 (LMP2), and Ginetta LMP3.

== Touring car racing ==
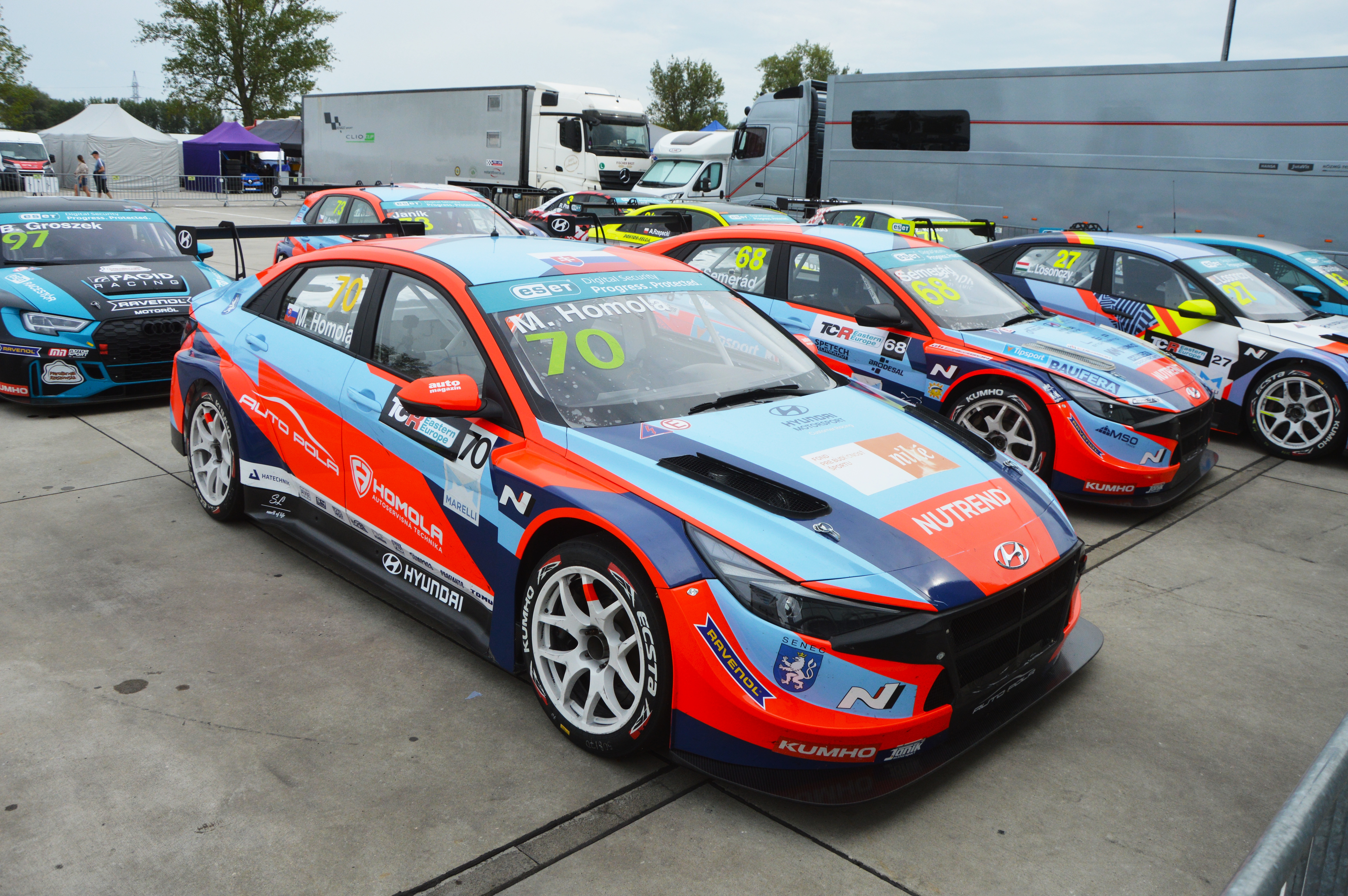
Homola's Hyundai Elantra N TCR, which he uses in TCR Europe and TCR Eastern Europe Trophy as of 2022

=== FIA ETCC - European Touring Car Cup (2012–2015) ===
Homola had raced successive seasons in the European Touring Car Cup for Homola Motorsport. He was the runner-up in the championship in both 2013 and 2014 in the S2000 class. In 2015, he made the switch to the Single-makes Trophy where every driver competes with a SEAT León Cup Racer. That same year, he also made a one-off appearance at the Slovak round in the WTCC with Campos Racing.

=== TCR International Series (2016–2017) ===
After having successfully finished on fifth position in 2016 in TCR International Series with B3 Racing Team Hungary, Homola has switched to DG Sport Competition and Opel Astra OPC TCR.

=== FIA WTCR (2018) ===
Before the end of 2017 season, TCR International Series and FIA WTCC agreed on a mutual collaboration that led to a brand new world championship - FIA WTCR.

Homola, as the only Slovak driver, got into the FIA WTCR starting grid, mainly thanks to the positive relationship with DG Sport Competition. Homola competed in FIA WTCR with brand new Peugeot 308 TCR in Belgian team DG Sport Competition.

Homola placed first on the Vila Real race track in Portugal. During the whole race, he was fighting with 3-time BTCC Champion, Gordon Shedden, and four-time World Champion, Yvan Muller on Hyundai i30 N TCR. Both of them couldn't pass Homola and he finished in first place.

Homola finished the FIA WTCR season in 18th place.

=== FIA Motorsport Games (2019) ===
In November 2019 at the inaugural FIA Motorsport Games held at the Autodromo di Vallelunga near Rome, Homola represented Slovakia in the Touring Car Cup class, driving a Hyundai i30 N TCR for the BRC Racing Team.

Homola began the weekend strongly by finishing second in the first race, putting him in contention for a medal. In Race 2, he adopted a conservative strategy, finishing fifth and securing the third position for Slovakia.

The result marked a significant international achievement in Homola's career and contributed to the profile of Slovak motorsport on the global stage.

=== TCR Europe (2019–2022) ===
From 2019 to 2022, Homola competed in the TCR Europe Touring Car Series. He joined the series in 2019 with the Italian outfit Target Competition driving a Hyundai i30 N TCR, took pole position at the season-opening Hungaroring and converted it into a win. He recorded additional podium finishes that year and ended the season 8th in the drivers’ standings.

In 2020, Homola moved to BRC Racing Team still competing in TCR Europe, finishing the championship in 7th place.

Work through the 2021 and 2022 seasons saw Homola continue with Hyundai machinery under the banner of Janík Motorsport, but results proved more challenging: he finished 13th in 2021 and 14th in 2022 in the overall standings.

=== TCR Eastern Europe (2023–2024) ===
In 2023, Homola joined the TCR Eastern Europe championship with the Janík Motorsport team and the Hyundai Elantra N TCR. He collected nine podium finishes including three victories (two of them at his home event at the Slovakia Ring) and clinched the drivers’ title ahead of the final round.

In 2024, Homola continued in TCR Eastern Europe, defending his title in a tightly contested season. Despite facing strong competition from his teammate Adam Kout, he secured five wins and numerous podiums to retain the championship by just five points.

Throughout both seasons, Homola's results contributed not only to driver honours but also helped Janík Motorsport and Hyundai-customer efforts secure team standings, reflecting a consistent high-level performance in the regional TCR category.

== Racing record ==
=== Career summary ===
Season	Series	Team	Races	Wins	Poles	FLaps	Podiums	Points	Position
2012	European Touring Car Cup - S2000	Homola Motorsport	4	0	0	0	2	12	9th
2013	European Touring Car Cup - S2000	Homola Motorsport	10	3	0	0	8	74	**2nd**
2014	European Touring Car Cup - S2000 TC2T	Homola Motorsport	10	1	1	4	8	93	**2nd**
2015	European Touring Car Cup - Single-Make Trophy	Homola Motorsport	12	2	1	2	7	77	4th
2015	World Touring Car Championship	Campos Racing	2	0	0	0	0	0	NC
2016	TCR International Series	B3 Racing Team Hungary	21	1	1	2	3	175	5th
2017	TCR International Series	DG Sport Compétition	20	0	3	1	2	80	11th
2017	TCR BeNeLux Touring Car Championship	DG Sport Compétition	3	1	0	0	1	49	24th
2017	TCR Middle East Series	Liqui Moly Team Engstler	2	0	0	2	1	30	7th
2018	World Touring Car Cup	DG Sport Compétition	30	1	0	0	1	48	18th
2018	TCR Middle East Series	Pit Lane Competizioni 2	4	0	0	1	2	64	4th
2019	TCR Europe Touring Car Series	Autodis Racing by Target Competition	14	1	1	0	2	194	8th
2019	TCR BeNeLux Touring Car Championship	Autodis Racing by Target Competition	10	1	1	0	2	212	6th
2019	FIA Motorsport Games Touring Car Cup	Team Slovakia	2	0	0	0	1	29	**3rd**
2020	TCR Europe Touring Car Series	BRC Racing Team	12	0	1	0	3	204	7th
2020	24H GT Series - GTX	ARC Bratislava							
2021	TCR Europe Touring Car Series	Janík Motorsport	13	1	0	0	2	186	13th
2022	TCR Europe Touring Car Series	Janík Motorsport	9	0	0	0	1	79	14th
2022	TCR Eastern Europe Trophy	Janík Motorsport	4	2	1	3	3	83	6th
2023	TCR Eastern Europe Trophy	Janík Motorsport	12	3	1	2	9	212	**1st**
2024	TCR Eastern Europe Trophy	Janík Motorsport	12	4	2	2	8	236	**1st**
2024	TCR Europe Touring Car Series	Janík Motorsport	2	0	0	0	1	0	NC†
2025	GT2 European Series - Pro-Am	RTR Projects							
2026	GT2 European Series - Pro-Am	RTR Projects							

^{†} As Homola was a guest driver, he was ineligible for points. ^{*} Season still in progress.

=== Complete World Touring Car Championship results ===
(key) (Races in bold indicate pole position) (Races in italics indicate fastest lap)

Year	Team	Car	1	2	3	4	5	6	7	8	9	10	11	12	13	14	15	16	17	18	19	20	21	22	23	24	DC	Points
2015	Campos Racing	Chevrolet RML Cruze TC1	ARG; 1	ARG; 2	MAR; 1	MAR; 2	HUN; 1	HUN; 2	GER; 1	GER; 2	RUS; 1	RUS; 2	SVK; 1; 13	SVK; 2; 15	FRA; 1	FRA; 2	POR; 1	POR; 2	JPN; 1	JPN; 2	CHN; 1	CHN; 2	THA; 1	THA; 2	QAT; 1	QAT; 2	NC	0

=== Complete TCR International Series results ===
(key) (Races in bold indicate pole position) (Races in italics indicate fastest lap)

Year	Team	Car	1	2	3	4	5	6	7	8	9	10	11	12	13	14	15	16	17	18	19	20	21	22	DC	Points
2016	B3 Racing Team Hungary	SEAT León TCR	BHR; 1; 8	BHR; 2; 11	**EST**; **1**; 4	EST; 2; 8	SPA; 1; 4	SPA; 2; 4	IMO; 1; 5	IMO; 2; 2	SAL; 1; 3	SAL; 2; 5	OSC; 1; 1	OSC; 2; 5	SOC; 1; 9	SOC; 2; 9	CHA; 1 Ret	CHA; 2; 10	MRN; 1; 4	MRN; 2; 5	SEP; 1; 10	SEP; 2; 16	MAC; 1 Ret	MAC; 2 DNS	5th	175
2017	DG Sport Compétition	Opel Astra TCR	RIM; 1; 11	RIM; 2 Ret	**BHR**; **1**; 13	BHR; 2; 13	SPA; 1; 24	SPA; 2 Ret	MNZ; 1; 7	MNZ; 2; 6	**SAL**; **1**; 2	SAL; 2; 10	HUN; 1; 10	HUN; 2; 12	OSC; 1; 7	OSC; 2; 2	**CHA**; **1**; 22†	CHA; 2; 9	ZHE; 1 Ret	ZHE; 2 Ret	DUB; 1; 8	DUB; 2 Ret			11th	80

^{†} Driver did not finish the race, but was classified as he completed over 75% of the race distance.

=== Complete World Touring Car Cup results ===
(key) (Races in bold indicate pole position) (Races in italics indicate fastest lap)

Year	Team	Car	1	2	3	4	5	6	7	8	9	10	11	12	13	14	15	16	17	18	19	20	21	22	23	24	25	26	27	28	29	30	DC	Points
2018	DG Sport Compétition	Peugeot 308 TCR	MAR; 1 Ret	MAR; 2; 12	MAR; 3; 13	HUN; 1; 20	HUN; 2 NC	HUN; 3; 20	GER; 1; 14	GER; 2; 14	GER; 3; 16	NED; 1; 18	NED; 2; 18	NED; 3; 16	POR; 1; 12	POR; 2; 1	POR; 3; 5	SVK; 1; 14	SVK; 2; 16	SVK; 3; 11	CHN; 1; 17	CHN; 2; 16	CHN; 3; 18	WUH; 1 Ret	WUH; 2 Ret	WUH; 3 Ret	JPN; 1; 7	JPN; 2; 20	JPN; 3; 15	MAC; 1; 10	MAC; 2; 17	MAC; 3; 12	18th	48

=== Complete TCR Europe Touring Car Series results ===
(key) (Races in bold indicate pole position) (Races in italics indicate fastest lap)

Year	Team	Car	1	2	3	4	5	6	7	8	9	10	11	12	13	14	DC	Points
2019	Autodis Racing by Target Competition	Hyundai i30 N TCR	**HUN**; **1**; 1	HUN; 2; 11	HOC; 1 Ret	HOC; 2 Ret	SPA; 1; 7	SPA; 2; 2	RBR; 1; 9	RBR; 2; 6	OSC; 1; 6	OSC; 2 Ret	CAT; 1; 13	CAT; 2; 16	MNZ; 1; 5	MNZ; 2; 14	8th	194
2020	BRC Racing Team	Hyundai i30 N TCR	LEC; 1; 8	LEC; 2; 12	ZOL; 1; 3^{2}	ZOL; 2; 8	MNZ; 1; 17†	MNZ; 2; 3	**CAT**; **1**; 4^{1}	CAT; 2; 20	SPA; 1; 15^{10}	SPA; 2; 12	JAR; 1; 3^{3}	JAR; 2; 11			7th	204
2021	Janík Motorsport	Hyundai i30 N TCR	SVK; 1 DNS	SVK; 2; 12	LEC; 1; 11	LEC; 2; 9	ZAN; 1; 13	ZAN; 2; 11	SPA; 1; 14	SPA; 2; 2	NÜR; 1; 10	NÜR; 2 Ret	MNZ; 1; 6	MNZ; 2; 1	CAT; 1; 13	CAT; 2; 7	13th	186
2022	Janík Motorsport	Hyundai Elantra N TCR	ALG; 1; 12	ALG; 2; 18	LEC; 1; 18	LEC; 2; 18	SPA; 1 Ret	SPA; 2; 2	NOR; 1; 6	NOR; 2; 9	NÜR; 1 Ret	NÜR; 2 C	MNZ; 1	MNZ; 2	CAT; 1	CAT; 2	14th	79
2024	Janík Motorsport	Hyundai Elantra N TCR	VAL; 1	VAL; 2	ZOL; 1	ZOL; 2	SAL; 1	SAL; 2	SPA; 1	SPA; 2	BRN; 1; 3	BRN; 2; 11	CRT; 1	CRT; 2			NC‡	0‡

^{†} Driver did not finish the race, but was classified as he completed over 75% of the race distance. ^{‡} As Homola was a guest driver, he was ineligible for points.
