= 2022 TCR Eastern Europe Trophy =

2022 European motorsport event

The 2022 TCR Eastern Europe Trophy (also called 2022 TCR Eastern Europe Trophy powered by ESET for sponsorship reasons) is the fourth season of the TCR Eastern Europe Trophy.

== Calendar ==
The TCR Eastern Europe calendar was launched on November 26, 2021 and includes six events in six countries.

Rnd.		Circuit/Location	Date
1	1	Hungaroring, Budapest, Hungary	8–10 April
1	2	Hungaroring, Budapest, Hungary	8–10 April
2	3	Red Bull Ring, Spielberg, Austria	4–5 June
2	4	Red Bull Ring, Spielberg, Austria	4–5 June
3	5	Tor Poznań, Poznań, Poland	24–26 June
3	6	Tor Poznań, Poznań, Poland	24–26 June
4	7	Automotodrom Grobnik, Rijeka, Croatia	23–24 July
4	8	Automotodrom Grobnik, Rijeka, Croatia	23–24 July
5	9	Automotodróm Slovakia Ring, Orechová Potôň, Slovakia	20–21 August
5	10	Automotodróm Slovakia Ring, Orechová Potôň, Slovakia	20–21 August
6	11	Autodrom Most, Most, Czech Republic	2–4 September
6	12	Autodrom Most, Most, Czech Republic	2–4 September

== Teams and drivers ==
Kumho Tires is the single tire supplier for the TCR Eastern Europe 2022 season.

Team	Car	No.	Drivers	Class	Rounds	Ref.
(Poland) Basenhurt A&T Racing	Volkswagen Golf GTI TCR	2	(Poland) Tomasz Rzepecki	J T	All	
(Poland) Basenhurt A&T Racing	Audi RS3 LMS TCR (2017)	34	(Poland) Adam Rzepecki	T	5–6	
(Slovenia) AK Olimpija	Audi RS3 LMS TCR (2017)	3	(Slovenia) Robert Pravdič	T	4–5	
(Czech Republic) Fullín Race Academy	Cupra León Competición TCR	14	(Czech Republic) Petr Čížek		All	
(Czech Republic) Fullín Race Academy	Cupra León Competición TCR	22	(Germany) Carol Wittke		1–2	
(Czech Republic) Fullín Race Academy	Cupra León Competición TCR	22	(Czech Republic) Petr Fulín		6	
(Slovenia) Lema Racing	Cupra León TCR	17	(Croatia) Grega Šimunović	T	4	
(Germany) Steibel Motorsport	Cupra León TCR	23	(Germany) Sebastian Steibel	T	All	
(Czech Republic) Janik Motorsport	Hyundai Elantra N TCR	24	(Czech Republic) Jáchym Galáš	J	1	
(Czech Republic) Janik Motorsport	Hyundai Elantra N TCR	70	(Slovakia) Maťo Homola		1, 5	
(Czech Republic) Janik Motorsport	Hyundai Elantra N TCR	68	(Czech Republic) Petr Semerád	J T	5	
(Czech Republic) Janik Motorsport	Hyundai i30 N TCR	68	(Czech Republic) Petr Semerád	J T	1–4, 6	
(Czech Republic) Janik Motorsport	Hyundai i30 N TCR	73	(Czech Republic) Václav Janík	T	All	
(Hungary) Zsille Motorsport	Alfa Romeo Giulietta TCR	27	(Hungary) Levente Losonczy	J T	1–2	
(Italy) Hyundai N Team Aggressive Italia	Hyundai Elantra N TCR	27	(Hungary) Levente Losonczy	J	5	
(Serbia) ASK Vesnic	Audi RS3 LMS TCR (2017)	31	(Serbia) Milovan Vesnić	T	1–2, 4	
(Germany) CS-Motorsport	Audi RS3 LMS TCR (2017)	33	(Bosnia and Herzegovina) Sanel Cehic	T	1–3	
(Germany) RaceSing	Hyundai i30 N TCR	34	(Germany) Patrick Sing	J T	2	
(Slovakia) Aditis Racing	Audi RS 3 LMS TCR (2021)	38	(Czech Republic) Radim Adámek	T	4–6	
(Slovakia) Aditis Racing	Audi RS3 LMS TCR (2017)	38	(Czech Republic) Radim Adámek	T	1–3	
(Slovakia) Aditis Racing	Audi RS3 LMS TCR (2017)	97	(Poland) Bartosz Groszek	T	All	
(Slovakia) Aditis Racing	Cupra León TCR	82	(Czech Republic) Vít Smejkal	T	2, 5–6	
(Croatia) Auto Klub Dubrovnik Racing	Cupra León Competición TCR	74	(Croatia) Žarko Knego		All	
(Switzerland) Besagroup Vukovic Motorsport	Renault Mégane R.S TCR	75	(Switzerland) Milenko Vukovic		1–3	
(Switzerland) Besagroup Vukovic Motorsport	Renault Mégane R.S TCR	76	(Germany) Franjo Kovac	T	1–2	
(Switzerland) Besagroup Vukovic Motorsport	Renault Mégane R.S TCR	76	(Switzerland) Milan Vukovic	T	3	

== Results ==
Rnd.		Circuit	Pole position	Fastest lap	Winning driver	Winning team	Winning Junior driver
1	1	Hungaroring, Budapest, Hungary	(Poland) Bartosz Groszek	(Slovakia) Maťo Homola	(Poland) Bartosz Groszek	(Slovakia) Aditis Racing	(Czech Republic) Petr Semerád
1	2	Hungaroring, Budapest, Hungary		(Czech Republic) Jáchym Galáš	(Czech Republic) Jáchym Galáš	(Czech Republic) Janik Motorsport	(Czech Republic) Jáchym Galáš
2	3	Red Bull Ring, Spielberg, Austria	(Switzerland) Milenko Vukovic	(Czech Republic) Petr Semerád	(Germany) Patrick Sing	(Germany) RaceSing	(Germany) Patrick Sing
2	4	Red Bull Ring, Spielberg, Austria		(Czech Republic) Petr Semerád	(Switzerland) Milenko Vukovic	(Switzerland) Besagroup Vukovic Motorsport	(Czech Republic) Petr Semerád
3	5	Tor Poznań, Poznań, Poland	(Czech Republic) Petr Semerád	(Czech Republic) Petr Semerád	(Czech Republic) Petr Semerád	(Czech Republic) Janik Motorsport	(Czech Republic) Petr Semerád
3	6	Tor Poznań, Poznań, Poland		(Czech Republic) Petr Semerád	(Poland) Bartosz Groszek	(Slovakia) Aditis Racing	(Czech Republic) Petr Semerád
4	7	Automotodrom Grobnik, Rijeka, Croatia	(Poland) Bartosz Groszek	(Poland) Bartosz Groszek	(Serbia) Milovan Vesnić	(Serbia) ASK Vesnic	(Czech Republic) Petr Semerád
4	8	Automotodrom Grobnik, Rijeka, Croatia		Race Cancelled			
5	9	Automotodróm Slovakia Ring, Orechová Potôň, Slovakia	(Slovakia) Maťo Homola	(Slovakia) Maťo Homola	(Slovakia) Maťo Homola	(Czech Republic) Janík Motorsport	(Czech Republic) Petr Semerád
5	10	Automotodróm Slovakia Ring, Orechová Potôň, Slovakia		(Slovakia) Maťo Homola	(Slovakia) Maťo Homola	(Czech Republic) Janík Motorsport	(Czech Republic) Petr Semerád
6	11	Autodrom Most, Most, Czech Republic	(Czech Republic) Petr Fulín	(Czech Republic) Petr Fulín	(Czech Republic) Petr Fulín	(Czech Republic) Fullín Race Academy	(Czech Republic) Petr Semerád
6	12	Autodrom Most, Most, Czech Republic		(Czech Republic) Petr Fulín	(Czech Republic) Petr Fulín	(Czech Republic) Fullín Race Academy	(Poland) Tomasz Rzepecki

=== Drivers' standings ===
Scoring system

Position	**1st**	**2nd**	**3rd**	**4th**	**5th**	**6th**	**7th**	**8th**	**9th**	**10th**	Fastest lap
Qualifying	3	2	1	—N/a							
Race	25	18	15	12	10	8	6	4	2	1	1

Pos.	Driver	HUN (Hungary)		RBR (Austria)		POZ (Poland)		GRO (Croatia)		SVK (Slovakia)		MOS (Czech Republic)		Pts.
Pos.	Driver	R1	R2	R1	R2	R1	R2	R1	R2	R1	R2	R1	R2	Pts.
1	(Poland) Bartosz Groszek	**1**^{1}	4	4	4	2	1	**2**^{1}	C	4	3	4	4	180
2	(Czech Republic) Petr Semerád	4	2	Ret^{2}	2	**1**^{1}	2	3^{3}	C	2^{2}	2	3	Ret	169
3	(Czech Republic) Petr Čížek	6	7	2^{3}	8	3^{2}	4	4	C	3	4	2^{3}	5	134
4	(Czech Republic) Václav Janík	Ret	12	3	3	5^{3}	3	6	C	7	5	6	2	106
5	(Germany) Sebastian Steibel	7	9	5	9	6	6	5	C	5	8	5^{2}	3	87
6	(Slovakia) Maťo Homola	2^{3}	6							**1**^{1}	1			83
7	(Switzerland) Milenko Vukovic	3	3	**Ret**^{1}	1	4	9†							72
8	(Czech Republic) Petr Fulín											**1**^{1}	1	55
8	(Poland) Tomasz Rzepecki	8	5	7	6	8	5	10	C	12	7	Ret	10	50
10	(Germany) Patrick Sing			1	5									35
11	(Hungary) Levente Losonczy	5	NC	6	13†	WD	WD			6^{3}	6			35
12	(Serbia) Milovan Vesnić	Ret	10	Ret	7			1^{2}	C					34
13	(Czech Republic) Jáchym Galáš	Ret^{2}	1											28
14	(Croatia) Žarko Knego	11	13	Ret	Ret	10	7	11†	C	9	Ret	8	6	21
15	(Czech Republic) Radim Adámek	10	14	9	Ret	9	8	7	C	13	DNS	10	8	20
16	(Poland) Adam Rzepecki									8	Ret	7	7	10
17	(Czech Republic) Vít Smejkal	WD	WD	8	10					11	10	9	9	10
18	(Slovenia) Robert Pravdič							8	C	10	9			7
19	(Switzerland) Milan Vukovic					7	Ret							6
20	(Germany) Carol Wittke	Ret	8	11	Ret	WD	WD	WD	WD					4
21	(Bosnia and Herzegovina) Sanel Cehic	9	11	10	12	Ret	DNS							3
22	(Slovenia) Grega Šimunović							9	C					2
23	(Germany) Franjo Kovac	12	15	Ret	11									0
Pos.	Driver	HUN (Hungary)		RBR (Austria)		POZ (Poland)		GRO (Croatia)		SVK (Slovakia)		MOS (Czech Republic)		Pts.

Colour	Result
Gold	Winner
Silver	Second place
Bronze	Third place
Green	Points classification
Blue	Non-points classification
Blue	Non-classified finish (NC)
Purple	Retired, not classified (Ret)
Red	Did not qualify (DNQ)
Red	Did not pre-qualify (DNPQ)
Black	Disqualified (DSQ)
White	Did not start (DNS)
White	Withdrew (WD)
White	Race cancelled (C)
Blank	Did not practice (DNP)
Blank	Did not arrive (DNA)
Blank	Excluded (EX)

**Bold** – Pole

Italics – Fastest Lap

† – Drivers did not finish the race, but were classified as they completed over 70% of the race distance.
