= Rafaël Galiana =

French racing driver

- Nationality: French
- Born: 29 May 1960 (age 66) Aubagne, Bouches-du-Rhône

TCR International Series career
- Debut season: 2015
- Current team: WestCoast Racing
- Car number: 99
- Former teams: Target Competition
- Starts: 13
- Wins: 0
- Poles: 0
- Fastest laps: 0

Previous series
- 2001-04 1986-01: Peugeot 206 Cup; Karting

Rafaël Galiana (born 29 May 1960) is a French racing driver currently competing in the TCR International Series. He previously competed in the Peugeot 206 Cup.

== Racing career ==
Galiana began his career in 1986 in karting. In 2001, he switched to the Peugeot 206 Cup, he raced there until 2004. In September 2015, it was announced that Galiana would make his TCR International Series debut with Target Competition driving a SEAT León Cup Racer.

== Racing record ==
=== Complete TCR International Series results ===
(key) (Races in bold indicate pole position) (Races in italics indicate fastest lap)

Year	Team	Car	1	2	3	4	5	6	7	8	9	10	11	12	13	14	15	16	17	18	19	20	21	22	DC	Points
2015	Target Competition	SEAT León Cup Racer	SEP; 1	SEP; 2	SHA; 1	SHA; 2	VAL; 1	VAL; 2	ALG; 1	ALG; 2	MNZ; 1	MNZ; 2	SAL; 1	SAL; 2	SOC; 1	SOC; 2	RBR; 1	RBR; 2	MRN; 1; 13	MRN; 2; 11	CHA; 1; 22†	CHA; 2; 10	MAC; 1 WD	MAC; 2 WD	41st	1
2016	WestCoast Racing	Honda Civic TCR	BHR; 1	BHR; 2	EST; 1	EST; 2	SPA; 1	SPA; 2	IMO; 1	IMO; 2	SAL; 1	SAL; 2	OSC; 1	OSC; 2	SOC; 1	SOC; 2	CHA; 1; 14	CHA; 2 Ret							34th	2
2016	Target Competition	Honda Civic TCR																	MRN; 1; 14	MRN; 2; 16†	SEP; 1 DNS	SEP; 2; 20			34th	2
2016	Target Competition	SEAT León TCR																					MAC; 1; 10	MAC; 2; 14	34th	2
2017	WestCoast Racing	Volkswagen Golf GTI TCR	RIM; 1	RIM; 2	BHR; 1	BHR; 2	SPA; 1	SPA; 2	MNZ; 1	MNZ; 2	SAL; 1	SAL; 2	HUN; 1	HUN; 2	OSC; 1	OSC; 2	CHA; 1	CHA; 2	ZHE; 1; 15	ZHE; 2; 10	DUB; 1	DUB; 2			32nd	4

^{†} Driver did not finish the race, but was classified as he completed over 75% of the race distance.
