= Target Competition =

Auto racing team

- Founded: 2004
- Base: Andrian, South Tyrol
- Team principal(s): Andreas Gummerer; Markus Gummerer
- Current series: TCR Europe Touring Car Series; Italian Touring Car Championship; ADAC TCR Germany Touring Car Championship
- Former series: World Touring Car Cup; TCR International Series; SEAT León Eurocup
- Noted drivers: TCR Europe; 69. (Republic of Ireland) Max Hart
- Website: http://www.targetcompetition.com/

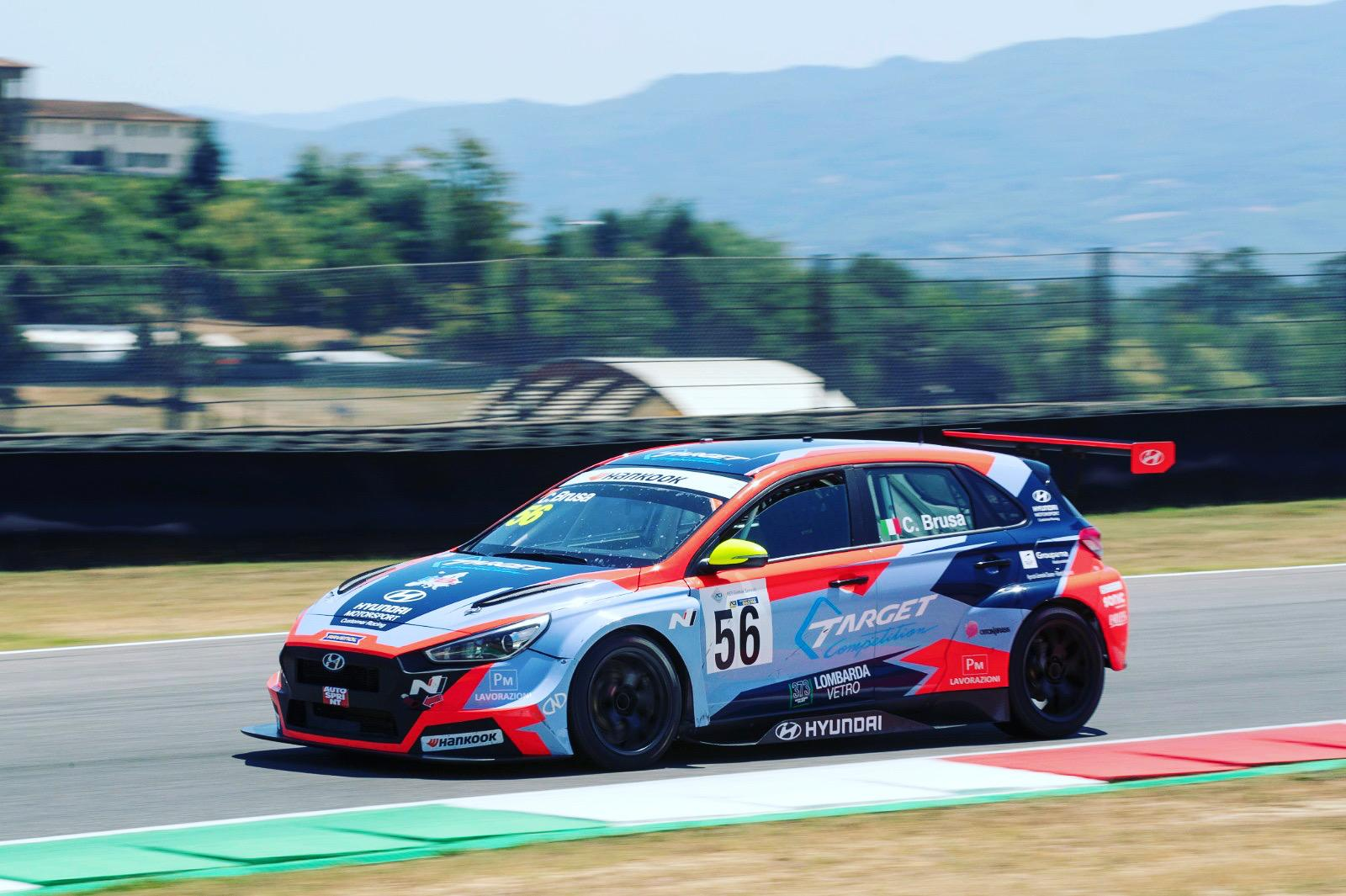
Hyundai i30 N TCR of Target Competition in the 2023 TCR Italy Touring Car Championship

Target Competition is an Italian auto racing team based in Eppan an der Weinstraße, Italy. The team is currently competing in the World Touring Car Cup and TCR Europe Touring Car Series as well in others TCR series. The team has previously raced in the SEAT León Eurocup and TCR International Series.

== TCR International Series ==
=== SEAT León Cup Racer (2015) ===
After having raced in the SEAT León Eurocup in 2014, the team entered the 2015 TCR International Series season with Michel Nykjær, Stefano Comini and Andrea Belicchi driving an SEAT León Cup Racer each. In the Chinese round they entered a fourth SEAT for Alex Yang, however he was about to become a father, so he was replaced by Jiang Tengyi. Nykjær however left the team after the Russian round, due to budget issues. He was replaced by Michela Cerruti. For the second Austrian round at Red Bull Ring they again fielded a fourth SEAT, this time for Gabriele Marotta. Comini won the championship with 30 points clear of his nearest challenger Pepe Oriola while the team won the Teams' championship 19 points clear of Craft-Bamboo Racing.

=== Opel Astra TCR, Honda Civic TCR and SEAT León Cup Racer (2016) ===
Comini left the team to join Leopard Racing for the following season. The team also switched to the new Opel Astra TCR. Initially fielding two Astras for Andrea Belicchi and Jordi Oriola the team would take sabbatical as the car needed more development before returning at Imola with single Honda Civic TCR for Oriola. Oriola raced with the Civic once again at Salzburgring before the team taking another hiatus until the rounds in Asia. in Singapore and Buriram the team fielded one Civic for Rafaël Galiana and one SEAT León TCR for Loris Hezemans. Galiana and Hezemans would swap cars at Macau and fielding additional Civic for TCR Germany champion Josh Files.
