= B3 Racing =

Hungarian auto racing team

(Hungary) B3 Racing
- Founded: 2010
- Team principal(s): Attila Bús
- Current series: TCR International Series
- Former series: European Touring Car Cup; SEAT León Eurocup
- Noted drivers: TCR; 9. (Hungary) Attila Tassi; 62. (Serbia) Dušan Borković; 70. (Slovakia) Maťo Homola
- Drivers' Championships: 2015 ETCC (Borković)
- Website: http://www.b3r.hu/

B3 Racing is a Hungarian auto racing team based in Mogyoród, Hungary. The team has raced in the TCR International Series, since 2016. Having previously raced in the SEAT León Eurocup in 2014 & 2015 and the European Touring Car Cup in 2015.

== European Touring Car Cup ==
After having raced in the SEAT León Eurocup in 2014, the team entered the 2015 European Touring Car Cup with Dušan Borković driving an SEAT León Cup Racer in the Single-makes Trophy. Borković took 5 wins on his way to taking the Single-makes Trophy title.

== TCR International Series ==
=== SEAT León TCR (2016–) ===
Having raced in the European Touring Car Cup in 2015, the team entered the 2016 TCR International Series season with Attila Tassi, Dušan Borković and Maťo Homola driving an SEAT León TCR each. Homola took pole position in the Portuguese round, while Borković took pole position in Belgian round.
