= Marina Bay Street Circuit =

Motorsport race track in Marina Bay, Singapore

- Marina Bay Street Circuit (2025–present)
- Location: Downtown Core and Kallang, Marina Bay, Singapore
- Coordinates: 1°17′29.51″N 103°51′49.86″E
- Capacity: >90,000
- FIA Grade: 1
- Broke ground: 31 August 2007; 19 years ago
- Opened: 31 August 2008; 18 years ago
- Construction cost: ~ SGD $33 million
- Architect: KBR
- Former names: Singapore Street Circuit
- Major events: Current: Formula One; Singapore Grand Prix (2008–2019, 2022–present)

Grand Prix Circuit (2025–present)
- Surface: Asphalt
- Length: 4.927 km (3.061 mi)
- Turns: 19
- Race lap record: 1:33.808 ( (United Kingdom) Lewis Hamilton, Ferrari SF-25, 2025, F1)

Revised Circuit with New Straight between Turns 15–16 (2023–2024)
- Surface: Asphalt
- Length: 4.940 km (3.070 mi)
- Turns: 19
- Race lap record: 1:34.486 ( (Australia) Daniel Ricciardo, RB VCARB 01, 2024, F1)

Revised Circuit with Re-profiled Turns 16–17 (2018–2022)
- Surface: Asphalt
- Length: 5.063 km (3.146 mi)
- Turns: 23
- Race lap record: 1:41.905 ( (Denmark) Kevin Magnussen, Haas VF-18, 2018, F1)

Revised Circuit with Re-profiled Turns 11–13 (2015–2017)
- Surface: Asphalt
- Length: 5.065 km (3.147 mi)
- Turns: 23
- Race lap record: 1:45.008 ( (United Kingdom) Lewis Hamilton, Mercedes W08, 2017, F1)

Revised Circuit with the Singapore Sling Chicane at Turn 10 Removed (2013–2014)
- Surface: Asphalt
- Length: 5.061 km (3.145 mi)
- Turns: 23
- Race lap record: 1:48.574 ( (Germany) Sebastian Vettel, Red Bull RB9, 2013, F1)

Original Circuit (2008–2012)
- Surface: Asphalt
- Length: 5.073 km (3.152 mi)
- Turns: 23
- Race lap record: 1:45.599 ( (Finland) Kimi Räikkönen, Ferrari F2008, 2008, F1)

The Marina Bay Street Circuit (otherwise known as the Singapore Street Circuit) is a street circuit around Marina Bay, Singapore, encompassing the planning areas of Downtown Core (Turns 4 to 19) and Kallang (Turns 1 to 3).

It is the venue for the Singapore Grand Prix. The track is 4.927 km (3.061 mi) long in a harbourside location similar in style to the Circuit de Monaco and the Valencia Street Circuit.

The circuit was designed by KBR, and is a modification of the original one first proposed by Hermann Tilke. The circuit has a FIA Grade 1 license. The circuit held a unique record of having at least one safety car appearance in every Grand Prix until the 2024 race. There has been a total of 24 safety car deployments in 17 races.

== Characteristics ==
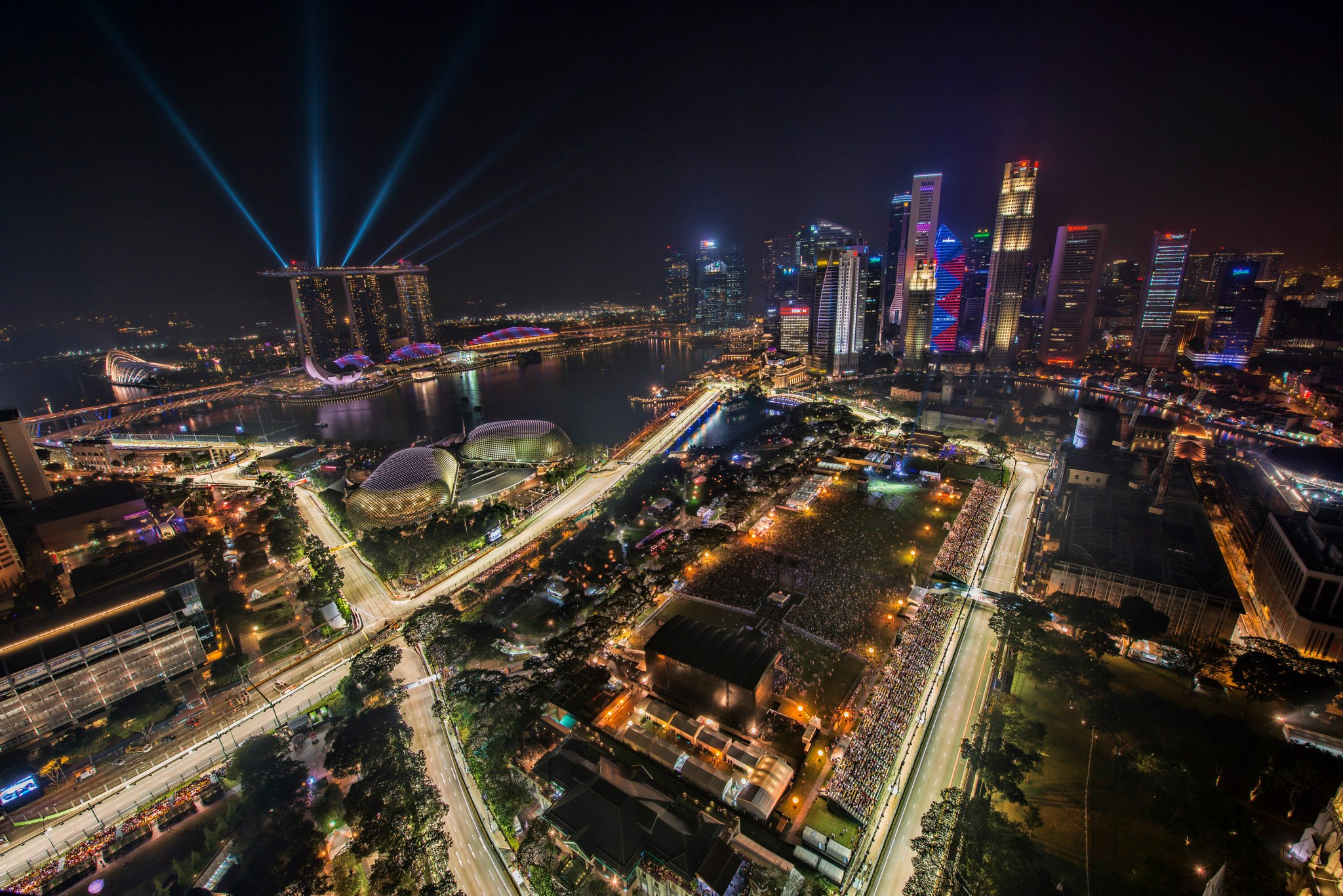
Singapore Marina Bay Street Circuit in 2012.

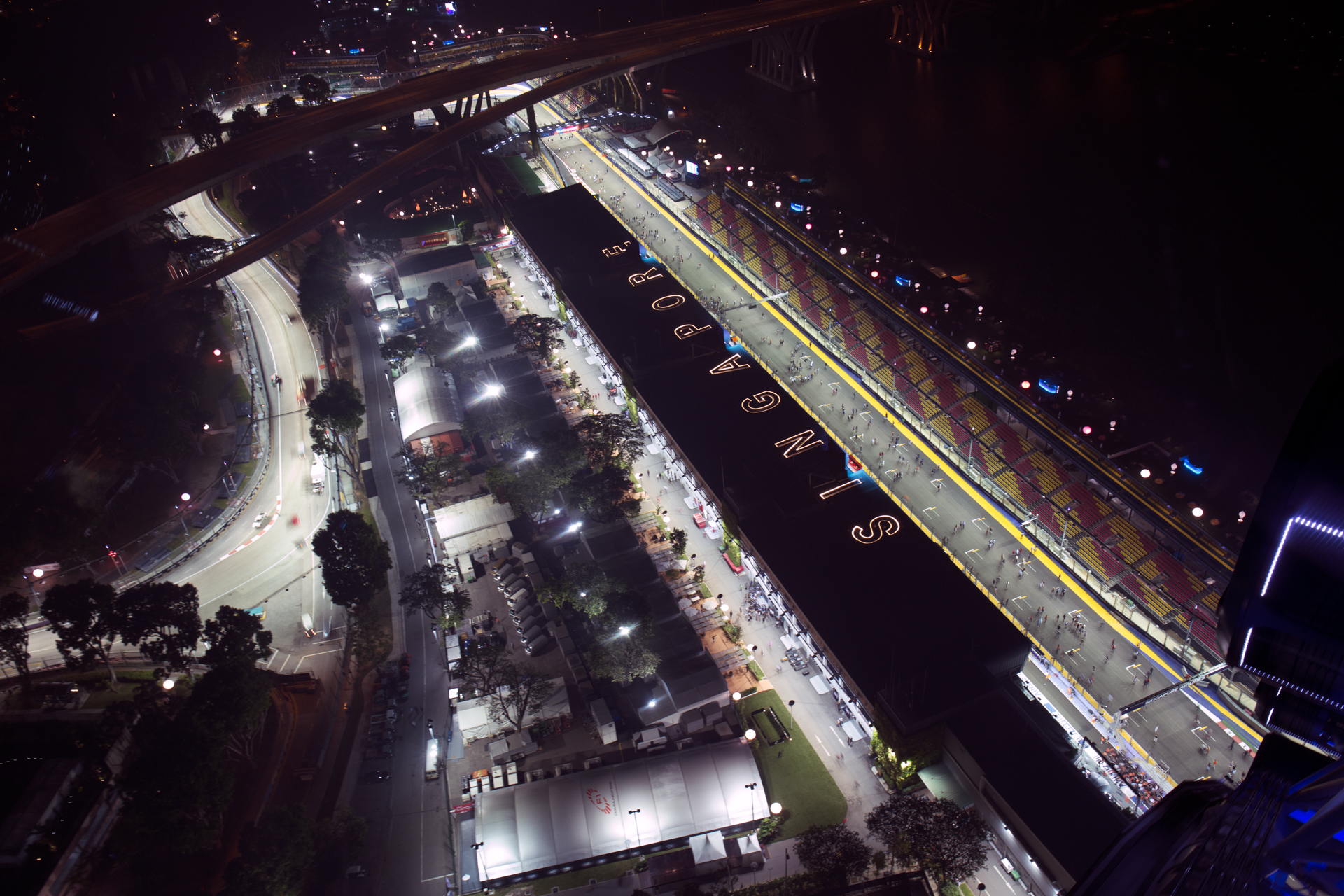
The Singapore Formula One Pit Building before the 2014 Singapore Grand Prix.

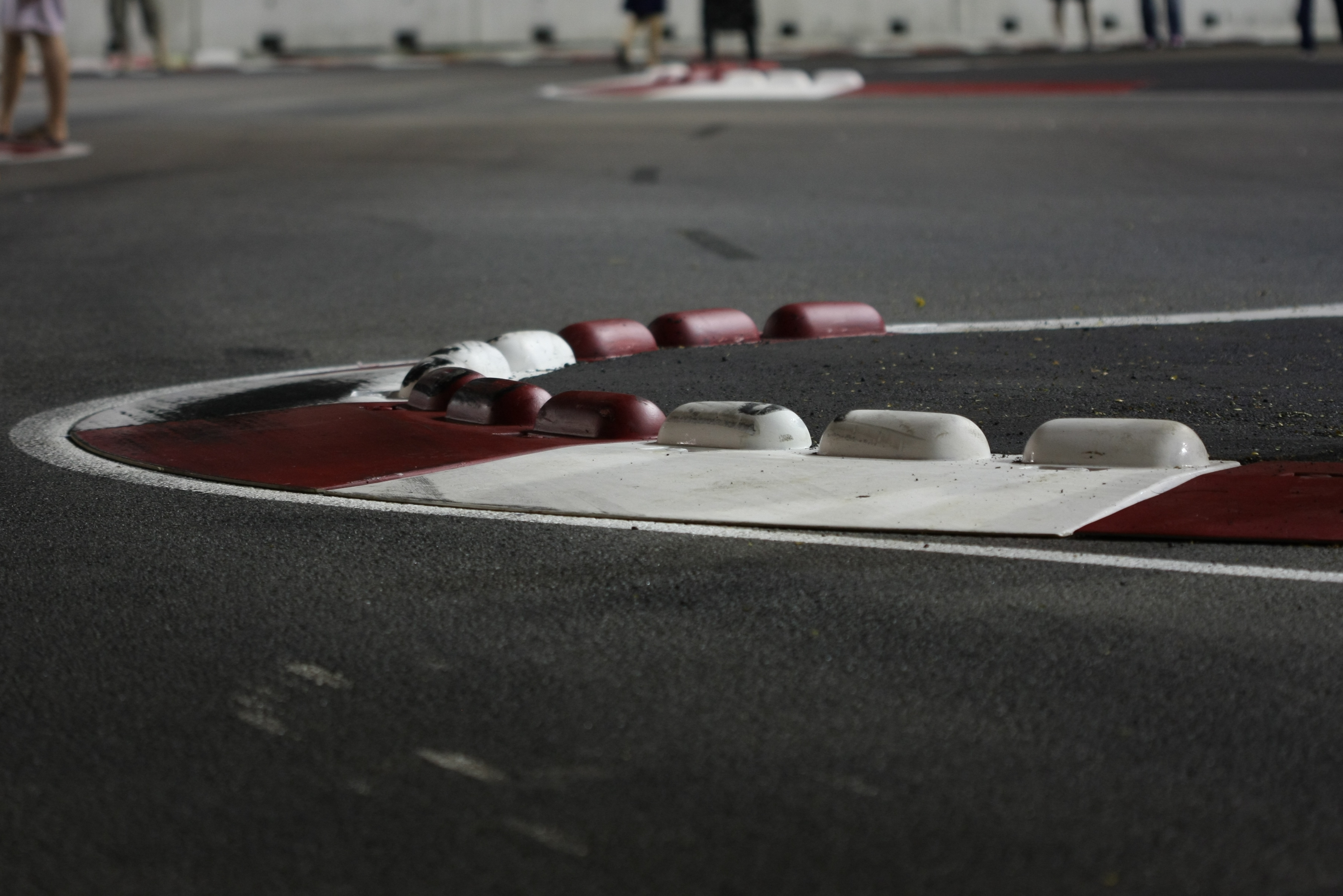
The 'Singapore Sling' chicane (pictured in 2008) was removed before the 2013 Singapore Grand Prix.

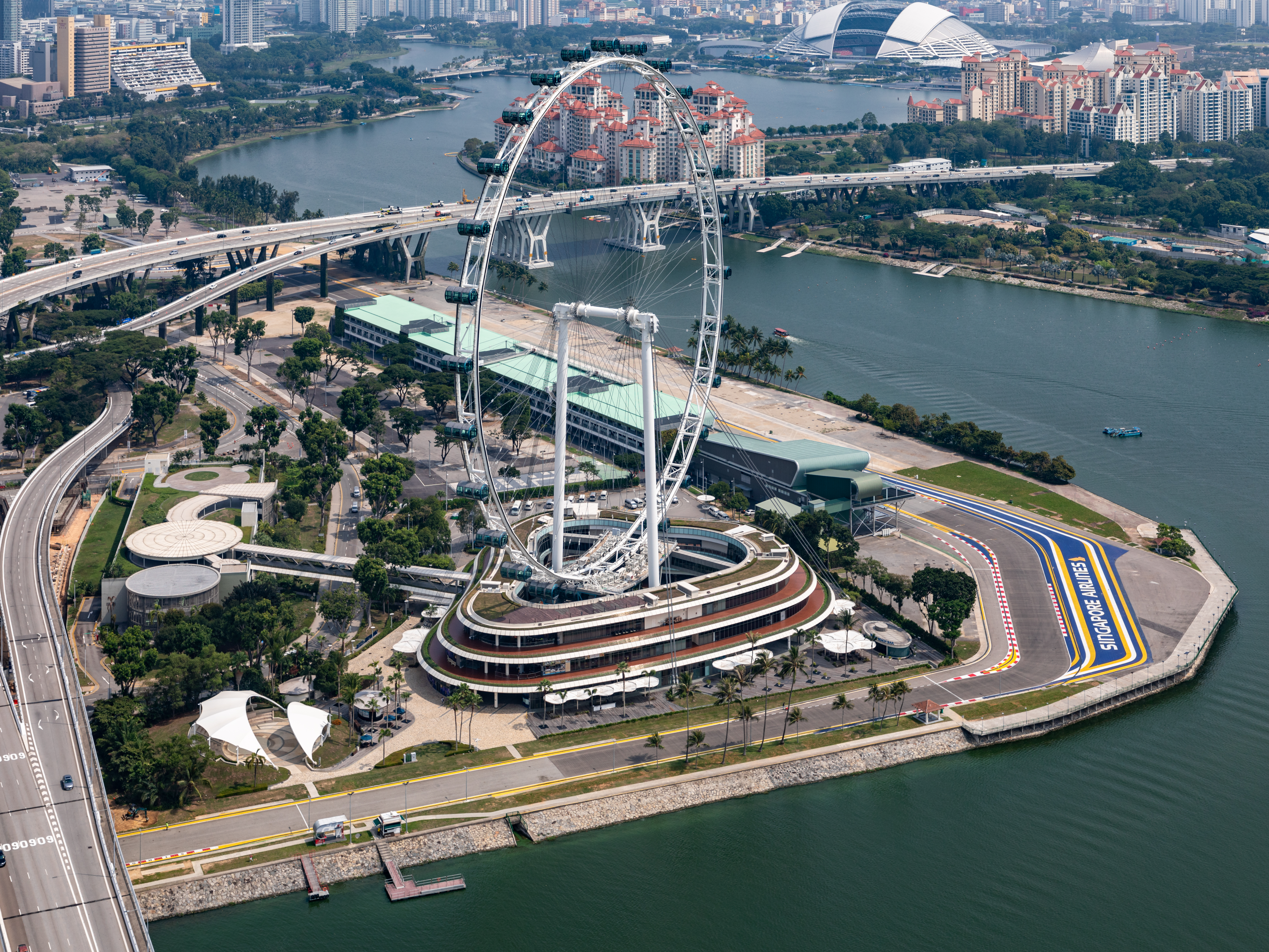
The track in 2019 as it approaches the Pit Building.

On the day of confirmation of the Singapore Grand Prix in the 2008 Formula One season, a routemap was published. The pit area of the circuit is located in an empty plot of land off Republic Boulevard and beside the Singapore Flyer. A temporary road leads from the pit area and under the Benjamin Sheares Bridge to Republic Boulevard and turns onto Raffles Boulevard. It then proceeds along Nicoll Highway, Stamford Road and Saint Andrew's Road around the Padang, past the City Hall.

The track then goes onto the Anderson Bridge, past the Fullerton Hotel and make a tight left turn to Esplanade Drive beside the Merlion Park. It joins Raffles Avenue, then returning to the pit area via a second temporary road around the Singapore Flyer.

The track was widely criticised by F1 drivers for being excessively bumpy, particularly on Raffles Boulevard between turns 5 and 7, resulting in a very unforgiving circuit, especially given the hot and humid conditions of the Singapore climate. 2008 World Champion Lewis Hamilton commented that it was twice as hard to negotiate as the more famous Circuit de Monaco and unexpectedly physical – requiring double the amount of energy over a single lap as compared to the Monaco circuit.

Several drivers, including Sébastien Bourdais and Fernando Alonso, expressed their concern about the high and harsh kerbs at the chicane at turn 10 of the street circuit. Ferrari's Felipe Massa compared the kerbs akin to "little tortoises that would wreck the car if you get something wrong". The drivers were worried that hitting the bumps could cause suspension damage or even damage a tub. They also raised concerns that the bumps would pitch them into the wall on the outside of the corner. Whilst the FIA had been involved in the development of these kerbs, in response to the drivers' concerns FIA race director and safety delegate Charlie Whiting agreed to lower the kerbs at the turn 10 chicane ahead of Friday's free practice. The kerbs were further reduced in height for Saturday's qualifying round and Sunday's race. The chicane at Turn 10 was reprofiled for the 2010 race in an attempt to make it safer and the turns more gradual by moving the kerbs, however Lewis Hamilton said in an interview this modification made the chicane more dangerous by making the entry to the corner smaller, calling the complex "the worst corner in F1". In 2013, ahead of the race, the chicane was removed and replaced with a left turn, resulting in faster lap times.

The entry of the pit lane, which begins at the penultimate corner of the 23-turn layout, was deemed to be "difficult and incredibly dangerous" by several drivers due to the fast nature of the corners where they were situated. The problem was deemed to be primarily due to the speed differential of those entering the pits and those continuing on another lap and their sharing of the same race line. The controversial pit entry at Singapore was then modified ahead of Saturday's qualifying round by extending the pit entry line away from the pits. This change compelled drivers to commit to the pit entry earlier, providing additional warning to those following behind. In March 2009, three of the circuit's corners were given names after a competition amongst local F1 fans to submit ideas. Turn 1 was named Sheares after Benjamin Henry Sheares, the second president of Singapore; Turn 7 was named Memorial due to its proximity to a Second World War civilian memorial; and Turn 10 was named Singapore Sling. The Singapore Sling was changed for the 2013 Grand Prix and Turn 10 is now a flowing left-hander. Drivers have commented that without the Singapore Sling chicane, the track is much more manageable.

In January 2010, it was reported that race organisers were considering changes to the circuit for the 2011 season. No major changes were made to the layout for the 2011 race, however Singapore Tourism Board has sought submissions on opportunities to reinvigorate the layout or completely relocate it in the future.

For the 2013 season, the FIA approved of track configuration changes. The Turn 10 chicane, known as 'Singapore Sling', was removed and replaced with a single-apex left-hand bend. The corner entry speed increased by about 40 km/h (25 mph). As a safety measure to compensate for the higher speeds, an extra layer of TecPro barriers were added to the end of the Turn 10 run-off.

In 2015, the FIA approved minor changes to the layout of the Marina Bay Street Circuit ahead of the 2015 Singapore Grand Prix. The modifications run from Turn 11 to Turn 13; drivers would still turn right at Turn 11 but it will now kink left slightly on entry, with the track shifting to the left-hand side of Fullerton Road. This would change the profile of Turn 12, as drivers would now use the other side of the Anderson Bridge, while the hairpin at Turn 13 has been widened by a metre in order to increase overtaking opportunities.

Other changes were made before the 2018 Singapore Grand Prix, the track was reprofiled at turns 16 and 17, taking it from a length of 5.065 to 5.063 km (3.147 to 3.146 mi).

The circuit was expected to receive another re-profile from the 2022 Singapore Grand Prix. In August 2020, Singapore Prime Minister Lee Hsien Loong announced plans to redevelop the Marina Bay Floating Platform into a community space centred on the city-state's policy of National Service. The floating platform has housed the Turn 16–19 series of corners since the circuit's inception in 2008 and is expected to make way for the construction of NS Square in 2022. This re-profiling was not made in 2022, but it would be made before the 2023 Singapore Grand Prix, as the official ticket sale page showed the new circuit layout map. This change would be made temporarily for the 2023 season and would decrease the circuit length to 4.928 km (3.062 mi). It would be expected that the temporary layout change would drop F1 lap times by about 20 seconds.

In June 2022 started the works to upgrade most of the circuit's asphalt, in view to ease the porpoising effect on the 2022 cars.

For the purpose of the night race, approximately 1600 custom-made floodlights are spread around the 5.067 km (3.148 mi) Marina Bay circuit. The lights, four times brighter than at a regular sports stadium, are specially designed to minimize glare and surface reflection, and to meet F1's TV broadcasting standards.

== A lap in a Formula One car ==
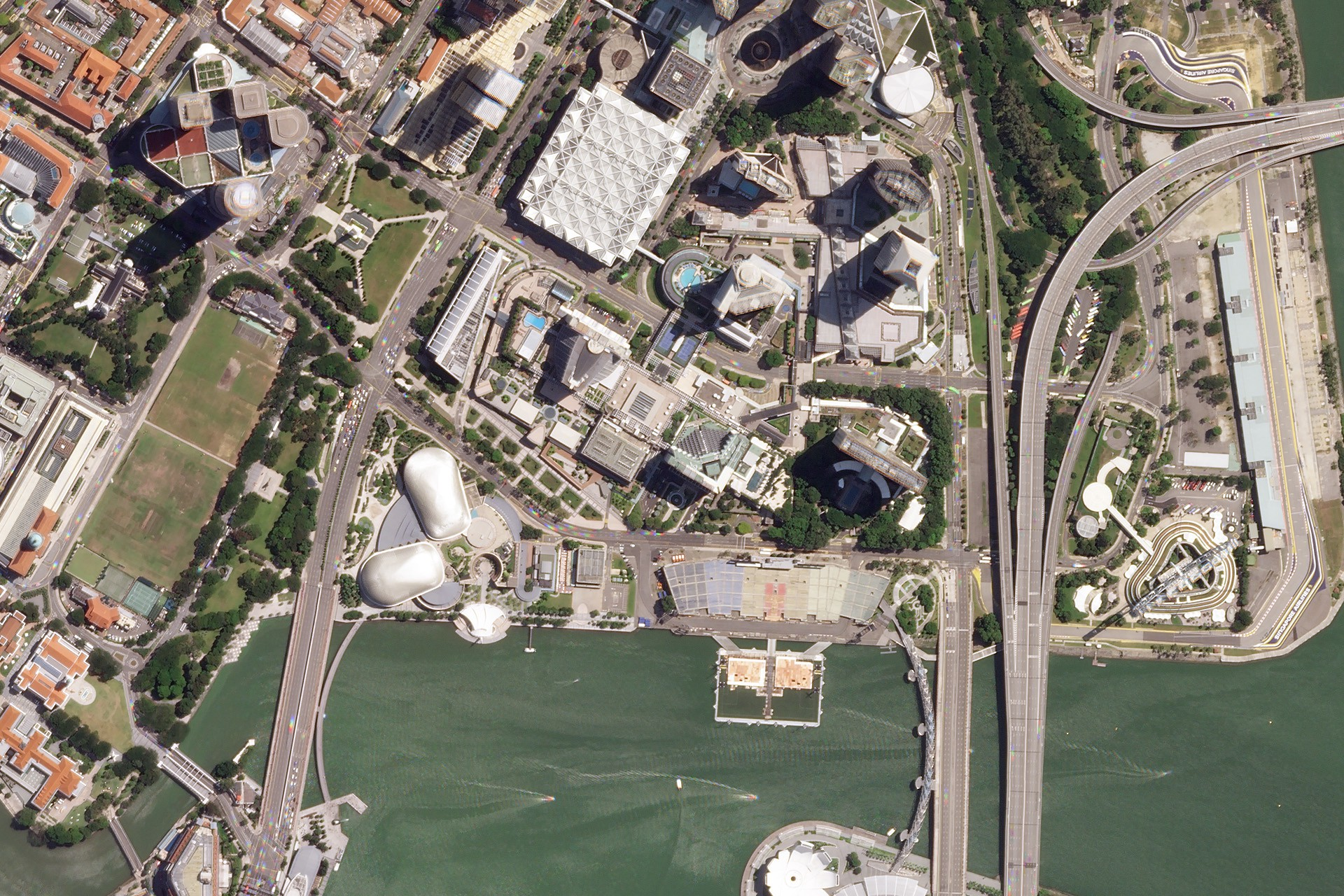
Satellite view of the course in 2018, as it appears while the roads are open to the public

Marina Bay Street Circuit starts with a specially made pit straight with the first DRS zone. The pit straight approaching just below the Benjamin Sheares Bridge at a speed of 308 km/h (191 mph) before braking into left-hand turn one to 146 km/h (91 mph). The opening sequence of turns 1, 2, and 3 are shaped like an 'S', a curve to the right for turn 2, while turn 3 is to the left at just 90 km/h (56 mph). Now, the car is on Republic Boulevard (along turn 4) speeding up to 260 km/h (160 mph), then heading to right-hand turn 5, braking to 145 km/h (90 mph). On Raffles Boulevard (where the second DRS zone is located), flat-out for turn 6, to the fastest part of the circuit at speeds of up to 320 km/h (200 mph). Cars enter the apex at turn 7 under heavy braking, slowing from 320 to 127 km/h (199 to 79 mph).

Turn the car slightly to the right at the start of Nicoll Highway, picking up the throttle to 220 km/h (140 mph), braking to the right for turn 8 to 81 km/h (50 mph), onto Stamford Road at 191 km/h (119 mph), before braking to 140 km/h (87 mph) entering turn 9. The braking leads to the St. Andrews Road (in front of the Padang), reaching speeds of 276 km/h (171 mph). Turn 10 is a left-hand turn at 150 km/h (93 mph). Turns 11, 12, and 13 were reprofiled before the 2015 Singapore Grand Prix. Drivers still turn right at turn 11, but it will now kink left slightly on entry, with the track shifting to the left-hand side of Fullerton Road. This will change the profile of turn 12, as drivers will now use the other side of the Anderson Bridge at 190 km/h (120 mph), while the hairpin at turn 13 (in front of Fullerton Hotel) has been widened by a metre in order to increase overtaking opportunities with braking to 67 km/h (42 mph).

The car is now at Esplanade Bridge (where the third DRS zone is located) crossing the Singapore river, building up speed to 290 km/h (180 mph). Turn 14 almost meets turn eight, diverting to the right at 90 km/h (56 mph) onto the Raffles Avenue (in front of Esplanade). Following a reprofiling before the 2023 Singapore Grand Prix, a long straight on Raffles Avenue (where the fourth DRS zone is located) replaces turns 16–19, bypassing the technical Float section. Previously the turn 20, turn 16 is now a massive braking point, turning hard right before slinging back left for turn 17. How fast the cars approach turn 18 is determined by the exit of turn 17, therefore most of the drivers exit turn 17 very close to the wall to gain a speed advantage. Running down towards turn 18 passes the 165 m (541 ft) tall Singapore Flyer, where turns 18 and 19 are taken flat-out at about 180 km/h (110 mph) before picking up the throttle again towards the pit straight across the finish line.

== Layout history ==
Marina Bay Street Circuit layout history
Original Circuit (2008–2012)

Revised Circuit with the Singapore Sling Chicane at Turn 10 Removed (2013–2014)

Revised Circuit with Re-profiled Turns 11–13 (2015–2017)

Revised Circuit with Re-profiled Turns 16–17 (2018–2022)

Revised Circuit with New Straight between Turns 15–16 (2023–2024)

Grand Prix Circuit (2025–present)

== Events ==
Current

- October: Formula One Singapore Grand Prix, Porsche Carrera Cup Asia

Former

- Aston Martin Asia Cup (2008–2009)
- F1 Academy (2024–2025)
- Ferrari Challenge Asia-Pacific (2017–2019)
- GP2 Series (2012–2013)
- JK Racing Asia Series (2008–2011)
- TCR International Series (2015–2016)
- Thailand Super Series (2022–2023)
- W Series (2022)

== Lap records ==
Official lap records are set in a race, although qualifying laps are typically faster. The fastest qualifying lap was 1:29.158, set by George Russell in the 2025 Singapore Grand Prix. As of October 2026, the fastest official race lap records at the Marina Bay Street Circuit are listed as:

Category	Time	Driver	Vehicle	Event
Grand Prix Circuit (2025–present): 4.927 km (3.061 mi)
Formula One	1:33.808	Lewis Hamilton	Ferrari SF-25	2025 Singapore Grand Prix
Porsche Carrera Cup	2:01.841	Alessandro Ghiretti	Porsche 911 (992 II) Cup	2026 Singapore Porsche Carrera Cup Asia round
Formula 4	2:03.587	Doriane Pin	Tatuus F4-T421	2025 Singapore F1 Academy round
Revised Circuit with New Straight between Turns 15–16 (2023–2024): 4.940 km (3.070 mi)
Formula One	1:34.486	Daniel Ricciardo	RB VCARB 01	2024 Singapore Grand Prix
GT3	2:02.530	Tanart Sathienthirakul	Audi R8 LMS GT3 Evo II	2023 Singapore Thailand Super Series round
Formula 4	2:04.454	Doriane Pin	Tatuus F4-T421	2024 Singapore F1 Academy round
Porsche Carrera Cup	2:05.061	Florian Latorre	Porsche 911 (992 I) GT3 Cup	2023 Singapore Porsche Carrera Cup Asia round
Revised Circuit with Reprofiled Turns 16–17 (2018–2022): 5.063 km (3.146 mi)
Formula One	1:41.905	Kevin Magnussen	Haas VF-18	2018 Singapore Grand Prix
Formula Regional	2:13.986	Alice Powell	Tatuus FT-60	2022 Singapore W Series round
GT3	2:16.137	Kantasak Kusiri	Mercedes-AMG GT3 Evo	2022 Singapore Thailand Super Series round
Porsche Carrera Cup	2:17.760	Will Bamber	Porsche 911 (991 II) GT3 Cup	2019 Singapore Porsche Carrera Cup Asia round
Revised Circuit with Reprofiled Turns 11–13 (2015–2017): 5.065 km (3.147 mi)
Formula One	1:45.008	Lewis Hamilton	Mercedes AMG F1 W08 EQ Power+	2017 Singapore Grand Prix
Porsche Carrera Cup	2:19.235	Ho-Pin Tung	Porsche 911 (991 I) GT3 Cup	2015 Singapore Porsche Carrera Cup Asia round
TCR Touring Car	2:25.954	Jean-Karl Vernay	Volkswagen Golf GTI TCR	2016 Singapore TCR International Series round
Revised Circuit with the Singapore Sling Chicane at Turn 10 Removed (2013–2014): 5.061 km (3.145 mi)
Formula One	1:48.574	Sebastian Vettel	Red Bull RB9	2013 Singapore Grand Prix
GP2	1:57.368	Jolyon Palmer	Dallara GP2/11	2013 Singapore GP2 round
Porsche Carrera Cup	2:20.146	Earl Bamber	Porsche 911 (991 I) GT3 Cup	2014 Singapore Porsche Carrera Cup Asia round
Original Circuit (2008–2012): 5.073 km (3.152 mi)
Formula One	1:45.599	Kimi Räikkönen	Ferrari F2008	2008 Singapore Grand Prix
GP2	2:03.184	Stefano Coletti	Dallara GP2/11	2012 Singapore GP2 round
Formula BMW	2:11.139	Ross Jamison	Mygale FB02	2008 Singapore Formula BMW Pacific round
Porsche Carrera Cup	2:20.975	Christian Menzel	Porsche 911 (997 II) GT3 Cup	2011 Singapore Porsche Carrera Cup Asia round

== Gallery ==
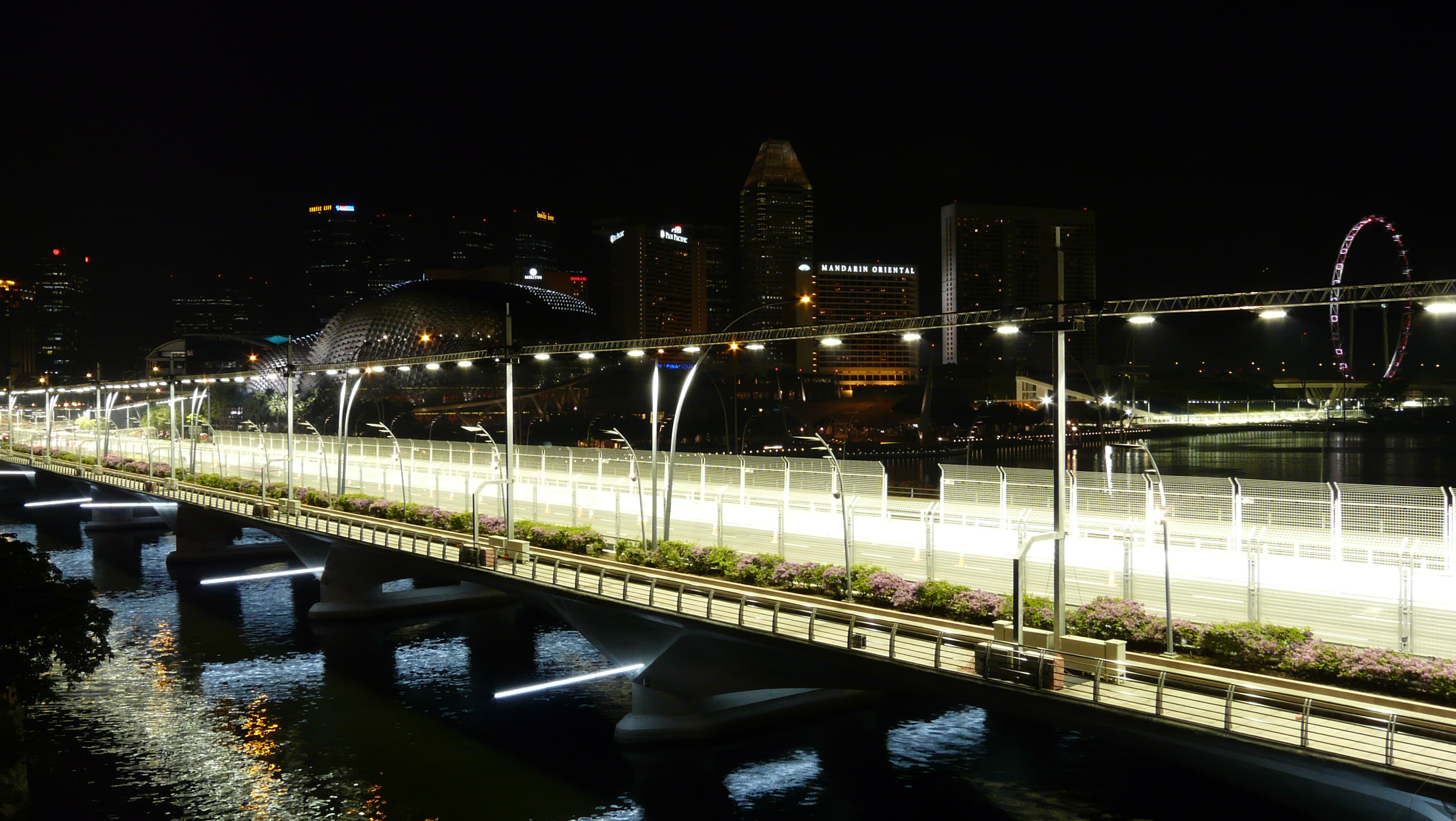
Esplanade stretch of the circuit, one week before the 2008 race

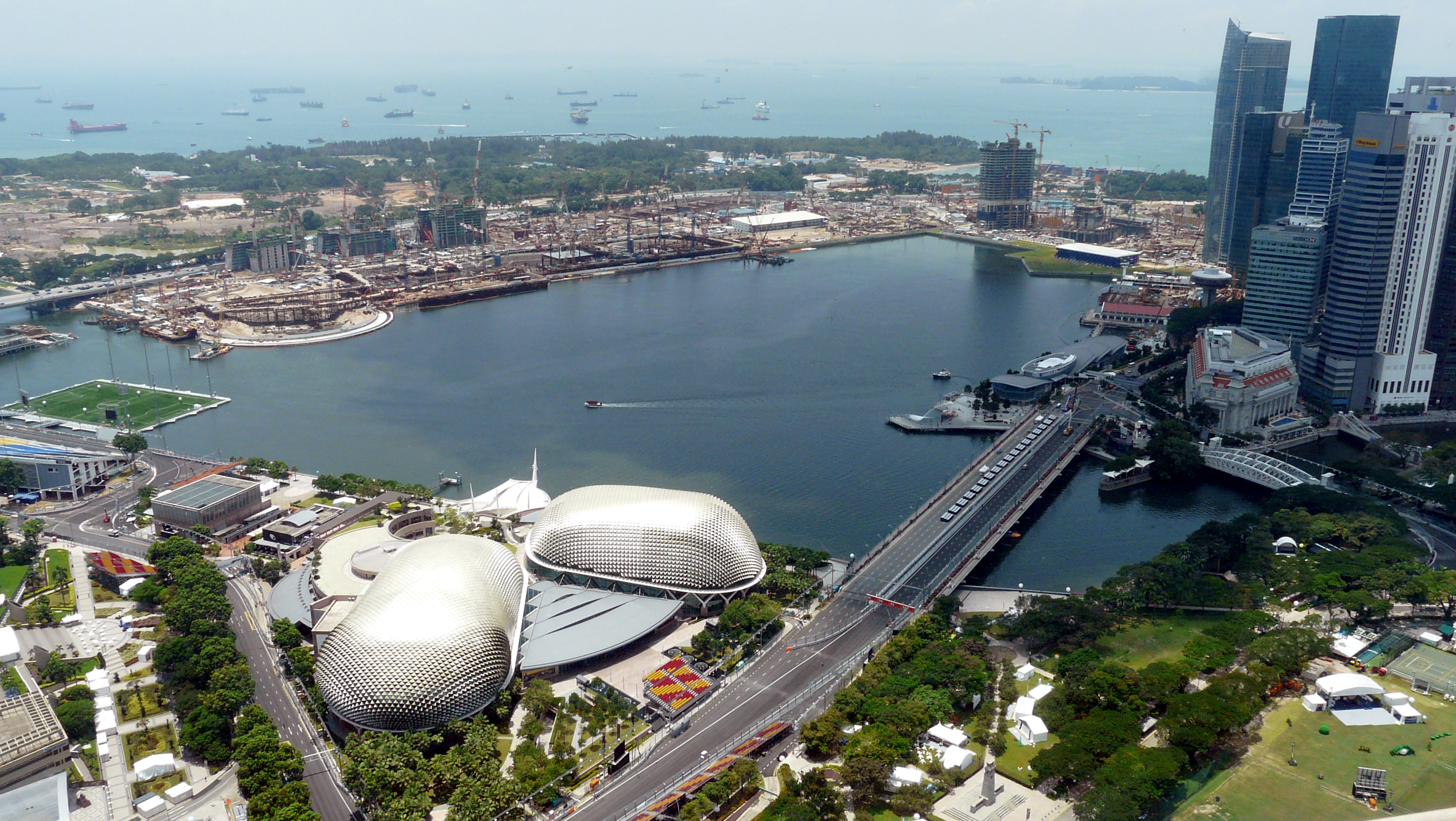
Bird's eye view of the circuit, two days before the 2008 race

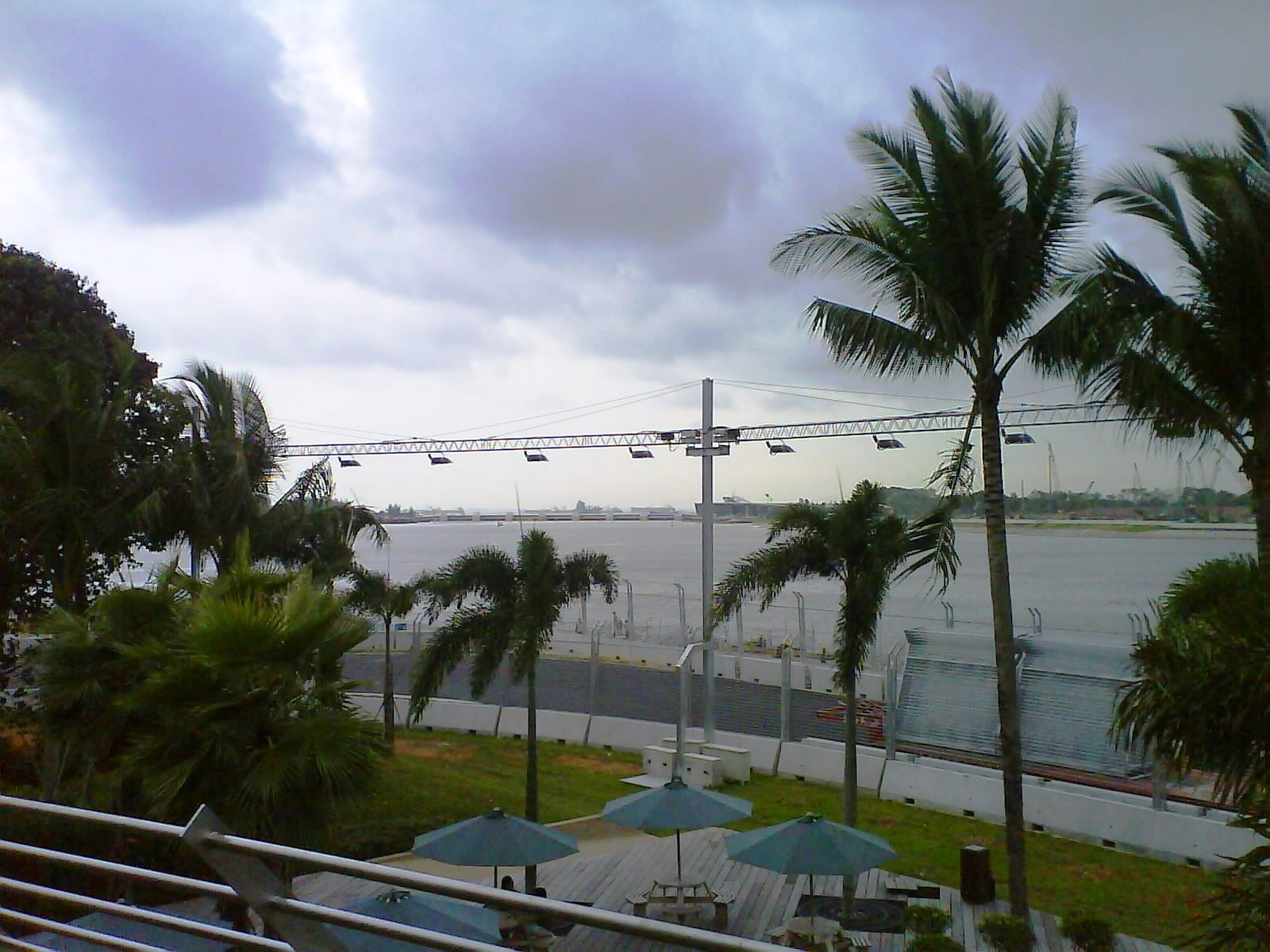
Turn 22 in 2008

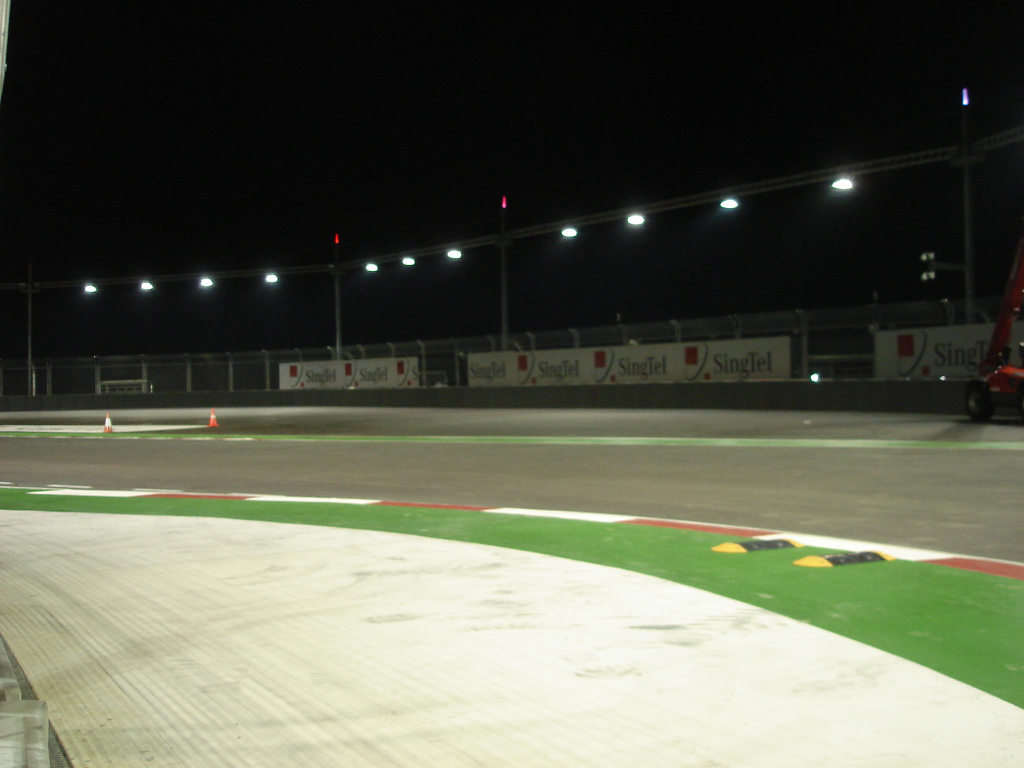
The penultimate turn in 2008

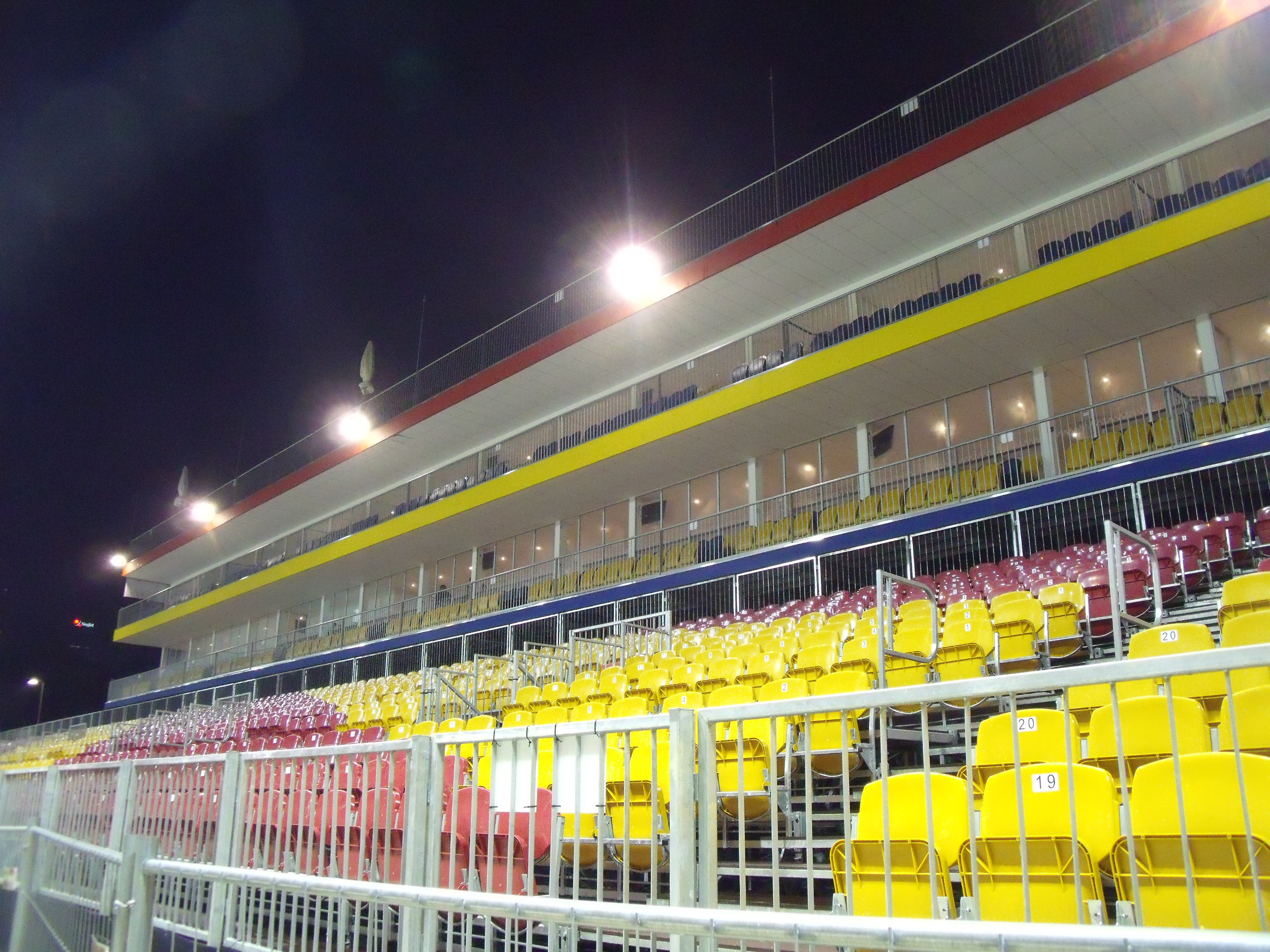
The Stamford Grandstand between Turns 7 and 8 in 2009

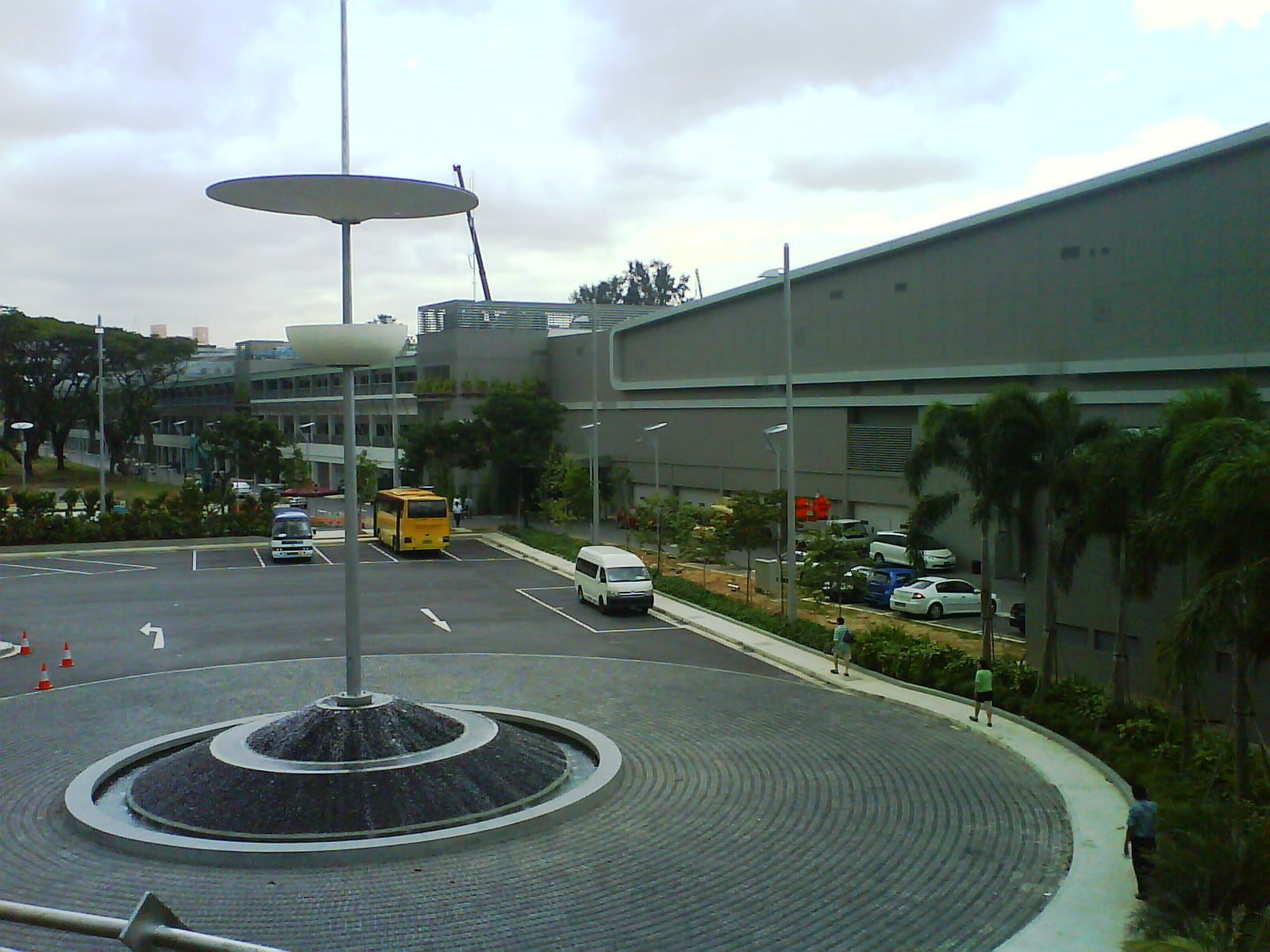
The Audience Stand in 2008
